= 2020 AFL Women's All-Australian team =

- Sponsored by: Toyota
- Date: 27 April 2020
- Country: Australia

The 2020 AFL Women's All-Australian team represents the best-performed players of the 2020 AFL Women's season. It was announced on 27 April 2020 as a complete women's Australian rules football team of 21 players. The team is honorary and does not play any games.

== Selection panel ==
The selection panel for the 2020 AFL Women's All-Australian team consisted of chairwoman Nicole Livingstone, Steve Hocking, Josh Vanderloo, Kelli Underwood, Sarah Black, Tim Harrington, Shelley Ware and Sharelle McMahon.

== Initial squad ==
The initial 40-woman All-Australian squad was announced on 3 April. Collingwood had the most players selected in the initial squad with five, and every team had at least one representative. Eleven players from the 2019 team were among those selected.

Club	Total	Player(s)
Adelaide	3	Sarah Allan, Anne Hatchard, Ebony Marinoff
Brisbane	4	Emily Bates, Sophie Conway, Kate Lutkins, Jesse Wardlaw
Carlton	4	Georgia Gee, Kerryn Harrington, Tayla Harris, Maddy Prespakis
Collingwood	5	Brittany Bonnici, Brianna Davey, Jaimee Lambert, Sharni Layton, Stacey Livingstone
Fremantle	4	Ebony Antonio, Kiara Bowers, Sabreena Duffy, Gemma Houghton
Geelong	1	Olivia Purcell
Gold Coast	3	Kalinda Howarth, Jade Pregelj, Jamie Stanton
Greater Western Sydney	2	Elle Bennetts, Alyce Parker
Melbourne	4	Libby Birch, Kate Hore, Karen Paxman, Daisy Pearce
North Melbourne	4	Jenna Bruton, Jasmine Garner, Emma Kearney, Ash Riddell
Richmond	1	Monique Conti
St Kilda	2	Caitlin Greiser, Georgia Patrikios
West Coast	1	Dana Hooker
Western Bulldogs	2	Ellie Blackburn, Isabel Huntington

== Final team ==
The final team was announced on 27 April. Finalists Carlton, Melbourne and North Melbourne had the most selections with three, and every team except Richmond and West Coast had at least one representative. Eleven players achieved selection for the first time, while eight players from the 2019 team were selected, two of whom – Melbourne vice-captain Karen Paxman and North Melbourne captain Emma Kearney – achieved selection for the fourth consecutive year. Paxman was announced as the All-Australian captain and Kearney was announced as the vice-captain.

2020 AFL Women's All-Australian team
B:	Sarah Allan (Adelaide)	Kate Lutkins (Brisbane)	
HB:	Kerryn Harrington (Carlton)	Libby Birch (Melbourne)	Isabel Huntington (Western Bulldogs)
C:	Emma Kearney (North Melbourne) (vice-captain)	Kiara Bowers (Fremantle)	Jaimee Lambert (Collingwood)
HF:	Olivia Purcell (Geelong)	Gemma Houghton (Fremantle)	Jasmine Garner (North Melbourne)
F:	Caitlin Greiser (St Kilda)	Kate Hore (Melbourne)	
Foll:	Sharni Layton (Collingwood)	Karen Paxman (Melbourne) (captain)	Maddy Prespakis (Carlton)
Int:	Kalinda Howarth (Gold Coast)	Alyce Parker (Greater Western Sydney)	Tayla Harris (Carlton)
Int:	Ash Riddell (North Melbourne)	Anne Hatchard (Adelaide)	
Coach:			

Note: the position of coach in the AFL Women's All-Australian team is traditionally awarded to the coach of the premiership-winning team; as no premiership was awarded in 2020, the coach position was not awarded.
