= Hayley Miller =

Australian rules footballer (born 1996)

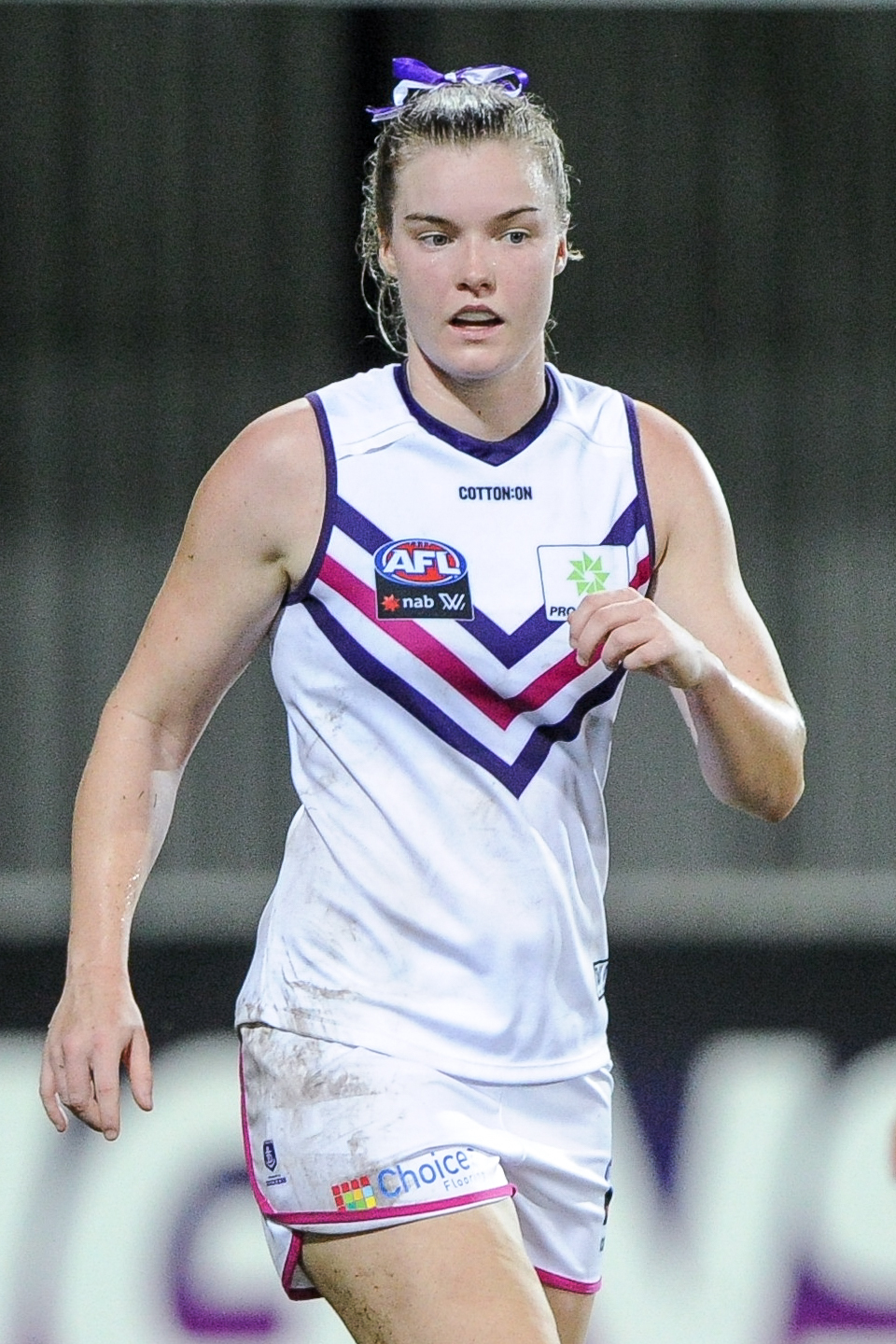
- Miller during a pre-season practice match for Fremantle in 2018

Personal information
- Full name: Hayley Miller
- Born: 3 February 1996 (age 30); Perth, Western Australia
- Original team: Coastal Titans (WAWFL)
- Draft: No. 4, 2016 national draft
- Debut: Round 1, 2017, Fremantle vs. Western Bulldogs, at Whitten Oval
- Height: 171 cm (5 ft 7 in)
- Position: Midfielder / forward

Club information
- Current club: Fremantle
- Number: 19

Playing career^{1}
Years	Club	Games (Goals)
2017–	Fremantle	104 (48)

Representative team honours
Years	Team	Games (Goals)
2017	Allies	1 (0)
- ^{1} Playing statistics correct to the end of the 2026 season.

Career highlights
- Fremantle captain: 2022 (S6)–2023; Fremantle games record holder; AFL Women's All-Australian team: S6; Fremantle fairest and best: S6; 3× Fremantle leading goalkicker: S6, 2025 & 2026; Derby Medal: S7

Hayley Miller (born 3 February 1996) is an Australian rules footballer playing for the Fremantle Football Club in the AFL Women's competition. Miller was selected in the 2022 AFL Women's season 6 All-Australian team and won the Fremantle fairest and best in season 6, and is a three time Fremantle leading goalkicker. She served as Fremantle captain for three seasons from season 6 to 2023, is Fremantle's games record holder with 104 games and Fremantle AFLW all-time leading goal scorer with 48 goals.

== Early career ==
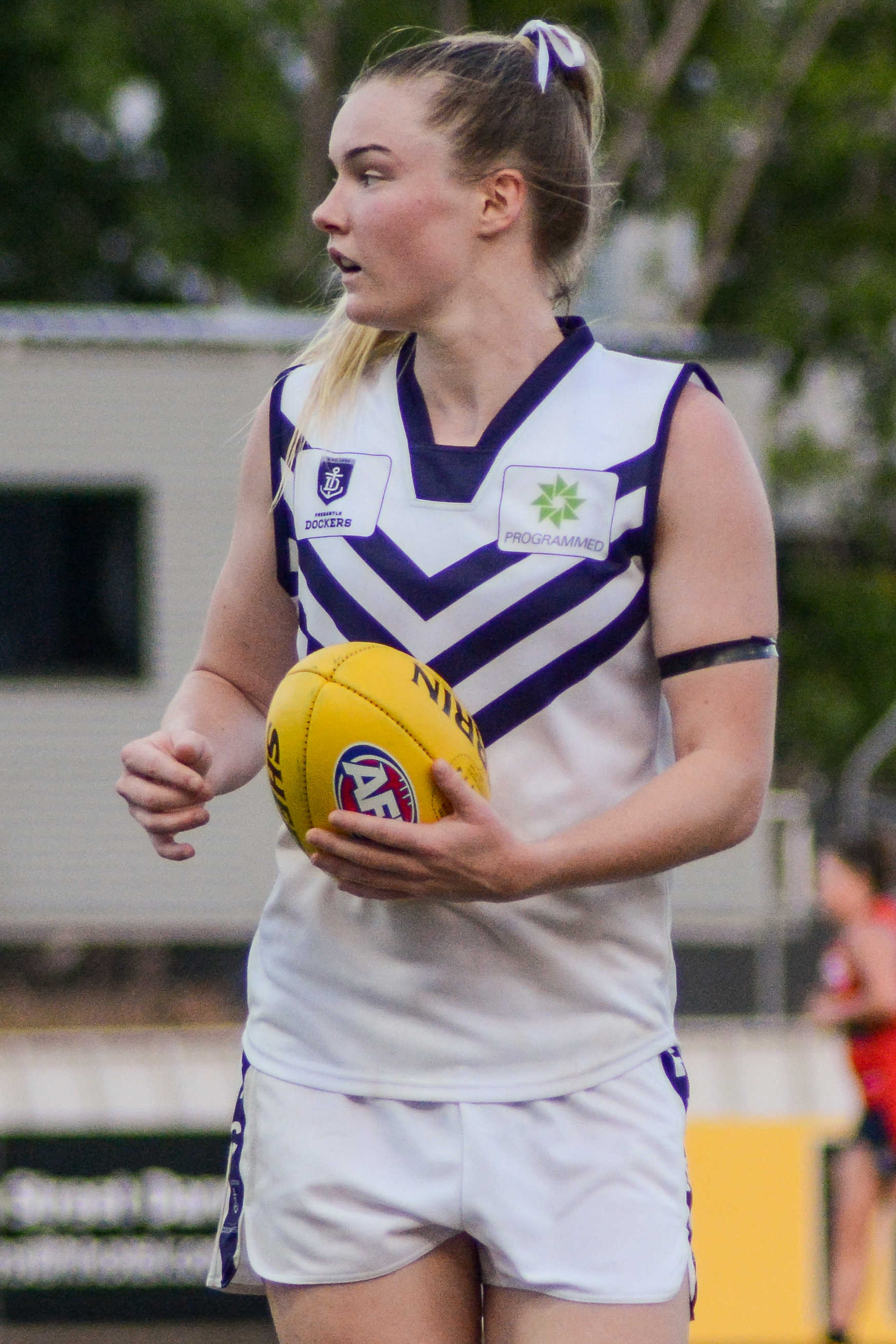
Miller during a pre-season practice match for Fremantle in 2017

Miller was born in Perth, Western Australia. She started her football career in 2016, playing for the West Coast Eagles in the West Australian Women's Football League. She made the line-up for the inaugural women's Western Derby on April 9th 2016, against her future club the Fremantle Dockers. Despite suffering a broken leg in the opening minutes of the match, Miller would play out the entirety of the game and finished with two goals in the 65 point win.

Miller represented the Allies during their State of Origin match against Victoria at Etihad Stadium in 2017, replacing the injured Sam Virgo. She also captained the Coastal Titans for their 2017 season. Miller won the Dhara Kerr Award in 2018, playing for the Subiaco Football Club, as the player adjudged Best and fairest throughout the year. She was the last player to win the award in the WAWFL competition, before it was superseded by the WAFL Women's the following year. Miller continued playing for Subiaco the following season in the newly established WAFL Women's, and finished the year having won her second Dhara Kerr award, tying with Danika Pisconeri.

== AFL Women's career ==
Miller was drafted by Fremantle with their first selection and fourth overall in the 2016 AFL Women's draft. She made her debut in the thirty-two point loss to the Western Bulldogs at VU Whitten Oval in the opening round of the 2017 season. She played every match in her debut season to finish with seven matches.

Miller was named as the new Fremantle captain in December 2021, taking over from inaugural captain Kara Antonio. A career-best season saw Miller earn selection in the 2022 AFL Women's season 6 All-Australian team as a half forward, and named vice-captain. Hayley was the first AFLW player from Western Australia to play 50 games in the league, a feat she achieved in 2022 during a preliminary final against the Adelaide Crows at the Adelaide Oval.

Ahead of the 2024 season, Miller was replaced as captain by Angelique Stannett and named as one of three vice-captains, alongside Laura Pugh and Aine Tighe. Miller was named Fremantle's best player in its win over Port Adelaide in week 3.

Miller finished the 2025 AFL Women's season as Fremantle's leading goalkicker, with 11 goals from 12 games.

== Statistics ==
Updated to the end of the 2025 season.

Legend
G	Goals	K	Kicks	D	Disposals	T	Tackles
B	Behinds	H	Handballs	M	Marks

Season	Team	No.	Games	Totals							Averages (per game)							Votes
Season	Team	No.	Games	G	B	K	H	D	M	T	G	B	K	H	D	M	T	Votes
2017	Fremantle	19	7	0	1	48	10	58	15	15	0.0	0.1	6.9	1.4	8.3	2.1	2.1	0
2018	Fremantle	19	7	1	1	66	24	90	14	26	0.1	0.1	9.4	3.4	12.9	2.0	3.7	4
2019	Fremantle	19	7	1	3	58	22	80	5	25	0.1	0.4	8.3	3.1	11.4	0.7	3.6	0
2020	Fremantle	19	7	1	2	71	26	97	20	29	0.1	0.3	10.1	3.7	13.9	2.9	4.1	2
2021	Fremantle	19	10	1	5	88	46	134	18	55	0.1	0.5	8.8	4.6	13.4	1.8	5.5	4
2022 (S6)	Fremantle	19	12	10	9	174	50	224	39	73	0.8	0.8	14.5	4.2	18.7	3.3	6.1	15
2022 (S7)	Fremantle	19	10	3	4	130	43	173	18	45	0.3	0.4	13.0	4.3	17.3	1.8	4.5	5
2023	Fremantle	19	10	3	5	101	33	134	16	43	0.3	0.5	10.1	3.3	13.4	1.6	4.3	0
2024	Fremantle	19	10	4	6	113	34	147	23	43	0.4	0.6	11.3	3.4	14.7	2.3	4.3	7
2025	Fremantle	19	12	11	11	119	48	167	40	34	0.9	0.9	9.9	4.0	13.9	3.3	2.8	0
Career			92	35	47	968	336	1304	208	388	0.4	0.5	10.5	3.7	14.2	2.3	4.2	37

== Honours and achievements ==
- Fremantle captain: 2022 (S6)–2023
- Fremantle games record holder
- AFL Women's All-Australian team: S6
- Fremantle fairest and best: S6
- 3× Fremantle leading goalkicker: S6 2022, 2025 & 2026
- Derby Medal: S7
- Allies representative honours in AFL Women's State of Origin: 2017
