= 2021 AFL Women's best and fairest =

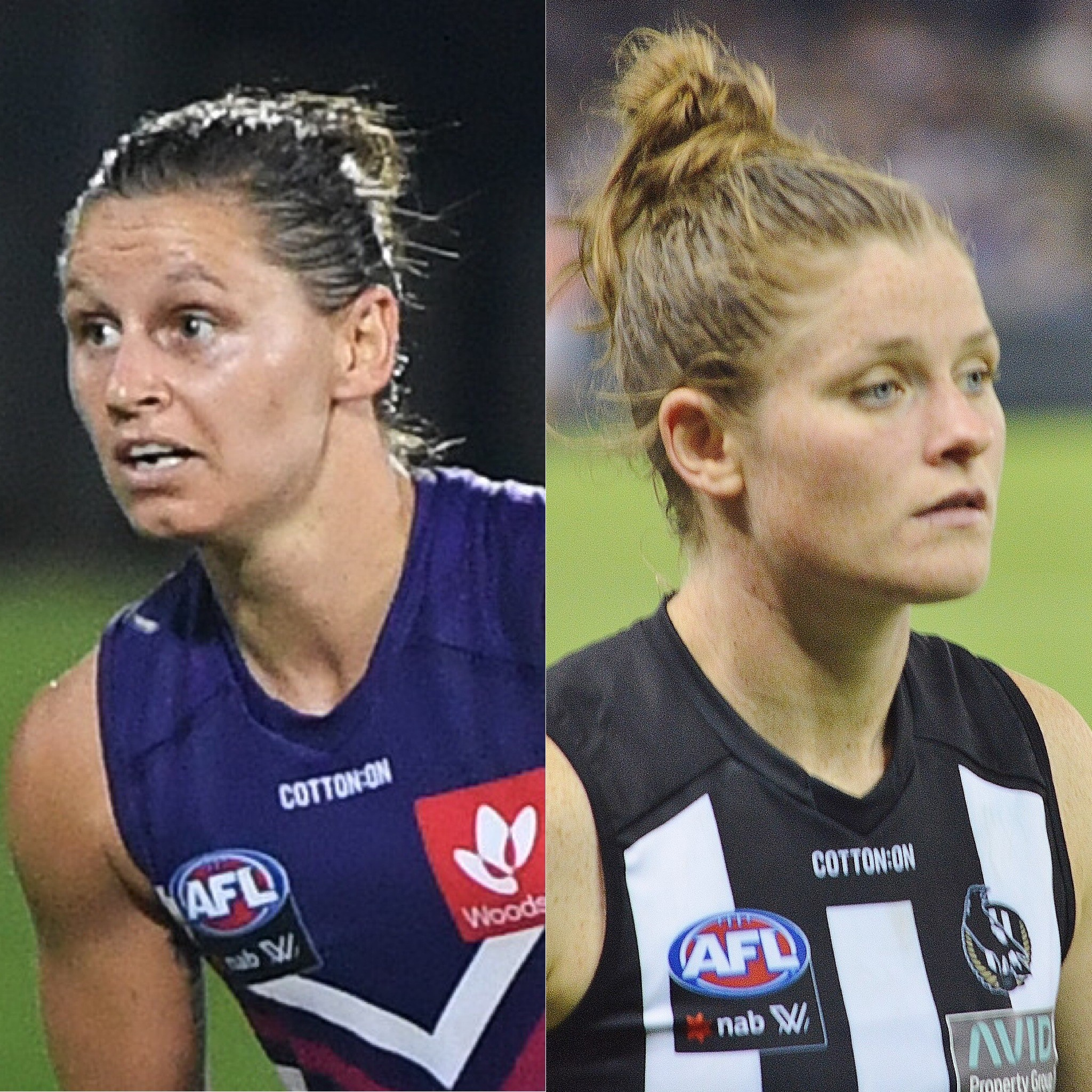
- Kiara Bowers and Brianna Davey, 2021 winners
- Date: 20 April 2021
- Venue: 2021 W Awards venues: Adelaide Oval; Crown Melbourne; The Gabba; Perth Stadium; Sydney Cricket Ground
- Hosted by: Sarah Jones
- Winners: Kiara Bowers (Fremantle); Brianna Davey (Collingwood)

Television/radio coverage
- Network: Fox Footy

The 2021 AFL Women's best and fairest award was presented to the players adjudged the best and fairest players during the 2021 AFL Women's season. Kiara Bowers of the Fremantle Football Club and Brianna Davey of the Collingwood Football Club jointly won the award with 15 votes each.

== Leading votegetters ==
| Placing | Player | Votes |
|---|---|---|
| =1st | Kiara Bowers (Fremantle) | 15 |
| =1st | Brianna Davey (Collingwood) | 15 |
| =3rd | Ellie Blackburn (Western Bulldogs) | 14 |
| =3rd | Alyce Parker (Greater Western Sydney) | 14 |
| =5th | Anne Hatchard (Adelaide) | 13 |
| =5th | Karen Paxman (Melbourne) | 13 |
| =7th | Brittany Bonnici (Collingwood) | 12 |
| =7th | Monique Conti (Richmond) | 12 |
| 9th | Ebony Marinoff (Adelaide) | 11 |
| =10th | Maddy Prespakis (Carlton)* | 10 |
| =10th | Ashleigh Riddell (North Melbourne) | 10 |

* Prespakis was ineligible to win the award after being suspended by the AFL Tribunal during the home-and-away season.

== Voting procedure ==
The three field umpires (the umpires who control the flow of the game, as opposed to goal or boundary umpires) confer after each match and award three votes, two votes and one vote to the players they regard as the best, second-best and third-best in the match, respectively. The votes are kept secret until the awards night, and are read and tallied on the evening.
