= Dana Hooker =

Australian rules footballer

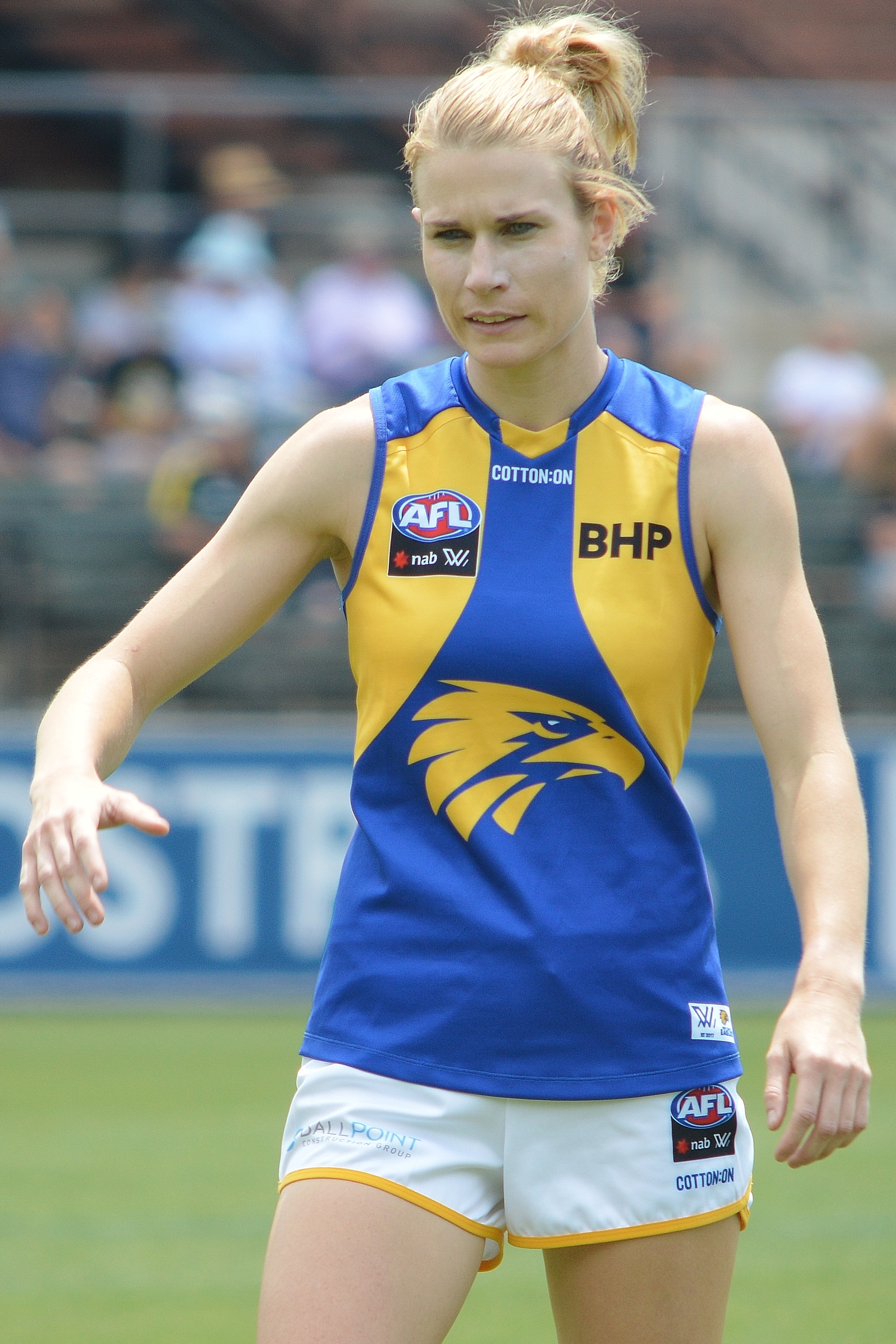
- Hooker during a pre-season practice match for West Coast in 2020

Personal information
- Full name: Dana Hooker
- Born: 23 January 1991 (age 35)
- Original team: Coastal Titans (WAWFL)
- Draft: No. 130, 2016 national draft
- Debut: Round 1, 2017, Fremantle vs. Western Bulldogs, at VU Whitten Oval
- Height: 171 cm (5 ft 7 in)
- Position: Midfielder

Playing career^{1}
Years	Club	Games (Goals)
2017–2019	Fremantle	22 (6)
2020–2025	West Coast	45 (7)
Total		67 (13)

Representative team honours^{2}
Years	Team	Games (Goals)
2017	The Allies	1 (0)
- ^{1} Playing statistics correct to the end of the 2025 season.^{2} Representative statistics correct as of 2017.

Career highlights
- 2× AFL Women's All-Australian team: 2018, 2019; Fremantle fairest and best: 2017; West Coast Club Champion: 2020

Dana Hooker (born 23 January 1991) is a former Australian rules footballer who played for the West Coast Eagles and the Fremantle Football Club in the AFL Women's (AFLW). Hooker is a dual AFL Women's All-Australian, and was the inaugural Fremantle fairest and best winner in 2017 and inaugural West Coast Club Champion in 2020.

== State league career ==
Hooker played with the Coastal Titans in the West Australian Women's Football League before missing a majority of the 2016 season after giving birth to her first child. During her state league career she made representative teams on multiple occasions including for Western Australia from 2011 to 2016, which included All-Australian selection in 2013, and playing for the Western Bulldogs and Melbourne in 2014 and 2015 respectively in the exhibition series.

== AFL Women's career ==
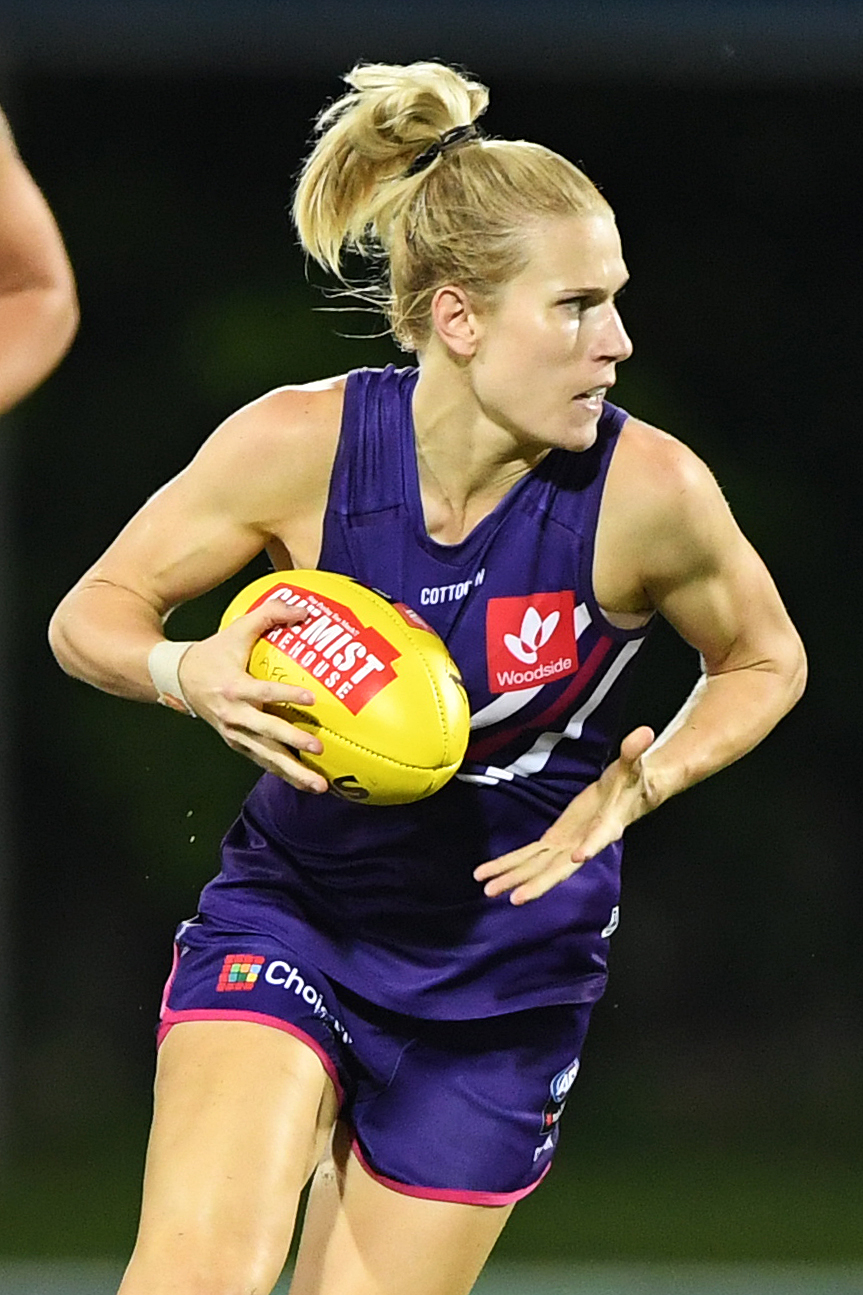
Hooker during a pre-season practice match for Fremantle in 2019

=== Fremantle (2017–2019) ===
Hooker was recruited by Fremantle with their seventeenth selection and 130th overall in the inaugural AFL Women's draft. In January 2017, she was voted into Fremantle's leadership group. She made her debut in the thirty-two point loss to the Western Bulldogs at VU Whitten Oval in the opening round of the 2017 season. Despite a disappointing season on the field for Fremantle, Hooker thrived and was named in Fremantle's best players in every match for the season and led the statistical counts at the club for disposals, kicks, marks and was second in inside-50s. Her performances during the season saw her win the inaugural Fremantle fairest and best award, and she was selected in the initial 40-woman squad for the 2017 AFL Women's All-Australian team.

Fremantle signed Hooker for the 2018 season during the trade period in May 2017.

Fremantle signed Hooker for the 2019 season during the trade and signing period in May 2018.

=== West Coast (2020–2025) ===
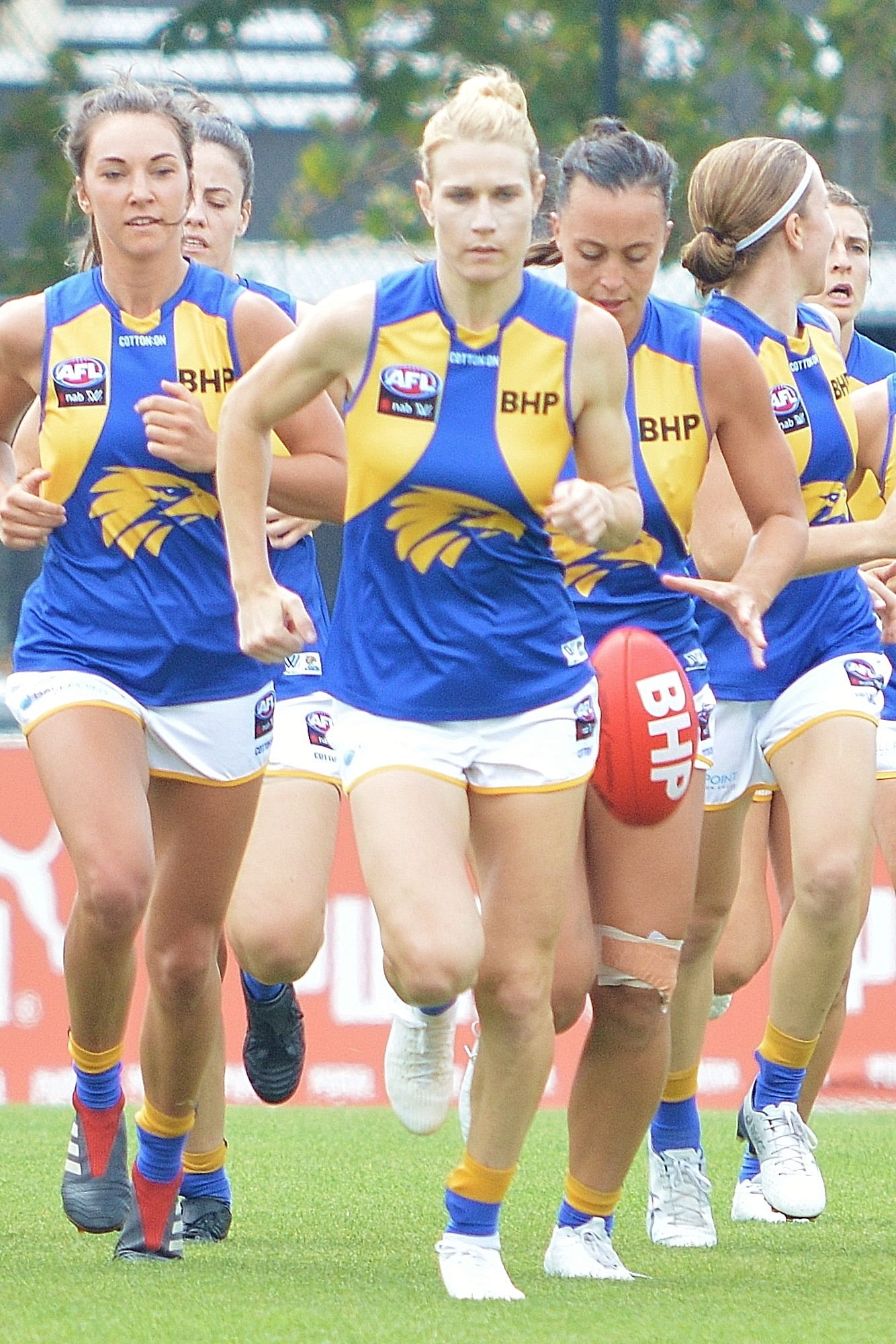
Hooker (centre) during a pre-season practice match for West Coast in 2020

In April 2019, Hooker signed with West Coast on a two-year contract, becoming the club's first big-name signing for its women's team. In December, she was named vice-captain, supporting inaugural captain Emma Swanson.

Leading into the 2020 season, womens.afl journalist Sarah Black named Hooker at no. 4 on her list of the top 30 players in the AFLW. She made her West Coast debut in the club's inaugural game against Collingwood at Victoria Park in round 1, kicking the team's only goal for the game and achieving selection in womens.afl's Team of the Week for that round. She was also selected in the Team of the Week in round 6, and was selected in the initial 40-woman squad for the 2020 AFL Women's All-Australian team. In August, Hooker was named the inaugural West Coast Club Champion.

Leading into the 2021 season, Sarah Black named Hooker at no. 12 on her annual list of the top 30 players in the AFLW. After being one of the Eagles' best players in their round 1 loss to Adelaide, Hooker was ruled out for the rest of the season when she required surgery after a household accident where a knife fell from a kitchen bench and lacerated a tendon in her foot.

Hooker was named among West Coast's best players in its losses to Gold Coast, Adelaide and Geelong in rounds 2, 3 and 5 of the 2022 season, and was best afield in West Coast's first win of the season against St Kilda a few days later; she polled eight coaches' votes for the St Kilda match and was selected in womens.afl's Team of the Week for that round. She was West Coast's best player in its loss to Collingwood in round 6 and was among West Coast's best players in its loss to Richmond in round 7. Hooker suffered a shoulder injury in the second quarter of West Coast's loss to the Western Bulldogs in round 9.

== Statistics ==
Updated to the end of the 2025 season.

Legend
G	Goals	K	Kicks	D	Disposals	T	Tackles
B	Behinds	H	Handballs	M	Marks

Season	Team	No.	Games	Totals							Averages (per game)							Votes
Season	Team	No.	Games	G	B	K	H	D	M	T	G	B	K	H	D	M	T	Votes
2017	Fremantle	17	7	0	1	87	34	121	19	23	0.0	0.1	12.4	4.9	17.3	2.7	3.3	1
2018	Fremantle	17	7	5	1	86	37	123	11	33	0.7	0.1	12.3	5.3	17.6	1.6	4.7	9
2019	Fremantle	17	8	1	1	90	43	133	9	58	0.1	0.1	11.3	5.4	16.6	1.1	7.3	11
2020	West Coast	17	6	1	0	85	33	118	16	41	0.2	0.0	14.2	5.5	19.7	2.7	6.9	6
2021	West Coast	17	1	0	0	14	5	19	2	2	0.0	0.0	14.0	5.0	19.0	2.0	2.0	0
2022 (S6)	West Coast	17	9	2	1	99	47	146	18	30	0.2	0.1	11.0	5.2	16.2	2.0	3.3	3
2022 (S7)	West Coast	17	10	1	1	87	30	117	25	38	0.1	0.1	8.7	3.0	11.7	2.5	3.8	0
2023	West Coast	17	10	2	5	85	45	130	23	73	0.2	0.5	8.5	4.5	13.0	2.3	7.3	0
2024	West Coast	17	0	-	-	-	-	-	-	-	0.0	0.0	0.0	0.0	0.0	0.0	0.0	0
2025	West Coast	17	9	1	3	58	34	92	15	17	0.1	0.3	6.4	3.8	10.2	1.7	1.9	0
Career			67	13	13	691	308	999	138	315	0.2	0.2	10.3	4.6	14.9	2.1	4.7	30

== Honours and achievements ==
- 2× AFL Women's All-Australian team: 2018, 2019
- Fremantle fairest and best: 2017
- West Coast Club Champion: 2020
- Allies representative honours in AFL Women's State of Origin: 2017
