= Ange Stannett =

Australian rules footballer (born 1997)

Angelique Stannett
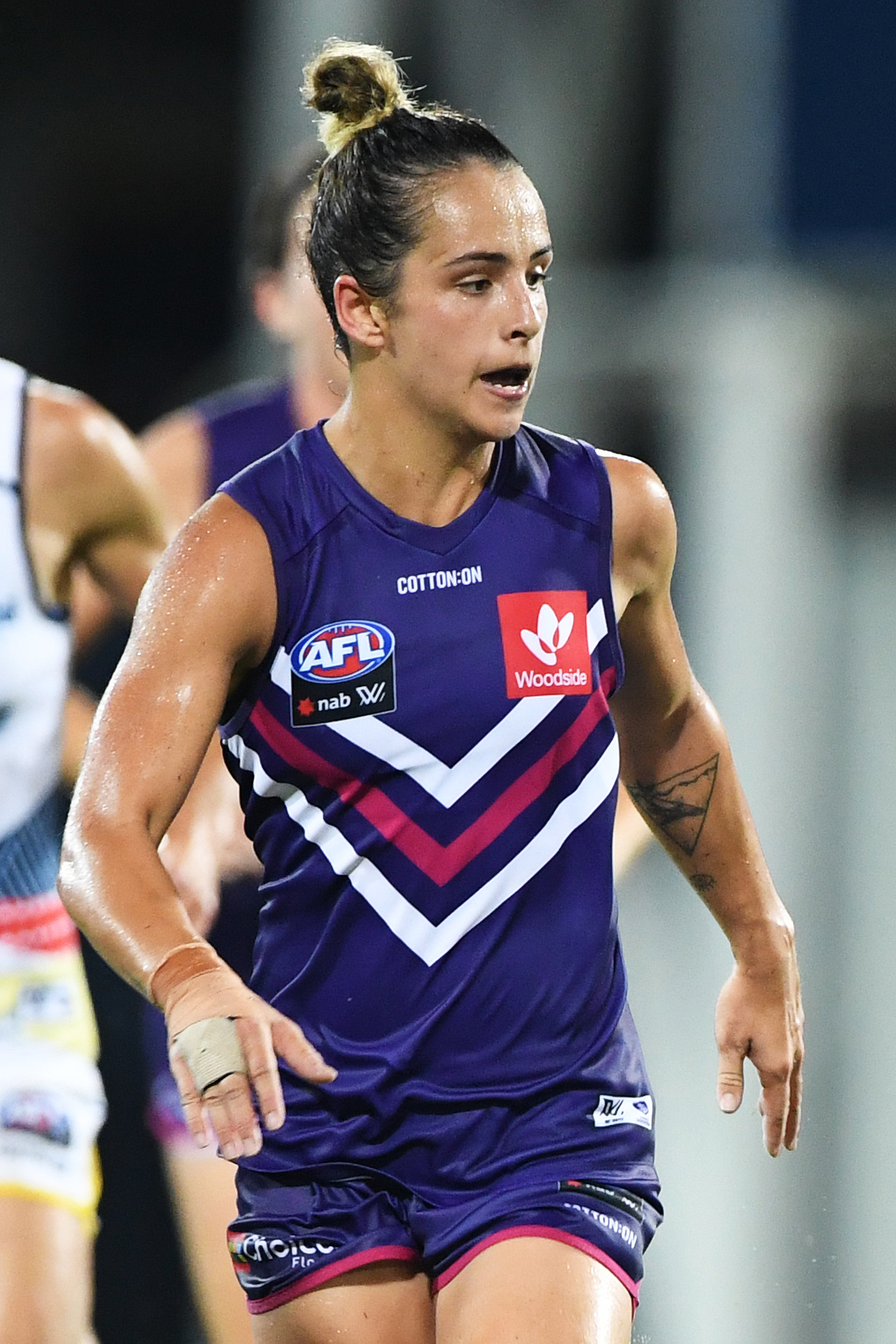
- Stannett playing for Fremantle in January 2019
- Born: 15 April 1997 (age 29); New Zealand
- Height: 1.63 m (5 ft 4 in)
Australian rules football career
Personal information
- Draft: 2018 rookie signing
- Debut: Round 1, 2019, Fremantle vs. Melbourne, at Casey Fields
- Position: forward
Club information
- Current club: Fremantle
- Number: 4
Playing career^{1}
Years	Club	Games (Goals)
2019–	Fremantle	81 (13)
- ^{1} Playing statistics correct to the end of the 2026 season.
Career highlights
- Fremantle fairest and best: 2023; Fremantle captain: 2024-present
Association football career
Senior career*
Years	Team	Apps	(Gls)
2015–2017	Perth Glory	6	(0)
- * Club domestic league appearances and goals

Angelique Stannett (born 15 April 1997) is an Australian rules footballer and the captain of the Fremantle Football Club in the AFL Women's (AFLW). She is a former soccer player for Perth Glory in the W-League.

== Early life ==
Stannett was born in New Zealand, arriving in Australia with her family at the age of three.

== Soccer career ==
Stannett took up soccer at the age of six, playing for Sutherlands Park in the southern suburbs of Perth. Stannett played six matches for Perth Glory during the 2015–16 W-League season.

== Australian rules football career ==
Stannett was drafted by Fremantle as a rookie signing. She made her debut in the four point win against Melbourne at Casey Fields in the opening round of the 2019 season.

Playing for Swan Districts in the 2019 WAFL Women's competition, Stannett won the Mandy McSherry Medal, the teams's fairest and best award, as well as the team's rookie of the year award.

Stannett finished the 2023 AFL Women's season having won Fremantle's fairest and best award. She was named Fremantle captain ahead of the 2024 AFL Women's season.

== Personal life ==
Stannett was previously in a relationship with Perth Glory captain Natasha Rigby.

== Statistics ==
Updated to the end of the 2025 season.

Legend
G	Goals	K	Kicks	D	Disposals	T	Tackles
B	Behinds	H	Handballs	M	Marks

Season	Team	No.	Games	Totals							Averages (per game)							Votes
Season	Team	No.	Games	G	B	K	H	D	M	T	G	B	K	H	D	M	T	Votes
2019	Fremantle	24	8	0	0	17	9	26	1	17	0.0	0.0	2.1	1.1	3.3	0.1	2.1	0
2020	Fremantle	24	7	0	0	39	20	59	10	18	0.0	0.0	5.6	2.9	8.4	1.4	2.6	0
2021	Fremantle	4	10	0	0	51	13	64	10	25	0.0	0.0	5.1	1.3	6.4	1.0	2.5	0
2022 (S6)	Fremantle	4	12	0	0	96	29	125	27	32	0.0	0.0	8.0	2.4	10.4	2.3	2.7	2
2022 (S7)	Fremantle	4	10	0	0	69	18	87	13	34	0.0	0.0	6.9	1.8	8.7	1.3	3.4	0
2023	Fremantle	4	10	4	5	93	51	144	21	68	0.4	0.5	9.3	5.1	14.4	2.1	6.8	3
2024	Fremantle	4	0	0	0	-	-	-	-	-	0.0	0.0	0.0	0.0	0.0	0.0	0.0	0
2025	Fremantle	4	12	7	4	71	45	116	8	41	0.6	0.3	5.9	3.8	9.7	0.7	3.4	3
Career			69	11	9	436	185	621	90	235	0.2	0.1	6.3	2.7	9.0	1.3	3.4	8
