= Ebony Antonio =

Australian rules footballer

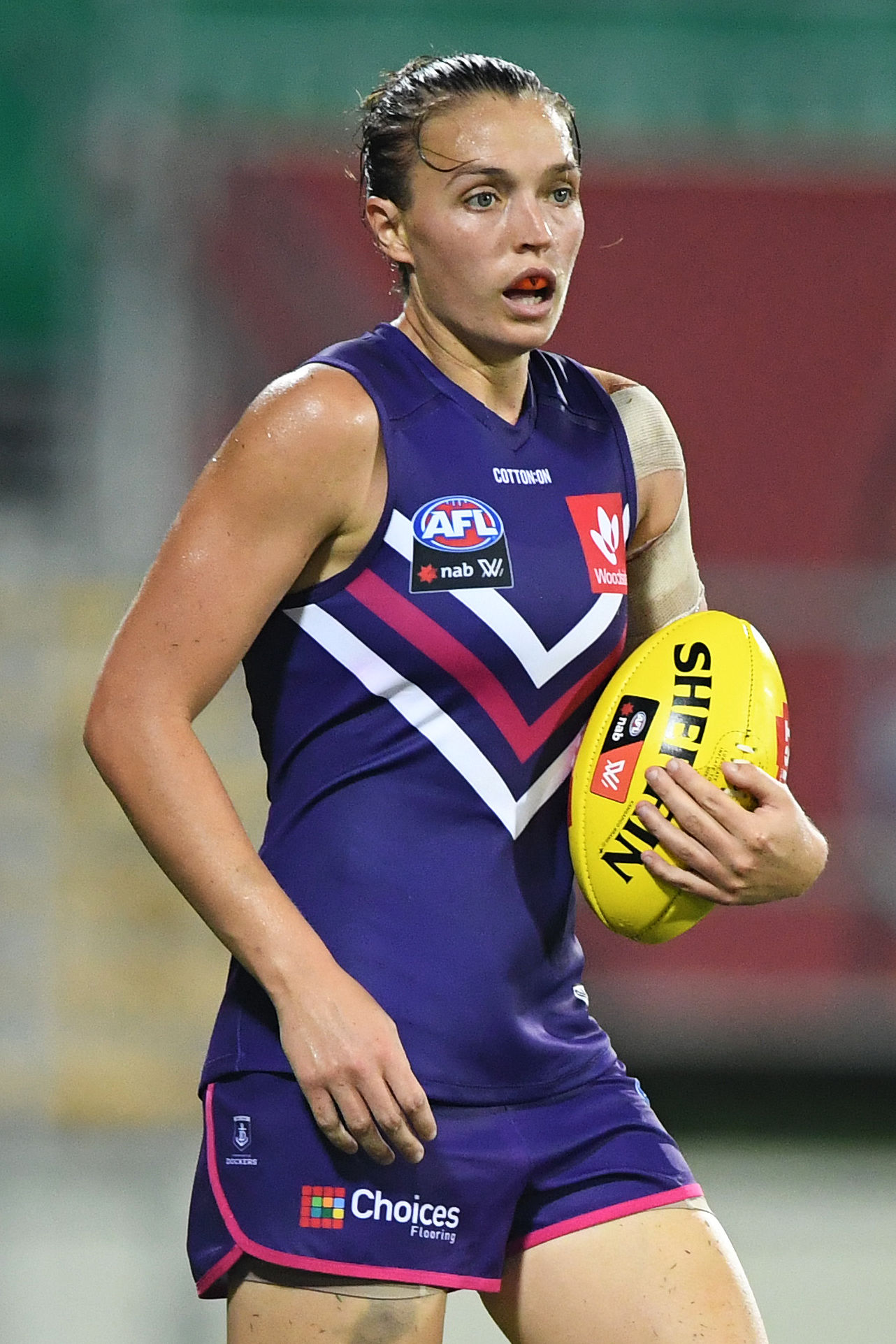
- Antonio during a pre-season practice match for Fremantle in 2019

Personal information
- Full name: Ebony-Rose Antonio
- Born: 18 December 1991 (age 34)
- Original team: Swan Districts (WAWFL)
- Draft: 2016 priority selection
- Debut: Round 1, 2017, Fremantle vs. Western Bulldogs, at VU Whitten Oval
- Height: 173 cm (5 ft 8 in)
- Position: Defender / forward

Playing career^{1}
Years	Club	Games (Goals)
2017–2025	Fremantle	70 (38)

Representative team honours^{2}
Years	Team	Games (Goals)
2017	The Allies	1 (0)
- ^{1} Playing statistics correct to the end of the 2025 season.^{2} Representative statistics correct as of 2017.

Career highlights
- AFL Women's All-Australian team: 2018; Fremantle fairest and best: 2018; Goal of the Year: 2022 (S6); Fremantle leading goalkicker: 2022 (S6); Western Derby Medal: 2022 (S6)

Ebony-Rose Antonio (born 18 December 1991) is a former Australian rules footballer who played for the Fremantle Football Club in the AFL Women's (AFLW). Antonio represented The Allies in the inaugural AFL Women's State of Origin match in 2017, and won AFL Women's All-Australian selection and the Fremantle fairest and best award in 2018. She also won the Goal of the Year and shared the Western Derby Medal with Kiara Bowers in 2022 season 6.

== Early life ==
Antonio attended Willetton Senior High School in Perth, Western Australia. She played football and basketball as a junior. Between 2009 and 2011, she played in the State Basketball League (SBL) for the Willetton Tigers. During this time, she spent two seasons with the West Coast Waves in the Women's National Basketball League (WNBL). In 2012, she moved to Bendigo in Victoria to play for the Bendigo Braves and Bendigo Spirit. She played two seasons for both teams, and she was a member of the Spirit's 2012/13 and 2013/14 WNBL championship squads. In 2014, she returned to Perth to play for the Willetton Tigers before re-joining the Waves for 2014/15 season. She continued on with the Tigers in 2015 and 2016. She won championships with Willetton in 2009, 2010, 2011 and 2016. She turned her attention to football in 2016, playing with the Swan Districts in the West Australian Women's Football League (WAWFL). Antonio was signed as a priority player by Fremantle in August 2016 ahead of the league's inaugural 2017 season.

== AFL Women's career ==
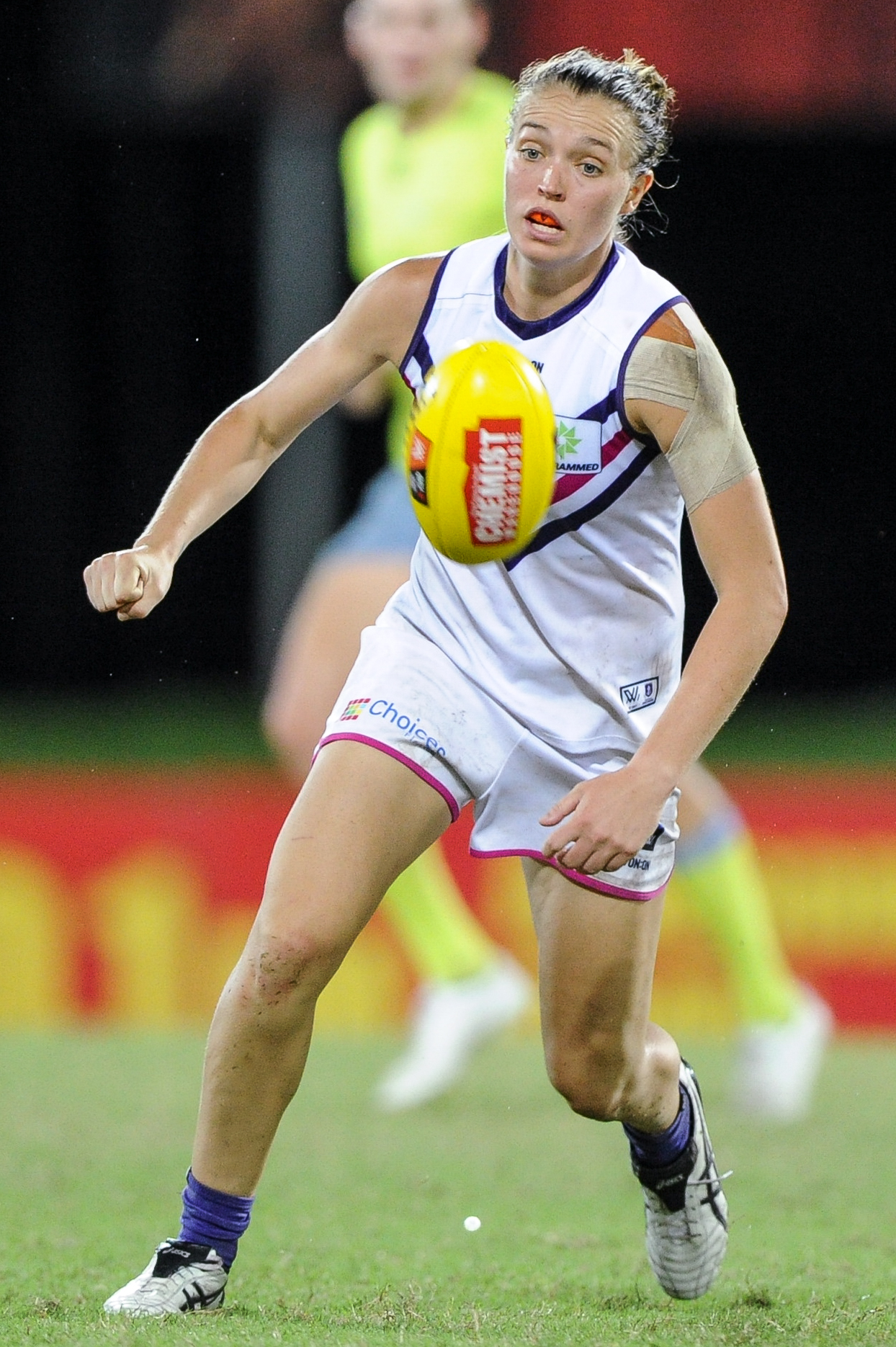
Antonio during a pre-season practice match in 2018

Antonio made her debut in round 1, 2017 in the club's inaugural match against Western Bulldogs at VU Whitten Oval. She was the first player to be suspended in the AFLW, receiving a one-week suspension for a high bump on Bulldogs defender Jess Gardner. Antonio returned to play for the Dockers' final five matches of the season. Antonio later played for The Allies in the inaugural AFL Women's State of Origin match against Victoria on 2 September, where she was named among the Allies' best players. Fremantle signed Antonio for the 2018 season during the trade and signing period in May 2017.

Antonio had a much improved season in 2018, when she was selected in the 2018 AFL Women's All-Australian team and won the Fremantle fairest and best award. She had minor surgery on her Achilles following the AFLW season, forcing her to miss most of the WAWFL season with Swan Districts. Fremantle signed Antonio for the 2019 season during the trade and signing period in May 2018.

Fremantle signed Antonio for the 2020 season during the trade and sign period in April 2019.

Leading into the 2020 season, womens.afl journalist Sarah Black named Antonio at no. 20 on her list of the top 30 players in the AFLW. She was selected in womens.afl's Team of the Week in round 6, and was selected in the initial 40-woman squad for the 2020 AFL Women's All-Australian team.

Leading into the 2021 season, Sarah Black named Antonio at no. 15 on her annual list of the top 30 players in the AFLW. She was named among Fremantle's best players in its record-breaking Western Derby win over West Coast in round 6 with 23 disposals and was selected in womens.afl's Team of the Week for that round. In June 2021, Antonio re-signed with the club for two years.

In round 1 of 2022 season 6, Antonio kicked three goals from twelve disposals, including a Goal of the Year contender in the first quarter, in Fremantle's Western Derby win to share the Western Derby Medal with teammate Kiara Bowers; she also won the maximum ten coaches' votes and was named in womens.afl's Team of the Week. Antonio was named among Fremantle's best players in its round 4 win over Collingwood and was best afield in Fremantle's win over the Western Bulldogs a few days later. She was named among Fremantle's best players in its losses to North Melbourne in round 5 and Adelaide in round 8. Antonio was one of three late outs for Fremantle heading into its record-breaking loss to Melbourne in round 9 due to the AFL's health and safety protocols, before returning in round 10 against Gold Coast.

After sitting out the entire 2025 AFL Women's season due to pregnancy, Antonio announced her retirement at Fremantle's Fairest and Best awards night.

== Statistics ==
Updated to the end of the 2025 season.

Legend
G	Goals	K	Kicks	D	Disposals	T	Tackles
B	Behinds	H	Handballs	M	Marks

Season	Team	No.	Games	Totals							Averages (per game)							Votes
Season	Team	No.	Games	G	B	K	H	D	M	T	G	B	K	H	D	M	T	Votes
2017	Fremantle	12	6	2	1	45	25	70	19	27	0.3	0.2	7.5	4.2	11.7	3.2	4.5	0
2018	Fremantle	12	7	3	0	54	40	94	15	31	0.4	0.0	7.7	5.7	13.4	2.1	4.4	0
2019	Fremantle	12	8	5	5	62	20	82	14	24	0.6	0.6	7.8	2.5	10.3	1.8	3.0	0
2020	Fremantle	12	7	4	2	53	32	85	23	30	0.6	0.3	7.6	4.6	12.1	3.3	4.3	0
2021	Fremantle	12	10	1	4	88	36	124	37	39	0.1	0.4	8.8	3.6	12.4	3.7	3.8	0
2022 (S6)	Fremantle	12	11	10	4	102	47	149	33	44	0.7	0.4	9.3	4.3	13.5	3.0	4.0	6
2022 (S7)	Fremantle	12	2	1	1	26	10	36	8	2	0.5	0.5	13.0	5.0	18.0	4.0	1.0	0
2023	Fremantle	12	6	6	1	30	11	41	12	14	1.0	0.2	5.0	1.8	6.8	2.0	2.3	0
2024	Fremantle	12	13	6	11	59	31	90	14	31	0.5	0.8	4.5	2.4	6.9	1.1	2.4	0
2025	Fremantle	12	0	-	-	-	-	-	-	-	0.0	0.0	0.0	0.0	0.0	0.0	0.0	0
Career			70	38	29	519	252	771	175	242	0.5	0.4	7.4	3.6	11.0	2.5	3.5	6

== Personal life ==
Antonio became engaged to Fremantle teammate and captain Kara Donnellan in April 2018, and they married in October 2019.

== Honours and achievements ==
- AFL Women's All-Australian team: 2018
- Fremantle fairest and best: 2018
- Allies representative honours in AFL Women's State of Origin: 2017
- Goal of the Year: 2022 (S6)
- Western Derby Medal: 2022 (S6)
