= Jenna Bruton =

Australian rules footballer

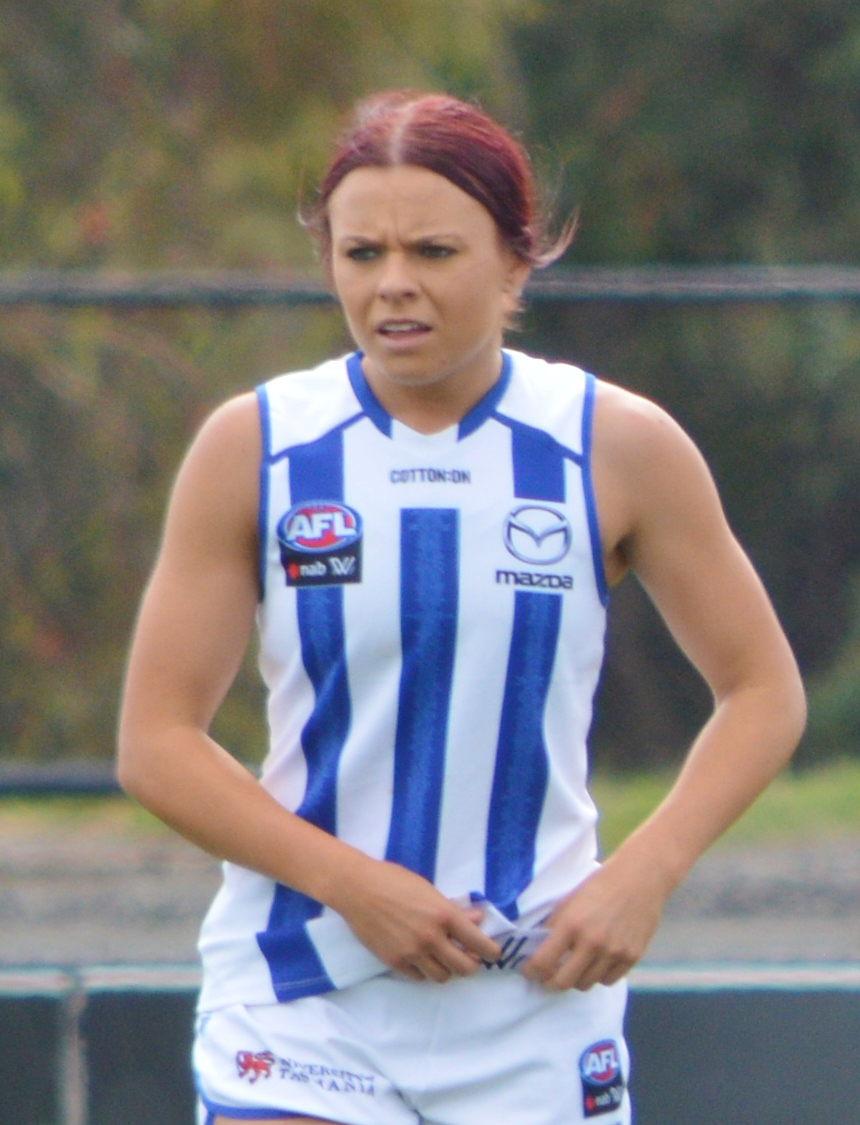
- Bruton with North Melbourne in January 2019

Personal information
- Born: 8 November 1995 (age 30)
- Original team: St Kilda Sharks (VFL Women's) Trentham Saints (KDFL)
- Draft: No. 11, 2017 AFL Women's draft
- Debut: Round 1, 2018, Western Bulldogs vs. Fremantle, at VU Whitten Oval
- Height: 158 cm (5 ft 2 in)
- Position: Midfielder

Club information
- Current club: North Melbourne
- Number: 35

Playing career^{1}
Years	Club	Games (Goals)
2018	Western Bulldogs	8 (3)
2019–	North Melbourne	81 (13)
Total		89 (16)
- ^{1} Playing statistics correct to the end of the 2025 season.

Career highlights
- AFLW: 3× AFLW premiership player: 2018, 2024, 2025; AFL Women's All-Australian squad: 2019; North Melbourne best and fairest: 2019; VWFL/VFLW: VFL Women's Team of the Year: 2017; St Kilda Sharks best and fairest: 2017

Jenna Bruton (born 8 November 1995) is an Australian rules footballer playing with North Melbourne in the AFL Women's (AFLW) competition.

== Early life ==
Bruton grew up in Trentham and began working full-time on her family's potato farm as a teenager. She started playing football at age seven and represented Victoria as a junior, with a career in the sport gaining traction during 2013 by playing in the first women's AFL exhibition match.

In 2016, Bruton chose not to nominate for the inaugural AFLW draft, citing a need to spend more time with her mother who had recently been diagnosed with brain cancer. Her passion for the game was reignited in 2017, and she was selected in the VFL Women's Team of the Year while also winning the club best and fairest award for the St Kilda Sharks.

Bruton's submission for the following AFLW draft was solicited by partner and fellow footballer Jasmine Garner.

== AFL Women's career ==
The 2017 AFL Women's draft saw Bruton drafted by the Western Bulldogs with their third selection and the eleventh overall pick. After making her debut in a 26-point win against Fremantle at VU Whitten Oval in the opening round of the 2018 season, she would go on to be a member of the Bulldogs' premiership team when they defeated Brisbane in the grand final.

In May 2018, Bruton signed with expansion team North Melbourne for the 2019 AFLW season. She enjoyed a breakout year, moving from a pressure forward position to a permanent midfield role, consequently earning selection in the All-Australian squad and winning the club's inaugural best and fairest award.

Bruton re-signed with North Melbourne in April 2019, committing to the club until the end of the 2021 season. She re-signed again with the club in June 2021 for a further two seasons.

Bruton played in North’s 2023 grand final loss to Brisbane, but left the game injured in the first quarter.

== Statistics ==
Statistics are correct to the end of the 2021 season

Legend
G	Goals	K	Kicks	D	Disposals	T	Tackles
B	Behinds	H	Handballs	M	Marks

Season	Team	No.	Games	Totals							Averages (per game)							Votes
Season	Team	No.	Games	G	B	K	H	D	M	T	G	B	K	H	D	M	T	Votes
2018	Western Bulldogs	35	8	3	2	52	39	91	21	37	0.4	0.3	6.5	4.9	11.4	2.6	4.5	0
2019	North Melbourne	35	7	0	0	81	46	127	18	37	0.0	0.0	11.6	6.6	18.1	2.6	5.3	6
2020	North Melbourne	35	7	0	0	68	54	122	15	40	0.0	0.0	9.7	7.7	17.4	2.1	5.7	10
2021	North Melbourne	35	9	0	0	89	74	163	32	32	0.0	0.0	9.9	8.2	18.1	3.6	3.6	8
Career			31	3	2	290	213	503	86	146	0.1	0.1	9.4	6.9	16.2	2.8	4.7	24
