= Kerryn Peterson =

Australian rules footballer (born 1992)

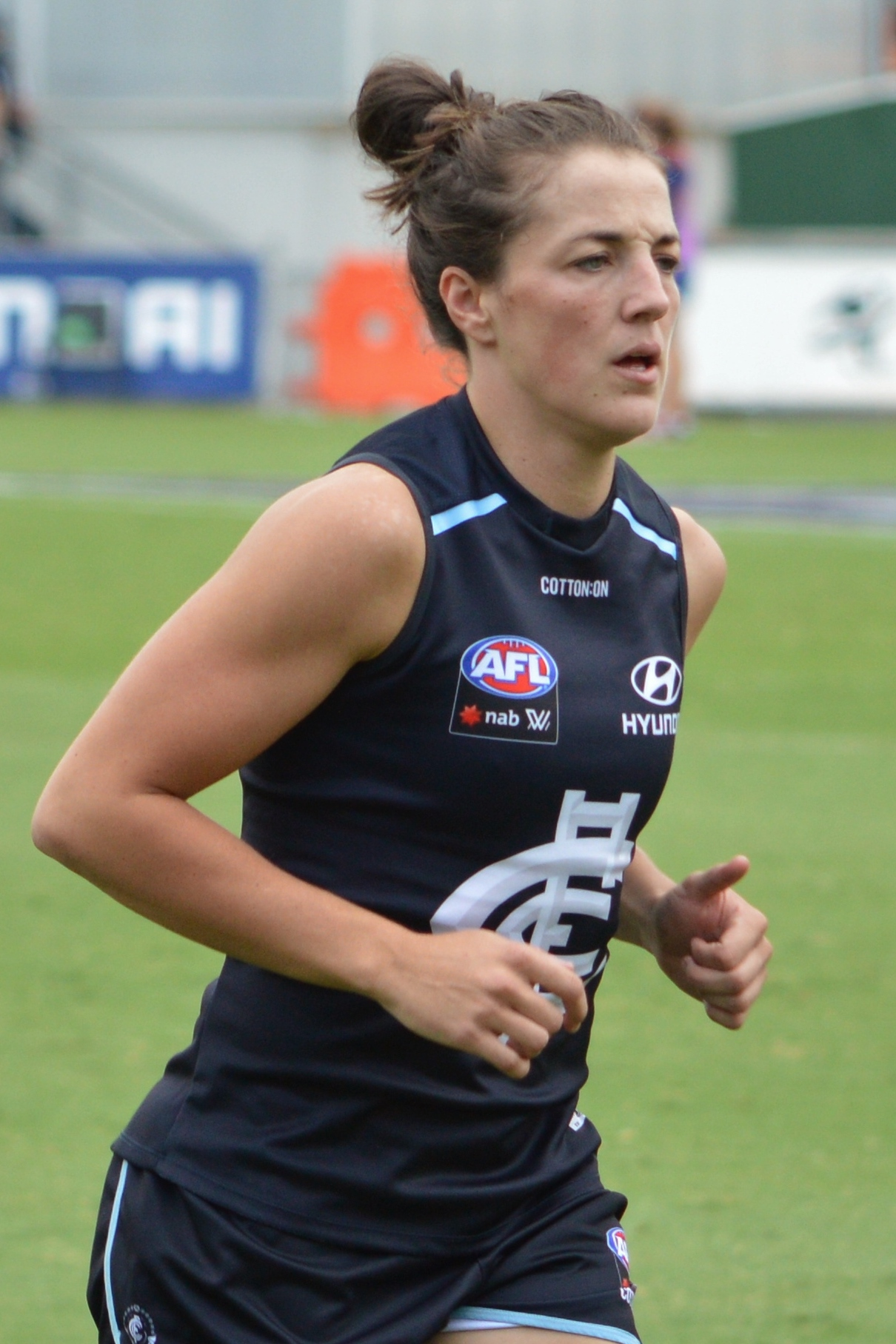
- Peterson playing for Carlton in 2018

Personal information
- Full name: Kerryn Peterson
- Born: 2 March 1992 (age 34); Warrnambool, Victoria
- Original team: Bendigo Thunder (NFNLW)
- Draft: 2017 rookie signing
- Debut: Round 1, 2018, Carlton vs. Collingwood, at Ikon Park
- Height: 173 cm (5 ft 8 in)
- Position: Defender

Club information
- Current club: Carlton
- Number: 9

Playing career^{1}
Years	Club	Games (Goals)
2018–	Carlton	64 (4)
- ^{1} Playing statistics correct to the end of the 2024 season.

Career highlights
- Carlton co-captain: 2020–2021; captain: 2022 (S6)–2024; 3× AFL Women's All-Australian team: 2019, 2020, S6

Kerryn Peterson (née Harrington, born 2 March 1992) is an Australian rules footballer and former basketballer. Peterson currently plays for the Carlton Football Club in the AFL Women's (AFLW), and previously played for the Bendigo Spirit, Australian Institute of Sport, Bulleen Boomers and Adelaide Lightning in the Women's National Basketball League (WNBL) between 2007 and 2017. She is a three-time AFL Women's All-Australian. Peterson served as Carlton co-captain from 2020 to 2021 and as sole captain from 2022 season 6 to 2024.

== Basketball career ==
=== WNBL ===
Peterson began her WNBL career in the inaugural year of the Bendigo Spirit alongside the likes of Kristi Harrower. She was the youngest player in WNBL history to debut aged 15. She would then spend the next two seasons on scholarship and playing in the WNBL for the Australian Institute of Sport. She then had a two-season stint in Bulleen. After a one-year absence from the league, she returned playing for the Adelaide Lightning. For the 2015–16 season she returned to Bendigo. Peterson was re-signed by the Spirit, for the 2016–17 season. Peterson played 152 WNBL games in her career.

=== National team ===
Peterson was a consistent member of the Australian Under 19 National team- Gems. In 2008 she helped them take home the Gold at the Oceania Under-18 Championship and qualify for the World Championship the following year in Thailand. Playing alongside Elizabeth Cambage, the team placed fifth. 2 years later in 2011 she would once again represent the Gems at the junior world championships in Chile, this time as captain. Despite all their best efforts, was one step closer to the podium, but fell short to Brazil, placing fourth. Peterson also captained the Gems to a Gold medal at the youth Olympics in Sydney.

== AFL Women's career ==
On 16 May 2017, Carlton signed Peterson and Maddi Gay to Carlton's rookie list for the 2018 AFL Women's season. Following their impressive development, the pair were promoted to the senior list on 1 September 2017. She made her league debut in the 2018 season's opening match, an eight-point win over Collingwood. The 2020 AFL Women's season saw Peterson obtain her second AFL Women's All-Australian team selection, named in the half-back position. Her third All Australian was awarded in 2022.

== Statistics ==
Updated to the end of the 2024 season.

Legend
G	Goals	K	Kicks	D	Disposals	T	Tackles
B	Behinds	H	Handballs	M	Marks

Season	Team	No.	Games	Totals							Averages (per game)							Votes
Season	Team	No.	Games	G	B	K	H	D	M	T	G	B	K	H	D	M	T	Votes
2018	Carlton	9	7	0	0	34	20	54	15	24	0.0	0.0	4.9	2.9	7.7	2.1	3.4	0
2019	Carlton	9	9	0	0	86	31	117	28	11	0.0	0.0	9.6	3.4	13.0	3.1	1.2	3
2020	Carlton	9	7	0	0	62	34	96	31	13	0.0	0.0	8.9	4.9	13.7	4.4	1.9	0
2021	Carlton	9	9	1	0	83	49	132	25	26	0.1	0.0	9.2	5.4	14.7	2.8	2.9	1
2022 (S6)	Carlton	9	10	0	0	97	46	143	35	24	0.0	0.0	9.7	4.6	14.3	3.5	2.4	3
2022 (S7)	Carlton	9	10	3	1	82	62	144	32	41	0.3	0.1	8.2	6.2	14.4	3.2	4.1	2
2023	Carlton	9	4	0	1	38	22	60	10	13	0.0	0.3	9.5	5.5	15.0	2.5	3.3	0
2024	Carlton	9	8	0	0	62	28	90	10	20	0.0	0.0	7.8	3.5	11.3	1.3	2.5	0
Career			64	4	2	544	292	836	186	172	0.1	0.0	8.5	4.6	13.1	2.9	2.7	9

== Personal life ==
Peterson married her partner, ABC Sport journalist Joel Peterson, in May 2022.

== Honours and achievements ==
- Carlton co-captain: 2020–2021; captain: 2022 (S6)–2024
- 3× AFL Women's All-Australian team: 2019, 2020, S6
