= Western Derby =

Australian rules football match

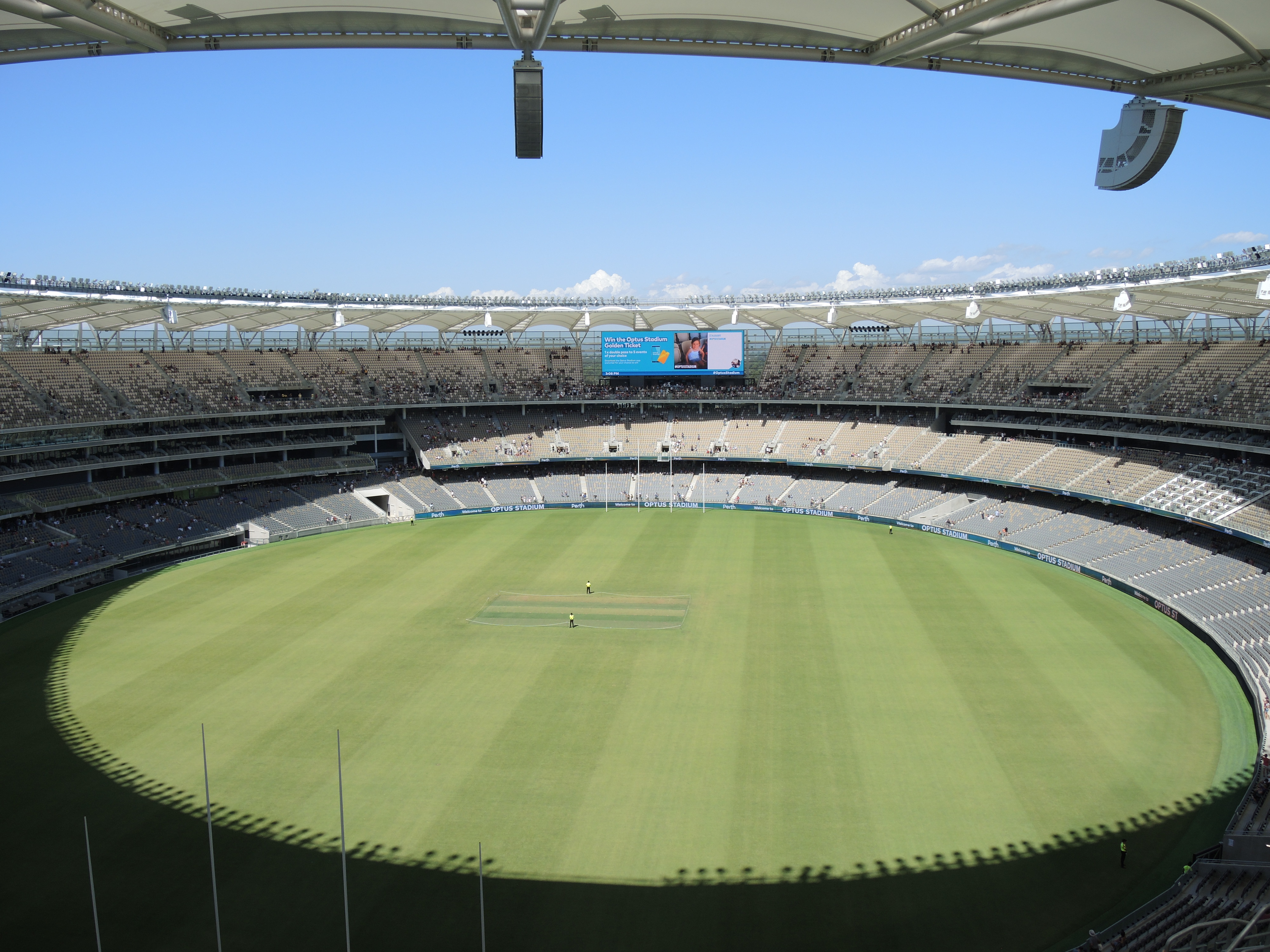
- Optus Stadium in Burswood, Perth. The current home stadium of the Fremantle Dockers and the West Coast Eagles.

- West Coast Fremantle
- Location: Perth, Western Australia
- First meeting: 14 May 1995
- Latest meeting: 24 July 2026
- Next meeting: 2027
- Stadiums: Subiaco Oval (1995–2017); Optus Stadium (2018–present)
- Trophy: RAC WA Trophy

Statistics
- Total meetings: 63
- All-time series (AFL only): West Coast 33 wins Fremantle 30 wins
- Largest victory: West Coast – 117 points (15 April 2000)
- Longest win streak: West Coast, 11 (16 August 2015 – 15 August 2021)
- Current win streak: Fremantle, 5 (28 July 2024 – present)

The Western Derby (/ˈdɜːrbi/) is the name given to the Australian rules football matches between the West Coast Eagles and the Fremantle Dockers, who both participate in the Australian Football League (AFL) and AFL Women's (AFLW).

As both teams are based in Perth, the capital city of Western Australia, the term "derby" is used to describe the match. It has become the most important match for football in Western Australia (outside of finals), with former West Coast player and coach John Worsfold claiming that in the week before a derby that it is the main topic in Perth.

"It's obviously different to the build-up of any normal game... We don't care what else is happening in the country, which is great."

— John Worsfold, Pierik, Jon (24 July 2011). "The West is history". The Sunday Age.

In 2004, during the 175th-anniversary celebrations of the establishment of the Swan River Colony, the Western Derby was named as one of 12 "Heritage Icons", in recognition of "football's key social and historical importance to the State".

Referring to a melee during the Round 21, 2000, Derby, Channel Nine sports reporter Michael Thomson said the match had divided Western Australia and that the "football landscape in WA has been changed forever."

There are two AFL Western Derbies and one AFLW derby every year during the home-and-away season (barring the exceptional COVID-19-affected 2020 season, where only one derby was played). From 1995 until 2017, the derbies were held at Subiaco Oval (with the one exception during this period being the October 2005 post-season exhibition game at The Oval in London). Since 2018, all AFL derbies have been held at Perth Stadium. There has never been a Western Derby finals match, nor a drawn match.

In AFL derbies, West Coast were the dominant team during Fremantle's early years, winning the first nine derbies. Fremantle won their first Western Derby in July 1999. Fremantle are the current holders of the Western Derby Trophy after defeating West Coast by 56 points in Round 6 of the 2026 AFL season. In AFLW derbies, Fremantle is undefeated, winning the first eight games.

The player adjudged best on ground in each AFL derby match is awarded the Glendinning–Allan Medal, named after the inaugural captains of the clubs: Ross Glendinning (West Coast) and Ben Allan (Fremantle).

== Notable derbies ==
=== Derby XII: Round 21, 2000 (aka The Demolition Derby) ===
An infamous derby occurred in Round 21, 2000. Both clubs were out of finals contention, and the derby earlier in the year had recorded the biggest-ever margin, with Scott Cummings' 10-goal effort helping West Coast to a 117-point win; and, in the lead-up to the season's rematch, both teams were talking down the importance of the game with the standard line of "it's only worth four points". However, Clive Waterhouse indicated that something different might happen by saying that "blood would be spilled".

Before the first bounce, West Coast, through Michael Gardiner, went on the attack, pushing and shoving first-year player Matthew Pavlich. The umpires awarded a free kick to Pavlich before the ball was bounced. However, West Coast settled and led by four goals at quarter time with goals to Phillip Read, Andrew Embley and three to Phil Matera. Fremantle's forward line was struggling, with only four goals to half time, including two to Waterhouse, and singles to midfielders Heath Black and Troy Cook, while two goals to Mitchell White, a fourth goal for Matera and one to Chad Morrison in the second quarter saw West Coast go to the half-time break 32 points in front. During the break, a brawl broke out which cleared both teams' benches and resulted in one of the longest tribunal records in recent times.

In the third quarter, Phil Matera kicked his fifth goal, bringing the Eagles lead to 42 points, but Fremantle surged to cut the margin to 18 points at three-quarter time with three goals to Clive Waterhouse and singles to Pavlich and Daniel Bandy.

The last quarter saw Phil Matera carried from the ground on a stretcher after a hard collision with umpire Steve Hanley, and a solid but legal shirtfront by Troy Cook also saw Mitchell White carried from the ground on a stretcher. A six-goal-to-three final quarter—including another two to Waterhouse and singles to Steven Koops, Andrew Shipp, Dale Kickett and Brad Dodd—saw Fremantle hit the lead by two points. With only seconds to spare, the Eagles pushed forward, and a loose ball was unable to be gathered in by makeshift forward Darren Glass, resulting in a rushed behind and a one-point victory for Fremantle, only their second-ever in a Western Derby.

The following suspensions and fines were handed out as a result of the brawl:

- Dale Kickett was suspended for a total of nine matches for striking Phillip Read twice and striking Andrew Embley once.
- Michael Gardiner was suspended for two matches for striking Matthew Pavlich.
- Brad Dodd was suspended for two matches for attempting to strike Phillip Read, while Read was suspended for two matches for striking Dodd in retaliation.
- Seven players from Fremantle (Heath Black, Paul Hasleby, Shaun McManus, Clem Michael, Jason Norrish, Jess Sinclair and Andrew Shipp) and five players from West Coast (Ben Cousins, Andrew Embley, Kane Munro, Michael Gardiner and Phillip Read) were reported for melee involvement. Embley was found not guilty; the remaining players were fined between $2000 and $4000.

The following week, both teams were well beaten, with Fremantle beaten by Brisbane by 107 points at the Gabba, and Melbourne winning by 70 points over the Eagles at Subiaco.

=== London Derby: 2005 ===
The only time the fixture was played outside of Perth was in October 2005 at The Oval in Kennington, South London. West Coast had narrowly finished as runner-up to Sydney the previous month but were missing their vaunted midfield of Cousins, Chris Judd and Daniel Kerr. The game included a third-quarter fight and the Dockers' Jeff Farmer and the Eagles' Adam Hunter kicking four goals each. No video footage has been shared from the game, which Fremantle won by 13.12 (90) to 11.7 (73) in front of nearly 19,000 people, which was a record crowd for an Australian rules football game in England.

=== Derby XXV: Round 3, 2007 ===
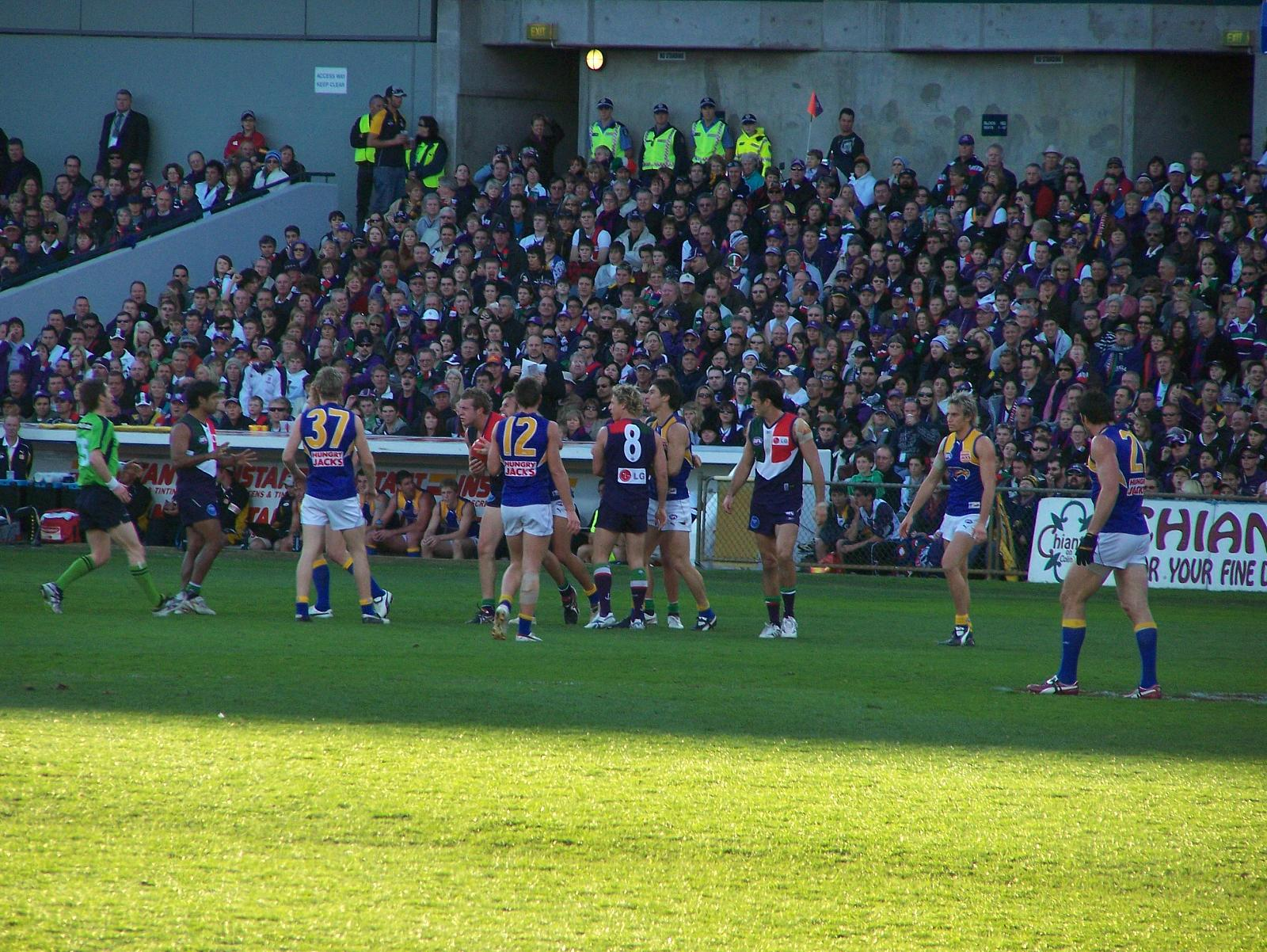
Shaun McManus's farewell game in Round 18, 2008, Western Derby Fremantle home game

The Round 3, 2007, match will be remembered as one of the most controversial and spiteful derbies ever played. Nearing three-quarter time, Fremantle's Des Headland was reported by umpire Stuart Wenn for striking and wrestling with West Coast's Adam Selwood, who made an inappropriate comment about a tattoo on Headland's arm, which depicted his then six-year-old daughter.

The case was heard on 18 April, with Selwood cleared of using abusive language towards Headland. Headland was found guilty of both striking and wrestling with Selwood, but was not suspended because of "exceptional and compelling circumstances by way of provocation".

West Coast won this match by 31 points, and Michael Braun was awarded the Ross Glendinning Medal, ending his acceptance speech with "Let's have a fucking good year" which was broadcast to 550,000 viewers on live television and to the 42,551 in attendance. Braun was fined $500 by the Eagles, but the AFL intervened, severely reprimanded the Eagles, and fined Braun an additional $5,000.

Several weeks after the match, Selwood officially apologised to women, and claimed that he did not mean what he had said to Headland four weeks earlier. Paradoxically, he also claimed that he was badly treated by the media because he was innocent of the charges in the Headland saga and he should have just been allowed to prove his innocence.

=== Derby XXXIV: Round 18, 2011 ===
The closest finish to a derby occurred in Round 18, 2011, when Eagles midfielder Matt Rosa was penalised by umpire Dean Margetts in a deliberate-out-of-bounds decision with West Coast leading by two points in the dying seconds. Having earned a free kick from the decision, Hayden Ballantyne had a chance to win the game for Fremantle with a shot after the siren from 50 metres out on a tight angle; and, while his drop punt looked a goal for much of its journey, it hit the padding on the right-hand goalpost amid a sea of hands from both sides, leaving the Eagles the winners by a single point, 8.17 (65) to Fremantle's 9.10 (64). Ballantyne prematurely celebrated, believing that the kick was a goal and had won the match.

This proved to be the catalyst for both sides as the season wound down. Fremantle slid down the ladder, losing the next six matches in succession to end a disappointing season, while West Coast went on to win their remaining home-and-away matches.

=== Derby XLVIII: Round 20, 2018 ===
Nearly two decades after the most violent derby in its history, another infamous contest occurred in Round 20, 2018. During the third quarter, West Coast midfielder Andrew Gaff struck Fremantle first-year player Andrew Brayshaw in the face in an incident which occurred off the ball and resulted in Brayshaw suffering a broken jaw. Gaff was targeted by Fremantle players for the remainder of the game, until his coach decided to bench him after suffering from a double-team shoulder hit from two Fremantle players. Gaff was sent straight to the AFL Tribunal the following day, where he pleaded guilty to intentionally striking Brayshaw and subsequently suspended for eight AFL matches, thus missing the AFL finals, where West Coast would go on to win the 2018 premiership.

=== Derby LI: 2020 ===
For the first time, due to the 2020 COVID-19 pandemic reducing the season to 17 games, only a single derby was played in 2020. The ground capacity was restricted to half of the maximum to allow for social distancing. The crowd of 25,306 people was the highest for the AFL since the pandemic started, but the lowest ever for a ticketed derby. West Coast won by 30 points, setting a new record of ten consecutive derby wins, dating back to August 2015.

=== Derby LVII: 2023 ===
The derby resembled the one held in 2009, with both Western Australian teams positioned in the bottom 4 of the ladder at the time of the match. Fremantle broke its record of the highest margin in a derby, 101 points. West Coast's score of 4.9 (33) was its lowest ever in a derby.

=== Derby LVIII: 2024 ===
The Fremantle Dockers went in to the Round 6 match heavy favourites. Fremantle had started the season 3-0, before losing two narrow games in a row by under a goal, away in Adelaide, heading into the Derby 3-2. The Eagles headed into the Derby 1-4 to start their season, losing 4 matches by large margins. The Dockers had odds $1.15 to the Eagles $5.50. To much surprise, the Eagles kicked the first seven goals of the game, having a 46-3 lead mid way through the second quarter. The Eagles led by 37 points at half time, before piling on the pain in the third quarter, having a 64 point lead at the last break. The Docker's fought back in the final quarter but the Eagles won comprehensively by 37 points, 16.9 (105) v 10.8 (68). It was one of the greatest upsets in Derby history, putting a dent in Fremantle's season and setting a promising one for the Eagles. It was also highly talked about recruit Harley Reid's first Derby, where he stole the show kicking 3 goals and 19 disposals, placing second with 6 votes in the Glendinning-Allan Medal at just 19 years old and six career games. Eagles superstar Elliot Yeo won the award with 7 votes, winning the award for the second time.

== Western Derby Results (AFL) ==
	Year	Date	Rd	Home Team	Score	Away Team	Score	Ground	Crowd	Result/Winner	M	H2H
1	1995	14 May	7	West Coast	23.13 (151)	Fremantle	9.12 (66)	Subiaco Oval	40,356	West Coast	85	+1
2	1995	3 September	22	Fremantle	8.10 (58)	West Coast	16.15 (111)	Subiaco Oval	39,844	West Coast	53	+2
3	1996	31 March	1	Fremantle	6.9 (45)	West Coast	9.13 (67)	Subiaco Oval	33,041	West Coast	22	+3
4	1996	21 July	16	West Coast	12.10 (82)	Fremantle	7.6 (48)	Subiaco Oval	35,406	West Coast	34	+4
5	1997	13 April	3	West Coast	16.15 (111)	Fremantle	9.17 (71)	Subiaco Oval	39,294	West Coast	40	+5
6	1997	3 August	18	Fremantle	7.7 (49)	West Coast	13.4 (82)	Subiaco Oval	39,711	West Coast	33	+6
7	1998	12 April	3	Fremantle	10.7 (67)	West Coast	14.10 (94)	Subiaco Oval	34,710	West Coast	27	+7
8	1998	2 August	18	West Coast	15.9 (99)	Fremantle	8.12 (60)	Subiaco Oval	37,145	West Coast	39	+8
9	1999	28 March	1	Fremantle	13.20 (98)	West Coast	15.12 (102)	Subiaco Oval	32,680	West Coast	4	+9
10	1999	18 July	16	West Coast	11.6 (72)	Fremantle	17.17 (119)	Subiaco Oval	36,763	Fremantle	47	+8
11	2000	15 April	6	West Coast	28.10 (178)	Fremantle	9.7 (61)	Subiaco Oval	40,460	West Coast	117	+9
12	2000	30 July	21	Fremantle	15.11 (101)	West Coast	15.10 (100)	Subiaco Oval	37,573	Fremantle	1	+8
13	2001	21 April	4	Fremantle	13.10 (88)	West Coast	16.16 (112)	Subiaco Oval	38,804	West Coast	24	+9
14	2001	12 August	19	West Coast	14.14 (98)	Fremantle	9.10 (64)	Subiaco Oval	41,285	West Coast	34	+10
15	2002	31 March	1	West Coast	21.11 (137)	Fremantle	18.10 (118)	Subiaco Oval	39,467	West Coast	19	+11
16	2002	20 July	16	Fremantle	15.10 (100)	West Coast	11.4 (70)	Subiaco Oval	41,779	Fremantle	30	+10
17	2003	27 April	5	Fremantle	10.13 (73)	West Coast	16.12 (108)	Subiaco Oval	41,654	West Coast	35	+11
18	2003	30 August	22	West Coast	11.16 (82)	Fremantle	14.12 (96)	Subiaco Oval	43,027	Fremantle	14	+10
19	2004	1 May	6	West Coast	11.7 (73)	Fremantle	12.11 (83)	Subiaco Oval	42,135	Fremantle	10	+9
20	2004	22 August	21	Fremantle	6.9 (45)	West Coast	13.15 (93)	Subiaco Oval	41,907	West Coast	48	+10
21	2005	9 April	3	Fremantle	12.8 (80)	West Coast	12.16 (88)	Subiaco Oval	42,027	West Coast	8	+11
22	2005	12 August	20	West Coast	19.14 (128)	Fremantle	12.8 (80)	Subiaco Oval	40,720	West Coast	48	+12
23	2006	6 May	6	Fremantle	12.16 (88)	West Coast	12.11 (83)	Subiaco Oval	42,213	Fremantle	5	+11
24	2006	27 August	21	West Coast	8.13 (61)	Fremantle	18.10 (118)	Subiaco Oval	43,527	Fremantle	57	+10
25	2007	14 April	3	Fremantle	11.4 (70)	West Coast	14.17 (101)	Subiaco Oval	42,051	West Coast	31	+11
26	2007	5 August	18	West Coast	14.13 (97)	Fremantle	19.10 (124)	Subiaco Oval	43,096	Fremantle	27	+10
27	2008	5 April	3	West Coast	10.13 (73)	Fremantle	12.15 (87)	Subiaco Oval	39,027	Fremantle	14	+9
28	2008	3 August	18	Fremantle	17.14 (116)	West Coast	12.11 (83)	Subiaco Oval	42,096	Fremantle	33	+8
29	2009	2 May	6	West Coast	9.20 (74)	Fremantle	13.9 (87)	Subiaco Oval	41,654	Fremantle	13	+7
30	2009	25 July	17	Fremantle	10.11 (71)	West Coast	8.18 (66)	Subiaco Oval	39,536	Fremantle	5	+6
31	2010	2 May	6	West Coast	10.13 (73)	Fremantle	17.9 (111)	Subiaco Oval	40,886	Fremantle	38	+5
32	2010	1 August	18	Fremantle	24.16 (160)	West Coast	13.7 (85)	Subiaco Oval	40,451	Fremantle	75	+4
33	2011	15 May	8	West Coast	14.12 (96)	Fremantle	9.9 (63)	Subiaco Oval	40,567	West Coast	33	+5
34	2011	24 July	18	Fremantle	9.10 (64)	West Coast	8.17 (65)	Subiaco Oval	41,055	West Coast	1	+6
35	2012	27 May	9	West Coast	11.18 (84)	Fremantle	5.6 (36)	Subiaco Oval	40,905	West Coast	48	+7
36	2012	4 August	19	Fremantle	17.11 (113)	West Coast	6.12 (48)	Subiaco Oval	39,694	Fremantle	65	+6
37	2013	23 March	1	Fremantle	16.12 (108)	West Coast	11.14 (80)	Subiaco Oval	39,629	Fremantle	28	+5
38	2013	14 July	16	West Coast	14.9 (93)	Fremantle	19.7 (121)	Subiaco Oval	39,839	Fremantle	28	+4
39	2014	4 May	7	West Coast	7.12 (54)	Fremantle	11.7 (73)	Subiaco Oval	40,476	Fremantle	19	+3
40	2014	28 June	15	Fremantle	13.10 (88)	West Coast	11.15 (81)	Subiaco Oval	40,490	Fremantle	7	+2
41	2015	19 April	3	West Coast	12.9 (81)	Fremantle	17.9 (111)	Subiaco Oval	39,138	Fremantle	30	+1
42	2015	16 August	20	Fremantle	11.14 (80)	West Coast	15.14 (104)	Subiaco Oval	41,959	West Coast	24	+2
43	2016	9 April	3	West Coast	12.20 (92)	Fremantle	8.11 (59)	Subiaco Oval	40,555	West Coast	33	+3
44	2016	7 August	20	Fremantle	9.10 (64)	West Coast	17.8 (110)	Subiaco Oval	36,215	West Coast	46	+4
45	2017	29 April	6	West Coast	16.7 (103)	Fremantle	9.8 (62)	Subiaco Oval	40,836	West Coast	41	+5
46	2017	16 July	17	Fremantle	5.14 (44)	West Coast	11.8 (74)	Subiaco Oval	38,722	West Coast	30	+6
47	2018	29 April	6	Fremantle	12.9 (81)	West Coast	13.11 (89)	Optus Stadium	56,521	West Coast	8	+7
48	2018	5 August	20	West Coast	21.16 (142)	Fremantle	13.6 (84)	Optus Stadium	57,375	West Coast	58	+8
49	2019	13 April	4	West Coast	10.9 (69)	Fremantle	7.14 (56)	Optus Stadium	58,219	West Coast	13	+9
50	2019	6 July	16	Fremantle	2.19 (31)	West Coast	19.8 (122)	Optus Stadium	56,358	West Coast	91	+10
51	2020^{a}	19 July	7	Fremantle	5.2 (32)	West Coast	9.8 (62)	Optus Stadium	25,306	West Coast	30	+11
52	2021	2 May	7	West Coast	20.12 (132)	Fremantle	11.7 (73)	Optus Stadium	0^{c}	West Coast	59	+12
53	2021	15 August	22	Fremantle	12.7 (79)	West Coast	9.10 (64)	Optus Stadium	51,692	Fremantle	15	+11
54	2022	3 April	3	West Coast	7.5 (47)	Fremantle	15.12 (102)	Optus Stadium	38,920	Fremantle	55	+10
55	2022	13 August	22	Fremantle	9.17 (71)	West Coast	7.5 (47)	Optus Stadium	53,818	Fremantle	24	+9
56	2023	2 April	3	Fremantle	16.12 (108)	West Coast	9.13 (67)	Optus Stadium	56,090	Fremantle	41	+8
57	2023	12 August	22	West Coast	4.9 (33)	Fremantle	20.14 (134)	Optus Stadium	51,172	Fremantle	101	+7
58	2024	20 April	6	West Coast	16.9 (105)	Fremantle	10.8 (68)	Optus Stadium	54,473	West Coast	37	+8
59	2024	27 July	20	Fremantle	17.8 (110)	West Coast	11.9 (75)	Optus Stadium	56,536	Fremantle	35	+7
60	2025	30 March	3	West Coast	10.8 (68)	Fremantle	15.16 (106)	Optus Stadium	53,289	Fremantle	38	+6
61	2025	26 July	20	Fremantle	18.18 (126)	West Coast	12.5 (77)	Optus Stadium	54,384	Fremantle	49	+5
62	2026	19 April	6	West Coast	5.11 (41)	Fremantle	14.13 (97)	Optus Stadium	54,232	Fremantle	56	+4
63	2026	24 July	20	Fremantle	16.16 (112)	West Coast	6.6 (42)	Optus Stadium	56,616	Fremantle	70	+3

== Western Derby Results (AFLW) ==
	Year	Date	Rd	Home Team	Score	Away Team	Score	Ground	Crowd	Result/Winner	M	H2H
1	2020	15 February	2	West Coast	2.3 (15)	Fremantle	9.6 (60)	Optus Stadium	35,185	Fremantle	45	+1
2	2021	7 February	2	Fremantle	2.11 (23)	West Coast	2.2 (14)	Fremantle Oval	0^{b}	Fremantle	9	+2
3	2021	7 March	6^{d}	West Coast	1.2 (8)	Fremantle	11.9 (75)	Optus Stadium	7,469	Fremantle	67	+3
4	2022 (S6)	8 January	1	Fremantle	6.7 (43)	West Coast	2.3 (15)	Fremantle Oval	5,533	Fremantle	28	+4
5	2022 (S7)	22 September	5	West Coast	3.5 (23)	Fremantle	3.8 (26)	Optus Stadium	6,552	Fremantle	3	+5
6	2023	3 September 2023	1	Fremantle	3.8 (26)	West Coast	2.7 (19)	Fremantle Oval	3,790	Fremantle	7	+6
7	2024	19 October 2024	8	West Coast	1.6 (12)	Fremantle	5.5 (35)	Leederville Oval	6,047	Fremantle	23	+7
8	2025	14 September 2025	5	Fremantle	3.5 (23)	West Coast	2.4 (16)	Fremantle Oval	2,502	Fremantle	7	+8
9	2026	4 October 2026	8	West Coast	5.9 (39)	Fremantle	4.3 (27)	Sullivan Logistics Stadium	5,711	West Coast	12	+7

=== Derby Medal winners ===
Round	Year	Winner	Ref.
Round 2	2020	Kiara Bowers	
Round 2	2021	Kiara Bowers (2)	
Round 6	2021	Kiara Bowers (3)	
Round 1	2022 (S6)	Kiara Bowers (4); Ebony Antonio	
Round 5	2022 (S7)	Hayley Miller	
Round 1	2023	Ella Roberts	
Round 8	2024	Mim Strom	
Round 5	2025	Orlagh Lally	
Round 8	2026	Ella Roberts	

== Timeline of results ==
WCE
FRE
WCE
FRE
WCE
FRE
WCE
FRE
WCE
FRE
WCE
FRE
WCE
FRE
WCE
FRE
WCE
FRE
│
1995
│
1997
│
1999
│
2001
│
2003
│
2005
│
2007
│
2009
│
2011
│
2013
│
2015
│
2017
│
2019
│
2021
│
2023
│
2025
│
2027
AFL
FRE
WCE
│
2020
│
2021
│
2022
│
2023
│
2024
│
2025
│
2026
│
2027
AFLW

== Statistics ==
Up-to-date at the completion of Derby 62

=== Most Goals in One Game ===
Player	Date	Round	Club	Goals	Behinds
Scott Cummings	2000	Round 6	West Coast Eagles	10	2
Matthew Pavlich	2012	Round 19	Fremantle	8	2
Josh Kennedy	2016	Round 20	West Coast Eagles	7	2
Clive Waterhouse	2000	Round 21	Fremantle	7	2
Josh Kennedy	2017	Round 6	West Coast Eagles	6	2
Tony Modra	1999	Round 16	Fremantle	6	2
Troy Wilson	2002	Round 1	West Coast Eagles	6	1

=== Most Career Goals ===
Player	Club	Goals	Behinds	Games	Goals/Game
Matthew Pavlich	Fremantle	61	35	34	1.79
Josh Kennedy	West Coast Eagles	55	34	21	2.62
Jack Darling	West Coast Eagles	52	31	26	2.00
Mark LeCras	West Coast Eagles	43	22	18	2.39
Phil Matera	West Coast Eagles	37	16	16	2.31
Michael Walters	Fremantle	36	17	20	1.80
Jye Amiss	Fremantle	24	13	8	3.00
Hayden Ballantyne	Fremantle	24	10	15	1.60
Jamie Cripps	West Coast Eagles	23	25	23	1.00
Jeff Farmer	Fremantle	19	10	11	1.73

=== Games played ===
Player	Club	Derbies
Matthew Pavlich	Fremantle	34
David Mundy	Fremantle	31
Shannon Hurn	West Coast Eagles	28
Dean Cox	West Coast Eagles	27
Jack Darling	West Coast Eagles	26
Aaron Sandilands	Fremantle	26
Andrew Gaff	West Coast Eagles	25
Darren Glass	West Coast Eagles	24
Jamie Cripps	West Coast Eagles	23
Michael Johnson	Fremantle	22

=== Brownlow Votes ===
Brownlow Votes through the end of the 2025 AFL season.

Player	Club	Votes	Games	Average
Daniel Kerr	West Coast Eagles	15	17	0.88
Caleb Serong	Fremantle	14	12	1.17
Guy McKenna	West Coast Eagles	13	11	1.18
Stephen Hill	Fremantle	12	19	0.63
Chris Judd	West Coast Eagles	11	11	1.00
Ben Cousins	West Coast Eagles	11	20	0.55
Paul Hasleby	Fremantle	11	20	0.55
Aaron Sandilands	Fremantle	11	26	0.42
Matthew Pavlich	Fremantle	11	34	0.32
Peter Bell	Fremantle	10	15	0.66

== Other Western Derbies ==
=== AFL Women's ===
In preparation for the 2017 launch of the AFL women's league competition, the AFL held 10 Exhibition Series matches during 2016. The only match held in Perth featured both a women's side from the Fremantle Football Club & the West Coast Eagles, played as a curtain-raiser for the men's Western Derby, won by the West Coast Eagles. The first Western Derby in the AFLW took place on 15 February 2020, when the West Coast Eagles lost to the Fremantle Dockers at Optus Stadium. As of 2026, West Coast are the current holders of the Derby Trophy after finally defeating Fremantle in Round 8, ending Fremantle's Derby win streak at 8 matches since its inception.

== Notes ==
^{a}For the 2020 season only, there was only one Western Derby due to the premiership season being shortened to 17 rounds as a result of the COVID-19 pandemic in Australia.
^{b}Due to a local transmission of COVID-19 in Western Australia in early 2021, the two Perth-based AFLW teams were forced to isolate as part of a five-day lockdown in Perth, rather than travelling to South Australia for their scheduled matches. The AFL instead fixtured a derby between the two sides, held without general public access.
^{c}Due to a local transmission of COVID-19 in Western Australia in May 2021, a decision was made by Western Australia premier Mark McGowan to ban spectators from attending the match only hours before the first bounce.
^{d}A second Western Derby was scheduled for the two clubs due to WA's border restrictions precluding travel to and from Victoria, and to allow fans to attend after the first Derby in round two was played behind closed doors.

== See also ==
- Showdown
- Sydney Derby (Battle Of The Bridge)
- QClash
