= List of Fremantle Football Club captains =

This is a list of all captains of the Fremantle Football Club, an Australian rules football club in the Australian Football League and AFL Women's.

== AFL ==
Seasons	Captain(s)	Games as captain	Games as acting captain	Games as captain - total
1995–1996	Ben Allan	30	0	30
1997–1998	Peter Mann	29	12	41
1999	Chris Bond	19	0	19
2000–2001	Shaun McManus; Adrian Fletcher	43; 41	0; 0	43; 41
2002–2006	Peter Bell	107	0	107
2007–2015	Matthew Pavlich	182	8	190
2016	David Mundy	18		
2017–2022	Nat Fyfe	92	4	96
2023–	Alex Pearce	54		54

== AFL Women's ==
Seasons	Captain(s)	Games as captain	Games as acting captain	Games as captain - total
2017–2021	Kara Antonio	37	0	37
2022–2023	Hayley Miller	32	4	36
2024–	Ange Stannett	12	0	12
