= Fremantle fairest and best (AFL Women's) =

- Awarded for: The best and fairest player of the Fremantle Football Club in the AFL Women's
- Country: Australia
- Presented by: Fremantle Football Club
- First award: 2017
- Currently held by: Aisling McCarthy

In the AFL Women's (AFLW), the Fremantle fairest and best award is awarded to the best and fairest player at the Fremantle Football Club during the home-and-away season. The award has been awarded annually since the competition's inaugural season in 2017. Kiara Bowers, with 4 victories, is the only multiple winner of the award.

== Recipients ==
Season	Recipient(s)	Ref.
2017	Dana Hooker	
2018	Ebony Antonio	
2019	**Kiara Bowers**	
2020	**Kiara Bowers** (2)	
2021	**Kiara Bowers** (3)	
2022 (S6)	**Hayley Miller**	
2022 (S7)	**Kiara Bowers** (4)	
2023	**Ange Stannett**	
2024	**Mim Strom**	
2025	**Aisling McCarthy**	

Legend
**Bold**	Denotes current player
	Player won AFL Women's best and fairest in same season

== See also ==
- Doig Medal (list of Fremantle Football Club best and fairest winners in the Australian Football League)
