= 2019 AFL Women's All-Australian team =

- Sponsored by: Virgin Australia
- Date: 2 April 2019
- Venue: Docklands Stadium
- Country: Australia

The 2019 AFL Women's All-Australian team represents the best-performed players of the 2019 AFL Women's season. It was announced on 2 April 2019 as a complete women's Australian rules football team of 21 players. The team is honorary and does not play any games.

== Initial squad ==
The initial 40-woman All-Australian squad was announced on 21 March. Adelaide had the most players selected in the initial squad with nine, and every team had at least two representatives. Nine players from the 2018 team were among those selected.

Club	Total	Player(s)
Adelaide	9	Sarah Allan, Jess Foley, Anne Hatchard, Eloise Jones, Ebony Marinoff, Erin Phillips, Marijana Rajcic, Chelsea Randall, Stevie-Lee Thompson
Brisbane	4	Ally Anderson, Nat Exon, Kate Lutkins, Jess Wuetschner
Carlton	4	Brianna Davey, Kerryn Harrington, Gab Pound, Maddy Prespakis
Collingwood	2	Ashleigh Brazill, Jaimee Lambert
Fremantle	6	Ebony Antonio, Kiara Bowers, Sabreena Duffy, Kellie Gibson, Dana Hooker, Gemma Houghton
Geelong	2	Meg McDonald, Maddy McMahon
Greater Western Sydney	2	Rebecca Beeson, Alyce Parker
Melbourne	4	Tegan Cunningham, Elise O'Dea, Karen Paxman, Lauren Pearce
North Melbourne	5	Jenna Bruton, Jess Duffin, Jasmine Garner, Emma Kearney, Emma King
Western Bulldogs	2	Ellie Blackburn, Monique Conti

== Final team ==
The final team was announced on 2 April. Premiers Adelaide had the most selections with five, and every team except Greater Western Sydney had at least one representative. Four players from the 2018 team were selected, three of whom – Adelaide co-captain Chelsea Randall, Melbourne's Karen Paxman and North Melbourne captain Emma Kearney – achieved selection for the third consecutive year. Adelaide's other co-captain, Erin Phillips, was announced as the All-Australian captain and Randall, the previous year's All-Australian captain, was announced as the vice-captain.

2019 AFL Women's All-Australian team
B:	Meg McDonald (Geelong)	Ashleigh Brazill (Collingwood)	
HB:	Jess Duffin (North Melbourne)	Chelsea Randall (Adelaide) (vice-captain)	Kerryn Harrington (Carlton)
C:	Emma Kearney (North Melbourne)	Kiara Bowers (Fremantle)	Karen Paxman (Melbourne)
HF:	Erin Phillips (Adelaide) (captain)	Jasmine Garner (North Melbourne)	Monique Conti (Western Bulldogs)
F:	Gemma Houghton (Fremantle)	Stevie-Lee Thompson (Adelaide)	
Foll:	Lauren Pearce (Melbourne)	Ebony Marinoff (Adelaide)	Maddy Prespakis (Carlton)
Int:	Emma King (North Melbourne)	Gab Pound (Carlton)	Ally Anderson (Brisbane)
Int:	Anne Hatchard (Adelaide)	Dana Hooker (Fremantle)	
Coach:	Matthew Clarke (Adelaide)		

Note: the position of coach in the AFL Women's All-Australian team is traditionally awarded to the coach of the premiership-winning team.
