= Kiara Bowers =

Australian rules footballer (born 1991)

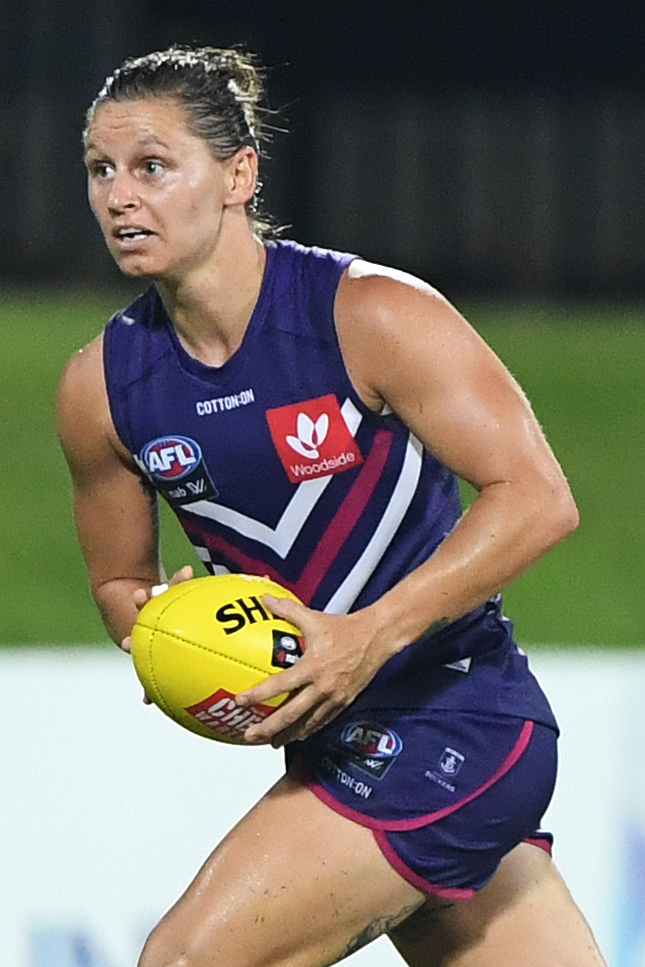
- Bowers playing for Fremantle in January 2019

Personal information
- Nickname: Turbo
- Born: 16 November 1991 (age 35)
- Original team: Coastal Titans (WAWFL)
- Draft: Marquee signing, 2016 AFLW draft
- Debut: Round 1, 2019, Fremantle vs. Melbourne, at Casey Fields
- Height: 170 cm (5 ft 7 in)
- Position: Midfielder

Club information
- Current club: Fremantle
- Number: 2

Playing career^{1}
Years	Club	Games (Goals)
2017–	Fremantle	73 (14)
- ^{1} Playing statistics correct to the end of the 2026 season.

Career highlights
- AFL Women's best and fairest: 2021; AFLW Coaches Association Champion Player of the Year: 2021; 3× AFL Women's All-Australian team: 2019, 2020, 2021; 4× Fremantle best and fairest: 2019, 2020, 2021, 2022 (S7); 4× Derby Medal: 2020, 2× 2021, 2022 (S6)

Kiara Bowers (born 16 November 1991) is an Australian rules footballer playing for the Fremantle Football Club in the AFL Women's (AFLW).

Bowers is considered one of the leading women’s footballers from Western Australia.

== Early life ==
Kiara was raised in Perth, Western Australia, as one of nine siblings. Bowers played rugby, softball, athletics and basketball prior to taking up Australian rules. Though she didn't play Australian rules she grew up supporting the Melbourne Football Club. Inspired by her older brother Andrew's efforts in the WAFL with South Fremantle and Swan Districts, Kiara took up Australian rules while at high school with the Coastal Titans. She went on to be a standout performer, winning the league best and fairest four times and representing Western Australia five times.

Bowers signed with Melbourne Football Club in 2013 and was part of the team that played in exhibition series matches in 2013, 2014, 2015 prior to the commencement of the AFLW.

== Career ==
In July 2016, Bowers was announced as Fremantle's second marquee signing ahead of the inaugural AFL Women's season. However, in August 2016, 5 months before the start of the season, Bowers ruptured her anterior cruciate ligament whilst playing for the Coastal Titans in the West Australian Women's Football League. She would not play for Fremantle at all in the first two seasons of the AFLW.

She made her debut in the four-point win against Melbourne at Casey Fields in the opening round of the 2019 season.

She had an outstanding debut season, finishing second behind Erin Phillips in the league's player-voted Most Valuable Player award, sixth in the AFL Women's best and fairest award, winning Fremantle's best and fairest award, and being named in the 2019 AFL Women's All-Australian team. In 2020 she played in every game of Fremantle's undefeated season, winning the Best Player award in the first-ever AFL Women's Western Derby and was again named in the All-Australian team. She was also named the AFLPA's Most Courageous Player.

Bowers continued her exceptional form into 2021, sharing the AFL Women's best and fairest award with Collingwood's Brianna Davey, being selected in her third consecutive All-Australian team, as vice-captain, and claiming the AFLW Champion Player of the Year Award. Bowers achieved selection in Champion Data's 2021 AFLW All-Star stats team, after leading the league for pressure points, pressure acts, tackles and forced turnovers in the 2021 AFL Women's season.

Bowers was placed on Fremantle's inactive list for the 2024 season following the announcement of her pregnancy. She returned to the field in 2025, starting strong with a perfect 10 coaches' votes in the season-opening win against Port Adelaide. She finished the year leading the league in tackles for the home-and-away season, averaging 12 per game. Bowers was voted by her peers as the Most Courageous Player for the second time in her career and finished equal seventh in the AFL Women's best and fairest award. She finished third in Fremantle's fairest and best award.

In December 2025, Bowers signed a one-year contract extension through to the end of the 2026 season.

== Personal life ==
Bowers is a carpenter who lives with her partner Adele and their sons Nate and Luca.

== Statistics ==
Statistics are correct to the end of the 2025 season.

Legend
G	Goals	K	Kicks	D	Disposals	T	Tackles
B	Behinds	H	Handballs	M	Marks
†	Led the league for the season	±	Won that season's AFLW B&F

Season	Team	No.	Games	Totals							Averages (per game)							Votes
Season	Team	No.	Games	G	B	K	H	D	M	T	G	B	K	H	D	M	T	Votes
2017	Fremantle	2	0	–	–	–	–	–	–	–	–	–	–	–	–	–	–	0
2018	Fremantle	2	0	–	–	–	–	–	–	–	–	–	–	–	–	–	–	0
2019	Fremantle	2	8	3	3	116	21	137	25	89^{†}	0.4	0.4	14.5	2.6	17.1	3.1	11.1^{†}	7
2020	Fremantle	2	7	1	1	98	25	123	18	99^{†}	0.1	0.1	14.0	3.6	17.6	2.6	14.1^{†}	12
2021	Fremantle	2	10	2	4	158	53	211	25	110^{†}	0.2	0.4	15.8	5.3	21.1	2.5	11.0^{†}	15^{±}
2022 (S6)	Fremantle	2	8	1	1	136	40	176	21	92	0.1	0.1	17.0	5.0	22.0	2.6	11.5	13
2022 (S7)	Fremantle	2	10	1	2	161	55	216	23	146^{†}	0.1	0.2	16.1	5.5	21.6	2.3	14.6^{†}	14
2023	Fremantle	2	6	0	0	96	28	124	17	73	0.0	0.0	16.0	4.7	20.7	2.8	12.2	3
2024	Fremantle	2	0	–	–	–	–	–	–	–	–	–	–	–	–	–	–	0
2025	Fremantle	2	12	2	3	186	70	256	32	145^{†}	0.2	0.3	15.5	5.8	21.3	2.7	12.1^{†}	13
Career			61	10	14	951	292	1243	161	754	0.2	0.2	15.6	4.8	20.4	2.6	12.4	77
