= 2021 AFL Women's season =

Fifth season of the AFL Women's (AFLW) competition

Overview
- Date: 28 January – 17 April 2021
- Teams: 14
- Premiers: Brisbane; 1st premiership
- Runners-up: Adelaide; 1st runners-up result
- Minor premiers: Adelaide; 1st minor premiership
- Best and fairest: Kiara Bowers (Fremantle); Brianna Davey (Collingwood); 15 votes
- Leading goalkicker: Darcy Vescio (Carlton); 16 goals

Attendance
- Matches played: 68
- Total attendance: 155,908 (2,293 per match)
- Highest (H&A): 9,552 (round 6, West Coast v Fremantle)
- Highest (finals): 22,934 (grand final, Adelaide v Brisbane)

The 2021 AFL Women's season was the fifth season of the AFL Women's (AFLW) competition, the highest-level senior women's Australian rules football competition in Australia. The season featured 14 clubs and ran from 28 January to 17 April, comprising a nine-round home-and-away season followed by a three-week finals series featuring the top six clubs.

Brisbane won the premiership, defeating Adelaide by 18 points in the 2021 AFL Women's Grand Final. Adelaide won the minor premiership by finishing atop the home-and-away ladder with a 7–2 win–loss record. Fremantle's Kiara Bowers and Collingwood's Brianna Davey tied for the AFL Women's best and fairest award as the league's best and fairest players, and Carlton's Darcy Vescio won her second AFL Women's leading goalkicker award as the league's leading goalkicker.

== Format ==
The previous two AFLW seasons were formatted with the assistance of conferences, which split the league's clubs into two ranking tables. The AFL elected to remove the conferences for the 2021 season and revert to a single ladder. Under the terms of the existing contractual bargaining agreement between the players and the AFL, teams will play nine regular season matches, before a three-week finals series for the top six teams occurs. Owing to the fact clubs will not get the opportunity to play all of their opponents once, the AFL placed the teams together in a single 2020 ladder and then broke them up into brackets to attempt a fair fixture for the 2021 season.

The season was played during the second year of the COVID-19 pandemic. As the season began, Australia had largely settled into a paradigm of most states maintaining zero COVID-19 cases outside of their international travel quarantine systems; this allowed football games to be played in front of crowds, usually with reduced capacity, and unhindered interstate travel was permitted without quarantine. However, the different state governments often responded quickly to small numbers or even single virus cases being discovered in the community; this meant border restrictions or quarantine periods were at times re-introduced at short notice, impacting interstate travel for games; and, in some cases, that city- or state-wide lockdowns could be imposed within the impacted states, precluding football activities altogether. The season's original nine-round fixture was discarded due to such restrictions after only one week, in favour of a floating fixture released around any restrictions in place at the time.

== Home-and-away season ==
All starting times are local time.

=== Round 1 ===
	Round 1
Thursday, 28 January (7:15 pm)	Carlton 4.3 (27)	def. by	Collingwood 5.3 (33)	Ikon Park (crowd: 6,712)	Report
Friday, 29 January (7:10 pm)	St Kilda 8.3 (51)	def.	Western Bulldogs 6.6 (42)	RSEA Park (crowd: 2,523)	Report
Saturday, 30 January (2:10 pm)	Gold Coast 5.5 (35)	def. by	Melbourne 9.2 (56)	Metricon Stadium (crowd: 1,902)	Report
Saturday, 30 January (2:10 pm)	West Coast 2.6 (18)	def. by	Adelaide 8.8 (56)	Mineral Resources Park (crowd: 1,929)	Report
Sunday, 31 January (12:10 pm)	Geelong 1.3 (9)	def. by	North Melbourne 11.5 (71)	GMHBA Stadium (crowd: 3,701)	Report
Sunday, 31 January (2:10 pm)	Richmond 1.6 (12)	def. by	Brisbane Lions 5.11 (41)	Swinburne Centre (crowd: 988)	Report
Sunday, 31 January (1:10 pm)	Fremantle 8.10 (58)	def.	Greater Western Sydney 4.4 (28)	Fremantle Oval (crowd: 3,195)	Report

=== Round 2 ===
	Round 2
Friday, 5 February (7:45 pm)	Western Bulldogs 6.6 (42)	def.	Carlton 5.6 (36)	VU Whitten Oval (crowd: 3,479)	Report
Saturday, 6 February (3:10 pm)	Collingwood 6.9 (45)	def.	Geelong 2.4 (16)	Victoria Park (crowd: 2,938)	Report
Saturday, 6 February (5:10 pm)	Melbourne 7.2 (44)	def.	Richmond 2.4 (16)	Casey Fields (crowd: 2,581)	Report
Sunday, 7 February (1:10 pm)	North Melbourne 5.6 (36)	def.	St Kilda 1.4 (10)	Arden Street Oval (crowd: 1,977)	Report
Sunday, 7 February (2:10 pm)	Brisbane Lions 10.5 (65)	def.	Gold Coast 0.2 (2)	Hickey Park (crowd: 2,101)	Report
Sunday, 7 February (5:10 pm)	Greater Western Sydney 2.3 (15)	def. by	Adelaide 9.8 (62)	Blacktown International Sportspark (crowd: 0)	Report
Sunday, 7 February (4:15 pm)	Fremantle 2.11 (23)	def.	West Coast 2.2 (14)	Fremantle Oval (crowd: 0)	Report
The matches in this round were altered during the week prior to the round, after a COVID-19 case in Perth resulted in a five-day lockdown in Western Australia for West Coast and Fremantle, and quarantine restrictions for Adelaide and Greater Western Sydney clubs returning from their Round 1 games in Perth. Four Round 2 matches were cancelled: Greater Western Sydney vs West Coast at Norwood Oval, Adelaide vs Fremantle at Norwood Oval, Collingwood vs Gold Coast at Victoria Park and Brisbane Lions vs Geelong at Hickey Park – with the eight clubs refixtured into matches not requiring interstate travel. The Western Derby was added to the schedule only after the Western Australian lockdown was raised on 5 February.; Gold Coast's score of 0.2 (2) vs the Brisbane Lions was the lowest in the history of the competition.; The Western Derby was played in torrential rain, and produced the lowest match aggregate score for both Fremantle and West Coast.

=== Round 3 ===
	Round 3
Friday, 12 February (7:10 pm)	Geelong 1.3 (9)	def. by	Western Bulldogs 3.6 (24)	GMHBA Stadium (crowd: 1,124)	Report
Saturday, 13 February (3:10 pm)	Greater Western Sydney 2.6 (18)	def.	Gold Coast 1.2 (8)	Blacktown ISP Oval (crowd: 625)	Report
Saturday, 13 February (5:10 pm)	St Kilda 2.4 (16)	def. by	Carlton 6.4 (40)	RSEA Park (crowd: 0)	Report
Saturday, 13 February (7:10 pm)	Melbourne 9.6 (60)	def.	North Melbourne 8.3 (51)	Casey Fields (crowd: 0)	Report
Sunday, 14 February (12:40 pm)	Adelaide 1.7 (13)	def. by	Fremantle 7.1 (43)	Norwood Oval (crowd: 2,717)	Report
Sunday, 14 February (3:10 pm)	Richmond 4.7 (31)	def. by	Collingwood 7.6 (48)	Swinburne Centre (crowd: 0)	Report
Monday, 15 February (4:15 pm)	Brisbane Lions 10.5 (65)	def.	West Coast 2.8 (20)	Hickey Park (crowd: 0)	Report
A COVID-19 outbreak in Melbourne saw new border restrictions imposed on travel from Victoria. Planned fixtures between Brisbane Lions and Collingwood at Hickey Park and Richmond and West Coast at Swinburne Centre were switched on Thursday 11 February.; Matches in Victoria on Saturday and Sunday were played behind closed doors after a five-day lockdown was imposed in the state on 13–17 February.

=== Round 4 ===
	Round 4
Friday, 19 February (7:10 pm)	St Kilda 7.9 (51)	def.	Geelong 3.4 (22)	RSEA Park (crowd: 1,454)	Report
Saturday, 20 February (3:10 pm)	Carlton 8.3 (51)	def.	Richmond 7.4 (46)	Ikon Park (crowd: 2,212)	Report
Saturday, 20 February (2:10 pm)	Fremantle 7.13 (55)	def.	Gold Coast 1.0 (6)	Fremantle Oval (crowd: 2,410)	Report
Saturday, 20 February (7:10 pm)	North Melbourne 0.8 (8)	def. by	Collingwood 4.4 (28)	Marvel Stadium (crowd: 2,254)	Report
Sunday, 21 February (12:10 pm)	Brisbane Lions 5.3 (33)	def. by	Adelaide 6.9 (45)	Hickey Park (crowd: 1,518)	Report
Sunday, 21 February (3:10 pm)	Western Bulldogs 6.1 (37)	def.	Melbourne 2.12 (24)	VU Whitten Oval (crowd: 3,180)	Report
Sunday, 21 February (5:10 pm)	Greater Western Sydney 7.6 (48)	def.	West Coast 4.4 (28)	Blacktown ISP Oval (crowd: 974)	Report
Round 4 fixtures were again set to ensure no interstate travel into or out of Victoria was required.

=== Round 5 ===
	Round 5
Friday, 26 February (7:10 pm)	Geelong 2.1 (13)	def. by	Richmond 9.6 (60)	GMHBA Stadium (crowd: 1,829)	Report
Saturday, 27 February (3:10 pm)	Western Bulldogs 7.5 (47)	def.	Greater Western Sydney 3.4 (22)	VU Whitten Oval (crowd: 2,461)	Report
Saturday, 27 February (2:10 pm)	Fremantle 1.8 (14)	def. by	Brisbane Lions 3.7 (25)	Fremantle Oval (crowd: 3,423)	Report
Saturday, 27 February (7:10 pm)	North Melbourne 9.5 (59)	def.	Carlton 6.1 (37)	UTAS Stadium (crowd: 820)	Report
Sunday, 28 February (12:40 pm)	Adelaide 8.13 (61)	def.	St Kilda 1.2 (8)	Norwood Oval (crowd: 2,497)	Report
Sunday, 28 February (3:10 pm)	Collingwood 7.7 (49)	def.	Melbourne 1.8 (14)	Victoria Park (crowd: 2,931)	Report
Sunday, 28 February (2:10 pm)	West Coast 5.4 (34)	def.	Gold Coast 4.9 (33)	Mineral Resources Park (crowd: 1,119)	Report
Richmond recorded its first ever AFLW win, following ten consecutive losses since its entry to the competition in 2020.

=== Round 6 ===
	Round 6
Friday, 5 March (5:10 pm)	Richmond 5.2 (32)	def. by	North Melbourne 10.7 (67)	Swinburne Centre (crowd: 803)	Report
Saturday, 6 March (3:10 pm)	Greater Western Sydney 2.5 (17)	def. by	Brisbane Lions 7.13 (55)	Manuka Oval (crowd: 1,847)	Report
Saturday, 6 March (4:40 pm)	Adelaide 13.7 (85)	def.	Gold Coast 2.3 (15)	Norwood Oval (crowd: 2,087)	Report
Saturday, 6 March (7:10 pm)	Melbourne 9.12 (66)	def.	St Kilda 3.4 (22)	Casey Fields (crowd: 1,096)	Report
Sunday, 7 March (12:40 pm)	Carlton 10.4 (64)	def.	Geelong 4.7 (31)	Ikon Park (crowd: 1,764)	Report
Sunday, 7 March (2:40 pm)	Collingwood 7.9 (51)	def.	Western Bulldogs 2.3 (15)	Victoria Park (crowd: 3,017)	Report
Sunday, 7 March (1:40 pm)	West Coast 1.2 (8)	def. by	Fremantle 11.9 (75)	Optus Stadium (crowd: 9,552)	Report
West Coast and Fremantle played a second Western Derby for the season, as border and quarantine restrictions following Victoria's local COVID-19 cases in February precluded the Western Australian clubs from playing any Victorian club without hubbing. It was the first time two sides had met twice in the same AFL Women's home-and-away season.

=== Round 7 ===
	Round 7
Friday, 12 March (6:40 pm)	Gold Coast 4.2 (26)	def. by	Richmond 6.5 (41)	Metricon Stadium (crowd: 907)	Report
Saturday, 13 March (3:10 pm)	St Kilda 3.7 (25)	def. by	Greater Western Sydney 7.3 (45)	RSEA Park (crowd: 791)	Report
Saturday, 13 March (5:10 pm)	North Melbourne 5.7 (37)	def.	Western Bulldogs 3.8 (26)	North Hobart Oval (crowd: 1,034)	Report
Saturday, 13 March (7:10 pm)	Melbourne 6.7 (43)	def.	Adelaide 2.3 (15)	Casey Fields (crowd: 445)	Report
Sunday, 14 March (1:10 pm)	Carlton 6.5 (41)	def. by	Fremantle 6.9 (45)	Ikon Park (crowd: 2,048)	Report
Sunday, 14 March (3:10 pm)	Brisbane Lions 4.11 (35)	def.	Collingwood 4.8 (32)	VU Whitten Oval (crowd: 0)	Report
Monday, 15 March (2:10 pm)	West Coast 8.5 (53)	def.	Geelong 2.2 (14)	Mineral Resources Park (crowd: 848)	Report
The Brisbane Lions vs. Collingwood match was originally scheduled for Hickey Park in Brisbane, but one day prior to the match it was moved to Whitten Oval in Melbourne, after a positive COVID-19 case was discovered in Queensland. The match was played behind closed doors.

=== Round 8 ===
	Round 8
Friday, 19 March (5:10 pm)	Gold Coast 4.3 (27)	def. by	Carlton 13.9 (87)	Metricon Stadium (crowd: 272)	Report
Saturday, 20 March (1:10 pm)	Geelong 1.3 (9)	def. by	Greater Western Sydney 2.4 (16)	GMHBA Stadium (crowd: 963)	Report
Saturday, 20 March (3:10 pm)	Collingwood 8.11 (59)	def.	St Kilda 2.1 (13)	Victoria Park (crowd: 2,228)	Report
Saturday, 20 March (4:10 pm)	Brisbane Lions 4.11 (35)	def.	North Melbourne 2.8 (20)	Gabba (crowd: 6,613)	Report
Sunday, 21 March (12:40 pm)	Richmond 5.12 (42)	def.	West Coast 5.4 (34)	Swinburne Centre (crowd: 619)	Report
Sunday, 21 March (3:40 pm)	Adelaide 12.6 (78)	def.	Western Bulldogs 3.4 (22)	Norwood Oval (crowd: 1,749)	Report
Sunday, 21 March (3:10 pm)	Fremantle 4.8 (32)	def. by	Melbourne 5.7 (37)	Fremantle Oval (crowd: 2,233)	Report
Carlton's score of 13.9 (87) set a new record as the highest score in history of the competition.

=== Round 9 ===
	Round 9
Friday, 26 March (5:10 pm)	Western Bulldogs 7.3 (45)	def.	Richmond 5.2 (32)	VU Whitten Oval (crowd: 1,985)	Report
Saturday, 27 March (1:10 pm)	North Melbourne 4.6 (30)	def.	Fremantle 4.5 (29)	Arden Street Oval (crowd: 1,223)	Report
Saturday, 27 March (3:10 pm)	Melbourne 6.2 (38)	def.	Brisbane Lions 6.0 (36)	Casey Fields (crowd: 743)	Report
Saturday, 27 March (4:10 pm)	Gold Coast 3.6 (24)	def. by	Geelong 6.5 (41)	Metricon Stadium (crowd: 1,506)	Report
Sunday, 28 March (12:10 pm)	Adelaide 4.7 (31)	def.	Collingwood 2.5 (17)	Norwood Oval (crowd: 2,314)	Report
Sunday, 28 March (4:10 pm)	Greater Western Sydney 4.7 (31)	def. by	Carlton 4.8 (32)	Blacktown ISP Oval (crowd: 903)	Report
Sunday, 28 March (3:10 pm)	West Coast 3.2 (20)	def. by	St Kilda 11.10 (76)	Mineral Resources Park (crowd: 809)	Report

== Ladder ==
Pos	Team	Pld	W	L	D	PF	PA	PP	Pts	Qualification
1	Adelaide	9	7	2	0	446	214	208.4	28	Finals series
2	Brisbane Lions (P)	9	7	2	0	390	200	195.0	28	Finals series
3	Collingwood	9	7	2	0	362	190	190.5	28	Finals series
4	Melbourne	9	7	2	0	382	293	130.4	28	Finals series
5	Fremantle	9	6	3	0	374	202	185.1	24	Finals series
6	North Melbourne	9	6	3	0	379	266	142.5	24	Finals series
7	Carlton	9	5	4	0	415	330	125.8	20	
8	Western Bulldogs	9	5	4	0	300	340	88.2	20	
9	Greater Western Sydney	9	4	5	0	240	324	74.1	16	
10	Richmond	9	3	6	0	312	369	84.6	12	
11	St Kilda	9	3	6	0	272	391	69.6	12	
12	West Coast	9	2	7	0	229	432	53.0	8	
13	Geelong	9	1	8	0	164	408	40.2	4	
14	Gold Coast	9	0	9	0	176	482	36.5	0	

Updated to match(es) played on 17 March 2021. Source: Womens.AFL
Rules for classification: 1) points; 2) percentage; 3) number of points for.
(P) Premiers

== Progression by round ==
- Numbers highlighted in green indicates the team finished the round inside the top 6.
- Numbers highlighted in blue indicates the team finished in first place for that round.
- Numbers highlighted in red indicates the team finished in last place for that round.

	Team	1	2	3	4	5	6	7	8	9
1	Adelaide	4_{3}	8_{3}	8_{6}	12_{4}	16_{4}	20_{4}	20_{4}	24_{3}	28_{1}
2	Brisbane Lions	4_{2}	8_{1}	12_{1}	12_{3}	16_{2}	20_{3}	24_{2}	28_{1}	28_{2}
3	Collingwood	4_{6}	8_{6}	12_{3}	16_{2}	20_{1}	24_{1}	24_{3}	28_{2}	28_{3}
4	Melbourne	4_{5}	8_{4}	12_{4}	12_{5}	12_{7}	16_{6}	20_{6}	24_{5}	28_{4}
5	Fremantle	4_{4}	8_{5}	12_{2}	16_{1}	16_{3}	20_{2}	24_{1}	24_{4}	24_{5}
6	North Melbourne	4_{1}	8_{2}	8_{5}	8_{7}	12_{6}	16_{5}	20_{5}	20_{6}	24_{6}
7	Carlton	0_{9}	0_{9}	4_{8}	8_{8}	8_{8}	12_{8}	12_{8}	16_{7}	20_{7}
8	Western Bulldogs	0_{8}	4_{7}	8_{7}	12_{6}	16_{5}	16_{7}	16_{7}	16_{8}	20_{8}
9	Greater Western Sydney	0_{11}	0_{11}	4_{10}	8_{10}	8_{10}	8_{10}	12_{9}	16_{9}	16_{9}
10	Richmond	0_{13}	0_{12}	0_{11}	0_{11}	4_{11}	4_{11}	8_{10}	12_{10}	12_{10}
11	St Kilda	4_{7}	4_{8}	4_{9}	8_{9}	8_{9}	8_{9}	8_{11}	8_{12}	12_{11}
12	West Coast	0_{12}	0_{10}	0_{12}	0_{12}	4_{12}	4_{12}	8_{12}	8_{11}	8_{12}
13	Geelong	0_{14}	0_{14}	0_{14}	0_{13}	0_{14}	0_{13}	0_{14}	0_{14}	4_{13}
14	Gold Coast	0_{10}	0_{13}	0_{13}	0_{14}	0_{13}	0_{14}	0_{13}	0_{13}	0_{14}

== Finals series ==
Qualifying Finals
4	Melbourne	5.10 (40)
5	Fremantle	3.5 (23)
3	Collingwood	7.8 (50)
6	North Melbourne	7.2 (44)

Preliminary Finals
1	Adelaide	5.3 (33)
Melbourne	1.9 (15)
2	Brisbane Lions	7.3 (45)
Collingwood	6.5 (41)

Grand Final
Adelaide	3.2 (20)
Brisbane Lions	6.2 (38)

=== Qualifying finals ===
	Qualifying finals
QF B: Saturday, 3 April (1:05 pm)	Melbourne 5.10 (40)	def.	Fremantle 3.5 (23)	Casey Fields (crowd: 1,174)	Report
QF A: Saturday, 3 April (3:10 pm)	Collingwood 7.8 (50)	def.	North Melbourne 7.2 (44)	Victoria Park (crowd: 3,010)	Report

=== Preliminary finals ===
	Preliminary finals
PF1: Saturday, 10 April (1:40 pm)	Adelaide 5.3 (33)	def.	Melbourne 1.9 (15)	Adelaide Oval (crowd: 6,382)	Report
PF2: Saturday, 10 April (4:10 pm)	Brisbane Lions 7.3 (45)	def.	Collingwood 6.5 (41)	Gabba (crowd: 4,435)	Report

=== Grand final ===
	Grand Final
Saturday, 17 April (1:30 pm)	Adelaide 3.2 (20)	def. by	Brisbane Lions 6.2 (38)	Adelaide Oval (crowd: 22,934)	Report

== Win–loss table ==
+	Win	Qualified for finals
−	Loss	Eliminated

Team	1	2	3	4	5	6	7	8	9	QF	PF	GF	Ranking
Adelaide	WCE; 38	GWS; 47	Frem; 30	BL; 12	StK; 53	GCS; 70	Melb; 28	WB; 56	Coll; 14	X	Melb; 18	BL; 18	2
Brisbane Lions	Rich; 29	GCS; 63	WCE; 45	Adel; 12	Frem; 11	GWS; 38	Coll; 3	NM; 15	Melb; 2	X	Coll; 4	Adel; 18	1
Carlton	Coll; 6	WB; 6	StK; 24	Rich; 5	NM; 22	Geel; 33	Frem; 4	GCS; 60	GWS; 1	X	X	X	7
Collingwood	Carl; 6	Geel; 29	Rich; 17	NM; 20	Melb; 35	WB; 36	BL; 3	StK; 46	Adel; 14	NM; 6	BL; 4	X	3
Fremantle	GWS; 30	WCE; 9	Adel; 30	GCS; 49	BL; 11	WCE; 67	Carl; 4	Melb; 5	NM; 1	Melb; 17	X	X	5
Geelong	NM; 62	Coll; 29	WB; 15	StK; 29	Rich; 47	Carl; 33	WCE; 39	GWS; 7	GCS; 17	X	X	X	13
Gold Coast	Melb; 21	BL; 63	GWS; 10	Frem; 49	WCE; 1	Adel; 70	Rich; 15	Carl; 60	Geel; 17	X	X	X	14
Greater Western Sydney	Frem; 30	Adel; 47	GCS; 10	WCE; 20	WB; 25	BL; 38	StK; 20	Geel; 7	Carl; 1	X	X	X	9
Melbourne	GCS; 21	Ric; 28	NM; 9	WB; 13	Coll; 35	StK; 44	Adel; 28	Frem; 5	BL; 2	Frem; 17	Adel; 18	X	4
North Melbourne	Geel; 62	StK; 26	Melb; 9	Coll; 20	Carl; 22	Rich; 35	WB; 11	BL; 15	Frem; 1	Coll; 6	X	X	6
Richmond	BL; 29	Melb; 28	Coll; 17	Carl; 5	Geel; 47	NM; 35	GCS; 15	WCE; 8	WB; 13	X	X	X	10
St Kilda	WB; 9	NM; 26	Carl; 24	Geel; 29	Adel; 53	Melb; 44	GWS; 20	Coll; 46	WCE; 56	X	X	X	11
West Coast	Adel; 38	Frem; 9	BL; 45	GWS; 20	GCS; 1	Frem; 67	Geel; 39	Rich; 8	StK; 56	X	X	X	12
Western Bulldogs	StK; 9	Carl; 6	Geel; 15	Melb; 13	GWS; 25	Coll; 36	NM; 11	Adel; 56	Rich; 13	X	X	X	8

== Awards ==
=== League awards ===
- The league best and fairest was jointly awarded to Kiara Bowers of Fremantle and Brianna Davey of Collingwood, who polled 15 votes each.
- The leading goalkicker was awarded to Darcy Vescio of Carlton, who kicked 16 goals during the home and away season.
- The Rising Star was awarded to Tyla Hanks of Melbourne.
- The best on ground medal in the AFL Women's Grand Final was won by Kate Lutkins of Brisbane Lions.
- The goal of the year was awarded to Courtney Hodder of Brisbane Lions.
- The mark of the year was awarded to Danielle Ponter of Adelaide.
- AFLW Players Association awards:
  - The most valuable player was awarded to Brianna Davey of Collingwood.
  - The most courageous player was awarded to Chelsea Randall of Adelaide.
  - The best captain was awarded to Ellie Blackburn of Western Bulldogs.
  - The best first year player was awarded to Ellie McKenzie of Richmond.
- The AFLW Coaches Association awards:
  - The champion player of the year was awarded to Kiara Bowers of Fremantle.
  - The senior coach of the year was awarded to Craig Starcevich of Brisbane Lions.
- Brianna Davey was named captain of the All-Australian team. Twelve of the fourteen clubs had at least one representative in the 21-woman team.
- The minor premiership was won by Adelaide.
- The wooden spoon was "won" by Gold Coast.

=== Best and fairests ===
Club	Award name	Player	Ref.
Adelaide	Club Champion	Ebony Marinoff	
Brisbane Lions	Best and fairest	Ally Anderson	
Carlton	Best and fairest	Darcy Vescio	
Collingwood	Best and fairest	Brianna Davey	
Fremantle	Fairest and best	Kiara Bowers	
Geelong	Best and fairest	Amy McDonald	
Gold Coast	Club Champion	Lauren Ahrens	
Greater Western Sydney	Gabrielle Trainor Medal	Alyce Parker	
Melbourne	Best and fairest	Tyla Hanks & Karen Paxman	
North Melbourne	Best and fairest	Jasmine Garner	
Richmond	Best and fairest	Monique Conti	
St Kilda	Best and fairest	Georgia Patrikios	
Western Bulldogs	Best and fairest	Ellie Blackburn	
West Coast	Club Champion	Isabella Lewis	

=== Leading goalkickers ===
- Numbers highlighted in blue indicates the player led the season's goal kicking tally at the end of that round.

Rank	Player	Team	1	2	3	4	5	6	7	8	9	Total
1	Darcy Vescio	Carlton	1_{1}	0_{1}	0_{1}	3_{4}	2_{6}	2_{8}	1_{9}	5_{14}	2_{16}	16
2	Gemma Houghton	Fremantle	3_{3}	1_{4}	2_{6}	0_{6}	0_{6}	5_{11}	1_{12}	1_{13}	1_{14}	14
2	Chloe Molloy	Collingwood	2_{2}	1_{3}	1_{4}	2_{6}	3_{9}	2_{11}	0_{11}	2_{13}	1_{14}	14
2	Katie Brennan	Richmond	0_{0}	0_{0}	0_{0}	2_{2}	3_{5}	1_{6}	3_{9}	2_{11}	3_{14}	14
5	Dakota Davidson	Brisbane Lions	1_{1}	4_{5}	2_{7}	1_{8}	0_{8}	2_{10}	0_{10}	1_{11}	2_{13}	13
6	Erin Phillips	Adelaide	2_{2}	1_{3}	1_{4}	4_{8}	1_{9}	2_{11}	0_{11}	1_{12}	0_{12}	12
6	Isabel Huntington	Western Bulldogs	2_{2}	1_{3}	1_{4}	2_{6}	3_{9}	0_{9}	2_{11}	0_{11}	1_{12}	12
8	Kate Hore	Melbourne	2_{2}	2_{4}	1_{5}	0_{5}	0_{5}	1_{6}	3_{9}	2_{11}	0_{11}	11
9	Courtney Wakefield	Richmond	1_{1}	0_{1}	1_{2}	3_{5}	2_{7}	1_{8}	1_{9}	0_{9}	1_{10}	10
9	Cora Staunton	Greater Western Sydney	0_{0}	0_{0}	0_{0}	4_{4}	0_{4}	0_{4}	3_{7}	1_{8}	2_{10}	10

== Coach changes ==
Club	Outgoing coach	Manner of departure	Date of vacancy	Incoming coach	Date of appointment
Gold Coast	David Lake	Resigned	11 April 2021	Cameron Joyce	2 June 2021
Geelong	Paul Hood	Resigned	10 May 2021	Daniel Lowther	29 June 2021
St Kilda	Peta Searle	Resigned	24 June 2021	Nick Dal Santo	2 August 2021
West Coast	Daniel Pratt	End of contract	7 September 2021	Michael Prior	7 September 2021

== Club leadership ==
Club	Coach	Captain(s)	Vice-captain(s)	Leadership group	Ref
Adelaide	Matthew Clarke	Chelsea Randall		Sarah Allan, Ange Foley, Eloise Jones	
Brisbane Lions	Craig Starcevich	Emma Zielke	Breanna Koenen	Emily Bates, Shannon Campbell, Kate Lutkins	
Carlton	Daniel Harford	Kerryn Harrington, Katie Loynes		Alison Downie, Nicola Stevens, Darcy Vescio	
Collingwood	Stephen Symonds	Steph Chiocci, Brianna Davey	Sharni Norder		
Fremantle	Trent Cooper	Kara Antonio		Ebony Antonio, Kiara Bowers, Hayley Miller, Gabby O'Sullivan	
Geelong	Paul Hood	Meg McDonald	Jordan Ivey	Renee Garing, Madeline Keryk, Nina Morrison, Aasta O'Connor	
Gold Coast	David Lake	Hannah Dunn, Sam Virgo		Sarah Perkins, Jade Pregelj, Jamie Stanton	
Greater Western Sydney	Alan McConnell	Alicia Eva		Jessica Dal Pos, Pepa Randall, Cora Staunton, Britt Tully	
Melbourne	Mick Stinear	Daisy Pearce	Karen Paxman	Libby Birch, Maddi Gay, Tyla Hanks, Kate Hore, Sarah Lampard, Lily Mithen	
North Melbourne	Darren Crocker	Emma Kearney		Jasmine Garner, Emma King, Ashleigh Riddell	
Richmond	Ryan Ferguson	Katie Brennan	Sarah Hosking	Christina Bernardi, Harriet Cordner, Sabrina Frederick, Phoebe Monahan, Alana Woodward	
St Kilda	Peta Searle	Cat Phillips, Hannah Priest, Kate Shierlaw, Rhiannon Watt	Tilly Lucas-Rodd, Kate McCarthy		
West Coast	Daniel Pratt	Emma Swanson	Dana Hooker	Courtney Guard, Alicia Janz, Parris Laurie	
Western Bulldogs	Nathan Burke	Ellie Blackburn	Brooke Lochland	Ashleigh Guest, Bailey Hunt, Isabel Huntington, Kirsty Lamb, Bonnie Toogood	
