= List of AFL Women's debuts in 2017 =

The inaugural AFL Women's (AFLW) season in 2017 saw 214 players make their senior debut for the eight clubs then comprising the AFLW.

== Summary ==
Summary of debuts in 2017
Club	AFLW debuts
Adelaide	25
Brisbane	25
Carlton	28
Collingwood	27
Fremantle	28
Greater Western Sydney	28
Melbourne	26
Western Bulldogs	27
Total	214

== Debuts ==
Name	Club	Age at debut	Debut round	Games for club	Goals for club	Notes
Ebony Marinoff	Adelaide	19 years, 81 days	1	100	16	2017 AFL Women's Rising Star winner
Anne Hatchard	Adelaide	18 years, 334 days	1	95	37	
Stevie-Lee Thompson	Adelaide	24 years, 318 days	1	94	27	
Sarah Allan	Adelaide	19 years, 77 days	1	88	0	
Chelsea Randall	Adelaide	25 years, 235 days	1	78	38	
Justine Mules	Adelaide	22 years, 51 days	1	49	4	
Erin Phillips	Adelaide	31 years, 261 days	1	46	50	2017 AFL Women's best and fairest
Ange Foley	Adelaide	28 years, 53 days	1	40	2	
Deni Varnhagen	Adelaide	24 years, 101 days	1	38	6	
Dayna Cox	Adelaide	23 years, 176 days	1	32	6	
Rhiannon Metcalfe	Adelaide	25 years, 130 days	1	26	1	
Courtney Cramey	Adelaide	31 years, 68 days	1	20	2	
Jenna McCormick	Adelaide	22 years, 156 days	2	20	9	
Sarah Perkins	Adelaide	23 years, 193 days	1	17	13	
Jess Sedunary	Adelaide	26 years, 86 days	1	17	6	
Sally Riley	Adelaide	26 years, 235 days	1	14	4	
Georgia Bevan	Adelaide	23 years, 238 days	1	13	1	
Abbey Holmes	Adelaide	26 years, 028 days	1	11	3	Pick 103, 2016 AFL Women's draft
Talia Radan	Adelaide	28 years, 271 days	1	10	0	
Heather Anderson	Adelaide	22 years, 190 days	1	8	0	
Kellie Gibson	Adelaide	20 years, 240 days	1	8	4	
Rachael Killian	Adelaide	22 years, 210 days	2	8	2	
Tayla Thorn	Adelaide	18 years, 249 days	1	5	0	
Sophie Armitstead	Adelaide	22 years, 106 days	2	4	0	
Monique Hollick	Adelaide	27 years, 58 days	1	3	0	Pick 136, 2016 AFL Women's draft
Ally Anderson	Brisbane	20 years, 174 days	1	100	13	
Breanna Koenen	Brisbane	22 years, 36 days	1	98	3	Pick 50, 2016 AFL Women's draft
Shannon Campbell	Brisbane	20 years, 134 days	1	95	9	2016 free agent
Emily Bates	Brisbane	21 years, 110 days	1	66	9	Pick 2, 2016 AFL Women's draft
Kate Lutkins	Brisbane	28 years, 250 days	1	52	3	
Emma Zielke	Brisbane	28 years, 292 days	1	41	4	2016 priority signing
Jess Wuetschner	Brisbane	24 years, 283 days	1	38	37	
Sharni Webb	Brisbane	25 years, 206 days	1	31	1	
Sabrina Frederick-Traub	Brisbane	20 years, 83 days	1	23	15	2016 marquee signing, round 4 2017 AFL Women's Rising Star nominee
Kate McCarthy	Brisbane	24 years, 104 days	1	23	16	
Leah Kaslar	Brisbane	31 years, 147 days	1	21	0	
Kaitlyn Ashmore	Brisbane	25 years, 89 days	1	16	5	
Brittany Gibson	Brisbane	24 years, 293 days	1	16	5	
Jamie Stanton	Brisbane	21 years, 90 days	1	16	0	
Tahlia Randall	Brisbane	18 years, 252 days	1	15	9	
Sam Virgo	Brisbane	29 years, 351 days	1	15	0	
Megan Hunt	Brisbane	21 years, 46 days	1	14	1	
Nicole Hildebrand	Brisbane	23 years, 75 days	1	13	0	
Selina Goodman	Brisbane	21 years, 25 days	1	8	0	
Tayla Harris	Brisbane	19 years, 295 days	1	8	4	
Nikki Wallace	Brisbane	22 years, 190 days	1	8	0	
Jordan Membrey	Brisbane	21 years, 55 days	4	5	1	
Shaleise Law	Brisbane	18 years, 196 days	1	3	0	
Kate Deegan	Brisbane	20 years, 164 days	4	1	0	
Delissa Kimmince	Brisbane	27 years, 301 days	6	1	0	
Breann Moody	Carlton	19 years, 336 days	1	85	26	
Darcy Vescio	Carlton	23 years, 184 days	1	84	64	2016 marquee signing, 2017 AFL Women's leading goalkicker
Gab Pound	Carlton	22 years, 110 days	1	73	6	
Lauren Brazzale	Carlton	23 years, 90 days	1	41	7	
Alison Downie	Carlton	32 years, 201 days	1	39	9	
Katie Loynes	Carlton	30 years, 317 days	1	36	7	
Natalie Plane	Carlton	20 years, 183 days	1	36	5	
Sarah Hosking	Carlton	21 years, 63 days	1	30	5	Pick 19, 2016 AFL Women's draft
Tilly Lucas-Rodd	Carlton	20 years, 291 days	1	18	2	Pick 99, 2016 AFL Women's draft, round 5 2017 AFL Women's Rising Star nominee
Brianna Davey	Carlton	22 years, 21 days	1	17	3	2016 marquee signing
Shae Audley	Carlton	28 years, 235 days	1	16	2	
Kate Gillespie-Jones	Carlton	25 years, 283 days	1	13	0	
Danielle Hardiman	Carlton	22 years, 58 days	1	12	0	
Lauren Arnell	Carlton	29 years, 325 days	1	11	4	
Kate Shierlaw	Carlton	27 years, 349 days	2	10	3	
Laura Attard	Carlton	30 years, 146 days	1	8	0	
Alison Brown	Carlton	19 years, 135 days	1	7	0	
Bianca Jakobsson	Carlton	23 years, 310 days	1	7	4	
Bella Ayre	Carlton	18 years, 56 days	1	6	4	Round 5 2017 AFL Women's Rising Star nominee
Nat Exon	Carlton	24 years, 58 days	1	5	0	2016 rookie player signing
Madeline Keryk	Carlton	21 years, 331 days	1	8	0	
Sarah Last	Carlton	22 years, 196 days	1	5	0	
Rebecca Privitelli	Carlton	22 years, 39 days	2	5	1	
Jess Kennedy	Carlton	26 years, 206 days	1	4	0	
Tahni Nestor	Carlton	25 years, 359 days	4	3	1	
Jordan Ivey	Carlton	24 years, 142 days	6	3	1	
Kate Darby	Carlton	26 years, 085 days	2	2	0	
Hayley Trevean	Carlton	28 years, 221 days	7	1	0	
Stacey Livingstone	Collingwood	29 years, 11 days	1	77	1	
Brittany Bonnici	Collingwood	19 years, 184 days	1	73	8	Pick 27, 2016 AFL Women's draft, round 6 2017 AFL Women's Rising Star nominee
Ruby Schleicher	Collingwood	18 years, 324 days	1	70	5	Pick 137, 2016 AFL Women's draft
Sophie Casey	Collingwood	25 years, 104 days	1	63	2	2016 free agent
Steph Chiocci	Collingwood	28 years, 59 days	1	55	8	Pick 11, 2016 AFL Women's draft
Sarah D'Arcy	Collingwood	25 years, 165 days	1	24	10	Pick 22, 2016 AFL Women's draft
Emma Grant	Collingwood	22 years, 210 days	1	20	2	
Cecilia McIntosh	Collingwood	37 years, 227 days	1	17	1	
Melissa Kuys	Collingwood	29 years, 64 days	2	15	2	Pick 118, 2016 AFL Women's draft
Amelia Barden	Collingwood	23 years, 292 days	1	14	3	Pick 59, 2016 AFL Women's draft
Caitlyn Edwards	Collingwood	20 years, 221 days	1	14	6	Pick 43, 2016 AFL Women's draft
Jasmine Garner	Collingwood	22 years, 39 days	1	14	10	Pick 86, 2016 AFL Women's draft
Emma King	Collingwood	22 years, 220 days	1	14	1	2016 marquee signing
Christina Bernardi	Collingwood	26 years, 241 days	1	13	11	
Jess Cameron	Collingwood	27 years, 221 days	1	13	7	Now known as Jess Duffin.
Moana Hope	Collingwood	27 years, 196 days	1	13	15	
Meg Hutchins	Collingwood	35 years, 0 days	1	12	3	
Tara Morgan	Collingwood	27 years, 263 days	1	11	0	
Lauren Tesoriero	Collingwood	30 years, 146 days	1	11	1	
Bree White	Collingwood	35 years, 47 days	1	11	1	
Alicia Eva	Collingwood	25 years, 365 days	1	7	3	
Nicola Stevens	Collingwood	23 years, 316 days	1	7	0	
Lou Wotton	Collingwood	33 years, 95 days	2	3	0	
Penny Cula-Reid	Collingwood	29 years, 9 days	2	2	0	
Georgia Walker	Collingwood	18 years, 66 days	2	2	0	
Helen Roden	Collingwood	30 years, 314 days	1	1	0	
Kate Sheahan	Collingwood	35 years, 47 days	4	1	0	Daughter of Mike Sheahan.
Hayley Miller	Fremantle	21 years, 1 day	1	87	31	
Gabby O'Sullivan	Fremantle	22 years, 320 days	1	82	29	
Ebony Antonio	Fremantle	25 years, 48 days	1	70	38	Married to Kara Antonio.
Kara Donnellan	Fremantle	24 years, 343 days	1	47	16	Now known as Kara Antonio; married to Ebony Antonio.
Gemma Houghton	Fremantle	23 years, 35 days	1	46	40	
Stephanie Cain	Fremantle	20 years, 245 days	1	44	4	
Ashley Sharp	Fremantle	19 years, 238 days	1	34	25	
Tiah Haynes	Fremantle	23 years, 255 days	1	24	1	
Dana Hooker	Fremantle	26 years, 12 days	1	22	6	
Melissa Caulfield	Fremantle	28 years, 251 days	1	20	5	
Tayla Bresland	Fremantle	21 years, 0 days	1	17	1	
Cassie Davidson	Fremantle	20 years, 121 days	1	14	0	
Lara Filocamo	Fremantle	26 years, 142 days	1	14	2	
Alicia Janz	Fremantle	26 years, 277 days	4	14	0	
Amy Lavell	Fremantle	29 years, 350 days	1	14	8	
Stacey Barr	Fremantle	24 years, 84 days	1	12	5	
Belinda Smith	Fremantle	21 years, 248 days	1	12	0	
Kirby Bentley	Fremantle	30 years, 271 days	1	7	1	
Demi Okely	Fremantle	19 years, 322 days	1	7	0	
Akec Makur Chuot	Fremantle	24 years, 152 days	1	6	0	
Kelly Clinch	Fremantle	33 years, 59 days	2	6	0	
Kira Phillips	Fremantle	21 years, 278 days	3	5	2	
Taylah Angel	Fremantle	25 years, 20 days	1	4	0	
Tarnica Golisano	Fremantle	20 years, 136 days	1	4	1	
Brooke Whyte	Fremantle	27 years, 1 day	4	4	0	
Brianna Green	Fremantle	20 years, 76 days	1	3	0	
Beatrice Devlyn	Fremantle	19 years, 18 days	4	2	0	
Kim Mickle	Fremantle	32 years, 46 days	2	1	0	2014 Commonwealth Games Javelin Gold Medallist.
Rebecca Beeson	Greater Western Sydney	19 years, 350 days	1	68	13	
Nicola Barr	Greater Western Sydney	20 years, 236 days	1	61	10	Pick 1, 2016 AFL Women's draft.
Erin McKinnon	Greater Western Sydney	18 years, 51 days	1	41	1	
Jessica Dal Pos	Greater Western Sydney	23 years, 137 days	1	37	5	
Louise Stephenson	Greater Western Sydney	21 years, 237 days	5	33	4	
Britt Tully	Greater Western Sydney	23 years, 277 days	1	29	4	
Jacinda Barclay	Greater Western Sydney	25 years, 352 days	1	23	11	
Aimee Schmidt	Greater Western Sydney	23 years, 294 days	1	23	10	
Amanda Farrugia	Greater Western Sydney	32 years, 11 days	1	21	2	
Ellie Brush	Greater Western Sydney	28 years, 176 days	2	20	1	
Maddy Collier	Greater Western Sydney	21 years, 143 days	1	15	0	
Phoebe McWilliams	Greater Western Sydney	31 years, 157 days	1	14	14	
Emma Swanson	Greater Western Sydney	21 years, 357 days	3	13	0	
Renee Tomkins	Greater Western Sydney	30 years, 293 days	1	12	0	
Jessica Bibby	Greater Western Sydney	37 years, 165 days	1	7	0	
Ashleigh Guest	Greater Western Sydney	26 years, 300 days	1	7	0	
Clare Lawton	Greater Western Sydney	23 years, 64 days	1	7	0	
Ella Ross	Greater Western Sydney	24 years, 218 days	1	7	0	
Alex Williams	Greater Western Sydney	23 years, 290 days	1	7	0	
Kristy De Pellegrini	Greater Western Sydney	26 years, 272 days	1	6	0	
Alex Saundry	Greater Western Sydney	24 years, 211 days	1	4	0	
Kate Stanton	Greater Western Sydney	18 years, 119 days	1	4	1	
Hannah Wallett	Greater Western Sydney	26 years, 76 days	1	4	1	
Codie Briggs	Greater Western Sydney	21 years, 143 days	1	3	0	
Hannah Dunn	Greater Western Sydney	25 years, 170 days	1	1	0	
Mai Nguyen	Greater Western Sydney	26 years, 240 days	2	3	1	
Stephanie Walker	Greater Western Sydney	22 years, 349 days	2	3	1	
Isabella Rudolph	Greater Western Sydney	21 years, 331 days	7	1	0	
Karen Paxman	Melbourne	28 years, 72 days	1	84	28	
Lily Mithen	Melbourne	18 years, 340 days	1	82	8	
Lauren Pearce	Melbourne	24 years, 24 days	1	79	11	
Sarah Lampard	Melbourne	19 years, 213 days	1	72	6	
Daisy Pearce	Melbourne	28 years, 254 days	1	55	25	
Shelley Scott	Melbourne	28 years, 326 days	1	49	26	
Elise O'Dea	Melbourne	25 years, 154 days	1	28	6	
Harriet Cordner	Melbourne	24 years, 198 days	1	25	1	Granddaughter of Don Cordner.
Aliesha Newman	Melbourne	21 years, 142 days	1	25	11	
Meg Downie	Melbourne	28 years, 33 days	1	22	0	
Katherine Smith	Melbourne	18 years, 130 days	1	21	2	
Cat Phillips	Melbourne	25 years, 115 days	1	20	6	
Richelle Cranston	Melbourne	27 years, 133 days	1	13	6	
Jasmine Grierson	Melbourne	18 years, 265 days	1	13	1	
Melissa Hickey	Melbourne	32 years, 49 days	1	13	2	
Laura Duryea	Melbourne	33 years, 53 days	1	11	0	
Brooke Patterson	Melbourne	27 years, 123 days	2	11	0	
Emma Humphries	Melbourne	21 years, 193 days	1	10	1	
Ainslie Kemp	Melbourne	19 years, 344 days	4	10	0	
Alyssa Mifsud	Melbourne	22 years, 45 days	1	9	10	
Deanna Berry	Melbourne	18 years, 274 days	1	7	5	
Maddie Boyd	Melbourne	23 years, 322 days	1	7	0	
Mia-Rae Clifford	Melbourne	30 years, 179 days	1	7	0	
Jessica Anderson	Melbourne	19 years, 81 days	1	5	1	
Sarah Jolly	Melbourne	25 years, 10 days	2	3	1	
Elise Strachan	Melbourne	25 years, 320 days	6	1	0	
Ellie Blackburn	Western Bulldogs	22 years, 48 days	1	78	35	
Kirsty Lamb	Western Bulldogs	22 years, 222 days	1	67	25	
Bailey Hunt	Western Bulldogs	20 years, 353 days	1	44	1	
Kirsten McLeod	Western Bulldogs	22 years, 250 days	1	39	25	
Brooke Lochland	Western Bulldogs	25 years, 277 days	1	35	18	
Hannah Scott	Western Bulldogs	26 years, 177 days	1	32	2	
Angelica Gogos	Western Bulldogs	27 years, 154 days	1	28	1	
Lauren Spark	Western Bulldogs	31 years, 77 days	1	28	0	
Nicole Callinan	Western Bulldogs	34 years, 50 days	1	24	1	
Ellyse Gamble	Western Bulldogs	19 years, 050 days	1	24	0	
Libby Birch	Western Bulldogs	19 years, 63 days	1	22	1	
Tiarna Ernst	Western Bulldogs	29 years, 11 days	1	22	0	
Emma Kearney	Western Bulldogs	27 years, 133	1	15	3	
Hayley Wildes	Western Bulldogs	20 years, 147 days	1	15	1	
Katie Brennan	Western Bulldogs	24 years, 125 days	1	13	15	
Aasta O'Connor	Western Bulldogs	29 years, 228 days	1	12	3	
Laura Bailey	Western Bulldogs	24 years, 169 days	1	8	1	
Kate Tyndall	Western Bulldogs	33 years, 54 days	1	7	0	
Jaimee Lambert	Western Bulldogs	22 years, 211 days	1	7	5	
Courtney Clarkson	Western Bulldogs	25 years, 163 days	2	6	1	
Lisa Williams	Western Bulldogs	25 years, 277 days	1	6	1	
Jess Gardner	Western Bulldogs	31 years, 252 days	1	5	1	
Rebecca Neaves	Western Bulldogs	19 years,199 days	1	5	0	
Kimberley Ebb	Western Bulldogs	29 years, 318 days	3	4	0	
Meg McDonald	Western Bulldogs	25 years, 251 days	4	4	1	
Romy Timmins	Western Bulldogs	27 years, 295 days	2	2	0	
Lauren Morecroft	Western Bulldogs	29 years, 297 days	4	2	0	
