= 2021 AFL Women's Grand Final =

2021 Grand final game in the AFL Women's league

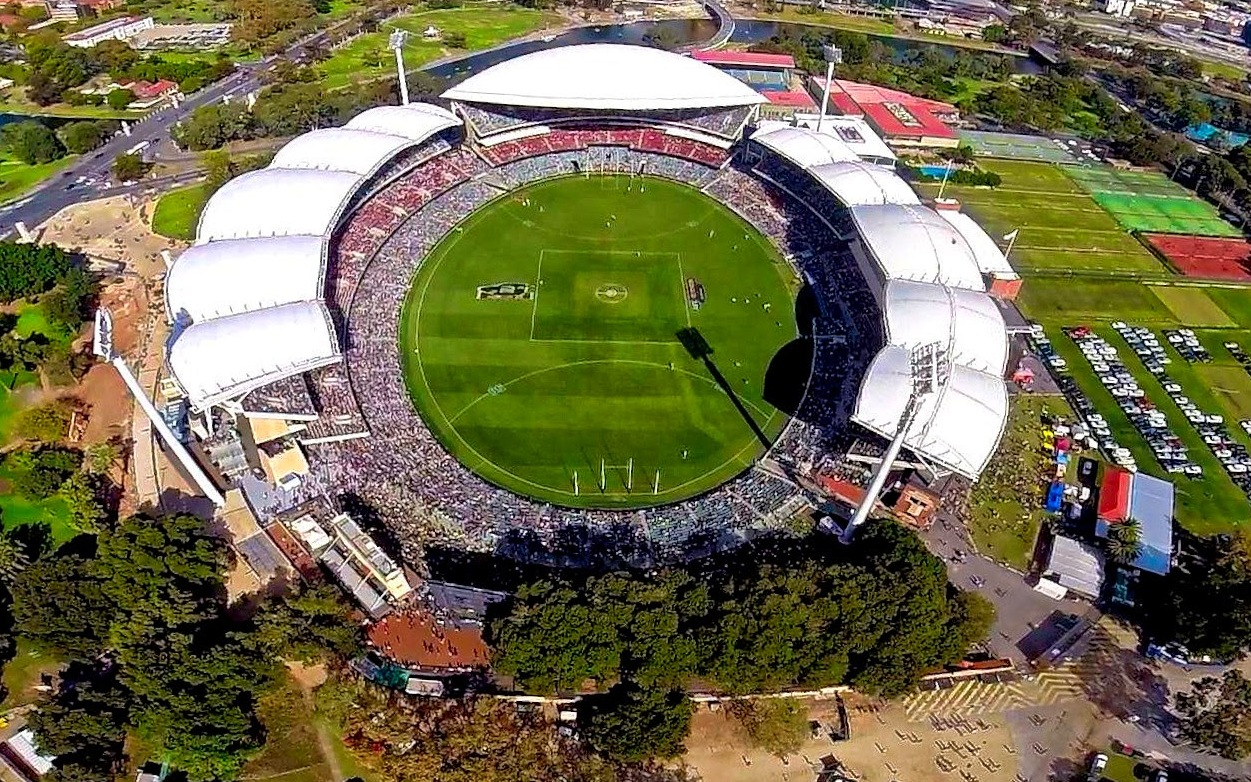
- Adelaide Oval, venue for the 2021 AFL Women's Grand Final, as seen in 2014

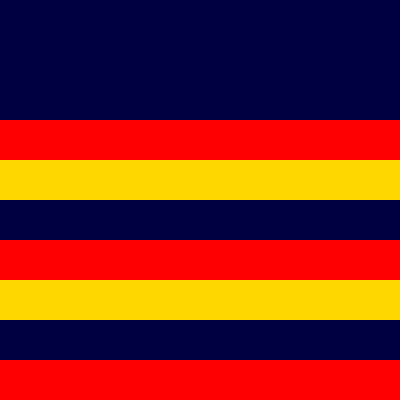

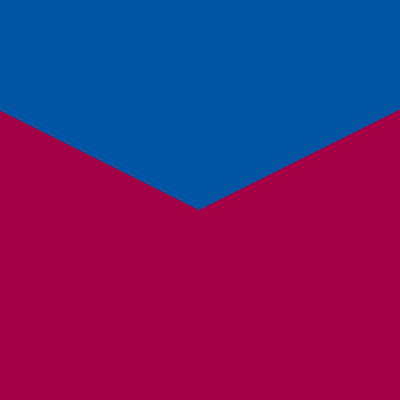
Adelaide	Brisbane
3.2 (20)	6.2 (38)
	1	2	3	4
ADE	1.0 (6)	2.1 (13)	2.2 (14)	3.2 (20)
BRI	1.0 (6)	3.0 (18)	6.0 (36)	6.2 (38)
- Date: 17 April 2021
- Stadium: Adelaide Oval
- Attendance: 22,934
- Umpires: Nicholas McGinness, Michael Pell, Nathan Toner
- Coin toss won by: Brisbane
- Kicked toward: Hill end

Ceremonies
- National anthem: Chloe Bremner

Broadcast in Australia
- Network: Seven Network
- Commentators: Jason Bennett, Nigel Carmody, Abbey Holmes, Mark Soderstrom, Sam Lane

The 2021 AFL Women's Grand Final was an Australian rules football match held at the Adelaide Oval on 17 April to determine the premiers of the fifth season of the AFL Women's (AFLW) competition. The match was contested by the Adelaide Crows and Brisbane Lions. It was the second grand final between the two clubs after the 2017 Grand Final which was won by Adelaide. Both clubs were appearing in their third grand final, following Adelaide's premierships in 2017 and 2019, and Brisbane's losses in the 2017 and 2018 grand finals.

The match was won by Brisbane, who defeated Adelaide by 18 points and claimed their first senior women's premiership. It was the first AFLW grand final since 2019, as there was no grand final match staged during the 2020 season following the cancellation of the latter stage of the season due to the COVID-19 pandemic.

== Background ==
Adelaide and Brisbane entered the 2021 season after disappointing performances in the previous season. Adelaide failed to qualify for the finals series, which was expanded to eight clubs and brought two weeks forward during the early stages of the COVID-19 pandemic, before ultimately being abandoned after the first week of matches. Brisbane did qualify for the series, though were eliminated in the opening week of semi-finals following a comprehensive defeat to Carlton. Despite their relatively poor finishes in 2020, both clubs were rated strong chances to compete for the AFLW premiership in 2021. This season marked the return of the traditional single ladder to rank the fourteen teams, after the previous two seasons were formatted via conferences.

Adelaide finished the home-and-away season in 2021 with seven wins and two losses and claimed the minor premiership on percentage over three other teams. Due to finishing inside the top two on the ladder, the Crows earned the week off from the qualifying finals and proceeded direct to a home preliminary final at the Adelaide Oval against Melbourne. Against an inaccurate Melbourne side, Adelaide led comfortably after the mid-way point of the match and finished 18-point winners over the Demons. The victory was soured by a concussion sustained by Adelaide captain Chelsea Randall in the first quarter of the match. Under the AFL's concussion protocols, any player ruled out of a match with concussion was required to not play for a further 12 days, meaning Randall was not eligible to play in the grand final.

Like Adelaide, Brisbane entered the 2021 finals series with a record of seven wins and two losses. They finished the home-and-away season in second position, beneath Adelaide but ahead of Collingwood and Melbourne on percentage. The Lions thus earned a home preliminary final at the Gabba, which was held against Collingwood after the Magpies defeated North Melbourne in the qualifying final. The match was a see-sawing and very close contest, with the margin never exceeding more than two-and-a-half goals. Collingwood kicked the first two goals and led at quarter time, before the Lions responded with goals of their own to lead at half time. Trailing by two points at the end of the third quarter, Brisbane opened up a 10-point lead with two goals in quick succession in the last quarter. Collingwood scored a goal with under half-a-minute remaining in the match, but Brisbane held on for a narrow victory and qualified for their third AFL Women's grand final. Brisbane forward Dakota Davidson was the most influential player in the game, kicking three goals, which included one in the last quarter.

== Venue and date ==
On 7 April 2021, shortly after the finals series commenced, the AFL announced that the grand final would be held on 17 April. It also revealed the three potential venues it had booked to host it: Adelaide Oval, the Gabba and the Melbourne Cricket Ground. The ultimate venue would be determined by the results of the preliminary finals. Following Adelaide's 18-point win over Melbourne in the first preliminary final, the Crows qualified for a home grand final at the Adelaide Oval. It was the oval's second AFLW grand final, after hosting a sell-out crowd of more than 53,000 people for the Adelaide-Carlton grand final in 2019. The match commenced at 1:30 pm local time in Adelaide, which was 2:00 pm Australian Eastern Standard Time (AEST). Tickets were priced at $10 for adults and free entry for children aged under 18, making it the first AFL Women's grand final to not allow free entry for all spectators. The stadium capacity of the Adelaide Oval was capped at 40,000, roughly 75% of its usual capacity, due to the COVID-19 safety protocols imposed by the South Australian government.

== Entertainment ==
Australian indie-pop artist G Flip was booked by the AFL to perform the pre-match musical entertainment. Actress and musical theatre graduate Chloe Bremner sang the national anthem.

This grand final was the first to feature a sprint running race between several of the league's footballers not competing in the match. The tradition of a grand final sprint commenced in the 1979 VFL Grand Final, and has been staged annually (mostly) in the men's competition since that occasion. Ruby Svarc of the Brisbane Lions won the sprint.

== Media coverage ==
The match was broadcast by the Seven Network and simulcast on Foxtel, Kayo Sports, the afl.com.au and women's.afl websites, and on the AFL and AFLW apps. It was also available on radio nationally via ABC Radio Grandstand.

== Teams ==
The two teams were announced on 16 April 2021. The only change in either side was the forced removal of Adelaide captain Chelsea Randall, who suffered concussion in the preliminary final and was required to not play for 12 days. She was replaced by 2019 premiership player Ailish Considine, who was playing her fourth senior game for the year and had herself been affected by concussion earlier in the season. Ange Foley was appointed captain for the grand final in Randall's absence. The Lions team was unchanged from their preliminary final win against Collingwood. The three field umpires for the match were Nicholas McGinness, Michael Pell and Nathan Toner.

Adelaide
B:	3 Ange Foley (c)	32 Marijana Rajcic	
HB:	8 Najwa Allen	39 Sarah Allan	14 Stevie-Lee Thompson
C:	9 Deni Varnhagen	10 Ebony Marinoff	2 Eloise Jones
HF:	5 Rachelle Martin	15 Danielle Ponter	24 Ashleigh Woodland
F:	1 Caitlin Gould	4 Chloe Scheer	
Foll:	11 Rhiannon Metcalfe	13 Erin Phillips	33 Anne Hatchard
Int:	16 Ailish Considine	6 Hannah Button	23 Justine Mules
Int:	25 Teah Charlton	31 Dayna Cox	
Coach:	Matthew Clarke		

Brisbane
B:	8 Emma Zielke (c)	20 Shannon Campbell	
HB:	13 Kate Lutkins	10 Nat Grider	3 Breanna Koenen
C:	9 Orla O'Dwyer	25 Cathy Svarc	12 Sophie Conway
HF:	15 Greta Bodey	14 Dakota Davidson	16 Lauren Arnell
F:	30 Jesse Wardlaw	21 Courtney Hodder	
Foll:	24 Tahlia Hickie	18 Ally Anderson	1 Emily Bates
Int:	26 Indy Tahau	5 Jade Ellenger	17 Belle Dawes
Int:	23 Jess Wuetschner	31 Taylor Smith	
Coach:	Craig Starcevich		

== Match summary ==
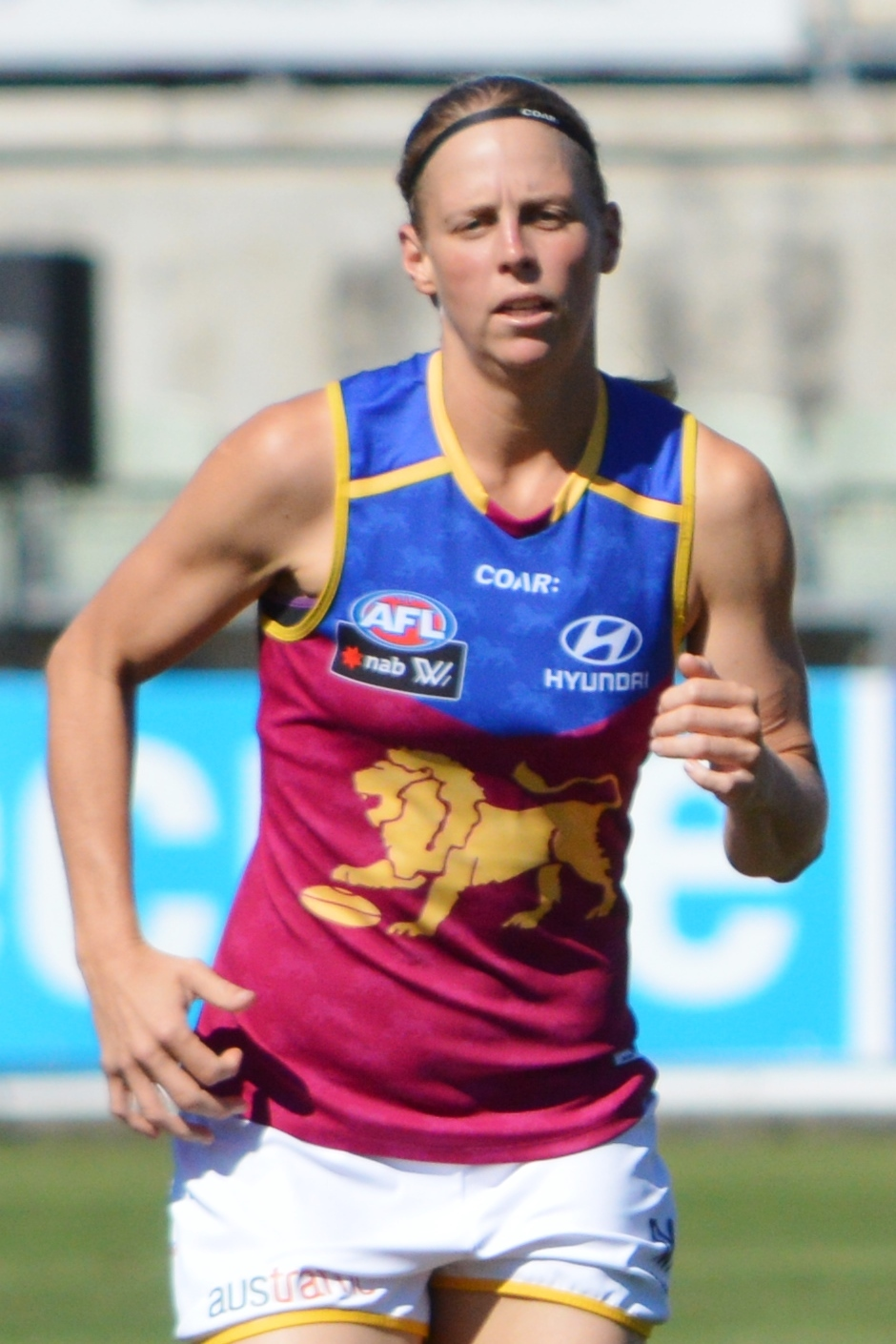
Brisbane defender Kate Lutkins was named best on ground

The Lions scored with an opening goal, with Courtney Hodder kicking a snap shot from the pocket despite being sandwiched between Adelaide defenders Najwa Allen and Marijana Rajcic. The Lions' Cathy Svarc had the job of tagging the Crows' Ebony Marinoff, and managed to keep her to four disposals in the first quarter. The Lions as a team exerted great tacking pressing, running up 16 tackles to the Crows' 7 for the quarter. Marinoff would finish the day with just 16 possessions. The Lions defence came under great pressure. Stevie-Lee Thompson managed to score an equalising goal. To do so she had to gather a loose ball, break through a tackle and bounce one through.

An early goal in the second quarter by Danielle Ponter with an assist by Eloise Jones briefly gave Adelaide the lead, but Hodder hit back with an extraordinary goal from a tight angle in the pocket while cornered by defenders. Brisbane managed to keep Erin Phillips quiet as well, with only four possessions in the first half, but she had a shot at goal that missed, scoring a behind. With only seconds to go in the first half, Jess Wuetschner managed to kick another goal from long range. The Brisbane back line, consisting of Kate Lutkins, Breanna Koenen and Shannon Campbell, were superb in defence, holding up under enormous pressure. Although Adelaide had 21 inside-50s in the first half, they could not capitalise, and managed only two goals in the first half. In contrast, Brisbane kicked three from just ten entries to lead by five points at half time.

Both teams lost their captains in the third quarter. Emma Zielke suffered a hamstring injury early in the third quarter, leaving her on the bench in tears. She would announce her retirement after the game. Moments later, Ange Foley also went down, injuring her knee in an awkward fall. Brisbane's lead was extended when Wuetschner kicked a second goal from 50 metres out that bounced through. Things started to look grim for the Crows when Lauren Arnell managed to get her toe on a long bomb from Cathy Svarc just soon enough to score another major. Like Zielke, Arnell had been playing since the competition began in 2017, and would retire after the game. Isabel Dawes scored one more goal for the Lions before the siren, leaving Brisbane with a 22-point lead at the final change.

At three quarter time, with Foley out of action, the Crows turned to their old captain, Chelsea Randall. Not being a player, she could not go on to the field, so the team gathered around her on the sideline. The final quarter opened as they hoped, with Eloise Jones taking a mark for a shot at goal, then being given a 50-metre penalty that made it a certainty. However, the Lions' defence continued to hold up, and the Crows were unable to score another, leaving Brisbane the winners.

=== Best on Ground Medal ===
Brisbane defender Kate Lutkins was awarded the medal for the best player on the ground. She finished with 18 disposals, seven of them contested, and had ten rebound 50s. She played in pain, and was scheduled to have surgery on both feet, having torn the plantar fascia in her left foot during round eight.

Best on Ground Medal Voting Tally
Position	Player	Club	Total votes	Vote summary
1st (winner)	Kate Lutkins	Brisbane Lions	12	3, 3, 3, 3
2nd	Ally Anderson	Brisbane Lions	9	3, 2, 2, 2
3rd	Emily Bates	Brisbane Lions	5	2, 1, 1, 1
4th - tied	Breanna Koenen	Brisbane Lions	2	2
4th - tied	Stevie-Lee Thompson	Adelaide Crows	2	1, 1

Voter	3 Votes	2 Votes	1 Vote
Josh Vanderloo (chair)	Kate Lutkins	Ally Anderson	Emily Bates
Sarah Black	Kate Lutkins	Ally Anderson	Stevie-Lee Thompson
Courtney Cramey	Ally Anderson	Emily Bates	Stevie-Lee Thompson
Chyloe Kurdas	Kate Lutkins	Breanna Koenen	Emily Bates
Debbie Lee	Kate Lutkins	Ally Anderson	Emily Bates

== Scorecard ==
2021 AFL Women's Grand Final
Saturday, 17 April (1:30 p.m.)	Adelaide	def. by	Brisbane	Adelaide Oval (crowd: 22,934)
1.0 (6); 2.1 (13); 2.2 (14); 3.2 (20)	Q1; Q2; Q3; Final	1.0 (6); 3.0 (18); 6.0 (36); 6.2 (38)	Umpires: McGinness, Pell, Toner; Best on ground: Kate Lutkins; Television broadcast: Seven Network; National anthem: Chloe Bremner
Ponter, Thompson, Jones 1	Goals	2 Hodder, Wuetschner; 1 Arnell, Dawes
Thompson, Hatchard, Considine, Marinoff, Allan	Best	Lutkins, Anderson, C Svarc, Koenen, Bates, O'Dwyer
Foley (knee)	Injuries	Zielke (hamstring)

== See also ==
- AFL Women's Grand Final
- 2021 AFL Grand Final
