= Ange Foley =

Australian rules footballer (born 1988)

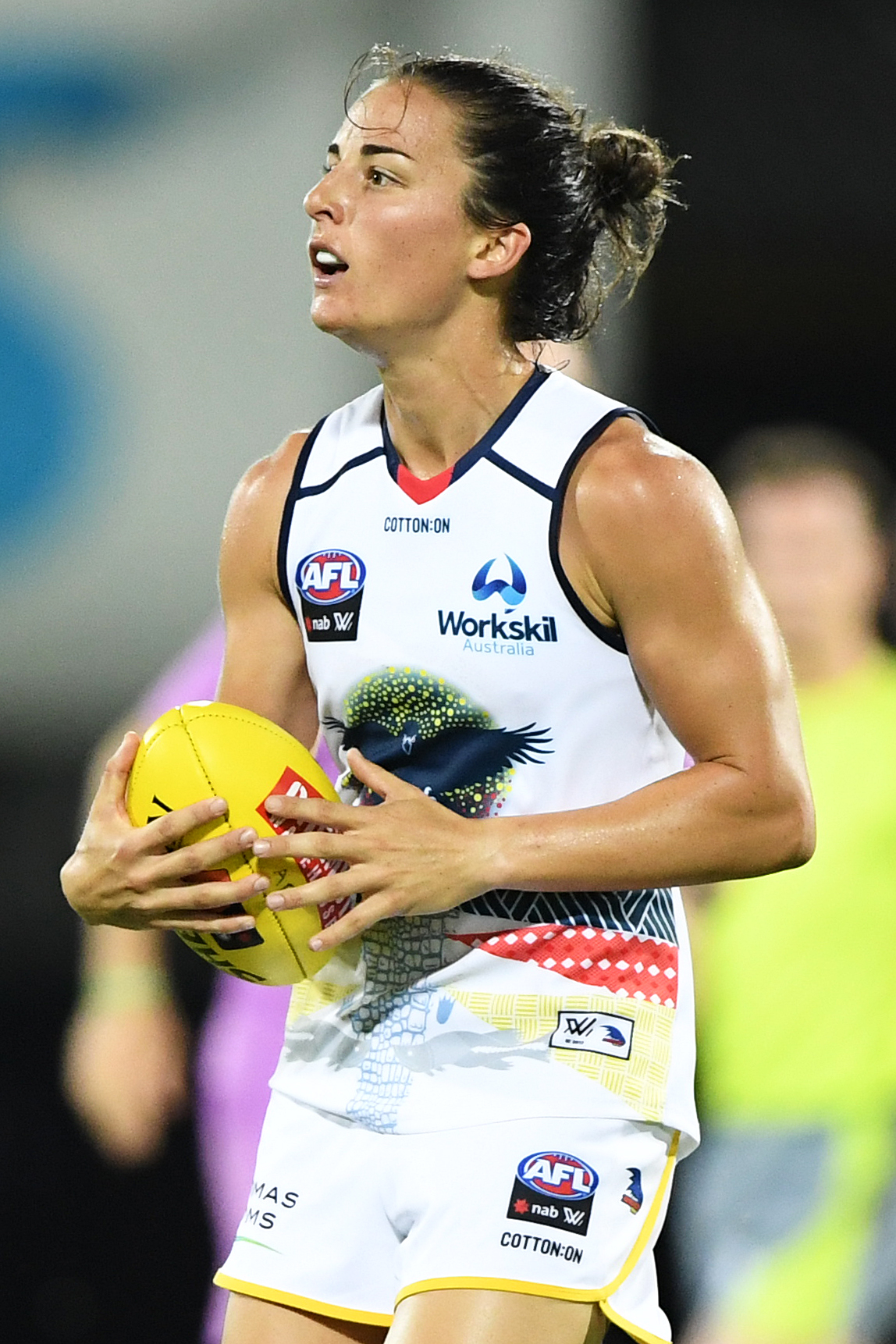
- Foley during a pre-season practice match for Adelaide in 2019

Personal information
- Full name: Angela Foley
- Born: 13 December 1988 (age 37); Shepparton, Victoria
- Original team: Waratah (NTFL)
- Draft: 2016 priority selection
- Debut: Round 1, 2017, Adelaide vs. Greater Western Sydney, at Thebarton Oval
- Height: 173 cm (5 ft 8 in)
- Position: Defender / midfielder

Playing career^{1}
Years	Club	Games (Goals)
2017–2022 (S6)	Adelaide	40 (2)
2022 (S7)–2024	Port Adelaide	33 (4)
Total		73 (6)
- ^{1} Playing statistics correct to the end of the 2024 season.

Career highlights
- 2× AFL Women's premiership player: 2017, 2019

Angela Foley (born 13 December 1988) is a former Australian rules footballer who last played for the Port Adelaide Football Club in the AFL Women's (AFLW). She previously played for the Adelaide Football Club from 2017 to season 6. A defender, 1.73 metres (5.7 ft) tall, Foley plays primarily on the half-back line with the ability to push into the midfield.

After spending her early life in country Victoria, in which she won a premiership and best and fairest with Bendigo Thunder, she moved to Darwin in 2013. Her career in the Northern Territory saw her win three consecutive premierships, two consecutive league best and fairests, a grand final best on ground medal, and interstate representation.

Foley's performances in representative matches in 2016 saw her recruited by the Adelaide Football Club as a priority selection for the inaugural AFLW season. She is a dual AFL Women's premiership player.

== Early life ==
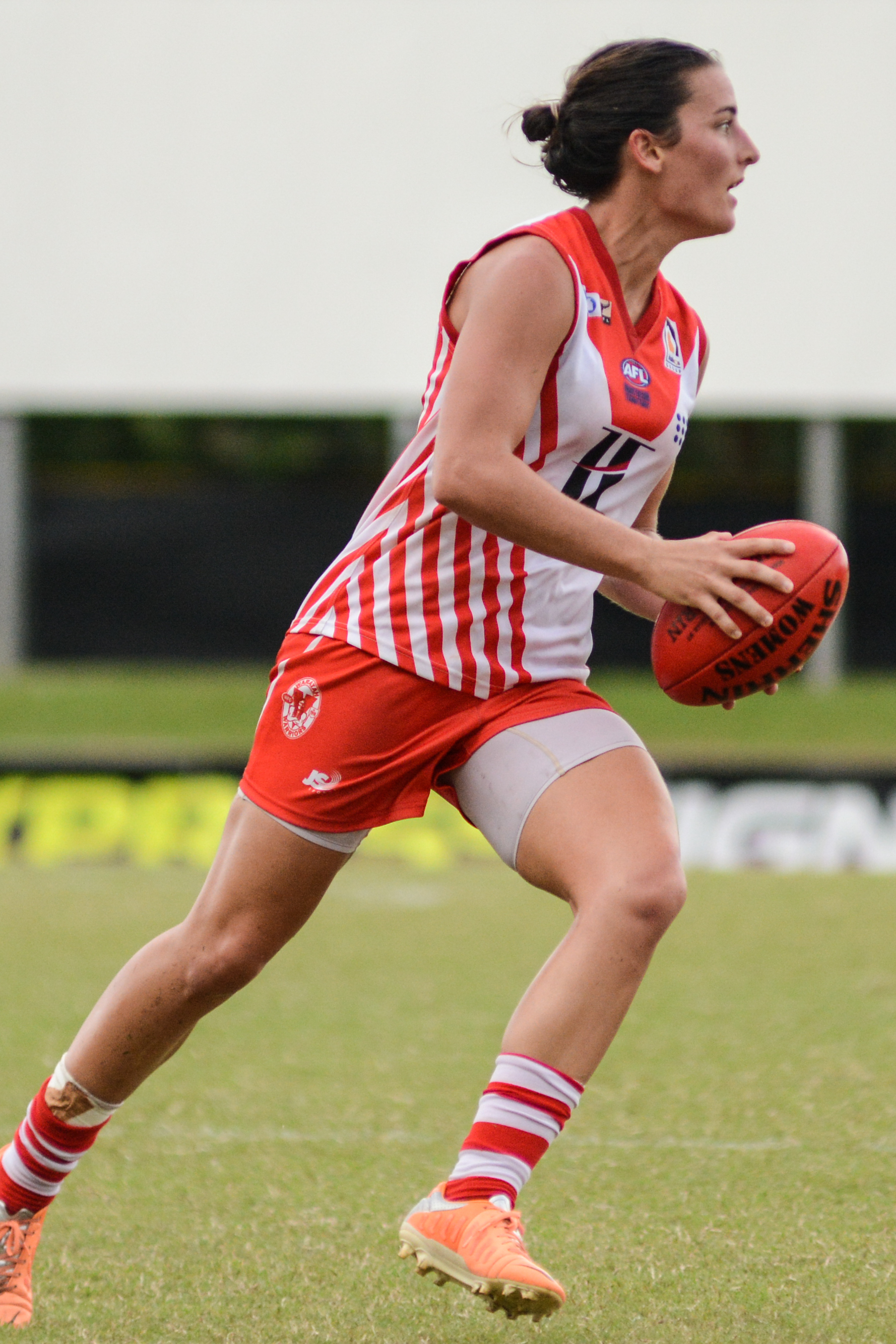
Foley playing for Waratah in the 2014/15 NTFL Women's Grand Final

Foley was born and raised in Shepparton, Victoria. She played with the Bendigo Thunder in the Victorian Women's Football League north west conference, winning the club's inaugural best and fairest medal in 2011 and a premiership in the 2012 season. She moved to Darwin at the start of 2013 and joined the Waratah Football Club in the Northern Territory Football League (NTFL), winning the premiership in her first season with the club and the Brenda Williams Medal as the best on ground in the grand final. She won a further two premierships with the club in the 2014/15 and 2015/16 seasons and was also announced the league's most valuable women's player for both seasons.

Foley represented the Northern Territory for the first time in 2015 when the territory faced South Australia in May. She was selected as part of the inaugural NT Thunder talent program in 2016 and represented the territory in April against Victoria and Tasmania. She was selected by the Melbourne Football Club for an exhibition match against the Brisbane Lions at the Melbourne Cricket Ground in May, with the NT News reporter, Marc McGowan, stating her two matches against Victoria and Tasmania were key to her selection for Melbourne. In June, she represented the Northern Territory against South Australia in a curtain raiser before the AFL Adelaide versus St Kilda match at Adelaide Oval. Her representative performances throughout the year saw her selected for Melbourne in the all-stars match against the Western Bulldogs in September at Whitten Oval, in which she kicked a goal and was named one of Melbourne's best players.

Foley also played two seasons in the premier netball competition in Darwin for the Hoggies, but elected to give up the sport from the 2016 season to focus on her football career.

== AFL Women's career ==
=== Adelaide (2017–2022) ===
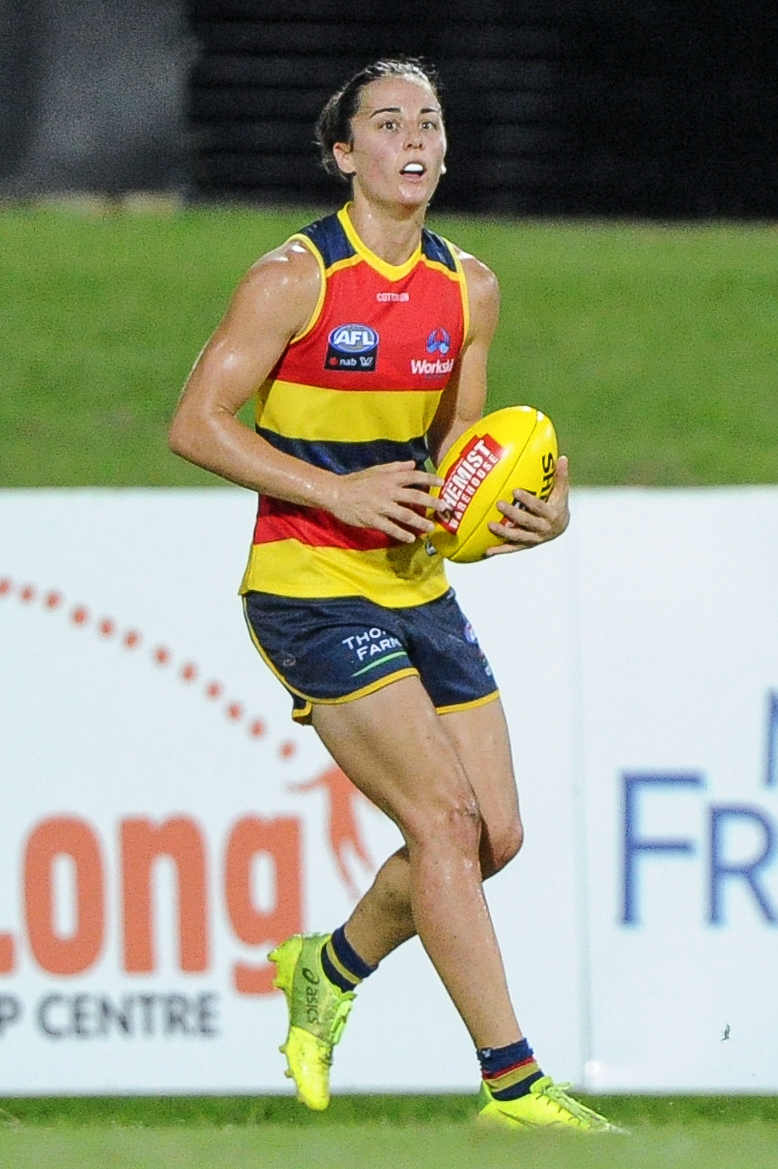
Foley during a pre-season practice match for Adelaide in 2018

Foley was recruited by the Adelaide Football Club as a priority selection in August 2016. She was named as Adelaide's inaugural co-vice-captain alongside Sally Riley in January 2017. She made her debut in the thirty-six point win against Greater Western Sydney at Thebarton Oval in the opening round of the 2017 season. Her performance in the three point win against Carlton at Thebarton Oval in round three drew praise due to her limiting the impact of the league leading goalkicker, Darcy Vescio–keeping her to zero disposals after halftime–with the Australian Associated Press reporter, Ben McKay, writing she effectively shut down the dangerous forward. After the club finished second on the ladder, she was a part of Adelaide's premiership side after the club defeated Brisbane by six points at Metricon Stadium in the AFL Women's Grand Final. She played every match in her debut season to finish with eight matches and finished equal fifth in the Adelaide Club Champion award with 81 votes alongside Rhiannon Metcalfe.

After re-signing with Adelaide for the 2018 season, she was named one of Adelaide's vice-captains for the second consecutive season with Sally Riley. She played the opening two matches of the season before she was suspended for one match due to kneeing Daisy Pearce in the thirty-two point loss to Melbourne at Casey Fields. In her return match, the draw against Greater Western Sydney at Blacktown International Sportspark in round four, she recorded twenty disposals, six marks and three tackles, with Shepparton News journalist, Tyler Maher, writing she returned from suspension with a bang. In the four point win against Fremantle at TIO Stadium in round six, she was the acting captain for the match and despite regular captains Erin Phillips and Chelsea Randall playing in the match, the club elected to give Foley the captaincy in front of her home crowd. For her performance in the match, in which she recorded fifteen disposals, six tackles and four marks, she was named in AFL Media's team of the week and received two league best and fairest votes, meaning she was adjudged the second best player on the ground by the field umpires. Her performances throughout the season saw her named in the initial forty player All-Australian squad and she finished fourth in Adelaide's Club Champion award with 106 votes.

In 2021, Foley was named as the stand-in captain of Adelaide's 2021 AFL Women's Grand Final team, after long-time captain Chelsea Randall was ruled out from the game due to concussion.

=== Port Adelaide (2022–present) ===
In April 2022, Foley announced her intention to sign with Port Adelaide's inaugural AFLW team, officially signing with the club on the opening day of the expansion signing period in May.

In 2024, Foley was named among Port Adelaide's best players in its loss to North Melbourne in week 4.

== Statistics ==
Updated to the end of the 2024 season.

Legend
G	Goals	K	Kicks	D	Disposals	T	Tackles
B	Behinds	H	Handballs	M	Marks
#	Played in that season's premiership team

Season	Team	No.	Games	Totals							Averages (per game)							Votes
Season	Team	No.	Games	G	B	K	H	D	M	T	G	B	K	H	D	M	T	Votes
2017^{#}	Adelaide	3	8	1	0	55	22	77	16	15	0.1	0.0	6.9	2.8	9.6	2.0	1.9	0
2018	Adelaide	3	6	0	0	69	11	80	18	21	0.0	0.0	11.5	1.8	13.3	3.0	3.5	2
2019^{#}	Adelaide	3	9	0	0	77	32	109	19	11	0.1	0.0	8.6	3.6	12.1	2.1	1.2	1
2020	Adelaide	3	6	1	0	65	9	74	20	14	0.2	0.0	10.8	1.5	12.3	3.3	2.3	1
2021	Adelaide	3	11	0	0	82	42	124	26	15	0.0	0.0	7.5	3.8	11.3	2.4	1.4	0
2022 (S6)	Adelaide	3	0	—	—	—	—	—	—	—	—	—	—	—	—	—	—	0
2022 (S7)	Port Adelaide	3	10	2	4	109	25	134	29	21	0.2	0.4	10.9	2.5	13.4	2.9	2.1	2
2023	Port Adelaide	3	10	2	0	96	10	106	26	23	0.2	0.0	9.6	1.0	10.6	2.6	2.3	0
2024	Port Adelaide	3	13	0	1	123	15	138	14	23	0.0	0.1	9.5	1.2	10.6	1.1	1.8	0
Career			73	6	5	676	166	842	168	143	0.1	0.1	9.3	2.3	11.5	2.3	2.0	6

== Off-field ==
Outside of her football career, Foley is the director of sport at the Essington School Darwin in Nightcliff, Northern Territory. She also works part time at Brighton Secondary School in Brighton, South Australia.

== Honours and achievements ==
Team

- 2× AFL Women's premiership player (Adelaide): 2017, 2019
- AFL Women's minor premiership (Adelaide): 2021
