= Monique Hollick =

Australian rules footballer (born 1989)

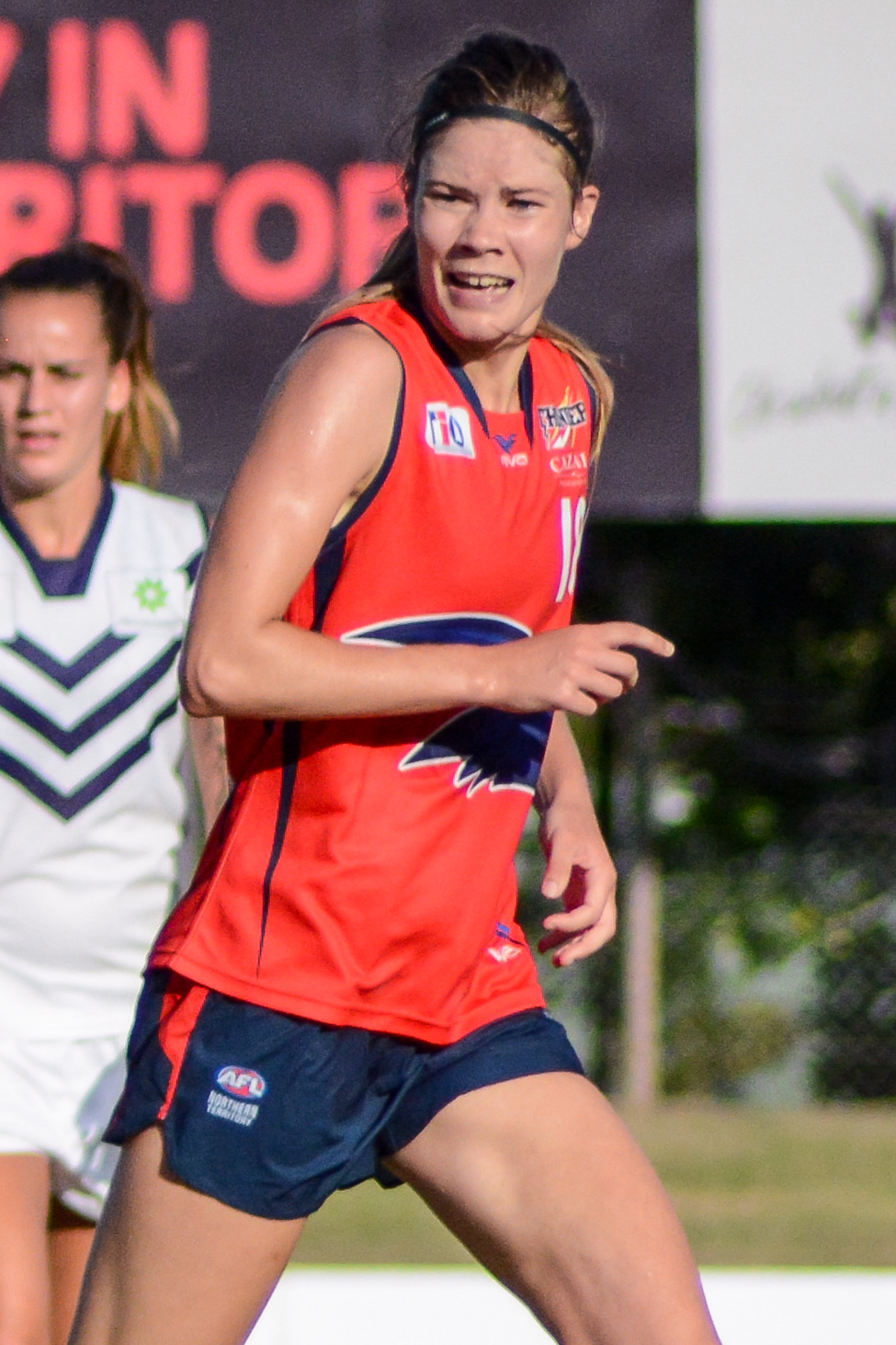
- Hollick in January 2017

Personal information
- Born: 8 December 1989 (age 36)
- Original team: University UNSW (SWAFL)
- Draft: No. 136, 2016 AFL Women's draft
- Debut: Round 1, 2017, Adelaide vs. Greater Western Sydney, at Thebarton Oval
- Height: 179 cm (5 ft 10 in)
- Position: Midfielder

Playing career^{1}
| Years | Club | Games (Goals) |
| 2017 | Adelaide | 3 (0) |
- ^{1} Playing statistics correct to the end of 2017.

Monique Hollick (born 8 December 1989) is an Australian rules footballer who played for the Adelaide Football Club in the AFL Women's competition. She was drafted by Adelaide with their eighteenth selection and 136th overall in the 2016 AFL Women's draft. She made her debut in the thirty-six point win against Greater Western Sydney at Thebarton Oval in the opening round of the 2017 season. She was omitted for the round two match against the Western Bulldogs at VU Whitten Oval, before returning for the round four match against Fremantle at Fremantle Oval. She played the next week before missing the round six match against Melbourne at TIO Stadium due to getting married. She did not return for the remainder of the season and consequently missed the premiership, she finished with three matches in her debut season.
