= Talia Radan =

Australian rules footballer

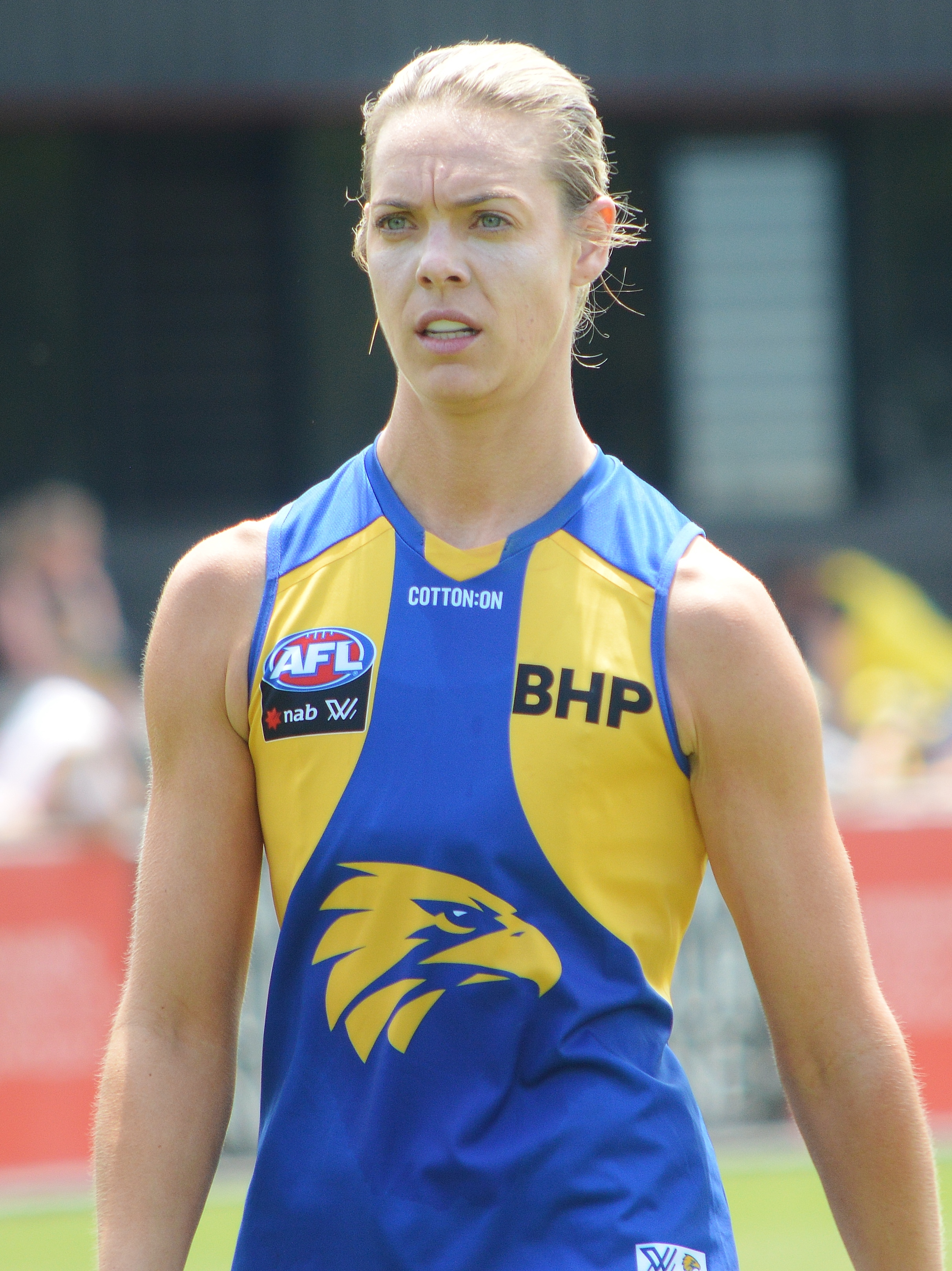
- Radan with West Coast in January 2020

Personal information
- Born: 9 May 1988 (age 38)
- Original team: Belconnen (AFL Canberra)
- Draft: No. 58, 2016 AFL Women's draft
- Debut: Round 1, 2017, Adelaide vs. Greater Western Sydney, at Thebarton Oval
- Height: 179 cm (5 ft 10 in)
- Position: Defender

Playing career^{1}
Years	Club	Games (Goals)
2017–2018	Adelaide	10 (0)
2019	Melbourne	0 (0)
2020	West Coast	6 (0)
Total		16 (0)
- ^{1} Playing statistics correct to the end of the 2020 season.

Career highlights
- AFLW premiership player: 2017

Talia Radan (born 9 May 1988) is a former Australian rules footballer who last played for West Coast in the AFL Women's competition. She was drafted by Adelaide with their eighth selection and fifty-eighth overall in the 2016 AFL Women's draft. She made her debut in the thirty-six point win against Greater Western Sydney at Thebarton Oval in the opening round of the 2017 season. She was a part of Adelaide's premiership side after the club defeated Brisbane by six points at Metricon Stadium in the AFL Women's Grand Final. She played every match in her debut season to finish with eight matches.

Adelaide signed Radan for the 2018 season during the trade period in May 2017.

Ahead of the 2019 season, Radan was traded to Melbourne as part of a 5-way deal, including Christina Bernardi and 12 picks.

Talia studied Law and Social Science at the University of Adelaide before moving to Canberra. Talia did her Graduate Diploma in Legal Practice with the Australian National University before moving to work for the Federal Government.
