= Clare Lawton =

Australian rules footballer (born 1993)

Personal information
- Born: 2 December 1993 (age 32)
- Draft: No. 97, 2016 AFL Women's draft
- Debut: Round 1, 2017, Greater Western Sydney vs. Adelaide, at Thebarton Oval
- Height: 177 cm (5 ft 10 in)
- Position: Utility

Playing career^{1}
Years	Club	Games (Goals)
2017	Greater Western Sydney	7 (0)
- ^{1} Playing statistics correct to the end of 2017.

Clare Lawton (born 2 December 1993) is an Australian rules footballer who played for the Greater Western Sydney Giants in the AFL Women's competition. Lawton was drafted by Greater Western Sydney with their eleventh selection and ninety-seventh overall in the 2016 AFL Women's draft. She made her debut in the thirty-six point loss to Adelaide at Thebarton Oval in the opening round of the 2017 season. She played every match in her debut season to finish with seven games. She was delisted at the end of the 2017 season. In 2018, Lawton played with Wilston Grange in the QWAFL.
