= Georgia Bevan =

Australian rules footballer

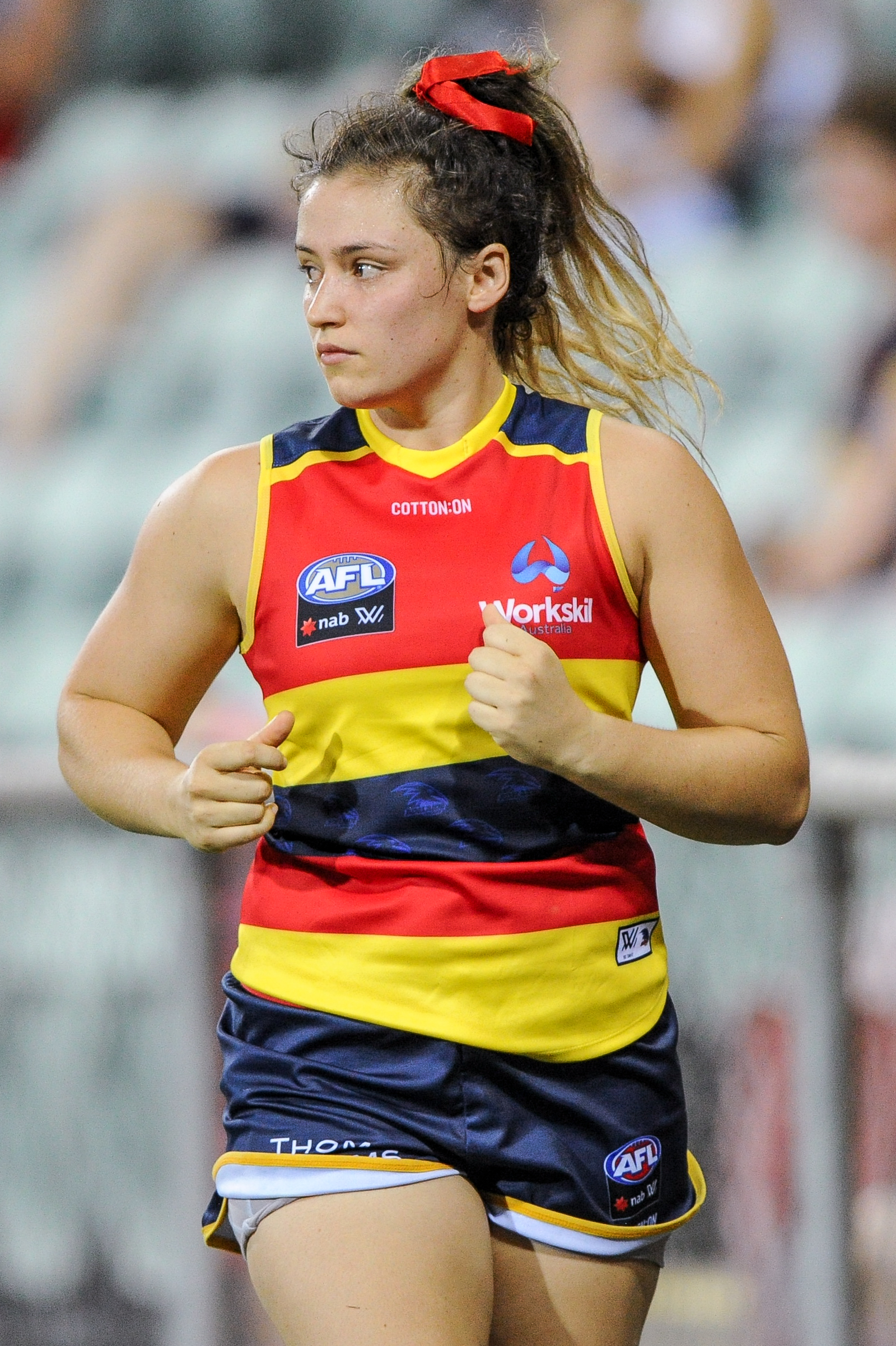
- Bevan playing for Adelaide in January 2018

Personal information
- Born: 11 June 1993 (age 33)
- Original team: Morphettville Park (SAWFL)
- Draft: No. 42, 2016 AFL Women's draft
- Debut: Round 1, 2017, Adelaide vs. Greater Western Sydney, at Thebarton Oval
- Height: 161 cm (5 ft 3 in)
- Position: Midfielder

Playing career^{1}
Years	Club	Games (Goals)
2017–2018	Adelaide	13 (1)
2021	Gold Coast	3 (0)
Total		16 (1)
- ^{1} Playing statistics correct to the end of the 2021 season.

Career highlights
- AFLW premiership player: 2017

Georgia Bevan (born 11 June 1993) is an Australian rules footballer who played for Adelaide and the Gold Coast in the AFL Women's (AFLW) competition. After playing softball as a teenager she changed sports to football. After playing for Morphettville Park Football Club in the South Australian Women's Football League and winning three consecutive premierships with the club, she was drafted by Adelaide in the inaugural AFLW draft and was a member of their premiership winning team in the 2017 AFL Women's Grand Final. In 2021 she was signed as an injury replacement player by the Gold Coast and was delisted at the end of the season.

== Early life ==
Bevan was born into a sporting family. Her mother played softball for Australia and her sister (12 years older) and brother (8 years older) played softball and baseball respectively. Bevan played a number of sports in her childhood, including softball, in which she represented her home state of South Australia multiple times. Bevan also played Australian rules football, and represented South Australia in 2010 at the inaugural women's under-18 national championships. She was selected in the team of the carnival.

Bevan started playing club football in 2013 and in 2014 she was selected to play for a South Australian team. Despite only being 20 years old she was made the vice-captain of the team. She enjoyed success in football in South Australia for Morphettville Park, with whom she won three consecutive premierships in the South Australian Women's Football League (SAWFL) from 2014 to 2016. She also played in the 2016 All Stars Women's Exhibition match and was named best-on-ground.

== AFLW career ==
Bevan was drafted by Adelaide with their sixth selection and forty-second overall in the 2016 AFL Women's draft. She made her debut in the thirty-six point win against Greater Western Sydney at Thebarton Oval in the opening round of the 2017 season. She played one of her best matches of the season in Adelaide's Grand Final win over Brisbane by six points at Metricon Stadium, with 13 disposals, four inside 50s and five tackles as the Crows became the inaugural AFLW premiers. She played every match in her debut season to finish with eight matches.

Adelaide signed Bevan for the 2018 season during the trade period in May, 2017. She was delisted by Adelaide at the end of the 2018 season.

In January 2021, following a couple of seasons playing for Sturt in the SANFL Women's League (SANFLW), Bevan was signed as an injury replacement player by Gold Coast after Jacqui Yorston was placed on the inactive list due to an anterior cruciate ligament injury. At the end of the season, Bevan was delisted by the club after making 3 appearances during the season.

== Player profile ==
Bevan is a ball-winning midfielder who excels at stoppages. She also plays a role linking defence and attack, and in the 2017 AFLW season she was one of the top ten players in the competition for inside 50s. She always wears a red ribbon while playing, making her stand out on the field.

== Personal life ==
Bevan works as a accredited sports dietitian and nutritionist and is also the club president of the Morphettville Park Football Club.
