= Heather Anderson =

Australian rules footballer (1994–2022)

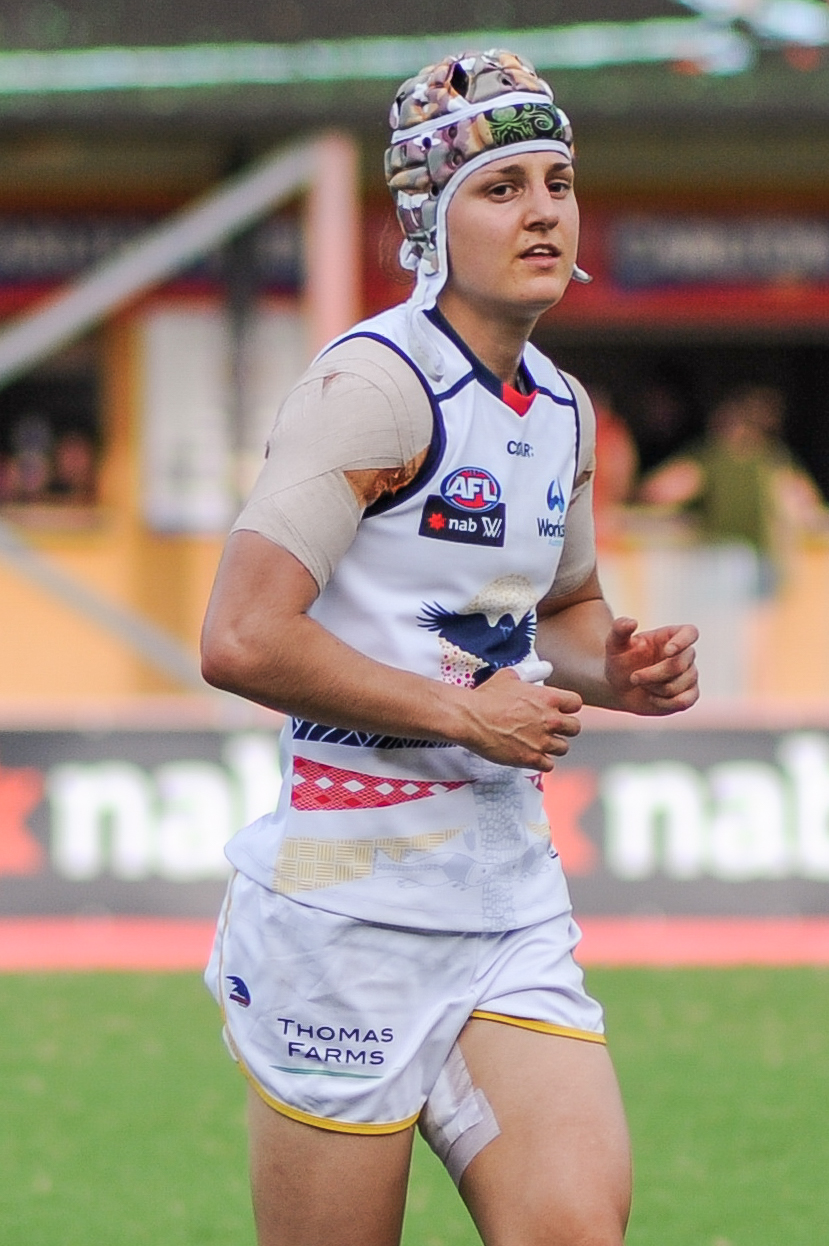

Personal information
- Born: 29 July 1994; Canberra, Australian Capital Territory
- Died: 13 November 2022 (aged 28); Perth, Western Australia
- Original team: Waratah (NTFL) Belconnen Magpies (AFL Canberra)
- Draft: No. 10, 2016 AFL Women's draft
- Debut: Round 1, 2017, Adelaide vs. Greater Western Sydney, at Thebarton Oval
- Height: 168 cm (5 ft 6 in)
- Position: Defender

Playing career^{1}
Years	Club	Games (Goals)
2017	Adelaide	8 (0)
- ^{1} Playing statistics correct to the end of 2017.

Career highlights
- ACT Youth Girls U/18s representative: 2009, 2010, 2011, 2012; ACT/NSW Youth Girls representative: 2010, 2011, 2012; Co-Captain ACT/NSW team at inaugural Youth Girls Nationals (aged 16): 2010; All-Australian Youth Girls National Carnival (aged 16 and 17): 2010 and 2011; ACT Womens Representative (from age 16): 2011, 2013, 2014, 2015; All-Australian 2013 AFL Womens National Carnival, Cairns; ACT/NSW Womens Representative and co-captain: 2015; Rising Star, AFL Canberra Womens Competition (aged 16): 2011; Bainrot Medal, AFL Canberra Womens Best and Fairest (aged 18&19): 2013, 2014; AFLW premiership player: 2017

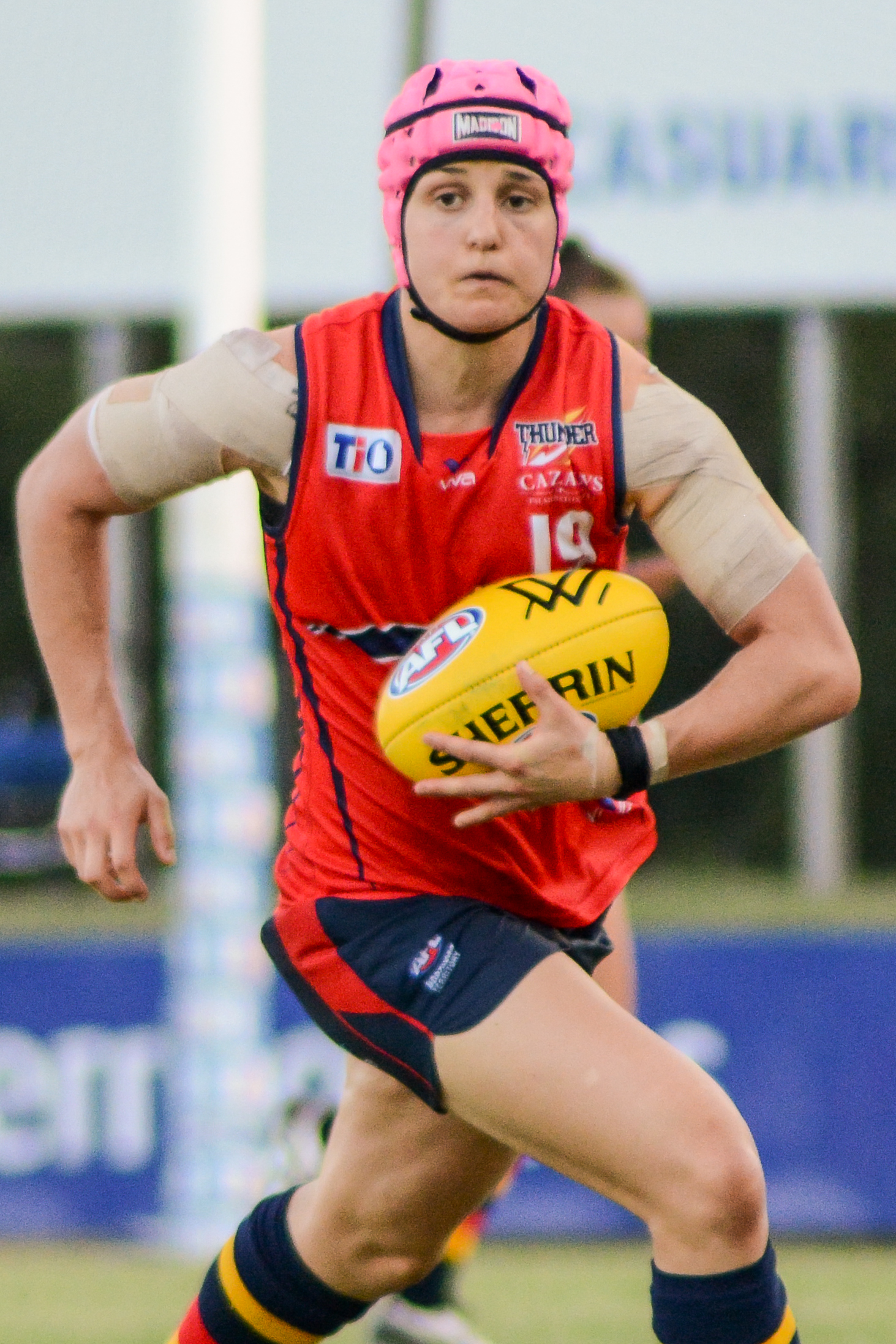
Anderson in 2017

Heather Anderson (29 July 1994 – 13 November 2022) was an Australian Army soldier and Australian rules footballer who played for the Adelaide Football Club in the AFL Women's competition in 2017. She served as a medic in the 1st Close Health Battalion.

== Early Australian Rules career ==
Anderson first played Australian Rules with Sale City Football Club in 2005 (U/12s) having played rugby league for four years with North Canberra Bears in the Canberra Junior Rugby League Competition. Anderson was part of the 2006 Div 2 Sale City (Red) premiership winning team.

Anderson returned to Canberra in 2007 and played for the Belconnen Cats u/14s for three seasons (including one season as an over-age player). This included at least six games in the Div 1 side in both 2008 and 2009. As a junior, Anderson played as a defender, outside mid- and mid-fielder.

== Senior football ==
Anderson was recruited to the Belconnen Magpies Women's AFL side in the AFL Canberra competition in 2010, debuting (aged 15) on the wing in April 2010. She was awarded the competition Rising Star award in that year, as well as placing in the top five in the Bainrot Medal for the competition best and fairest. Although Anderson initially played on the wing she shifted to the backline as a rebounding defender during her first year. Anderson played as a mid-fielder as a senior player from 2013.

Anderson continued to play for the Belconnen Magpies til 2015, before a transfer to Darwin. In Darwin, Anderson played for the Waratahs for the first half of the 2015/2016 season, before dislocating her right shoulder.

== Representative career ==
Anderson's first representative honour was in the ACT Under 18 Youth Girls team (aged 15) that played NSW in Wollongong in mid 2009. She followed this with selection in the ACT youth girls team for the same match in 2010, 2011 and 2012, including being recognised as best on ground at the 2010 match at Reid Oval, Canberra.

Anderson was selected in the ACT/NSW Under 18 team for the National Carnival in 2010, 2011 and 2012, was named as co-captain in 2010 and was named in the All-Australian team in 2010 and 2011.

Anderson was selected for the ACT Women's team at age 16 to play at the 2011 national carnival. She was also selected in the 2013 team for the national carnival, and was named in the All-Australian team and best-on-ground in the Division 2 final against South Australia.

In the draft for the 2015 Exhibition Matches, Anderson was taken with pick 19 by the Western Bulldogs. Playing as a rebounding defender, she was among the top possession-getters for the Bulldogs in the game at the MCG in May. Anderson rotated through the midfield and as a defender in the game at Etihad Stadium in August.

== AFLW career ==
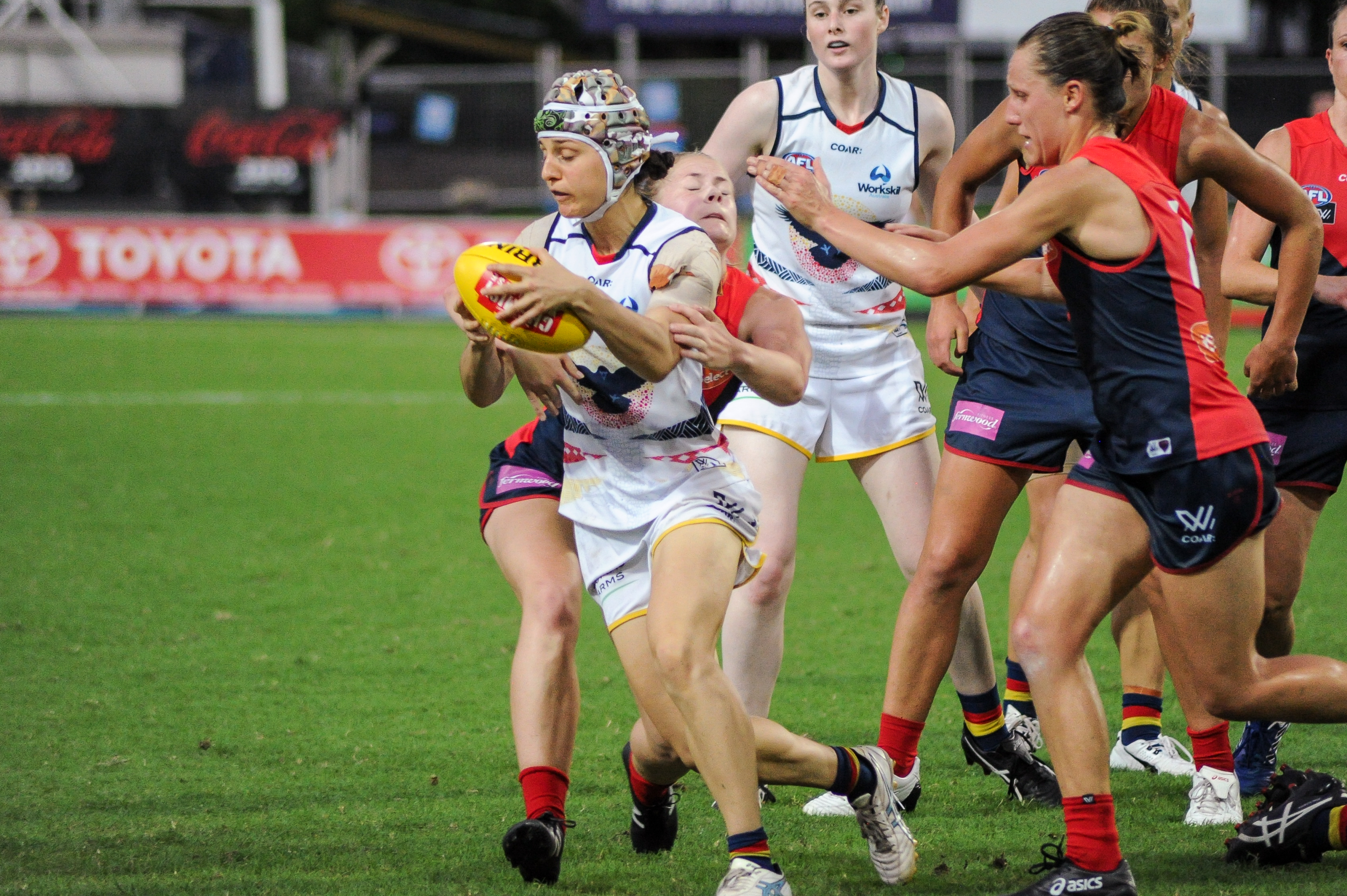
Anderson during the AFL Women's round six match between Adelaide and Melbourne in 2017

Anderson was drafted by Adelaide with their second selection and tenth overall in the 2016 AFL Women's draft. She made her debut in the thirty-six point win against Greater Western Sydney at Thebarton Oval in the opening round of the 2017 season. She was a part of Adelaide's premiership side after the club defeated Brisbane by six points at Metricon Stadium in the AFL Women's Grand Final. During the grand final, she dislocated her right shoulder which resulted in her second surgery on her right shoulder within a year. She played every match in her debut season to finish with eight matches.

Due to her shoulder injury, the club announced in May that she was delisted for the 2018 season. Anderson underwent surgery in April 2017 and completed rehabilitation ahead of the draft. She was not drafted and announced her retirement from AFL.

== Death and aftermath ==
On 13 November 2022, Anderson died by suicide at an army barracks in Perth, Western Australia. She was 28.

Her brain was donated to the Australian Sports Brain Bank after her death by her family. Researchers from the Australian Sports Brain Bank posthumously diagnosed her with chronic traumatic encephalopathy (CTE). She is the first female athlete diagnosed with this disease.
