= Sally Riley (footballer) =

Australian rules footballer (born 1990)

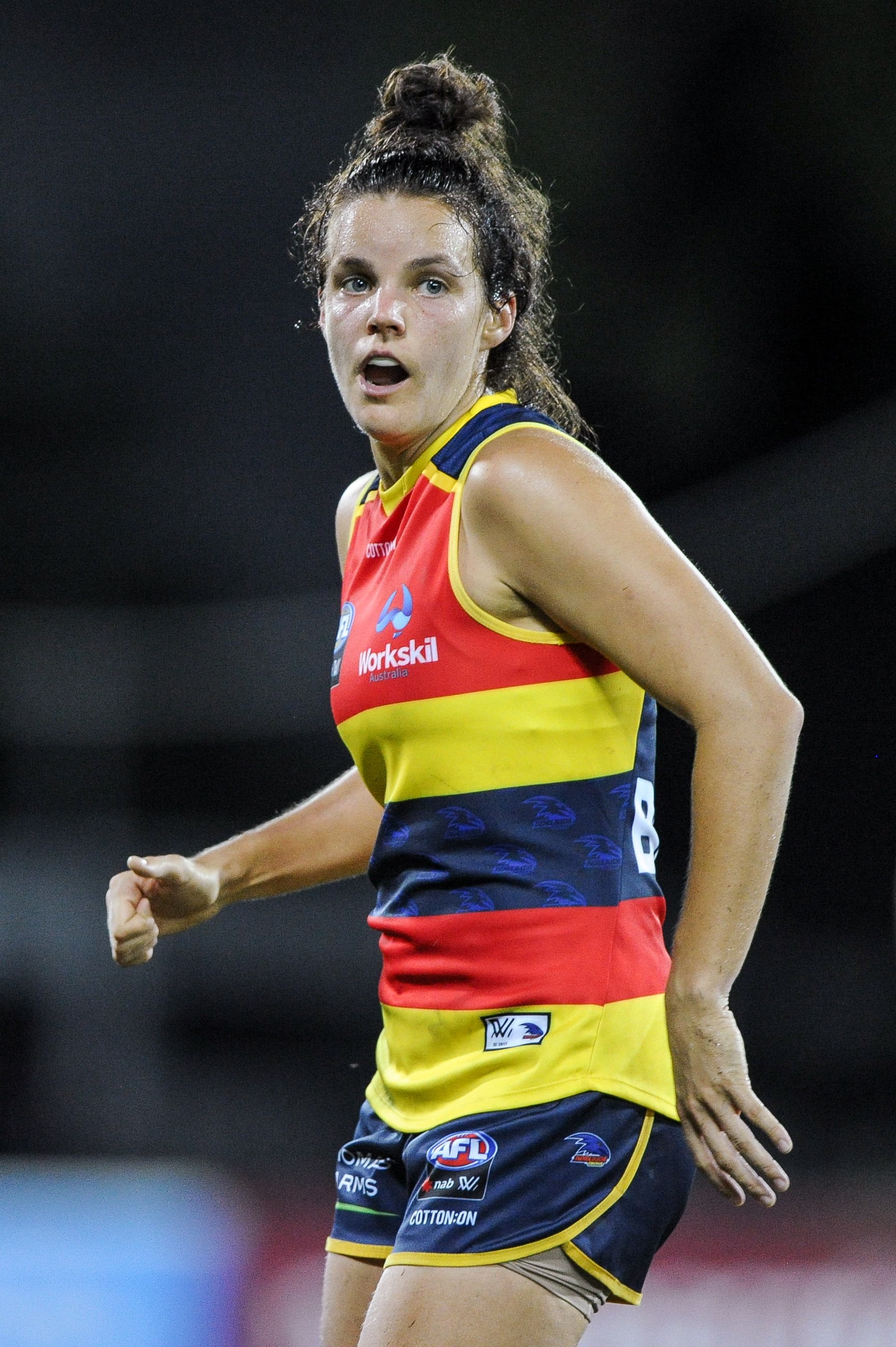
- Riley playing for Adelaide in January 2018

Personal information
- Born: 14 June 1990 (age 36)
- Original team: Tracy Village (NTFL)
- Draft: No. 39, 2016 AFL Women's draft
- Debut: Round 1, 2017, Adelaide vs. Greater Western Sydney, at Thebarton Oval
- Height: 172 cm (5 ft 8 in)
- Position: Utility

Playing career^{1}
Years	Club	Games (Goals)
2017–2019	Adelaide	14 (4)
2020–2021	Gold Coast	9 (0)
Total		23 (4)
- ^{1} Playing statistics correct to the end of the 2021 season.

Career highlights
- AFLW premiership player: 2017

Sally Riley (born 14 June 1990) is an Australian rules footballer who played for Adelaide and Gold Coast in the AFL Women's competition.

== AFLW ==
She was drafted by Adelaide with their fifth selection and thirty-ninth overall in the 2016 AFL Women's draft. She was named as Adelaide's inaugural co-vice-captain alongside Ange Foley in January 2017. She made her debut in the thirty-six point win against Greater Western Sydney at Thebarton Oval in the opening round of the 2017 season. She was a part of Adelaide's premiership side after the club defeated Brisbane by six points at Metricon Stadium in the AFL Women's Grand Final. She played every match in her debut season to finish with eight matches.

Adelaide signed Riley for the 2018 season during the trade period in May 2017. She was picked up by the Suns as a delisted free agent after the 2019 season. Riley played nine games for the Suns before retiring at the conclusion of the 2021 season. A strong leader, Riley was a vice-captain at Adelaide for two seasons and was in the Suns' leadership group across her two years.
