= Ella Ross =

Australian rules footballer (born 1992)

Personal information
- Born: 1 July 1992 (age 34)
- Original team: Queanbeyan (AFL Canberra)
- Draft: No. 112, 2016 AFL Women's draft
- Debut: Round 1, 2017, Greater Western Sydney vs. Adelaide, at Thebarton Oval
- Height: 164 cm (5 ft 5 in)
- Position: Midfielder

Playing career^{1}
| Years | Club | Games (Goals) |
| 2017 | Greater Western Sydney | 7 (0) |
- ^{1} Playing statistics correct to the end of 2017.

Ella Ross (born 1 July 1992) is an Australian rules footballer who played for the Greater Western Sydney Giants in the AFL Women's competition. Ross was drafted by Greater Western Sydney with their 14th selection and 112th overall in the 2016 AFL Women's draft. She made her debut in the thirty-six point loss to Adelaide at Thebarton Oval in the opening round of the 2017 season. She played every match in her debut season to finish with seven games. She was delisted at the end of the 2017 season. Ross spent 2018 playing with Richmond in the VFLW.
