= Alex Saundry =

Australian rules footballer (born 1992)

Personal information
- Born: 8 July 1992 (age 34)
- Original team: Melbourne University (VFL Womens)
- Debut: Round 1, 2017, Greater Western Sydney vs. Adelaide, at Thebarton Oval
- Height: 167 cm (5 ft 6 in)
- Position: Defender

Playing career^{1}
Years	Club	Games (Goals)
2017–2018	Greater Western Sydney	4 (0)
- ^{1} Playing statistics correct to the end of the 2018 season.

Alexandra Saundry (born 8 July 1992) is an Australian rules footballer who played for the Greater Western Sydney Giants in the AFL Women's competition. Saundry was recruited by Greater Western Sydney as a free agent in October 2016. She made her debut in the thirty-six point loss to Adelaide at Thebarton Oval in the opening round of the 2017 season. She played four matches in her debut season. She was delisted by Greater Western Sydney at the end of the 2018 season.
