= Dayna Cox =

Australian rules footballer

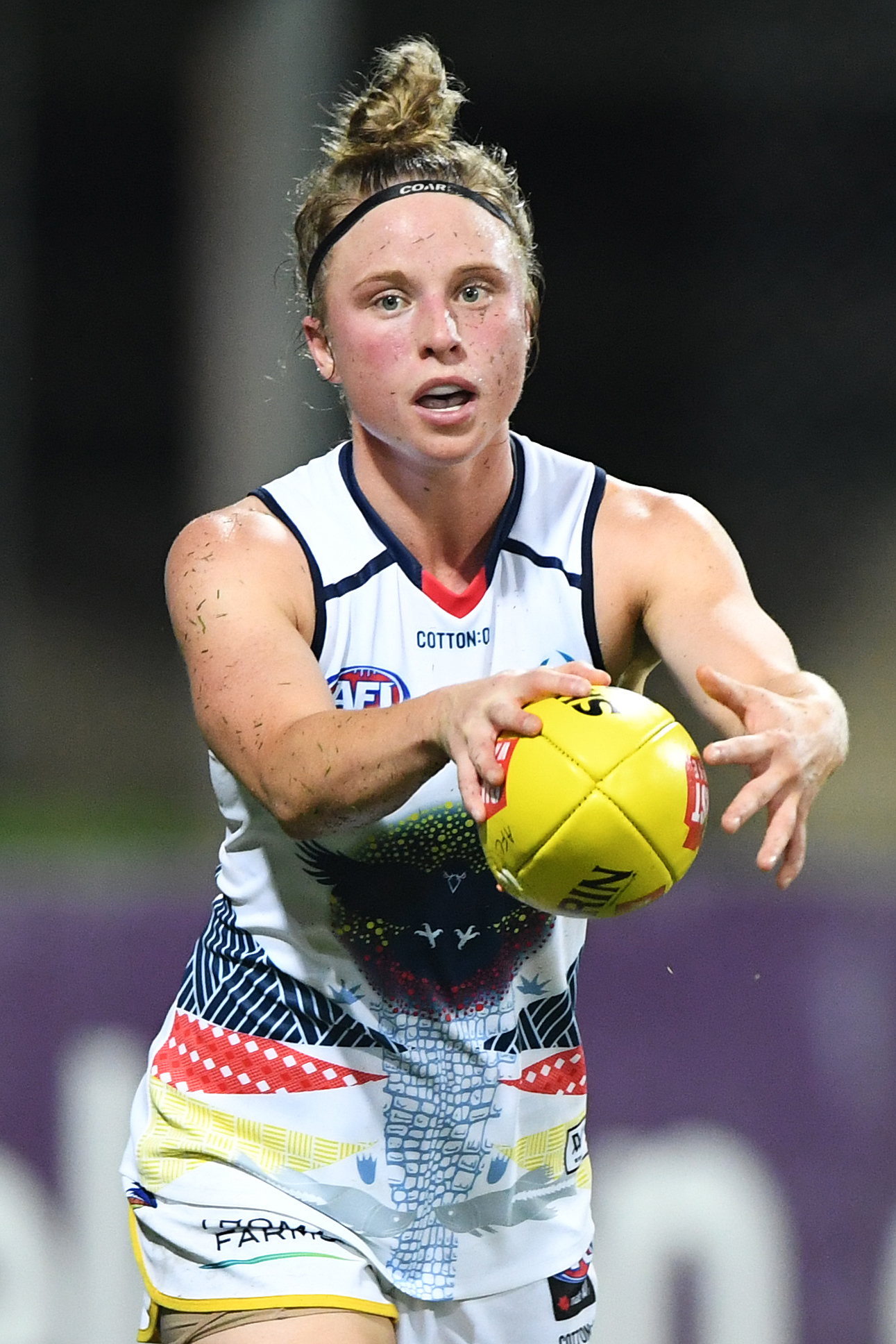
- Cox playing for Adelaide in January 2019

Personal information
- Born: 12 August 1993 (age 33)
- Original team: Morphettville Park (SAWFL)
- Draft: 2016 free agent: Adelaide
- Debut: Round 1, 2017, Adelaide vs. Greater Western Sydney, at Thebarton Oval
- Height: 163 cm (5 ft 4 in)
- Position: Midfielder

Playing career^{1}
Years	Club	Games (Goals)
2017–S7 (2022)	Adelaide	32 (0)
- ^{1} Playing statistics correct to the end of the S7 (2022) season.

Career highlights
- 2× AFL Women's premiership player: 2017, 2019

Dayna Cox (born 12 August 1993) is a retired Australian rules footballer, who played for the Adelaide Football Club in the AFL Women's competition. A small defender, she made her debut in the AFLW in 2017 and played every match for the season. She was part of Adelaide's premiership team, winning the Grand Final.

== Career ==
Cox played football for Morphettville Park Football Club in the South Australian Women's Football League. During her early career she faced injury setbacks, but she became one of the best players in the state and played several exhibition matches representing South Australia in 2016. After missing out on selection in the 2016 AFL Women's draft, she was signed by the Adelaide Crows as a free agent to become the final member of their inaugural squad in October 2016.

Cox made her AFLW debut in the thirty-six point win against Greater Western Sydney at Thebarton Oval in the opening round of the 2017 season. In the seventh and final round of the regular season, she was charged with striking Collingwood player Alicia Eva, putting her in jeopardy of playing in the Grand Final the following week. The Match Review Panel judged the contact to be low impact, so with an early guilty plea she was given a reprimand and allowed to play. She was a part of Adelaide's premiership side when the club defeated Brisbane by six points at Metricon Stadium. She played every match in her debut season to finish with eight matches.

Adelaide signed Cox for the 2018 season during the trade period in May 2017. During the Crows' round three match against the Western Bulldogs, Cox was reported twice for striking, receiving a reprimand for the first incident and a one-match suspension for the second.

In June 2022, the Crows announced that Cox would be placed on the Club's inactive list for AFL Women's season seven commencing in August 2022, due to her work commitments with the South Australia Police.

In February 2023, Cox announced her retirement.

== Player profile ==
Cox is a small defender who plays on half-back, both tagging a forward and providing an avenue out of defence. Upon signing her in 2016, coach Bec Goddard said, “She is a fantastic chase down tackler and she also loves to push forward from half-back to kick a goal."
