= Deni Varnhagen =

Australian rules footballer

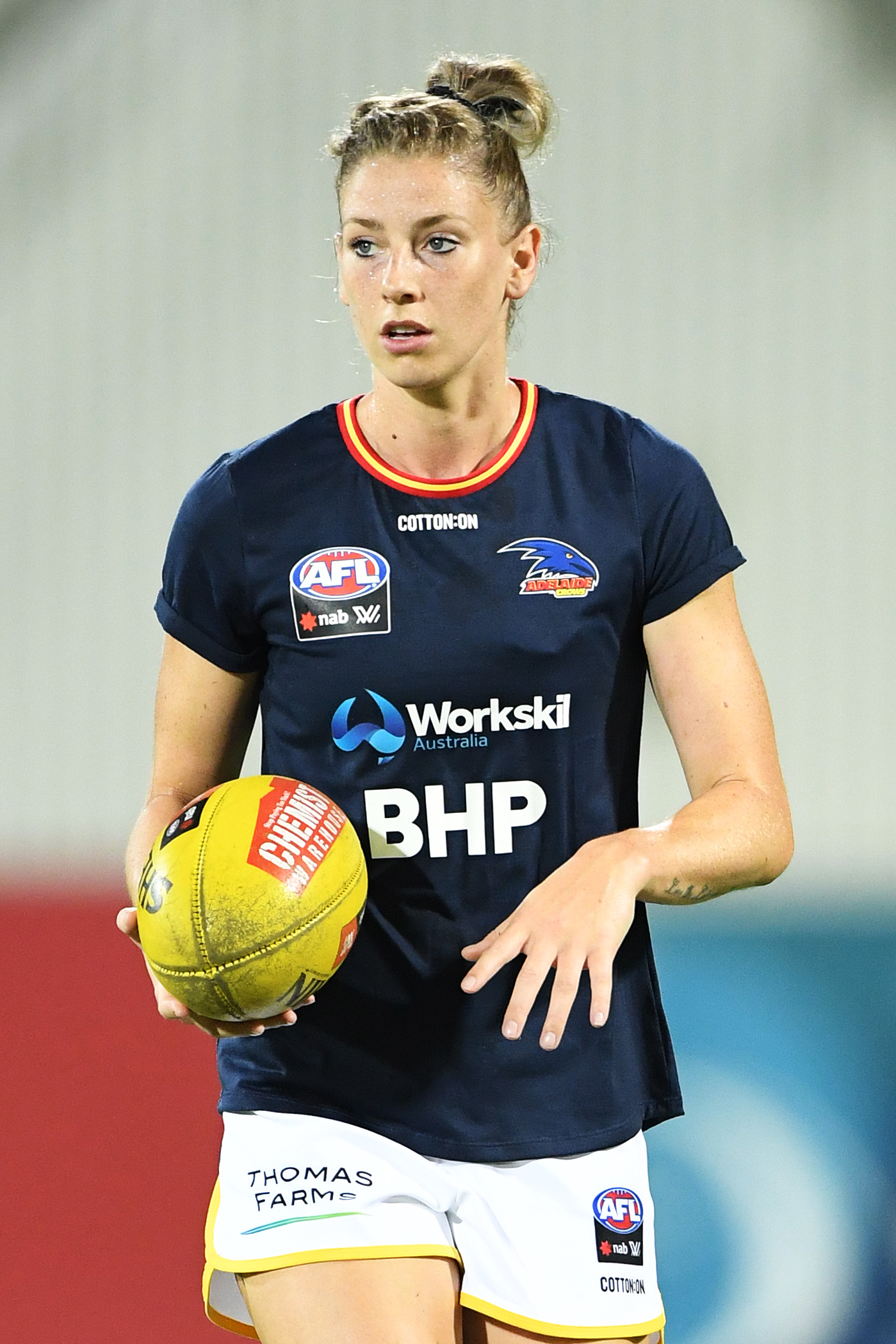
- Varnhagen with Adelaide in January 2019

Personal information
- Nicknames: Den, Denis
- Born: 26 October 1992 (age 34); Adelaide, South Australia
- Original team: Morphettville Park (SAWFL)
- Draft: No. 26, 2016 AFL Women's draft
- Debut: Round 1, 2017, Adelaide vs. Greater Western Sydney, at Thebarton Oval
- Height: 173 cm (5 ft 8 in)
- Position: Midfielder

Club information
- Current club: Adelaide
- Number: 9

Playing career^{1}
Years	Club	Games (Goals)
2017–2024	Adelaide	38 (6)
- ^{1} Playing statistics correct to the end of 2024.

Career highlights
- 2× AFL Women's premiership player: 2017, 2019

Deni Varnhagen (born 26 October 1992) is a former Australian rules footballer who played for the Adelaide Football Club in the AFL Women's competition. She is a two-time premiership player.

== Early life and state football ==
At the age of nine, Varnhagen started playing Australian rules football with the boys' team at the primary school in Happy Valley, where she was raised. Her coach was Phil Harper, who later on became the General Manager of Football Administration at Adelaide while Varnhagen played for them. Varnhagen continued playing junior football with the boys' team at Plympton, captaining them and winning the best and fairest award. Having to stop playing football due to her gender, Varnhagen played soccer and softball instead, representing South Australia in them, before returning to football, joining Morphettville Park. With Morphettville Park she won three premierships in a row. While playing for Morphettville Park, she represented South Australia in an exhibition match against NSW/ACT, which was played at Adelaide Oval as a curtain-raiser to a regular season match between Adelaide and St Kilda. She was named among South Australia's best, leading them to a two point victory while topping the disposal tally with 20 kicks and five handballs. Varnhagen played 10 matches in 2018–2019 with the NT Thunder in the VFL Women's.

== AFL Women's career ==
Varnhagen was drafted by Adelaide with their fourth selection and twenty-sixth overall in the 2016 AFL Women's draft. Phil Harper, the General Manager of Football Administration, who had coached her at Happy Valley said that "she was a bit of a star all along." She made her debut in the thirty-six point win against Greater Western Sydney at Thebarton Oval in the opening round of the 2017 season, kicking a goal, tallying twelve disposals, and catching a team-high four marks. She helped Adelaide claim their first premiership, scoring a goal in the club's six point victory over Brisbane at Metricon Stadium in the AFL Women's Grand Final. She played every match in her debut season to finish with eight matches. Adelaide signed Varnhagen for the 2018 season during the trade period in May 2017. In 2019, Varnhagen helped Adelaide became a dual premiership player, helping Adelaide claim their second premiership. She won Adelaide's Best Defensive Player award, averaging a career-best 11 disposals, 2.1 tackles and 1.9 rebound 50s per game. As well as her defensive pressure, she also kicked four goals and delivered 45 inside 50s. In 2021, Varnhagen was the source of some controversy after refusing to be vaccinated for COVID-19. At the time, the league did not have a vaccination policy. After the league released its policy, stating that all players and staff must receive their first vaccination by 19 November and be fully vaccinated by 17 December, Varnhagen and the club mutually agreed to place her on the inactive list. She returned to playing for Adelaide in 2023, after the league dropped the vaccination requirement.
