= Rachael Killian =

Australian rules footballer

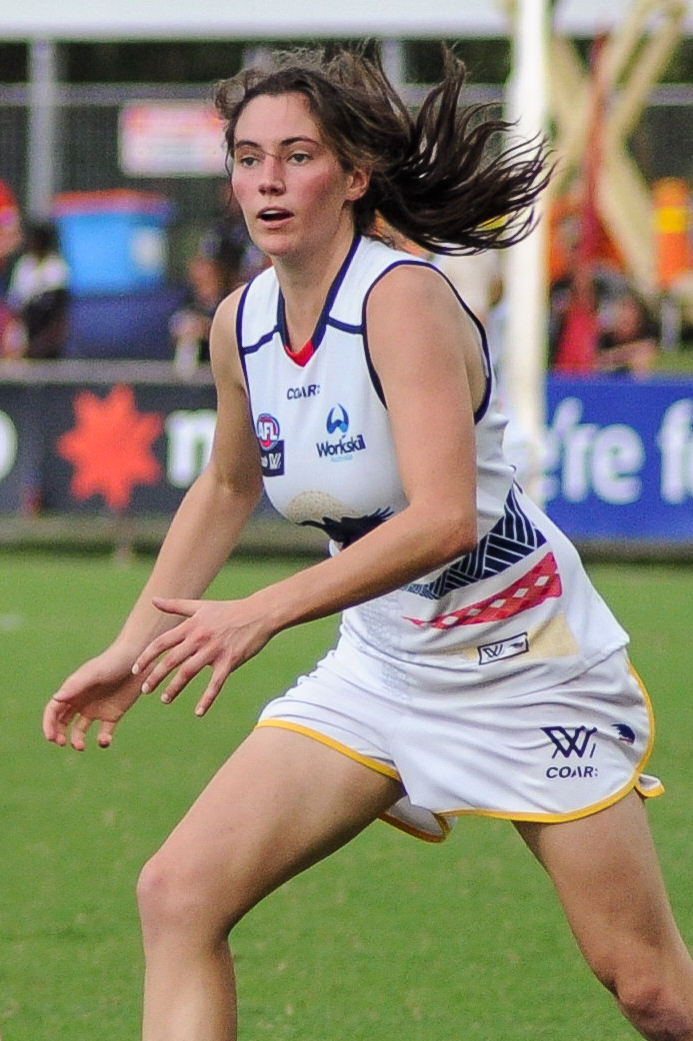
- Killian playing for Adelaide in March 2017

Personal information
- Born: 15 July 1994 (age 32)
- Original team: West Adelaide (SAWFL)
- Draft: No. 71, 2016 AFL Women's draft
- Debut: Round 2, 2017, Adelaide vs. Western Bulldogs, at VU Whitten Oval
- Height: 174 cm (5 ft 9 in)
- Position: Midfielder

Playing career^{1}
| Years | Club | Games (Goals) |
| 2017–2018 | Adelaide | 8 (2) |
- ^{1} Playing statistics correct to the end of the 2018 season.

Career highlights
- AFLW premiership player: 2017

Rachael Killian (born 15 July 1994) is an Australian rules footballer who played for the Adelaide Football Club in the AFL Women's competition. She was drafted by Adelaide with their ninth selection and seventy-first overall in the 2016 AFL Women's draft. She made her debut in the twenty-five point win against the Western Bulldogs at VU Whitten Oval in round two of the 2017 season. She missed the round five match against Brisbane at Norwood Oval as a late withdrawal, before returning for the round six match against Melbourne at TIO Stadium. She was a part of Adelaide's premiership side after the club defeated Brisbane by six points at Metricon Stadium in the AFL Women's Grand Final. She played managed six matches in her debut season.

Adelaide signed Killian for the 2018 season during the trade period in May 2017. She was delisted by Adelaide at the end of the 2018 season due to injury.
