= Rhiannon Metcalfe =

Australian rules footballer

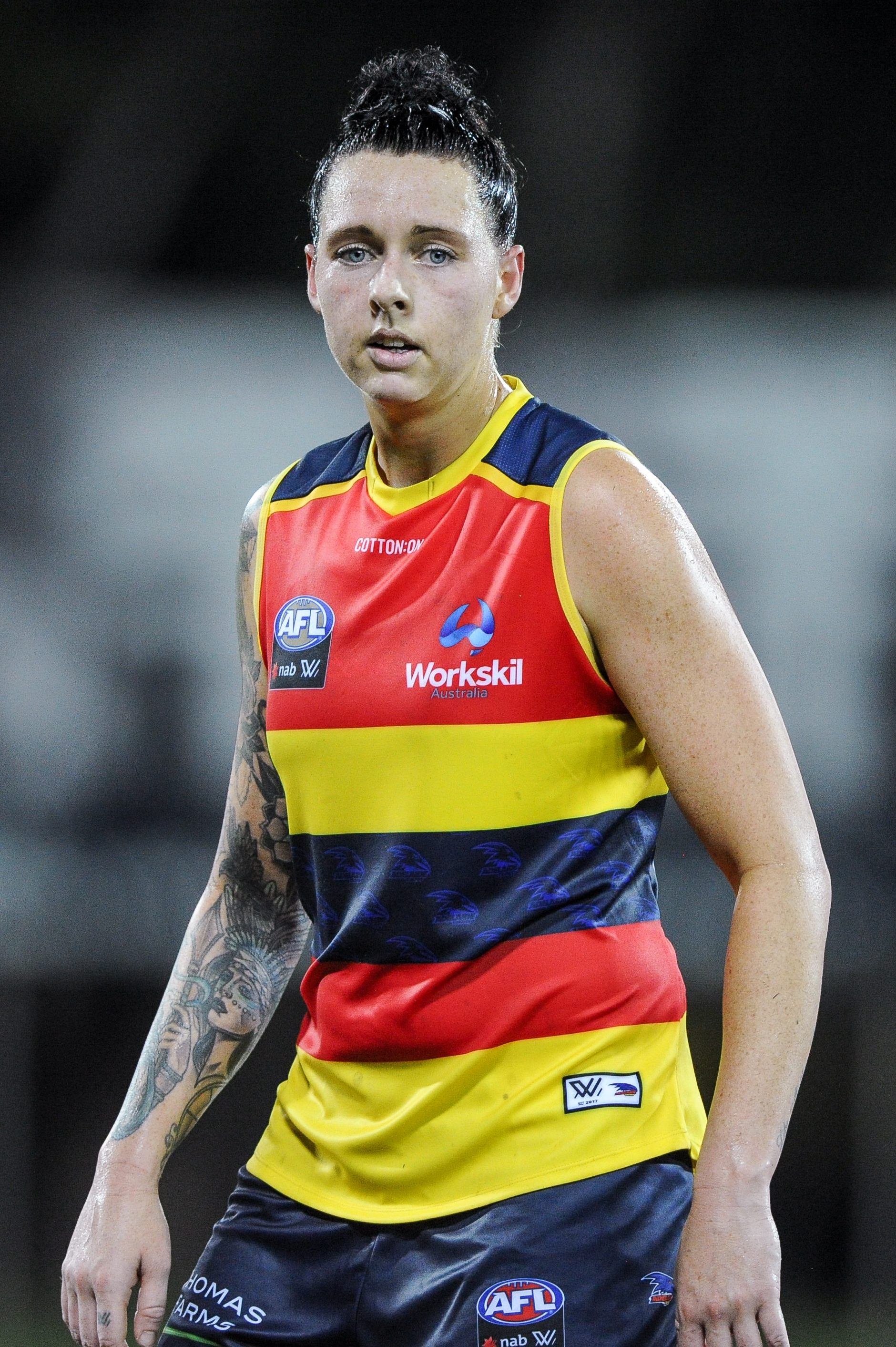
- Metcalfe playing for Adelaide in January 2018

Personal information
- Born: 27 September 1991 (age 35); Nelson Bay, New South Wales
- Original team: Gungahlin (AFL Canberra)
- Draft: No. 74, 2016 AFL Women's draft
- Debut: Round 1, 2017, Adelaide vs. Greater Western Sydney, at Thebarton Oval
- Height: 185 cm (6 ft 1 in)
- Position: Ruck

Playing career
| Years | Club | Games (Goals) |
| 2017–2022 (S6) | Adelaide | 26 (1) |

Career highlights
- AFLW premiership player: 2017

Rhiannon Metcalfe (born 27 September 1991) is a former Australian rules footballer who played for the Adelaide Football Club in the AFL Women's competition.

== State football ==
Metcalfe started playing Australian rules football in 2015, picking up the game in an annual women's football camp held by the Australian Defence Force (ADF). She made the final team and was voted as Best First Year Player. She then represented the ADF against Victoria, helping the ADF win in Melbourne on Anzac Day. At the end of the season she joined Western Wolves in the Sydney Women's AFL. In the Navy, she was selected in the leadership group and also voted the most valuable player. At the start of 2016, due to relocating, Metcalfe joined Gungahlin in AFL Canberra Women's. She also represented Canberra against Sydney and was selected as best on ground.

== AFL Women's career ==
Metcalfe was drafted by Adelaide with their tenth selection and seventy-fourth overall in the 2016 AFL Women's draft, after requesting from the Royal Australian Navy a posting in Adelaide and selecting South Australia as her preferred destination. She made her debut in the thirty-six point win against Greater Western Sydney at Thebarton Oval in the opening round of the 2017 season. She was a part of Adelaide's premiership side after the club defeated Brisbane by six points at Metricon Stadium in the AFL Women's Grand Final. She played every match in her debut season to finish with eight matches. Adelaide signed Metcalfe for the 2018 season during the trade period in May 2017, and was the starting ruck in the 2018 season too. In a trial match against Fremantle, ahead of the 2019 season, Metcalfe tore her left anterior cruciate ligament, resulting in her missing the season and Jess Foley filling her spot in the ruck. Despite her injury, she re-signed with the club for the 2020 season, kicking a goal in her return against Carlton in round 4 of the season.

She spent 2022 season 6 on the inactive list due to work commitments, following which she announced her retirement from the AFLW.

== Personal life ==
Metcalfe was born in Nelson Bay and was later relocated to Canberra. Metcalfe is in the Royal Australian Navy, working in the field of electronic warfare, responsible for using sensitive electronic receivers that deal with emissions in the ship's vicinity. She was an able seaman when she was drafted, but has risen in the ranks to be a leading seaman.
