= 2017 AFL Women's Grand Final =

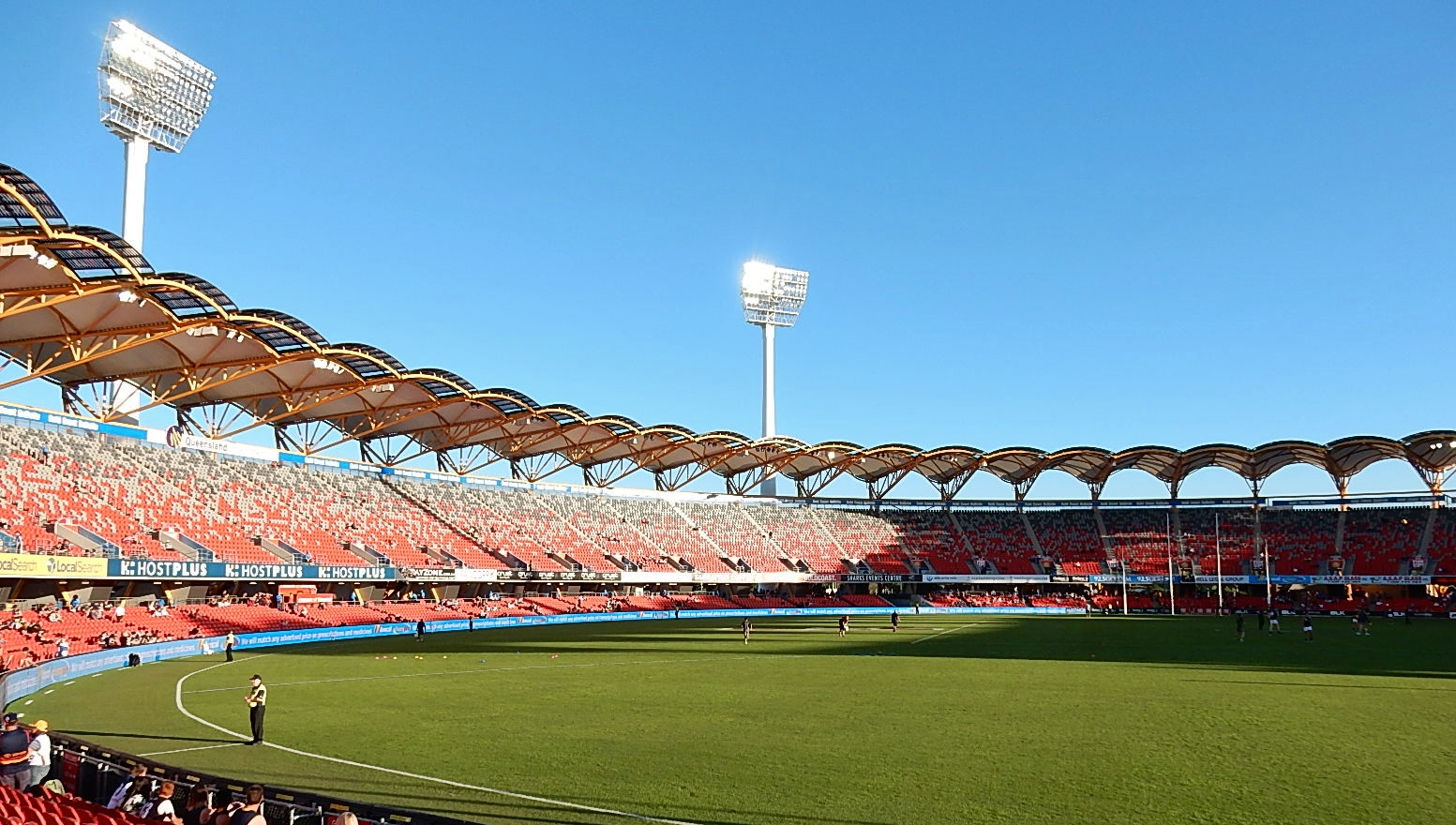
- Metricon Stadium, where the grand final was held.

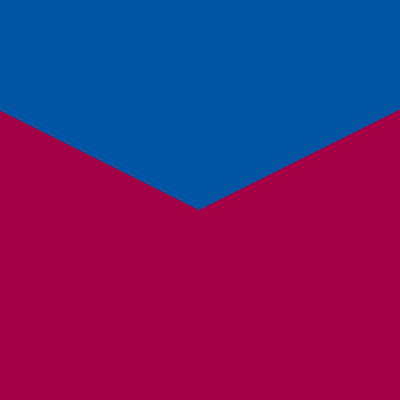

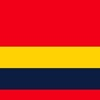
Brisbane	Adelaide
4.5 (29)	4.11 (35)
	1	2	3	4
BL	1.0 (6)	2.1 (13)	3.3 (21)	4.5 (29)
ADE	2.1 (13)	2.7 (19)	4.9 (33)	4.11 (35)
- Date: 25 March 2017
- Stadium: Metricon Stadium
- Attendance: 15,610
- Umpires: Tom Bryce; Ben Cheever; Martin Rodger

Ceremonies
- National anthem: Megan Washington

Broadcast in Australia
- Network: Seven Network
- Commentators: Jason Bennett, Mark Soderstrom, Daisy Pearce, Katie Brennan, Sam Lane

The 2017 AFL Women's Grand Final was an Australian rules football match held on 25 March 2017 to determine the premiers of the 2017 AFL Women's season, the league's inaugural season. Adelaide were victorious over minor premiers Brisbane, claiming the first AFL Women's premiership by a score of 35 points to 29. Brisbane had entered the grand final as undefeated, conceding only one draw during the season, while Adelaide conceded two losses, including a three-point loss to Brisbane in the fifth round.

In the weeks prior to the match, concern centered around the venue of the match. While Brisbane opted to host the game at their traditional home ground, the Gabba, the issue of damage to its pitch as a result of the Adele Live 2017 concert held three weeks prior, and its management by ground curator Kevin Mitchell, became the subject of public controversy and tension between the club, the AFL and Gabba management. Due to the venue's condition, the match was moved to Metricon Stadium, to act as a curtain-raiser to the round one "QClash" of the 2017 AFL season.

== Background ==
The inaugural season of the AFL Women's competition, which featured eight teams, made use of a best-two qualification system straight through to the grand final, instead of a finals series system similar to the Australian Football League (AFL). The top two teams on the premiership ladder at the end of a seven-round home-and-away season would compete for the premiership in the grand final. The team that wins the minor premiership also wins the rights to host the match. The date of the match was set for 25 March, serving as a curtain-raiser match for the first round of the 2017 AFL season. The match was scheduled for an early afternoon start at 1:00 pm Australian Eastern Standard Time to boost attendance and television ratings, when no AFL matches were occurring—the first match of the day, a clash between Sydney and Port Adelaide, was scheduled for a 4:35 pm start time. Three days before the match, the starting time was changed to five minutes earlier (12:55 pm) due to the application of the heat policy, with the quarter and half-time breaks extended.

=== Qualification ===
2017 AFL Women's season ladder (top 4)
#	Team	W	L	D	PF	PA	%	Pts
1	Brisbane	6	0	1	224	128	151.4	26
2	Adelaide	5	2	0	291	185	157.3	20
3	Melbourne	5	2	0	258	183	141.0	20
4	Carlton	3	3	1	261	232	112.5	14

Entering as wooden spoon favourites, Brisbane remained undefeated by the end of 2017 season, conceding only a draw with Carlton out of the season's seven games. After defeating the Western Bulldogs in round six and securing their sixth straight win, Brisbane mathematically qualified for a place in the 2017 AFL Women's Grand Final. After Adelaide, the second placed team, lost their sixth round match against Melbourne, Brisbane pulled away with two wins ahead of Adelaide at the beginning of the final round, securing the minor premiership and the right to host the grand final. For Melbourne to qualify for the grand final, they would have had to win their round seven match against Fremantle and due to Adelaide's advantage on points for/against, Adelaide would have had to lose their match against Collingwood. While Melbourne succeeded in defeating Fremantle by 54 points, the largest margin of the 2017 season, they were still behind Adelaide on point percentages. Adelaide secured their place in the grand final after a come-from-behind victory against Collingwood, noted for Sarah Perkins' four-goal performance. Both Adelaide and Melbourne finished the season with five wins and two losses, with Adelaide finishing with a 16.3 point percentage lead over Melbourne. The only match up between Adelaide and Brisbane before the grand final was Adelaide's 3-point loss to Brisbane in round five, which knocked Adelaide off the top of the ladder.

=== Venue ===
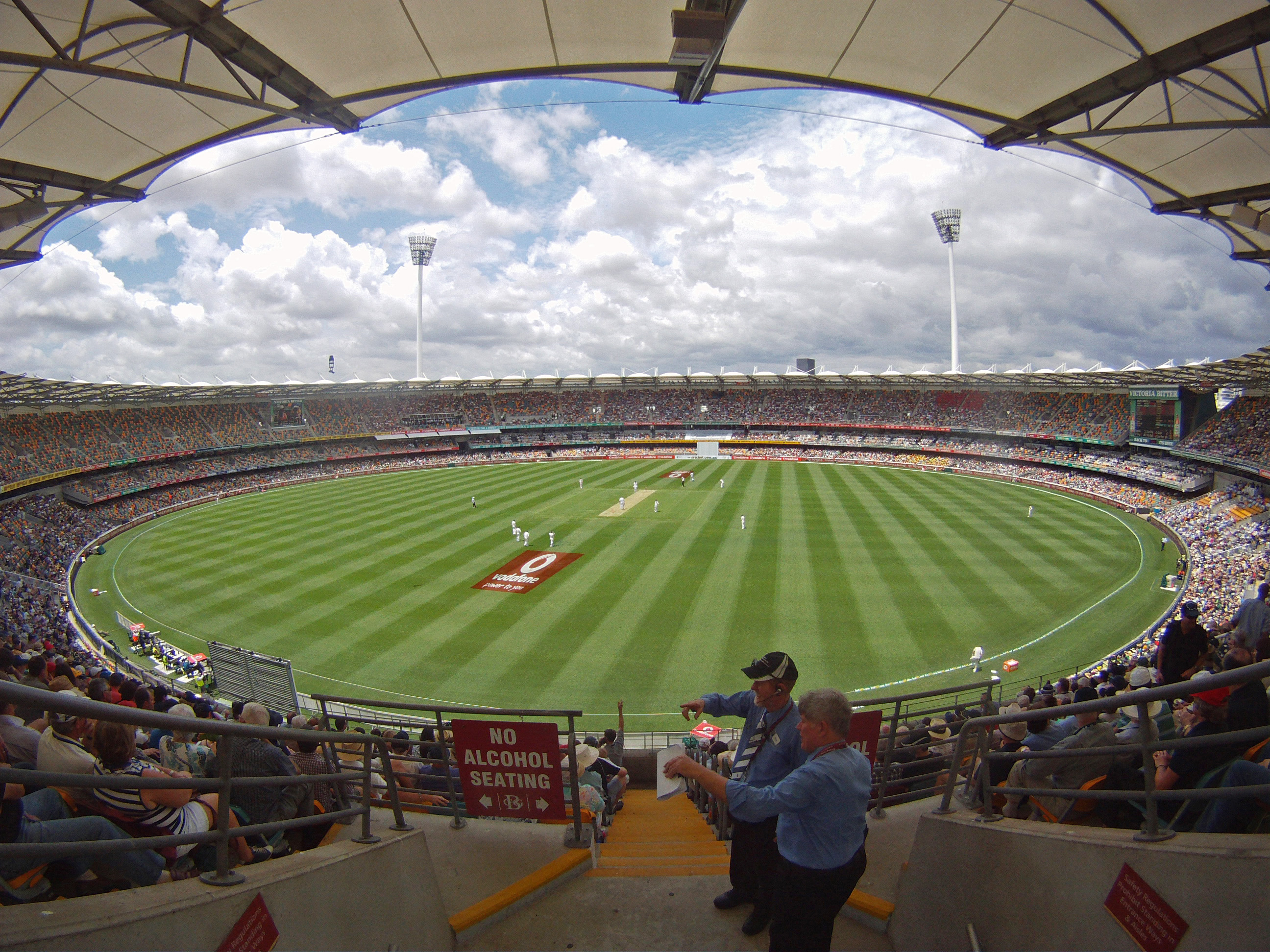
After Brisbane qualified to the grand final, the club pushed for the match to be held at their home ground, the Gabba.

After a higher-than-anticipated turnout to games in the first round of the season, capacity became an issue to AFL Women's organisers, who considered holding the grand final at the Melbourne Cricket Ground in the event that a Melbourne team became minor premiers. The match would then serve as a curtain-raiser match for the AFL round one match between Essendon and Hawthorn, to be held at the ground at 7:25 pm. Docklands Stadium was ruled out due to an AFL clash between St Kilda and Melbourne at the stadium occurring at 4:35 pm—considered by organisers as not enough time between matches. As the season progressed, the likelihood rose of the match not being held in Melbourne, as Brisbane and Adelaide performed well in the first few rounds. Adelaide Oval was pinned by AFL general manager of football operations Simon Lethlean as a venue for the match if Adelaide hosted it, though the team's losses in rounds five and six prevented it from happening.

With Brisbane being favourites to host, the Gold Coast Football Club lobbied to hold the grand final at Metricon Stadium to prevent splitting crowds with the "QClash" match between Gold Coast and the Brisbane Lions being held on the same day at 6:25 pm, a plan backed by Lethlean. An alternative proposal, however, suggested the match be held at the Brisbane Lions' traditional home ground, the Gabba. After Brisbane became minor premiers and earned the right to host the grand final, concern for the Gabba's capability to host the match was raised. Floorboards installed at the venue for the Adele Live 2017 concerts in early March were originally due to be completely removed, and the pitch restored by 1 April, a week after the match. Despite this, enthusiasm from fans to host the match at the Gabba was shared by club leadership, who publicly expressed their preference to play at the stadium, and by marquee players Tayla Harris and Sabrina Frederick-Traub, with Frederick-Traub stating, "it's an iconic stadium and I’d love to play there. It would be great for Queensland football." The proposal was also supported by Queensland media, with some columnists such as Andrew Hamilton of The Courier-Mail criticising AFL Women's management for their organisation of the grand final.

On 20 March, it was confirmed via a decision by the Department of National Parks, Sport and Racing that Metricon Stadium would host the match, to be played six hours prior to the QClash which takes place later the same evening at the venue. It was found that the Adele Live 2017 concert had damaged the turf at the Gabba, and that the ground's curator, Kevin Mitchell, had made the decision to replace the turf—a process which would not be finished in time for the grand final. While the decision was praised by the Gold Coast, both Brisbane and AFL management publicly expressed their dissatisfaction, putting the blame on Mitchell and the Gabba's management and ground curator. The club accused Mitchell of prioritising the 2017–18 Ashes series, claiming that the cricket pitch had already been sewn in advance of the series' first test, which would occur over seven months after the grand final. Brisbane chief executive Greg Swann said the club had been "absolutely let down by the ground staff" at the Gabba and that "those responsible for managing the field of play should be held accountable for a decision that has denied our women's team the right to create history in front of our loyal supporters."

== Teams ==
The teams were announced on 23 March, with both teams opting to go into the match unchanged from the final round of the home and away season.

Brisbane
B:	5 Sam Virgo	11 Leah Kaslar	20 Shannon Campbell
HB:	16 Tahlia Randall	13 Kate Lutkins	3 Breanna Koenen
C:		6 Megan Hunt	
HF:	10 Kaitlyn Ashmore	14 Sabrina Frederick-Traub	9 Kate McCarthy
F:	27 Jordan Membrey	7 Tayla Harris	23 Jess Wuetschner
Foll:	4 Sharni Webb	1 Emily Bates	8 Emma Zielke (c)
Int:	24 Nikki Wallace	17 Jamie Stanton	22 Nicole Hildebrand
Int:	19 Selina Goodman	25 Brittany Gibson	18 Ally Anderson
Coach:	Craig Starcevich		

Adelaide
B:	19 Heather Anderson	4 Georgia Bevan	6 Talia Radan
HB:	33 Anne Hatchard	9 Deni Varnhagen	3 Ange Foley
C:		31 Dayna Cox	
HF:	10 Ebony Marinoff	13 Erin Phillips (c)	14 Stevie-Lee Thompson
F:	22 Courtney Cramey	28 Sarah Perkins	2 Kellie Gibson
Foll:	39 Sarah Allan	23 Justine Mules	8 Sally Riley
Int:	26 Chelsea Randall (c)	7 Rachael Killian	1 Abbey Holmes
Int:	11 Rhiannon Metcalfe	5 Jenna McCormick	17 Jess Sedunary
Coach:	Bec Goddard		

== Scorecard ==
2017 AFL Women's Grand Final
Saturday, 25 March (12:55 pm)	Brisbane	def. by	Adelaide	Metricon Stadium (crowd: 15,610)	Report
1.0 (6); 2.1 (13); 3.3 (21); 4.5 (29)	Q1; Q2; Q3; Final	2.1 (13); 2.7 (19); 4.9 (33); 4.11 (35)	Best on ground: Erin Phillips; Television broadcast: Seven Network; National anthem: Megan Washington
Wuetschner 2, Frederick-Traub, Harris	Goals	Phillips 2, Gibson, Varnhagen
Bates, Frederick-Traub, Virgo, Kaslar, Hunt, Ashmore	Best	Phillips, Randall, Marinoff, Cramey, Gibson, Bevan
Koenen (ankle)	Injuries	Anderson (shoulder)

== Media coverage ==
The 2017 AFL Women's Grand Final was broadcast on the Seven Network, as part of a broadcasting rights deal that saw Seven West Media gain broadcasting rights to all matches of the 2017 AFL Women's season, airing on the Seven Network, 7mate, or the video on demand service, PLUS7. Outside of Australia, it was made available live and for replay on the Watch AFL subscription web site and app.
