= Thebarton Oval =

Sports ground in Adelaide, South Australia

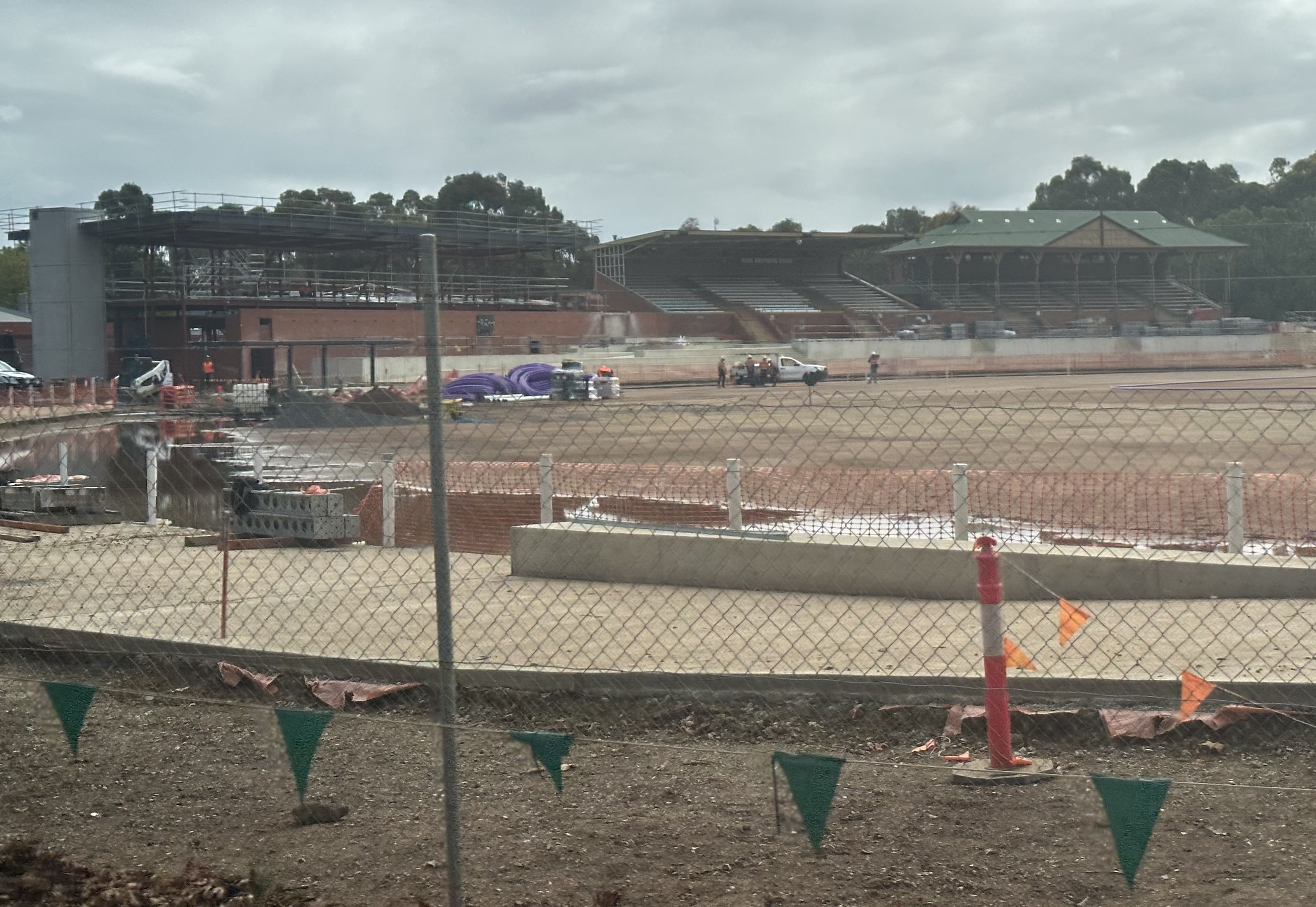
- Thebarton Oval during redevelopment in 2026
- Interactive map of Thebarton Oval
- Former names: Adelaide Airport Stadium (2012–2015); Aldi Arena (2016–2019); Guardall Security Stadium (2019)
- Address: Ashley Street; Torrensville, South Australia
- Coordinates: 34°55′2″S 138°33′53″E
- Owner: City of West Torrens
- Operator: Adelaide Footy League
- Capacity: 15,000
- Surface: Grass
- Record attendance: 20,832 – West Torrens vs Norwood, 26 May 1962
- Field size: Football: 161m x 135m

Construction
- Opened: 1922

Tenants
- Australian rules football West Torrens Football Club (SANFL) (1922–1989); Woodville-West Torrens Football Club (SANFL) (2006–2016); South Australian Amateur Football League (2008–present); Adelaide Football Club (AFLW) (2027 onwards) Other sports West Torrens Cricket Club (1921–1988); Gridiron Association of South Australia (1989–96, 2010–11); South Australian Rugby League (1992–95); South Australian baseball team (2003–08)

Thebarton Oval is an Australian rules football venue located in the Adelaide suburb of Torrensville. It is expected to become the training facility and headquarters of the Adelaide Football Club from late 2026, following the completion of redevelopment works that began in 2025.

The venue was the home of the West Torrens Football Club in the South Australian National Football League (SANFL) from 1922 until the end of 1989, when it moved to Football Park shortly before merging with Woodville.

== History ==
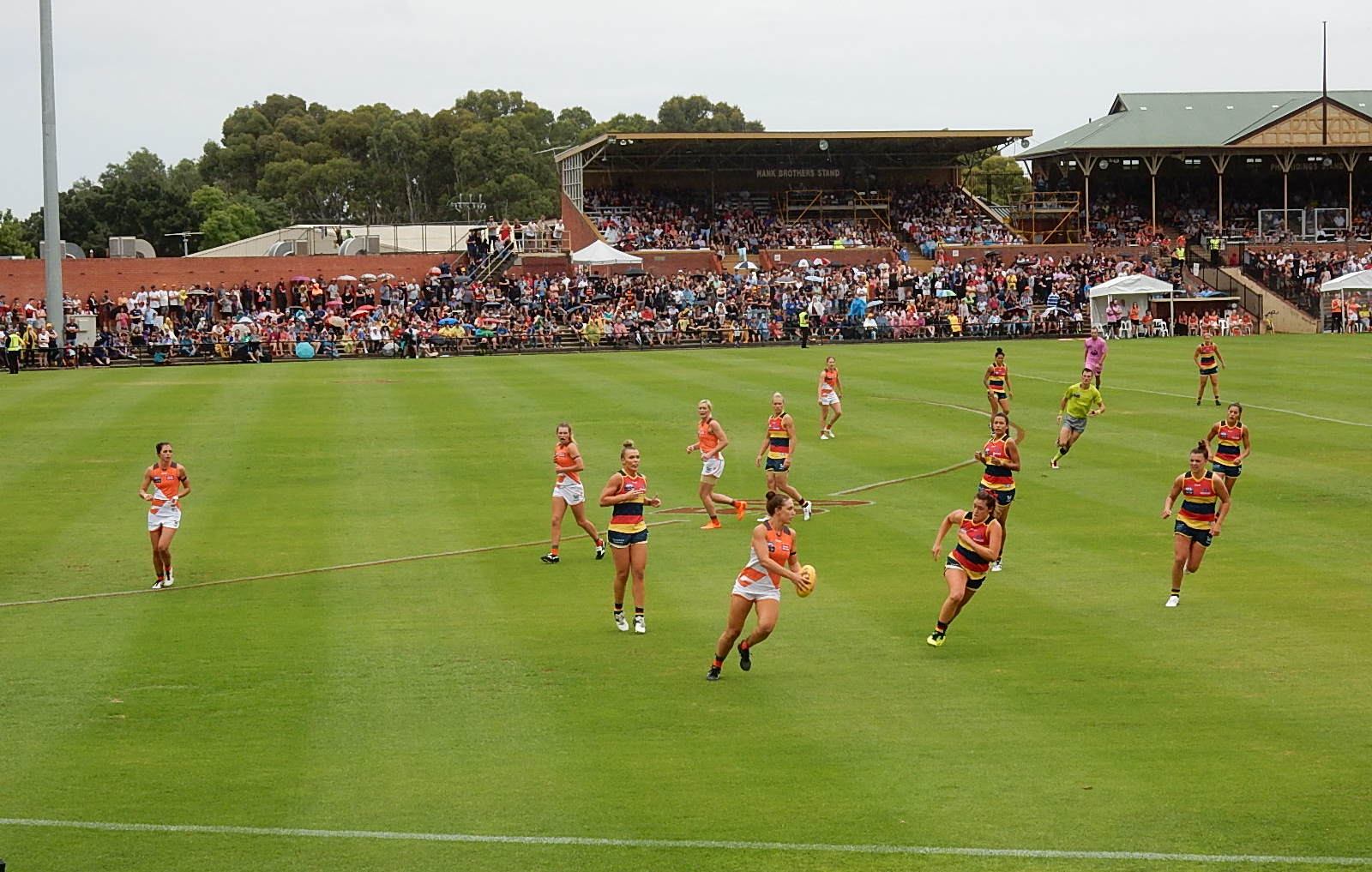
Thebarton Oval during an AFL Women's match in round 1 of the 2017 season, with a crowd of 9,289 people

Thebarton Oval has a rich sporting and cultural history; being home over the years to a number of other sports including harness racing, cricket, speedway, soccer, gridiron, baseball, cycling, and rugby league.

In the 1920s and early 1930s Thebarton Oval hosted weekly harness racing meetings. Brooklyn Park locals and popular SA harness racing pioneers Malcolm Allan and his wife Mary McGowan were weekly winners, riding horses such as Woodnuts Choice, Huon Wood, Western Queen, Seaweed and Silent Ways. (see Brooklyn Park for information about Allan and McGowan).

Thebarton Oval was also the home ground for the West Torrens District Cricket Club and home oval for Ron Hamence (member of Bradman's 1948 Invincibles), Bruce Dooland, Phil Ridings and World Series Cricket hero David Hookes.

The record crowd at Thebarton was set on 26 May 1962 when 20,832 fans turned up to see West Torrens take on SANFL rivals Norwood.

After first playing their home games at Jubilee Oval (1887-1904) and Hindmarsh Oval (1905-1921), West Torrens moved from Hindmarsh to the nearby Thebarton Oval in 1922. Thebarton would remain the home of West Torrens until 1989. During these years players such as Bob Hank, Lindsay Head MBE, Fred Bills, Matt Rendell, Bruce Lindsay and Michael Long called Thebarton Oval home.

The Eagles moved to Football Park for 1990 before their perilous financial situation forced them into a merger with the Woodville Football Club from 1991. The new club would be known as the Woodville-West Torrens Eagles and would use the Warriors ground Woodville Oval as their home base.

West Torrens played their last game at the ground in on 2 September 1989 ending a run of 68 seasons at Thebarton Oval. After the Eagles left, the ground subsequently deteriorated through lack of maintenance, though other sports would regularly use the oval including cricket, rugby league, baseball, gridiron and soccer. The South Australian Amateur Football League (SAAFL) also regularly used Thebarton Oval. In 2008 the SAAFL set up their headquarters at the ground, which saw a permanent return of football to Thebarton.

Due to Woodville Oval's use by Grade Cricket in the summer months, Woodville-West Torrens used Thebarton as their pre-season base until 2016, as well as having played two games there (2009 and 2012). This has seen efforts made to upgrade the ground in the past few years including, upgrading the areas surrounding the ground, replaced the perimeter fencing, installing new seating in the stands, and a complete replacement of the grounds light towers.

In March 2012, it was announced that Thebarton Oval would be renamed Adelaide Airport Stadium, following a sponsorship agreement with Adelaide Airport. Following this agreement the oval was named Aldi Arena in a further three year sponsorship agreement which ceased at the end of the 2018 season.

On Friday 23 March 2012, Thebarton Oval hosted its first SANFL match since 2009, and its first night game since the 1983 Escort Cup Grand Final, when the reigning premier Eagles hosted their hated rivals from Port Adelaide to open the 2012 SANFL season. The game was taken to Thebarton not only to take advantage of the upgraded lights and open the season with a Friday night game, but because of the unavailability of the Eagles usual home ground Unleash Solar Oval due to being in use for Grade Cricket. The Magpies spoiled the Eagles' first game under lights at the former West Torrens home ground with a 55-point win 18.13 (121) to 10.6 (66) in front of 4,566 fans.

On 4 February 2017, Thebarton Oval hosted the first ever AFL Women's (AFLW) game held in Adelaide. This was the first premiership game for the Adelaide and Greater Western Sydney AFLW teams. The Crows played two of their four 2017 home games at the venue. They attracted 9,289 fans to their first game, against GWS, and 9,006 to their second game, against Carlton. Their other two home games were played at Norwood Oval and Marrara Oval, Darwin. All games held in Adelaide moved to Norwood Oval for the 2018 season.

The Woodville-West Torrens Eagles still play pre-season games at the ground as of 2021.

== Facilities ==
The ground consists of concrete terracing all around the oval with a mound extending the entire outer wing as well as two grandstands on the north-west wing with seating in the Hank Brothers Stand and the Phil Ridings Stand for up to 3,500 people. The grounds current football dimensions are 160m x 130m. The Hank Brothers Stand was originally going to be named the Bob Hank Stand in honor of West Torrens two-time Magarey Medallist. However, at Hank's insistence, the name was changed to recognize his brothers Bill and Ray and their contribution to the club. All three brothers were prominent members of the strong West Torrens teams of the 1950s (including the 1953 SANFL premiership win, the last West Torrens would win as a stand-alone club), and thus the name became the Hank Brothers Stand.

Thebarton Oval is owned by the City of West Torrens which has leased out the ground to a series of tenants since 1991. The current major tenant is the South Australian Amateur Football League (SAAFL), who use the venue as an administrative and training base, as well as a venue for some matches during the season including grand finals. The SANFL Umpires department is also based at Thebarton, with umpires training there during the SANFL Season.

With Woodville-West Torrens looking to play selected SANFL night games at the venue after Friday night games at other suburban grounds that had lights installed had proved popular, the SAAFL made efforts to upgrade the six light towers at the oval. The lights had been installed when night football became popular in the 1950s, and along with Norwood Oval, Thebarton was a regular host of the SANFL night series, including hosting most of the night Grand Finals until Football Park's lights were first used in 1984.

The original six light towers that had been in place for almost 60 years, despite no longer being in use by the SANFL (though they were used by the SAAFL and other sports until 2011), were finally torn down in mid-2012. In their place four new light towers, each holding 18 lights giving three different levels of lighting, were installed and ready for use by March 2012 and were first used in full for the opening game of the 2012 SANFL season.

The three levels of lighting are:

- Level one for training
- level two for SAAFL night games
- Level three (full) for SANFL night games

Thebarton hosted the last ever SANFL Night Grand Final held at a suburban ground when the 1983 SANFL Escort Cup Grand Final was played between West Torrens and South Adelaide. The Glenn Elliott coached Eagles won their last SANFL championship by defeating the Graham Cornes coached Panthers 7.15 (57) to 5.7 (37). It would be the last SANFL night game played at a suburban ground until Norwood started playing night home games in the early 2000s.

== Adelaide Football Club headquarters ==
In August 2022 officials at the Adelaide Football Club announced the club would move its training and administrative headquarters away from Football Park in West Lakes to an expanded and redeveloped Thebarton Oval precinct. The club later received federal and state government funding of $30 million and a further $11 million from West Lakes Council to partially finance the project, which received planning approval in June 2024. The upgrade of Thebarton Oval includes a two-storey, 150-metre long building, which will wrap around part of the ground. Indoor and outdoor training facilities will be added for the club's AFL and AFLW teams, and a cafe and members lounge and function viewing centre will incorporate the club's museum. Broadcast-quality floodlights and additional seating will also be include in the upgrade. Construction of the facility commenced in February 2025.
