= 2016 AFL Women's draft =

Fourth women's draft organised by the Australian Football League

General information
- Date: 12 October 2016
- Time: 1.00 pm AEDT
- Location: NAB Building, Docklands, Victoria
- Network: afl.com.au
- Sponsored by: NAB

Overview
- League: AFL Women's
- First selection: Nicola Barr (Greater Western Sydney)

The 2016 AFL Women's draft consisted of the various periods when the eight clubs in the AFL Women's competition recruited players prior to the competition's inaugural season in 2017.

Draftees and signings over the period were required to have a minimum age qualification of 18. Prior to the draft itself each club was allowed to sign two marquee players from any state across the country at an increased salary. In addition, they were permitted to sign a number of priority players with existing connections to the club, and up to two rookie players who had not played competitive Australian rules football within the previous three years. All remaining players entered the draft and became eligible to be selected by any team based in their nominated state-based zone.

== Marquee signings ==
On 27 July 2016, each of the competition's eight teams announced their two marquee player signings allowed prior to the October draft.

Club	Marquee player	Previous club	Previous league
Adelaide	Chelsea Randall	Swan Districts	WAWFL
Adelaide	Kellie Gibson	Morphettville Park	SAWFL
Brisbane	Tayla Harris	Zillmere	QAWFL
Brisbane	Sabrina Frederick-Traub	South Fremantle	WAWFL
Carlton	Brianna Davey	St Kilda Sharks	VFL Women's
Carlton	Darcy Vescio	Darebin Falcons	VFL Women's
Collingwood	Moana Hope	St Kilda Sharks	VFL Women's
Collingwood	Emma King	Coastal Titans	WAWFL
Fremantle	Kara Donnellan	Swan Districts	WAWFL
Fremantle	Kiara Bowers	Coastal Titans	WAWFL
Greater Western Sydney	Renee Forth	Coastal Titans	WAWFL
Greater Western Sydney	Emma Swanson	East Fremantle	WAWFL
Melbourne	Daisy Pearce	Darebin Falcons	VFL Women's
Melbourne	Melissa Hickey	Darebin Falcons	VFL Women's
Western Bulldogs	Katie Brennan	Darebin Falcons	VFL Women's
Western Bulldogs	Ellie Blackburn	Melbourne University	VFL Women's

== Priority players ==
Under the priority selection rules, Carlton, Collingwood, Melbourne, the Western Bulldogs and Fremantle were allowed one player, Adelaide and Brisbane were allowed two players, and Greater Western Sydney was allowed four. Due to injuries to their marquee players, Fremantle and Greater Western Sydney were permitted an additional priority pick, allowing for two and five in total, respectively.

Club	Priority	Previous club	Previous league	Ref.
Adelaide	Courtney Cramey	Morphettville Park	SAWFL	
Adelaide	Ange Foley	Waratah	NTFL	
Brisbane	Emma Zielke	Coorparoo	QAWFL	
Brisbane	Kaitlyn Ashmore	Melbourne University	VFL Women's	
Carlton	Lauren Arnell	Darebin Falcons	VFL Women's	
Collingwood	Meg Hutchins	Eastern Devils	VFL Women's	
Fremantle	Kirby Bentley	Swan Districts	WAWFL	
Fremantle	Ebony Antonio	Swan Districts	WAWFL	
Greater Western Sydney	Maddy Collier	UNSW-Eastern Suburbs Stingrays	SWAFL	
Greater Western Sydney	Alex Williams	East Fremantle	WAWFL	
Greater Western Sydney	Louise Stephenson	Melbourne University	VFL Women's	
Greater Western Sydney	Phoebe McWilliams	St Kilda Sharks	VFL Women's	
Greater Western Sydney	Jessica Dal Pos	Darebin Falcons	VFL Women's	
Melbourne	Karen Paxman	Darebin Falcons	VFL Women's	
Western Bulldogs	Emma Kearney	Melbourne University	VFL Women's	

== Rookie players ==
Club	Rookie player	Other/former sport	Ref.
Adelaide	Erin Phillips	Basketball	
Adelaide	Jasmine Anderson	Soccer	
Brisbane	Kate Deegan	Soccer	
Brisbane	Delissa Kimmince	Cricket	
Carlton	Nat Exon	Soccer	
Carlton	Kate Shierlaw	Basketball/javelin	
Collingwood	Kate Sheahan	Tennis	
Collingwood	Helen Roden	Basketball	
Fremantle	Gabby O'Sullivan	Basketball	
Fremantle	Kim Mickle	Javelin	
Greater Western Sydney	Jessica Bibby	Basketball	
Greater Western Sydney	Ellie Brush	Soccer	
Melbourne	Cat Phillips	Ultimate frisbee	
Melbourne	Harriet Cordner	Soccer	
Western Bulldogs	Libby Birch	Netball	
Western Bulldogs	Romy Timmins	Basketball	

== Draft ==
A state based draft was held on 12 October 2016. The draft order was determined by random draw on 29 September. The draft operated in snake formation with the club holding the first selection of the first round also holding the last selection of the second round and so on and so forth.

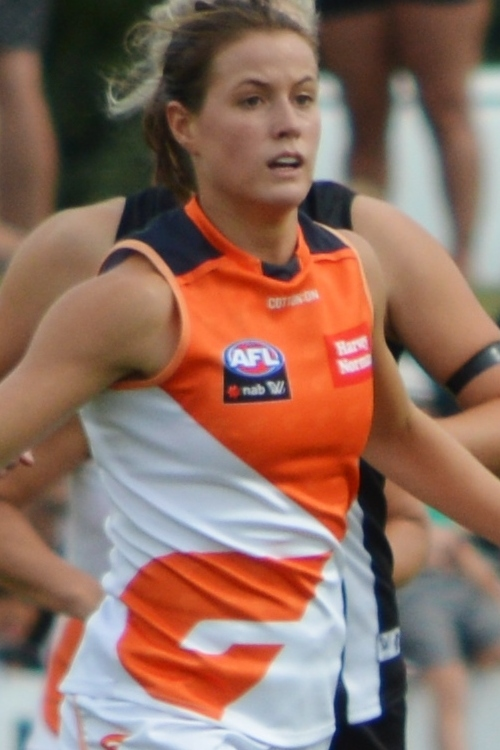
Nicola Barr was selected first by Greater Western Sydney

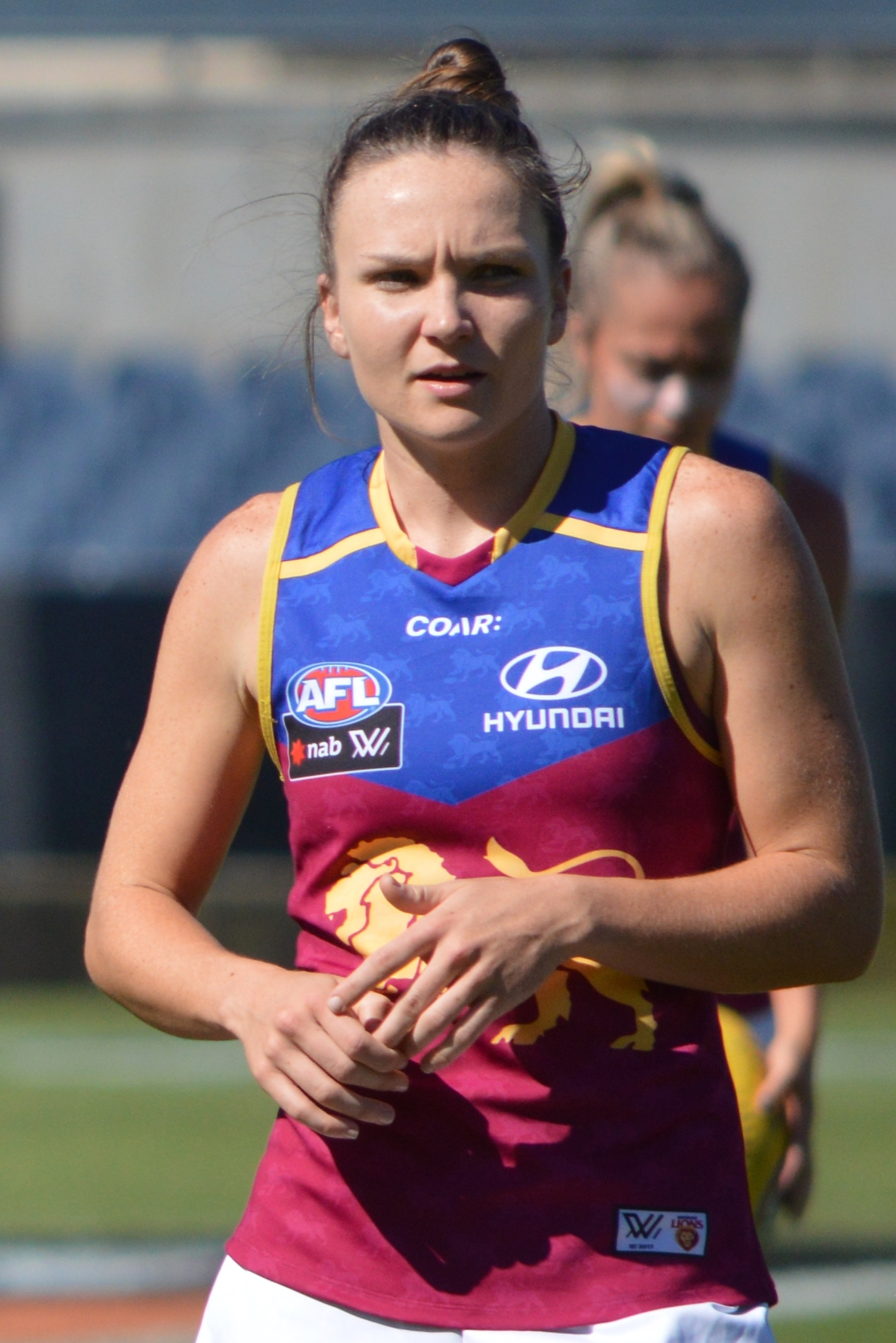
Emily Bates was selected second by the Brisbane Lions

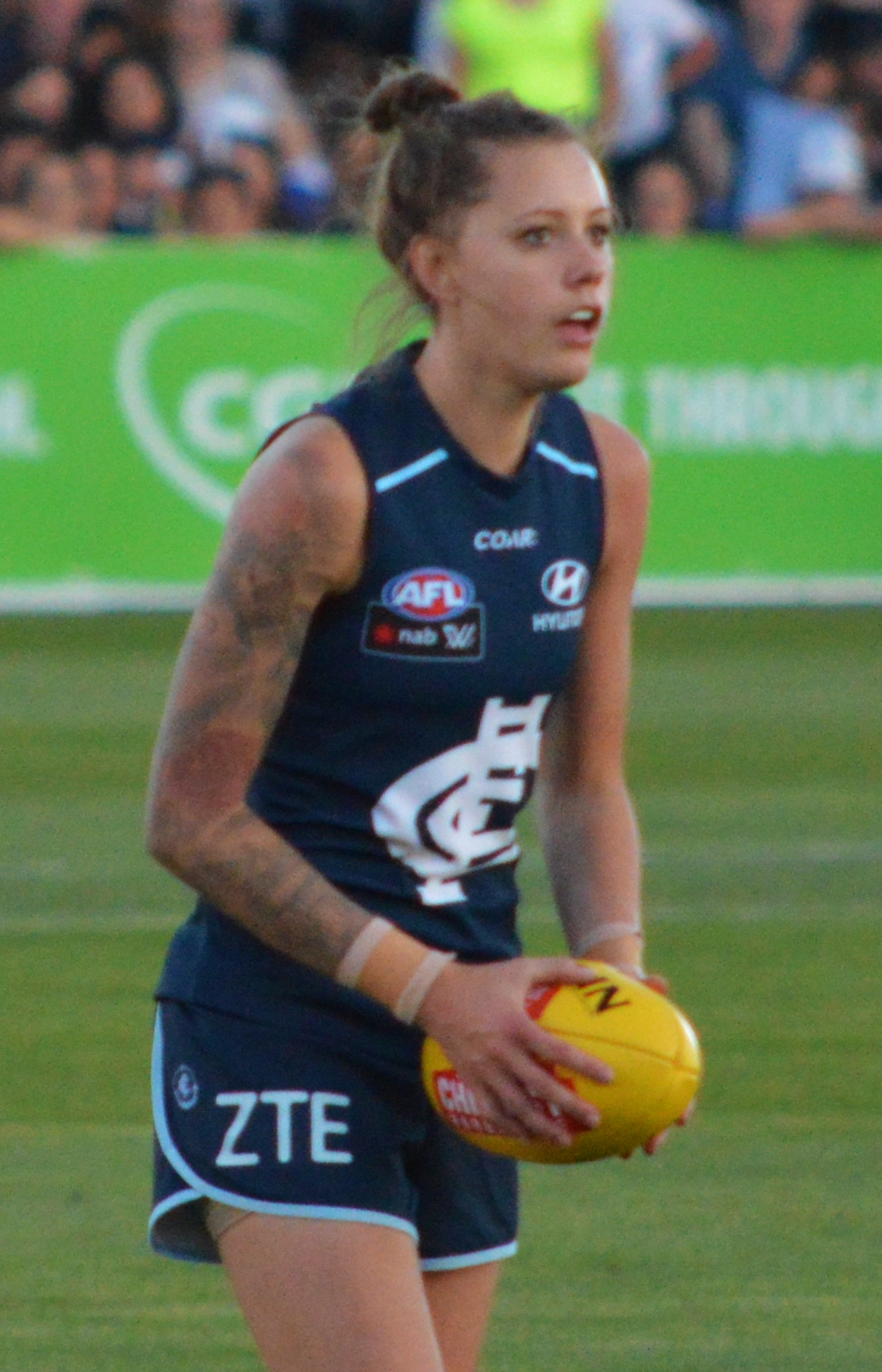
Bianca Jakobsson was selected third by the Carlton Football Club

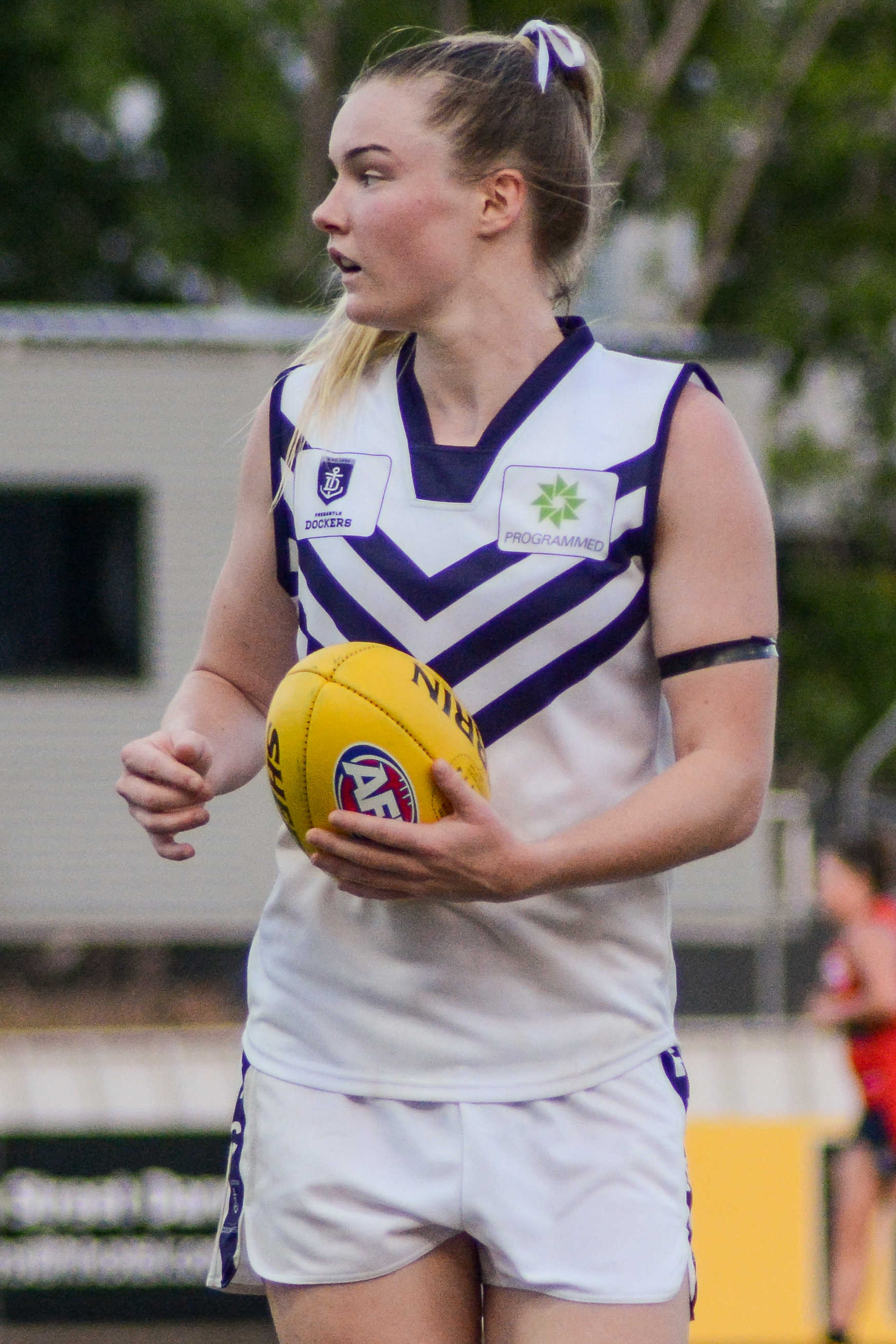
Hayley Miller was selected fourth by the Fremantle Football Club

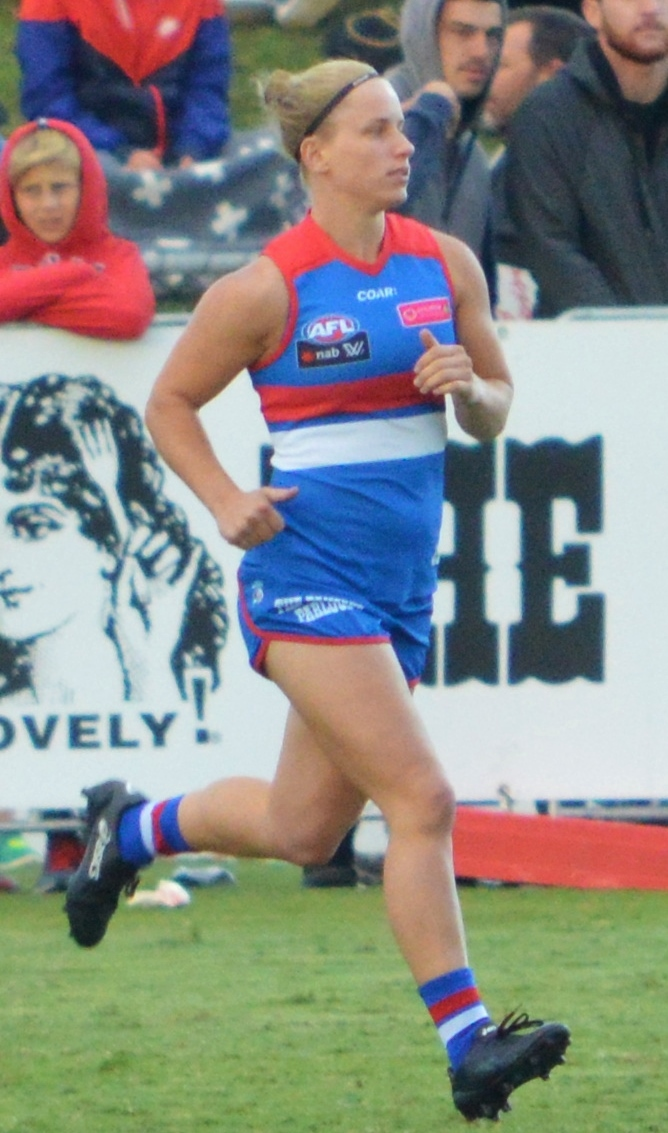
Jaimee Lambert was selected fifth by the Western Bulldogs

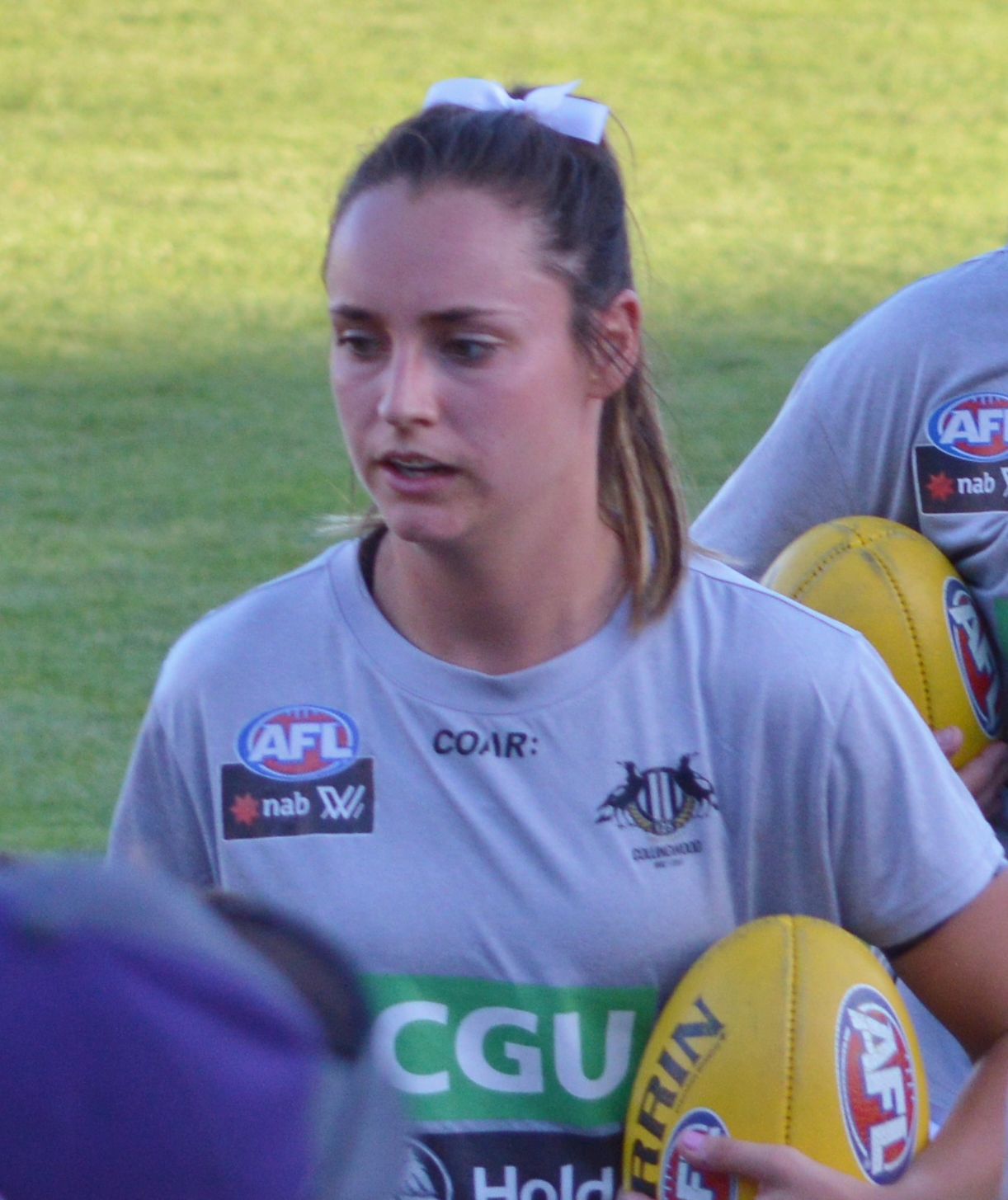
Nicola Stevens was selected sixth by the Collingwood Football Club

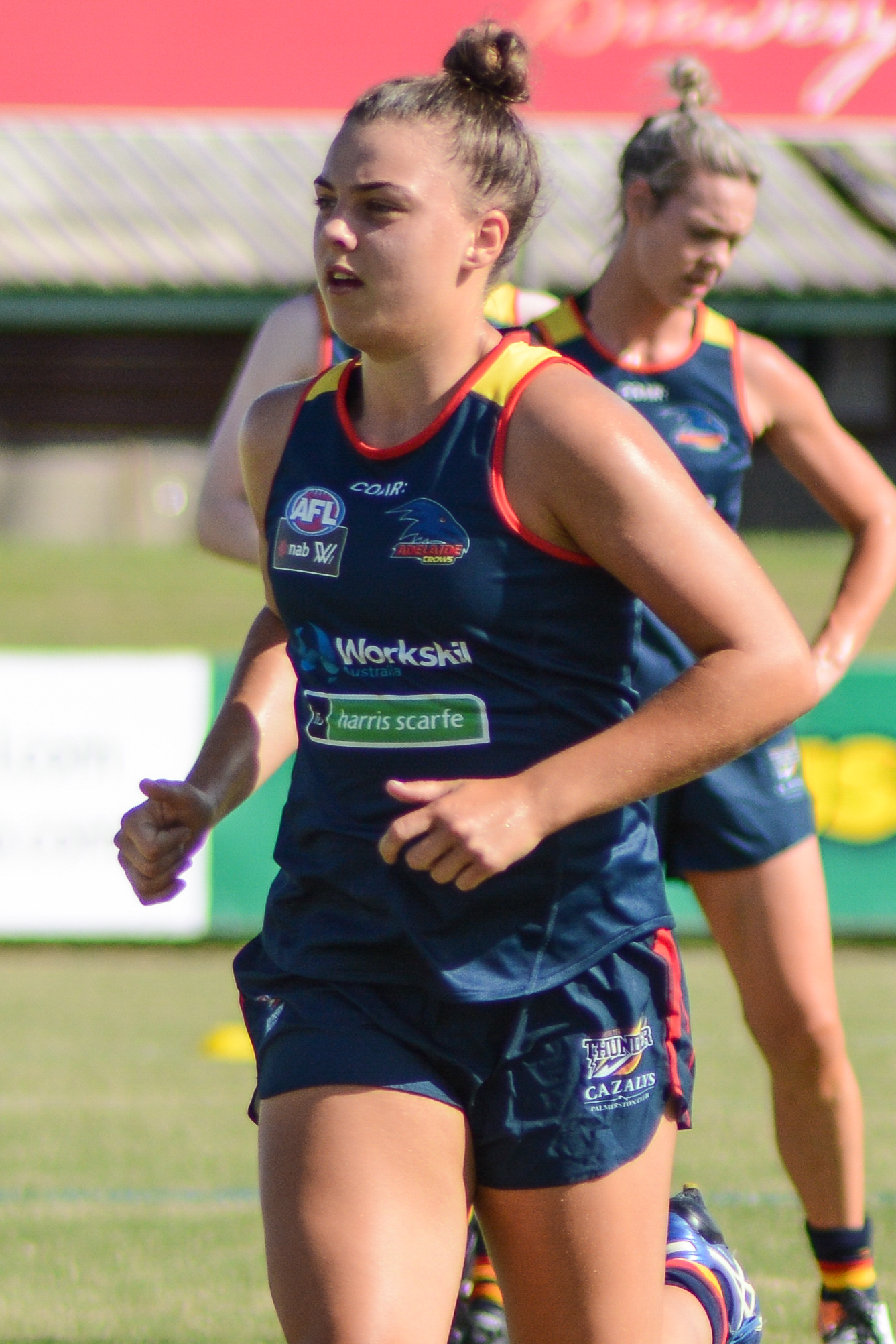
Ebony Marinoff was selected seventh by the Adelaide Football Club

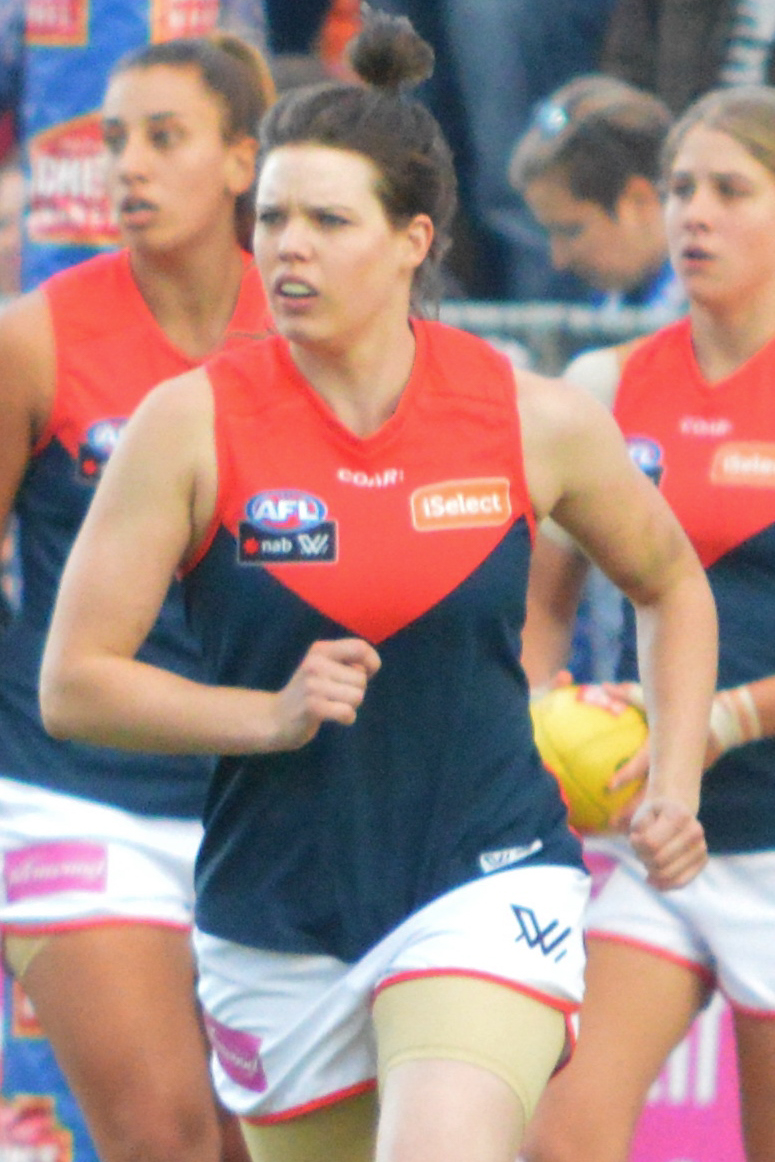
Elise O'Dea was selected eighth by the Melbourne Football Club

Round	Pick	Player	Drafted to	Recruited from	League
1	1	Nicola Barr	Greater Western Sydney	Sydney University	SWAFL
1	2	Emily Bates	Brisbane	Yeronga	QAWFL
1	3	Bianca Jakobsson	Carlton	Cranbourne	VFL Women's
1	4	Hayley Miller	Fremantle	Coastal Titans	WAWFL
1	5	Jaimee Lambert	Western Bulldogs	Eastern Devils	VFL Women's
1	6	Nicola Stevens	Collingwood	Melbourne University	VFL Women's
1	7	Ebony Marinoff	Adelaide	Morphettville Park	SAWFL
1	8	Elise O'Dea	Melbourne	Darebin Falcons	VFL Women's
2	9	Deanna Berry	Melbourne	Melbourne University	VFL Women's
2	10	Heather Anderson	Adelaide	Waratah	NTFL
2	11	Steph Chiocci	Collingwood	Diamond Creek	VFL Women's
2	12	Aasta O'Connor	Western Bulldogs	Darebin Falcons	VFL Women's
2	13	Brianna Green	Fremantle	East Fremantle	WAWFL
2	14	Kate Gillespie-Jones	Carlton	Seaford	VFL Women's
2	15	Tahlia Randall	Brisbane	Wilston Grange	QAWFL
2	16	Ashleigh Guest	Greater Western Sydney	VU Western Spurs	VFL Women's
3	17	Aimee Schmidt	Greater Western Sydney	Coastal Titans	WAWFL
3	18	Nicole Hildebrand	Brisbane	Melbourne University	VFL Women's
3	19	Sarah Hosking	Carlton	Seaford	VFL Women's
3	20	Ashley Sharp	Fremantle	Swan Districts	WAWFL
3	21	Hannah Scott	Western Bulldogs	Eastern Devils	VFL Women's
3	22	Sarah D'Arcy	Collingwood	Eastern Devils	VFL Women's
3	23	Jenna McCormick	Adelaide	Coorparoo	QAWFL
3	24	Richelle Cranston	Melbourne	Geelong	VWFL
4	25	Lauren Pearce	Melbourne	Darebin Falcons	VFL Women's
4	26	Deni Varnhagen	Adelaide	Morphettville Park	SAWFL
4	27	Brittany Bonnici	Collingwood	St Kilda Sharks	VFL Women's
4	28	Kirsten McLeod	Western Bulldogs	Cranbourne	VFL Women's
4	29	Lara Filocamo	Fremantle	Coastal Titans	WAWFL
4	30	Gab Pound	Carlton	Melbourne Uni	VFL Women's
4	31	Leah Kaslar	Brisbane	Coolangatta	QAWFL
4	32	Rebecca Beeson	Greater Western Sydney	University NSW	SWAFL
5	33	Kate Stanton	Greater Western Sydney	Wollongong	SWAFL
5	34	Jess Wuetschner	Brisbane	East Fremantle	WAWFL
5	35	Danielle Hardiman	Carlton	Cranbourne	VFL Women's
5	36	Tiah Haynes	Fremantle	Coastal Titans	WAWFL
5	37	Kimberley Ebb	Western Bulldogs	Seaford	VFL Women's
5	38	Bree White	Collingwood	VU Western Spurs	VFL Women's
5	39	Sally Riley	Adelaide	Tracy Village	NTFL
5	40	Alyssa Mifsud	Melbourne	VU Western Spurs	VFL Women's
6	41	Shelley Scott	Melbourne	VU Western Spurs	VFL Women's
6	42	Georgia Bevan	Adelaide	Morphettville Park	SAWFL
6	43	Caitlyn Edwards	Collingwood	East Fremantle	WAWFL
6	44	Hayley Wildes	Western Bulldogs	Cranbourne	VFL Women's
6	45	Kira Phillips	Fremantle	Peel Thunder	WAWFL
6	46	Shae Audley	Carlton	Diamond Creek	VFL Women's
6	47	Ally Anderson	Brisbane	Zillmere	QAWFL
6	48	Erin McKinnon	Greater Western Sydney	Mosman Swans	SWAFL
7	49	Mai Nguyen	Greater Western Sydney	University NSW	SWAFL
7	50	Breanna Koenen	Brisbane	University of Queensland	QAWFL
7	51	Bella Ayre	Carlton	Bendigo	VFL Women's
7	52	Tayla Bresland	Fremantle	Peel Thunder	WAWFL
7	53	Brooke Lochland	Western Bulldogs	Melbourne University	VFL Women's
7	54	Alicia Eva	Collingwood	Melbourne University	VFL Women's
7	55	Sophie Armitstead	Adelaide	Wanderers	NTFL
7	56	Katherine Smith	Melbourne	Eastern Devils	VFL Women's
8	57	Emma Humphries	Melbourne	Burnie Dockers	TFL
8	58	Talia Radan	Adelaide	Belconnen	AFL Canberra
8	59	Amelia Barden	Collingwood	Diamond Creek	VFL Women's
8	60	Bailey Hunt	Western Bulldogs	Melbourne University	VFL Women's
8	61	Amy Lavell	Fremantle	Coastal Titans	WAWFL
8	62	Lauren Brazzale	Carlton	Diamond Creek	VFL Women's
8	63	Megan Hunt	Brisbane	University of Queensland	QAWFL
8	64	Amanda Farrugia	Greater Western Sydney	Macquarie Uni	SWAFL
9	65	Jacinda Barclay	Greater Western Sydney	University NSW	SWAFL
9	66	Sam Virgo	Brisbane	University of Queensland	QAWFL
9	67	Breann Moody	Carlton	Cranbourne	VFL Women's
9	68	Stacey Barr	Fremantle	Swan Districts	WAWFL
9	69	Ellyse Gamble	Western Bulldogs	Burnie Dockers	TFL
9	70	Stacey Livingstone	Collingwood	Port Melbourne Colts	VWFL
9	71	Rachael Killian	Adelaide	West Adelaide	SAWFL
9	72	Stephanie De Bortoli	Melbourne	Diamond Creek	VFL Women's
10	73	Lily Mithen	Melbourne	North Geelong	GDFL
10	74	Rhiannon Metcalfe	Adelaide	Gungahlin	AFL Canberra
10	75	Jess Cameron	Collingwood	Diamond Creek	VFL Women's
10	76	Lauren Spark	Western Bulldogs	Melbourne University	VFL Women's
10	77	Melissa Caulfield	Fremantle	East Fremantle	WAWFL
10	78	Jess Hosking	Carlton	Seaford	VFL Women's
10	79	Kate Lutkins	Brisbane	Wilston Grange	QAWFL
10	80	Britt Tully	Greater Western Sydney	Gungahlin	AFL Canberra
11	81	Kristy De Pellegrini	Greater Western Sydney	Southern Power	SWAFL
11	82	Kate McCarthy	Brisbane	Yeronga	QAWFL
11	83	Natalie Plane	Carlton	Seaford	VFL Women's
11	84	Cassie Davidson	Fremantle	East Fremantle	WAWFL
11	85	Nicole Callinan	Western Bulldogs	Darebin Falcons	VFL Women's
11	86	Jasmine Garner	Collingwood	St Kilda Sharks	VFL Women's
11	87	Anne Hatchard	Adelaide	Morphettville Park	SAWFL
11	88	Ainslie Kemp	Melbourne	VU Western Spurs	VFL Women's
12	89	Mia-Rae Clifford	Melbourne	St Kilda Sharks	VFL Women's
12	90	Tayla Thorn	Adelaide	St Mary's	NTFL
12	91	Emma Grant	Collingwood	Bendigo	VWFL
12	92	Lisa Williams	Western Bulldogs	Diamond Creek	VFL Women's
12	93	Taylah Angel	Fremantle	Swan Districts	WAWFL
12	94	Sarah Last	Carlton	Bendigo	VWFL
12	95	Shaleise Law	Brisbane	Zillmere	QAWFL
12	96	Renee Tomkins	Greater Western Sydney	University NSW	SWAFL
13	97	Clare Lawton	Greater Western Sydney	Army 3rd Brigade	
13	98	Selina Goodman	Brisbane	Coolangatta	QAWFL
13	99	Tilly Lucas-Rodd	Carlton	St Kilda Sharks	VFL Women's
13	100	Belinda Smith	Fremantle	East Fremantle	WAWFL
13	101	Lauren Morecroft	Western Bulldogs	Diamond Creek	VFL Women's
13	102	Penny Cula-Reid	Collingwood	St Kilda Sharks	VFL Women's
13	103	Abbey Holmes	Adelaide	Waratah	NTFL
13	104	Brooke Patterson	Melbourne	Darebin Falcons	VFL Women's
14	105	Jessica Anderson	Melbourne	Melbourne University	VFL Women's
14	106	Stevie-Lee Thompson	Adelaide	Wanderers	NTFL
14	107	Lauren Tesoriero	Collingwood	Eastern Devils	VFL Women's
14	108	Tiarna Ernst	Western Bulldogs	Diamond Creek	VFL Women's
14	109	Stephanie Cain	Fremantle	Swan Districts	WAWFL
14	110	Katie Loynes	Carlton	Diamond Creek	VFL Women's
14	111	Sharni Webb	Brisbane	University of Queensland	QAWFL
14	112	Ella Ross	Greater Western Sydney	Queanbeyan	AFL Canberra
15	113	Stephanie Walker	Greater Western Sydney	Sydney University	SWAFL
15	114	Nikki Wallace	Brisbane	Coolangatta	QAWFL
15	115	Madeline Keryk	Carlton	Melbourne University	VFL Women's
15	116	Kelly Clinch	Fremantle	Subiaco	WAWFL
15	117	Kate Tyndall	Western Bulldogs	Diamond Creek	VFL Women's
15	118	Melissa Kuys	Collingwood	Knox	VFL Women's
15	119	Jess Sedunary	Adelaide	Morphettville Park	SAWFL
15	120	Maddie Boyd	Melbourne	North Geelong	GDFL
16	121	Pepa Randall	Melbourne	Eastern Devils	VFL Women's
16	122	Sarah Allan	Adelaide	Salisbury	SAWFL
16	123	Cecilia McIntosh	Collingwood	Melbourne Uni	VFL Women's
16	124	Courtney Clarkson	Western Bulldogs	Cranbourne	VFL Women's
16	125	Demi Okely	Fremantle	Peel Thunder	WAWFL
16	126	Kate Darby	Carlton	Victoria	
16	127	Jamie Stanton	Brisbane	Coolangatta	QAWFL
17	128	Jade Ransfield	Brisbane	Yeronga	QAWFL
17	129	Alison Downie	Carlton	Diamond Creek	VFL Women's
17	130	Dana Hooker	Fremantle	Coastal Titans	WAWFL
17	131	Jess Gardner	Western Bulldogs	St Kilda Sharks	VFL Women's
17	132	Christina Bernardi	Collingwood	Diamond Creek	VFL Women's
17	133	Justine Mules	Adelaide	Morphettville Park	SAWFL
17	134	Sarah Lampard	Melbourne	VU Western Spurs	VFL Women's
18	135	Jasmine Grierson	Melbourne	Cranbourne	VFL Women's
18	136	Monique Hollick	Adelaide	University NSW	SWAFL
18	137	Ruby Schleicher	Collingwood	East Fremantle	WAWFL
18	138	Kirsty Lamb	Western Bulldogs	Diamond Creek	VFL Women's
18	139	Akec Makur Chuot	Fremantle	Swan Districts	WAWFL
18	140	Laura Attard	Carlton	Diamond Creek	VFL Women's
18	141	Brittany Gibson	Brisbane	Burnie Dockers	TFL
19	142	Rebecca Privitelli	Carlton	Eastern Devils	VFL Women's
19	143	Laura Bailey	Western Bulldogs	St Kilda Sharks	VFL Women's
19	144	Tara Morgan	Collingwood	South Fremantle	WAWFL
19	145	Sarah Jolly	Melbourne	Gippsland Galaxy	VWFL

== Free agents ==
Each team had until 31 October 2016 to sign further undrafted/free-agent players to complete their list of 25 senior listed players.

Club	Player	Previous club	Previous league	Ref.
Adelaide	Lauren O'Shea	Waratah	NTFL	
Adelaide	Sarah Perkins	Eastern Devils	VFL Women's	
Adelaide	Dayna Cox	Morphettville Park	SAWFL	
Brisbane	Caitlin Collins	Yeronga	QAWFL	
Brisbane	Shannon Campbell	Wilston Grange	QAWFL	
Brisbane	Jordan Membrey	Coolangatta	QAWFL	
Carlton	Jess Kennedy	Bendigo	VFL Women's	
Carlton	Hayley Trevean	Bendigo	VFL Women's	
Carlton	Alison Brown	St Kilda Sharks	VFL Women's	
Collingwood	Kendra Heil	Eastern Devils	VFL Women's	
Collingwood	Lou Wotton	Eastern Devils	VWFL	
Collingwood	Sophie Casey	Eastern Devils	VFL Women's	
Collingwood	Georgia Walker	Seaford	VFL Women's	
Fremantle	Tarnica Golisano	Coastal Titans	WAWFL	
Fremantle	Taryn Priestly	Swan Districts	WAWFL	
Fremantle	Gemma Houghton	—	—	
Fremantle	Emily Bonser	Swan Districts	WAWFL	
Greater Western Sydney	Codie Briggs	Sydney University	SWAFL	
Greater Western Sydney	Isabella Rudolph	Newtown Breakaways	SWAFL	
Greater Western Sydney	Hannah Wallett	Belconnen	AFL Canberra	
Greater Western Sydney	Alex Saundry	Melbourne University	VFL Women's	
Melbourne	Meg Downie	St Kilda Sharks	VFL Women's	
Melbourne	Laura Duryea	Diamond Creek	VFL Women's	
Melbourne	Aliesha Newman	—	—	
Western Bulldogs	Rebecca Neaves	St Kilda Sharks	VFL Women's	
Western Bulldogs	Meg McDonald	Darebin Falcons	VFL Women's	
Western Bulldogs	Angelica Gogos	Melbourne University	VFL Women's	

== See also ==
- 2016 AFL draft
