= Stephanie Walker =

Australian rules footballer (born 1994)

Personal information
- Born: 28 February 1994 (age 32)
- Original team: Sydney University (SWAFL)
- Draft: No. 113, 2016 AFL Women's draft
- Debut: Round 2, 2017, Greater Western Sydney vs. Carlton, at Ikon Park
- Height: 161 cm (5 ft 3 in)
- Position: Forward

Playing career^{1}
Years	Club	Games (Goals)
2017	Greater Western Sydney	3 (1)
- ^{1} Playing statistics correct to the end of 2017.

Stephanie Walker (born 28 February 1994) is an Australian rules footballer who played for the Greater Western Sydney Giants in the AFL Women's competition. Walker was drafted by Greater Western Sydney with their 15th selection and 113th overall in the 2016 AFL Women's draft. She made her debut in the thirteen point loss to Carlton at Ikon Park in round two of the 2017 season. She played three matches in her debut season. She was delisted at the end of the 2017 season. In 2019, Walker will play for the Eagles in the SANFLW competition.
