= Codie Briggs =

Australian rules footballer

Personal information
- Born: 7 October 1990 (age 36); Shepparton, Victoria
- Original team: Newtown Breakaway (SWAFL)
- Debut: Round 1, 2017, Greater Western Sydney vs. Adelaide, at Thebarton Oval
- Height: 162 cm (5 ft 4 in)
- Position: Forward

Playing career^{1}
Years	Club	Games (Goals)
2017	Greater Western Sydney	3 (0)
- ^{1} Playing statistics correct to the end of 2017.

Codie Briggs (born 7 October 1990) is an Australian rules footballer who played for the Greater Western Sydney Giants in the AFL Women's competition. Briggs was recruited by Greater Western Sydney as a free agent in October 2016. She made her debut in the thirty-six point loss to Adelaide at Thebarton Oval in the opening round of the 2017 season. She played three matches in her debut season. She was delisted at the end of the 2017 season and choose to pursue her career as a Pastry Chef
