= Kristy De Pellegrini =

Australian rules footballer

Personal information
- Born: 8 May 1990 (age 36)
- Original team: Southern Power (SWAFL)
- Draft: No. 81, 2016 AFL Women's draft
- Debut: Round 1, 2017, Greater Western Sydney vs. Adelaide, at Thebarton Oval
- Height: 172 cm (5 ft 8 in)
- Position: Defender

Playing career^{1}
Years	Club	Games (Goals)
2017	Greater Western Sydney	6 (0)
- ^{1} Playing statistics correct to the end of 2017.

Kristy De Pellegrini (born 8 May 1990) is an Australian rules footballer who played for the Greater Western Sydney Giants in the AFL Women's competition. De Pellegrini was drafted by Greater Western Sydney with their eleventh selection and eighty-first overall in the 2016 AFL Women's draft. She made her debut in the thirty-six point loss to Adelaide at Thebarton Oval in the opening round of the 2017 season. She played six matches in her debut season. She was delisted at the end of the 2017 season.
