= Mai Nguyen =

Australian rules footballer (born 1990)

Personal information
- Born: 16 June 1990 (age 36)
- Original team: University NSW (SWAFL)
- Draft: No. 49, 2016 AFL Women's draft
- Debut: Round 2, 2017, Greater Western Sydney vs. Carlton, at Ikon Park
- Height: 162 cm (5 ft 4 in)
- Position: Defender / midfielder

Playing career^{1}
| Years | Club | Games (Goals) |
| 2017 | Greater Western Sydney | 3 (1) |
- ^{1} Playing statistics correct to the end of 2017.

Mai Nguyen (born 16 June 1990) is an Australian rules footballer who played for the Greater Western Sydney Giants in the AFL Women's competition. Nguyen was drafted by Greater Western Sydney with their seventh selection and forty-ninth overall in the 2016 AFL Women's draft. She made her debut in the thirteen point loss to Carlton at Ikon Park in round two of the 2017 season. She played three matches in her debut season, which ended early due to a ruptured ACL. She was delisted at the end of the 2017 season.
