= Isabella Rudolph =

Australian rules footballer (born 1995)

Personal information
- Born: 21 April 1995 (age 31)
- Original team: Newtown Breakaways (SWAFL)
- Debut: Round 7, 2017, Greater Western Sydney vs. Western Bulldogs, at UNSW Canberra Oval
- Height: 160 cm (5 ft 3 in)
- Position: Forward

Playing career^{1}
Years	Club	Games (Goals)
2017	Greater Western Sydney	1 (0)
- ^{1} Playing statistics correct to the end of 2017.

Isabella Rudolph (born 21 April 1995) is an Australian rules footballer who played for the Greater Western Sydney Giants in the AFL Women's competition. Rudolph was recruited by Greater Western Sydney as a free agent in October 2016. She made her debut in the thirty-two point loss to the Western Bulldogs at UNSW Canberra Oval in round seven of the 2017 season. It was her only match for the season. She was delisted at the end of the 2017 season.
