= Nicola Barr =

Australian rules footballer

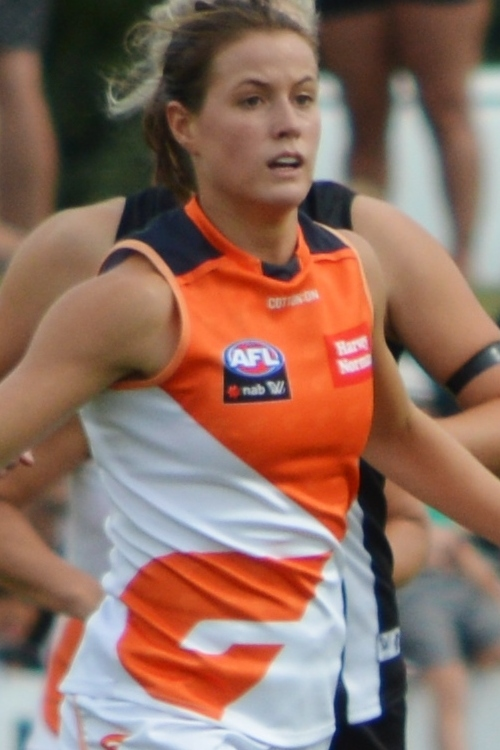
- Barr playing for Greater Western Sydney in February 2018

Personal information
- Nickname: Bumper
- Born: 13 June 1996 (age 30); Melbourne, Victoria
- Original team: Sydney University (SWAFL)
- Draft: No. 1, 2016 AFL Women's draft
- Debut: Round 1, 2017, Greater Western Sydney vs. Adelaide, at Thebarton Oval
- Height: 168 cm (5 ft 6 in)
- Position: Midfielder

Club information
- Current club: St Kilda
- Number: 17

Playing career^{1}
Years	Club	Games (Goals)
2017–2024	Greater Western Sydney	61 (10)
2025–	St Kilda	14 (0)
Total		75 (10)
- ^{1} Playing statistics correct to the end of the 2026 season.

Career highlights
- SWAFL best and fairest (2016); SWAFL Rising Star (2015)

Nicola Barr (born 13 June 1996) is an Australian rules footballer playing for St Kilda in the AFL Women's competition.

== Early life ==
Barr was born in Melbourne but spent most of her early years living outside of Australia. Barr's family settled in Sydney when she was 14. She began playing football while in year ten at Queenwood on Sydney's North Shore.

She was selected to play in the AFL youth girls national competition in 2014.

Barr played soccer at an elite level as a junior.

== Amateur career ==
Barr played state-league football with North Shore in the Sydney Women's AFL (SWAFL).

In 2016, Barr won the league's Rising Star award as the best young player in the league. The following season she won the Mostyn Medal as the best and fairest player in the SWAFL.

Barr represented the Sydney Swans academy in an AFL exhibition match in April 2016, winning best on ground honours.

== AFL Women's career ==
Barr was drafted by Greater Western Sydney with the first overall selection in the 2016 AFL Women's draft. She played in all seven games, and was nominated for the AFL Women's Rising Star award after moving from midfield to half back late in the season.

Greater Western Sydney signed Barr for the 2018 season during the trade period in May 2017.

Barr became the first player in AFL Women's history to be sent directly to the AFL Tribunal owing to an incident involving North Melbourne's Ashleigh Riddell during the round two, 2019 match between Greater Western Sydney and North Melbourne played at Drummoyne Oval. She was suspended for one match.

Barr played 61 games over nine seasons for the Giants.

A hamstring injury limited game time for Barr in 2024. At the conclusion of the 2024 season, Barr signed a three-year deal with St Kilda, with the Executive General Manager of St Kilda's AFLW describing Barr as “a figurehead for football in NSW" and a "proven leader on and off the field."

== Statistics ==
Statistics are correct to the end of the 2024 season

Legend
G	Goals	K	Kicks	D	Disposals	T	Tackles
B	Behinds	H	Handballs	M	Marks

Season	Team	No.	Games	Totals							Averages (per game)						
Season	Team	No.	Games	G	B	K	H	D	M	T	G	B	K	H	D	M	T
2017	Greater Western Sydney	8	7	0	0	55	23	78	10	22	0.0	0.0	7.9	3.3	11.1	1.4	3.1
2018	Greater Western Sydney	8	7	0	0	48	23	71	12	22	0.0	0.0	6.9	3.3	10.1	1.7	3.1
2019	Greater Western Sydney	8	5	0	0	29	11	40	6	17	0.0	0.0	5.8	2.2	8	1.2	3.4
2020	Greater Western Sydney	8	5	0	2	34	15	49	11	5	0.0	0.4	6.8	3	9.8	2.2	1
2021	Greater Western Sydney	8	6	0	1	42	20	62	19	18	0.0	0.2	7	3.3	10.3	3.2	3
2022 (S6)	Greater Western Sydney	8	10	5	2	58	38	96	20	22	0.5	0.3	7.3	4.8	12	2.5	2.8
2022 (S7)	Greater Western Sydney	8	8	4	1	75	54	129	25	30	0.5	0.1	7.5	5.4	12.9	2.5	3
2023	Greater Western Sydney	8	10	1	1	87	84	171	21	60	0.1	0.1	8.7	8.4	17.1	2.1	6
2024	Greater Western Sydney	8	3	0	0	26	30	56	12	7	0.0	0.0	8.7	10	18.7	4	2.3
Career			61	10	7	454	298	752	136	203	0.1	0.1	7.4	4.9	12.2	2.3	3.1

== Personal life ==
Barr studies medical science at the University of Sydney. She has been dating Lloyd Perris since 2018.
