= Kate Stanton =

Australian rules footballer (born 1998)

Personal information
- Full name: Catherine Stanton
- Born: 8 October 1998 (age 28); Wodonga
- Original team: Wollongong (SWAFL)
- Draft: No. 33, 2016 AFL Women's draft
- Debut: Round 1, 2017, Greater Western Sydney vs. Adelaide, at Thebarton Oval
- Height: 172 cm (5 ft 8 in)
- Position: Forward

Club information
- Current club: Wollongong Saints

Playing career^{1}
Years	Club	Games (Goals)
2017	Greater Western Sydney	4 (1)
- ^{1} Playing statistics correct to the end of 2017.

Kate Stanton (born 8 October 1998) is an Australian rules footballer who played for the Greater Western Sydney Giants in the AFL Women's competition. Stanton was drafted by Greater Western Sydney with their fifth selection and thirty-third overall in the 2016 AFL Women's draft. She made her debut in the thirty-six point loss to Adelaide at Thebarton Oval in the opening round of the 2017 season. She played four matches in her debut season and kicked one goal. She was delisted at the end of the 2017 season.
