= Tara Morgan =

Australian rules footballer (born 1989)

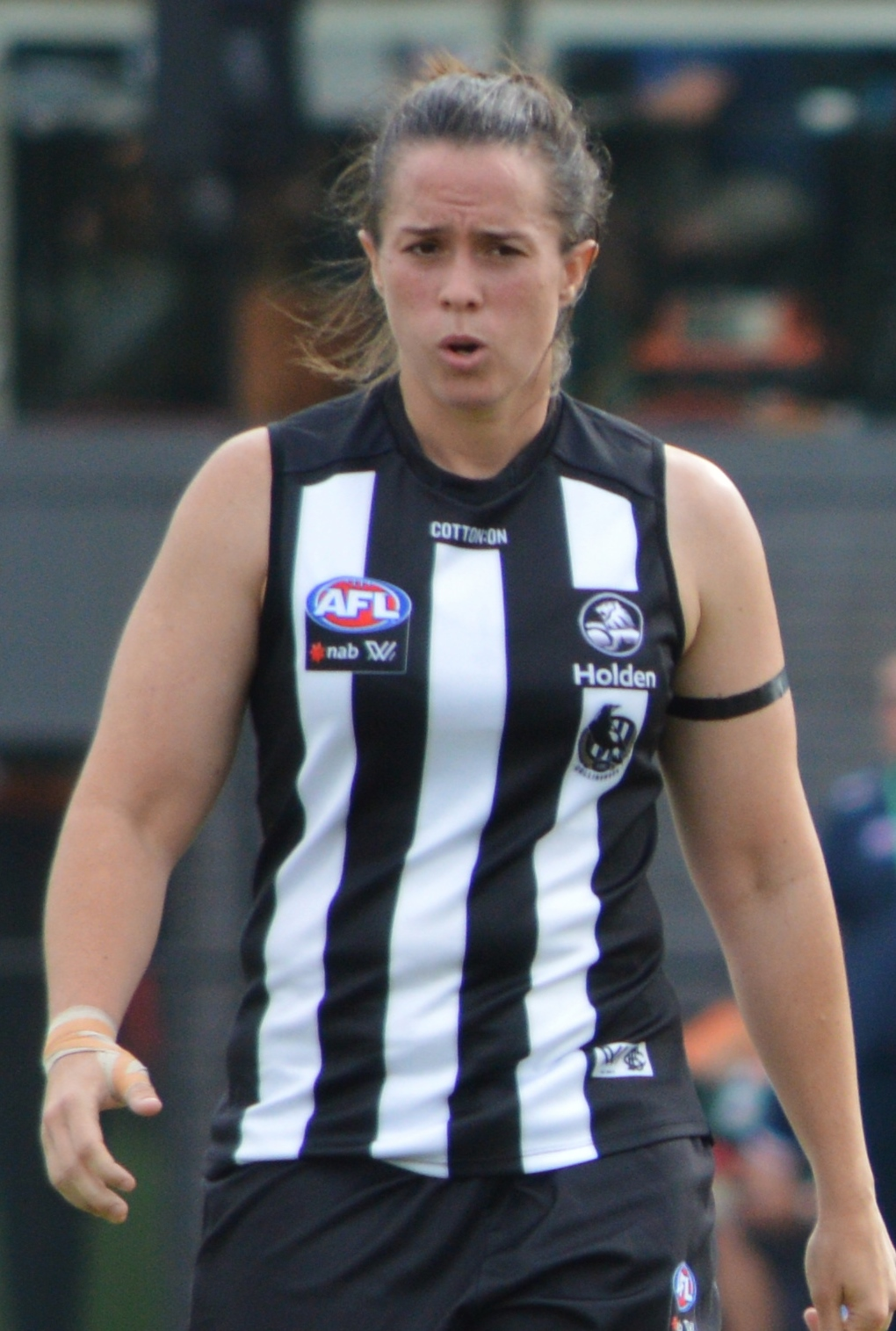
- Morgan playing for Collingwood in February 2018

Personal information
- Full name: Tara Morgan
- Born: 5 January 1989 (age 37); Kununurra, Western Australia
- Original team: South Fremantle (WAWFL)
- Draft: No. 144, 2016 national draft
- Debut: Round 1, 2017, Collingwood vs. Carlton, at IKON Park
- Height: 168 cm (5 ft 6 in)
- Position: Half-back

Playing career^{1}
Years	Club	Games (Goals)
2017–2018	Collingwood	11 (0)
- ^{1} Playing statistics correct to the end of the 2018 season.

Tara Morgan (born 16 May 1989) is an Australian rules footballer who last played for Collingwood in the AFL Women's (AFLW).

== Early life and state football ==
Morgan was raised in the Western Australia region of Kimberley in Kununurra, moving to Broome at the age of 11. In 2009 she joined WAWFL club South Fremantle. She started out playing as a forward, but moved to the back-line due to a player shortage and stayed there, playing as a half-back. She captained the club and won the best and fairest in the 2016 season. Despite her club success, she missed out on selection at state level and for the annual exhibition matches on several occasions.

In 2019 Morgan returned to local football, taking on the captaincy of the VU Western Spurs in the first division of the Northern Football Netball League.

== AFL Women's career ==
Morgan was selected by Collingwood with pick 144, joining 22 other West Australians drafted in the inaugural AFL Women's draft. She made her debut in round 1, 2017, in the inaugural AFLW match at IKON Park against Carlton. During the season she was roommates with fellow West Australian teammate Caitlyn Edwards.

Collingwood re-signed Morgan for the 2018 season during the trade period in May 2017.

In June 2018, Morgan was delisted by Collingwood.

== Statistics ==
Statistics are correct to the end of the 2018 season.

Legend
G	Goals	K	Kicks	D	Disposals	T	Tackles
B	Behinds	H	Handballs	M	Marks

Season	Team	No.	Games	Totals							Averages (per game)						
Season	Team	No.	Games	G	B	K	H	D	M	T	G	B	K	H	D	M	T
2017	Collingwood	26	7	0	0	29	8	37	11	20	0.0	0.0	4.1	1.1	5.3	1.6	2.9
2018	Collingwood	26	4	0	0	21	5	26	8	4	0.0	0.0	5.3	1.3	6.5	2.0	1.0
Career			11	0	0	50	13	63	19	24	0.0	0.0	4.5	1.2	5.7	1.7	2.2
