= Nicole Wallace =

Nikki, Nicolle or Nicole Wallace may refer to:

- Nicolle Wallace (born 1972), American TV political host and novelist
- Nikki Wallace (born 1994), Australian rules footballer for Brisbane Lions
- Nicole Wallace (actress) (born 2002), Spanish actress and singer
- Nicole Wallace (Law & Order: Criminal Intent), TV character in 2000s and 2010s
