= Jordan Membrey =

Australian rules footballer (born 1996)

Personal information
- Full name: Jordan Membrey
- Born: 1 January 1996 (age 30); Carlton, Victoria
- Original team: Coolangatta Tweed Heads (QWAFL)
- Draft: Free agent, 2016; No. 51, 2018 AFL Women's draft
- Debut: Round 4, 2017, Brisbane vs. Greater Western Sydney, at South Pine Sports Complex
- Height: 168 cm (5 ft 6 in)
- Position: Midfielder / Forward

Club information
- Current club: Gold Coast
- Number: 21

Playing career^{1}
| Years | Club | Games (Goals) |
| 2017 | Brisbane | 5 (1) |
| 2019–2022 (S7) | Collingwood | 23 (13) |
| 2023–2024 | Gold Coast | 11 (5) |
| Total | | 39 (19) |
- ^{1} Playing statistics correct to the end of the 2023 season.

Career highlights
- Collingwood leading goalkicker: 2020

Jordan Membrey (born 1 January 1996) is a former Australian rules footballer who played for the Gold Coast, Brisbane and Collingwood in the AFL Women's.

== Early life ==
Membrey was born in Carlton, Victoria in 1996 and moved with her family to the Gold Coast at the age of 8. Her initial sporting interests included netball and touch rugby, but later took up Australian rules football for the first time at the age of 15 with the Carrara Saints in the local Gold Coast competition. She transitioned to the Coolangatta-Tweed Heads Bluebirds and was drafted by the Brisbane Lions in 2016. She attended Trinity College, Beenleigh throughout her upbringing.

== AFLW career ==
Membrey was recruited by Brisbane as a free agent before the 2017 season. She made her debut in the Lions' round 4 game against Greater Western Sydney at the South Pine Sports Complex on 25 February 2017.

Membrey was delisted by Brisbane at the end of the 2017 season.

She would then get a second chance in the AFLW after Collingwood drafted Membrey with the 51st pick in the 2018 AFL Women's draft. At the end of the season, she was delisted by Collingwood.

After a season with Hawthorn in the VFL Women's, Collingwood re-drafted Membrey with the 74th pick of the 2019 AFL Women's draft.

In March 2023, Membrey was part of a five club trade, which involved her returning home to Queensland and joining the Gold Coast, while Collingwood received pick #14.

In November 2024, Membrey was delisted by the Gold Coast after playing 11 games across the 2023 and 2024 AFLW seasons for the Suns.

== Statistics ==
Statistics are correct to the end of the 2022 (S7) season.

Legend
| G | Goals | K | Kicks | D | Disposals | T | Tackles |
| B | Behinds | H | Handballs | M | Marks |

| Season | Team | No. | Games | Totals | | | | | | | Averages (per game) | | | | | | |
| Season | Team | No. | Games | G | B | K | H | D | M | T | G | B | K | H | D | M | T |
|---|---|---|---|---|---|---|---|---|---|---|---|---|---|---|---|---|---|
| 2017 | Brisbane | 27 | 5 | 1 | 0 | 8 | 8 | 16 | 3 | 8 | 0.2 | 0.0 | 1.6 | 1.6 | 3.2 | 0.6 | 1.6 |
| 2019 | Collingwood | 31 | 3 | 2 | 0 | 6 | 6 | 12 | 7 | 6 | 0.7 | 0.0 | 2.0 | 2.0 | 4.0 | 2.3 | 2.0 |
| 2020 | Collingwood | 21 | 7 | 7 | 0 | 38 | 19 | 57 | 19 | 19 | 1.0 | 0.0 | 5.4 | 2.7 | 8.1 | 2.7 | 2.7 |
| 2021 | Collingwood | 21 | 3 | 1 | 0 | 11 | 6 | 17 | 8 | 2 | 0.3 | 0.0 | 3.7 | 2.0 | 5.7 | 2.7 | 0.7 |
| 2022 (S6) | Collingwood | 21 | 0 | — | — | — | — | — | — | — | — | — | — | — | — | — | — |
| 2022 (S7) | Collingwood | 21 | 10 | 3 | 3 | 30 | 24 | 54 | 18 | 32 | 0.3 | 0.3 | 3.0 | 2.4 | 5.4 | 1.8 | 3.2 |
| 2023 | Gold Coast | 21 | 5 | 4 | 1 | 14 | 22 | 36 | 7 | 5 | 0.8 | 0.2 | 2.8 | 4.4 | 7.2 | 1.4 | 1.0 |
| Career | | | 33 | 18 | 4 | 107 | 85 | 192 | 62 | 72 | 0.5 | 0.1 | 3.2 | 2.6 | 5.8 | 1.9 | 2.2 |
