= Laura Attard =

Australian rules footballer

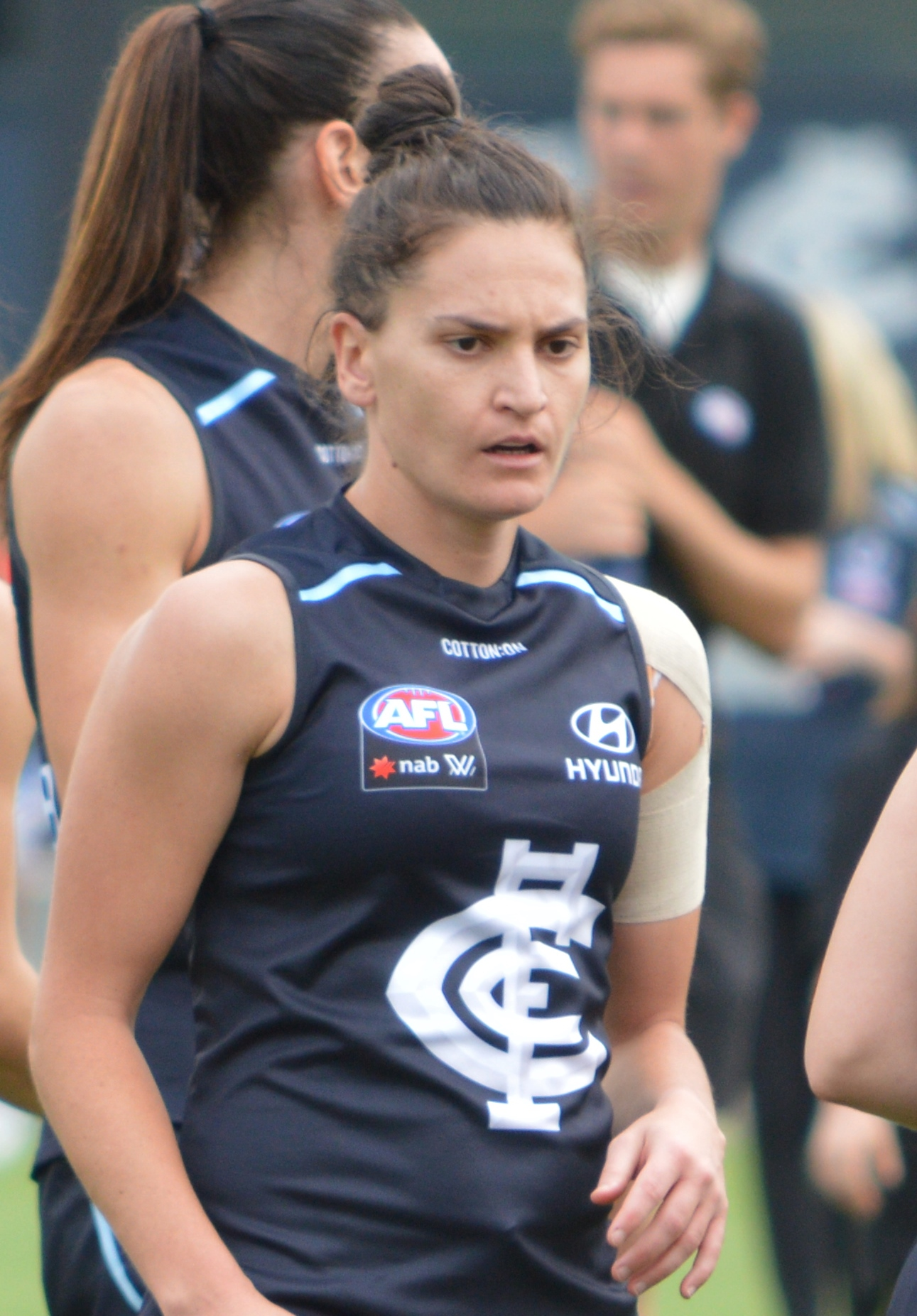
- Attard with Carlton in March 2018

Personal information
- Born: 10 September 1986 (age 40)
- Original team: Diamond Creek (VFL Women's)
- Draft: No. 140, 2016 AFL Women's draft
- Debut: Round 1, 2017, Carlton vs. Collingwood, at Ikon Park
- Height: 168 cm (5 ft 6 in)
- Position: Defender

Playing career^{1}
Years	Club	Games (Goals)
2017–2018	Carlton	8 (0)
- ^{1} Playing statistics correct to the end of the 2018 season.

Laura Attard (born 10 September 1986) is an Australian rules footballer who played for the Carlton Football Club in the AFL Women's competition (AFLW). She was drafted by Carlton with the club's eighteenth selection and the one hundred and fortieth overall in the 2016 AFL Women's draft. She made her debut in Round 1, 2017, in the club and the league's inaugural match at Ikon Park against Collingwood. Attard finished 2017 having played in all seven of Carlton's matches that season. She was delisted by Carlton at the end of the 2018 season.
