= Britt Tully =

Australian rules footballer (born 1993)

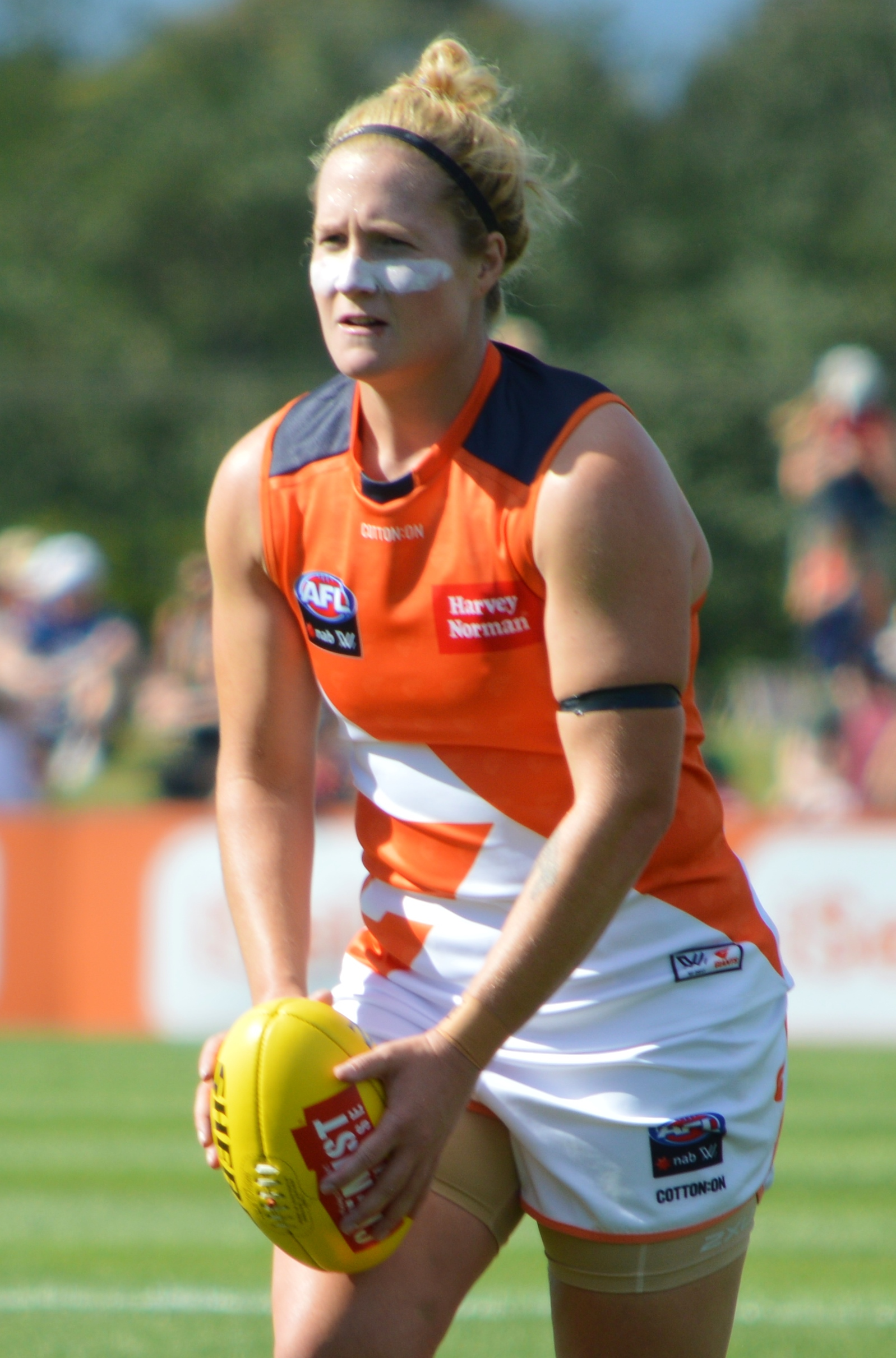
- Tully playing for Greater Western Sydney in February 2018

Personal information
- Full name: Brittany Tully
- Born: 3 May 1993 (age 33)
- Original team: Gungahlin (AFL Canberra)
- Draft: No. 80, 2016 AFL Women's draft
- Debut: Round 1, 2017, Greater Western Sydney vs. Adelaide, at Thebarton Oval
- Height: 163 cm (5 ft 4 in)
- Position: Midfielder

Playing career^{1}
Years	Club	Games (Goals)
2017–2021	Greater Western Sydney	29 (4)
- ^{1} Playing statistics correct to the end of the 2021 season.

Career highlights
- AFL Canberra Women's premiership: 2016; 4× Mary Ann Bainrot Medal (AFL Canberra Women's best and fairest): 2016, 2017, 2018, 2021; 5× AFL Canberra Women's team of the year: 2013, 2014, 2015, 2016, 2017(c), 2018; AFL Canberra Women's team of the decade: 2007–2017; 4× Gungahlin Jets best and fairest: 2013, 2015, 2017, 2018; Coach and Ainslie tricolours best and fairest 2019; 5× ACT representative: 2013, 2014, 2015, 2017 (c); 3× NSW/ACT representative: 2014, 2016; GWS Southern(c) representative team Winter series 2018

Brittany Tully (born 3 May 1993) is an Australian rules footballer and softballer.

Tully plays for the Greater Western Sydney Giants in the AFL Women's competition and retired in 2021. She was drafted by Greater Western Sydney with their tenth selection and eightieth overall in the 2016 AFL Women's draft. She made her debut in the thirty-six point loss to Adelaide at Thebarton Oval in the opening round of the 2017 season. She played every match in her debut season to finish with seven games and ranked second for tackles and third in clearances in the league. She placed 3rd in the GWS Best & Fairest Gabriel Trainor Medal in 2017.

Tully won the best and fairest of AFL Canberra Women's for three consecutive years, between 2016 and 2018.

Tully was listed as an inactive player for GWS for personal reasons in 2019 but has now been recontracted to resume with GWS for the 2020 season. In June 2021, she retired.

She plays for Boomerangs Softball Club in Canberra and played for the ACT Diamonds in the Softball Australia National Competition (Gillies Shield) from 2012 to 2016. She was an Australian Schoolgirls representative in 2010.

== AFLW statistics ==
Statistics are correct to the end of the 2017 season

Legend
G	Goals	K	Kicks	D	Disposals	T	Tackles
B	Behinds	H	Handballs	M	Marks

Season	Team	No.	Games	Totals							Averages (per game)						
Season	Team	No.	Games	G	B	K	H	D	M	T	G	B	K	H	D	M	T
2017	Greater Western Sydney	16	7	0	2	53	19	72	5	28	0.0	0.3	7.6	2.7	10.3	0.7	4.0
Career			7	0	2	53	19	72	5	28	0.0	0.3	7.6	2.7	10.3	0.7	4.0
