= Sarah Last =

Australian rules footballer

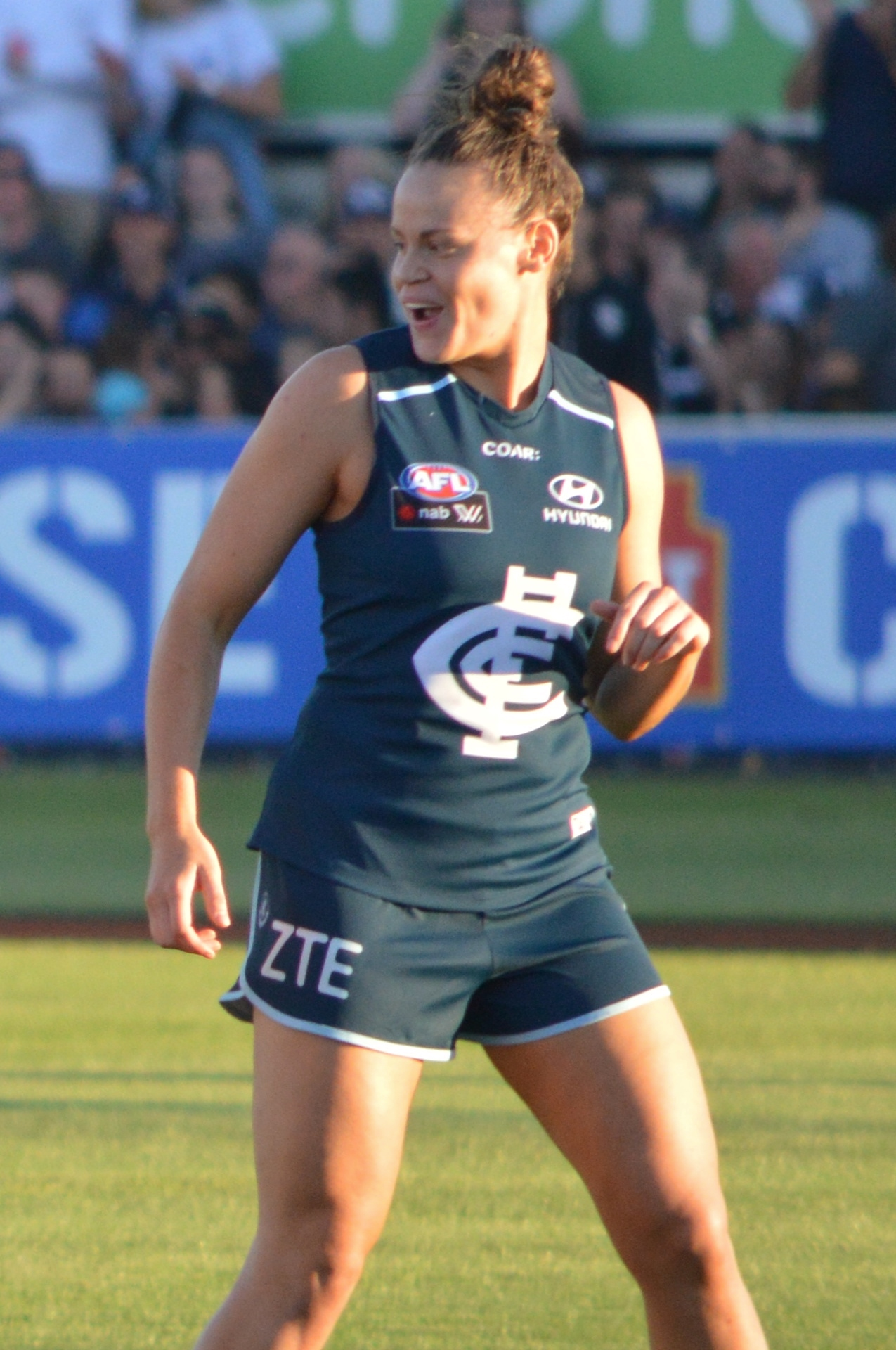
- Last playing for Carlton in February 2017

Personal information
- Born: 22 July 1994 (age 32)
- Original team: Bendigo Thunder (VFL Women's)
- Draft: No. 94, 2016 AFL Women's draft
- Debut: Round 1, 2017, Carlton vs. Collingwood, at Ikon Park
- Height: 172 cm (5 ft 8 in)
- Position: Defender

Playing career^{1}
Years	Club	Games (Goals)
2017–2018	Carlton	5 (0)
- ^{1} Playing statistics correct to the end of the 2018 season.

Sarah Last (born 22 July 1994) is a former Australian rules footballer who played for the Carlton Football Club in the AFL Women's competition (AFLW) and state league side (VFLW). She was drafted by Carlton with the club's 12th selection and the 94th overall in the 2016 AFL Women's Draft. She made her debut in Round 1, 2017, in the club and the league's inaugural match at Ikon Park against Collingwood. Last finished the 2017 season having played three of a possible seven matches with the side. She was delisted by Carlton at the end of the 2018 season.
