= Selina Priest =

Australian rules footballer (born 1990)

Personal information
- Born: 21 August 1990 (age 36); Gold Coast, Queensland
- Original team: Coolangatta Tweed Heads (QWAFL)
- Draft: No. 98, 2016 AFL Women's draft
- Debut: Round 1, 2017, Brisbane vs. Melbourne, at Casey Fields
- Height: 176 cm (5 ft 9 in)
- Position: Utility

Playing career^{1}
Years	Club	Games (Goals)
2017; 2020–2021	Brisbane	8 (0)
- ^{1} Playing statistics correct to the end of the 2021 season.

Selina Priest (formerly Goodman; born 21 August 1990) is an Australian rules footballer who played for the Brisbane Lions in the AFL Women's (AFLW).

== Early life ==
Priest was born in 1990 on the Gold Coast, Queensland.] She was playing for Coolangatta Tweed Heads when she was drafted.

== AFLW career ==
Priest, when known as Selina Goodman, was recruited by Brisbane with the number 98 pick in the 2016 AFL Women's draft. She made her debut in the Lions' inaugural game against Melbourne at Casey Fields on 5 February 2017.

She was delisted by Brisbane at the end of the 2017 season, before changing her surname to Priest and being redrafted by the club ahead of the 2020 season. Following the 2021 season, Priest was delisted by Brisbane again, without having played a game in her second stint on the list.

== Statistics ==
Legend
G	Goals	K	Kicks	D	Disposals	T	Tackles
B	Behinds	H	Handballs	M	Marks	H/O	Hit-outs

Season	Team	No.	Games	Totals								Averages (per game)								Votes
Season	Team	No.	Games	G	B	K	H	D	M	T	H/O	G	B	K	H	D	M	T	H/O	Votes
2017	Brisbane	19	8	0	0	7	10	17	2	10	39	0.0	0.0	0.9	1.3	2.1	0.3	1.3	4.9	0
2020	Brisbane	19	0	—	—	—	—	—	—	—	—	—	—	—	—	—	—	—	—	—
2021	Brisbane	19	0	—	—	—	—	—	—	—	—	—	—	—	—	—	—	—	—	—
Career			8	0	0	7	10	17	2	10	39	0.0	0.0	0.9	1.3	2.1	0.3	1.3	4.9	0
