= Kelly Clinch =

Australian rules footballer

Personal information
- Born: 15 December 1983 (age 42)
- Original team: Subiaco (WAWFL)
- Draft: No. 116, 2016 AFL Women's draft
- Debut: Round 2, 2017, Fremantle vs. Brisbane, at Fremantle Oval
- Height: 180 cm (5 ft 11 in)
- Position: Ruck

Playing career^{1}
Years	Club	Games (Goals)
2017	Fremantle	6 (0)
- ^{1} Playing statistics correct to the end of 2017.

Kelly Clinch (born 15 December 1983) is an Australian rules footballer who played for the Fremantle Football Club in the AFL Women's competition. Clinch was drafted by Fremantle with their 15th selection and 116th overall in the 2016 AFL Women's draft. She made her debut in the thirteen point loss to Brisbane at Fremantle Oval in round two of the 2017 season. After her debut match, she played every match for the year to finish with six matches. She was delisted at the end of the 2017 season.
