= Coolangatta Tweed Heads Australian Football Club =

Australian rules football club based in Queensland

Coolangatta-Tweed Heads
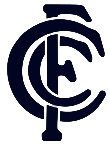

Names
- Full name: Coolangatta-Tweed Heads Football Club
- Nickname: Blues
- Motto: QAFL
- Club song: "We Are the Cooly Blues" to the tune of "Lily of Laguna"

Club details
- Founded: 1962; 64 years ago
- Colours
- President: TBC
- Coach: Pearce Hanley
- Captain: Ned Lanyon
- Ground: Len Peak Oval

Uniforms
| Home | Away |

Other information
- Official website: coolangattafootballclub.com.au

Coolangatta-Tweed Heads Football Club is an Australian rules football club based in Gold Coast, Queensland. The team currently competes in the AFL Queensland league.

== Premierships ==
Gold Coast Australian Football League
1978, 1981, 1982, 1983, 1988, 1989, 2022, 2024

== AFL players ==
- Sam Clohesy to Gold Coast
- Sam Gilbert to St Kilda
- David Hale to North Melbourne & Hawthorn
- Wayde Mills to Brisbane Lions

== Drafted players in the AFLW ==
| Year | Name | Team | Draft No. |
|---|---|---|---|
| 2016 | Leah Kaslar | Brisbane | 31st |
| 2016 | Selina Goodman | Brisbane | 98th |
| 2016 | Nikki Wallace | Brisbane | 114th |
| 2016 | Jamie Stanton | Brisbane | 127th |
| 2016 | Jordan Membrey | Brisbane | Free agent signing |
| 2017 | Arianna Clarke | Brisbane | 15th |
| 2017 | Kalinda Howarth | Brisbane | 31st |
| 2017 | Ruby Blair | Brisbane | 41st |
| 2019 | Maddy Roberts | Gold Coast | Pre-list Signing |
| 2019 | Selina Priest | Brisbane | 45th |
| 2019 | Georgia Breward | Gold Coast | 91st |
| 2020 | Beth Pinchin | Brisbane | Injury Replacement |
