= Brooke Patterson =

Australian rules footballer (born 1989)

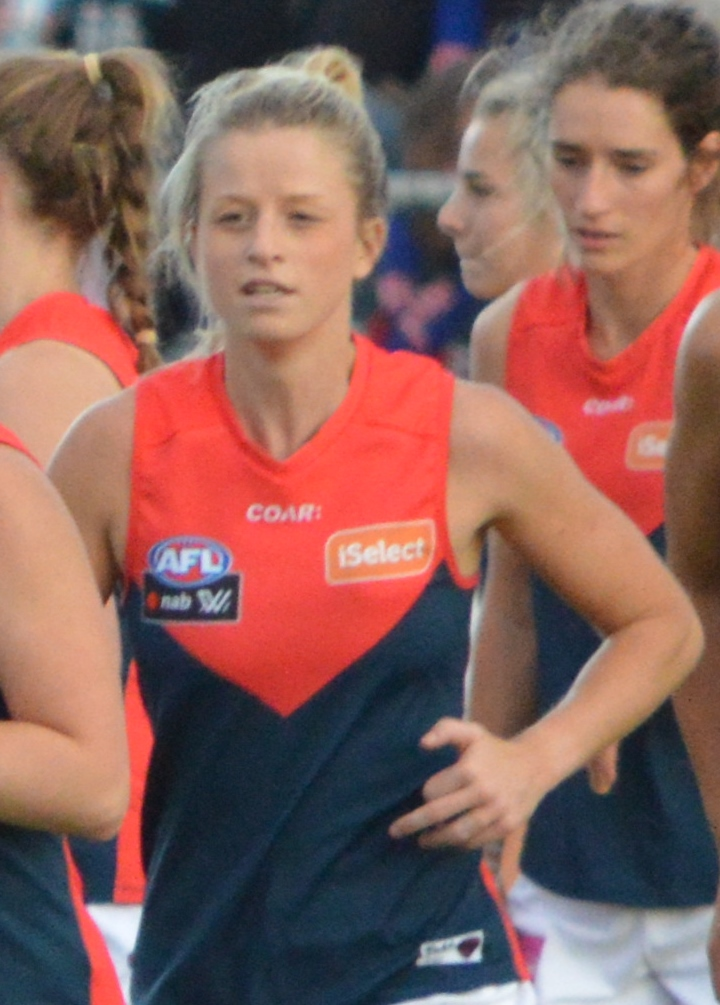
- Patterson playing for Melbourne in February 2017

Personal information
- Born: 11 October 1989 (age 37)
- Original team: Darebin Falcons (VFL Women's)
- Draft: No. 104, 2016 AFL Women's draft
- Debut: Round 2, 2017, Melbourne vs. Collingwood, at Ikon Park
- Height: 172 cm (5 ft 8 in)
- Position: Midfielder

Playing career^{1}
Years	Club	Games (Goals)
2017–2019	Melbourne	11 (0)
- ^{1} Playing statistics correct to the end of the 2019 season.

Brooke Patterson (born 11 October 1989) is an Australian rules footballer who played for the Melbourne Football Club in the AFL Women's competition. She was drafted by Melbourne with their thirteen selection and 104th overall in the 2016 AFL Women's draft. She made her debut in the nineteen point win against Collingwood at Ikon Park in round two of the 2017 season. She played the next two matches before missing the round five match against Greater Western Sydney due to a hamstring injury. She returned for the final round match against Fremantle at Casey Fields to finish with four matches for the season.

Melbourne signed Patterson for the 2018 season during the trade period in May 2017.
