= Courtney Clarkson =

Australian rules footballer

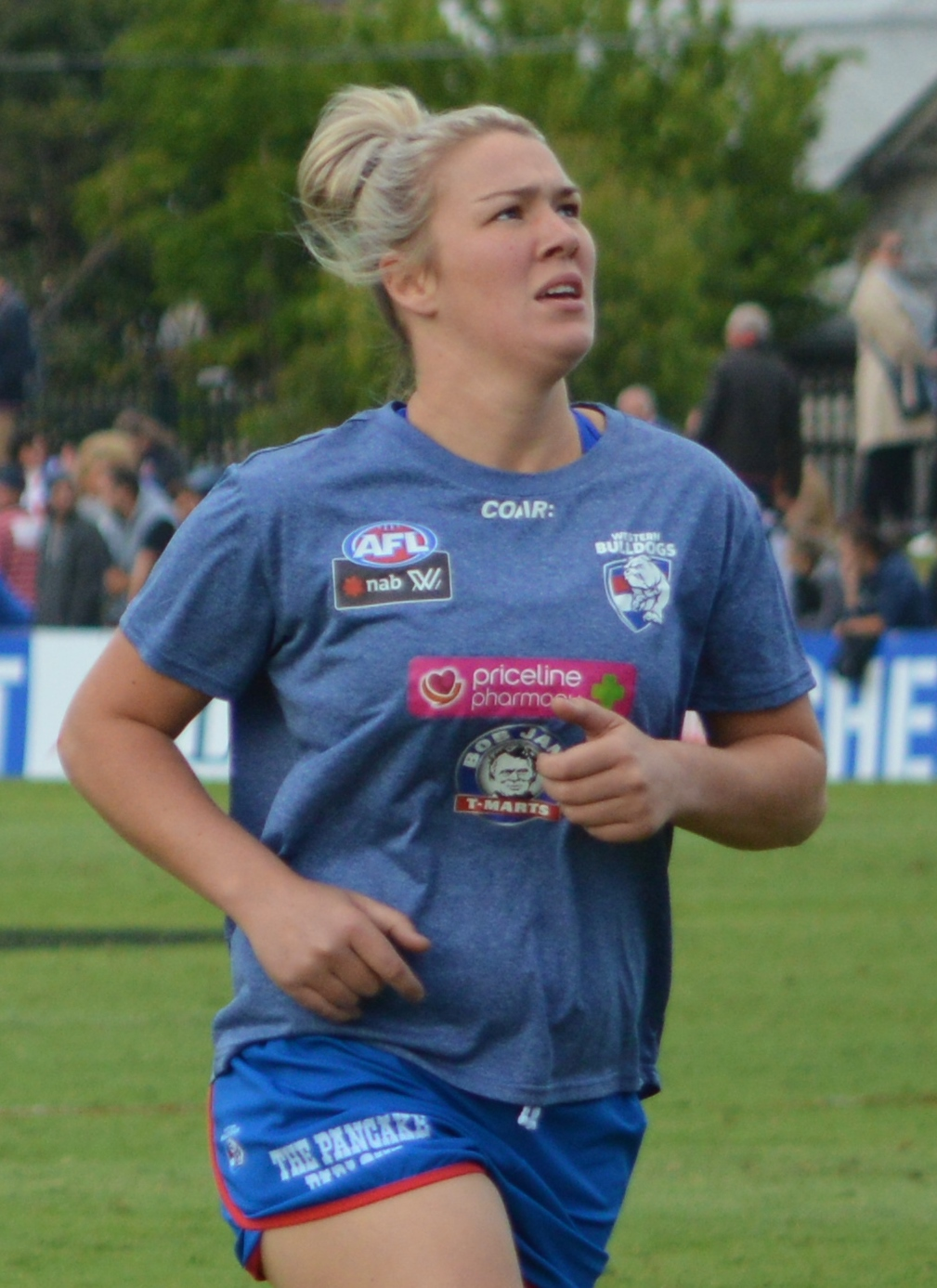
- Clarkson in February 2017

Personal information
- Born: 31 August 1991 (age 35)
- Original team: Cranbourne (VFL Women's)
- Draft: No. 124, 2016 AFL Women's draft
- Debut: Round 2, 2017, Western Bulldogs vs. Adelaide, at VU Whitten Oval
- Height: 182 cm (6 ft 0 in)
- Position: Forward

Playing career^{1}
Years	Club	Games (Goals)
2017	Western Bulldogs	6 (1)
- ^{1} Playing statistics correct to the end of 2017.

Courtney Clarkson (born 31 August 1991) is an Australian rules footballer who played for the Western Bulldogs in the AFL Women's competition. Clarkson was drafted by the Western Bulldogs with their 16th selection and 124th overall in the 2016 AFL Women's draft. She made her debut in the twenty-five point loss to Adelaide at VU Whitten Oval in round two of the 2017 season. She played six matches in her debut season and kicked one goal. She was delisted at the conclusion of the 2017 season.
