= Jess Gardner =

Australian rules footballer

Personal information
- Born: 28 May 1985 (age 41)
- Original team: St Kilda Sharks (VFL Women's)
- Draft: No. 131, 2016 AFL Women's draft
- Debut: Round 1, 2017, Western Bulldogs vs. Fremantle, at VU Whitten Oval
- Height: 170 cm (5 ft 7 in)
- Position: Utility

Playing career^{1}
Years	Club	Games (Goals)
2017	Western Bulldogs	5 (1)
- ^{1} Playing statistics correct to the end of 2017.

Jess Gardner (born 28 May 1985) is an Australian rules footballer who played for the Western Bulldogs in the AFL Women's competition. Gardner was drafted by the Western Bulldogs with their 17th selection and 131st overall in the 2016 AFL Women's draft. She made her debut in the thirty-two point win against Fremantle at VU Whitten Oval in the opening round of the 2017 season. She played five matches in her debut season and kicked one goal. She was delisted at the conclusion of the 2017 season.
