= Lisa Williams (footballer) =

Australian rules footballer (born 1991)

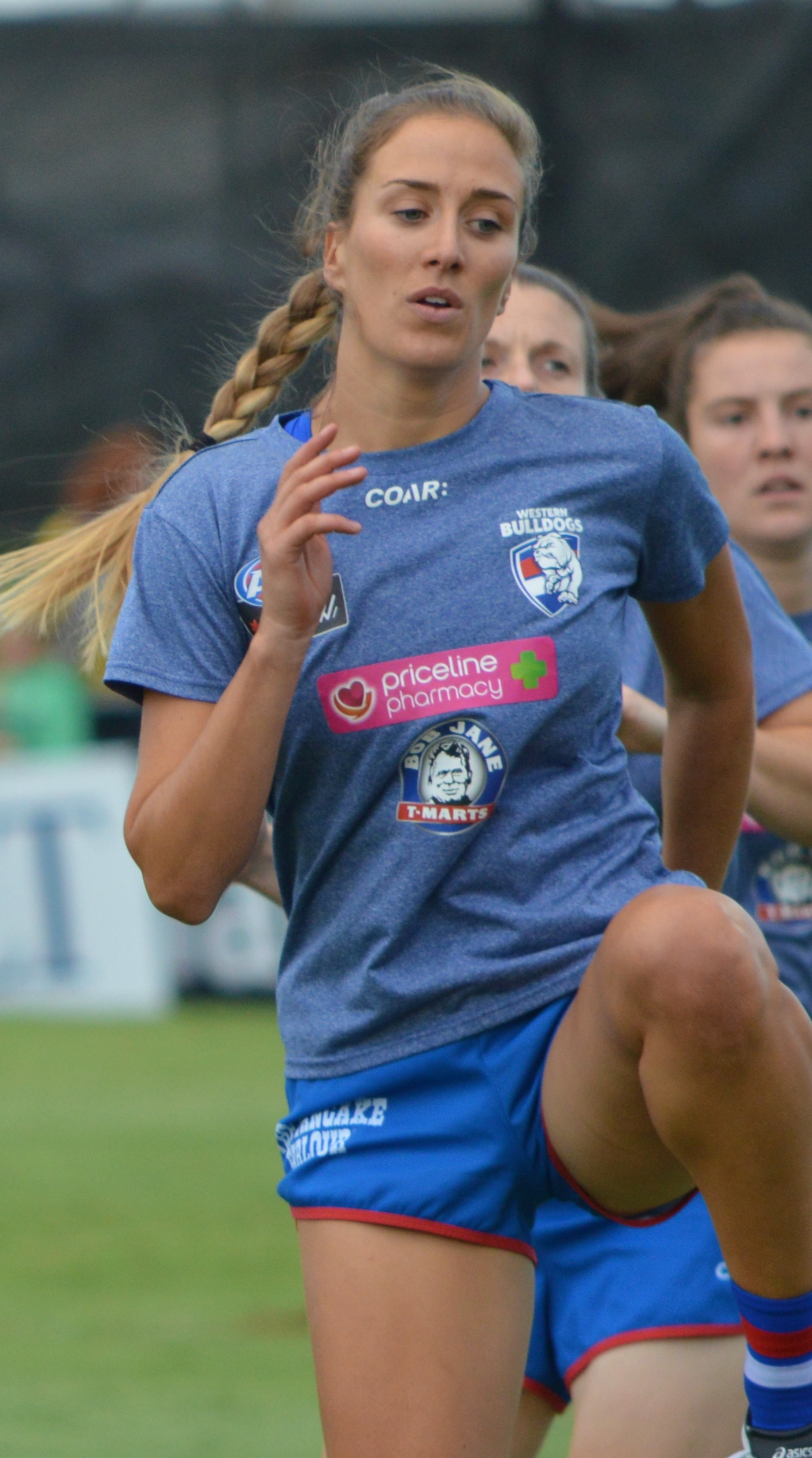
- Williams in February 2017

Personal information
- Born: 3 May 1991 (age 35)
- Original team: Diamond Creek (VFL Women's)
- Draft: No. 92, 2016 AFL Women's draft
- Debut: Round 1, 2017, Western Bulldogs vs. Fremantle, at VU Whitten Oval
- Height: 174 cm (5 ft 9 in)
- Position: Midfielder

Playing career^{1}
Years	Club	Games (Goals)
2017	Western Bulldogs	6 (1)
- ^{1} Playing statistics correct to the end of 2017.

Lisa Williams (born 3 May 1991) is an Australian rules footballer who played for the Western Bulldogs in the AFL Women's competition. Williams was drafted by the Western Bulldogs with their twelfth selection and ninety-second overall in the 2016 AFL Women's draft. She made her debut in the thirty-two point win against Fremantle at VU Whitten Oval in the opening round of the 2017 season. She played six matches in her debut season. She was delisted at the conclusion of the 2017 season. She last played for Essendon in the 2018 VFL Women's season (VFLW), where she was made captain of the team.
