= Demi Okely =

Australian rules footballer

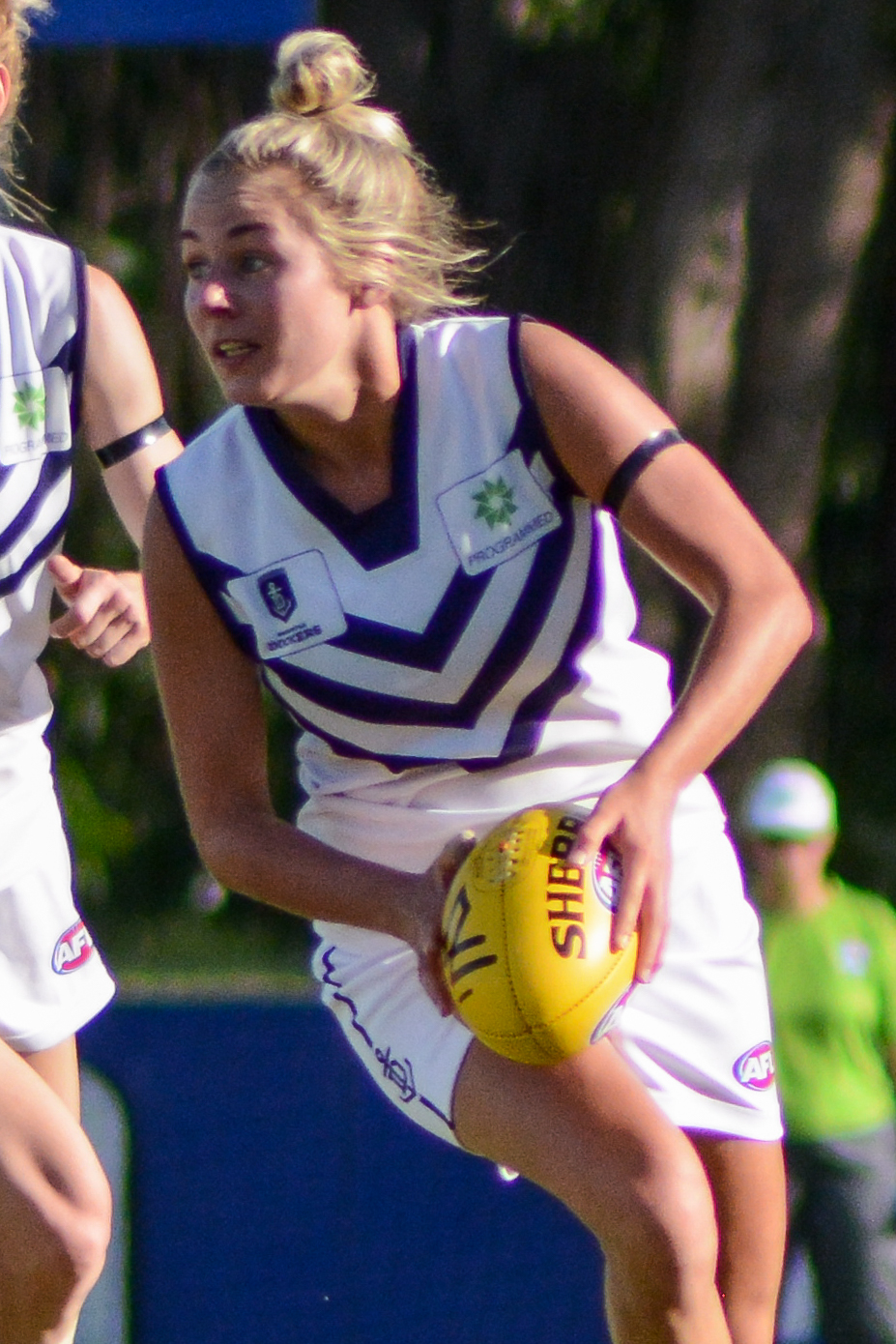
- Okely in January 2017

Personal information
- Born: 19 March 1997 (age 29)
- Original team: Peel Thunder (WAWFL)
- Draft: No. 125, 2016 AFL Women's draft
- Debut: Round 1, 2017, Fremantle vs. Western Bulldogs, at VU Whitten Oval
- Height: 163 cm (5 ft 4 in)
- Position: Midfielder

Playing career^{1}
| Years | Club | Games (Goals) |
| 2017 | Fremantle | 7 (0) |
- ^{1} Playing statistics correct to the end of 2017.

Demi Okely (born 19 March 1997) is an Australian rules footballer who played for the Fremantle Football Club in the AFL Women's competition. Okely was drafted by Fremantle with their 16th selection and 125th overall in the 2016 AFL Women's draft. She made her debut in the thirty-two point loss to the Western Bulldogs at VU Whitten Oval in the opening round of the 2017 season. She played every match in her debut season to finish with seven matches. She was delisted at the end of the 2017 season.
