= Danielle Hardiman =

Australian rules footballer

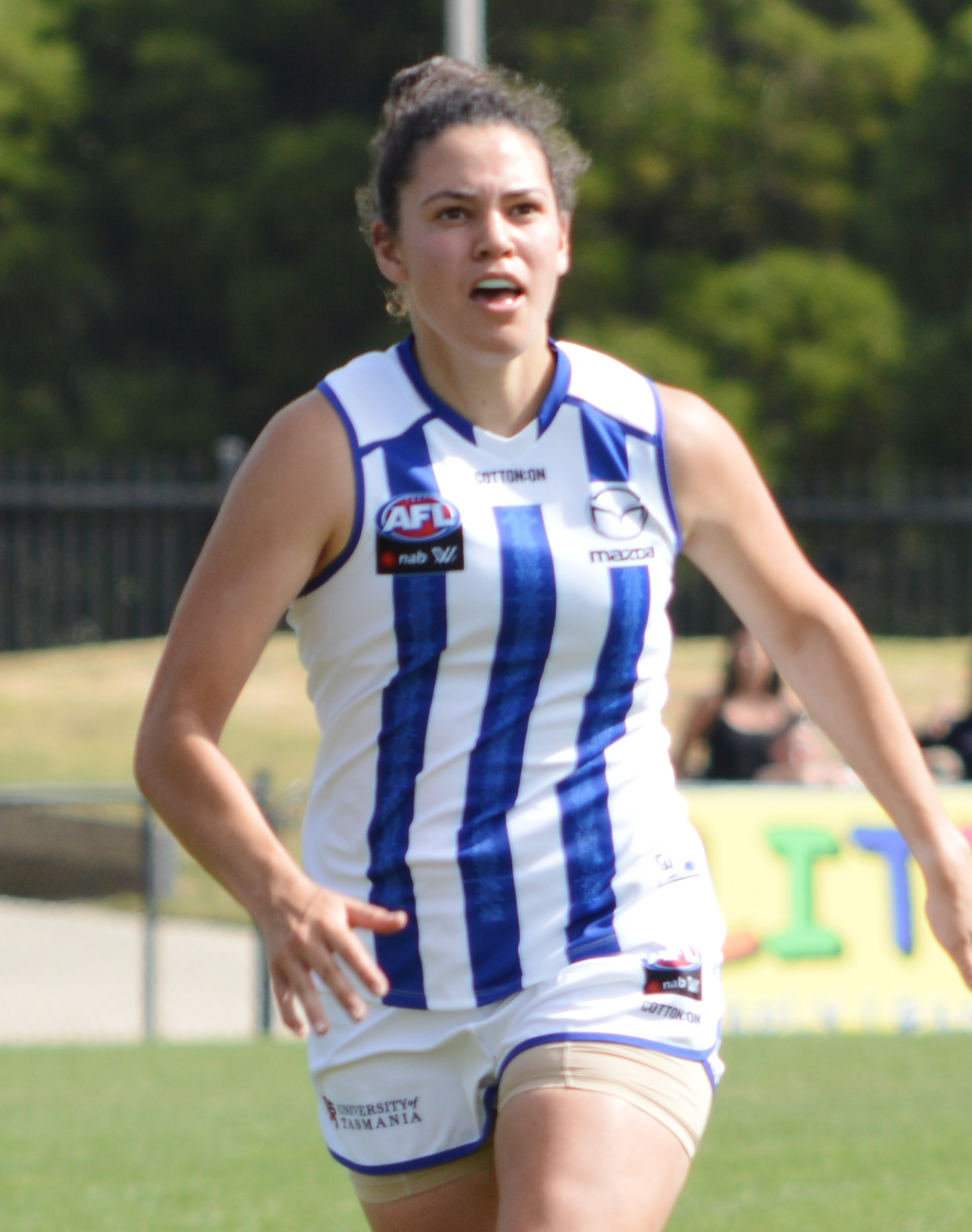
- Hardiman with North Melbourne in January 2019

Personal information
- Born: 7 December 1994 (age 31)
- Original team: Cranbourne (VFL Women's)
- Draft: No. 35, 2016 AFL Women's draft
- Debut: Round 1, 2017, Carlton vs. Collingwood, at Ikon Park
- Height: 175 cm (5 ft 9 in)
- Position: Defender

Playing career^{1}
Years	Club	Games (Goals)
2017–2018	Carlton	12 (0)
2019–S7 (2022)	North Melbourne	30 (0)
Total		42 (0)
- ^{1} Playing statistics correct to the end of the S7 (2022) season.

Danielle Hardiman (born 7 December 1994) is a retired Australian rules footballer who played for Carlton and North Melbourne in the AFL Women's (AFLW). She was drafted by Carlton with the club's fifth selection and the thirty fifth overall in the 2016 AFL Women's draft. She made her debut in Round 1, 2017, in the club and the league's inaugural match at Ikon Park against Collingwood. In May 2018, Hardiman signed with expansion club, North Melbourne, to play with the club in the 2019 AFLW season. It was revealed she signed on with the club for two more seasons on 17 June 2021, tying her to the club until the end of 2023.
