= Rebecca Neaves =

Australian rules footballer (born 1997)

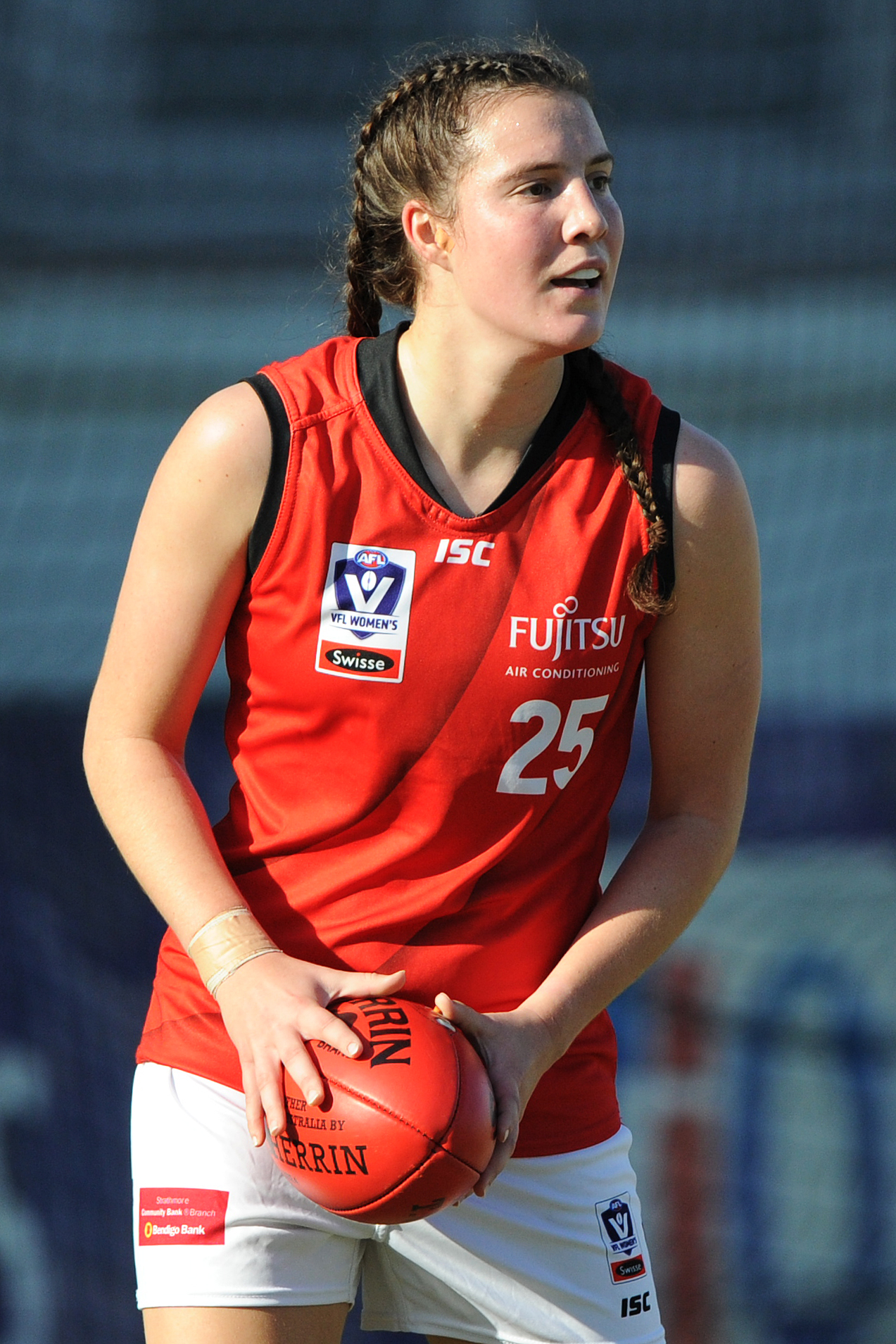
- Neaves in May 2018

Personal information
- Born: 20 February 1997 (age 29)
- Original team: St Kilda Sharks (VFL Women's)
- Draft: 2016 free agent: Western Bulldogs
- Debut: Round 1, 2017, Western Bulldogs vs. Fremantle, at VU Whitten Oval
- Height: 172 cm (5 ft 8 in)
- Position: Midfielder

Playing career^{1}
Years	Club	Games (Goals)
2017	Western Bulldogs	5 (0)
- ^{1} Playing statistics correct to the end of 2017.

Rebecca Neaves (born 20 February 1997) is an Australian rules footballer who played for the Western Bulldogs in the AFL Women's competition. Neaves was recruited by the Western Bulldogs as a free agent in October 2016. She made her debut in the thirty-two point win against Fremantle at VU Whitten Oval in the opening round of the 2017 season. She played five matches in her debut season. She was delisted at the conclusion of the 2017 season. She is now a highly regarded podiatrist.
