= Kimberley Ebb =

Australian rules footballer

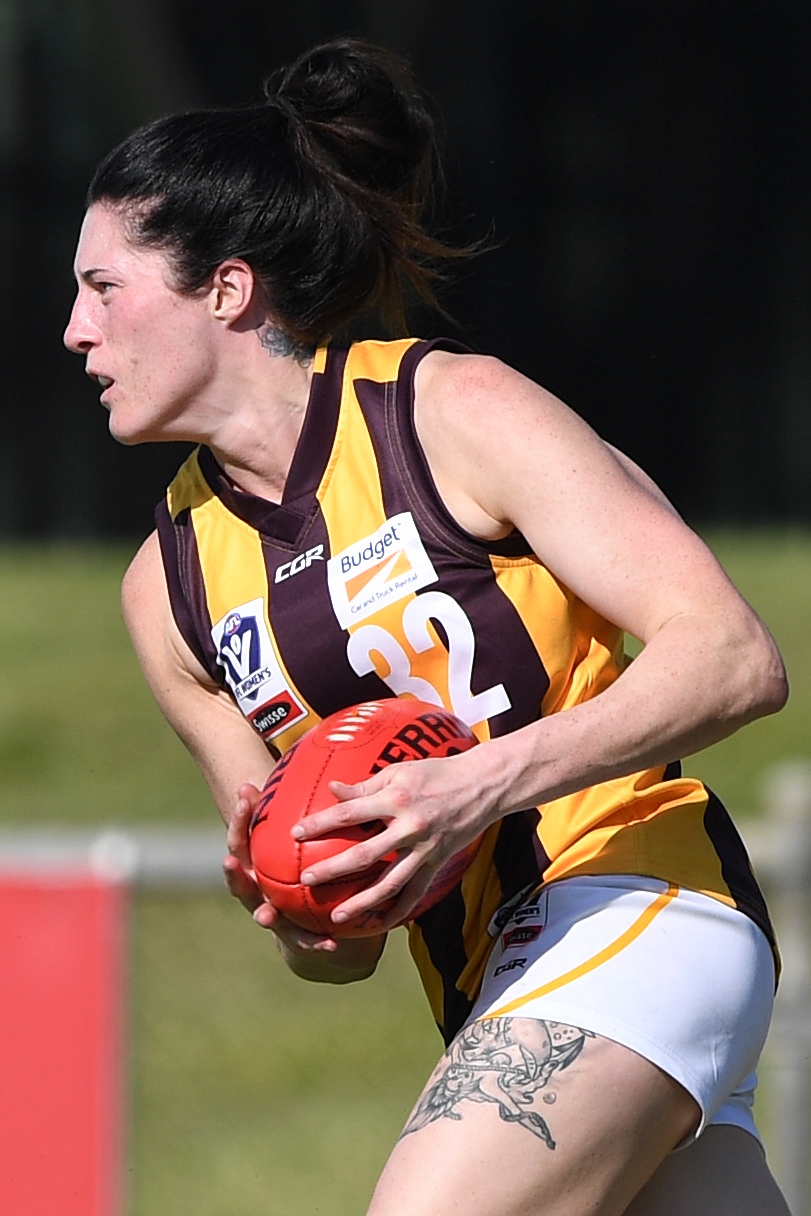
- Ebb in August 2018

Personal information
- Born: 6 April 1987 (age 39)
- Original team: Seaford (VFL Women's)
- Draft: No. 37, 2016 AFL Women's draft
- Debut: Round 3, 2017, Western Bulldogs vs. Melbourne, at VU Whitten Oval
- Height: 172 cm (5 ft 8 in)
- Position: Midfielder

Playing career^{1}
Years	Club	Games (Goals)
2017–2018	Western Bulldogs	4 (0)
- ^{1} Playing statistics correct to the end of the 2018 season.

Kimberley Ebb (born 6 April 1987) is an Australian rules footballer who played for the Western Bulldogs in the AFL Women's (AFLW). Ebb was drafted by the Western Bulldogs with their fifth selection, and was thirty-seventh overall in the 2016 AFL Women's draft. She made her debut in the fourteen point loss to Melbourne at VU Whitten Oval in round three of the 2017 season. She played four matches in her debut season. She was delisted by the Western Bulldogs at the end of the 2018 season.
