= Shae Audley =

Australian rules footballer

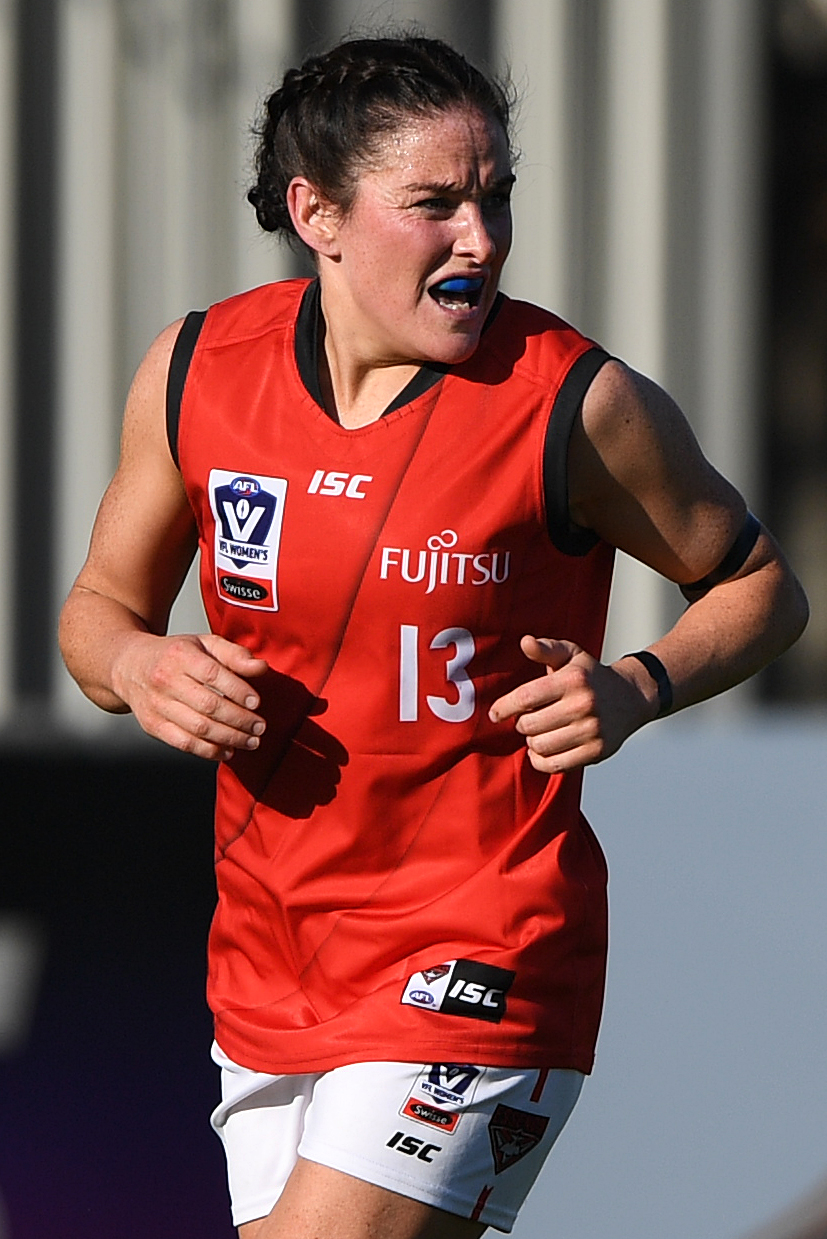
- Audley with Essendon VFLW in June 2019

Personal information
- Born: 13 June 1988 (age 38)
- Original team: Diamond Creek (VFL Women's)
- Draft: No. 46, 2016 AFL Women's draft
- Debut: Round 1, 2017, Carlton vs. Collingwood, at Ikon Park
- Height: 160 cm (5 ft 3 in)
- Position: Midfielder

Playing career^{1}
| Years | Club | Games (Goals) |
| 2017–2019 | Carlton | 16 (2) |
- ^{1} Playing statistics correct to the end of the 2019 season.

Shae Audley (born 13 June 1988) is a former Australian rules footballer who played 16 matches over three seasons with the Carlton Football Club in the AFL Women's competition (AFLW). She was drafted by Carlton with the club's sixth selection and the forty sixth overall in the 2016 AFL Women's draft. She made her debut in Round 1, 2017, in the club and the league's inaugural match at Ikon Park against Collingwood. Audley finished 2017 having played in all seven of Carlton's matches that season.
