= Taylah Angel =

Australian rules footballer

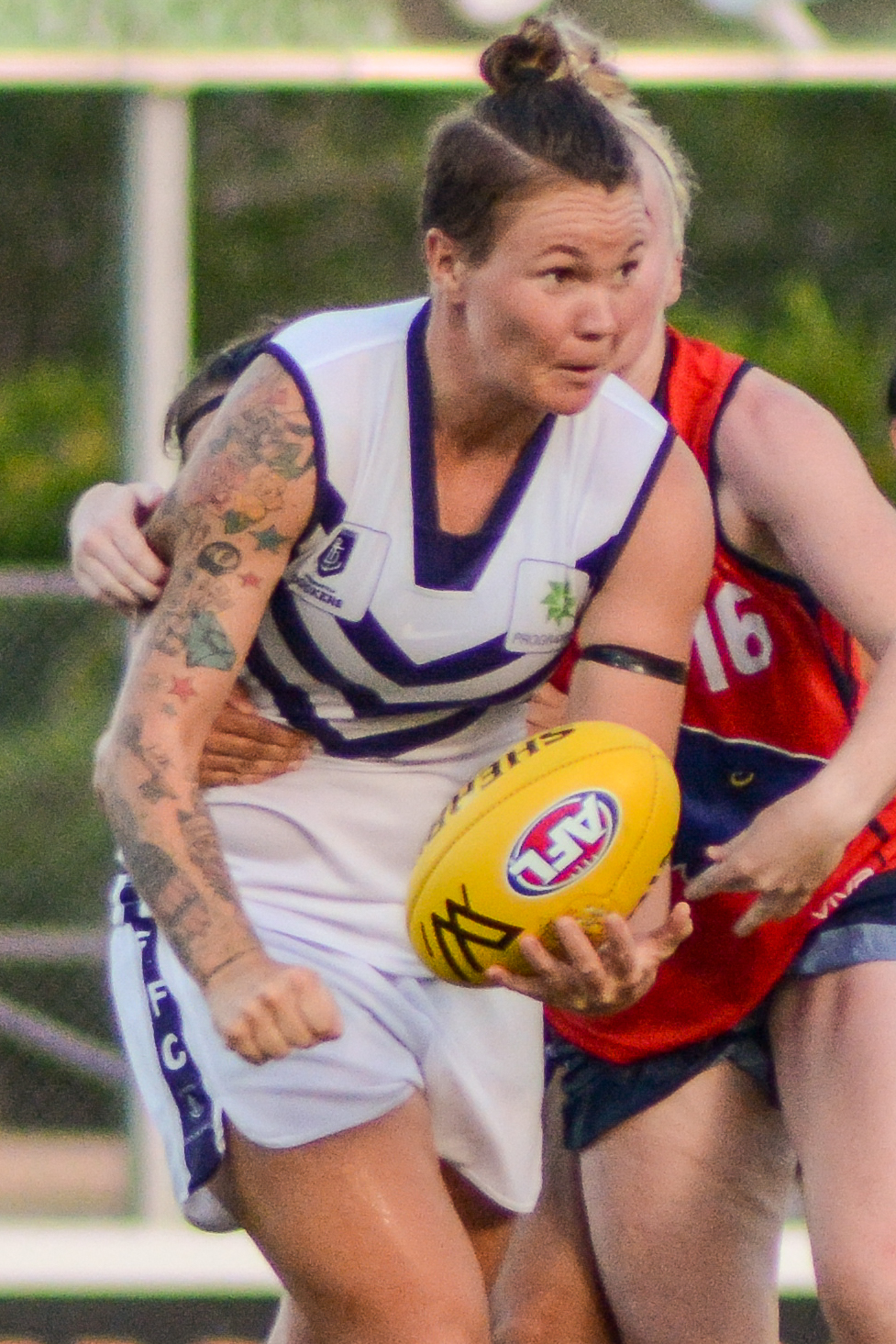
- Angel in January 2017

Personal information
- Born: 15 January 1992 (age 34)
- Original team: Swan Districts (WAWFL)
- Draft: No. 93, 2016 AFL Women's draft
- Debut: Round 1, 2017, Fremantle vs. Western Bulldogs, at VU Whitten Oval
- Height: 168 cm (5 ft 6 in)
- Position: Midfielder

Playing career^{1}
Years	Club	Games (Goals)
2017	Fremantle	4 (0)
- ^{1} Playing statistics correct to the end of 2017.

Taylah Angel (born 15 January 1992) is an Australian rules footballer who played for the Fremantle Football Club in the AFL Women's competition. Angel was drafted by Fremantle with their twelfth selection and ninety-third overall in the 2016 AFL Women's draft. She made her debut in the thirty-two point loss to the Western Bulldogs at VU Whitten Oval in the opening round of the 2017 season. She played the first three matches of the year before being omitted for the round four match against Adelaide. She missed three matches before returning for the final round match against Melbourne to finish with four matches for the year. She was delisted at the end of the 2017 season.
