= Tiarna Ernst =

Australian rules footballer

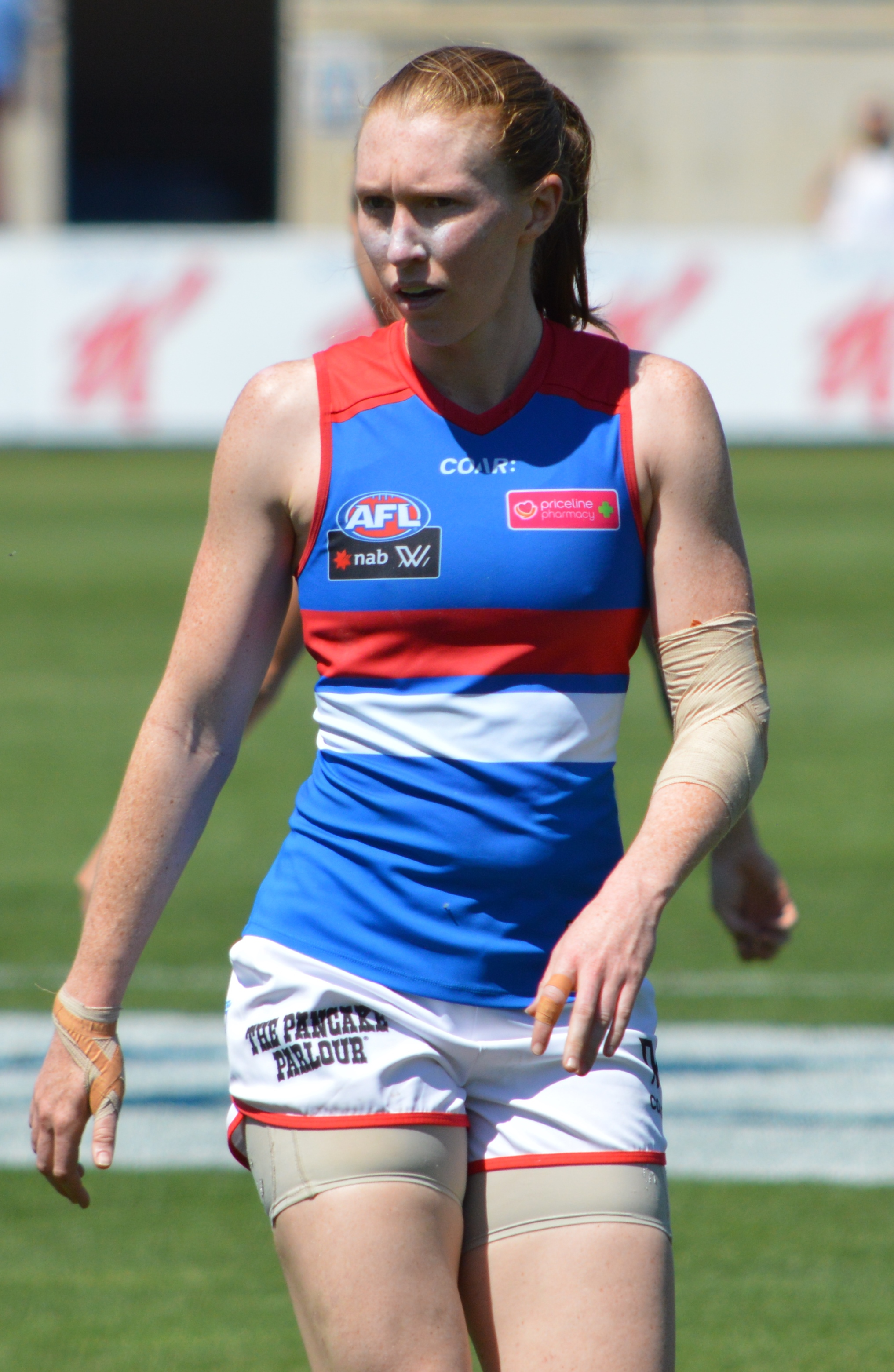
- Ernst playing for the Western Bulldogs in February 2017

Personal information
- Born: 24 January 1988 (age 38); Thursday Island, Queensland
- Original team: Diamond Creek (VFL Women's)
- Draft: No. 108, 2016 AFL Women's draft
- Debut: Round 1, 2017, Western Bulldogs vs. Fremantle, at VU Whitten Oval
- Height: 180 cm (5 ft 11 in)
- Position: Ruck

Club information
- Current club: Gold Coast
- Number: 19

Playing career^{1}
Years	Club	Games (Goals)
2017–2019	Western Bulldogs	22 (0)
2020	Gold Coast	7 (1)
Total		29 (1)
- ^{1} Playing statistics correct to the end of the 2020 season.

Career highlights
- 2018 AFLW Premiership

Tiarna Ernst (born 24 January 1988) is a former Australian rules footballer who played for the Western Bulldogs and Gold Coast in the AFL Women's competition.

== Early life ==
Ernst was born on Thursday Island in the Torres Strait region of Queensland and spent the majority of her childhood in Bamaga in the Cape York Peninsula. She relocated with her family to Julatten prior to entering high school. She competed in athletics events as a youth and was only introduced to Australian rules football while attending James Cook University in Cairns when she was convinced to play in the local football league for the Manunda Hawks. Ernst was drafted by the Western Bulldogs with their 14th selection and 108th overall in the 2016 AFL Women's draft.

She is a medical doctor trained in obstetrics and gynaecology and is currently a fertility specialist for City Fertility.

== AFLW career ==
She made her debut in the thirty-two point win against Fremantle at VU Whitten Oval in the opening round of the 2017 season. She played every match in her debut season to finish with seven games. In April 2019, Ernst joined expansion club Gold Coast. Ernst announced her retirement in October 2020, stating that she was unable to successfully juggle both football and her medical career.
