= Romy Timmins =

Australian rules footballer (born 1989)

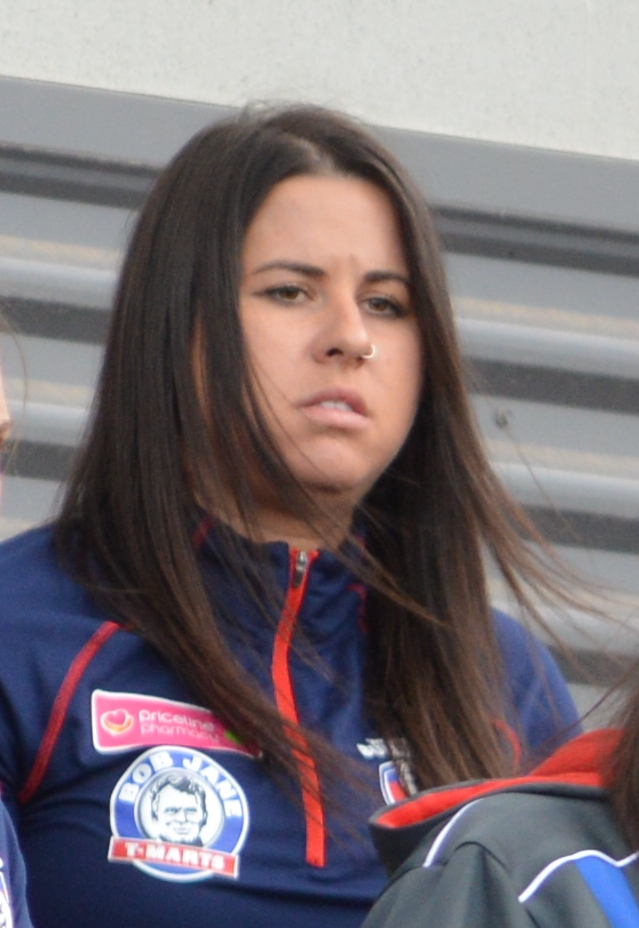
- Romy Timmins during the round 3, 2017 AFL Women's match between the Western Bulldogs and Melbourne.

Personal information
- Full name: Romy Timmins
- Born: 21 April 1989 (age 37)
- Debut: Round 2, 2017, Western Bulldogs vs. Adelaide, at VU Whitten Oval
- Height: 162 cm (5 ft 4 in)
- Position: Midfielder

Playing career^{1}
Years	Club	Games (Goals)
2017	Western Bulldogs	2 (0)
- ^{1} Playing statistics correct to the end of 2017.

Romy Timmins (born 21 April 1989) is an Australian rules footballer who played for the Western Bulldogs in the AFL Women's competition. Timmins was recruited by the Western Bulldogs as a rookie selection in October 2016 after having previously played basketball. She made her debut in the twenty-five point loss to Adelaide at VU Whitten Oval in round two of the 2017 season. She played two matches in her debut season. She was delisted at the conclusion of the 2017 season.
