= Nikki Wallace =

Australian rules footballer (born 1994)

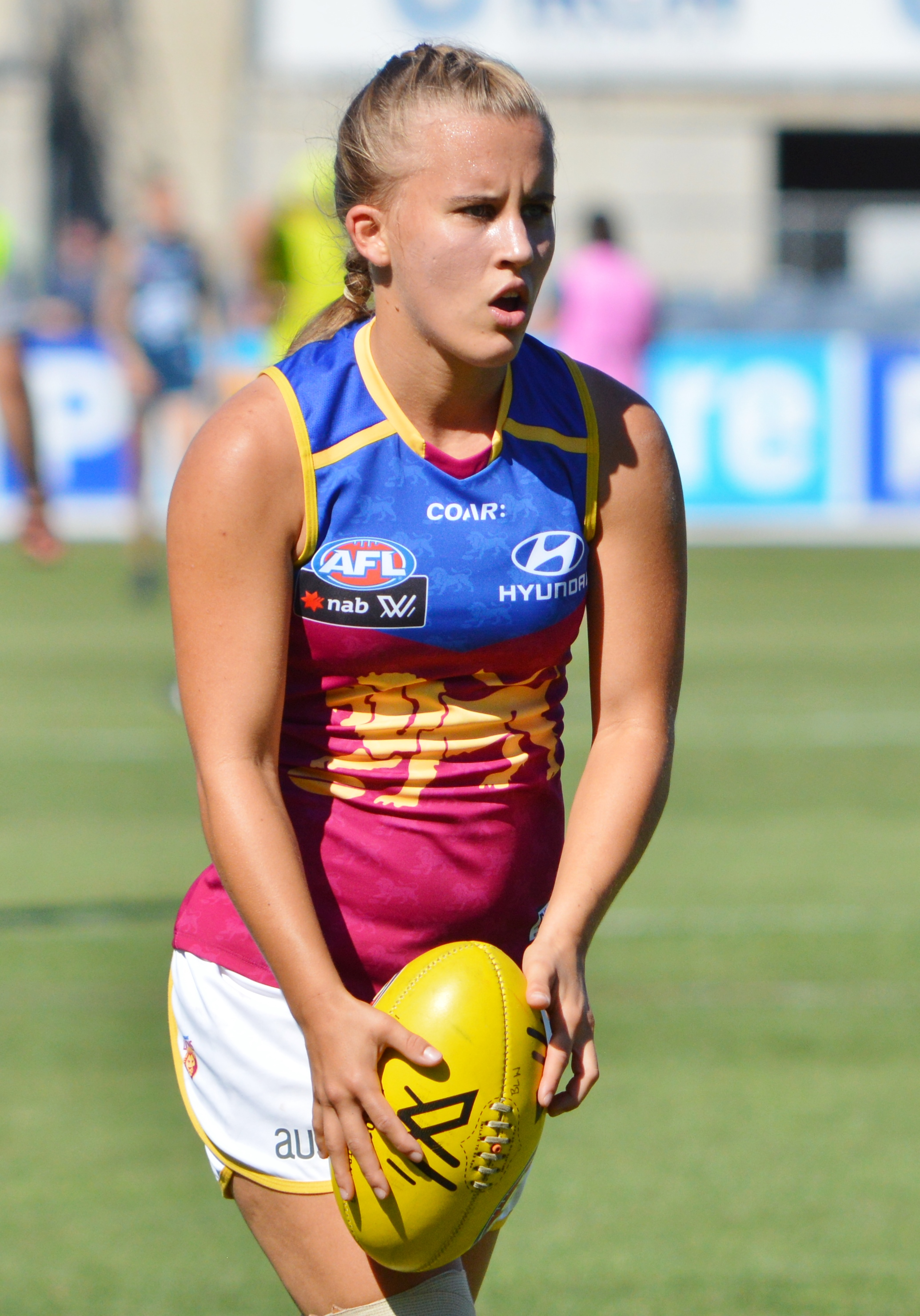
- Wallace in March 2017

Personal information
- Born: 30 July 1994 (age 32); Berwick, Victoria
- Original team: Coolangatta Tweed Heads (QWAFL)
- Draft: No. 114, 2016 AFL Women's draft
- Debut: Round 1, 2017, Brisbane vs. Melbourne, at Casey Fields
- Height: 160 cm (5 ft 3 in)
- Position: Forward

Playing career^{1}
Years	Club	Games (Goals)
2017	Brisbane	8 (0)
- ^{1} Playing statistics correct to the end of 2017.

Nikki Wallace (born 30 July 1994) is an Australian rules footballer who last played for the Brisbane Lions in the AFL Women's.

== Early life ==
Wallace was born in 1994 in Berwick, Victoria. Her family moved to the Coffs Harbour region of NSW and she was first introduced to AFL at the Sawtell Toormina Saints club under coach Tony Linnett. She was playing for Coolangatta Tweed Heads when she was drafted.

== AFLW career ==
Wallace was recruited by Brisbane with the number 114 pick in the 2016 AFL Women's draft. She made her debut in the Lions' inaugural game against Melbourne at Casey Fields on 5 February 2017.

Wallace was delisted by Brisbane at the end of the 2017 season. After spending 2018 to 2020 at VFLW club Williamstown Wallace played for Waratah NTFL club for part of season 2020/2021. Wallace continued her VFLW career in 2021 at the North Melbourne Football Club, and was named the captain.

The Best and Fairest Medal for the AFL North Coast Youth Girls age group is named the Nikki Wallace medal in recognition of Nikki being the first player from the region to play AFLW.

== Statistics ==
Legend
G	Goals	K	Kicks	D	Disposals	T	Tackles
B	Behinds	H	Handballs	M	Marks

Season	Team	No.	Games	Totals							Averages (per game)							Votes
Season	Team	No.	Games	G	B	K	H	D	M	T	G	B	K	H	D	M	T	Votes
2017	Brisbane	24	8	0	0	18	21	39	5	16	0.0	0.0	2.3	2.6	4.9	0.6	2.0	0
Career			8	0	0	18	21	39	5	16	0.0	0.0	2.3	2.6	4.9	0.6	2.0	0
