= Sydney Women's AFL =

Australia rules football governing body

- Sport: Australian rules football
- Founded: 1999, Sydney
- Folded: 2012
- No. of teams: 11
- Country: Australia

The Sydney Women's Australian Football League (SWAFL) was the governing body of the sport of Women's Australian rules football in the state of New South Wales from 2000 to 2011.

In 2012 SWAFL ceased to exist and the women's competition came under the umbrella of AFL Sydney.

== Clubs - 2012 ==
- Auburn Giants (Debut 2011)
- Balmain Dockers
- UNSW Eastern Suburbs Stingrays
- Macquarie University Warriors
- Newtown Breakaways
- Penrith Ramettes (Debut 2012)
- Southern Power (Debut 2010)
- Sydney University
- Western Wolves Women's Football Club
- Wollongong Saints (Debut 2010)
- UTS Shamrocks (Debut 2009 as Bondi Shamrocks)

Previous clubs that have participated in the SWAFL Competition have included:

- Bondi Shamrocks, 2009-2011
- Camden Power, 2004-2006
- St George Crows, 2007-2008 (then St George Dragons in 2009)
- Sydney Uni Blue team, 2004-2007
- University of Technology, Sydney (UTS), 2001-2005

== 2012 ladder ==
Sydney Women's AFL	Wins	Byes	Losses	Draws	For	Against	%	Pts
Balmain Dockers	14	0	0	0	1469	203	723.65%	56
Wollongong	11	0	3	0	965	261	369.73%	44
Sydney University	10	0	4	0	976	333	293.09%	40
Western Wolves	9	0	5	0	865	399	216.79%	36
Newtown Breakaways	8	0	6	0	690	539	128.01%	32
UNSW Stingrays	8	0	6	0	663	572	115.91%	32
Macquarie University	7	0	7	0	493	539	91.47%	28
Southern Power	4	0	10	0	410	590	69.49%	16
UTS Shamrocks	3	0	11	0	218	1166	18.70%	12
Auburn Tigers	2	0	11	1	235	1146	20.51%	10
Penrith Ramettes	0	0	13	1	184	1420	12.96%	2

FINALS

Final	Team	G	B	Pts	Team	G	B	Pts
Elimination	Sydney University	13	10	88	UNSW Stingrays	1	4	10
Qualifying	Western Wolves	10	7	67	Newtown Breakaways	2	2	14
1st Semi	Balmain Dockers	9	10	64	Western Wolves	1	3	9
2nd Semi	Sydney University	13	6	84	Wollongong	1	0	6
Grand	Balmain Dockers	7	9	51	Sydney University	2	1	13

== See also ==
- List of Australian rules football women's leagues
