= List of AFL Women's debuts in 2018 =

The 2018 AFL Women's season was the second season of the AFLW. The season saw 62 players make their senior AFLW debut and a further 14 players transfer to new clubs having previously played in the 2017 AFL Women's season.

== Summary ==
Summary of debuts in 2018
Club	Debut		Total
Club	AFLW	New club	Total
Adelaide	6	0	6
Brisbane	5	2	7
Carlton	10	2	12
Collingwood	8	1	9
Fremantle	8	2	10
Greater Western Sydney	9	3	12
Melbourne	7	2	9
Western Bulldogs	9	2	10
Total	62	14	76

== AFL Women's debuts ==
Name	Club	Age at debut	Debut round	Games	Goals	Notes
Eloise Jones	Adelaide	18 years, 281 days	1	78	53	
Marijana Rajcic	Adelaide	28 years, 339 days	3	50	2	Married to Chelsea Randall.
Jessica Allan	Adelaide	18 years, 253 days	1	40	3	Sister of Sarah Allan.
Jasmyn Hewett	Adelaide	24 years, 128 days	1	10	3	
Ruth Wallace	Adelaide	25 years, 2 days	1	7	7	
Rheanne Lugg	Adelaide	27 years, 346 days	1	6	0	Daughter of Gary Lugg.
Sophie Conway	Brisbane	18 years, 303 days	1	83	52	
Nat Exon	Brisbane	25 years, 66 days	2	14	6	Previously played for Carlton.
Jordan Zanchetta	Brisbane	22 years, 322 days	1	13	1	
Arianna Clarke	Brisbane	18 years, 171 days	1	12	0	
Gabby Collingwood	Brisbane	19 years, 19 days	1	12	0	
Emma Pittman	Brisbane	25 years, 57 days	4	8	0	
Bella Ayre	Brisbane	19 years, 70 days	3	6	0	Previously played for Carlton.
Kerryn Harrington	Carlton	25 years, 337 days	1	64	4	
Nicola Stevens	Carlton	24 years, 315 days	1	42	20	Previously played for Collingwood.
Georgia Gee	Carlton	18 years, 97 days	1	40	19	
Jess Hosking	Carlton	22 years, 62 days	1	30	1	Twin sister of Sarah Hosking.
Tayla Harris	Carlton	20 years, 292 days	1	29	25	Previously played for Brisbane.
Maddi Gay	Carlton	21 years, 127 days	1	7	1	
Sophie Li	Carlton	19 years, 308 days	1	7	0	
Reni Hicks	Carlton	19 years, 155 days	2	4	0	
Bridie Kennedy	Carlton	18 years, 153 days	4	4	0	
Katie-Jayne Grieve	Carlton	20 years, 346 days	3	2	0	
Courtney Webb	Carlton	18 years, 85 days	4	2	0	Also played cricket for Tasmania and South Australia.
Tiahna Cochrane	Carlton	19 years, 245 days	6	1	0	Great niece of Trevor Keogh.
Jaimee Lambert	Collingwood	23 years, 209 days	1	55	17	Previously played for the Western Bulldogs.
Chloe Molloy	Collingwood	19 years, 58 days	1	47	37	Niece of Jarrod Molloy.
Ashleigh Brazill	Collingwood	28 years, 71 days	6	32	5	
Sarah Dargan	Collingwood	18 years, 364 days	1	14	2	
Eliza Hynes	Collingwood	26 years, 4 days	1	11	0	
Kristy Stratton	Collingwood	23 years, 43 days	6	11	1	
Iilish Ross	Collingwood	18 years, 226 days	1	11	0	
Holly Whitford	Collingwood	18 years, 364 days	2	4	0	
Georgie Parker	Collingwood	28 years, 318 days	6	3	0	Also played field hockey for Australia.
Evangeline Gooch	Fremantle	22 years, 112 days	1	23	1	
Leah Mascall	Fremantle	27 years, 257 days	1	19	0	
Ashlee Atkins	Fremantle	24 years, 308 days	1	13	6	
Alex Williams	Fremantle	24 years, 290 days	1	13	0	Previously played for Greater Western Sydney.
Kellie Gibson	Fremantle	21 years, 281 days	7	8	8	Previously played for Adelaide.
Lisa Webb	Fremantle	33 years, 289 days	2	6	2	Married to Marc Webb.
Jodie White	Fremantle	37 years, 135 days	1	4	0	
Emily McGuire	Fremantle	19 years, 37 days	3	3	2	
Tayla McAuliffe	Fremantle	18 years, 353 days	5	3	0	
Jade de Melo	Fremantle	25 years, 22 days	5	2	0	
Alicia Eva	Greater Western Sydney	26 years, 364 days	1	72	13	Previously played for Collingwood.
Pepa Randall	Greater Western Sydney	21 years, 308 days	1	62	0	Great-granddaughter of Viv Randall and granddaughter of Trevor Randall.
Cora Staunton	Greater Western Sydney	36 years, 52 days	1	50	55	
Tanya Hetherington	Greater Western Sydney	32 years, 295 days	1	46	0	
Jodie Hicks	Greater Western Sydney	15 years, 315 days	1	40	5	
Elle Bennetts	Greater Western Sydney	28 years, 150 days	1	30	2	
Rebecca Privitelli	Greater Western Sydney	23 years, 31 days	1	23	14	Previously played for Carlton.
Courtney Gum	Greater Western Sydney	36 years, 131 days	1	14	5	
Phoebe Monahan	Greater Western Sydney	24 years, 221 days	2	10	0	
Renee Forth	Greater Western Sydney	31 years, 6 days	1	5	0	
Maddie Boyd	Greater Western Sydney	24 years, 320 days	1	2	0	Previously played for Melbourne.
Philippa Smyth	Greater Western Sydney	22 years, 169 days	4	1	0	
Kate Hore	Melbourne	22 years, 315 days	1	88	97	
Eden Zanker	Melbourne	18 years, 111 days	5	82	71	
Tegan Cunningham	Melbourne	30 years, 11 days	1	32	25	Sister of Caitlin Cunningham.
Bianca Jakobsson	Melbourne	24 years, 310 days	1	13	3	Previously played for Carlton.
Ashleigh Guest	Melbourne	27 years, 299 days	1	11	0	Previously played for Greater Western Sydney.
Maddy Guerin	Melbourne	18 years, 101 days	1	6	0	
Erin Hoare	Melbourne	28 years, 231 days	1	4	0	
Anna Teague	Melbourne	30 years, 78 days	4	4	0	
Claudia Whitfort	Melbourne	18 years, 214 days	5	4	0	
Naomi Ferres	Western Bulldogs	20 years, 101 days	1	61	2	
Deanna Berry	Western Bulldogs	19 years, 273 days	1	56	18	Previously played for Melbourne.
Bonnie Toogood	Western Bulldogs	20 years, 58 days	1	37	29	
Kim Rennie	Western Bulldogs	23 years, 127 days	4	24	1	
Isabel Huntington	Western Bulldogs	18 years, 344 days	1	20	18	Cousin of Will Setterfield.
Monique Conti	Western Bulldogs	18 years, 57 days	1	15	4	
Aisling Utri	Western Bulldogs	19 years, 320 days	1	14	7	
Jenna Bruton	Western Bulldogs	22 years, 88 days	1	8	3	
Emma Mackie	Western Bulldogs	33 years, 148 days	1	7	1	Represented Australia in road cycling.
Jessica Anderson	Western Bulldogs	20 years, 93 days	3	1	0	Previously played for Melbourne.
Daria Bannister	Western Bulldogs	18 years, 290 days	1	1	0	
