= 2017 AFL Women's draft =

Fifth women's draft organised by the Australian Football League

General information
- Date: 18 October 2017
- Time: 12:00 pm AEDT
- Location: NAB Building, Docklands, Victoria
- Network: afl.com.au
- Sponsored by: National Australia Bank

Overview
- League: AFL Women's
- First selection: Isabel Huntington (Western Bulldogs)

The 2017 AFL Women's draft consisted of the various periods when the eight clubs in the AFL Women's competition could recruit players prior to the competition's 2018 season.

As the previous season's player contracts were all capped at one-year deals, all existing AFLW players must be re-signed prior to the 2018 season. Entering the second season of the competition, clubs will have larger list sizes, with 27 senior listed players (up from 25), and three rookie listed players (up from two).

== Signing and trading period ==
Beginning 1 May, clubs were given an 18-day window to re-sign players on their lists from the previous season, with teams being required to retain between 15 and 22 players during that period. There was also a window for teams to trade players and draft picks in a trade period that started on 15 May 2017, and continued for 12 days.

Players were eligible to seek a trade should they receive a contract offer from a rival club at a pay scale level above their previous years' salary. Players could also reject any offer from their existing club lower rate than in 2017, and become restricted free agents permitted to sign with another club at or above their previous salary.

Players who do not receive offers from their 2017 club were free to sign with any club during the four-day free agency period starting 29 May 2017 or to nominate for the 2017 draft.

=== Trades ===
2017 AFLW trade period
No.	Player(s)	Traded from	Traded to	Traded for	Ref
1	Nicola Stevens	Collingwood	Carlton	Pick 5	
1	Nicola Stevens	Collingwood	Carlton	Pick 13	
1	Pick 28	Collingwood	Carlton	Pick 21	
2	Alicia Eva	Collingwood	Greater Western Sydney	Pick 1	
2	Pick 5	Collingwood	Greater Western Sydney	Pick 9	
2	Jaimee Lambert	Western Bulldogs	Collingwood	Pick 1	
2	Jaimee Lambert	Western Bulldogs	Collingwood	Pick 4	
2	Pick 3	Western Bulldogs	Collingwood	Pick 12	
3	Ashleigh Guest	Greater Western Sydney	Melbourne	Pepa Randall	
4	Maddie Boyd	Melbourne	Greater Western Sydney	Pick 33	
5	Deanna Berry	Melbourne	Western Bulldogs	Pick 12	
5	Bianca Jakobsson	Carlton	Melbourne	Pick 12	
5	Tayla Harris	Brisbane	Carlton	Bella Ayre	
5	Tayla Harris	Brisbane	Carlton	Nat Exon	

=== Retirements and delistings ===
List of 2017 AFLW player changes

Name	Club	Date	Notes	Ref.
Kendra Heil	Collingwood	15 May 2017	Delisted	
Kate Sheahan	Collingwood	15 May 2017	Delisted	
Heather Anderson	Adelaide	25 May 2017	Delisted	
Jasmine Anderson	Adelaide	25 May 2017	Delisted	
Sophie Armitstead	Adelaide	25 May 2017	Delisted	
Lauren O'Shea	Adelaide	25 May 2017	Delisted	
Helen Roden	Collingwood	26 May 2017	Delisted	
Penny Cula-Reid	Collingwood	26 May 2017	Delisted	
Georgia Walker	Collingwood	26 May 2017	Delisted	
Lou Wotton	Collingwood	26 May 2017	Delisted	
Alison Brown	Carlton	26 May 2017	Delisted	
Kate Darby	Carlton	26 May 2017	Delisted	
Jordan Ivey	Carlton	26 May 2017	Delisted	
Jess Kennedy	Carlton	26 May 2017	Delisted	
Tahni Nestor	Carlton	26 May 2017	Delisted	
Rebecca Privitelli	Carlton	26 May 2017	Delisted	
Hayley Trevean	Carlton	26 May 2017	Delisted	
Kellie Gibson	Adelaide	26 May 2017	Delisted	
Monique Hollick	Adelaide	26 May 2017	Delisted	
Tayla Thorn	Adelaide	26 May 2017	Delisted	
Caitlin Collins	Brisbane	26 May 2017	Delisted	
Kate Deegan	Brisbane	26 May 2017	Delisted	
Selina Goodman	Brisbane	26 May 2017	Delisted	
Delissa Kimmince	Brisbane	26 May 2017	Delisted	
Shaleise Law	Brisbane	26 May 2017	Delisted	
Jordan Membrey	Brisbane	26 May 2017	Delisted	
Jade Ransfield	Brisbane	26 May 2017	Delisted	
Nikki Wallace	Brisbane	26 May 2017	Delisted	
Taylah Angel	Fremantle	26 May 2017	Delisted	
Emily Bonser	Fremantle	26 May 2017	Delisted	
Stephanie Cain	Fremantle	26 May 2017	Delisted	
Kelly Clinch	Fremantle	26 May 2017	Delisted	
Beatrice Devlyn	Fremantle	26 May 2017	Delisted	
Tarnica Golisano	Fremantle	26 May 2017	Delisted	
Alicia Janz	Fremantle	26 May 2017	Delisted	
Akec Makur Chuot	Fremantle	26 May 2017	Delisted	
Kim Mickle	Fremantle	26 May 2017	Retired	
Demi Okely	Fremantle	26 May 2017	Delisted	
Kira Phillips	Fremantle	26 May 2017	Delisted	
Taryn Priestly	Fremantle	26 May 2017	Delisted	
Jess Bibby	Greater Western Sydney	26 May 2017	Retired	
Codie Briggs	Greater Western Sydney	26 May 2017	Delisted	
Kristy De Pellegrini	Greater Western Sydney	26 May 2017	Delisted	
Hannah Dunn	Greater Western Sydney	26 May 2017	Delisted	
Clare Lawton	Greater Western Sydney	26 May 2017	Delisted	
Mai Nguyen	Greater Western Sydney	26 May 2017	Delisted	
Ella Ross	Greater Western Sydney	26 May 2017	Delisted	
Isabella Rudolph	Greater Western Sydney	26 May 2017	Delisted	
Kate Stanton	Greater Western Sydney	26 May 2017	Delisted	
Stephanie Walker	Greater Western Sydney	26 May 2017	Delisted	
Hannah Wallett	Greater Western Sydney	26 May 2017	Delisted	
Alex Williams	Greater Western Sydney	26 May 2017	Delisted	
Jessica Anderson	Melbourne	26 May 2017	Delisted	
Mia-Rae Clifford	Melbourne	26 May 2017	Delisted	
Harriet Cordner	Melbourne	26 May 2017	Delisted	
Stephanie De Bortoli	Melbourne	26 May 2017	Delisted	
Sarah Jolly	Melbourne	26 May 2017	Delisted	
Elise Strachan	Melbourne	26 May 2017	Delisted	
Courtney Clarkson	Western Bulldogs	26 May 2017	Delisted	
Jess Gardner	Western Bulldogs	26 May 2017	Delisted	
Meg McDonald	Western Bulldogs	26 May 2017	Delisted	
Lauren Morecroft	Western Bulldogs	26 May 2017	Delisted	
Rebecca Neaves	Western Bulldogs	26 May 2017	Delisted	
Romy Timmins	Western Bulldogs	26 May 2017	Delisted	
Kate Tyndall	Western Bulldogs	26 May 2017	Delisted	
Lisa Williams	Western Bulldogs	26 May 2017	Delisted	

=== Free agency ===
A four-day free agency period was held from 29 May for clubs to secure non-signed players from other clubs.

2017 AFLW free agency period signings
Player	Date	Free agent type	Former club	New club	Ref
Kellie Gibson	29 May 2017	Delisted	Adelaide	Fremantle	
Jessica Anderson	29 May 2017	Delisted	Melbourne	Western Bulldogs	
Harriet Cordner	30 May 2017	Delisted	Melbourne	Melbourne	
Alex Williams	30 May 2017	Delisted	Greater Western Sydney	Fremantle	
Rebecca Privitelli	31 May 2017	Delisted	Carlton	Greater Western Sydney	

A second free agency period opened at the conclusion of the draft, allowing undrafted players to be signed. This period closed on 19 October, the day after the draft.

Player	Signed with	Ref
Rachel Ashley	Western Bulldogs	
Sophie Armitstead	Adelaide	
Melissa Freckleton	Greater Western Sydney	

=== Salary ===
AFLW players salaries are managed and paid in full by the AFL on behalf of the clubs. A pay deal struck between the league and the AFLPA in November 2016 set the 2018 season payment structure as follows:

	Marquee players	Priority players	Other players
Number	2	4	up to 24
Salary	$27,946	$12,846	$9,276

It is expected that these salaries will be renegotiated and increased, as the time commitment of players was found to be greater than expected during the 2017 season.

In addition, players are provided with playing boots and runners, an interstate travel allowance, income insurance, out-of-pocket medical expense coverage, and an allowance to pay for a carer for a child under 12 months of age when travelling interstate.

== Draft ==
A draft was held 18 October 2017. It operated with players nominating for a single state's draft pool and players only being eligible to be drafted by clubs operating in that state. Clubs concluded the draft period with a total of 30 players, 27 of these being senior listed and three of these being rookie players.

Final draft order

Round	Pick	Player	Drafted to	Recruited from	League	Notes
1	1	Isabel Huntington	Western Bulldogs	Melbourne Uni	VFL Women's	Traded from Collingwood; received from Greater Western Sydney
1	2	Stephanie Cain	Fremantle	Swan Districts	WAWFL	
1	3	Chloe Molloy	Collingwood	Diamond Creek	VFL Women's	Traded from Western Bulldogs
1	4	Monique Conti	Western Bulldogs	Melbourne Uni	VFL Women's	Traded from Collingwood
1	5	Jodie Hicks	Greater Western Sydney	Belconnen	AFL Canberra	Traded from Collingwood; received from Carlton
1	6	Eden Zanker	Melbourne	Bendigo Pioneers	TAC Cup	
1	7	Jordan Zanchetta	Brisbane	Yeronga	QWAFL	
1	8	Jessica Allan	Adelaide	Salisbury	Adelaide FL	
2	9	Darcy Guttridge	Collingwood	Cranbourne	VFL Women's	Traded from Greater Western Sydney
2	10	Evangeline Gooch	Fremantle	East Fremantle	WAWFL	
2	11	Jenna Bruton	Western Bulldogs	St Kilda Sharks	VFL Women's	
2	12	Georgia Gee	Carlton	Dandenong Stingrays	TAC Cup	Traded from Collingwood; received from Melbourne; received from Western Bulldogs
2	13	Iilish Ross	Collingwood	Murray Bushrangers	TAC Cup	Traded from Carlton
2	14	Maddy Guerin	Melbourne	Northern Knights	TAC Cup	
2	15	Arianna Clarke	Brisbane	Coolangatta	QWAFL	
2	16	Jasmyn Hewett	Adelaide	St Mary's	NTFL	
3	17	Tanya Hetherington	Greater Western Sydney	Diamond Creek	VFL Women's	
3	18	Jodie White	Fremantle	Coastal Titans	WAWFL	
3	19	Daria Bannister	Western Bulldogs	Launceston	TWL	
3	20	Sarah Dargan	Collingwood	Calder Cannons	TAC Cup	
3	21	Kristy Stratton	Collingwood	Box Hill Hawks	VFL Women's	Traded from Carlton
3	22	Tegan Cunningham	Melbourne	–	–	
3	23	Renee Cowan	Brisbane	Yeronga	QWAFL	
3	24	Eloise Jones	Adelaide	Morphettville Park	Adelaide FL	
4	25	Courtney Gum	Greater Western Sydney	Adelaide University	Adelaide FL	
4	26	Ashlee Atkins	Fremantle	East Fremantle	WAWFL	
4	27	Emma Mackie	Western Bulldogs	Box Hill Hawks	VFL Women's	
4	28	Sophie Li	Carlton	Adelaide University	Adelaide FL	Traded from Collingwood
4	29	Reni Hicks	Carlton	Diamond Creek	VFL Women's	
4	30	Claudia Whitfort	Melbourne	–	–	
4	31	Kalinda Howarth	Brisbane	Coolangatta	QWAFL	
4	32	Marijana Rajcic	Adelaide	Norwood	Adelaide FL	
5	33	Emily McGuire	Fremantle	Swan Districts	WAWFL	
5	34	Passed	Western Bulldogs	—	—	
5	35	Ashleigh Brazill	Collingwood	Collingwood Magpies Netball	Suncorp Super Netball	
5	36	Bridie Kennedy	Carlton	Cranbourne/Dandenong Stingrays	VFL Women's/TAC Cup	
5	37	Emma Pittman	Brisbane	University of Queensland	QWAFL	
5	38	Ruth Wallace	Adelaide	Adelaide University	Adelaide FL	
6	39	Phoebe Monahan	Greater Western Sydney	UNSW-Eastern Suburbs Stingrays	SWAFL	
6	40	Alicia Janz	Fremantle	Swan Districts	WAWFL	
6	41	Ruby Blair	Brisbane	Coolangatta	QWAFL	
6	42	Rheanne Lugg	Adelaide	Riverina Lions	AFL Canberra	
7	43	Philippa Smyth	Greater Western Sydney	Nelson Bay	BDAFL	
7	44	Leah Mascall	Fremantle	Coastal Titans	WAWFL	
7	45	Sophie Conway	Brisbane	Zillmere	QWAFL	
7	46	Passed	Adelaide	—	—	
8	47	Cora Staunton	Greater Western Sydney	–	–	
8	48	Jessy Keeffe	Brisbane	Yeronga	QWAFL	
9	49	Passed	Greater Western Sydney	—	—	

== Rookie draft ==
The rookie draft took place on 20 October 2017. Players qualify for the rookie draft if they are under the age of 21 or are crossing from another sport.

Pick	Player	Drafted to	Recruited from	League	Notes
1	Haneen Zreika	Greater Western Sydney	Auburn Giants	SWAFL	
2	Lisa Webb	Fremantle	Coastal Titans	WAWFL	
3	Naomi Ferres	Western Bulldogs	VU Western Spurs	VFL Women's	
4	Holly Whitford	Collingwood	Cranbourne	VFL Women's	
5	Tiahna Cochrane	Carlton	Bendigo Thunder	VWFL	
6	Anna Teague	Melbourne	Geelong Supercats	SEABL	
7	Gabby Collingwood	Brisbane	University of Queensland	QWAFL	
8	Calista Boyd	Adelaide	Wanderers	NTFL	
9	Tait Mackrill	Greater Western Sydney	Adelaide University	Adelaide FL	
10	Jade de Melo	Fremantle	East Fremantle	WAWFL	
11	Bonnie Toogood	Western Bulldogs	Mornington	SEFNL	
12	Katie-Jayne Grieve	Carlton	South Bunbury	SWFL	
13	Maddie Shevlin	Melbourne	Gungahlin	ACTWAFL	
14	Molly Ritson	Brisbane	Bond University	QWAFL	
15	Brianna Walling	Adelaide	Morphettville Park	Adelaide FL	
16	Beatrice Devlyn	Fremantle	South Fremantle	WAWFL	
17	Courtney Webb	Carlton	Launceston	TFL	
18	Krystal Scott	Brisbane	Bond University	QWAFL	
19	Tayla McAuliffe	Fremantle	Swan Districts	WAWFL	Promoted to senior list to replace Kirby Bentley who was put on the long-term injury list

== Rookie signings ==
Club	Rookie player	Other/former sport	Ref.
Adelaide	Becchara Palmer	Beach volleyball	
Carlton	Kerryn Harrington	Basketball	
Carlton	Maddi Gay	Netball	
Collingwood	Eliza Hynes	Beach Volleyball	
Collingwood	Georgie Parker	Field hockey	
Greater Western Sydney	Elle Bennetts	Netball	
Melbourne	Kate Hore	Basketball	
Melbourne	Erin Hoare	Netball	
Western Bulldogs	Kim Rennie	Basketball	
Western Bulldogs	Aisling Utri	Field Hockey	

== See also ==
- 2017 AFL draft
