= Lisa Webb =

Australian rules footballer and coach (born 1984)

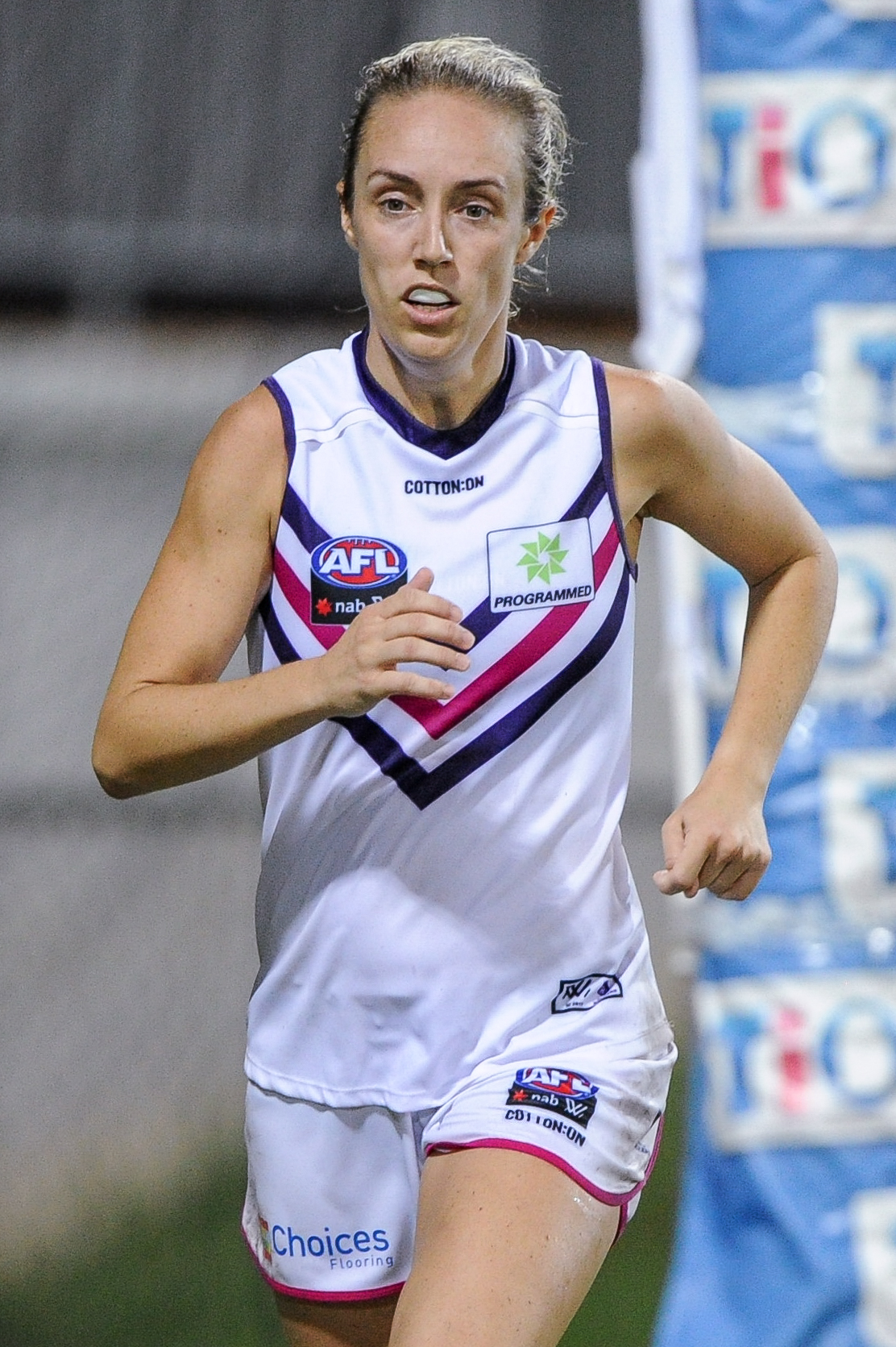
- Webb playing for Fremantle in January 2018

Personal information
- Born: 27 April 1984 (age 42)
- Original team: Coastal Titans (WAWFL)
- Draft: No. 2, 2017 AFL Women's rookie draft
- Debut: Round 2, 2018, Fremantle vs. Collingwood, at Optus Stadium
- Height: 171 cm (5 ft 7 in)
- Position: Midfield

Playing career^{1}
Years	Club	Games (Goals)
2018	Fremantle	6 (2)

Coaching career^{3}
Years	Club	Games (W–L–D)
2023–	Fremantle (W)	35 (19–16–0)
- ^{1} Playing statistics correct to the end of 2018.^{3} Coaching statistics correct as of 2025.

Lisa Webb (née Hughes; born 27 April 1984) is a former Australian rules footballer and current senior coach of the Fremantle Football Club in the AFL Women's (AFLW). She previously played six games for Fremantle in 2018, before retiring that same year.

== Early life ==
Webb placed second at the 2002–03 Australian Track & Field Championships competing in the heptathlon.

== Playing career ==
Webb was drafted by Fremantle with their first selection and the second selection overall in the 2017 AFL Women's rookie draft. She made her debut and was named one of Fremantle's best players in the thirteen point win over Collingwood at Optus Stadium in round 2 of the 2018 season. She played six games in 2018. She retired from playing at the end of the 2018 season.

== Coaching career ==
In 2019, Webb was appointed as the opposition and strategy coach for the Fremantle AFLW team. She remained an assistant until June 2022, when she relocated to Melbourne for family reasons. She served as the Western Bulldogs AFLW midfield coach in the AFLW's seventh season.

In February 2023, Webb was appointed senior coach of the Fremantle AFLW team on a three-year deal. During the 2023 AFL Women's season, she coached the Dockers to a 13th place ladder finish with a total of 4 wins and 6 losses. During the 2024 AFL Women's season, she coached the Dockers to a 5th place finish with 8 wins and 3 losses, and a return to finals for the first time since 2022. Fremantle's return to finals saw them defeat and eliminate the Essendon Bombers in an elimination final at Fremantle Oval in Perth. The Dockers were however defeated by the Adelaide Crows in the semi-finals the following week.

== Personal life ==
Webb is married to state league footballer Marc Webb. They have two sons.

Webb was a health and physical education teacher at Newman College in Perth up until June 2022.

== Statistics ==
=== Playing statistics ===
Updated to the end of the 2018 season.

Legend
G	Goals	K	Kicks	D	Disposals	T	Tackles
B	Behinds	H	Handballs	M	Marks

Season	Team	No.	Games	Totals							Averages (per game)							Votes
Season	Team	No.	Games	G	B	K	H	D	M	T	G	B	K	H	D	M	T	Votes
2018	Fremantle	16	6	2	2	68	19	87	19	18	0.3	0.3	11.3	3.2	14.5	3.2	3.0	0
Career			6	2	2	68	19	87	19	18	0.3	0.3	11.3	3.2	14.5	3.2	3.0	0

=== Coaching statistics ===
Updated to the end of the 2025 season.

Legend
W	Wins	L	Losses	D	Draws	%	Win percentage
†	Team qualified for finals

Season	Team	Ladder	Home-and-away season					Finals					Total																			
Season	Team	Ladder	Games	W	L	D	%	Games	W	L	D	%	Games	W	L	D	%															
2023	Fremantle	13 / 18	Games	W	L	D	%	Games	W	L	D	%	Games	W	L	D	%	10	4	6	0	40.0	0	—	—	—	—	10	4	6	0	40.0
2024	Fremantle	5 / 18^{†}	11	8	3	0	72.73	2	1	1	0	50	13	9	4	0	69.23															
2025	Fremantle	11 / 18	12	6	6	0	50.0	0	—	—	—	—	12	6	6	0	50.0															
Career			33	18	15	0	54.5	2	1	1	0	50.0	35	19	16	0	54.3															
