= Tayla McAuliffe =

Australian rules footballer (born 1999)

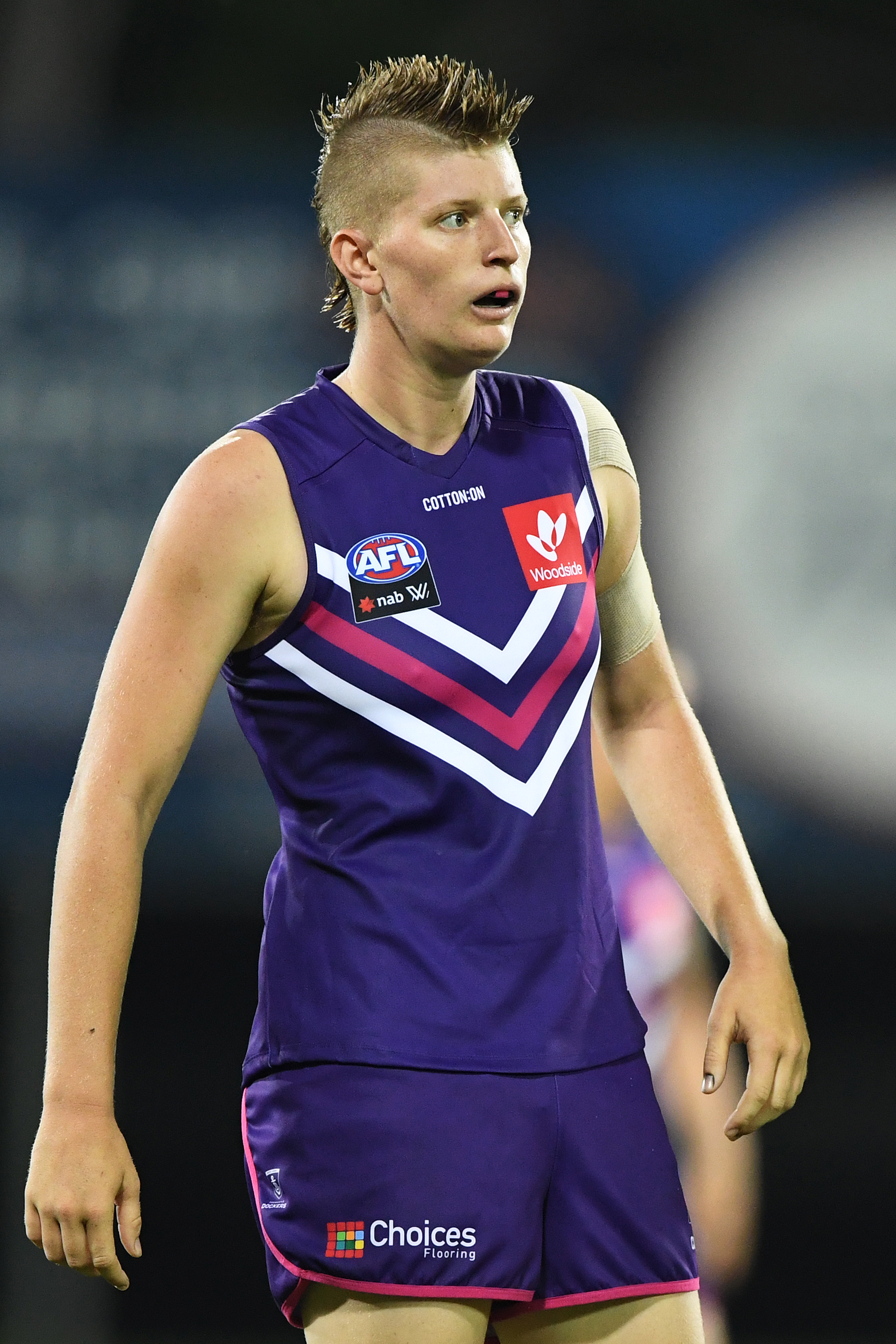
- McAuliffe playing for Fremantle in January 2019

Personal information
- Born: 15 March 1999 (age 27)
- Original team: Swan Districts (WAWFL)
- Draft: No. 19, 2017 AFL Women's rookie draft
- Debut: Round 5, 2018, Fremantle vs. Greater Western Sydney, at Fremantle Oval
- Height: 185 cm (6 ft 1 in)
- Position: Ruck

Playing career^{1}
Years	Club	Games (Goals)
2018–2019	Fremantle	3 (0)
- ^{1} Playing statistics correct to the end of the 2019 season.

Tayla McAuliffe (born 15 March 1999) is an Australian rules footballer who played for the Fremantle Football Club in the AFL Women's (AFLW). After being overlooked in the national draft days earlier, McAuliffe was eventually drafted by Fremantle with their fourth selection and 19th and final pick overall in the 2017 AFL Women's rookie draft. She made her debut in an 18-point loss to Greater Western Sydney at Fremantle Oval in round 5 of the 2018 season.
