= Evie Gooch =

Australian rules footballer

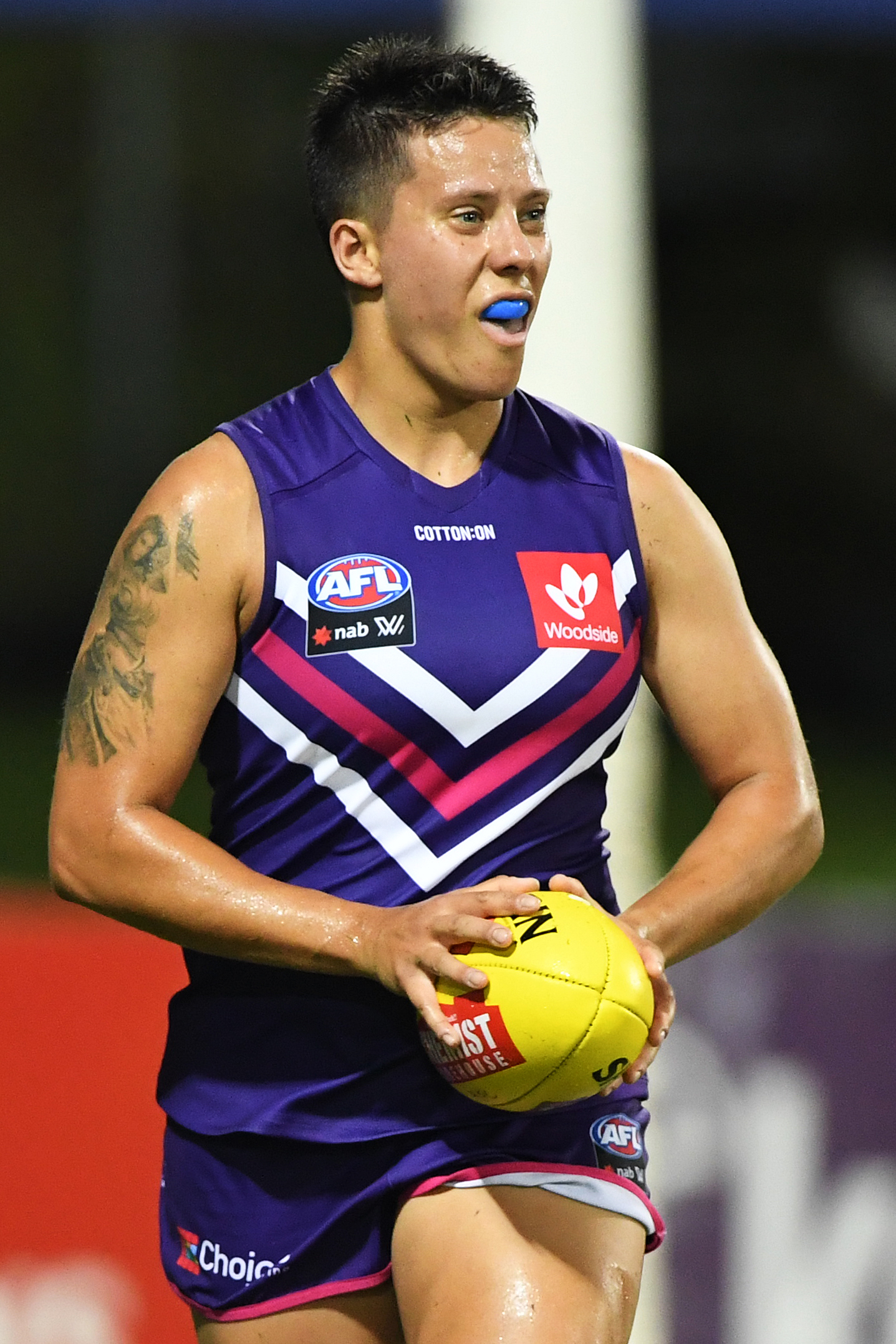
- Gooch playing for Fremantle in 2019

Personal information
- Born: 15 October 1995 (age 31)
- Original team: East Fremantle (WAWFL)
- Draft: No. 10, 2017 AFL Women's draft
- Debut: Round 1, 2018, Fremantle vs. Western Bulldogs, at VU Whitten Oval
- Height: 169 cm (5 ft 7 in)
- Weight: 70 kg (154 lb)
- Position: Defender

Playing career^{1}
Years	Club	Games (Goals)
2018–2021	Fremantle	23 (1)
2022–2024	West Coast	21 (1)
Total		44 (2)
- ^{1} Playing statistics correct to the end of the 2024 season.

Evangeline Gooch (born 15 October 1995) is an Australian rules footballer who played for the West Coast Eagles and Fremantle in the AFL Women's (AFLW).

== W-League career ==
In 2015–16 Gooch was a reserve goalkeeper for the Perth Glory soccer team. She was an unused substitute in five matches.

== AFL Women's career ==
Gooch was drafted by Fremantle with their second selection and tenth overall in the 2017 AFL Women's draft. She made her debut in the twenty-six point loss to the Western Bulldogs at VU Whitten Oval in the opening round of the 2018 season.

Gooch was traded to West Coast in the late stages of the 2021 trade period, on 9 June 2021, in exchange for pick 38. She made her debut for West Coast in round 1 of the 2022 season, against Fremantle. Following the 2024 AFL Women's season, Gooch announced her retirement.
