= Gabby Collingwood =

Australian rules footballer (born 1999)

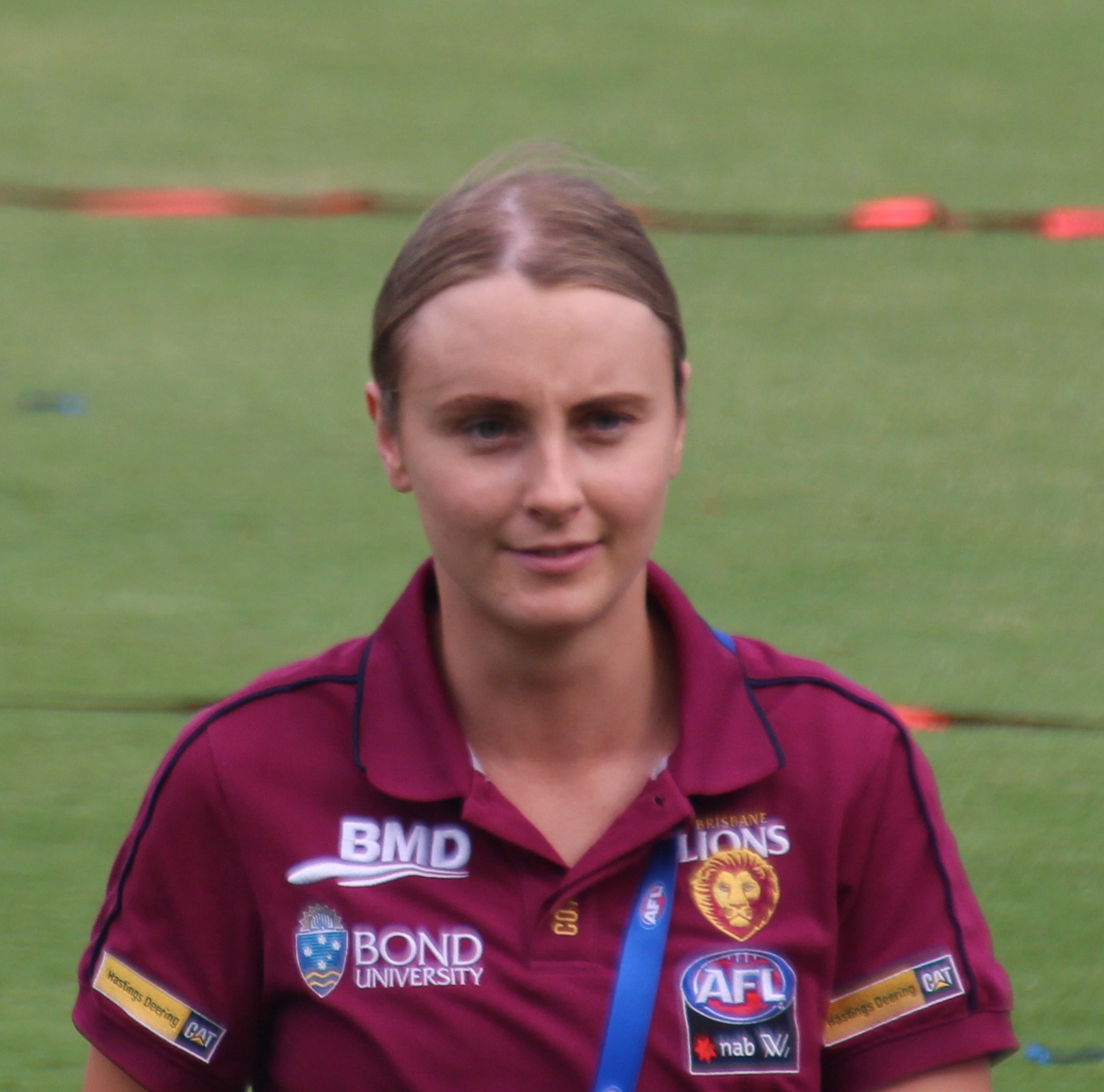
- Collingwood after the 2022 season 7 Grand Final

Personal information
- Full name: Gabrielle Collingwood
- Born: 15 January 1999 (age 27)
- Original team: University of Queensland (QWAFL)
- Draft: No. 7, 2017 AFL Women's rookie draft
- Debut: Round 1, 2018, Brisbane vs. Adelaide, at Norwood Oval
- Height: 163 cm (5 ft 4 in)
- Position: Midfielder

Playing career^{1}
Years	Club	Games (Goals)
2018–2022 (S7)	Brisbane	12 (0)
- ^{1} Playing statistics correct to the end of 2022 season 7.

Gabrielle "Gabby" Collingwood (born 15 January 1999) is an Australian rules footballer who played for the Brisbane Lions in the AFL Women's (AFLW).

== Junior and state football ==
Collingwood started playing Australian rules football in May 2011, with the Forest Lake Dragons. She played three years with the Jindalee Jags, including with the boys' squads. Following that she was selected to play with the under-17 Brisbane Flames in the 2012 Under 17 Youth Girls State Championships. She was also a member of the Sunfire Academy and of the Brisbane Lions Academy. Collingwood played for University of Queensland in the AFL Queensland Women's League (QWAFL). Collingwood represented Queensland at the 2017 AFL Women's Under 18 Championships and was selected for the initial 54-person All-Australian squad, but didn't make the final team.

== AFLW career ==
Collingwood was drafted by Brisbane with their first selection and seventh overall in the 2017 AFL Women's rookie draft. She said that Craig Starcevich is the best coach she ever had. She made her debut in Brisbane's twelve-point win over Adelaide at Norwood Oval in the opening round of the 2018 season, along with debutants Sophie Conway, Jordan Zanchetta, and Arianna Clarke. In April 2019, Collingwood re-signed with Brisbane for the 2020 season. In March 2023, Collingwood was delisted by Brisbane Lions.

== Personal life ==
At the age of nine, Collingwood went through surgery to remove a brain tumour from her right frontal lobe. While she was recovering, Brisbane Lions player Jonathan Brown visited her, which inspired her later to play Australian rules football. From a young age, she was a Brisbane Lions supporter.

== Statistics ==
Legend
G	Goals	K	Kicks	D	Disposals	T	Tackles
B	Behinds	H	Handballs	M	Marks

Season	Team	No.	Games	Totals							Averages (per game)							Votes
Season	Team	No.	Games	G	B	K	H	D	M	T	G	B	K	H	D	M	T	Votes
2018	Brisbane	28	4	0	0	3	5	8	2	5	0.0	0.0	0.8	1.3	2.0	0.5	1.3	0
2019	Brisbane	28	5	0	0	16	6	22	7	15	0.0	0.0	3.2	1.2	4.4	1.4	3.0	0
2020	Brisbane	7	2	0	1	13	3	16	11	4	0.0	0.5	6.5	1.5	8.0	5.5	2.0	0
2021	Brisbane	7	0	—	—	—	—	—	—	—	—	—	—	—	—	—	—	0
2023 (S6)	Brisbane	7	1	0	0	0	0	0	0	1	0.0	0.0	0.0	0.0	0.0	0.0	1.0	0
2022 (S7)	Brisbane	7	0	—	—	—	—	—	—	—	—	—	—	—	—	—	—	0
Career			12	0	1	32	14	46	20	25	0.0	0.1	2.7	1.2	3.8	1.7	2.1	0
