= Leah Mascall =

Australian rules footballer

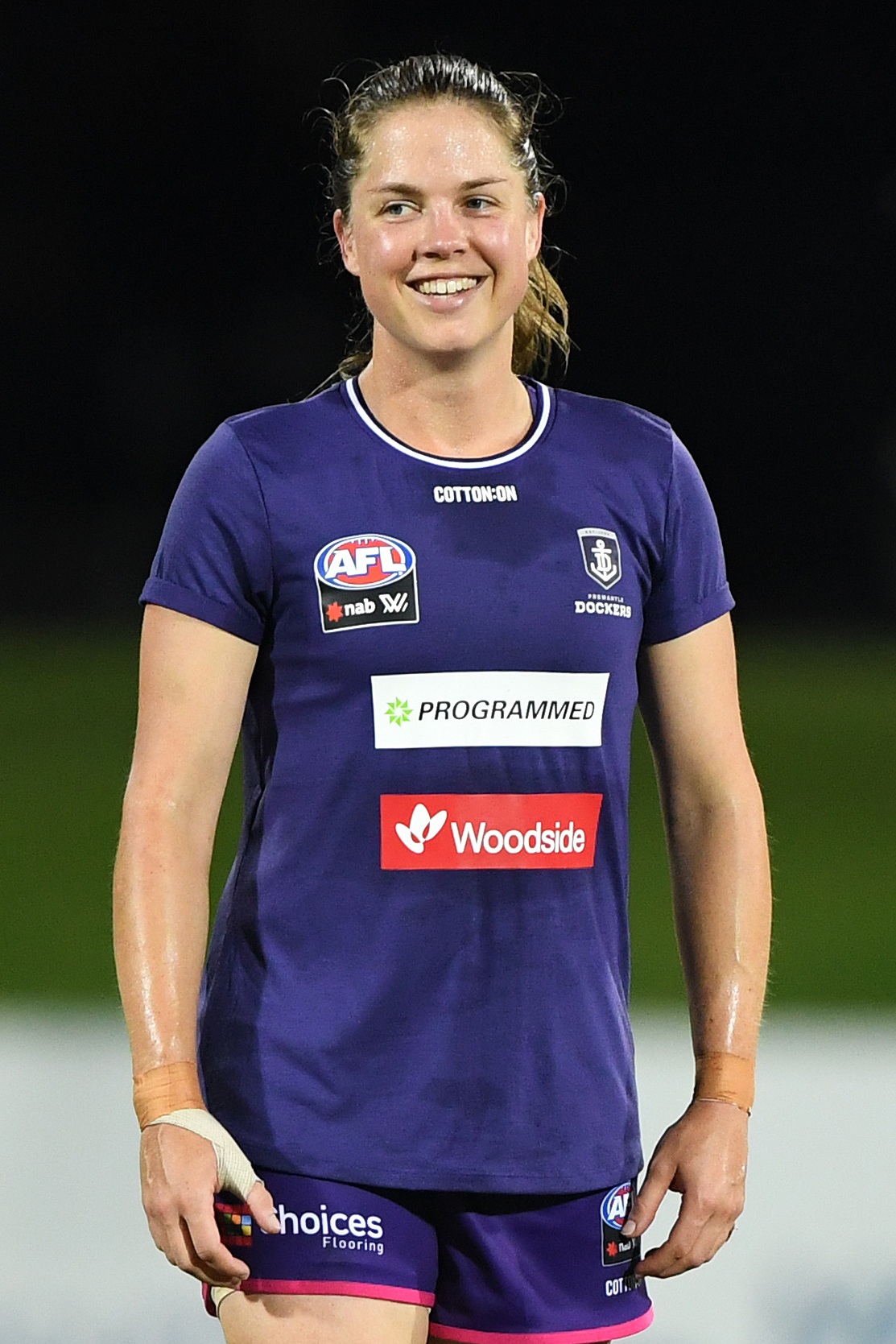
- Mascall playing for Fremantle in January 2019

Personal information
- Born: 23 May 1990 (age 36)
- Original team: Coastal Titans (WAWFL)
- Draft: No. 44, 2017 AFL Women's draft
- Debut: Round 1, 2018, Fremantle vs. Western Bulldogs, at VU Whitten Oval
- Height: 169 cm (5 ft 7 in)
- Position: Defender

Playing career^{1}
| Years | Club | Games (Goals) |
| 2018–2021 | Fremantle | 19 (0) |
- ^{1} Playing statistics correct to the end of the 2021 season.

Leah Mascall (born 23 May 1995) is a retired Australian rules footballer who played for the Fremantle Football Club in the AFL Women's (AFLW). Mascall was drafted by Fremantle with their seventh selection and forty-fourth overall in the 2017 AFL Women's draft. She made her debut in the twenty-six point loss to the Western Bulldogs at VU Whitten Oval in the opening round of the 2018 season. After an anterior cruciate ligament injury prevented her from playing in the 2021 AFL Women's season, Mascall retired in April 2021.
