= Kira Phillips =

Australian rules footballer (born 1995)

Personal information
- Born: 16 May 1995 (age 31)
- Original team: Peel Thunder (WAWFL)
- Draft: No. 45, 2016 AFL Women's draft
- Debut: Round 3, 2017, Fremantle vs. Greater Western Sydney, at Blacktown ISP Oval
- Height: 174 cm (5 ft 9 in)
- Position: Forward

Playing career^{1}
Years	Club	Games (Goals)
2017	Fremantle	5 (2)
- ^{1} Playing statistics correct to the end of 2017.

Kira Phillips (born 16 May 1995) is an Australian rules footballer who played for the Fremantle Football Club in the AFL Women's competition. Phillips was drafted by Fremantle with their sixth selection and forty-fifth overall in the 2016 AFL Women's draft. She made her debut in the draw against Greater Western Sydney at Blacktown ISP Oval in round three of the 2017 season. After her debut match, she played every match for the year to finish with five matches. She was delisted at the end of the 2017 season.
