= Jess Allan =

Australian rules footballer

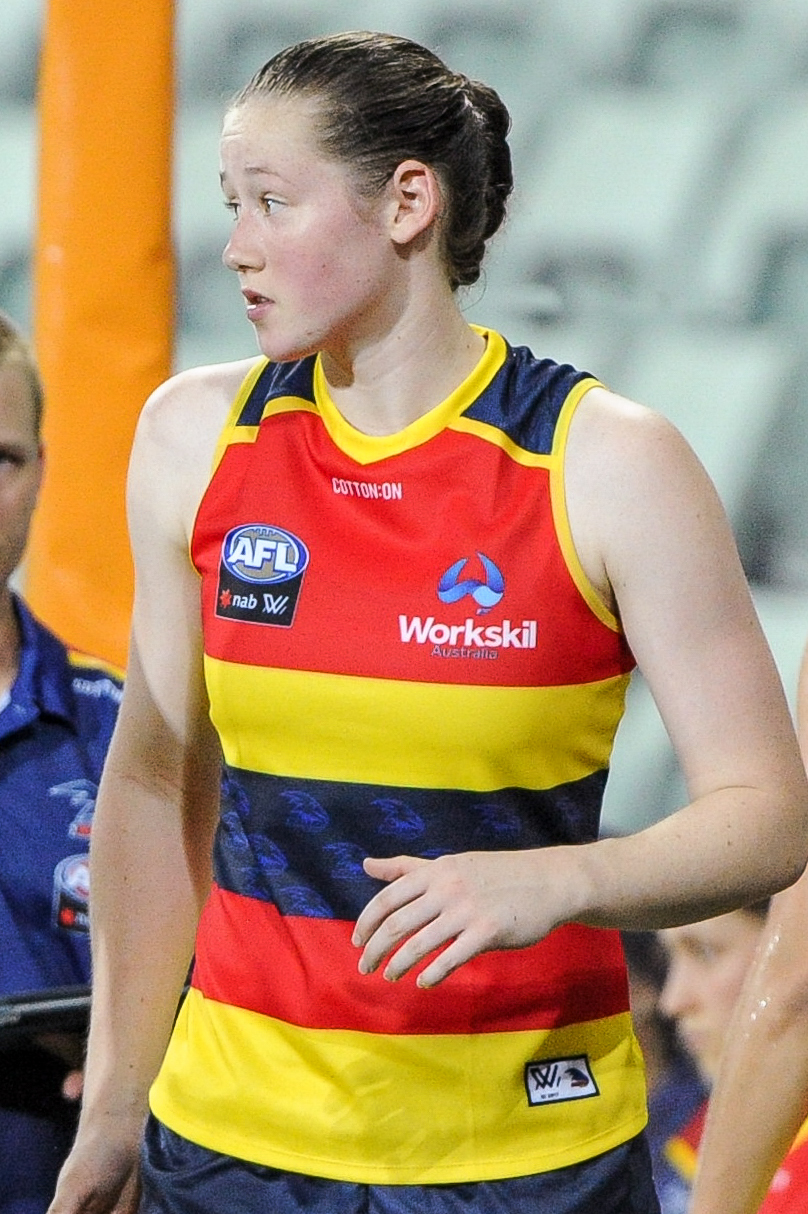
- Allan playing for Adelaide in 2018

Personal information
- Full name: Jessica Allan
- Born: 26 May 1999 (age 27)
- Original team: Salisbury (Adelaide FL)
- Draft: No. 8, 2017 AFL Women's draft
- Debut: Round 1, 2018, Adelaide vs. Brisbane, at Norwood Oval
- Height: 185 cm (6 ft 1 in)
- Position: Ruck

Club information
- Current club: Adelaide
- Number: 32

Playing career^{1}
Years	Club	Games (Goals)
2018–2019	Adelaide	4 (0)
2020–S7 (2022)	Greater Western Sydney	14 (0)
2023–	Adelaide	40 (4)
Total		58 (4)
- ^{1} Playing statistics correct to the end of the 2025 season.

Jessica Allan (born 26 May 1999) is an Australian rules footballer playing for Adelaide in the AFL Women's (AFLW). She is the sister of Adelaide player, Sarah Allan.

== Early life and career ==
Allan grew up in Beachport, South Australia, the daughter of former Central District Football Club player Keith Allan. She began playing football when she was five years old and before her AFLW career played for Salisbury in the South Australian Women's Football League.

Allan captained the Allies (a representative team consisting of players from South Australia, the Northern Territory and Tasmania) in the 2017 Under-18 National Championships and was named vice-captain of the All-Australian team from the tournament. She also played for Glenelg in the inaugural SANFL Women's League. In the 2017 AFLW Draft Combine she won the vertical running jump test and came sixth in the 20-metre sprint.

== AFLW career ==
Allan was drafted by Adelaide with their first selection and eighth overall in the 2017 AFL Women's draft. She made her debut in the twelve point loss to Brisbane at Norwood Oval in the opening round of the 2018 season.

After spending the 2019 season on the inactive list due to intensive training for the Australian Army, Allan was required to move to Canberra for her army career and was traded to Greater Western Sydney.

Allan played for Greater Western Sydney for two seasons and then spent two seasons on the inactive list during 2022 due to her army training. She was then required by the army to move back to Adelaide and was traded back to Adelaide.

== Player profile ==
Allan is a ruck with strong contested marking skills and vertical jump.

== Statistics ==
Updated to the end of the 2025 season.

Legend
G	Goals	K	Kicks	D	Disposals	T	Tackles
B	Behinds	H	Handballs	M	Marks	H/O	Hit-outs

Season	Team	No.	Games	Totals								Averages (per game)								Votes
Season	Team	No.	Games	G	B	K	H	D	M	T	H/O	G	B	K	H	D	M	T	H/O	Votes
2018	Adelaide	19	4	0	1	9	5	14	3	3	21	0.0	0.3	2.3	1.3	3.5	0.8	0.8	5.3	0
2019	Adelaide	19	0	—	—	—	—	—	—	—	—	—	—	—	—	—	—	—	—	—
2020	Greater Western Sydney	39	6	0	0	28	14	42	10	8	104	0.0	0.0	4.7	2.3	7.0	1.7	1.3	17.3	0
2021	Greater Western Sydney	39	8	0	0	17	25	42	7	6	120	0.0	0.0	2.1	3.1	5.3	0.9	0.8	15.0	0
2022 (S6)	Greater Western Sydney	32	0	—	—	—	—	—	—	—	—	—	—	—	—	—	—	—	—	—
2022 (S7)	Greater Western Sydney	32	0	—	—	—	—	—	—	—	—	—	—	—	—	—	—	—	—	—
2023	Adelaide	32	13	0	0	45	71	116	15	30	260	0.0	0.0	3.5	5.5	8.9	1.2	2.3	20.0	0
2024	Adelaide	32	14	2	2	48	86	134	20	16	475	0.1	0.1	3.4	6.1	9.6	1.4	1.1	33.9	4
2025	Adelaide	32	13	2	0	46	64	110	20	25	261	0.2	0.0	3.5	4.9	8.5	1.5	1.9	20.1	1
Career			58	4	3	193	265	458	75	88	1241	0.1	0.1	3.3	4.6	7.9	1.3	1.5	21.4	5
