= Tiahna Cochrane =

Australian rules footballer

Personal information
- Born: 9 July 1998 (age 28)
- Original team: Bendigo Thunder (VFL Women's)
- Draft: No. 5, 2017 AFL Women's rookie draft
- Debut: Round 6, 2018, Carlton vs. Melbourne, at Ikon Park
- Height: 166 cm (5 ft 5 in)
- Position: Midfielder

Playing career^{1}
Years	Club	Games (Goals)
2018	Carlton	1 (0)
- ^{1} Playing statistics correct to the end of the 2018 season.

Tiahna Cochrane (born 9 July 1998) is an Australian rules footballer who played for the Carlton Football Club in the AFL Women's (AFLW). After being passed over in the national draft some days earlier, Cochrane was ultimately drafted by Carlton with the club's first selection and the fifth pick overall in the 2017 AFL Women's rookie draft. She made her debut in a 35-point loss to Melbourne at Ikon Park in round 6 of the 2018 season. Her great uncle is Carlton team of the century player Trevor Keogh. She was delisted by Carlton at the end of the 2018 season.
