= Sophie Armitstead =

Australian rules footballer

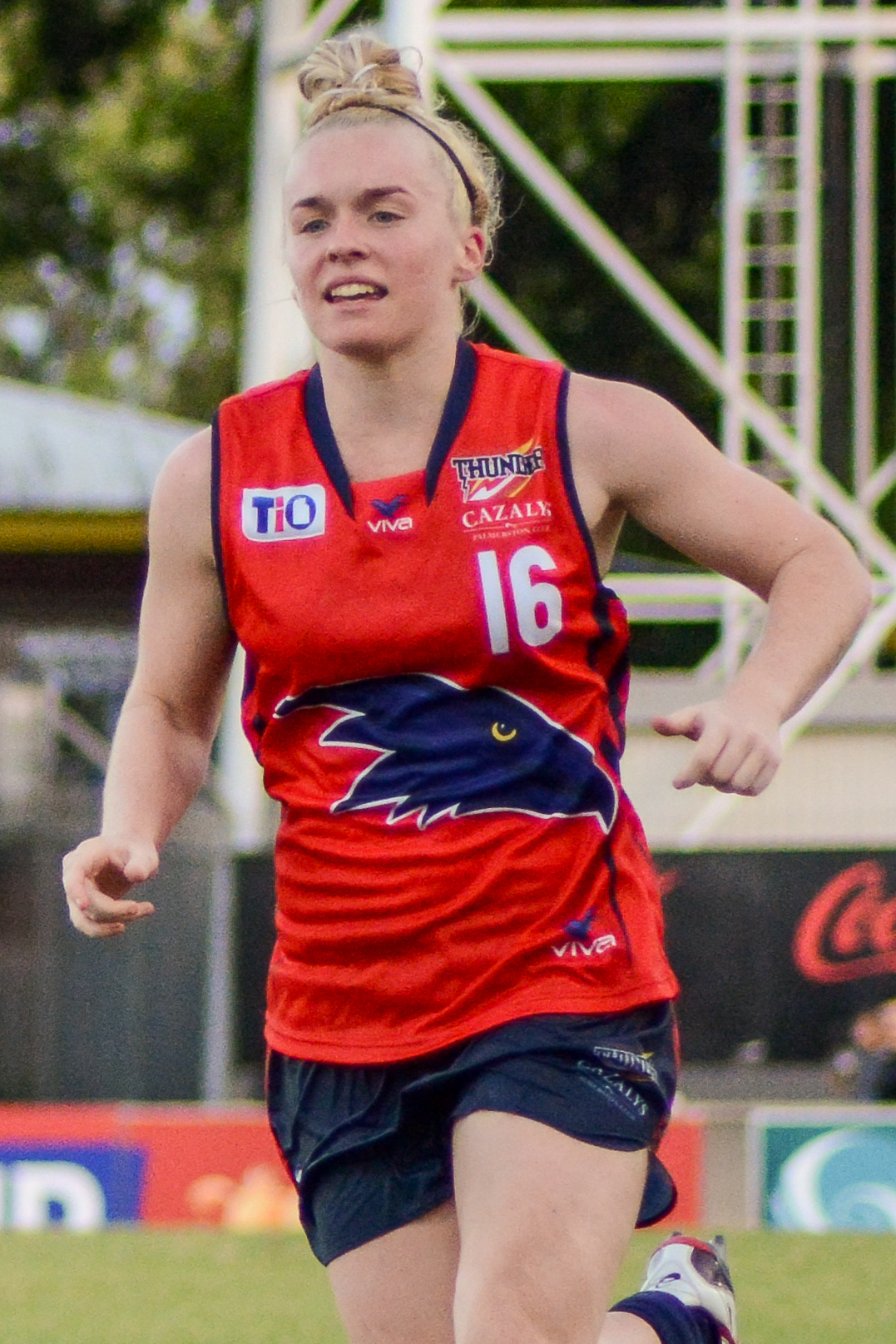
- Sophie Armitstead playing for Adelaide in January 2017

Personal information
- Born: 27 October 1999 (age 27)
- Original team: Wanderers (NTFL)
- Draft: No. 55, 2016 AFL Women's draft
- Debut: Round 2, 2017, Adelaide vs. Western Bulldogs, at VU Whitten Oval
- Height: 168 cm (5 ft 6 in)
- Position: Defender / midfielder

Playing career^{1}
Years	Club	Games (Goals)
2017–2018	Adelaide	4 (0)
- ^{1} Playing statistics correct to the end of the 2018 season.

Sophie Armitstead (born 27 October 1999) is an Australian rules footballer who played for the Adelaide Football Club in the AFL Women's competition.

== Early life and career ==
Armitstead won the 2015 NTFL Women's Rising Star Award playing for Wanderers, but her career before the AFLW was soured by knee injuries, as she injured her ACL in 2012 and tore her meniscus in 2015, both in the same knee.

== AFLW career (2017–18) ==
Armitstead was drafted by Adelaide with their seventh selection and fifty-fifth overall in the 2016 AFL Women's draft. She made her debut in the twenty-five point win against the Western Bulldogs at VU Whitten Oval in round two of the 2017 season, but she tore her meniscus in her left knee during the match, which forced her to miss the remainder of the season. Due to her knee injury, the club announced in May that she was not offered a contract for the 2018 season, however in October it was announced that she would return to the club for the 2018 season under free agency rules. She was delisted again by Adelaide at the end of the 2018 season.
