= Sophie Li =

Australian rules footballer (born 1988)

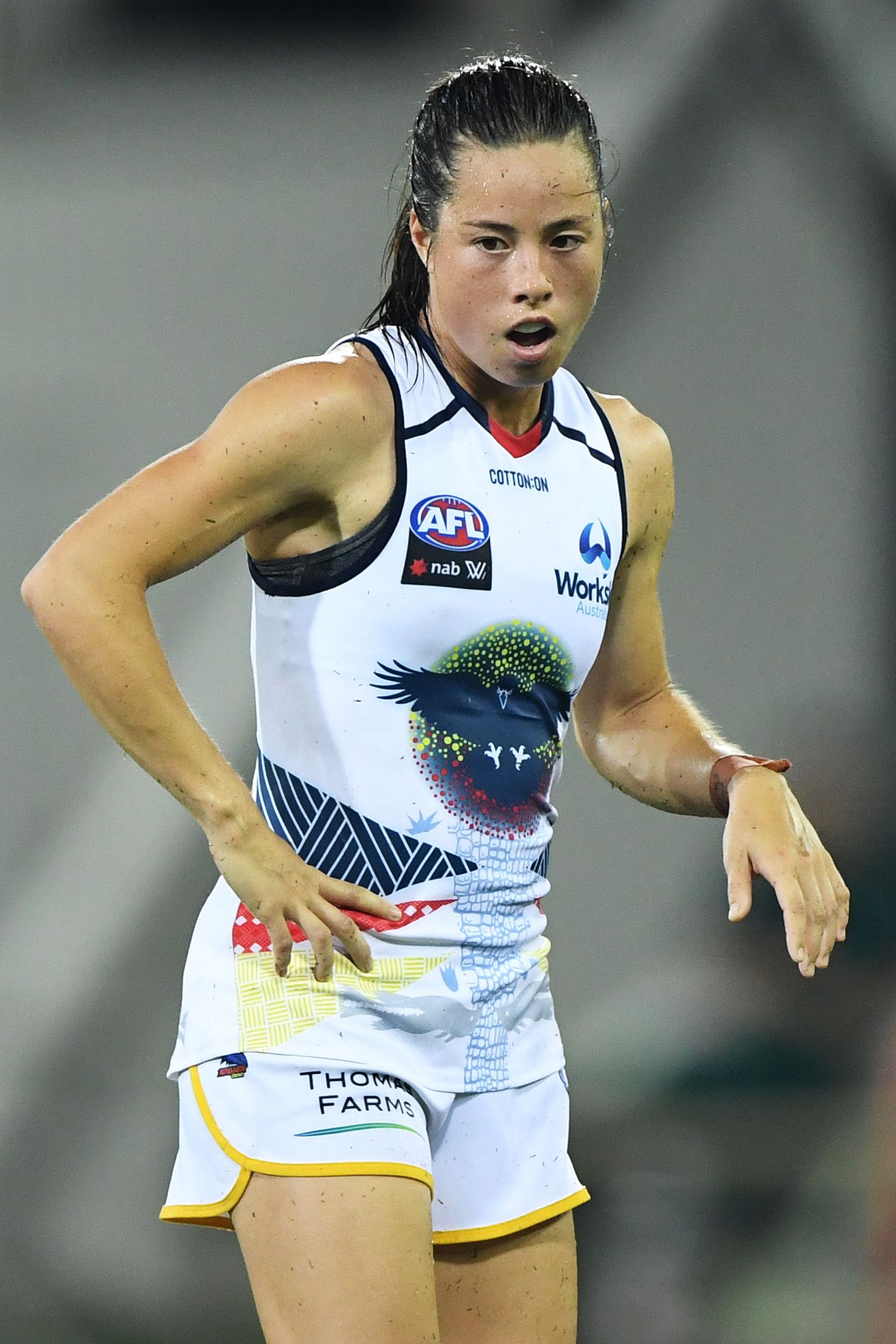
- Li playing for Adelaide in January 2019

Personal information
- Born: 31 March 1988 (age 38); Adelaide, South Australia
- Original team: Adelaide University (Adelaide FL)
- Draft: No. 28, 2017 AFL Women's draft
- Debut: Round 1, 2018, Carlton vs. Collingwood, at Ikon Park
- Height: 165 cm (5 ft 5 in)
- Position: Midfielder

Playing career^{1}
Years	Club	Games (Goals)
2018	Carlton	7 (0)
2019–2020	Adelaide	14 (1)
Total		21 (1)
- ^{1} Playing statistics correct to the end of the 2020 season.

Career highlights
- AFLW Premiership player: 2019

Sophie Li (born 31 March 1988) is a retired Australian rules footballer. She played in the AFL Women's (AFLW) for Carlton and for Adelaide.

== Early life ==
Li was born in Adelaide, to parents from Hong Kong and grew up supporting Adelaide Football Club from a young age. She played basketball, cricket, and Gaelic football before starting to play Australian rules football in 2015.

== State football ==
In 2017, Li had an exceptional season with Norwood in the SANFL Women's League (SANFLW). She helped Norwood beat North Adelaide in the Grand Final at Unley Oval, winning the best on ground award winning 23 disposals and kicking two goals. Her performance in the season earned her the runner-up for the Best and Fairest award, shared with North Adelaide's Chloe Scheer. In October 2017, she played with Adelaide University, helping them claim the Adelaide Footy League premiership and won the club's best and fairest award.

== AFL Women's career ==
=== Carlton ===
Li was drafted by Carlton with their second selection and twenty-eighth overall in the 2017 AFL Women's draft. Carlton's coach, Damien Keeping, said that she "is a prolific ball winner and will be an asset to our midfield". She chose to wear the number 35 guernsey as a tribute to Patrick Dangerfield, who she models her game on. She made her debut in the eight point win against Collingwood at Ikon Park in the opening round of the 2018 season. Li appeared in every game of her debut season, but chose to leave Carlton so she could return to her home state with her partner and for her work, even after re-signing for the 2019 season. Carlton received the forty-second pick in the 2018 AFL Women's draft as compensation, but were disappointed to lose her, with Nicole Graves, Carlton's General Manager of Women's Football, saying "Soph is a terrific player and person so we'll be sad to see her go, but we understand her decision and reasoning behind wanting to return to Adelaide".

=== Adelaide ===
Li joined Adelaide in September 2018, so that she could return to her work as a paramedic in Adelaide. She made her debut for Adelaide against Western Bulldogs at Norwood Oval in the opening round of the 2019 season. She helped Adelaide claim their second premiership, playing every match in the season and helping beat her former club Carlton at Adelaide Oval in the Grand Final on her birthday. In July 2020, Li announced her retirement from the AFLW.

== Personal life ==
She works in Adelaide as a paramedic.

Li refers to herself as gay.
