= Emma Pittman =

- Born: 29 December 1992 (age 33)
- Height: 165 cm (5 ft 5 in)
Australian rules football career
Personal information
- Born: Mackay, Queensland
- Original team: University of Queensland (QWAFL)
- Draft: No. 37, 2017 AFL Women's draft
- Debut: Round 4, 2018, Brisbane vs. Fremantle, at South Pine Sports Complex
- Position: Defender
Playing career^{1}
Years	Club	Games (Goals)
2018–2019	Brisbane	8 (0)
2020–2022 (S6)	Gold Coast	2 (0)
Total		10 (0)
- ^{1} Playing statistics correct to the end of the 2022 season.
Association football career
- Position: Forward
Senior career*
Years	Team	Apps	(Gls)
2011–2012	The Gap	35	(?)
2012–2013	Brisbane Roar	4	(0)
2013	The Gap	17	(11)
2014	Mitchelton	19	(7)
2015	University of Queensland	9	(2)
2015–2016	Eastern Suburbs	25	(17)
- * Club domestic league appearances and goals

Emma Pittman (born 29 December 1992) is a former Australian rules footballer who played for Brisbane and Gold Coast in the AFL Women's (AFLW). She also has a history in association football, having played four matches for the Brisbane Roar in the W-League.

== Early life ==
Pittman was born and raised in Mackay, Queensland but moved to Brisbane at the age of 15 following the tragic loss of her mother. She began playing association football when she moved to Brisbane in an attempt to make friends but her ability soon shone through as she made her way through representative teams. At the age of 20, she was signed by the Brisbane Roar's W-League team.

== Association football ==
Pittman played four matches as a striker including in two starts for the Brisbane Roar in the W-League in the 2012–13 season.

== Australian rules football ==
Pittman was a late starter to Australian rules football, only taking the game up in adulthood. She first learnt the game while playing with local club Coorparoo before joining the University of Queensland in the AFL Queensland Women's League. In 2017 she earned selection in the league's team of the year and also represented her state in an exhibition match against Western Australia.

She was later drafted by Brisbane with the club's fifth pick and the 37th selection overall in the 2017 AFL Women's draft. Pittman made her AFLW debut in the Lions' round 4, 2018 win over Fremantle at South Pine Sports Complex.

In April 2019, Pittman joined expansion club Gold Coast. Pittman struggled with injury at the Suns, suffering two ACL injuries and missing the entirety of the 2020 season. She played two games at the backend of the 2021 season, before being registered as an inactive player for the first season of 2022 to focus on her hospitality business. At the end of that season, she was delisted.

== See also ==
- List of players who have converted from one football code to another
