= Maddy Guerin =

Australian rules footballer

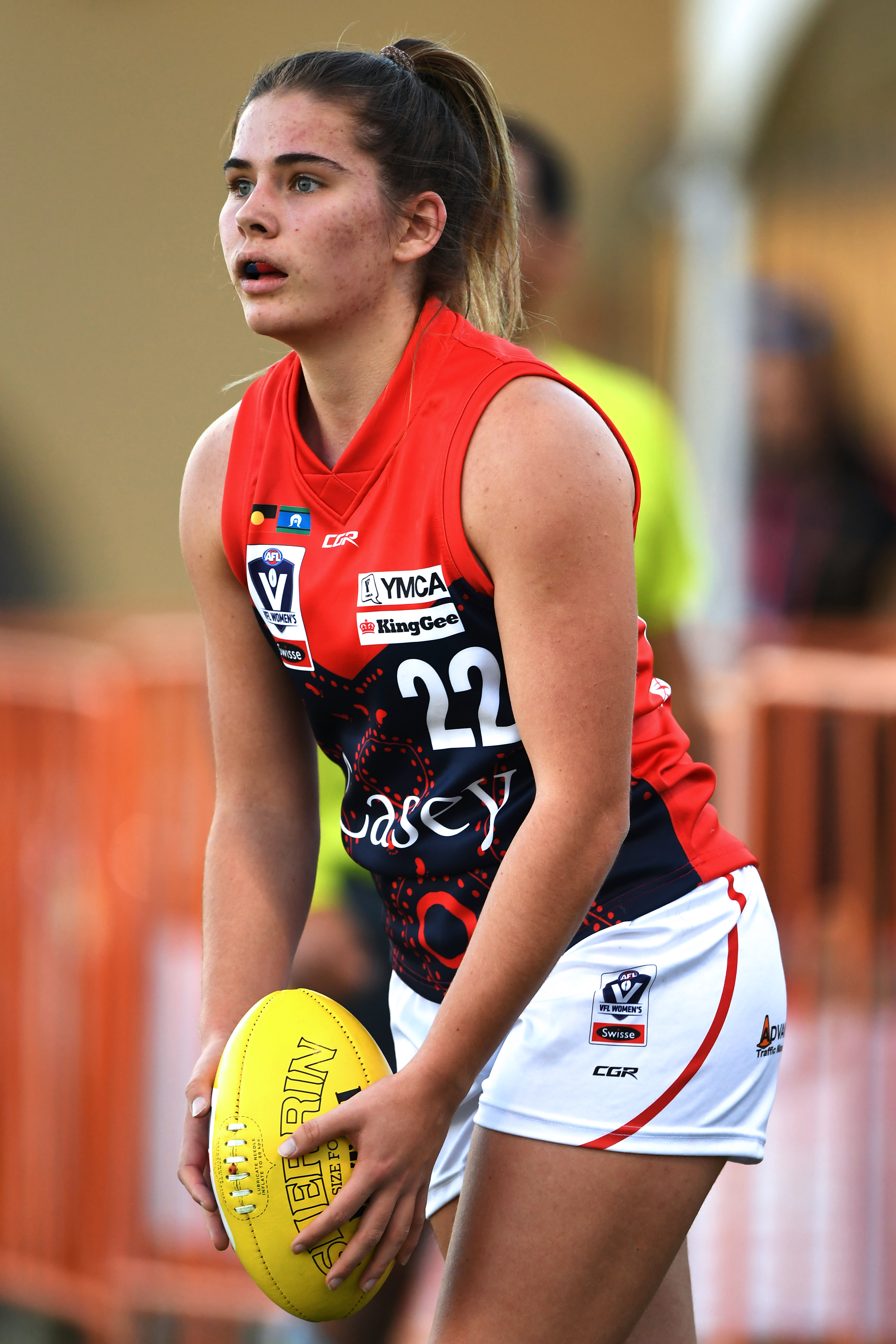
- Guerin playing for Casey Demons in July 2019

Personal information
- Full name: Madeleine Guerin
- Born: 25 October 1999 (age 27)
- Original team: Northern Knights (TAC Cup)
- Draft: No. 14, 2017 AFL Women's draft
- Debut: Round 1, 2018, Melbourne vs. Greater Western Sydney, at Casey Fields
- Height: 172 cm (5 ft 8 in)
- Position: Midfielder

Club information
- Current club: Carlton
- Number: 18

Playing career^{1}
Years	Club	Games (Goals)
2018–2020	Melbourne	6 (0)
2021–	Carlton	26 (2)
Total		32 (2)
- ^{1} Playing statistics correct to the end of the 2021 season.

Madeleine Guerin (born 25 October 1999) is an Australian rules footballer playing for the Carlton Football Club in the AFL Women's (AFLW).

Guerin was drafted by the Melbourne Football Club with their second selection and fourteenth overall in the 2017 AFL Women's draft.

She made her debut in the six point win against Greater Western Sydney at Casey Fields in the opening round of the 2018 season.

Following the conclusion of the 2020 season both Guerin and fellow Demon Elise O'Dea were traded to the Carlton Football Club in exchange for Pick 15 in the 2020 NAB AFLW Draft.

== Statistics ==
Statistics are correct to the end of the 2024 season.

Legend
G	Goals	K	Kicks	D	Disposals	T	Tackles
B	Behinds	H	Handballs	M	Marks

Season	Team	No.	Games	Totals							Averages (per game)							Votes
Season	Team	No.	Games	G	B	K	H	D	M	T	G	B	K	H	D	M	T	Votes
2018	Melbourne	22	1	0	0	4	1	5	0	1	0.0	0.0	4.0	1.0	5.0	0.0	1.0	0
2019	Melbourne	22	3	0	1	17	7	24	4	7	0.0	0.3	5.7	2.3	8.0	1.3	2.3	0
2020	Melbourne	22	2	0	0	1	4	5	0	1	0.0	0.0	0.5	2.0	2.5	0.0	0.5	0
2021	Carlton	18	6	0	0	47	8	55	14	12	0.0	0.0	7.8	1.3	9.2	2.3	2.0	-
2022 (S6)	Carlton	18	6	0	1	56	18	74	12	22	0.0	0.1	9.3	3.0	12.3	2.0	3.7	-
2022 (S7)	Carlton	18	3	0	0	12	8	20	3	13	0.0	0.0	4.0	2.7	6.7	1.0	4.3	-
2024	Carlton	18	11	2	4	149	55	204	29	79	0.2	0.4	13.5	5.0	18.5	2.6	7.2	-
Career			32	2	6	286	101	387	62	135	0.1	0.2	8.9	3.2	12.1	1.9	4.2	
