= Jessica Anderson (footballer) =

Australian rules footballer

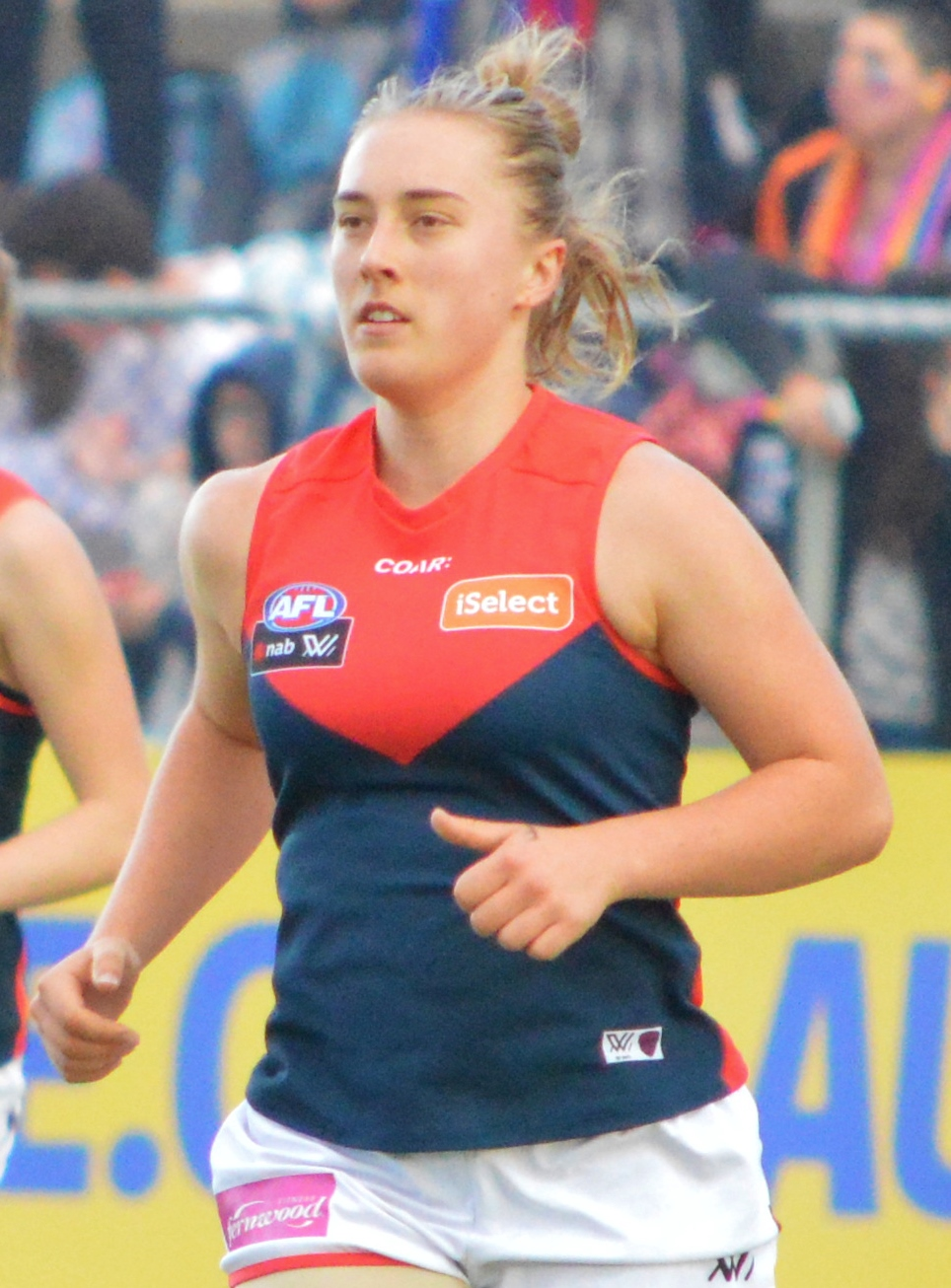
- Anderson playing for Melbourne in February 2017

Personal information
- Born: 16 November 1997 (age 28)
- Original team: Melbourne University (VFL Women's)
- Draft: No. 105, 2016 AFL Women's draft
- Debut: Round 1, 2017, Melbourne vs. Brisbane, at Casey Fields
- Height: 177 cm (5 ft 10 in)
- Position: Forward

Playing career^{1}
Years	Club	Games (Goals)
2017	Melbourne	5 (1)
2018	Western Bulldogs	1 (0)
Total		6 (1)
- ^{1} Playing statistics correct to the end of the 2018 season.

Jessica Anderson (born 16 November 1997) is an Australian rules footballer who played for the Melbourne Football Club and Western Bulldogs in the AFL Women's (AFLW).

== AFL Women's career ==
=== Melbourne ===
Anderson was drafted by Melbourne with their fourteenth selection and 105th overall in the 2016 AFL Women's draft. She made her debut in the fifteen point loss to Brisbane at Casey Fields in the opening round of the 2017 season. She played the first five matches of the season before being omitted for the round six match against Adelaide at TIO Stadium in round six. She did not return for the remainder of the season to finish with five matches overall. Anderson was not retained on Melbourne's list at the end of the season and was subsequently delisted in May 2017.

=== Western Bulldogs ===
Anderson was signed as a free agent by Western Bulldogs on 29 May, prior to the 2017 AFL Women's draft. She made her Western Bulldogs debut in round 3 of the following year, in a seven-point loss to Adelaide at Norwood Oval. She was delisted by the Western Bulldogs at the end of the 2018 season.
