= Tanya Hetherington =

Australian rules footballer

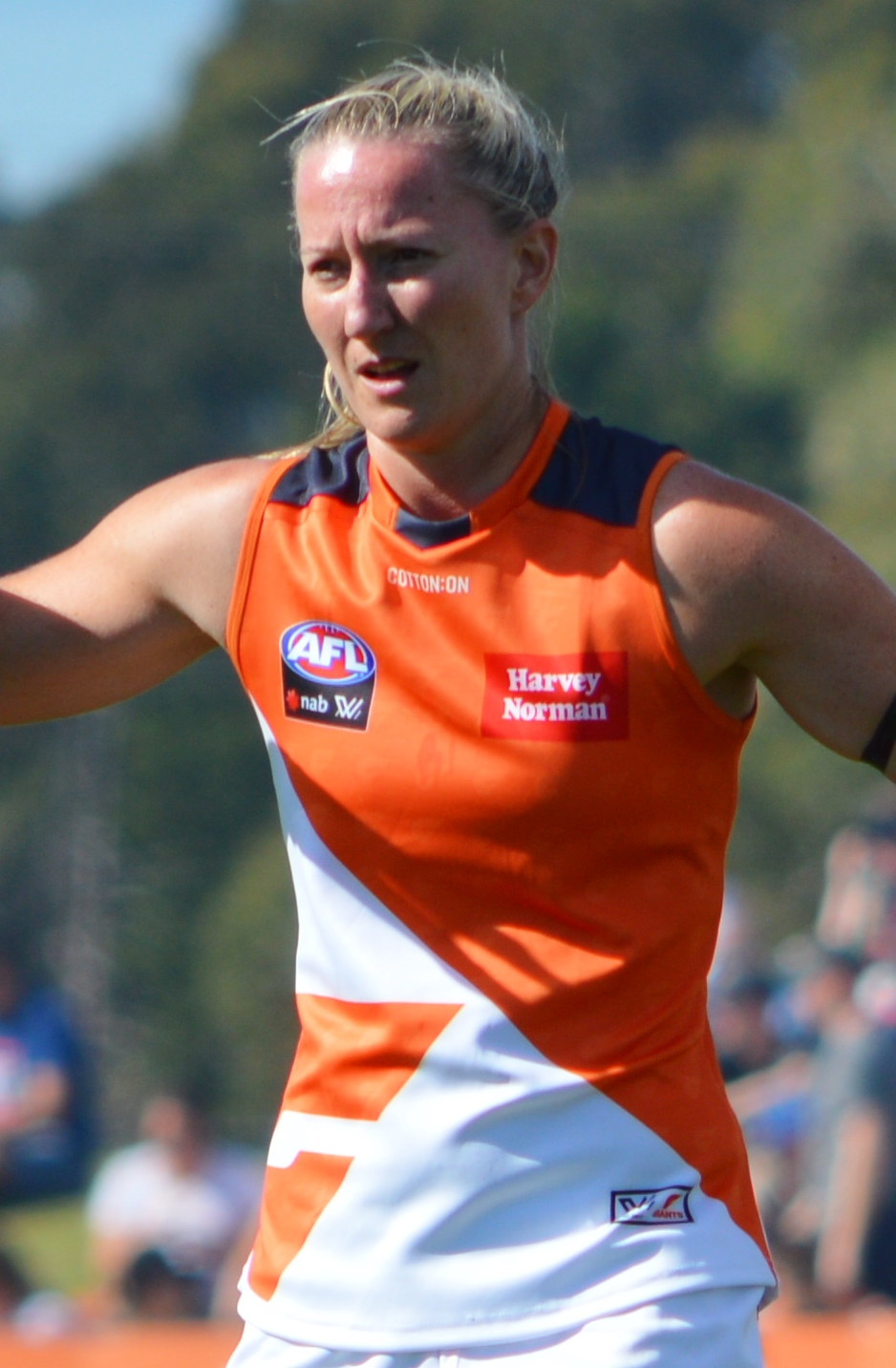
- Hetherington playing for Greater Western Sydney in February 2018

Personal information
- Born: 14 April 1985 (age 41)
- Original team: Diamond Creek (VFL Women's)
- Draft: No. 17, 2017 AFL Women's draft
- Debut: Round 1, 2018, Greater Western Sydney vs. Melbourne, at Casey Fields
- Height: 176 cm (5 ft 9 in)
- Position: Defender

Playing career^{1}
Years	Club	Games (Goals)
2018–S7 (2022)	Greater Western Sydney	46 (0)
- ^{1} Playing statistics correct to the end of the S7 (2022) season.

Tanya Hetherington (born 14 April 1985) is a retired Australian rules footballer who played for the Greater Western Sydney Giants in the AFL Women's competition.

Hetherington played state league football with Diamond Creek in the Victorian Women's Football League and later in the VFL Women's competition. In 2015 she suffered a major knee injury and went un-selected in the 2016 AFL Women's draft somewhat as a result. Hetherington was drafted by Greater Western Sydney with their third pick and the seventeenth selection overall in the 2017 AFL Women's draft. She made her debut in the six point loss to Melbourne at Casey Fields in the opening round of the 2018 season. Hetherington announced her retirement in October 2022.
