= Ashlee Atkins =

Australian rules footballer

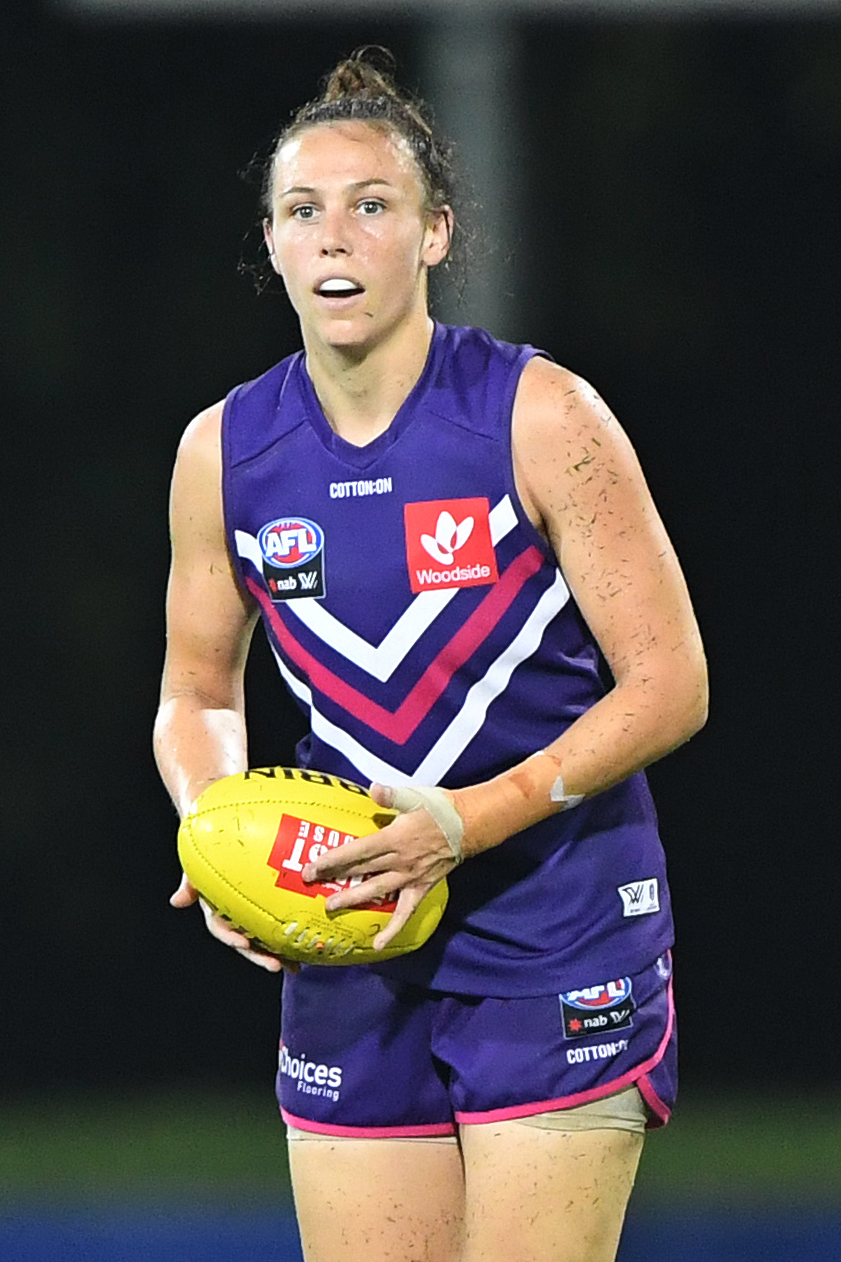
- Atkins playing for Fremantle in January 2019

Personal information
- Born: 2 April 1993 (age 33)
- Original team: East Fremantle (WAWFL)
- Draft: No. 26, 2017 AFL Women's draft
- Debut: Round 1, 2018, Fremantle vs. Western Bulldogs, at VU Whitten Oval
- Height: 165 cm (5 ft 5 in)
- Weight: 69 kg (152 lb)
- Position: Midfielder

Playing career^{1}
Years	Club	Games (Goals)
2018–2019	Fremantle	13 (6)
2020–2022	West Coast	23 (3)
S7 (2022)	Gold Coast	5 (1)
Total		41 (10)
- ^{1} Playing statistics correct to the end of the S7 (2022) season.

Ashlee Atkins (born 2 April 1993) is a retired Australian rules footballer who played for Gold Coast Suns in the AFL Women's (AFLW). She previously played 13 matches for Fremantle and 23 matches for West Coast. Atkins was drafted by Fremantle with their fourth selection and twenty-sixth overall in the 2017 AFL Women's draft. She made her debut in the twenty-six point loss to the Western Bulldogs at VU Whitten Oval in the opening round of the 2018 season. In April 2019, she signed with expansion club, West Coast. It was revealed Atkins signed on with West Coast on 25 June 2021. In May 2022, West Coast delisted Atkins. In June 2022, Gold Coast had confirmed they had signed Atkins. On 11 November 2022, she announced her retirement from the AFL.

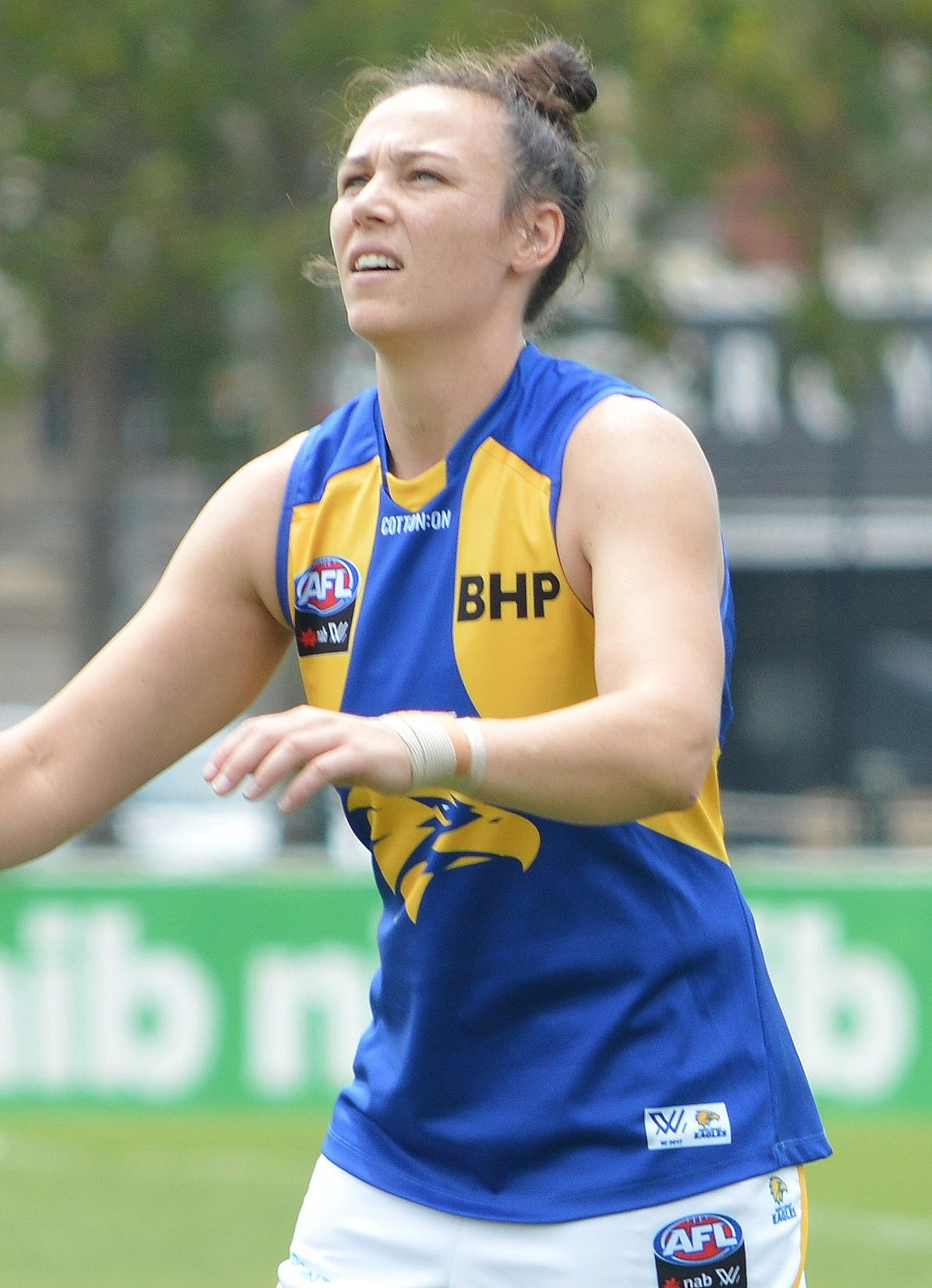
Atkins playing for West Coast in January 2020
