= Katie-Jayne Grieve =

Australian rules footballer (born 1997)

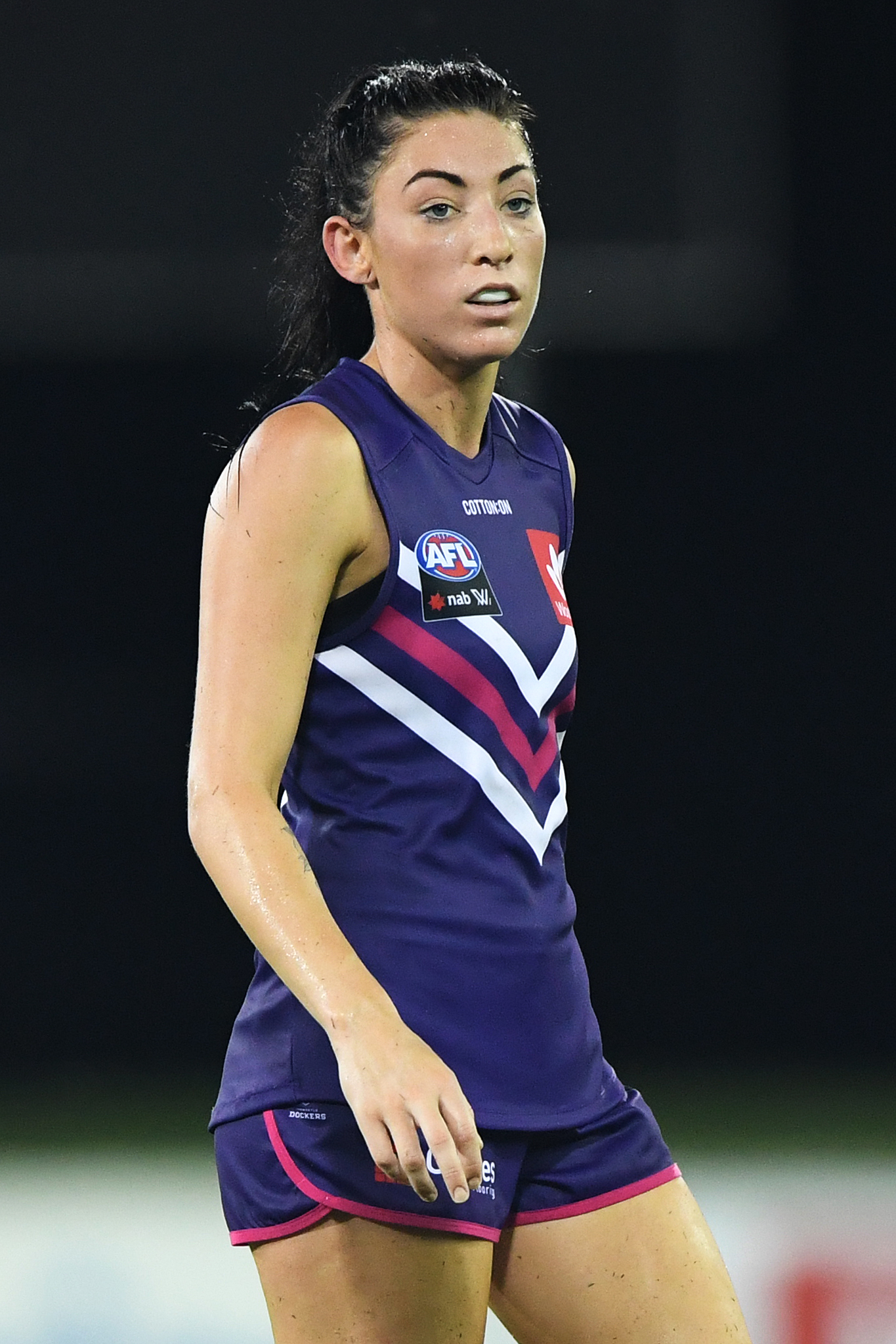
- Grieve playing for Fremantle in January 2019

Personal information
- Full name: Katie-Jayne Grieve
- Born: 8 March 1997 (age 29); Australia
- Original team: South Bunbury (SWFL)
- Draft: No. 12, 2017 AFL Women's rookie draft
- Debut: Round 3, 2018, Carlton vs. Brisbane, at Ikon Park
- Height: 168 cm (5 ft 6 in)
- Position: Midfielder

Playing career^{1}
Years	Club	Games (Goals)
2018	Carlton	2 (0)
2019–2021	Fremantle	14 (3)
Total		16 (3)
- ^{1} Playing statistics correct to the end of the 2021 season.

Katie-Jayne Grieve (born 8 March 1997) is an Australian rules footballer who played for Carlton and Fremantle in the AFL Women's (AFLW).

== AFLW career ==
After being passed up on in the national draft less than a week earlier, Grieve was ultimately drafted by Carlton with the club's second pick and the twelfth selection overall in the same year's rookie draft. She made her debut in a 22-point loss to Brisbane at Ikon Park in the third round of the 2018 season. She was delisted by Carlton at the end of the 2018 season.

In October 2018, after leaving Carlton, Grieve joined Fremantle as a free agent. In June 2021, Fremantle delisted Grieve who played 14 games for the club.
