= Reni Hicks =

Australian rules footballer (born 1998)

Personal information
- Born: 7 September 1998 (age 28)
- Original team: Diamond Creek (VFL Women's)
- Draft: No. 29, 2017 AFL Women's draft
- Debut: Round 2, 2018, Carlton vs. Greater Western Sydney, at Drummoyne Oval
- Height: 164 cm (5 ft 5 in)
- Position: Defender

Playing career^{1}
Years	Club	Games (Goals)
2018–2019	Carlton	4 (0)
- ^{1} Playing statistics correct to the end of the 2019 season.

Reni Hicks (born 7 September 1998) is an Australian rules footballer who played for the Carlton Football Club in the AFL Women's (AFLW). Hicks was drafted by Carlton with their third selection and the twenty-ninth overall in the 2017 AFL Women's draft. She made her debut in the twenty-one point win against Greater Western Sydney at Drummoyne Oval in round 2 of the 2018 season.
