= Daria Bannister =

Australian rules footballer (born 1999)

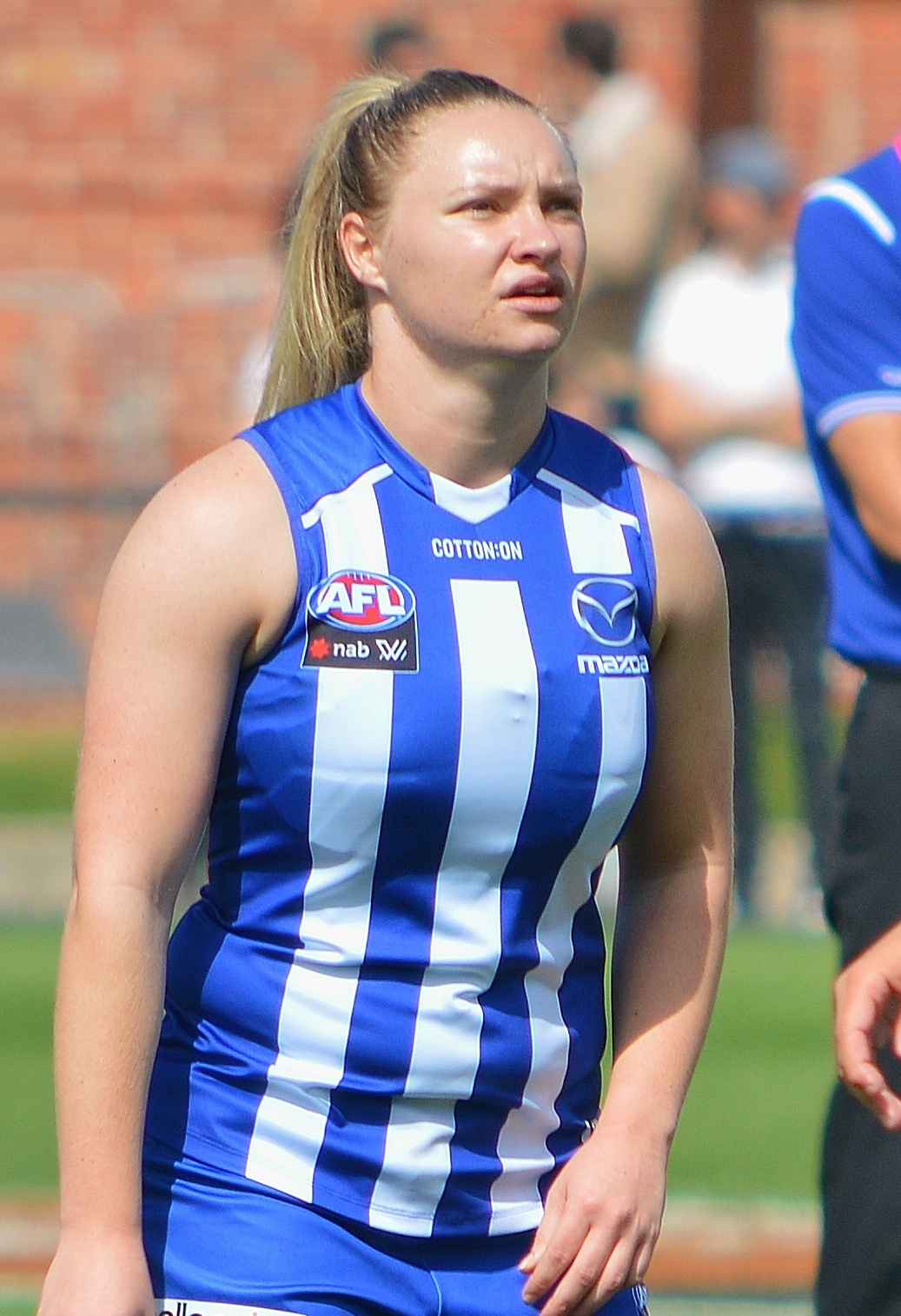
- Bannister with North Melbourne in March 2021

Personal information
- Born: 20 April 1999 (age 27)
- Original team: Launceston (TWL)
- Draft: No. 19, 2017 AFL Women's draft
- Debut: Round 1, 2018, Western Bulldogs vs. Fremantle, at VU Whitten Oval
- Height: 162 cm (5 ft 4 in)
- Position: Midfielder

Club information
- Current club: Essendon
- Number: 3

Playing career^{1}
Years	Club	Games (Goals)
2018	Western Bulldogs	1 (0)
2019–2022	North Melbourne	24 (14)
S7 (2022)–	Essendon	15 (11)
Total		40 (25)
- ^{1} Playing statistics correct to the end of the 2023 season.

Daria Bannister (born 20 April 1999) is an Australian rules footballer with Essendon in the AFL Women's (AFLW). Bannister was drafted by the Western Bulldogs with their fourth selection and nineteenth overall in the 2017 AFL Women's draft. She made her debut in the 26-point win against Fremantle at VU Whitten Oval in the opening round of the 2018 season. She suffered a knee injury in the fourth quarter of that match, later revealed to be a ruptured anterior cruciate ligament. The resulting surgery would see an end to her AFLW season and carry an estimated 12 months of recovery. In May 2018, Bannister signed with expansion club North Melbourne to play with the club in the 2019 AFLW season. It was revealed she signed on with the club for two more seasons on 17 June 2021, tying her to the club until the end of 2023; however, in May 2022, she joined expansion club Essendon.

== Statistics ==
Statistics are correct to the end the 2023 AFLW season

Legend
G	Goals	K	Kicks	D	Disposals	T	Tackles
B	Behinds	H	Handballs	M	Marks

Season	Team	No.	Games	Totals							Averages (per game)						
Season	Team	No.	Games	G	B	K	H	D	M	T	G	B	K	H	D	M	T
2018	Western Bulldogs	20	1	0	0	4	1	5	3	2	0.0	0.0	4.0	1.0	5.0	3.0	2.0
2019	North Melbourne	2	2	1	0	6	0	6	2	4	0.5	0.0	3.0	0.0	3.0	1.0	2.0
2020	North Melbourne	2	1	0	0	0	2	2	0	2	0.0	0.0	0.0	2.0	2.0	0.0	2.0
2021	North Melbourne	2	10	6	7	37	23	60	15	11	0.6	0.7	3.7	2.3	6.0	1.5	1.1
2022 S6	North Melbourne	2	11	7	5	50	17	67	17	12	0.6	0.5	4.5	1.5	6.1	1.5	1.1
2022 S7	Essendon	3	9	8	4	67	29	96	24	32	0.9	0.4	7.4	3.2	10.7	2.7	3.6
2023	Essendon	3	6	3	4	34	21	55	20	21	0.5	0.7	5.7	3.5	9.2	3.3	3.5
Career			40	25	20	198	93	291	81	84	0.6	0.5	5.0	2.3	7.3	2.0	2.1
