= Marc Webb (footballer) =

Personal information
- Born: 23 February 1979 (age 47)
- Height: 183 cm (6 ft 0 in)
- Weight: 84 kg (185 lb)

Playing career^{1}
Years	Club	Games (Goals)
2000	Port Melbourne	6
2001–2002	Perth	20 (5)
2002–2010	Subiaco	176 (37)

Representative team honours^{2}
Years	Team	Games (Goals)
2005–2007	Western Australia	3 (0)

Coaching career^{3}
Years	Club	Games (W–L–D)
2012–2013	Claremont	34–10–0
- ^{1} Playing statistics correct to the end of 2010.^{2} Representative statistics correct as of 2007.^{3} Coaching statistics correct as of 2013.

Career highlights
- WAFL Premiership player - 2004, 2006-2008; Simpson Medallist - 2006; WAFL Premiership coach - 2012

Marc Webb (born 23 February 1979) is an Australian rules football coach in the West Australian Football League (WAFL). He played in the Victorian Football League (VFL) for Port Melbourne and in the WAFL for Perth and Subiaco. He served as an assistant coach at the Western Bulldogs after previously being a premiership winning senior coach for Claremont and serving as an assistant coach for Fremantle. He's the husband of Fremantle's AFLW coach Lisa Webb.

== Playing career ==
Webb played six matches for Port Melbourne in the VFL during the 2000 season. He moved to Western Australia to play for Perth. After playing 20 matches for the Demons, he transferred to Subiaco during the 2002 WAFL season. Between 2002 and 2010 he played 176 matches for Subiaco, including four premierships. He was the Simpson Medal-winner in the 2006 WAFL Grand Final.

== Coaching career ==
In 2011 he entered coaching, serving as an assistant coach at Subiaco. He was appointed head coach of Claremont before the 2012 WAFL season and led the Tigers to a premiership in his first year. In October 2013 he joined Fremantle in the Australian Football League as a development coach. In 2016 he was appointed as midfield coach. In 2021 he joined the coaching staff of the Western Bulldogs as midfield coach.
