= Alex Williams (Australian footballer) =

Australian rules footballer (born 1993)

Personal information
- Born: 20 April 1993 (age 33)
- Original team: East Fremantle (WAWFL)
- Debut: Round 1, 2017, Greater Western Sydney vs. Adelaide, at Thebarton Oval
- Height: 173 cm (5 ft 8 in)
- Position: Defender

Playing career^{1}
Years	Club	Games (Goals)
2017	Greater Western Sydney	7 (0)
2018–2021	Fremantle	13 (0)
Total		20 (0)
- ^{1} Playing statistics correct to the end of the 2021 season.

Alex Williams (born 20 April 1993) is an Australian rules footballer who played for Greater Western Sydney and Fremantle in the AFL Women's (AFLW) competition.

== AFLW career ==
Williams was recruited by the Greater Western Sydney Giants as a priority player in September 2016. She made her debut in the thirty-six point loss to Adelaide at Thebarton Oval in the opening round of the 2017 season. She played every match in her debut season to finish with seven games. She was delisted at the end of the 2017 season and was subsequently signed by Fremantle as a delisted free agent.

At Fremantle, Williams played every game in 2018 and 2019 until round 6 when she injured her knee, rupturing her anterior cruciate ligament. She missed the remainder of the season, and didn't return to the Fremantle team throughout the 2020 and 2021 seasons. She was delisted at the end of the 2021 season.
