= Claudia Whitfort =

Australian rules footballer

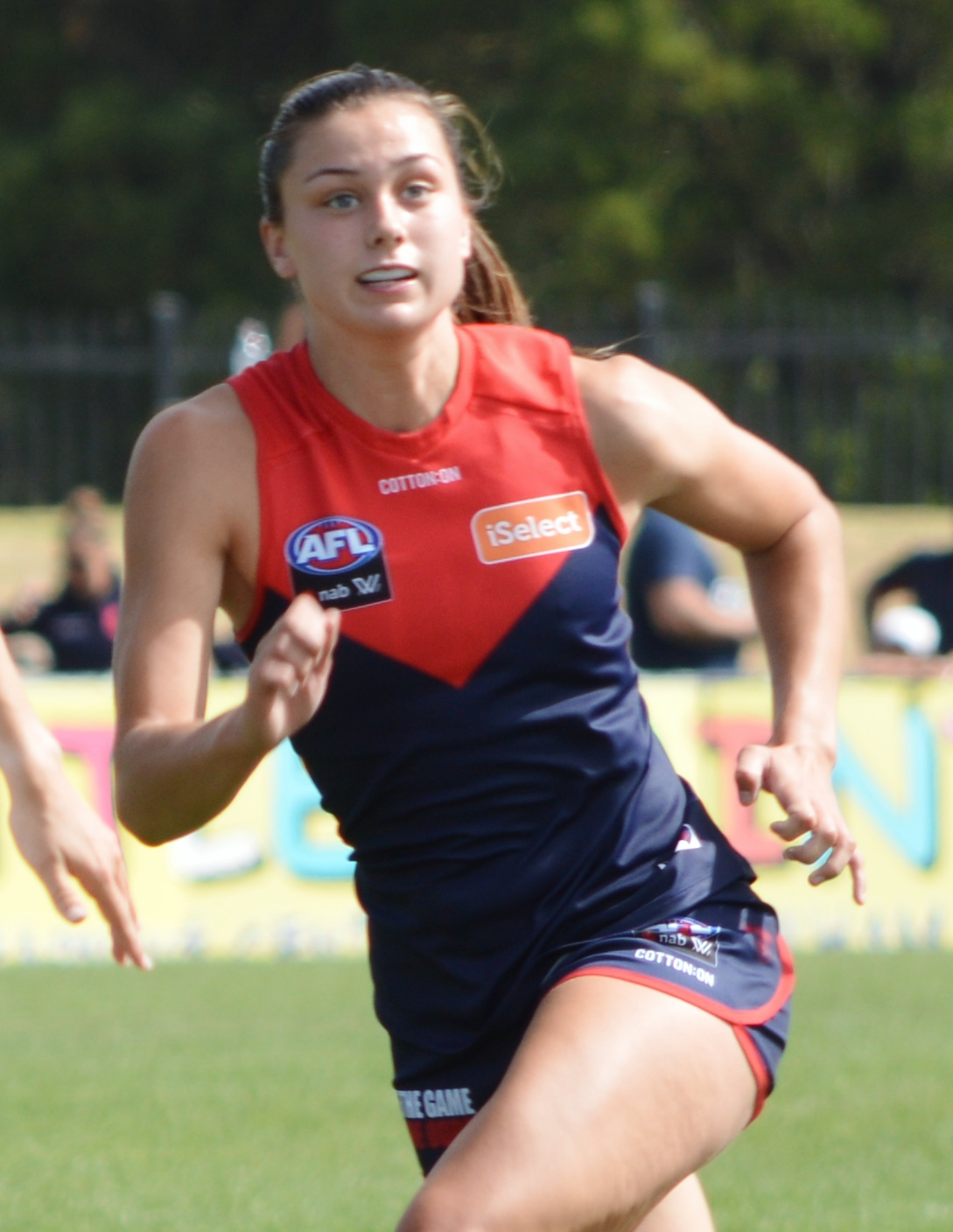
- Whitfort with Melbourne in January 2019

Personal information
- Born: 31 July 1999 (age 27); Melbourne, Australia
- Original team: Casey Demons (VFLW)/St Marys (NTFL)/St Kilda
- Draft: No. 30, 2017 AFL Women's draft
- Debut: Round 5, 2018, Melbourne vs. Brisbane, at Casey Fields
- Height: 171 cm (5 ft 7 in)
- Position: Defender

Club information
- Current club: Carlton

Playing career^{1}
Years	Club	Games (Goals)
2018–2019	Melbourne	24 (1)
2020–2021	St Kilda	10 (2)
2022–2025	Gold Coast	30 (5)
2026-	Carlton	20 (1)
Total		44 (7)
- ^{1} Playing statistics correct to the end of the 2023 season.

Career highlights
- AFL Players' Association 22Under22 squad 2021

Claudia Whitfort (born 31 July 1999) is an Australian rules footballer playing for the Carlton in the AFL Women's competition (AFLW). She has previously played for Melbourne, St Kilda and Gold Coast

== Early life ==
Whitford was born in Melbourne and raised in Mount Eliza, Victoria on the Mornington Peninsula. She was an athlete at Box Hill Athletics Club and Mornington Little Athletic Centre. She played netball for the Peninsula Waves Netball Club in the Victorian Netball League and represented Victoria three years in a row.

She also played football with the Casey Demons (VFLW) and off-season with St Mary's Football Club (NTFL) but her main focus was netball until she began playing for the Southern Saints (St Kilda VWFL) forging a reputation as a hard-hitting pressure tackler and hard ball winner.

Whitfort was drafted by Melbourne with the club's fourth selection and the 30th pick overall in the 2017 AFL Women's draft.

== AFLW career ==
She made her debut in the six point win against Brisbane at Casey Fields in round 5 of the 2018 season.

In April 2019, Whitfort was traded to expansion club St Kilda alongside pick #63 in exchange for picks #54 and #72.

In June 2021, Whitfort was traded to the Gold Coast in exchange for pick #36.
