= Jodie White (footballer) =

Australian rules footballer (born 1980)

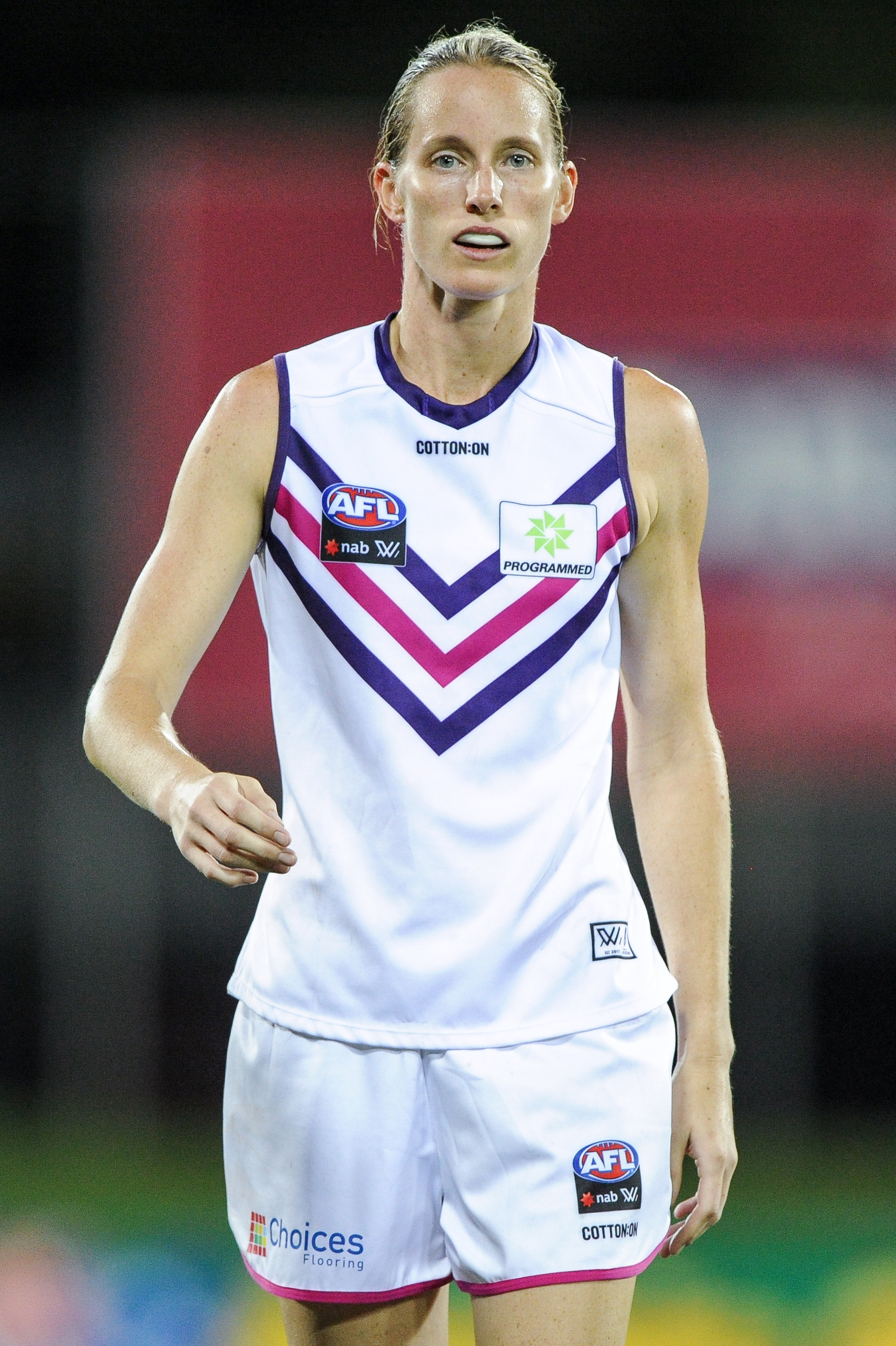
- White playing for Fremantle in January 2018

Personal information
- Born: 22 September 1980 (age 46)
- Original team: Coastal Titans (WAWFL)
- Draft: No. 18, 2017 AFL Women's draft
- Debut: Round 1, 2018, Fremantle vs. Western Bulldogs, at VU Whitten Oval
- Height: 180 cm (5 ft 11 in)
- Weight: 62 kg (137 lb)
- Position: Ruck

Playing career^{1}
Years	Club	Games (Goals)
2018	Fremantle	4 (0)
- ^{1} Playing statistics correct to the end of the 2018 season.

Jodie White (born 22 September 1980) is an Australian rules footballer who played for the Fremantle Football Club in the AFL Women's (AFLW). White was drafted by Fremantle with their third selection and eighteenth overall in the 2017 AFL Women's draft. She made her debut in the twenty-six point loss to the Western Bulldogs at VU Whitten Oval in the opening round of the 2018 season. She was delisted by Fremantle at the end of the 2018 season.
