= Elise Hogan =

Australian rules footballer (born 1991)

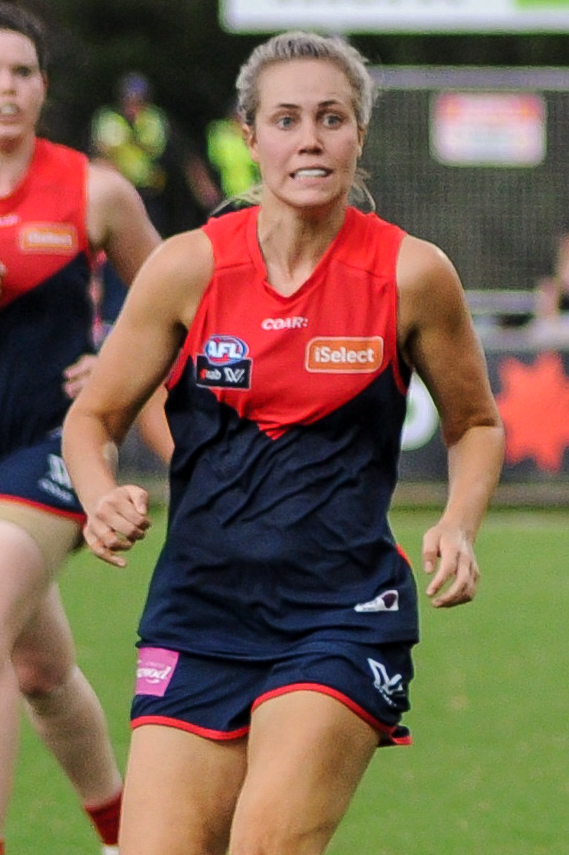
- Hogan with Melbourne in March 2017

Personal information
- Born: 25 April 1991 (age 35)
- Original team: Bendigo Thunder (VWFL)
- Debut: Round 6, 2017, Melbourne vs. Adelaide, at TIO Stadium
- Height: 171 cm (5 ft 7 in)
- Position: Midfielder

Playing career^{1}
Years	Club	Games (Goals)
2017	Melbourne	1 (0)
- ^{1} Playing statistics correct to the end of 2017.

Elise Hogan (née Strachan) (born 25 April 1991) is an Australian rules footballer who played for the Melbourne Football Club in the AFL Women's competition. Hogan played with the Bendigo Thunder in the premier division of the Victorian Women's Football League (VWFL) during the 2016 season, including playing in the grand final, in which the club lost by thirteen points to Deer Park. Despite missing out on selection in the 2016 AFL Women's draft, she trained with the Melbourne Football Club as a back-up player.

Hogan was elevated to Melbourne's main squad in March 2017 as an injury replacement for Pepa Randall, Meg Downie and Stephanie De Bortoli. A week after her elevation, she made her debut in the two point win against Adelaide at TIO Stadium in round six. She managed just two kicks in the match and was subsequently omitted for the final round match against Fremantle at Casey Fields. She was not retained on Melbourne's list at the end of the season and was consequently delisted in May 2017. After the conclusion of the 2017 AFL Women's season and due to the discontinuation of the VWFL after the 2016 season, she joined Geelong in the Victorian Football League Women's (VFL Women's) for the 2017 season.
