= Bridie Kennedy =

Australian rules footballer

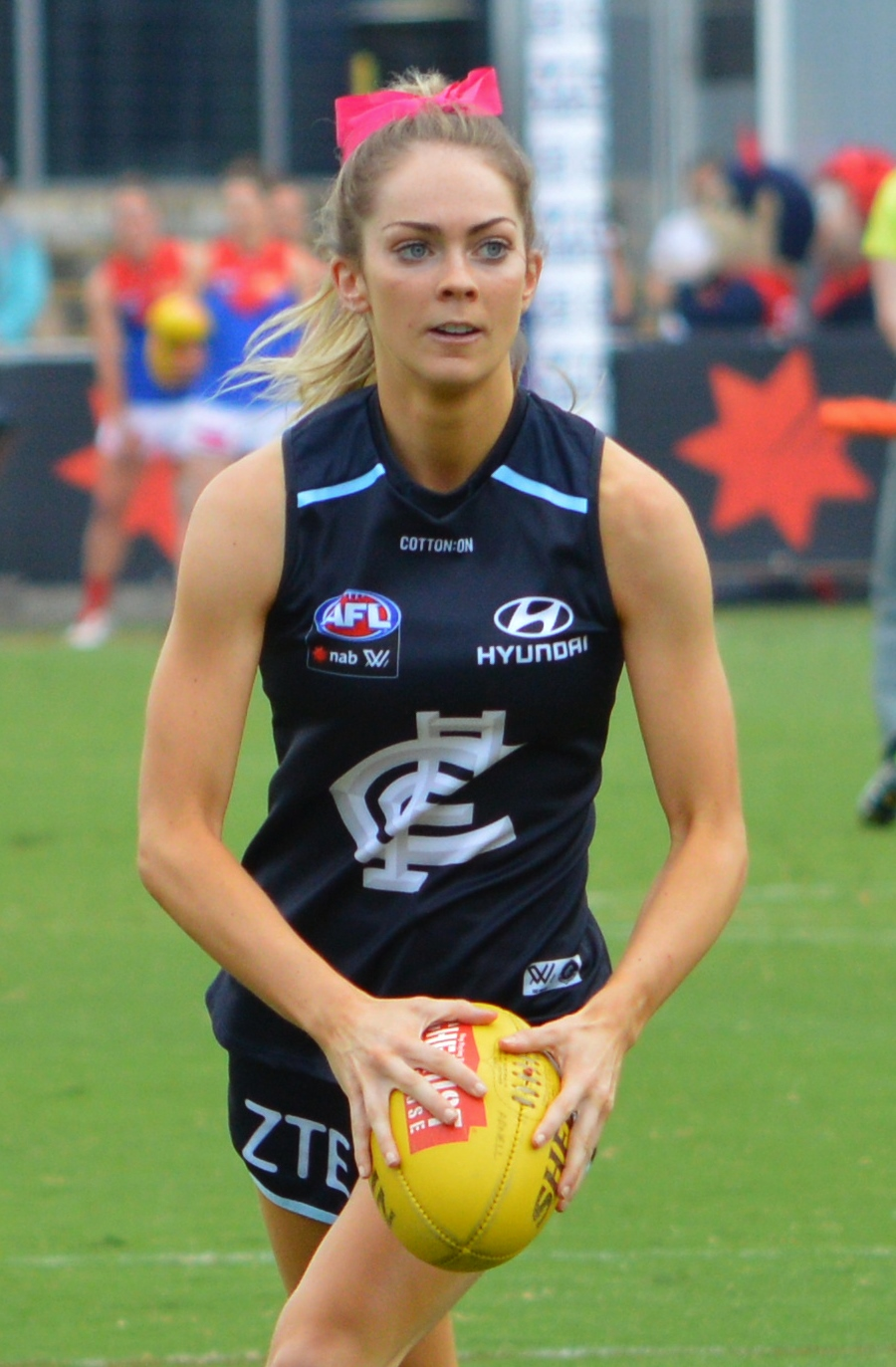
- Kennedy with Carlton in March 2018

Personal information
- Born: 23 September 1999 (age 27)
- Original teams: Cranbourne (VFL Women's); Dandenong Stingrays (TAC Cup Girls)
- Draft: No. 36, 2017 AFL Women's draft
- Debut: Round 4, 2018, Carlton vs. Western Bulldogs, at VU Whitten Oval
- Height: 175 cm (5 ft 9 in)
- Position: Defender/midfielder

Playing career^{1}
Years	Club	Games (Goals)
2018–2019	Carlton	4 (0)
2022 (S7)–2023	Sydney	12 (0)
Total		16 (0)
- ^{1} Playing statistics correct to the end of the 2023 season.

Career highlights
- Junior: TAC Cup Girls best and fairest: 2017

Bridie Kennedy (born 23 September 1999) is an Australian rules footballer who played for Carlton and Sydney in the AFL Women's (AFLW).

She played junior representative football with the Dandenong Stingrays in the TAC Cup Girls competition where she was a co-winner of the league's Best and Fairest Award in 2017 with future teammate Chloe Molloy. She also played state league football that year with Cranbourne in the VFL Women's competition and previously played local junior football with Dromana.

Kennedy was drafted by Carlton with their fourth selection and the 36th pick overall in the 2017 AFL Women's draft. She made her debut in a 73-point loss to Western Bulldogs at VU Whitten Oval in round 4 of the 2018 season. She played a further three games in 2018 but did not add to her tally in 2019 and was delisted at the end of that season.

Kennedy re-joined the AFLW in June 2022, when she was signed by expansion club Sydney. An elite runner, Kennedy went on to play all 10 games in Sydney's inaugural season in defence and on the wing, but only two in 2023.

In December 2023, Kennedy delisted herself for personal reasons.
