= Emma Mackie =

Australian cyclist (born 1984)

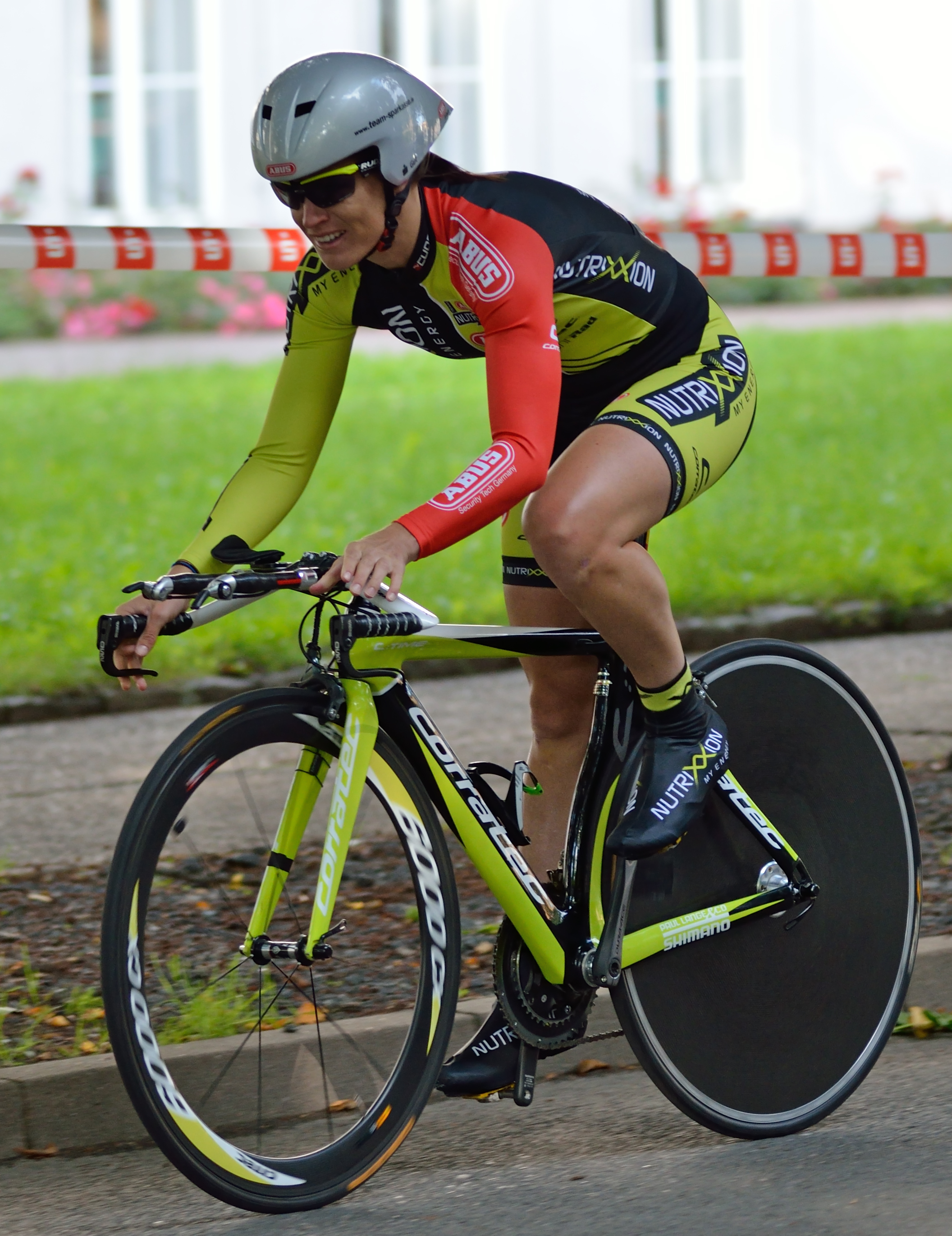
- Mackie at the 2012 Tour of Thuringia

Personal information
- Born: 9 September 1984 (age 42) Australia

Cycling career
- Sport: Cycling
- Discipline: Road cycling

Professional teams
- 2007: Vrienden van het Platteland
- 2008–2009: Lotto–Belisol Ladiesteam
- 2010–2011: TIBCO–To The Top
- 2012: ABUS–Nutrixxion

Emma Mackie (born 9 September 1984) is a road cyclist from Australia. She represented her nation at the 2009 UCI Road World Championships.

== Australian football ==
Mackie successfully changed sports, winning Box Hill's best and fairest for the 2017 VFL Women's season. She played three games with Western Bulldogs in the 2018 AFL Women's season, and was named team captain for Hawthorn Football Club's inaugural VFL Women's season in 2018. In April 2019, she was traded to expansion club St Kilda. In March 2020, Mackie retired from football.

== See also ==
- 2007 Vrienden van het Platteland season
- 2009 Lotto–Belisol Ladiesteam season
