= Arianna Clarke =

Australian rules footballer

Personal information
- Born: 16 August 1999 (age 27)
- Original team: Coolangatta Tweed Heads (QWAFL)
- Draft: No. 15, 2017 AFL Women's draft
- Debut: Round 1, 2018, Brisbane vs. Adelaide, at Norwood Oval
- Height: 172 cm (5 ft 8 in)
- Position: Defender

Playing career^{1}
Years	Club	Games (Goals)
2018–2020	Brisbane	12 (0)
2025	St Kilda	7 (1)
Total		19 (1)
- ^{1} Playing statistics correct to the end of the 2025 season.

Arianna Clarke (born 6 April 1999) is an Australian rules footballer who has played for Brisbane and St Kilda in the AFL Women's.

== Early life ==
Clarke was born in Kalgoorlie, Western Australia. At the age of 13, she moved to the Gold Coast where she attended Robina State High School and played football for the Broadbeach Cats. She later switched to play for Coolangatta Tweed Heads in the AFL Queensland Women's League and was drafted by the Brisbane Lions with pick 15 in the 2017 AFL Women's draft.

== AFLW career ==
Clarke was recruited by Brisbane with the number 15 pick in the 2017 AFL Women's draft. She made her debut in the Lions' round 1 game against Adelaide at Norwood Oval on 3 February 2018. In August 2020, Clarke announced her retirement after Brisbane released her from the second year of her contract.

Clarke relocated to Melbourne to pursue her football dreams again and played for the Sandringham Zebras in the VFL Women's. She also started a career in renewable energy with a company called Djookian that is helps organisations transition to net zero while creating opportunities for women and Aboriginal people.

Prior to the start of the 2025 AFL Women's season, Clarke was added to the St Kilda squad as a replacement player following the retirement of Kiera Whiley. She played seven games for the club before being delisted at the end of the season.

== Statistics ==
Legend
G	Goals	K	Kicks	D	Disposals	T	Tackles
B	Behinds	H	Handballs	M	Marks

Season	Team	No.	Games	Totals							Averages (per game)							Votes
Season	Team	No.	Games	G	B	K	H	D	M	T	G	B	K	H	D	M	T	Votes
2018	Brisbane	21	8	0	0	27	22	49	6	14	0.0	0.0	3.4	2.8	6.1	0.8	1.8	0
2019	Brisbane	21	4	0	0	10	8	18	4	4	0.0	0.0	2.5	2.0	4.5	1.0	1.0	0
2020	Brisbane	21	0	—	—	—	—	—	—	—	—	—	—	—	—	—	—	0
2025	St Kilda	34	7	1	1	19	17	36	3	18	0.1	0.1	2.7	2.4	5.1	0.4	2.6	0
Career			19	1	1	56	47	103	13	36	0.1	0.1	2.9	2.5	5.4	0.7	1.9	0
