= West Australian Women's Football League =

Australian institution

- Sport: Women's Australian rules football
- First season: 1988
- Folded: 2021
- President: Carolyn Hills
- No. of teams: 9
- Country: Australia
- Headquarters: Subiaco, Western Australia
- Last champion: East Fremantle (2018)
- Most titles: Coastal Titans (7)
- Website: wawfl.com.au

The West Australian Women's Football League (WAWFL) was the governing body of women's Australian rules football in the state of Western Australia from 1987 until its dissolution in 2021.

It organised the premier women's football league in Western Australia from 1987 to 2018, which was superseded in 2019 by the WAFLW league, a joint initiative of the WAWFL and the West Australian Football Commission.

== History ==
The WAWFL football league was formed in 1987. The first season of competition was played in 1988 between four clubs, with a team from Mount Lawley winning the inaugural premiership. A second division was added from 2007 and the two divisions were later renamed "League" and "Reserves", the format most commonly used in Australian football leagues.

== Clubs ==
During the history of the league, some clubs which were originally formed independently have become associated with the clubs competing in the men's Western Australian Football League. The current clubs are:

Name	Formed	League premierships	Reserves premierships	Notes
Claremont Piranhas	1988			
Subiaco	2004	7		formerly known as Coastal Titans
East Fremantle Sharks	1988	7	0	Originally known as Melville Warriors
East Perth Royals	2016	0	0	Formerly known as Mt Lawley Hawks. Reserves team only in 2016
Joondalup Falcons	2007	0	2	Reserves team only in 2016
Peel Thunderbirds	2007			
Perth Angels				Formerly known as the SNESA Angels. Reserves team only in 2016
South Fremantle Bulldogs	2007			Promoted to Division 1 in 2010
Swan Districts		4		

== Premierships ==
Division 1

- 2018 East Fremantle Sharks
- 2017 Swan Districts
- 2016 Swan Districts
- 2015 Coastal Titans
- 2014 Swan Districts
- 2013 Swan Districts
- 2012 Coastal Titans
- 2011 East Fremantle Sharks
- 2010 Coastal Titans
- 2009 East Fremantle Sharks
- 2008 Coastal Titans
- 2007 Melville Sharks
- 2006 Coastal Titans
- 2005 Coastal Titans
- 2004 Coastal Titans
- 2003 Southern Thunder
- 2002 Melville
- 2001 Innaloo
- 2000 Innaloo
- 1999 Innaloo
- 1998 Belmont
- 1997 Belmont
- 1996 Innaloo
- 1995 Innaloo
- 1994 Vic Park
- 1993 Vic Park
- 1992 Carlisle
- 1991 Melville
- 1990 Melville
- 1989 Carlisle
- 1988 Mt Lawley

Division 2 (formerly Reserves)

- 2017 Swan Districts
- 2016 Joondalup Falcons
- 2015 Claremont
- 2014 Coastal Titans
- 2013 Swan Districts
- 2012 Claremont Piranhas
- 2011 SNESA Angels
- 2010 Peel Thunderbirds
- 2009 South Fremantle Bulldogs
- 2008 Coastal Titans
- 2007 Joondalup Falcons

== Honours ==
Fairest and Best The Medal is awarded to the best and fairest overall of the season as determined by the Umpires. This prestigious award is presented to the recipient at the end of season Presentation Dinner.

- 1988 – Kara Graham (Innaloo)
- 1989 – Karen Cooper (Carlisle)
- 1990 – Kara Graham (Innaloo)
- 1991 – Larissa Ukich (Melville)
- 1992 – Dhara Kerr (Innaloo); Kelley Lutey (Carlisle)
- 1993 – Dhara Kerr (Innaloo)
- 1994 – Dhara Kerr (Innaloo)
- 1995 – Kylie Hodges (Vic Park)
- 1996 – Tammy Licence (Melville)
- 1997 – Louise Knitter (Koonga Valley)
- 1998 – Amanda Crean (UWA)
- 1999 – Amanda Crean (UWA)
- 2000 – Amanda Crean (UWA)
- 2001 – Priscilla Harry (Southern Thunder)
- 2002 – Deanne Coates (Innaloo)
- 2003 – Louise Knitter (Forrestfield)
- 2004 – Louise Knitter (Forrestfield)
- 2005 – Louise Knitter (Forrestfield)
- 2006 – Belinda Bentley (Melville)
- 2007 – Louise Knitter (Gosnells); Shelley Matcham (Melville)
- 2008 – Deanne Coates (Coastal Titans)
- 2009 – Deanne Coates (Coastal Titans); Kiara Bowers (Southern River)
- 2010 – Melissa Caulfield (Southern River)
- 2011 – Melissa Caulfield (East Fremantle)
- 2012 – Lauren Stammers (Coastal Titans)
- 2013 – Kiara Bowers (Coastal Titans); Chelsea Randall (Swan Districts)
- 2014 – Kiara Bowers (Coastal Titans)
- 2015 – Kiara Bowers (Coastal Titans)
- 2016 – Kiara Bowers (Coastal Titans); Emma King (Coastal Titans)
- 2017 – Jodie White (Coastal Titans)
- 2018 – Hayley Miller (Subiaco)

Jo-anne Huggins Leading Goal Kickers

- 1990 – Kelley Lutey (Carlisle)
- 1991 – Janice Woods (Carlisle)
- 1992 – Kelley Lutey (Carlisle)
- 1993 – Karen Cooper (Vic Park)
- 1994 – Susan Daly (Innaloo)
- 1995 – Kelley Lutey (Vic Park)
- 1996 – Vanessa Chrisp (Innaloo)
- 1997 – Cindy Farinosi (Innaloo)
- 1998 – Nicole George (Belmont)
- 1999 – Nicole George (Belmont); Denise Wallace (Melville)
- 2000 – Denise Wallace (Melville)
- 2001 – Joanne Hartley 9Southern Thunder)
- 2002 – Danielle Fagents (Innaloo)
- 2003 – Jodie Shuttleworth(Innaloo)
- 2004 – Charlene Headland (Southern Thunder)
- 2005 – Natalie McDonald (Coastal Titans)
- 2006 – Krystal Rivers 9Coastal Titans)
- 2007 – Loren Fricker (Coastal Titans)
- 2008 – Loren Fricker (Coastal Titans)
- 2009 – Loren Fricker (Coastal Titans)
- 2010 – Ashlee Atkins (Swan Districts)
- 2011 – Amber Steiber (East Fremantle); Melissa Caulfield (East Fremantle)
- 2012 – Kiara Bowers (Coastal Titans)
- 2013 – Trisha Ramsay (Coastal Titans)
- 2014 – Trisha Ramsay (Coastal Titans)
- 2015 – Trisha Ramsay (Coastal Titans)
- 2016 – Amy Lavell (Coastal Titans)
- 2017 – Kira Phillips (Peel)
- 2018 – Kira Phillips (Peel)

Cath Boyce Rookie of the Year

- 1995 – Mel Hicks (Canning)
- 1996 – Tammy Licence (Melville)
- 1997 – Amanda Crean (UWA)
- 1998 – Cherie Bambury (Belmont)
- 1999 – Samantha Winslow (Melville)
- 2000 – Karen Cowley (Innaloo)
- 2001 – Alana Duffus (Southern Thunder)
- 2002 – Jane Davis (Melville)
- 2003 – Catherine Young (Forrestfield)
- 2004 – Emma Burgess (Southern Thunder)
- 2005 – Rachael Russell (Melville)
- 2006 – Not awarded
- 2007 – Shelley Matcham (Melville)
- 2008 – Nicole Bolten (Coastal Titans)
- 2009 – Melissa Caulfield (Southern River)
- 2010 – Linnea Mansson (Claremont)
- 2011 – Kahra Sprlyan (South Fremantle)
- 2012 – Ashleigh Brazill (East Fremantle)
- 2013 – Lara Filocamo (Claremont)
- 2014 – Not awarded
- 2015 – Erin Fox (East Fremantle)
- 2016 – Jasmin Stewart (Claremont)
- 2017 – Sabreena Duffy (Peel Thunderbirds)
- 2018 – Jayme Harken (Subiaco)

Life members

- 1994 – Cath Boyce
- 1995 – Sharon Woods
- 1996 – Barbara Hampson
- 1997 – Jo-Anne Huggins
- 1997 – Kerryn Wood
- 2000 – Debbie White
- 2001 – Charmaine Rogers
- 2002 – Lynette (Smith) Geaney
- 2016 – Nikki Harwood
- 2018 – Carolyn Hills

== See also ==
- List of Australian rules football women's leagues
