= Jess Wuetschner =

Australian rules footballer

Personal information
- Full name: Jessica Wuetschner
- Nicknames: Woosha, Woosh
- Born: 28 April 1992 (age 34); Hobart, Tasmania
- Original team: East Fremantle (WAWFL)
- Draft: No. 34, 2016 AFL Women's draft
- Debut: Round 1, 2017, Brisbane vs. Melbourne, at Casey Fields
- Height: 162 cm (5 ft 4 in)
- Position: Forward pocket/Half-forward flank

Playing career^{1}
Years	Club	Games (Goals)
2017–2022 (S6)	Brisbane	38 (37)
2022 (S7)–2023	Essendon	17 (5)
Total		55 (42)

Representative team honours^{2}
Years	Team	Games (Goals)
2017	The Allies	1 (1)
- ^{1} Playing statistics correct to the end of the 2023 season.^{2} Representative statistics correct as of 2017.

Career highlights
- AFL Women's premiership player: 2021; AFL Women's All-Australian team: 2018; 2× Brisbane leading goalkicker: 2018, 2019

Jessica Wuetschner (/ˈwuːtʃnər/, first syllable rhymes with "pooch"; born 28 April 1992) is a former Australian rules footballer who played for Brisbane and Essendon in the AFL Women's (AFLW).

== Early life ==
Born in Hobart, Wuetschner first formally played football at age 16 and quickly went on to be a standout performer in the Tasmanian Women's League for Clarence Football Club. From 2011 to 2013, she won both the league's leading goal-kicker award and the league's best and fairest award each year, while her team achieved a rare premiership three-peat.

Wuetschner also proved to be a notable talent across various other sports while growing up, representing her state in hockey at underage level, and winning the best and fairest award in the Cricket Tasmania Premier League women's competition for both the 2010–11 and 2011–12 seasons.

In 2014, Wuetschner moved to Perth and began playing for East Fremantle in the West Australian Women's Football League (WAWFL).

In May 2015, she was selected to play for the Western Bulldogs in AFL-sanctioned exhibition matches against Melbourne at the MCG and Docklands Stadium.

In 2015, Wuetschner was part of an international exchange that saw her play Australian rules in the United States with the Boston Lady Demons in the USAFLW playing at the 2015 USAFL National Championships.

== AFL Women's career ==
Wuetschner was recruited by Brisbane with the number 34 pick in the 2016 AFL Women's draft. She made her debut in the Lions' inaugural game against Melbourne at Casey Fields on 5 February 2017. Wuetschner kicked two goals during Brisbane's six-point loss to Adelaide in the 2017 grand final. At the end of the season, she was listed in the 40-player All-Australian squad.

In 2018, Wuetschner placed second behind Brooke Lochland in the league goal-kicking award, finishing the regular season with 11 goals. Despite playing in another six-point grand final loss, this time at the hands of the Western Bulldogs, she once again kicked two goals for Brisbane on the day. Her standout year as a forward was rewarded with selection in the All-Australian team. She re-signed with the Lions for the following season, having rejected offers from expansion club North Melbourne.

Brisbane slumped to a 2–5 win–loss record in 2019, however Wuetschner still managed eight goals from seven matches—including a three-goal performance in her club's two-point round one victory against Greater Western Sydney—and earned a third All-Australian nomination.

Two weeks before the beginning of the 2020 season, Wuetschner was struck by lightning while working as a stevedore at the Port of Brisbane. She avoided serious injury from the traumatic incident, but struggled with her mental health in the subsequent months and considered retiring from football. Having missed the opening month of the 2021 season, Wuetschner re-established herself as a key fixture of Brisbane's line-up as the team went on to win their first premiership. In the 18-point Grand Final victory against Adelaide at Adelaide Oval, she rose to the occasion in typical fashion, kicking two goals off her "beautiful" left foot.

After a five-disposal game against Geelong in round four of 2022 season 6, Wuetschner was omitted from the Brisbane line-up. Later in the season, she announced a decision to take time away from AFLW in order to focus on her mental health. In a club press release, the Brisbane Lions stated they would "continue to provide Jess with our full support". In May 2022, Wuetschner was delisted by Brisbane. The following month, she was signed by expansion club Essendon as a delisted free agent.

After 38 games with Brisbane and 17 with Essendon, she retired at the end of the 2023 season.

== Statistics ==
Legend
G	Goals	K	Kicks	D	Disposals	T	Tackles
B	Behinds	H	Handballs	M	Marks

Led the league for the season only
Led the league after the Grand Final only
Led the league after season and Grand Final

Season	Team	No.	Games	Totals							Averages (per game)							Votes
Season	Team	No.	Games	G	B	K	H	D	M	T	G	B	K	H	D	M	T	Votes
2017	Brisbane	23	8	5	3	44	17	61	16	23	0.6	0.4	5.5	2.1	7.6	2.0	2.9	0
2018	Brisbane	23	8	13	6	61	16	77	19	23	1.6	0.8	7.6	2.1	9.8	2.4	2.9	3
2019	Brisbane	23	7	8	6	53	23	76	19	15	1.1	0.9	7.6	3.3	10.9	2.7	2.1	0
2020	Brisbane	23	5	3	2	30	15	45	12	12	0.6	0.4	6.0	3.0	9.0	2.4	2.4	0
2021	Brisbane	23	7	6	6	35	17	52	16	15	0.9	0.9	5.0	2.4	7.4	2.3	2.1	0
2022 (S6)	Brisbane	23	3	2	2	18	5	23	6	8	0.7	0.7	6.0	1.7	7.7	2.0	2.7	0
2022 (S7)	Essendon	21	9	3	3	35	15	50	9	17	0.3	0.3	3.9	1.7	5.6	1.0	1.9	0
2023	Essendon	21	8	2	2	26	26	52	13	12	0.3	0.3	3.3	3.3	6.5	1.6	1.5	0
Career			55	42	30	302	134	436	110	125	0.8	0.5	5.5	2.4	7.9	2.0	2.3	3
