= Meg Downie =

Australian rules footballer

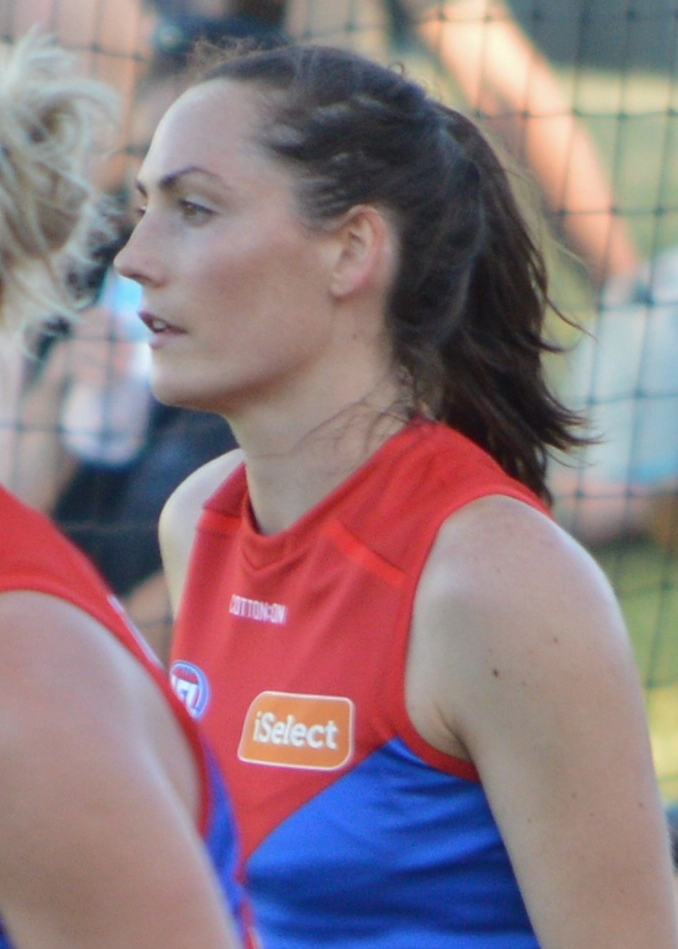
- Downie playing for Melbourne in January 2018

Personal information
- Born: 3 January 1989 (age 37)
- Original team: St Kilda Sharks (VFL Women's)
- Draft: 2016 free agent: Melbourne
- Debut: Round 1, 2017, Melbourne vs. Brisbane, at Casey Fields
- Height: 176 cm (5 ft 9 in)
- Position: Utility

Playing career
Years	Club	Games (Goals)
2017–2021	Melbourne	22 (0)

Career highlights
- AFL Women's All-Australian team: 2018

Meg Downie (born 3 January 1989) is a retired Australian rules footballer who played for the Melbourne Football Club in the AFL Women's (AFLW) competition.

== AFLW career ==
Downie was recruited by Melbourne as a free agent in October 2016. She made her debut in the 15 point loss to Brisbane at Casey Fields in the opening round of the 2017 season. She played in the next round against Collingwood, during which she was knocked out in a brutal clash with Collingwood player Sophie Casey. Downie suffered a heavy concussion and was unconscious for several minutes before leaving the ground on a stretcher. Casey was given a two match ban for the incident and Downie missed the remainder of the season due to a hamstring injury suffered moments before the clash.

Melbourne re-signed Downie for the 2018 season during the trade period in May 2017. In June 2021, after five seasons at the club, Downie retired from the game.

Downie's on field career highlights included selection in the 2018 All Australian team. Her off field contributions included her election to the AFL Players Association Board replacing her predecessor Daisy Pearce where she served for two years. She was the second ever female to serve on the board in the AFL's history. Other contributions included being a member of the AFL Bushfire Relief Governance Committee where she contributed to the distribution of funds to communities impacted by the 2020 Victorian Bushfires.

Ever since the retirement, very little is known about her personal life.
