= Kate Lutkins =

Australian rules footballer

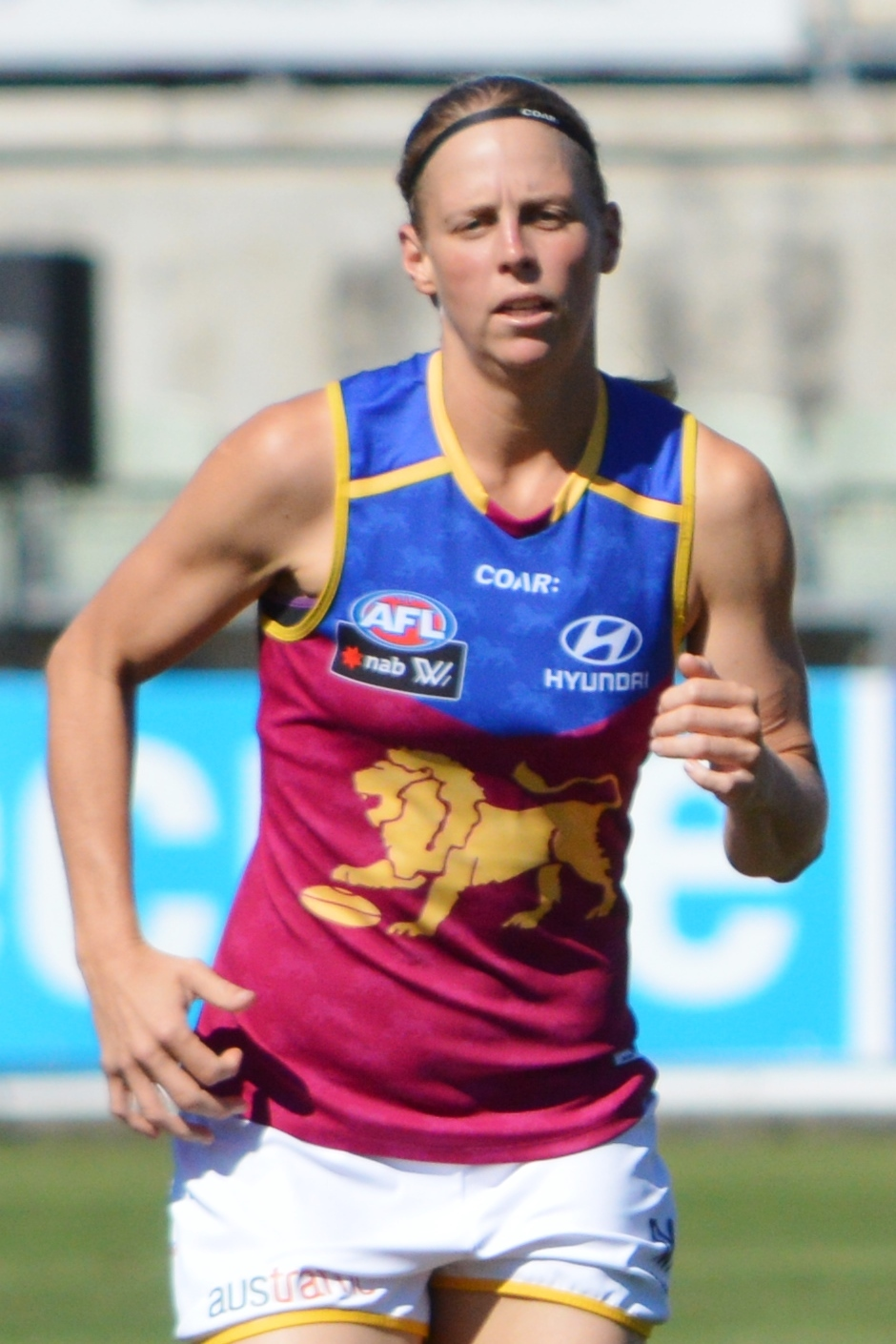
- Lutkins playing for Brisbane in March 2017

Personal information
- Born: 31 May 1988 (age 38); Brisbane, Queensland
- Original team: Wilston Grange (QWAFL)
- Draft: No. 79, 2016 AFL Women's draft
- Debut: Round 1, 2017, Brisbane vs. Melbourne, at Casey Fields
- Height: 176 cm (5 ft 9 in)
- Position: Defender

Playing career
| Years | Club | Games (Goals) |
| 2017–2024 | Brisbane | 52 (3) |

Career highlights
- AFLW premiership player (2021); AFL Women's Grand Final best-on-ground: 2021; 3× AFL Women's All-Australian team: 2018, 2020, 2021; Brisbane best and fairest: 2018

Kate Clarkson (born 31 May 1988), formerly and commonly known as Kate Lutkins, is a former Australian rules footballer who played for Brisbane in the AFL Women's. She won the best-on-ground award in the Lions' victorious grand final in 2021 and was named in three All-Australian teams across her career.

== Early life ==
Lutkins was born in 1988 in Brisbane, Queensland. Her mother is Debbie Bowe.

She attended and completed high school at West Moreton Anglican College and Ipswich Girls' Grammar School, in Ipswich, Queensland.

Lutkins captained the "undefeated" Yeronga Devils Aussie Rules team.

In 2012 she was working as an animal technician for the University of Queensland when she was announced as the captain of the national team to play in October at the Pacific Cup in San Francisco.

She was playing for Wilston Grange when she was drafted.

== AFLW career ==
Lutkins was recruited by Brisbane with the number 79 pick in the 2016 AFL Women's draft. She made her debut in the Lions' inaugural game against Melbourne at Casey Fields on 5 February 2017. At the end of the season, she won the Lions' Most Courageous award. Her 2018 season was rewarded with the club best and fairest. The 2020 AFL Women's season saw Lutkins obtain her second AFL Women's All-Australian team selection, named in the full back position.

Lutkins was awarded the medal for the best player on the ground at the 2021 AFL Women's Grand Final. She finished with 18 disposals, seven of them contested, and had ten rebound 50s. She played in pain, and was scheduled to have surgery on both feet, having torn the plantar fascia in her left foot during round eight. At the conclusion of the 2021 AFL Women's season, Lutkins was awarded with her third All-Australian blazer, named at centre half-back. Lutkins signed on with Brisbane for two more years on 15 June 2021. In 2022 season 6, Lutkins tore her anterior cruciate ligament early in the round 1 match against Adelaide Crows. This ruled her out for the remainder of the season. Ahead of schedule, she returned in round 5 of 2022 season 7 against Essendon at Burpengary.

She was placed on the inactive list in 2023 due to pregnancy. She played two further games in 2024 before announcing her retirement at the end of the season. She finished her AFLW career having played 52 matches for the Lions.

== Statistics ==
Legend
| G | Goals | K | Kicks | D | Disposals | T | Tackles |
| B | Behinds | H | Handballs | M | Marks |
| # | Played in that season's premiership team |

| Season | Team | No. | Games | Totals | | | | | | | Averages (per game) | | | | | | | Votes |
| Season | Team | No. | Games | G | B | K | H | D | M | T | G | B | K | H | D | M | T | Votes |
|---|---|---|---|---|---|---|---|---|---|---|---|---|---|---|---|---|---|---|
| 2017 | Brisbane | 13 | 8 | 1 | 0 | 59 | 7 | 66 | 12 | 17 | 0.1 | 0.0 | 7.4 | 0.9 | 8.3 | 1.5 | 2.1 | 0 |
| 2018 | Brisbane | 13 | 8 | 1 | 0 | 105 | 37 | 142 | 31 | 26 | 0.1 | 0.0 | 13.1 | 4.6 | 17.8 | 3.9 | 3.3 | 2 |
| 2019 | Brisbane | 13 | 7 | 0 | 2 | 74 | 20 | 94 | 27 | 24 | 0.0 | 0.3 | 10.6 | 2.9 | 13.4 | 3.9 | 3.4 | 0 |
| 2020 | Brisbane | 13 | 7 | 1 | 0 | 75 | 18 | 93 | 31 | 22 | 0.1 | 0.0 | 10.7 | 2.6 | 13.3 | 4.4 | 3.1 | 5 |
| 2021^{#} | Brisbane | 13 | 11 | 0 | 0 | 98 | 38 | 136 | 44 | 21 | 0.0 | 0.0 | 8.9 | 3.5 | 12.4 | 4.0 | 1.9 | 0 |
| 2022 (S6) | Brisbane | 13 | 1 | 0 | 0 | 0 | 1 | 1 | 0 | 0 | 0.0 | 0.0 | 0.0 | 1.0 | 1.0 | 0.0 | 0.0 | 0 |
| 2022 (S7) | Brisbane | 13 | 8 | 0 | 0 | 57 | 14 | 71 | 19 | 11 | 0.0 | 0.0 | 7.1 | 1.8 | 8.9 | 2.4 | 1.4 | 0 |
| 2023 | Brisbane | 13 | 0 | — | — | — | — | — | — | — | — | — | — | — | — | — | — | 0 |
| 2024 | Brisbane | 13 | 2 | 0 | 0 | 4 | 3 | 7 | 1 | 3 | 0.0 | 0.0 | 2.0 | 1.5 | 3.5 | 0.5 | 1.5 | 0 |
| Career | | | 52 | 3 | 2 | 472 | 138 | 610 | 165 | 124 | 0.1 | 0.0 | 9.1 | 2.7 | 11.7 | 3.2 | 2.4 | 7 |

== Private life ==
Lutkins married her partner Kate Clarkson and took her name.
