= Alicia Eva =

Australian rules footballer

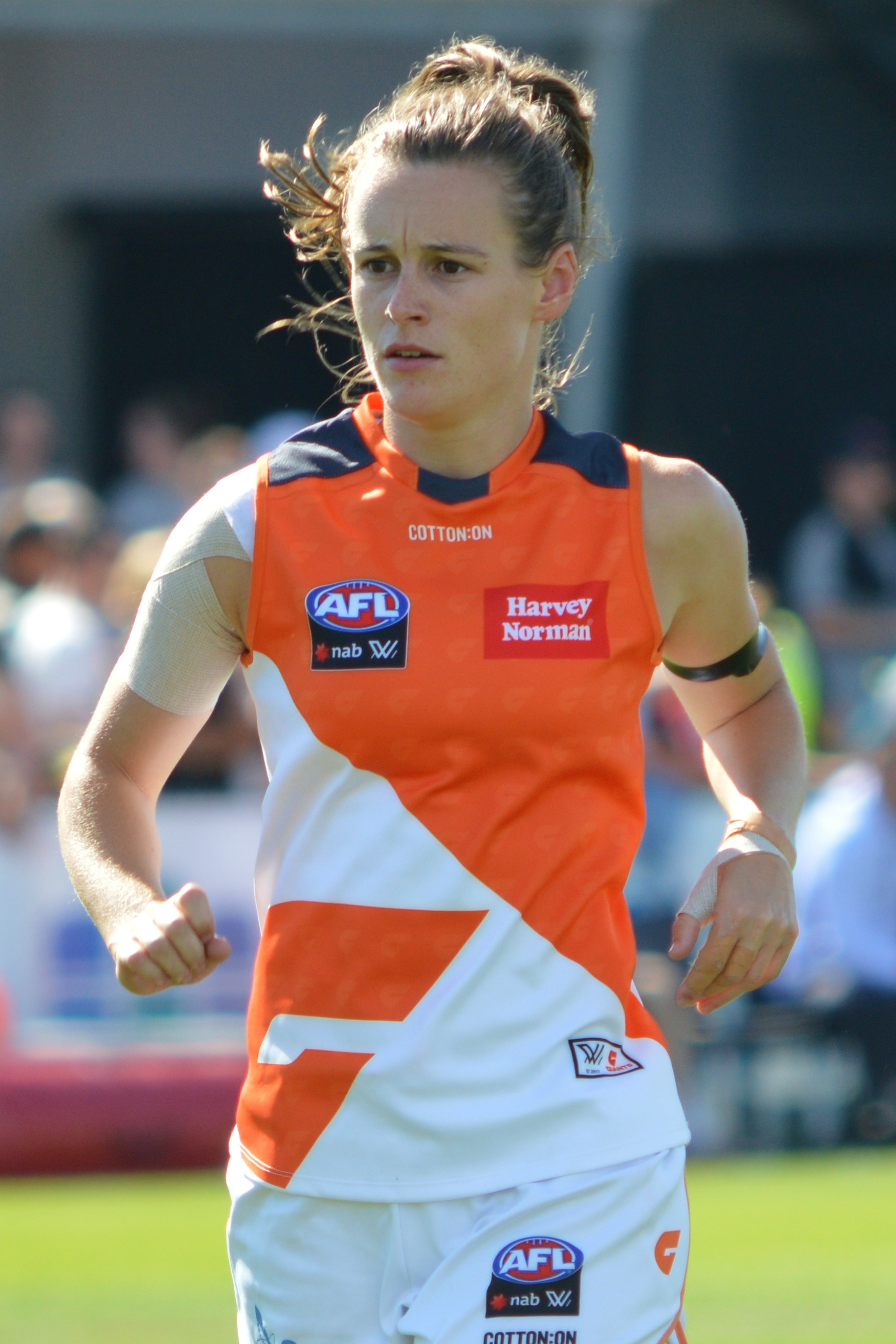
- Eva playing for Greater Western Sydney in 2018

Personal information
- Full name: Alicia Eva
- Born: 2 April 1991 (age 35)
- Original team: Melbourne University (VFLW)
- Draft: No. 54, 2016 national draft
- Debut: Round 1, 2017, Collingwood vs. Carlton, at Ikon Park
- Height: 163 cm (5 ft 4 in)
- Position: Midfielder

Club information
- Current club: Greater Western Sydney
- Number: 2

Playing career^{1}
| Years | Club | Games (Goals) |
| 2017 | Collingwood | 7 (3) |
| 2018– | Greater Western Sydney | 72 (13) |
| Total | | 79 (16) |

Representative team honours
| Years | Team | Games (Goals) |
| 2017 | Victoria | 1 (1) |
- ^{1} Playing statistics correct to the end of the 2025 season.

Career highlights
- Greater Western Sydney captain: 2020–2023; AFL Women's All-Australian team: 2018; Gabrielle Trainor Medal: 2018

Alicia Eva (born 2 April 1991) is an Australian rules footballer playing for the Greater Western Sydney Giants in the AFL Women's (AFLW). She previously played for the Collingwood Football Club in 2017. Eva was selected in the AFL Women's All-Australian team and won the Gabrielle Trainor Medal in her first season at the Giants in 2018. She served as Greater Western Sydney captain from 2020 to 2023.

== Early life ==
Eva grew up supporting the Melbourne Football Club, and her favourite player was their former captain David Neitz. Eva was forced to stop playing local football at the age of thirteen when she was no longer allowed to play alongside boys, and instead took up coaching. Eva played state league football with Melbourne University in the VFL Women's (VFLW).

== AFL Women's career ==
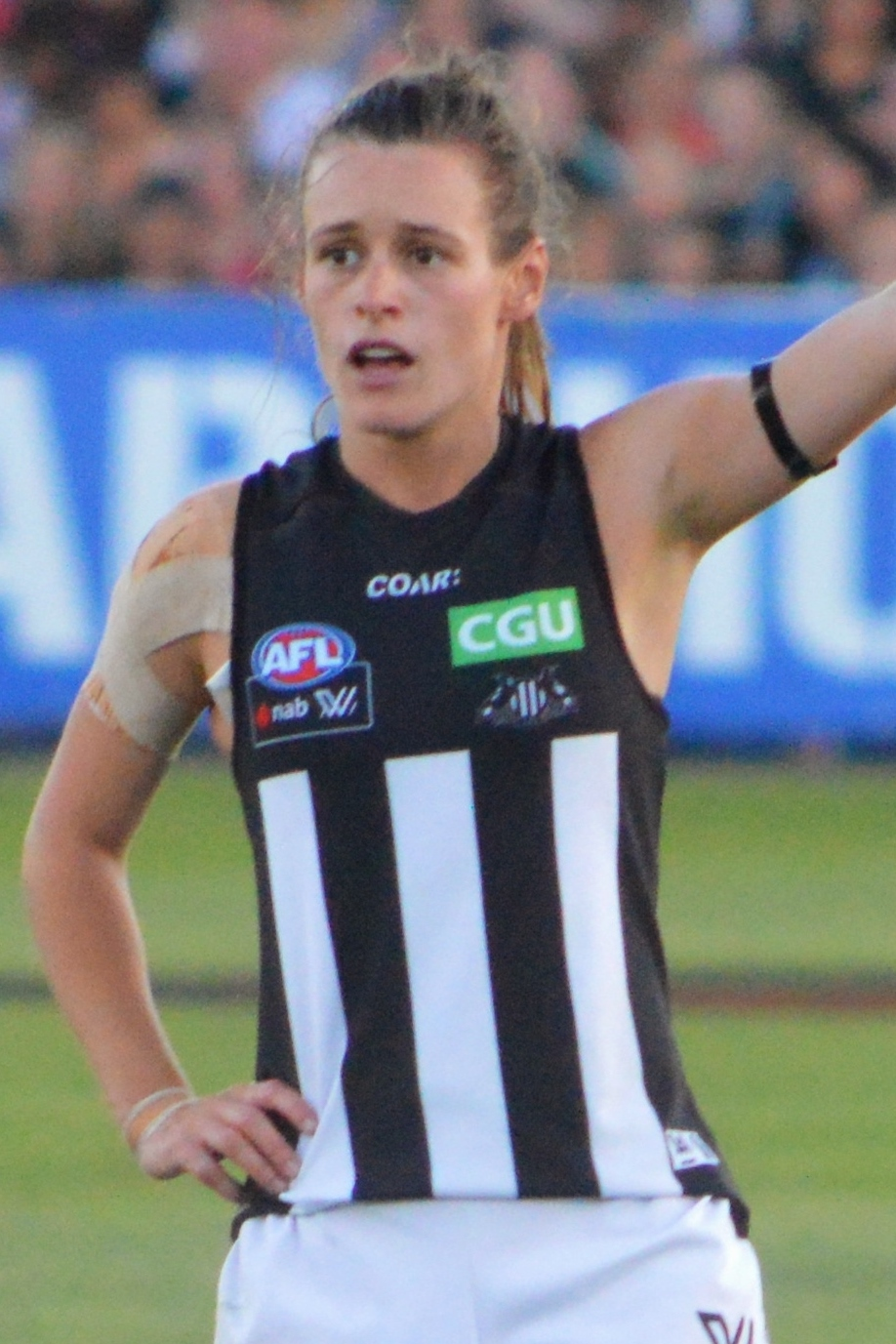
Eva playing for Collingwood in 2017

=== Collingwood (2017) ===
Eva was drafted by Collingwood with the club's seventh selection, fifty-fourth overall, in the 2016 AFL Women's draft. She was appointed vice-captain at Collingwood in late January 2017. Eva made her debut in round 1, 2017, in the league's inaugural match at IKON Park against Carlton. She played in all seven of Collingwood's matches that season, kicking three goals and leading the club in both total and average disposals. At season's end she placed second in the club's best and fairest award. Eva was named in the All-Australian squad of 40 players, but did not make the final team.

=== Greater Western Sydney (2018–present) ===
In the May trading and signing period, Eva was traded to Greater Western Sydney as part of a three-way trade involving the Western Bulldogs. Following her first season with the Giants, in which she played all seven games and ranked second in the competition for average kicks (13.7 per game) and third for tackles (52), Eva was selected on the wing in the 2018 AFL Women's All-Australian team and won the Gabrielle Trainor Medal as the Giants' best-and-fairest ahead of 2018 AFLW Players' Most Valuable Player Courtney Gum.

In November 2019, after inaugural Greater Western Sydney captain Amanda Farrugia announced her sudden retirement, Eva was announced as the club's new captain. Leading into the 2020 season, womens.afl journalist Sarah Black named Eva at no. 30 on her list of the top 30 players in the AFLW. Eva missed an AFLW match for the first time in 2020, missing rounds 5 and 6 with a foot injury, before returning to play in Greater Western Sydney's semi-final loss against Melbourne.

Eva was named among Greater Western Sydney's best players in its win over Gold Coast in round 1 of the 2022 season; she also won the maximum ten coaches' votes and was selected in womens.afl's Team of the Week for that round. In round 2, she was named among Greater Western Sydney's best players with a career-high 26 disposals in its loss to Fremantle; she polled eight coaches' votes and was also selected in womens.afl's Team of the Week for that round. Eva was named Greater Western Sydney's best player in its loss to North Melbourne in round 3 and was among Greater Western Sydney's best players in every other match for the season, polling five coaches' votes in round 10.

== Statistics ==
Updated to the end of the 2025 season.

Legend
| G | Goals | K | Kicks | D | Disposals | T | Tackles |
| B | Behinds | H | Handballs | M | Marks |

| Season | Team | No. | Games | Totals | | | | | | | Averages (per game) | | | | | | | Votes |
| Season | Team | No. | Games | G | B | K | H | D | M | T | G | B | K | H | D | M | T | Votes |
|---|---|---|---|---|---|---|---|---|---|---|---|---|---|---|---|---|---|---|
| 2017 | Collingwood | 2 | 7 | 3 | 1 | 63 | 16 | 79 | 16 | 31 | 0.4 | 0.1 | 9.0 | 2.3 | 11.3 | 2.3 | 4.4 | 0 |
| 2018 | Greater Western Sydney | 2 | 7 | 1 | 1 | 96 | 29 | 125 | 10 | 52 | 0.1 | 0.1 | 13.7 | 4.1 | 17.9 | 1.4 | 7.4 | 3 |
| 2019 | Greater Western Sydney | 2 | 7 | 2 | 1 | 90 | 29 | 119 | 15 | 20 | 0.3 | 0.1 | 12.9 | 4.1 | 17.0 | 2.1 | 2.9 | 5 |
| 2020 | Greater Western Sydney | 2 | 5 | 0 | 2 | 52 | 23 | 75 | 10 | 36 | 0.0 | 0.4 | 10.4 | 4.6 | 15.0 | 2.0 | 7.2 | 5 |
| 2021 | Greater Western Sydney | 2 | 9 | 1 | 2 | 108 | 41 | 149 | 16 | 38 | 0.1 | 0.2 | 12.0 | 4.6 | 16.6 | 1.8 | 4.2 | 1 |
| 2022 (S6) | Greater Western Sydney | 2 | 10 | 0 | 1 | 128 | 51 | 179 | 22 | 64 | 0.0 | 0.1 | 12.8 | 5.1 | 17.9 | 2.2 | 6.4 | 7 |
| 2022 (S7) | Greater Western Sydney | 2 | 10 | 0 | 2 | 108 | 52 | 160 | 15 | 41 | 0.0 | 0.2 | 10.8 | 5.2 | 16.0 | 1.5 | 4.1 | 3 |
| 2023 | Greater Western Sydney | 2 | 9 | 1 | 1 | 108 | 44 | 152 | 14 | 30 | 0.1 | 0.1 | 12.0 | 4.9 | 16.9 | 1.6 | 3.3 | 2 |
| 2024 | Greater Western Sydney | 2 | 11 | 7 | 5 | 81 | 30 | 111 | 18 | 58 | 0.6 | 0.5 | 7.4 | 2.7 | 10.1 | 1.7 | 5.3 | 0 |
| 2025 | Greater Western Sydney | 2 | 4 | 0 | 1 | 21 | 12 | 33 | 4 | 8 | 0.0 | 0.3 | 5.3 | 3.0 | 8.3 | 1.0 | 2.0 | 0 |
| Career | | | 79 | 16 | 17 | 854 | 327 | 1181 | 140 | 378 | 0.2 | 0.2 | 10.8 | 4.1 | 14.9 | 1.8 | 4.8 | 26 |

== Coaching career ==
Eva coached the Calder Cannons in the TAC Cup Girls competition in 2017, winning the competition's inaugural premiership, and led the NSW/ACT Youth Girls and Eastern Allies teams in the 2018 AFL Women's Under 18 Championships. She has served as a development coach of Greater Western Sydney's North East Australian Football League (NEAFL) team since 2018.

In September 2017, Eva was featured in the AFL Media series The Chase, where she spoke about her initially limited playing opportunities in women's Australian rules football and her time in coaching prior to the creation of the AFL Women's, as well as her coaching aspirations post-playing. In April 2019, Eva received the inaugural AFLCA coaching pathway scholarship, including a 12-month mentorship by then-Essendon coach John Worsfold; she was enrolled in the second intake of the AFL Women's Coaching Academy later that year. She later completed a study tour in the United States at the end of the AFL season as part of her scholarship.

== Personal life ==
Eva has been engaged to her fiancée Claudia Pope since 2024. The following year, in 2025, Pope gave birth to their son, Patrick Eva-Pope.

== Honours and achievements ==
- Greater Western Sydney captain: 2020–2023
- AFL Women's All-Australian team: 2018
- Gabrielle Trainor Medal: 2018
- Victoria representative honours in AFL Women's State of Origin: 2017
