= Erin McKinnon =

Australian rules footballer

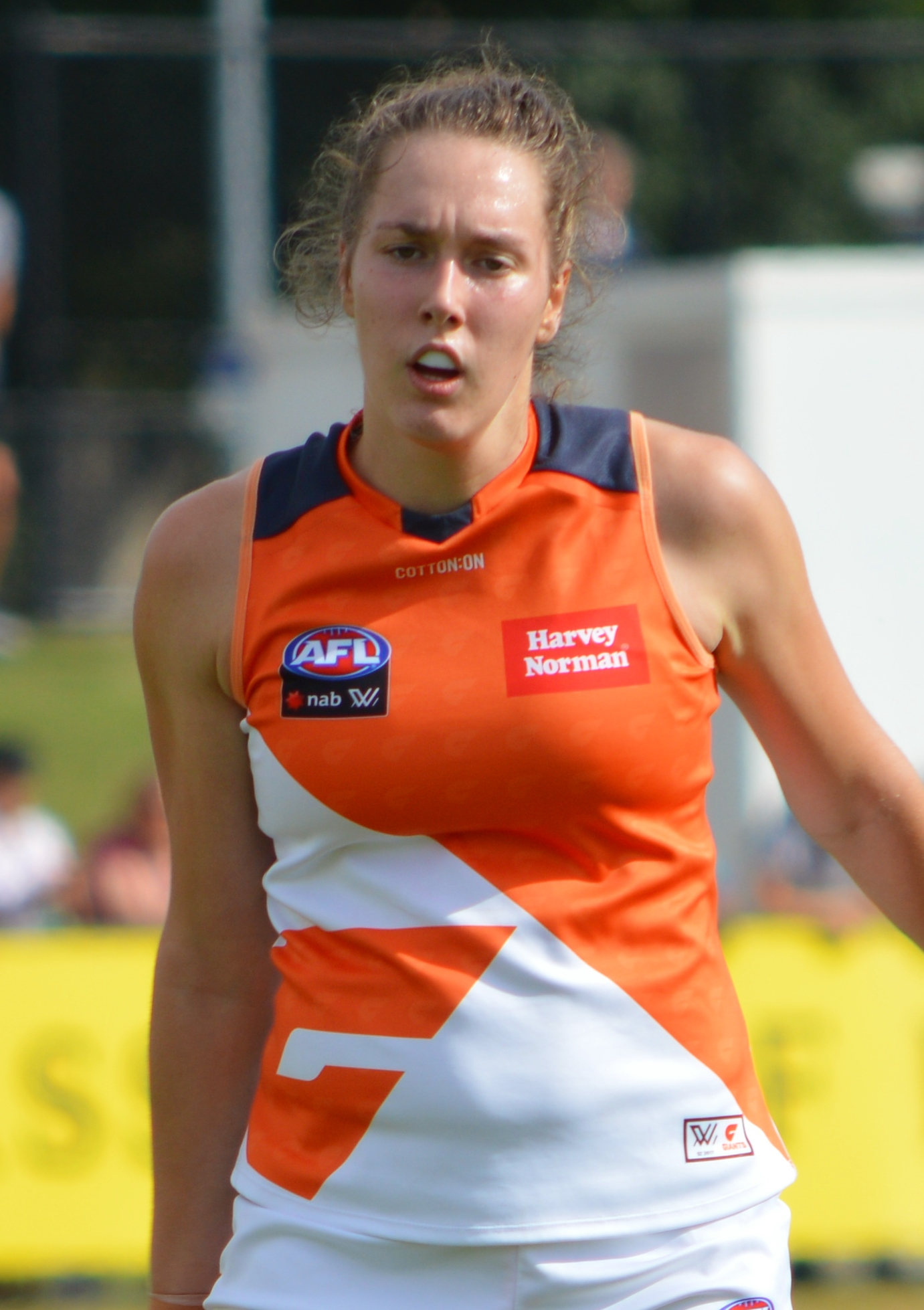
- McKinnon playing for Greater Western Sydney in February 2018

Personal information
- Born: 15 December 1998 (age 27); Melbourne, Victoria
- Original team: Mosman Swans (SWAFL)
- Draft: No. 48, 2016 AFL Women's draft
- Debut: Round 1, 2017, Greater Western Sydney vs. Adelaide, at Thebarton Oval
- Height: 189 cm (6 ft 2 in)
- Position: Ruck

Club information
- Current club: St Kilda

Playing career^{1}
Years	Club	Games (Goals)
2017–2022	Greater Western Sydney	41 (1)
S7 (2022)–	St Kilda	5 (0)
Total		46 (1)
- ^{1} Playing statistics correct to the end of the S7 (2022) season.

Career highlights
- AFL Women's All-Australian team: 2018

Erin McKinnon (born 15 December 1998) is an Australian rules footballer playing for St Kilda in the AFL Women's competition (AFLW). She previously played for Greater Western Sydney.

== Early life and junior football ==
McKinnon was born in Melbourne, Victoria before moving to Sydney's North Shore at a young age playing soccer, netball and basketball there. She gained an interest in the sport after watching her brother play Auskick. When the club advertised for female players she joined at age 12, but there were not enough players to field a team. McKinnon was part of the first Mosman Girls Youth team and after a few seens drew the attention of local recruiters due to height and athletic ability.

== AFLW career ==
McKinnon was drafted by Greater Western Sydney with the club's sixth selection and the forty eighth overall in the 2016 AFL Women's draft. She made her debut in Round 1, 2017, in the club's inaugural match against Adelaide at Thebarton Oval.

In June 2022, after requesting to leave Greater Western Sydney, she was traded to St Kilda.
