= Amy Lavell =

Australian rules footballer (born 1987)

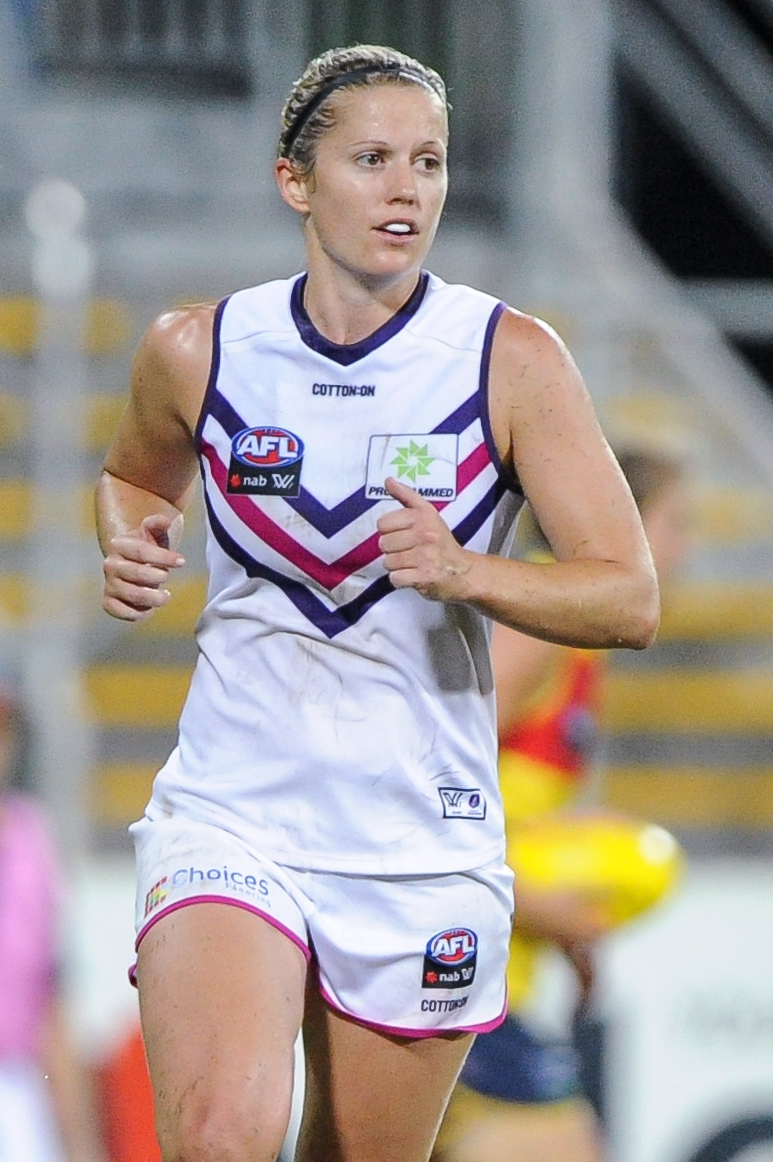
- Lavell playing for Fremantle in January 2018

Personal information
- Born: 20 February 1987 (age 39)
- Original team: Coastal Titans (WAWFL)
- Draft: No. 61, 2016 AFL Women's draft
- Debut: Round 1, 2017, Fremantle vs. Western Bulldogs, at VU Whitten Oval
- Height: 173 cm (5 ft 8 in)
- Position: Forward

Playing career^{1}
Years	Club	Games (Goals)
2017–2018	Fremantle	14 (8)
- ^{1} Playing statistics correct to the end of the 2018 season.

Career highlights
- Fremantle leading goalkicker: 2018

Amy Lavell (born 20 February 1987) is an Australian rules footballer who played for the Fremantle Football Club in the AFL Women's competition. Lavell was drafted by Fremantle with their eighth selection and sixty-first overall in the 2016 AFL Women's draft. She made her debut in the thirty-two point loss to the Western Bulldogs at VU Whitten Oval in the opening round of the 2017 season. She played every match in her debut season to finish with seven matches.

Lavell retired at the end of the 2018 AFL Women's season and played her last game against Carlton in the final round of the 2018 season; Fremantle won by 11 points to avoid the wooden spoon.

== Statistics ==
Statistics are correct to the end of the 2018 season.

Legend
G	Goals	K	Kicks	D	Disposals	T	Tackles
B	Behinds	H	Handballs	M	Marks

Season	Team	No.	Games	Totals							Averages (per game)						
Season	Team	No.	Games	G	B	K	H	D	M	T	G	B	K	H	D	M	T
2017	Fremantle	7	7	2	3	34	21	55	14	17	0.3	0.4	4.9	3.0	7.9	2.0	2.4
2018	Fremantle	7	7	6	2	26	14	40	10	8	0.9	0.3	3.7	2.0	5.7	1.4	1.1
Career			14	8	5	60	35	95	24	25	0.6	0.4	4.3	2.5	6.8	1.7	1.8
