= Hannah Scott (footballer) =

Australian rules footballer

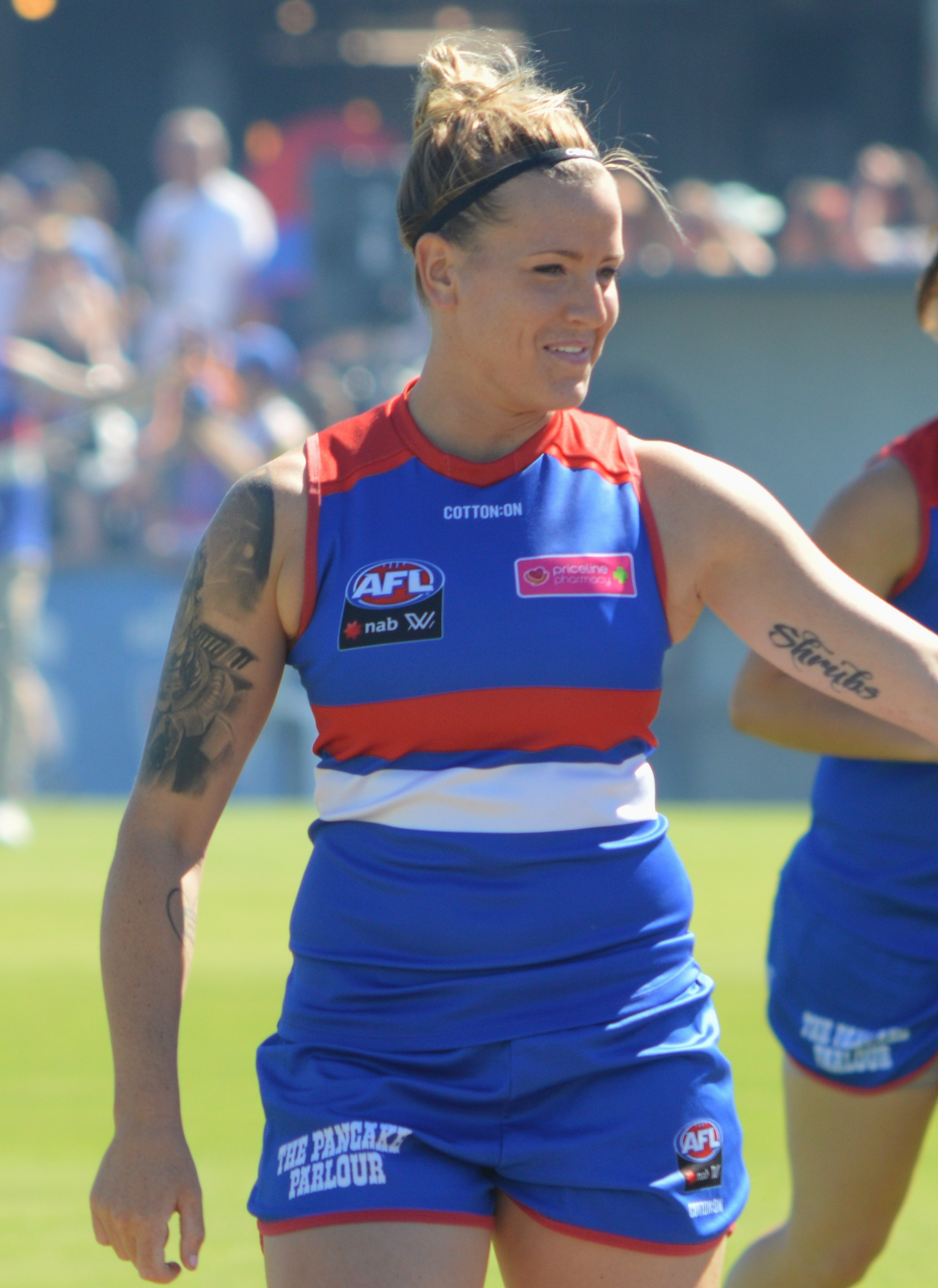
- Scott playing for the Western Bulldogs in February 2018

Personal information
- Born: 10 March 1990 (age 36)
- Original team: Eastern Devils (VFL Women's)
- Draft: No. 35, 2016 AFL Women's draft
- Debut: Round 1, 2017, Western Bulldogs vs. Fremantle, at VU Whitten Oval
- Height: 168 cm (5 ft 6 in)
- Position: Midfielder

Playing career^{1}
Years	Club	Games (Goals)
2017–2022 (S6)	Western Bulldogs	32 (2)
- ^{1} Playing statistics correct to the end of 2022 season 6.

Career highlights
- AFL Women's All-Australian team: 2018; AFL Women's Premiership Player 2018

Hannah Scott (born 10 March 1990) is a retired Australian rules footballer who played for the Western Bulldogs in the AFL Women's competition (AFLW).

== Career ==
She was drafted by the Bulldogs with the club's third selection and the twenty first overall in the 2016 AFL Women's draft. She made her debut in Round 1, 2017, in the club inaugural match against Fremantle at VU Whitten Oval. It was revealed that Scott had signed a contract extension with the club on 16 June 2021, after playing 5 games for the club that season. In May 2022, Scott retired from the game after not playing a single game in 2022 AFL Women's season 6 due to injuries.

== Statistics ==
Statistics are correct to the end of the 2021 season.

Legend
G	Goals	K	Kicks	D	Disposals	T	Tackles
B	Behinds	H	Handballs	M	Marks

Season	Team	No.	Games	Totals							Averages (per game)							Votes
Season	Team	No.	Games	G	B	K	H	D	M	T	G	B	K	H	D	M	T	Votes
2017	Western Bulldogs	22	7	1	0	68	21	89	15	23	0.1	0.0	9.7	3.0	12.7	2.1	3.3	3
2018^{#}	Western Bulldogs	22	8	1	0	63	21	84	14	27	0.1	0.0	7.9	2.6	10.5	1.8	3.4	0
2019	Western Bulldogs	22	7	0	0	70	11	81	12	18	0.0	0.0	10.0	1.6	11.6	1.7	2.6	1
2020	Western Bulldogs	22	5	0	0	38	12	50	12	15	0.0	0.0	7.6	2.4	10.0	2.4	3.0	0
2021	Western Bulldogs	22	5	0	0	32	7	39	7	11	0.0	0.0	6.4	1.4	7.8	1.4	2.2	0
2022 (S6)	Western Bulldogs	22	0	—	—	—	—	—	—	—	—	—	—	—	—	—	—	0
Career			32	2	0	271	72	343	60	94	0.1	0.0	8.5	2.3	10.7	1.9	2.9	4
