= Triple header =

Triple header or variant thereof, may refer to:

- Baseball tripleheader, three baseball games on the same day between the same two teams, see Doubleheader (baseball)#Tripleheaders
- Television tripleheader, three telecast games in the same sport televised back-to-back, see Doubleheader (television)
- Triple-header, a train that has been triple-headed through triple-heading a train, see Double-heading
- Penzoil/VIP Tripleheader, NASCAR race, former name of the UNOH 175
- "Triple Header", a 1983 story of The Railway Series book "Really Useful Engines"
