= Christina Bernardi =

Australian rules footballer (born 1990)

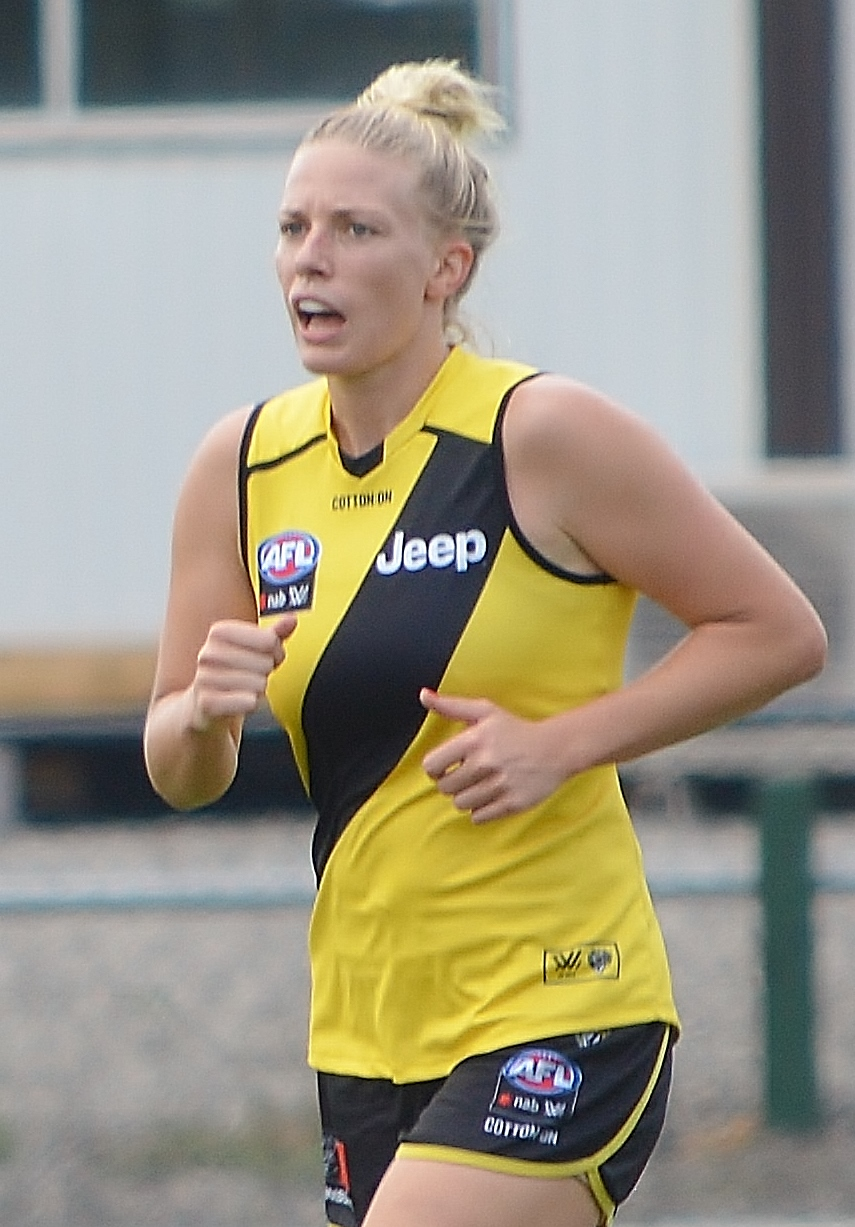
- Bernardi with Richmond in January 2020

Personal information
- Full name: Christina Bernardi
- Born: 7 June 1990 (age 36)
- Original team: Diamond Creek (VFLW)
- Draft: No. 132, 2016 national draft
- Debut: Round 1, 2017, Collingwood vs. Carlton, at IKON Park
- Height: 167 cm (5 ft 6 in)
- Weight: 65 kg (143 lb)
- Position: Midfielder / forward

Club information
- Current club: Carlton
- Number: 44

Playing career^{1}
Years	Club	Games (Goals)
2017–2018	Collingwood	13 (11)
2019	Greater Western Sydney	7 (7)
2020–2022 (S6)	Richmond	19 (12)
2022 (S7)	Carlton	1 (0)
Total		40 (30)
- ^{1} Playing statistics correct to the end of 2022 season 7.

Career highlights
- AFL Women's All-Australian team: 2018; Collingwood leading goalkicker: 2018

Christina Bernardi (born 7 June 1990) is an Australian rules footballer who has played for Collingwood, Greater Western Sydney, Richmond and Carlton in the AFL Women's (AFLW). In 2018, she was Collingwood's leading goalkicker and was selected in the All-Australian team.

== Early life ==
Bernardi was introduced to football by future teammate and captain Steph Chiocci, after they met at RMIT University where they studied teaching, and played for the RMIT Redbacks. She joined VFLW club Diamond Creek in 2012. After kicking 33 goals in the 2016 season as a small forward, she missed the grand final against Darebin Falcons due to having committed to a volunteering trip in South Africa.

== AFL Women's career ==
=== Collingwood (2017–2018) ===
In October 2016, Bernardi was drafted by Collingwood, joining 13 other players from Diamond Creek who were drafted to AFLW clubs. She played in a pre-season practice match against the Western Bulldogs, scoring Collingwood's first goal. She made her debut in round 1, 2017, in the inaugural AFLW match at IKON Park against Carlton.

Collingwood re-signed Bernardi for the 2018 season during the trade period in May 2017.

=== Greater Western Sydney (2019) ===
Ahead of the 2019 season, Bernardi was traded to Greater Western Sydney as part of a 5-way deal, including Talia Radan and 12 picks.

=== Richmond (2020–2022 (S6)) ===
Bernardi joined Richmond in the expansion club signing period in April 2019. In May 2022, she was delisted by Richmond.

=== Carlton (2022 (S7)) ===
In September 2022, Bernardi was added to Carlton's list after injuries meant the club wouldn't have been able to field a 24-person squad. She debuted for the club in Round 5 against Melbourne.

On 13 March 2023, Bernardi was announced as the VFLW captain for 2023.

== Statistics ==
Statistics are correct to the end of the 2021 season.

Legend
G	Goals	K	Kicks	D	Disposals	T	Tackles
B	Behinds	H	Handballs	M	Marks

Season	Team	No.	Games	Totals							Averages (per game)						
Season	Team	No.	Games	G	B	K	H	D	M	T	G	B	K	H	D	M	T
2017	Collingwood	6	6	2	3	35	7	42	13	7	0.3	0.5	5.8	1.2	7.0	2.2	1.2
2018	Collingwood	6	7	9	3	67	13	80	30	15	1.3	0.4	9.6	1.9	11.4	4.3	2.1
2019	Greater Western Sydney	4	7	7	6	44	15	59	15	15	1.0	0.9	6.3	2.1	8.4	2.1	2.1
2020	Richmond	6	6	3	6	33	13	46	10	10	0.5	1.0	5.5	2.2	7.7	1.7	1.7
2021	Richmond	6	6	4	1	29	11	40	9	21	0.7	0.2	4.8	1.8	6.7	1.5	3.5
Career			32	25	20	208	59	267	77	68	0.8	0.6	6.5	1.8	8.3	2.4	2.1

== Personal life ==
Outside of football, Bernardi is a physical education teacher at Ivanhoe Grammar School.

== Honours and achievements ==
- Individual
  - AFL Women's All-Australian team: 2018
  - Collingwood leading goalkicker: 2018
  - Greater Western Sydney leading goalkicker: 2019
