= 2018 AFL Women's All-Australian team =

- Sponsored by: Virgin Australia
- Date: 27 March 2018
- Venue: Docklands Stadium
- Country: Australia

The 2018 AFL Women's All-Australian team represents the best-performed players of the 2018 AFL Women's season. It was announced on 27 March 2018 as a complete women's Australian rules football team of 21 players, the first time that this happened after teams in the AFL Women's were reduced from 22 players following the competition's inaugural season. The team is honorary and does not play any games.

== Initial squad ==
The initial 40-woman All-Australian squad was announced on 21 March. Collingwood and Melbourne had the most players selected in the initial squad with seven each, while grand finalists Brisbane and the Western Bulldogs had six each. Twelve players from the 2017 team were among those selected.

Club	Total	Player(s)
Adelaide	4	Sarah Allan, Ange Foley, Ebony Marinoff, Chelsea Randall
Brisbane	6	Ally Anderson, Emily Bates, Sabrina Frederick-Traub, Leah Kaslar, Kate Lutkins, Jess Wuetschner
Carlton	2	Tayla Harris, Breann Moody
Collingwood	7	Christina Bernardi, Steph Chiocci, Jess Duffin, Jasmine Garner, Emma King, Jaimee Lambert, Chloe Molloy
Fremantle	3	Ebony Antonio, Kara Donnellan, Dana Hooker
Greater Western Sydney	5	Alicia Eva, Courtney Gum, Erin McKinnon, Phoebe McWilliams, Pepa Randall
Melbourne	7	Richelle Cranston, Tegan Cunningham, Meg Downie, Bianca Jakobsson, Elise O'Dea, Karen Paxman, Daisy Pearce
Western Bulldogs	6	Libby Birch, Ellie Blackburn, Monique Conti, Emma Kearney, Brooke Lochland, Hannah Scott

== Final team ==
The final team was announced on 27 March. Melbourne and grand finalists Brisbane and the Western Bulldogs had the most representatives with four each, and every team again had at least one representative. Nine players from the 2017 team were among those selected. Adelaide co-captain Chelsea Randall was announced as the All-Australian captain and Melbourne captain Daisy Pearce, the previous year's All-Australian captain, was announced as the vice-captain.

2018 AFL Women's All-Australian team
B:	Chloe Molloy (Collingwood)	Kate Lutkins (Brisbane)	
HB:	Hannah Scott (Western Bulldogs)	Chelsea Randall (Adelaide) (captain)	Ebony Antonio (Fremantle)
C:	Dana Hooker (Fremantle)	Emma Kearney (Western Bulldogs)	Alicia Eva (Greater Western Sydney)
HF:	Elise O'Dea (Melbourne)	Sabrina Frederick-Traub (Brisbane)	Brooke Lochland (Western Bulldogs)
F:	Jess Wuetschner (Brisbane)	Christina Bernardi (Collingwood)	
Foll:	Erin McKinnon (Greater Western Sydney)	Courtney Gum (Greater Western Sydney)	Daisy Pearce (Melbourne) (vice-captain)
Int:	Emily Bates (Brisbane)	Tayla Harris (Carlton)	Karen Paxman (Melbourne)
Int:	Ellie Blackburn (Western Bulldogs)	Meg Downie (Melbourne)	
Coach:	Paul Groves (Western Bulldogs)		

Note: the position of coach in the AFL Women's All-Australian team is traditionally awarded to the coach of the premiership-winning team.
