= Courtney Gum =

Australian rules footballer

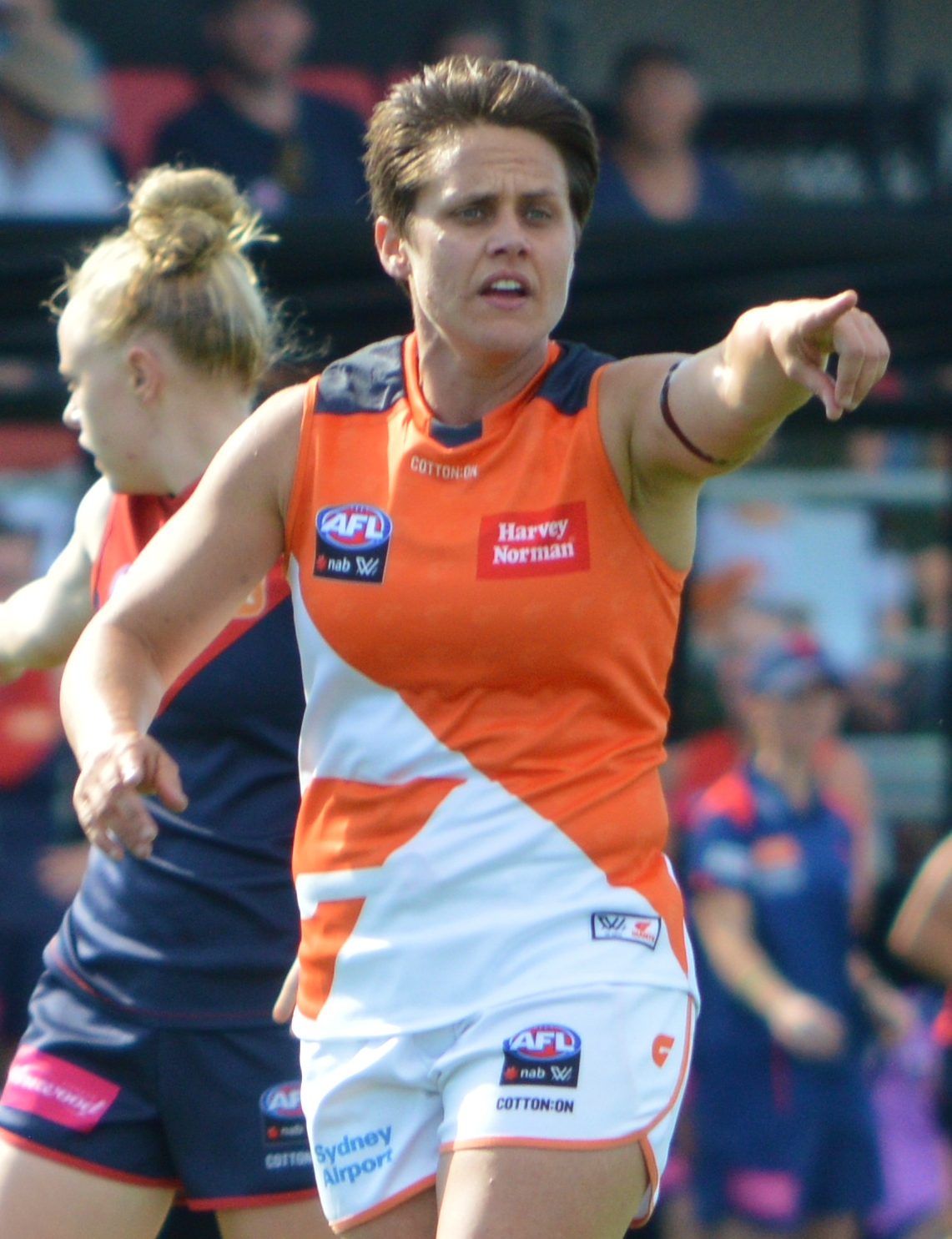
- Gum playing for Greater Western Sydney in February 2018

Personal information
- Born: 25 September 1981 (age 45)
- Original teams: UNSW ES Stingrays Adelaide University (Adelaide FL); South Adelaide (SANFLW)
- Draft: No. 25, 2017 AFL Women's draft No. 83, 2019 AFL Women's draft
- Debut: Round 1, 2018, Greater Western Sydney vs. Melbourne, at Casey Fields
- Height: 170 cm (5 ft 7 in)
- Position: Midfielder

Playing career^{1}
| Years | Club | Games (Goals) |
| 2018–2019 | Greater Western Sydney | 14 (5) |
| 2020 | Adelaide | 6 (3) |
| Total | | 20 (8) |
- ^{1} Playing statistics correct to the end of the 2020 season.

Career highlights
- SANFLW best and fairest: 2017; AFLPA MVP: 2018; AFL Women's All-Australian team: 2018

Courtney Gum (born 25 September 1981) is a retired Australian rules footballer who most recently played for the Adelaide Football Club in the AFL Women's competition (AFLW). She previously played two seasons with the Greater Western Sydney before announcing a retirement in 2019, then reneging to reenter the AFLW draft later that same year.

== Career ==
After winning best and fairest in the inaugural season of the SANFL Statewide Super Women's League, Gum was drafted by Greater Western Sydney with their third selection and twenty-fifth overall in the 2017 AFL Women's draft. She made her debut in the six point loss to Melbourne at Casey Fields in the opening round of the 2018 season. For her outstanding season she was named the AFL Players Association's Most Valuable Player in 2018.

Gum announced her retirement in March at the end of the 2019 season. She reneged on this retirement and nominated for the following draft period, before being selected by Adelaide with the 83rd overall pick in the 2019 AFL Women's draft held in October of that year.

== Persona life ==
Gum lives with her partner Krissie Steen and son Buz.
