= 2018 AFL Women's season =

Second season of the AFL Women's (AFLW) competition

Overview
- Date: 2 February – 24 March 2018
- Teams: 8
- Premiers: Western Bulldogs; 1st premiership
- Runners-up: Brisbane; 2nd runners-up result
- Minor premiers: Western Bulldogs; 1st minor premiership
- Best and fairest: Emma Kearney (Western Bulldogs); 14 votes
- Leading goalkicker: Brooke Lochland (Western Bulldogs); 12 goals

Attendance
- Matches played: 29
- Total attendance: 174,012 (6,000 per match)
- Highest: 41,975 (round 2, Fremantle v Collingwood)

The 2018 AFL Women's season was the second season of the AFL Women's (AFLW) competition, the highest-level senior women's Australian rules football competition in Australia. The season featured eight clubs and ran from 2 February to 24 March, comprising a seven-round home-and-away season followed by a grand final contested by the top two clubs.

The Western Bulldogs won the premiership, defeating Brisbane by six points in the 2018 AFL Women's Grand Final. The Bulldogs also won the minor premiership by finishing atop the home-and-away ladder with a 5–2 win–loss record. The Bulldogs' Emma Kearney won the AFL Women's best and fairest award as the league's best and fairest player, and teammate Brooke Lochland won the AFL Women's leading goalkicker award as the league's leading goalkicker.

== Rule changes ==
Three rules were changed heading into the 2018 season:

- A free kick is paid against a player who last touches the ball before it goes out of bounds under the following conditions,

- A free kick will be awarded against a player who kicks or handballs the football over the boundary line without the football being touched by another player;
- Except where a player who does not have possession stops the football being touched by an opposition player by shepherding the football across the boundary line where the football could have otherwise been touched.
- If in doubt the umpires are instructed to throw the ball in.

- The interchange has been reduced to five players from six players in 2017.
- Time-on will occur during the last two minutes of each quarter.

== Home-and-away season ==
The full fixture was released on Friday 27 October 2017. Notable features of the draw include:

- Unlike the previous season, there were no double-headers with men's preseason matches.
- Adelaide, Fremantle, Greater Western Sydney and Melbourne each played four home games, while the other four clubs played three.
- Adelaide, Collingwood, GWS, and Melbourne each hosted matches at grounds outside of their home metropolitan area with trips to Darwin, Moe, Canberra and Alice Springs respectively.
- Carlton and Collingwood featured in the most free-to-air televised matches (three), Adelaide, Brisbane, Melbourne and the Western Bulldogs had two each, while GWS and Fremantle had one each.
- Many games were scheduled for the late afternoon to avoid the summer heat, especially in Brisbane and Western Australia.
- All starting times are local.

=== Round 1 ===
| | Round 1 |
| Friday, 2 February (7:40 pm) | Carlton 3.4 (22) | def. | Collingwood 2.2 (14) | Ikon Park (crowd: 19,852) | Report |
| Saturday, 3 February (5:05 pm) | Melbourne 7.3 (45) | def. | Greater Western Sydney 6.3 (39) | Casey Fields (crowd: 5,100) | Report |
| Saturday, 3 February (6:45 pm) | Adelaide 3.1 (19) | def. by | Brisbane 4.7 (31) | Norwood Oval (crowd: 11,120) | Report |
| Sunday, 4 February (4:35 pm) | Western Bulldogs 7.7 (49) | def. | Fremantle 3.5 (23) | VU Whitten Oval (crowd: 8,500) | Report |

=== Round 2 ===
| | Round 2 |
| Friday, 9 February (7:05 pm) | Greater Western Sydney 1.3 (9) | def. by | Carlton 3.12 (30) | Drummoyne Oval (crowd: 4,952) | Report |
| Saturday, 10 February (5:05 pm) | Melbourne 8.8 (56) | def. | Adelaide 4.0 (24) | Casey Fields (crowd: 3,800) | Report |
| Saturday, 10 February (4:10 pm) | Fremantle 6.4 (40) | def. | Collingwood 4.3 (27) | Optus Stadium (crowd: 41,975) | Report |
| Sunday, 11 February (3:35 pm) | Brisbane 3.6 (24) | def. by | Western Bulldogs 5.3 (33) | South Pine Sports Complex (crowd: 5,300) | Report |
The Fremantle vs Collingwood match was the first football event played at the newly-constructed Perth Stadium. It was also the only ticketed match of the season and all 54,000 available tickets were sold in advance of the match.

=== Round 3 ===
| | Round 3 |
| Saturday, 17 February (1:35 pm) | Adelaide 6.5 (41) | def. | Western Bulldogs 5.4 (34) | Norwood Oval (crowd: 4,900) | Report |
| Saturday, 17 February (7:40 pm) | Carlton 2.6 (18) | def. by | Brisbane 6.4 (40) | Ikon Park (crowd: 6,200) | Report |
| Sunday, 18 February (4:35 pm) | Collingwood 5.5 (35) | def. by | Greater Western Sydney 7.6 (48) | Olympic Park Oval (crowd: 3,600) | Report |
| Sunday, 18 February (3:35 pm) | Fremantle 6.0 (36) | def. | Melbourne 4.7 (31) | Fremantle Oval (crowd: 3,125) | Report |

=== Round 4 ===
| | Round 4 |
| Friday, 23 February (7:05 pm) | Western Bulldogs 12.14 (86) | def. | Carlton 2.1 (13) | VU Whitten Oval (crowd: 8,987) | Report |
| Saturday, 24 February (3:35 pm) | Brisbane 3.4 (22) | def. | Fremantle 2.3 (15) | South Pine Sports Complex (crowd: 1,500) | Report |
| Saturday, 24 February (5:40 pm) | Melbourne 3.6 (24) | def. by | Collingwood 9.4 (58) | TIO Traeger Park (crowd: 2,000) | Report |
| Sunday, 25 February (4:35 pm) | Greater Western Sydney 2.7 (19) | drew with | Adelaide 2.7 (19) | Blacktown International Sportspark (crowd: 2,409) | Report |
The Western Bulldogs' score of 12.14 (86) was, at the time, the highest score in a AFL Women's premiership match.; Brooke Lochland's seven goals in the match against Carlton is the most of any AFL Women's player in a single match to date.; Lauren Arnell kicked Carlton's entire score of 2.1 (13)

=== Round 5 ===
| | Round 5 |
| Friday, 2 March (7:05 pm) | Melbourne 4.10 (34) | def. | Brisbane 4.4 (28) | Casey Fields (crowd: 2,100) | Report |
| Saturday, 3 March (2:05 pm) | Fremantle 3.3 (21) | def. by | Greater Western Sydney 6.3 (39) | Fremantle Oval (crowd: 2,571) | Report |
| Saturday, 3 March (6:40 pm) | Adelaide 8.7 (55) | def. | Carlton 2.8 (20) | Norwood Oval (crowd: 5,970) | Report |
| Sunday, 4 March (2:35 pm) | Collingwood 6.5 (41) | def. by | Western Bulldogs 7.7 (49) | Ted Summerton Reserve (crowd: 2,700) | Report |

=== Round 6 ===
| | Round 6 |
| Friday, 9 March (5:35 pm) | Adelaide 6.4 (40) | def. | Fremantle 5.6 (36) | TIO Stadium (crowd: 2,159) | Report |
| Saturday, 10 March (3:35 pm) | Brisbane 5.9 (39) | def. by | Collingwood 8.5 (53) | Moreton Bay Central Sports Complex (crowd: 2,600) | Report |
| Saturday, 10 March (7:10 pm) | Greater Western Sydney 7.4 (46) | def. | Western Bulldogs 4.4 (28) | UNSW Canberra Oval (crowd: 4,146) | Report |
| Sunday, 11 March (4:35 pm) | Carlton 3.4 (22) | def. by | Melbourne 8.9 (57) | Ikon Park (crowd: 6,300) | Report |

=== Round 7 ===
| | Round 7 |
| Friday, 16 March (7:05 pm) | Greater Western Sydney 3.6 (24) | def. by | Brisbane 10.4 (64) | Blacktown International Sportspark (crowd: 2,253) | Report |
| Saturday, 17 March (2:05 pm) | Fremantle 9.5 (59) | def. | Carlton 6.12 (48) | Fremantle Oval (crowd: 2,751) | Report |
| Saturday, 17 March (7:10 pm) | Western Bulldogs 5.3 (33) | def. | Melbourne 4.7 (31) | VU Whitten Oval (crowd: 7,593) | Report |
| Sunday, 18 March (2:35 pm) | Collingwood 8.5 (53) | def. | Adelaide 4.8 (32) | Olympic Park Oval (crowd: 2,300) | Report |

== Ladder ==
| Pos | Team | Pld | W | L | D | PF | PA | PP | Pts | Qualification |
|---|---|---|---|---|---|---|---|---|---|---|
| 1 | Western Bulldogs (P) | 7 | 5 | 2 | 0 | 312 | 219 | 142.5 | 20 | Grand Final |
| 2 | Brisbane | 7 | 4 | 3 | 0 | 248 | 196 | 126.5 | 16 | Grand Final |
| 3 | Melbourne | 7 | 4 | 3 | 0 | 278 | 240 | 115.8 | 16 | |
| 4 | Greater Western Sydney | 7 | 3 | 3 | 1 | 224 | 242 | 92.6 | 14 | |
| 5 | Adelaide | 7 | 3 | 3 | 1 | 230 | 249 | 92.4 | 14 | |
| 6 | Collingwood | 7 | 3 | 4 | 0 | 281 | 254 | 110.6 | 12 | |
| 7 | Fremantle | 7 | 3 | 4 | 0 | 230 | 256 | 89.8 | 12 | |
| 8 | Carlton | 7 | 2 | 5 | 0 | 173 | 320 | 54.1 | 8 | |

Source: AFL.com.au
Rules for classification: 1) points; 2) percentage; 3) number of points for.
(P) Premiers

== Progression by round ==
- Numbers highlighted in green indicates the team finished the round inside the top 2.
- Numbers highlighted in blue indicates the team finished in first place on the ladder in that round.
- Numbers highlighted in red indicates the team finished in last place on the ladder in that round.

| | Team | 1 | 2 | 3 | 4 | 5 | 6 | 7 |
|---|---|---|---|---|---|---|---|---|
| 1 | Western Bulldogs | 4 | 8 | 8 | 12 | 16 | 16 | 20 |
| 2 | Brisbane | 4 | 4 | 8 | 12 | 12 | 12 | 16 |
| 3 | Melbourne | 4 | 8 | 8 | 8 | 12 | 16 | 16 |
| 4 | Greater Western Sydney | 0 | 0 | 4 | 6 | 10 | 14 | 14 |
| 5 | Adelaide | 0 | 0 | 4 | 6 | 10 | 14 | 14 |
| 6 | Collingwood | 0 | 0 | 0 | 4 | 4 | 8 | 12 |
| 7 | Fremantle | 0 | 4 | 8 | 8 | 8 | 8 | 12 |
| 8 | Carlton | 4 | 8 | 8 | 8 | 8 | 8 | 8 |

== Grand final ==
In the absence of a finals series, the two teams who finished the highest on the ladder at the end of the home and away season played in the AFL Women's Grand Final.

| | Grand Final |
| Saturday, 24 March (12:35 pm) | Western Bulldogs 4.3 (27) | def. | Brisbane 3.3 (21) | Ikon Park (crowd: 7,083) |

== Win–loss table ==
| + | Win | Qualified for finals |
| − | Loss | Eliminated |

| Team | 1 | 2 | 3 | 4 | 5 | 6 | 7 | GF | Ladder |
|---|---|---|---|---|---|---|---|---|---|
| Adelaide | BL; 12 | Mel; 32 | WB; 7 | GWS; 0 | Car; 35 | Fre; 4 | Col; 21 | X | 5 |
| Brisbane | Ade; 12 | WB; 9 | Car; 22 | Fre; 7 | Mel; 6 | Col; 14 | GWS; 40 | WB; 6 | 2 |
| Carlton | Col; 8 | GWS; 21 | BL; 22 | WB; 73 | Ade; 35 | Mel; 35 | Fre; 11 | X | 8 |
| Collingwood | Car; 8 | Fre; 13 | GWS; 13 | Mel; 34 | WB; 8 | BL; 14 | Ade; 21 | X | 6 |
| Fremantle | WB; 26 | Col; 13 | Mel; 5 | BL; 7 | GWS; 18 | Ade; 4 | Car; 11 | X | 7 |
| Greater Western Sydney | Mel; 6 | Car; 21 | Col; 13 | Ade; 0 | Fre; 18 | WB; 18 | BL; 40 | X | 4 |
| Melbourne | GWS; 6 | Ade; 32 | Fre; 5 | Col; 34 | BL; 6 | Car; 35 | WB; 2 | X | 3 |
| Western Bulldogs | Fre; 26 | BL; 9 | Ade; 7 | Car; 73 | Col; 8 | GWS; 18 | Mel; 2 | BL; 6 | 1 |

== Attendances ==
=== By club ===
2018 AFL Women's attendances
| Club | Total | Games | Avg. per game | Home total | Home games | Home avg. |
|---|---|---|---|---|---|---|
| Adelaide | 32,658 | 7 | 4,665 | 24,149 | 4 | 6,037 |
| Brisbane | 31,073 | 7 | 4,439 | 9,400 | 3 | 3,133 |
| Carlton | 52,261 | 6 | 8,710 | 32,352 | 3 | 10,784 |
| Collingwood | 75,027 | 7 | 10,718 | 8,600 | 3 | 2,867 |
| Fremantle | 59,830 | 6 | 9,972 | 47,671 | 3 | 15,890 |
| Greater Western Sydney | 25,031 | 7 | 3,576 | 13,760 | 4 | 3,440 |
| Melbourne | 30,018 | 7 | 4,288 | 13,000 | 4 | 3,250 |
| Western Bulldogs | 42,126 | 7 | 6,018 | 25,080 | 3 | 8,360 |

=== By ground ===
2018 ground attendances
| Ground | Total | Games | Avg. per game |
|---|---|---|---|
| Blacktown International Sportspark | 2,409 | 1 | 2,409 |
| Casey Fields | 11,000 | 3 | 3,667 |
| Drummoyne Oval | 4,952 | 1 | 4,952 |
| Fremantle Oval | 5,696 | 2 | 2,848 |
| Ikon Park | 32,352 | 3 | 10,784 |
| Moreton Bay Central Sports Complex | 2,600 | 1 | 2,600 |
| Norwood Oval | 21,990 | 3 | 7,330 |
| Olympic Park Oval | 5,900 | 2 | 2,950 |
| Optus Stadium | 41,975 | 1 | 41,975 |
| South Pine Sports Complex | 6,800 | 2 | 3,400 |
| Ted Summerton Reserve | 2,700 | 1 | 2,700 |
| TIO Stadium | 2,159 | 1 | 2,159 |
| TIO Traeger Park | 2,000 | 1 | 2,000 |
| UNSW Canberra Oval | 4,146 | 1 | 4,146 |
| VU Whitten Oval | 25,080 | 3 | 8,360 |

== Awards ==
- The league best and fairest was awarded to Emma Kearney.
- The leading goalkicker was awarded to Brooke Lochland of the Western Bulldogs, who kicked twelve goals during the home and away season.
- The Rising Star was awarded to Chloe Molloy.
- The best on ground in the AFL Women's Grand Final was awarded to Monique Conti.
- The goal of the year was awarded to Aliesha Newman.
- The mark of the year was awarded to Tayla Harris.
- The minor premiership was awarded to Western Bulldogs.
- AFLW Players Association awards
  - The most valuable player was awarded to Courtney Gum.
  - The most courageous player was awarded to Chelsea Randall.
  - The best captain was awarded to Daisy Pearce.
  - The best first year player was awarded to Chloe Molloy.
- Chelsea Randall was named the captain of the 2018 AFL Women's All-Australian team. The grand finalists, Western Bulldogs and Brisbane Lions, along with Melbourne each had 4 players selected, with all eight clubs represented in the final team by at least one player.
- The wooden spoon was "awarded" to Carlton.

=== Best and fairest ===
| Club | Award name | Player | Ref. |
|---|---|---|---|
| Adelaide | Club Champion | Chelsea Randall | |
| Brisbane | Best and fairest | Kate Lutkins | |
| Carlton | Best and fairest | Katie Loynes | |
| Carlton | Best and fairest | Breann Moody | |
| Collingwood | Best and fairest | Chloe Molloy | |
| Fremantle | Fairest and best | Ebony Antonio | |
| Greater Western Sydney | Gabrielle Trainor Medal | Alicia Eva | |
| Melbourne | Best and fairest | Daisy Pearce | |
| Western Bulldogs | Susan Alberti Award | Emma Kearney | |

=== AFLW leading goalkicker ===
- Numbers highlighted in blue indicates the player led the season's goal kicking tally at the end of that round.
- Underlined numbers indicates the player did not play that round.

| | Player | 1 | 2 | 3 | 4 | 5 | 6 | 7 | Total |
| 1 | Brooke Lochland | 1_{1} | 0_{1} | 1_{2} | 7_{9} | 2_{11} | 0_{11} | 1_{12} | 12 |
| 2 | Jess Wuetschner | 2_{2} | 2_{4} | 1_{5} | 2_{7} | 0_{7} | 1_{8} | 3_{11} | 11 |
| 3 | Christina Bernardi | 0_{0} | 2_{2} | 0_{2} | 1_{3} | 1_{4} | 3_{7} | 2_{9} | 9 |
| 3 | Tegan Cunningham | 1_{1} | 2_{3} | 2_{5} | 0_{5} | 1_{6} | 3_{9} | 0_{9} | 9 |
| 5 | Sabrina Frederick-Traub | 0_{0} | 0_{0} | 0_{0} | 0_{0} | 3_{3} | 1_{4} | 4_{8} | 8 |
| 5 | Moana Hope | 0_{0} | 0_{0} | 2_{2} | 2_{4} | 0_{4} | 3_{7} | 1_{8} | 8 |
| 7 | Phoebe McWilliams | 3_{3} | 1_{4} | 2_{6} | 0_{6} | 1_{7} | 0_{7} | 0_{7} | 7 |
| 7 | Erin Phillips | 0_{0} | 0_{0} | 4_{4} | 0_{4} | 0_{4} | 3_{7} | 0_{7} | 7 |
| 7 | Ruth Wallace | 1_{1} | 1_{2} | 0_{2} | 1_{3} | 3_{6} | 0_{6} | 1_{7} | 7 |
| 10 | Katie Brennan | 3_{3} | 0_{3} | 2_{5} | 0_{5} | 0_{5} | 0_{5} | 1_{6} | 6 |
| 10 | Kate Hore | 1_{1} | 0_{1} | 0_{1} | 1_{2} | 1_{3} | 2_{5} | 1_{6} | 6 |
| 10 | Amy Lavell | 2_{2} | 1_{3} | 1_{4} | 0_{4} | 0_{4} | 0_{4} | 2_{6} | 6 |

== Coach changes ==
| Club | Outgoing coach | Manner of departure | Date of vacancy | Incoming coach | Date of appointment |
|---|---|---|---|---|---|
| Carlton | Damien Keeping | Mutual termination | 20 March 2018 | Daniel Harford | 23 April 2018 |
| Adelaide | Bec Goddard | Resigned | 13 April 2018 | Matthew Clarke | 23 May 2018 |
| Fremantle | Michelle Cowan | Resigned | 19 April 2018 | Trent Cooper | 7 June 2018 |

== Club leadership ==
| Club | Coach | Captain(s) | Vice-captain(s) | Leadership group | Ref |
|---|---|---|---|---|---|
| Adelaide | Bec Goddard | Erin Phillips, Chelsea Randall | Courtney Cramey, Ange Foley, Sally Riley | | |
| Brisbane | Craig Starcevich | Emma Zielke | Leah Kaslar | Emily Bates, Sabrina Frederick-Traub, Kate Lutkins, Sharni Webb | |
| Carlton | Damien Keeping (Rds 1, 4–7) | Brianna Davey | Lauren Arnell, Sarah Hosking | | |
| Carlton | Nick Rutley (Rds 2–3) | Brianna Davey | Lauren Arnell, Sarah Hosking | | |
| Collingwood | Wayne Siekman | Steph Chiocci | Brittany Bonnici, Emma Grant | Christina Bernardi, Ashleigh Brazill, Emma King | |
| Fremantle | Michelle Cowan | Kara Donnellan | Kiara Bowers, Amy Lavell | | |
| Greater Western Sydney | Alan McConnell | Amanda Farrugia | Alicia Eva | Jessica Dal Pos, Tanya Hetherington, Emma Swanson | |
| Melbourne | Mick Stinear | Daisy Pearce | Melissa Hickey, Elise O'Dea | | |
| Western Bulldogs | Paul Groves | Katie Brennan | | Ellie Blackburn, Nicole Callinan, Hannah Scott | |

== See also ==
- 2017 AFL Women's draft
