= Doubleheader (television) =

Two games involving the same sport broadcasting on the same day

A doubleheader is a term used by television networks to refer to two games involving the same sport that are shown back-to-back on the same network, even though the events do not involve the same two teams (three such games may be referred to as a tripleheader, this scenario occurring most frequently in regard to basketball). A doubleheader purposely coincides with a league's scheduling of "early" and "late" games. In North America, games usually start at the same time period in different time zones (Eastern and Pacific). The concept is less often extended to three games—a tripleheader—or, much more rarely, a quadrupleheader of four games.

== American football ==
=== National Football League ===
National Football League (NFL) games played in the afternoon usually start around 1pm. or 4:25 pm Eastern Time, creating a 1:00/4:25 p.m. doubleheader in the Eastern Time Zone and a 10:00 a.m./1:25 p.m. doubleheader in the Pacific Time Zone.

The two networks that hold the rights to broadcast NFL games on Sunday afternoons – Fox and CBS – both typically air doubleheaders during the regular season (with the other network only being permitted to broadcast one game in a specific market; each network is given eight doubleheaders to broadcast during the season, and both networks are given doubleheaders during the first and final week of the season in order for games with playoff implications to have the most exposure), with restrictions applying to some markets in which the local team is playing at home that week. When combined with the Sunday night game on NBC, this creates a tripleheader (as was sometimes advertised by the league's radio partner, Westwood One, which carried three games in a tripleheader format).

Since 2006, Week 1 of the NFL regular season also features a doubleheader on Monday Night Football (which moved from ABC to ESPN concurrent with the change), with the late-evening game involving two West Coast teams. This alleviates a quirk in the NFL television contract where there is no Monday game in the final week of the regular season in order to allow all playoff teams to have an equal number of days off between the final regular season and first playoff game.

A daytime doubleheader occurred on October 26, 2014, when Fox was given the rights to broadcast a game between the Atlanta Falcons and Detroit Lions at Wembley Stadium in London, resulting in Fox and CBS both being allocated doubleheader games on the same weekend due to the early 9:30 a.m. Eastern Time kickoff of the Falcons-Lions game, in addition to the regional games scheduled in the normal 1:00 p.m. Eastern "early" slot. In 2015 and 2016 Fox aired an NFL tripleheader (9:30 a.m., 1:00 p.m., and 4:25 p.m. ET) followed by Game 5 of 2015/2016 World Series at 8:00 p.m. ET.

=== Canadian Football League ===
The television rightsholders to the Canadian Football League (currently, TSN) have periodically aired doubleheaders and tripleheaders, usually on Saturdays and Sundays. Two Monday doubleheaders, the Labour Day Classic and the Thanksgiving Day Classic, are among the most prominent games in the schedule and occur on two national holidays. The Labour Day Classic doubleheader features prominent rivalries (Hamilton-Toronto and Edmonton-Calgary), while the Thanksgiving Day Classic are otherwise rotated (although one is hosted by the Montreal Alouettes every year).

Doubleheaders are also used to present the division semifinal and division final weeks of the CFL playoffs.

== Association football ==
=== Premier League ===
In the United Kingdom, Sky Sports airs doubleheader matches from the English Premier League under the banner "Super Sunday". These feature an early match with a kickoff scheduled at 2 p.m. and a late match with a 4:30 p.m. kickoff. Other matches may also be moved to Sunday, usually because one of the teams involved played in a UEFA Europa League fixture the preceding Thursday. This results in Sky Sports airing the early match with a kickoff scheduled at 2:15 p.m. and a late match with a 4:30 p.m. kick-off.

=== Liga MX ===
Mexican broadcaster Canal de las Estrellas usually airs a doubleheader on select Sundays during football season. The first game, usually a Deportivo Toluca F.C. or Pumas UNAM home game, begins at 12:00 p.m. Central Time (1:00 p.m. Eastern and 10:00 a.m. Pacific). The second game, typically a Club América home game, begins at 4:00 p.m. Central Time (5:00 p.m. Eastern/2:00 p.m. Pacific). Doubleheaders usually air when Club América and either Pumas UNAM or Deportivo Toluca F.C. are playing at their home stadium. In the United States, Univision began airing these doubleheaders in 2012.

=== Major League Soccer ===
Various MLS teams has scheduled doubleheaders with other hosts played in the same stadium on the same day, often with the same ticket. In the early 2000s, MLS teams scheduled doubleheaders with Women's United Soccer Association with the goal of attracting new fans to the respective teams and improve their financial outlook. Several of the largest attendances between MLS teams were set as part of doubleheaders paired with international friendlies. On August 29, 2021, at Lumen Field in Seattle, OL Reign set a National Women's Soccer League attendance record of 27,248 spectators during a match against Portland Thorns FC that was played as part of a doubleheader with the respective men's teams of the cities, Seattle Sounders FC and the Portland Timbers.

The league's broadcasters have also air doubleheaders paired with matches from other leagues and competitions. In 2013, NBC Sports aired MLS matches immediately following Premier League matches as part of a "cross-promotion" between the leagues. Fox Sports used several matches during the 2018 edition of the FIFA World Cup, including the final, as lead-ins for MLS matches played later that day.

== Australian rules football ==
=== Australian Football League ===
In Australia, Fox Footy and Seven Network airs doubleheader matches from the Australian Football League and AFL Women's under the banner "Super Sunday". These feature an early match with a kickoff scheduled at 1:30 p.m. and a late match with a 4:00 p.m. kickoff.

== National Hockey League ==
In Canada, until 2026, Hockey Night in Canada used to feature a doubleheader on CBC on Saturday nights during the National Hockey League (NHL) regular season. The first game, featuring teams based in Eastern Canada, would begin at 7 p.m. Eastern (4 p.m. Pacific Time). The second game, featuring teams based in Western Canada, aired at 10 p.m. Eastern (7 p.m. Pacific). On some Wednesday nights, Sportsnet may air a doubleheader.

In the United States, TNT also airs doubleheaders as part of its NHL coverage, usually on Tuesday and Wednesday nights, mostly in the 7 p.m. Eastern (4 p.m. Pacific) and 9:30 p.m. Eastern (6:30 p.m. Pacific) time slots. ESPN will also air doubleheaders on select nights in the same time slots, whereas sister channel ABC will air doubleheaders or tripleheaders on select Saturday afternoons, typically at 12:30 p.m. Eastern (9:30 a.m. Pacific) and 3 p.m. Eastern (Noon p.m. Pacific), with a third game usually airing in primetime at 8 p.m. Eastern (5 p.m. Pacific) on select tripleheader weeks.

== National Basketball Association ==
The NBA currently holds a quintupleheader on Christmas Day, with all games airing on ESPN and ABC. The league also frequently features doubleheaders on ESPN, NBC/Peacock, Prime Video and late in the season but less on a frequent basis, ABC. Most weeknight doubleheaders on ESPN, Peacock, and Prime Video will start with an East Coast game at 7 p.m. Eastern time (4 p.m. Pacific time), followed by a West Coast game at 9:30 p.m. Eastern (6:30 p.m. Pacific). NBC's doubleheaders follow a regional format: the East Coast game, starting at 8 p.m. Eastern (5 p.m. Pacific), is shown on NBC in the East and NBCSN in the West, and vice versa for the West Coast game, which follows at 11 p.m. Eastern (8 p.m. Pacific). ABC will carry Sunday doubleheaders that normally begin with game 1 at 1 p.m. Eastern (10 a.m. Pacific), and follow with game 2 at 3:30 p.m. Eastern (12:30 p.m. Pacific).

Occasionally, the NBA will also schedule tripleheaders and quadrupleheaders as well.

The league experimented in 2009 and 2010 with a Thanksgiving night doubleheader, but discontinued the practice after the 2011 NBA lockout and the NFL moving its primetime Thanksgiving game to NBC the next year.

== Use in the Philippines ==
Live sports on TV in the Philippines is almost exclusively aired via doubleheaders, with two games aired in succession in a single broadcast. Sports teams almost always do not represent localities, and the league itself rents venues for it to play in. Every gameday usually is a doubleheader in a single venue. Most leagues played three times a week, but with expanding number of teams, some leagues have played up to five times a week. The Philippine Basketball Association (PBA), Philippine Super Liga, the Philippines Football League, the University Athletic Association of the Philippines (UAAP; team sports) and National Collegiate Athletic Association (Philippines; team sports) all have its competitions aired under this format.

During the COVID-19 pandemic, the PBA had doubleheaders everyday of the week during its bubble conference. The UAAP basketball tournament switched to a quadruple-header format in 2022, with all eight teams playing in one day to make way for schedule adjustments.

The Metropolitan Basketball Association (MBA), where teams played in a home and away season, also schedules doubleheaders, but on separate venues. The Maharlika Pilipinas Basketball League (MPBL), while its teams represents localities, has a single team host up to three games on its home court in one day.
