= Brooke Lochland =

Australian rules footballer

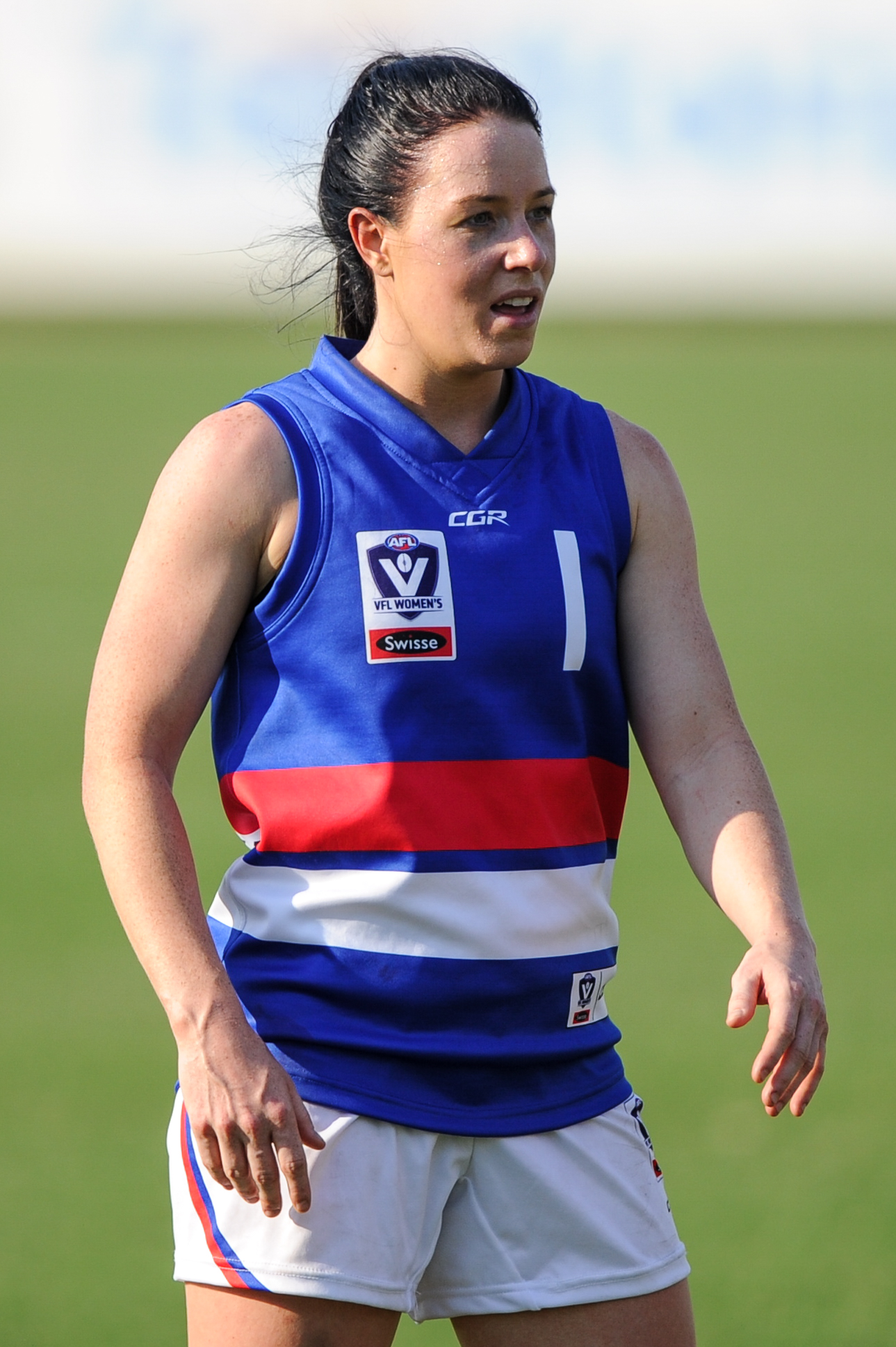
- Lochland playing for the Western Bulldogs' VFLW team in 2018

Personal information
- Full name: Brooke Lochland
- Born: 3 May 1991 (age 35)
- Original team: Melbourne University (VFLW)
- Draft: No. 53, 2016 national draft
- Debut: Round 1, 2017, Western Bulldogs vs. Fremantle, at VU Whitten Oval
- Height: 159 cm (5 ft 3 in)
- Position: Midfielder / forward

Playing career^{1}
Years	Club	Games (Goals)
2017–2022 (S6)	Western Bulldogs	35 (18)
2022 (S7)−2024	Sydney	20 (9)
Total		55 (27)
- ^{1} Playing statistics correct to the end of the 2024 season.

Career highlights
- AFL Women's premiership player: 2018; Sydney co-captain: 2022 (S7); AFL Women's leading goalkicker: 2018; AFL Women's All-Australian team: 2018; Western Bulldogs leading goalkicker: 2018; Sydney leading goalkicker: 2022 (S7)

Brooke Lochland (born 3 May 1991) is a former Australian rules footballer and former speed skater. Lochland played for the Western Bulldogs and the Sydney Swans in the AFL Women's (AFLW). In 2018, she played in the Bulldogs' AFL Women's premiership team, was the AFL Women's leading goalkicker for that season and was named in the 2018 AFL Women's All-Australian team.

== Early life ==
Lochland took up inline skating at age four and competed in world championships as a teenager. At age 16, she moved to the Netherlands to pursue a career as a long track speed skater. Despite finishing sixth in the 2011–12 World Cup mass start event, she missed out on qualifying for the Sochi Winter Olympics and retired from the sport in 2014. Upon returning to Australia later that year, Lochland switched back to football, having previously played as a junior. After two impressive seasons with Montmorency, highlighted by winning the best and fairest award for Division Two of the Victorian Women's Football League in 2015, she joined Melbourne University in the VFL Women's competition for the 2016 season.

== AFL Women's career ==
Lochland was drafted by the Western Bulldogs with their seventh selection and 53rd overall in the 2016 AFL Women's draft. She made her debut in the 32-point win against Fremantle at VU Whitten Oval in the opening round of the 2017 season. She played every match in her debut season to finish with seven games.

In 2018, Lochland kicked seven goals during the Bulldogs' 73-point round four defeat of Carlton, the most by an AFLW player in a single match. She finished the home-and-away season with twelve goals from seven matches, clinching the AFLW leading goalkicker award for the year. She would share in team success when the Western Bulldogs went on to win the premiership by defeating Brisbane in the Grand Final at Ikon Park, as well as gaining more individual recognition via selection in the All-Australian team.

Lochland sustained a leg injury in a 2019 practice match against Collingwood and subsequently underwent surgery to repair her fractured right fibula. After several weeks on the sideline, she recovered faster than expected in time to play the last three games of the 2019 season, returning for her club's one-point loss to Melbourne in round five at Docklands Stadium.

Ahead of the 2020 season, Lochland was appointed vice-captain of the Western Bulldogs. She regained consistent form throughout the 2021 season, playing every game possible and managing a career-high sixth-place finish in the club's best and fairest count (eclipsing her seventh-place finish in 2018). Lochland experienced an interrupted 2022 season 6, which included suffering a concussion before half-time of the round six encounter with Adelaide at Norwood Oval, forcing her to miss the remainder of the match and the following two games. She finished the season strongly, however, most notably in a 60-point round nine win against West Coast at Optus Stadium by gathering 15 disposals, laying five tackles and kicking three goals—her biggest haul since the record-breaking performance in 2018.

In May 2022, in a signing reported on womens.afl as a "long-awaited coup for one of the competition's new teams", Lochland joined expansion club Sydney. In August, she was named one of three co-captains for the Swans' inaugural season alongside Maddy Collier and Lauren Szigeti. She went on to play all 10 games in season 7 and become Sydney's first AFLW leading goalkicker, including booting three goals in the first quarter against Hawthorn in round 5. She finished fourth in the Swans' Club Champion award.

Lochland continued to be a regular in the Swans' forward line in 2023 despite missing two games due to a knee injury, playing 10 games as the side reached its maiden finals series. She played her 50th AFLW game in round 5 against Carlton.

Lochland also works as a coach in the Sydney Swans Academy female program.

== Statistics ==
Updated to the end 2022 season 7.

Legend
G	Goals	K	Kicks	D	Disposals	T	Tackles
B	Behinds	H	Handballs	M	Marks
#	Played in that season's premiership team	†	Led the league for the season

Season	Team	No.	Games	Totals							Averages (per game)							Votes
Season	Team	No.	Games	G	B	K	H	D	M	T	G	B	K	H	D	M	T	Votes
2017	Western Bulldogs	1	7	1	2	47	17	64	7	32	0.1	0.3	6.7	2.4	9.1	1.0	4.6	0
2018^{#}	Western Bulldogs	1	8	12^{†}	6	74	22	96	34^{†}	25	1.5^{†}	0.8	9.3	2.8	12.0	4.3	3.1	3
2019	Western Bulldogs	1	3	1	2	14	5	19	4	9	0.3	0.7	4.7	1.7	6.3	1.3	3.0	0
2020	Western Bulldogs	1	2	0	0	16	7	23	5	5	0.0	0.0	8.0	3.5	11.5	2.5	2.5	0
2021	Western Bulldogs	1	9	1	1	87	40	127	28	27	0.1	0.1	9.7	4.4	14.1	3.1	3.0	2
2022 (S6)	Western Bulldogs	1	6	3	4	38	17	55	16	11	0.5	0.7	6.3	2.8	9.2	2.7	1.8	2
2022 (S7)	Sydney	1	10	7	1	62	32	94	19	29	0.7	0.1	6.2	3.2	9.4	1.9	2.9	3
Career			45	25	16	338	140	478	113	138	0.6	0.4	7.5	3.1	10.6	2.5	3.1	10

== Honours and achievements ==
Team

- AFL Women's premiership player (Western Bulldogs): 2018
- AFL Women's minor premiership (Western Bulldogs): 2018

Individual

- Sydney co-captain: 2022 (S7)–present
- AFL Women's leading goalkicker: 2018
- AFL Women's All-Australian team: 2018
- Western Bulldogs leading goalkicker: 2018
- Sydney leading goalkicker: 2022 (S7)
