= Casey Fields =

Sports complex in Victoria, Australia

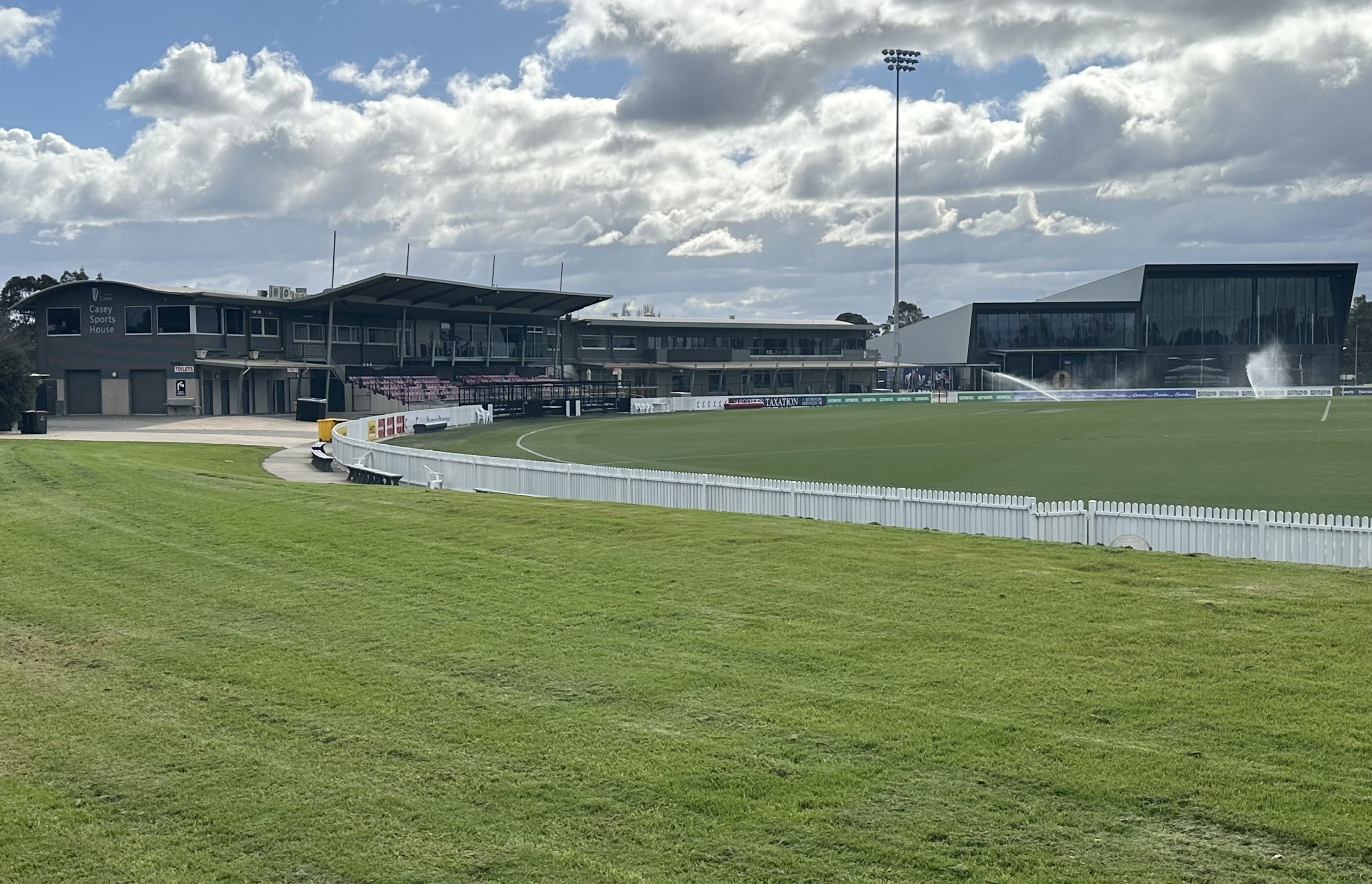
- Casey Fields Oval 1 in August 2026
- Interactive map of Casey Fields
- Address: Berwick–Cranbourne Rd; Cranbourne East, Victoria
- Coordinates: 38°7′14″S 145°18′33″E
- Owner: City of Casey
- Capacity: 9,000 (350 seated)
- Surface: Grass
- Field size: 175m × 145m

Construction
- Opened: 2006; 20 years ago

Tenants
- Casey Demons (VFL); Melbourne Football Club (AFL); Administration & Training (2009–2010); AFLW (2017–present); Melbourne City (A-League); Administration & Training (2021–present); Australia Cup (2022–present); A-League Women (2022–present)

Casey Fields is a $30 million, 70 hectare multi-sports complex in the City of Casey at Cranbourne East, a southeastern suburb of Melbourne. The complex is home to Australian rules football, cricket, netball, soccer, tennis, cycling, golf, and rugby football.

The precinct's most prominent facility is the Main Oval, an Australian rules football oval which serves as the home of the Casey Demons in the Victorian Football League. The Australian Football League's Melbourne Football Club has a training base and plays AFL Women's games at the complex. The Casey-South Melbourne Cricket Club in the Victorian Premier Cricket competition is also based at Casey Fields.

It is also the training venue for A-Leagues side Melbourne City FC, with the club hosting Australia Cup and Women's matches, as well as their NPL and Youth sides at the City Football Academy stadium. This facility is known as the City Football Academy.

== Main oval ==
The first stage of the Casey Fields development cost $4.2 million and opened on 29 April 2006. The facility consists of five grassed ovals: the main and northernmost oval was initially known as the VFL Oval, and is used exclusively for Australian rules football.

In 2005, the VFL's Springvale Football Club had been struggling financially and was hindered by the rundown condition of its home ground in Newcomen Rd, Springvale. To attempt to financially secure its future, the club and the City of Casey came to an arrangement for club to move to Casey Fields. The club moved there in 2006, changed its name to the Casey Scorpions (and in 2016 to the Casey Demons), and played its first match on the oval against Box Hill on 29 April 2006.

In 2009, the Melbourne Football Club and the City of Casey entered a 30-year partnership. The partnership which saw Melbourne establish a training centre at Casey Fields on the VFL Oval and its pavilion, which was expanded for the partnership. The two parties established a number of community-based programs together, However, The Melbourne Football Club moved its training and administrative facilitates to the AAMI park in 2010, and train at their nearby outdoor training ground at Gosch's Paddock. Melbourne also entered a reserves affiliation with the Casey Scorpions from that season. The Oval has been the primary home ground of Melbourne's AFL Women's team since 2017.

In addition to VFL matches, the VFL Oval has hosted NAB Cup pre-season regional challenge matches. The record crowd of 10,099 set in 2007 in a match between Hawthorn and Essendon. The ground also hosted many of the games played during the 2008 and 2009 AFL Under 18 Championships.

The VFL Oval has a seating capacity for only a few hundred spectators, with terraces and hills around the ground providing the rest of its capacity.

== Other facilities ==
In addition to the VFL Oval, Casey Fields has four other ovals which are used for Australian rules football in winter and cricket in summer. Ovals No. 4 and 5 and their adjoining pavilion serve as the home ground of the Casey-South Melbourne Cricket Club, which competes in the Victorian Premier Cricket competition. The South Melbourne Cricket Club moved to Casey Fields and changed its name to Casey-South Melbourne prior to the 2006–07 season. Local Cranbourne football and cricket clubs also use these four ovals.

Since redevelopments were completed in 2019, the complex also boasts four floodlit, full-sized association football (soccer) pitches and an administration building. In December 2020 Melbourne City FC announced it would move its training and administration base to the facility in 2021. Further redevelopment will take place, with an elite training tablet pitch, a two-story indoor training and administration building, and space for a potential title 4000-capacity boutique stadium, all to be added to existing facilities. The facility is known as the Etihad City Football Academy and was completed in 2022.

Casey Fields includes a criterium cycling track, which is often used by cyclists and is the location of two different rounds of the Victorian HPV Series every year.

The complex also has an athletics centre, netball courts, tennis courts, rugby fields, a golf practice cage, and fishing lake.

Since the 1990s it has been proposed that a Cranbourne East railway station be built adjacent to the complex, on a short extension from the current Cranbourne terminus of the former South Gippsland railway line. This has not yet eventuated. The only current alternative is the "Train Link" bus from Cranbourne station to New Holland Drive, and then a 15-minute walk to the complex.
