= AFL Women's =

Female Australian rules football league

- Current season, competition or edition: 2026 AFL Women's season
- Sport: Australian rules football
- Founded: 15 September 2016; 10 years ago
- First season: 2017
- CEO: Emma Moore
- No. of teams: 18
- Country: Australia
- Headquarters: Melbourne, Victoria, Australia
- Current premiers: North Melbourne (2nd premiership)
- Most premierships: Adelaide (3 premierships)
- Broadcasters: Seven Network; Fox Footy
- Streaming partners: 7plus (Australia); Kayo Sports (Australia); WatchAFL (Overseas)
- Sponsor: NAB
- Related competitions: AFL; AFLW Under 18 Championships; QAFL Women's; SANFL Women's; VFL Women's; WAFL Women's
- Website: womens.afl

AFL Women's (AFLW) is Australia's national professional Australian rules football competition for female players. The first season of the league in February and March 2017 had eight teams. The league expanded to 10 teams in the 2019 season, 14 teams in 2020 and 18 teams in 2022. The league is run by the Australian Football League (AFL) and is contested by each of the clubs from that competition. The reigning premiers are the North Melbourne Kangaroos.

The AFLW is the second most attended women's football competition in Australia (behind A-League Women) and one of the most popular women's football competitions in the world. Its average attendance in 2019 of 6,262 per game made it the second-highest of any domestic women's football competition. Its record attendance of 53,034 for the 2019 AFL Women's Grand Final was until 2020 the highest match attendance for women's sport in Australia.

Since launch, the AFLW has attracted an audience of more than 1 million attendees and 2 million viewers and has managed to maintain high interest while moving to primarily ticketed and subscription broadcasting models since the 2021 season. It consistently ranks in the top three (alongside cricket and netball) most-watched women's sporting competitions in Australia. The league receives international interest, particularly in Ireland, where it has begun to attract a significant television audience due to the ongoing recruitment of Irish Gaelic football stars. However, it was reported in mid-2023 that data revealed a significant drop in attendances for the seventh season of the women's league compared to the first season.

== History ==
=== Earlier women's participation in Australian football ===
While men playing Australian rules football is documented back to 1858, women's games have only been documented back to 1917, and the first lasting women's league was formed in 1981. Women's participation in the sport and the prevalence of women's leagues continued to grow into the 21st century.

=== Establishment ===
In 2010, the AFL commissioned a report into the state of women's football around the country. Following the report, the AFL Commission began working toward the establishment of a national women's league, choosing to establish women's teams in AFL clubs rather than form separate clubs.

The first on-field step towards the competition took place in early 2013, when the AFL announced an exhibition match to be played between women's teams representing Melbourne and Western Bulldogs in June of that year. On 15 May 2013, the first women's draft was held, establishing the playing lists for the two clubs in the forthcoming exhibition match. The match played on 29 June 2013 marked the first time two women's sides had competed under the banners of AFL clubs. A crowd of 7,518 watched the historic match, which Melbourne won by 35 points. The exhibition match became a series between the clubs, with another game played in 2014 and two played in 2015, the last of which – on 16 August 2015 – was the first women's AFL game to be broadcast on free-to-air television. It attracted an average audience of 175,000, surpassing the 114,000 average audience for the AFL men's clash of the previous day, between Adelaide and Essendon.

The success of these exhibition matches prompted the AFL to accelerate its plans for a nationwide women's competition, announcing a preferred start date of 2017. Prior to this, the league had announced only aspirational plans to have the women's competition established by 2020. The already-planned 2016 exhibition series was expanded at this time, with a total of ten matches to be played in venues across the country and featuring a range of new temporary representative teams.

In 2016, the AFL opened a process for existing clubs to tender applications to join the new competition. The 18 clubs in the men's league had until 29 April 2016 to place a bid for a licence, with 13 clubs making bids: Adelaide, Brisbane, Carlton, Collingwood, Fremantle, Geelong, Greater Western Sydney, Melbourne, North Melbourne, Richmond, St Kilda, West Coast, and Western Bulldogs. The AFL's preferred distribution of clubs was four clubs from Victoria and one each from New South Wales, Queensland, South Australia, and Western Australia.

The inaugural teams were announced on 8 June 2016. Adelaide, Brisbane, and Greater Western Sydney were the only teams to bid in their respective states and were granted licences to compete in 2017. Both Western Australian clubs made bids, with Fremantle's bid chosen ahead of the bid from West Coast. Eight Victorian clubs made bids: Melbourne, Western Bulldogs, Carlton and Collingwood were successful, with Geelong, North Melbourne, Richmond and St Kilda being unsuccessful but granted provisional licences.

Details about the branding of the league were released in the second half of 2016. On 15 September 2016, the AFL announced that the league would be named "AFL Women's" or AFLW for short, with the logo being unveiled on 19 September 2016. The logo is a stylised rendition of an Australian rules football ground goal square and goal posts, drawn from a perspective that resembles a "W". On 10 October 2016, the National Australia Bank was named as the league's naming rights sponsor.

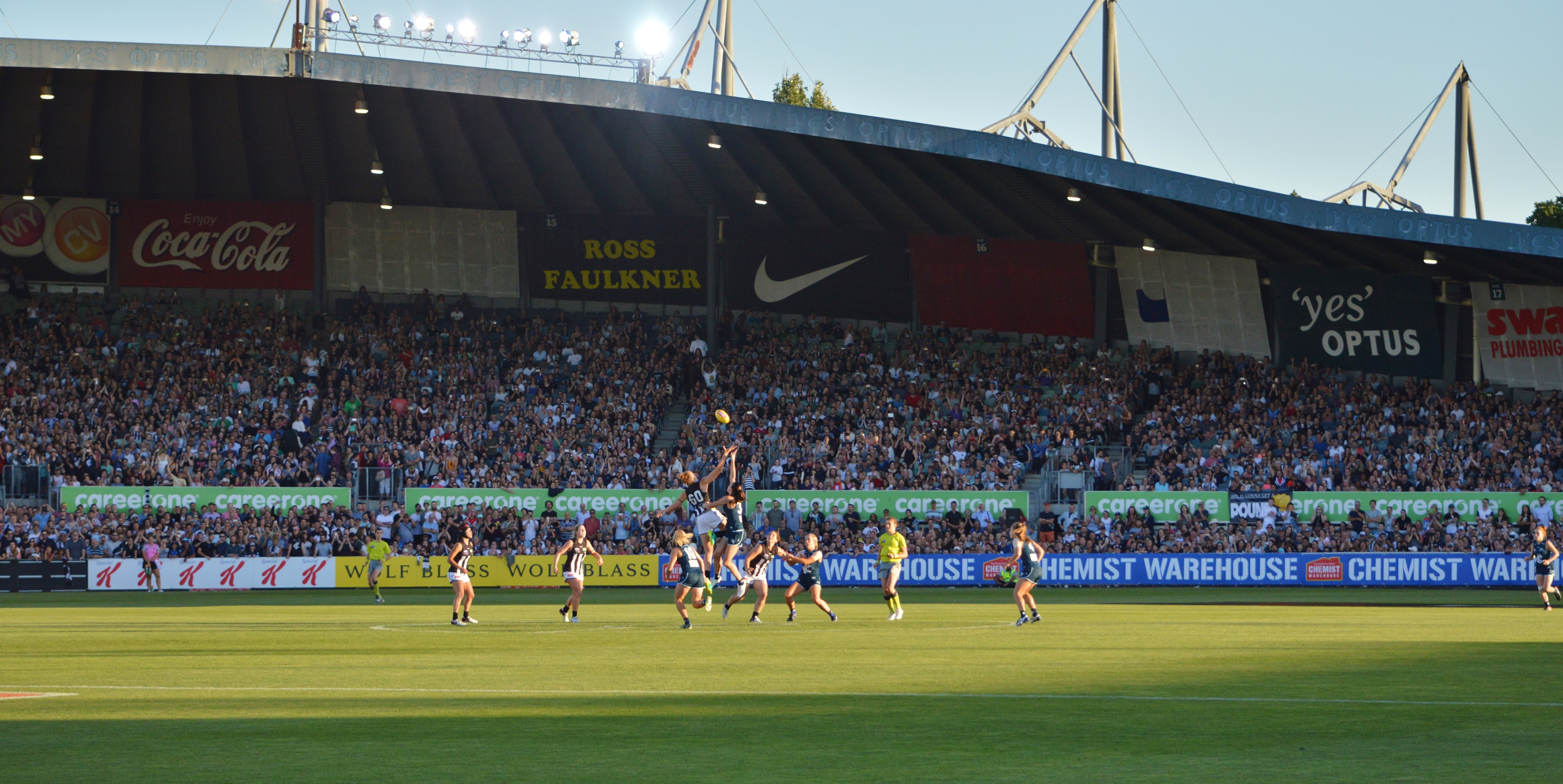
Carlton and Collingwood players contesting the first ball-up in the inaugural AFL Women's match in February 2017. The match was played before a lockout crowd of 24,568 – the highest attendance of the inaugural season.

The first premiership game was played at Ikon Park on Friday, 3 February 2017. The AFL had initially planned to host the game at Melbourne's Olympic Park Oval, with a capacity of just 7,000, but was forced to change to Ikon Park due to overwhelming interest and a need for more seating. The match was deemed a "lockout" with a capacity crowd of 24,568 in attendance, with estimates of a few thousand left outside. Gillon McLachlan, the AFL's CEO, personally apologised to those who missed out. The game was also a great success on TV, attracting a national audience of 896,000, including 593,000 metropolitan free-to-air viewers, 180,000 regional free-to-air viewers, and 123,000 on Fox Footy. The Melbourne metropolitan audience of 424,000 was on par with that of Friday-night AFL men's matches.

The inaugural season concluded with the Grand Final held on Saturday, 25 March 2017. The Adelaide Crows were crowned the league's first premiers after defeating the minor premiers, the Brisbane Lions. The scoreline read Adelaide 4.11 (35) def. Brisbane 4.5 (29).

=== Expansion (2019–present) ===
The remaining AFL clubs would join the league in the follow years, with two clubs added in the 2019 season, four in 2020, and the last four in 2022.

The 10 AFL clubs not originally participating in the competition were invited to bid for inclusion, with priority given to the five clubs that had submitted unsuccessful bids to participate in the inaugural season. The deadline to lodge submissions was 16 June 2017. The only clubs not to bid were Port Adelaide and Sydney. North Melbourne worked with AFL Tasmania to craft its bid, with the club aiming to play home matches in Melbourne, Hobart, and Launceston, and also to select half of its playing list from Tasmania.

A final decision on which clubs would be admitted to the competition was expected by the end of July 2017, but was delayed several times. On 27 September 2017, the AFL announced that Geelong and North Melbourne had been selected to enter the competition in 2019. North Melbourne retained its commitment to playing matches in Tasmania. The league then added four teams in 2020, with the AFL selecting Gold Coast, Richmond, St Kilda and West Coast to join the competition. The growth in clubs for the 2019 season was accompanied by the introduction of an American-style conference structure, which was abandoned after the 2020 season in favour of the traditional single ladder. Due to the COVID-19 pandemic, the 2020 season was curtailed and eventually cancelled without a premiership awarded.

On 12 August 2021, the final four AFL clubs (Essendon, Hawthorn, Port Adelaide and Sydney) were granted licenses, and the league's seventh season in 2022 was the first to feature all 18 AFL clubs.

North Melbourne became the first expansion team, founded after the inaugural season, to win a premiership, when the Kangaroos defeated Brisbane by 30 points in the 2024 decider, following this up with a 40 point victory in the 2025 Grand Final rematch.

Expansion of AFL Women's
Club	Entry in 2017		Entry in 2019/20			Entry in 2022 (S7)	
Club	Placed bid	Granted entry	Placed bid	Granted entry		Placed bid	Granted entry
Club	Placed bid	Granted entry	Placed bid	2019	2020	Placed bid	Granted entry
Adelaide	Yes	Yes	—N/a				
Brisbane	Yes	Yes	—N/a				
Carlton	Yes	Yes	—N/a				
Collingwood	Yes	Yes	—N/a				
Essendon	No	—N/a	Yes	No	No	Yes	Yes
Fremantle	Yes	Yes	—N/a				
Geelong	Yes	No	Yes	Yes	—N/a		
Gold Coast	No	—N/a	Yes	No	Yes	—N/a	
Greater Western Sydney	Yes	Yes	—N/a				
Hawthorn	No	—N/a	Yes	No	No	Yes	Yes
Melbourne	Yes	Yes	—N/a				
North Melbourne	Yes	No	Yes	Yes	—N/a		
Port Adelaide	No	—N/a	No	—N/a	—N/a	Yes	Yes
Richmond	Yes	No	Yes	No	Yes	—N/a	
St Kilda	Yes	No	Yes	No	Yes	—N/a	
Sydney	No	—N/a	No	—N/a	—N/a	Yes	Yes
West Coast	Yes	No	Yes	No	Yes	—N/a	
Western Bulldogs	Yes	Yes	—N/a				

== Clubs ==
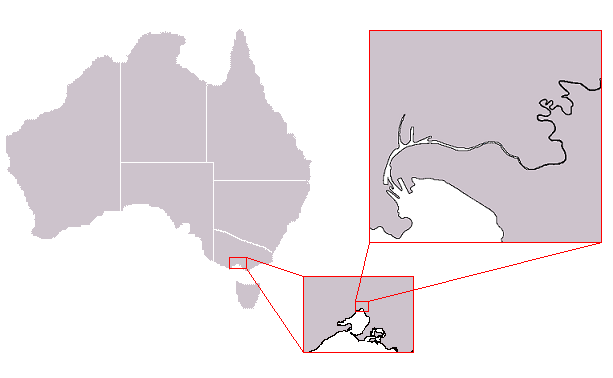

The competition's 18 teams are based across five states of Australia. Ten are based in Victoria (nine in the Melbourne metropolitan area), and New South Wales, Queensland, South Australia and Western Australia have two teams each, while a team from Tasmania will enter the AFLW at a date to be confirmed. (Note: North Melbourne currently have a formalised partnership with Tasmania, which enables the club to draft players from and play home games there.) The Australian Capital Territory and the Northern Territory are the only states or territories not to have AFLW teams.

=== Current clubs ===
Club	Colours	Moniker	State	Home venue	Exhibition games	Est.	Seasons		Premierships	
Club	Colours	Moniker	State	Home venue	Exhibition games	Est.	First	Total	Total	Most recent
Adelaide		Crows	South Australia	Norwood Oval	—	2016	2017^{+}	8	3	2022 (S6)
Brisbane		Lions	Queensland	Springfield Central Stadium	2016	2016	2017^{+}	8	2	2023
Carlton		Blues	Victoria	Princes Park	—	2016	2017^{+}	8	0	—
Collingwood		Magpies	Victoria	Victoria Park	—	2016	2017^{+}	8	0	—
Essendon		Bombers	Victoria	Windy Hill	—	2022	2022 (S7)	2	0	—
Fremantle		Dockers	Western Australia	Fremantle Oval	2016	2016	2017^{+}	8	0	—
Geelong		Cats	Victoria	Kardinia Park	—	2018	2019	6	0	—
Gold Coast		Suns	Queensland	Carrara Stadium	2016	2019	2020	5	0	—
Greater Western Sydney		Giants	New South Wales	Various (Note: Hosting home games at Blacktown ISP Oval, Henson Park and Manuka Oval during the 2023 season)	2016	2016	2017^{+}	8	0	—
Hawthorn		Hawks	Victoria	Frankston Park	—	2022	2022 (S7)	2	0	—
Melbourne		Demons	Victoria	Casey Fields	2013	2013*	2017^{+}	8	1	2022 (S7)
North Melbourne		Kangaroos	Victoria & Tasmania^	Arden Street Oval	—	2018	2019	6	2	2025
Port Adelaide		Power	South Australia	Alberton Oval	—	2022	2022 (S7)	2	0	—
Richmond		Tigers	Victoria	Punt Road Oval (Note: Hosting home games at Princes Park during the 2023 season while Punt Road Oval undergoes redevelopment)	—	2019	2020	5	0	—
St Kilda		Saints	Victoria	Moorabbin Oval	—	2019	2020	5	0	—
Sydney		Swans	New South Wales	Henson Park	2016	2022	2022 (S7)	2	0	—
West Coast		Eagles	Western Australia	Lathlain Park	2016	2019	2020	5	0	—
Western Bulldogs		Bulldogs	Victoria	Whitten Oval	2013	2013*	2017^{+}	8	1	2018
^ denotes that the club has a formalised partnership with this state or territory * denotes that the club had a foundation women's team^{+} denotes that the club was a founding member of the AFLW

=== Future clubs ===
Club	Colours	Moniker	State	Home venue	Joining league
Tasmania		Devils	Tasmania	Macquarie Point Stadium	2028

== Venues ==
Below are the venues that hosted during the 2025 season.

Venue	Matches	Location	Capacity	Host club(s)
Alberton Oval	6	Adelaide, South Australia	11,000	Port Adelaide (6)
Arden Street Oval	4	Melbourne, Victoria	4,000	North Melbourne (4)
Bond University	1	Gold Coast, Queensland	3,000	Gold Coast (1)
Blacktown ISP Oval	2	Sydney, New South Wales	10,000	Greater Western Sydney (2)
Carrara Stadium	4	Gold Coast, Queensland	22,500	Gold Coast (4)
Casey Fields	5	Melbourne, Victoria	9,000	Melbourne (5)
Cazalys Stadium	1	Cairns, Queensland	15,000	Hawthorn (1)
Coffs Harbour International Stadium	1	Coffs Harbour, New South Wales	10,000	Sydney
Eureka Stadium	1	Ballarat, Victoria	11,000	Western Bulldogs (1)
Frankston Oval	5	Melbourne, Victoria	5,000	Hawthorn (5)
Fremantle Oval	6	Perth, Western Australia	10,000	Fremantle (6)
Great Barrier Reef Arena	1	Mackay, Queensland	10,000	Gold Coast (1)
Henson Park	8	Sydney, New South Wales	30,000	Greater Western Sydney (4), Sydney (4)
Kardinia Park	6	Geelong, Victoria	40,000	Geelong (6)
Lathlain Park	4	Perth, Western Australia	6,500	West Coast (4)
Leederville Oval	2	Perth, Western Australia	15,000	West Coast (2)
Manuka Oval	2	Canberra, Australian Capital Territory	16,000	Greater Western Sydney (2)
Marrara Stadium	1	Darwin, Northern Territory	12,500	Richmond (1)
Moorabbin Oval	6	Melbourne, Victoria	8,000	St Kilda (6)
North Hobart Oval	1	Hobart, Tasmania	10,000	North Melbourne (1)
North Sydney Oval	1	Sydney, New South Wales	10,000	Sydney (1)
Norwood Oval	4	Adelaide, South Australia	10,000	Adelaide (4)
Princes Park	12	Melbourne, Victoria	12,000	Carlton (6), Melbourne (1), Richmond (5)
Springfield Central Stadium	6	Brisbane, Queensland	8,000	Brisbane (6)
University of Tasmania Stadium	1	Launceston, Tasmania	19,000	North Melbourne (1)
Unley Oval	2	Adelaide, South Australia	10,000	Adelaide (2)
Victoria Park	6	Melbourne, Victoria	10,000	Collingwood (6)
Whitten Oval	5	Melbourne, Victoria	10,000	Western Bulldogs (5)
Windy Hill	6	Melbourne, Victoria	10,000	Essendon (6)

== Players ==
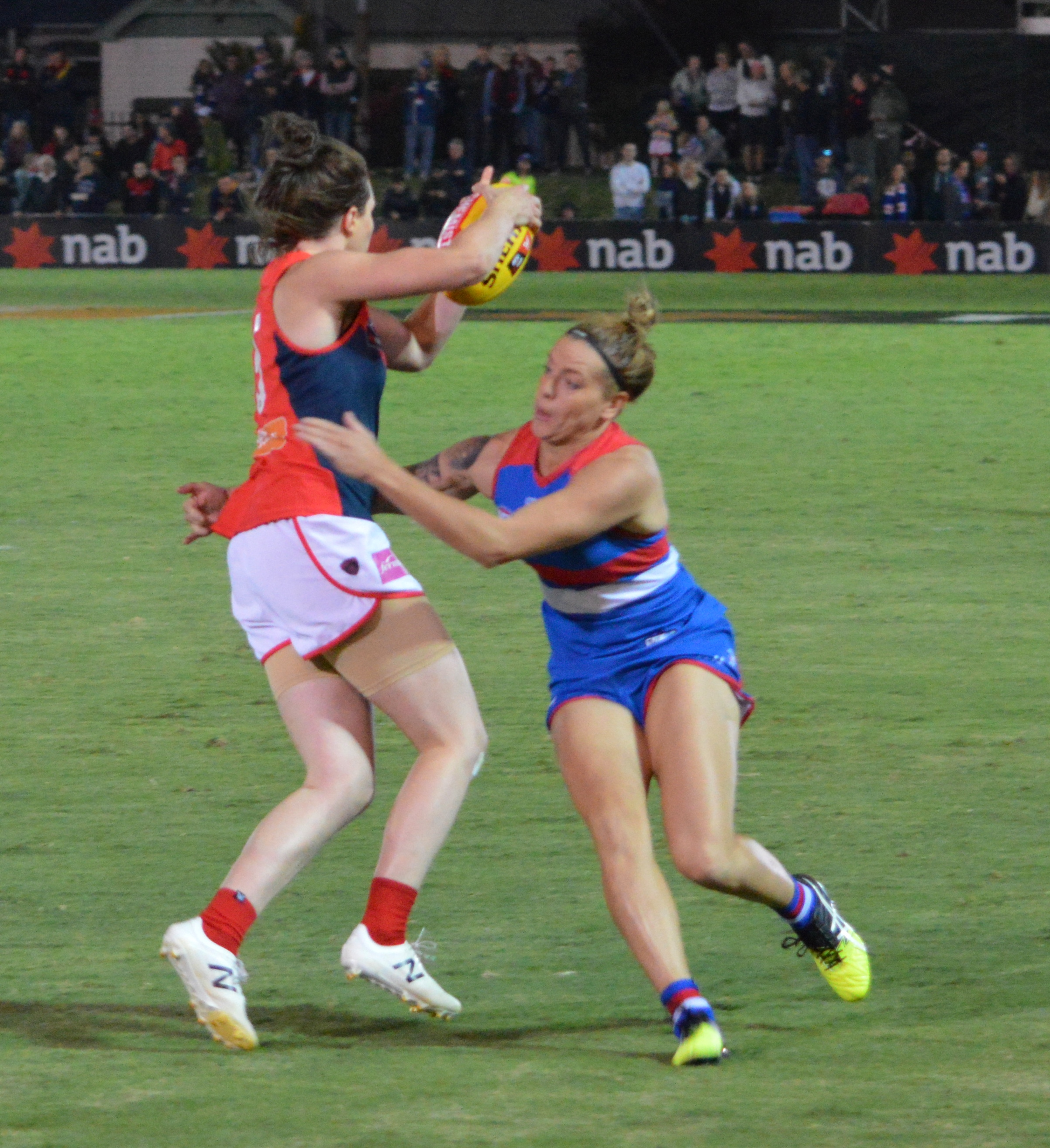
Melbourne's Elise O'Dea evaded Hannah Scott of the Western Bulldogs in Round 3, 2017.

The club's playing lists were constructed from scratch through the later stages of 2016. All participants in the 2017 season were required to be over the age of 17.

Initially, clubs were asked to nominate a list of desired players, with the AFL assigning two of these "marquee" players to each club. In addition, clubs were able to sign a number of players with existing connections to the club, or with arrangements for club-sponsored work or study. This number varied for each club, in an attempt to equitably spread talent across the teams. In addition, clubs were required to recruit two "rookies" – people with no Australian rules football experience in the previous three-year period. The majority of players were later recruited through the 2016 AFL Women's draft. The remaining list spots were filled with free-agent signings in the week following the draft. In total, clubs have 27 active listed players in addition to injury replacements signed to take the spot of long-term injury-affected players.

=== Salary ===
Player salaries are determined by collective bargaining agreement with each club's total payments being determined by a salary cap. A significant gender pay gap exists between AFL and the AFLW, with the average wage in the women's league being only 16% of that in the men's league as of 2023.

Players are split into four tiers as follows:

Tier	2017	2018	2019	2020	2021	2022	2023	2024	2025
1				$29,856	$32,077	$37,155	$71,935	$95,331	$109,760
2				$23,059	$24,775	$28,697	$55,559		$89,559
3				$19,661	$21,124	$24,468	$47,372		$76,091
4				$16,623	$17,473	$20,239	$39,184		$67,337
Total Player Payments (TPP) (per club)				$474,800	$576,240	$619,109	$717,122		
Total Player Payments (TPP) (league)	$2,300,000	$2,752,000	$4,748,000	$8,121,000	$8,722,000	$25,000,000	$32,300,000		

== Rules ==
The rules are mostly the same as those used in the AFL, with a few exceptions:

- The use of a slightly smaller ball, in line with other women's competitions.
- Quarters last 17 minutes (15 prior to 2023) instead of 20, with time-on only in the last two minutes.
- Teams have 16 players on the field at a time instead of 18, and have 60 player rotations (unlimited prior to 2023) instead of 75 total rotations.
- Throw-ins are executed 10 metres in from the boundary line, except within the 50-metre arcs, instead of on the boundary line.
- A "last touch" out-of-bounds rule applies, except within the 50-metre arcs: during 2018, this "last touch" rule applied everywhere.

== Season structure ==
=== Pre-season ===
Prior to the commencement of the home-and-away season teams are paired off to play an exhibition trial match. In 2017, these matches took place during varying weeks of January.

=== Premiership season and finals ===
For the first two seasons of competition, the home-and-away season was operated on a single table, and seven matches were played by each of the eight teams. The two highest-placed teams at the conclusion of the home-and-away season qualified for the Grand Final match, in the absence of a longer finals series.

With the addition of two extra teams in 2019, the AFL Women's home-and-away season introduced conferences, a concept not common in Australian sports. The top-two teams from the respective conferences qualified to the preliminary finals, with the first-ranked team in Conference A meeting the second-ranked team in Conference B and the opposite employed for the other preliminary final. The winners of those matches then met in the Grand Final.

The use of conferences was retained in 2020, along with the inclusion of four additional teams. The 14 teams were split into two conferences of seven, with teams playing each other team in their conference once. The top-four teams in each conference qualified for the finals series. The first round of the finals consisted of four knockout finals, with teams from opposite conferences playing against each other, first in Conference A versus fourth in Conference B, and so on. This left a final four of North Melbourne, Fremantle, Carlton, and Melbourne, with two rounds of finals to be played. At this point, the season was abandoned due to the COVID-19 pandemic, with no 2020 premier.

In 2021, the league reverted to a single 14-team ladder. Each team played 9 matches, with the top six qualifying for a three-week finals series. All finals are knockouts, with the top-two teams having a bye in the first round of the finals. Since 2022 (S7) the competition has been contested by 18 teams, and the finals series has expanded to eight teams and is played under the AFL final eight system that has been in use in the men's competition since the 2000 season.

On 21 August 2023, incoming AFL chief executive Andrew Dillon announced that the AFLW will receive equal prize money to the AFL. The prize money for AFLW players will almost double, going from $623,922 to $1.1 million to split between the top 8 teams.

==== Themed rounds ====
In 2018, the Western Bulldogs and Carlton women's teams held the first Pride game, to celebrate gender diversity, promote inclusion for LGBTIQA+ players, and to help stamp out homophobia. St Kilda and Melbourne held a Pride Match in 2020, and the first full AFLW Pride Round was held in 2021.

An Indigenous Round was established in 2021. This round acknowledges the significant contribution of Aboriginal and Torres Strait Islander women and girls to Australian football and the broader community. Each team wears a guernsey especially designed to celebrate Aboriginal and Torres Strait Islander culture, and the Dreamtime match is played between Richmond and Essendon. An AFLW Indigenous Round Honouree is announced for each season.

== Awards ==
These major individual awards and accolades are presented each season:

- Best and Fairest Trophy – to the fairest and best player in the league, voted by the umpires
- Leading Goalkicker Award – to the player who kicks the most goals during the home-and-away season
- All-Australian Team – a squad of 21 players deemed the best in their positions, voted by an AFL-appointed committee
- Rising Star Award – to the fairest and best young player under the age of 21 as at the start of the calendar year, voted by the AFL-appointed All-Australian committee
- Grand Final Best on Ground Award – the best player on the ground in the Grand Final, voted by a committee of media members

== Audience ==
=== Attendance ===
The league peaked at an average attendance of 6,828 in its inaugural season and a record 53,034 attended the 2019 Grand Final. Admission was free prior to 2022, when the AFLW introduced reserved ticketing at $10 admission per match, which was later increased. In mid-2023, data revealed a significant drop in average attendances for the seventh season compared to the first season. Taking into account the greater number of games played, total attendance was still growing, just spread over three times as many matches. The league's choice of venues has been criticised, with many of the AFL's premium venues, such as Victoria's Melbourne Cricket Ground and Docklands Stadium, not used for blockbuster AFLW matches. The league has been cited as preferring the atmosphere of fuller smaller venues rather than emptier larger venues, particularly for its television broadcasting.

The following are the most recent season attendances (record figures are bolded):

Year	Matches Played	H&A Total	Average	Highest H&A	Grand final
2025	**117**	**317,422**	2,713	8,042	12,741
2024	108	308,661	2,858	23,085	12,122
2023	99	284,122	2,870	8,722	12,616
2022 (S7)	99	265,950	2,686	20,652	7,412
2022	75	144,271	1,924	5,533	16,712
2021	68	155,908	2,293	9,552	22,934
2020	46	205,050	4,458	35,185	N/A
2019	38	251,792	6,626	18,429	**53,034**
2018	38	174,012	6,000	**41,975**	7,083
2017	29	198,020	**6,828**	24,568	9,400

=== Television ===
In its inaugural 2017 season, all matches were televised live by affiliate partners the Seven Network and Fox Footy. As part of the initial broadcast deal, the free-to-air carrier Seven broadcast one Saturday-night game per week as standard, in addition to the league's opening match and Grand Final. Pay TV network Fox Footy televised all premiership season matches, including simulcasts of the Seven-hosted matches other than the Grand Final. The two television networks covered the costs of broadcasting these matches, with no licensing fee payable to the league in exchange. Fearless: The Inside Story of the AFLW debuted on Disney+ in 2022, the docu-series followed several AFLW clubs through the course of the 2022 season. In July 2023 The Age reported that AFLW viewer numbers were down 70% from the debut season, blaming a combination of scheduling, poor quality venues and broadcast quality, and "football fatigue".

The AFLW has attracted an audience of more than 1 million attendees and 2 million viewers and has managed to maintain high interest despite moving to primarily ticketed and subscription broadcasting models from the 2021 season. It consistently ranks in the top three (alongside cricket and netball) most watched women's sporting competitions in Australia. The league receives international interest, particularly in Ireland where it has begun to attract a significant television audience due to the ongoing recruitment of Gaelic football stars.

=== Online ===
The official internet/mobile broadcast partner of the AFL is BigPond, part of Telstra. The company hosts the league website and those of each of the eight participation clubs. The AFL has retained digital broadcast rights to matches in the league's inaugural season and will stream all matches live and free on the league website and mobile app. Since 2021, Kayo Sports has streamed all AFLW matches live and on demand in Australia. Outside Australia, the inaugural season is available on Watch AFL.

== Corporate relations ==
=== Sponsorships ===
Logo used for the league since season 7

The National Australia Bank is the league's inaugural and (as of 2022) current naming-rights partner. All playing and training equipment, as well as all licensed apparel and hats for the league's clubs, are manufactured by Cotton On. Other 2017 league sponsors included Wolf Blass, Chemist Warehouse, and Kellogg's. The official ball supplier is Sherrin.

=== Merchandising ===
Official match-day attire, together with other club merchandise, is sold through the AFL's stores and website, as well through the clubs and some retailers.

== Women's exhibition games (2013–2016) ==
Prior to the creation of the league, the AFL ran four years of exhibition matches between sides representing Melbourne and Western Bulldogs. In 2016, the series was expanded to multiple teams from around the country.

	2013 exhibition game
Sunday, 30 June	Melbourne 8.5 (53)	def.	Western Bulldogs 3.3 (21)	MCG (crowd: 7,500)	Match report
Melbourne received the Hampson–Hardeman Cup, named in honour of women's football pioneers Barb Hampson and Lisa Hardeman, who developed the first women's championships in 1992.

	2014 exhibition game
Sunday, 29 June	Western Bulldogs 4.2 (26)	def. by	Melbourne 10.12 (72)	Etihad Stadium (crowd: 24,953 (D/H))	Match report
Melbourne retained the Hampson–Hardeman Cup.

	2015 exhibition series
Sunday, 24 May	Melbourne 4.13 (37)	def.	Western Bulldogs 4.5 (29)	MCG (crowd: 29,381 (D/H))	Match report
Sunday, 16 August	Western Bulldogs 5.6 (36)	def. by	Melbourne 6.4 (40)	Etihad Stadium (crowd: 27,805 (D/H))	Match report
Melbourne retained the Hampson–Hardeman Cup.; Both matches were aired live on the Seven Network, as part of their AFL coverage.

	2016 exhibition series
Sunday, 2 March	Melbourne 3.3 (21)	def. by	Western Bulldogs 6.5 (41)	Highgate Recreational Reserve	Match report
Saturday, 2 April	SANFL Blue 5.4 (34)	def.	SANFL Red 5.2 (32)	Adelaide Oval (crowd: 51,585 (D/H))	Match report
Saturday, 9 April	Sydney 9.8 (62)	def.	Greater Western Sydney 5.3 (33)	SCG (crowd: 37,045 (D/H))	Match report
Saturday, 9 April	West Coast 13.10 (88)	def.	Fremantle 3.5 (23)	Domain Stadium (crowd: 40,555 (D/H))	Match report
Sunday, 10 April	Northern Territory 13.11 (89)	def.	Tasmania 7.11 (53)	Peanut Reserve	Match report
Saturday, 16 April	Brisbane 5.8 (38)	def.	Gold Coast 3.6 (24)	Gabba (crowd: 20,041 (D/H))	Match report
Sunday, 22 May	Melbourne 14.7 (91)	def.	Brisbane 3.2 (20)	MCG (crowd: 26,892 (D/H))	Match report
Sunday, 5 June	Western Bulldogs 8.5 (53)	def.	Western Australia 5.10 (40)	Etihad Stadium (crowd: 28,769 (D/H))	Match report
Sunday, 5 June	South Australia 4.3 (27)	def.	NSW/ACT 3.7 (25)	Adelaide Oval (crowd: 40,896 (D/H))	Match report
Saturday, 3 September	Western Bulldogs 14.6 (90)	def.	Melbourne 7.9 (51)	Whitten Oval (crowd: 6,365)	Match report
Selected matches aired live on either on the Seven Network or Fox Footy, as part of their AFL coverage.; This series saw the introduction of a women's Sydney Derby, Western Derby, and QClash: these would take place again in 2022 and 2019 in the AFLW.; The SANFL Blue v SANFL Red match was originally meant to be a women's Showdown, but Port Adelaide's women's team went into recess at the end of their 2016 season. After plans for an Adelaide v Rest of South Australia match fell through, Adelaide, Port Adelaide and the AFL mutually agreed to arrange this fixture, which also served as a selection trial for the inaugural Adelaide AFLW squad: the first women's Showdown would take place in 2022.; Only the 3 September clash between Melbourne and the Western Bulldogs, which was played in the week's break before the 2016 AFL finals series, was contested for the Hampson–Hardeman Cup. The match was televised on Channel 7, attracting a peak of 1.05 million viewers nationally, with 387,000 viewers in Melbourne; it was the highest-rated match broadcast in Melbourne during the 2016 home and away season.

== Premiers and awards ==
=== Premiers ===
Club	Seasons in competition	Premierships	Runners up	Premiership seasons	Runner-up seasons
Adelaide	2017–present	3	1	2017, 2019, 2022 (S6)	2021
Brisbane	2017–present	2	5	2021, 2023	2017, 2018, 2022 (S7), 2024, 2025
Western Bulldogs	2017–present	1	0	2018	
Melbourne	2017–present	1	1	2022 (S7)	2022 (S6)
North Melbourne	2019–present	2	1	2024, 2025	2023
Carlton	2017–present	0	1		2019
Collingwood	2017–present	0	0		
Fremantle	2017–present	0	0		
Greater Western Sydney	2017–present	0	0		
Geelong	2019–present	0	0		
Richmond	2020–present	0	0		
St Kilda	2020–present	0	0		
Gold Coast	2020–present	0	0		
West Coast	2020–present	0	0		
Essendon	2022 (S7)–present	0	0		
Hawthorn	2022 (S7)–present	0	0		
Port Adelaide	2022 (S7)–present	0	0		
Sydney Swans	2022 (S7)–present	0	0		

=== AFLW best and fairest ===
The best and fairest award determined in the same way as the Brownlow Medal for men, with umpires awarding three, two, and one votes to the best three players in each game, and suspended players are ineligible.

Season	Player	Club
2017	Erin Phillips	Adelaide
2018	Emma Kearney	Western Bulldogs
2019	Erin Phillips	Adelaide
2020	Maddy Prespakis	Carlton
2021	Brianna Davey	Collingwood
2021	Kiara Bowers	Fremantle
2022 (S6)	Emily Bates	Brisbane
2022 (S7)	Ally Anderson	Brisbane
2023	Monique Conti	Richmond
2024	Ebony Marinoff	Adelaide
2025	Ash Riddell	North Melbourne

=== AFL Players' Association Most Valuable Player ===
The MVP award is voted on by the players' peers, in a similar method to the Leigh Matthews Trophy for men.

Season	Player	Club
2017	Erin Phillips	Adelaide
2018	Courtney Gum	GWS Giants
2019	Erin Phillips	Adelaide
2020	Jasmine Garner	North Melbourne
2021	Brianna Davey	Collingwood
2022 (S6)	Emily Bates	Brisbane
2022 (S7)	Monique Conti	Richmond
2023	Jasmine Garner	North Melbourne
2024	Ebony Marinoff	Adelaide
2025	Jasmine Garner	North Melbourne

=== AFL Coaches' Association Champion Player ===
Each week, the senior coach of each club gives five votes to the player they consider to be best on ground in the game in which their team plays, four to the second-best, and so on to one for the fifth-best.

Season	Player	Club
2017	Not awarded	
2018	Chelsea Randall	Adelaide
2018	Emma Kearney	Western Bulldogs
2019	Erin Phillips	Adelaide
2020	Jasmine Garner	North Melbourne
2021	Kiara Bowers	Fremantle
2022 (S6)	Emily Bates	Brisbane
2022 (S7)	Jasmine Garner	North Melbourne
2023	Jasmine Garner	North Melbourne
2024	Ebony Marinoff	Adelaide
2025	Ash Riddell	North Melbourne

=== Leading goalkicker ===
Season	Player	Club	Goals
2017	Darcy Vescio	Carlton	14
2018	Brooke Lochland	Western Bulldogs	12
2019	Stevie-Lee Thompson	Adelaide	13
2020	Caitlin Greiser	St Kilda	10
2021	Darcy Vescio (2)	Carlton	16
2022 (S6)	Ashleigh Woodland	Adelaide	19
2022 (S7)	Jesse Wardlaw	Brisbane	22
2023	Kate Hore	Melbourne	20
2023	Eden Zanker	Melbourne	20
2024	Aishling Moloney	Geelong	21
2024	Taylor Smith	Brisbane	21
2025	Indy Tahau	Port Adelaide	25

== See also ==
- List of women's Australian rules football leagues
