= 2007 AFL Women's National Championships =

2007 AFL Women's National Championships
Host	Australian Capital Territory
States	9
Winners	Victoria-Senior
Runner-up	Western Australia
3rd Place	Queensland
Final
78 - 27

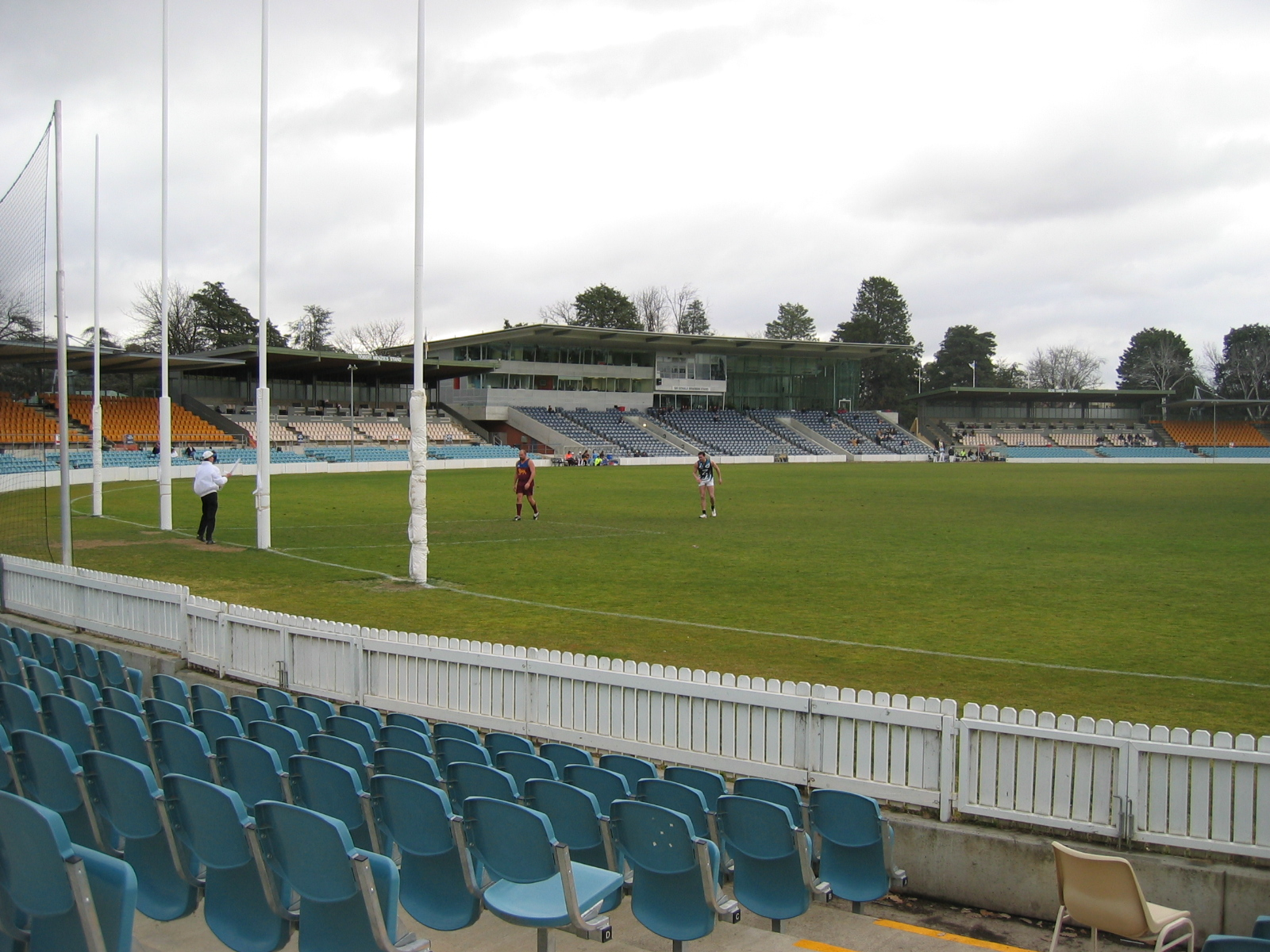
The 2007 AFL Women's National Championships took place at Manuka Oval.

The 2007 AFL Women's National Championships took place in Canberra, Australian Capital Territory, Australia. The tournament began on 11 June and ended on 16 July 2006. The 2006 tournament was the 16th Championship, the previous one being held in Sydney in 2006. The Senior-vics of Victoria won the 2006 Championship, defeating Western Australia in the final. It was Victoria's 15th successive title.

== Ladder ==
1. Victoria-Senior
2. Western Australia
3. Queensland
4. Victoria-U19
5. Australian Capital Territory
6. Northern Territory
7. South Australia
8. New South Wales
9. Australian Defence Force

== All-Australian Team 2007 ==
- VIC Seniors: Michelle Dench (Melb Uni), Elizabeth Skinner (Melb Uni) Shannon McFerran (St Albans), Meg Hutchins (Deakin), Lauren Tesoriero (Yarra Valley), Janine Milne (Darebin).
- VIC U19's: Daisy Pearce (Darebin), Karen Paxman (Hadfield), Penny Cula-Reid (St Kilda), Moana Hope (Darebin), Lauren Arnell (Darebin).
- ACT: Kirsten Ireland (Riverina)
- ADF: Emma Hender (Eastlake)
- NSW: Talei Owen (UNSW/Easts)
- NT: Michaeline Brown (St Mary's)
- QLD: Katherine Pender (Centrals); Aasta O'Connor (Logan); Joanne Butland (North Cairns)
- SA: Michele Reid (Greenacres)
- WA: Nikki Harwood (Melville Dockers), Krystle Rivers (Coastal Titans), Louise Knitter (The Hawks), Jodie White (Coastal Titans).
