= 2005 AFL Women's National Championships =

2005 AFL Women's National Championships
| Host | Victoria |
| States | 9 |
| Winners | Victoria-U19 |
| Runner-up | Victoria-Senior |
| 3rd Place | Western Australia |
Final
130–18

The 2005 AFL Women's National Championships took place in Melbourne, Victoria, Australia. The tournament began on 19 June and ended on 24 June 2006. The 2005 tournament was the 14th Championship, the previous one being held in Adelaide in 2004. The U19-vics of Victoria won the 2005 Championship, defeating Senior-vics of Victoria in the final. It was Victoria U19's 1st title.

== Ladder ==
1. Victoria-U19
2. Victoria-Senior
3. Western Australia
4. Queensland
5. Northern Territory
6. Australian Capital Territory
7. South Australia
8. New South Wales
9. Australian Defence Force

== All-Australian Team ==
VIC U19: Karen Paxman, Moana Hope, Penny Cula-Reid, Daisy Pearce

ACT: Mel Backhouse, Alana Lowes, Allison Smith

NT: Lisa Roberts, Natalie Wood, Kate Burke

VIC: Debbie Lee, Shannon McFerran, Lilian Keung, Michelle Dench, Meg Hutchins, Liz Skinner

SA: Mary Ryan

WA: Louise Knitter

QLD: Katherine Pender, Joanne Butland

NSW: Talei Owen, Stephanie Foster

Coach: Ricky Dolliver
