= 2006 AFL Women's National Championships =

2006 AFL Women's National Championships
Host	New South Wales
States	9
Winners	Victoria-Senior
Runner-up	Western Australia
3rd Place	Queensland
Final
130–18

The 2006 AFL Women's National Championships took place in Sydney, New South Wales, Australia. The tournament began on 19 June and ended on 24 June 2006. The 2006 tournament was the 15th Championship, the previous one being held in Melbourne in 2005. The Senior-vics of Victoria won the 2006 Championship, defeating Western Australia in the final. It was Victoria's 14th successive title.

== Ladder ==
1. Victoria-Senior
2. Western Australia
3. Queensland
4. Victoria-U19
5. Northern Territory
6. Australian Capital Territory
7. South Australia
8. New South Wales
9. Australian Defence Force

== All-Australian Team ==
VIC Seniors: Michelle Dench (Melb Uni), Shannon McFerran (St Albans), Meg Hutchins (Deakin), Lauren Tesoriero (Yarra Valley), Janine Milne (Darebin).

VIC U19's: Daisy Pearce (Darebin), Karen Paxman (Hadfield), Penny Cula-Reid (St Kilda), Moana Hope (Darebin), Lauren Arnell (Darebin).

ACT: Kirsten Ireland (Riverina)

ADF: Emma Hender (Eastlake)

NSW: Talei Owen (UNSW/Easts)

NT: Michaeline Brown (St Mary's)

QLD: Katherine Pender (Centrals), Aastra O'Connor (Logan), Joanne Butland (North Cairns)

SA: Michele Reid (Greenacres)

WA: Nikki Harwood (Melville Dockers), Krystle Rivers (Coastal Titans), Louise Knitter (The Hawks), Jodie White (Coastal Titans).
