= 2006 Ladies' International Rules Series =

Ireland	Australia
173	33
- Ireland win series 173–33 on aggregate

First test
Ireland	Australia
134	15
- Date: 31 October 2006
- Venue: Breffni Park, Cavan
- Referee: Eugene O'Hare; Cony Vardouniotis

Second test
Australia	Ireland
18	39
- Date: 4 November 2006
- Venue: Parnell Park, Dublin
- Referee: Declan Staunton

The 2006 Ladies' International Rules Series was the first and, as of 2019, the only ladies' International rules football series played between Ireland and Australia. The series was played at the same time as the men's 2006 International Rules Series. Ireland won the series, claiming the first test at Breffni Park by 134–15 and the second test at Parnell Park by 39–18. The series was broadcast live by TG4 and Setanta Sports.

== Background ==
=== TG4 anniversary ===
In 2006 TG4 was celebrating its 10th anniversary and asked the Ladies' Gaelic Football Association for suggestions to help mark the occasion. The LGFA subsequently approached AFL Victoria's female development manager, Nicole Graves, about the possibility of a ladies' international rules series.

=== Rules ===
In March 2006 officials from the Ladies' Gaelic Football Association and Women's Football Australia met in Singapore to agree a set of rules for the test series. The LGFA were in Singapore for their 2006 All Stars tour. There were a number of differences from the men's game. Fewer steps were allowed than in the men's game. Players were not allowed to call a mark in the middle of the field. Instead, a mark was only allowed inside both 45 metre lines. This was intended to see more flow in the game. The scoring system and use of the round ball remained the same as in the men's game. The Australian-style tackle was not allowed in the women's series.

== Series ==
=== First test ===
31 October 2006	Ireland	134;15	Australia	Breffni Park, Cavan
16:00	6.26.16; Mary Sheridan (1-4-0; 18); Geraldine Doherty (1-3-0; 15); Cora Staunton (1-2-3; 15); Sarah O'Connor (0-3-4; 13); Dympna O'Brien (1-2-0; 12); Brianne Leahy (1-1-0; 9); Mairead Morrissey (1-1-0; 9); Michaela Downey (0-2-1; 7); Patricia Gleeson (0-1-3; 6); Lorraine Muckian (0-2-0; 6); Sinéad Aherne (0-1-1; 4); Bronagh Sheridan (0-1-1; 4); Aoibheann Daly (0-1-0; 3); Bronagh O'Donnell (0-1-0; 3); Caroline O'Hanlon (0-1-0; 3); Alma O'Donnell (0-0-1; 1); A.M. McDonough (0-0-1; 1); Angela Walsh (0-0-1; 1)		1.2.3; K. Zacharopoulos (1-0-1; 7); Michelle Dench (0-1-0; 3); Shelly Matcham (0-1-0; 3); Shannon McFerran (0-0-1; 1); Talei Owen (0-0-1; 1)	Referee: Eugene O'Hare; Cony Vardouniotis

=== Second test ===
4 November 2006	Ireland	39;18	Australia	Parnell Park, Dublin
19:15	3.5.6		0.4.6	Referee: Declan Staunton

== Squads ==
Ireland: Manager: Jarlath Burns (Armagh) First test starting XV Clíodhna O'Connor (Dublin); Rena Buckley (Cork); Angela Walsh (Cork); Caoimhe Marley (Armagh); Aoibheann Daly (Galway); Norita Kelly (Cork); Patricia Fogarty (Laois); Patricia Gleeson (Galway); Mary O'Donnell (Waterford); Sarah O'Connor (Kerry) (c); Bronagh Sheridan (Cavan); Brianna Leahy (Kildare); Geraldine Doherty (Meath); Mairead Morrissey (Tipperary); Cora Staunton (Mayo) Interchange players: Sinéad Aherne (Dublin); Micheala Downey (Down); Christina Heffernan (Mayo); Anne Marie McDonagh (Galway); Lorraine Muckian (Laois); Alma O'Donnell (Armagh); Dympna O'Brien (Limerick); Bronagh O'Donnell (Armagh); Caroline O'Hanlon (Armagh); Mary Sheridan (Meath) Squad players: Juliet Murphy (Cork); Una Carroll (Galway); Grainne Ni Flathartha (Kerry); Sinéad Dooley (Meath); Jackie Shields (Meath)	Australia: Coach: Nicole Graves First test starting XV Joanne Butland (Queensland); Jane Clifton (Victoria); Kerryn Stephens (Victoria); Lauren Tesoriero (Victoria); Shannon McFerran (Victoria); Sarah Hammond (Victoria); Pia Kilburn (Western Australia GAA); Shelley Matcham (Western Australia); Belinda Blay (Victoria); Katherine Pender (Queensland); Meg Hutchins (Victoria); Lydia Padgett (Western Australia GAA); Talei Owen (Sydney); Julia Boyle (Victoria GAA); Angela Doyle (Western Australia GAA) Interchange players: Kathy Zacharopoulos (Victoria); Anna Haynes (Western Australia); Moana Hope (Victoria); Emma Hender (ACT); Renae Campbell (Western Australia GAA); Anna McIlroy (Victoria); Janine Milne (Victoria); Daisy Pearce (Victoria); Michelle Dench (Victoria); Penny Cula-Reid (Victoria)
