= Australia women's national international rules football team =

Australia
- Emblem
- Union: Women's Football Australia
- Head coach: Nicole Graves (2006)
First colours

First international
- (Republic of Ireland) Ireland 134–15 Australia (2006, 1st Test)

Biggest defeat
- (Republic of Ireland) Ireland 134–15 Australia (2006, 1st Test)

The Australia women's international rules football team was organised by Women's Football Australia and represented Australia in the 2006 Ladies' International Rules Series against Ireland. As of 2019, this is the only series the team has played. Ireland won the series, winning the first test at Breffni Park by 134–15 and the second test at Parnell Park by 39–18.

== 2006 Series ==
=== First test ===
31 October 2006	Ireland	134;15	Australia	Breffni Park, Cavan
16:00	6.26.16; Mary Sheridan (1-4-0; 18); Geraldine Doherty (1-3-0; 15); Cora Staunton (1-2-3; 15); Sarah O'Connor (0-3-4; 13); Dympna O'Brien (1-2-0; 12); Brianne Leahy (1-1-0; 9); Mairead Morrissey (1-1-0; 9); Michaela Downey (0-2-1; 7); Patricia Gleeson (0-1-3; 6); Lorraine Muckian (0-2-0; 6); Sinéad Aherne (0-1-1; 4); Bronagh Sheridan (0-1-1; 4); Aoibheann Daly (0-1-0; 3); Bronagh O'Donnell (0-1-0; 3); Caroline O'Hanlon (0-1-0; 3); Alma O'Donnell (0-0-1; 1); A.M. McDonough (0-0-1; 1); Angela Walsh (0-0-1; 1)		1.2.3; K. Zacharopoulos (1-0-1; 7); Michelle Dench (0-1-0; 3); Shelly Matcham (0-1-0; 3); Shannon McFerran (0-0-1; 1); Talei Owen (0-0-1; 1)	Referee: Eugene O'Hare; Cony Vardouniotis

=== Second test ===
4 November 2006	Ireland	39;18	Australia	Parnell Park, Dublin
19:15	3.5.6		0.4.6	Referee: Declan Staunton

== 2006 squad ==
The All-Australian team from the 2006 AFL Women's National Championships were all invited to trials for the squad. In addition the top twenty Ladies' Gaelic football players were also invited. The final squad consisted mostly of Victorian Women's Football League players.

Coach
Nicole Graves
First test starting XV
Joanne Butland (Queensland); Jane Clifton (Victoria), Kerryn Stephens (Victoria), Lauren Tesoriero (Victoria), Shannon McFerran (Victoria), Sarah Hammond (Victoria); Pia Kilburn (Western Australia GAA), Shelley Matcham (Western Australia) ^{(Note 1)}, Belinda Blay (Victoria); Katherine Pender (Queensland), Meg Hutchins (Victoria), Lydia Padgett (Western Australia GAA), Talei Owen (Sydney), Julia Boyle (VWFL/Victoria GAA), Angela Doyle (Western Australia GAA)
Interchange players
Kathy Zacharopoulos (Victoria), Anna Haynes (Western Australia) ^{(Note 2)}, Moana Hope (Victoria), Emma Hender (ACT), Renae Campbell (Western Australia GAA), Anna McIlroy (Victoria), Janine Milne (Victoria), Daisy Pearce (Victoria), Michelle Dench (Victoria), Penny Cula-Reid (Victoria)

Notes

- ^1 Shelley Matcham was a member of the Australia women's touch football national team
- ^2 Anna Haynes was a member of the Australia ultimate national team
