= Women's Australian rules football =

Women's Australian Rules football
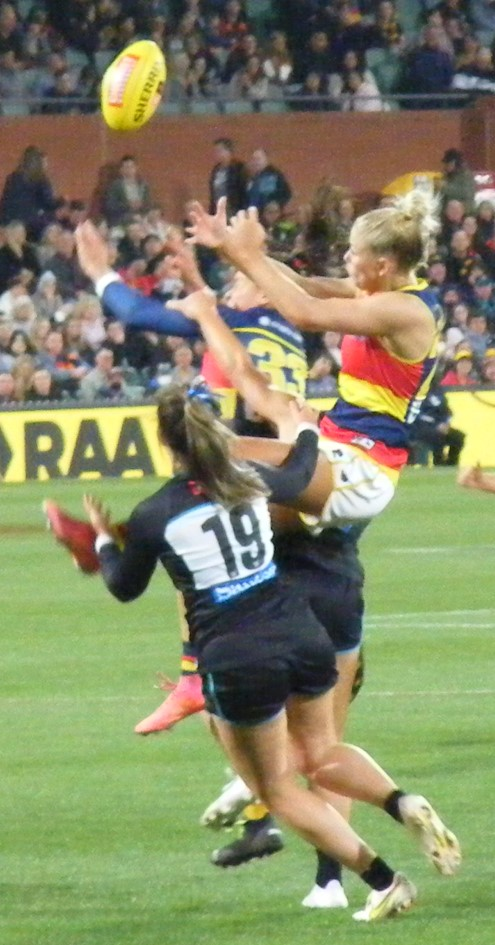
- Marking contest during the 2022 AFL Women's season Showdown between Adelaide and Port Adelaide at the Adelaide Oval
- Highest governing body: AFL Commission
- First played: 1917; Perth, Western Australia
- Registered players: 530,166 (2021)

Characteristics
- Team members: 16 per side + 5 interchange (differs to men's 18 per side + 4 interchange)
- Type: Team sport; Ball sport; Contact sport
- Equipment: Modified ball
- Venue: Australian rules football playing field (Australian rules ground, cricket pitch or similar sized field)

Women's Australian rules football (in areas where it is popular, known simply as women's football, women's footy or women's AFL) is the female-only form of Australian rules football, generally with some modification to the laws of the game. It is played by more than half a million women worldwide and with 119,447 Australian adult and 66,998 youth female participants in 2023 is the second most played code among women and girls in Australia behind soccer.

The first Australian rules football matches involving women were organised late in the 19th century, but for several decades it occurred mostly in the form of scratch matches, charity matches and one-off exhibition games. The first all-female matches began early in the 20th century, and regular competition first emerged after World War II. State-based leagues emerged between the 1980s and 2000s: the first was the Victorian Women's Football League (VWFL) formed in Melbourne in 1981, with others including the West Australian Women's Football League (WAWFL) formed in Perth in 1988 and the South Australian Women's Football League (SAWFL) formed in Adelaide in 1991. The AFL Women's National Championships were inaugurated in 1992.

In 2010 the Australian Football League (AFL) assumed control of the sport with the intention of professionalising it and began restructuring competitions around the country to support an Australian national league, AFL Women's (AFLW), that commenced its inaugural season in 2017. By 2022 all 18 AFL clubs had begun fielding women's teams. The AFLW attracts a large audience of more than one million attendees and over two million viewers, and has managed to maintain its high levels of interest despite moving to primarily ticketed and subscription broadcasting models in 2021. The AFLW competition is one of the most popular women's football competitions in the world with an average attendance in 2019 of 6,262 a game. The record attendance is 53,034 which was set at the 2019 AFL Women's Grand Final which, prior to the 2020 ICC Women's T20 World Cup, held the record for the most attended fixture in Australian women's sport.

Women's Australian rules has also grown rapidly outside of Australia since the 2000s. The Women's International Cup has been run since 2011. Players to represent their country and be recruited at AFLW level include Laura Duryea, Clara Fitzpatrick (Ireland) and Kendra Heil (Canada).

== History ==
The game's governing body, the AFL Commission, has been criticised for its lack of acknowledgement of the history of women's football, taking credit only for the virtually overnight "revolution" of the AFLW while making only passing reference to its origins and development.

While the Australian Football League has, in fact, played some role in the development of women's football in Australia, especially from the 2010s, it operated for 120 years without any official female teams, and was one of the last sporting competitions in the country to affiliate with a women's league. Overall public support for women's football in the league's home of Melbourne has also lagged behind the rest of the country to an extent.

Codified in 1859, Australian football had been played by men for almost half a century before the first all-women's football matches were played: exceptions to this included charity matches, such as patriotic fundraisers, which occasionally featured women players. Despite this, women have nonetheless followed the Australian game passionately since the mid-19th century, accounting for approximately 50% of spectators at matches, a uniquely high figure among football codes. As early as 1862 women publicly questioned why they would not be able to play.

Women's soccer became popular in the 1920s, and while documented mentions of football matches are often difficult to differentiate as to whether they were played under Australian rules, there is significant evidence of a continuity in competition from the end of World War I spanning several Australian states.

Both world wars were a great liberator for women; as the men fought in the war, women were often called to perform many tasks typically done by men, including spectator sports.

=== Earliest women's teams and matches ===
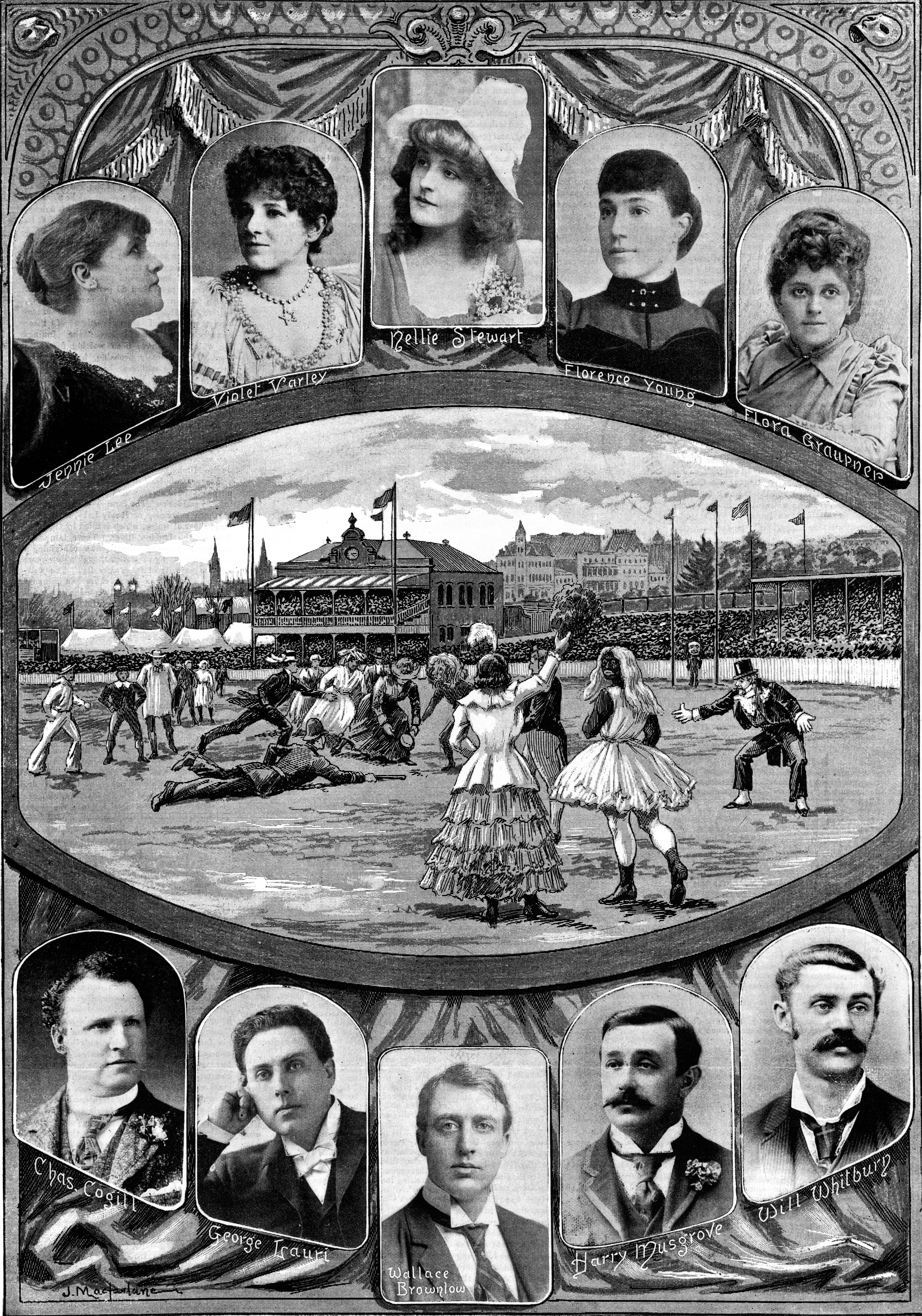
Nellie Stewart, Florence Maude Young, Jennie Lee and other female celebrities participated in a charity football match, 1894, East Melbourne Cricket Ground

In August 1880, a group gathered at Sandhurst (Bendigo) in Victoria responding to a postcard from signed "Lover of Football" to form an all-ladies football club. The idea was considered a novelty at the time, and did not proceed, though generated some attention across regional Victoria. In 1886, a local paper reported that a group of women in Williamstown were seen playing kick-to-kick. In the same year a call for a ladies football club affiliated with the North Williamstown Football Club suggesting a hybrid match against a women's lacrosse club was made in the Williamstown Chronicle.

Costume football matches were popular from the late 1870s as a form of outdoor fancy dress theatre amusement mixing opera, comedy and pantomime. While early events were poorly documented, accounts from the time were over the top and gaudy affairs. However such matches provided a gateway for female participation and over time these there were more and more documented accounts of the inclusion of female characters. In 1887 one of the earliest accounts of numerous "young ladies" participating was held in Ballarat, at the Eastern Oval in front of a huge crowd of 6,000.

In 1892, a Bendigo woman was charged with nuisance for kicking a football in the street.

In 1894, a high profile costume match was played to raise funds for the Australian Dramatic and Musical Association which featured one of the earliest all-female teams which included Nellie Stewart, Florence Maude Young, Jennie Lee, Violet Varley and Flora Graupner. Played at the East Melbourne Cricket Ground the match attracted one of the largest crowds ever seen to the ground and was declared a draw and the media lauded the performance of the female team: "the ladies, in fact, carried all before them". A repeat female vs male match was played at the Theatrical Carnival at the Royal Exhibition Building in 1895.

=== World War I: Shopgirl competitions and first all-women's matches ===
Women's role on the Home front during World War I saw the organisation of the earliest recorded all-women's matches.

Records exist of a football side in Perth, Western Australia made up of department store staff playing as Foy & Gibson's as early as 1915. Some of the first organised matches were played on Perth Oval, including one on 14 October 1917.

In Victoria the Federal Khaki Clothing Factory "Khaki girls" team (playing in khaki and white) travelled to Ballarat to play the Ballarat Eleanor Lucas's lingerie factory "Lucas girls" team (playing in pink and white and coached by Charlie Clymo) at City Oval in Ballarat, Victoria in August which was, according to reports, a highly physical contest in front of a "huge crowd" and the even was met with substantial fanfare. The match funded the Ballarat Arch of Victory. The Lucas girls won the match 3 goals 6 (24) to the Khakis 1 goal 2 (8) in front of 7,000 people, then the largest football crowd in Ballarat history. A photograph of the Lucas Girls Football team appears in the Ballarat Star in December 1918.

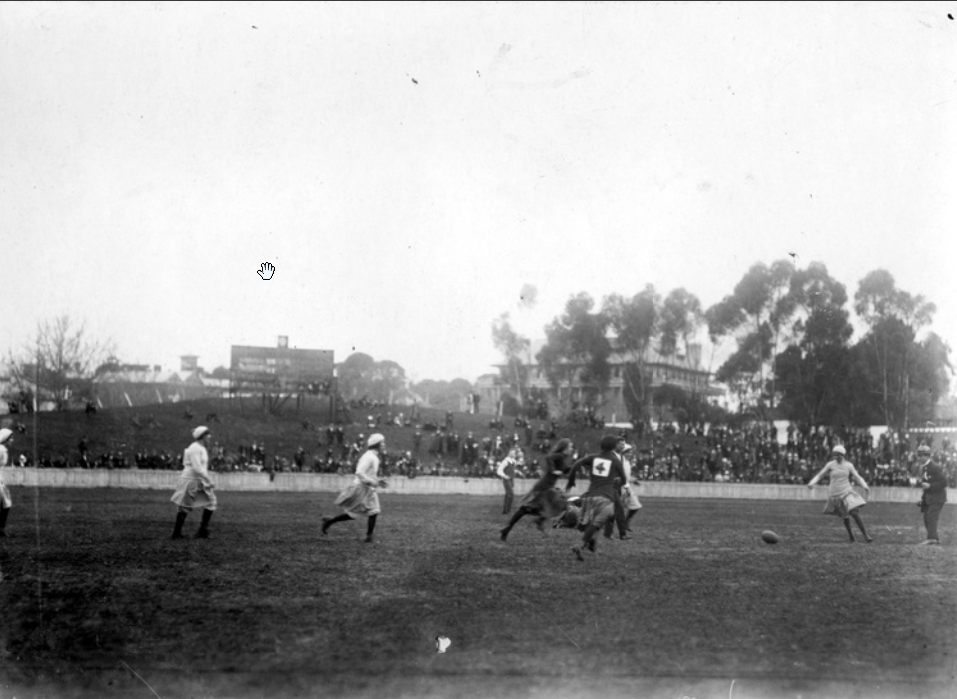
North vs South. Jubilee Oval, Adelaide. 21 September 1918

In September 1918 the Australian Red Cross organised a number of fundraising "ladies football" matches including a match at Broken Hill, New South Wales between teams of the 27th Battalion and Artillery as well as several in South Australia including Morphett Vale took on Coo-ee, as well as matches involving the factory of Charles Moore and Co. Perhaps the highest profile match was between North Adelaide iand South Adelaide at the Jubilee Oval in Adelaide on the 21st.

In South Australia, an early example of Women's football was a Port Adelaide Women's team in November, 1918 where a game took place at Alberton Oval between Port Adelaide and another club representing Thebarton. Port Adelaide was captained by Eileen Rend.

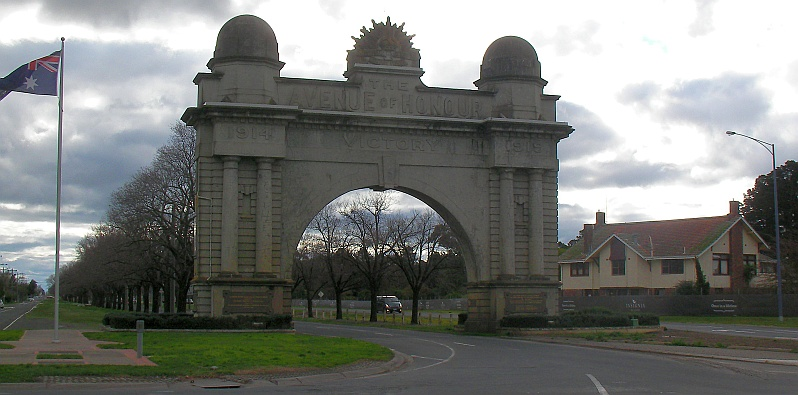
Ballarat's Arch of Victory was erected with funds raised from a Ladies Football match at nearby City Oval

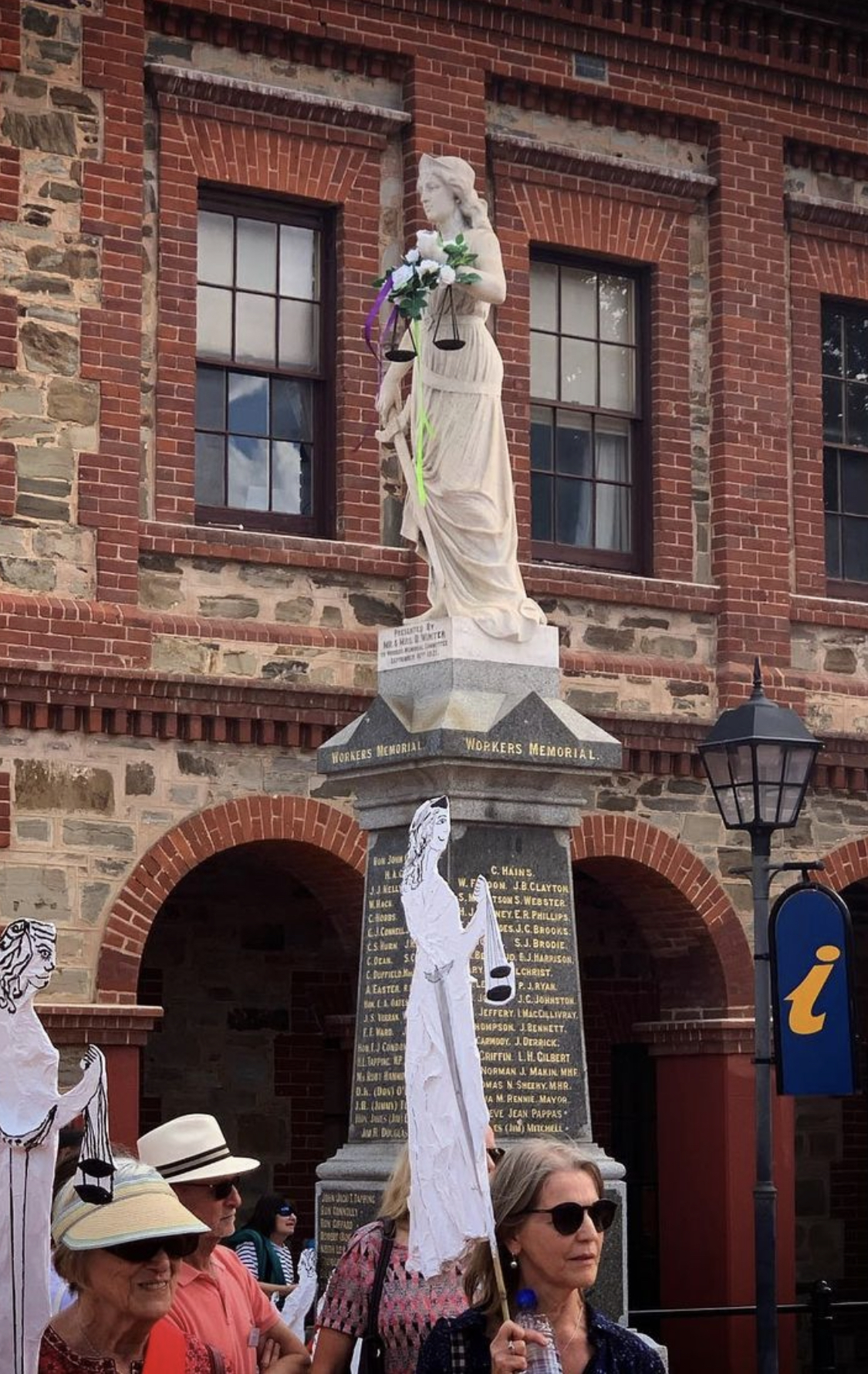
Port Adelaide Workers Memorial was erected with funds raised from a Ladies Football Match on Alberton Oval.

=== Interwar era: Female football challenges stereotypes ===
Perth's successful "Shopgirls Premiership" competition continued after the war and through the 1920s and included teams from Brennan's drapery and Foy & Gibson among others.

Women's teams were formed at Riverton, South Australia, to play scratch matches in 1920.

The first match to be played in Melbourne was in 1921. According to the AFL Record, following World War I, a match in Melbourne was held to show that women could play what had previously been seen to be a man's sport. The first women's match attracted a large crowd and interest. The umpire wore a skirt. In 1921, a women's team in St Kilda organised a game with the women wearing kits donated by the St Kilda men's club and shorts rather than dresses. A team regularly practiced on Saturday mornings at the St Kilda Cricket Ground.

Other high drawing matches were played in Western Australia between Kalgoorlie and Kalgoorlie Railways.

In 1922, a Fitzroy female team travelled to Perth and played West Perth in front of 13,500 spectators.

The 1923 Richmond ladies football team played against the men's side in Melbourne to raise funds for a junior trip.

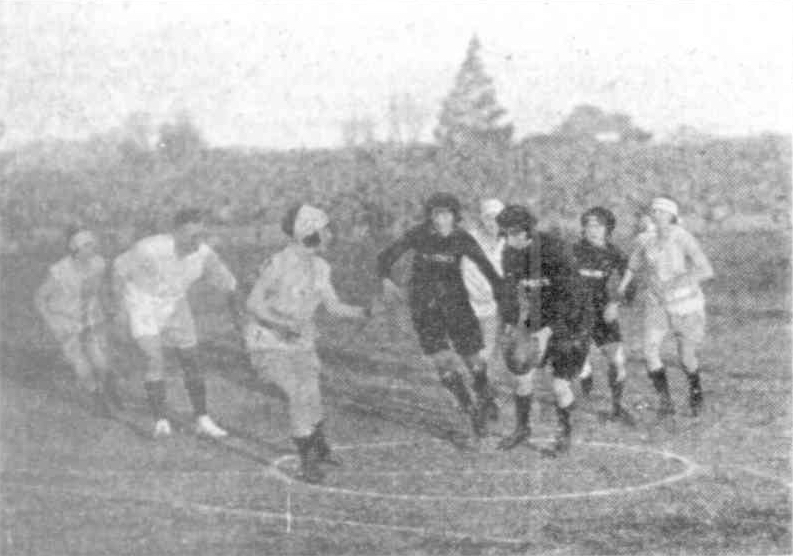
In 1929 a Women's Australian rules football match played at Adelaide Oval attracted a record 41,000 spectators.

In 1929, as part of an annual charity day, a 30-minute match was played on Adelaide Oval between workers of the Charles Moore & Co. factory and the Mirror Shirt and Pyjama Factory. Although the match was not a standalone event, newspapers at the time did refer to it as the main attraction of the day. A moth biplane dropped the game ball to start the match. In 1930, the club captain and secretary Veronica O'Callahan announced that the Charles Moore's club was going into recess, claiming that the game is "too rough" to become popular with girls in Adelaide. Nevertheless, Port Adelaide Magpies reformed a women's team for the following year to play against a team from Queenstown. In August 1930, a charity match was organised in Perth on what is now the WACA Ground.

In 1931, women protested against all-female matches being organised for Melbourne. That year, Oakleigh and Carnegie Football girls' clubs staged a match in front of a large crowd at Caulfield Racecourse in Melbourne.

In 1933, a match played between Carlton and Richmond women's teams at Princes Park stadium in Melbourne was incorrectly billed on Sydney company Cinesound Newsreel as the "first women's rugby match"; the teams were composed mostly of female netball and track-and-field athletes eager to try Australian rules.

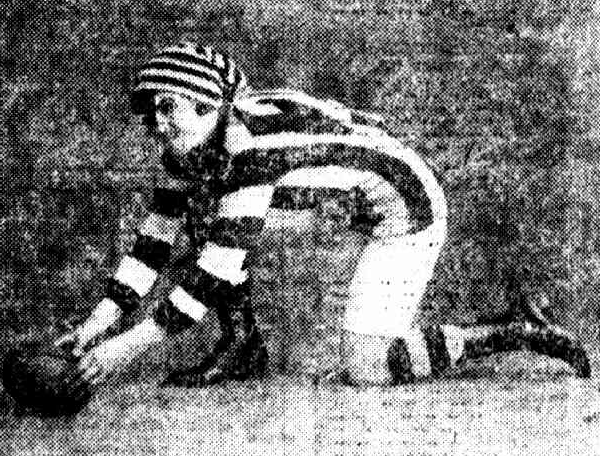
Victorian women's footballer Ivy Evans of St Kilda in 1921

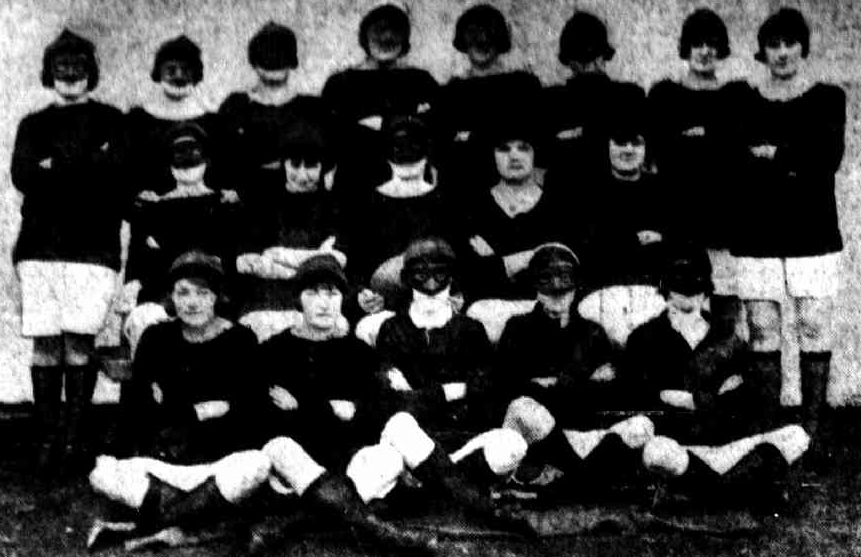
Richmond Tigresses football team in 1923, many wore masks to avoid being publicly shamed

=== Post World War II: Expansion and regular competition ===
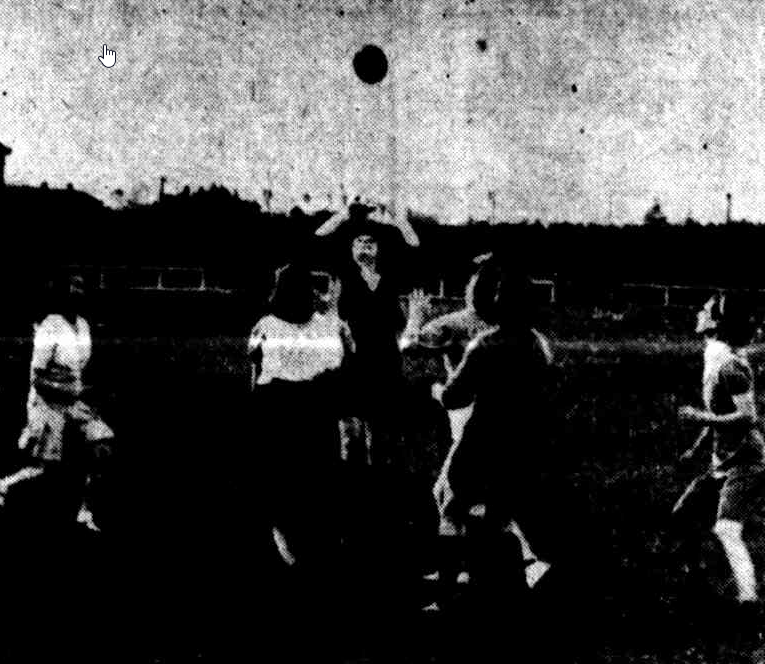
Women's football match in Launceston Tasmania in 1941

Women's football was being increasingly organised in northern Tasmania in the 1940s with the formation of several dedicated clubs and matches in Launceston.

Archives also show a charity women's match occurred on Bassendean Oval in Perth, Western Australia, 27 August 1944. It is unknown whether the game had been played continuously in the state. Another match in 1944 was held in June at Memorial Oval Port Pirie, South Australia.

Calls were made for big VFL clubs, including reigning premiers Essendon, to field women's sides in 1947. That year a round-robin competition was held at Glenferrie Oval featuring VFL clubs, with South Melbourne, Footscray, Hawthorn and St Kilda competing in an all-female competition. The league competed through the 1950s and was actively promoted by Footscray VFL champions "Mr Football" Ted Whitten and Jack Collins.

Regular girls football was also being played in North West Tasmania, with clubs in Ulverstone and Devonport playing in 1946. Tasmanian Football League clubs Launceston and Clarence added women's teams to the competition in 1947. Matches were also being played in the Wimmera-Mallee region of Victoria in towns such as Hopetoun, Lascelles and Camperdown.

By 1947, the Adelaide women's competition had grown to seven teams.

In 1953, a South Fremantle women's side took on and defeated Boans Limited at Perth Oval.

In 1954, girls' football matches were held at Cobram.

In 1959, a Victorian squad composed of Footscray players was defeated by a Tasmanian team.

In 1967, a charity match was played in Regent's Park in London, between Aussie Girls and Wild Colonial Girls as a curtain raiser to a promotional men's match.

In 1970 in Brisbane, Queensland, the Sherwood and Western Districts clubs began an annual women's competition which continued until 1985. The Mt Gravatt Football Club also had a dedicated women's team from 1973.

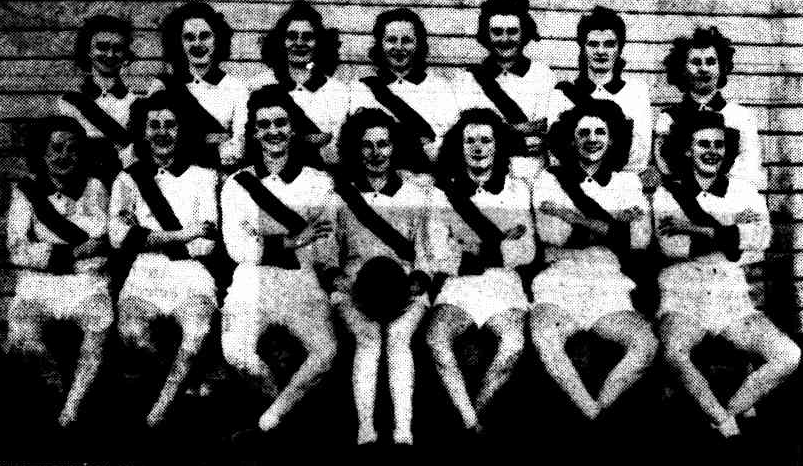
Clarence (Tasmania) women's football team in 1947

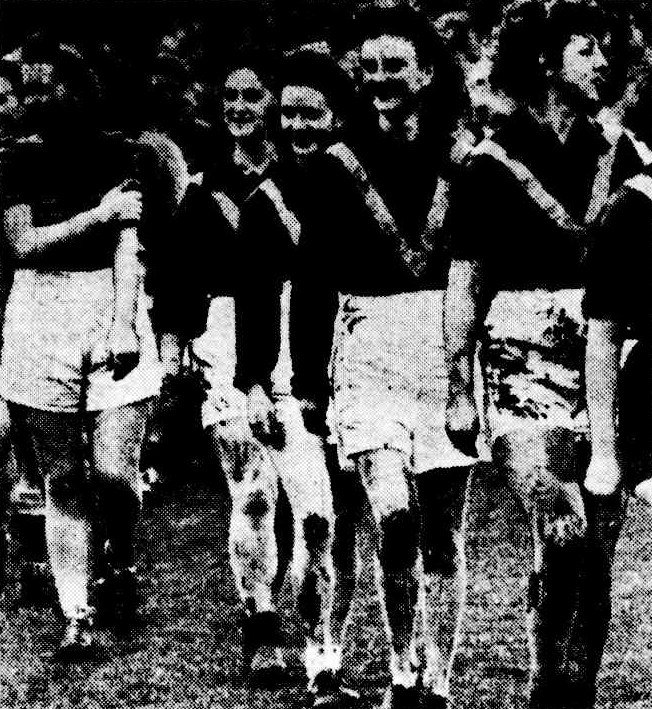
Women's lightning premiership players aligned with VFL clubs St Kilda and South Melbourne in 1947

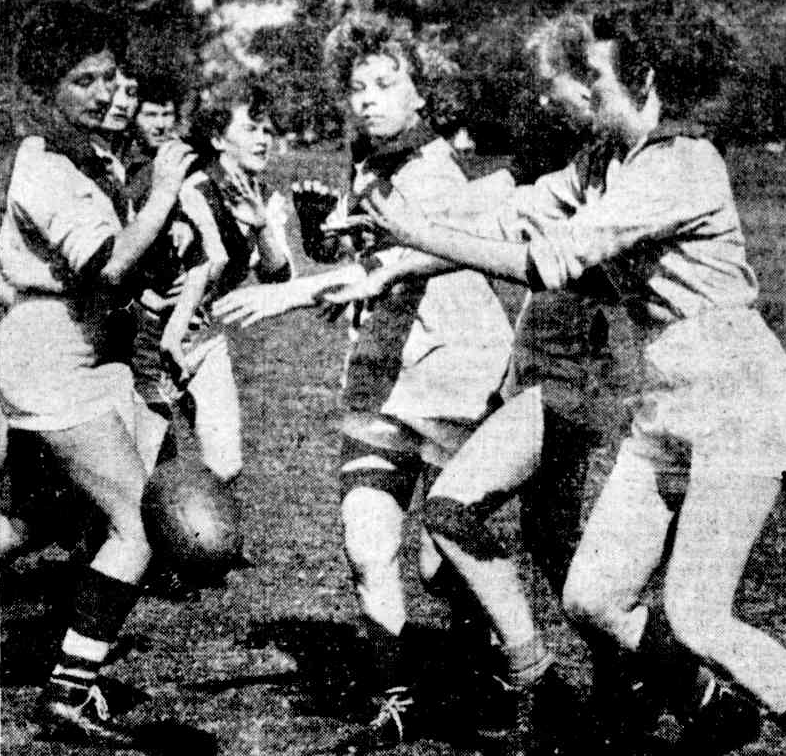
South Fremantle vs Boans Limited women's football match at Perth Oval in 1953

=== 1980s: The modern leagues emerge ===
Beyond this and occasional matches over the years, women's football was rarely organised until the formation of the Victorian Women's Football League in 1981, with four teams competing at open level. With the West Australian Women's Football League's formation in 1988, followed by that of the South Australian Women's Football League in 1991, there were competitions in the three major states in the sport. A women's competition in Sydney began in 1999 and a QAFL Women's competition was formed in Brisbane in 2001, Queensland's first women's league after one off matches from as early as the 1970s.

The first national junior championships for girls were established in 1992 with the advent of the first AFL Women's National Championship, while junior sides later took part in the first AFL Women's Under 18 Championships in 2008–2010.

Women's Australian rules football began to rapidly grow in 2000, with the number of registered teams increasing by a phenomenal 450%.

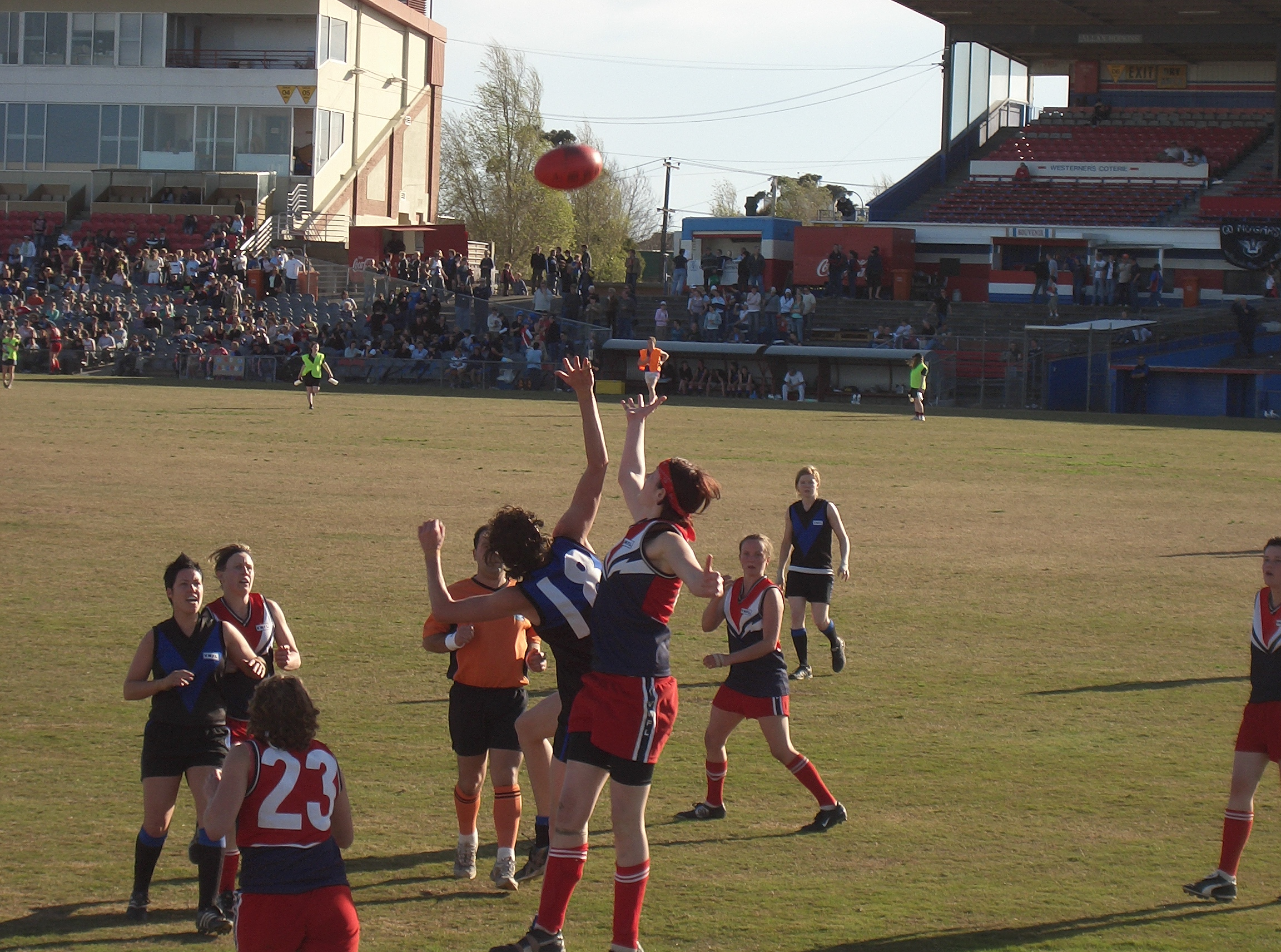
2005 VWFL Grand Final between Melbourne University women's team and Darebin Falcons at the Whitten Oval.

In 2006 the Australian Services and the ADF conducted a national development camps for female players to form a services league.

In June 2007, the organisers of the E. J. Whitten Legends Game included, for the first time, female participants - Daisy Pearce and Shannon McFerran, both of the Victorian Women's Football League (VWFL) - enabling them to play against former men's AFL players. This significantly raised the profile of women's football in Victoria, with some of the former AFL players being outplayed by the female players. It became one of the few high-profile mixed-gender exhibition matches featuring high-profile women's players.

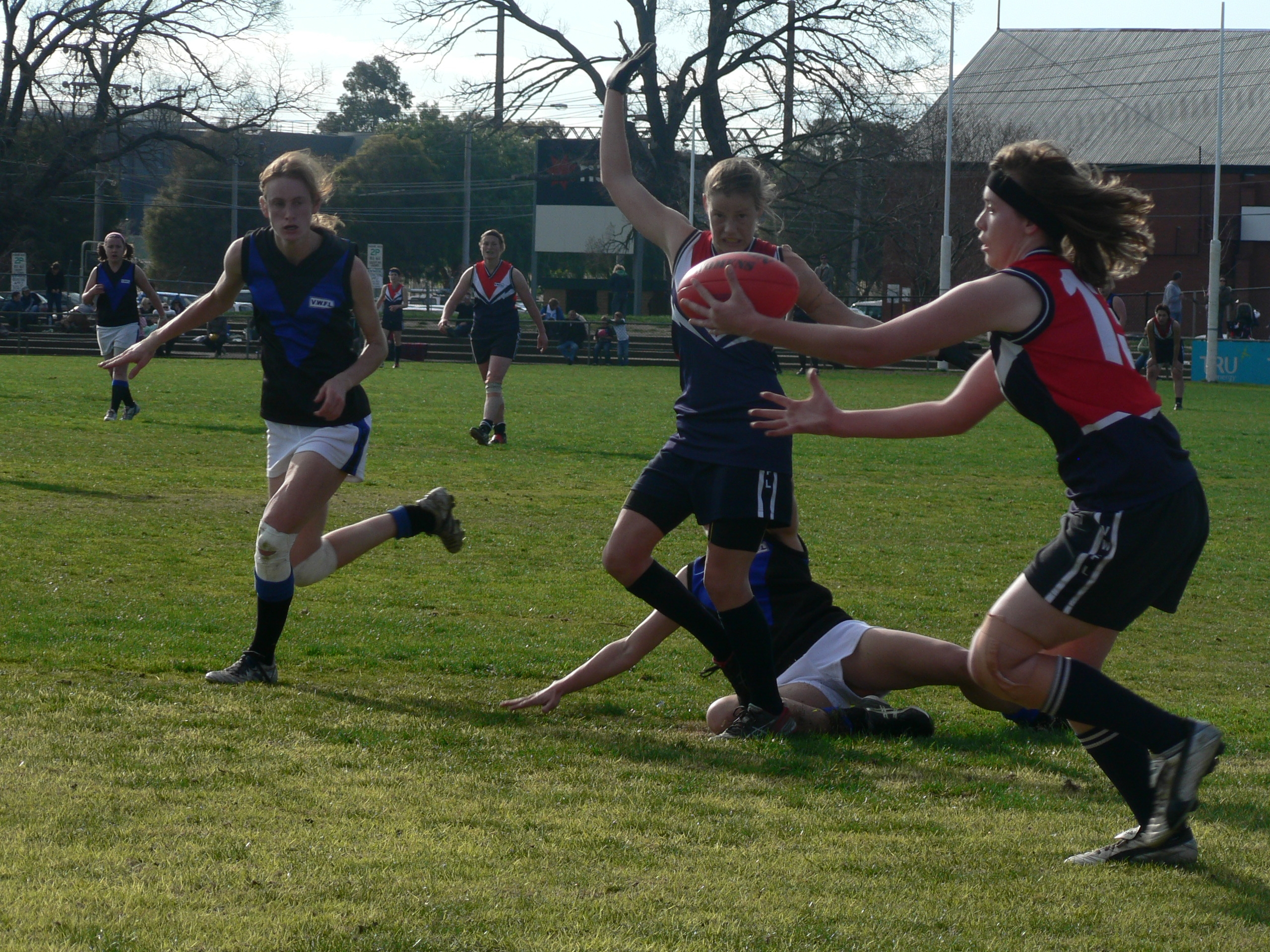
Action from the 2007 VWFL Grand Final at Preston City Oval.

The first full international game was held between the USA Freedom and Team Canada in Vancouver on Saturday 4 August 2007 in front of a crowd of almost 2,500.

In 2010, the Australian Football League (AFL) took over operations of Women's Football Australia and conducted a review of the organisation of its national organisation. This led to speculation that the AFL was investigating a national women's competition. Soon after, details of intentions emerged with the AFL slating a commencement in 2013 with four to eight teams. However the AFL would later miss this targe, postponing it until 2020 to allow its expansion clubs the Gold Coast and Greater Western Sydney time to submit their bids in full.

Not content to wait for the AFL, two of its member clubs, the Melbourne Football Club and the Western Bulldogs began organising women's matches against each other. Initially the clubs created representative teams drawn from local players from aligned VWFL clubs. In June 2013, they organised an AFL sanctioned exhibition match held at the Melbourne Cricket Ground which attracted 7,500 spectators, then a record. The two teams competed annually over the next three years for the Hampson-Hardeman Cup.

In women's Australian rules football in 2015, 163 new teams were formed, and a total of 284,501 players took part in organised games.

In 2016 the AFL began a series of exhibition matches as double headers with men's matches. That same year it opened bidding for a licences to participate by 13 existing AFL teams, with eight teams awarded licences to participate in the inaugural season with the competition to be known as "AFL Women's" or AFLW for short.

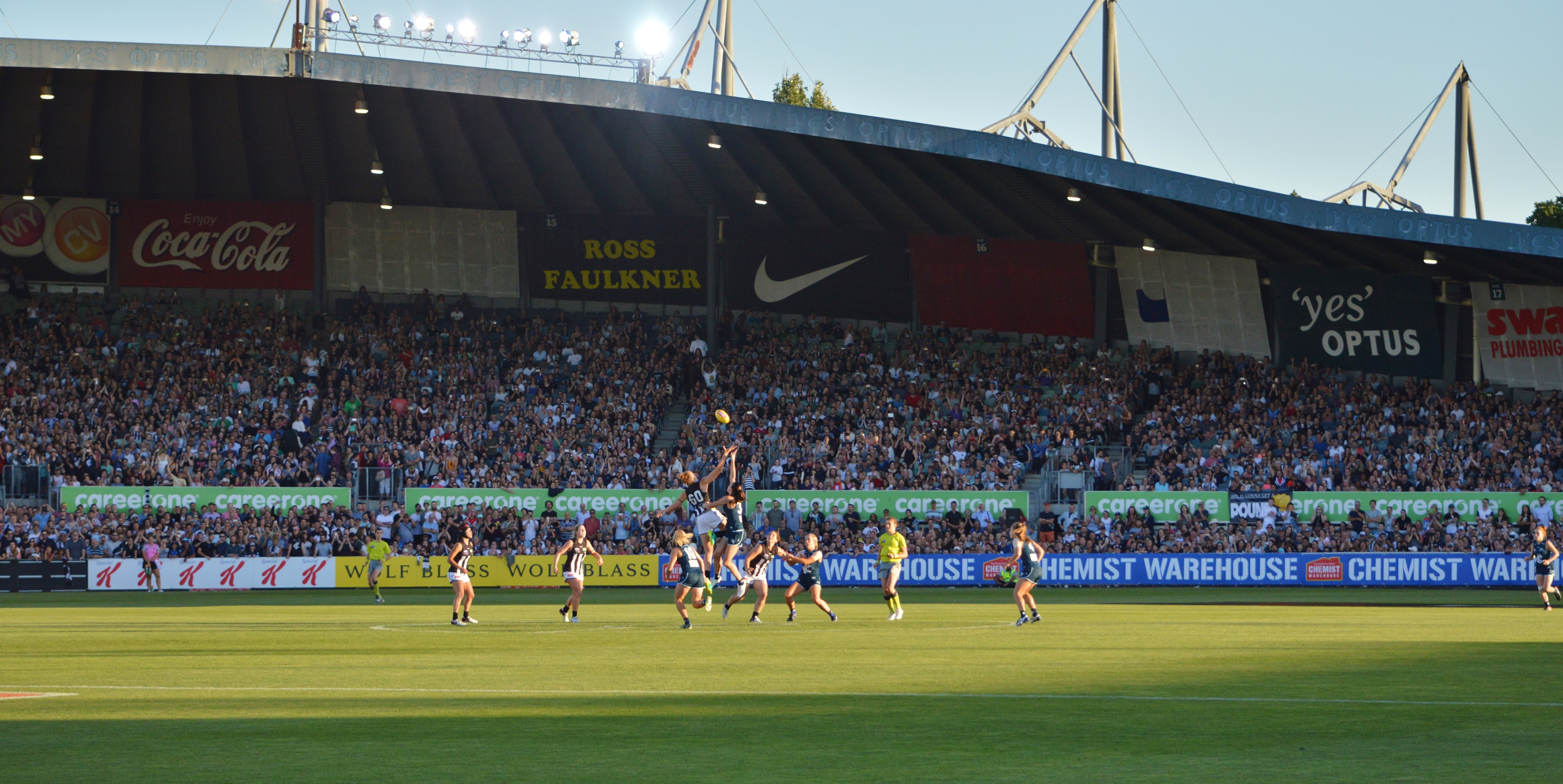
The first ball up of the inaugural 2017 AFL Women's season between Carlton and Collingwood at Princes Park

The inaugural AFLW match was held at Ikon Park in February 2017 between traditional rivals Carlton and Collingwood and attracted 27,500 fans, however over 2,000 people were locked out due to security concerns. The AFL apologised for the lock out which turned away fans stating that it had underestimated demand, expecting just 12,000 people. Despite this, the league later ruled out hosting women's matches at Docklands Stadium or the code's spiritual home Melbourne Cricket Ground deeming them to be too large for the women's game. As such, this was to remain a long standing record attendance for Victoria.

During its debut season the AFLW also broke women's football attendance records in all states and territories except South Australia, including Tasmania, the Northern Territory and Australian Capital Territory where no teams were based. The inaugural Grand Final held on the Gold Coast set a new record for the women's game in Queensland with an attendance of 15,610. Following the AFLW season, the first State of Origin match in the code for almost a decade, attracting 9,400 to Docklands Stadium to watch Victoria women's team take on the Allies.

In 2018, an AFLW match between Fremantle and Collingwood at the new Perth Stadium set a new record for women's domestic football with 41,975 in attendance. This was eclipsed by the 2019 AFLW Grand Final in Adelaide with 53,034 at the Adelaide Oval.

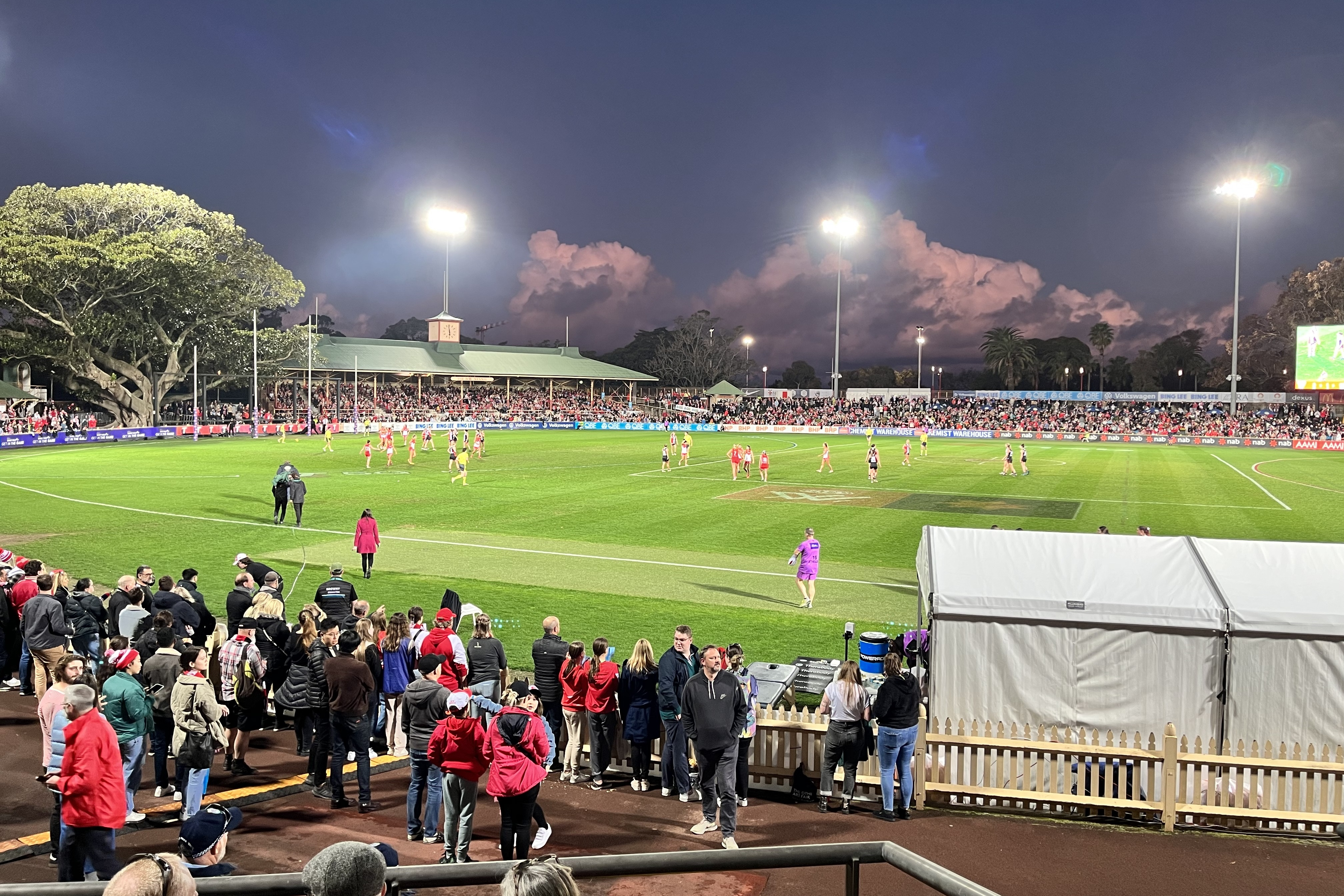
A new record crowd for women's Australian rules football in New South Wales was set at the North Sydney Oval on 27 August 2022 with 8,264 in attendance.

The Round 1 AFL Women's Season 7 match between Sydney and St Kilda at the North Sydney Oval on 27 August 2022 - also the first ever match for the Swans' women's team - set a new record crowd for a stand-alone women's Australian rules match attendance in New South Wales with 8,264.

In March 2022, the AFL scheduled the first ever AFLW match at the MCG the code's spiritual home, the Preliminary final. Initially expected to be against high drawing Melbourne side Collingwood, the event was upset by the low drawing out of town Brisbane Lions making the final. Nevertheless, the following year, in August, a round 1 AFLW match between local rivals Essendon and Hawthorn was moved from ETU Stadium to Marvel Stadium following a sell-out, forcing the league to consider changing its policy on use of larger venues.

== Rule modifications ==
Some women's competitions, but not all, are played with modified rules.

The main rule differences between women's and men's versions of Australian football involves modified tackling rules. Typically, aggressive slinging (swinging a player by the jumper or throwing the player to the ground) of opposition players in a tackle is not allowed. However, like the men's game, head-high contact is also not allowed.

Another main difference is the size of the ball: a slightly smaller ball to the men's version is often used to reduce hand injuries when marking the ball.

Games of International rules football are also played by many women's leagues against Gaelic Athletic Association clubs, and Recreational football, a fully non-contact version of Australian rules football, is also becoming popular amongst women in Australia and the United States. Many women's leagues also fall into the emerging 9-a-side footy or Metro footy formats.

== Competitions ==
=== AFLW National league ===
A national competition backed by the AFL began in 2017 with eight teams and by 2022 all 18 AFL clubs have fielded an AFLW team. The AFLW has attracted an audience of more than 1 million attendees and 2 million viewers and has managed to maintain high interest despite moving to primarily ticketed and subscription broadcasting models. It consistently ranks in the top three (alongside cricket and netball) most watched women's sporting competitions in Australia.

=== National Championships ===
Women's Football Australia were responsible for the annual AFL Women's National Championship, which ran from 1992 to 2015. After the 2015 edition, the AFL arranged the 2016 Exhibition Series and announced the formation of the AFLW in September 2016: with this, the raison d'etre for the Championship and Women's Football Australia ceased to exist, and they were dissolved.

In its history, eleven teams - two from Victoria (a senior team and an under-19s team), and single teams from the ACT, Northern Territory, New South Wales, South Australia, Western Australia, the Australian Defence Force, Queensland, Papua New Guinea and Tasmania - participated, with Victoria winning all of the championships (all but one by their senior team).

=== International competition ===
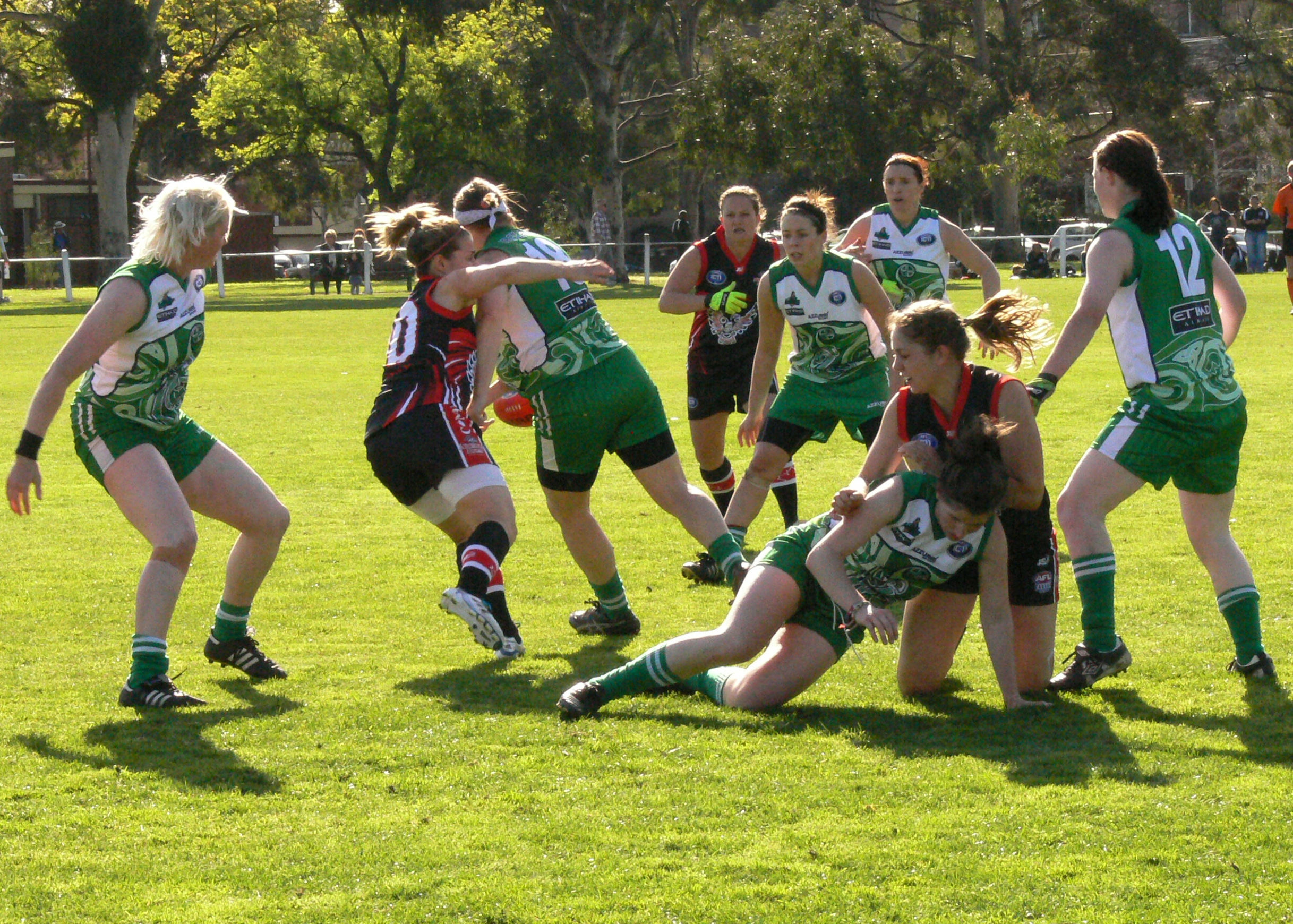
An amateurs match between Ireland and the United States in the women's division of the 2011 Australian Football International Cup

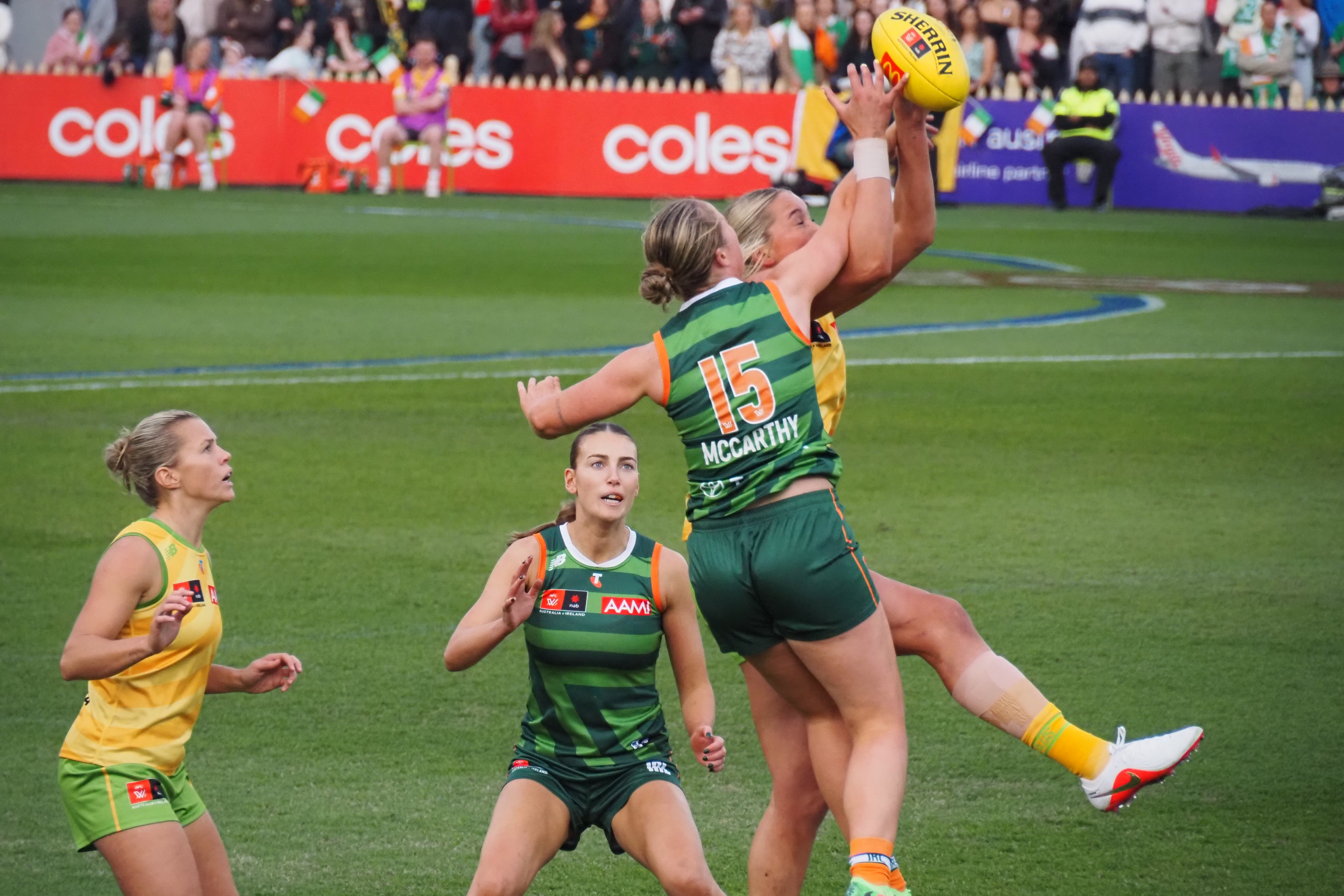
Action from the first ever fully professional international: 2026 AFL Women's Australia v Ireland match.

There was a women's division at the 2008 Australian Football International Cup with Australia, US, Canada and Papua New Guinea competing. There is also International Rules Football with a women's Australia women's international rules football team competing against the Ireland women's international rules football team. The 2006 tour helped to lift the profile of the sport slightly in Australia.

The first ever full international was held between the US "Freedom" and Team Canada in Vancouver on Saturday 4 August 2007. The US Freedom toured Australia in August 2009 playing teams in Sydney, Cairns, Bendigo, and Melbourne over an 8-day period.

Papua New Guinea's national team, the "Kurakums", competed in the AFL Women's National Championship before the Championship was dissolved in 2015.

14 May 2026, the first professional-level match was played between Australia and Ireland with Australia taking the honours.

== Participation figures ==
The AFL's participation estimate for females is 530,166 participants worldwide in 2021.

During the 1970s, 1980s and 1990s, women's Australian rules football saw a large expansion in the number of competitors. In 1998, Auskick, a national program began. The program was designed to introduce the game to primary school aged children. By 2006, it had over 140,000 participants each year. Though the program was never specifically aimed at girls, the safe non-contact environment proved popular and in 2007 about 16% (12%) in of all Auskick participants were female.

In Australia, a total of 18,609 girls and women played Australian rules football in 2005 and in 2006 48,054 women played the sport in Australia, and it is one of the fastest growing sports among women in Australia.

By 2017, a record number of 463,364 females were playing Australian rules football across the nation, making up 30% of all participants. The number of female Australian Rules Football teams reached 1,690 nationally, a huge 76% increase on the previous year.

== By region ==
=== Australia ===
There are women's Australian rules football teams in all states and territories of Australia.

==== Victoria ====
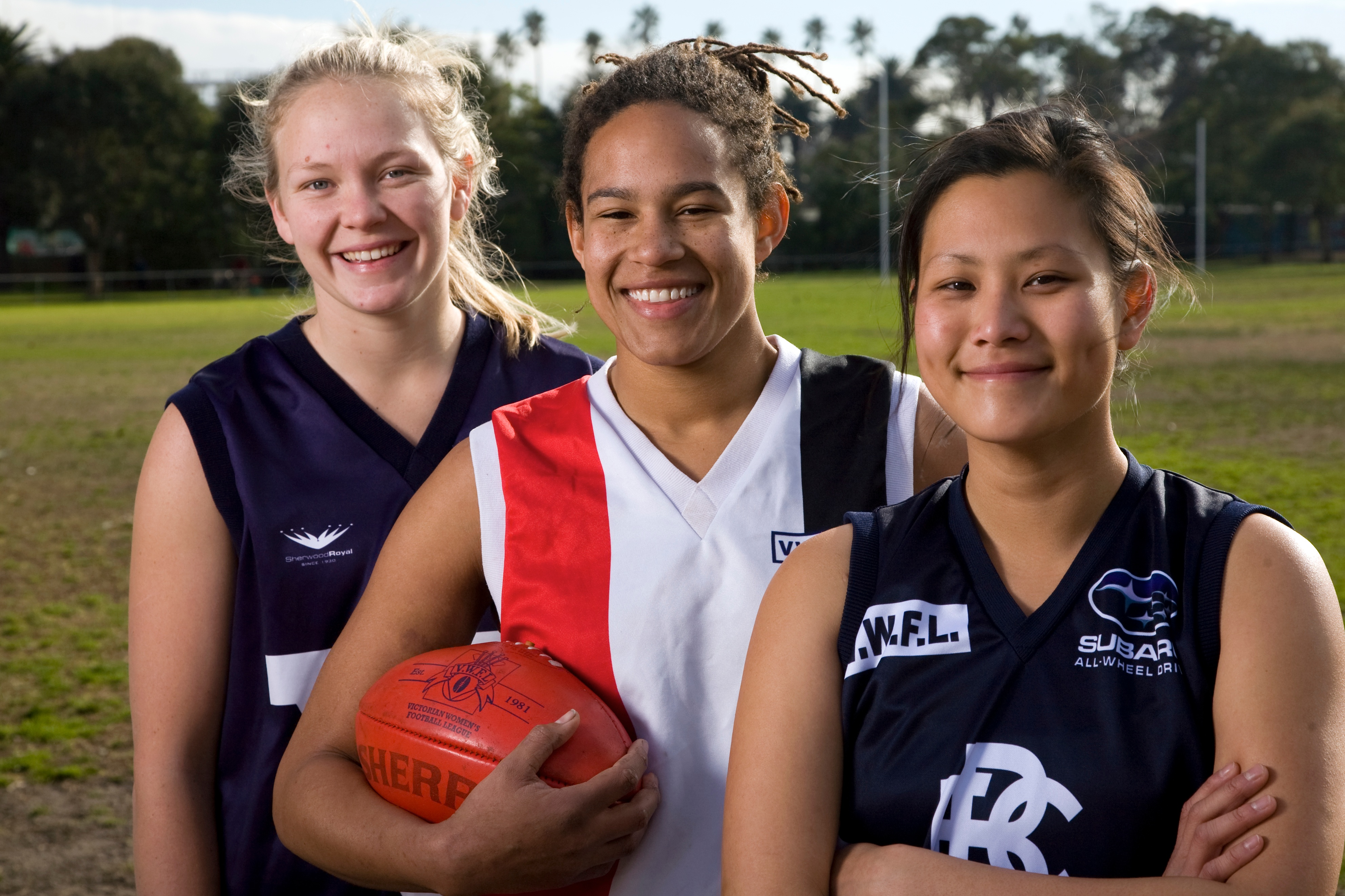
Players in the Victorian Women's Football League, 2008, left to right: Phoebe McWilliams, Rachel Achampong and Avril Chow

Organised women's Australian rules football has been played in Victoria since 1981 with the formation of the Victorian Women's Football League (VWFL), the oldest and largest Australian rules football league for women in the world.

Women's football in Victoria has a comparatively high profile in the media. The work done by League president Debbie Lee and Media Manager Leesa Catto as well as involvement by celebrities such as Tiffany Cherry have helped to boost exposure for the sport. The VWFL Grand Final is now played in front of a crowd exceeding 1,500 people. The annual Vic Country vs Vic Metro match has been now played as a curtain raiser to a home and away Australian Football League match at the Melbourne Cricket Ground. VWFL players have participated in charity matches against senior male players in both the AFL Legends Game (which is broadcast on television in multiple states and live in Victoria) and Community Cup.

The VWFL is an open age Women's Footy competition which began in 1981 with four teams. In the following decades it has grown substantially and now features 3 division structure and as well as many clubs fielding teams in the reserve grades for the first and second division. In 2004 the League affiliated with Football Victoria. In 2005 there were 24 teams (from 20 clubs) in total, with over 800 women taking part.

A U17 Youth Girls Competition was established by Football Victoria in 2004. This was following legal action taken against them in the Victorian Civil and Administrative Tribunal (following a complaint to the Equal Opportunity Commission) by Penny Cula-Reid, Emily Stayner, and Helen Taylor. The three schoolgirls were banned from playing in junior leagues, with fears of expensive insurance liability in case of injury and "medical reasons" being cited by Football Victoria (i.e. the physical differences between the bodies of boys and girls). The court found in favour of the girls in February 2004. In response to the ruling, the U17 Youth Girls Competition began in May, with 122 girls participating.

Victoria fields both senior and under 19 in the AFL Women's National championships and have been the dominant state, with the two teams combined having won every one of the 15 national titles.

==== Western Australia ====
Organised Women's Australian rules football has been played in Western Australia since 1988, with the first premiership being won by Mount Lawley. Although it has less clubs than Queensland, Western Australia is considered the strongest women's state outside of Victoria. The strongest clubs are in Perth.

==== South Australia ====
In 1990, a group of South Australian women helped instigate an exhibition match between a South Australian side and the Victorian Women's Football League. The success of the match saw the formation of the SAWFL for the next season. The clubs are centred in Adelaide.

In 2023, Australian rules football player Heather Anderson of Adelaide became the first female athlete diagnosed with CTE after her death by suicide on 13 November 2022, at the age of 28. Her brain, which was donated to the Australian Sports Brain Bank, was found to contain multiple CTE lesions, and abnormalities were found "nearly everywhere" in the cortex.

==== New South Wales ====
The Sydney Women's AFL competition is the only organised women's football in New South Wales. It has been running since 2000 and has grown substantially in popularity. Centred on metropolitan Sydney it has two divisions and 12 clubs in 2013. In 2015, the Black Diamond AFL commenced its inaugural women's competition in the Newcastle and Central Coast regions. Six clubs participated in the inaugural season (Maitland, Newcastle City, Nelson Bay, Warners Bay, Lake Macquarie and Wyong Lakes), with Newcastle City defeating Nelson Bay by 22 points in the Grand Final to claim the first BDAFL Women's premiership. The competition expanded to ten clubs in 2016 with teams from Singleton, Cardiff, Killarney Vale and Gosford entering teams. Nelson Bay avenged their 2015 heartbreak with an undefeated season culminating in a 3-point win over Newcastle City in the Grand Final. The competition continues to gain momentum with hopes of a second division being created in the near future.

==== Queensland ====
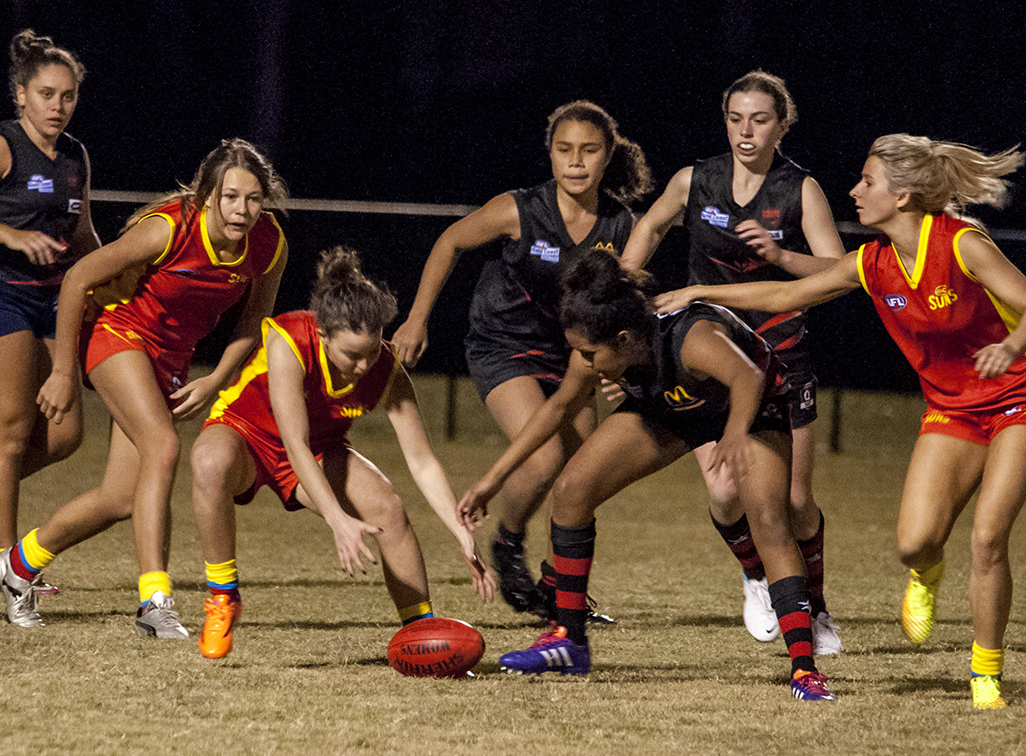
Players contest the ball during a match between Bond University and Burleigh Heads, Queensland.

There are leagues centred in South-East Queensland and Central Queensland, and the cities of Cairns, Townsville, and Mackay.

==== Tasmania ====
Tasmanian Women's Football League

=== Outside Australia ===
==== Africa ====
AFL South Africa runs a junior program which includes girls in mixed competition. There are plans for a junior girls' league in the North West Province.

==== Americas ====
Organised women's football is played in the United States (organised by the Women's Australian Football Association) and Canada (organised by the Canada Women's Australian Football League). The first match in the United States was played in Kansas City in October 2003. A women's division was introduced to the USAFL National Championships in 2005. Both the U.S. national team (known as the USA Freedom) and the Canadian national team (known as the Northern Lights) have played in the Australian Football International Cup. Outside of those countries, an under-19s championship with male and female divisions was held in Argentina in 2007.

==== Asia-Pacific ====
The Canterbury AFL in Christchurch played the first official women's football match in New Zealand late in 2006.

Also in 2006, AFL PNG (the sport's governing body in Papua New Guinea announced their first women's team (Under 16s) to take part in the Australian national women's tournament. By 2016 it was estimated that there were around 200 women's Australian rules footballers in PNG. In 2015 women's matches began in Nauru. In 2018, a women's division was added to the Asian Australian Football Championships signalling all-women's matches in many countries including Singapore, Vietnam and Malaysia. The arrival of women's programs in Tonga, Fiji and Vanuatu saw a women's division added to the Oceania Cup as well as an Asia-Pacific women's Academy.

In Japan, Australian rules football is played in many universities. Women's footy is played by the Tokyo Geckos, the Irish Galahs (Gaelic football) and Osaka Bilbies.

==== Europe ====
The first ever women's footy match in the UK was organised by Aussie Rules UK and was held in London on 21 April 2007 as part of the ANZAC Sports Challenge. Since then, women's Australian rules football teams have been formed across Europe, with women's teams representing England, Ireland, Scotland, France, Sweden, Croatia, and a combined Wales/Denmark team competing at the 2017 Australian Rules Football European championship, known as the Euro Cup. There is a women's league in London, founded in 2015, which currently consists of teams from 7 clubs across two divisions.

There are also University-based women's Australian rules football teams across Europe, such as at the Universities of Cork, Birmingham, Oxford, and Cambridge. The University of Oxford founded a women's team in 2015, with the University of Cambridge following in 2017. After more than 100 years since the first recorded men's Oxford versus Cambridge Australian rules football varsity match (as reported in the Kalgoorlie Miner newspaper in 1911) the first women's Australian rules varsity match was played in Oxford in March 2018 and resulted in a draw.

=== Notable Internationals ===
While there are an increasing number of professional and semi-professional players with multicultural backgrounds, increasingly players from outside of Australia are also finding pathways to semi-professional leagues. Like the AFL, this includes a large number of Irish converts from gaelic games such as Laura Duryea, Cora Staunton and Clara Fitzpatrick among others. However it also includes players from other countries (many with a rugby background) including New Zealand: Brooke Walker, Makaela Tuhakaraina, Lucy Single, Jesse Tawhiao-Wardlaw, Dee Heslop and Vaomua Laloifi; the United States: Danielle Marshall (USA); Canada: Kendra Heil and South Sudan: Akec Makur Chuot.

Of these, Laura Duryea and Clara Fitzpatrick (Ireland) and Kendra Heil (Canada) have represented their country at international level.

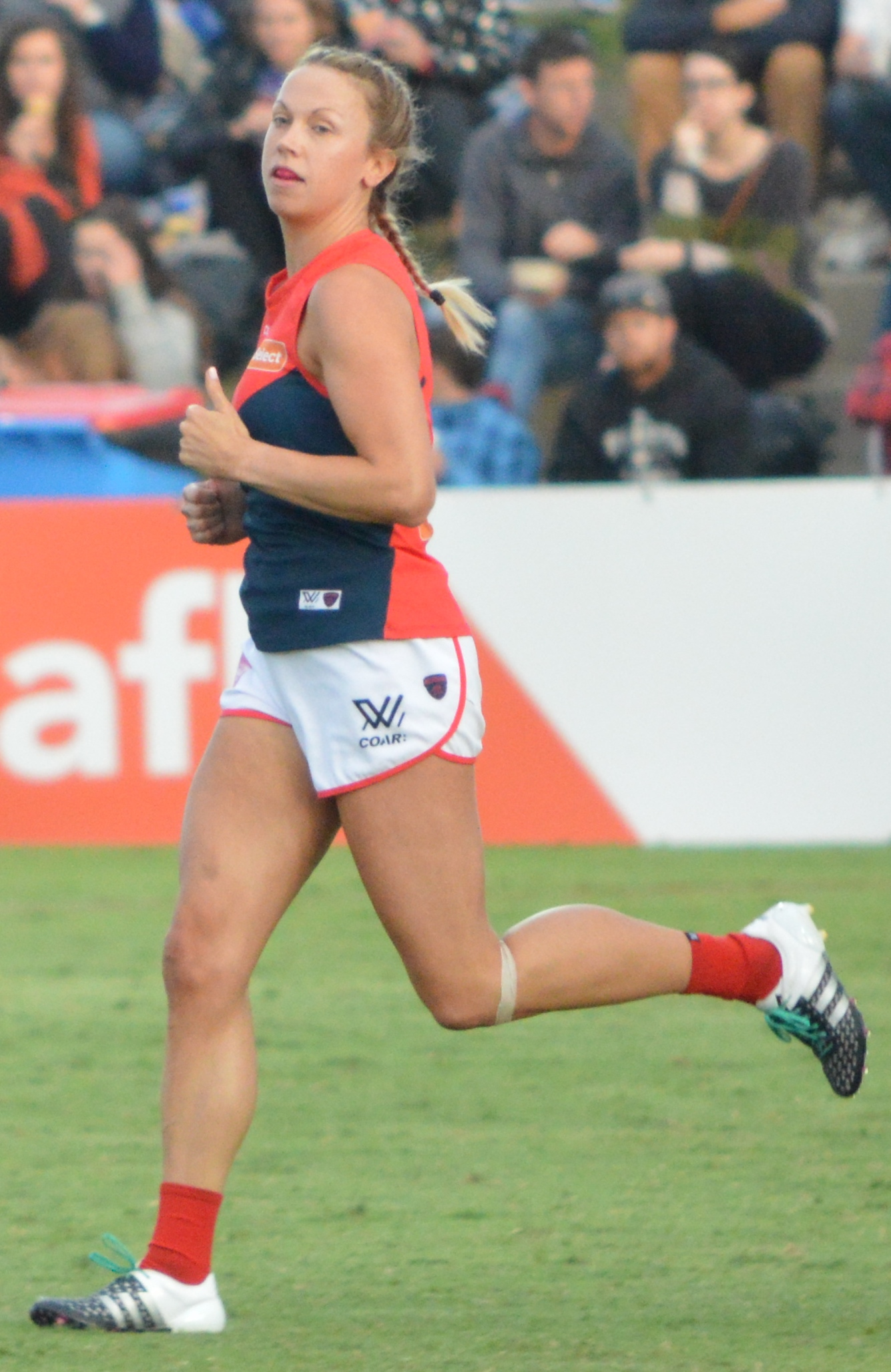
Laura Duryea (Ireland representative player) is from Milltown, Ireland

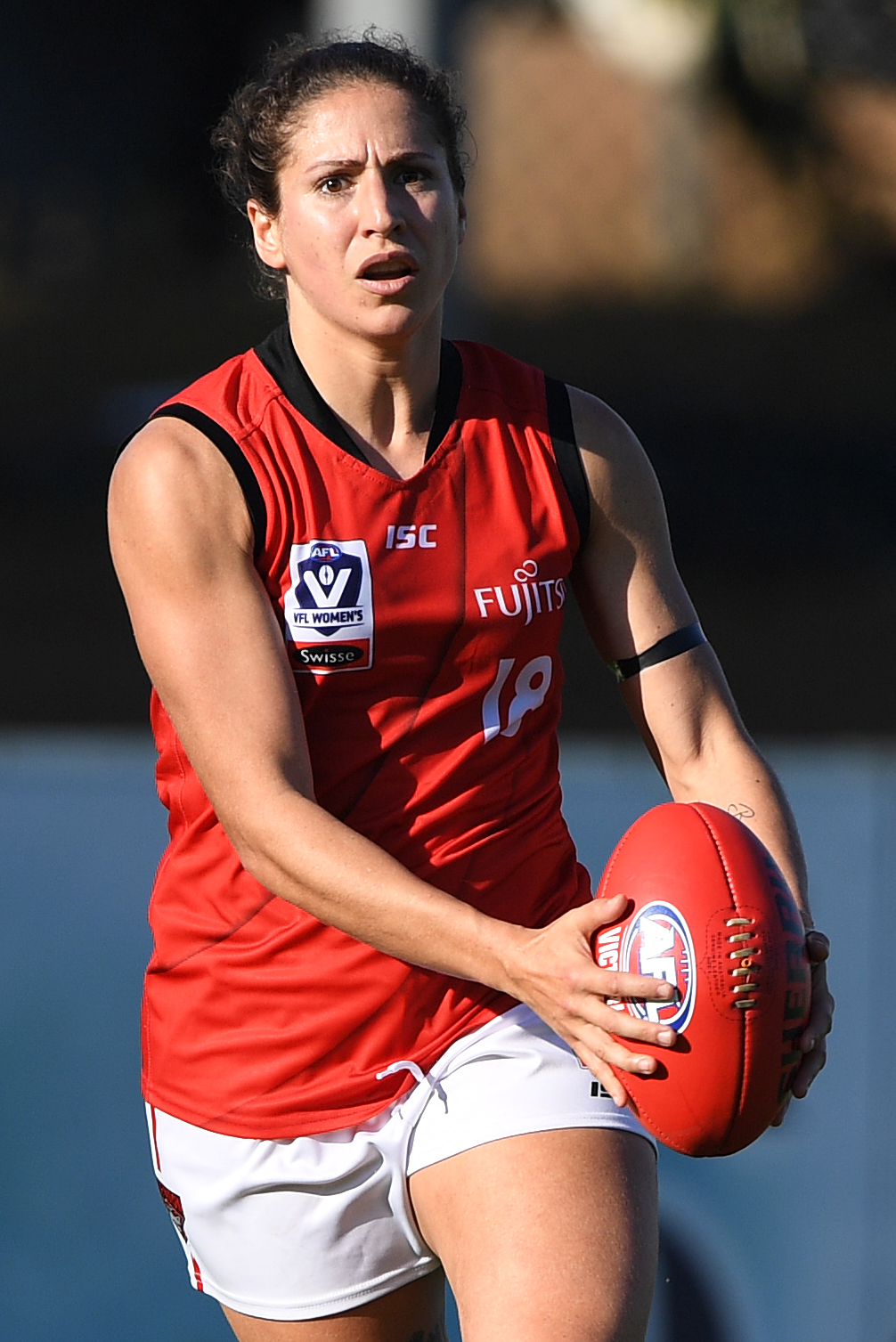
Kendra Heil (Canada representative player) is from Simcoe, Ontario, Canada

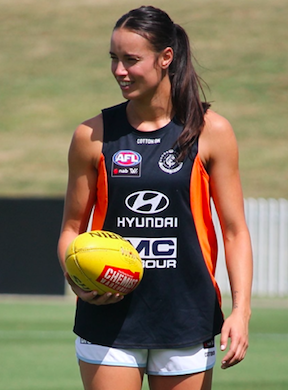
Brooke Walker is from Auckland, New Zealand

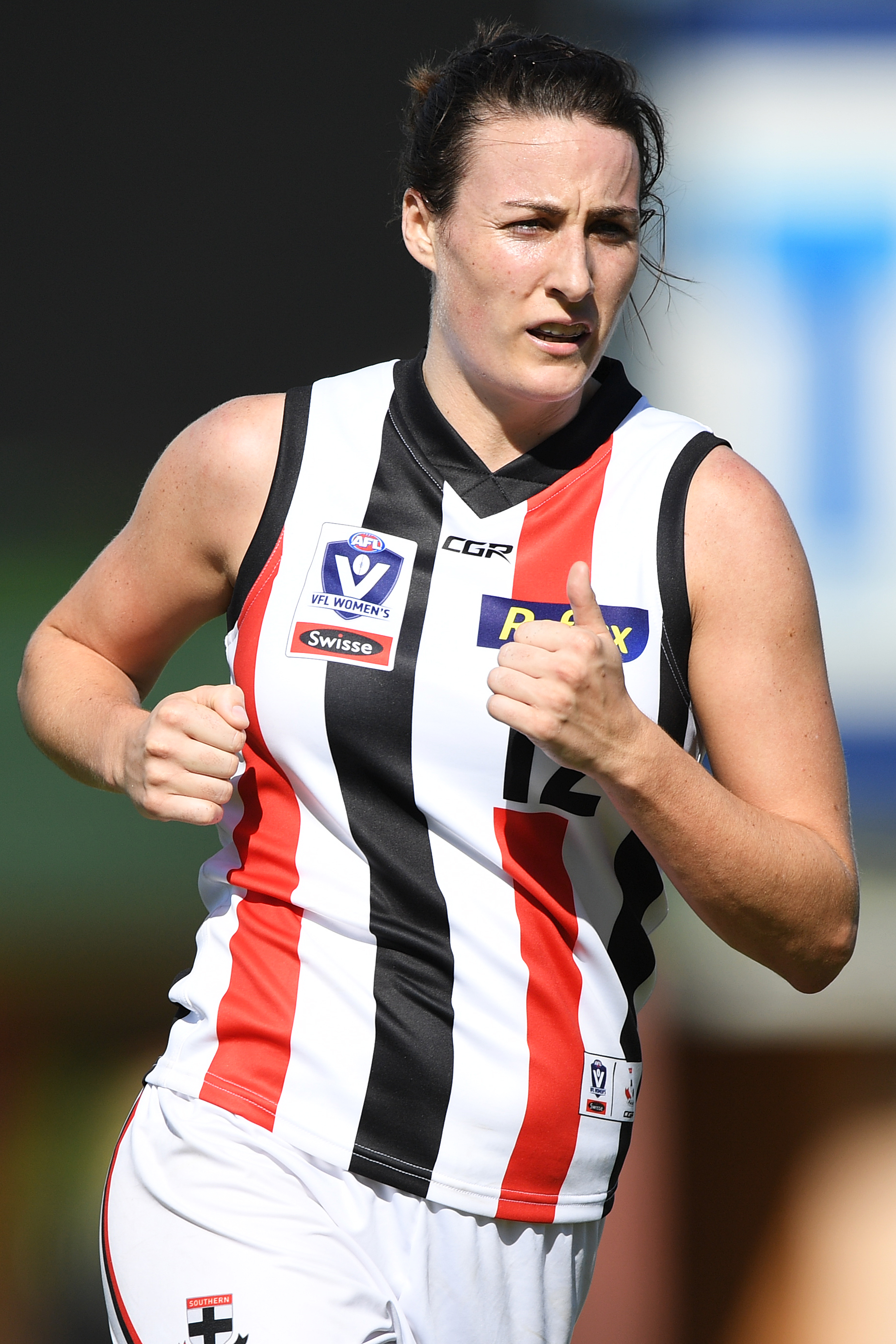
Clara Fitzpatrick (Ireland representative player) is from Bryansford, Northern Ireland

== LGBTI issues ==
In September 2017 the AFL ruled that a transgender woman, Hannah Mouncey, was ineligible for selection in the 2018 AFLW draft. There was opposition to the AFL's decision, and she can continue to play for her Canberra club.

== See also ==
- List of Australian rules football women's leagues
- List of International Australian rules football Tournaments
- AFL Women's National Championships
- International rules football
- Rec Footy
- 9-a-side footy
- Touch Aussie Rules
- Kick-to-kick
- Australian rules football
- Metro Footy
- Women's sports

== Bibliography ==
- Lenkić, Brunette; Hess, Rob (2016). Play On!: The Hidden History of Women's Australian Rules Football. Victoria Echo Publishing. ISBN 9781760063160.
