= AFWL =

AFWL may refer to:

- Alberta Footy Women's League, an Australian football league in Canada
- American Football Women's League, an American football league
- Air Force Weapons Laboratory, predecessor of the US Air Force Research Laboratory
