= Australia national rugby team =

Australia national rugby team may refer to national teams in the different varieties of rugby:

- Australia national rugby union team, often nicknamed the Wallabies, administered by the Australian Rugby Union.
  - Australia national rugby sevens team compete in the World Sevens Series
- Australia national rugby league team, often nicknamed the Kangaroos, administered by Australian Rugby League.

== See also ==
- Australia national football team (disambiguation)
