= Irish women's football team =

Irish women's football team may refer to:

== Association football (soccer) ==
- Republic of Ireland women's national football team
- Northern Ireland women's national football team
- Notre Dame Fighting Irish women's soccer team, NCAA college team at Notre Dame University, Indiana, United States

== International rules football ==
- Ireland women's international rules football team (playing hybrid of Gaelic and Australian rules football)
