= St Finbarr's Gaelic Football Club =

Gaelic football club

- Founded: 1976
- County: Australasia
- Division: Western Australia GAA
- Nickname: The Green and Gold
- Colours: Green and gold

St Finbarr's Gaelic Football Club is a Gaelic football club located in the eastern suburbs of Perth, Western Australia.
