= Australia national football team (disambiguation) =

Australia national football team may refer to:

- Australia men's national soccer team (The Socceroos)
- Australia women's national soccer team (The Matildas)
- Australia national American football team (The Outbacks)
- Australia men's international rules football team
- Australia women's international rules football team
- Australia men's national rugby league team (The Kangaroos)
- Australia women's national rugby league team (The Jillaroos)
- Australia men's national rugby union team (The Wallabies)
- Australia women's national rugby union team (The Wallaroos)
- All-Australian team, an honorary all-star team in men's Australian rules football

== See also ==
- Football in Australia
- Wikipedia:Naming conventions (Football in Australia)
