= Women's Football Australia =

Women's Football Australia (WFA) was the governing body for the sport of Women's Australian rules football in Australia between 1991 and its dissolution in 2015. The organisation coordinated the Women's National Championship throughout its existence.

In 2010, the AFL gained control over women's Australian rules football, and took over the operations of Women's Football Australia.

After the 2015 edition, the AFL arranged the 2016 Exhibition Series and announced the formation of the AFLW in September 2016, along with other associated competitions including the AFL Women's Under 18 Championships and the NAB League Girls: with this, the raison d'etre for Women's Football Australia and the Championship ceased to exist, and they were both dissolved.

Consequently, the leagues it ran were either dissolved and replaced by AFL-sanctioned leagues, or are now operated by the AFL or its state/territory level bodies.

== Leagues ==
- Victorian Women's Football League
- ACTWAFL
- West Australian Women's Football League
- South Australian Women's Football League
- Sydney Women's AFL
- Northern Territory Women's Aussie Rules Football Association
- Queensland Women's AFL
- Cairns Women's AFL
- Townsville Women's AFL
- Mackay Women's AFL

== Youth Leagues ==
- Victorian Youth Girls Competition
- Queensland Youth Girls Competition
- South Australia Schoolgirls AFL
- West Australia Schoolgirls AFL

== See also ==
- List of Australian rules football women's leagues
