= Breffni Park =

Sports stadium in Ireland

Kingspan Breffni
- Páirc Bhreifne
- Location within Ireland
- Address: Creighan, Cavan, County Cavan, H12 HX02
- Location: Ireland
- Coordinates: 53°58′55″N 7°21′33″W
- Owner: Cavan GAA
- Capacity: 25,030
- Surface: Grass
- Scoreboard: Yes
- Field size: 143 x 86 m
- Public transit: Tractamotors Bus Stop; Cavan Bus Station

Construction
- Opened: 1923

Website
- cavangaa.ie

Breffni Park, known for sponsorship reasons as Kingspan Breffni, is a GAA stadium in Cavan, Ireland. It is the home of Cavan GAA. The ground has an overall capacity of about 25,030, including 5,030 seated. Breffni is the historic name for the area of counties Cavan and Leitrim. Cavan is often referred to as the Breffni County. Kingspan Breffni is located on Park Lane to the south of Cavan town. Breffni Park hosted the first test in the 2006 Ladies' International Rules Series between Ireland and Australia. It also hosted the first test during the 2013 International Rules Series.

== History ==
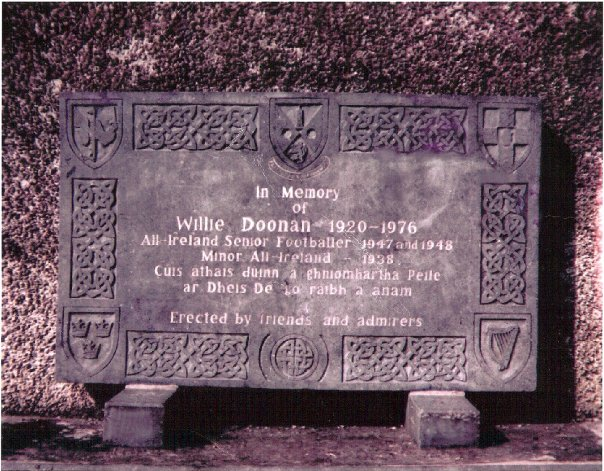
Memorial to Willie Doonan outside Breffni Park

Breffni Park was opened in 1923. The opening was attended by Eoin O'Duffy who gave a speech calling on the GAA to "bring together all sections of the Irish people" to "save the youth of Ireland from the sea of moral degradation into which they were travelling".

During the COVID-19 pandemic, Breffni Park was used as a drive-through test centre.

== Athletics ==
In June 2009, Breffni Park was the venue where the world record for the 12-hour continuous relay race was broken by 1,868 participants.

== Camogie ==
The 2009 Cavan Camogie Development Fun Day to promote the development of camogie at underage levels was held at Breffni Park on 7 June 2009.

== Gaelic football ==
Breffni Park regularly hosts matches in the Ulster Senior Football Championship. In the Ulster Senior Football Championship 2009, it hosted Cavan's unexpected 0–13 to 1–09 quarter-final defeat of Fermanagh. Critics had beforehand doubted Cavan's ability to win the match. The Belfast Telegraph described it as Fermanagh's "most inept championship performance for some time", saying Fermanagh were "gunned down".

Breffni Park has also hosted several matches at national level.

=== All-Ireland qualifying matches ===
Breffni Park has hosted a number of qualifiers for the All-Ireland Senior Football Championship.

The stadium hosted one game involving Cavan when they progressed to round four of the qualifiers for the All-Ireland Senior Football Championship 2005. The team entered the qualifiers in the second round where they beat Donegal by a score of 1–11 to 1–10 at the ground. Breffni Park also hosted the third round qualifying game between Monaghan and Louth which Monaghan won by 1–12 to 0–14.

The round three qualifier for the All-Ireland Senior Football Championship 2007 between Derry and Laois was played at Kingspan Breffni Park. Derry won by 1–18 to 2–11 to go through to the quarter-finals.

In the 2011 Football Championship it hosted 25 June round 1 qualifier between Louth and Meath, and Cavan versus Longford.

=== Allianz National League ===
In 2004, Breffni Park hosted a Division 1B match between Cavan and Armagh which Cavan won convincingly by 3–12 to 0–8. Armagh were winners of the All-Ireland Senior Football Championship 2002 and runners-up in the All-Ireland Senior Football Championship 2003.

Breffni Park was chosen to host the 2006 Division Two Final of the Allianz National League between Donegal and Louth. There was controversy when Donegal's manager Brian McIver was upset as he thought the game should have been played at Croke Park in Dublin. McIver said: "It defies logic and I think the sponsors might have something to say about it as well. It's very strange that the finals can suddenly be moved from Croke Park. [...] The National League is the second biggest competition in the GAA and the finals should be staged at Croke Park". The GAA claimed it was due to "the geographic considerations in respect of the four Division One semi-finalists". Donegal's semi-final defeat of Westmeath had also taken place at Breffni Park.

== Hurling ==
=== National Hurling League ===
Two of the National Hurling League Finals were played at Kingspan Breffni Park on 2 May 2009. These were the Division Three A Final between Meath and Kildare and the Division Four Final between Monaghan and Sligo.

== International rules football ==
Breffni Park hosted the first test in the 2006 Ladies' International Rules Series between Ireland and Australia. This was the first test between the two teams. Ireland beat Australia by 134–15. The venue also hosted the first test during the 2013 International Rules Series.

== See also ==
- List of Gaelic Athletic Association stadiums
- List of stadiums in Ireland by capacity
