= Alberta Footy Women's League =

- Current season, competition or edition: 2009 AFWL season
- Sport: Australian Football
- Founded: 2008
- No. of teams: 3
- Country: Canada
- Most recent champion(s): Hillhurst Nighthawks

The Alberta Footy Women's League (AFWL) is the largest women's Australian football league playing regular matches in North America. It is currently composed of teams from Calgary and Edmonton, Alberta, who play for the AFWL Premiership Cup.

The AFWL, along with the Ontario Australian Football League and North West Pacific Football League is a member of AFL Canada, the governing body for the sport in Canada. In 2008, the AFWL had around 90 senior players consisting of over 70 Canadian nationals.

== History ==
The league grew out of intra-club matches organized by the Calgary Kookaburras in 2007. A move was made the next season to formalize the league, and Calgary's players were drafted into two clubs based in inner-suburban Calgary - Hillhurst and Kensington.

The 2008 season ran from May to September and consisted of 12 rounds of matches. Hillhurst won the inaugural Premiership when they defeated Kensington 5.0.30 to 1.7.13 at Queen Elizabeth School on September 28, 2008.

The Edmonton Emus were founded in 2009 to become the AFWL's third team and bring women's footy to central Alberta for the first time. The 2009 season ran from May to September, featuring five rounds of double-header matches and a finals series. Hillhurst defeated Edmonton 12.9.81 to 0.0.0 in the Preliminary Final and went on to defeat Kensington in the Grand Final - 5.7.37 to 1.7.13 - at McNally High School (Edmonton) on September 19, 2009.

=== Premiers ===
Year	Premier	Runner-up
2008	Hillhurst Nighthawks	Kensington Kingfishers
2009	Hillhurst Nighthawks	Kensington Kingfishers
2010	To be determined	To be determined

== Clubs ==
=== Current clubs ===
Club	Community	Website	Formed	Premierships
Edmonton Emus	Garneau, Edmonton	Official site	2009	
Hillhurst Nighthawks	Hillhurst, Calgary	Official site	2008	2
Kensington Kingfishers	Kensington, Calgary	Official site	2008	

== See also ==
- List of Australian rules football women's leagues
