= List of women's Australian rules football leagues =

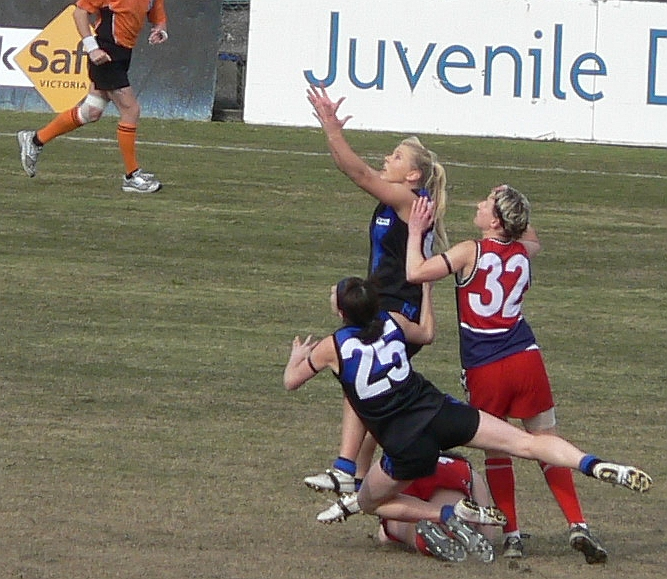
Women's Australian rules football.

List of Women's Australian rules football leagues around the world.

== Australia ==
=== National ===
- AFL Women's – semi-professional national competition beginning in 2017

=== Australian Capital Territory ===
- ACT Women's Australian Football League

=== New South Wales ===
- Sydney Women's AFL

=== Northern Territory ===
- Northern Territory Women's Premier League

=== Queensland ===
- QAFLW & QFAW
- AFL Capricornia Women's League
- AFL Townsville Women's League
- AFL Mackay Women's League
- Youth Girls Competition

=== South Australia ===
- SANFL Women's
- South Australian Women's Football League

=== Tasmania ===
- Australian rules football in Tasmania#Women.27s

=== Victoria ===
- VFL Women's
- Victorian Women's Football League
- AFL South East
- AFL Goldfields
- AFL Central Vic/AFL Goulburn Murray
- AFL Gippsland
- Northern Football League
- Southern Football Netball League
- Eastern Football League
- Western Region Football League
- Essendon District Football League
- Victorian Amateur Football Association
- AFL Barwon Women's Football

=== Western Australia ===
- WAFL Women's
- West Australian Women's Football League
- South West Football League (women's division)

== Argentina ==
- Women's Footy Argentina

== Canada ==
- Alberta Footy Women's League
- AFL Ontario

== Japan ==
- AFL Japan Official website
- Tokyo Open League
- Japan Osaka Australian Football League

== New Zealand ==
- Women's Footy NZ

== Papua New Guinea ==
- AFL PNG Official AFL PNG website

== South Africa ==
- Women's AFL South Africa

== United States of America ==
- United States Australian Football League Official Website
- Women's Footy News

== United Kingdom ==
- AFL London Official Website
- Oxford Australian Rules Football Club Official Website
