= Lauren Tesoriero =

Australian rules footballer

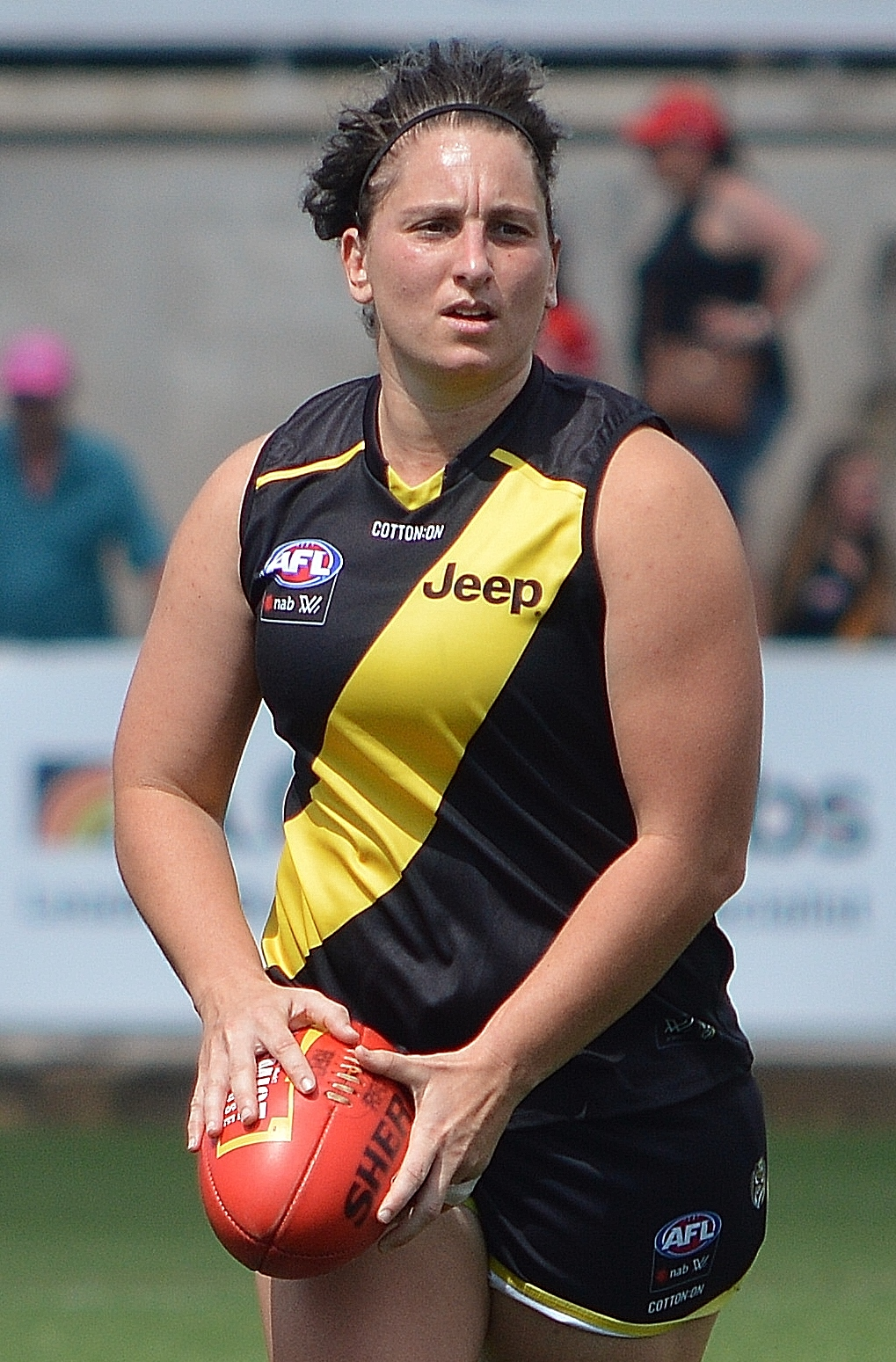
- Tesoriero with Richmond in February 2020

Personal information
- Full name: Lauren Tesoriero
- Born: 9 October 1986 (age 40); Melbourne, Victoria, Australia
- Original team: Eastern Devils (VFLW)
- Draft: No. 107, 2016 national draft No. 96, 2019 national draft
- Debut: Round 1, 2017, Collingwood vs. Carlton, at Ikon Park
- Height: 170 cm (5 ft 7 in)
- Position: Midfielder

Playing career^{1}
Years	Club	Games (Goals)
2017–2018	Collingwood	11 (1)
2020	Richmond	4 (0)
Total		15 (1)

International team honours
Years	Team	Games (Goals)
2006	Australia	
- ^{1} Playing statistics correct to the end of 2020 season.

Career highlights
- Inaugural Collingwood AFLW team: 2017; Inaugural Richmond AFLW team: 2020

Lauren Tesoriero (born 9 October 1986) is a retired Australian rules footballer who played for the Richmond Football Club in the AFL Women's competition (AFLW). She previously played 11 matches over a two-year tenure with Collingwood.

== Early life and state-league football ==
Tesoriero grew up in the Melbourne suburb of Mount Evelyn, learning to play football in the backyard with her brothers. She helped out at the Mount Evelyn Football Club with activities like boundary umpiring and running water, but didn't play since her parents didn't allow her. A family friend convinced her parents to let her play the last two games of the season with the under-10 boys and they were the only games they won that season. Due to lack of girl's youth teams in football, Tesoriero started playing basketball and netball. She represented the Mount Evelyn Netball Club and later played for the North East Blaze in the Victorian Netball League.

In 2005, at the age of 18, Tesoriero started playing senior football at Yarra Valley Cougars. A year later she was selected to represent the Victorian state football team. She was also a member of the Australia women's international rules football team that played against Ireland in the 2006 Ladies' International Rules Series.

She then joined VFLW club Eastern Devils. In 2012 she suffered an ACL tear while training with the Devils, but continued to play on the damaged knee for the rest of the year without surgery, instead resting the injury for three months before returning and then another six months before having surgery to fully repair the injury. In 2016 she averaged a goal per game for the club.

While still playing state-league football and following her ACL injury, Tesoriero started coaching netball, including for two years at Yea and a year at Mansfield.

Tesoriero has also played football outside of Australia, representing Wandsworth Demons in the AFL London competition.

== AFL Women's career ==
=== Collingwood (2017–2018) ===
Tesoriero was selected by Collingwood with pick 107, and she described it as a "second wind", after considering retiring. She made her debut in round 1, 2017, in the inaugural AFLW match at Ikon Park against Carlton.

Collingwood re-signed Tesoriero for the 2018 season during the trade period in May 2017.

In June 2018, Tesoriero was delisted by Collingwood.

Following her delisting, Tesoriero joined Richmond for the 2018 VFL Women's season and began volunteering as a women's recruiter and scout the club. In October 2018 she joined Richmond as a full time AFLW recruiter and accepted a role as a playing assistant coach for the 2019 VFLW season. She suffered an ACL tear in her left knee while playing a match against NT Thunder in June 2019, but opted against a full surgical repair in favour of the quicker non-surgical return she had once before successfully completed while playing state-league football in 2012.

=== Richmond (2020) ===
Tesoriero was drafted by Richmond with the club's final selection and 96th pick overall in the 2019 AFL Women's draft. She made her Richmond debut against Carlton at Ikon Park in the opening round of the 2020 season. She announced her retirement on 25 March 2020.

== Statistics ==
Statistics are correct to the end of the 2020 season.

Legend
G	Goals	K	Kicks	D	Disposals	T	Tackles
B	Behinds	H	Handballs	M	Marks

Season	Team	No.	Games	Totals							Averages (per game)						
Season	Team	No.	Games	G	B	K	H	D	M	T	G	B	K	H	D	M	T
2017	Collingwood	7	5	0	1	24	22	46	7	18	0.0	0.2	4.8	4.4	9.2	1.4	3.6
2018	Collingwood	7	6	1	1	22	23	45	13	16	0.2	0.2	3.7	3.8	7.5	2.2	2.7
2019	—	—	—	—	—	—	—	—	—	—	—	—	—	—	—	—	—
2020	Richmond	7	4	0	0	9	12	21	3	9	0.0	0.0	2.3	3.0	5.3	0.8	2.3
Career			15	1	2	55	57	112	23	43	0.1	0.1	3.7	3.8	7.5	1.5	2.9
