= Australian Capital Territory Women's Australian Football League =

- Founded: 1998
- Competitors: Eastlake Demons; Tuggeranong Thunder; ADFA Rams; Belconnen Magpies; Ainslie Kangaroos; Riverina Lions; ANU Griffins

The Australian Capital Territory Women's Australian Football League (ACTWAFL) is the governing body of the sport in the Australian Capital Territory.

== Clubs ==
- Eastlake Demons
- Tuggeranong Thunder
- ADFA Rams
- Belconnen Magpies
- Ainslie Kangaroos
- Riverina Lions (based in Wagga Wagga)
- ANU Griffins

== See also ==
- List of Australian rules football women's leagues
