= Meg Hutchins =

Australian rules footballer (born 1982)

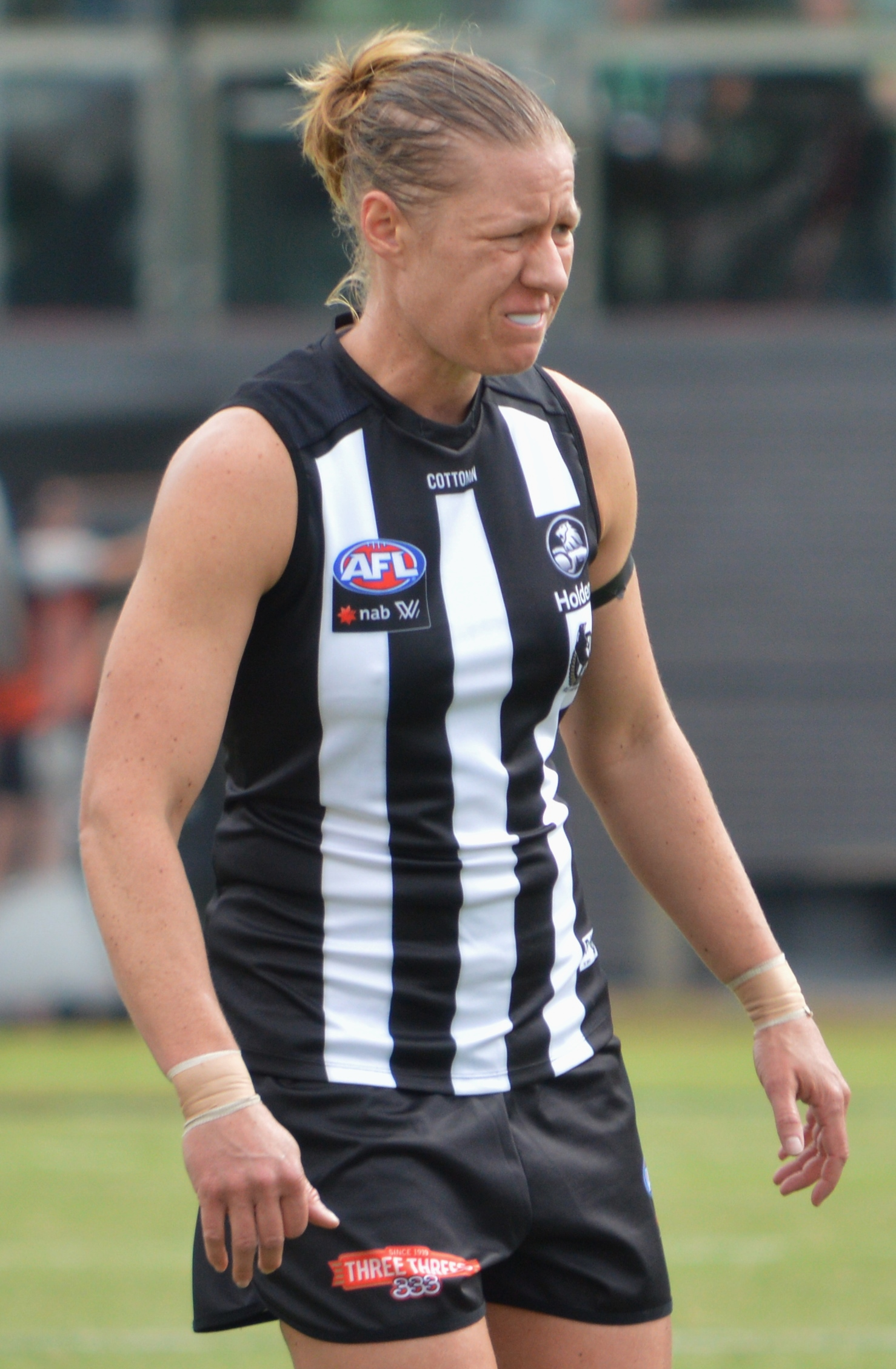
- Hutchins playing for Collingwood in February 2018

Personal information
- Full name: Meg Hutchins
- Born: 3 February 1982 (age 44); Melbourne, Victoria
- Original team: Eastern Devils (VFLW)
- Draft: Priority signing 2016: Collingwood
- Debut: Round 1, 2017, Collingwood vs. Carlton, at IKON Park
- Height: 174 cm (5 ft 9 in)
- Position: Defender

Playing career^{1}
Years	Club	Games (Goals)
2017–2018	Collingwood	12 (3)

International team honours
Years	Team	Games (Goals)
2006	Australia	
- ^{1} Playing statistics correct to the end of the 2018 season.

Career highlights
- Helen Lambert Medal: 2004; 6× All-Australian: 2004, 2005, 2006, 2007, 2009, 2011; Eastern Devils leading goalkicker: 2005, 2006, 2007, 2008; VWFL Best First Year Player: 2003

Meg Hutchins (born 3 February 1982) is an Australian rules footballer who played for the Collingwood Football Club in the AFL Women's (AFLW).

== Early life and state football ==
In her early teens, she reverted to other sports when football was no longer an option due to league rules and a lack of girls' sides. She played hockey and basketball before becoming an elite rower. At the age of 21, she returned to football with VWFL club Eastern Devils, and was their leading goalkicker between 2005 and 2008, before switching to defence and playing as a key defender for eight seasons. She represented Western Bulldogs in four exhibition matches. While playing for them against Western Australia in early June at Etihad Stadium, she tore the lateral meniscus in her right knee, leading to her not playing for the rest of the season.

During her time at the Eastern Devils, Hutchins was also co-captain of the club, won the Helen Lambert Medal as the VWFL best and fairest, and was selected as All-Australian six times.

In May 2017, after returning to the Eastern Devils for the off-season between the 2017 and 2018 AFLW seasons, Hutchins made her 200th appearance for the club.

== AFL Women's career ==
"I've absolutely loved every minute at the Bulldogs, and the people I've met. I'm in this position now, because of the football I've played, and they've given me the opportunity to play that football. I don't want to do the wrong thing by them, but they understand that if I'm putting in all this work to put together a football program at Collingwood, then it would be a bit of a conflict of interest."

— Hutchins speaking in 2016 about playing for Collingwood.

In March 2016, Collingwood chief executive officer Gary Pert was approached by Hutchins, who offered the benefit of her experience and acted as an advisor to the Collingwood board, supervising the recruitment and development of players, coaches and staff. Collingwood created a job for her, named Women's Football Operations Manager.

In August 2016, Hutchins joined Collingwood as a priority pick, fulfilling her childhood dream of playing for Collingwood in the AFL. She made her debut in round 1, 2017, in the inaugural AFLW match at IKON Park against Carlton. Following the match, she said that Collingwood were "outworked" by Carlton with them winning the handballs count. She also spoke of the mixed emotions, as on one hand, as a competitor, she was bitterly disappointed with the loss but on the other hand, as a female footballer, she was incredibly proud of what begun.

Collingwood re-signed Hutchins for the 2018 season during the trade period in May 2017.

She was delisted by Collingwood at the end of the 2018 season after the club announced they would not give her a contract for the 2019 season, she subsequently joined Hawthorn's Victorian Football League Women's team. Hutchins announced her retirement as an AFLW player on 12 June 2018, but will continue with Hawthorn in the VFLW.

== International rules football ==
Hutchins was a member of the Australia women's international rules football team that played against Ireland in the 2006 Ladies' International Rules Series.

== Statistics ==
Statistics are correct to the end of the 2018 season.

Legend
G	Goals	K	Kicks	D	Disposals	T	Tackles
B	Behinds	H	Handballs	M	Marks

Season	Team	No.	Games	Totals							Averages (per game)							Votes
Season	Team	No.	Games	G	B	K	H	D	M	T	G	B	K	H	D	M	T	Votes
2017	Collingwood	25	7	0	0	57	13	70	16	8	0.0	0.0	8.1	1.9	10.0	2.3	1.1	1
2018	Collingwood	25	5	3	1	22	9	31	8	6	0.6	0.2	4.4	1.8	6.2	1.6	1.2	0
Career			12	3	1	79	22	101	24	14	0.3	0.1	6.6	1.8	8.4	2.0	1.2	1
