= Western Australia GAA =

Gaelic games governing body in Australia

- Dominant sport: Gaelic football

Western Australia GAA (WAGAA) was established in 1975. It is the ruling body for Gaelic football and hurling in the Western Australia region of Australia. The AGAA is affiliated to the Australasia GAA.

The WAGAA runs both Men's and Women's Football matches over the summer at Gaelic Park in Australia. The competition was previously played over winter, however clashes with other sports deemed it necessary to move to a summer competition to attract more players.

State Representative Teams are sent to the Australasian Championships every year with Men's senior and Minors and Women's Teams competing.

== Clubs ==
- Bunbury GFC
- Greenwood GFC
- Morley Gaels GFC - Website
- Southern Districts
- St Finbarr's Gaelic Football Club - Website
- Western Shamrocks
