= Joanne Butland =

Australian footballer (born 1979)

Personal information
- Full name: Joanne Butland
- Date of birth: 24 November 1978 (age 47)
- Place of birth: Australia
- Height: 6 ft 0 in (1.83 m)
- Position: Goalkeeper

Senior career*
Years	Team	Apps	(Gls)
- QAS Sting
- Canberra Eclipse

International career^{‡}
1999–2000	Australia	4	(0)
- * Club domestic league appearances and goals as of 16 February 2010 ‡ National team caps and goals as of 16 February 2010

Joanne Butland (born 24 November 1978) is an Australian who has played association football, Australian rules football and international rules football.

== Association football ==
=== Club career ===
Butland played in the Women's National Soccer League for Canberra Eclipse and QAS Sting.

=== International career ===
She played four matches for the Australia women's national association football team in 1999 and 2000.

== Australian rules football ==
After changing sports at the suggestion of her sister-in-law she soon became a star for North Cairns in the AFL Cairns Women's League. She was the league best and fairest four times in five years between 2003 and 2008. She was selected in the All-Australian team between 2005 and 2007 and also in 2011 being named All-Australian Captain in 2007.. She was, as of 2009, player-coach of North Cairns.

== International rules football ==
Butland was a member of the Australia women's international rules football team that played against Ireland in the 2006 Ladies' International Rules Series.
