= Michelle Dench =

Australian sportswoman

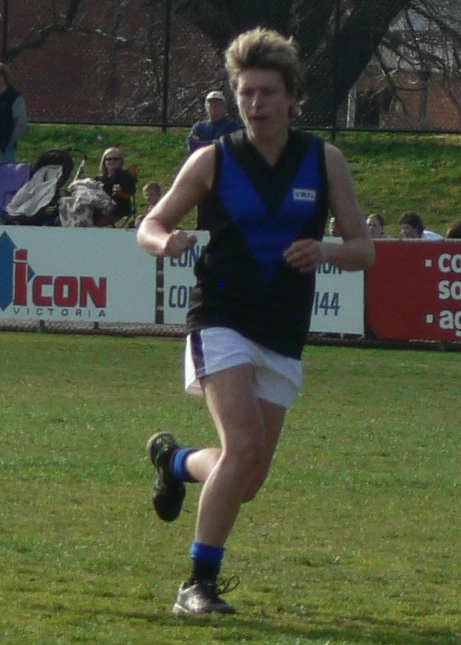
Michelle Dench playing for the Mugars

Michelle Dench is an Australian sportswoman who played women's Australian rules football and basketball in the Women's National Basketball League.

Dench played for the Melbourne University Mugars in the Victorian Women's Football League. She was a member of the Australia women's international rules football team that played against Ireland in the 2006 Ladies' International Rules Series.

She has been an All-Australian and the AFL Women's National Championships in 1998, 1999, 2000, 2001, 2002, 2003, 2004, 2005, 2006 & 2007.

She is the daughter of North Melbourne Football Club great David Dench.

She retired at the end of the 2009 season.
