= Penny Cula-Reid =

Australian rules footballer

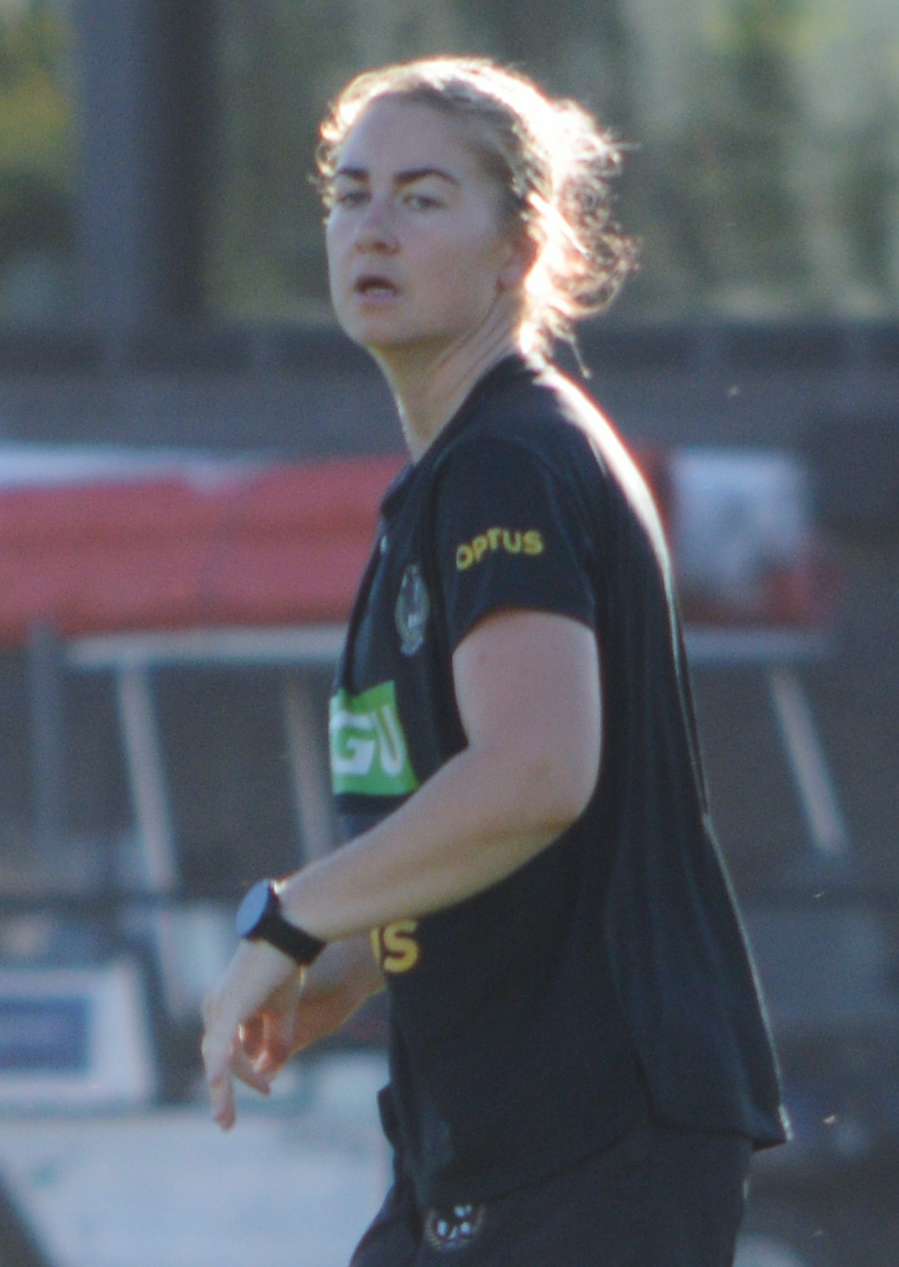
- Cula-Reid in January 2018

Personal information
- Born: 2 February 1988 (age 38); Clayton
- Original team: St Kilda Sharks (VFL Women's)
- Draft: No. 102, 2016 AFL Women's draft
- Debut: Round 2, 2017, Collingwood vs. Melbourne, at Ikon Park
- Height: 164 cm (5 ft 5 in)
- Position: Defender

Club information
- Current club: Collingwood
- Number: 3

Playing career^{1}
Years	Club	Games (Goals)
2017	Collingwood	2 (0)

International team honours
Years	Team	Games (Goals)
2006	Australia	

Coaching career^{3}
Years	Club	Games (W–L–D)
2018–2019	Collingwood (VFLW)	(0–0–0)
2020–	Williamstown FC (VFLW)	(0–0–0)
- ^{1} Playing statistics correct to the end of 2017.^{3} Coaching statistics correct as of 2017.

Career highlights
- 2018 VFLW Coach of the Year; 2019 Premiership Coach; 2019 Inducted into the National Sports Museum

Penny Cula-Reid (born 2 February 1988) is an Australian rules footballer who played for the Collingwood Football Club in the AFL Women's competition.

Prior to being signed for the national competition, she was a multiple premiership player in the Victorian Women's Football League and club captain for the St Kilda Sharks; she also represented Victoria at the under-19 national championships. She has also played cricket in the Victorian second XI and gridiron with the Victorian Maidens in the Lingerie Football League.

Cula-Reid was a member of the Australia women's international rules football team that played against Ireland in the 2006 Ladies' International Rules Series.

She was involved in a sex discrimination case when she and two other girls challenged the Moorabbin Saints Junior Football League and Football Victoria Ltd's rules that forbade girls from playing in mixed-sex teams after the age of twelve. The case resulted in a landmark 2004 ruling that outlawed sex discrimination for children under 14, meaning girls could now play in mixed-sex teams up to the under-14s instead of the under-12s, though this still prevented Cula-Reid from playing in mixed-sex teams. She has been credited with "effectively forcing" AFL Victoria to create a youth girls competition. A documentary, Even Girls Play Footy, was made about the case.

She played two games in the 2017 season.

After being delisted, Cula-Reid was appointed senior coach of Collingwood's VFLW team ahead of the 2018 season. She led the Magpies to the minor premiership, and was named VFLW Coach of the Year.

== See also ==
- List of Caulfield Grammar School people
