= Shannon McFerran =

Australian rules footballer

Personal information
- Born: 13 June 1979 (age 47)
- Height: 168 cm (5 ft 6 in)
- Position: Rover

Playing career
Years	Club	Games (Goals)
- St Albans Spurs; Deer Park Lions; St Kilda Sharks; Gisborne Bulldogs

Representative team honours
Years	Team	Games (Goals)
1998 - 2011	Victoria	

International team honours
2006	Australia	

Coaching career
Years	Club	Games (W–L–D)
7	St Albans Youth Girls; St Kilda Sharks; Collingwood AFLW (development coach); Carlton VFLW head coach Carlton AFLW Assistant coach Keilor Women's Senior Coach	

Career highlights
- Premierships 2004, 2012, 2016 (Deer Park)

Shannon McFerran (born 13 June 1979) is an Australian rules football player in the Victorian Women's Football League. She currently plays at Gisborne Bulldogs Women's Football Club.

== Playing career ==
McFerran began playing for a St Albans FC boys' team at the age of nine. She played at St Albans with the boys until 12 years of age as girls could not play with boys after age 12. She went into umpiring and umpired in the FDFL now WRFL umpiring the boundary before taking up the field. At 17, McFerran joined the Sunshine YCW Spurs Women's football team. Sunshine moved to St Albans in 2000. She became captain of the Spurs in 2005. McFerran was part of the 2004 and 2011 premierships at St Albans Spurs.

In June 2007, McFerran was one of two Victorian Women's Football League representatives in the E. J. Whitten legends match where she played alongside former Australian Football League players such as Scott Cummings, Nick Holland, Mick Martyn and Nicky Winmar.

In March 2009, she was diagnosed with an acoustic neuroma, a tumour in the canal that connects the brain and ear. Despite losing hearing in her left ear, she played out the 2009 season. She was named All - Australian captain and was best on ground in the grand final at the Australian AFL championships, she also won the Debbie Lee medal for player of the championships.

After surgery to remove the tumour in December 2009, she sat out the 2010 season. Returning after a season on the sidelines, McFerran played her 200th VWFL match for St Albans in May 2011.

She has been named as best and fairest player (Helen Lambert medal) in the Victorian women's league five times and is a 10 time best and fairest club winner.

She has represented Victoria 12 times, captained Victoria a number of times and was All Australian captain 2009 and 2011. She retired from playing at St Kilda Sharks and took on the role of head coach in 2015. In 2009, she featured in Women's Health magazine and was most recently named in the top 100 Sport women in Australia. Following that, she was a development coach at Collingwood in the AFLW, and later the inaugural head coach of the Carlton VFL Women's team and assistant coach in Carlton's AFL Women's team.

== International rules football ==
McFerran was a member of the Australia women's international rules football team that played against Ireland in the 2006 Ladies' International Rules Series.
