= Ireland women's national international rules football team =

Ireland
- Emblem
- Union: Ladies' Gaelic Football Association
- Head coach: Jarlath Burns (2006)
- Captain: Sarah O'Connor (2006)
- Home stadium: Breffni Park; Parnell Park
First colours

First international
- (Republic of Ireland) Ireland 134–15 Australia (2006, 1st Test)

Biggest win
- (Republic of Ireland) Ireland 134–15 Australia (2006, 1st Test)

The Ireland women's international rules football team was organised by the Ladies' Gaelic Football Association and represented Ireland in the 2006 Ladies' International Rules Series against Australia. As of 2019, this is the only series the team has played. Ireland won the series, prevailing in the first test at Breffni Park by 134–15 and the second test at Parnell Park by 39–18.

== 2006 Series ==
=== First test ===
31 October 2006	Ireland	134;15	Australia	Breffni Park, Cavan
16:00	6.26.16; Mary Sheridan (1-4-0; 18); Geraldine Doherty (1-3-0; 15); Cora Staunton (1-2-3; 15); Sarah O'Connor (0-3-4; 13); Dympna O'Brien (1-2-0; 12); Brianne Leahy (1-1-0; 9); Mairead Morrissey (1-1-0; 9); Michaela Downey (0-2-1; 7); Patricia Gleeson (0-1-3; 6); Lorraine Muckian (0-2-0; 6); Sinéad Aherne (0-1-1; 4); Bronagh Sheridan (0-1-1; 4); Aoibheann Daly (0-1-0; 3); Bronagh O'Donnell (0-1-0; 3); Caroline O'Hanlon (0-1-0; 3); Alma O'Donnell (0-0-1; 1); A.M. McDonough (0-0-1; 1); Angela Walsh (0-0-1; 1)		1.2.3; K. Zacharopoulos (1-0-1; 7); Michelle Dench (0-1-0; 3); Shelly Matcham (0-1-0; 3); Shannon McFerran (0-0-1; 1); Talei Owen (0-0-1; 1)	Referee: Eugene O'Hare; Cony Vardouniotis

=== Second test ===
4 November 2006	Ireland	39;18	Australia	Parnell Park, Dublin
19:15	3.5.6		0.4.6	Referee: Declan Staunton

== 2006 squad ==
In preparation for the 2006 Series, the LGFA and the team manager, Jarlath Burns, held a series of trials and camps in Mullingar, Cork and Armagh during September and early October. The final squad included eight players who had played in the 2006 All-Ireland Senior Ladies' Football Championship final. 22 of the 30 strong squad were nominated for the 2006 All Star Awards. The squad featured representatives from 14 different GAA counties and included five senior inter-county captains, including Juliet Murphy (Cork), Bronagh O'Donnell (Armagh), Cora Staunton (Mayo), Mary Sheridan (Meath) and Mary O'Donnell (Waterford).

Manager
Jarlath Burns (Armagh)
First test starting XV
Clíodhna O'Connor (Dublin); Rena Buckley (Cork), Angela Walsh (Cork), Caoimhe Marley (Armagh), Aoibheann Daly (Galway), Norita Kelly (Cork), Patricia Fogarty (Laois); Patricia Gleeson (Galway), Mary O'Donnell (Waterford); Sarah O'Connor (Kerry) (c), Bronagh Sheridan (Cavan), Brianna Leahy (Kildare), Geraldine Doherty (Meath), Mairead Morrissey (Tipperary), Cora Staunton (Mayo).
Interchange players
Sinéad Aherne (Dublin), Micheala Downey (Down), Christina Heffernan (Mayo), Anne Marie McDonagh (Galway), Lorraine Muckian (Laois), Alma O'Donnell (Armagh), Dympna O'Brien (Limerick), Bronagh O'Donnell (Armagh), Caroline O'Hanlon (Armagh)
Mary Sheridan (Meath).
Squad players
Juliet Murphy (Cork), Una Carroll (Galway), Grainne Ni Flathartha (Kerry), Sinéad Dooley (Meath), Jackie Shields (Meath).
