= 2017 Geelong Football Club season =

Geelong Football Club
2017 season
- President: Colin Carter
- Coach: Chris Scott (7th season)
- Captains: Joel Selwood (6th season)
- Home ground: Simonds Stadium
- AFL season: 2nd
- Finals series: Preliminary final
- Best and Fairest: Patrick Dangerfield (2nd)
- Leading goalkicker: Tom Hawkins (51)
- Highest home attendance: 70,345 vs.Hawthorn (15 July, Round 17)
- Lowest home attendance: 24,909 vs. Port Adelaide (25 May, Round 10)
- Average home attendance: 36,819

The 2017 Geelong Football Club season was the club's 118th season of senior competition in the Australian Football League (AFL). The club also fielded its reserves team in the Victorian Football League (VFL) for the 18th season. It was also the first time the club fielded a women's team, with the club joining the VFL Women's competition.

== Overview ==
After retiring as a player at the end of the 2016 season, Corey Enright joined the coaching panel as an assistant coach, replacing Blake Caracella who moved to a senior assistant coaching role with Richmond. Former Western Bulldogs player Brad Johnson also had a short-term specialist coaching role working with the club's forwards during the preseason.

== Season summary ==
=== Regular season ===
Geelong's 2017 AFL season fixture
Round	Date and local time	Opponent	Home	Away	Result	Venue	Attendance	Ladder position
Round	Date and local time	Opponent	Scores^{[a]}			Venue	Attendance	Ladder position
1	Sunday, 26 March (4:40 pm)	Fremantle	10.13 (73)	18.7 (115)	Won by 42 points	Domain Stadium [A]	34,638	2nd
2	Sunday, 2 April (1:10 pm)	North Melbourne	17.10 (112)	17.9 (111)	Won by 1 point	Etihad Stadium [H]	30,917	7th
3	Saturday, 8 April (4:35 pm)	Melbourne	20.6 (126)	13.19 (97)	Won by 29 points	Etihad Stadium [H]	29,733	3rd
4	Monday, 17 April (3:20 pm)	Hawthorn	6.12 (48)	20.14 (134)	Won by 86 points	MCG [A]	62,360	1st
5	Sunday, 23 April (3:20 pm)	St Kilda	13.10 (88)	19.12 (126)	Won by 38 points	Etihad Stadium [A]	33,884	2nd
6	Sunday, 30 April (3:20 pm)	Collingwood	11.12 (72)	15.17 (107)	Lost by 29 points	MCG [H]	46,457	3rd
7	Saturday, 6 May (7:25 pm)	Gold Coast	18.16 (124)	15.9 (99)	Lost by 25 points	Metricon Stadium [A]	13,648	3rd
8	Saturday, 13 May (7:25 pm)	Essendon	17.8 (110)	13.15 (93)	Lost by 17 points	MCG [A]	57,172	5th
9	Friday, 19 May (7:50 pm)	Western Bulldogs	16.8 (104)	12.9 (81)	Won by 23 points	Simonds Stadium [H]	30,275	3rd
10	Thursday, 25 May (7:20 pm)	Port Adelaide	11.15 (81)	11.13 (79)	Won by 2 points	Simonds Stadium [H]	24,909	3rd
11	Friday, 2 June (7:50 pm)	Adelaide	13.18 (96)	10.14 (74)	Won by 22 points	Simonds Stadium [H]	30,468	3rd
12	Bye							3rd
13	Thursday, 15 June (6:10 pm)	West Coast	11.17 (83)	10.10 (70)	Lost by 13 points	Domain Stadium [A]	35,719	3rd
14	Sunday, 25 June (1:10 pm)	Fremantle	10.14 (74)	11.6 (72)	Won by 2 points	Simonds Stadium [H]	29,928	3rd
15	Saturday, 1 July (7:25 pm)	Greater Western Sydney	10.8 (68)	10.8 (68)	Match drawn	Spotless Stadium [A]	15,007	3rd
16	Saturday, 8 July (7:25 pm)	Brisbane Lions	11.12 (78)	25.13 (163)	Won by 85 points	The Gabba [A]	18,769	3rd
17	Saturday, 15 July (1:45 pm)	Hawthorn	13.10 (88)	12.13 (85)	Won by 3 points	MCG [H]	70,345	2nd
18	Friday, 21 July (7:20 pm)	Adelaide	13.13 (91)	10.10 (70)	Lost by 21 points	Adelaide Oval [A]	50,464	2nd
19	Saturday, 29 July (7:25 pm)	Carlton	8.10 (58)	18.15 (123)	Won by 65 points	Etihad Stadium [A]	35,460	2nd
20	Friday, 4 August (7:50 pm)	Sydney	8.13 (61)	16.11 (107)	Lost by 46 points	Simonds Stadium [H]	30,833	4th
21	Saturday, 12 August (2:10 pm)	Richmond	11.14 (80)	9.12 (66)	Won by 14 points	Simonds Stadium [H]	32,266	3rd
22	Saturday, 19 August (2:10 pm)	Collingwood	9.5 (59)	10.10 (70)	Won by 11 points	MCG [A]	47,889	3rd
23	Sunday, 27 August (TBC)	Greater Western Sydney	15.13 (103)	8.11 (59)	Won by 44 points	Simonds Stadium [H]	30,087	2nd

==== Ladder ====
Pos	Team	Pld	W	L	D	PF	PA	PP	Pts	Qualification
1	Adelaide	22	15	6	1	2415	1776	136.0	62	2017 finals
2	Geelong	22	15	6	1	2134	1818	117.4	62	2017 finals
3	Richmond (P)	22	15	7	0	1992	1684	118.3	60	2017 finals
4	Greater Western Sydney	22	14	6	2	2081	1812	114.8	60	2017 finals
5	Port Adelaide	22	14	8	0	2168	1671	129.7	56	2017 finals
6	Sydney	22	14	8	0	2093	1651	126.8	56	2017 finals
7	Essendon	22	12	10	0	2135	2004	106.5	48	2017 finals
8	West Coast	22	12	10	0	1964	1858	105.7	48	2017 finals
9	Melbourne	22	12	10	0	2035	1934	105.2	48	
10	Western Bulldogs	22	11	11	0	1857	1913	97.1	44	
11	St Kilda	22	11	11	0	1925	1986	96.9	44	
12	Hawthorn	22	10	11	1	1864	2055	90.7	42	
13	Collingwood	22	9	12	1	1944	1963	99.0	38	
14	Fremantle	22	8	14	0	1607	2160	74.4	32	
15	North Melbourne	22	6	16	0	1983	2264	87.6	24	
16	Carlton	22	6	16	0	1594	2038	78.2	24	
17	Gold Coast	22	6	16	0	1756	2311	76.0	24	
18	Brisbane Lions	22	5	17	0	1877	2526	74.3	20	

Source: AFL
Rules for classification: 1) points; 2) percentage; 3) number of points for.
(P) Premiers

== Honours ==
=== Milestones ===
- Round 1 - Brandan Parfitt (AFL debut), Tom Stewart (AFL debut), Zach Tuohy (Geelong debut)
- Round 3 - James Parsons (AFL debut)
- Round 5 - Aaron Black (Geelong debut)

=== Others ===
- Round 3 - Brandan Parfitt (2017 AFL Rising Star nomination)

== VFL Women's team ==
Geelong Football Club
2017 VFLW season
- President: Colin Carter
- Coach: Paul Hood (1st season)
- Captains: Rebecca Goring (1st season)
- Home ground: Simonds Stadium; Anthony Costa Oval; Deakin University, Waurn Ponds
- VFLW: 5th
- VFLW Best & Fairest: Lily Mithen
- Leading goalkicker: Kate Darby (19)

2017 was the first season of women's Australian rules football contested by the Geelong Football Club, with the club competing in the second season of the VFL Women's competition, after failing to secure a licence to compete in the inaugural AFL Women's competition that began in 2017.

=== Background ===
The first season of the VFL Women's (VFLW) league was held in 2016, and consisted of ten teams from the now-defunct Victorian Women's Football League.

In October 2016, Geelong announced that they would be taking over the licence to operate a VFL Women's team, replacing the Geelong Magpies who had competed in the 2016 season.

=== Season summary ===
Paul Hood was appointed the club's inaugural VFLW coach, having previously coached Geelong's VFL team in 2015. Rebecca Goring was appointed captain, with Maddie Boyd and Lily Mithen named as co-vice captains. Mithen won the club's VFLW best and fairest award for the season. The club would finish the season fifth on the ladder, not qualifying for the finals.

=== Results ===
Key
H	Home game
A	Away game

Table of season results
Round	Date	Result	Score			Opponent	Score			Ground	
Round	Date	Result	G	B	T	Opponent	G	B	T	Ground	
1	6 May	Won	9	4	58	Box Hill Hawks	0	2	2	Simonds Stadium	H
2	13 May	Won	11	7	73	Seaford	4	2	26	Shell Road Reserve, Ocean Grove	H
3	28 May	Won	3	5	23	Cranbourne	2	4	16	Frenken Homes Oval (Casey Fields No 2)	A
4	4 June	Lost	2	3	15	Darebin	11	11	77	Plenty War Memorial Park	A
5	18 June	Lost	3	2	20	VU Western Spurs	7	5	47	Henry Turner Memorial Reserve, Footscray	A
6	25 June	Lost	3	2	20	Melbourne University	8	8	56	Anthony Costa Oval, Geelong	H
7	2 July	Lost	4	0	24	St Kilda Sharks	4	8	32	Deakin University, Waurn Ponds	H
8	29 June	Won	9	8	62	Seaford	2	3	15	R F Miles Recreation Reserve, Seaford	A
9	16 July	Won	11	6	72	Cranbourne	4	2	26	Osborne Park, North Geelong	H
10	29 July	Lost	1	1	7	Darebin	2	8	20	IKON Park	A
11	5 August	Won	4	5	29	Box Hill Hawks	2	3	15	Box Hill City Oval	A
12	12 August	Won	6	5	41	VU Western Spurs	1	3	9	Anthony Costa Oval, Geelong	H
13	20 August	Won	11	8	74	Eastern Devils	5	5	35	Deakin University, Waurn Ponds	H
14	27 August	Lost	4	3	27	Eastern Devils	8	7	55	Mulgrave Reserve	A

=== Ladder ===
Pos	Team	Pld	W	L	D	PF	PA	PP	Pts	Qualification
1	Darebin (P)	14	12	2	0	873	319	273.7	48	Finals series
2	Diamond Creek	14	12	2	0	803	421	190.7	48	Finals series
3	Melbourne University	14	10	4	0	755	414	182.4	40	Finals series
4	St Kilda Sharks	14	10	4	0	749	493	151.9	40	Finals series
5	Geelong Cats	14	8	6	0	545	431	126.5	32	
6	Western Spurs	14	7	7	0	563	584	96.4	28	
7	Eastern Devils	14	5	9	0	684	708	96.6	20	
8	Box Hill	14	3	11	0	382	718	53.2	12	
9	Cranbourne	14	3	11	0	298	889	33.5	12	
10	Seaford	14	0	14	0	260	935	27.8	0	

Source: SportsTG
Rules for classification: 1) points; 2) percentage; 3) number of points for.
(P) Premiers

=== Awards ===
- Best & Fairest: Lily Mithen
- VFL Women’s Team of the Year: Richelle Cranston (Wing), Lily Mithen (Half forward)

== Notes ==
Key

- H Home match.
- A Away match.

Notes

- **^{a}** Geelong's scores are indicated in **bold** font.
