= 2017 VFL Women's season =

Second VFLW season

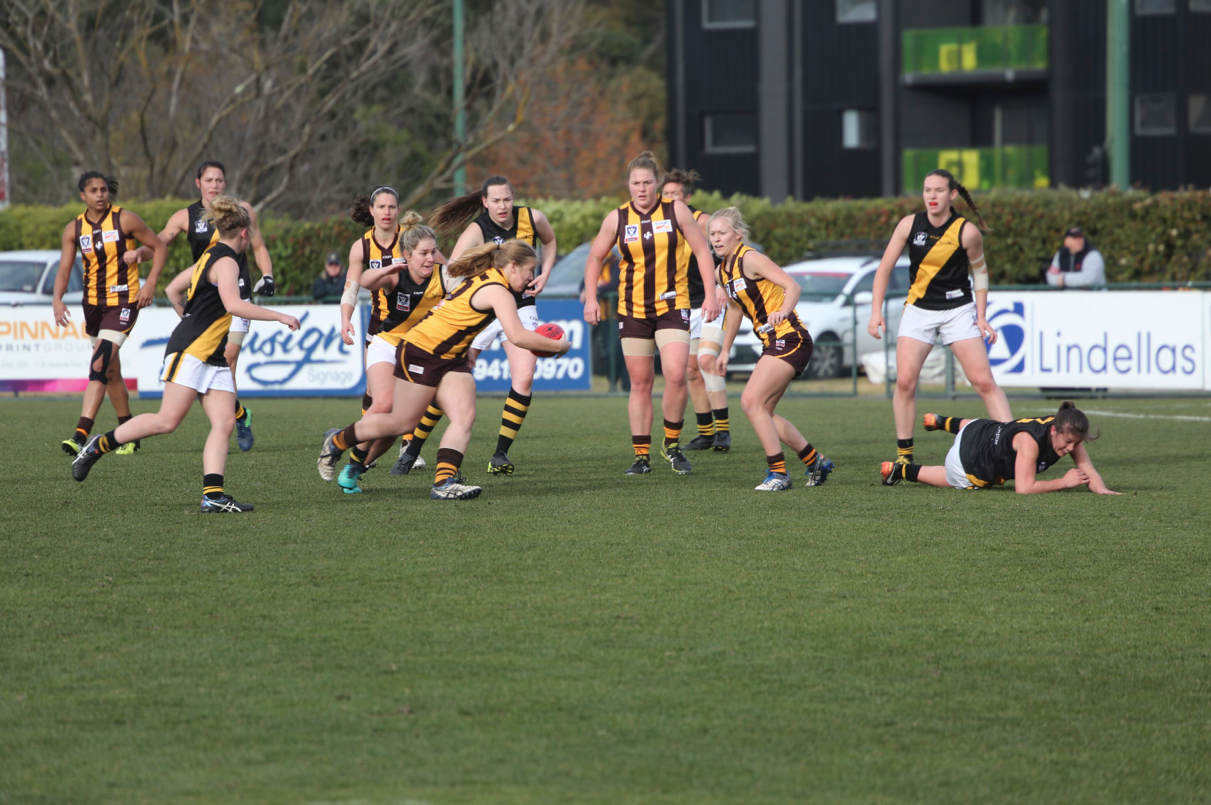
- Box Hill plays Seaford at home in round 9
- Teams: 10
- Premiers: Darebin; 2nd premiership
- Minor premiers: Darebin; 2nd minor premiership
- Best and fairest: Katie Brennan; Darebin (21 votes)
- Leading goalkicker: Katie Brennan; Darebin; Chloe Molloy; Diamond Creek (32 goals each)

The 2017 VFL Women's season was the second season of the VFL Women's (VFLW). The season commenced on 6 May and concluded with the Grand Final on 24 September 2017.

The competition was contested by ten clubs with two changes from the inaugural season – Knox were replaced by the Box Hill Hawks (operated by the Hawthorn Football Club); and Geelong Magpies were replaced by the Geelong Cats.

Inaugural premiers Darebin defeated Diamond Creek by seven points in the Grand Final played at Etihad Stadium, with the match played as a double-header with the VFL Grand Final.

== Clubs ==
- Darebin, Diamond Creek, Eastern Devils, Geelong Cats, Box Hill
- Melbourne University, Seaford, St Kilda Sharks, Western Spurs, Cranbourne

== Ladder ==
| Pos | Team | Pld | W | L | D | PF | PA | PP | Pts | Qualification |
|---|---|---|---|---|---|---|---|---|---|---|
| 1 | Darebin (P) | 14 | 12 | 2 | 0 | 873 | 319 | 273.7 | 48 | Finals series |
| 2 | Diamond Creek | 14 | 12 | 2 | 0 | 803 | 421 | 190.7 | 48 | Finals series |
| 3 | Melbourne University | 14 | 10 | 4 | 0 | 755 | 414 | 182.4 | 40 | Finals series |
| 4 | St Kilda Sharks | 14 | 10 | 4 | 0 | 749 | 493 | 151.9 | 40 | Finals series |
| 5 | Geelong Cats | 14 | 8 | 6 | 0 | 545 | 431 | 126.5 | 32 | |
| 6 | Western Spurs | 14 | 7 | 7 | 0 | 563 | 584 | 96.4 | 28 | |
| 7 | Eastern Devils | 14 | 5 | 9 | 0 | 684 | 708 | 96.6 | 20 | |
| 8 | Box Hill | 14 | 3 | 11 | 0 | 382 | 718 | 53.2 | 12 | |
| 9 | Cranbourne | 14 | 3 | 11 | 0 | 298 | 889 | 33.5 | 12 | |
| 10 | Seaford | 14 | 0 | 14 | 0 | 260 | 935 | 27.8 | 0 | |

Source: SportsTG
Rules for classification: 1) points; 2) percentage; 3) number of points for.
(P) Premiers

== Finals series ==
=== Semi-finals ===
| | First Semi Final |
| Sunday 10 September (11:00 am) | Melbourne University 5.9 (39) | def. by | St Kilda Sharks 9.5 (59) | Coburg City Oval |

| | Second Semi Final |
| Sunday 10 September (1:00 pm) | Darebin 2.9 (21) | def. by | Diamond Creek 7.4 (46) | Coburg City Oval |

=== Preliminary final ===
| | Preliminary Final |
| Saturday 16 September (2:30 am) | Darebin 4.4 (28) | def. | St Kilda Sharks 3.5 (23) | Coburg City Oval |

=== Grand Final ===
2017 VFLW Grand Final
Sunday 24 September (12:00 pm) | Diamond Creek | def. by | Darebin | Etihad Stadium
0.2 (2); 0.2 (2); 2.2 (14); 4.4 (28) | Q1; Q2; Q3; Final | 2.1 (13); 2.3 (15); 4.4 (28); 5.5 (35) | Lisa Hardeman Medal: Karen Paxman (Darebin); Television broadcast: Seven Network
S. Abbatangelo 2 C. Molloy, K. Loynes 1 | Goals | K. Brennan 2 D. Pearce, M. McDonald, E. Marinoff 1
K. Loynes, L. Brazzale, S. Chiocci, L. Morecroft, S. Audley, R. Hicks | Best | D. Pearce, K. Paxman, E. Birch, K. Brennan, E. O'Dea, L. Pearce
Darebin won back-to-back VFLW premierships, their fifth straight premiership after winning the 2013–2015 VWFL grand finals.

== Awards ==
- Lambert-Pearce Medal (Best and Fairest): Katie Brennan (Darebin)
- Rohenna Young Medal (Leading Goal kicker): Katie Brennan (Darebin) & Chloe Molloy (Diamond Creek) – 32 goals
- Debbie Lee Medal (Rising Star): Chloe Molloy (Diamond Creek)
- Coach of the Year: Paul Hood (Geelong)
- Lisa Hardeman Medal (Best on ground VFL Women's Grand Final): Karen Paxman (Darebin)
- Swisse VFLW Play of the Year: Aliesha Newman (VU Western Spurs) - Rd 3 Vs Melbourne Uni (Best play of the year in Women's VFLW Home and Away Season)

2017 VFL Women's Team of the Year
| B: | Gab Pound (Melbourne Uni) | Nicola Stevens (Melbourne Uni) | Tanya Hetherington (Diamond Creek) |
| HB: | Kaitlyn Ashmore (Melbourne Uni) | Melissa Hickey (Darebin) | Karen Paxman (Darebin) |
| C: | Emma Kearney (Melbourne Uni) | Brianna Davey (St Kilda Sharks) | Richelle Cranston (Geelong) |
| HF: | Lily Mithen (Geelong) | Jasmine Garner (St Kilda Sharks) | Katie Brennan (Darebin) |
| F: | Chloe Molloy (Diamond Creek) | Darcy Vescio (Darebin) | Sarah Jolly (VU Western Spurs) |
| Foll: | Emma King (Eastern Devils) | Ellie Blackburn (Melbourne Uni) | Daisy Pearce (Darebin) |
| Int: | Melissa Kuys (Box Hill) | Alison Downie (Diamond Creek) | Steph Chiocci (Diamond Creek) |
| Int: | Jenna Bruton (St Kilda Sharks) | Sarah Hosking (Seaford) | Ashleigh Riddell (Diamond Creek) |
| Coach: | Paul Hood (Geelong) | | |
