= 2016 VFL Women's season =

- Teams: 10
- Premiers: Darebin; 1st premiership
- Minor premiers: Darebin; 1st minor premiership
- Best and fairest: Daisy Pearce; Darebin (33 votes)
- Leading goalkicker: Moana Hope; St Kilda Sharks (104 goals)

The 2016 VFL Women's season was the inaugural season of the VFL Women's (VFLW). The season commenced on 3 April and concluded with the grand final on 18 September 2016. The competition was contested by ten clubs, most of whom were independent clubs that had been transferred from the now-defunct Victorian Women's Football League (VWFL).

Going undefeated through the season, Darebin won the inaugural Grand Final played at Piranha Park by 12 points against Melbourne University, before a crowd of approximately 4,000 people. The win was Darebin's fourth successive premiership after winning the final three seasons of the former VWFL competition.

Many of the players who played in the Grand Final were subsequently drafted by clubs ahead of the 2017 AFL Women's season.

== Clubs ==
- Darebin Falcons, Diamond Creek, Eastern Devils, Geelong Magpies, Knox
- Melbourne University, Seaford, St Kilda Sharks, Western Spurs, Cranbourne

== Ladder ==
Pos	Team	Pld	W	L	D	PF	PA	PP	Pts	Qualification
1	Darebin (P)	18	18	0	0	2008	439	457.4	72	Finals series
2	St Kilda Sharks	18	14	3	1	1628	632	257.6	58	Finals series
3	Melbourne University	18	13	4	1	1546	522	296.2	54	Finals series
4	Eastern Devils	18	13	5	0	1584	716	221.2	52	Finals series
5	Diamond Creek	18	9	9	0	1091	1004	108.7	36	
6	Western Spurs	18	8	10	0	1123	974	115.3	32	
7	Seaford	18	6	12	0	720	1371	52.5	24	
8	Cranbourne	18	5	13	0	680	1548	43.9	20	
9	Geelong Magpies	18	2	16	0	523	1471	35.6	8	
10	Knox	18	1	17	0	227	2453	9.3	4	

Source: SportsTG
Rules for classification: 1) points; 2) percentage; 3) number of points for.
(P) Premiers

== Finals series ==
=== Semi-finals ===
	First Semi Final
Sunday 28 August (12:00 pm)	Melbourne University 6.14 (50)	def.	Eastern Devils 4.2 (26)	Box Hill City Oval

	Second Semi Final
Sunday 28 August (2:30 pm)	Darebin 17.11 (113)	def.	St Kilda Sharks 1.1 (7)	Box Hill City Oval

=== Preliminary final ===
	Preliminary Final
Sunday 11 September (11:50 am)	St Kilda Sharks 4.6 (30)	def. by	Melbourne University 10.10 (70)	ETU Stadium

=== Grand Final ===
2016 VFLW Grand Final
Sunday 18 September (2:30 pm)	Darebin	def.	Melbourne University	Coburg City Oval (crowd: 4,000)	Teams; Reports:
4.5 (29); 5.8 (38); 8.9 (57); 9.9 (63)	Q1; Q2; Q3; Final	1.0 (6); 4.1 (25); 5.1 (31); 8.3 (51)	Lisa Hardeman Medal: Darcy Vescio (Darebin)
D. Vescio, N. Callinan, K. Brennan 2 J. Lange, J. Dal Pos, M. Hickey 1	Goals	K. Tapner 3 J. Anderson, E. Blackburn 2 K. Ashmore 1
D. Vescio, K. Paxman, D. Pearce, J. Dal Pos, E. O'Dea, M. Hickey	Best	E. Kearney, E. Blackburn, A. Eva, K. Ashmore, K. Tapner, N. Stevens

== Awards ==
- Lambert–Pearce Medal (Best and Fairest): Daisy Pearce (Darebin)
- Rohenna Young Medal (Leading Goalkicker): Moana Hope (St Kilda Sharks) – 104 goals
- Debbie Lee Medal (Rising Star): Sarah Hosking (Seaford)
- Lisa Hardeman Medal (Best on Ground in Grand Final): Darcy Vescio (Darebin)
