= Melissa Hickey =

Australian rules footballer

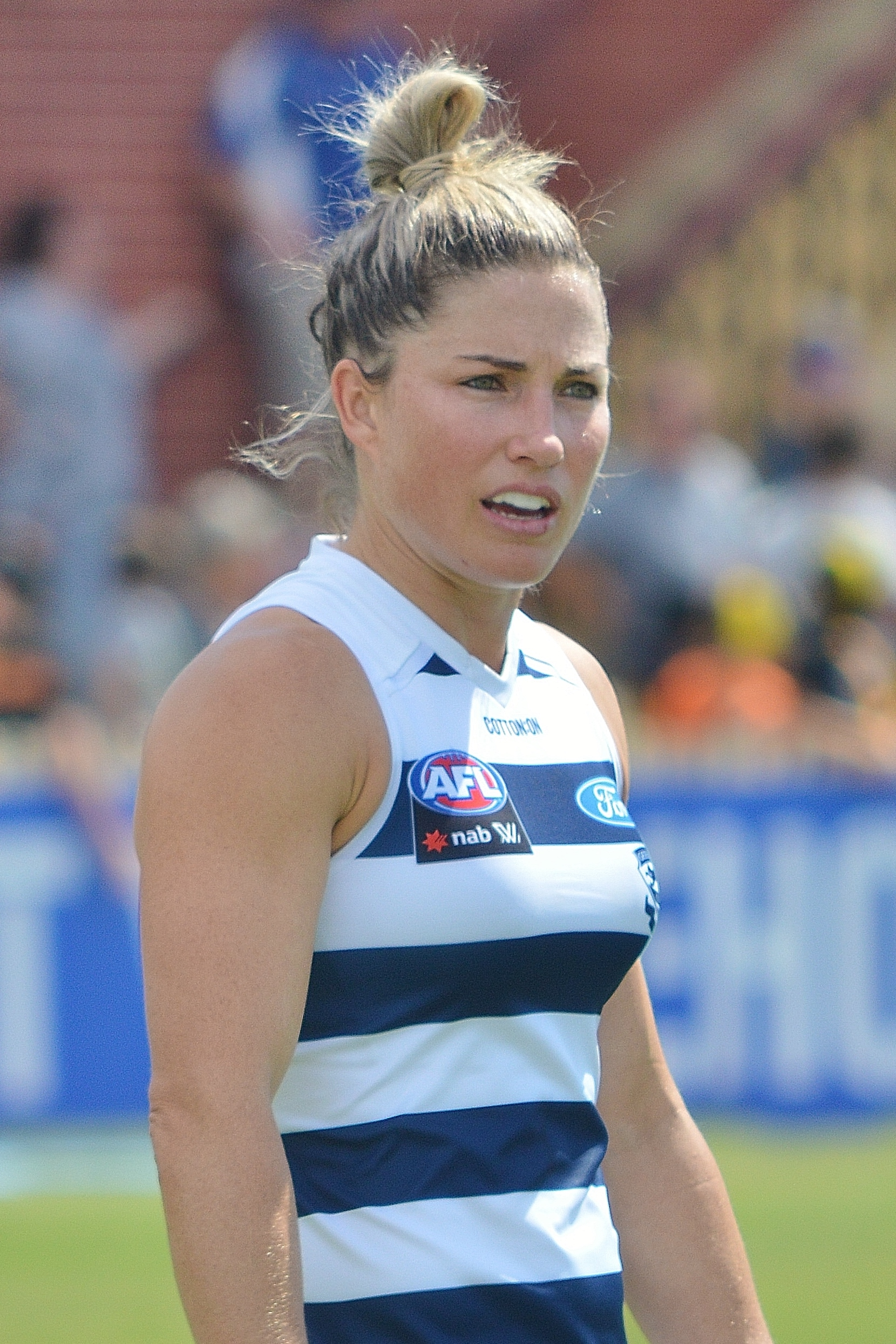
- Hickey playing for Geelong in 2020

Personal information
- Full name: Melissa Hickey
- Born: 18 December 1984 (age 41); Red Cliffs, Victoria
- Original team: Darebin (VFLW)
- Draft: 2016 marquee signing
- Debut: Round 1, 2017, Melbourne vs. Brisbane, at Casey Fields
- Height: 174 cm (5 ft 9 in)
- Position: Defender

Playing career^{1}
Years	Club	Games (Goals)
2017–2018	Melbourne	13 (2)
2019–2020	Geelong	12 (0)
Total		25 (2)

Representative team honours^{2}
Years	Team	Games (Goals)
2017	Victoria	1 (0)
- ^{1} Playing statistics correct to the end of the 2020 season.^{2} Representative statistics correct as of 2017.

Career highlights
- AFLW: Geelong captain: 2019–2020; AFL Women's All-Australian team: 2017; VWFL/VFLW: 7× VWFL/VFLW premiership player: 2009, 2010, 2013, 2014, 2015, 2016, 2017; VFL Women's team of the year: 2016

Melissa Hickey (born 18 December 1984) is a former Australian rules footballer who played for the Melbourne Football Club and the Geelong Football Club in the AFL Women's (AFLW). She served as Geelong captain in the club's first two AFL Women's seasons. She also played in the Victorian Women's Football League/VFL Women's for eleven seasons, representing the St Albans Spurs, Darebin and Geelong. In the VWFL/VFLW, Hickey won seven premierships, represented Victoria on three occasions and featured in the VFL Women's team of the year.

Hickey represented Melbourne in the exhibition games staged prior to the creation of AFL Women's before being drafted by the club in 2016 as a marquee signing prior to the inaugural AFL Women's season. She was selected in the inaugural AFL Women's All-Australian team in 2017, and also represented Victoria in the inaugural AFL Women's State of Origin match. Following the 2018 season, Hickey was announced as one of four Melbourne players to join Geelong ahead of the club's inaugural season in the AFL Women's.

== Early life ==
Hickey was born in Red Cliffs, Victoria, which is sixteen kilometres south of Mildura, and was raised in Mildura. She was born into a family with a strong history in Australian rules football; her great, great uncle, Pat Hickey, played in the inaugural round of the Victorian Football League in 1897 for Fitzroy and won two premierships with the club, her grandfather's cousin was Geelong legend and Australian Football Hall of Fame inductee, Reg Hickey, she's related to former Port Adelaide captain and coach, Matthew Primus, and her father, Peter Hickey, played an extensive career in Mildura. She played Australian rules football at a young age, including playing for her primary school, Irymple South Primary School. Without a pathway to playing football beyond the age of twelve for females, she turned to basketball and netball. She attended high school at St Josephs College in Mildura.

== State league and representative career ==
Hickey joined the Darebin Falcons in the Victorian Women's Football League (VWFL) in 2009 and won two premierships in her first two years at the club, in addition to representing Victoria during the 2010 AFL Women's National Championships. She changed clubs for the 2011 season and joined St Albans. She played the entire season until she tore her anterior cruciate ligament (ACL) during the finals series and subsequently missed St Albans' grand final victory; despite the injury, her season was rewarded with All-Australian honours. During the year, she represented Victoria for the second consecutive year at the AFL Women's National Championships.

Hickey was forced to miss the entire 2012 season due to her ACL injury and upon her return in 2013, she rejoined the Darebin Falcons and won her third VWFL premiership; in the grand final, she was awarded the Lisa Hardeman Medal as the best player on the ground. In the same year, she was recruited by the Melbourne Football Club with the eleventh selection in the 2013 women's draft and played in the inaugural women's AFL exhibition match against the Western Bulldogs at the Melbourne Cricket Ground in front of approximately 8000 people in a thirty-two point win. In the week prior to the inaugural women's AFL exhibition match, she represented Victoria in the 2013 AFL Women's National Championships, which included winning the championships and being named in the best players in the final.

Hickey's sixth season in VWFL saw her play in her fourth VWFL premiership with Darebin and play thirteen matches in total for the year. She was also one of thirteen players retained by the Melbourne Football Club to play in the 2014 women's AFL exhibition match against the Western Bulldogs, in which the club won by forty-six points at Etihad Stadium. She played every match for the 2015 VWFL season including Darebin's third consecutive premiership and her fifth overall. She was also one of six players retained by the Melbourne Football Club for the two exhibition matches against the Western Bulldogs in 2015. The club won both matches, the first by eight points and the second by four points. In the second match she received a reprimand for striking Western Bulldogs player, Jessica Wuestchner; although it was only an exhibition match, suspensions and reprimands carried over to the VWFL.

After committing herself to a hard-working pre-season leading into the 2016 season, she reaped the rewards by playing in seventeen matches for the year and was named as the centre half-back in the VFL Women's team of the year. In addition to winning her sixth VWFL premiership and fourth consecutive with the Darebin Falcons. With the expansion of the women's exhibition series, she played in three matches for Melbourne in 2016, including the all-star match in September against the Western Bulldogs at Whitten Oval as a showcase for the inaugural AFL Women's (AFLW) season in 2017.

== AFL Women's career ==
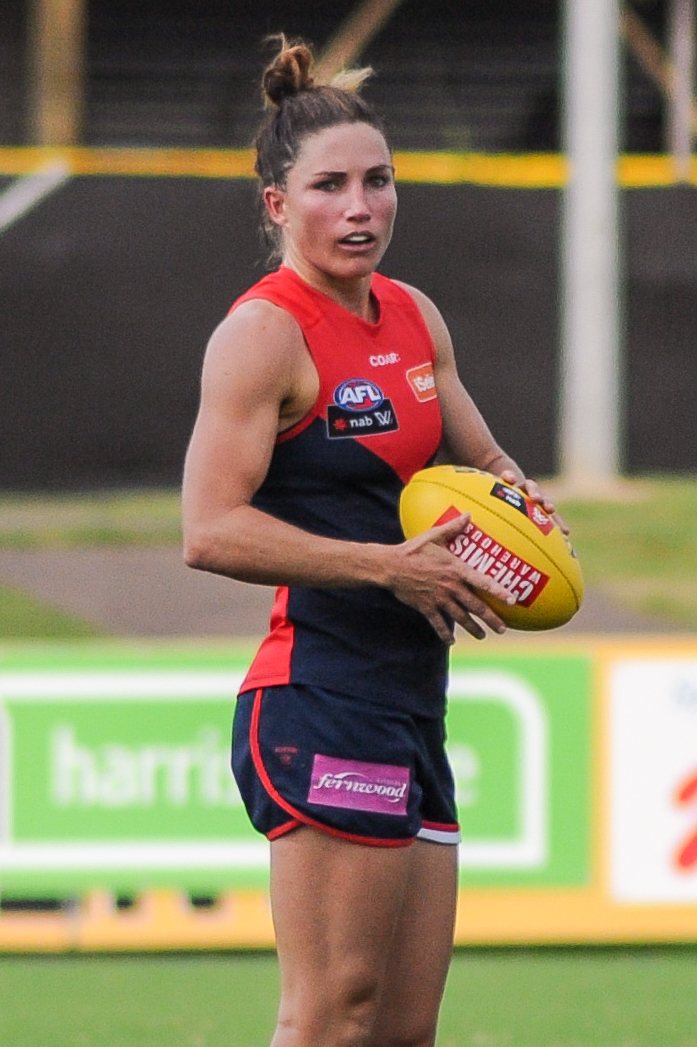
Hickey playing for Melbourne in 2017

=== Melbourne (2017–2018) ===
In July 2016, Hickey was announced as one of two marquee player signings for the Melbourne Football Club, alongside Daisy Pearce. She was announced as the vice-captain of the club alongside Elise O'Dea in January 2017. She debuted in Melbourne's inaugural match against Brisbane at Casey Fields in a fifteen-point loss, where she recorded thirteen disposals and three marks. In her second match, she was tasked with playing on Collingwood marquee forward, Moana Hope, and kept her goalless when playing on her in the nineteen point win at IKON Park. The next week, she kicked her first AFLW goal in the fourteen point win over the Western Bulldogs at Whitten Oval, and she was named in Melbourne's best players by AFL Media and The Age. At the end of the season, Hickey was listed in the 2017 All-Australian team.

Hickey played in the opening six rounds of the 2018 AFL Women's season before rupturing her ACL during the round six win against Carlton at Ikon Park and subsequently missed the final round of the season.

=== Geelong (2019–2020) ===
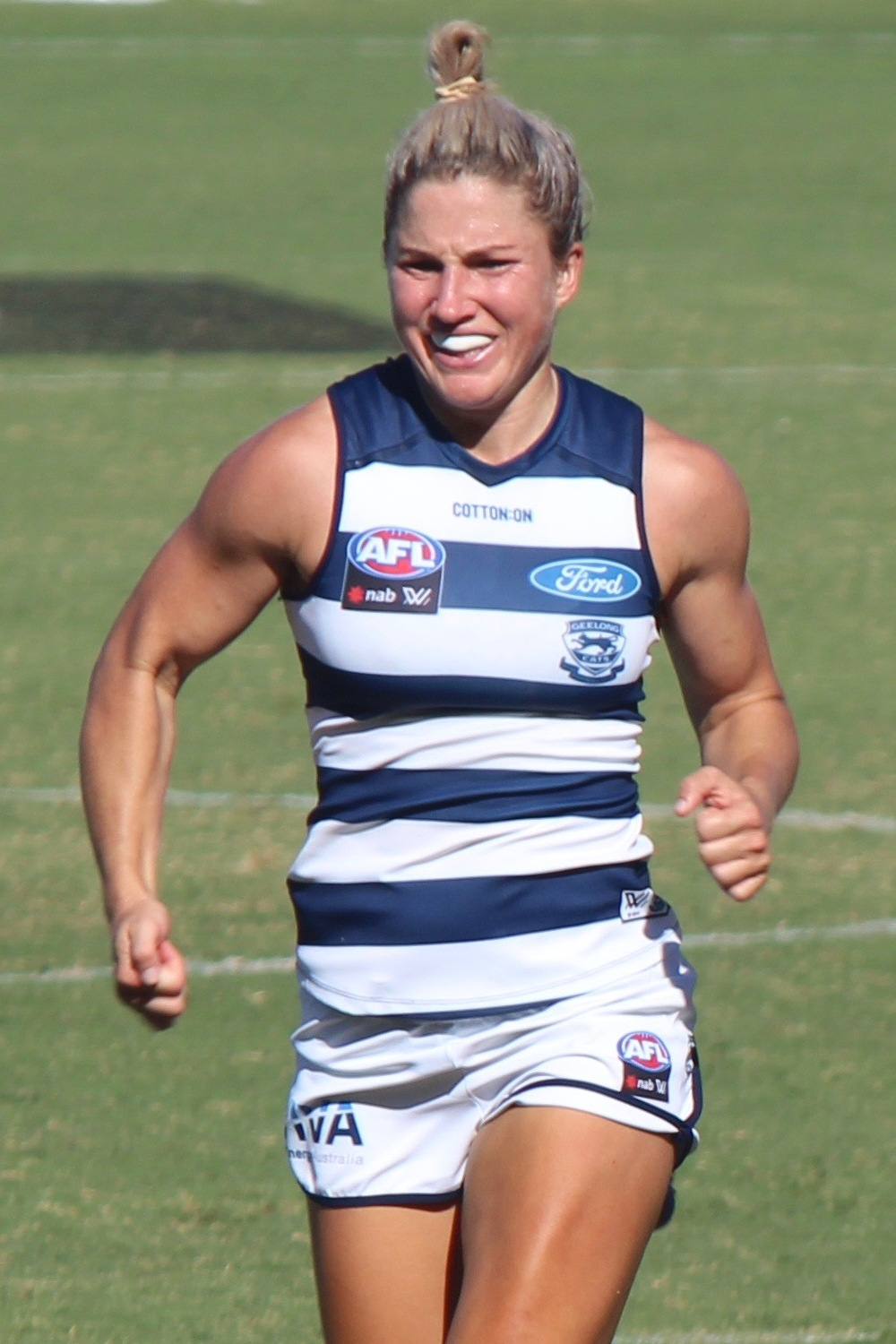
Hickey playing for Geelong in 2019

In May 2018, prior to the 2018 AFL Women's signing period, Hickey was announced as one of four Melbourne players, along with Richelle Cranston, Erin Hoare and Anna Teague, to join Geelong in the newly expanded competition. Hickey said that AFL head of football operations Steve Hocking, who had previously worked at Geelong as football manager for ten years, gave her "the best bit of advice I got out of all the people I spoke to", telling her to "put money out of the equation". She was officially signed by the club at the beginning of the trading and signing period on 11 May 2018. Hickey was named the club's inaugural captain in December.

After missing the first two rounds of the 2019 season to fully recover from her knee reconstruction, during which Geelong VFL Women's captain Rebecca Goring captained the team, Hickey made her Geelong debut in round 3. She later led Geelong in its first finals appearance the following month. At the end of the 2020 season, which was cut short as a result of the COVID-19 pandemic, Hickey announced her retirement.

== Statistics ==
Legend
G	Goals	K	Kicks	D	Disposals	T	Tackles
B	Behinds	H	Handballs	M	Marks

Season	Team	No.	Games	Totals							Averages (per game)							Votes
Season	Team	No.	Games	G	B	K	H	D	M	T	G	B	K	H	D	M	T	Votes
2017	Melbourne	18	7	1	0	36	45	81	19	26	0.1	0.0	5.2	6.4	11.6	2.7	3.7	0
2018	Melbourne	18	6	1	0	29	30	59	11	24	0.1	0.0	4.8	5.0	9.8	1.8	4.0	2
2019	Geelong	18	6	0	0	33	26	59	18	23	0.0	0.0	5.5	4.3	9.8	3.0	3.8	0
2020	Geelong	18	6	0	0	31	20	51	15	6	0.0	0.0	5.2	3.3	8.5	2.5	1.0	0
Career			25	2	0	129	121	250	63	79	0.1	0.0	5.2	4.8	10.0	2.5	3.2	2

== Coaching ==
Hickey is currently the coach of the Vic Country team which participates in the AFLW Under 19 Championships, and was named in the All-Australian team as the coach in 2021.

== Personal life ==
Hickey was in a relationship with fellow AFLW player Katie Brennan from 2012 to 2017.

Hickey is currently in a relationship with former teammate Danielle Higgins, and they share a son, named River, born in 2024.

== Honours and achievements ==
Individual

- Geelong captain: 2019–2020
- AFL Women's All-Australian team: 2017
- Victoria representative honours in AFL Women's State of Origin: 2017
