= List of VFL Women's premiers =

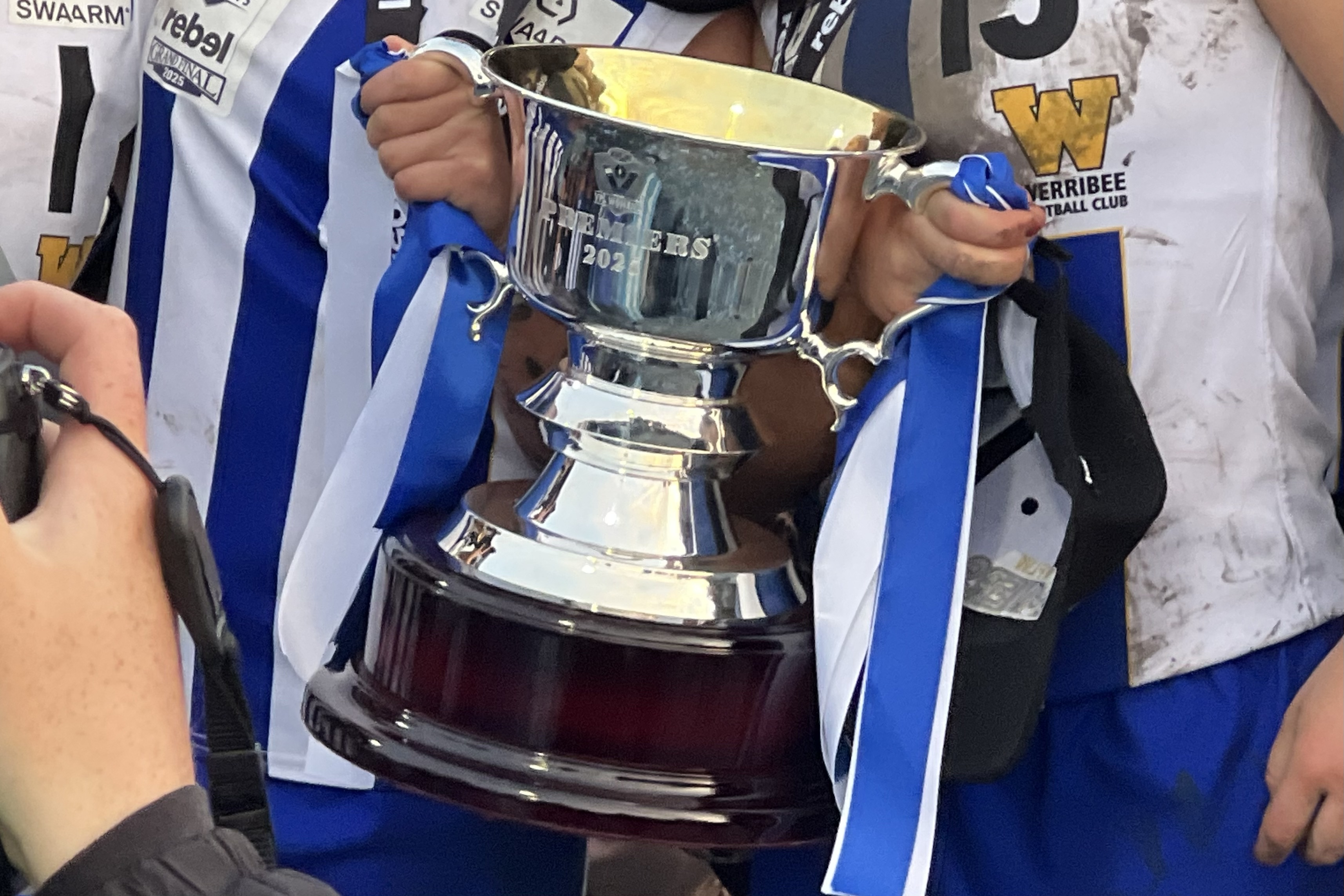
The 2025 VFLW premiership cup

This page is a complete chronological listing of VFL Women's premiers. The VFL Women's (VFLW) is the major state-level women's Australian rules football league in Victoria.

North Melbourne Werribee have won the most premierships with three, followed by Darebin with two, and then Hawthorn, Collingwood, Essendon, and Port Melbourne with one premiership each.

The Lisa Hardeman Medal, named after women's football advocate Lisa Hardeman, is awarded to the player judged best-on-ground in the VFLW grand final.

== List of premiers ==
The following is a list of premiers and the grand final results.

Year	Premiers	Runners-up	Score	Lisa Hardeman Medal	Venue	Date	Ref
2016	Darebin	Melbourne University	9.9 (63) d. 8.3 (51)	Darcy Vescio (Darebin)	Coburg City Oval	18 September 2016	
2017	Darebin (2)	Diamond Creek	5.5 (35) d. 4.4 (28)	Karen Paxman (Darebin)	Docklands Stadium	24 September 2017	
2018	Hawthorn	Geelong Cats	4.6 (30) d. 2.5 (17)	Chantella Perera (Hawthorn)	Docklands Stadium	23 September 2018	
2019	Collingwood	Western Bulldogs	7.10 (52) d. 2.3 (15)	Stacey Livingstone (Collingwood)	Princes Park	22 September 2019	
2020	Season cancelled due to the impact of the COVID-19 pandemic						
2021	Grand final cancelled and premiership not awarded due to the impact of the COVID-19 pandemic						
2022	Essendon	Southern Saints	6.6 (42) d. 0.7 (7)	Alana Barba (Essendon)	North Port Oval	3 July 2022	
2023	Port Melbourne	Collingwood	5.5 (35) d. 3.5 (23)	Lauren Caruso (Port Melbourne)	North Port Oval	30 July 2023	
2024	North Melbourne	Western Bulldogs	10.8 (68) d. 7.6 (48)	Nyakoat Dojiok (North Melbourne)	North Port Oval	21 July 2024	
2025	North Melbourne Werribee (2)	Collingwood	5.4 (34) d 4.4 (28)	Alana Barba (North Melbourne Werribee)	North Port Oval	30 August 2025	
2026	North Melbourne Werribee (3)	Williamstown	4.1 (25) d 1.6 (12)	Alana Barba (North Melbourne Werribee)	Princes Park	20 September 2026	

== Premierships by team ==
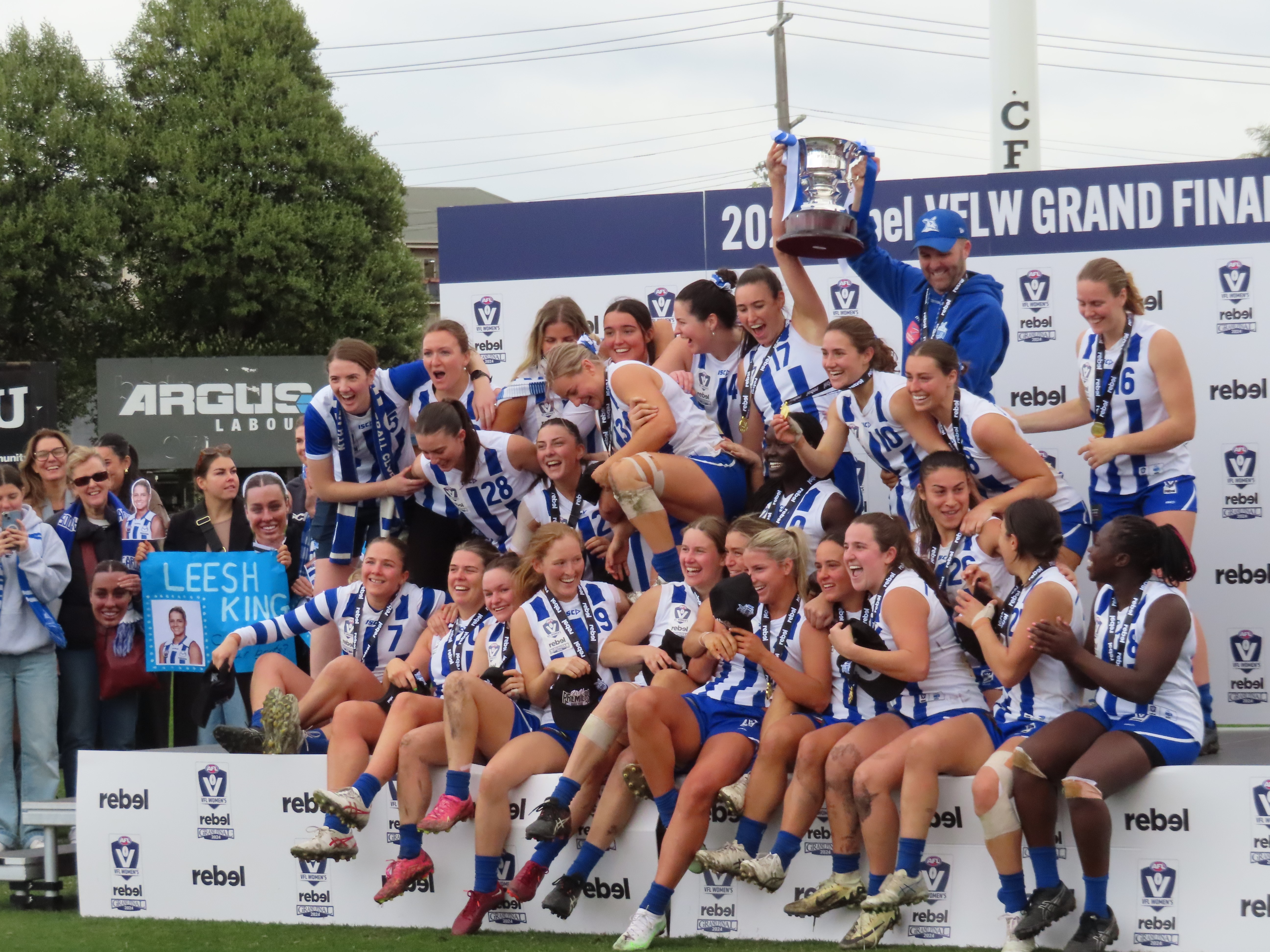
2024 premiers North Melbourne

Updated to the end of the 2026 season.

This table summarises all premierships won by each team.

Club	Grand final matches	Premierships		Runners-up		Years since last premiership
Club	Grand final matches	Total	Years	Total	Years	Years since last premiership
North Melbourne Werribee	3	3	2024, 2025, 2026	0	—	0
Darebin	2	2	2016, 2017	0	—	9
Collingwood	3	1	2019	2	2023, 2025	6
Essendon	1	1	2022	0	—	4
Port Melbourne	1	1	2023	0	—	3
Western Bulldogs	2	0	—	2	2019, 2024	—
Hawthorn	1	1	2018	0	—	—
Diamond Creek	1	0	—	1	2017	—
Geelong Cats	1	0	—	1	2018	—
Melbourne University	1	0	—	1	2016	—
Southern Saints	1	0	—	1	2022	—
Williamstown	1	0	—	1	2026	—
Box Hill	0	0	—	0	—	—
Carlton	0	0	—	0	—	—
Casey	0	0	—	0	—	—
Cranbourne	0	0	—	0	—	—
Eastern Devils	0	0	—	0	—	—
Geelong Magpies	0	0	—	0	—	—
Knox	0	0	—	0	—	—
Northern Territory	0	0	—	0	—	—
Richmond	0	0	—	0	—	—
Seaford	0	0	—	0	—	—
St Kilda Sharks	0	0	—	0	—	—
Western Spurs	0	0	—	0	—	—

=== Premiership frequency ===
Updated to the end of the 2026 season.

The 2021 season is not included in the latter three columns, as the season was not fully contested and no premiership was awarded. The cancelled 2020 season is also not included in these columns or the seasons column.

Club	Years in competition	Seasons	Premierships	Runners-up	Strike rate (based on seasons in competition)	Average years per	
Club	Years in competition	Seasons	Premierships	Runners-up	Strike rate (based on seasons in competition)	Premiership	Grand final
North Melbourne Werribee	2021–present	6	3	0	60.00%	1.7	1.7
Darebin	2016–present	10	2	0	22.22%	4.5	4.5
Port Melbourne	2021–present	6	1	0	20.00%	5.0	5.0
Collingwood	2018–present	8	1	2	14.29%	7.0	3.5
Essendon	2018–present	8	1	0	14.29%	7.0	7.0
Box Hill / Hawthorn	2017–present	9	1	0	12.50%	8.0	8.0
Diamond Creek	2016–2017	2	0	1	0.00%	—	2.0
Western Spurs / Western Bulldogs	2016–present	10	0	2	0.00%	—	5.0
Melbourne University	2016–2019	4	0	1	0.00%	—	4.0
Southern Saints / Sandringham	2018–present	8	0	1	0.00%	—	7.0
Williamstown	2018–present	8	0	1	0.00%	—	7.0
Geelong Cats	2017–present	9	0	1	0.00%	—	8.0
Carlton	2018–present	8	0	0	0.00%	—	—
Casey	2018–present	8	0	0	0.00%	—	—
Cranbourne	2016–2017	2	0	0	0.00%	—	—
Eastern Devils	2016–2017	2	0	0	0.00%	—	—
Northern Territory	2018–2019	2	0	0	0.00%	—	—
Richmond	2018–2020	2	0	0	0.00%	—	—
Seaford	2016–2017	2	0	0	0.00%	—	—
St Kilda Sharks	2016–2017	2	0	0	0.00%	—	—
Geelong Magpies	2016	1	0	0	0.00%	—	—
Knox	2016	1	0	0	0.00%	—	—
Tasmania	2026–present	1	0	0	0.00%	—	—

== Sources ==
- VFL/VFL Women's official website
