= Sarah Lampard =

Australian rules footballer

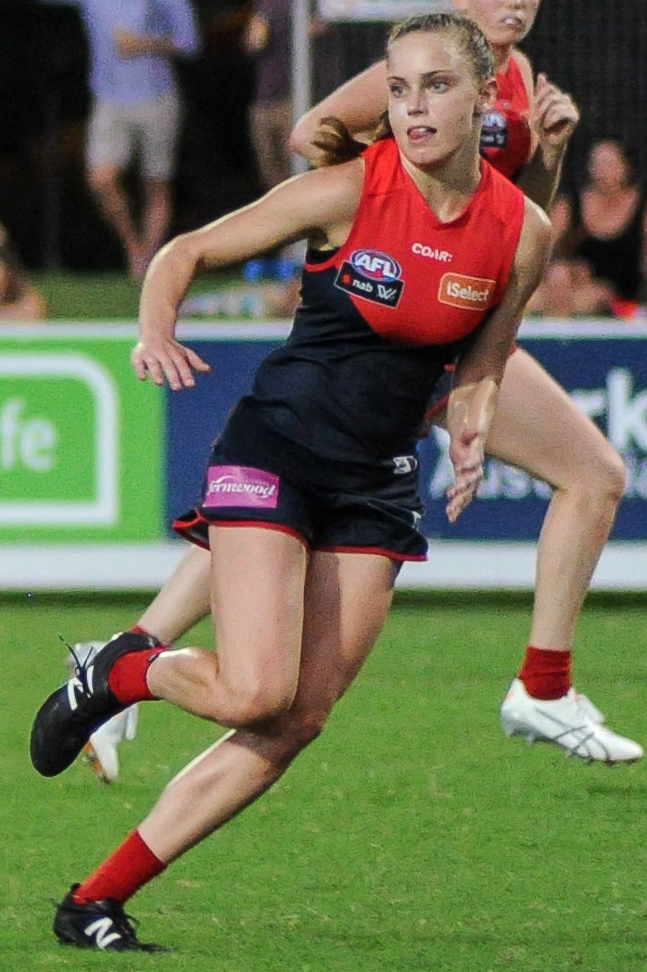
- Lampard playing for Melbourne in March 2017

Personal information
- Born: 7 July 1997 (age 29)
- Original team: VU Western Spurs (VFL Women's)
- Draft: No. 134, 2016 AFL Women's draft
- Debut: Round 1, 2017, Melbourne vs. Brisbane, at Casey Fields
- Height: 170 cm (5 ft 7 in)
- Position: Midfielder

Club information
- Current club: Melbourne
- Number: 8

Playing career^{1}
Years	Club	Games (Goals)
2017–	Melbourne	60 (5)
- ^{1} Playing statistics correct to the end of the 2023 season.

Career highlights
- AFLW premiership player: Season 7 (2022)

Sarah Lampard (born 7 July 1997) is an Australian rules footballer playing for the Melbourne Football Club in the AFL Women's competition. She was drafted by Melbourne with their seventeenth selection and 134th overall in the 2016 AFL Women's draft. She made her debut in the fifteen point loss to Brisbane at Casey Fields in the opening round of the 2017 season. She played every match in her debut season to finish with seven games.

Melbourne signed Lampard for the 2018 season during the trade period in May 2017.
