= Deborah Lee =

Deborah Lee is the name of:

- Deb Lee, fictional character from the American TV series One Tree Hill
- Debbie Lee (born 1974), Australian rules footballer
- Deborah Lee (film producer) (1949-2007), film producer for Scenes of the Crime
- Deborah Lee (actress) (born 1951), Hong Kong actress, ex-wife of Patrick Tse
