= South Eastern Women's Football =

Australian rules football competition

- Sport: Australian rules football
- Founded: 2017
- Folded: 2024
- Replaced by: Mornington Peninsula Nepean Football League
- Administrator: South Eastern Women's Football Collective
- Country: Australia
- Confederation: AFL South East
- Level on pyramid: 2
- Website: SEWF site

South Eastern Women's Football (SEWF) (Note: The logo of the competition spelt it 'South Eastern Womens' (without an apostrophe).) was an Australian rules football competition, based near the southeastern region of Melbourne, Victoria.

Following the 2023 season, all clubs moved to the Mornington Peninsula Nepean Football League, thus disbanding the SEWF competition.

== History ==
In 2017, women's football clubs from AFL Gippsland, AFL South East, AFL Yarra Ranges, the Eastern Football League and Southern Football Netball League joined the South Eastern Women's Football Collective following the disbandment of the Victorian Women's Football League (VWFL). The competition was made up of former VWFL clubs, as well as teams from local competitions.

The 2020 and 2021 seasons were abandoned due to the impact of the COVID-19 pandemic.

In its inaugural season until 2023, SEWF had Division 1 (renamed to Premier Division in 2021), Division 2 and a Development League (renamed to Division 3 in 2018).

At the end of the 2022 season, Division 3 was disbanded.

== Clubs ==
In its final season in 2023, the competition involved 19 teams − six in Premier Division and 13 in Division 2.

=== Final season ===
==== Premier Division ====
Club	Colours	Nickname	Home Ground	Former League	Est.	Seasons	Premierships		Current status
Club	Colours	Nickname	Home Ground	Former League	Est.	Seasons	Total	Years	Current status
Bass Coast		Breakers	Dalyston Recreation Reserve, Dalyston	–	2017	2017-2023	1	Div 2: 2018	Moved to Mornington Peninsula FNL in 2024
Frankston		Dolphins	Kinetic Stadium, Frankston	–	1897	2021-2023	0	−	Moved to Mornington Peninsula FNL in 2024
Karingal		Bulls	Ballam Park, Frankston	–	1963	2017-2023	1	Div 3: 2019	Moved to Mornington Peninsula FNL in 2024
Mornington		Bulldogs	Alexandra Oval, Mornington	VWFL	1888	2017-2023	1	Prem Div: 2023	Moved to Mornington Peninsula FNL in 2024
Seaford		Tigers	RF Miles Recreation Reserve, Seaford	VWFL	1921	2017-2023	1	Prem Div: 2022	Moved to Mornington Peninsula FNL in 2024
Warragul Industrials		Dusties	Western Park, Warragul	–	1948	2017-2023	1	Div 2: 2022	Moved to Mornington Peninsula FNL in 2024

==== Division 2 ====
Club	Colours	Nickname	Home Ground	Former League	Est.	Seasons	Premierships		Current status
Club	Colours	Nickname	Home Ground	Former League	Est.	Seasons	Total	Years	Current status
Bonbeach		Sharks	Bonbeach Reserve, Bonbeach	–	1961	?-2023	0	−	Moved to Mornington Peninsula FNL in 2024
Cerberus		Dogs	HMAS Cerberus	–	2003	2017-2023	1	Div 3: 2022	Moved to Mornington Peninsula FNL in 2024 as Cerberus/Balnarring
Edithvale-Aspendale		Eagles	Regents Park, Aspendale	VWFL	1921	2017-2023	0	−	Moved to Mornington Peninsula FNL in 2024
Frankston		Dolphins	Kinetic Stadium, Frankston	–	1897	2021-2023	0	−	Moved to Mornington Peninsula FNL in 2024
Hastings		Blues	Hastings Park, Hastings	–	1899	2017-2023	0	−	In recess
Karingal		Bulls	Ballam Park, Frankston	–	1963	2017-2023	0	−	Moved to Mornington Peninsula FNL in 2024
Mornington Development		Bulldogs	Alexandra Oval, Mornington	VWFL	1888	2017-2023	0	−	Moved to Mornington Peninsula FNL in 2024
Mornington Reserves		Bulldogs	Alexandra Oval, Mornington	VWFL	1888	2017-2023	0	−	Moved to Mornington Peninsula FNL in 2024
Pearcedale		Panthers	Pearcedale Recreation Reserve, Pearcedale	–	1898	2017-2023	1	Div 2: 2023	Moved to Mornington Peninsula FNL in 2024
Pines		Pythons	Eric Bell Reserve, Frankston North	–	1964	2021-2023	0	−	Moved to Mornington Peninsula FNL in 2024
Red Hill		Hillmen	Red Hill Recreation Reserve, Red Hill	–	1929	2017-2023	0	−	Moved to Mornington Peninsula FNL in 2024
Seaford 2		Tigers	RF Miles Recreation Reserve, Seaford	VWFL	1921	2017-2023	0	−	Moved to Mornington Peninsula FNL in 2024
Tyabb		Yabbies	Bunguyan Reserve, Tyabb	–	1899	2017-2023	0	Div 2: 2019 Div 3: 2017	Moved to Mornington Peninsula FNL in 2024
Warragul Industrials 2		Dusties	Western Park, Warragul	VWFL	1948	2017-2023	0	−	Moved to Mornington Peninsula FNL in 2024

=== Former clubs ===
Club	Colours	Nickname	Home Ground	Former League	Est.	Seasons	Premierships		Fate
Club	Colours	Nickname	Home Ground	Former League	Est.	Seasons	Total	Years	Fate
Beaconsfield		Eagles	Holm Park, Beaconsfield	VWFL	1890	2017-2020	1	Div 2: 2017	Moved to Eastern FNL in 2021
Bunyip		Bulldogs	Bunyip Recreation Reserve, Bunyip	–	1902	2017	0	−	Moved to Female Football Gippsland in 2018
Chirnside Park		Panthers	Kimberley Reserve, Chirnside Park	VWFL	1978	2017-2018	0	−	Moved to Eastern FNL in 2019
Coburg		Lions	Coburg City Oval, Coburg	–	1891	2021-2022	0	−	Moved to VAFA in 2023
Cranbourne		Eagles	Livingston Recreation Reserve, Cranbourne East	VWFL	1889	2017-2019	0	−	In recess
Devon Meadows		Panthers	Casey Fields, Cranbourne East	–	1979	2022	0	−	In recess
Eastern Devils		Devils	Mulgrave Reserve, Mulgrave	VWFL	1999	2017-2021	2	Prem. Div: 2017, 2018	Moved to Eastern FNL in 2022
Endeavour Hills		Eagles	Barry Simon Reserve, Endeavour Hills	VWFL	2011	2017-2018	0	−	Moved to Southern FNL in 2019
Fountain Gate		Gators	Max Pawsey Reserve, Narre Warren	–	1999	2021-2022	0	−	In recess
Frankston		Bombers	Baxter Park, Frankston South	–	1974	2017-2021	0	−	In recess
Frankston Dolphins		Dolphins	Overport Park, Frankston South	–	2017	2017	0	−	Moved to Southern FNL in 2018
Gippsland		Maroons	Traralgon Recreation Reserve, Traralgon	VWFL	2015	2017-2018	0	−	Folded - 2018
Knox		Falcons	Knox Gardens Reserve, Wantirna South	VWFL	1980	2017	0	−	Moved to Eastern FNL in 2018
Lang Lang		Tigers	Lang Lang Community Recreation Precinct, Caldermeade	–	1895	2021-2022	0	−	In recess
Morwell East		Hawks	Morwell East Recreation Reserve, Morwell	–	1973	2017	0	−	In recess
Mount Eliza		Demons	Emil Madsden Reserve, Mount Eliza	–	1966	2021-2022	0	−	In recess
Murrumbeena		Lions	Murrumbeena Park, Murrumbeena	–	1918	2019	0	−	Moved to Southern FNL in 2020
Officer		Kangaroos	Officer Recreation Reserve, Officer	–	1977	2017-2020	0	−	Moved to Outer East FNL in 2021
Pakenham		Lions	Toomuc Reserve, Pakenham	–	1892	2018-2020	0	−	Moved to Outer East FNL in 2021
Port Melbourne Colts		Colts	J.L. Murphy Reserve, Port Melbourne	VWFL	1957	2017-2019	0	−	In recess
St Kilda		Sharks	Peanut Farm Reserve, St Kilda	VWFL	1992	2017-2021	1	Prem. Div: 2019	Folded in 2022

== Premiers ==
Year	Division	Premiers	Runners-up	Score	Venue	Date
2017	Div 1	Eastern Devils	St Kilda Sharks	7.4 (46) d. 3.2 (20)	Casey Fields	10 September 2017
2017	Div 2	Beaconsfield	Endeavour Hills	2.1 (13) d. 1.2 (8)	Casey Fields	10 September 2017
2017	Develop.	Tyabb	Bass Coast	4.5 (29) d. 4.4 (28)	Casey Fields	10 September 2017
2018	Div 1	Eastern Devils	Seaford	2.5 (17) d. 2.2 (14)	Holm Park Reserve	1 September 2018
2018	Div 2	Bass Coast	Tyabb	5.4 (34) d. 2.8 (20)	Holm Park Reserve	1 September 2018
2018	Div 3	Pearcedale	Hastings	3.9 (27) d. 3.1 (19)	Holm Park Reserve	1 September 2018
2019	Div 1	St Kilda Sharks	Eastern Devils	3.2 (20) d. 2.4 (16)	Shepley Oval	8 September 2019
2019	Div 2	Tyabb	Murrumbeena	2.8 (20) d. 1.1 (7)	Shepley Oval	8 September 2019
2019	Div 3	Karingal	Pakenham	5.12 (42) d. 2.6 (18)	Shepley Oval	8 September 2019
2020	(No season due to COVID-19)					
2021	(Season curtailed due to COVID-19)					
2022	Premier	Seaford	Coburg	5.3 (33) d. 5.2 (32)	Frankston Park	4 September 2022
2022	Div 2	Warragul Industrials	Bass Coast	4.2 (26) d. 2.7 (19)	Frankston Park	4 September 2022
2022	Div 3	Cerberus	Lang Lang	10.14 (74) d. 1.4 (10)	Frankston Park	4 September 2022
2023	Premier	Mornington	Frankston	5.13 (43) d. 3.2 (20)	Frankston Park	3 September 2023
2023	Div 2	Pearcedale	Mornington	7.5 (47) d. 3.2 (20)	Frankston Park	3 September 2023
