= The Club (Australian TV series) =

- Genre: Sports
- Country of origin: Australia
- No. of series: 1

Original release
- Network: Seven Network
- Release: 2002

The Club is an Australian reality television show about an Australian rules football sporting side, the Hammerheads, which was screened on the Seven Network in 2002 for one series. It was seen as a way for Seven to stay involved in football after losing the broadcast rights to the Australian Football League after the 2001 season.

The show featured a handpicked team of amateur footballers coached by former VFL/AFL legend David Rhys-Jones which played against various Victorian football sides from the Western Region Football League second division, following the trials and tribulations of its players.

Unlike normal clubs, the home audience were able to influence who was selected in the team each week by voting to keep their favourite players in the side. Viewers also got to vote on many of the club's other key aspects including its name, coach, captain and song.

The show was considered trailblazing and generated a cult following, with several crowds at games featuring the Hammerheads pushing 5,000 spectators and many claiming the Hammerheads as their second favourite sporting team. After finishing the regular season in third position, the Hammerheads went on to win the Grand Final and claim the flag in their first – and only – season.

In its premiere, the series received an average of 410,000 viewers. The show had good ratings in Melbourne but was not aired during primetime in other states. The expensive production of the series, coupled with the low viewership outside of Melbourne, led to its cancellation.

== Reception ==
Robert Fidgeon of the Herald Sun called the show "honest-to-God, kitchen-sink reality television that just happens to involve a footy team." In a negative review, Leaping' Larry L of The Age wrote, "after about 10 minutes of this one, I had all the energy of the average speed hump, and felt that sitting in the same spot until my pension kicked in was a viable course of action".

== Controversy ==
The show also achieved its share of controversy and publicity. The Hammerheads attempted to have a woman, Debbie Lee, play on their team in competition games but were ultimately stopped by the league. There were also criticisms of personal attacks by coach Rhys-Jones on players.
