= Sarah Jolly =

Australian rules footballer (born 1992)

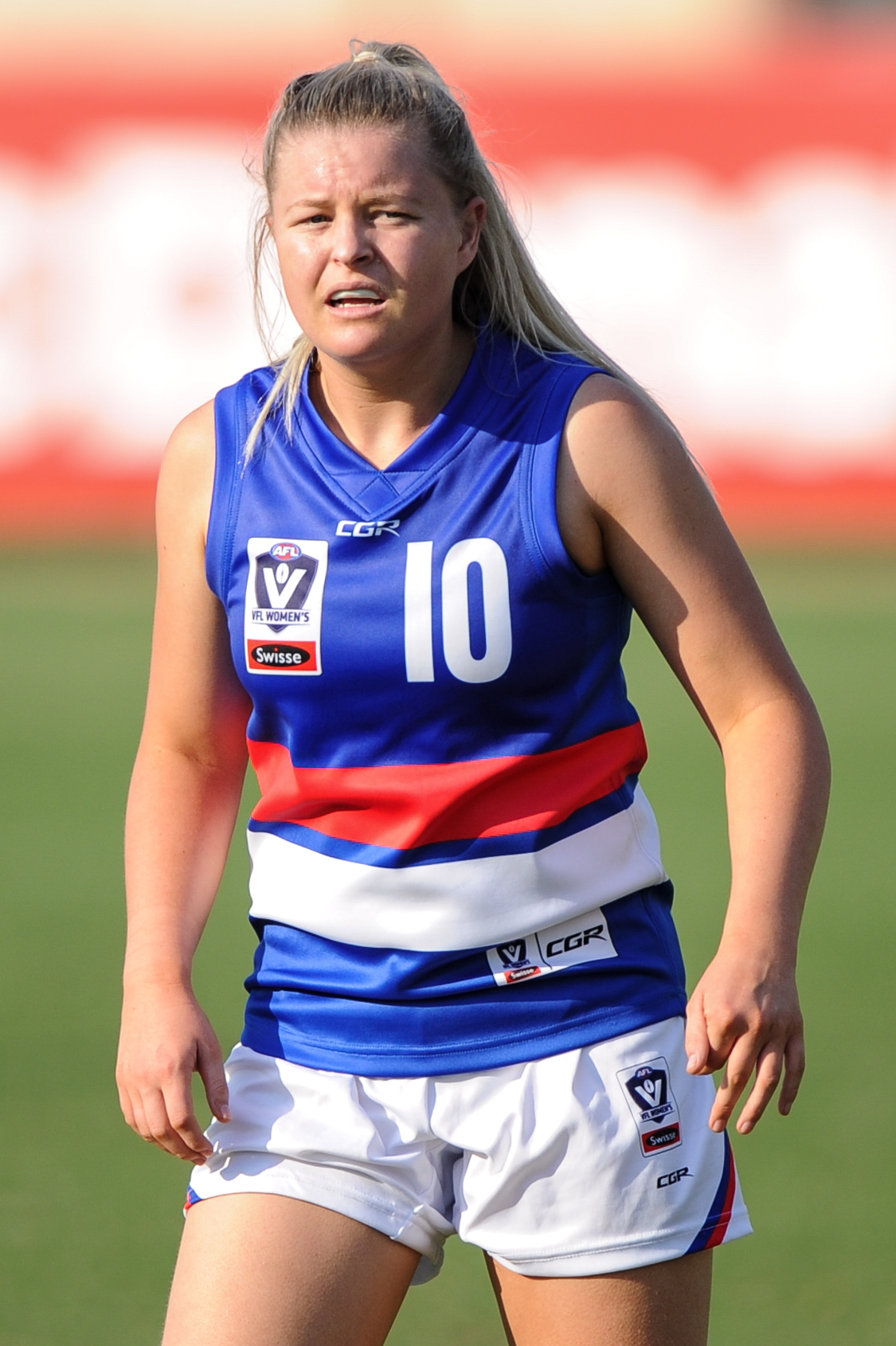
- Jolly in June 2018

Personal information
- Born: 1 February 1992 (age 34)
- Original team: Gippsland Galaxy (VWFL)
- Draft: No. 145, 2016 AFL Women's draft
- Debut: Round 2, 2017, Melbourne vs. Collingwood, at Ikon Park
- Height: 162 cm (5 ft 4 in)
- Position: Midfielder

Playing career^{1}
Years	Club	Games (Goals)
2017	Melbourne	3 (1)
- ^{1} Playing statistics correct to the end of 2017.

Sarah Jolly (born 1 February 1992) is an Australian rules footballer who played for the Melbourne Football Club in the AFL Women's competition. She was drafted by Melbourne with their nineteenth selection and 145th overall in the 2016 AFL Women's draft. She made her debut in the nineteen point win against Collingwood at Ikon Park in round two of the 2017 season. She played the next week in the fourteen point win against the Western Bulldogs at VU Whitten Oval before being omitted for the round four match against Carlton at Casey Fields. She returned for the five point loss to Greater Western Sydney at Blacktown International Sportspark Oval in round five, which was her last match for the year and she finished the season with three games. She was not retained on Melbourne's list at the end of the season and was subsequently delisted in May 2017.
