= Victorian Women's Football League =

Australian rules football league for women

- Sport: Australian rules football
- First season: 1981
- Folded: 2016
- Replaced by: VFL Women's; South Eastern Women's Football
- No. of teams: 31 (final season)
- Country: Australia
- Headquarters: Melbourne, Australia
- Last champion: Deer Park (2016)
- Most titles: Scorpions (11)
- Broadcaster: C31
- Website: Victorian Women's Football League

The Victorian Women's Football League (VWFL) was an amateur Australian rules football league based in Victoria, Australia. At the time of its dissolution, it was the oldest and largest Australian rules football league for women in the world, consisting of 47 clubs from across seven divisions housing a total of more than 1,000 players.

== History ==
=== Early years ===
The Victorian Women's Football League was formed in 1981 with four teams competing at open level.

In 1995, Sal Rees caused controversy when she nominated for the 1995 AFL draft: the nomination was subsequently voided, with the AFL amending its draft rules to prevent any repeat of this incident.

From 1997, when the VWFL introduce a reserves division, the league grew quickly, increasing dramatically the number of players and participating teams, with a Division 3 added in 2001.

In 2002, VWFL player Debbie Lee made headlines for pushing to play against men in the made-for-television team the Hammerheads. She has commented, "My whole idea with the Hammerheads was to promote women's football. At no point in time did I really think I was going to play against the men, and frankly it wouldn't really have been smart for me to do that. My whole idea was to cause a bit of activity."

An U17 Youth Girls Competition was established by Football Victoria in 2004, primarily to provide a pathway to the VWFL. This was following legal action having been taken against them in the Victorian Civil and Administrative Tribunal (following a complaint to the Equal Opportunity Commission) by junior players Penny Cula-Reid, Emily Stayner, and Helen Taylor.

In May 2004, the first VWFL game was played at the Melbourne Cricket Ground (MCG), with the Melbourne Uni Mugars defeating St Albans Spurs on Mother's Day. A second game was played at the MCG later in the same year, featuring the Mugars and St Kilda Sharks reserves teams.

=== A quarter-century of competition ===
In 2005, the VWFL celebrated its 25th season.

In 2006, the league posted a $6000 loss, however this was turned around in 2007 with a $19000 profit being posted at the end of 2007. 2007 saw five divisions (Premier seniors & reserves, North West, South East & Country) and 27 teams (from 20 clubs), and culminated in an Australian crowd record for women's Australian rules football at the 2007 Grand Final held on 19 August at the Preston City Oval in Melbourne. Two finals matches were also held at the Melbourne Cricket Ground for the first time.

The work done by the VWFL Media Manager Leesa Catto was instrumental in increasing media coverage across the competition. A significant partnership was negotiated with the Leader News group and weekly coverage was captured across the Melbourne Metropolitan area. Events like the participation of two VWFL players Shannon McFerran and Daisy Pearce in the E. J. Whitten Legends Game also helped lift the profile of the league.

The VWFL integrated into AFL Victoria in 2013.

=== Dissolution ===
At the end of the 2016 season, it was announced that the VWFL would be dissolved, with the forty-seven clubs and sixty teams of the VWFL joining ten Victorian community leagues in 2017, along with additional clubs and teams from a further eighty clubs that had expressed interest in joining women's Australian football competitions. AFL Victoria would retain management of the ten-team VFL Women's league, with the remainder of the expected 150 teams to play in regional leagues.

== Clubs ==
=== Final clubs ===
==== Premier Division ====
Club	Colours	Nickname	Home Ground	Est.	Years in VWFL	VWFL Premierships		Fate
Club	Colours	Nickname	Home Ground	Est.	Years in VWFL	Total	Most Recent	Fate
Bendigo		Thunder	Kangaroo Flat Oval, Kangaroo Flat	2011	2011-2016	2	2013	Moved to Northern FNL in 2017
Deer Park		Lions	John McLeod Reserve, Deer Park	1926	1981-2016	1	2016	Moved to WREDWFL in 2017
Eastern Devils reserves (Note: Known as Deakin University from 1999 to 2007, and as East Burwood from 2008 to 2011.)		Devils	Mulgrave Reserve, Mulgrave	1999	1990–2016	2	2013	Moved to South East Women's Football in 2017
Melbourne University reserves		Mugars	University Oval, Parkville	1996	1997–2016	5	2005	Moved to Northern FNL in 2017
Port Melbourne Colts		Colts	J.L. Murphy Reserve, Port Melbourne	1957	2014-2016	1	2015	Moved to South East Women's Football in 2017
St Kilda Sharks reserves (Note: Known as St Kilda City from 1992 to 2010.)		Sharks	Peanut Farm Reserve, St Kilda	1992	1992–2016	4	2014	Moved to South East Women's Football in 2017

==== Division 1 ====
Club	Colours	Nickname	Home Ground	Est.	Years in VWFL	VWFL Premierships		Fate
Club	Colours	Nickname	Home Ground	Est.	Years in VWFL	Total	Most Recent	Fate
Darebin reserves (Note: Known as Fairfield from 1987 to 1999.)		Falcons	A.H. Capp Reserve Preston	1987	1987–2016	13	2015	Moved to Northern FNL in 2017
Diamond Creek reserves		Creekers	C.T. Barling Reserve, Reservoir	2002	2002–2015	3	2012	Moved to Northern FNL in 2017
Endeavour Hills		Eagles	Barry Simon Reserve, Endeavour Hills	2011	2015-2016	0	-	Moved to South East Women's Football in 2017
Kew		Bears	Victoria Park, Kew	2006	2014–2016	2	2016	Moved to Northern FNL in 2017
La Trobe University		Trobers	Tony Sheehan Oval, La Trobe University, Bundoora	1967	2009–2016	1	2011	Moved to Northern FNL in 2017
Pascoe Vale		Panthers	Raeburn Reserve, Pascoe Vale	1909	2013–2016	1	2013	Moved to Northern FNL in 2017
Redan		Lions	Western Oval, Ballarat Central	1871	2014–2016	0	-	Moved to AFLGW in 2017
Whitehorse Pioneers		Pioneers (formerly Suns)	Springfield Park, Box Hill North	1954	2014–2016	0	-	Moved to Northern FNL in 2017

==== Division 2 ====
Club	Colours	Nickname	Home Ground	Est.	Years in VWFL	VWFL Premierships		Fate
Club	Colours	Nickname	Home Ground	Est.	Years in VWFL	Total	Most Recent	Fate
Chirnside Park		Panthers	Kimberley Reserve, Chirnside Park	1978	2011-2016	0	-	Moved to South East Women's Football in 2017
Cranbourne reserves		Eagles	Frenken Homes Oval, Clyde North	1889	2009–2016	1	2015	Moved to South East Women's Football in 2017
Mordialloc		Bloodhounds	Ben Kavanagh Reserve, Mordialloc	1891	2014–2016	1	2002	Moved to Southern FNL in 2017
Seaford reserves		Tigerettes	RF Miles Recreation Reserve, Seaford	1921	2013–2016	1	2014	Moved to South East Women's Football in 2017
South Morang		Lions	Mill Park Lakes Recreation Reserve, South Morang	1954	2014–2016	1	2015	Moved to Northern FNL in 2017
St Kilda Sharks thirds		Sharks	Peanut Farm Reserve, St Kilda	1992	1992–2016	4	2014	Moved to South East Women's Football in 2017
Sunbury		Lions	Clarke Oval, Sunbury	1879	1981–2016	3	2015	Moved to WREDWFL in 2017
Western Spurs reserves (Note: Known as Sunshine YCW Spurs from 1993 to 1999, and St Albans Spurs from 2000 to 2015.)		Spurs	Henry Turner Memorial Reserve, Footscray	1993	1993–2016	3	2016	Moved to Northern FNL in 2017

==== Division 3 ====
Club	Colours	Nickname	Home Ground	Est.	Years in VWFL	VWFL Premierships		Fate
Club	Colours	Nickname	Home Ground	Est.	Years in VWFL	Total	Most Recent	Fate
AJAX		Jackas	Gary Smorgon Oval, St Kilda	1957	2015–2016	0	-	Moved to VAFA in 2017
Bayswater		Waters	Marie Wallace Bayswater Park, Bayswater	1895	2012–2016	0	-	Moved to ERWFC in 2017
Brunswick		Renegades	A.G. Gillon Oval, Brunswick	1963	2014–2016	0	-	Moved to VAFA in 2017
Fitzroy–ACU		Roy Girls	WT Peterson Oval, Fitzroy North	1883	2015–2016	0	-	Moved to VAFA in 2017
Gippsland		Galaxy	Traralgon Recreation Reserve, Traralgon	2015	2015–2016	2	2016	Moved to South East Women's Football in 2017
Melbourne University thirds		Mugars	Main Oval, University of Melbourne, Parkville	1996	1997–2015	5	2005	Moved to Northern FNL in 2017
SKOB		Saints	Basil Reserve, Malvern East	1947	2016	0	-	Moved to VAFA in 2017

==== Goldfields ====
Club	Colours	Nickname	Home Ground	Est.	Years in VWFL	VWFL Premierships		Fate
Club	Colours	Nickname	Home Ground	Est.	Years in VWFL	Total	Most Recent	Fate
Bacchus Marsh		Cobras	Maddingley Park, Maddingley	1979	2015-2016	0	-	Moved to AFLGW in 2017
East Point		Dragons	White Flat Recreation Reserve, Ballarat Central	2001	2016	0	-	Moved to AFLGW in 2017
Kyneton		Tigers	Kyneton Showgrounds, Kyneton	1861	2015–2016	0	-	Moved to NCWL in 2017
Lake Wendouree		Lakers	C E Brown Reserve, Wendouree	1994	2016	0	-	Moved to AFLGW in 2017
MCDFNL Lions		Lions	Carisbrook Recreation Reserve, Carisbrook	2016	2016	1	2016	Disbanded

==== North West ====
Club	Colours	Nickname	Home Ground	Est.	Years in VWFL	VWFL Premierships		Fate
Club	Colours	Nickname	Home Ground	Est.	Years in VWFL	Total	Most Recent	Fate
Fitzroy–ACU reserves		Roy Girls	WT Peterson Oval, Fitzroy North	1883	2015-2016	0	-	Moved to VAFA in 2017
Glen Orden		Hawks	Heathdale Reserve, Werribee	1979	2016	0	-	In recess
Jacana		Jaguars	Jacana Reserve, Jacana	1961	2013–2016	0	-	Folded
Manor Lakes		Storm	Howqua Way Reserve, Manor Lakes	2012	2014–2016	0	-	Moved to WREDWFL in 2017
Melton Central		Blues	Arnolds Creek Reserve, Melton West	1996	2007, 2014–2016	1	2007	Moved to AFLGW in 2017
Roxburgh Park		Magpies	Lakeside Reserve, Roxburgh Park	2002	2016	0	-	Moved to WREDWFL in 2017
Shepparton		Bears	Notre Dame College, Emmaus Campus, Shepparton North and John Gray Oval, Mooroopna	1880s	2016	0	-	Moved to NCWL in 2017

==== South East ====
Club	Colours	Nickname	Home Ground	Est.	Years in VWFL	VWFL Premierships		Fate
Club	Colours	Nickname	Home Ground	Est.	Years in VWFL	Total	Most Recent	Fate
Beaconsfield		Eagles	Holm Park, Beaconsfield	1890	2016	0	-	Moved to South East Women's Football in 2017
Edithvale Aspendale		Eagles	Regents Park, Aspendale	1921	2016	0	-	Moved to South East Women's Football in 2017
Endeavour Hills reserves		Eagles	Barry Simon Reserve, Endeavour Hills	2011	2015–2016	0	-	Moved to South East Women's Football in 2017
Hallam		Hawks	Hallam Recreation Reserve, Hallam	2012	2011–2016	2	2012	Moved to Southern FNL in 2017
Knox reserves		Falcons	Knox Gardens Reserve, Wantirna South	1980	2013–2016	0	-	Moved to VFLW in 2017
Mornington		Bulldogs	Alexandra Park, Mornington	1888	2014–2016	1	2016	Moved to South East Women's Football in 2017
Mount Eliza		Redlegs	Emil Madsden Reserve, Mount Eliza	1964	2016	0	-	Moved to South East Women's Football in 2017
Rosebud		Buds	Olympic Park, Rosebud	1929	2015–2016	0	-	In recess
Seaford thirds		Tigerettes	RF Miles Recreation Reserve, Seaford	1921	2013–2016	1	2014	Moved to South East Women's Football in 2017
Warragul Colts		Colts	Eastern Park, Warragul	1948	2016	0	-	Moved to South East Women's Football in 2017 as Warragul Industrials

=== Former clubs ===
Club	Colours	Nickname	Home Ground	Est.	Years in VWFL	VWFL Premierships		Fate
Club	Colours	Nickname	Home Ground	Est.	Years in VWFL	Total	Most Recent	Fate
Altona		Vikings	JK Grant Reserve, Altona	1918	2012-2013	0	-	In recess
Ballarat		Lions			1990–1995	3	1995	Folded
Bell Post Hill		Panthers	Myers Reserve, Bell Post Hill	1976	2010-2011	0	-	In recess
Berwick		Wickers	Edwin Flack Reserve, Berwick	1903	2004-2016	2	2006	Re-formed in Eastern FNL
Braybrook		Brookers	Pennell Reserve, Braybrook	1874	2010-2013	0	-	In recess
Corio		Devils	Shell Reserve, Corio	1974		0	-	In recess
Dingley		Cobras				1	1983	Folded
East Geelong		Eagles	Richmond Oval, East Geelong	1879		1	2002	In recess
Eastern Lions		Lions	Fairpark Reserve, Ferntree Gully	1969		1	2007	Re-formed in Eastern FNL
Ferntree Gully		Kangaroos	Wally Tew Reserve, Ferntree Gully	1892		1	2001	Re-formed in Eastern FNL
Geelong		Cheetahz	West Oval, Geelong West	1926		1	2006	Folded
Gembrook Cockatoo		Brookers	Gembrook Recreation Reserve, Gembrook	1906	2010-	0	-	In recess
Gladstone Park		Burras	Tullamarine Reserve, Tullamarine			1	1986	Folded
Golden Point		Dragons	White Flat Recreation Reserve, Ballarat Central		2014	0	-	Folded
Hadfield		Hawks	Martin Reserve, Hadfield	1961		1	2007	In recess
Heidelberg		Tigers	Warringal Park, Heidelberg	1876	?-2008	1	2008	Re-formed in Northern FNL
Keysborough		Burras	Rowley Allan Reserve, Keysborough	1947	2010-?	0	-	In recess
Lalor Park (Note: Known as Lalor Bloods from 2003 to 2008.)		Stars	JC Donath Reserve, Reservoir		2003-2012	1	2005	Folded after 2012 season
Melton		Bloods	MacPherson Park, Toolern Vale	1879	?-2009	0	-	Re-formed in Riddell District FNL
Montmorency		Magpies	Montmorency Park, North Oval, Montmorency	1924	2014-2015	1	2014	Re-formed in Northern FNL
North Ballarat		Roosters	Eureka Stadium, Wendouree	1882	?-2013	0	-	In recess
North Heidelberg		Bulldogs	Shelley Street Reserve, Heidelberg Heights	1958		1	2001	In recess
Northcote Park (Note: Known as Broadmeadows Scorpions from 1981 to 1983; Aberfeldie Scorpions from 1984 to 1986; Parkville Scorpions from 1987 to 1989; and East Brunswick Scorpions from 1990 to 1993.)		Scorpions		1981	1981–1994	10	1994	Folded
Northern Roos		Roos			c. 1992	0	-	Folded
North Geelong		Magpies	Osborne Park, North Geelong	1876	2012-2015	1	2014	Re-formed in AFL Barwon Female Football
Parkdale		Vultures	Gerry Green Reserve, Parkdale	c. 1970s	1995–2010	0	-	Re-formed in VAFA
Parkmore		Pirates	Frederick Wachter Reserve, Keysborough			0	-	Folded
Parkside (Note: Known as Albion Cats from 1995 to 1999.)		Magpies	Henry Turner Reserve, Footscray	1897	1995–2002	3	2001	Absorbed by Darebin
Port Melbourne		Borough	North Port Oval, Port Melbourne	1874		0	-	Re-formed in VFLW
Rowville		Cobras			1992–1994	0	-	Folded
Scoresby		Magpies	Scoresby Recreation Reserve, Scoresby	1925	1981-2012	3	2013	In recess
Seville Ranges		Rangers	Wandin East Recreation Reserve, Wandin East		2015	0	-	Folded
South Mornington		Tigers	Citation Oval, Mount Martha	2006	2006-2012	1	2010	In recess
St John's Old Collegians		JOCS	Thomas Carroll Reserve, Doveton	1991	2010-2013	0	-	In recess
Surrey Park		Panthers	Surrey Park Reserve, Box Hill	1994		1	2003	Re-formed in Eastern FNL
Wyndhamvale		Falcons	Wyndham Vale South Oval, Wyndham Vale	1979	2013-2014	0	-	Re-formed in Western Region FL
Yarra Valley Cougars		Cougars				3	2007	Folded

== Premiers ==
=== 2014–2016: Second multi-division era ===
Year	Premier	Division 1	Division 2	Division 3	Division 4	Division 5	North West (Note: Division was known as "West" in 2015.)	South East (Note: Division was known as "East" in 2015.)	Goldfields
2016	Deer Park	Kew	Seaford (R)	Gippsland	—N/a	—N/a	Manor Lakes	Mornington	MCDFNL Lions
2015	Darebin	Cranbourne	Port Melbourne Colts	Deer Park	South Morang	—N/a	Sunbury	Gippsland	—N/a
2014	Darebin	St Kilda Sharks (R)	North Geelong	Wyndhamvale	Montmorency	Seaford (R)	—N/a	—N/a	—N/a

=== 2006–2013: Location-based era ===
Year	Premier (Note: Division was known as "Division 1" in 2006.)	North West	South East	Country	Premier Reserves (Note: Division was known as "Division 1 Reserves" in 2006.)
2013	Darebin	Div 1: Bendigo	Scoresby	—N/a	Eastern Devils (R)
2013	Darebin	Div 2: Pascoe Vale	Scoresby	—N/a	Eastern Devils (R)
2012	Diamond Creek	Bendigo	Hallam	—N/a	St Albans (R)
2011	St Albans	La Trobe University	Hallam	—N/a	Darebin (R)
2010	Darebin	Sunbury	South Mornington	—N/a	Darebin (R)
2009	Darebin	Sunbury	Scoresby	—N/a	Darebin (R)
2008	Darebin	Heidelberg	Scoresby	—N/a	East Burwood (R)
2007	Darebin	Hadfield	Eastern Gully	Melton Centrals	Darebin (R)
2006	Darebin	Diamond Creek	Berwick	Geelong WSC	St Kilda City (R)

=== 1997–2005: First multi-division era ===
Year	Division 1	Division 2	Division 3	Div 1 Reserves
2005	Melbourne University	Lalor	Diamond Creek	Melbourne Uni (R)
2004	St Albans	St Kilda City	Berwick	—N/a
2003	Melbourne University	Melbourne Uni (R)	Surrey Park	—N/a
2002	Melbourne University	East Geelong	Mordialloc	—N/a
2001	Parkside Magpies	Hadfield	Ferntree Gully	—N/a
2000	Parkside Magpies	North Heidelberg	—N/a	—N/a
1999	St Kilda City	Airport West	—N/a	—N/a
1998	St Kilda City	Parkdale (R)	—N/a	—N/a
1997	Albion	St Kilda City (R)	—N/a	—N/a

=== 1981–1996: Single-division era ===
Year	Single division
1996	Fairfield
1995	Ballarat
1994	Northcote Park
1993	East Brunswick
1992	Ballarat
1991	East Brunswick
1990	Ballarat
1989	Parkville
1988	Parkville
1987	Parkville
1986	Gladstone Park
1985	Aberfeldie
1984	Aberfeldie
1983	Dingley
1982	Broadmeadows
1981	Broadmeadows

== Individual awards ==
=== League best and fairest ===
==== 2014–2016: Second multi-division era ====
Year	Premier (Helen Lambert Medal)	Division 1 (Fraser Griffiths Medal)	Division 2 (Kate Lawrence Medal)	Division 3	Division 4	Division 5	North West (Note: Division was known as "West" in 2015.)	South East (Note: Division was known as "East" in 2015.)	Goldfields
2016	Emma Grant (27) (Bendigo Thunder)	Rebecca Sadler (15) (Endeavour Hills)	Teagan Sheldon (25) (Seaford)	Sarah Jolly (23) (Gippsland)	—N/a	—N/a	Jaime Nankiville (21) (Melton Centrals)	Naomi Brisbane (19) (Seaford)	Jordan Ivey (21) (Lake Wendouree)
2016	Emma Grant (27) (Bendigo Thunder)	Rebecca Sadler (15) (Endeavour Hills)	Teagan Sheldon (25) (Seaford)	Sarah Jolly (23) (Gippsland)	—N/a	—N/a	Jaime Nankiville (21) (Melton Centrals)	Millie Shone (19) (Beaconsfield)	Jordan Ivey (21) (Lake Wendouree)
2015	Daisy Pearce (28) (Darebin Falcons)	Kate Gillespie-Jones (33) (Seaford)	Brooke Lochland (21) (Montmorency)	Natalie Cardamone (19) (Mordialloc)	Adele Brazenor (18) (Brunswick Renegades)	—N/a	Natasha Hardy (27) (Sunbury Lions)	Toni Hamilton (19) (AJAX)	—N/a
2015	Daisy Pearce (28) (Darebin Falcons)	Kate Gillespie-Jones (33) (Seaford)	Brooke Lochland (21) (Montmorency)	Samantha Radlof (19) (Deer Park)	Adele Brazenor (18) (Brunswick Renegades)	—N/a	Natasha Hardy (27) (Sunbury Lions)	Toni Hamilton (19) (AJAX)	—N/a
2014	Daisy Pearce (22) (Darebin Falcons)	Kristy Stratton (23) (Knox)	Kate Gillespie-Jones (21) (Seaford)	Samantha Radlof (28) (Deer Park)	Zoe Alston (19) (Bayswater)	Leisha Jungalwalla (18) (Brunswick Renegades)	—N/a	—N/a	—N/a

==== 2006–2013: Location-based era ====
Year	Premier (Note: Division was known as "Division 1" in 2006.) (Helen Lambert Medal)	North West (Kate Lawrence Medal)	South East (Kate Lawrence Medal)	Country (Kate Lawrence Medal)	Premier Reserves (Note: Division was known as "Division 1 Reserves" in 2006.) (Fraser Griffiths Medal)
2013	Daisy Pearce (Darebin Falcons)	Div 1: Natasha Hardy (28) (Sunbury Lions)	Naomi Brisbane (32) (Cranbourne)	—N/a	Natarsha Rappos (15) (Eastern Devils)
2013	Daisy Pearce (Darebin Falcons)	Div 2: Rachel Gastin (24) (Pascoe Vale)	Jaimee Lambert (32) (Keysborough)	—N/a	Natarsha Rappos (15) (Eastern Devils)
2012	Lou Wotton (25) (Eastern Devils)	Richelle Cranston (21) (North Ballarat)	Hannah Scott (20) (Hallam)	—N/a	Rachel Gullo (15) (St Albans Spurs)
2011	Daisy Pearce (Darebin Falcons)	Richelle Cranston (North Ballarat)	Kerry Trevillian (St John's OC)	—N/a	Natasha Hardy (Sunbury Lions)
2010	Daisy Pearce (19) (Darebin Falcons)	Kerry Anderson (21) (South Mornington)	Samantha Radlof (24) (Sunbury Lions)	—N/a	Belinda Bowey (19) (St Kilda City Sharks)
2010	Lou Wotton (19) (East Burwood Devils)	Kerry Anderson (21) (South Mornington)	Samantha Radlof (24) (Sunbury Lions)	—N/a	Belinda Bowey (19) (St Kilda City Sharks)
2009	Daisy Pearce (Darebin Falcons)	Belinda Hateley (Melton Centrals)	Melissa Kuys (Scoresby)	—N/a	Rebecca Hickmott (Darebin Falcons)
2009	Daisy Pearce (Darebin Falcons)	Alana Tully (Geelong Panthers)	Melissa Kuys (Scoresby)	—N/a	Rebecca Hickmott (Darebin Falcons)
2008	Cecilia McIntosh (Melbourne University)	Karen Paxman (Heidelberg)	Melissa Kuys (Scoresby)	—N/a	Kristy Baeffel (St Kilda City Sharks)
2008	Cecilia McIntosh (Melbourne University)	Karen Paxman (Heidelberg)	Katie Loynes (Berwick)	—N/a	Kristy Baeffel (St Kilda City Sharks)
2007	Shannon McFerran (St Albans Spurs)	Amanda Walsh (Heidelberg)	Melissa Kuys (Eastern Gully)	Sarah Welsh (Corio)	Luisa Callegari (Darebin Falcons)
2006	Shannon McFerran (St Albans Spurs)	Karen Paxman (Hadfield)	Romy Pearton (South Mornington)	Daniela Minutoli (Geelong WSC)	Jessica Williams (Melbourne University)

==== 1997–2005: First multi-division era ====
Year	Division 1 (Helen Lambert Medal)	Division 2	Division 3	Div 1 Reserves (Fraser Griffiths Medal)
2005	Shannon McFerran (24) (St Albans Spurs)	Karen Paxman (18) (Lalor)	Rebecca Erwin (26) (North Heidelberg)	Jessica Williams (16) (Melbourne University)
2004	Meg Hutchins (Deakin University Devils)	Emma Lynch (North Ballarat)	Rebecca Erwin (North Heidelberg)	—N/a
2003	Shannon McFerran (St Albans Spurs)	Natalie Cardamone (Mordialloc)	Jessica Lees (Surrey Park)	—N/a
2002	Shannon McFerran (St Albans Spurs)	Samantha Young (East Geelong)	Emma Lynch (Mount Clear)	—N/a
2001	Debbie Lee (St Albans Spurs)	Samantha Young (East Geelong)	Shelley Beggs (Boronia)	—N/a
2000	Sharon Bonnici (St Kilda City Sharks)	Joanne Hood (North Heidelberg)	—N/a	—N/a
1999	Sharon Bonnici (St Kilda City Sharks)		—N/a	—N/a
1998	Doreen De Pasquale (St Kilda City Sharks)		—N/a	—N/a
1997	Bronwyn Hutchinson (Fairfield Falcons)		—N/a	—N/a

==== 1981–1996: Single-division era ====
Year	Single division (Helen Lambert Medal)
1996	Debbie Lee (Sunshine YCW Spurs)
1995	Debbie Lee (Sunshine YCW Spurs)
1994	Debbie Lee (Sunshine YCW Spurs)
1994	Doreen De Pasquale (St Kilda City)
1993	Debbie Lee (Sunshine YCW Spurs)
1992	Kris Gardiner (Fairfield Falcons)
1991	Bronwyn Hutchinson (Ballarat Lions)
1990	Rhonda Rumler (Ballarat Eagles)
1989	Lisa Hardeman (Parkville Scorpions)
1988	Bernie Marantelli (Parkville Scorpions)
1987	Bernie Marantelli (Parkville Scorpions)
1986	Tracey Winch (Ferntree Gully)
1985	Siobhan Taylor (Gladstone Park)
1984	Maree Cave (Broadmeadows Scorpions)
1983	Maree Cave (Broadmeadows Scorpions)
1982	Not awarded
1981	Not awarded

=== Leading goal kicker (Rohenna Young Medal) ===
All leading goal kickers were presented with the Rohenna Young Medal regardless of division.

==== 2014–2016: Second multi-division era ====
Year	Premier	Division 1	Division 2	Division 3	Division 4	Division 5	North West (Note: Division was known as "West" in 2015.)	South East (Note: Division was known as "East" in 2015.)	Goldfields
2016	Bella Ayre (34) (Bendigo Thunder)	Gabrielle Mahoney (37) (Kew Bears)	Lisa Kirby (36) (Sunbury Lions)	Sarah Jolly (36) (Gippsland)	—N/a	—N/a	Jaime Nankiville (42) (Melton Centrals)	Katie Angelis (44) (Beaconsfield)	Tylah Bruhn (35) (Lake Wendouree)
2015	Moana Hope (66) (St Kilda Sharks)	Chanelle Slater (Knox)	Deanna Berry (Montmorency)	Natalie Cardamone (Mordialloc)	Esther Hassett (Brunswick Renegades)	—N/a	Lisa Kirby (Sunbury Lions)	Rachel Drennan (Gippsland)	—N/a
2014	Moana Hope (81) (St Kilda Sharks)	Kirsten McLeod (27) (Cranbourne)	Alisha Habib (43) (North Geelong)	Jess Cameron (55) (Wyndhamvale)	Rebecca Erwin (16) (Montmorency)	Esther Hassett (16) (Brunswick Renegades)	—N/a	—N/a	—N/a

==== 2006–2013: Location-based era ====
Year	Premier (Note: Division was known as "Division 1" in 2006.)	North West	South East	Country	Premier Reserves (Note: Division was known as "Division 1 Reserves" in 2006.)
2013	Stephanie Brown (25) (Berwick)	Div 1: Samantha Greene (37) (La Trobe University)	Michelle Densley (69) (St John's OC)	—N/a	Georgia Hammond (37) (Darebin Falcons)
2013	Stephanie Brown (25) (Berwick)	Div 2: Amanda Laidlaw (35) (Pascoe Vale)	Michelle Densley (69) (St John's OC)	—N/a	Georgia Hammond (37) (Darebin Falcons)
2012	Amy Catterall (39) (St Albans Spurs)	Samantha Greene (42) (La Trobe University)	Elana De Santis (42) (Hallam)	—N/a	Lauren Chalkley (19) (Berwick)
2012	Amy Catterall (39) (St Albans Spurs)	Samantha Greene (42) (La Trobe University)	Elana De Santis (42) (Hallam)	—N/a	Rebecca Hickmott (19) (Darebin Falcons)
2011	Sarah D'Arcy (49) (East Burwood Devils)	Samantha Greene (26) (La Trobe University)	Elana De Santis (27) (Hallam)	—N/a	Melissa Beadles (24) (East Burwood Devils)
2010	Jane Lange (52) (Darebin Falcons)	Tahnee Schulz (31) (Lalor Park)	Elise Bonar (30) (Parkdale Vultures)	—N/a	Rebecca Hickmott (31) (Darebin Falcons)
2009	Brittany Grech (58) (Diamond Creek)	Emma Kent (42) (North Ballarat)	Melissa Kuys (34) (Scoresby)	—N/a	Rebecca Hickmott (39) (Darebin Falcons)
2008	Moana Hope (63) (Darebin Falcons)	Selina Caruana (45) (Heidelberg)	Aimee Buchan (38) (Berwick)	—N/a	Kristy Turner (42) (East Burwood Devils)
2007	Moana Hope (67) (Darebin Falcons)	Selina Caruana (22) (Heidelberg)	Rebecca Ouchirenko (24) (Eastern Gully)	Michelle Wiles (60) (Corio)	Louise Potter (49) (Darebin Falcons)
2006	Moana Hope (74) (Darebin Falcons)	Jessica Dudley (37) (Heidelberg)	Cassie Bell (40) (Eastern Gully)	Belinday Ousley (12) (Geelong WSC)	Ivanna Hearn (32) (St Kilda City Sharks)
2006	Moana Hope (74) (Darebin Falcons)	Hayley Sanders (37) (Hadfield)	Cassie Bell (40) (Eastern Gully)	Belinday Ousley (12) (Geelong WSC)	Ivanna Hearn (32) (St Kilda City Sharks)

==== 1997–2005: First multi-division era ====
Year	Division 1	Division 2	Division 3	Div 1 Reserves
2005	Rebecca Jennings (45) (Melbourne University)	Rebecca Ouchirenko (26) (Eastern Gully)	Stacey Cross (68) (Diamond Creek)	Paige Smith (30) (Darebin Falcons)
2004	Rohenna Young (65) (St Albans Spurs)	Natalie Cardamone (34) (St Kilda City Sharks)	Melissa Egan (Corio)	—N/a
2004	Rohenna Young (65) (St Albans Spurs)	Sally Wenn (34) (St Kilda City Sharks)	Melissa Egan (Corio)	—N/a
2003	Nic Lalor (33) (Deakin University Devils)	Natalie Cardamone (Mordialloc)	Chelsea Davey (TBC)	—N/a
2002	Anita Rhook (Parkside)	Kerry Saunders (Parkside)	Emma Lynch (Mount Clear)	—N/a
2001	Dee Dundov (St Albans Spurs)	Kerry Saunders (Parkside)		—N/a
2000	Nic Lalor (St Kilda City Sharks)		—N/a	—N/a
1999	Nic Lalor (St Kilda City Sharks)		—N/a	—N/a
1998	Nic Lalor (St Kilda City Sharks)		—N/a	—N/a
1997	Nic Lalor (St Kilda City Sharks)		—N/a	—N/a

==== 1981–1996: Single-division era ====
Year	Single division
1996	Debbie Lee (Sunshine YCW Spurs)
1995	Yasmin Horsham (Ballarat Lions)
1994	Bronwyn Hutchinson (Ballarat Lions)
1993	
1992	
1991	
1990	
1989	
1988	
1987	
1986	
1985	
1984	
1983	
1982	
1981	

=== Best on ground in grand final ===
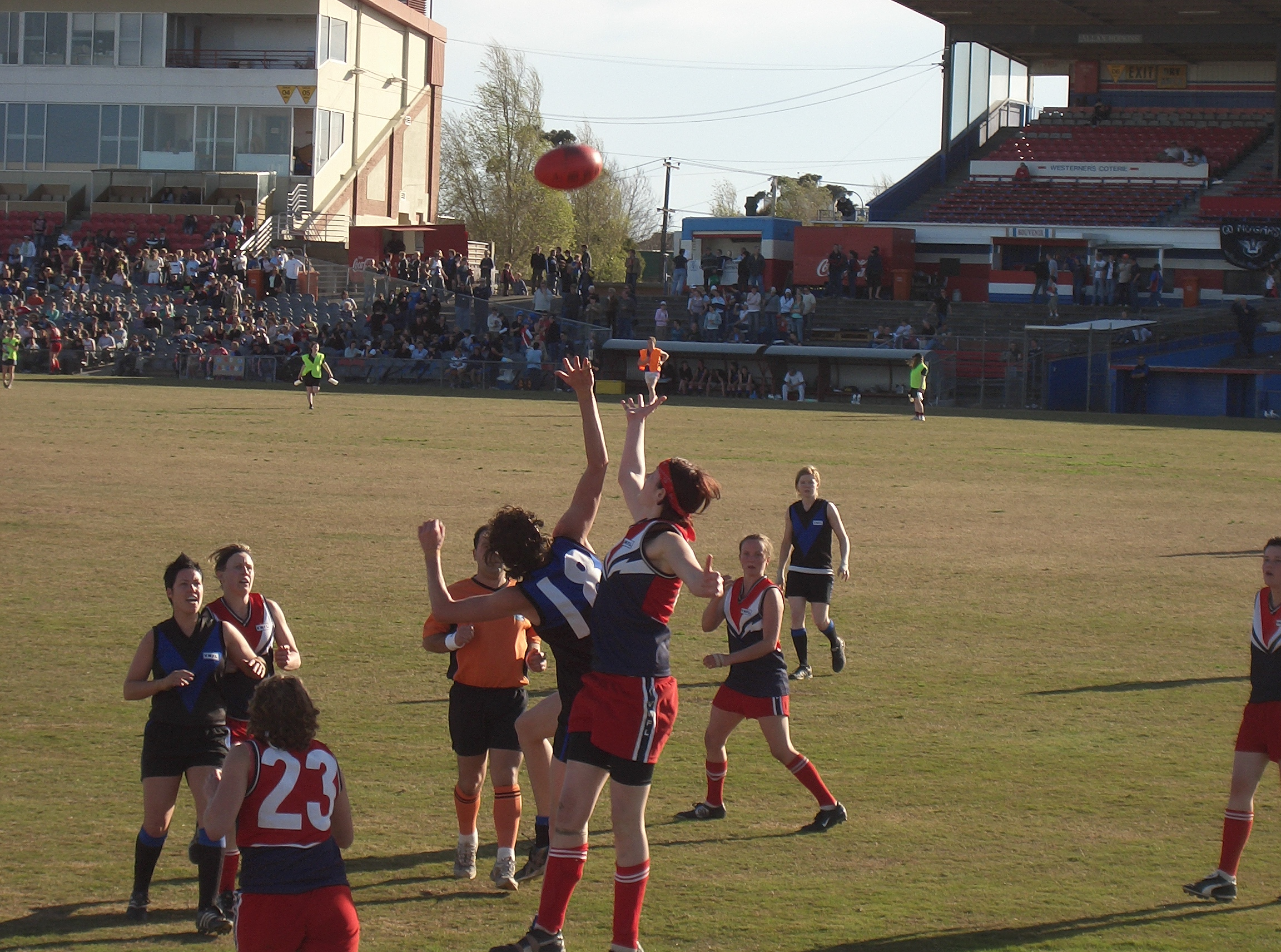
The rucks reach for the ball after the umpire (in orange) has balled it up.

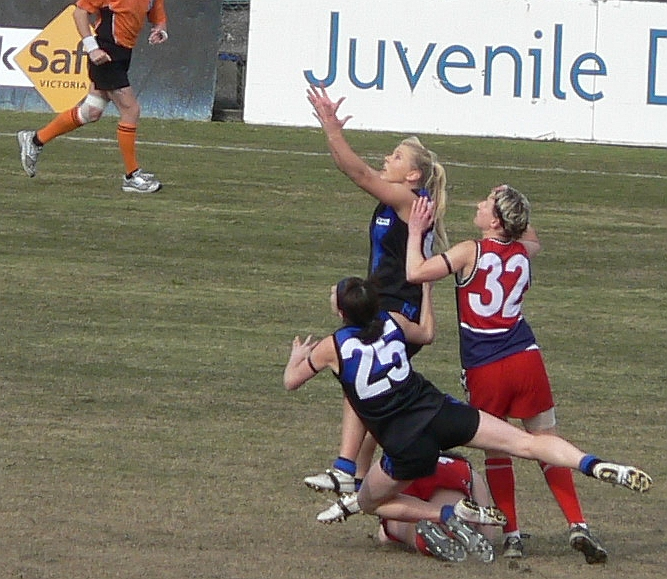
A Melbourne University player jostles for best position in a marking contest.

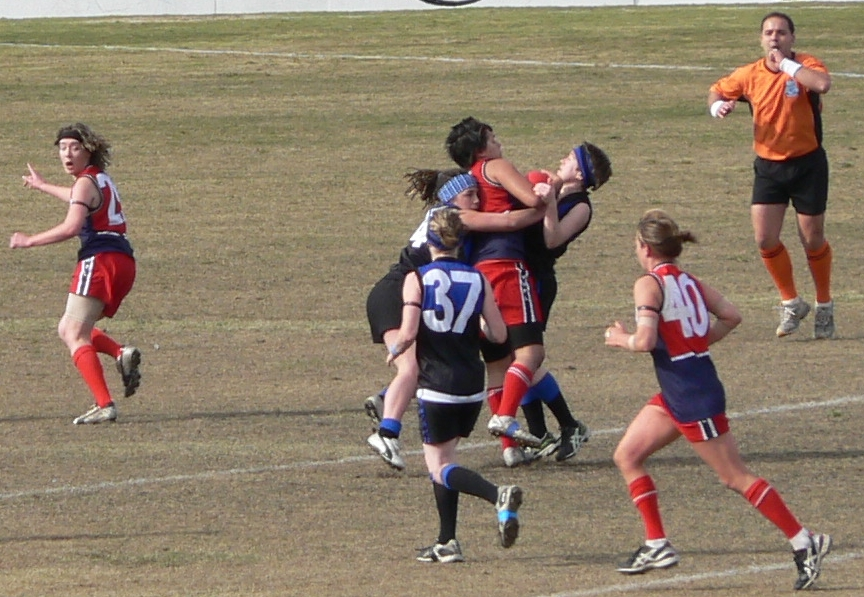
A Darebin Falcons player is wrapped up in a gang tackle by two Melbourne University opponents in the 2006 WVFL senior women's Grand Final.

==== Division One/Premier Division ====
Year	Lisa Hardeman Medal (Best on Ground in Grand Final)
2016	Brooke McKinley (Deer Park)
2015	Darcy Vescio (Darebin)
2014	Daisy Pearce (Darebin)
2013	Melissa Hickey (Darebin)
2012	Kirsty Lamb (Diamond Creek)
2011	Karen Paxman (St Albans)
2010	Aasta O'Connor (Darebin)
2009	Sarah Hammond (Darebin)
2008	Moana Hope (Darebin)
2007	Roi Boutsikakis (Darebin)
2006	Kathy Zacharopolous (Darebin)
2005	Daisy Pearce (Darebin)
2004	Debbie Lee (St Albans)
2003	
2002	
2001	Rohenna Young (Parkside)
2000	
1999	
1998	
1997	
1996	
1995	
1994	
1993	
1992	
1991	Debbie Lee (East Brunswick)
1990	
1989	
1988	
1987	
1986	
1985	
1984	
1983	
1982	
1981	

==== Premier Reserves ====
Year	Best on Ground in Grand Final
2013	
2012	Rachael Gullo (St Albans)
2011	Gemma Anderson (Darebin)
2010	Laura Cartledge (East Burwood)
2009	
2008	
2007	
2006	
2005	

=== Life membership ===
2009 Leesa Catto
2009 Bron McGorlick
2008 Kerryn Stephen
2006 Chyloe Kurdas
2005 Di Smith
2004 Belinda Bowey
2003 Sal Rees, Rohenna Young
2002 Debbie Lee, Kerry Saunders
2001 Nicole Graves
2000 Lisa Hardeman
1999 Ann Rulton
1998 Julie Allen
1997 Dianne Vaux
1996 Bernadette Marantelli
1995 Coral White
1990 Jan Wilson, Janet Graham
1983 Helen Lambert

== See also ==
- List of women's Australian rules football leagues
