= Moana Hope =

Australian rules footballer

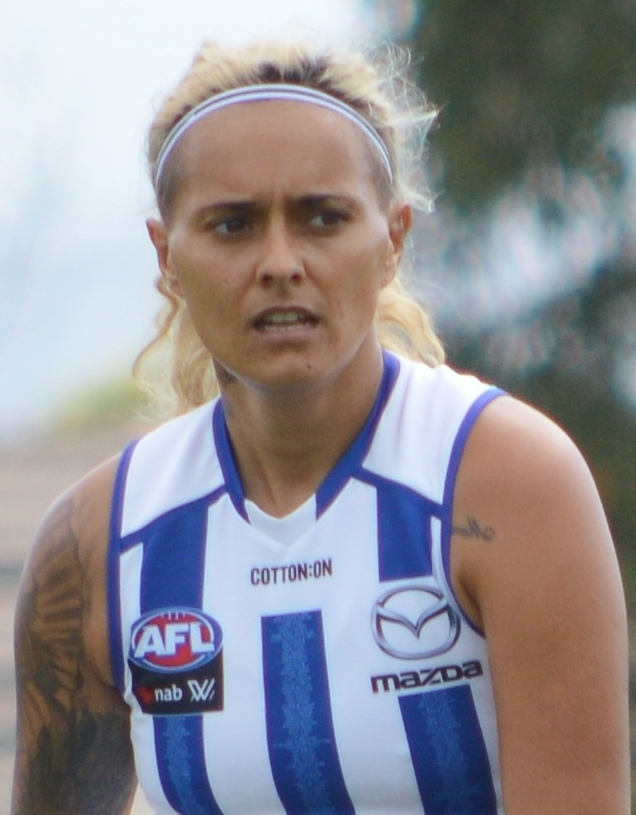
- Hope in 2019

Personal information
- Nickname: Mo
- Born: 14 February 1988 (age 38); Victoria
- Original team: St Kilda Sharks (VWFL)
- Draft: Marquee player signing 2016: Collingwood
- Debut: Round 1, 2017, Collingwood vs. Carlton, at IKON Park
- Height: 172 cm (5 ft 8 in)
- Position: Full-forward

Playing career^{1}
Years	Club	Games (Goals)
2017–2018	Collingwood	13 (15)
2019	North Melbourne	7 (8)
Total		20 (23)

Representative team honours^{2}
Years	Team	Games (Goals)
2017	Victoria	1 (1)

International team honours^{2}
2006	Australia	
- ^{1} Playing statistics correct to the end of the 2019 season.^{2} Representative statistics correct as of 2017.

Career highlights
- Collingwood leading goalkicker: 2017; North Melbourne leading goalkicker: 2019

Moana Hope (born 14 February 1988) is a former professional Australian rules footballer who played in the AFL Women's competition from 2017 to 2019, including 13 matches over two seasons at Collingwood and a further seven matches over one season at North Melbourne. Each followed an extended career at state-league level before the creation of a national league.

== Early life ==
Hope was born on 14 February 1988 in Victoria, Australia and was raised from the suburb of Broadmeadows, in Melbourne's north. Her parents migrated from New Zealand and she has Māori heritage from her mother's side and she also has German and Australian heritage, with 14 siblings in total.

Hope began playing Australian football competitively at the age of seven, playing with boys teams at Glenroy through under-12s. Without a viable youth girls league to join, Hope immediately progressed to playing senior women's football with Hadfield at the age of thirteen. She played representative football for Victoria at age 16, and captained the state side at under-19 level. She was also a member of the Australia women's international rules football team that played against Ireland in the 2006 Ladies' International Rules Series.

Hope was also an accomplished junior cricketer, representing Victoria through to under-19 level. She chose to give up the sport in favour of Australian football.

== State league football ==
Hope has played premier division Australian football in the VWFL for the Darebin Falcons and St Kilda Sharks. She is a multiple competition leading goalkicker. She has also played for Melbourne University.

Hope ceased playing Australian football in 2011 after an accomplished period in the VWFL; in 2013, she witnessed the first AFL women's exhibition match and recommitted to football as a result, and was drafted with the eleventh selection the following year to the Western Bulldogs. She would go on to play for the club in representative exhibition matches for the next three years. In 2016, she kicked six goals in the victorious Western Bulldogs side against Melbourne in the women's all-stars game in September.

In the 2016 season she kicked over 100 goals, the first ever player to do so in the VFL Women's.

== AFL Women career ==
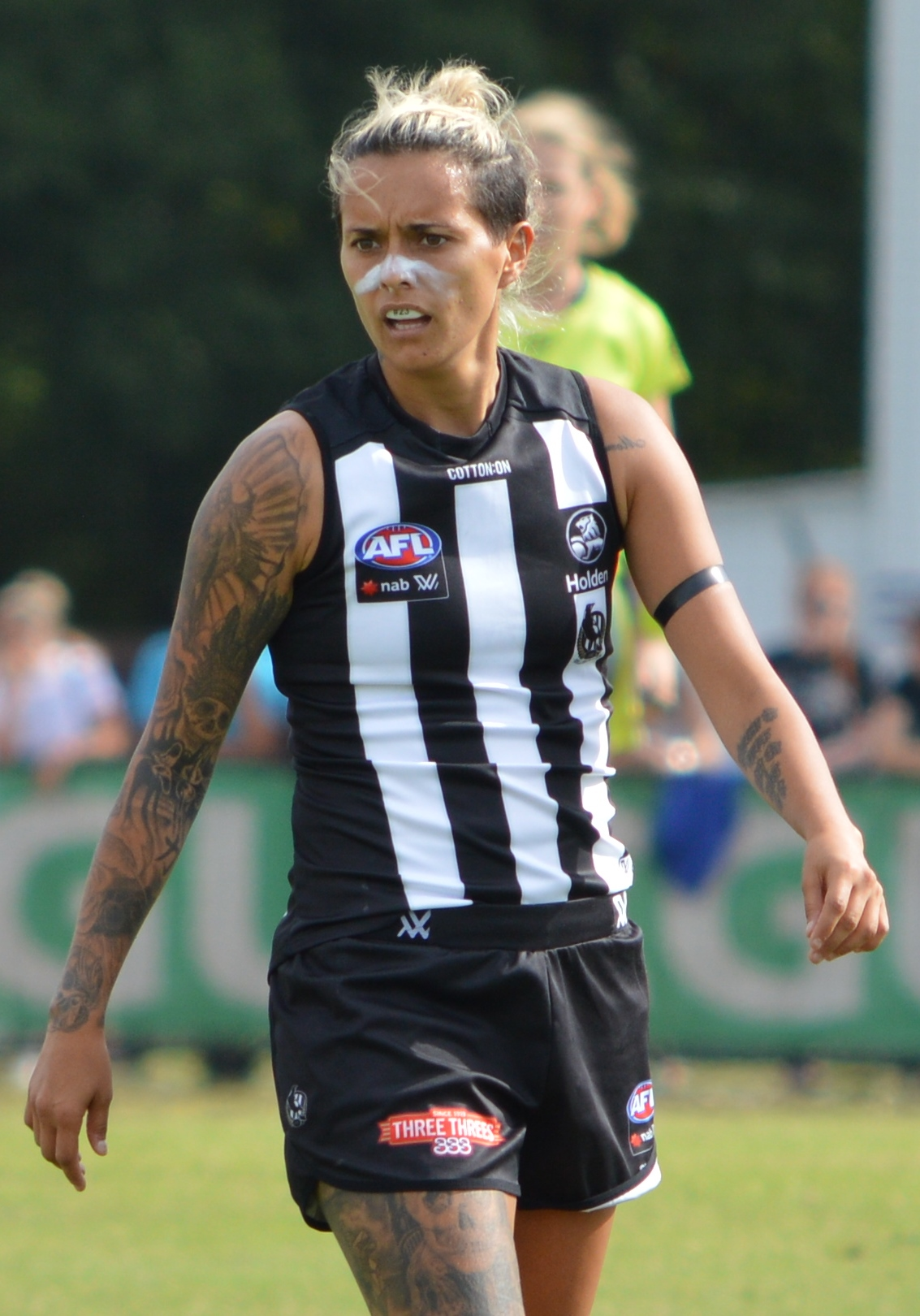
Hope in 2018, during the AFL Women's match between Collingwood and Greater Western Sydney

In July 2016, Hope was signed by Collingwood as one of two marquee players ahead of the AFL Women's inaugural season.

She made her debut in round 1 in the club and the league's inaugural match at Ikon Park against Carlton. Hope finished the season having played in all seven of Collingwood's matches and kicking seven goals, leading the Magpies' goalkicking and equal sixth-highest league-wide. Hope was later re-signed for the 2018 season in the May 2017 trade period. In late August she was added as an injury replacement player in the Victorian side for the upcoming State of Origin exhibition match. She kicked one goal in her state's 97-point win over The Allies.

Hope returned to Collingwood's side for round 1 2018 in an eight-point loss to Carlton at Ikon Park. After a disappointing personal performance she was dropped from the club's round 2 side to face Fremantle at Optus Stadium the following week.

On 18 May 2018, it was announced that Hope had been signed by North Melbourne, who entered the AFL Women's competition in 2019. In April 2019, North Melbourne announced that they had delisted Hope following the conclusion of the 2019 season.

== Statistics ==
Legend
G	Goals	K	Kicks	D	Disposals	T	Tackles
B	Behinds	H	Handballs	M	Marks

Season	Team	No.	Games	Totals							Averages (per game)						
Season	Team	No.	Games	G	B	K	H	D	M	T	G	B	K	H	D	M	T
2017	Collingwood	23	7	7	8	29	7	36	14	6	1.0	1.1	4.1	1.0	5.1	2.0	0.9
2018	Collingwood	23	6	8	5	41	11	52	17	5	1.3	0.8	6.8	1.8	8.7	2.8	0.8
2019	North Melbourne	23	7	8	4	33	7	40	16	8	1.1	0.6	4.7	1.0	5.7	2.3	1.1
Career			20	23	17	103	25	128	47	19	1.2	0.9	5.2	1.3	6.4	2.4	1.0

== Television ==
=== Australian Survivor ===
In 2018, Hope appeared as a contestant on Australian Survivor: Champions vs. Contenders, competing in the fifth season of the competitive reality television series Australian Survivor as part of the Champions tribe. Hope formed many strong relationships, notably with fellow contestants Mat Rogers and Sharn Coombes and also found a Hidden Immunity Idol. In the tribe's first tribal council, Hope led the blindside of American Survivor contestant Russell Hantz. On day 16, Hope asked her tribemates to vote her out at tribal council because of an illness. The tribe followed through on Hope's request and she finished the game in 19th place.

Hope returned for Australian Survivor: All Stars and got far into the game, forming an alliance with the extremely popular eventual winner David Genat. However, she repeatedly refused to vote out Genat, who was the sole vote to remove her from the game at final 3, leaving Hope in third place.

=== Filmography ===
Year	Title	Role	Notes
2018	Australian Survivor: Champions vs. Contenders	Contestant	Eliminated; 19th place
2020	Australian Survivor: All Stars	Contestant	Eliminated; 3rd place

== Personal life ==
Hope published her memoir, My Way, in 2017.

On 17 August 2019, Hope married model Isabella Carlstrom in Melbourne. Carlstrom gave birth to their first child on 17 November 2020, Hope gave birth to a boy on 26 June 2022.

In September 2023, she revealed that she was in a relationship with Maria Thattil. They announced their split in February 2025.
