= Debbie Lee =

Australian rules footballer and coach

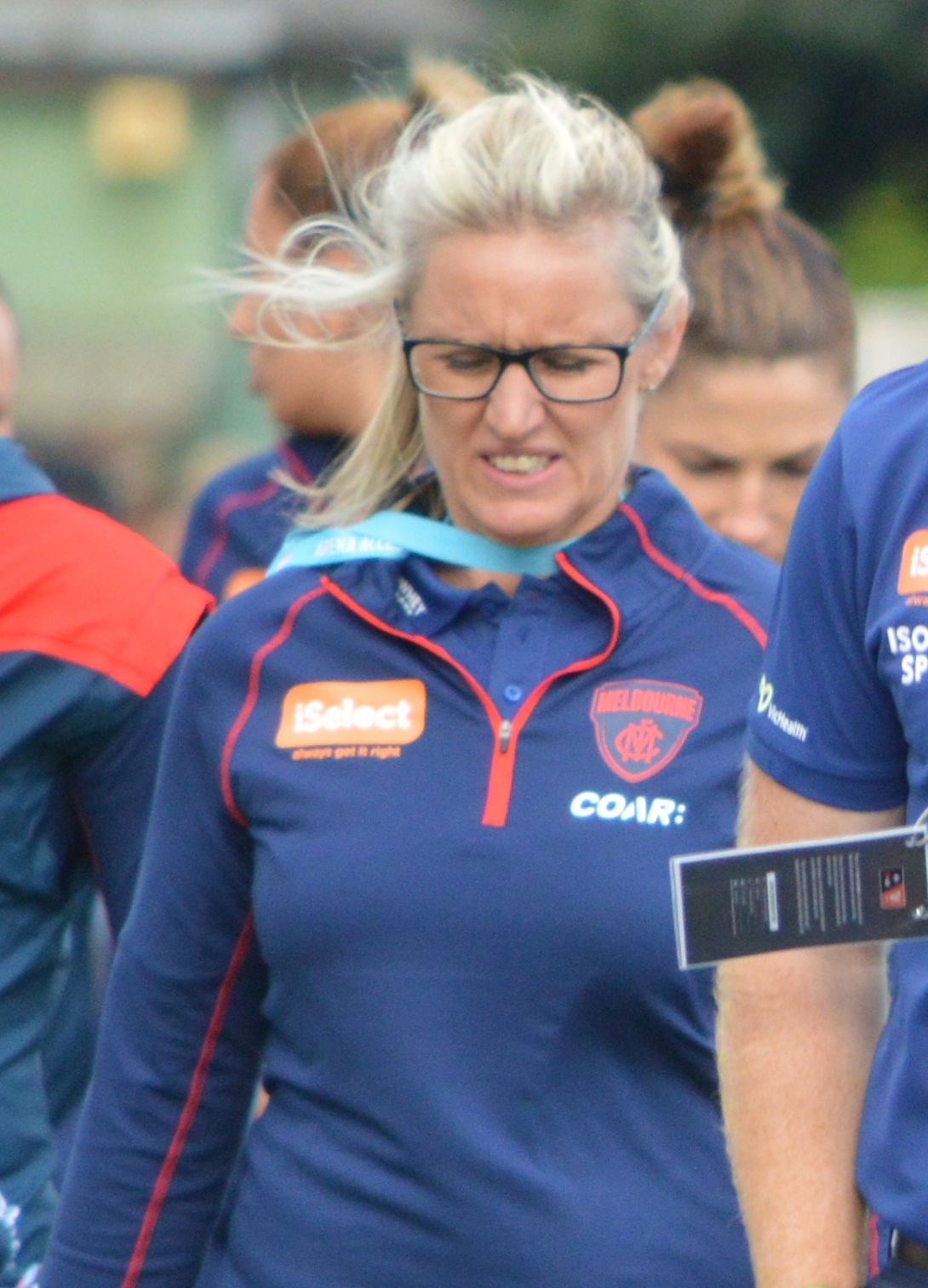
- Lee in February 2017

Personal information
- Full name: Deborah Lee
- Born: 1974 (age 51–52)

Playing career
Years	Club	Games (Goals)
1991–1992	East Brunswick Scorpions	
1993–2014	Sunshine YCW/St Albans Spurs	
Total		302

Representative team honours
Years	Team	Games (Goals)
	Victoria	16

Coaching career^{3}
Years	Club	Games (W–L–D)
1997	Sunshine YCW Spurs	
2009–2012	St Albans Spurs	
2015–2017	Western Spurs	
2017	Representative; Victoria	1 (1–0–0)
- ^{3} Coaching statistics correct as of 2017.

Career highlights
- Playing: 3× VWFL premiership player: 1991, 2004, 2011; VWFL premiership captain: 2004; 5× Helen Lambert Medal: 1993, 1994 (tied), 1995, 1996, 2001; Lisa Hardeman Medal: 2004; 6× All-Australian team; 6× Sunshine YCW/St Albans Spurs best and fairest: 1993, 1994, 1995, 1996, 2001, 2010; Sunshine YCW/St Albans Spurs captain: 1993–2004; 6× Victoria captain; 2× E. J. Whitten Medal; Coaching: VWFL premiership coach: 2011; Administration: VWFL president: 2004–2012; Football Woman of the Year Award: 2009; Sunshine YCW Spurs founder: 1993; Hall of Fame: Australian Football Hall of Fame: inducted 2021; Australian Football League life membership: awarded 2020; VWFL life membership: awarded 2002

Deborah Lee (born 1974) is a former Australian rules football player and coach.

She has campaigned for recognition of women's Australian rules football in Australia, giving up a WNBL career to focus on developing the sport.

She was later appointed president of the Victorian Women's Football League (VWFL).

Apart from being the president of the VWFL, she played for the St Albans Spurs. She first played in 1990 with the East Brunswick Scorpions before forming her own club in 1992, the Spurs. Hall won the Helen Lambert Medal as the Victorian women's competition best and fairest five times and was an All-Australian named player six times.

Lee worked as the head of the Melbourne Football Club's AFL Women's operations in 2017 before leaving to take up the same role with the Western Bulldogs in 2018. She was at the same time appointed as the club's VFLW coach for the 2018 season. A key initiative of Lee's were the Melbourne–Western Bulldogs exhibition matches that ultimately paved the way for the formation of the AFLW.

Lee was the first-ever female inductee to the Australian Football Hall of Fame in 2021 for her playing excellence and for being the driving force for women's AFL.
