= Richelle Cranston =

Australian rules footballer

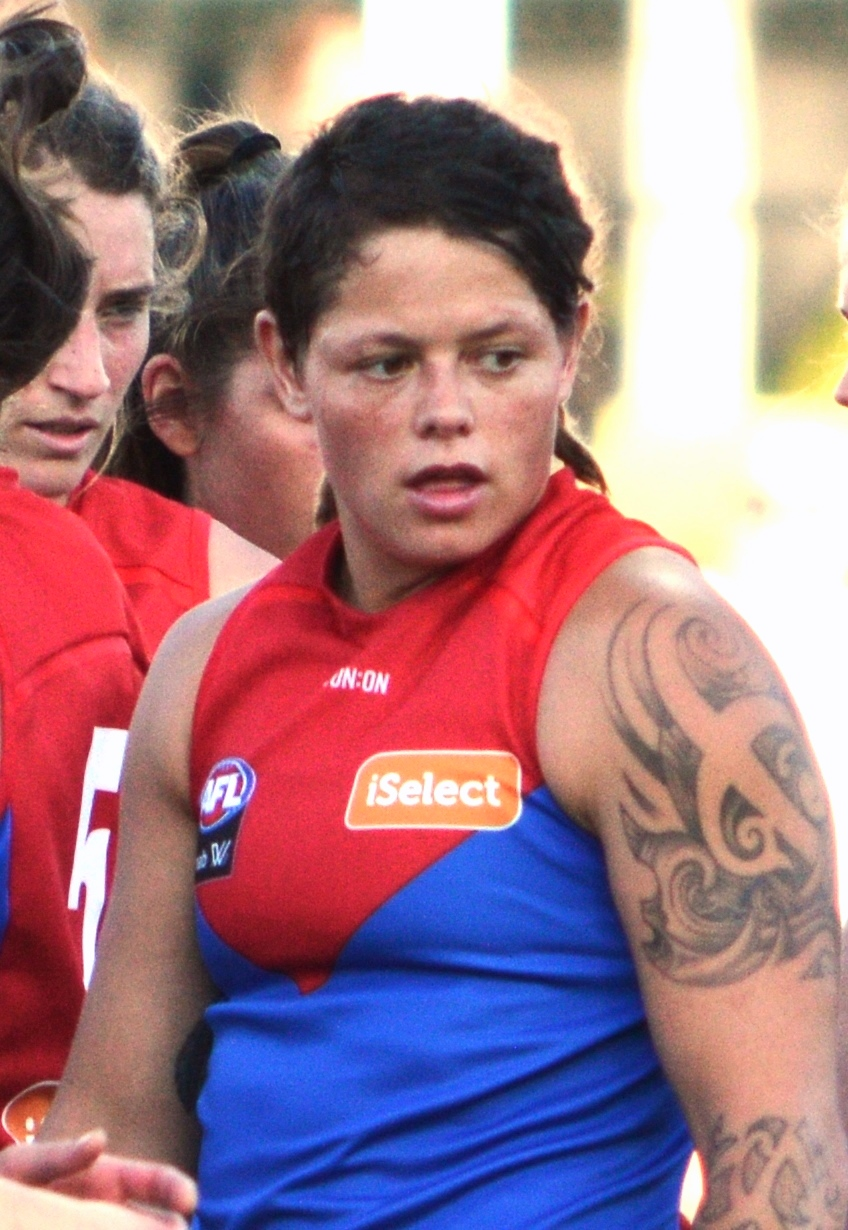
- Cranston in February 2018

Personal information
- Nickname: Rocky
- Born: 25 September 1989 (age 37)
- Original team: Geelong (VWFL)
- Draft: No. 24, 2016 AFL Women's draft
- Debut: Round 1, 2017, Melbourne vs. Brisbane, at Casey Fields
- Height: 171 cm (5 ft 7 in)
- Position: Forward

Playing career
Years	Club	Games (Goals)
2017–2018	Melbourne	13 (6)
2019–2021	Geelong	21 (11)
2022 (S6)–2023	Western Bulldogs	26 (14)
Total		60 (31)

Career highlights
- 2× Geelong leading goalkicker: 2020, 2021

Richelle Cranston (born 28 September 1989) is a former Australian rules footballer who played for Melbourne, Geelong and the Western Bulldogs in the AFL Women's (AFLW).

== Early life ==
Cranston grew up in New Zealand and later in Maryborough, Victoria to New Zealand parents. She has Maori heritage and grew up playing American football.

She did not begin playing Australian Football until Year 12. In 2011, she started with the North Ballarat Football Club and won the Kate Lawrence Medal in 2011 and 2012. She kicked 39 goals in her second season with the club playing at full forward. Cranston went on to represent Vic Country in 2014.

Cranston played senior gridiron with the Geelong Buccaneers as a fullback and tailback. She was the MVP for Gridiron Victoria in 2015 and was part of the team's back to back Vic Bowl sides and was their most valuable player in 2016. She also represented Victoria in the state's first ever representative women's team and made national selection.

She also played for North Geelong Football Club and later for the Western Bulldogs team from 2016/17 during the trial matches prior to the commencement of the AFLW.

== AFLW career ==
Cranston was drafted by Melbourne with their third selection and twenty-fourth overall in the 2016 AFL Women's draft. She made her debut in the fifteen-point loss to Brisbane at Casey Fields in the opening round of the 2017 season. She was suspended for one match after her debut match due to front on contact with Brisbane's Jamie Stanton. After returning from suspension, she played every match for the year to finish with six games.

Melbourne signed Cranston for the 2018 season during the trade period in May 2017.

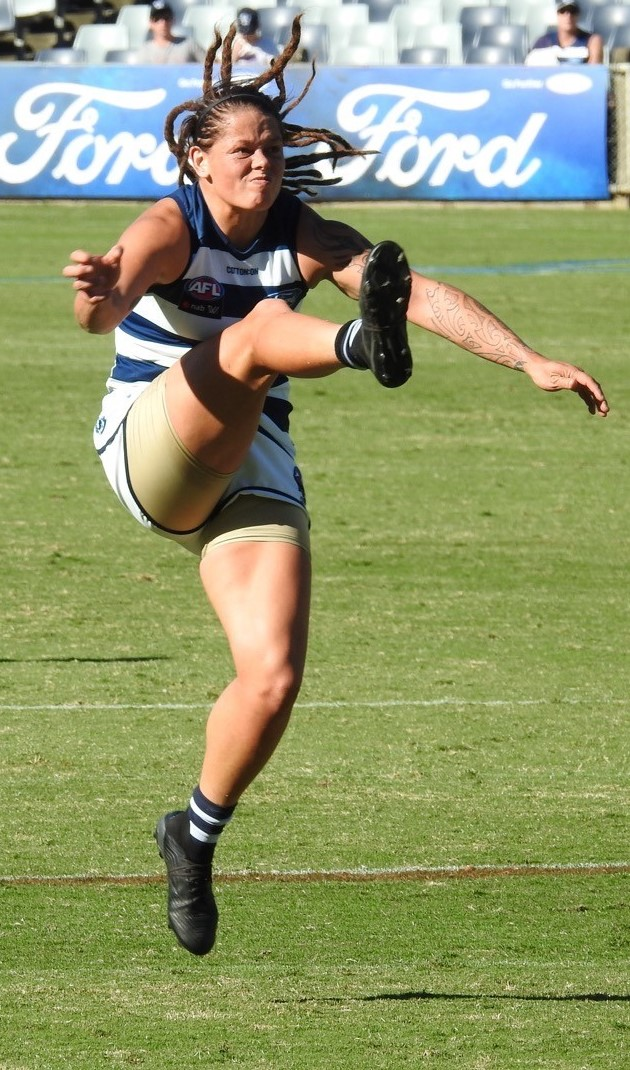
Cranston playing for Geelong, February 2019

In May 2018 Cranston accepted an offer from expansion club Geelong to play with the club in the 2019 AFLW season. Cranston also played for Geelong's VFL Women's team for the 2018 season, and she won the club's 2018 best and fairest award.

In June 2021, Cranston was delisted by Geelong. A fortnight later, she was signed by the Western Bulldogs as a delisted free agent. She kept her preferred number of #30 as her guernsey number.

She retired at the end of the 2023 season, having played 60 AFLW games and scored 31 goals.

== Statistics ==
Statistics are correct to the end of the 2021 season.

Legend
G	Goals	K	Kicks	D	Disposals	T	Tackles
B	Behinds	H	Handballs	M	Marks

Season	Team	No.	Games	Totals							Averages (per game)							Votes
Season	Team	No.	Games	G	B	K	H	D	M	T	G	B	K	H	D	M	T	Votes
2017	Melbourne	30	6	1	3	25	19	44	9	18	0.2	0.5	4.2	3.2	7.3	1.5	3.0	0
2018	Melbourne	30	7	5	4	51	19	70	17	26	0.7	0.6	7.3	2.7	10.0	2.4	3.7	4
2019	Geelong	30	6	1	3	62	32	94	13	27	0.2	0.5	10.3	5.3	15.7	2.2	4.5	3
2020	Geelong	30	6	5	4	46	37	83	12	16	0.8	0.7	7.7	6.2	13.8	2.0	2.7	2
2021	Geelong	30	9	5	2	47	16	63	12	17	0.6	0.2	5.2	1.8	7.0	1.3	1.9	0
2022 (S6)	Western Bulldogs	30	10	5	1	51	27	78	18	28	0.5	0.1	5.1	2.7	7.8	1.8	2.8	0
2022 (S7)	Western Bulldogs	30	11	7	7	61	24	85	28	24	0.6	0.6	5.5	2.2	7.7	2.5	2.2	0
2023	Western Bulldogs	30	5	2	2	13	8	21	5	4	0.4	0.4	2.6	1.6	4.2	1.0	0.8	0
Career			60	31	26	356	182	538	114	160	0.5	0.4	5.9	3.0	9.0	1.9	2.7	9
