= Diamond Creek Women's Football Club =

Australian rules football club

Diamond Creek
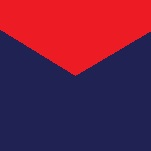

Names
- Full name: Diamond Creek Women's Football Club
- Nickname(s): Demons, Creekers

Club details
- Founded: 2002
- Colours: Navy blue Red

Other information
- Official website: dcwfc.com.au

The Diamond Creek Women's Football Club is a women's Australian rules football club based in Plenty, Victoria that currently competes in the Northern Football Netball League.

== History ==
A women's football team competed for Diamond Creek as early as 2002, when the Diamond Creek Football Club fielded a female side in the third division of the Victorian Women's Football League (VWFL). The team initially played out of Coventry Oval alongside the men's teams, but was forced to play at nearby Marngrook Oval in 2005 to make way for an additional junior boys team.

The Diamond Creek Women's Football Club was officially formed in December 2009 when it affiliated as its own sporting body, breaking away from the men's Diamond Creek club and finding a permanent winter home at Plenty War Memorial Park,

The club won its maiden Premier Division VWFL premiership in 2012 over Darebin by 5 points, with Kirsty Lamb taking best-afield honours. Following the dissolution of the VWFL, the Demons played two seasons in the VFL Women's competition as a founding member from 2016 to 2017, making the grand final in the latter year.

The club now competes in the Northern Football Netball League, operating eight teams from seniors down to under-10s.
