= St Kilda Sharks =

Australian rules football club

Names
- Full name: St Kilda Sharks Women's Football Club
- Former name: St Kilda City Sharks
- Nickname: Sharks

Club details
- Founded: 1992 (as St Kilda City Sharks)
- Colours: Red; White; Black
- Premierships: SEWF Div 1 (1): 2019; VWFL Premier (2): 1998; 1999; VWFL Div 2 (2): 1997; 2004; VWFL Premier Reserves (1): 2006

Other information
- Official website: stkildasharks.com

The St Kilda Sharks Women's Football Club is an Australian rules football club based in the Melbourne suburb of St Kilda that last competed in the South Eastern Women's Football (SEWF) competition.

Known as a pioneering club for women's football in Victoria, the Sharks played for 25 seasons in the Victorian Women's Football League before joining the VFL Women's (VFLW) as an inaugural member in 2016. After two seasons in the statewide VFLW, the Sharks transitioned back to being a "community club" ahead of their move to SEWF for the 2018 season.

The Sharks do not currently field a team in any competitions, having last competed in SEWF in 2021.

== History ==
The club was formed as the St Kilda City Sharks in 1992, joining the Victorian Women's Football League (VWFL) which, at the time, had only four members. During their time in the VWFL, the Sharks won four senior premierships. Their 1997 second division flag was immediately followed by first division triumphs in 1998 and 1999, capping a run of three successive premierships. A fourth premiership came while back in the second division in 2004.

== 30-year team ==
In May 2022, the St Kilda Sharks celebrated their 30th anniversary with a gala event. An all-star team was announced on the night, featuring the best players to have represented the club over its history.

B:	Mia-Rae Clifford	Liz Contini	Penny Cula-Reid
HB:	Sharon Bonnici	Doreen DePasquale	Alex Vanderwaal
C:	Shannon McFerran	Brianna Davey	Belinda Bowey
HF:	Phoebe McWilliams	Jasmine Garner	Cassandra Brooks (c)
F:	Tamara Norquay	Moana Hope	Nic Lalor
Foll:	Jenna Bruton	Jenny Male	Alex Whitehead
Int:	Sally Wenn	Jess Gardner	Georgia Harris
Int:	Brittany Bonnici		
Coach:	Ben Robinson		

- Assistant coaches: Keryn Ralph, Marnie Rosenberg, Jody Sullivan
- Team manager: Ann Rulton
