= Parkside Spurs =

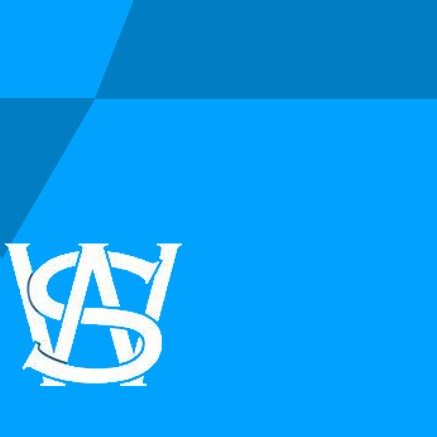

Names
- Full name: Parkside Spurs
- Nickname(s): Spurs
- Club song: "The Spurs of the Mighty West"

Club details
- Founded: 1993
- Competition: Western Region Football League
- President: Ashlea Block
- Ground(s): Henry Turner Reserve (Merv Hughes Oval)

Parkside Spurs is a women's Australian rules football club that competes in the Western Region Football League and AFL Masters Victoria competition. Based in Footscray, they play home games at Henry Turner Oval.

== History ==
The club were founded in 1993 by Debbie Lee as the Sunshine YCW Spurs. In 2000, the club moved to St Albans and rebranded as the St Albans Spurs. It was at St Albans that the Spurs won their first premiership, captained by Lee, who also claimed the Lisa Hardeman Medal for best on ground.

The club obtained a sponsorship from Victoria University in 2008 and the club marketed itself as the VU St Albans Spurs. Soon after, the club won its second premiership in 2011.

In 2015, the club was rebranded and relocated to Footscray, obtaining a sponsorship from the Maribyrnong City Council to be subsequently renamed the VU Western Spurs. The club had strong ties to the Western Bulldogs during this period; the club shared its VFL Women's license with the Bulldogs in 2018 and used their name and colours. Jordan Roughead, a former Western Bulldogs ruckman, was also an assistant coach of the club from 2015 until the end of the 2018 season.

== Colours ==
The Parkside Spurs have one guernsey, which is predominately sky blue with dark blue trimmings and features a 'PS' monogram in white. At home the Spurs wear dark blue shorts and dark blue socks. When playing away from home the Spurs don all-white shorts with a blue stripe running down each side and dark blue socks.

== AFLW representatives ==
The VU Western Spurs have had 8 players drafted to the AFLW competition whilst registered as a Spurs player. In the 2016 AFLW Draft, Alyssa Mifsud, Shelley Scott, Ainslie Kemp and Sarah Lampard were all drafted to Melbourne FC, Bree White was drafted by Collingwood FC and Ashleigh Guest was drafted to Greater Western Sydney Giants.

In the 2017 AFLW Rookie Draft, Naomi Ferres was chosen by the Western Bulldogs at pick number 3. Ferres went on to win the 2018 AFL Women's Grand Final and took a crucial mark in the defensive 50 on the siren to deny the Brisbane Lions a chance to tie the game.

The 2018 AFLW Draft saw Jessie Davies also be drafted by the Western Bulldogs at pick 46.

During the 2019 AFLW Draft, Elisabeth Georgostathis was drafted by the Western Bulldogs at pick 9.

In the preseason of the 2020 AFLW season , Vivien Saad was signed by the North Melbourne Football Club.

The Sydney Swans AFLW side was introduced ahead of the 2022/2023 season and with this came new opportunities for footballers across the country. A premiership Spur, Aimee Whelan was one of the inaugural signings for the club after a breakthrough season in the VFLW

== Club honours and achievements ==
2004 - VWFL Seniors Premiers vs. Melbourne University

2009 - Best Conducted Club for the Western Region

2011 - VWFL Seniors Premiers vs. Darebin Falcons

2012 - Victoria University Sports Awards: Sporting Club of the Year

2012 - VWFL Reserves Premiers

2017 - Northern Football League (Australia) Division 2 Premiers vs West Preston Lakeside

2019 - Northern Football League (Australia) Division 1 Premiers vs Diamond Creek

2019 - Northern Football League (Australia) Division 2 Premiers vs Heidelberg

== Coaching staff ==
Football Department

Position	Name
NFNL Seniors Head Coach	Tara Morgan
NFNL Seniors Assistant Coaches	Vaelei Lemauga & Dani Speranza
AFL Masters Head Coach	Beth Aitken
