= 2014 AFL women's draft =

Second women's draft organised by the Australian Football League

General information
- Date: 19 May 2014
- Location: Docklands Stadium, Victoria

Overview
- League: AFL Women's
- First selection: Tiah Haynes (Western Bulldogs)

The 2014 AFL women's draft was the second national women's draft organised by the Australian Football League, held to select Melbourne and Western Bulldogs players for the Hampson-Hardeman Cup, an exhibition match. It was conducted on 19 May and consisted of 24 picks, with 12 players selected by each team. Teams were permitted to retain 12 players from the 2013 match, and completed their lists through the draft. Coastal Titans player Tiah Haynes was selected by the Bulldogs with the first pick. The Titans provided the most players in the draft, with five selected.

== Draft ==
Pick	Player	Drafted to	Recruited from	League
1	Tiah Haynes	Western Bulldogs	Coastal Titans	WAWFL
2	Meg Hutchins	Melbourne	Eastern Devils	VWFL
3	Darcy Vescio	Western Bulldogs	Darebin Falcons	VWFL
4	Melissa Caulfield	Western Bulldogs	East Fremantle	WAWFL
5	Kellie Gibson	Melbourne	Swan Districts	WAWFL
6	Rheanne Lugg	Western Bulldogs	Swan Districts	WAWFL
7	Emma Zielke	Melbourne	Coorparoo	QWAFL
8	Dana Hooker	Western Bulldogs	Coastal Titans	WAWFL
9	Kaitlyn Ashmore	Melbourne	Melbourne University	VWFL
10	Moana Hope	Western Bulldogs	St Kilda	VWFL
11	Lauren Stammers	Melbourne	Coastal Titans	WAWFL
12	Brooke Whyte	Western Bulldogs	Melbourne University	VWFL
13	Phoebe McWilliams	Melbourne	St Kilda	VWFL
14	Emily Bates	Western Bulldogs	Yeronga South Brisbane	QWAFL
15	Renee Forth	Melbourne	Coastal Titans	WAWFL
16	Stephanie Walding	Western Bulldogs	East Fremantle	WAWFL
17	Tayla Harris	Melbourne	Zillmere	QWAFL
18	Stephanie Simpson	Western Bulldogs	Darebin Falcons	VWFL
19	Hayley Miller	Melbourne	Coastal Titans	WAWFL
20	Lauren Morecroft	Western Bulldogs	Diamond Creek	VWFL
21	Dianna Haynes	Melbourne	Diamond Creek	VWFL
22	Sissy Dunn	Melbourne	Pioneer E-Girls	CAWFL
23	Madeline Keryk	Western Bulldogs	Melbourne University	VWFL
24	Courtney Cramey	Melbourne	Morphettville Park	SAWFL

== Retained players ==
12 players were selected to be retained by each team, barring unavailability.

=== Melbourne ===
1. Kirby Bentley
2. Ellie Blackburn
3. Kiara Bowers
4. Kara Donnellan
5. Alicia Eva
6. Courtney Gum
7. Melissa Hickey
8. Leah Kaslar
9. Daisy Pearce
10. Chelsea Randall
11. Emma Swanson
12. Bree White
13. Lou Wotton

=== Western Bulldogs ===
1. Lauren Arnell
2. Katie Brennan
3. Steph Chiocci
4. Emma Kearney
5. Elise O'Dea
6. Aasta O'Connor
7. Karen Paxman
8. Kira Phillips
9. Rebecca Privitelli
10. Lauren Spark
11. Nicola Stevens
12. Louise Stephenson
13. Natalie Wood
