= 2013 AFL women's draft =

First women's draft organised by the Australian Football League

General information
- Date: 15 May 2013
- Location: Jack Ryder Room, Melbourne Cricket Ground, Victoria

Overview
- League: AFL Women's
- First selection: Daisy Pearce (Melbourne)

The 2013 AFL women's draft was the inaugural national women's draft organised by the Australian Football League, held to select Melbourne and Western Bulldogs players for the Hampson-Hardeman Cup, an exhibition match. It was conducted on 15 May and consisted of 50 picks, with the odd-numbered picks selected by Melbourne, and the even-numbered picks selected by the Bulldogs. The order was decided by a coin toss on the night. Darebin Falcons player Daisy Pearce was selected by Melbourne with the first pick. Darebin provided the most players in the draft, with 10 selected.

== Draft ==
Pick	Player	Drafted to	Recruited from	League
1	Daisy Pearce	Melbourne	Darebin Falcons	VWFL
2	Steph Chiocci	Western Bulldogs	Diamond Creek	VWFL
3	Chelsea Randall	Melbourne	Swan Districts	WAWFL
4	Aasta O'Connor	Western Bulldogs	Darebin Falcons	VWFL
5	Kara Donnellan	Melbourne	Swan Districts	WAWFL
6	Karen Paxman	Western Bulldogs	Darebin Falcons	VWFL
7	Kirby Bentley	Melbourne	East Fremantle	WAWFL
8	Katie Loynes	Western Bulldogs	Diamond Creek	VWFL
9	Lou Wotton	Melbourne	Eastern Devils	VWFL
10	Emma Kearney	Western Bulldogs	Melbourne University	VWFL
11	Melissa Hickey	Melbourne	Darebin Falcons	VWFL
12	Lauren Arnell	Western Bulldogs	Darebin Falcons	VWFL
13	Ellie Blackburn	Melbourne	Beaconsfield	South East Juniors Youth Girls Division 1
14	Rebecca Privitelli	Western Bulldogs	Darebin Falcons	VWFL
15	Melissa Caulfield	Melbourne	East Fremantle	WAWFL
16	Elise O'Dea	Western Bulldogs	Darebin Falcons	VWFL
17	Jasmine Garner	Melbourne	St Kilda	VWFL
18	Nicola Stevens	Western Bulldogs	Melbourne University	VWFL
19	Kiara Bowers	Melbourne	Coastal Titans	WAWFL
20	Natalie Thomas	Western Bulldogs	Yeronga South Brisbane	QWAFL
21	Madeline Keryk	Melbourne	St Albans Spurs	VWFL
22	Katie Brennan	Western Bulldogs	Darebin Falcons	VWFL
23	Bree White	Melbourne	St Albans Spurs	VWFL
24	Leah Mascall	Western Bulldogs	Coastal Titans	WAWFL
25	Courtney Gum	Melbourne	UNSW-Eastern Suburbs	AFL Sydney Women's
26	Louise Stephenson	Western Bulldogs	Melbourne University	VWFL
27	Alicia Eva	Melbourne	Melbourne University	VWFL
28	Kate Lutkins	Western Bulldogs	Yeronga South Brisbane	QWAFL
29	Emma Swanson	Melbourne	Peel Thunderbirds	WAWFL
30	Lauren Spark	Western Bulldogs	Melbourne University	VWFL
31	Brooke Whyte	Melbourne	Coastal Titans	WAWFL
32	Kira Phillips	Western Bulldogs	Peel Thunderbirds	WAWFL
33	Bianca Jakobsson	Melbourne	Berwick	VWFL
34	Sarah D'Arcy	Western Bulldogs	Eastern Devils	VWFL
35	Jennifer Lew	Melbourne	Sydney University	AFL Sydney Women's
36	Ally Anderson	Western Bulldogs	Zillmere	QWAFL
37	Leah Kaslar	Melbourne	Palm Beach Currumbin	SEQAFL Women's League Division 2
38	Courtney Cramey	Western Bulldogs	Morphettville Park	SAWFL
39	Kaitlyn Ashmore	Melbourne	Melbourne University	VWFL
40	Jenna Bruton	Western Bulldogs	Golden Point	Ballarat Youth Girls League
41	Renee Forth	Melbourne	Coastal Titans	WAWFL
42	Penny Cula-Reid	Western Bulldogs	St Kilda	VWFL
43	Stephanie Walding	Melbourne	East Fremantle	WAWFL
44	Emily Bates	Western Bulldogs	Yeronga South Brisbane	QWAFL
45	Amy Catterall	Melbourne	St Kilda	VWFL
46	Jessica Dal Pos	Western Bulldogs	Darebin Falcons	VWFL
47	Alex Price	Melbourne	Port Adelaide	SAWFL
48	Kellie Gibson	Western Bulldogs	Swan Districts	WAWFL
49	Bronwyn Davey	Melbourne	Greenacres	SAWFL
50	Natalie Wood	Western Bulldogs	Darebin Falcons	VWFL
