= 2015 AFL women's draft =

Third women's draft organised by the Australian Football League

General information
- Dates: 20 April 2015 (main draft); 22 July 2015 (mini-draft)
- Time: 7:00pm (main draft); 12:00pm (mini-draft)
- Location: Docklands Stadium, Victoria (main draft); AFL House, Victoria (mini-draft)

Overview
- League: AFL Women's
- First selection: Emma King (Western Bulldogs)

The 2015 AFL women's draft was an opportunity for Melbourne and the Western Bulldogs to select players for the Hampson-Hardeman Cup. It consisted of a draft before the first match, held on 20 April and including 34 picks, and a mini-draft before the second match, held on 22 July and including 10 picks. Before the first match, teams were permitted to retain six players from their 2013 squads, and completed their lists through the draft. Coastal Titans ruck Emma King was selected by the Bulldogs with the first pick.

== Draft ==
Pick	Player	Drafted to	Recruited from	League
1	Emma King	Western Bulldogs	Coastal Titans	WAWFL
2	Danielle Goding	Melbourne	Morphettville Park	SAWFL
3	Meg Hutchins	Western Bulldogs	Eastern Devils	VWFL
4	Kiara Bowers	Melbourne	Coastal Titans	WAWFL
5	Kellie Gibson	Western Bulldogs	Swan Districts	WAWFL
6	Ellie Blackburn	Melbourne	Melbourne University	VWFL
7	Emma Zielke	Western Bulldogs	Coorparoo	QWAFL
8	Elise O'Dea	Melbourne	Darebin Falcons	VWFL
9	Katie Loynes	Western Bulldogs	Diamond Creek	VWFL
10	Emma Swanson	Melbourne	Peel Thunderbirds	WAWFL
11	Renee Forth	Western Bulldogs	Coastal Titans	WAWFL
12	Hayley Miller	Melbourne	Coastal Titans	WAWFL
13	Kaitlyn Ashmore	Western Bulldogs	Melbourne University	VWFL
14	Ebony Antonio	Melbourne	Coastal Titans	WAWFL
15	Lauren Arnell	Western Bulldogs	Darebin Falcons	VWFL
16	Dana Hooker	Melbourne	Coastal Titans	WAWFL
17	Jess Wuetschner	Western Bulldogs	East Fremantle	WAWFL
18	Leah Mascall	Melbourne	Coastal Titans	WAWFL
19	Heather Anderson	Western Bulldogs	Belconnen	AFL Canberra Women's
20	Kira Phillips	Melbourne	Peel Thunderbirds	WAWFL
21	Emily Bates	Western Bulldogs	Yeronga South Brisbane	QWAFL
22	Brooke Whyte	Melbourne	Melbourne University	VWFL
23	Leah Kaslar	Western Bulldogs	Coolangatta Tweed Heads	QWAFL
24	Lauren Morecroft	Melbourne	Diamond Creek	VWFL
25	Hannah Scott	Western Bulldogs	Eastern Devils	VWFL
26	Cecilia McIntosh	Melbourne	Melbourne University	VWFL
27	Madeline Keryk	Western Bulldogs	Melbourne University	VWFL
28	Bree White	Melbourne	St Albans Spurs	VWFL
29	Phoebe McWilliams	Western Bulldogs	St Kilda	VWFL
30	Brianna Green	Melbourne	East Fremantle	WAWFL
31	Jordan Zanchetta	Western Bulldogs	Yeronga South Brisbane	QWAFL
32	Courtney Cramey	Melbourne	Morphettville Park	SAWFL
33	Pepa Randall	Western Bulldogs	St Kilda	VWFL
34	Jodie Hicks	Melbourne	Riverina	AFL Canberra Women's

== Mini-draft ==
Pick	Player	Drafted to	Recruited from	League
1	Brianna Davey	Western Bulldogs	St Kilda	VWFL
2	Brittany Bonnici	Melbourne	St Kilda	VWFL
3	Tahlia Randall	Western Bulldogs	Nambour/Maroochydore	AFL Sunshine Coast Juniors Under-18 Girls
4	Sabrina Frederick-Traub	Melbourne	South Fremantle	WAWFL
5	Caitlyn Edwards	Western Bulldogs	East Fremantle	WAWFL
6	Tiarna Ernst	Melbourne	Diamond Creek	VWFL
7	Emma Humphries	Western Bulldogs	Burnie	TWL
8	Jenna Bruton	Melbourne	St Kilda	VWFL
9	Maddy Collier	Western Bulldogs	UNSW-Eastern Suburbs	AFL Sydney Women's
10	Jess Dal Pos	Melbourne	Darebin Falcons	VWFL

== Retained players ==
Before the first match, six players were selected to be retained by each team, barring unavailability.

=== Melbourne ===
1. Kirby Bentley
2. Kara Donnellan
3. Tayla Harris
4. Melissa Hickey
5. Daisy Pearce
6. Chelsea Randall

=== Western Bulldogs ===
1. Katie Brennan
2. Steph Chiocci
3. Moana Hope
4. Emma Kearney
5. Aasta O'Connor
6. Darcy Vescio
