= Darebin Falcons =

Names
- Full name: Darebin Women's Sports Club
- Former name: Fairfield Falcons Football Club
- Nickname: Falcons
- Motto: "Join the flight"

2024 season
- After finals: VFLW: N/A; NFNL Div 1: N/A; NFNL Div 3: N/A
- Home-and-away season: VFLW: 10th NFNL Div 1: 6th NFNL Div 3: 7th

Club details
- Founded: 1990; 36 years ago
- Competition: VFLW: Seniors; NFNL: Division 1 NFNL: Division 2
- President: Jane Ryan
- Coach: Lache Walker
- Premierships: VFLW (2): 2016; 2017; VWFL (9): 1996; 2006; 2007; 2008; 2009; 2010; 2013; 2014; 2015
- Ground: Bill Lawry Oval; La Trobe Uni; Preston City Oval
- Former ground: Fairfield Park (1990); McDonell Park (1991–2005)

Other information
- Official website: https://falcons.org.au/

The Darebin Women's Sports Club, nicknamed the Falcons, is a sports club based in the northern suburbs of Melbourne that is primarily notable for its Australian rules football team which competes in the highest-level Victorian state league – the VFL Women's (VFLW). It is the only VFLW club that is not affiliated with a men's team in the Victorian Football League (VFL), nor a side from the national AFL Women's (AFLW) or Australian Football League (AFL) competitions.

Founded in 1990, the club originally competed in the Victorian Women's Football League (VWFL). Darebin dominated the 2000s, appearing in every grand final from 2005 to 2015 and winning eight premierships. The inception of the AFLW in 2017 brought changes and difficulties; the club won two premierships in the newly established VFL Women's but had to rely on a council grant to raise the necessary funds to play in the increasingly professional competition and struggled against better-resourced opponents.

Guardian Australia notes Darebin's "long... reputation for developing star talent and setting the bar for the women's game", having produced AFLW players such as Katie Brennan, Daisy Pearce and Darcy Vescio. The club also fields football teams in the Northern Football Netball League, youth and masters sides, as well as soccer, cricket and eight-ball teams. Now with twenty-nine soccer teams, the club currently has the largest number of girls and women playing soccer in Victoria. As of October 2018, an estimated 550 players represent the club across the sports.

== History ==
=== 1990–2004: Origins and early years ===
The club originated in 1990 after the Fairfield Falcons, a VWFL team, lost almost all their players to retirement or rival clubs and was about to dissolve after three seasons in the competition. A group of women from Northcote, inexperienced but wanting to play football, revived the club under the same name, training for a year at Fairfield Park with around 30 players. In 1991, the Falcons rejoined the VWFL and began playing at McDonell Park, which Northcote Council (now City of Darebin) had made a women's sporting field. After steady on- and off-field improvements, the Falcons finished atop the ladder in 1996 after a streak of wins in the second part of the season. After defeating the St Kilda Sharks in the semi-final, the club faced the Spurs in the grand final and recovered from a 36-point half-time deficit to win their first premiership by 13 points.

In 1997, the club expanded to field a soccer team in the second division of the Victorian Women's Soccer Association (now Football Victoria), claiming to be the first Australian women's sports club to field Australian rules football and soccer teams. Despite the side's mix of novices and experienced players, the team won a final in its first season. By 2000, the Falcons added a second team, competing in the fourth division, and the second-division team had won a premiership. The club changed its name from the Fairfield Falcons to Darebin Women's Sports Club, reflecting the new variety of sports available and its change in location since its origins. In the following years, the club introduced cricket (2001), football reserves (2002) and eight-ball pool (2004) sides, and affiliated itself with a Gaelic football team. The cricket side, competing in the Victorian Women's Cricket Association western competition, won the B-division competition in the 2003/04 season and advanced to A-division.

=== 2005–2015: VWFL dominance ===
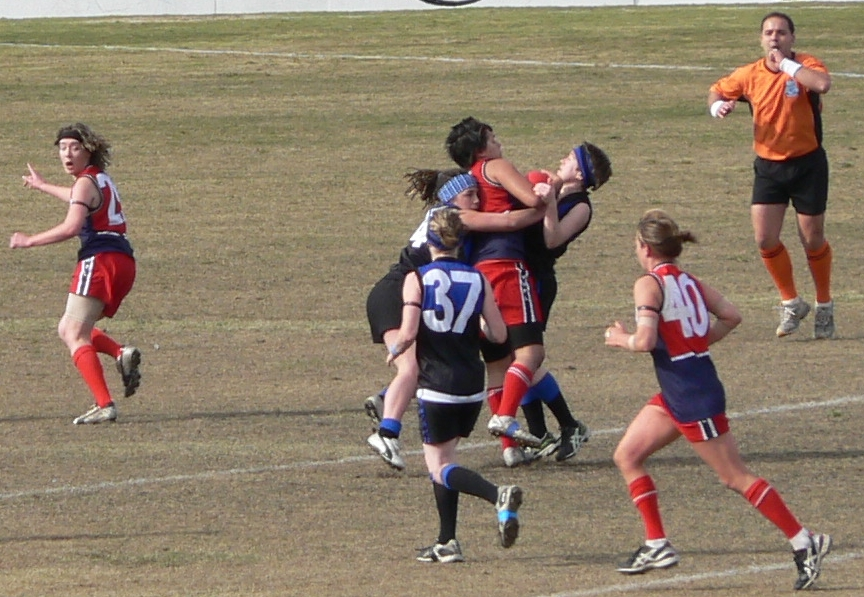
A Darebin player tackled by Melbourne University opponents in the 2006 VWFL grand final

In July 2005, the club moved to AH Capp Reserve; a purpose-built venue including football, soccer and cricket grounds, training facilities and a two-storey building for change rooms and social events, where the club were sole tenants. The site, located alongside the Merri Creek, was developed as part of an upgrade of sporting facilities for the 2006 Commonwealth Games, which were hosted in Melbourne. Darebin returned to the grand final in 2005 but lost to their opponents Melbourne University.

Darebin again progressed to the finals in 2006, but suffered a 35-point loss to University in the semi-final. However, the Falcons still managed to progress to the grand final, setting up a rematch of the previous year's decider at Whitten Oval. Darebin started as underdogs due to a string of losses to University during the season, but won 13.7 (85) to 5.7 (37) after a tight first-half contest gave way to a streak of nine straight goals from Darebin, ensuring their first premiership in a decade. Despite the 48-point difference on the scoreboard, the match was still reported as a close and exciting game, characterised by skilled and contested play, pack marks and attacking forays effected by the teams' centre half-forwards. Kathy Zacharopoulos, a Darebin midfielder, won the Lisa Hardeman Medal as best on ground, while Alisha Habib, Julia Boyle and Moana Hope kicked multiple goals apiece for the Falcons. The match was attended by roughly 1000 people.

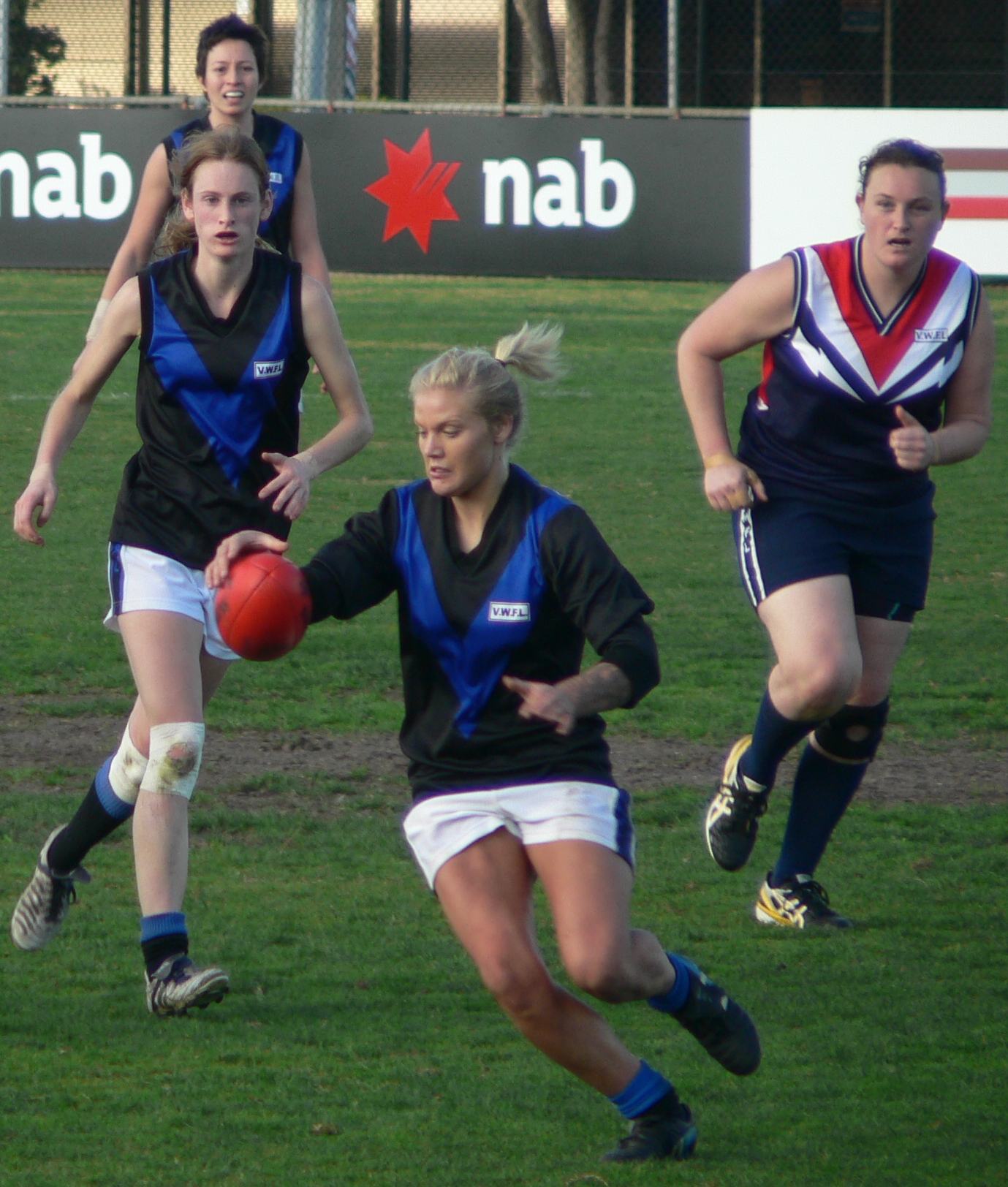
A University player in possession during the 2007 VWFL grand final against Darebin

Darebin dominated the 2007 season, finishing unbeaten atop the ladder and conceding a mere 387 points in their 14 wins. The club defeated University by 10 points in the semi-final, but for the third consecutive year, the rivals faced off in the grand final. At Preston City Oval (then known as NAB Oval), in front of a 1000-strong crowd, University enjoyed a fast start, kicking 7.0 (42) to take a 13-point lead into half-time. However, in the third quarter the Falcons answered with four consecutive goals while keeping their opponents scoreless, and went on to win 10.10 (70) to 8.0 (48). Hope kicked three goals for the Falcons while Roi Boutsikakis, a Darebin back, was named best on ground.

In 2008, the Falcons continued their unbeaten streak and returned to the grand final at Trevor Barker Oval, again playing University. With 2000 in attendance, Darebin won by a comfortable margin of 68 points, 15.10 (100) to 4.8 (32). (Note: Reports of University's score varied from 4.8 (32) (from The Age) to 5.2 (32) (Herald Sun), but the official Sporting Pulse score agreed with The Age) Hope was the Lisa Hardeman Medallist after kicking six goals for the Falcons. Darebin faced a new opponent in the 2009 grand final – Diamond Creek – at Box Hill City Oval. Advantaged by the direction of the wind, the Falcons took a 16-point lead into half-time, which would have been greater if not for inaccurate kicking. Darebin went on to win their fourth consecutive premiership by 44 points, breaking the VWFL record previously held by the Parkville Scorpions, which won premierships in 1987, 1988 and 1989. Sarah Hammond, who had competed at the 2000 Sydney Olympics in handball, won the Lisa Hardeman Medal as a Darebin midfielder. The Falcons implemented a zone defence system in 2010, in an attempt to counteract younger teams' pace. It proved effective – the club continued its winning streak, defeating Diamond Creek again in the grand final at Northcote Park, 9.9 (63) to 4.7 (31). Aasta O'Connor was the Lisa Hardeman Medallist.

Late in 2010, having coached the club to five consecutive premierships, Peta Searle moved on to coaching the Western Jets. Michael Bell was appointed as the senior coach for the 2011 season and after winning the first three games was sacked. Anna McIllroy, previously the team's co-captain, began coaching the side. When the 2011 season began, Darebin's unbeaten run was finally broken by the St Albans Spurs in round 4, which defeated the Falcons by 48 points. The streak had stretched from the 2006 semi-final, totalling sixty-five games without a loss. Darebin recovered to win seven of their first eight matches, averaging a 106-point winning margin. A number of Falcons played for Victoria at the AFL Women's National Championships in South Australia – O'Connor, Shevaun Hogan, Daisy Pearce, Anna Schwager, Samantha Smith and Natalie Wood. However, the Spurs overcame Darebin again in round 15, by 22 points. In the semi-final, Darebin recovered to defeat their new rivals by three goals, but faced them again in the grand final at Coburg City Oval. St Albans kicked eight of the first ten goals to enter half-time with a comfortable 33-point lead and continued to dominate in the second half, finishing 79-point winners (16.6 (102) to 3.5 (23)). Karen Paxman, the Lisa Hardeman Medallist, muted Darebin captain Pearce's impact.

McIllroy stepped down as coach in 2012 due to her work commitments and was replaced by Richard Dal Pos, who previously coached the youth team. Darebin progressed to the finals, defeating St Albans in a semi-final by six points in extra time. The Falcons faced Diamond Creek in the grand final, again held at Coburg City Oval, where they started as favourites having only lost one match for the season. The sides were difficult to separate in the first half; Diamond Creek held Darebin to a single goal in 36 minutes but inaccurate kicking and another goal conceded to O'Connor close to half-time meant the club's lead was only 17 points going into the break. The Falcons kicked the next three goals and took the lead, but Diamond Creek regained momentum and held on for a five-point victory – 5.9 (39) to 5.4 (34). It was the club's first victory over Darebin in their decade-long history.

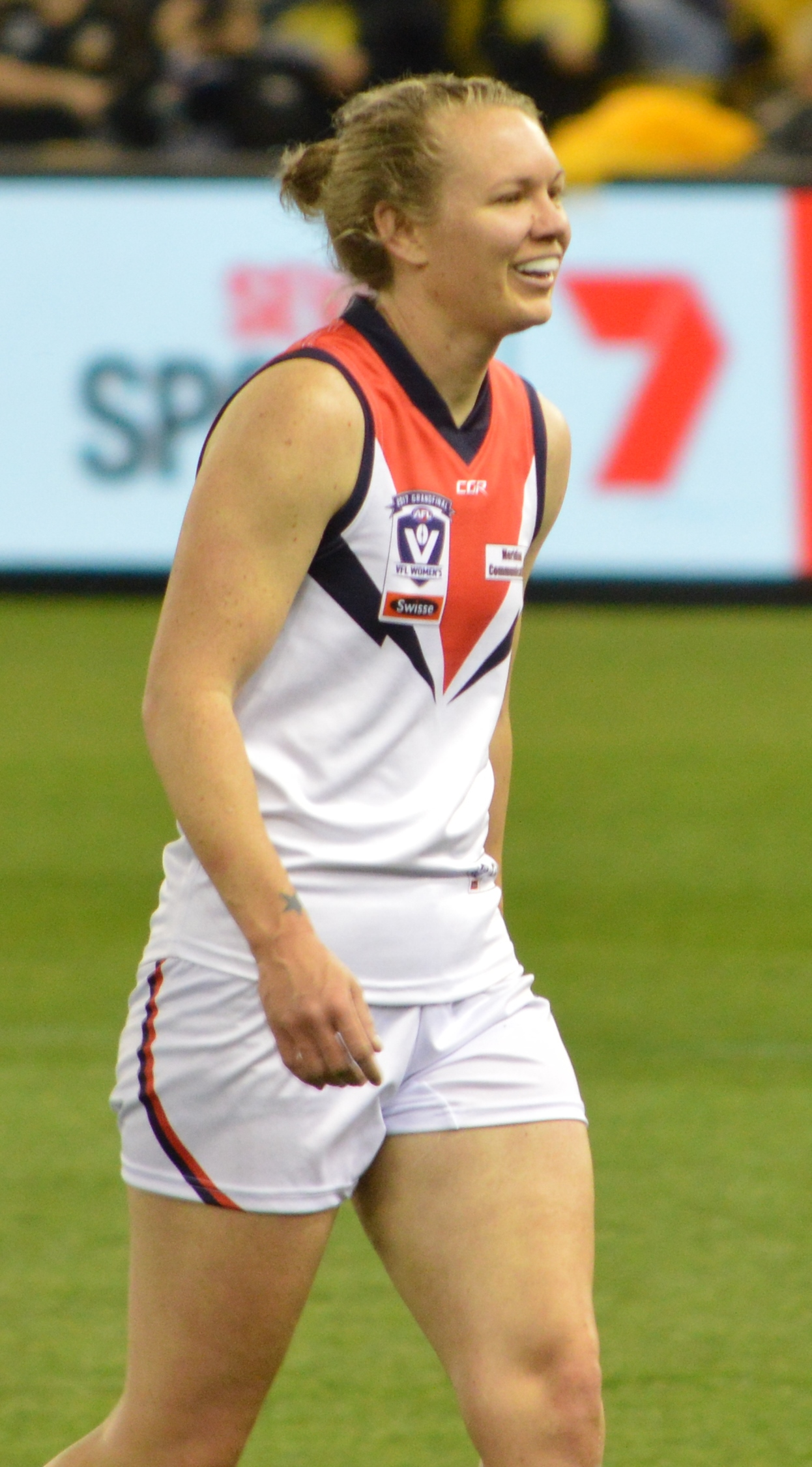
Aasta O'Connor was the fourth pick in the inaugural AFL women's draft.

In May 2013, the inaugural AFL women's draft was held. 50 players were selected to make up Melbourne and Western Bulldogs sides, which played an exhibition game for the Hampson–Hardeman Cup. Ten Darebin players were recruited, the most of any club:

- Daisy Pearce (no. 1, Melbourne)
- Aasta O'Connor (no. 4, Western Bulldogs)
- Karen Paxman (no. 6, Western Bulldogs)
- Melissa Hickey (no. 11, Melbourne)
- Lauren Arnell (no. 12, Western Bulldogs)
- Rebecca Privitelli (no. 14, Western Bulldogs)
- Elise O'Dea (no. 16, Western Bulldogs)
- Katie Brennan (no. 22, Western Bulldogs)
- Jessica Dal Pos (no. 46, Western Bulldogs)
- Natalie Wood (no. 50, Western Bulldogs)

An eleventh Darebin player, Nicole Callinan, was named as an emergency.

The Falcons were undefeated in the 2013 home-and-away season and again faced Diamond Creek in the grand final. Darebin were considered favourites, having defeated their opponents by 144 points during the regular season and 68 points in the semi-final. After a close first half, O'Connor kicked two goals in two minutes for Darebin at the start of the third quarter; after eight minutes the Falcons' lead was 17 points. Darebin increased their advantage to 28 points at three-quarter-time and continued to score heavily in the final quarter, finishing 49-point victors. The Lisa Hardeman Medallist was Darebin's Melissa Hickey.

A second AFL women's draft for the Hampson–Hardeman Cup exhibition match was held in May 2014. 24 players were drafted; twelve by Melbourne, twelve by the Western Bulldogs. The rest of the squads were made up of players from the 2013 teams. Two Darebin players were drafted, both to the Western Bulldogs: Darcy Vescio (no. 3) and Stephanie Simpson (no. 18). Jessica Dal Pos was the only Darebin player from the 2013 teams that was not retained for 2014. For the 2014 home-and-away season, the Falcons again went undefeated, facing Diamond Creek for the third consecutive year in the grand final at Coburg, which 1812 people attended. The margin at half-time was only eight points, but Darebin kicked away in the third quarter, keeping their opponents scoreless while scoring three goals themselves. The club finished 30-point winners, 10.15 (75) to 6.9 (45). Pearce was named best on ground while Katie Brennan scored four goals.

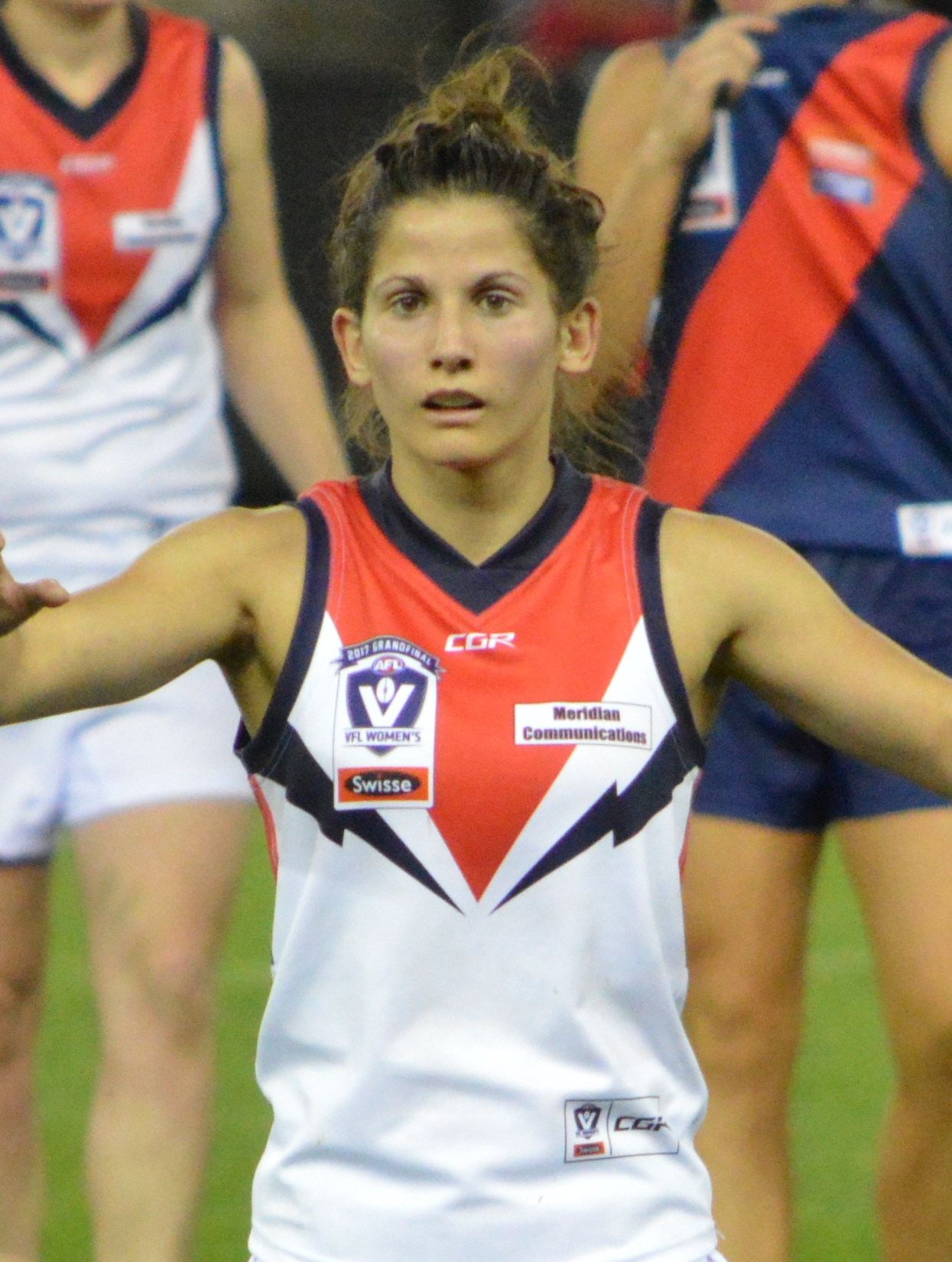
Jessica Dal Pos was the 10th pick in the 2015 AFL women's mini-draft.

The Falcons had two players out of 34 selected in the 2015 AFL women's draft in April for the Hampson–Hardeman Cup: Elise O'Dea (no. 8, Melbourne) and Lauren Arnell (no. 15, Western Bulldogs). The clubs also chose to retain Brennan, Hickey, O'Connor, Pearce and Vescio from the previous year's squads. Additionally, Dal Pos was selected by Melbourne with the 10th and final pick in a subsequent mini-draft in July. In June, Darebin received council funding for lighting upgrades at their home grounds – AH Capp and WH Robinson reserves. The club and the council had collaborated to apply for an $80,000 grant, on the understanding the Falcons would contribute $10,000 and the council $330,000; however, the arrangement had been overlooked by the council in a draft budget.

In the 2015 season, Darebin's two-season unbeaten run was stopped by University in round 2, but the Falcons went on to win the rest of their games for the home-and-away segment and won through to the grand final, against Diamond Creek once again. Several Darebin players were affected by injury – O'Connor was unavailable after hurting her knee, while Brennan played with a stress fracture in her foot. Shannon Egan stepped in to O'Connor's ruck role and Vescio played at centre half-forward to cover Brennan's change to a stay-at-home forward. Darebin kept Diamond Creek goalless in the first half, leading by 30 points going into half-time. The Falcons went on to kick seven more goals, winning 11.15 (81) to 2.6 (18) – a 63-point margin. Vescio was the Lisa Hardeman Medallist after kicking two goals, while Brennan managed to score three despite her injury. Post-season, Richard Dal Pos stepped down as coach.

=== 2016–2019: Entry into VFLW and financial troubles ===
Ahead of the planned introduction of a national women's league in 2017 – the AFL Women's (AFLW) – AFL Victoria instituted the VFL Women's in 2016, a women's state league aligned with the existing men's Victorian Football League, to replace the VWFL. The competition included all six VWFL teams in the premier division (Darebin, Diamond Creek, Eastern Devils, Melbourne University, St Kilda Sharks and the Western Spurs) and the best four sides from a lower division (Cranbourne, Geelong Magpies, Knox and Seaford). In July, marquee players for the AFLW were named, including four Darebin players: Brennan (who would play for the Western Bulldogs), Hickey and Pearce (both Melbourne), and Vescio (Carlton).

The beginning of the AFLW proved troublesome for many VFLW teams; its commencement made elite-level women's football more professional – increasing the expected standards of clubs' staff, programs and venues. These new standards, in turn, increased the funding required to operate a VFLW club. For example, after the Australian Football League (AFL) introduced smaller footballs for women's leagues, Darebin had to crowdfund $8800 for 100 new balls. As a volunteer-operated club, it was also difficult for Darebin to compete with teams such as Geelong and Box Hill that were endowed with improved facilities and financial support by their wealthy AFL counterparts. As a result of these pressures, three fellow foundation VFLW clubs left the competition after the 2017 season. The alternatives to departure were affiliating with an AFL club, which Darebin members wanted to avoid in the hope of maintaining their name and independence, or finding external funding. In 2018, a $300,000 grant from Darebin City Council allowed the club to continue in the VFLW and reach the new requirements over the next years.

On the field, the Falcons' new coach was Jane Lange, who also represented the side as a player in 2016. Darebin won the inaugural VFLW premiership, defeating University in front of roughly 4000 people at Coburg. For the second consecutive year, Vescio was best on ground, kicking a goal at the end of the third quarter to extend a Darebin lead to five goals. The comfortable margin ensured a fourth-quarter comeback from University was not enough for victory.

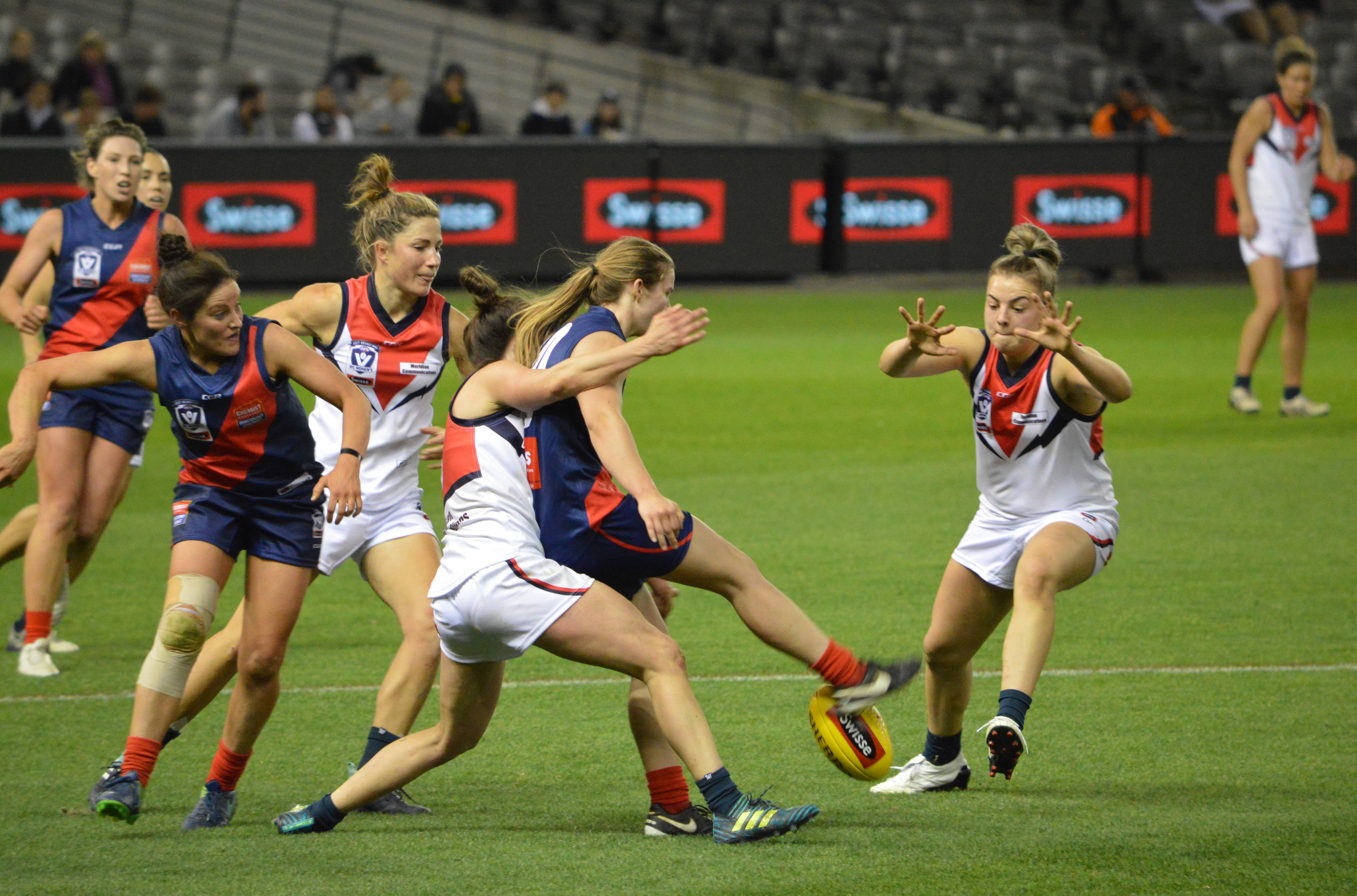
During the 2017 VFLW grand final, Darebin's Ebony Marinoff attempts to smother a Diamond Creek player's kick.

Darebin won through to the grand final again in 2017, losing to Diamond Creek by 25 points in the semi-final but recovering to defeat St Kilda by five points in the preliminary final, 4.4 (28) to 3.5 (23). The Falcons faced Diamond Creek at Docklands Stadium (then known as Etihad Stadium) in the decider. Darebin kept their opponents goalless in the first half, and amassed a 20-point lead close to three-quarter-time. The margin dropped to eight points in the final quarter, but the Falcons held on for a close victory, 5.5 (35) to 4.4 (28). Darebin midfielder Karen Paxman won the Lisa Hardeman Medal.

Post-season, Lange expected some AFLW-listed players to leave Darebin for their clubs' VFLW affiliates. For 2018, the Falcons retained the majority of their squad, but Carlton-listed players Vescio and Lauren Arnell played for their club's VFL affiliates and other AFLW-listed players were expected to play fewer games. Pearce, Darebin's captain, rested for a season. Among the new players for 2018 was Hannah Mouncey, a transgender woman who the AFL had barred from participating in the AFLW for 2017. The Falcons finished fifth in 2018, missing the grand final for the first time since 2004. By 2019, Darebin's only AFLW-listed players were Arnell, Elise O'Dea, Lauren Pearce, and Jamie Stanton, and the side finished 11th. Michael Ericson was the team's coach for 2019, but only led the club for one season; Mitch Skelly was appointed for 2020.

=== 2020–present: Power imbalance and on-field struggles ===
Darebin players at half-time of a VFLW match in 2026

The 2020 VFLW season was scheduled to begin in May, but was initially postponed due to the ongoing COVID-19 pandemic before eventually being cancelled the following month. A planned four-team 'super series', in which Darebin players had the chance to compete to audition for a place on an AFLW list, was then announced and also subsequently cancelled in August. Competitive VFLW football finally returned in February 2021, with Darebin's opening round match ending in a low-scoring 2-point loss to Williamstown. Skelly was buoyant about his side's chances pre-season, explaining that the new league format – which restricted AFLW players from taking part until the second half of the year – would give the Falcons "a chance to be really competitive". Despite this optimism, Darebin would ultimately record just one win (over North Melbourne in round 6) and one draw (in their return match against Williamstown) from its 14 matches in the 2021 VFLW season. The club soon appointed former Falcon player and four-time premiership winner Kate Tyndall to the role of senior coach for 2022 and beyond.

Darebin's 2022 season would get off to an improved start under Tyndall, when the Falcons recovered from a scoreless first quarter and 32-point deficit against Williamstown to prevail by 3 points in what was described as "a famous win to rival any of [Darebin's] great performances of the pre-AFLW era". The remainder of the season could best be described as a year of two halves; after losing their next two matches, the Falcons hit form to record four consecutive victories and sit in fourth place on the ladder after seven rounds. Yet in the weeks to come, Darebin struggled against its more favoured opponents and ultimately failed to win another game for the rest of the season, finishing the year in eighth place.

Season seven of the AFLW began less than two months after the conclusion of the 2022 VFLW season, and for the first time featured all 18 AFL clubs. This would impact Darebin more than any other VFLW club as they could no longer access any AFLW-listed players, and by virtue of being the only independent team in the league, had the smallest talent pool to select from for the upcoming 2023 VFLW season. This was reflected on-field as the Falcons suffered through possibly their least successful season in history; the team finished with its first VFLW wooden spoon, losing every match for the season by an average of 47 points. Darebin won just five of 56 individual quarters across the year, and managed to kick more than three goals in a game on only one occasion.

After season's end, the Falcons announced a new senior coach for the 2024 VFLW season, with Lache Walker to take the reins after previously being assistant coach at North Melbourne.

== Honours ==
=== Leadership ===
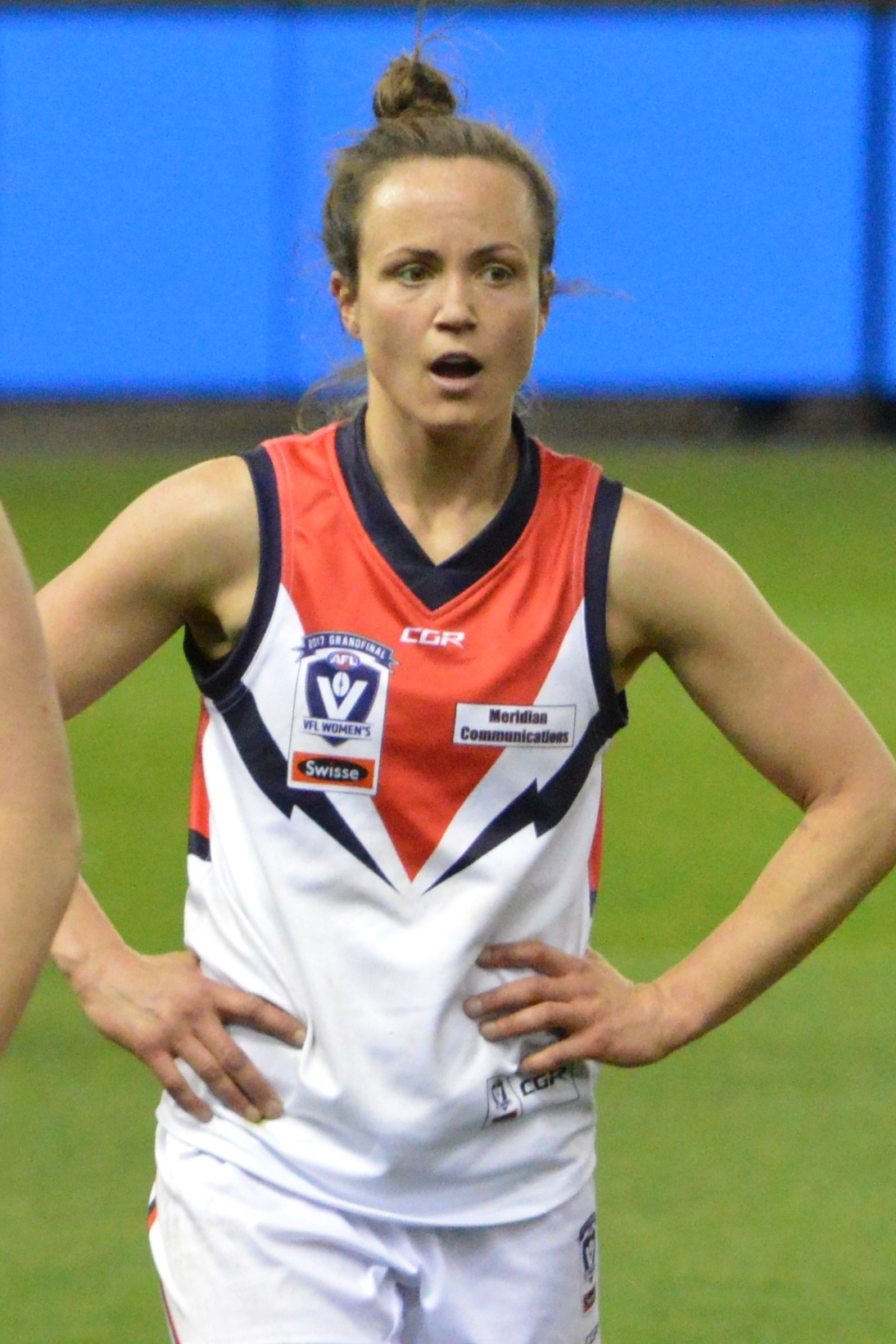
Daisy Pearce captained Darebin from 2008 to 2016, winning seven league best and fairests in that time.

*	Indicates captain-coach
#	Indicates playing-coach
†	Indicates premiership year
‡	Indicates grand final appearance

Year	Coach	Captain(s)	Ref.
1990	Lori Roache	[data missing]	
1991	Colleen Vale	[data missing]	
1992	Colleen Vale	[data missing]	
1993	Colleen Vale	[data missing]	
1994	Deb 'Henry' Lawson	[data missing]	
1995	Deb 'Henry' Lawson	[data missing]	
1996†	Deb 'Henry' Lawson	[data missing]	
1997	Rosalie Scott	[data missing]	
1998	[data missing]	[data missing]	
1999	[data missing]	[data missing]	
2000	[data missing]	[data missing]	
2001	Sal Rees*		
2002	Sal Rees*		
2003	Kerry Saunders	[data missing]	
2004	Kerry Saunders	[data missing]	
2005‡	Peta Searle	[data missing]	
2006†	Peta Searle	Kerryn Stephens	
2007†	Peta Searle	Kerryn Stephens	
2008†	Peta Searle	Anna McIlroy, Daisy Pearce	
2009†	Peta Searle	Anna McIlroy, Daisy Pearce	
2010†	Peta Searle	Anna McIlroy, Daisy Pearce	
2011‡	Anna McIlroy	Daisy Pearce	
2012‡	Richard Dal Pos	Daisy Pearce	
2013†	Richard Dal Pos	Daisy Pearce	
2014†	Richard Dal Pos	Daisy Pearce	
2015†	Richard Dal Pos	Daisy Pearce	
2016†	Jane Lange#	Daisy Pearce	
2017†	Jane Lange	Elise O'Dea	
2018	Jane Lange	Kate Tyndall	
2019	Michael Ericson	Stephanie Simpson	
2020 (Note: The 2020 VFL Women's season was cancelled due to the COVID-19 pandemic in Victoria.)	Mitch Skelly	Stephanie Simpson	
2021	Mitch Skelly	Stephanie Simpson	
2022	Kate Tyndall	Stephanie Simpson	
2023	Kate Tyndall	Stephanie Simpson	
2024	Lache Walker	Stephanie Simpson & Caitlin Bunker	

=== 1991–2015: VWFL ===
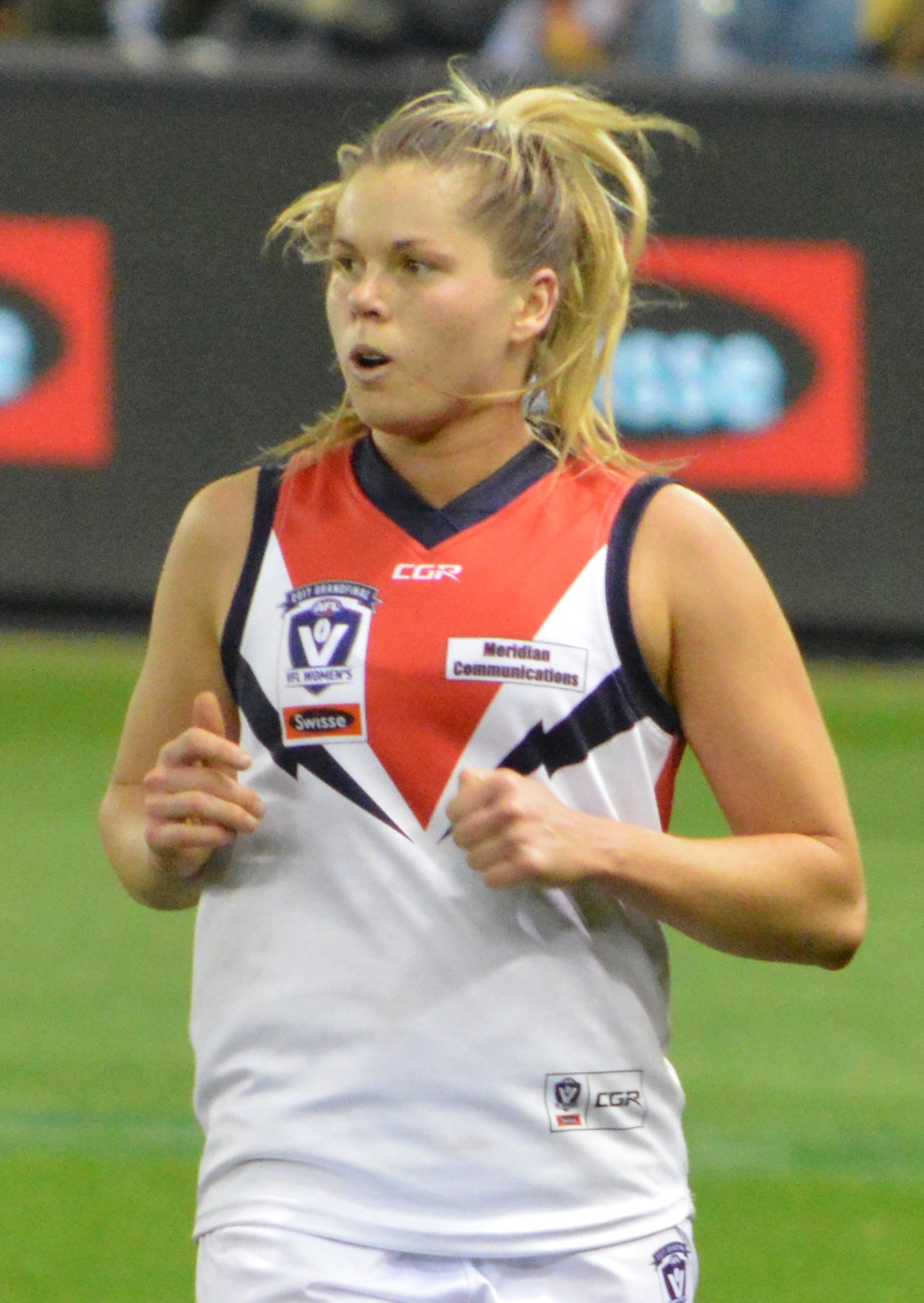
Katie Brennan was named the VWFL's best first-year player in 2013 and went on to win the VFLW best and fairest in 2017.

==== Records ====
- Premierships: 9 (1996, 2006, 2007, 2008, 2009, 2010, 2013, 2014, 2015)
- Grand final appearances: 12 (1996, 2005, 2006, 2007, 2008, 2009, 2010, 2011, 2012, 2013, 2014, 2015)
- Premierships (reserves): 4 (2007, 2009, 2010, 2011)

==== Individual awards ====
- Helen Lambert Medallists (league best and fairest): Kris Gardiner (1992), Bronwyn Hutchinson (1997), Daisy Pearce (2009, 2010, 2011, 2013, 2014, 2015)
- Rohenna Young Medallists (leading goalkicker): Moana Hope (2006, 2007, 2008), Jane Lange (2010)
- Lisa Hardeman Medallists (best on ground in grand final): Kathy Zacharopoulos (2006), Roi Boutsikakis (2007), Moana Hope (2008), Sarah Hammond (2009), Aasta O'Connor (2010), Melissa Hickey (2013), Daisy Pearce (2014), Darcy Vescio (2015)
- Debbie Lee Medallists (best first-year player): Daisy Pearce (2005), Katie Brennan (2013)

=== 2016–present: VFL Women's ===
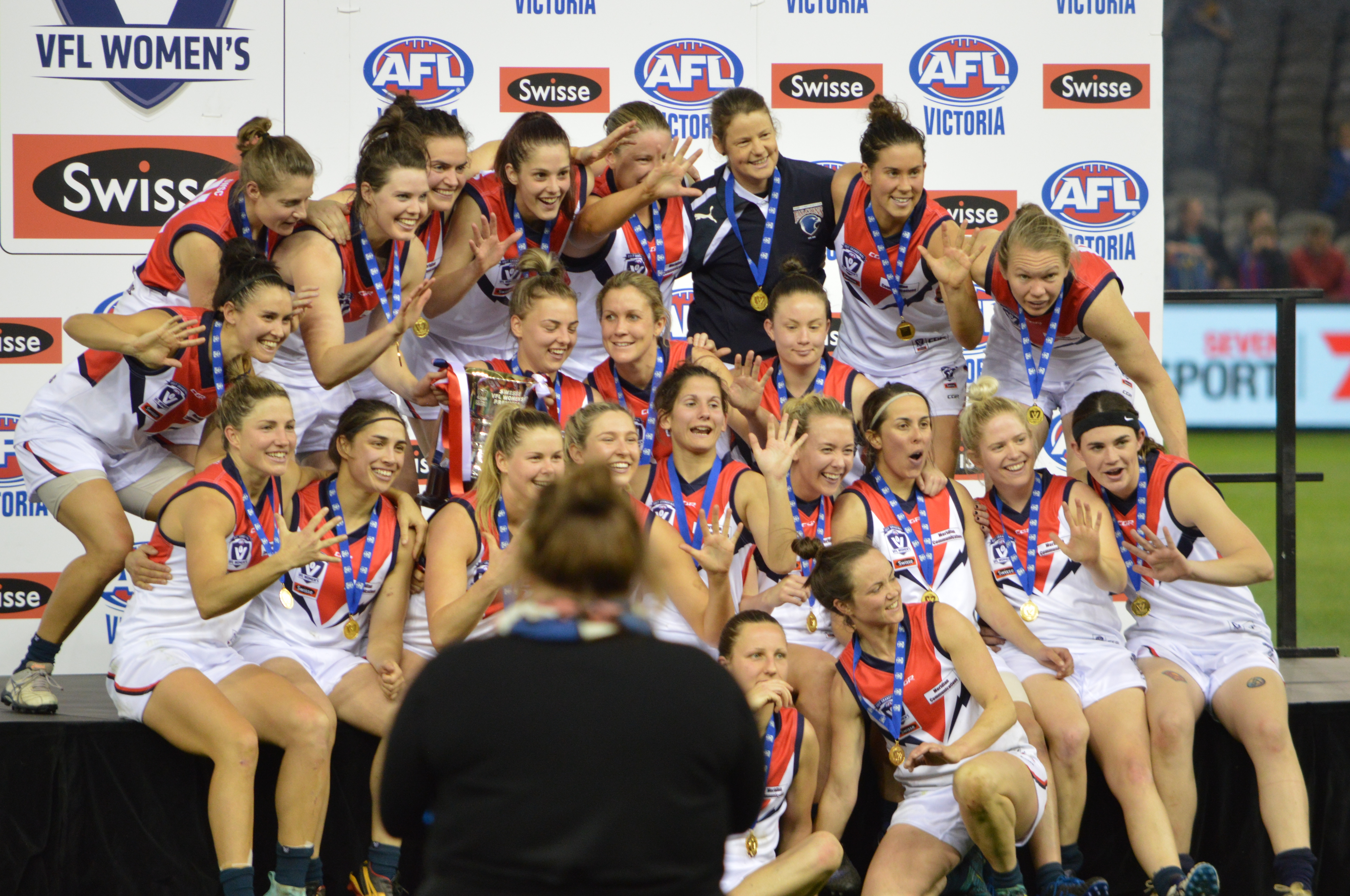
The Darebin Falcons celebrate their victory in the 2017 VFLW grand final.

Correct to the end of the 2019 season.

==== Records ====
- Premierships: 2 (2016, 2017)
- Grand final appearances: 2 (2016, 2017)
- Highest score: 18.8 (116) vs. Western Bulldogs, 2016
- Lowest score: 0.1 (1) vs. Collingwood, 2019

==== Individual awards ====
- Lambert–Pearce Medallists (best and fairest): Daisy Pearce (2016), Katie Brennan (2017), Lauren Pearce (2019)
- Rohenna Young Medallists: Katie Brennan (2017), Monique DeMatteo (2024)
- Lisa Hardeman Medallists: Darcy Vescio (2016), Karen Paxman (2017)
- Debbie Lee Medallists: None

=== Silver Jubilee team ===
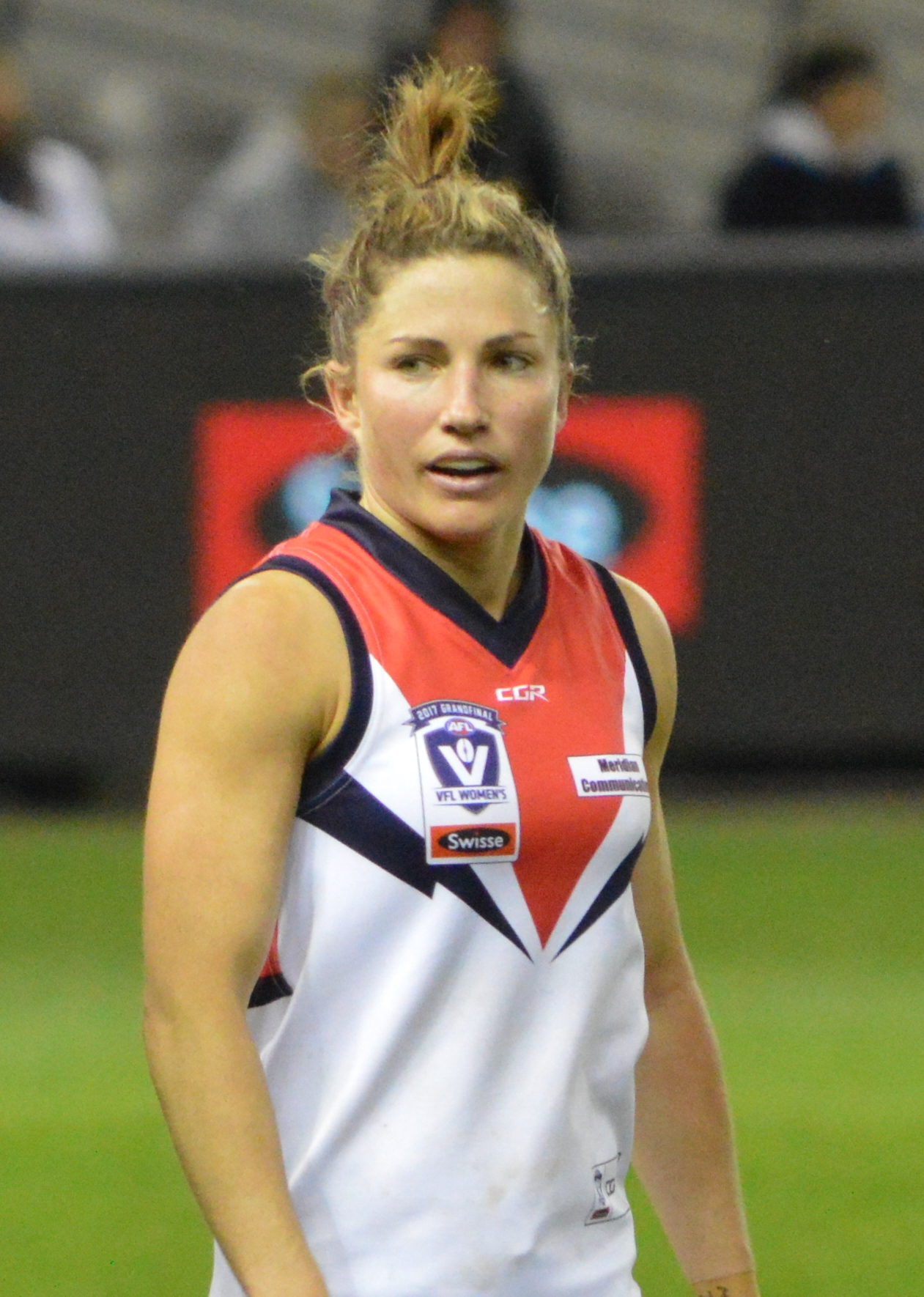
Melissa Hickey was a half-back in Darebin's Silver Jubilee side.

In 2015, a four-member club panel selected a Silver Jubilee team, made up of the best Darebin coach and players from their twenty-five years of football.

Silver Jubilee team
B:	Patricia Kinnersly	Roi Boutsikakis	Shevaun Hogan
HB:	Melissa Hickey	Kerryn Stephens (vice-captain)	Yasmin Horsham
C:	Natalie Wood	Daisy Pearce (captain)	Monique Kelly
HF:	Anna McIlroy	Bronwyn Hutchinson	Lauren Arnell
F:	Jane Lange	Moana Hope	Kate Burke
Foll:	Aasta O'Connor	Sarah Hammond	Kathy Zacharopoulos
Int:	Kris Gardiner	Anna Schwager	Georgina Thompson
Int:	Anna Brown		
Coach:	Peta Searle		
