= AFL Women's National Championship =

National and international competition in Women's Australian

- Sport: Australian rules football
- Founded: 1992
- Folded: 2013
- No. of teams: 11
- Country: Australia (one team from Papua New Guinea)
- Last champion: Victoria
- Most titles: Victoria (14 titles)

The AFL Women's National Championship was the premier national and international competition in Women's Australian rules football. The championship was held every year between 1992 and 2007, and then biennially from 2009 to 2013.

The tournament was organised by the sport's governing body in Australia, Women's Football Australia (WFA), with the Australian Football League taking control of its operations in 2010.

Following the 2013 edition, the AFL shifted its focus to a series of branded exhibition matches from 2013 through 2016 before the ultimate formation of the AFL Women's (AFLW) league in 2017. This came alongside other associated competitions including the AFL Women's Under 18 Championships and the NAB League Girls; with this, the raison d'etre for the Championships and Women's Football Australia ceased to exist, and both ceased operations.

== Championships ==
Teams representing all six of Australia's states and both of Australia's main territories competed at the Championships. From 2005 to 2007, a Victorian under-19 side competed along with their senior team, and in Perth in 2009 there were two Western Australian teams: a main team in division 1 and a team called "Host Western Australia" in division 2. The 2013 tournament featured Arafura, a team consisting of players from the Northern Territory, Far North Queensland and Papua New Guinea. An Australian Defence Force representative team also featured at multiple Championships.

Legend
Yes	Competed (in tournament without divisions)
Yes ^{1}	Competed in division 1
Yes ^{2}	Competed in division 2
No	Did not compete

Year	Location	Participating teams											
Year	Location	ACT	ADF	Arafura	NSW	NT	Qld	SA	Tas	Vic senior	Vic under-19	WA	Host WA
1998	Melbourne, Victoria	No	No	No	Yes	No	No	Yes	No	Yes	No	Yes	No
1999	Perth, Western Australia	Yes	No	No	No	No	No	Yes (Note: At the 1999 competition, South Australia were represented by SAWFL club Edwardstown.)	No	Yes	No	Yes	No
2000	Canberra, Australian Capital Territory	Yes	No	No	Yes	Yes	No	No	No	Yes	No	No	No
2001	Melbourne, Victoria	Yes	Yes	No	Yes	No	No	Yes	No	Yes	No	No	No
2002	Sydney, New South Wales	Yes	Yes	No	Yes	Yes	No	Yes	No	Yes	No	No	No
2003	Darwin, Northern Territory	Yes	Yes	No	Yes	Yes	Yes	Yes	No	Yes	No	Yes	No
2004	Adelaide, South Australia	Yes	Yes	No	Yes	Yes	No	Yes	No	Yes	No	No	No
2005	Melbourne, Victoria	Yes	No	No	Yes	Yes	Yes	Yes	No	Yes	Yes	Yes	No
2006	Sydney, New South Wales	Yes	Yes	No	Yes	Yes	Yes	Yes	No	Yes	Yes	Yes	No
2007	Canberra, Australian Capital Territory	Yes	Yes	No	Yes	No	Yes	Yes	No	Yes	Yes	Yes	No
2009	Perth, Western Australia	Yes ^{1}	No	No	Yes ^{2}	Yes ^{2}	Yes ^{1}	Yes ^{2}	No	Yes ^{1}	No	Yes ^{1}	Yes ^{2}
2011	Adelaide, South Australia	Yes ^{2}	No	No	Yes ^{2}	Yes ^{2}	Yes ^{1}	Yes ^{1}	Yes ^{2}	Yes ^{1}	No	Yes ^{1}	No
2013	Cairns, Queensland	Yes ^{2}	No	Yes ^{2}	Yes ^{1}	No	Yes ^{1}	Yes ^{2}	Yes ^{2}	Yes ^{1}	No	Yes ^{1}	No

== See also ==
- AFL Women's Under 18 Championships
