= Jordan Zanchetta =

Australian rules footballer (born 1995)

Personal information
- Full name: Jordan Zanchetta
- Nickname: Jay-Z
- Born: 18 March 1995 (age 31)
- Original team: Yeronga South Brisbane (QWAFL)
- Draft: No. 7, 2017 AFL Women's draft
- Debut: Round 1, 2018, Brisbane vs. Adelaide, at Norwood Oval
- Height: 156 cm (5 ft 1 in)
- Position: Midfield

Playing career^{1}
Years	Club	Games (Goals)
2018–2021	Brisbane	13 (1)
2022 (S7)	Essendon	3 (0)
Total		16 (1)
- ^{1} Playing statistics correct to the end of 2022 season 7.

Jordan Zanchetta (born 18 March 1995) is an Australian rules footballer who played for the Brisbane Lions and Essendon in the AFL Women's.

== Junior football ==
Zanchetta began playing junior football with the Jindalee Jaguars, winning the best and fairest award in the 2010 Under 15 Girls' competition while also playing at Under 18 level for the Western Thunder. In 2013 while playing for Yeronga, she won the best and fairest award in the Under 18 competition while also playing in the senior competition.

== Australian Under 18 National Championships ==
Zanchetta represented Queensland at the 2012 and 2013 AFL Youth Girls National Championships and was selected in the All-Australian team in both years as well as being nominated for the Rising Star award in 2012.

== AFL Queensland Women's League ==
In 2012, Zanchetta moved to Yeronga South Brisbane to play in the AFL Queensland Women's League (known as the QAFLW from 2019). As of the beginning of the 2021 season, Zanchetta had played in four Grand Finals for three victories (2012, 2017, 2020) and one loss (2013), been adjudged Best on Ground in the 2013 and 2020 Grand Finals, and twice won the competition's Best and Fairest award (2015 and 2020). She has also been named in the official Team of the Year on four occasions (2013, 2014, 2015 and 2019).

== AFLW career ==
After missing the inaugural AFLW season with an anterior cruciate ligament injury, Zanchetta was recruited by Brisbane with its first pick (seventh overall) of the 2017 AFL Women's draft. She was described as "the most talented player not to appear in the first instalment of AFLW". Zanchetta made her debut in the Lions' game against Adelaide at Norwood Oval in the opening round of the 2018 season. Zanchetta played five games for the Brisbane in 2018 and six in 2019, scoring her first goal in Brisbane's win over the Western Bulldogs at Whitten Oval in Round 4, but was not selected again until Round 2 of the 2021 season. In June 2021, she was delisted by Brisbane.

In May 2022, Zanchetta signed with AFL Women's expansion club Essendon for their inaugural season, after playing for their VFLW side. At the end of the season, she was delisted after playing three games.

Prior to the first AFLW competition in 2017, Zanchetta was selected by the Western Bulldogs to play in the Hampson–Hardeman Cup exhibition matches against Melbourne.

== Personal life ==
Zanchetta has a twin brother, Liam, and younger sister, Brooke. She grew up practising gymnastics before discovering Australian rules football in high school, and was educated at Centenary State High School. Apart from football, she works at a pet motel in Brisbane.
