= Peta Searle =

Personal information
- Full name: Peta Searle

Coaching career^{3}
| Years | Club | Games (W–L–D) |
| 2020–2021 | St Kilda (W) | 15 (5–10–0) |
- ^{3} Coaching statistics correct as of 2021.

Peta Searle is a former Australian rules footballer and coach. Searle was senior coach of the St Kilda Football Club in the AFL Women's competition (AFLW) from 2020 to 2021. Searle was previously the first woman appointed as an assistant coach in the Australian Football League when she was joined St Kilda as a development coach in 2014.

== Playing career ==
Searle played football for ten years. Searle started her playing career with the Scorpions at the age of 20 and then moved onto the Albion Football Club, Parkside Football Club and then the Darebin Falcons. She played over 100 games, won five premierships, represented Victoria on seven occasions and was named in the All-Australian team three times.

Searle was named in the Victorian Women's Football League (VWFL) Team of the 1990s and in the backline of the VWFL Silver Jubilee Team. She became a VWFL life member in 2011.

== Coaching career ==
Searle began her coaching career in 2005. She coached the inaugural Victorian under-19 side in 2005. Searle became head coach of the Darebin Falcons VWFL team in 2006 and coached them to five premierships from 2006 to 2010. She was named Victorian Female Coach of the Year in 2010. Searle was appointed the coach of the Darebin Falcons Silver Jubilee Football Team in 2015.

Searle was a development coach at the Western Jets in 2011. In 2011 and 2013, she was the head coach of Women's Victorian State Team in the AFL Women's National Championship and was named the All Australian Coach of the 2011 AFL Women's National Championship. She was also the Head Coach of the AFL Victoria VWFL Academy between 2012 & 2014.

She debuted as a coach for Victorian Football League team Port Melbourne Football Club on 25 March 2012 and coached there under Gary Ayres in 2012 and 2013.

Searle then coached the Western Bulldogs in the first AFL women's exhibition game in 2013 and the second game in 2014. She was also the assistant coach at VAFA team St Kevin’s Old Boys in 2014.

Searle joined the Saints as a development coach in 2014, making her the AFL’s first full-time female assistant coach. In 2018, she was appointed the Head of Female Football Pathways and coach of the Saints' first ever affiliated female team in the VFL Women's competition.

On 17 April 2019, Searle was appointed the head coach of the St Kilda Football Club ahead of them entering the AFL Women's competition in 2020. Searle stepped down from the role at the conclusion of the 2021 AFL Women's season.

=== Coaching statistics ===
Legend
| W | Wins | L | Losses | D | Draws | W% | Winning percentage | LP | Ladder position | LT | League teams |

| Season | Team | Games | W | L | D | W % | LP | LT |
|---|---|---|---|---|---|---|---|---|
| 2020 | St Kilda | 6 | 2 | 4 | 0 | 33% | 5 (conf.) | 7 (conf.) |
| 2021 | St Kilda | 9 | 3 | 6 | 0 | 33% | 11 | 14 |
| Career totals | | 15 | 5 | 10 | 0 | 33% | | |

== Honours and achievements ==
Searle won the Female Coach of the Year in the Victorian Australian Football Coaches Association (AFCA) Awards in 2010. In 2012, the Victorian Australian Football Coaches Association (AFCA) named the award after her and it is now known as the Peta Searle Female Coach of the Year Award.

Searle was inducted into the Victorian Honour Roll of Women in 2017.

Searle received a Medal of the Order of Australia (OAM) for services to the AFL in the Queen Birthday Honours on 10 June 2019. In October 2019 she was named one of The Australian Financial Review's 100 Women of Influence in the category of Arts, Culture and Sport.

== Other work ==
Searle was a physical education teacher at Brighton Secondary College between 1996 and 2014.

== Personal life ==
Searle has two children, Tessa and Jackson.
