= Sal Rees =

Australian rules footballer (1966–2024)

- Rees in 1995

Personal information
- Full name: Sally Rees
- Born: 21 September 1966
- Died: 23 December 2024 (aged 58)

Playing career
Years	Club	Games (Goals)
199?−200?	Darebin	200+

Coaching career
Years	Club	Games (W–L–D)
2001−2002	Darebin	

Career highlights
- VWFL premiership player: 1996

Sally Rees (21 September 1966 – 23 December 2024) was an Australian rules footballer and official.

Widely considered a pioneer of women's football, Rees was the first person to play 200 games in the Victorian Women's Football League (VWFL). She was a founding member of the Darebin Women's Sports Club, and was also involved with the Pascoe Vale Sports Club as a player and coach.

== Career ==
The Fairfield Falcons Football Club was formed in 1987, but the club was on the verge of folding by 1990. A group of women wanting to play football, including Rees, revived the club under the same name and the Falcons returned to the Victorian Women's Football League (VWFL) in 1991. Rees became the club's president in 1994.

In 1995, Rees caused controversy when she became the first women to nominate for the draft of the men's Australian Football League (AFL). Rees wanted to promote women playing football, and her nomination resulted in the AFL amending its draft rules to prevent such an incident happening again. The following year, she played in the Falcons' inaugural VWFL premiership.

Rees instigated the club's name change to "Darebin Falcons" in 2000. She became Darebin's playing coach in 2001 but stepped down from the role at the end of the 2002 VWFL season.

In 2005, Rees became the first person to play 200 games in the VWFL.

== Personal life and death ==
Rees suffered catastrophic brain damage following a brain aneurysm on 21 December 2024, and died in hospital two days later surrounded by family members, including her wife Barb. AFL CEO Andrew Dillon was among those who paid tribute to Rees, saying the AFL Women's competition "would be impossible without the vision, determination and passion of trailblazers in women's football like Sal Rees".
