= 2020 VFL Women's season =

Cancelled 5th season of the VFL Women's

- Premiers: Premiership not contested

The 2020 VFL Women's season was meant to have been the fifth season of the VFL Women's (VFLW), the state-level senior women's Australian rules football competition in Victoria. However, the season was cancelled due to the COVID-19 pandemic.

== Clubs ==
=== Venues and affiliations ===
| Club | Home venue(s) | Capacity | AFLW affiliation |
|---|---|---|---|
| Carlton | Ikon Park | 24,500 | Carlton |
| Carlton | Tony Sheehan Oval | 1,110 | Carlton |
| Casey | Casey Fields | 9,000 | Melbourne |
| Collingwood | Victoria Park | 10,000 | Collingwood |
| Darebin | Bill Lawry Oval | 3,000 | — |
| Darebin | Preston City Oval | 5,000 | — |
| Essendon | Windy Hill | 10,000 | Essendon |
| Geelong Cats | Colac Central Reserve | 10,000 | Geelong |
| Geelong Cats | Deakin University | 10,000 | Geelong |
| Geelong Cats | GMHBA Stadium | 36,000 | Geelong |
| Hawthorn | Box Hill City Oval | 10,000 | — |
| North Melbourne | Arden Street Oval | 4,000 | North Melbourne |
| North Melbourne | Avalon Airport Oval | 8,000 | North Melbourne |
| Richmond | Swinburne Centre | 2,800 | Richmond |
| Southern Saints | RSEA Park | 8,000 | St Kilda |
| Southern Saints | WS Trevor Barker Beach Oval | 6,000 | St Kilda |
| Western Bulldogs | VU Whitten Oval | 10,000 | Western Bulldogs |
| Williamstown | Downer Oval | 6,000 | — |

== Impact of the COVID-19 pandemic ==
=== Season suspension ===
Preparations for the 2020 season featured twelve teams, eleven of which had participated in 2019. The changes in league membership came about after Melbourne University transferred its license to North Melbourne after ten years of partnership between the clubs, and Northern Territory folded in September 2019.

The 2020 fixture was released on 5 February 2020, with Western Bulldogs scheduled to play Darebin on 9 May in the season opener as part of a 14-match home-and-away season over 16 rounds, followed by a four-week finals series ending on 20 September.

The season was disrupted by the COVID-19 pandemic, which was formally declared a pandemic on 11 March 2020. The start of the VFLW season was suspended indefinitely on 16 March.

=== Cancellation and planned Super Series ===
After months of uncertainty, it was announced on 16 June 2020 that the VFLW season would be cancelled. Instead, a four-team "Super Series" would be held in September 2020 to allow for 120 players to push for inclusion on an AFL Women's (AFLW) list in 2021.

On 7 July, the second wave of COVID-19 cases across Melbourne resulted in a new lockdown being imposed by the state government, which all but precluded organised sport in the state until at least 19 August (ultimately lasting several months beyond that). The 2020 VFL season was cancelled outright the following day, before the decision was made to cancel the planned VFLW Super Series one month later on 4 August.

== See also ==
- 2020 VFL season
