= 1998 AFL Women's National Championships =

1998 AFL Women's National Championships
Host	Victoria
States	7
Winners	Victoria-Senior
Runner-up	Western Australia
3rd Place	Queensland
Final
117–30

The 1998 AFL Women's National Championships took place in Melbourne, Victoria, Australia. The tournament began on 19 June and ended on 24 June 1998. The 1998 tournament was the 7th Championship. The Senior-vics of Victoria won the 1998 Championship, defeating Western Australia in the final. It was Victoria's 8th consecutive title.

== Ladder ==
1. Victoria-Senior
2. Western Australia
3. Queensland
4. Australian Capital Territory
5. Northern Territory
6. Australian Capital Territory
7. South Australia
8. New South Wales

== All-Australian Team ==
Jessica Morris (1st Ruck)

Wendy Jeffries (wing)

Clea Smith (Centre Half Back)
