= 2004 AFL Women's National Championships =

2004 AFL Women's National Championships
Host	South Australia
States	8
Winners	Victoria-Senior
Runner-up	Western Australia
3rd Place	Queensland
Final
120 - 10

The 2004 AFL Women's National Championships took place in Adelaide, South Australia, Australia. The tournament began on 19 June and ended on 24 June 2004. The 2004 tournament was the 13th Championship. The Senior-vics of Victoria won the 2004 Championship, defeating the U19-vics of Victoria in the final. It was Victoria's 13th consecutive title.

== Ladder ==
1. Victoria
2. Western Australia
3. Queensland
4. Northern Territory
5. Australian Capital Territory
6. South Australia
7. New South Wales
8. Australian Defence Force
