= Kate Tyndall =

Australian rules footballer (born 1983)

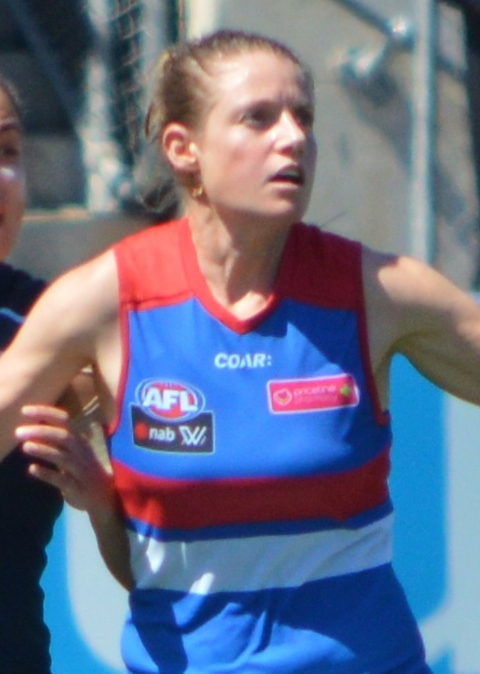
- Tyndall in March 2017

Personal information
- Born: 12 December 1983 (age 42)
- Original team: Darebin Falcons (VFL Women's)
- Draft: No. 117, 2016 AFL Women's draft
- Debut: Round 1, 2017, Western Bulldogs vs. Fremantle, at VU Whitten Oval
- Height: 167 cm (5 ft 6 in)
- Position: Midfielder

Playing career^{1}
Years	Club	Games (Goals)
2017	Western Bulldogs	7 (0)
- ^{1} Playing statistics correct to the end of 2017.

Kate Tyndall (born 12 November 1983) is an Australian rules footballer who played for the Western Bulldogs in the AFL Women's competition.

== Career ==
Tyndal was drafted by the Western Bulldogs with their 15th selection and 117th overall in the 2016 AFL Women's draft. She made her debut in the thirty-two point win against Fremantle at VU Whitten Oval in the opening round of the 2017 season. She played every match in her debut season to finish with seven games. She was delisted at the conclusion of the 2017 season.

== Personal life ==
Tyndall lives in Abbotsford, Victoria with her partner, fellow AFLW player Aasta O'Connor.
