= 2000 AFL Women's National Championships =

2000 AFL Women's National Championships
Host	Victoria
States	7
Winners	Victoria-Senior
Runner-up	Western Australia
3rd Place	Queensland
Final
116–30

The 2000 AFL Women's National Championships took place in Melbourne, Victoria, Australia. The tournament began on 29 June and ended on 4 July 2000. The 2000 tournament was the ninth Championship. The Senior-vics of Victoria won the 2000 Championship, defeating Western Australia in the final. It was Victoria's ninth consecutive title.

== Ladder ==
1. Victoria-Senior
2. Western Australia
3. Queensland
4. Australian Capital Territory
5. Northern Territory
6. Australian Capital Territory
7. South Australia
8. New South Wales
