= 1999 AFL Women's National Championships =

1999 AFL Women's National Championships
Host	Western Australia
States	7
Winners	Victoria-Senior
Runner-up	Western Australia
3rd Place	Queensland
Final
105 - 40

The 1999 AFL Women's National Championships took place in Perth, Western Australia, Australia. The tournament began on 19 June and ended on 24 June 1999. The 1999 tournament was the 8th Championship. The Senior-vics of Victoria won the 1999 Championship, defeating Western Australia in the final. It was Victoria's 9th consecutive title.

== Ladder ==
1. Victoria-Senior
2. Western Australia
3. Queensland
4. Australian Capital Territory
5. Northern Territory
6. Australian Capital Territory
7. South Australia
8. New South Wales
