= 2003 AFL Women's National Championships =

2003 AFL Women's National Championships
Host	Northern Territory
States	8
Winners	Victoria-Senior
Runner-up	Queensland
3rd Place	Northern Territory
Final
110 - 30

The 2003 AFL Women's National Championships took place in Darwin, Northern Territory, Australia. The tournament began on 19 June and ended on 24 June 2003. The 2003 tournament was the 12th Championship. The Senior-vics of Victoria won the 2003 Championship, defeating Queensland in the final. It was Victoria's 12th consecutive title.

== Ladder ==
1. Victoria-Senior
2. Queensland
3. Northern Territory
4. Western Australia
5. Australian Capital Territory
6. South Australia
7. New South Wales
8. Australian Defence Force
