= 2002 AFL Women's National Championships =

2002 AFL Women's National Championships
Host	New South Wales
States	7
Winners	Victoria-Senior
Runner-up	Australian Capital Territory
3rd Place	Western Australia
Final
115–30

The 2002 AFL Women's National Championships took place in Sydney, New South Wales, Australia. The tournament began on 29 June and ended on the 4 July 2002. The 2002 tournament was the eleventh Championship. The Senior-vics of Victoria won the 2002 Championship, defeating the Australian Capital Territory in the final. It was Victoria's 11th consecutive title.

== Ladder ==
1. Victoria-Senior
2. Australian Capital Territory
3. Western Australia
4. Queensland
5. Northern Territory
6. South Australia
7. New South Wales
