= 2001 AFL Women's National Championships =

2001 AFL Women's National Championships
Host	Queensland
States	7
Winners	Victoria-Senior
Runner-up	Queensland
3rd Place	Western Australia
Final
116 - 30

The 2001 AFL Women's National Championships took place in Brisbane, Queensland, Australia. The tournament began on 29 June and ended on 4 July 2001. The 2001 tournament was the 10th Championship. The Senior-vics of Victoria won the 2001 Championship, defeating Queensland in the final. It was Victoria's 10th consecutive title.

== Ladder ==
1. Victoria-Senior
2. Queensland
3. Western Australia
4. Australian Capital Territory
5. Northern Territory
6. Australian Capital Territory
7. South Australia
8. New South Wales
