= Natalie Wood (coach) =

Australian rules footballer and coach

- Wood during a match with Essendon in 2026

Coaching career^{3}
| Years | Club | Games (W–L–D) |
| 2022 (S7)–2026 | Essendon (W) | 57 (22–34–1) |
- ^{3} Coaching statistics correct as of round 12, 2026.

Natalie Wood is a former Australian rules footballer and current senior coach of the Essendon Football Club in the AFL Women's (AFLW). Wood was the first woman to coach 50 AFLW games.

== Playing career ==
Wood played 190 games for the Darebin Falcons and Melbourne University in the Victorian Women's Football League, and represented the Western Bulldogs in women's exhibition matches in 2013 and 2014.

== Coaching career ==
After retiring as a player in 2014, Wood joined the Geelong Football Club as a part-time assistant coach for the club's inaugural women's team that joined the VFL Women's (VFLW) in 2017. Wood was then appointed to a full-time coaching role with Geelong as an assistant coach for the club's first season in the national AFLW competition in 2019. As part of this role, she was also promoted to senior coach of Geelong's VFLW team. This appointment meant that Wood was the first woman to attain a full-time coaching role with the club.

On 18 March 2022, Wood was appointed as the inaugural coach of the Essendon Football Club's AFL Women's (AFLW) team.

In October 2026, Wood was informed that her contract would not be renewed with two games remaining, but was allowed to coach out the season.

== Coaching statistics ==
Updated to the end of round 11, 2026.

Legend
| W | Wins | L | Losses | D | Draws | % | Win percentage |
| † | Team qualified for finals |

| Season | Team | Ladder | Home-and-away season | | | | | Finals | | | | | Total | | | | | | | | | | | | | | | | | | | |
| Season | Team | Ladder | Games | W | L | D | % | Games | W | L | D | % | Games | W | L | D | % | | | | | | | | | | | | | | | |
|---|---|---|---|---|---|---|---|---|---|---|---|---|---|---|---|---|---|---|---|---|---|---|---|---|---|---|---|---|---|---|---|---|
| 2022 (S7) | Essendon | 10 / 18 | Games | W | L | D | % | Games | W | L | D | % | Games | W | L | D | % | 10 | 4 | 6 | 0 | 40.0 | 0 | — | — | — | — | 10 | 4 | 6 | 0 | 40.0 |
| 2023 | Essendon | 7 / 18^{†} | 11 | 6 | 5 | 0 | 54.6 | 1 | 0 | 1 | 0 | 0.0 | 12 | 6 | 6 | 0 | 50.0 | | | | | | | | | | | | | | | |
| 2024 | Essendon | 8 / 18^{†} | 11 | 6 | 4 | 1 | 59.1 | 1 | 0 | 1 | 0 | 0.0 | 12 | 6 | 5 | 1 | 54.2 | | | | | | | | | | | | | | | |
| 2025 | Essendon | 14 / 18 | 12 | 4 | 8 | 0 | 33.3 | 0 | — | — | — | — | 12 | 4 | 8 | 0 | 33.3 | | | | | | | | | | | | | | | |
| 2026 | Essendon | 16 / 18 | 11 | 1 | 10 | 0 | 9.1 | | | | | | 11 | 1 | 10 | 0 | 9.1 | | | | | | | | | | | | | | | |
| Career | | | 55 | 21 | 33 | 1 | 39.1 | 2 | 0 | 2 | 0 | 0.0 | 57 | 21 | 35 | 1 | 37.7 | | | | | | | | | | | | | | | |

== Personal life ==
As well as full-time coaching, Wood is a high school teacher.
