= Tiah Toth =

Australian rules footballer (born 1993)

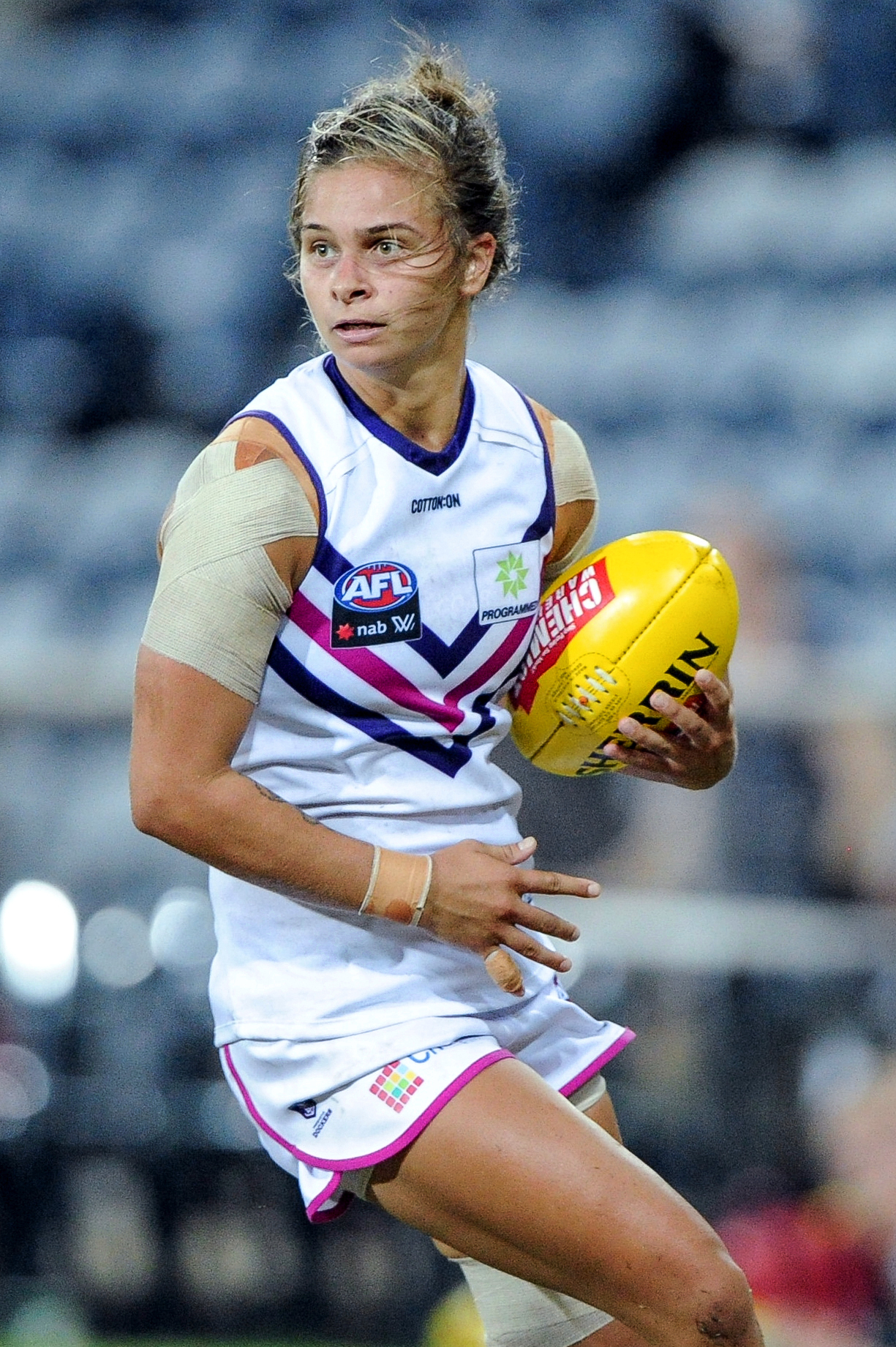
- Toth playing for Fremantle in January 2018

Personal information
- Born: 25 May 1993 (age 33)
- Original team: Coastal Titans (WAWFL)
- Draft: No. 36, 2016 AFL Women's draft
- Debut: Round 1, 2017, Fremantle vs. Western Bulldogs, at VU Whitten Oval
- Height: 167 cm (5 ft 6 in)
- Position: Defender

Playing career^{1}
Years	Club	Games (Goals)
2017–2018;2021–2022	Fremantle	24 (1)
- ^{1} Playing statistics correct to the end of the 2022 season.

Tiah Toth (née Haynes, born 25 May 1993) is an Australian rules footballer who played for the Fremantle Football Club in the AFL Women's competition.

== AFLW career ==
Of indigenous Australian heritage from her father's side, her introduction to the sport was through the Auskick program.

She was first drafted in 2014 at pick No.1 for the Western Bulldogs however just six days after her drafting she suffered a career threatening knee injury and was eventually delisted by the club.

Toth was drafted by Fremantle with their fifth selection and thirty-sixth overall in the 2016 AFL Women's draft. She made her debut in the thirty-two point loss to the Western Bulldogs at VU Whitten Oval in the opening round of the 2017 season. She played the first three matches of the season before missing the remainder of the season due to a shoulder injury. She was delisted by Fremantle at the end of the 2018 season.

In the 2020 AFL Women's draft, Toth was re-drafted by Fremantle with their third selection after performing well for Subiaco in the WAFL Women's league. She returned to the AFLW side in the opening round of the 2021 AFL Women's season. It was announced she re-signed with the Dockers on 5 June 2021.

In April 2022, Toth was delisted by Fremantle.

== Personal life ==
Her father, John Haynes, played 54 games for Perth in the WAFL.

== Statistics ==
Statistics are correct to the end of the 2021 season.

Legend
G	Goals	K	Kicks	D	Disposals	T	Tackles
B	Behinds	H	Handballs	M	Marks

Season	Team	No.	Games	Totals							Averages (per game)							Votes
Season	Team	No.	Games	G	B	K	H	D	M	T	G	B	K	H	D	M	T	Votes
2017	Fremantle	6	3	0	0	13	6	19	2	5	0.0	0.0	4.3	2.0	6.3	0.7	1.7	0
2018	Fremantle	6	3	0	0	15	8	23	4	9	0.0	0.0	5.0	2.7	7.7	1.3	3.0	0
2019	—	—	0	—	—	—	—	—	—	—	—	—	—	—	—	—	—	—
2020	—	—	0	—	—	—	—	—	—	—	—	—	—	—	—	—	—	—
2021	Fremantle	33	10	1	2	89	26	115	19	41	0.1	0.2	8.9	2.6	11.5	1.9	4.1	1
Career			16	1	2	117	40	157	25	55	0.1	0.1	7.3	2.5	9.8	1.6	3.4	1
