= Brooke Whyte =

Australian rules footballer (born 1990)

Personal information
- Born: 25 February 1995 (age 31)
- Original team: Coastal Titans (WAWFL)
- Debut: Round 4, 2017, Fremantle vs. Adelaide, at Fremantle Oval

Playing career^{1}
Years	Club	Games (Goals)
2017	Fremantle	4 (0)
- ^{1} Playing statistics correct to the end of 2017.

Brooke Whyte (born 25 February 1995) is an Australian rules footballer who played for the Fremantle Football Club in the AFL Women's competition. Whyte was recruited by Fremantle as an injury replacement player for Tiah Haynes in February 2017. She made her debut in the twenty-three point loss to Adelaide at Fremantle Oval in round four of the 2017 season. She played every match after her debut game to finish with four matches for the season. She was delisted at the end of the 2017 season.
