= Lauren Morecroft =

Australian rules footballer (born 1987)

Personal information
- Full name: Lauren Jessica Morecroft
- Nickname: LJ
- Born: 4 May 1987 (age 39)
- Original team: Diamond Creek (VFL Women's)
- Draft: No. 101, 2016 AFL Women's draft
- Debut: Round 4, 2017, Western Bulldogs vs. Collingwood, at VU Whitten Oval
- Height: 168 cm (5 ft 6 in)
- Position: Defender

Playing career^{1}
Years	Club	Games (Goals)
2017	Western Bulldogs	2 (0)
- ^{1} Playing statistics correct to the end of 2017.

Lauren Jessica Morecroft (born 4 May 1987) is an Australian rules footballer who played for the Western Bulldogs in the AFL Women's competition. Morecroft was drafted by the Western Bulldogs with their 13th selection and 101st overall in the 2016 AFL Women's draft. She made her debut in the seven point loss to Collingwood at VU Whitten Oval in round four of the 2017 season. She played two matches in her debut season. She was delisted at the conclusion of the 2017 season.
