= Lauren Spark =

Australian rules footballer

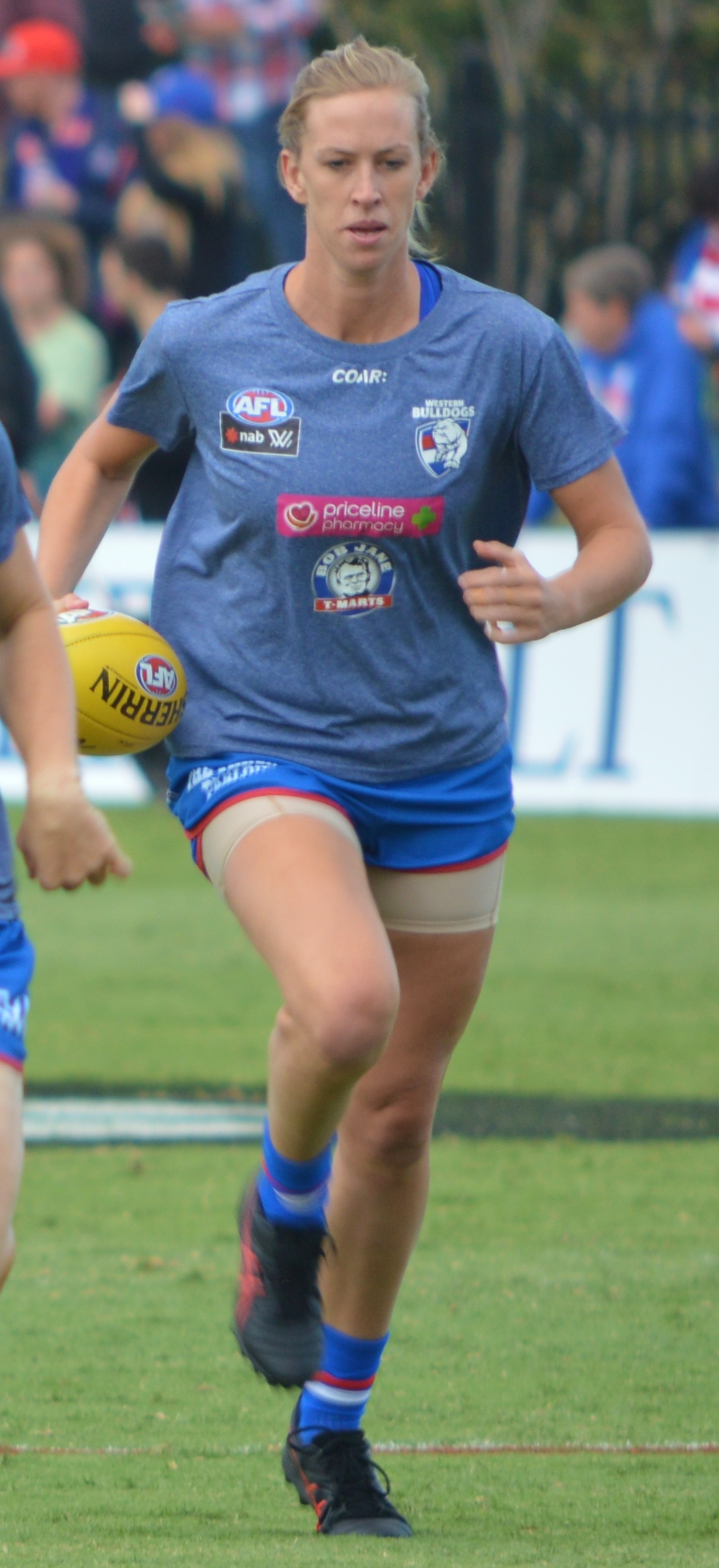
- Spark warming-up for the Western Bulldogs in February 2017

Personal information
- Born: 19 November 1985 (age 40)
- Original team: Melbourne University (VFL Women's)
- Draft: No. 76, 2016 AFL Women's draft
- Debut: Round 1, 2017, Western Bulldogs vs. Fremantle, at VU Whitten Oval
- Height: 181 cm (5 ft 11 in)
- Position: Defender

Playing career
Years	Club	Games (Goals)
2017–2021	Western Bulldogs	28 (0)

Lauren Spark (born 19 November 1985) is a retired Australian rules footballer who played for the Western Bulldogs in the AFL Women's (AFLW) competition.

== AFLW career ==
Spark was drafted by the Western Bulldogs with their tenth selection and seventy-sixth overall in the 2016 AFL Women's draft. She made her debut in the thirty-two point win against Fremantle at VU Whitten Oval in the opening round of the 2017 season. She played every match in her debut season to finish with seven games. After an ankle injury ended her 2021 season early, Spark retired at the end of the season, having played 28 games for the Western Bulldogs.
