= Renee Forth =

Australian rules footballer

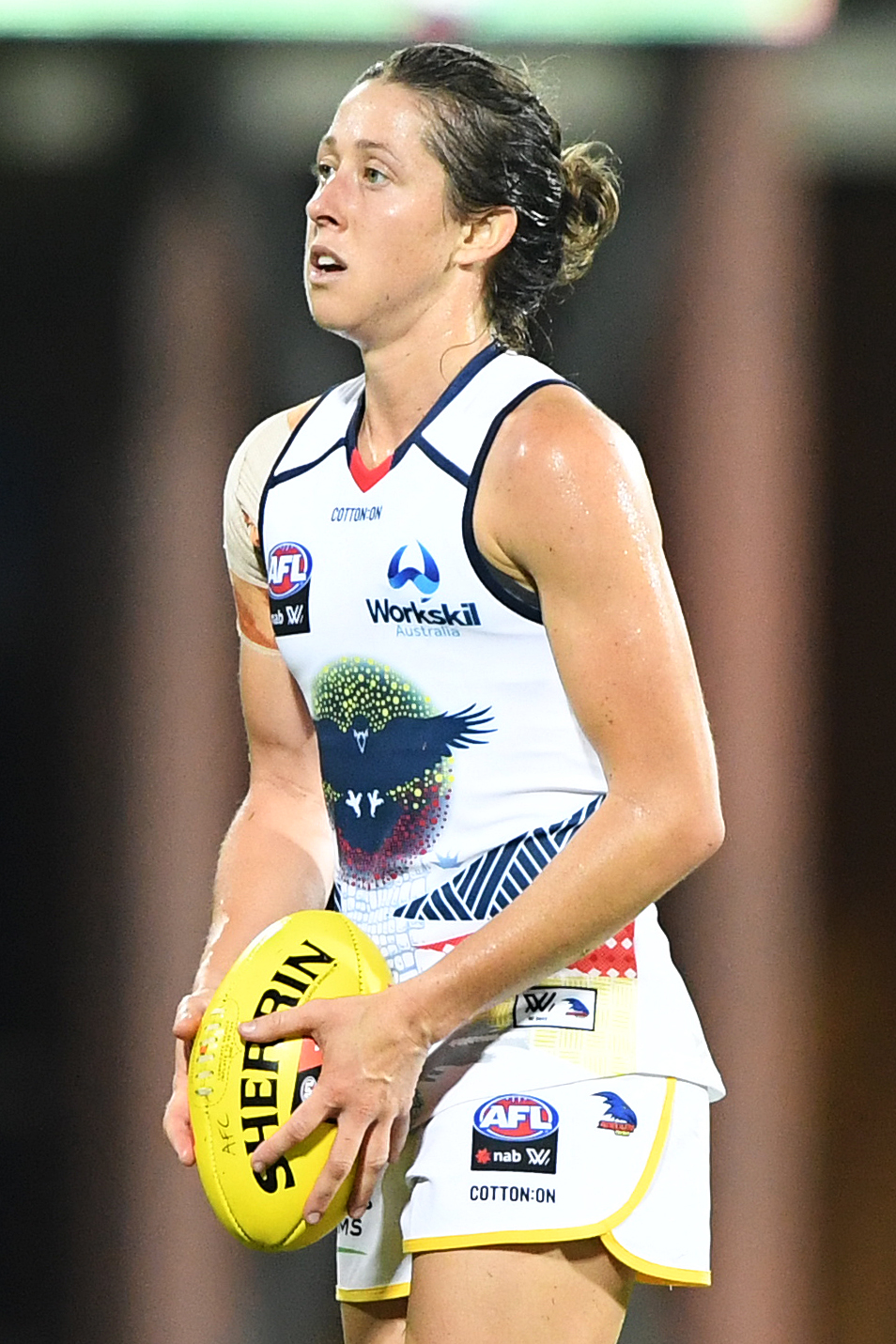
- Forth playing for Adelaide in January 2019

Personal information
- Born: 28 January 1987 (age 39)
- Original team: Coastal Titans (WAWFL)
- Height: 166 cm (5 ft 5 in)
- Position: Midfielder

Playing career^{1}
Years	Club	Games (Goals)
2017–2018	Greater Western Sydney	5 (0)
2019–2021	Adelaide	17 (2)
Total		22 (1)
- ^{1} Playing statistics correct to the end of the 2021 season.

Career highlights
- AFLW premiership player: 2019; WAWFL premiership player (2015)

Renee Forth (born 28 January 1987) is an Australian rules footballer who played for Greater Western Sydney and Adelaide in the AFL Women's (AFLW).

== Amateur career ==
Forth played state league football for the Coastal Titans in the West Australian Women's Football League (WAWFL). She played in the club's 2012 and 2015 premiership sides.

Forth captained Fremantle in the 2016 women's AFL exhibition series. Forth was appointed the 2016 WA State Female Football Ambassador serving as a role model through ongoing promotion and programs.

== AFL Women's career ==
Forth was one of two Greater Western Sydney marquee players announced prior to the inaugural 2017 season.

She ruptured her anterior cruciate ligament and medial collateral ligament in a WAWFL match in August 2016, and was ruled out for the entirety of the 2017 AFL Women's season.

She will serve as an assistant coach at the Giants in 2017.

In June 2018, Forth was traded to Adelaide.

Forth was awarded the Education and Training Excellence Award, presented by La Trobe University, for 2017 at the AFL Players’ Association’s MVP Awards night alongside Carlton’s Ed Curnow.

In May 2021, Adelaide announced that they would not offer Forth a new contract.

== Other work ==
Outside of football, Forth works as an electrician.

Forth has spent some time as a mentor, assistant coach and coach. Forth was mentor coach for the NAB AFL Women’s Academy. She was an assistant coach for the 2017 Allies team in the NAB AFL Women’s Under 18 Championships. Forth served as an assistant coach for the Allies when they took on Victoria in the NAB AFLW Under 18 Exhibition Match August 2018. Forth assistant coached the Central Allies at the 2018 AFL Under-18 Youth Girls Championship on the Gold Coast.
