= Rebecca Privitelli =

Australian rules footballer (born 1995)

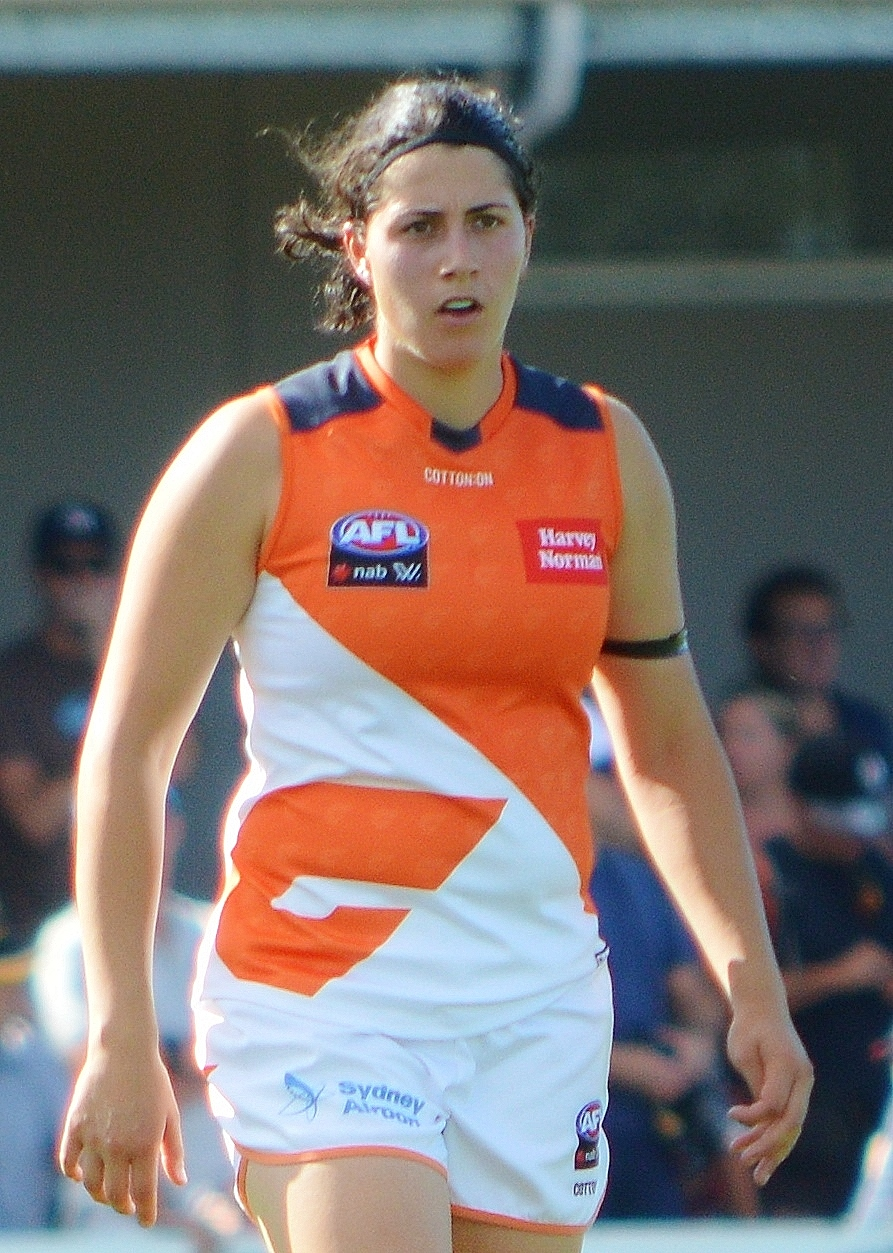
- Privitelli with Greater Western Sydney in February 2018

Personal information
- Born: 3 January 1995 (age 31)
- Original team: Eastern Devils (VFL Women's)
- Draft: No. 142, 2016 AFL Women's draft
- Debut: Round 2, 2017, Carlton vs. Greater Western Sydney, at Ikon Park
- Height: 169 cm (5 ft 7 in)
- Position: Forward

Club information
- Current club: Sydney
- Number: 19

Playing career^{1}
Years	Club	Games (Goals)
2017	Carlton	5 (1)
2018; 2020–2022 (S6)	Greater Western Sydney	23 (14)
2022 (S7)–2025	Sydney	36 (37)
Total		64 (52)
- ^{1} Playing statistics correct to the end of the 2023 season.

Rebecca Privitelli (born 3 January 1995) is an Australian rules footballer who plays for Sydney in the AFL Women's (AFLW). She previously played for Carlton and for the Greater Western Sydney Giants.

== Early life ==
Privitelli was raised in Melbourne, Victoria and played junior football in the Yarra Junior Football League with both St Marys Greensborough and Kew Rovers. During much of her junior playing days she participated in boys teams in preference to the girls teams. In 2012 she represented the League in the AFL Vic Metro Championships in 2012 winning the Peter Johnston Medal for the best YJFL player.

== AFLW career ==
She was drafted by Carlton with the club's nineteenth selection and the one hundred and forty second overall in the 2016 AFL Women's draft. She made her debut in round 2, 2017, in a match against Greater Western Sydney at Ikon Park. She was dropped from the team the following week however and would not return until the final match of the season in round 7. Privitelli finished the season having played five matches in 2017. She was delisted by Carlton at season's end and subsequently signed with Greater Western Sydney as a delisted free agent. She was delisted by Greater Western Sydney at the end of the 2018 season. Privitelli has taken an off-field role with the Giants as Merchandise Coordinator. She was drafted back to GWS ahead of the 2020 season. In April 2022, Privitelli joined expansion club and rival Sydney.
