= Bree White =

Australian rules footballer

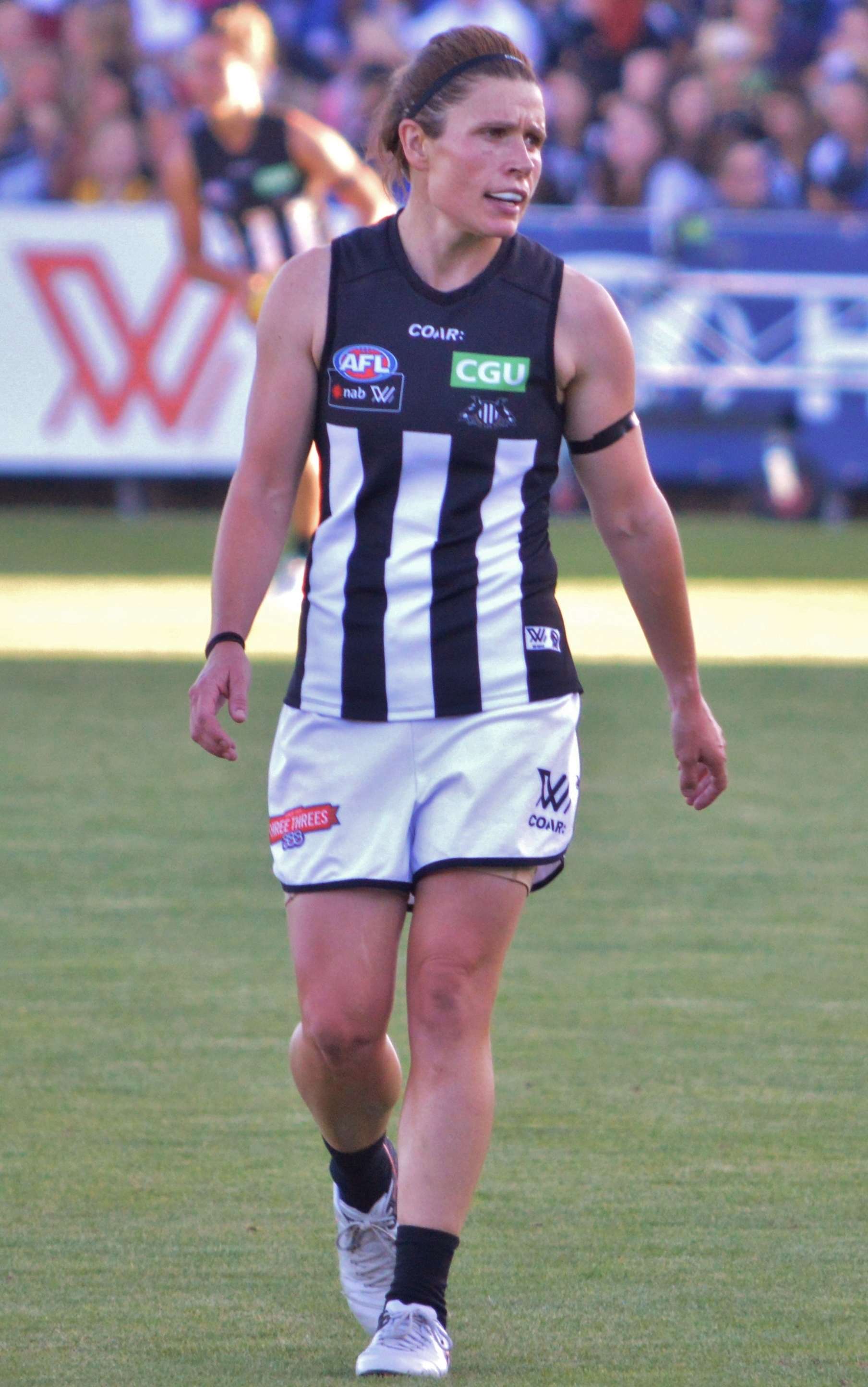
- White playing for Collingwood in February 2017

Personal information
- Full name: Bree White
- Born: 18 December 1981 (age 44); Ballarat, Victoria
- Original team: VU Western Spurs (VFLW)
- Draft: No. 38, 2016 national draft
- Debut: Round 1, 2017, Collingwood vs. Carlton, at IKON Park
- Height: 158 cm (5 ft 2 in)
- Position: Midfielder

Playing career^{1}
Years	Club	Games (Goals)
2017–2018	Collingwood	11 (1)
- ^{1} Playing statistics correct to the end of the 2018 season.

Career highlights
- All-Australian: 2011

Bree White (born 18 December 1981) is an Australian rules footballer who played for the Collingwood Football Club in the AFL Women's (AFLW).

== Early life and state football ==
White grew up in Ballarat and in her junior days acted as a boundary umpire in local matches. On the occasion that her brothers' club Dunnstown, was missing players, she would fill in. Once she reached the age when there were no more mixed teams, she represented her school Loreto College in football. At the age of 18 she joined VWFL club St Albans Spurs. In 2016, she captained the Spurs, with coach Debbie Lee saying she leads from the front.

During her time at the Spurs, White represented Victoria 3 times.

White has played for Melbourne in exhibition matches, prior to the creation of the AFLW.

== AFL Women's career ==
White made her debut in round 1, 2017, in the inaugural AFLW match at IKON Park against Carlton, in which she was one of Collingwood's best players, with 10 disposals, 6 kicks and 4 handballs. At the end of the season, she was named in Collingwood's top 10 best and fairest.

Collingwood re-signed White for the 2018 season during the trade period in May 2017.

In October 2017, together with Melbourne player Neville Jetta, White helped launch Vichealth's "Walk to School" program which encourages kids to walk, ride or scoot to school and to build healthy habits.

White retired from AFL Women's football at the conclusion of the 2018 season.

== Other sports ==
As well as playing footy, White was also a national under-23 cricketer and represented Victoria's under-19 and senior women cricket teams. She also played gaelic football with London GAA, including featuring in the All-Ireland Junior Ladies' Football Championship Final in 2007.

== Statistics ==
Statistics are correct to the end of the 2018 season.

Legend
G	Goals	K	Kicks	D	Disposals	T	Tackles
B	Behinds	H	Handballs	M	Marks

Season	Team	No.	Games	Totals							Averages (per game)						
Season	Team	No.	Games	G	B	K	H	D	M	T	G	B	K	H	D	M	T
2017	Collingwood	33	7	1	0	32	28	60	6	22	0.1	0.0	4.6	4.0	8.6	0.9	3.1
2018	Collingwood	33	4	0	0	18	16	34	10	12	0.0	0.0	4.5	4.0	8.5	2.5	3.0
Career			11	1	0	50	44	94	16	34	0.1	0.0	4.5	4.0	8.5	1.5	3.1
