= Madeline Keryk =

Australian rules footballer (born 1995)

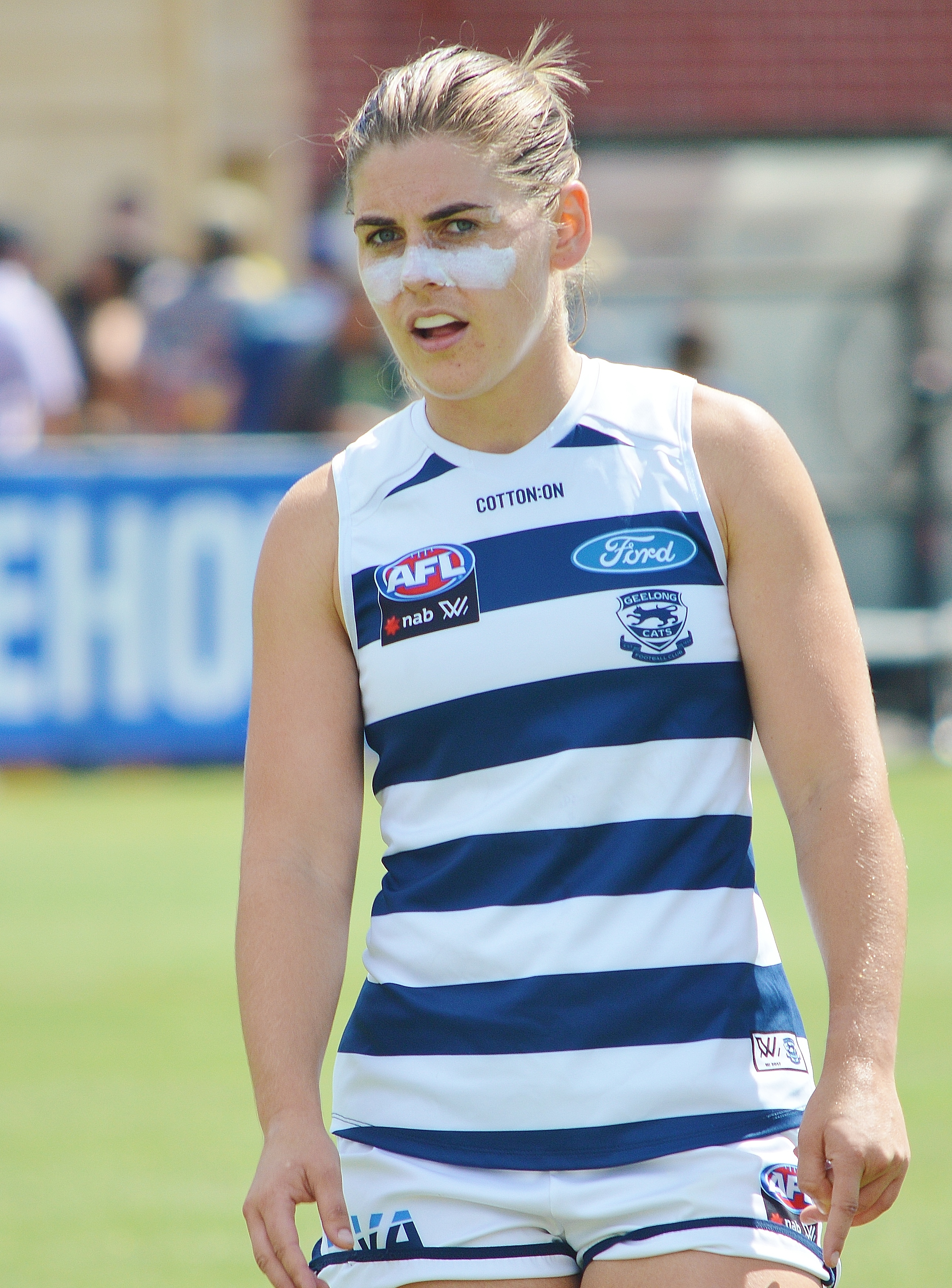
- Keryk with Geelong in February 2020

Personal information
- Born: 9 March 1995 (age 31)
- Original team: Melbourne University (VFL Women's)
- Draft: No. 115, 2016 AFL Women's draft
- Debut: Round 1, 2017, Carlton vs. Collingwood, at Ikon Park
- Height: 169 cm (5 ft 7 in)
- Position: Midfielder

Club information
- Current club: Port Adelaide
- Number: 26

Playing career^{1}
Years	Club	Games (Goals)
2017–2018	Carlton	8 (0)
2019–S7(2022)	Geelong	39 (0)
2023–2024	Port Adelaide	9 (3)
Total		56 (3)
- ^{1} Playing statistics correct to the end of the 2023 season.

Career highlights
- Carlton vice-captain: 2017

Madeline Keryk (born 9 March 1995) is an Australian rules footballer who played for Port Adelaide,Carlton and Geelong in the AFL Women's competition (AFLW). She was drafted by Carlton with the club's fifteenth selection and the one hundred and fifteenth overall in the 2016 AFL Women's draft. In 2017 AFL Women's Season and made her debut in round 1, the club and league's inaugural match at Ikon Park against Collingwood. She was delisted by Carlton at the end of the 2018 season. Keryk was redrafted by Geelong with the 62nd overall pick in the 2018 AFL Women's draft. In March 2023, Keryk was traded to Port Adelaide with pick #12 in exchange for Kate Surman.
