= Yeronga Football Club =

Australian rules football team of Queensland

Yeronga

Names
- Full name: Yeronga South Brisbane Football Club
- Former name(s): Yeronga Football Club (1928-1948), Yeronga National Football Club (1949-1950)
- Nickname: Devils

2018 season
- After finals: Premiers

Club details
- Founded: 1928; 98 years ago
- Colours
- Competition: QFA Div 1
- President: Chris Ryan
- Coach: Anthony Corrie
- Ground: Leyshon Park, Yeronga

Uniforms
Home

Other information
- Official website: yerongafc.com.au

The Yeronga South Brisbane Football Club, often known simply as Yeronga and nicknamed the Devils, is an Australian rules football club that plays in Division 2 of the Queensland Football Association (QFA) men's leagues and in the AFL Queensland Women's League (QAFLW). The club has previously competed in the Queensland Australian National Football League (QANFL).

== History ==
Yeronga Football Club was formed in 1928 and originally wore blue jumpers with a white vee. The club made two QANFL grand finals in the 1930s, losing to Windsor on both occasions.

=== Name change - Yeronga South Brisbane (1950) ===
In 1950, the club's board elected to change its name to South Brisbane to align itself with the South Brisbane District Cricket Club both of which shared the same field, Fehlberg Park, and president, Mr Will Sanders. It was decided to keep the Yeronga name but add South Brisbane to reflect its relationship with the cricket club. The new name remained despite later becoming detached from the cricket club, however was not popular and Yeronga Football Club continued to be used to refer to it.

Yeronga South Brisbane competed in various competitions, including the state league in 1945 and 1946, from 1949 to 1952, and in 1957 and 1960. The team wore jerseys from army disposals, playing in Footscray and Essendon colours at different times.

=== Coorparoo Merger and De-merger (1953-1954) ===
There was an additional merger with Coorparoo Football Club for the 1953 and 1954 seasons with the team competing under the name Coorparoo-Yeronga before separating.

The club was relegated from the QAFL's top division in 1960 and many senior players were lost to other clubs. The club fielded only junior teams for several years before returning to senior football in 1967.

=== Move to Leyshon Park (1972) ===
In 1972, Yeronga moved its headquarters to Leyshon Park. The foundations of the clubhouse had just been laid when they were washed away in the 1974 Brisbane flood. Cansdale Street, which leads to the ground, was named to honour the family of John Cansdale, who played for Yeronga from 1945 to 1969. The club was unable to use Leyshon Park during its centenary in 2010 because the ground was being transformed into the new centre of excellence for AFL Queensland which had co-located. Since the redevelopment, the ground has hosted many Grand Finals and matches involving the Brisbane Lions and Gold Coast Suns Academy teams.

Yeronga won its first senior flag in 2006 when coach Tom Corless led it to victory in the Division 1 Grand Final of the Queensland Football Association. The team successfully defended its premiership the following year defeating University of Queensland 11.11 (77) to 6.7 (43) in the Grand Final.

Yeronga South Brisbane entered the AFL Queensland Women's League in 2011. The team was immediately successful and won premierships in its first two years. From the Preliminary Final in 2011 to the Second Semi Final in 2013, Yeronga won 27 matches in a row before losing the 2013 Grand Final to Coorparoo. In addition to winning two more grand finals, ten players (as of the 2020 AFL Women's draft) have been drafted directly from Yeronga into the AFLW competition.

== Auslan Team Song ==
On 9 August 2020, a video of the women's Development League team singing the club song while signing it in Auslan for the benefit of player Jamie Howell, who is deaf, was uploaded to Instagram. The video went viral and was shared on social media by celebrities including Adam Hills and Dylan Alcott. Journalist Peter FitzSimons, writing in the Sydney Morning Herald, stated that "sports stories don't get a whole lot better than this". In 2021, Howell was named as the AFLW Premiership Cup Ambassador.

== Honours ==
=== Team ===
==== Men ====
- QANFL
  - Runners-up (2): 1932, 1937
- AFLQSA (Note: Australian Football League State Association")
  - Division One (2): 2006, 2007
  - Division Five (1): 2018

==== Women ====
- QAFLW
  - Winners (4): 2011, 2012, 2017, 2020
  - Runners-up (2): 2013, 2016

=== Individual ===
==== Men ====
Grogan Medalists (2)

- Fred Willets (1947 - tied)
- Bill Shorten (1951)

Top Goalkicker (3)

- Al Sanders (1948, 1949)
- Daryl Sanders (1954) (for Coorparoo-Yeronga)

==== Women ====
QAFLW Best and Fairest (6)

- Kate Lutkins (2013)
- Jordan Zanchetta (2015 - tied, 2020 - tied)
- Sam Virgo (2016 - tied)
- Kate McCarthy (2017)
- Emily Bates (2019)

Leading Goalkicker (5)

- Caitlin Collins (2012)
- Hayley Newberry (2015)
- Jade Ransfield (2016 - tied, 2017 - tied)
- Lexi Edwards (2020 - tied)

Grand Final Best on Ground (5)

- Kate Lutkins (2011)
- Emily Bates (2012, 2017)
- Jordan Zanchetta (2013, 2020)

== Notable players ==
=== Men ===
- Mabior Chol
- Matt Eagles
- Harry Pegg
- Al Sanders
- Daryl Sanders
- Leyland Sanders
- Cyril Smith

=== Women ===
- Lauren Arnell
- Emily Bates
- Katie Brennan
- Sabrina Frederick
- Dee Heslop
- Jessy Keeffe
- Delissa Kimmince
- Kate Lutkins
- Kate McCarthy
- Jade Pregelj
- Sam Virgo
- Jacqui Yorston
- Jordan Zanchetta
