= Aasta O'Connor =

Australian rules footballer

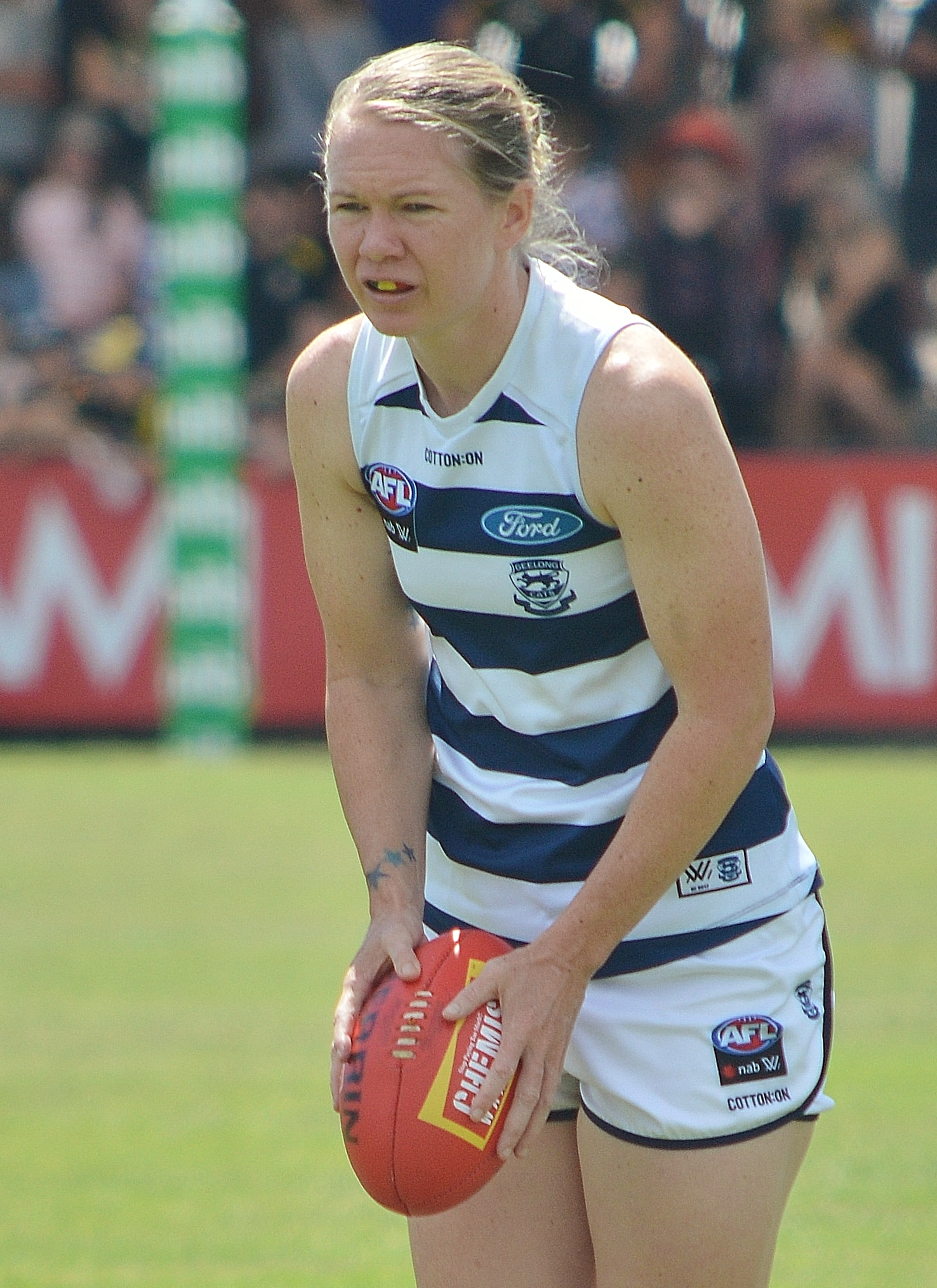
- O'Connor with Geelong in February 2020

Personal information
- Born: 21 June 1987 (age 39); Brisbane
- Original team: Darebin Falcons (VWFL)
- Draft: No. 12, 2016 AFL Women's draft
- Debut: Round 1, 2017, Western Bulldogs vs. Fremantle, at VU Whitten Oval
- Height: 182 cm (6 ft 0 in)
- Position: Ruck

Playing career^{1}
Years	Club	Games (Goals)
2017–2018	Western Bulldogs	12 (3)
2019–2021	Geelong	20 (1)
Total		32 (4)
- ^{1} Playing statistics correct to the end of the 2021 season.

Aasta O'Connor (born 21 June 1987) is a retired Australian rules footballer who played as a ruck for Western Bulldogs and for Geelong in the AFL Women's competition. She is also a member of the Darebin Falcons' VFL Women's team.

== Early life ==
O'Connor was born in Brisbane and raised on the Sunshine Coast, Queensland. She attended Immanuel Lutheran College throughout her upbringing and began playing football for the Northshore Jets under 10s mixed team in the local Sunshine Coast junior league. At the age of 18, O'Connor moved to Brisbane and began playing top level QAFLW football for the Logan Cobras. Her stint with Logan included four premierships, five Queensland state representative appearances and three All-Australian honours. In 2010, she decided to relocate to Victoria and began playing for the Darebin Falcons in the VFLW. Her time with Darebin included a further four premierships and state representative honours for Victoria.

== Achievements ==
O'Connor is a four time premiership player with the Darebin Falcons, four time premiership player with Logan Cobras FC (QLD), Lisa Hardman medallist, 2 time Cath Wotton medallist, Vic rep at the first female AFL AIS squad in 2011. She was also the twelfth draft pick for the AFLW, but was limited to four games in the 2017 season due to a knee injury.

The Western Bulldogs signed O'Connor for the 2018 season during the trade period in May 2017.

In May 2018, O'Connor accepted an offer from expansion club Geelong to play with the club in the 2019 AFL Women's season. In March 2021, O'Connor announced her retirement.

Since 2022, O'Connor has been an assistant coach of the Carlton Football Club's AFL Women's team; and since 2025, she has also been senior coach of the club's VFL Women's team.

== Personal life ==
Off the field, O'Connor is manager and coach at the AFL Women's Academy and lives in Abbotsford, Victoria with her partner, fellow AFLW player Kate Tyndall.

== Statistics ==
Statistics are correct to the end of the 2018 season

Legend
G	Goals	K	Kicks	D	Disposals	T	Tackles
B	Behinds	H	Handballs	M	Marks	H/O	Hit-outs

Season	Team	No.	Games	Totals								Averages (per game)							
Season	Team	No.	Games	G	B	K	H	D	M	T	H/O	G	B	K	H	D	M	T	H/O
2017	Western Bulldogs	4	4	1	0	9	14	23	4	6	24	0.3	0.0	2.3	3.5	5.8	1.0	1.5	6.0
2018	Western Bulldogs	4	8	2	0	40	23	63	21	16	82	0.3	0.0	5.0	2.9	7.9	2.6	2.0	10.3
Career			12	3	0	49	37	86	25	22	106	0.3	0.0	4.1	3.1	7.2	2.1	1.8	8.8
