= Eastern Devils =

Australian rules football club

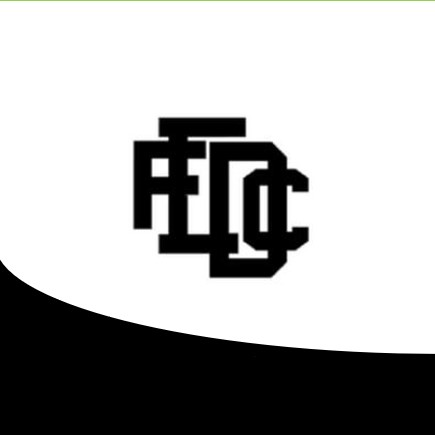

Names
- Full name: Eastern Devils Football Club
- Nickname(s): Devils

Club details
- Founded: 1999 (as Deakin Devils)
- Colours: White Black
- Premierships: SEWF Div 1 (2): 2017; 2018; VWFL Premier Reserves (1): 2008

Other information
- Official website: easterndevils.com

The Eastern Devils Football Club is a women's Australian rules football club based in Wheelers Hill, Victoria that currently competes in the Eastern Football Netball League.

== History ==
The club was formed in 1999 as the Deakin Devils Women's Football Club, competing in the Victorian Women's Football League (VWFL) as a representative of Deakin University. The club continued in this guise until 2008, when it cut ties with the university and shifted its premises to Burwood East, aligning with the East Burwood Football Club to become the East Burwood Devils. In 2012, the club changed its name to the Eastern Devils, and again moved location a year later to Mulgrave Reserve in Wheelers Hill.

In 2016, the Devils were an inaugural competitor in the VFL Women's (VFLW) competition, having taken part in the Premier Division of the final VWFL season in 2015. After finishing fourth and seventh respectively in their first two VFLW seasons, the Devils departed the statewide competition to instead field multiple teams in the South Eastern Women's Football competition from 2018 onwards.

In 2022, the club transferred to the Eastern Football Netball League, where they have since remained.
