= Diamond Creek Football Club =

Names
- Full name: Diamond Creek Football Club
- Nickname(s): The Creekers, Demons, Creek, Diamo
- After finals: 4th

Club details
- Founded: 1904
- Colours: Navy and Red
- Competition: Northern Football League
- Coach: Brian Hardman
- Captain(s): Simon Buchan
- Ground(s): Coventry Oval

Other information
- Official website: diamondcreekfc.com.au

The Diamond Creek Football Club is an Australian rules football club located in Diamond Creek – an outer north-eastern suburb of Melbourne.

== History ==
Formed in 1904, the club was a founding member of the Whittlesea District Football Association. A move to the Bourke-Evelyn Football League in 1906 was very successful with premierships in 1906 and 1908 and being runners-up in 1907 and 1912.

Nevertheless, Diamond Creek moved to the Heidelberg District Football League after World War I and, in 1922 joined Eltham, Greensborough, Kangaroo Ground, Templestowe and Warrandyte as founding members of the Diamond Valley Football League.

The club plays in the Northern Football League, fielding 3 senior and 8 junior teams with a netball team in the Northern Football League Netball Comp. To go with this, they also field a Super Rules team for over 35s.

== AFL/VFL players ==
Diamond Creek Football Club has launched the careers of many AFL players, including:

- Gordon Coventry – former champion Collingwood full forward
- Syd Coventry – former Collingwood premiership captain and Brownlow Medallist
- Rhyce Shaw – former Collingwood and Sydney player; former North Melbourne coach
- Heath Shaw – former Collingwood and Greater Western Sydney player
- Jack Anthony – former Collingwood and Fremantle player

== Women's team ==
Diamond Creek had an affiliate women's team formed in 2002 with one team that expanded to two sides in 2007 (seniors and reserves) competing in the Victorian Women's Football League.

The Diamond Creek Women's Football Club affiliated as its own sporting body in 2009, officially separating from the Diamond Creek Football Club, and now plays out of Plenty Memorial Park.
