= Hampson–Hardeman Cup =

- Latest meeting: 16 August 2025
- Next meeting: Saturday 24 October, 2026

Statistics
- Total meetings: 15
- All-time series: Melbourne 11 wins Western Bulldogs 4 wins
- Largest victory: Melbourne – 64 points (9 October 2022); Western Bulldogs – 39 points (3 September 2016)

Prior to the creation of the AFL Women's (AFLW), the AFL ran four years of exhibition matches between sides representing Melbourne and Western Bulldogs: the winner received the Hampson–Hardeman Cup, named in honour of women's football pioneers Barb Hampson and Lisa Hardeman, who developed the first women's championships in 1992.

The cup is currently held by Melbourne.

== History ==
	2013
Sunday, 30 June	Melbourne 8.5 (53)	def.	Western Bulldogs 3.3 (21)	MCG (crowd: 7,518)	Match report
Melbourne received the Hampson–Hardeman Cup

	2014
Sunday, 29 June	Western Bulldogs 4.2 (26)	def. by	Melbourne 10.12 (72)	Etihad Stadium (crowd: 24,953 (D/H))	Match report
Melbourne retained the Hampson–Hardeman Cup

	2015
Sunday, 24 May	Melbourne 4.13 (37)	def.	Western Bulldogs 4.5 (29)	MCG (crowd: 29,381 (D/H))	Match report
Sunday, 16 August	Western Bulldogs 5.6 (36)	def. by	Melbourne 6.4 (40)	Etihad Stadium (crowd: 27,805 (D/H))	Match report
Melbourne retained the Hampson–Hardeman Cup; Both matches aired live on Channel 7 (7mate in northern states) as part of their AFL coverage

	2016
Sunday, 6 March	Melbourne 3.3 (21)	def. by	Western Bulldogs 6.5 (41)	Highgate Recreational Reserve	Match report
Saturday, 3 September	Western Bulldogs 14.6 (90)	def.	Melbourne 7.9 (51)	Whitten Oval (crowd: 6,365)	Match report
Western Bulldogs received the Hampson–Hardeman Cup

	2017
Saturday, 18 February (7:35 pm)	Western Bulldogs 4.5 (29)	def. by	Melbourne 6.7 (43)	VU Whitten Oval (crowd: 8,000)	Report
Melbourne received the Hampson–Hardeman Cup; This was the first match between the two teams in the newly-formed AFLW

	2018
Saturday, 17 March (7:10 pm)	Western Bulldogs 5.3 (33)	def.	Melbourne 4.7 (31)	VU Whitten Oval (crowd: 7,593)	Report
Western Bulldogs received the Hampson–Hardeman Cup

	2019
Saturday, 9 March (7:15 pm)	Western Bulldogs 6.2 (38)	def. by	Melbourne 5.9 (39)	Marvel Stadium (crowd: 10,612)	Report
Melbourne received the Hampson–Hardeman Cup

	2020
Friday, 14 February (7:40 pm)	Western Bulldogs 2.0 (12)	def. by	Melbourne 4.8 (32)	VU Whitten Oval (crowd: 3,133)	Report
Melbourne retain the Hampson–Hardeman Cup

	2021
Sunday, 21 February (3:10 pm)	Western Bulldogs 6.1 (37)	def.	Melbourne 2.12 (24)	VU Whitten Oval (crowd: 3,180)	Report
Western Bulldogs received the Hampson–Hardeman Cup

	2022 (S6)
Saturday, 8 January (7:00 pm)	Western Bulldogs 3.4 (22)	def. by	Melbourne 6.10 (46)	Victoria University Whitten Oval (crowd: 2,571)	Report
Melbourne received the Hampson–Hardeman Cup

	2022 (S7)
Sunday, 9 October (3:10 pm)	Melbourne 10.13 (73)	def.	Western Bulldogs 1.3 (9)	Casey Fields (crowd: 2,154)	Report; Stats
Melbourne retain the Hampson–Hardeman Cup

	2023
Saturday, 16 September (3:05 pm)	Melbourne 12.11 (83)	def.	Western Bulldogs 6.5 (41)	Casey Fields (crowd: 1,457)	Report; Stats
Melbourne retain the Hampson–Hardeman Cup

	2025
Saturday, 16 August (7:35 pm)	Western Bulldogs 1.8 (14)	def. by	Melbourne 9.8 (62)	Mission Whitten Oval (crowd: 3,278)	Report; Stats
Melbourne retain the Hampson–Hardeman Cup

== See also ==
- AFL Women's
- AFL Women's National Championships
