= List of VFL/AFL and AFL Women's players from Western Australia =

This is a list of players from Western Australia to have played in the Australian Football League (AFL) and the AFL Women's (AFLW), the two pre-eminent competitions of Australian rules football.

Note that prior to the full professionalism of the game and the expansion of the Victorian competition nationally during the 1980s, most top level Western Australians played in the state-based WAFL competition and represented Western Australia in interstate matches.

== List of players ==
=== Men's ===
==== Current Players ====
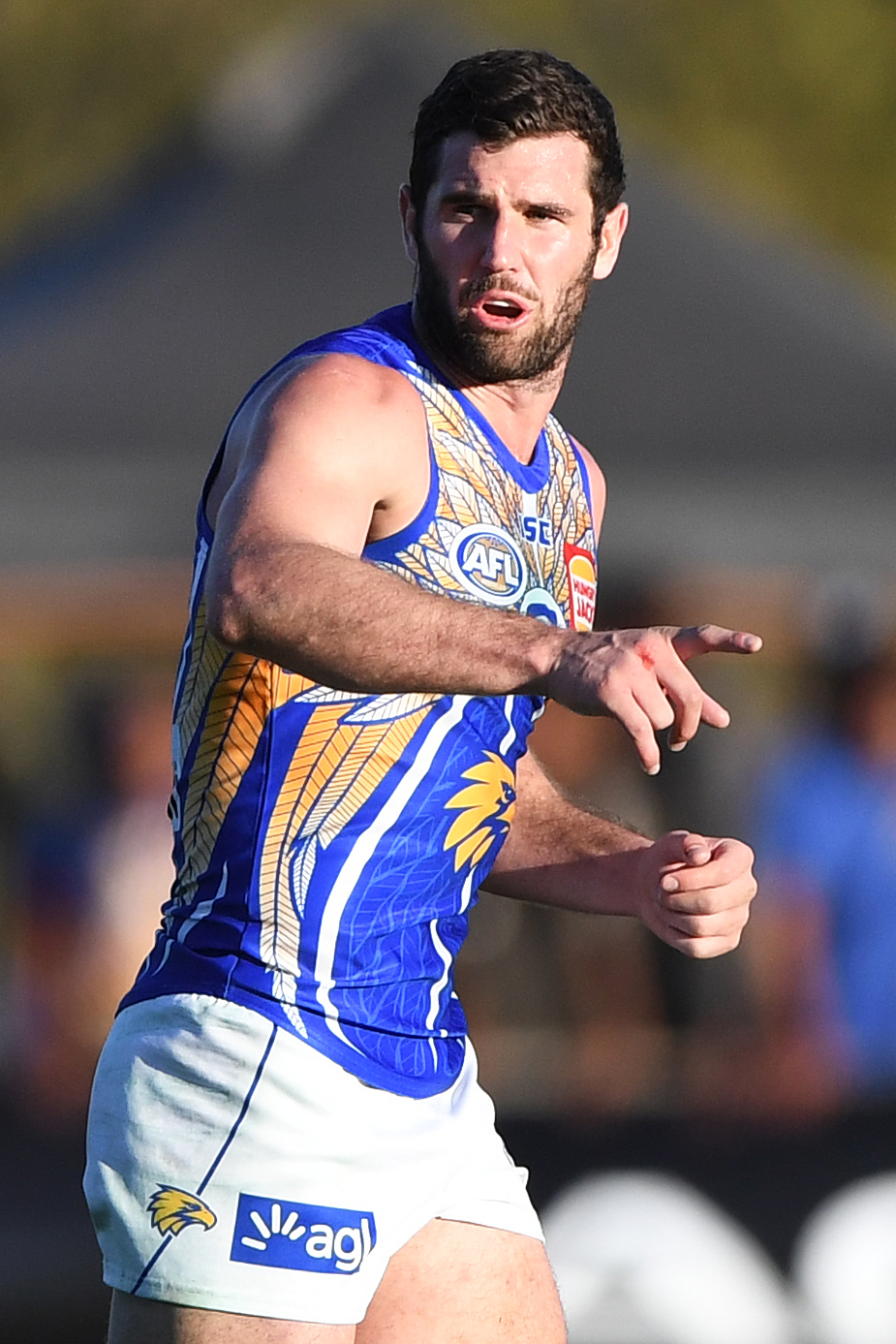
Jack Darling is from Perth

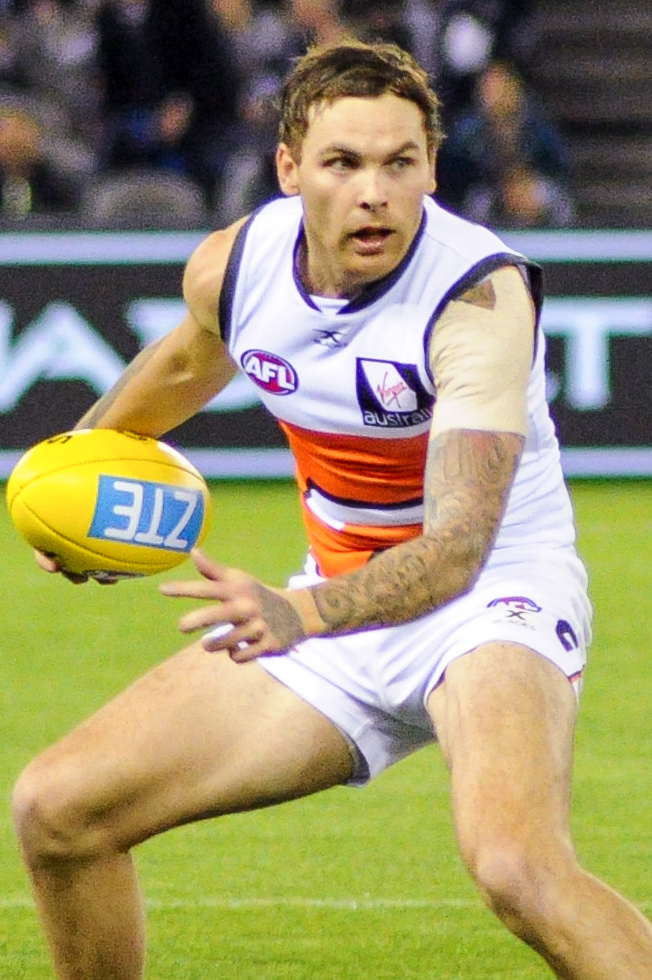
Nathan Wilson is from Mandurah

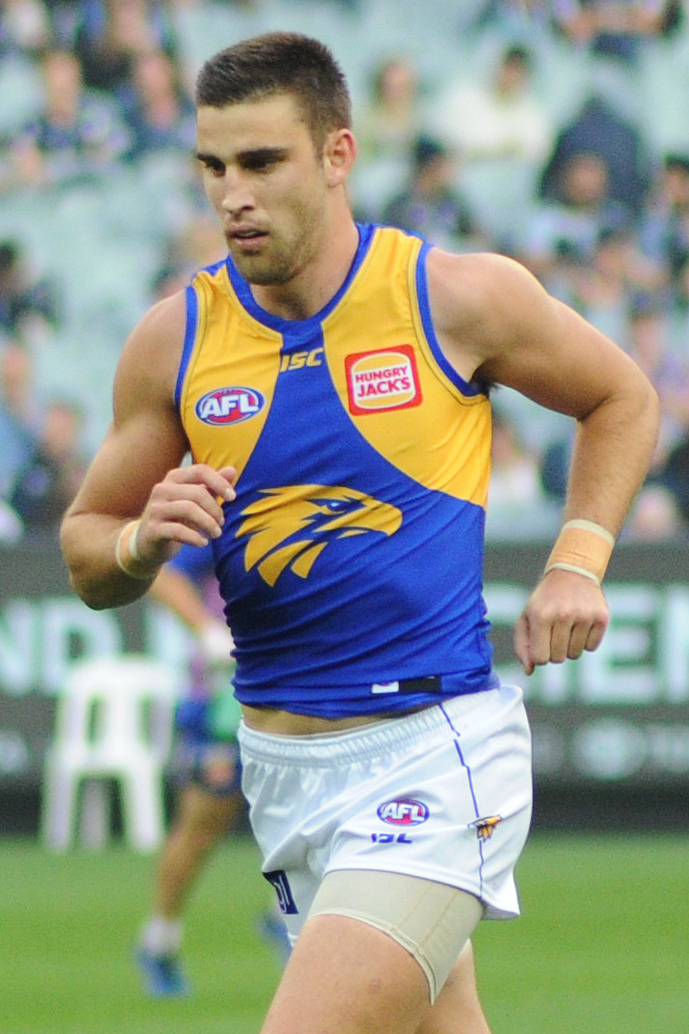
Elliot Yeo is from Perth

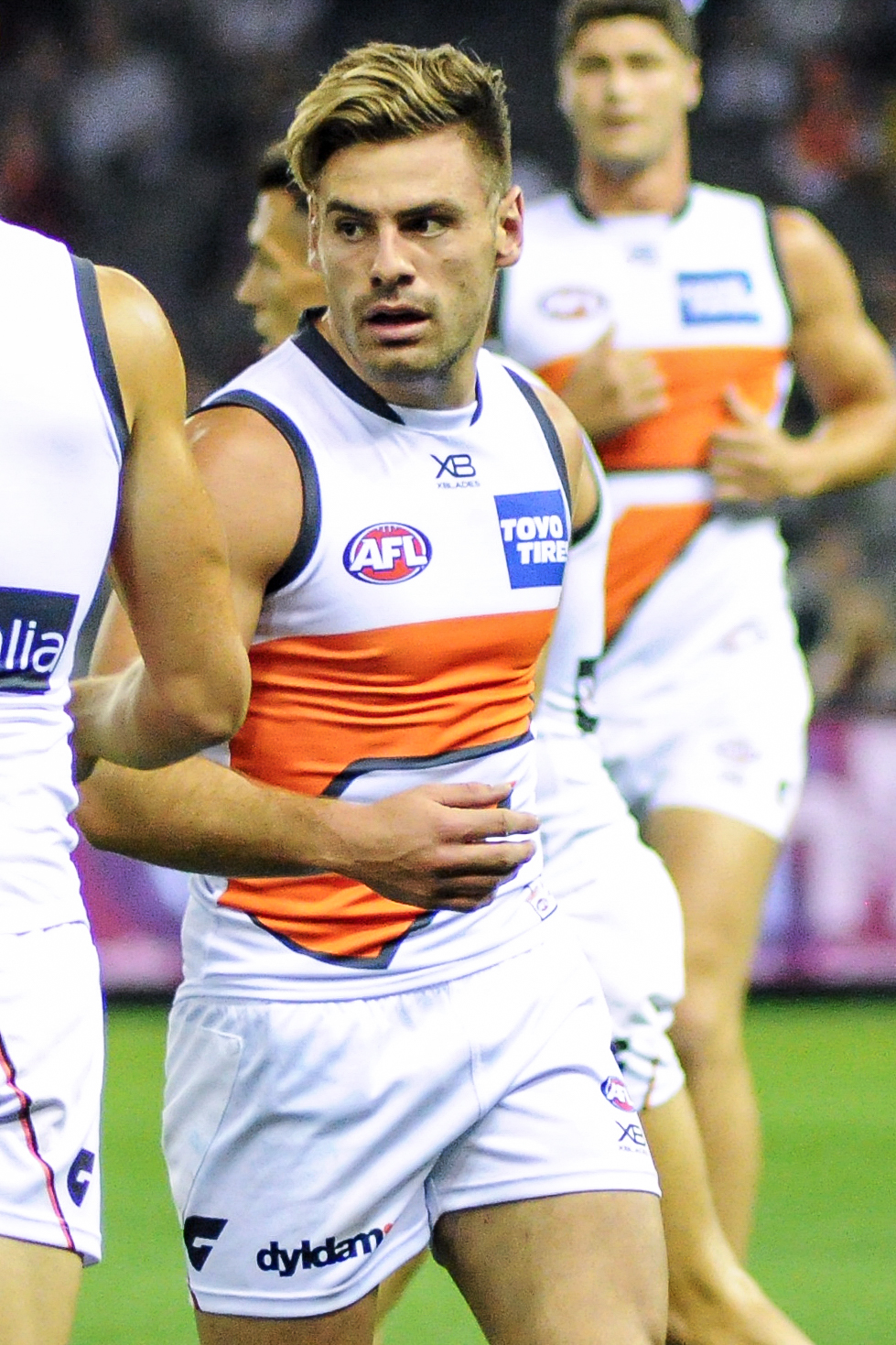
Stephen Coniglio is from Joondalup

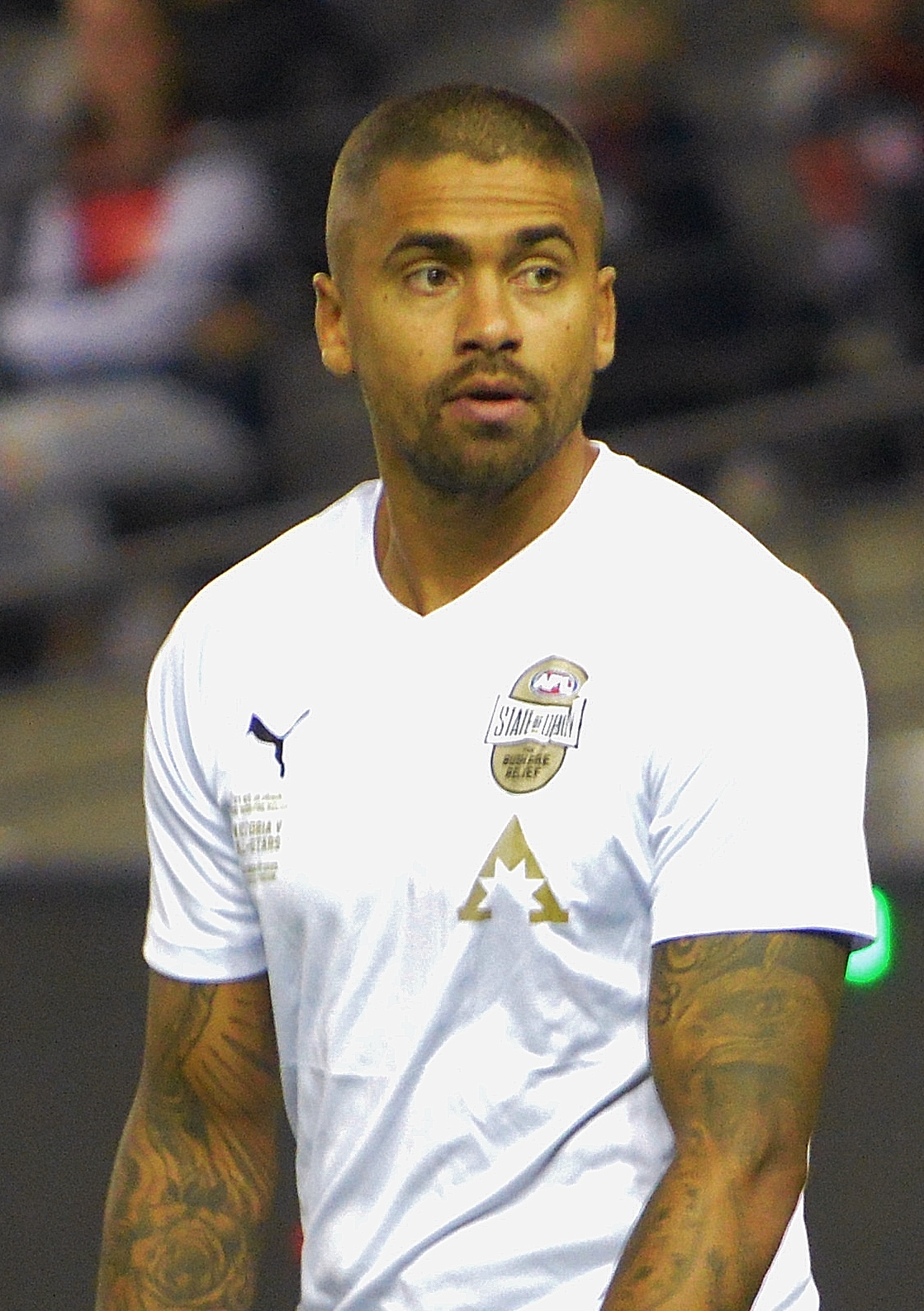
Bradley Hill is from Perth

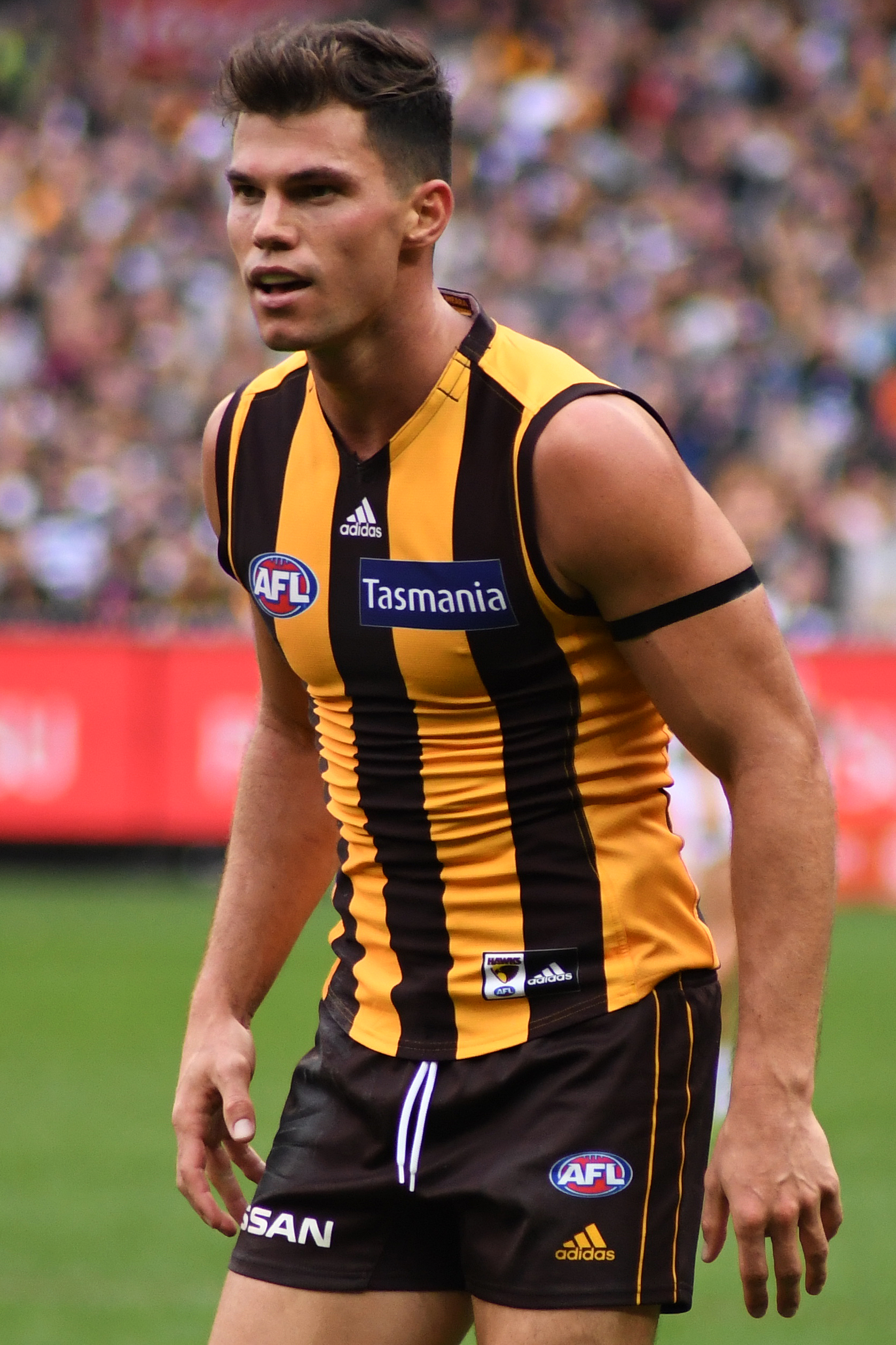
Jaeger O'Meara is from Dongara

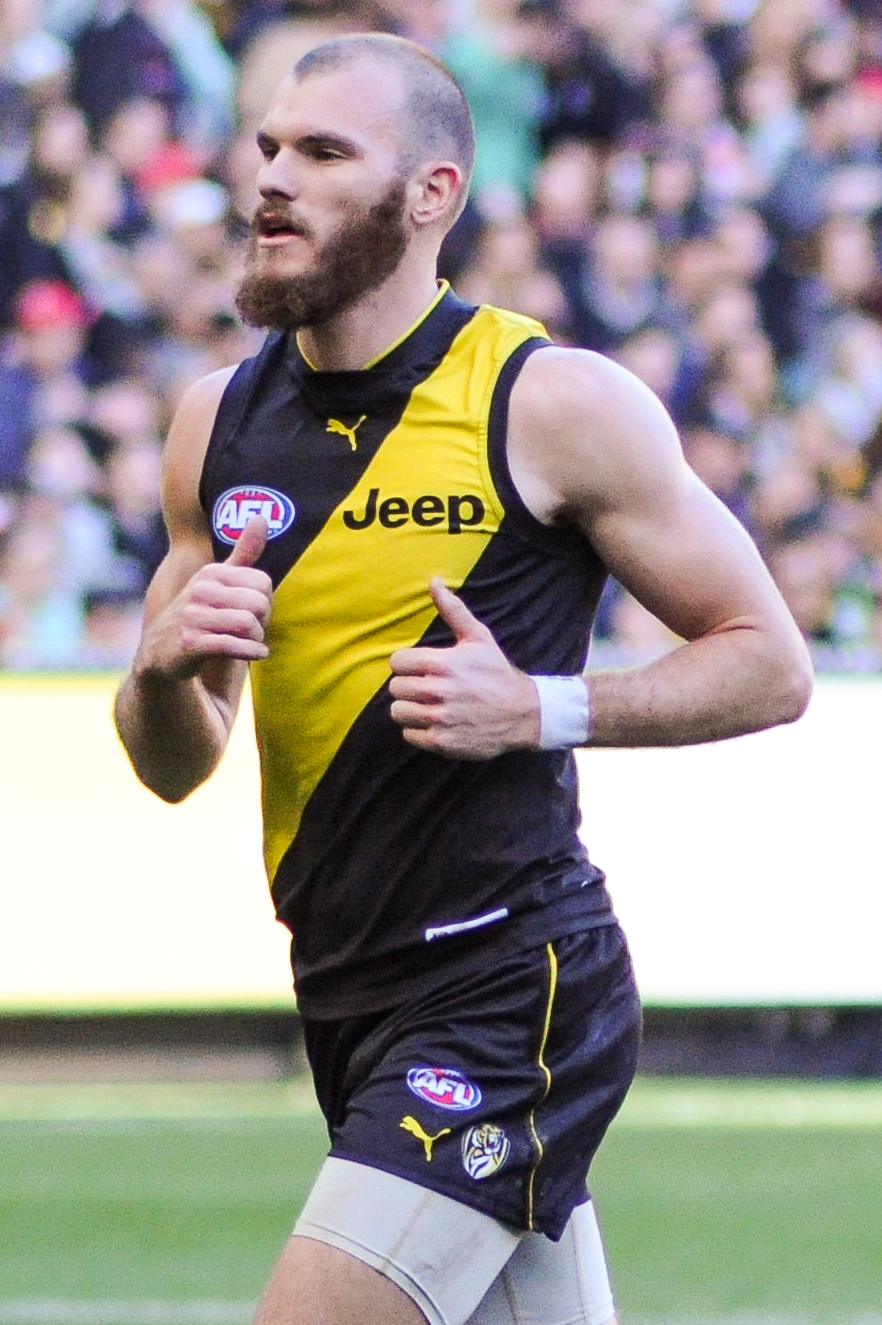
Kamdyn McIntosh is from Pinjarra

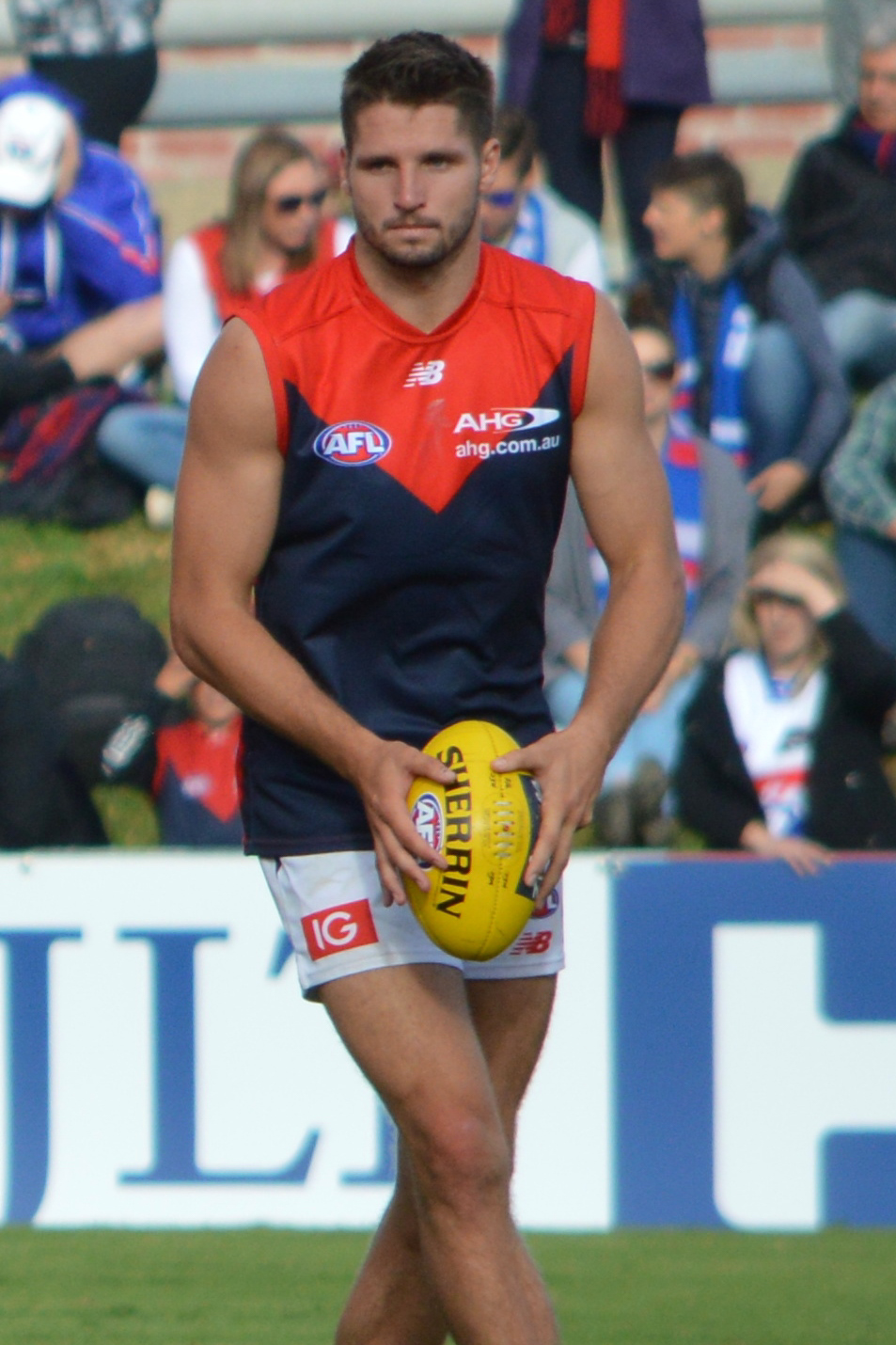
Jesse Hogan is from Perth

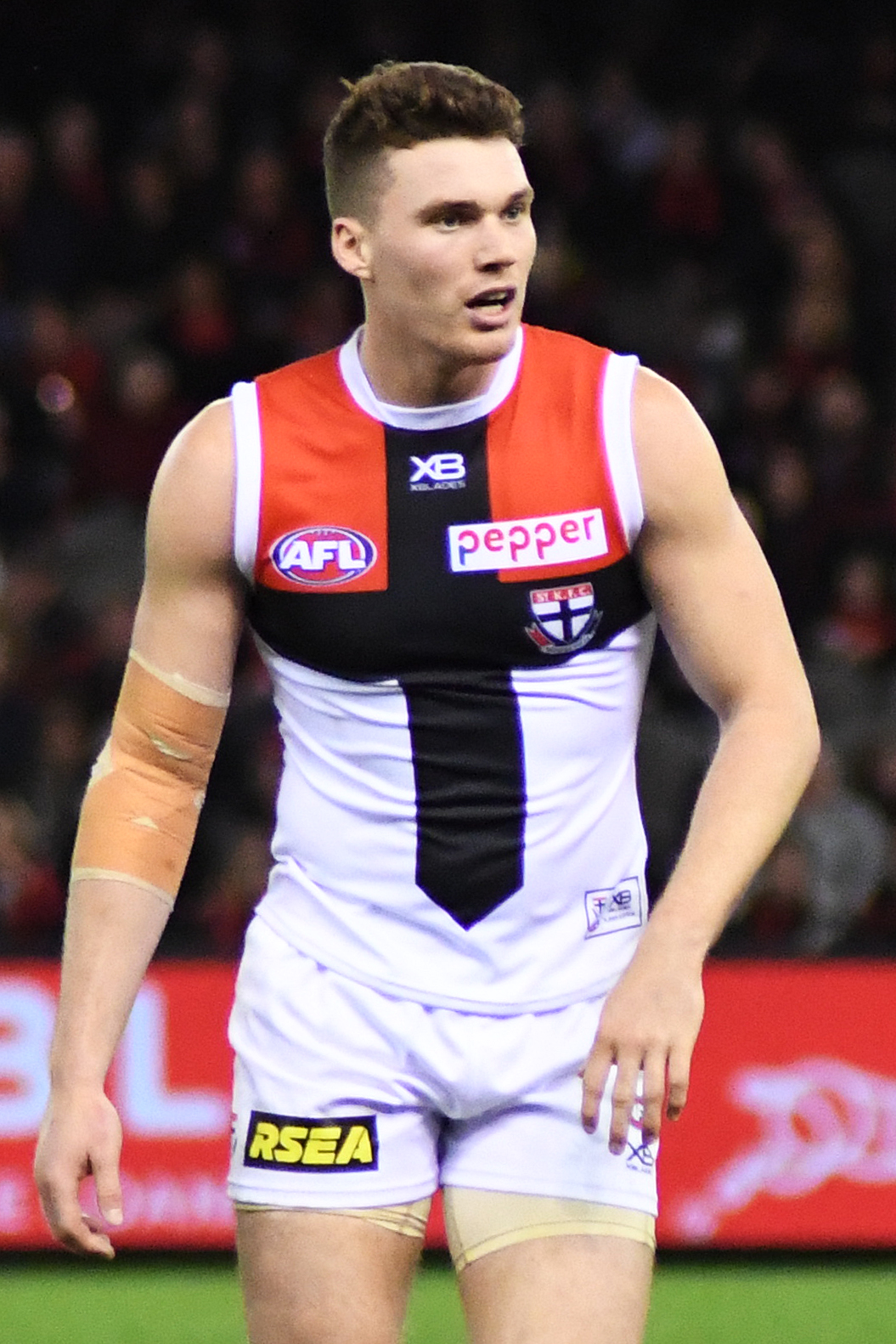
Blake Acres is from Joondalup

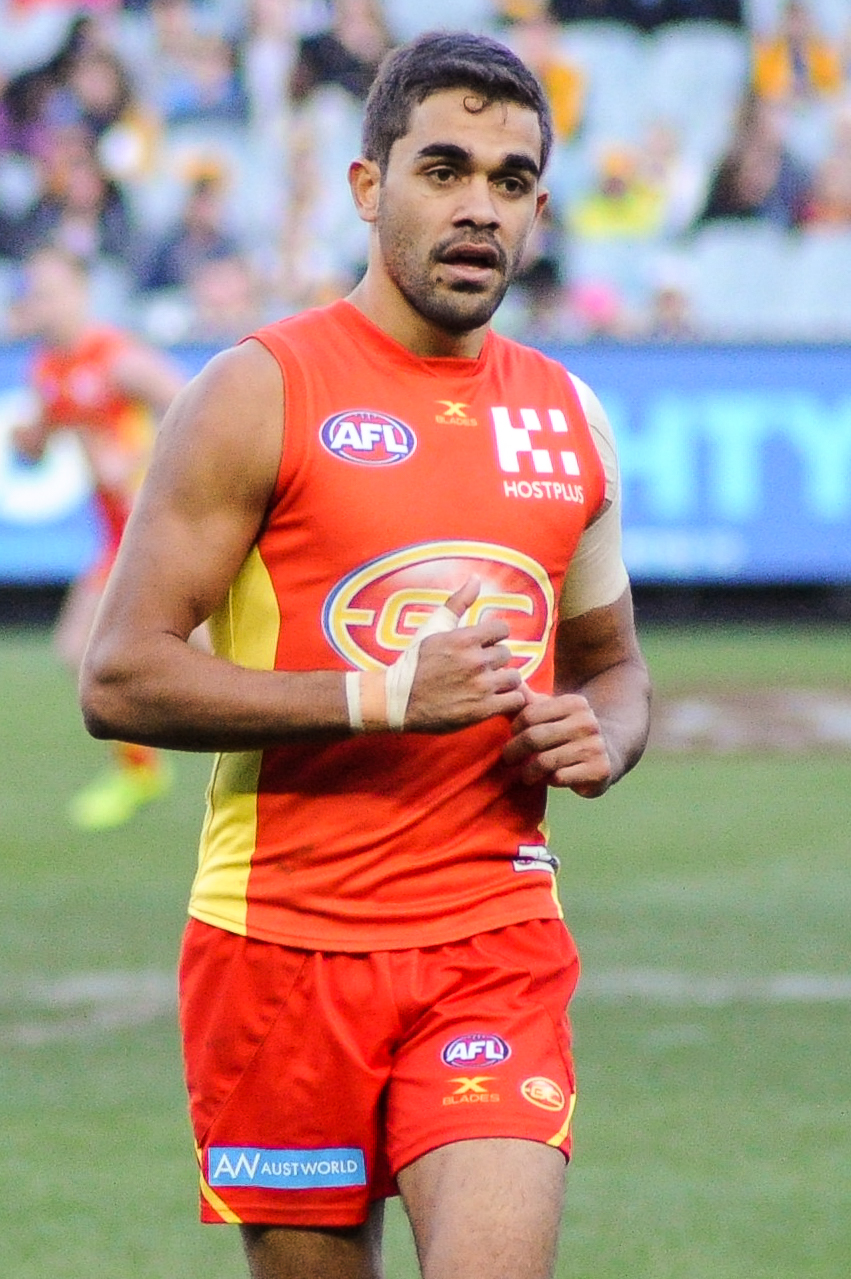
Jack Martin is from Broome and Geraldton

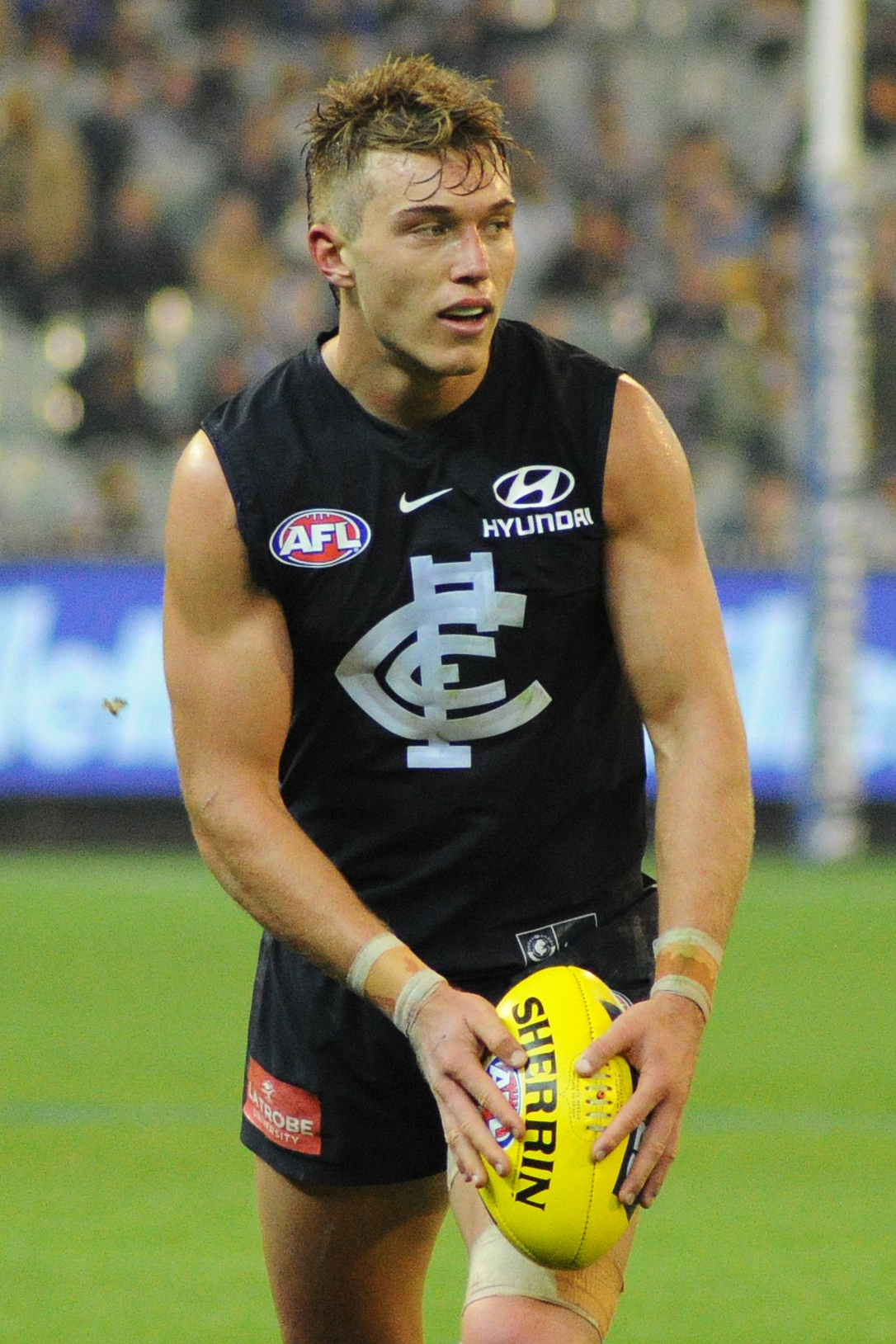
Patrick Cripps, Brownlow medallist, is from Perth

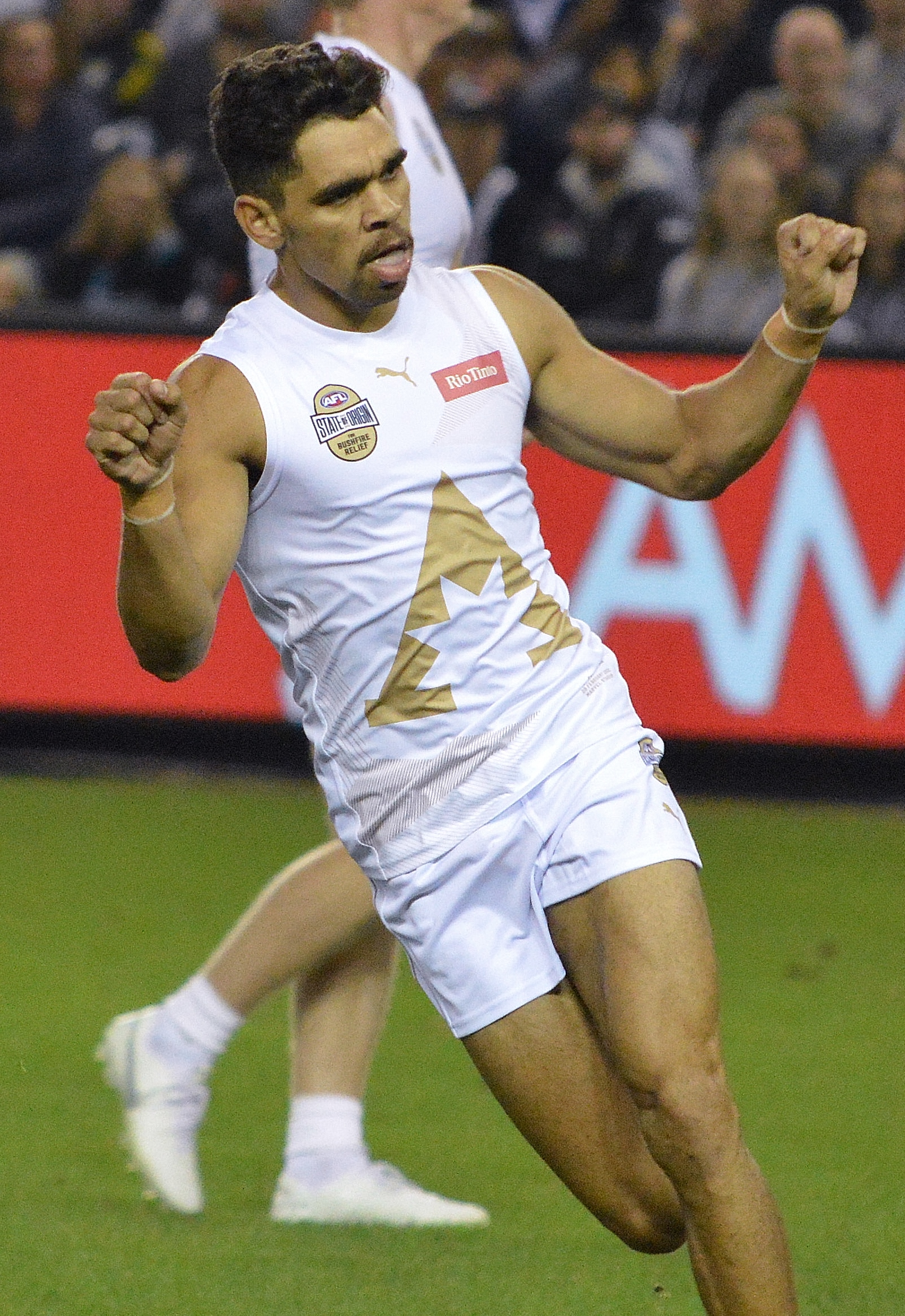
Charlie Cameron is from Newman

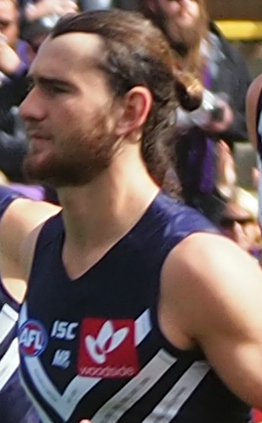
Connor Blakely is from Bunbury

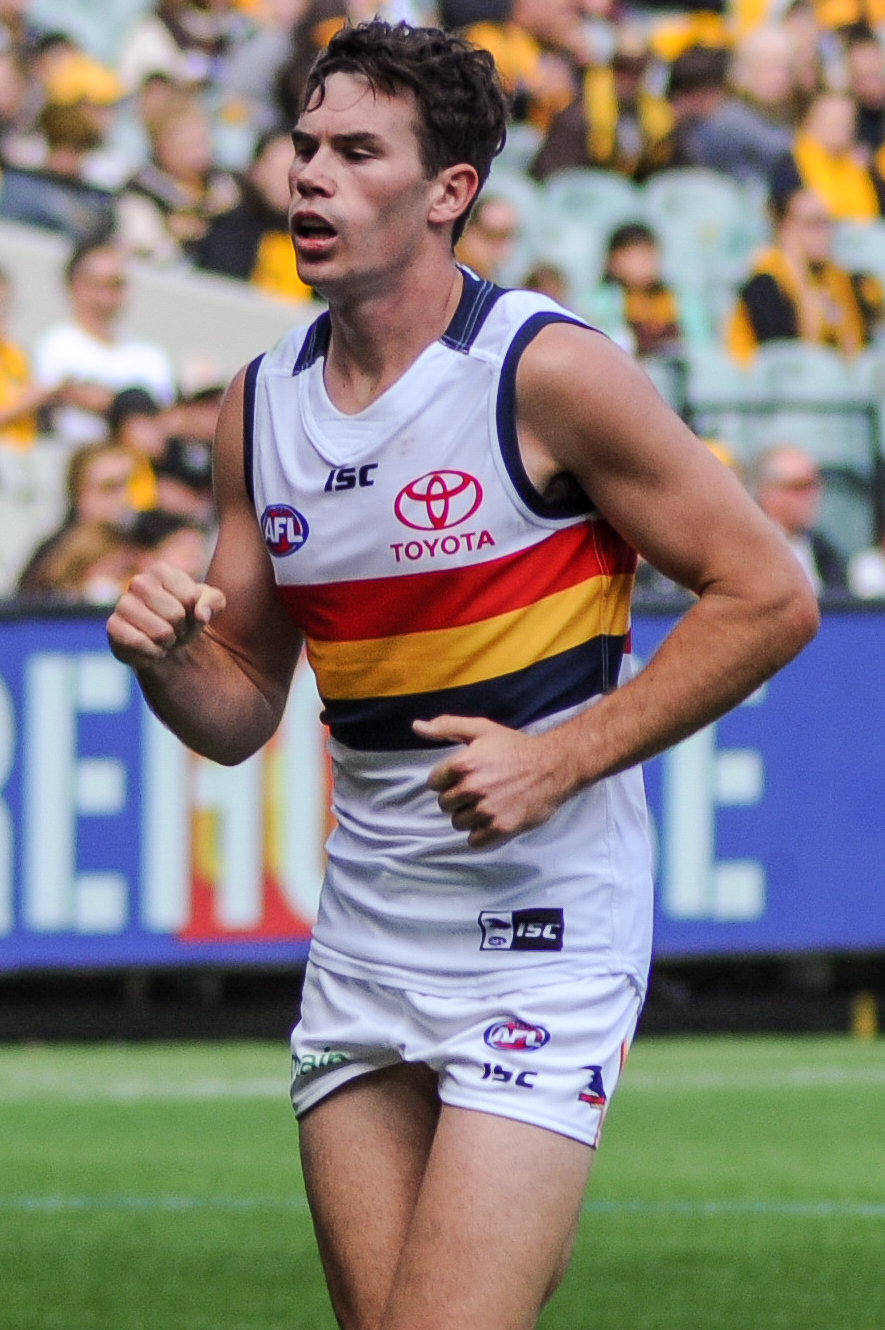
Mitch McGovern is from Albany

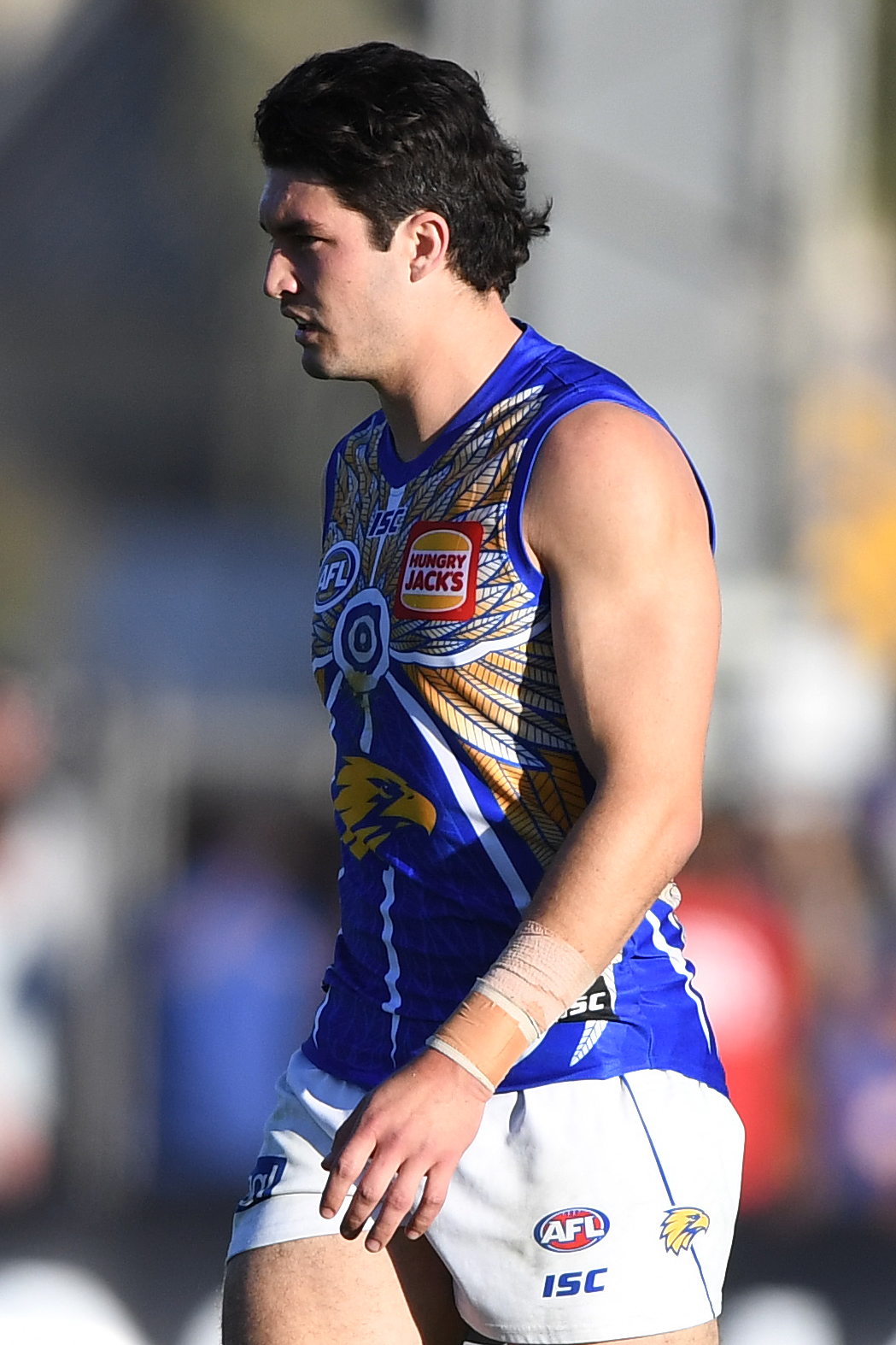
Tom Barrass is from Perth

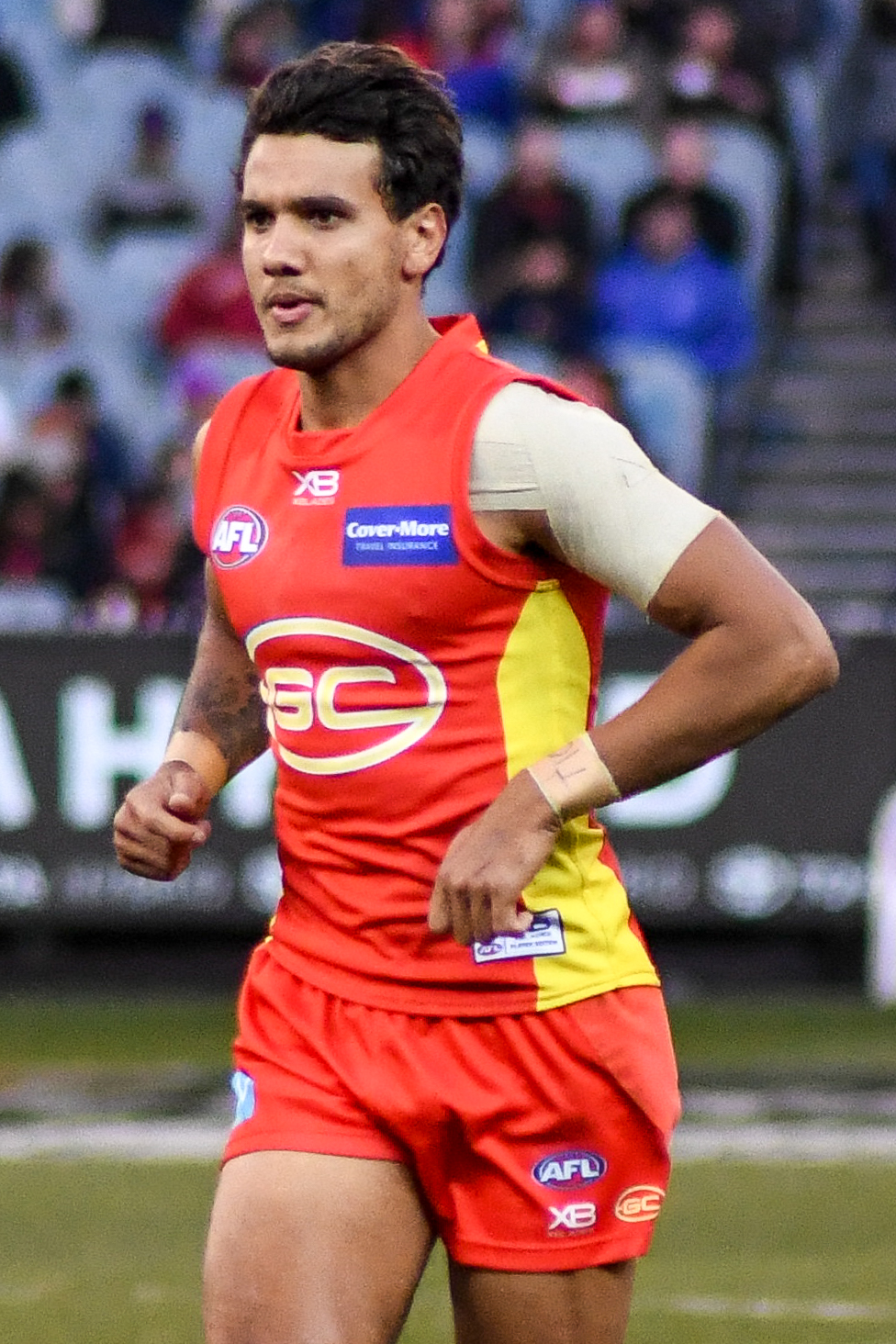
Callum Ah Chee is from Derby

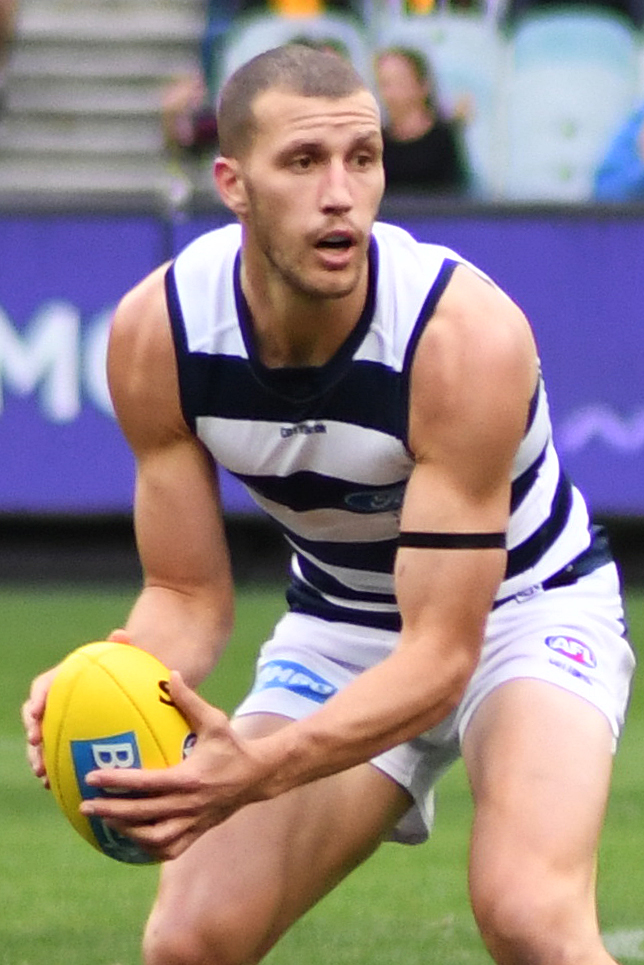
Sam Menegola is from Perth

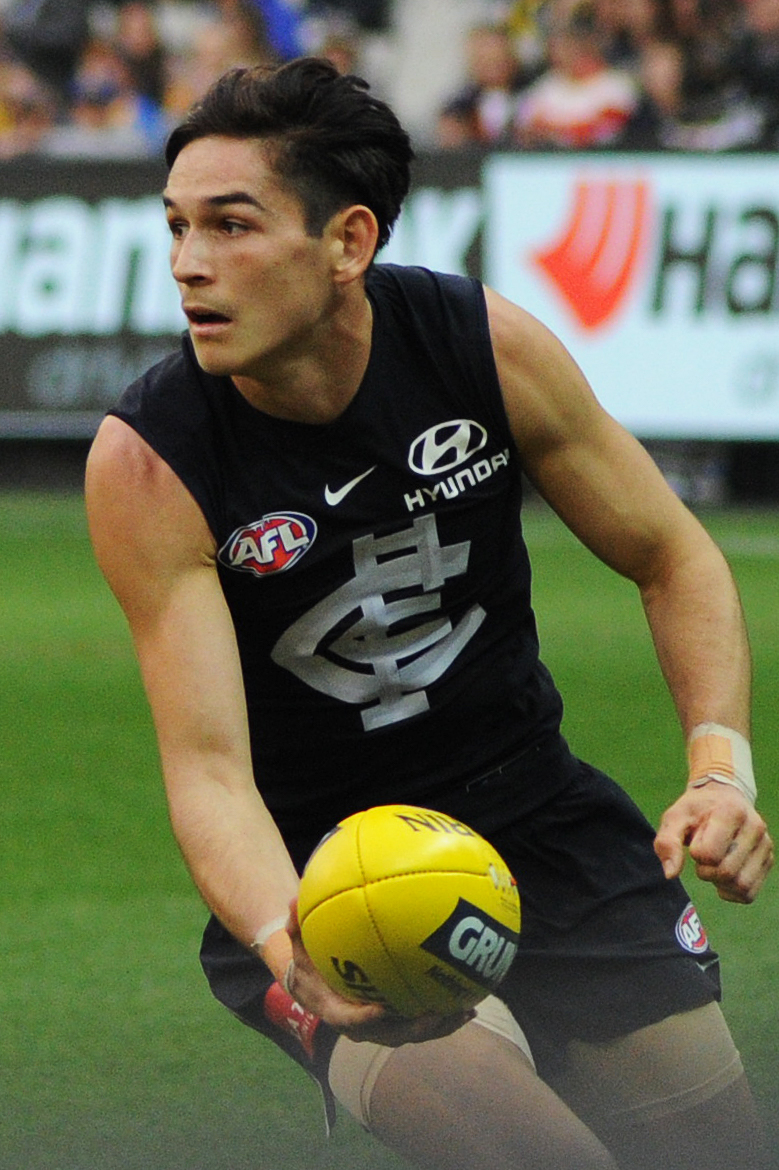
Zac Fisher is from York

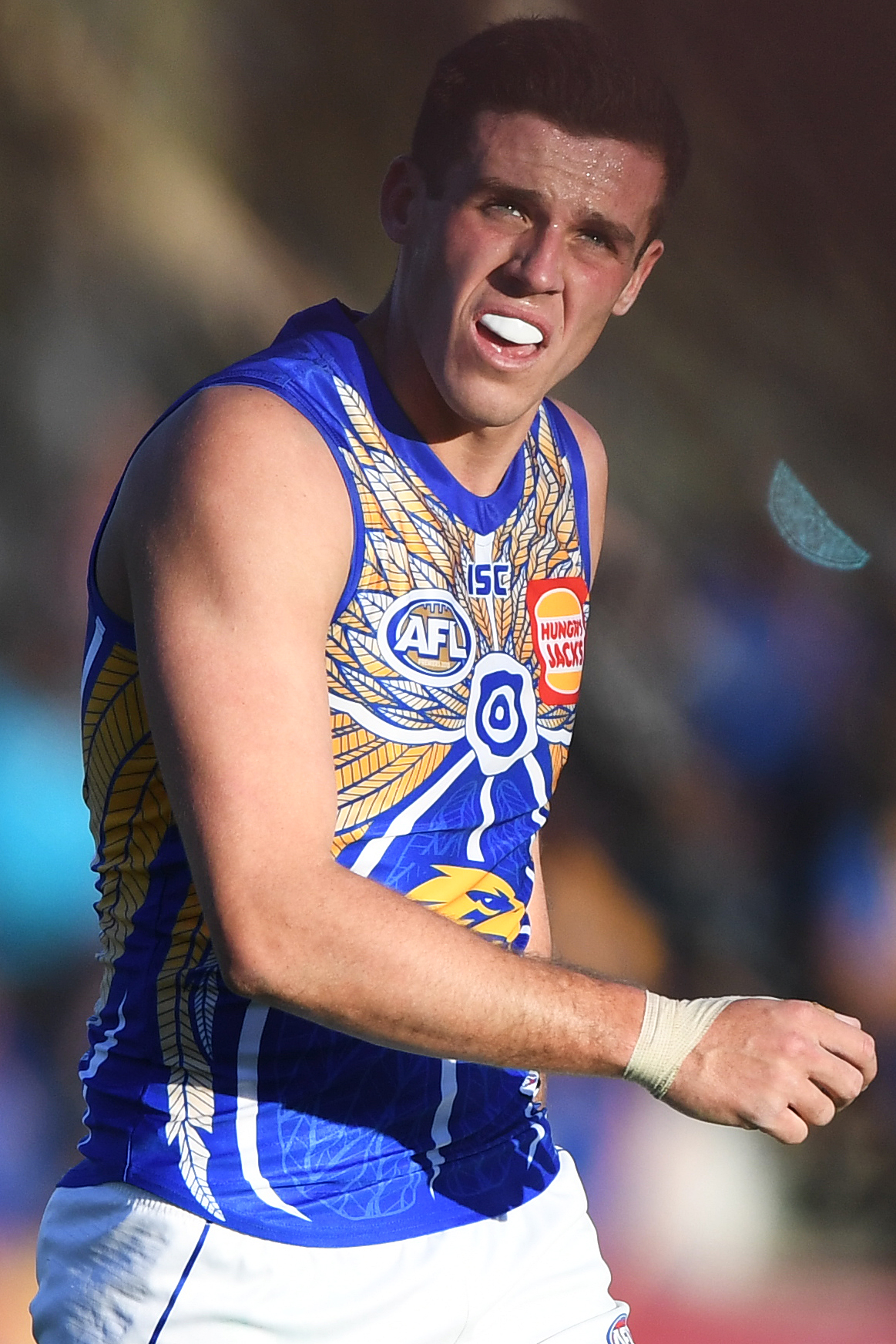
Jake Waterman is from Perth

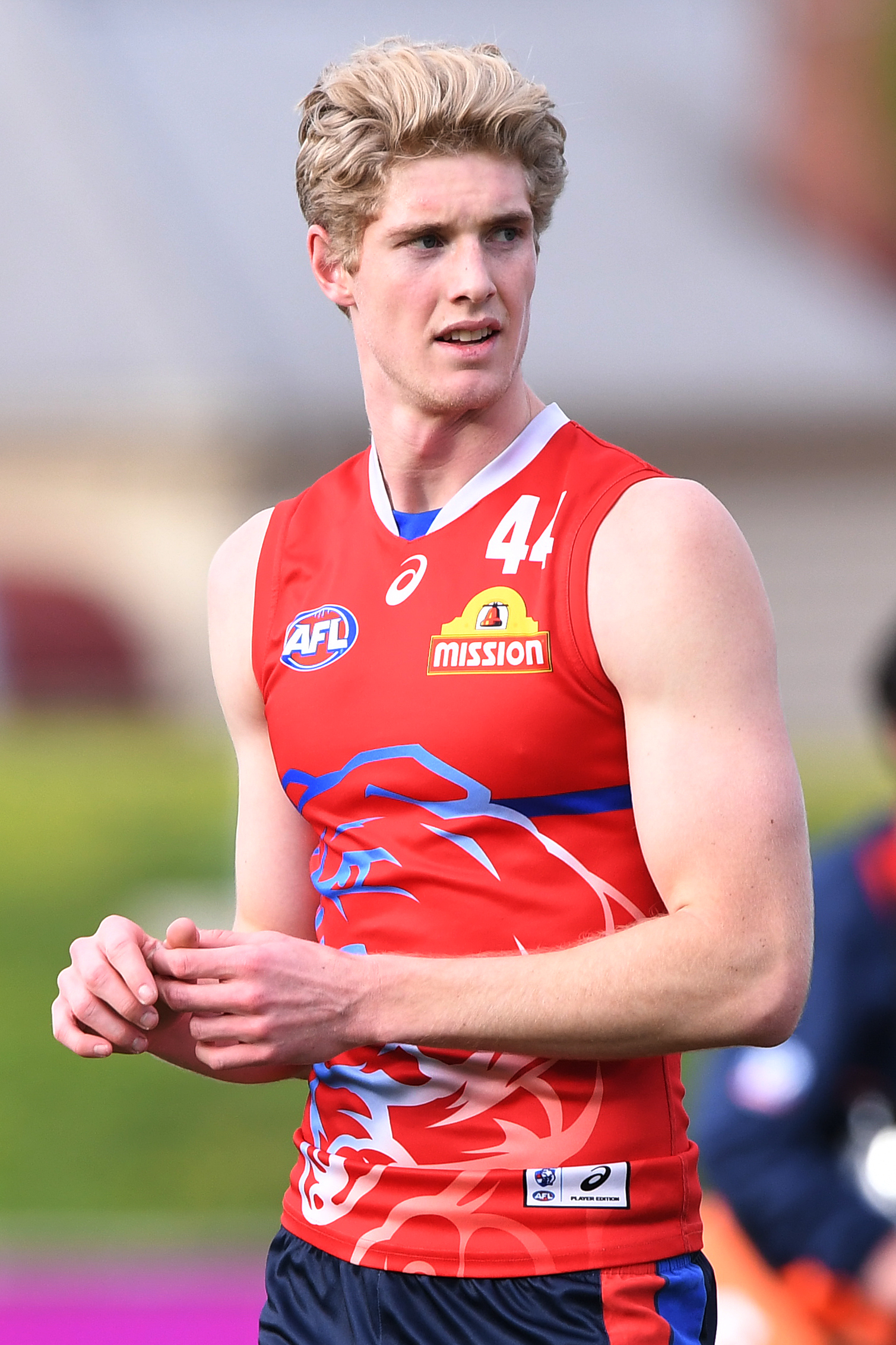
Tim English is from Dunsborough

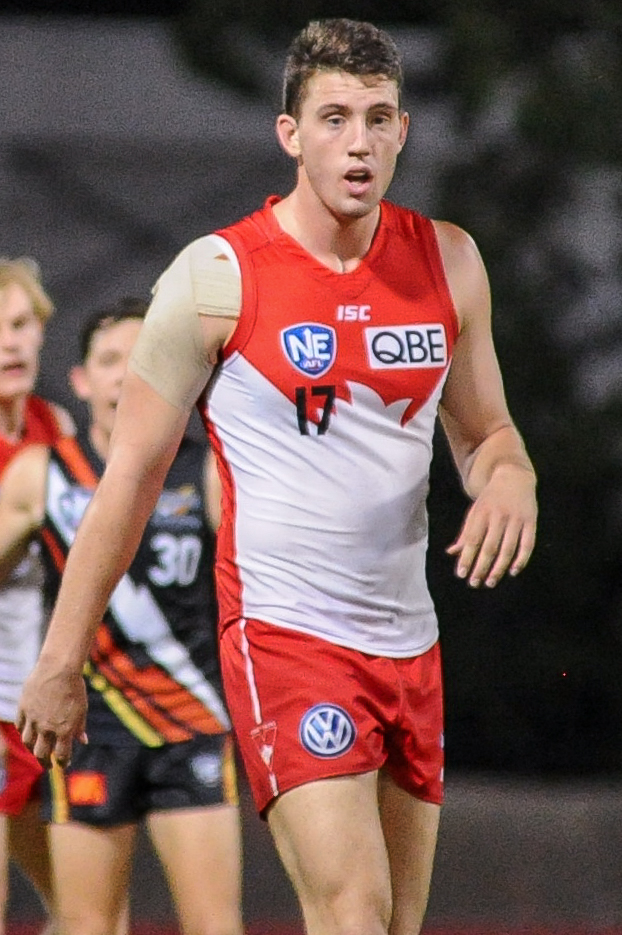
Darcy Cameron is from Albany

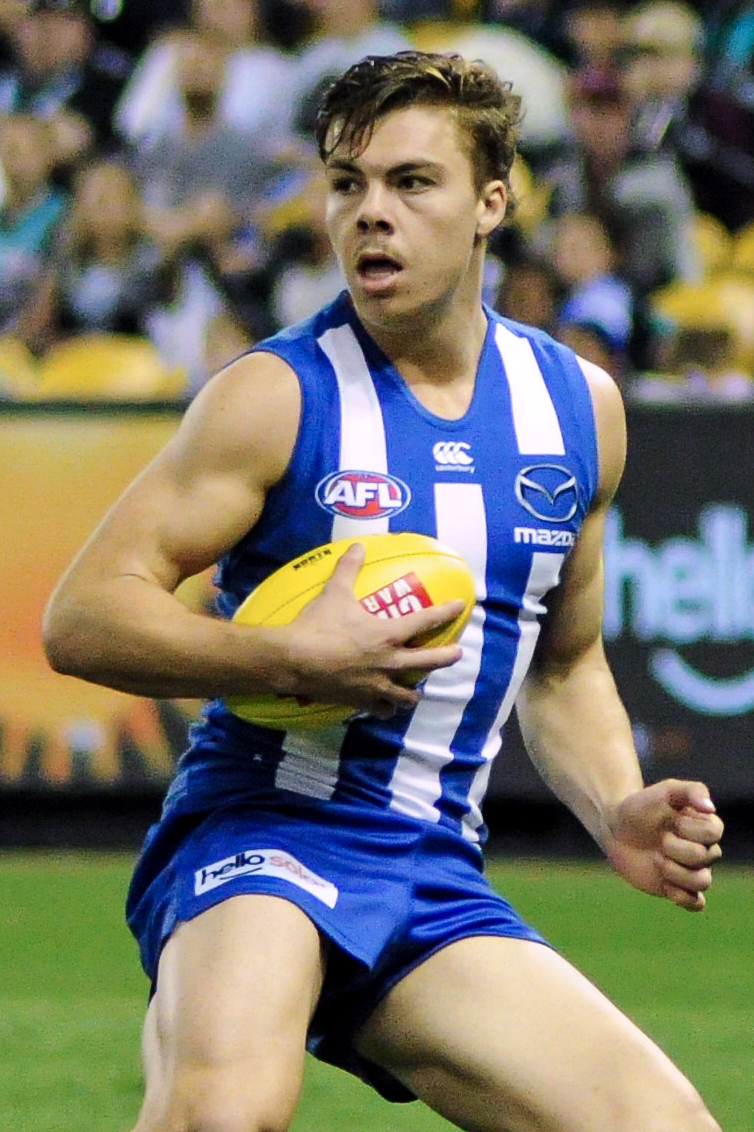
Cameron Zurhaar is from Perth

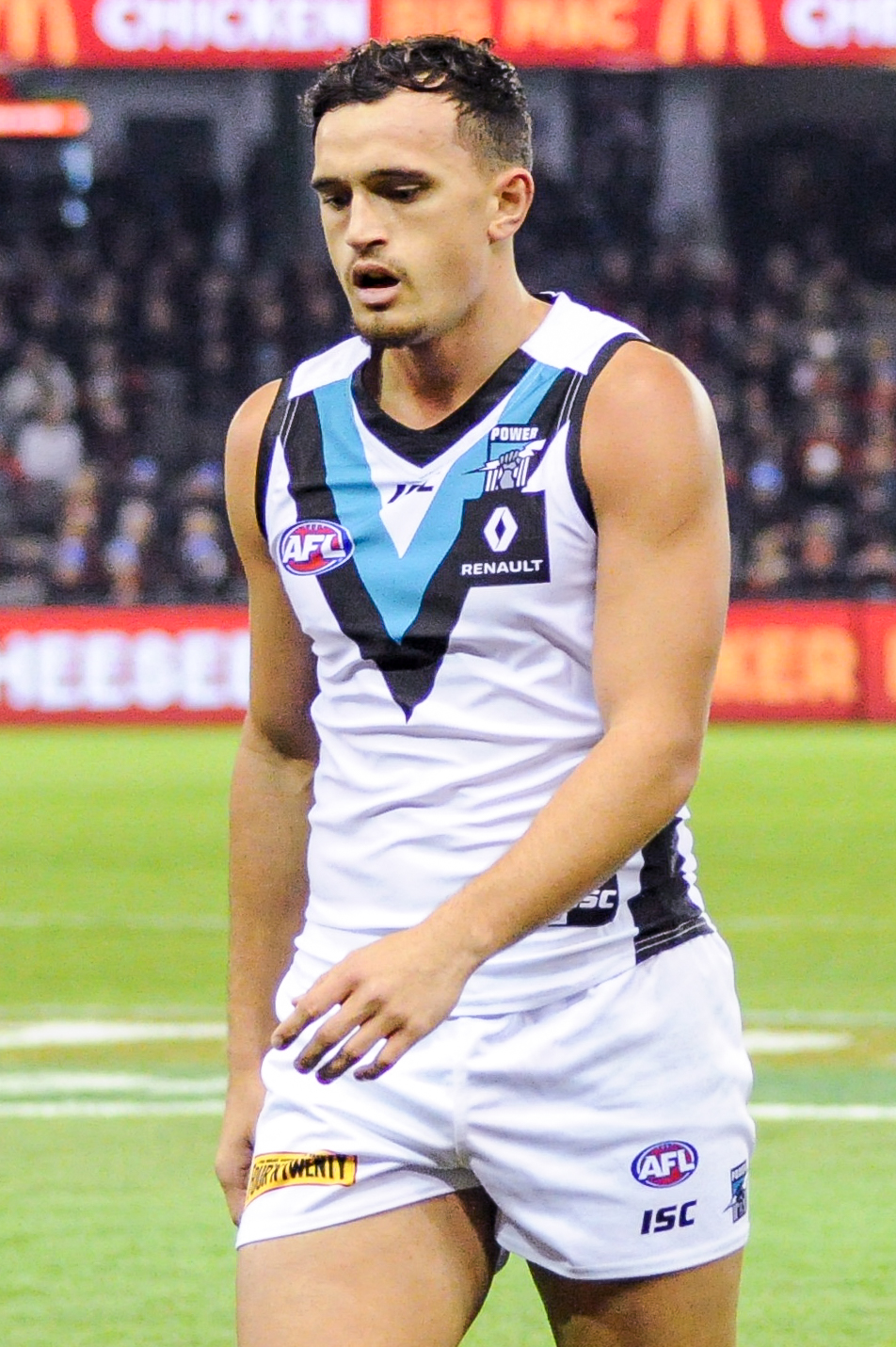
Sam Powell-Pepper is from Perth

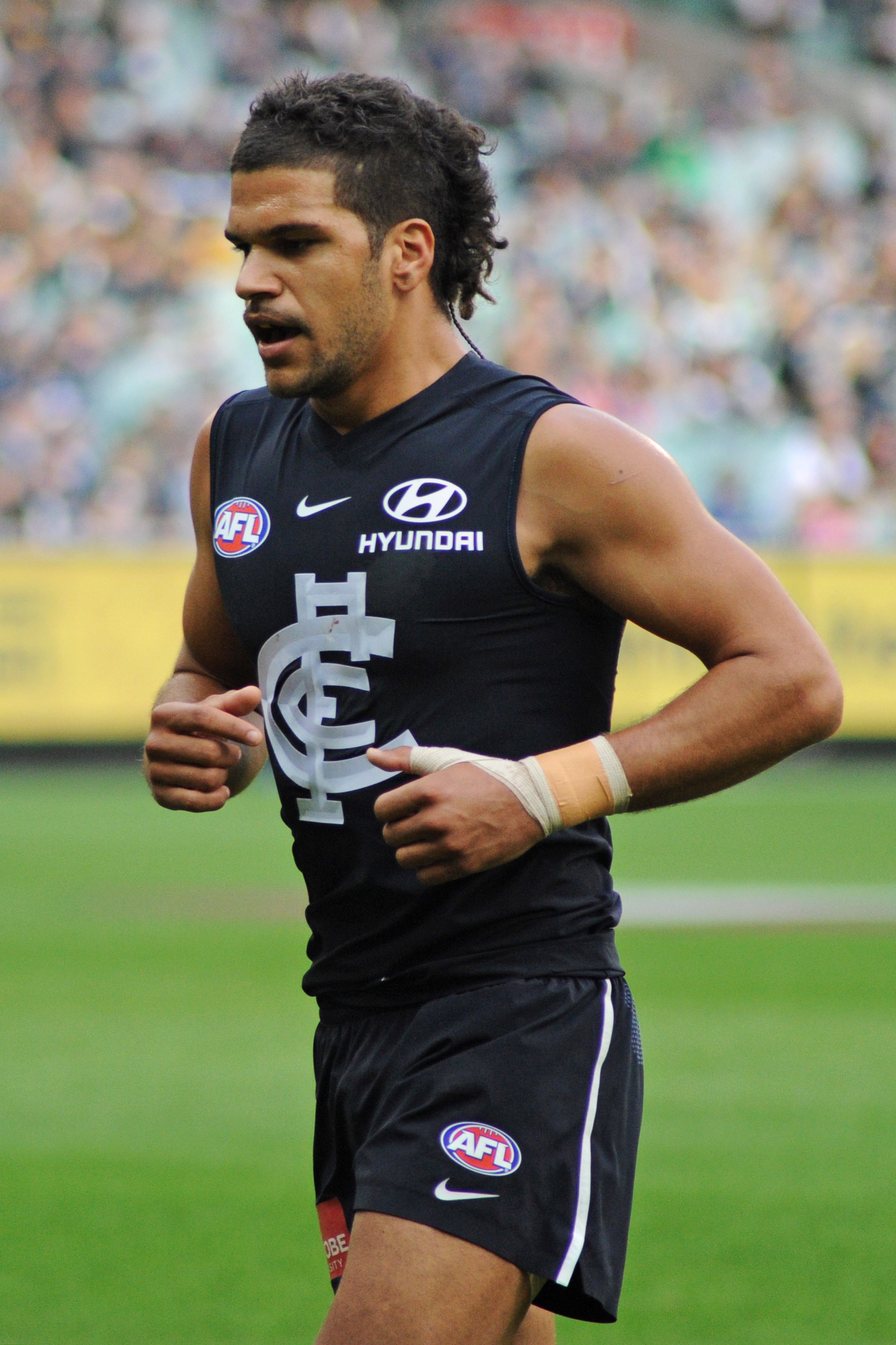
Sam Petrevski-Seton is from Fitzroy Crossing and Halls Creek

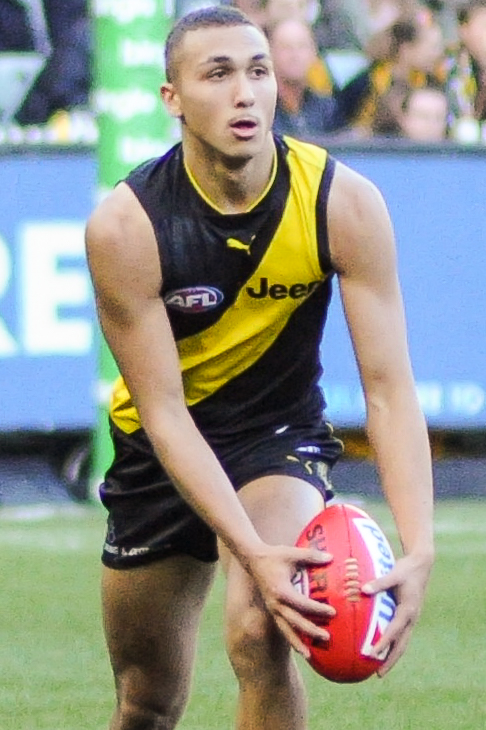
Shai Bolton is from Katanning and Mandurah

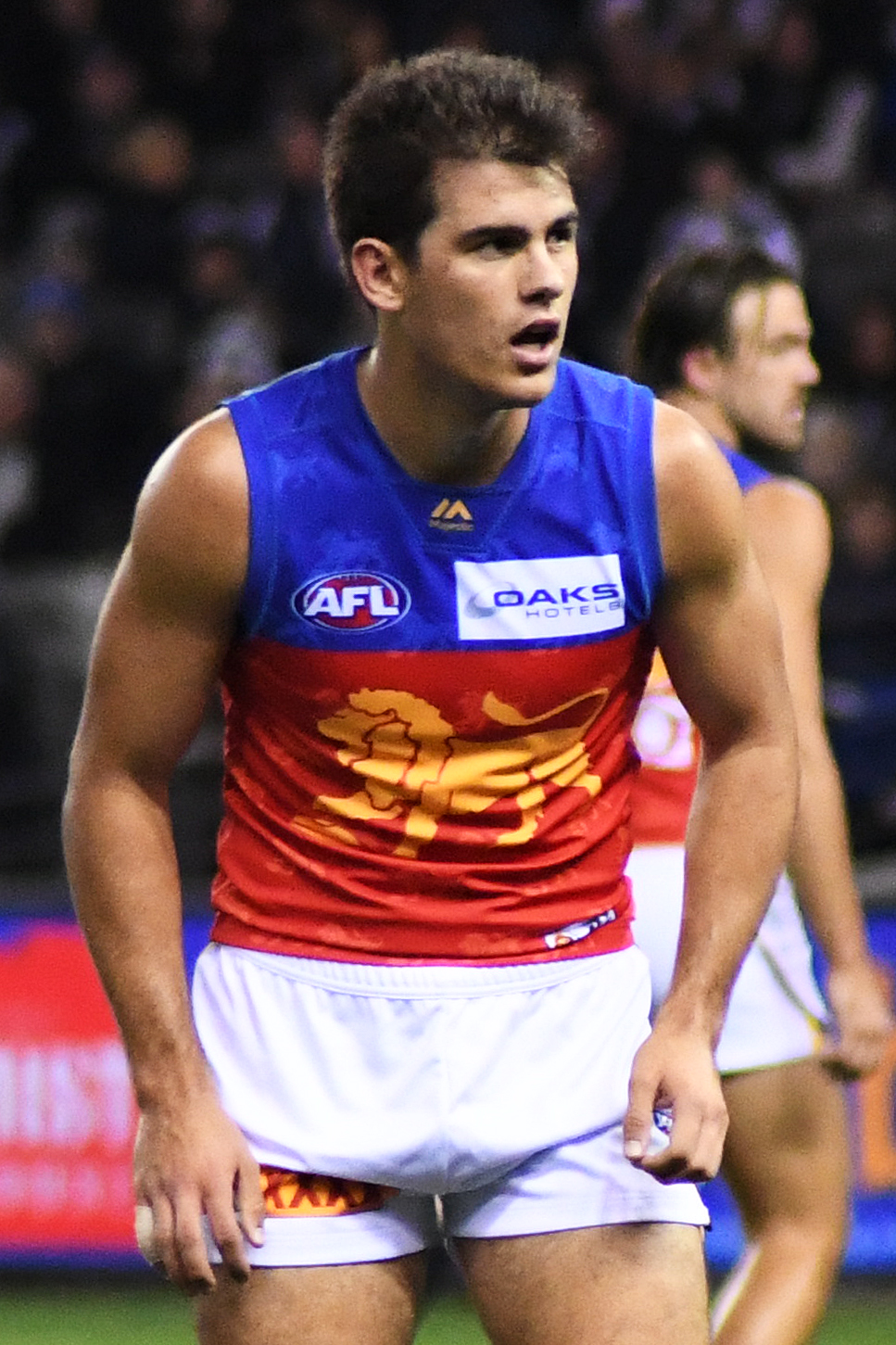
Brandon Starcevich is from Perth

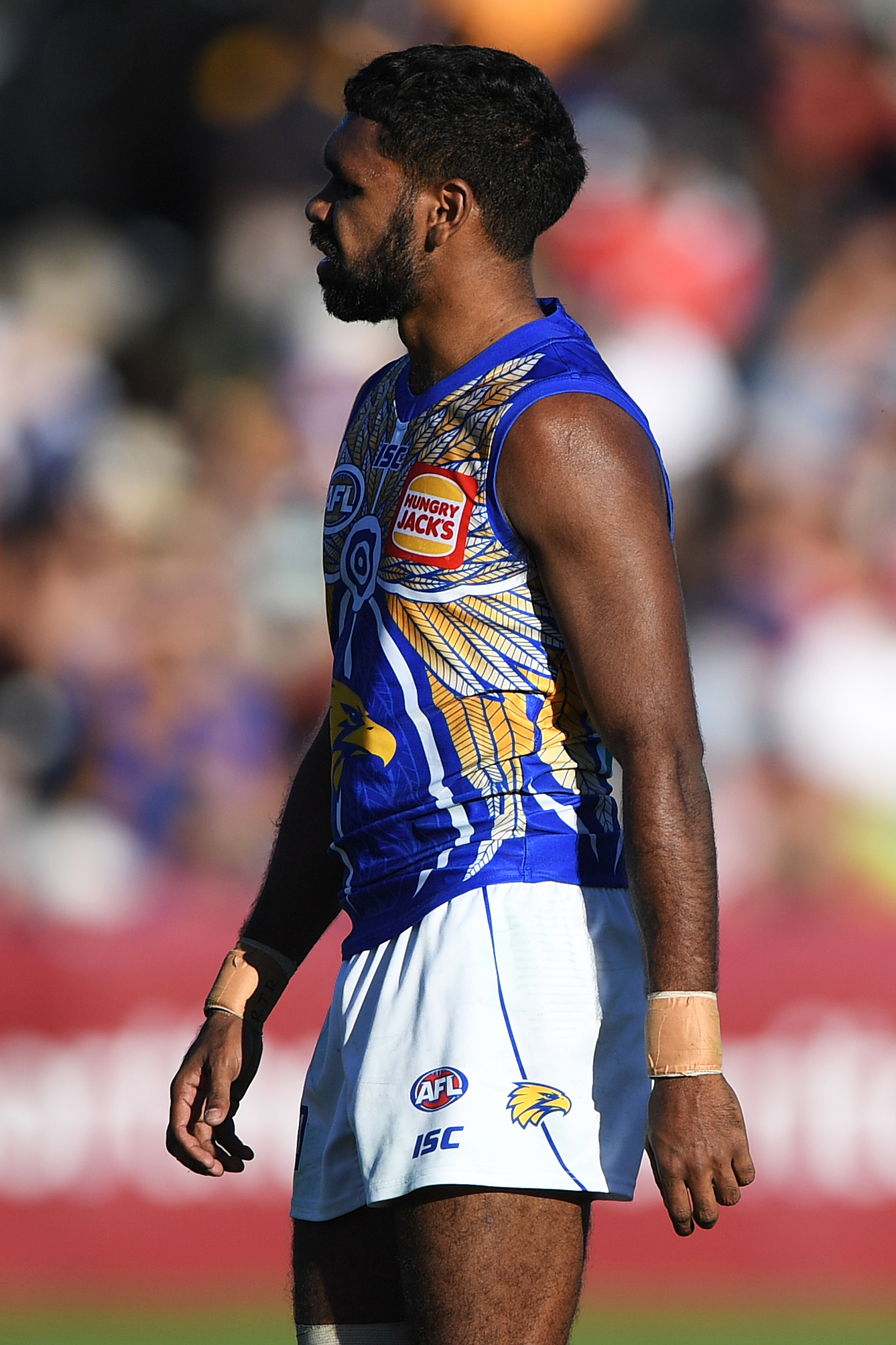
Liam Ryan is from Geraldton

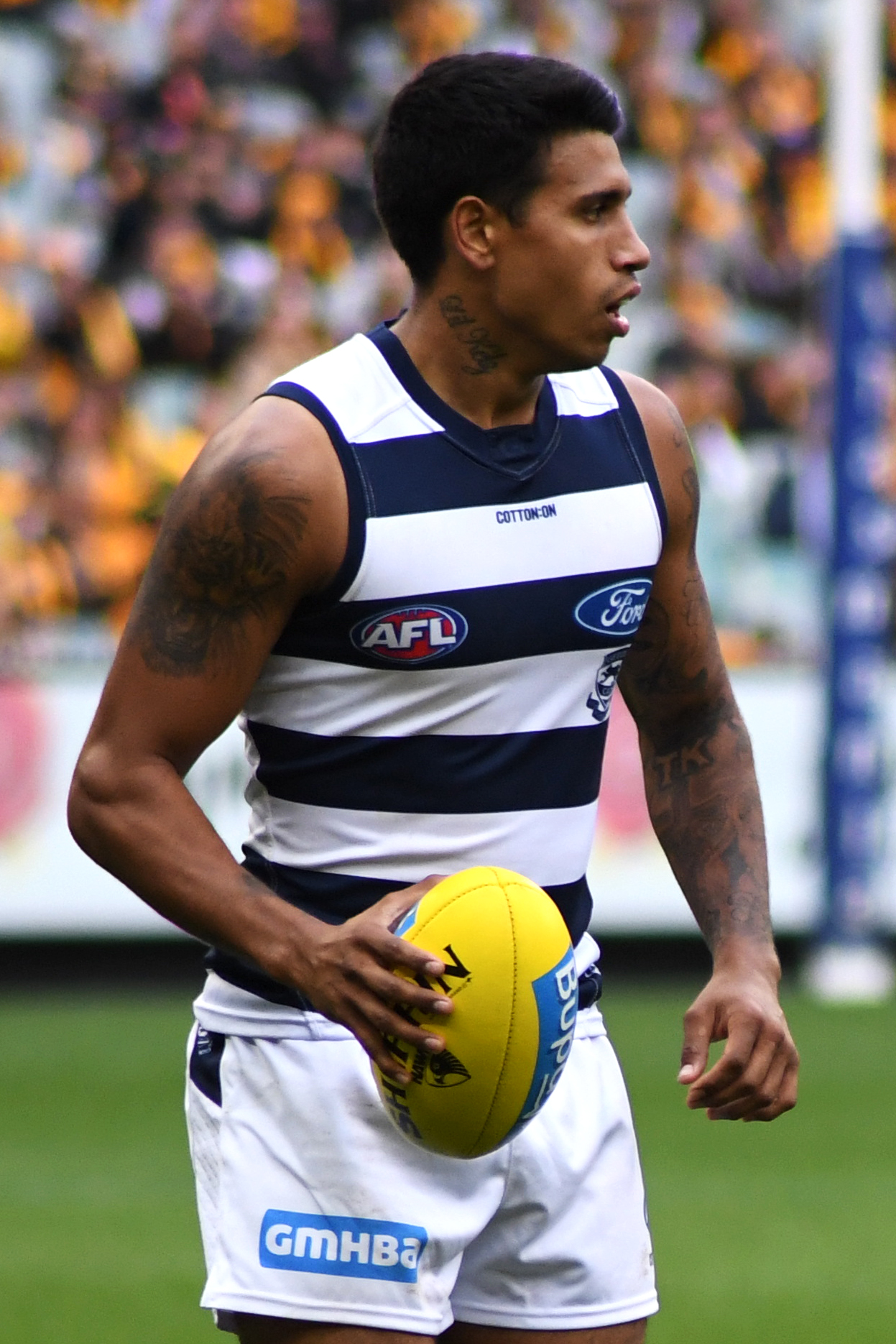
Tim Kelly is from Perth and Goomalling

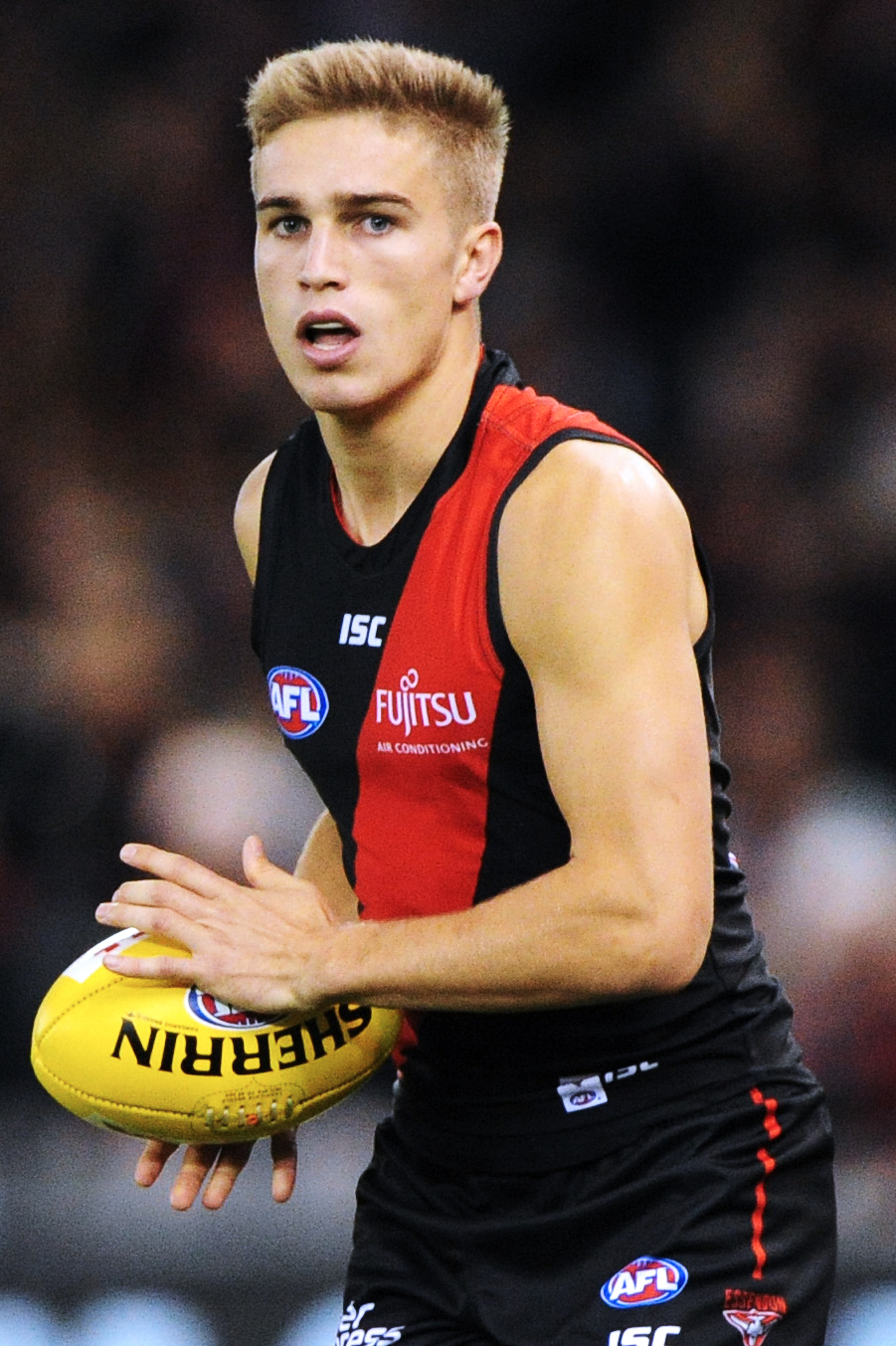
Matt Guelfi is from Perth

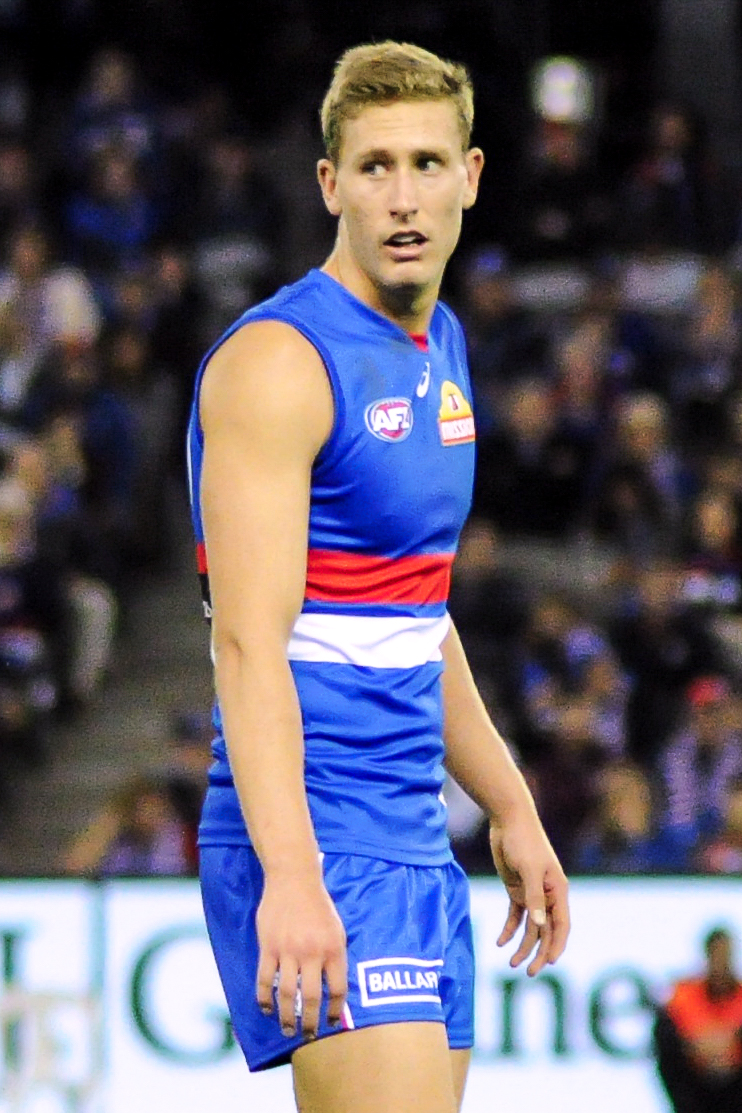
Aaron Naughton is from Rockingham

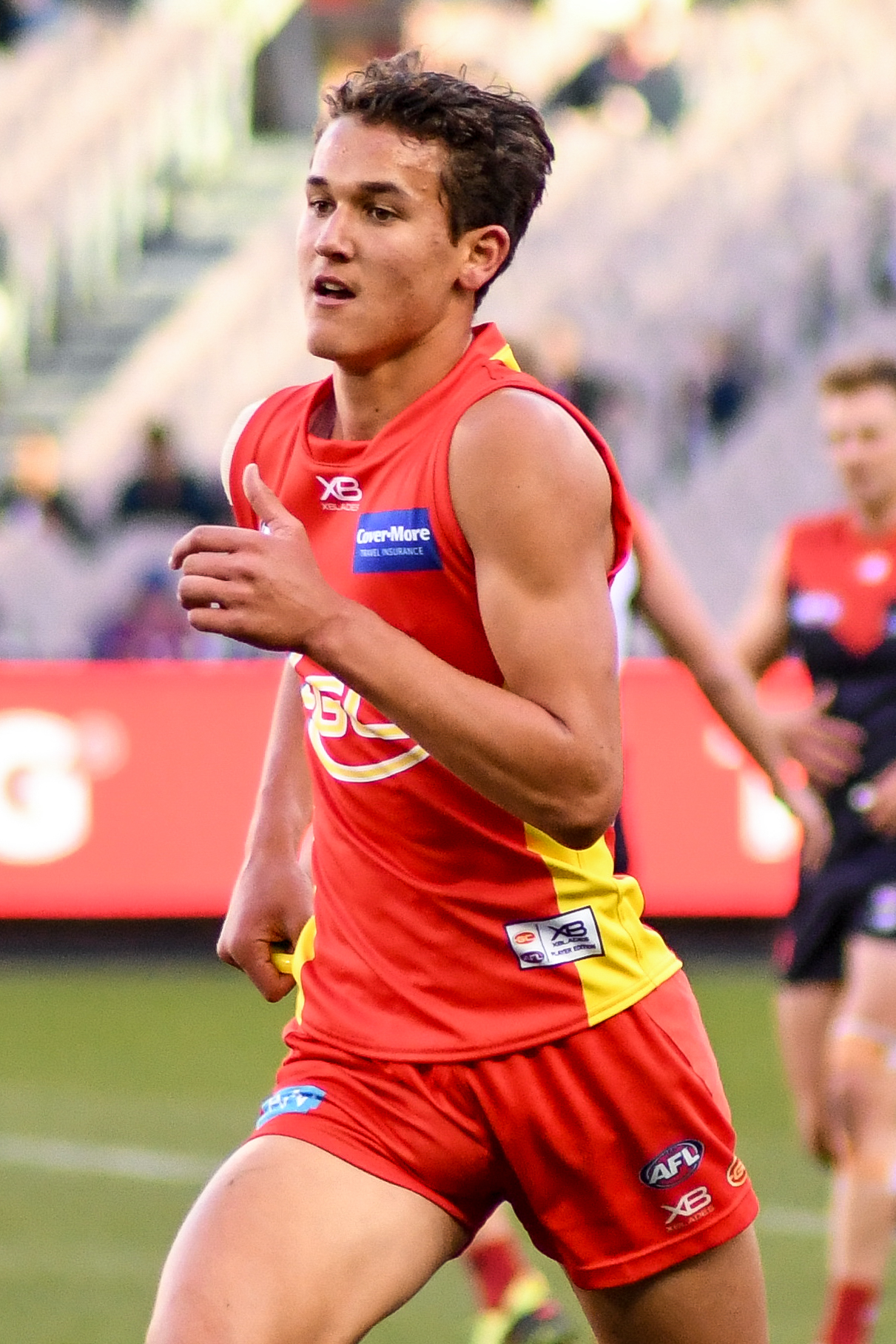
Wil Powell is from Perth

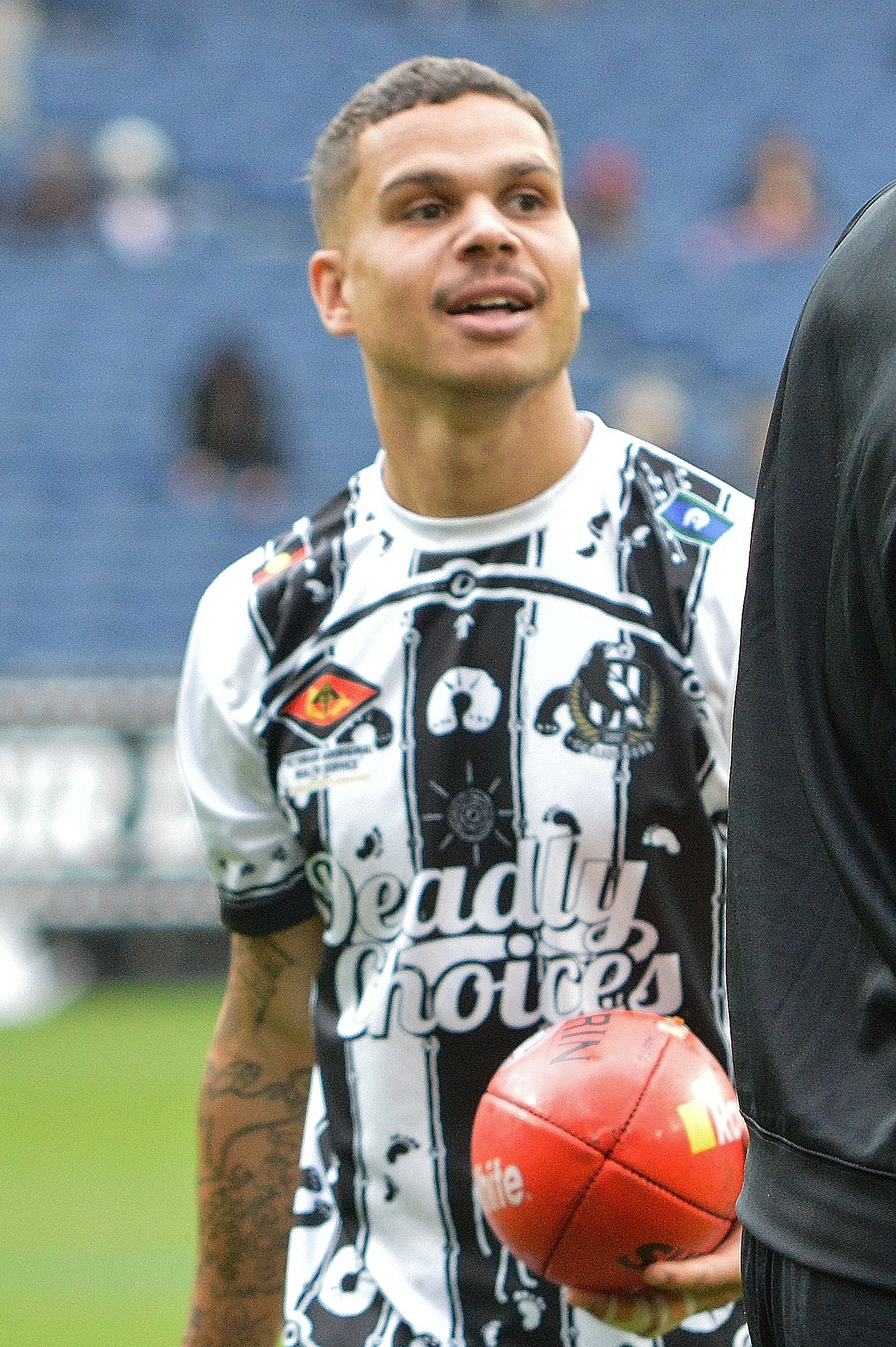
Bobby Hill is from Northam

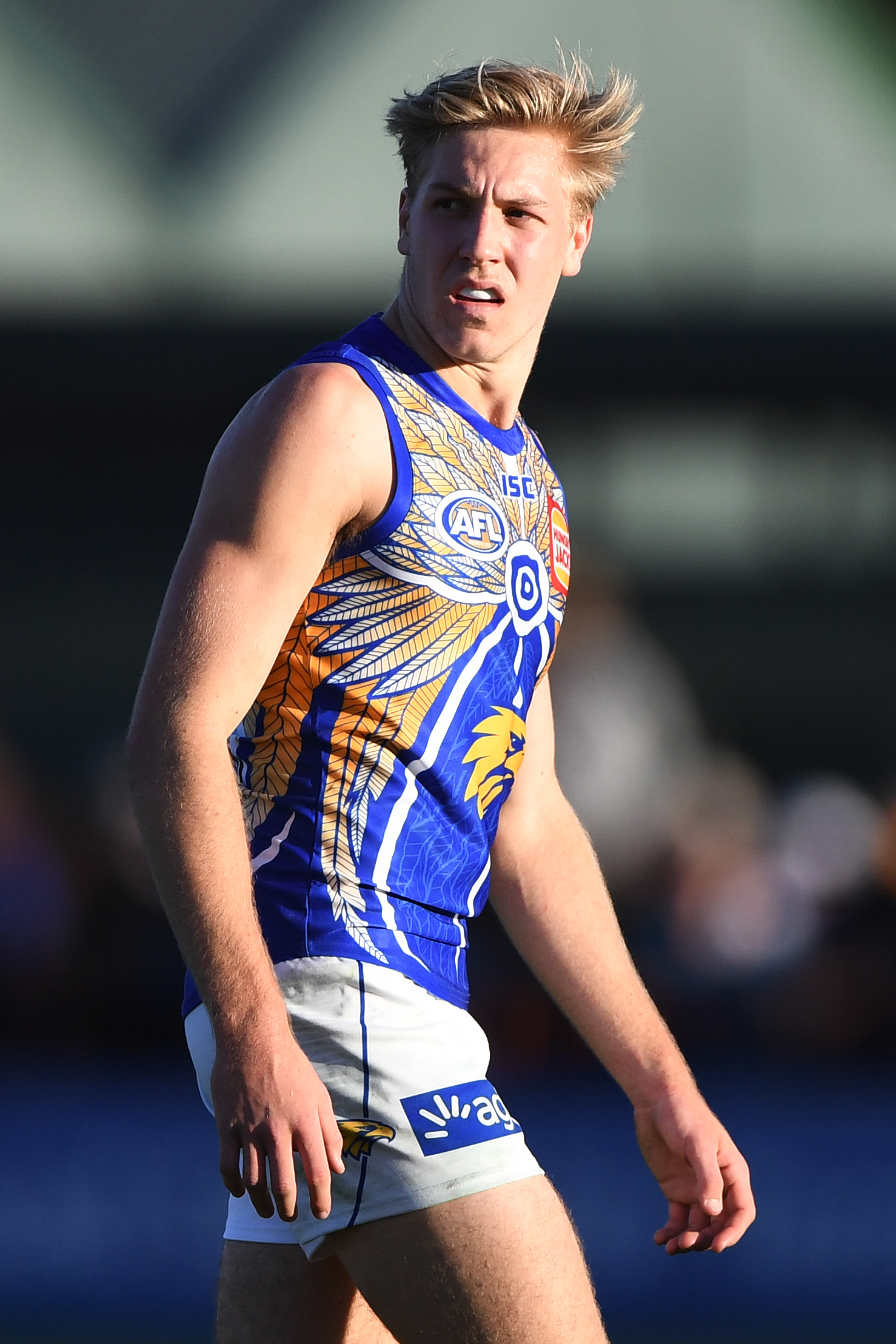
Oscar Allen is from Perth

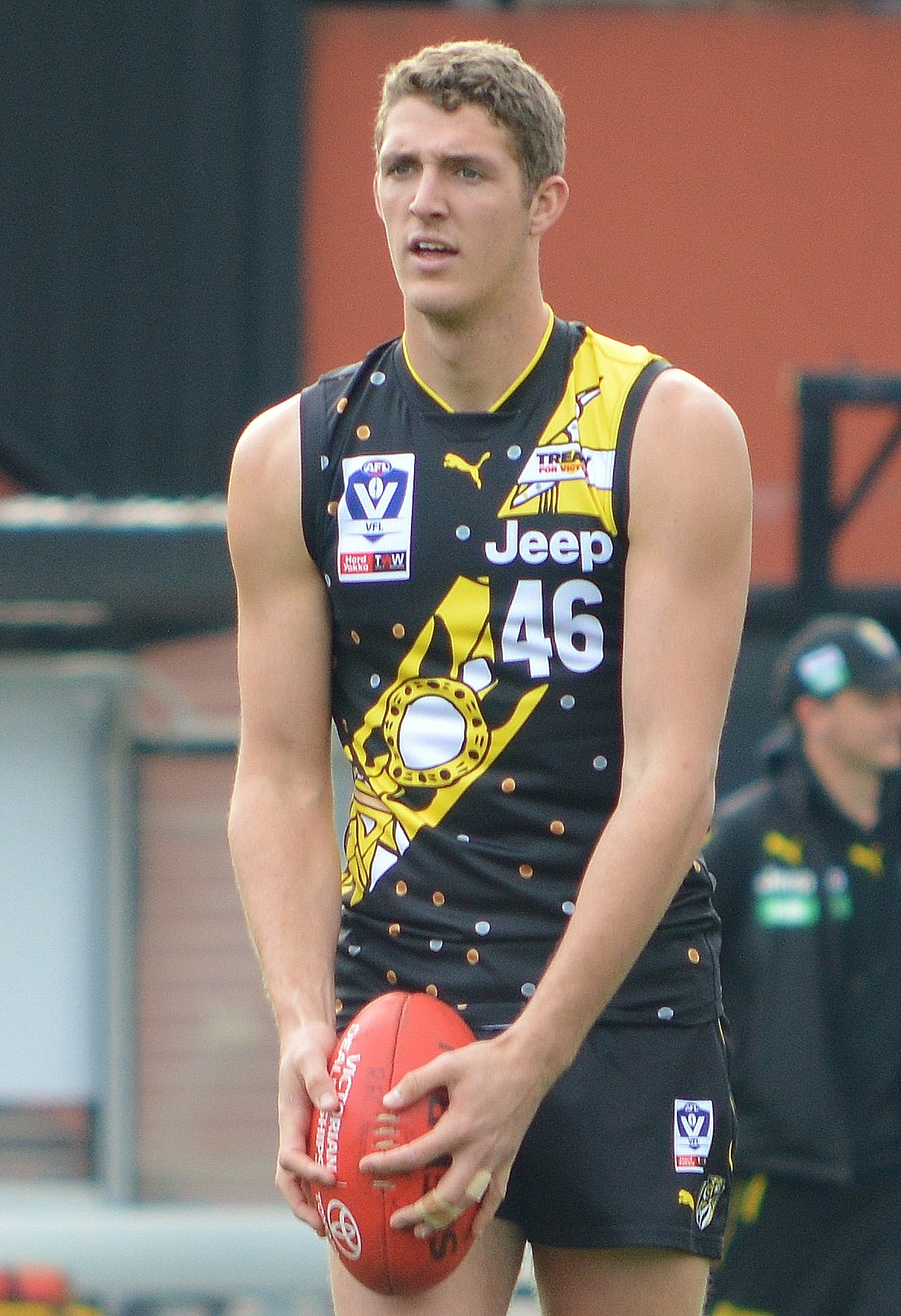
Ben Miller is from Kalgoorlie

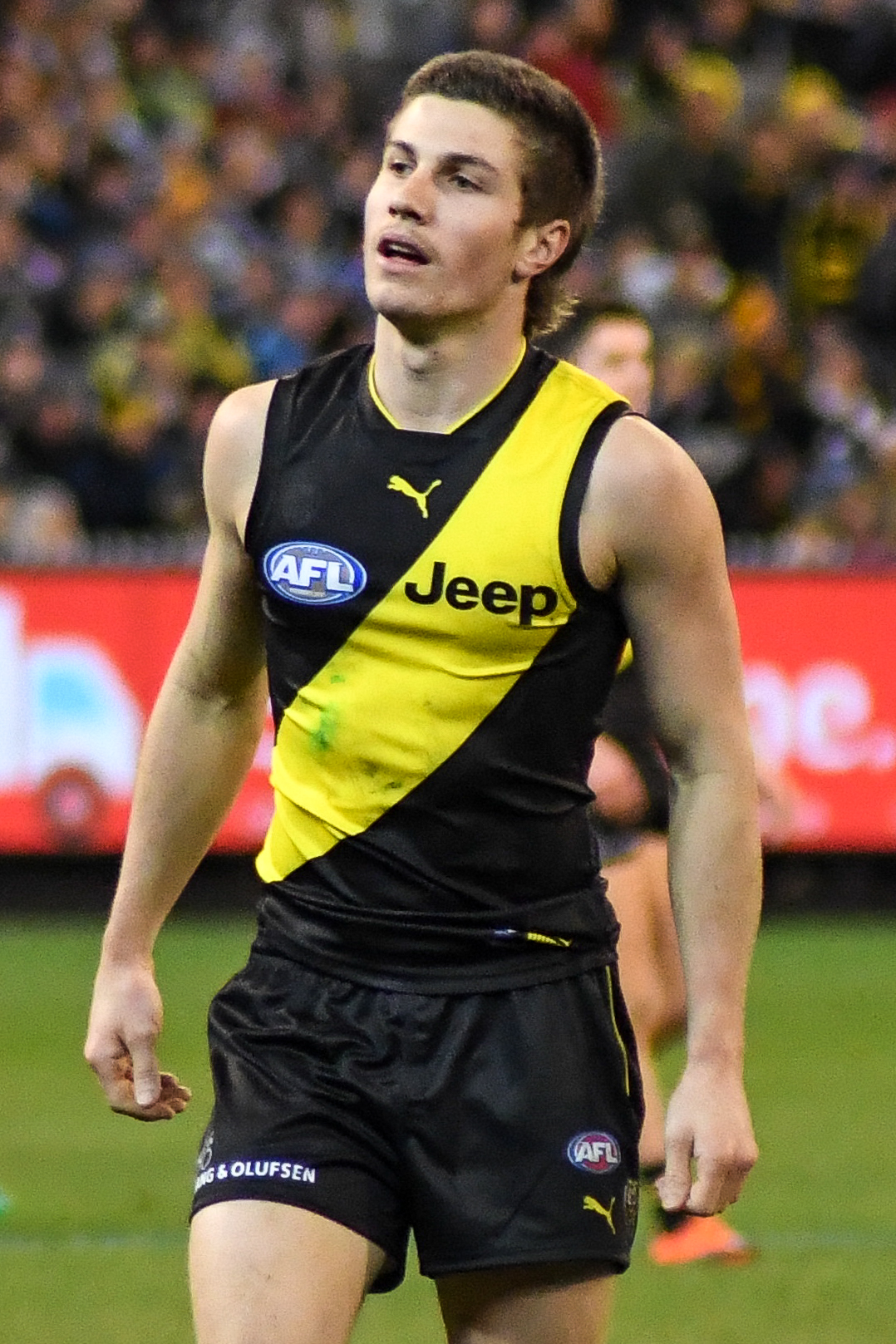
Liam Baker is from Pingaring

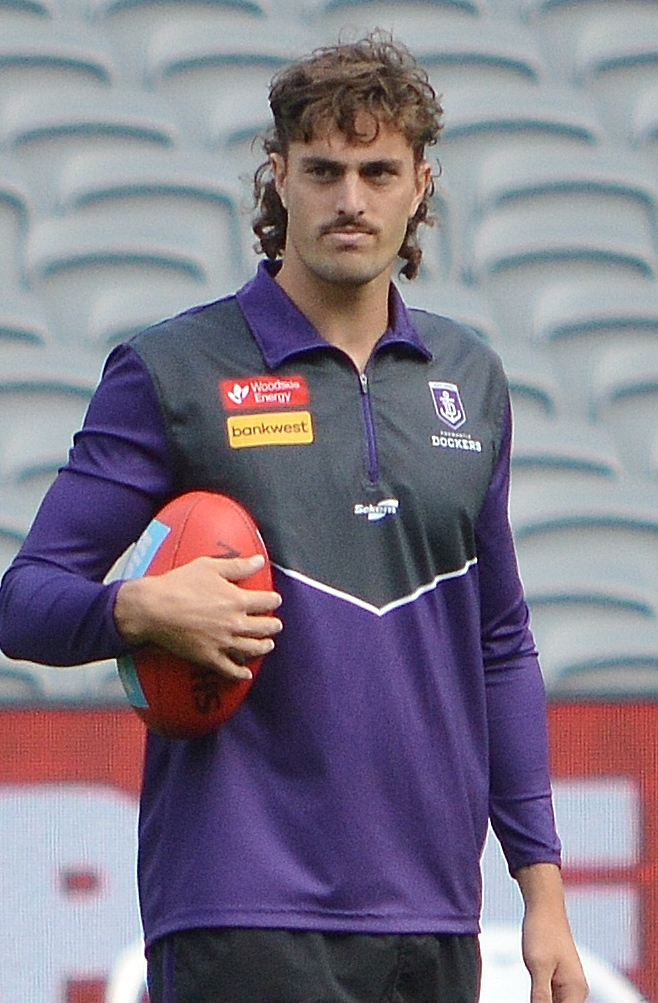
Luke Jackson is from Fremantle

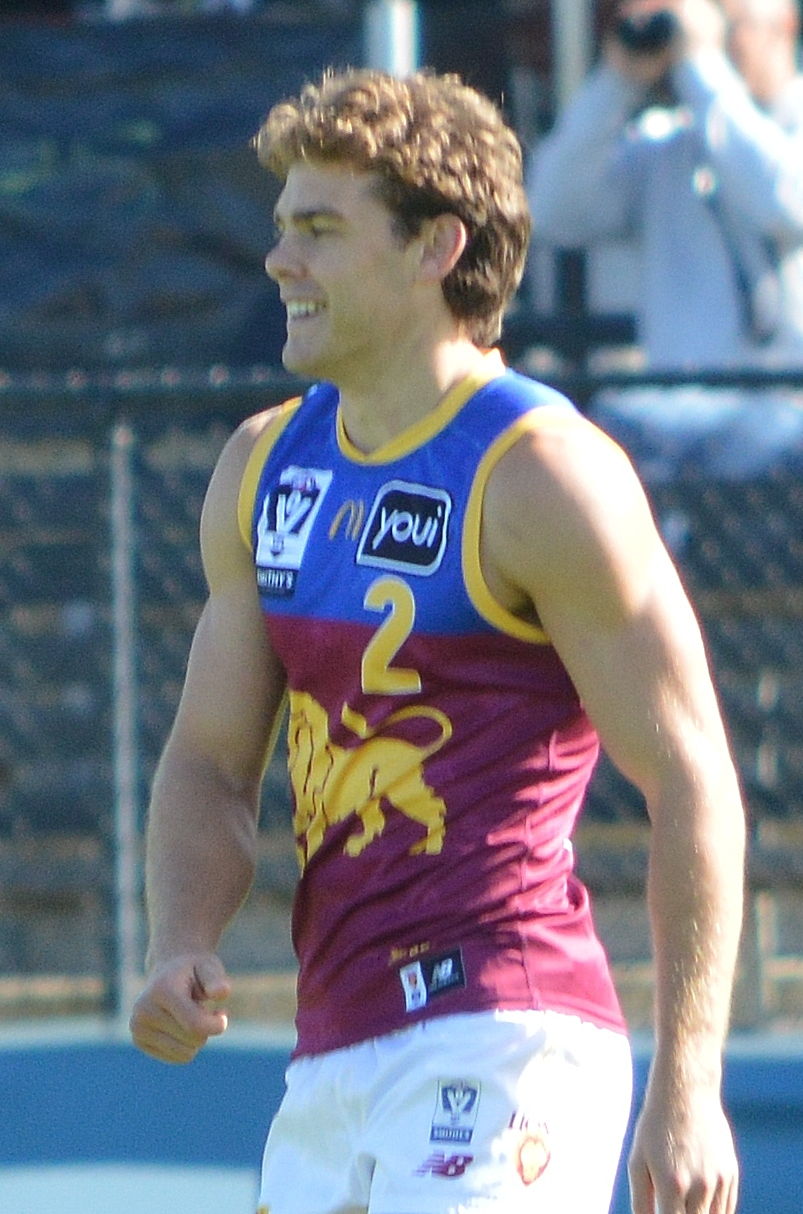
Deven Robertson is from Northam

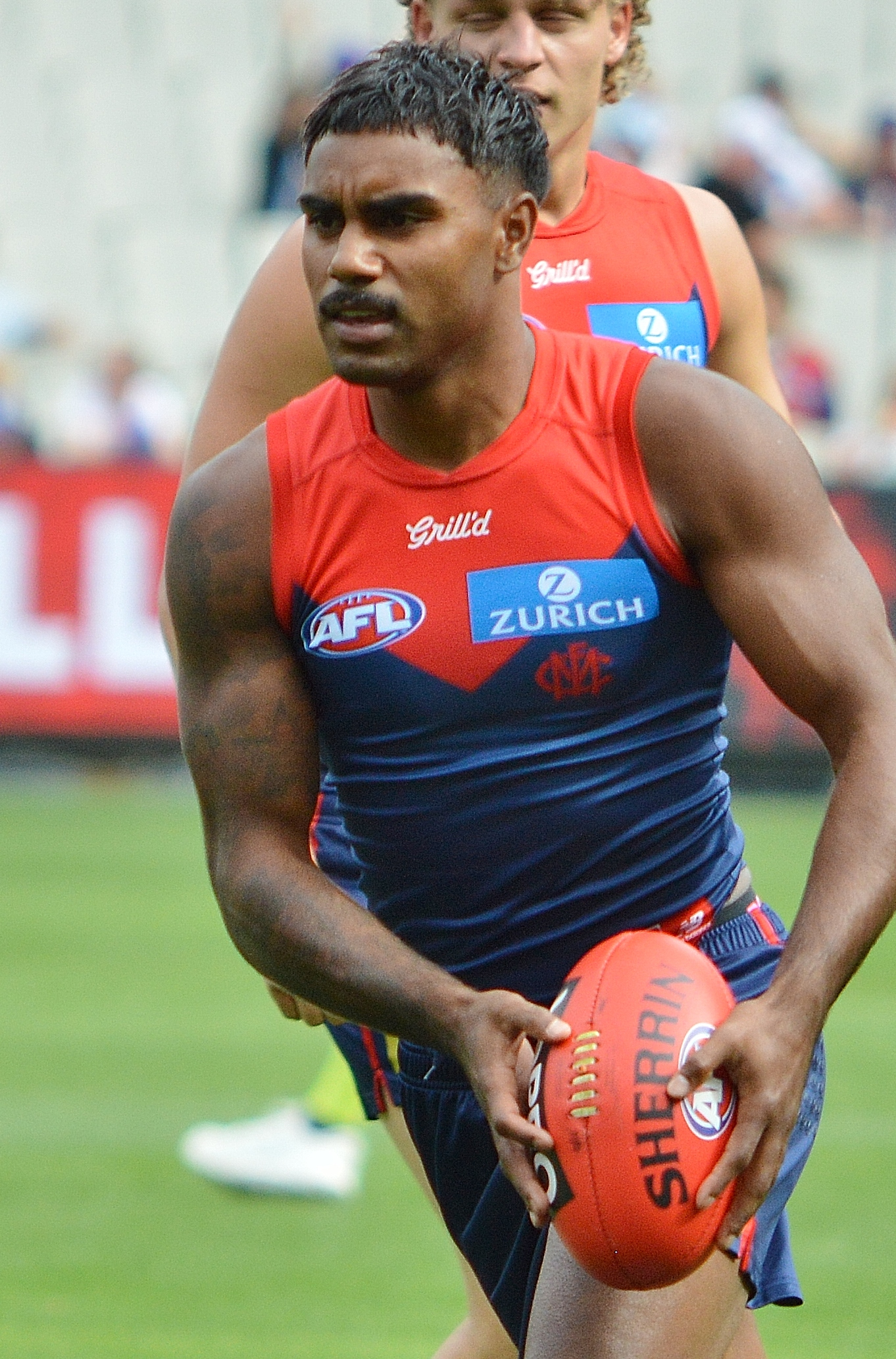
Kysaiah Pickett was raised in Quairading

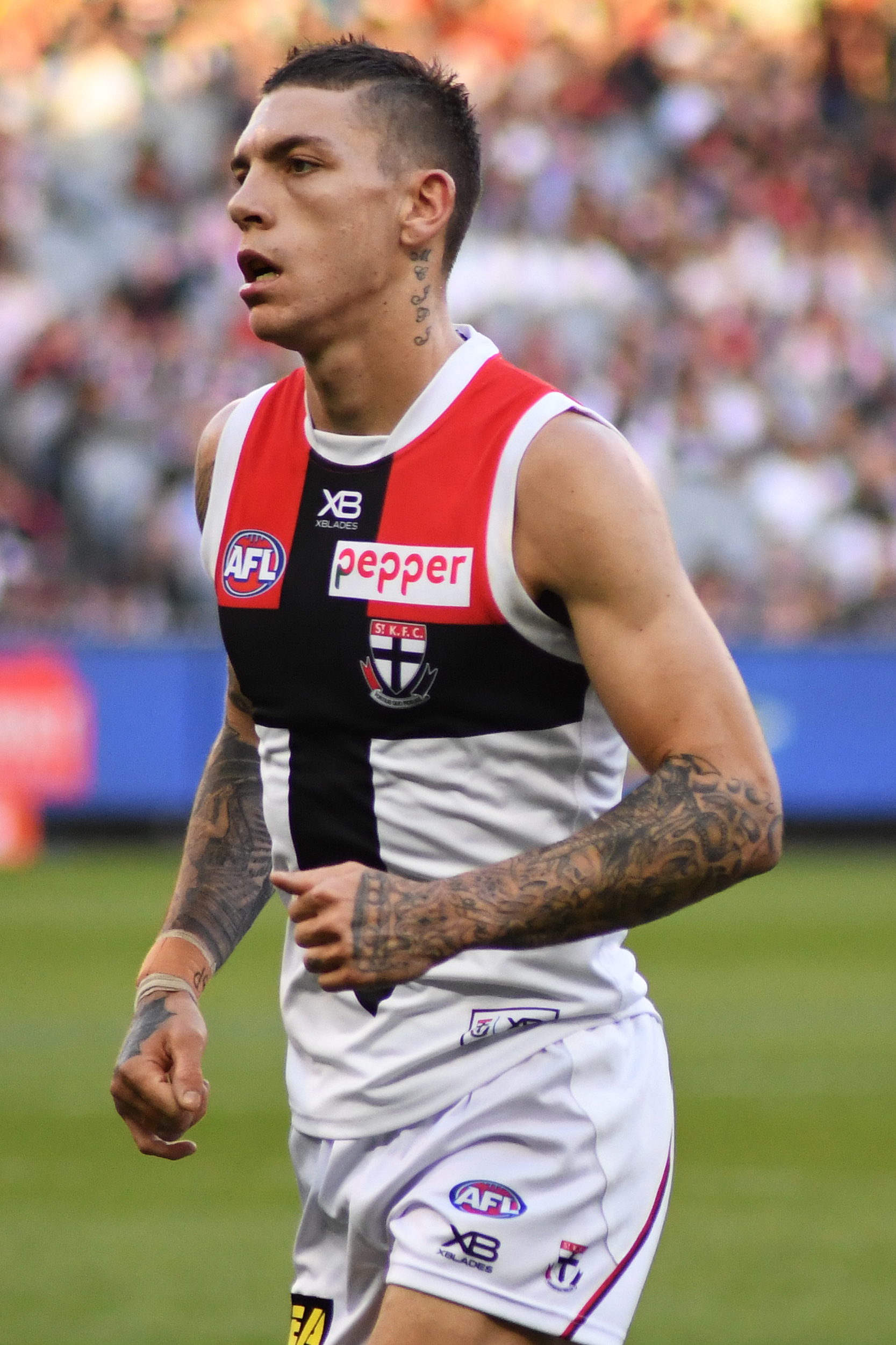
Matthew Parker is from Perth

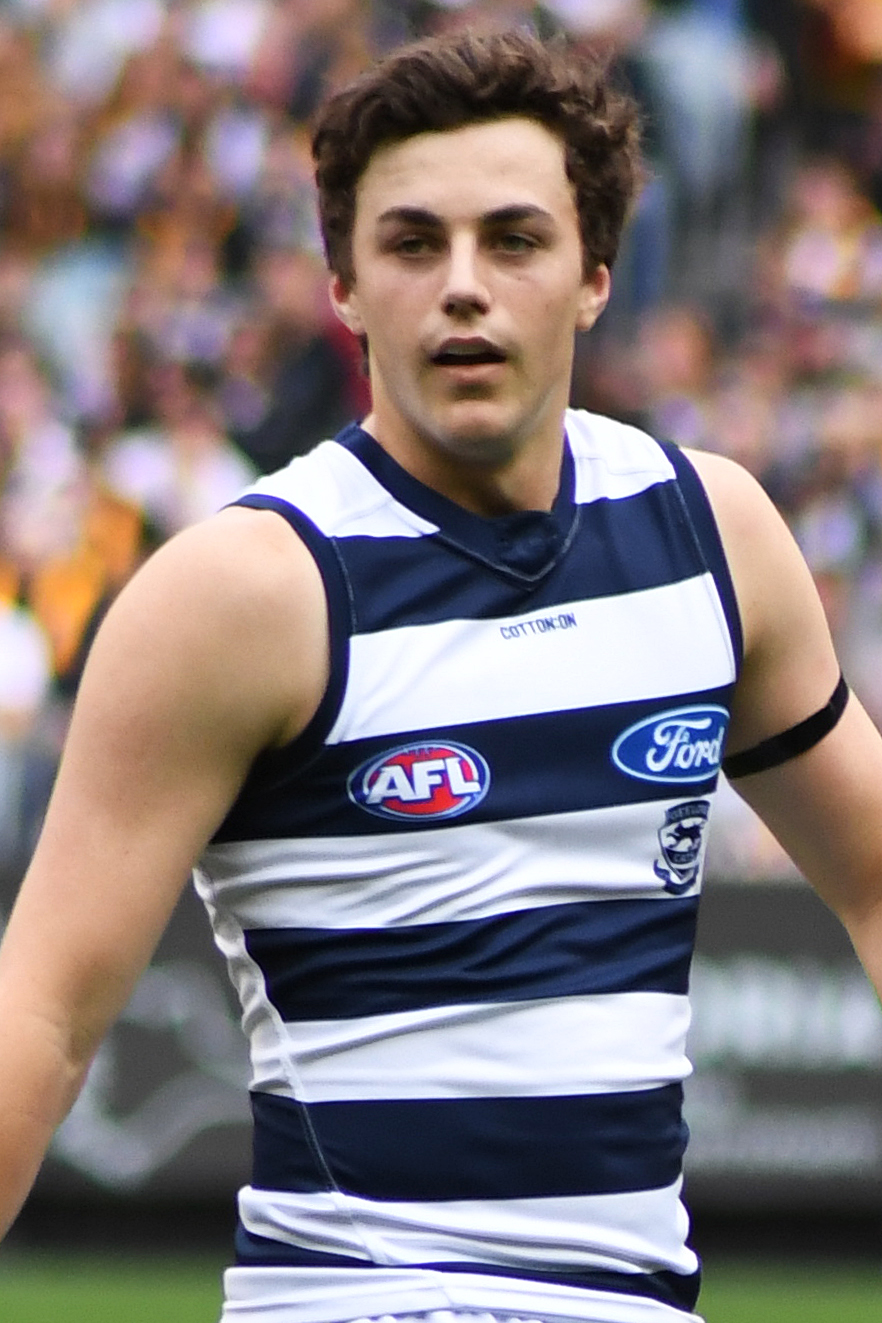
Jordan Clark is from Albany

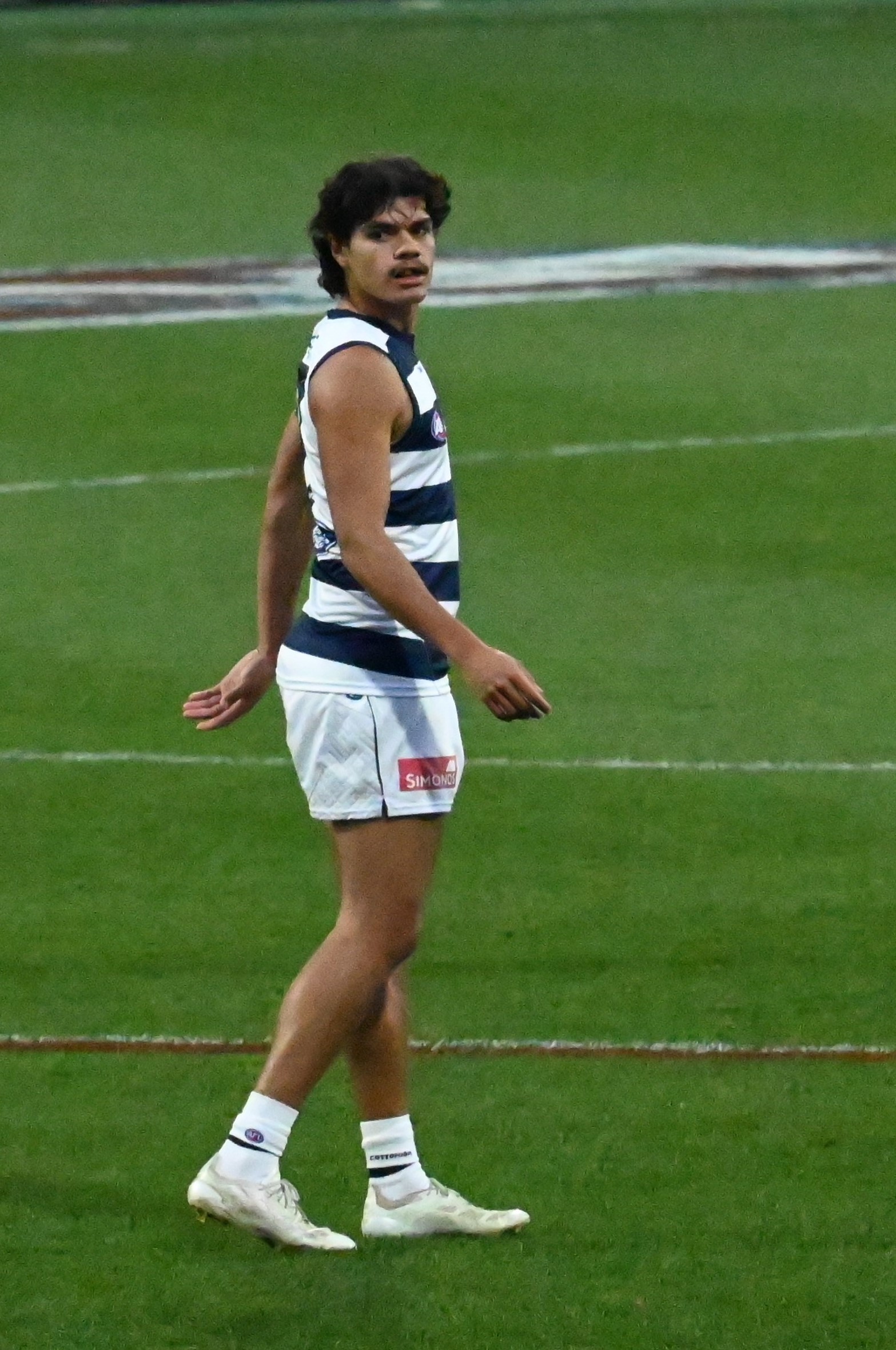
Lawson Humphries is from Perth

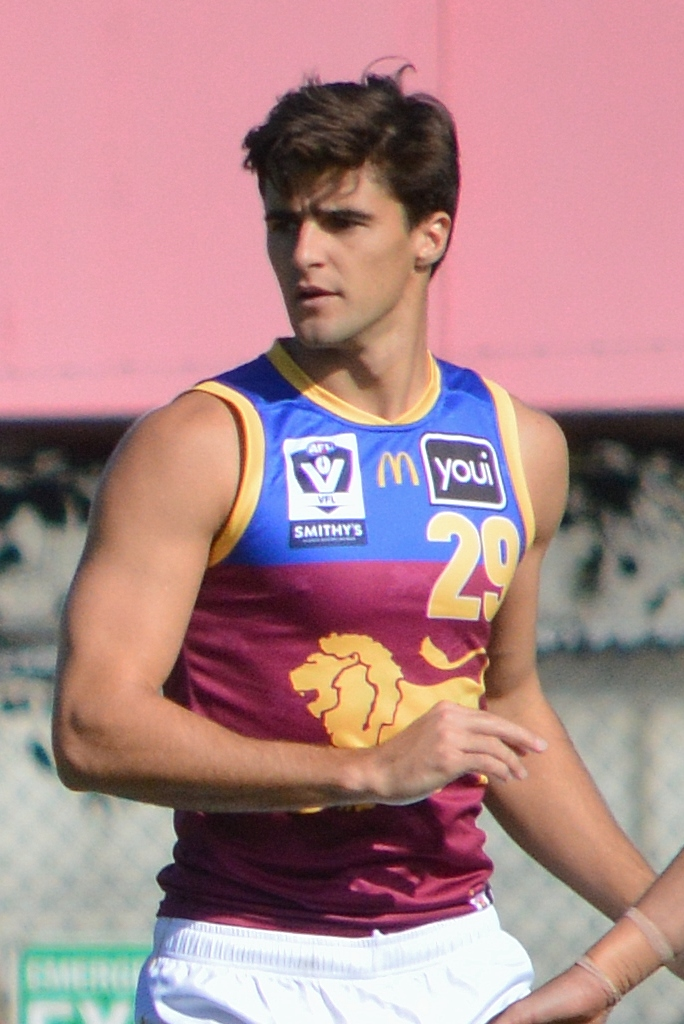
James Tunstill is from Busselton

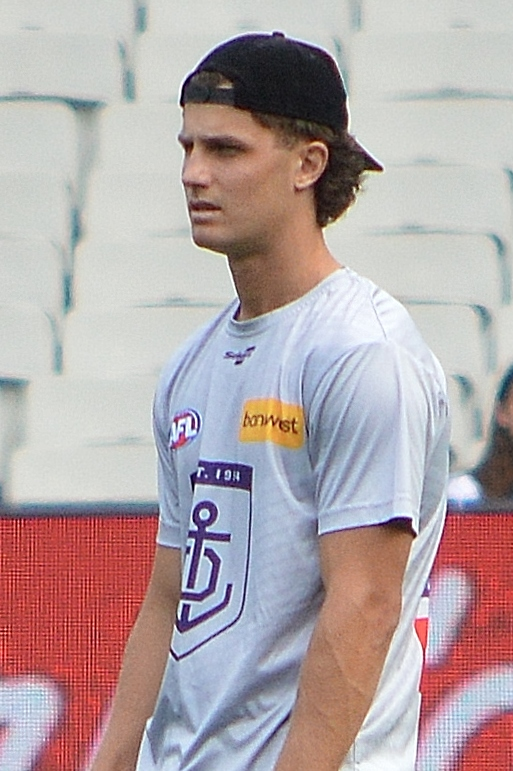
Neil Erasmus

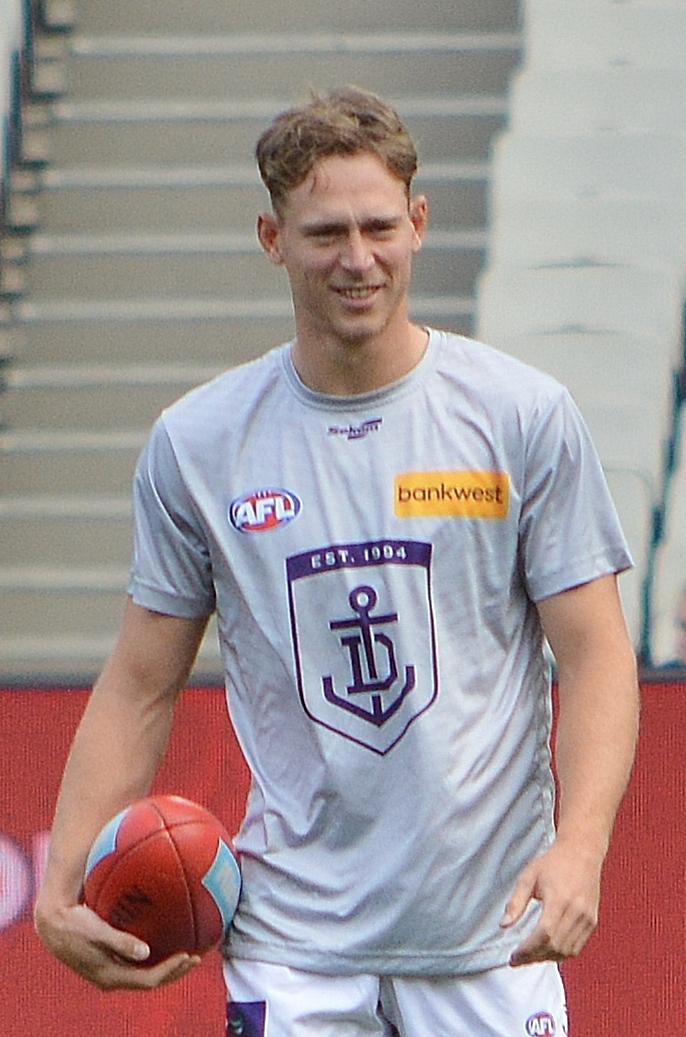
Matthew Johnson

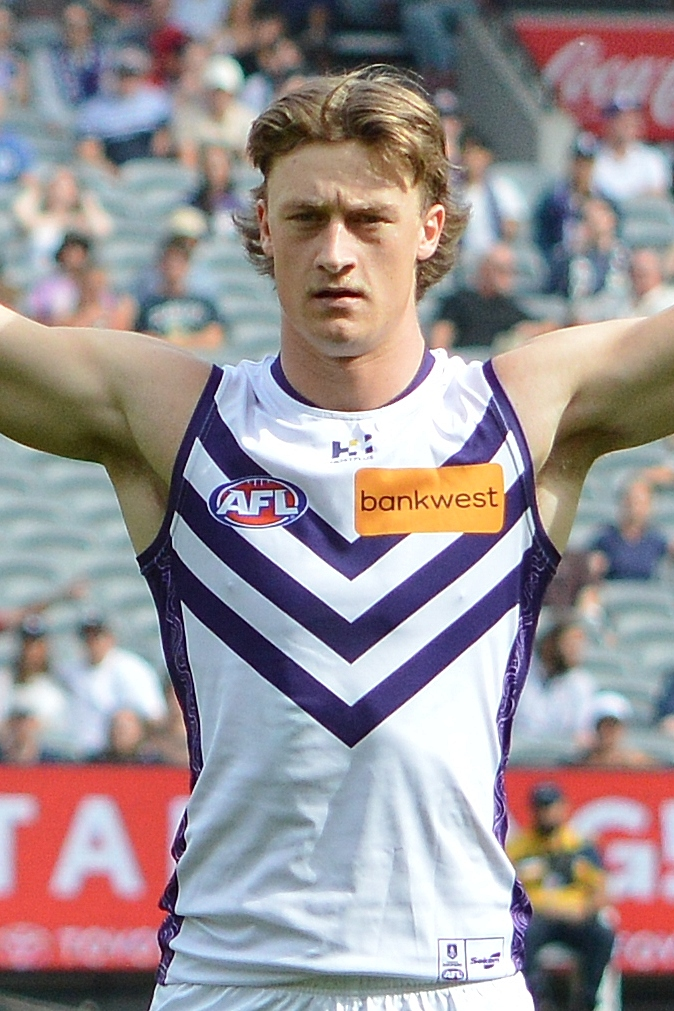
Jye Amiss is from Busselton

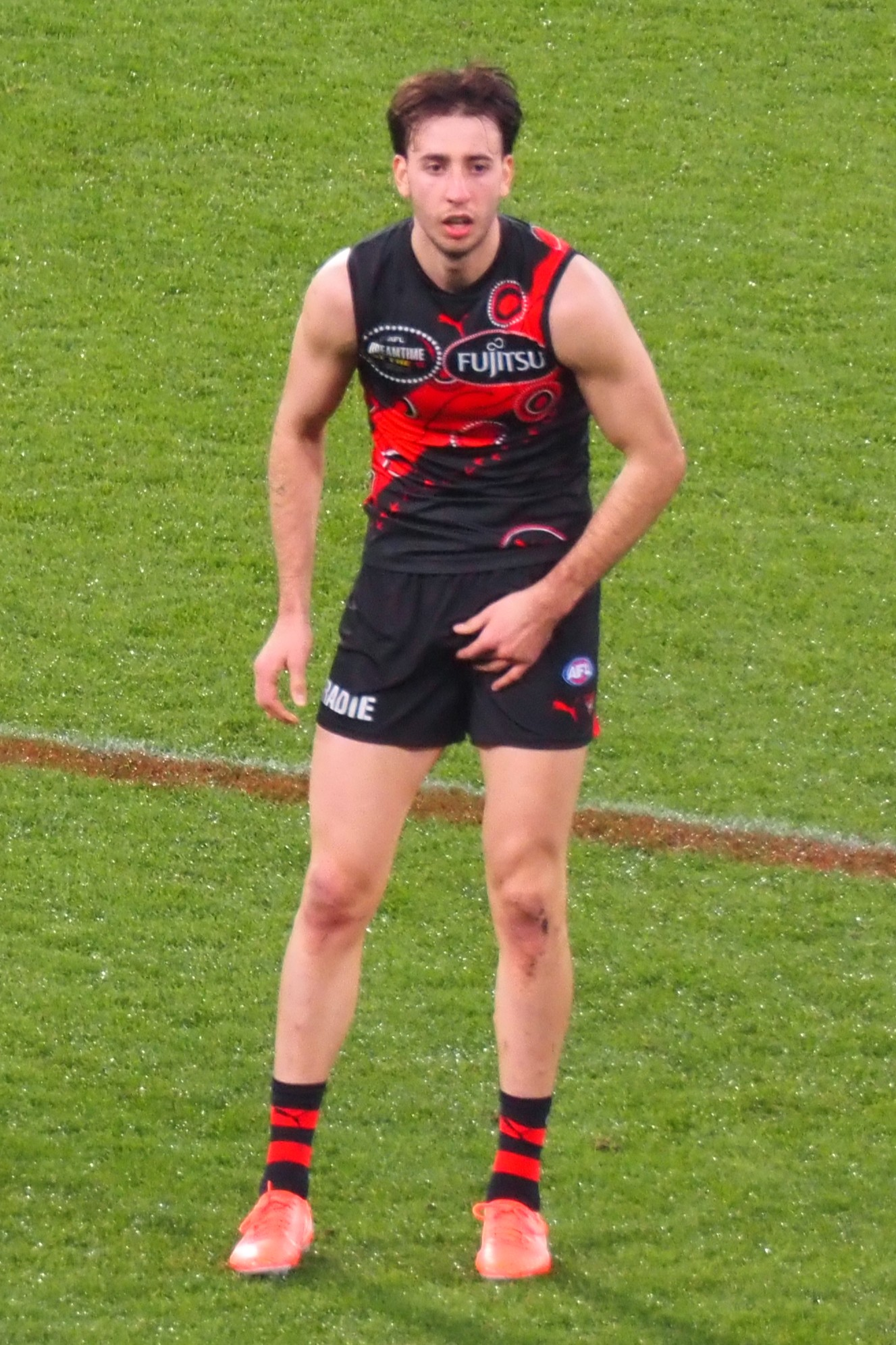
Nic Martin

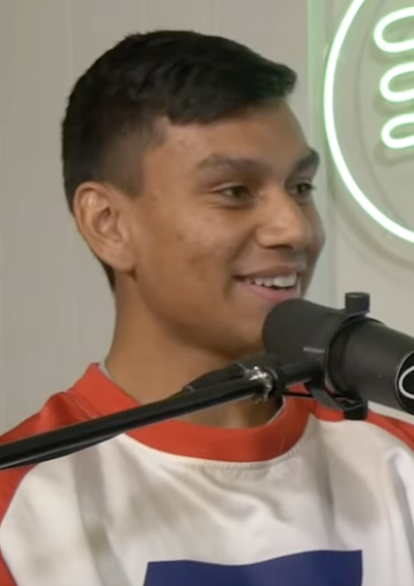
Jesse Motlop

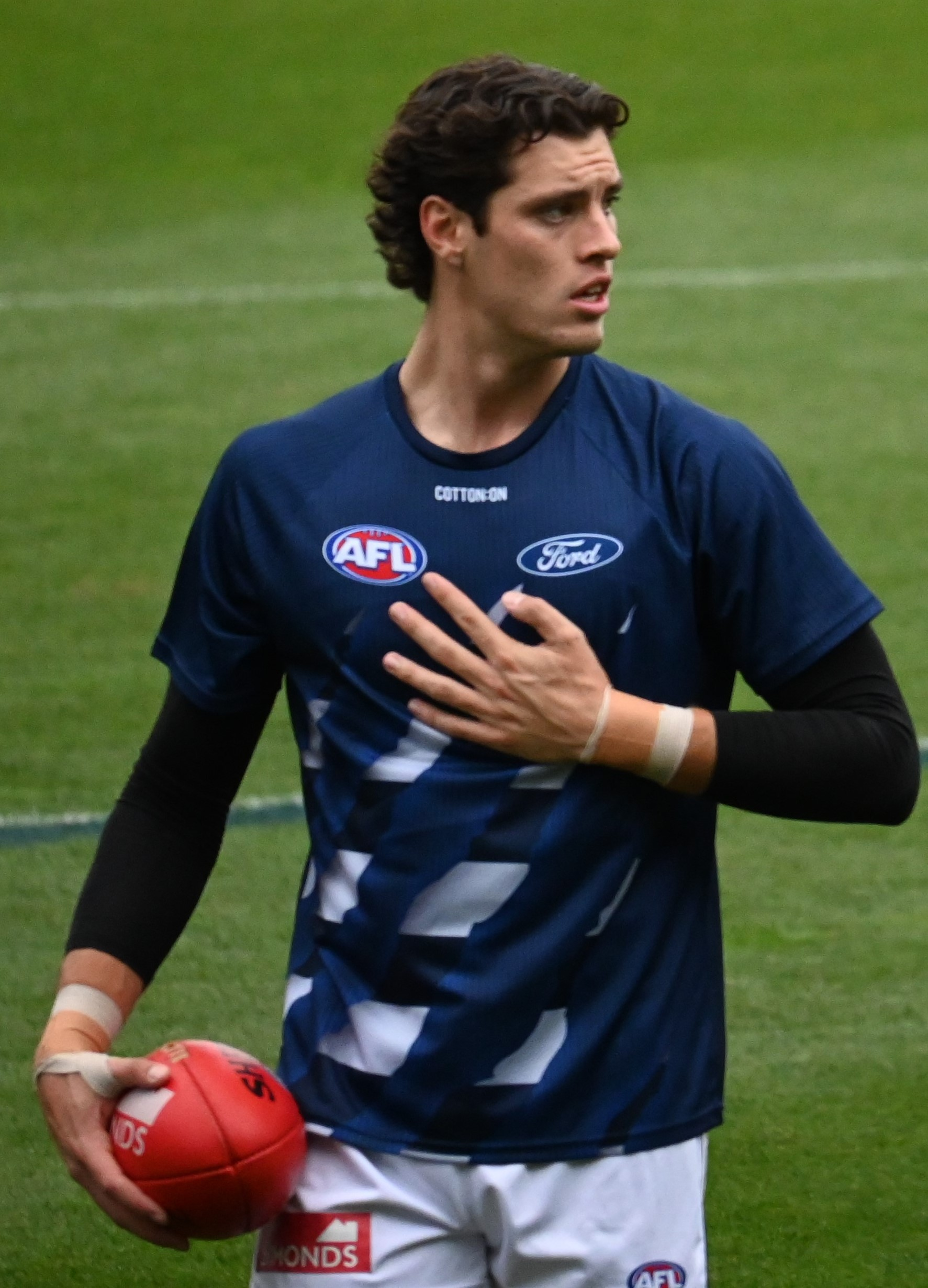
Shannon Neale is from Perth

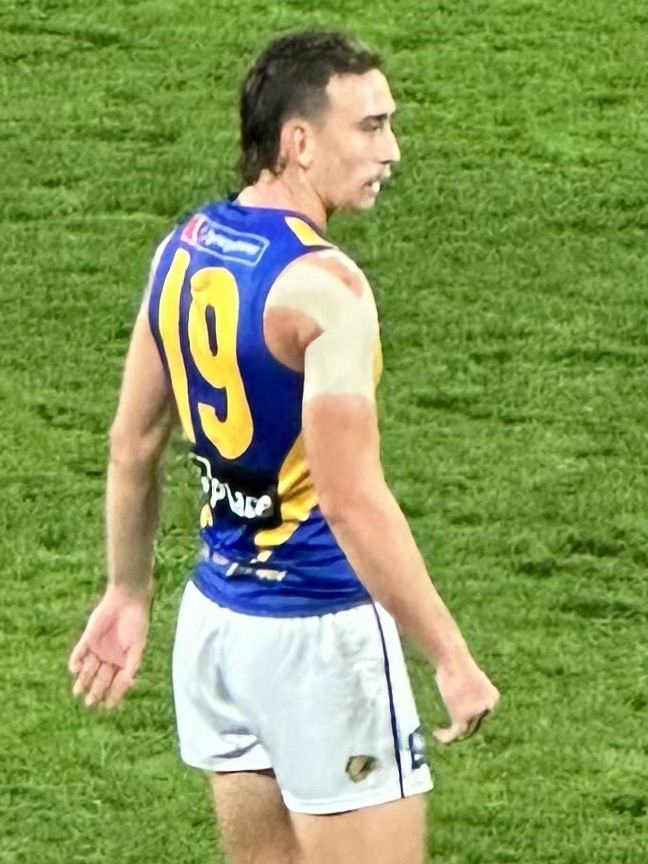
Brady Hough

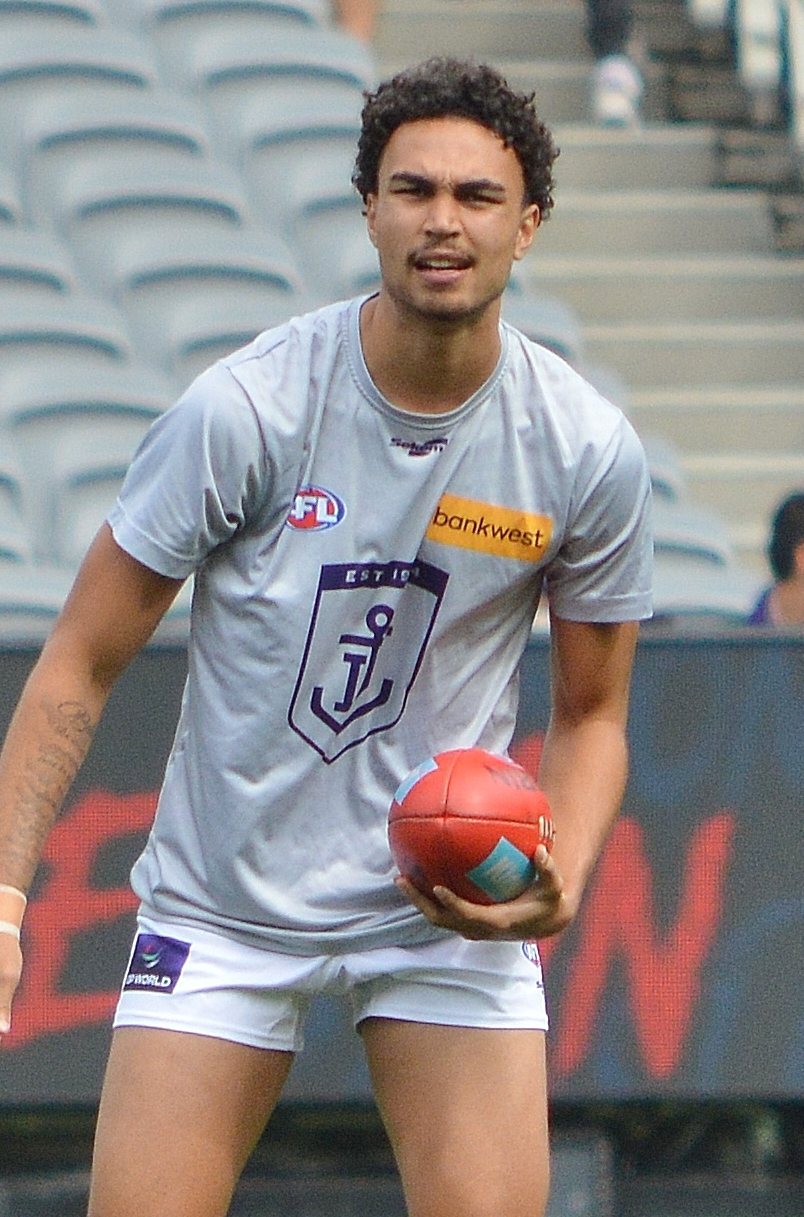
Josh Draper

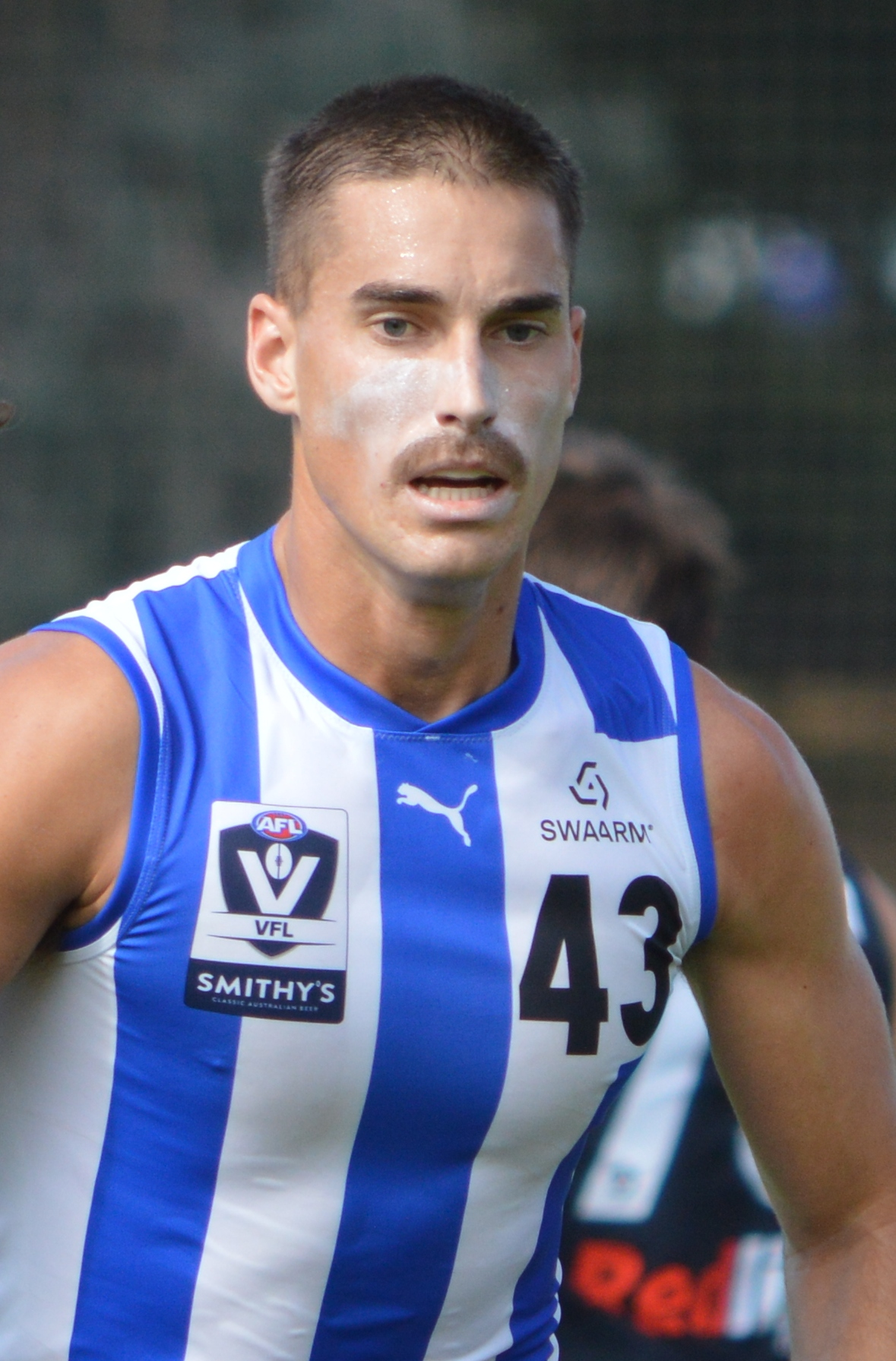
Brynn Teakle is from Northampton

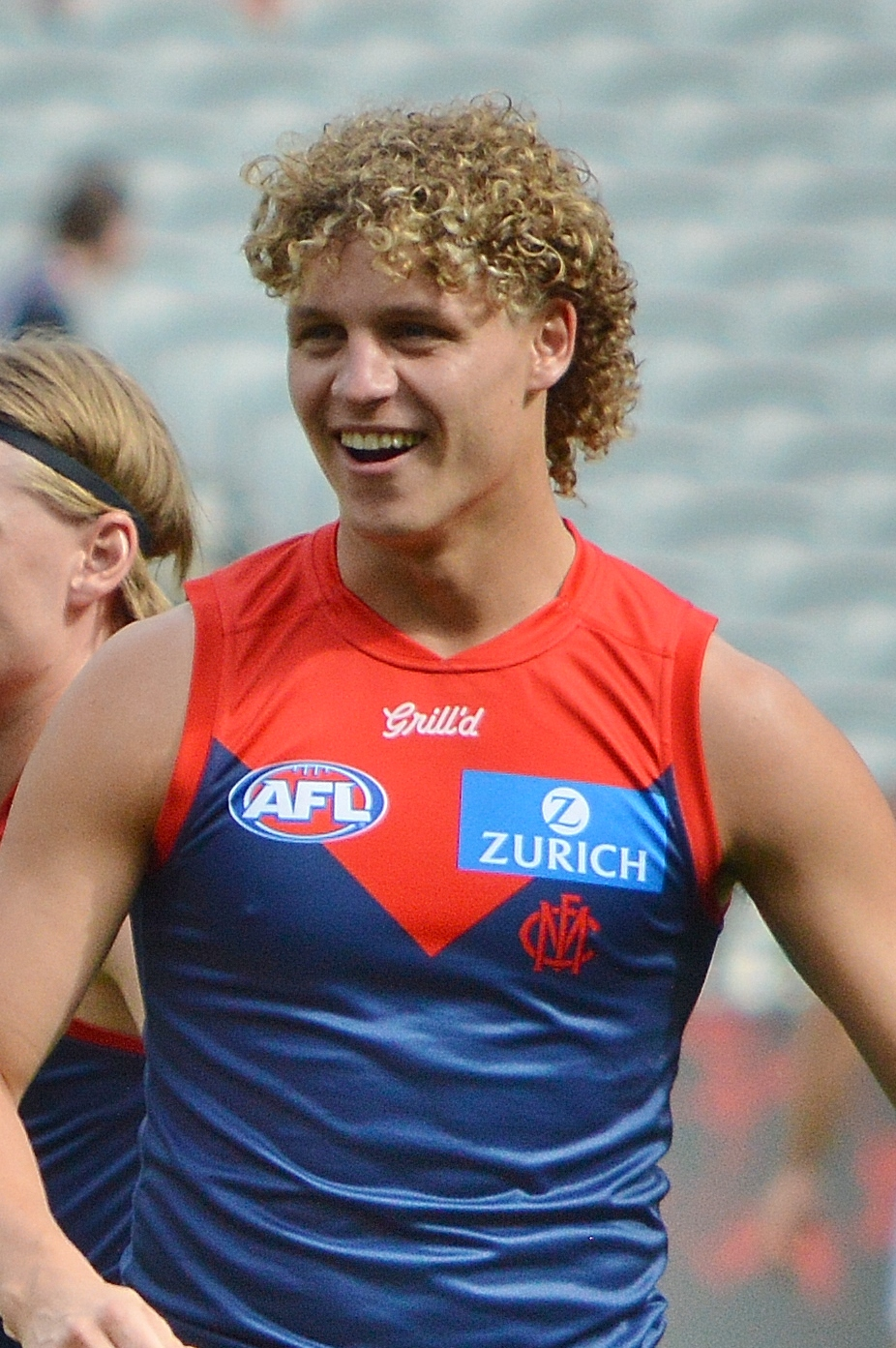
Koltyn Tholstrup

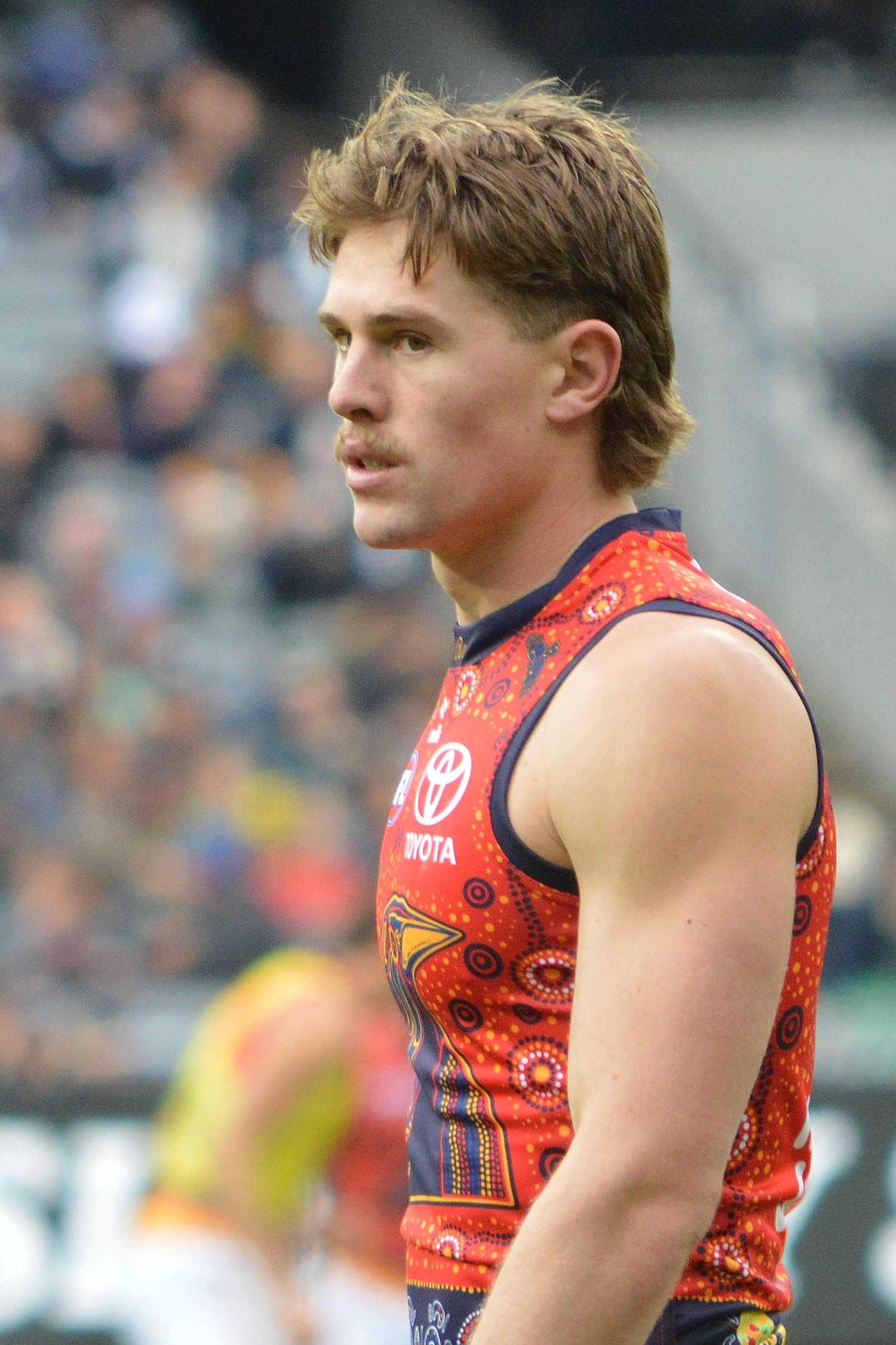
Daniel Curtin is from Perth

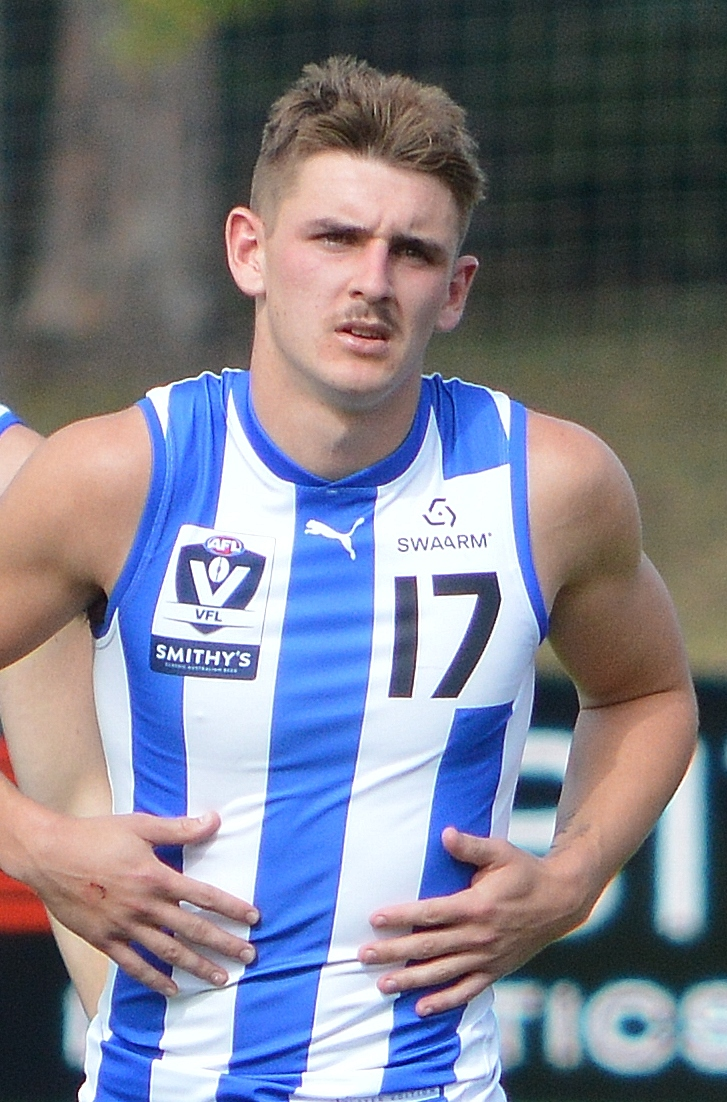
Riley Hardeman

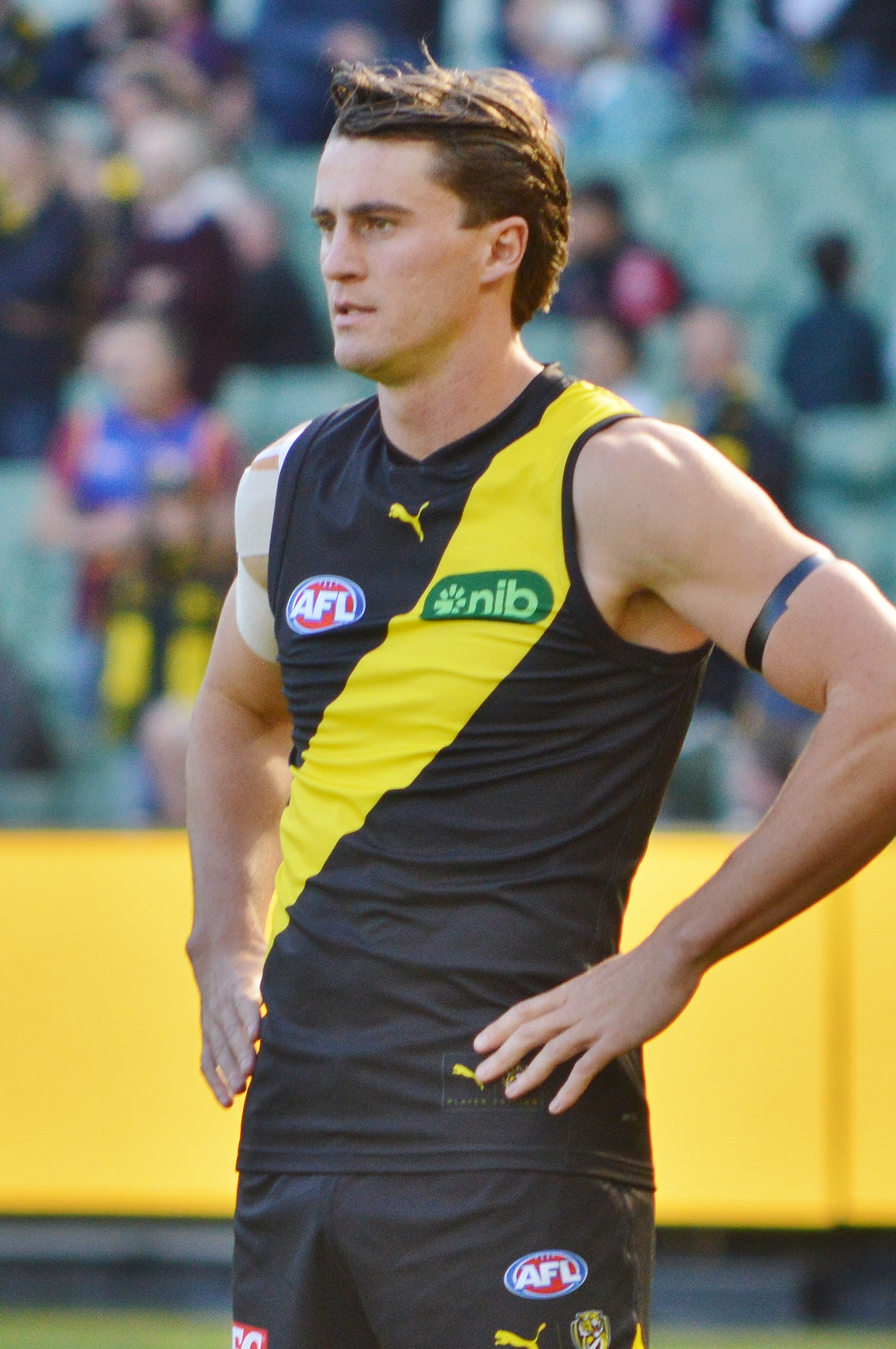
Jacob Blight is from Gnowangerup

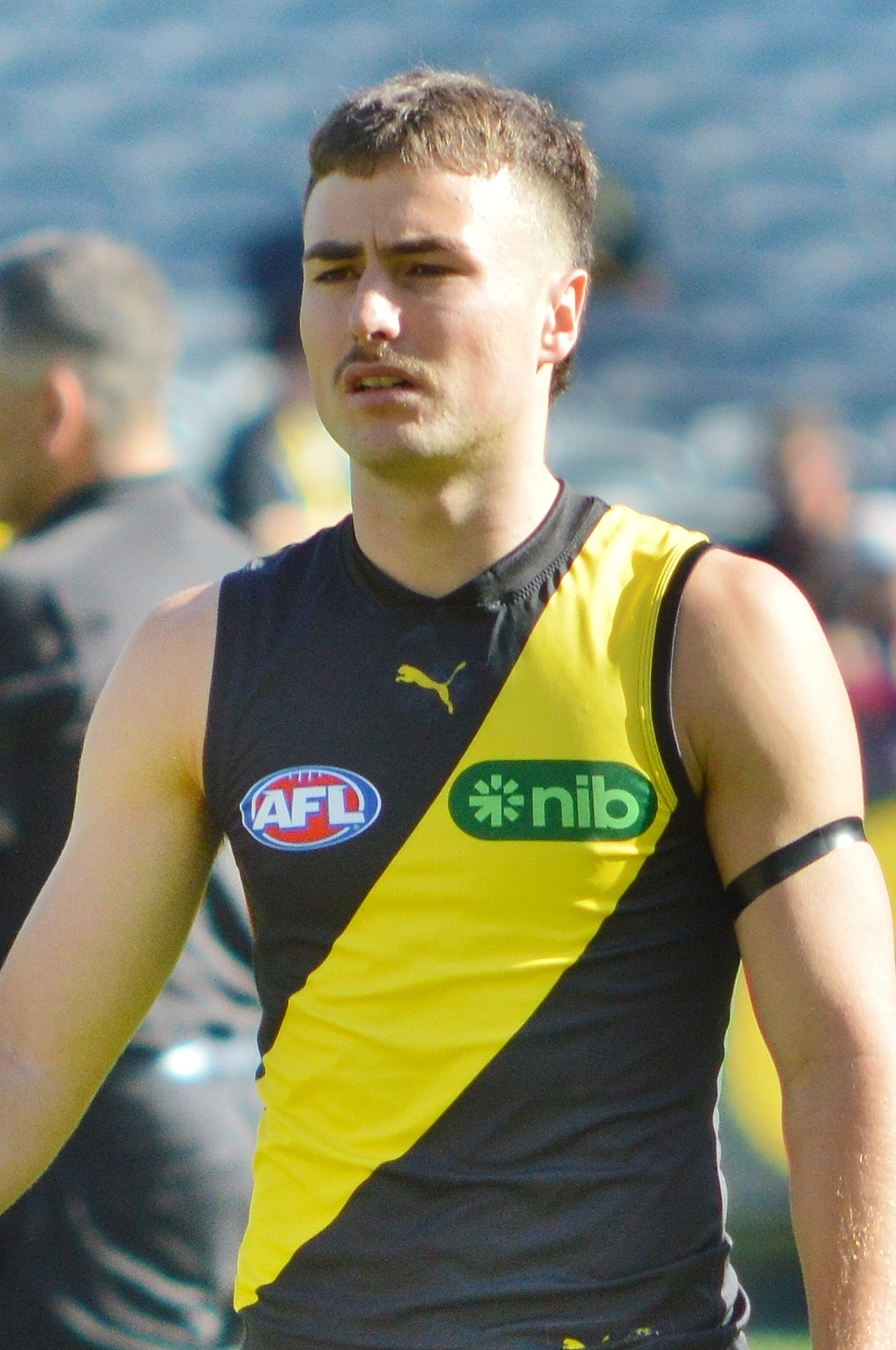
Steely Green

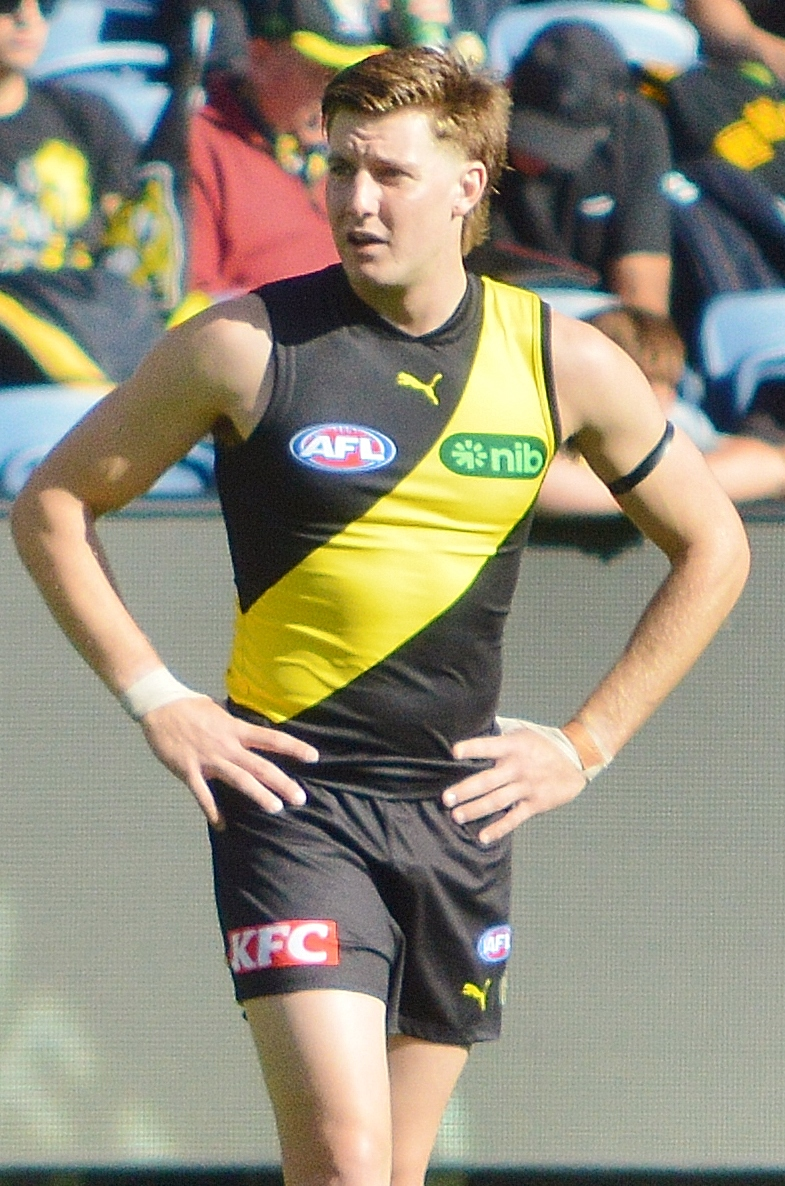
Kaleb Smith

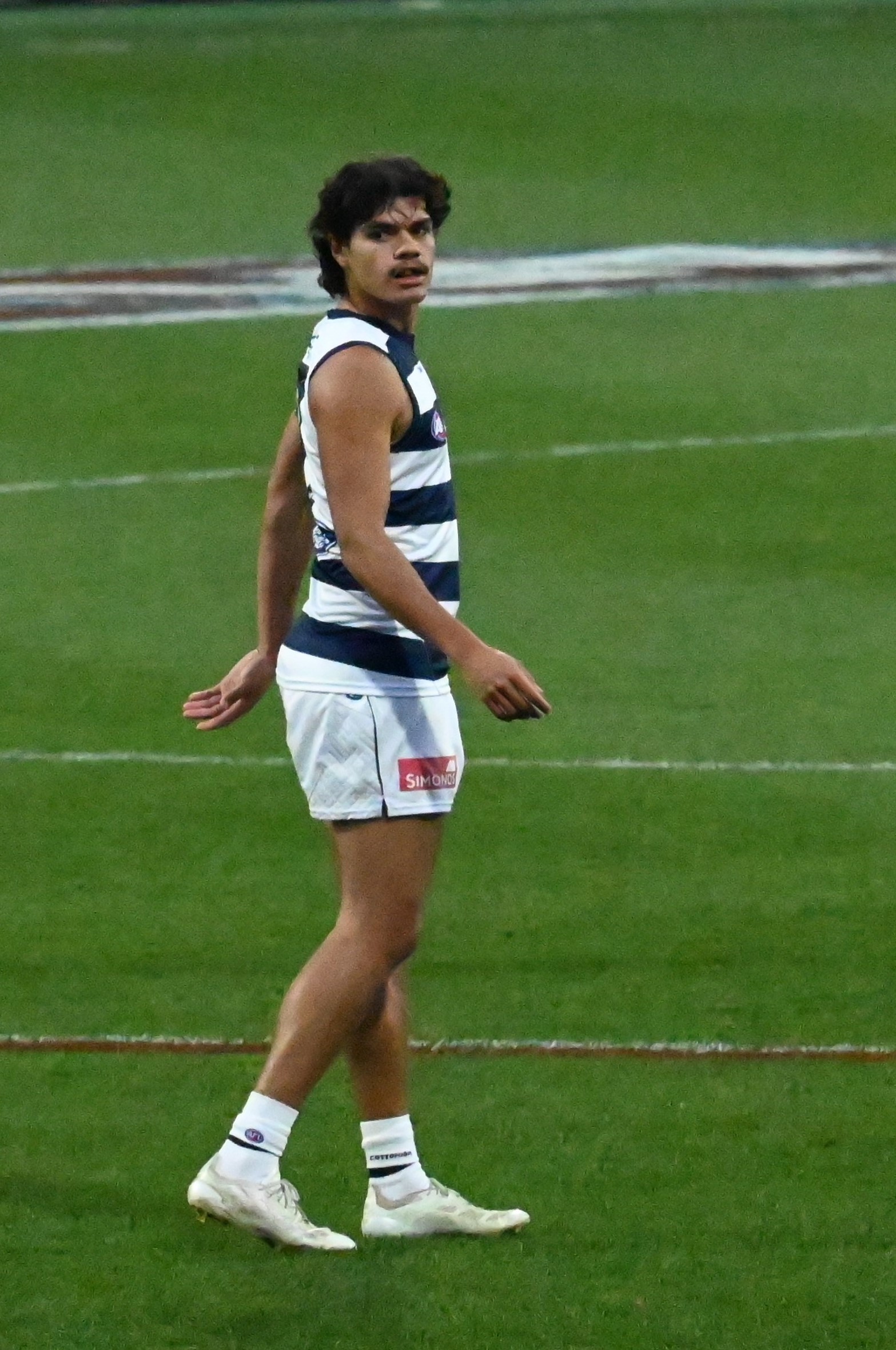
Lawson Humphries is from the Pilbara

==== AFL players from Western Australia ====
Currently on an AFL senior list

Player	WA junior/senior club/s	Representative honours	AFL Draft	Selection	AFL Years	AFL Club/s	AFL Games	AFL (Goals)	Connections to Western Australia, Notes & References
Zane Zakostelsky	North Beach Junior, Claremont		2023	#51	2026-	Brisbane Lions	-	-	Raised in Perth
William Hayes	Subiaco, Claremont		2024	#56	2025-	Collingwood	2	1	Raised in Perth
Jed Adams	South Mandurah, Peel Thunder		2022	#38	2025-	Melbourne	1	0	Raised in Mandurah
Malakai Champion	Mines Rovers, Subiaco, West Coast		2024 (rookie)	(Category B rookie)	2025-	West Coast	2	0	Raised in Kalgoorlie (Noongar, Yamatji, Kalaamaya)
Roan Steele	West Perth		2025 (mid season)	(Mid-season #8)	2025-	Collingwood	1	1	Recruited from Perth
Archer May	Subiaco	U18 (2025)	2025 (mid season)	(Mid-season #6)	2025-	Essendon	7	7	Recruited from Perth
Lachlan Blakiston	Cockburn, South Fremantle, East Fremantle		2025 (mid season)	(Mid-season #13)	2025-	Essendon	11	1	Raised in Perth
Cody Angove	Scarborough JFC, Claremont	U18 (2024)	2024	24	2025-	Greater Western Sydney	4	1	Raised in Perth
Bo Allan	Halls Head, Mandurah Catholic College, Peel Thunder, West Coast		2024	16	2025-	West Coast	6	0	Raised in Halls Head
Hugh Boxshall	Claremont, Swanbourne Tigers, Scotch College		2024	45	2025-	St Kilda	11	2	Raised in Perth
Jess Busslinger	Coolbinia, East Perth	U18 (2022)	2022	13	2025-	Western Bulldogs	7	0	Raised in Perth
Hamish Davis	Subiaco, Claremont, West Coast		2024	65	2025-	West Coast	8	1	Raised in Perth
Tom Edwards	Swan Districts		2025	SSP	2025-	Essendon	-	-	Raised in Albany
Clay Hall	Harvey Brunswick Leschenault, Peel Thunder, West Coast		2023	#38	2024-	West Coast	-	-	Raised in Perth
Jacob Blight	Peel Thunder		2024 Rookie Draft	Rookie (#2)	2024-	Richmond	1	-	Raised in Perth
Lawson Humphries	Wickham Wolves Junior, Swan Districts	Open (2026)	2023	#63	2024-	Geelong	1	-	Raised in the Pilbara (Wickham) (Nyul Nyul, Oomiday and Worrora)
Hugh Davies	Claremont U18, Peel Thunder, Fremantle	U18 (2022)	2022	#33	2024-	Fremantle	1	-	Raised in Perth
Kaleb Smith	Melville, Wesley College, East Fremantle		2022	#49	2024-	Richmond	1	-	Raised in Perth
Edward Allen	Mosman Park, Claremont	U18 (2022)	2022	#19	2024-	Collingwood	1	-	Raised in Perth
Steely Green	Brookton Pingelly, South Fremantle		2022	#55	2024-	Richmond	2	-	Raised in Perth
Riley Hardeman	Caversham JFC, Swan Districts	U18 (2022, 2023c)	2023	#23	2024-	North Melbourne	3	-	Raised in Perth
Daniel Curtin	West Coast JFC, Claremont	U18 (2022, 2023)	2023	#8	2024-	Adelaide	2	-	Raised in Perth
Darcy Jones	Kalamunda, Swan Districts	U18 (2022)	2022	#21	2024-	Greater Western Sydney	1	2	Raised in Kalamunda
Koltyn Tholstrup	Newtown Condingup, Subiaco	U18 (2022, 2023)	2023	#13	2024-	Melbourne	-	-	Raised in Esperance
Josh Draper	Peel Thunder, Fremantle	U18 (2022)	2022	Category B rookie	2024-	Fremantle	2	-	Raised in Perth
Jed Walter	-		2023	#3	2024-	Gold Coast	4	4	Born and raised in Perth
Robert Hansen Jr	Mines Rovers, Trinity College, Subiaco	U18 (2023)	2023	Rookie (mid-season) #2	2023-	North Melbourne	1	-	Raised in Kalgoorlie
Taj Woewodin	Booragoon, Aquinas College, East Fremantle		2021	#65 (Father son)	2023-	Melbourne	2	1	Raised in Perth
Jack Buller	Claremont	U18 (2019)	2023	Mid season (#13)	2023-	Sydney	1	-	Raised in Perth
Elijah Hewett	Caversham JFC, Swan Districts, West Coast	U18 (2022)	2022	#14	2023-	West Coast	12	4	Raised in Perth
Arthur Jones	Mt Barker, Wesley College, Claremont	U19 (2021)	2021	#43	2023-	Western Bulldogs	13	4	Raised in Mount Barker
Corey Warner	Willetton, Aquinas College, East Fremantle	U19 (?)	2021	#40	2023-	Sydney	1	-	Raised in Perth
Reuben Ginbey	Dunsborough, East Perth, West Coast	U18 (2022)	2022	#9	2023-	West Coast	3	-	Raised in Dunsborough
Brynn Teakle	Northampton, East Fremantle		2022	Mid season rookie (#8)	2023-	Port Adelaide	2	-	Raised in Northampton
Jack Williams	Rossmoyne, East Fremantle, West Coast		2021	#57	2022-	West Coast	9	4	Raised in Perth
Shannon Neale	Jandakot Jets, South Fremantle		2020	#33	2022-	Geelong	43	66	Raised in Perth
Brady Hough	Harvey Brunswick Leschenault, Peel Thunder, West Coast		2021	#31	2022-	West Coast	29	-	Raised in Perth
Jesse Motlop	South Coogee JFC, South Fremantle		2021	#27	2022-	Carlton	33	26	Educated in Perth
Angus Sheldrick	Mosman Park, Christ Church Grammar School, Claremont		2021	#18	2022-	Sydney	9	3	Raised in Perth
James Tunstill	Busselton, East Perth		2021	#41	2022-	Brisbane Lions	5	1	Raised in Busselton
Nic Martin	Subiaco			Rookie	2022-	Essendon	23	20	Raised in Perth
Rhett Bazzo	South Mandurah, Guildford Grammar School, Swan Districts, West Coast		2021	#37	2022-	West Coast	21	0	Raised in Perth
Callum Jamieson	North Beach Junior, Claremont, West Coast	U18 (2019)	2019	#29	2022-	West Coast	10	0	Raised in Trigg (Perth)
Jye Amiss	East Perth, Fremantle		2021	#8	2022-	Fremantle	7	10	Born and raised in Busselton
Greg Clark	Subiaco, West Coast	U18 (2015 c)	2021	#62	2022-	West Coast	6	1	Raised in Perth
Matthew Johnson	Subiaco, Fremantle		2021	#21	2022-	Fremantle	18	4	Raised in Perth
Neil Erasmus	Subiaco, Fremantle		2021	#10	2022-	Fremantle	5	1	Raised in Perth
Judd McVee	Geraldton Senior High School, East Fremantle, West Coast		2022 (rookie)	Rookie (#18)	2022-	West Coast	16	0	Raised in Geraldton
Jacob van Rooyen	Claremont		2021	#19	2022-	Melbourne	2	5	Raised in Perth
Aaron Black	Kingsley Junior, West Perth, West Coast	Open (2013-2022)			2022-	West Coast	1	1	Raised in Perth
Jake Florenca	South Coogee Junior, South Fremantle, West Coast				2022	West Coast	1	1	Raised in Perth
Ash Johnson	Claremont		2021	Mid-season (#3)	2021-2024	Collingwood	27	36	Born and raised in Halls Creek
Jaxon Prior	Sorrento-Duncraig JFC, West Perth		2019	#59	2021-2024	Brisbane Lions	39	11	Raised in Perth
Heath Chapman	Joondalup Kinross Junior, West Perth, West Coast		2020	#14	2021-	West Coast	26	1	Raised in Joondalup
Logan McDonald	Applecross Mount Pleasant Junior, Perth	U18 (2019)	2020	#4	2021-	Sydney	25	26	Born in Bunbury, raised in Perth
Denver Grainger-Barras	Kalamunda, Swan Districts		2020	#6	2021-2024	Hawthorn	28	4	Raised in Perth
Brandon Walker	East Fremantle, Fremantle		2020	#50	2021-	Fremantle	20	1	Raised in Perth
Connor West	West Perth, West Coast	U18 (2017)	2021 (mid season rookie)	Rookie (#23)	2021-	West Coast	20	1	Raised in Perth
Tyler Brockman	Wembley Downs Junior, Subiaco Colts		2020	#46	2021-	Hawthorn	15	16	Raised in Northam
Nathan O'Driscoll	Perth, Fremantle		2020	#27	2021-	Fremantle	14	10	Raised in Northam
Jack Carroll	East Fremantle				2021-	Carlton	8	2	Born and raised in Geraldton
Isiah Winder	Peel Thunder, West Coast		2020	#57	2021-	West Coast	7	5	Raised in Perth
Zane Trew	Hills Rangers Junior, Swan Districts, West Coast	U16 (2018)	2021 (Rookie)	Rookie (#12)	2021-2024	West Coast	13	4	Raised in Perth
Deven Robertson	Manning, Aquinas College, Perth	U18 (2019 c)	2019	#22	2020-	Brisbane Lions	25	7	Raised in Northam
Luke Jackson	Swan Districts, Fremantle	Open (2026)	2019	#3	2020-	Melbourne, Fremantle	57	35	Born and raised in Fremantle
Kysaiah Pickett	Quairading	Open (2026)	2019	#12	2020-	Melbourne	89	133	Raised in Quairading
Trent Rivers	Swan Districts	U18 (2018, 2019), Open (2026)	2019	#32	2020-	Melbourne	58	5	Raised in Perth
Chad Warner	Willetton Junior, East Fremantle	Open (2026)	2019	#39	2020-	Sydney	45	31	Born in Willetton
Liam Henry	Claremont, Christ Church Grammar School, Fremantle		2019	#9	2020-	Fremantle	31	13	Born in Tammin, raised in Fitzroy Crossing (Walmadjari)
Jeremy Sharp	Attadale, East Fremantle	U18 (2018, 2019)	2019	#27	2020-	Gold Coast	20	7	Born in Fremantle, raised in Attadale (Perth)
Jy Farrar	-	U18 (2018, 2019)	2019	#60	2020-	Gold Coast	11	1	Born and raised in Halls Creek (Bunuba, Jaru and Kija)
Trey Ruscoe	East Fremantle		2019	#55	2020-	Collingwood	17	7	Raised in Perth
Mitch Georgiades	Hale School, Subiaco	Open (2026)	2019	#18	2020-	Port Adelaide	49	65	Raised in Perth
Riley Garcia	Caversham JFC, Swan Districts	U18 (2018)	2019	#62	2020-	Western Bulldogs	5	2	Raised in Perth
Marlion Pickett	Puma Panthers, Manjimup Tigers, Nollamora Junior, Koongamia, York Roos, South Fremantle		2019 (mid season rookie)	Rookie (#13)	2019-2024	Richmond	91	27	Raised in Manjimup and Perth
Jordan Clark	Railways, Claremont, Fremantle	U18 (2018), Open (2026)	2018	#15	2019-	Geelong, Fremantle	54	18	Raised in Albany, Western Australia
Bobby Hill	Perth	U18 (2017, 2018)	2018	#24	2019-	Greater Western Sydney, Collingwood	102	117	Born and raised in Northam. Noongar (Whadjuk-Ballardong)
Jarrod Cameron	Newman Central, Aquinas College, Swan Districts, West Coast		2013	Next Generation Academy	2019-2021	West Coast	12	13	Raised in Newman
Jason Carter	Port Wyndham, Claremont, Fremantle		2018	Next Generation Academy	2019-2020	Fremantle	2	0	Born and raised in Wyndham
Matthew Parker	South Fremantle	Open (2021)	2018	#47	2019-	St Kilda, Richmond	30	23	Raised in Perth
Shane McAdam	Claremont		2018	Pre-draft (mature)	2019-	Adelaide	28	37	Raised in Halls Creek
Harry Edwards	Mazenod Junior, Swan Districts, West Coast		2018	#18	2019-	West Coast	28	0	Raised in Perth
Luke Foley	Sorrento-Duncraig Junior, Subiaco, West Coast		2018	#31	2019-	West Coast	22	2	Raised in Perth
Aaron Naughton	Rockingham, Peel Thunder	U18 (2017), Open (2026)	2018 (Rookie)	#9	2018-	Western Bulldogs	101	148	Raised in Rockingham
Liam Baker	Lake Grace-Pingrup, West Perth, Subiaco	U18 (2016), Open (2026)	2018 (Rookie)	Rookie (#18)	2018-	Richmond	90	29	Raised in Pingaring
Liam Ryan	Rovers, Subiaco, West Coast		2017	#26	2018-	West Coast	88	123	Raised in Geraldton (Wajarri)
Bailey Banfield	Claremont, Fremantle		2018 (Rookie)	Rookie (#5)	2018-	Fremantle	65	35	Born and raised in Broome
Tim Kelly	Palmyra, South Fremantle, West Coast		2017	#76	2018-	Geelong, West Coast	84	33	Raised in Goomalling and Perth. Noongar (Yamatji)
Matt Guelfi	Claremont	U18 (2016)	2017	#76	2018-	Essendon	84	33	Raised in Perth
Sam Taylor	Swan Districts	U18 (2016), Open (2026)	2017	#28	2018-	Greater Western Sydney	75	1	Raised in Bullsbrook and Attadale (Perth)
Brandon Starcevich	Mt Lawley-Inglewood Junior, Trinity College, East Perth	U18 (2017)	2017	#18	2018-	Brisbane Lions	71	5	Raised in Perth
Wil Powell	Claremont	Open (2026)	2018 (Rookie)	#19	2018-	Gold Coast	69	13	Raised in Perth (Scarborough)
Oscar Allen	Whitford Junior, West Perth, West Coast	U18 (2017 c)	2017	#21	2018-	West Coast	63	76	Born and raised in Perth
Ben Miller	Railways, Subiaco	U18 (2016, 2017)	2017	#63	2018-	Richmond	13	3	Raised in Kalgoorlie
Zac Langdon	Dampier, Claremont, West Coast		2017	#56	2018-2022	Greater Western Sydney, West Coast	13	3	Born and raised in Karratha
Sam Petrevski-Seton	Halls Creek, Claremont, West Coast	U16, U18 (2015)	2016	#6	2017-	Carlton, West Coast	111	22	Raised in Fitzroy Crossing and Halls Creek
Shai Bolton	South Fremantle	U18 (2016), Open (2026)	2016	#29	2017-	Richmond	93	103	Born in Katanning, raised in Forrestdale (Perth) and Mandurah. Noongar (Mineng, Wiilman)
Sam Powell-Pepper	East Perth		2016	#18	2017-	Port Adelaide	93	51	Born in Western Australia, raised in Perth
Cameron Zurhaar	East Fremantle, Wesley College		2017	#11	2017-	North Melbourne	84	115	Raised in Perth
Griffin Logue	Swan Districts, Fremantle		2016	#8	2017-	Fremantle, North Melbourne	67	9	Raised in Perth
Darcy Cameron	North Albany, Claremont	Open (2026)	2016	#48	2017-	Sydney, Collingwood	56	46	Raised in Albany, Western Australia
Tim English	South Fremantle	Open (2026)	2016	#19	2017-	Western Bulldogs	77	41	Born and raised in Dunsborough
Zac Fisher	York, Perth	U18 (2016)	2016	#27	2017-	Carlton	95	49	Born and raised in York
Jake Waterman	Marist, Claremont, West Coast	U18 (2016c), Open (2026)	2016	#77 (Father son)	2017-	West Coast	75	73	Born and raised in Perth
Willie Rioli	South Fremantle, West Coast		2016	#52	2017-2025	West Coast	109	151	Schooled in Perth
Josh Rotham	West Perth, West Coast		2016	#37	2017-2024	West Coast	72	2	Raised in Perth
Quinton Narkle	Perth, Wesley College		2016	#60	2017-2024	Geelong, Port Adelaide	59	27	Raised in Perth (Whadjuk, Ballardong)
Cedric Cox	Halls Creek		2016	#24	2017-2020	Brisbane Lions	13	3	Raised in Halls Creek
Daniel Rioli	-		2015	#15	2016-	Richmond	140	99	Born Fremantle
Sam Menegola	East Fremantle		2011 (Rookie)	Rookie (#11)	2016-	Geelong	116	81	Born and raised in Perth
Callum Ah Chee	South Fremantle	Open (2026)	2015	#8	2016-	Gold Coast, Brisbane Lions	105	42	Born in Derby raised in Perth
Nathan Broad	Chittering Broncos Junior, Upper Swan Junior, Swan Districts	Open (2026)	2015	#27	2016-2026	Richmond	191	4	Born and raised in Wubin
Marcus Adams	West Perth		2015	#35	2016-2023	Western Bulldogs, Brisbane Lions	73	5	Raised in Perth
Mitch McGovern	North Albany, Claremont		2014	#43	2016-	Adelaide, Carlton	92	104	Raised in Albany
Tom Barrass	Scarborough Junior, Claremont, West Coast	U18 (2013), Open (2026)	2013	#43	2015-	West Coast	115	1	Raised in Perth
Joel Hamling	Cable Beach, Claremont , Fremantle		2011	#31	2015-2024	Western Bulldogs, Fremantle	91	0	Born in Denmark, Western Australia, raised in Broome
Connor Blakely	Bunbury, Swan Districts, Fremantle	U18 (2014)	2014	#34	2015-	Fremantle, Carlton	78	3	Raised in Bunbury
Ethan Hughes	Harvey Brunswick Leschenault, Swan Districts, Fremantle		2015 (Rookie)	Rookie (#15)	2015-2024	Fremantle	107	6	Raised in Bunbury
Billy Frampton	East Fremantle, South Fremantle		2014	#84	2015-	Port Adelaide, Adelaide, Collingwood	27	12	Raised in Perth
Charlie Cameron	Swan Districts		2013 (Rookie)	Rookie (#7)	2014-	Adelaide, Brisbane Lions	229	404	Raised in Newman
Angus Brayshaw	-		2014	#3	2014-2023	Melbourne	146	47	Born in Western Australia
Cam McCarthy	South Coogee, South Fremantle, Fremantle	U18 (2013)	2013	#14	2014-2020	Greater Western Sydney, Fremantle	70	99	Born in Western Australia
Patrick Cripps	Northampton, East Fremantle	U18 (2013 vc), Open (2026c)	2013	#13	2014-	Carlton	207	113	Born and raised in Perth
Dom Sheed	Mines Rovers, Subiaco, West Coast	U18 (2013 c)	2013	#11	2014-	West Coast	165	69	Born and raised in Kalgoorlie
Rory Lobb	Swan Districts, Fremantle	Open (2026)	2013	#29	2014-	Greater Western Sydney, Fremantle, Western Bulldogs	143	146	Born and raised in Perth
Jack Martin	Towns, Swan Districts		2011 (mini-draft)	#1	2014-2024	Gold Coast, Carlton	151	133	Born in Broome, raised in Broome and Geraldton (Yawuru, Yamatji)
Blake Acres	Edgewater Woodvale, West Perth, Wanneroo		2013	#19	2014-	St Kilda, Fremantle, Carlton	121	37	Raised in Perth (Joondalup)
Jesse Hogan	Marist Junior, Swan Districts, Fremantle	U18 (2012), Open (2026)	2012 (mini-draft)	#2	2014-	Melbourne, Fremantle, Greater Western Sydney	117	225	Born and raised in Perth (Scarborough)
Kamdyn McIntosh	Pinjarra, Peel Thunder	U16 (2010), U18 (2012)	2012	#13	2013-	Richmond	190	54	Born and raised in Pinjarra
Jaeger O'Meara	Dongara Junior, Railways, Perth, Fremantle	U18 (2011), Open (2026)	2011 (mini-draft)	#1	2013-	Gold Coast, Hawthorn, Fremantle	146	72	Born in Perth and raised in Dongara
Bradley Hill	Quinns Junior, West Perth, Fremantle	U18 (2011 c), Open (2026)	2011	#33	2012-	Hawthorn, Fremantle, St Kilda	255	103	Raised in Perth (Joondalup)
Stephen Coniglio	Upper Swan Junior, Swan Districts	U18 (2011 c), Open (2026)	2011	#3	2012-	Greater Western Sydney	217	120	Born and raised in Perth (Joondalup)
Tom Mitchell	Hale School		2011	#21 (F/S)	2012-	Sydney, Hawthorn, Collingwood	203	84	Attended Hale School in Perth
Elliot Yeo	Booragoon Junior, East Fremantle, West Coast	U18 (2011)	2011	#30	2012-	Brisbane Lions, West Coast	212	85	Born and raised in Perth
Jason Johannisen	East Fremantle		2011	#39	2012-2026	Western Bulldogs	212	77	Raised in Perth
Jamie Elliot	-			Pre-list (2011 GWS)	2012-	Western Bulldogs	218	343	Raised in Dongara
Nathan Wilson	Mandurah Centrals, Peel Thunder		2011	Underage selection	2012-2023	Greater Western Sydney, Fremantle	155	18	Raised in Mandurah
Jack Darling	Sorrento-Duncraig, West Perth, West Coast	U18 (2009)	2010	#26	2011-	West Coast, North Melbourne	342	592	Raised in Perth
Jamie Cripps	Northampton, East Fremantle	U18 (2010)	2010	#24	2011-2026	St Kilda, West Coast	277	339	Born in Perth, raised in Northampton
David Swallow	Rossmoyne Junior	U16 (2003c), U18 (2005c)	2010	#1	2011-2025	Gold Coast	249	111	Born and raised in Perth
Jeremy McGovern	North Albany, Claremont, West Coast		2011 (Rookie)	Rookie (#44)	2011-2025	West Coast	197	38	Born in Western Australia, raised in Warburton, Kalgoorlie and Albany
Harley Bennell	Pinjarra, Peel Thunder		2010	#2	2011-2020	Gold Coast	88	98	Raised in Pinjarra
Blaine Boekhorst	Swan Districts		2014	#19	2011-2017	Carlton	25	15	Raised in Port Hedland
Mitch Duncan	Trinity College, East Perth	U16 (2007 c), U18 (2008, 2009 vc)	2009	#28	2010-	Geelong	305	185	Born and raised in Perth
Travis Colyer	Trinity College, Claremont	U18 (2009)	2009	#26	2010-2023	Essendon, Fremantle	146	86	Raised in Perth
Nat Fyfe	Claremont, Fremantle	U18 (2019)	2009	#20	2010-2025	Fremantle	248	178	Born and raised in Lake Grace
Brad Sheppard	East Fremantle, West Coast	U18 (2008, 2009)	2009	#7	2010-2021	West Coast	216	19	Born and raised in Perth
Nic Naitanui	Midvale Junior, Governor Stirling Senior HS, Swan Districts, West Coast	U18 (2007, 2008)	2008	#2	2009-2023	West Coast	213	112	Raised in Perth (Midvale)
Michael Walters	Swan Districts, Fremantle	U18 (2008)	2008	#53	2009-2025	Fremantle	239	365	Raised in Perth. Noongar
Daniel Rich	Sorrento-Duncraig, Subiaco	U18 (2007, 2008)	2008	#7	2009-2023	Brisbane Lions	270	115	Born and raised in Perth
Matt Priddis	Sorrento-Duncraig, Subiaco	U16 (2004), U18 (2005)	2006 (Rookie)	Rookie (#13)	2006-2017	West Coast	240	73	Raised in Manjimup
Lance Franklin	Perth	U18 (2014)	2004	#5	2005-2023	Hawthorn, Sydney	354	1066	Born in Perth, raised in Dowerin and Perth. Noongar (Whadjuk)
Brad Walsh	Rockingham Rams, Kolbe Catholic College, Peel Thunder	U18 (2014c)	2015	Rookie (#24)	2015	Carlton	3	1	Raised in Rockingham
Peter Sumich	Cockburn JFC, South Fremantle	U18 (1985), Open (1988–1993)			1986-1997	West Coast	150	514	Raised in Perth
Jon Dorotich	South Fremantle	Open (1984, 1987, 1992)			1986-1993	Carlton	132	103	Raised in Perth
Leon Baker	Swan Districts	Open (1984, 1985, 1986)			1984-1988	Essendon	86	70	Recruited from Perth
Dean Turner	East Perth, West Coast				1984-1990	Fitzroy, West Coast	110	47	Raised in and recruited from Perth
Wayne Blackwell	Claremont	Open (1982-1986)			1984-1990	Carlton	110	80	Raised in and recruited from Perth
Phil Krakouer	North Mt Barker, Claremont				1982-1991	North Melbourne, Footscray	148	231	Raised in and recruited from Mount Barker
Jim Krakouer	North Mt Barker, Claremont				1982-1991	North Melbourne, St Kilda	147	236	Raised in and recruited from Mount Barker
Billy Duckworth	West Perth	Open (1987)			1982-1990	Hawthorn	126	64	Raised in Perth
Gary Buckenara	TTC Churchlands, Subiaco	Open (1982-1989)			1982-1990	Hawthorn	154	293	Raised in Perth
Alan Johnson	Perth	Open (1982-1989)			1982-1990	Melbourne	135	95	Born and raised in East Fremantle
Billy Duckworth	West Perth				1982-1990	Essendon	126	64	Raised in Perth
Simon Beasley	University, Swan Districts	Open (1981-1985)			1982-1989	Footscray	154	575	Raised in Perth
Craig Holden	Swan Districts	Open (1981, 1984, 1985, 1987)			1982-1988	North Melbourne, Sydney	109	24	Born in Western Australia, raised in Perth
Allan Montgomery	Perth				1982-1985	Carlton	33	6	Raised in Perth
Ross Ditchburn	Claremont, Kukerin		1981	#12	1982-1985	Carlton	28	91	Raised in Kukerin
Steve Malaxos	Claremont, East Fremantle, West Coast	Open (1982–1992)			1985-1990	Hawthorn, West Coast	75	45	Raised in Perth
Wayne Otway	Swan Districts, East Perth				1982-1983	Essendon	36	65	Raised in Perth
Gerard Neesham	Fremantle CBC Amateurs, East Fremantle, Swan Districts				1982	Sydney	9	1	Raised in Perth
Steve Hargrave	Perth				1982	Footscray	2	0	Raised in Perth
Brian Taylor	Subiaco				1980-1990	Richmond, Collingwood	140	527	Raised in Mandurah
Garry Sidebottom	Swan Districts				1978-1984	St Kilda, Geelong, Fitzroy	104	145	Born and raised in Western Australia (Perth)
Harry Morgan	Cottesloe, Subiaco	Open (1910)			1914-1918	South Melbourne, Footscray, Carlton	86	191	Raised in Perth

=== Women's ===
Fremantle was the first professional women's team in the state in 2017, therefore the majority of the professional players have played there, the West Coast women's team was not awarded a license until 2020. Due to the large distance to the eastern states, most West Australian female players are drafted to one of these two teams.

==== Current Players ====
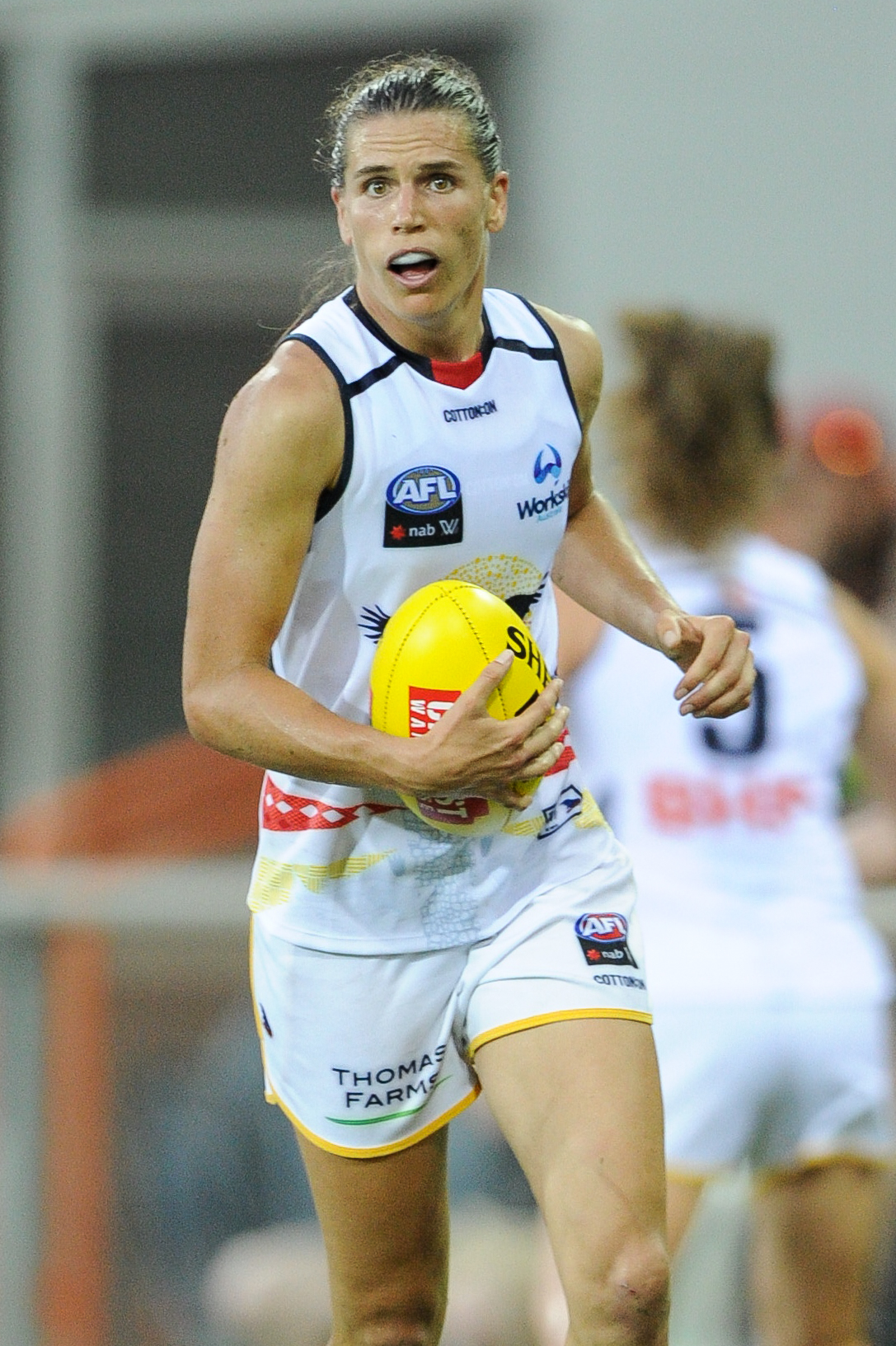
Chelsea Randall is from Rockingham

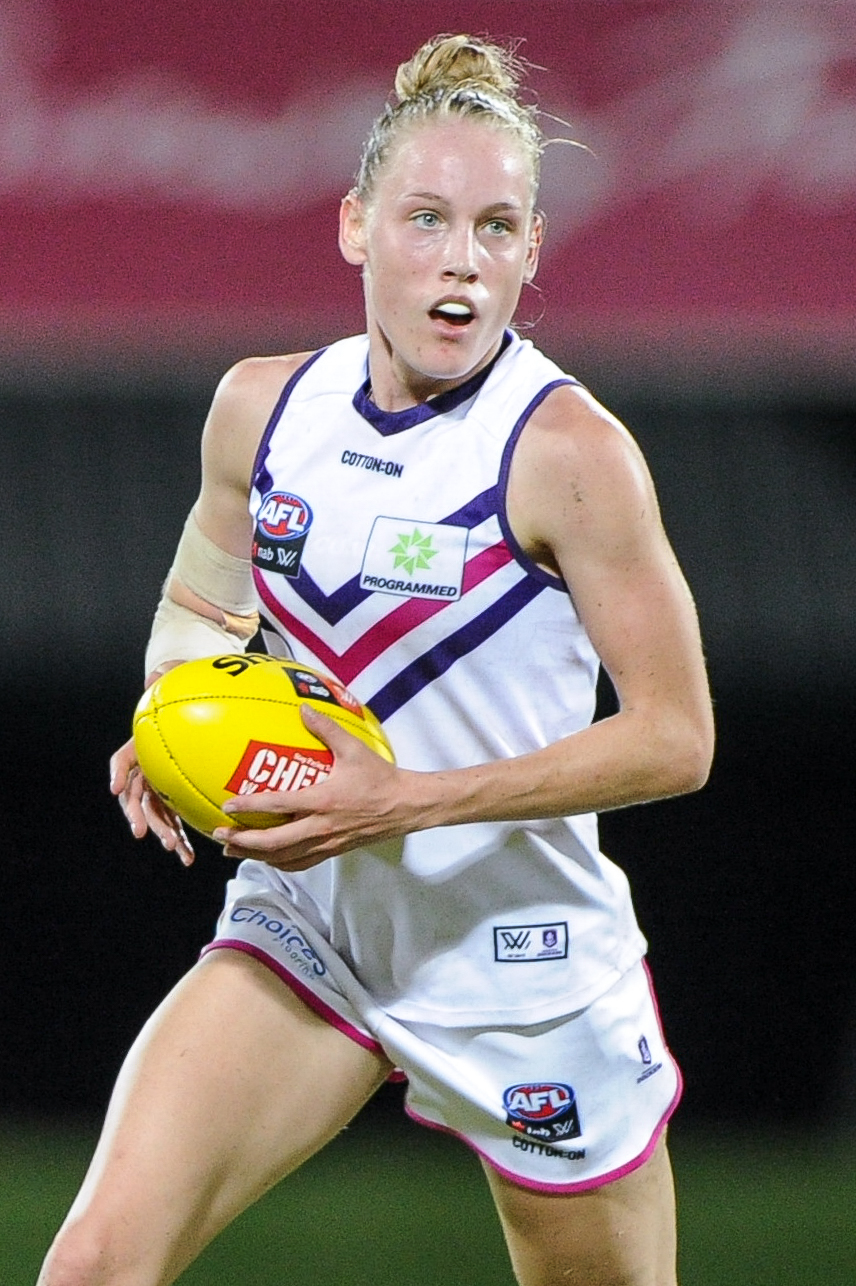
Stephanie Cain in 2018

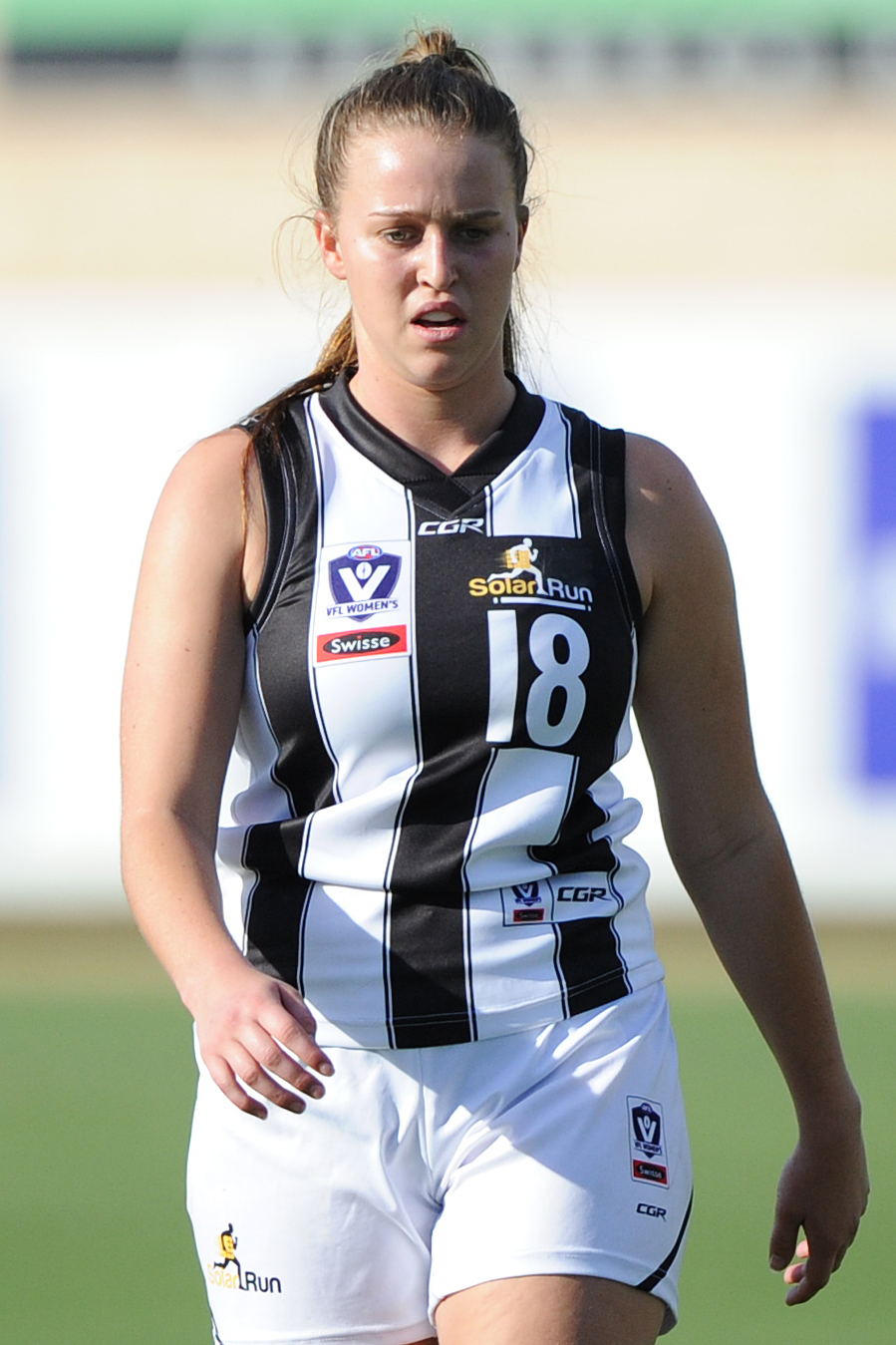
Ruby Schleicher in 2018

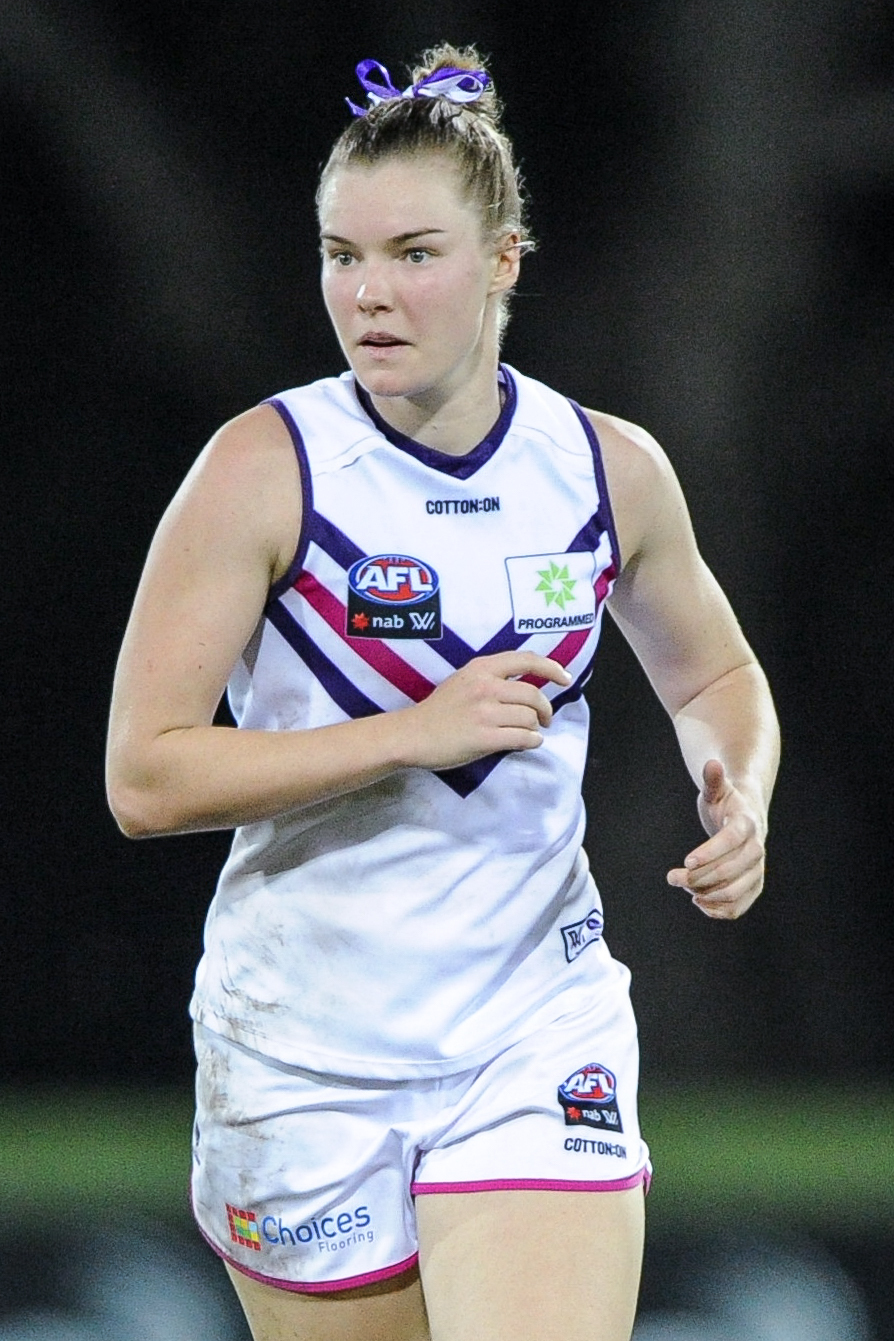
Hayley Miller is from Perth

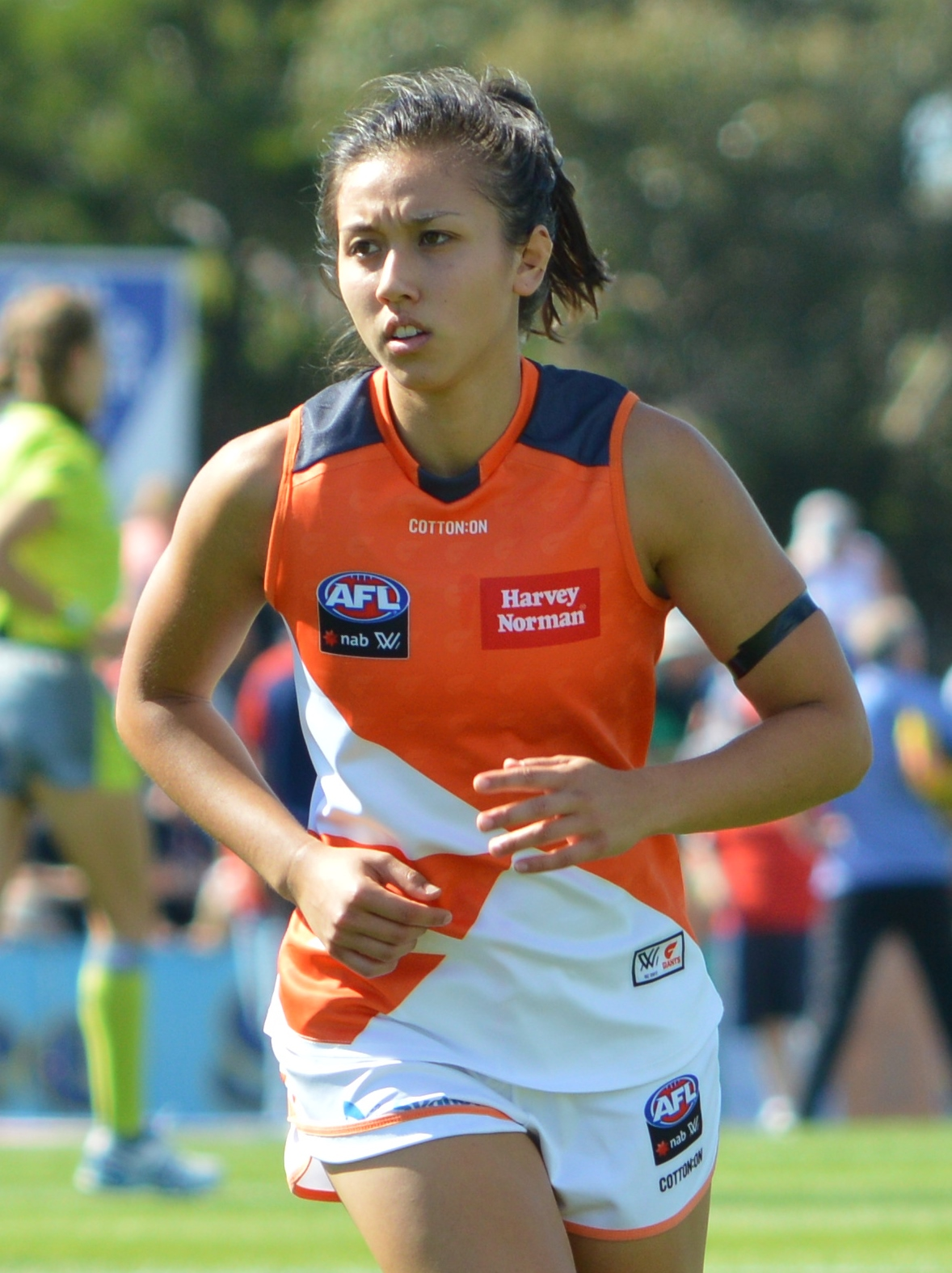
Rebecca Beeson in 2018

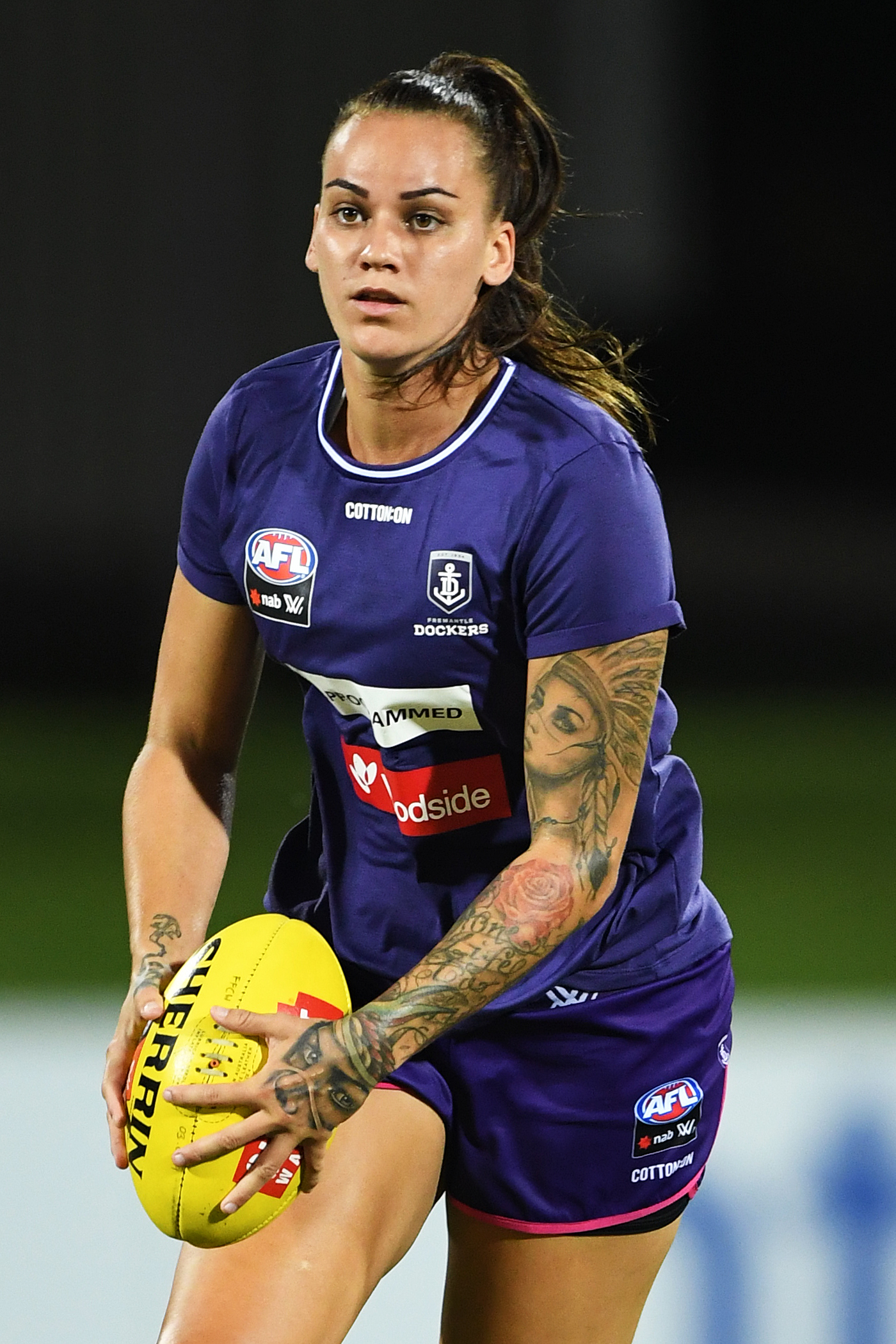
Gemma Houghton in 2019

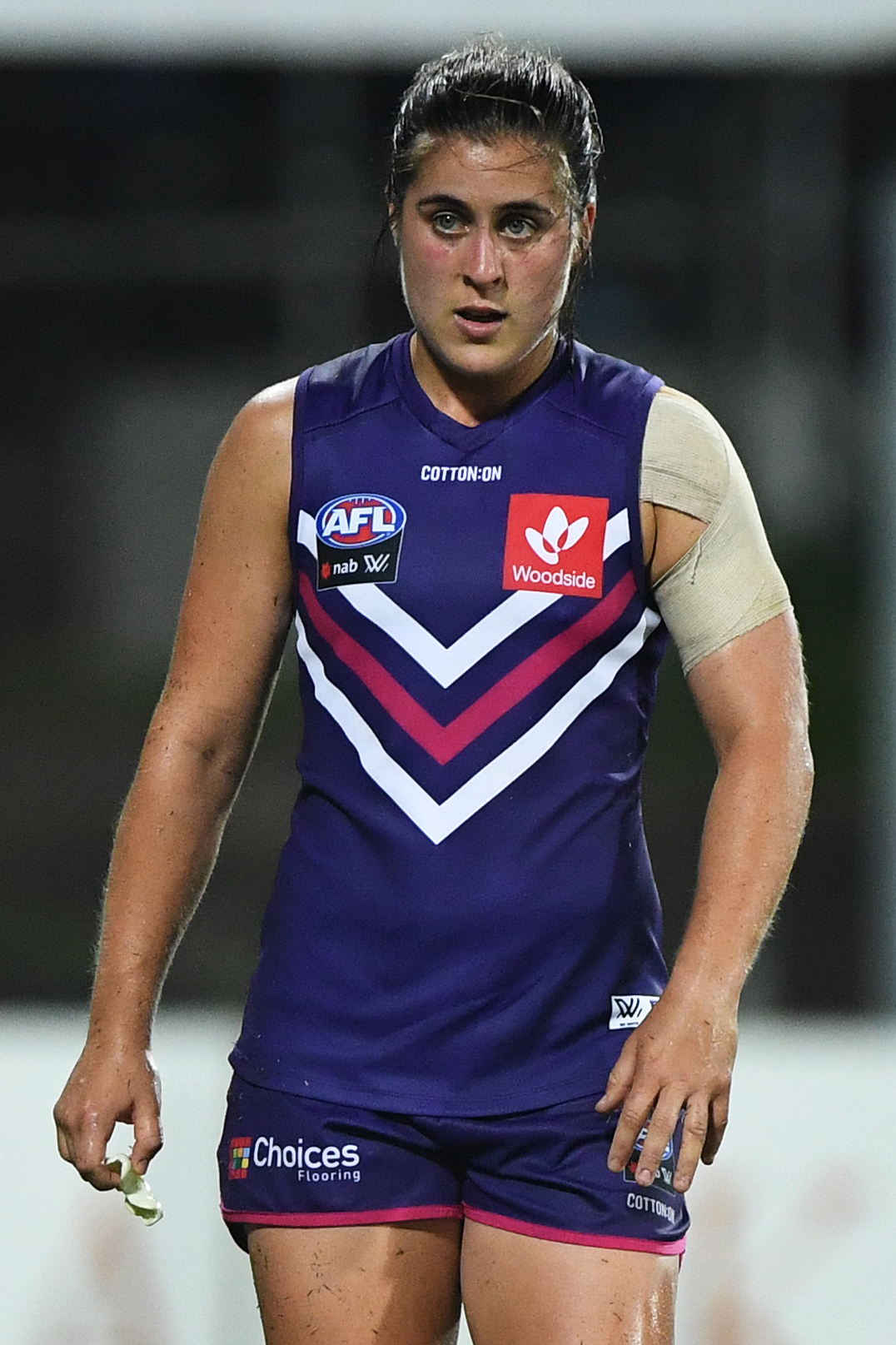
Gabby O'Sullivan in 2019

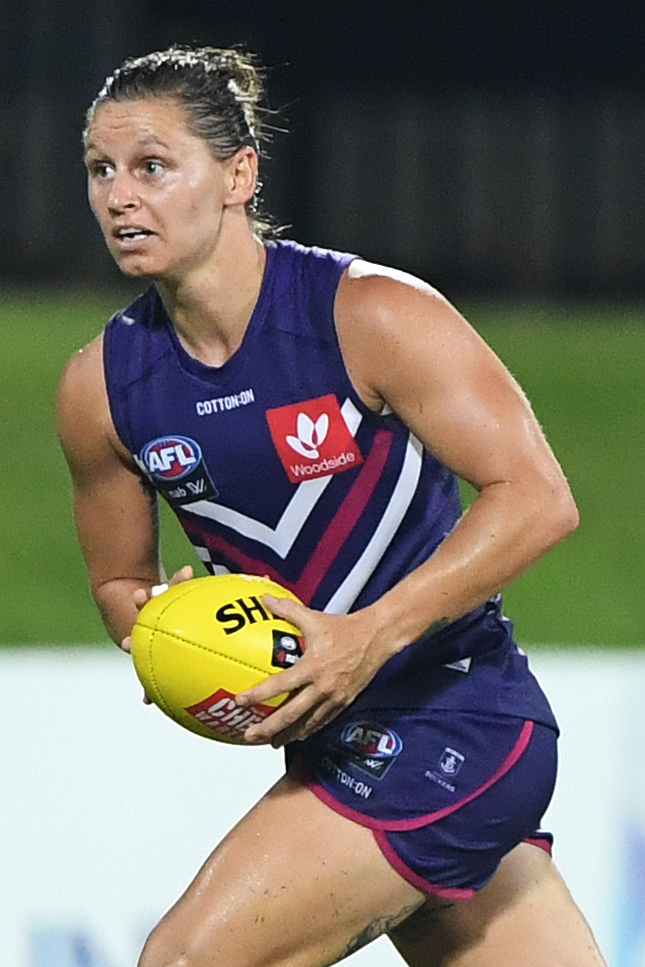
Kiara Bowers in 2019

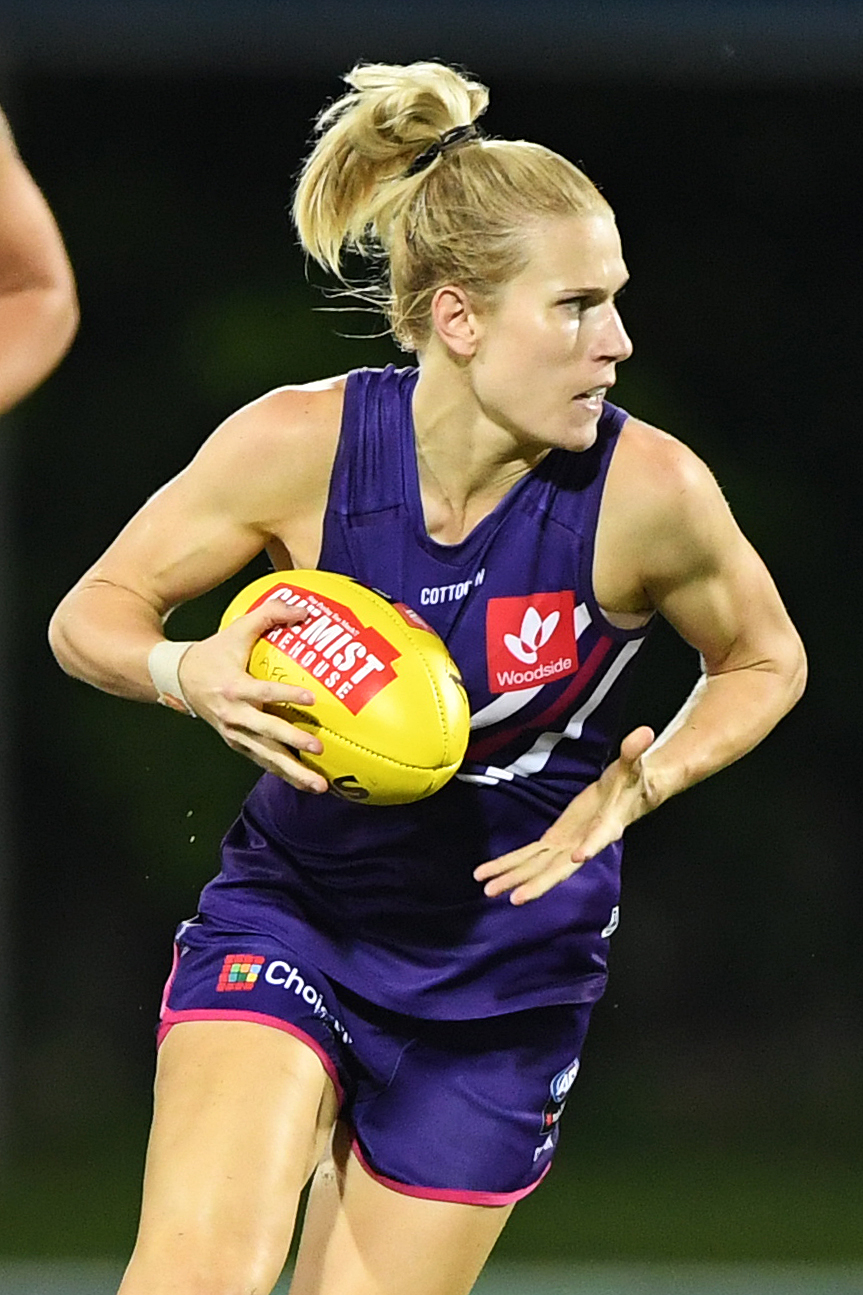
Dana Hooker in 2019

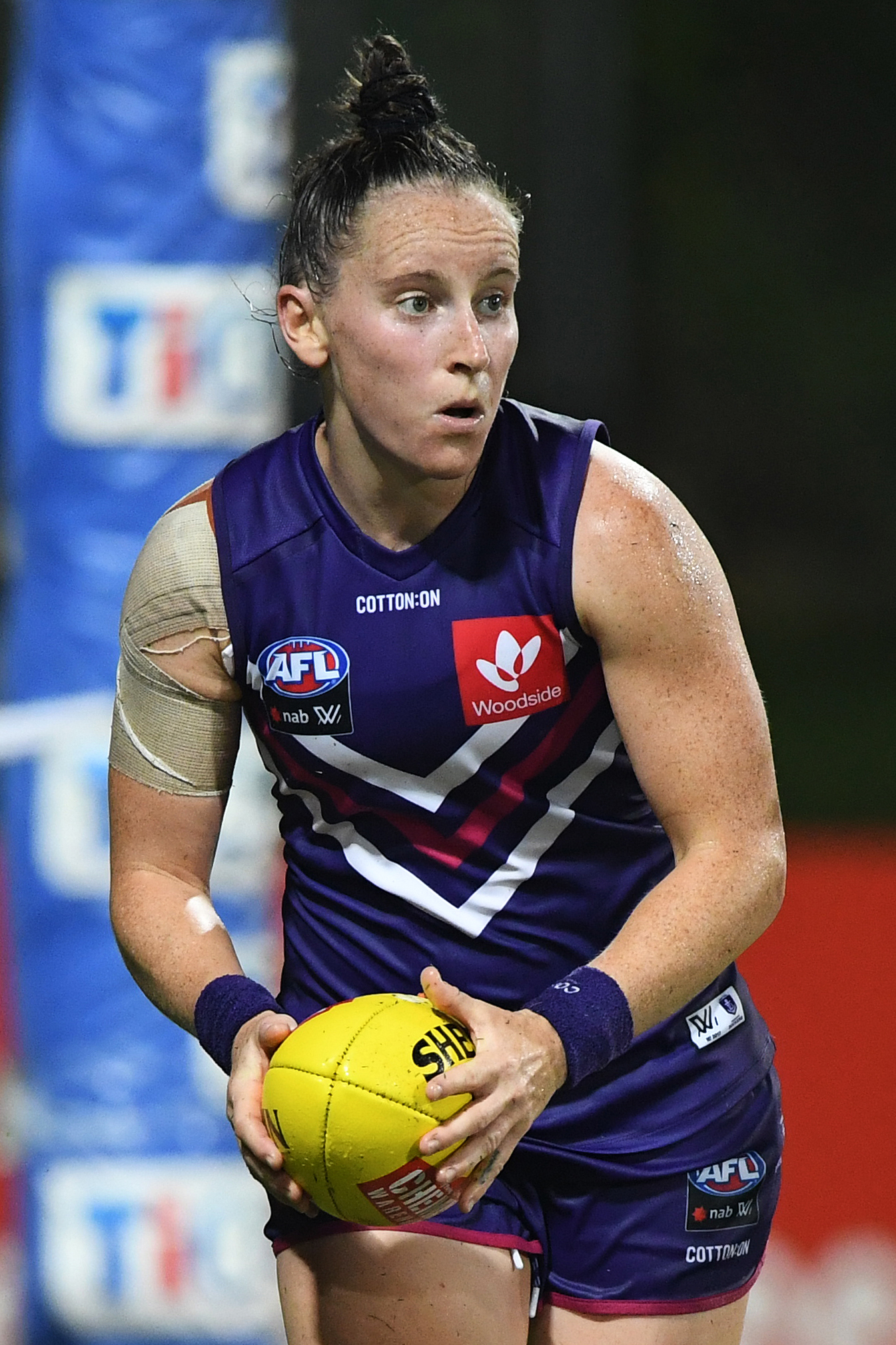
Kara Antonio in 2019

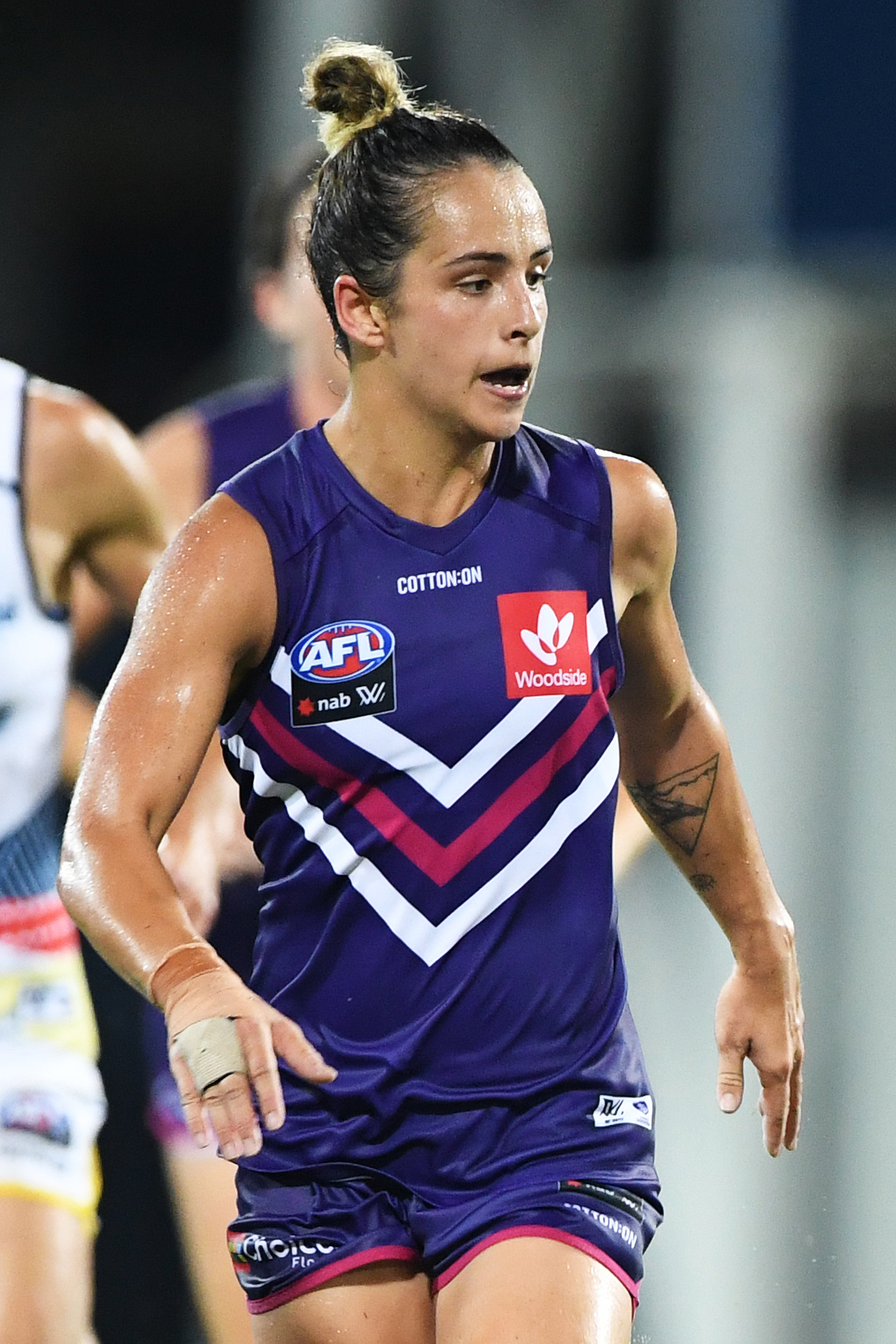
Angelique Stannett in 2019

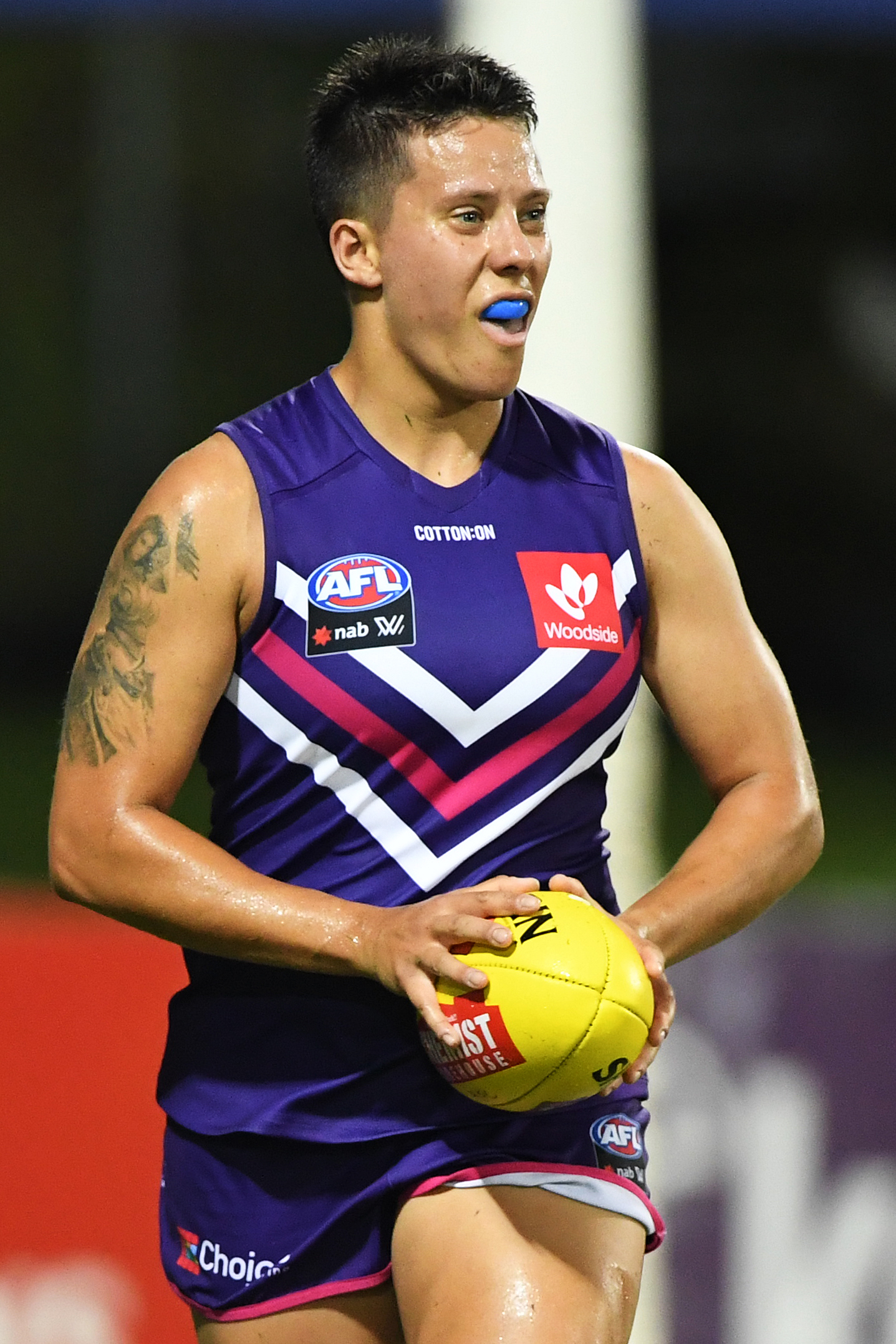
Evangeline Gooch in 2019

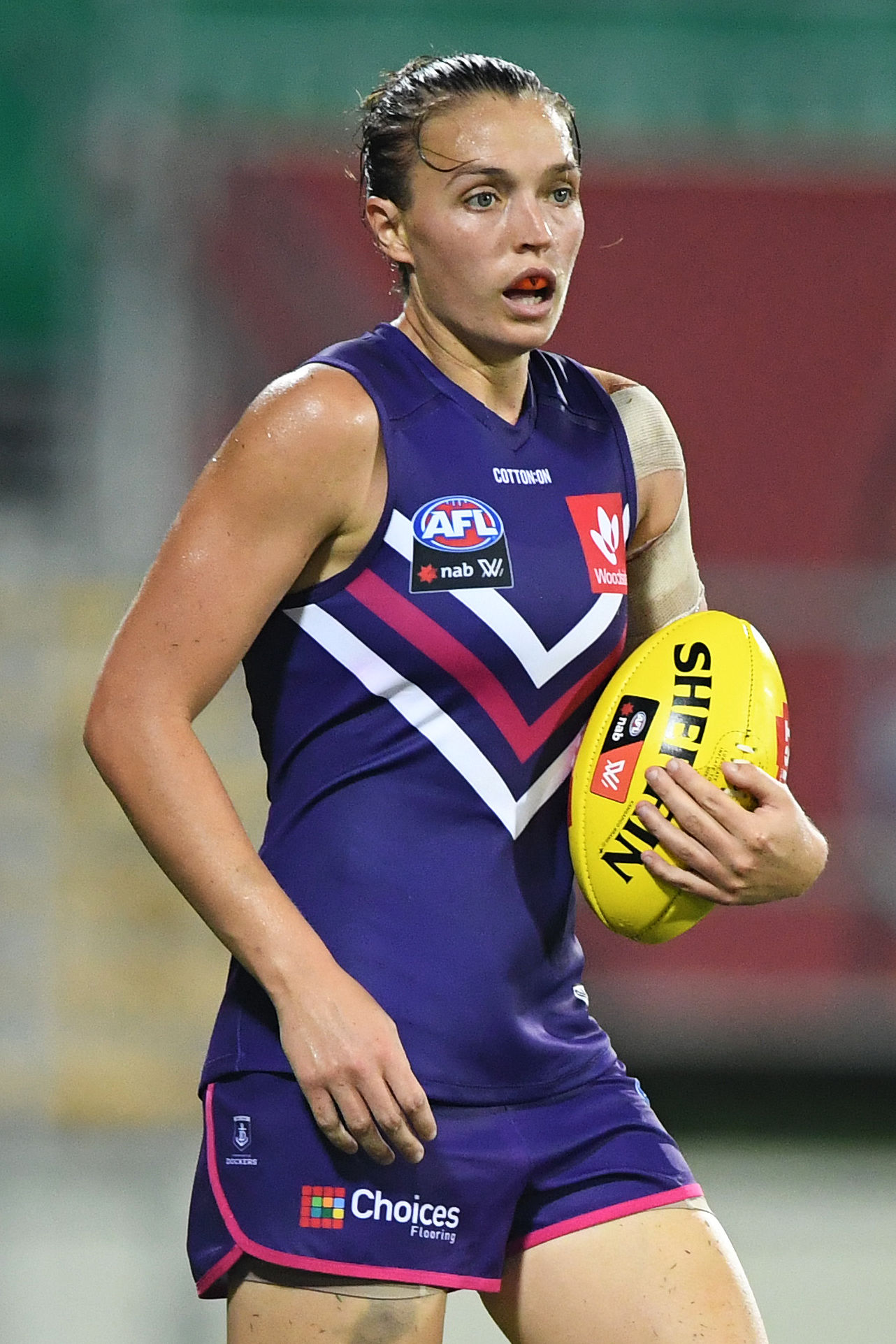
Ebony Antonio in 2019

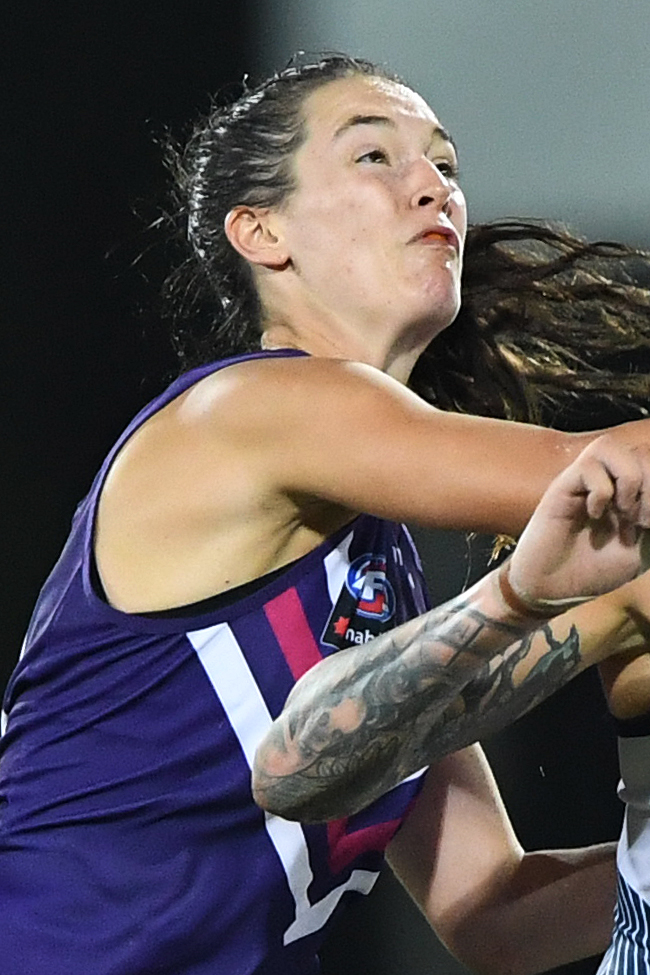
Philipa Seth in 2019

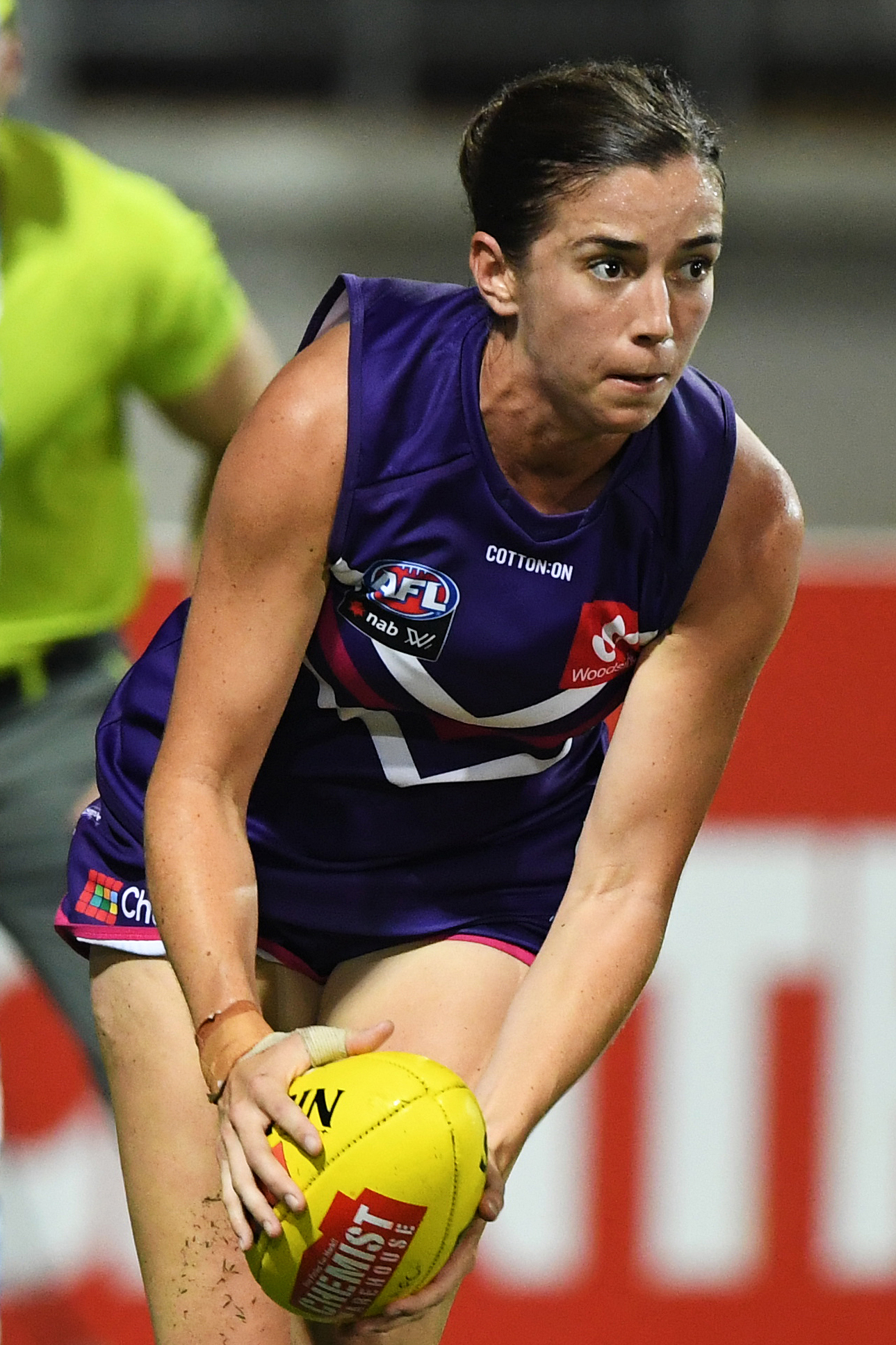
Laura Pugh in 2019

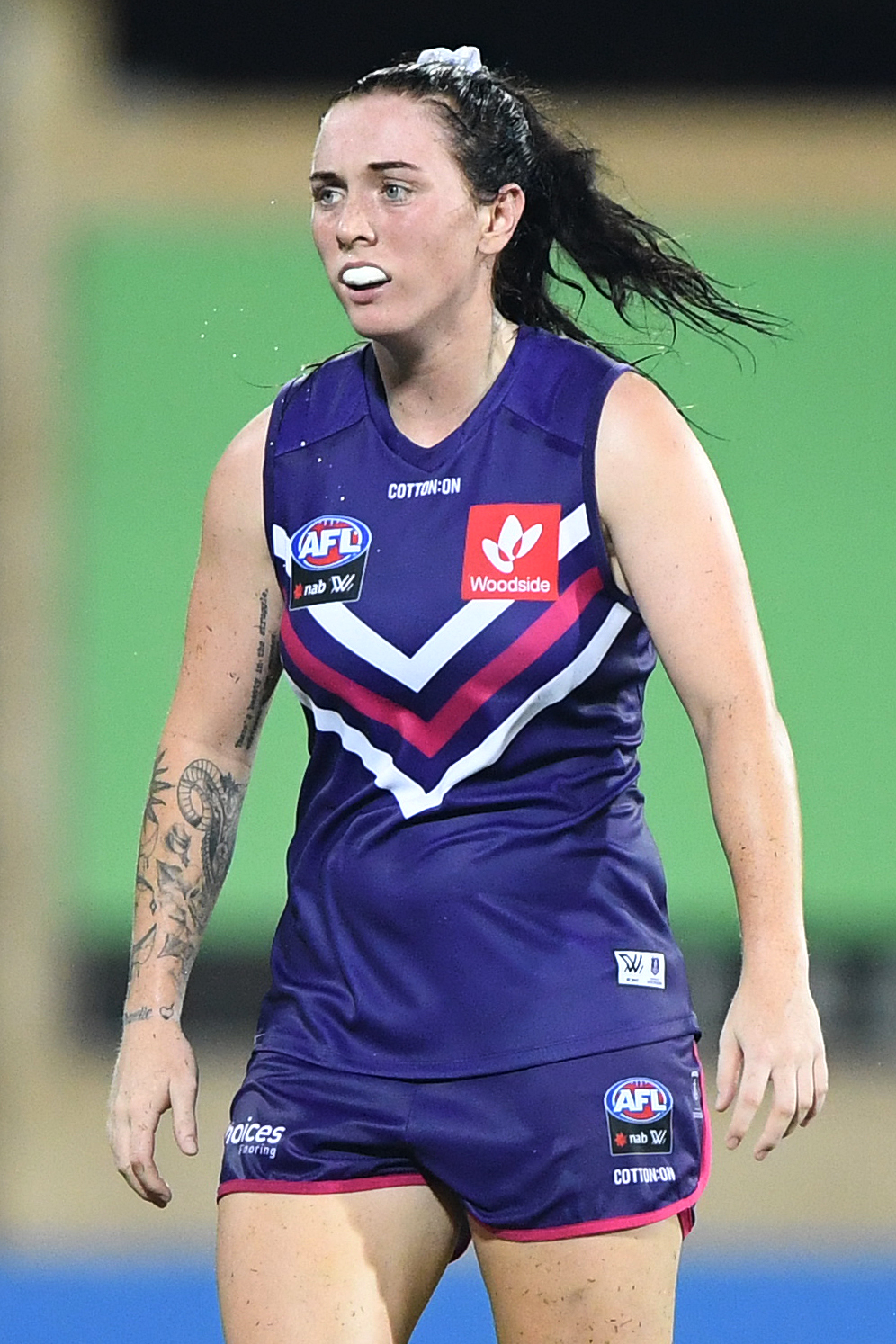
Sabreena McKinnon in 2019

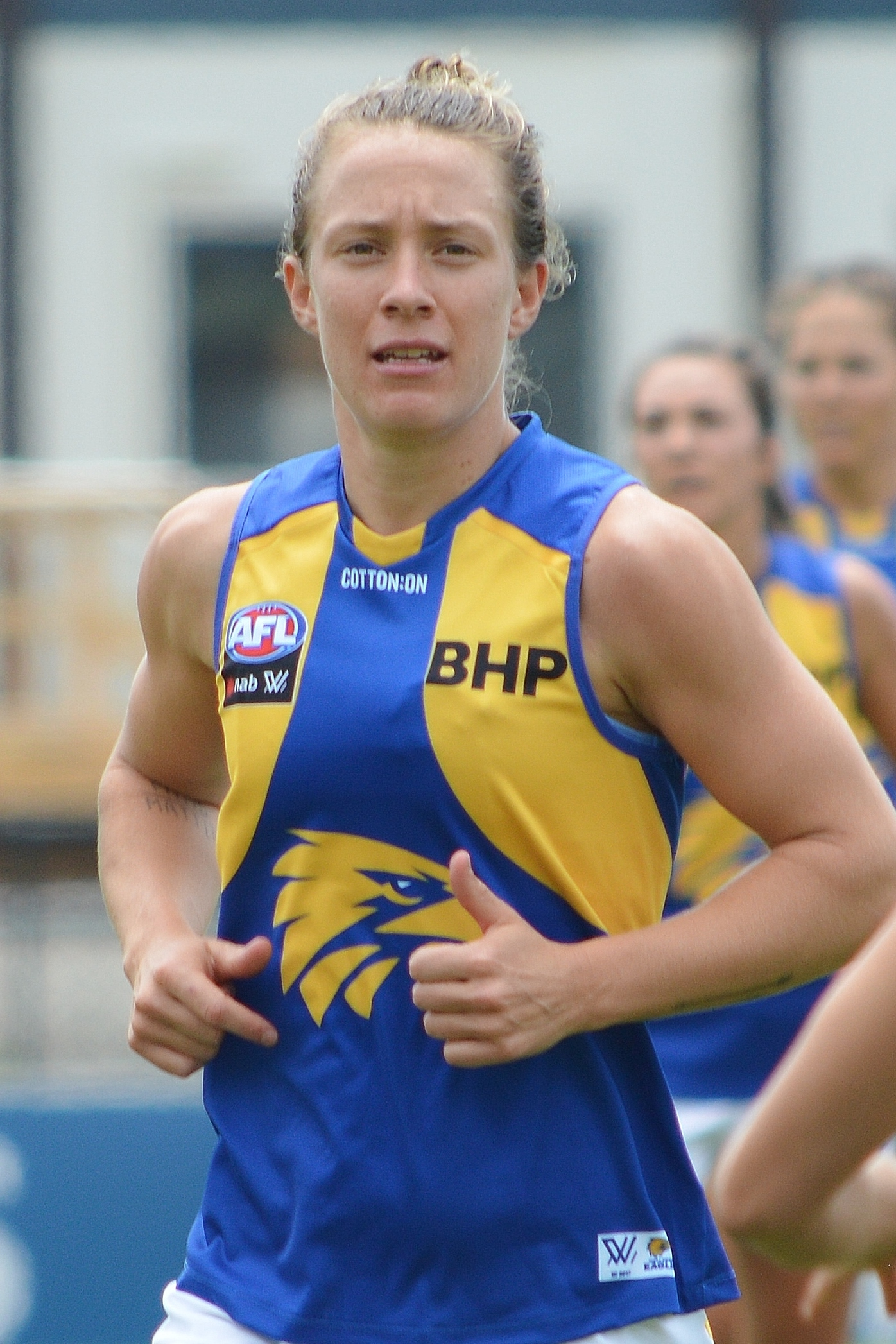
Emma Swanson is from Mandurah

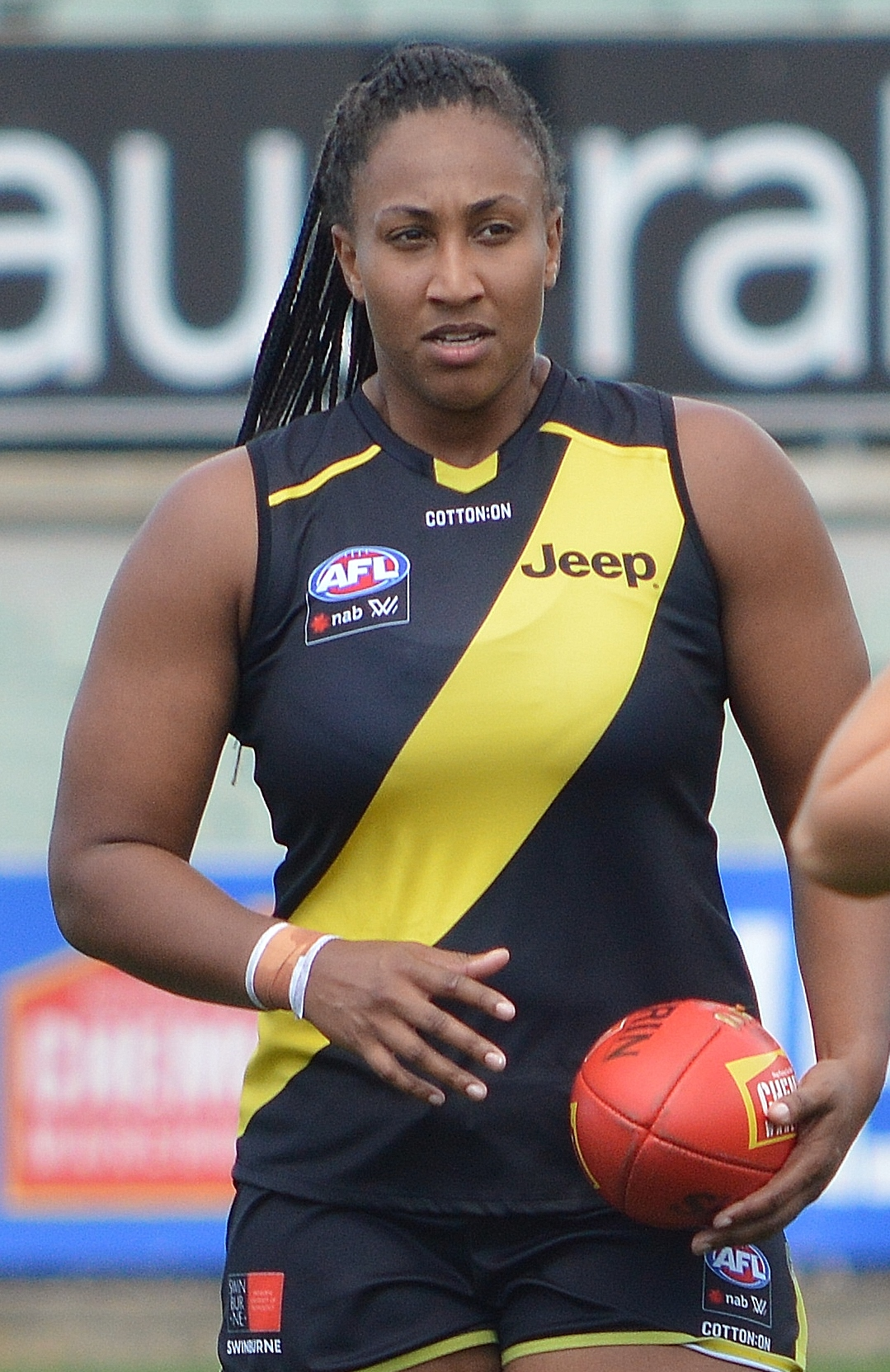
Sabrina Frederick is from Pinjarra

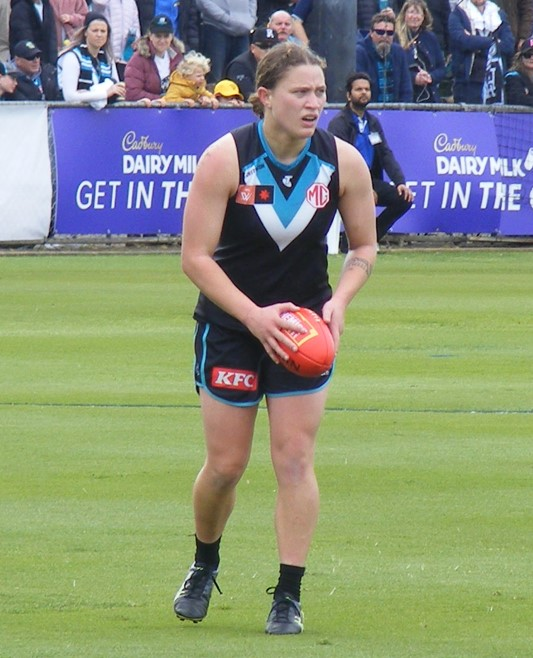
Abbey Dowrick is from Kalgoorlie

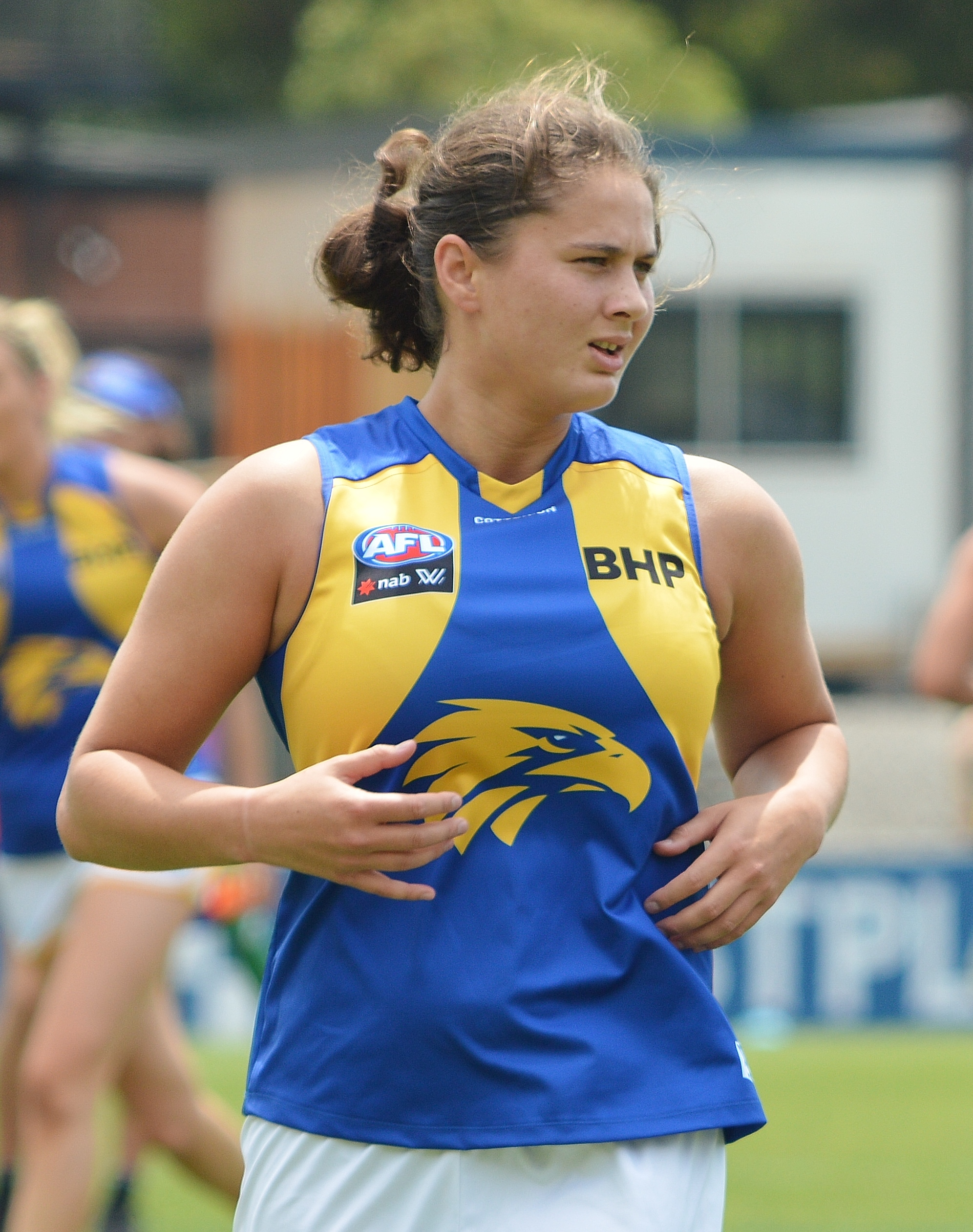
McKenzie Dowrick in 2020

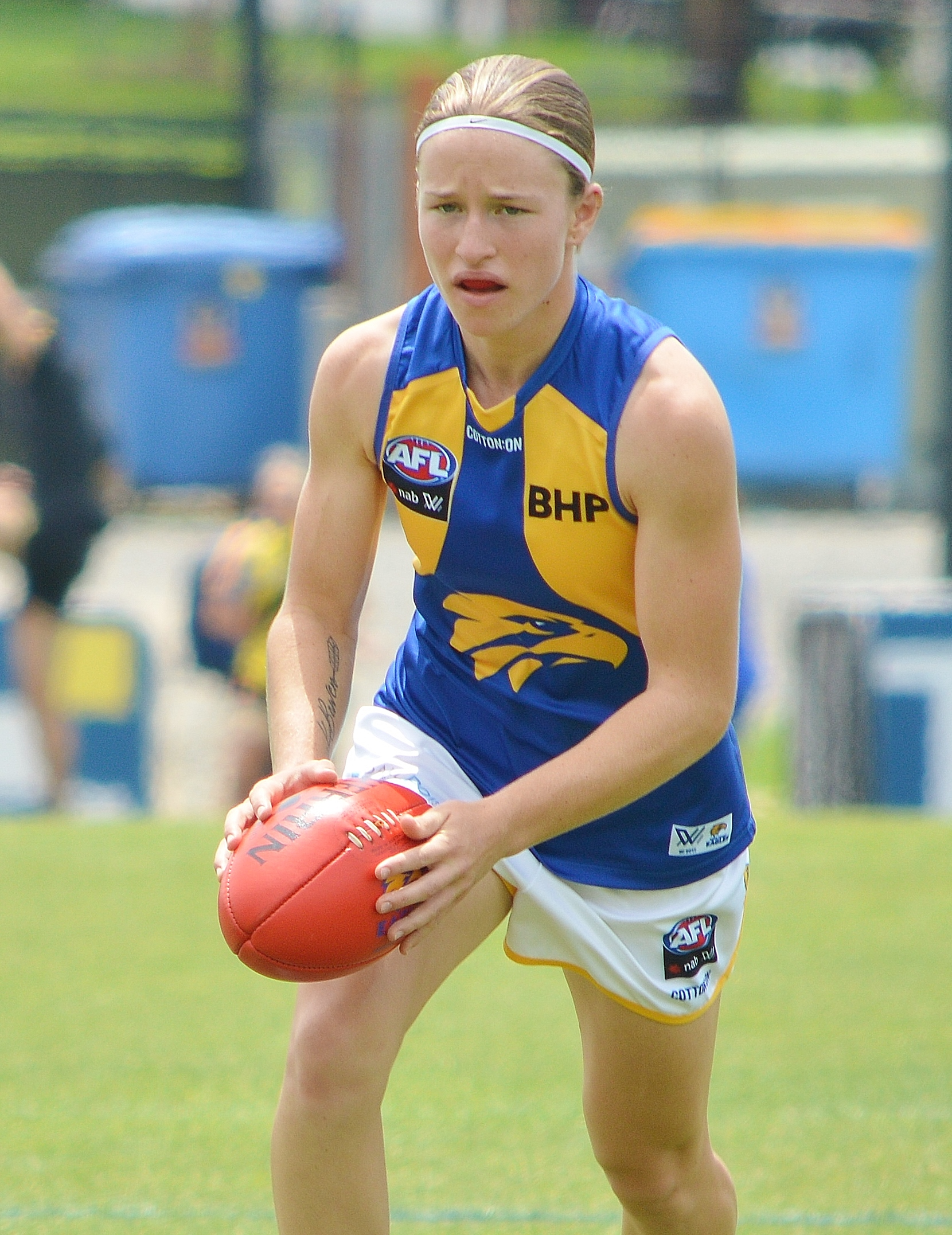
Mikayla Bowen in 2020

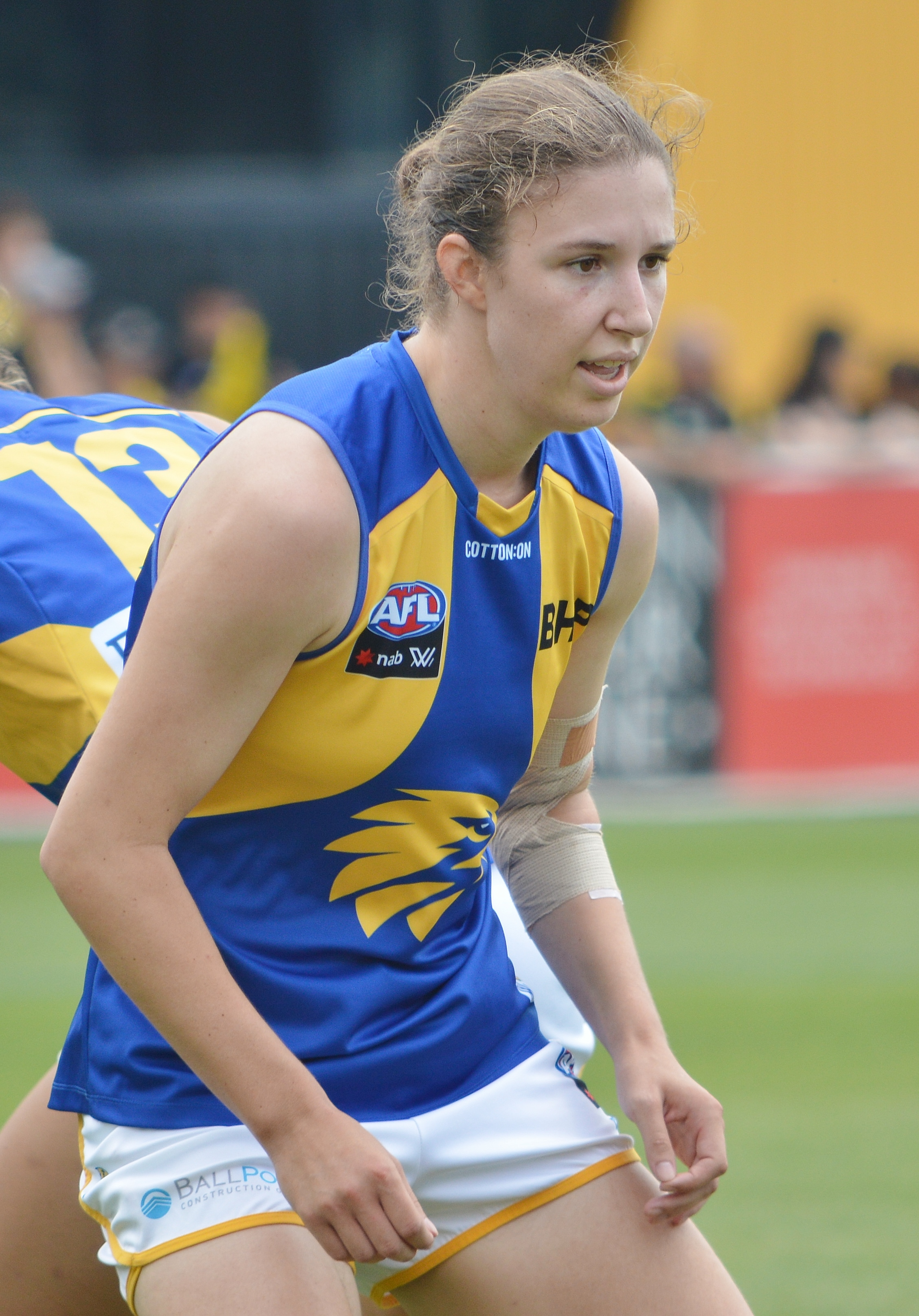
Sophie McDonald is from Albany

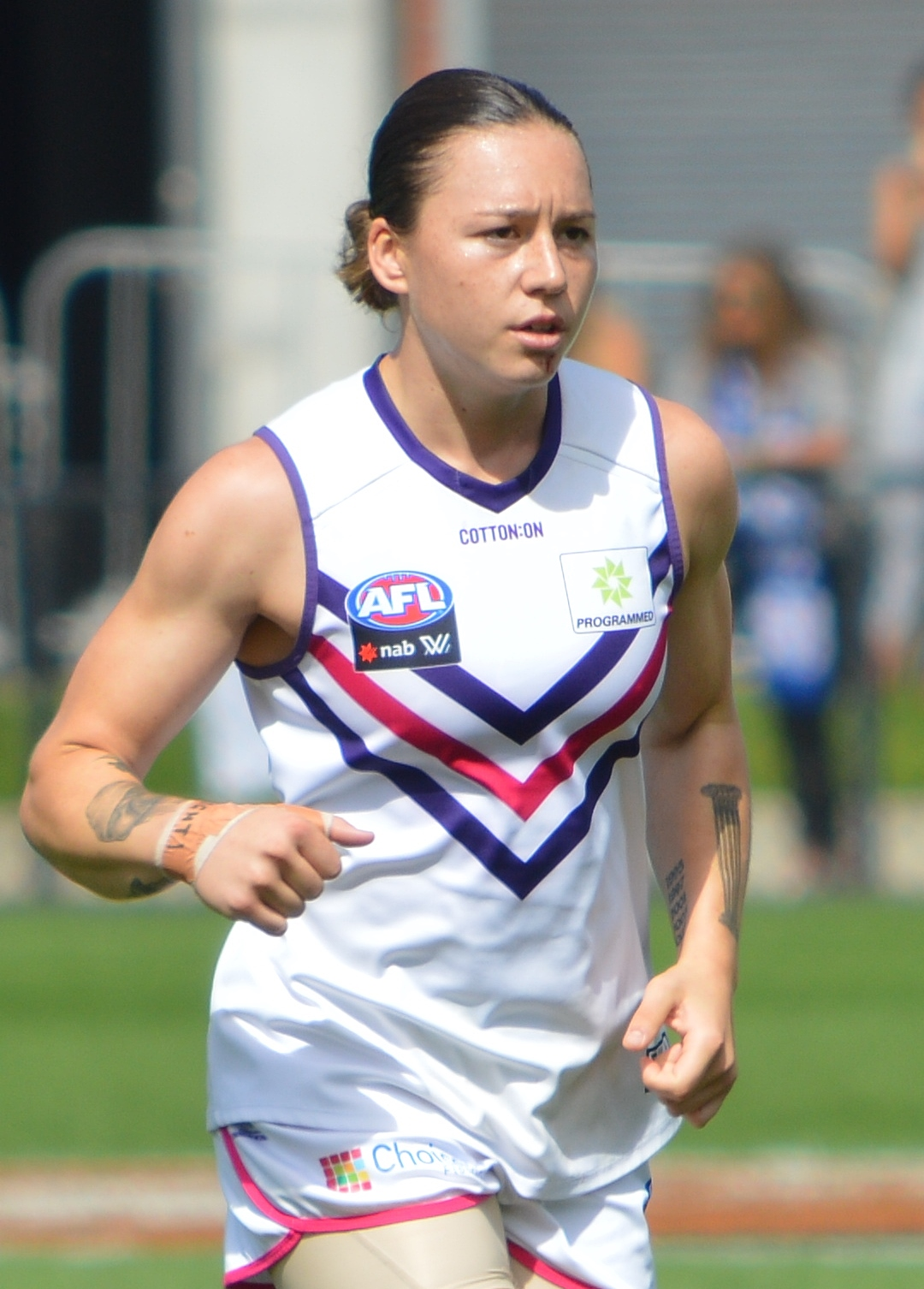
Roxanne Roux is from Dongara

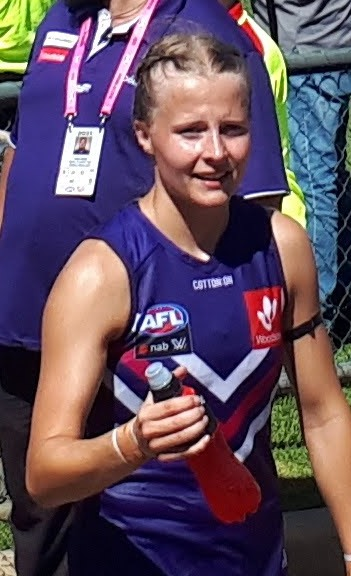
Mikayla Hyde in 2021

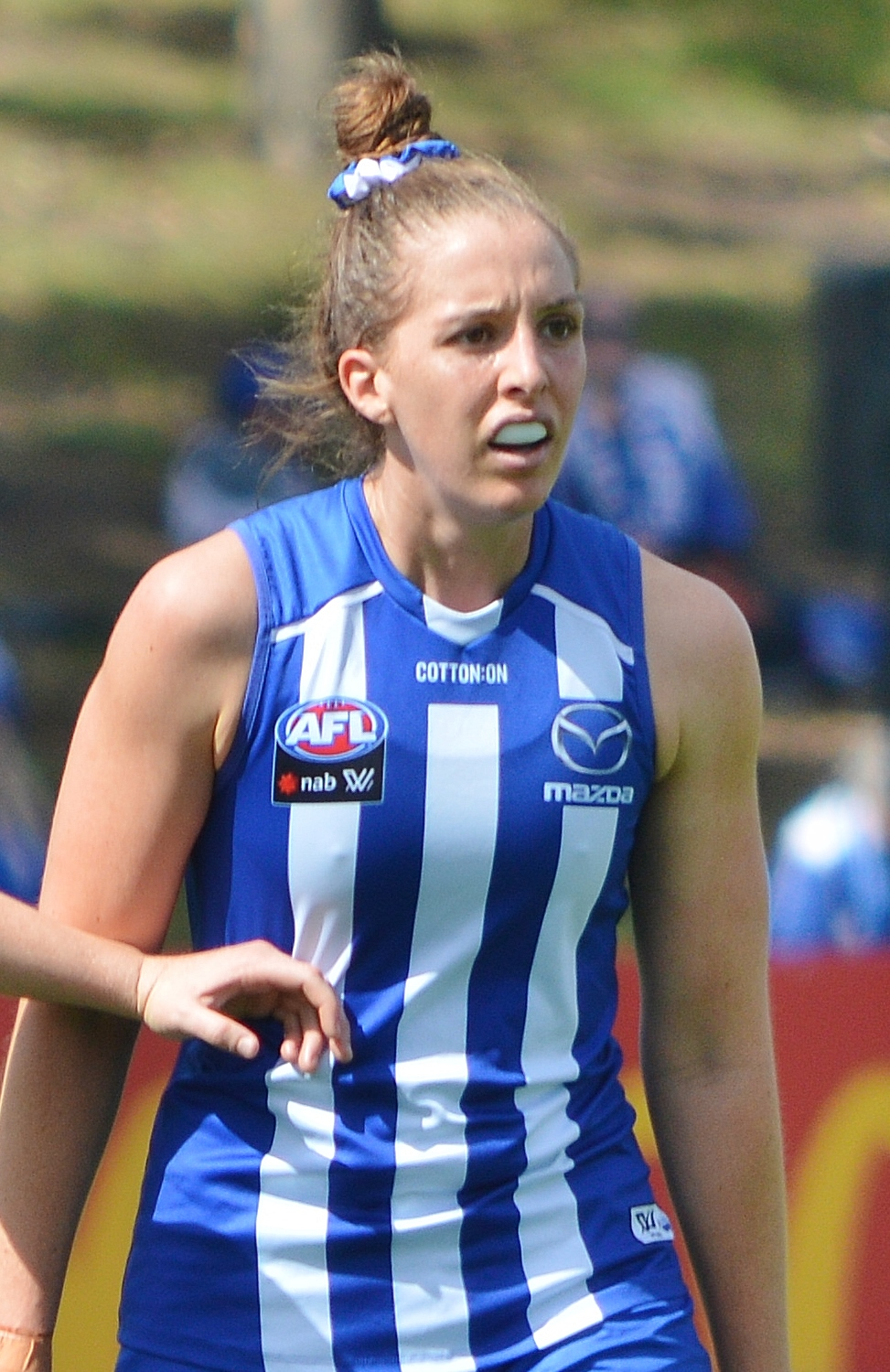
Emma King in 2021

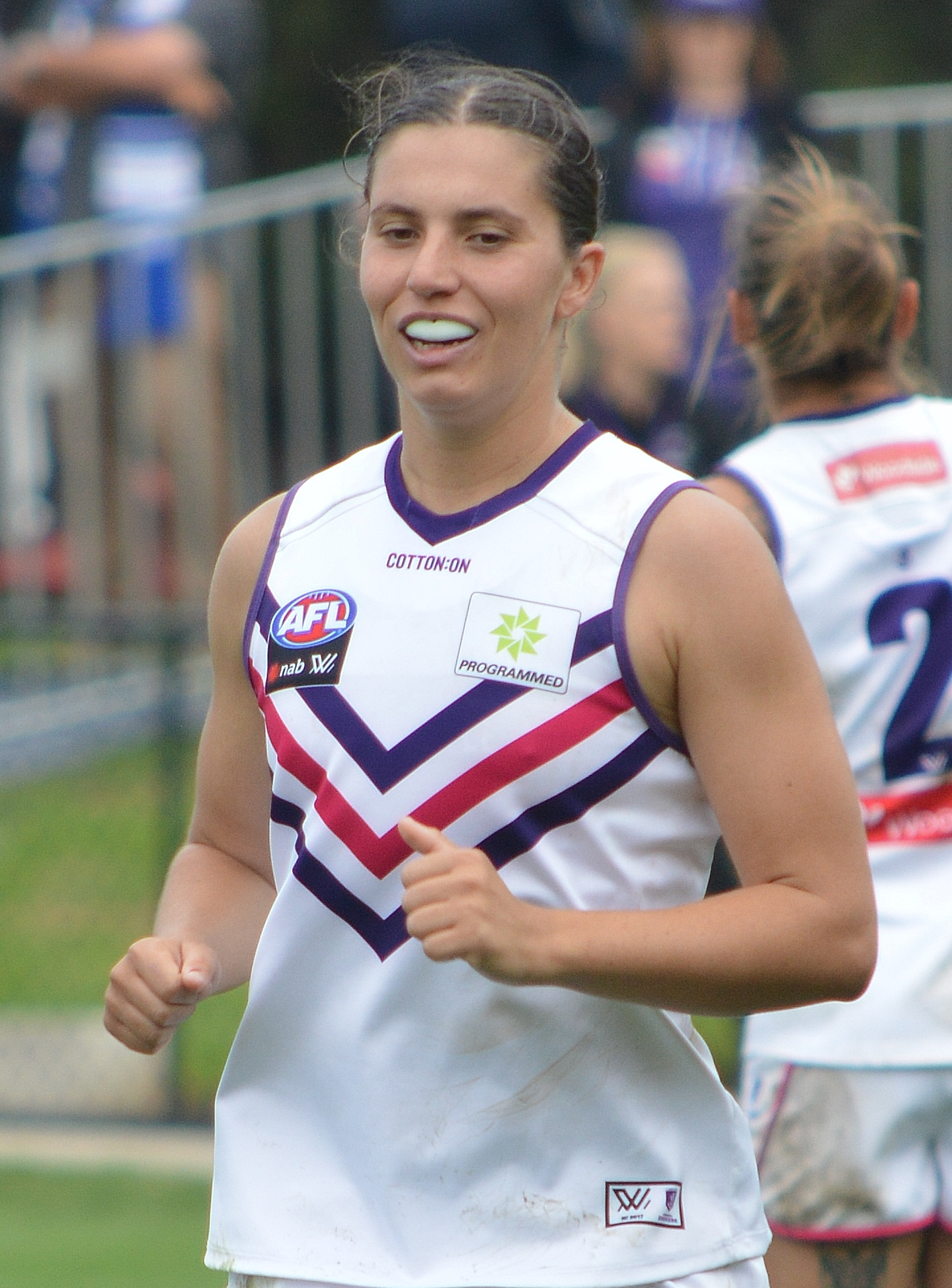
Matilda Sergeant in 2021

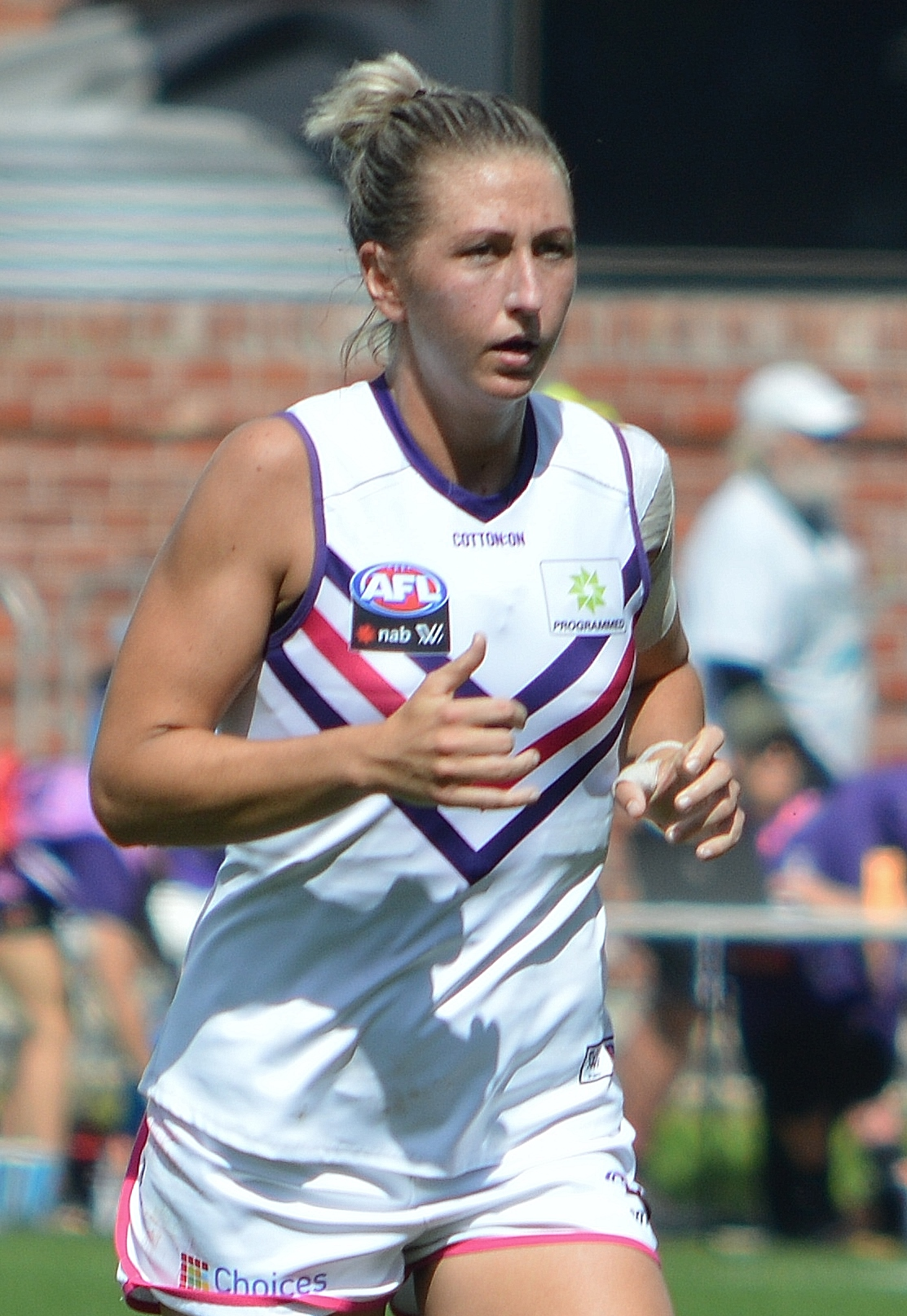
Janelle Cuthbertson in 2021

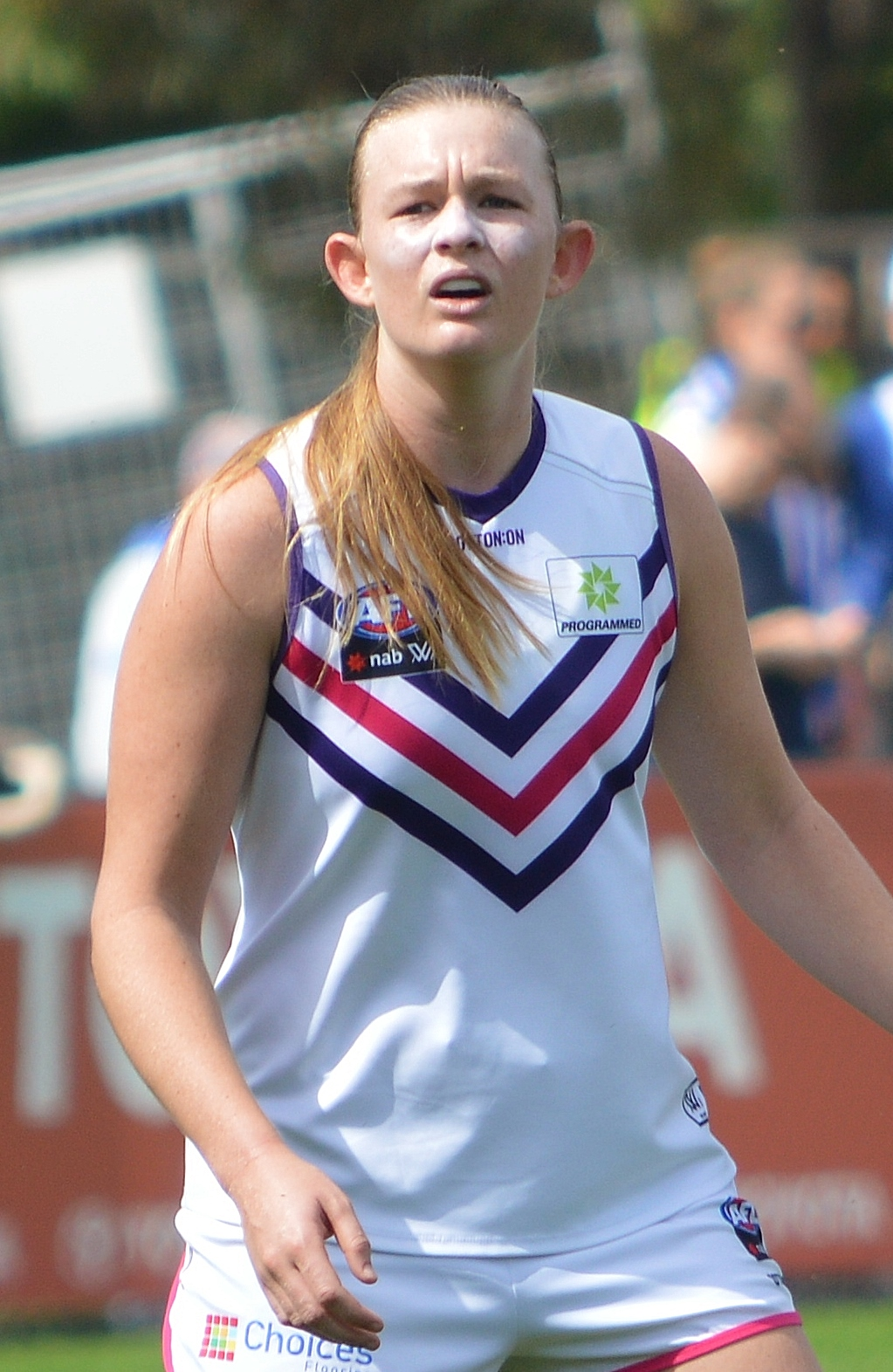
Mim Strom is from Exmouth

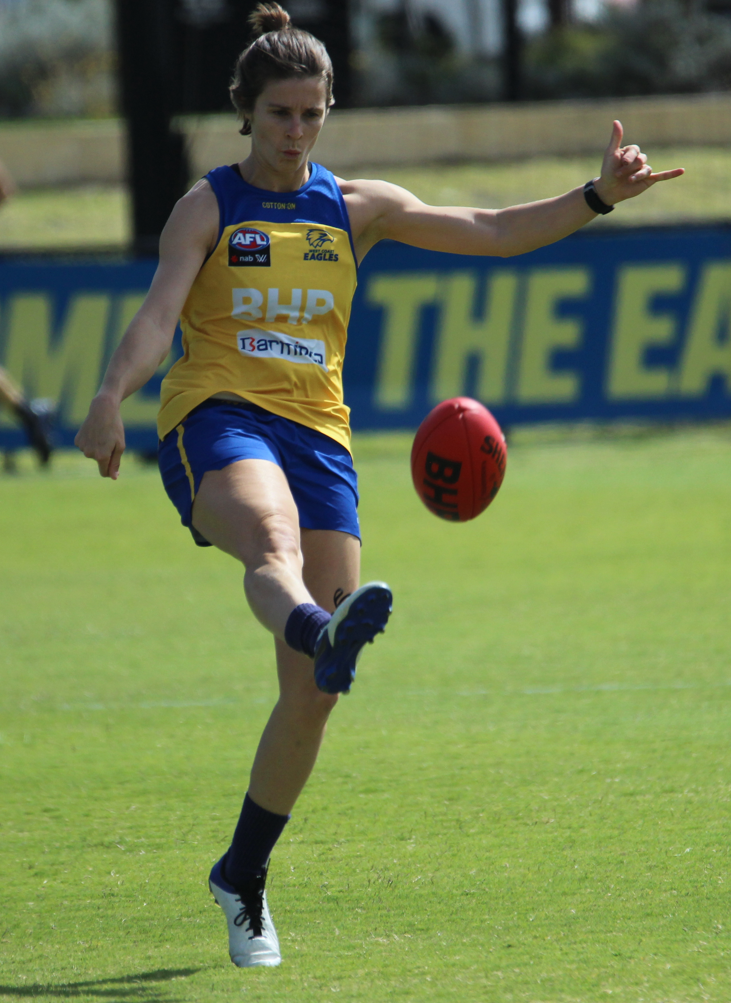
Belinda Smith is from Lake Grace

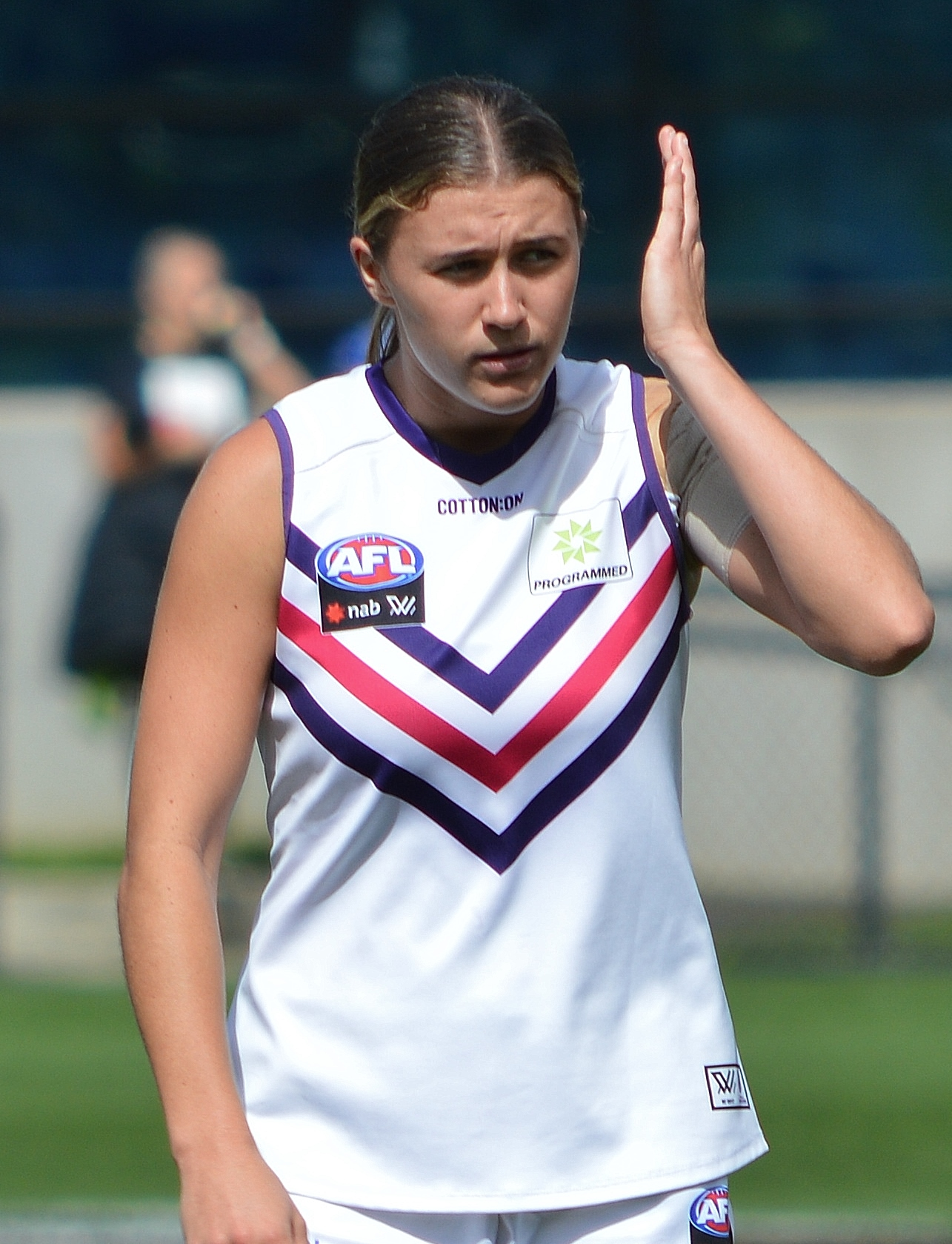
Emma O'Driscoll is from Northam

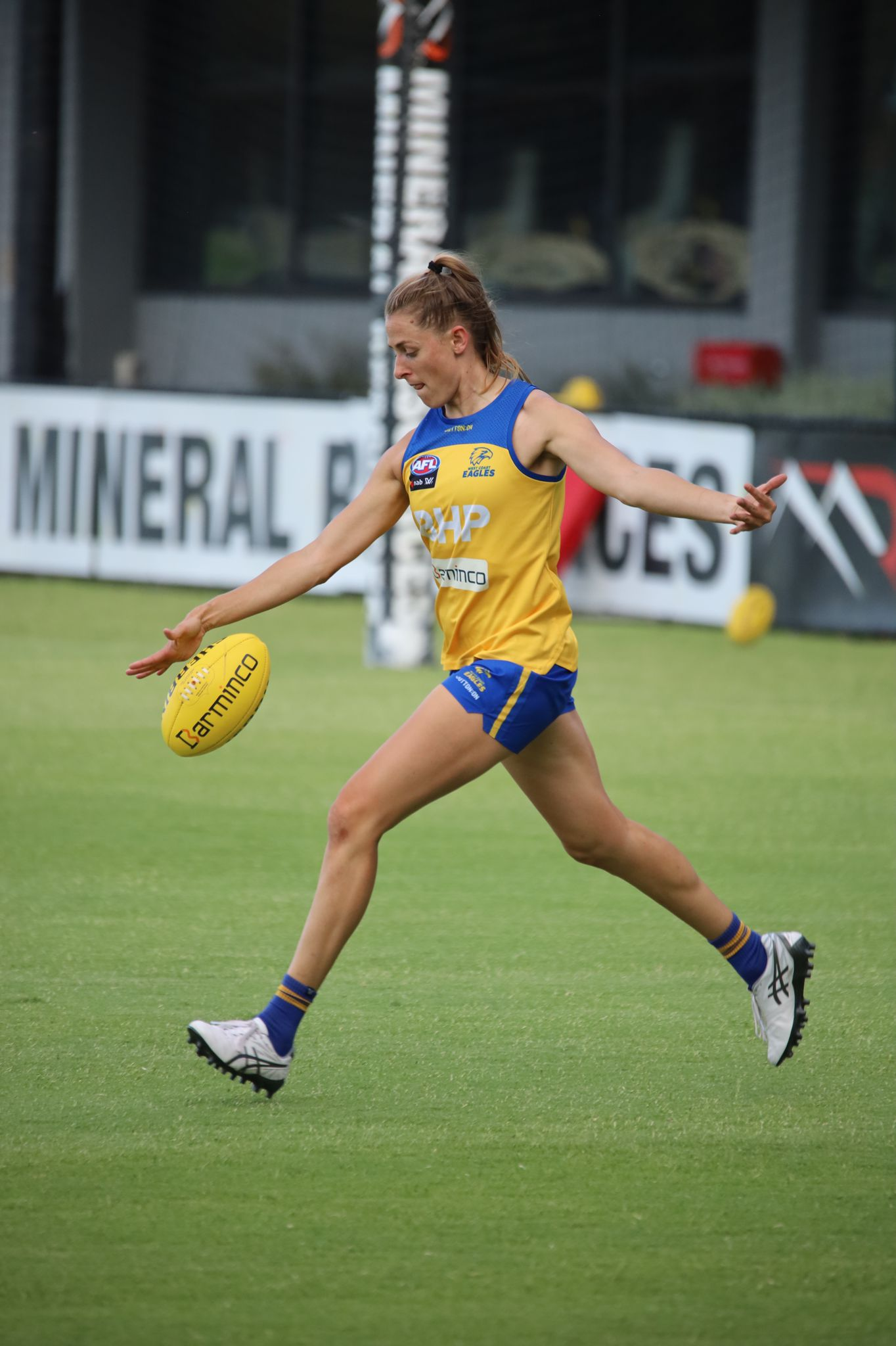
Aimee Schmidt in 2021

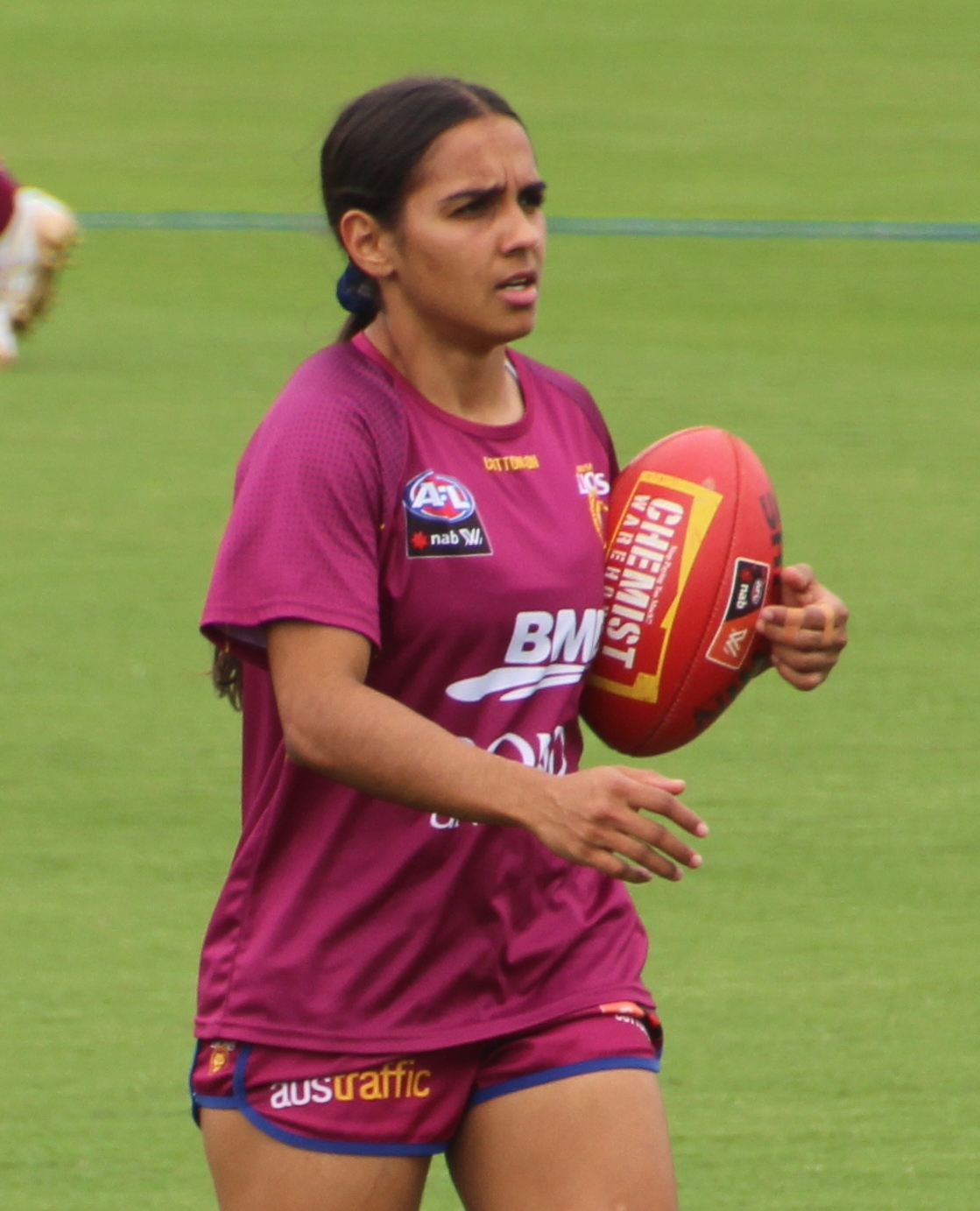
Courtney Hodder is from Perth

==== AFLW players from Western Australia ====
Currently on an AFLW senior list

Player	WA junior/senior club/s	Representative honours	AFLW Draft year	Selection	AFLW Years	AFLW Clubs	AFLW Games	AFLW (Goals)	Connections to Western Australia, Notes & References
Emmelie Fiedler	Curtin University, East Fremantle				2024-	St Kilda	-	-	Raised in Perth
Tess Lyons	University, West Coast				2024-	West Coast	1	0	Raised in Perth
Georgie Cleaver	Willetton Junior, East Fremantle, West Coast	U18 (2023)			2024-	West Coast	1	0	Raised in Perth
Brooke Barwick	Claremont				2024-	Western Bulldogs	1	0	Raised in Perth
Kaitlyn Srhoj	Peel Thunder	U18 (2023)	2023	#3	2024-	Greater Western Sydney	2	0	Raised in Mandurah
Tahleah Mulder	Piara Waters, South Fremantle, Fremantle		2023	Supplementary (#3)	2023-	Fremantle	4	0	Raised in Perth
Lauren Wakfer	South Fremantle, West Coast				2023-	West Coast	1	0	Raised in Rockingham
Emily Elkington	Claremont, West Coast				2023-	West Coast	1	0	Raised in Perth
Ariana Hetherington	Peel, South Fremantle, Fremantle				2023-	Fremantle	1	0	Raised in Perth
Eleanor Hartill	Collegians, East Fremantle, West Coast				2023-	West Coast, Brisbane	16	1	Raised in Perth
Abbey Dowrick	Miners Rovers				2022 (S7)-		20	1	Born and raised in Kalgoorlie
Ella Roberts	Peel, West Coast	U18 (2021)	2022	#14	2022 (S7)-		20	4	Raised in Perth
Courtney Rowley	Mandurah, Peel Thunder				2022-		15	1	Raised in Mandurah
Emily Bennett	West Perth, Claremont, West Coast Eagles	U18 (2019, 2021)			2022-		9	0	Raised in Perth
Beth Schilling	Marist, Carey Park, Peel Thunder, Subiaco, West Coast	U18 (2021)			2022-	West Coast	5	0	Raised in Bunbury
Maggie MacLachlan	Whitford, Subiaco, Fremantle				2022-	Fremantle	4	1	Raised in Perth
Jessica Low	Claremont, Fremantle		2021	#52	2022-	Fremantle	31	0	Raised in Perth
Charlie Thomas	Subiaco		2020	#3	2022-		30	1	Raised in Perth
Sarah Lakay	Swan Districts		2020	#40	2022-		20	0	Raised in Perth
Amy Franklin	Claremont		2020	#14	2022-		20	8	Raised in Perth
Dana East	Swan Districts		2021	#31	2022-		30	6	Raised in Manjimup
Mikayla Morrison	Swan Districts		2020	#30	2022-		4	3	Raised in Perth
Makaela Tuhakaraina	South Fremantle	U18 (2021)	2021	#38	2021-		16	5	Raised in Perth
Courtney Hodder	Peel	U18 (2016, 2017)	2020	Rookie	2021-		49	33	Raised in Perth (Noongar)
Sarah Verrier	Peel		2020	#14	2021-		40	2	Raised in Perth
Mikayla Hyde	Swan Districts		2020	Replacement	2021-		29	8	Raised in Perth
Isabella Lewis	Claremont	U18 (2019)	2020	#3	2021-		39	7	Raised in Perth
Shanae Davison	Norada Hawks, Swan Districts, West Coast		2020	#3	2021-	West Coast, Brisbane	18	1	Born and raised in Perth and Broome
Demi Liddle	Busselton, Peel		2020	Injury replacement	2021		4	0	Raised in Busselton
Mikayla Bowen	Helena's College, Swan Districts	U18 (2017, 2018, 2019)	2019	Expansion signing	2020-		36	8	Raised in Perth (Darlington)
Mim Strom	Perth	U18 (2019)	2019	#21	2020-		29	0	Raised in Exmouth
Sophie McDonald	Claremont	U18 (2017, 2018)	2019	#39	2020-		26	0	Raised in Albany
Roxanne Roux	East Fremantle	U18 (2019)	2019	#12	2020-		24	14	Raised in Dongara and Perth
Janelle Cuthbertson	Perth		2019	#81	2020-		24	0	Raised in Perth
Emma O'Driscoll	Swan Districts		2019	#51	2020-		25	1	Raised in Northam
Kate Orme	Claremont		2019	#70	2020-		7	1	Raised in Perth
Imahra Cameron	Kelmscott, South Fremantle, Perth, Swan Districts		2019	#19	2020-2022 (S7)		23	10	Raised in Perth (Noongar)
Bianca Webb	Swan Districts		2019	#85	2020-2022 (S7)		19	4	Raised in Perth
Ashton Hill	Mater Dei College, Joondalup Falcons, West Perth, East Fremantle		2019	Prelist	2020-2022		9	0	Raised in Perth (Joondalup)
Tarnee Tester	Subiaco		2019	#56	2020-2021		4	1	Recruited from Perth
Ann McMahon	East Fremantle		2019	#35	2020-2022		6	1	Raised in Perth
Emily Bonser	Claremont		2019	Prelist	2020		3	0	Raised in Perth
Sarah Garstone	Claremont		2019	#66	2020		1	0	Raised in Perth
Kate Bartlett	Safety Bay Stingers, Kolbe College, Peel	U18 (2016)	2018	#26	2019-		1	0	Raised in Rockingham
Matilda Sergeant	Claremont	U18 (2018)	2018	#64	2019-S7		19	0	Raised in Perth
Jasmin Stewart	Claremont	U18 (2016)	2018	#4	2019-2022		22	6	Born in Northam raised in Kambalda and the Pilbara (Djaru)
Courtney Guard	Subiaco		2018	#39	2019-2022		22	0	Raised in Perth
Sabreena McKinnon	Peel	U18 (2016, 2017, 2018)	2018	#17	2019-S7		29	34	Raised in Perth
Laura Pugh	West Perth		2018	#59	2019-		33	1	Raised in Perth
Philipa Seth	East Fremantle		2018	#28	2019-		32	1	Raised in Perth
McKenzie Dowrick	Subiaco	U18 (2017, 2018)	2018	#3	2019-		16	5	Raised in Perth
Parris Laurie	Claremont		2018	#50	2019-2022		33	1	Born and raised in Denmark
Brianna Moyes	South Mandurah, Peel Thunder		2018	Rookie signing	2019		1	0	Raised in Perth
Evangeline Gooch	East Fremantle		2017	#10	2018-		32	2	Raised in Perth
Jade de Melo	East Fremantle		2017	Rookie (#10)	2018-		9	4	Raised in Perth
Ashlee Atkins	East Fremantle		2017	#26	2018-2022 (S7)		41	10	Raised in Perth
Katie-Jayne Grieve	South Bunbury		2017	Rookie (#12)	2018-2021		16	3	Raised in Bunbury
Leah Mascall	East Fremantle		2017	#44	2018-2021		19	0	Raised in Perth
Emily McGuire	Swan Districts		2017	#33	2018-2020		6	2	Raised in Perth (Noongar)
Tayla McAuliffe	Swan Districts		2017	#19	2018-2019		3	0	Raised in Perth
Lisa Webb	Coastal Titans		2017	Rookie (#2)	2018		6	2	Raised in Perth
Jodie White	Coastal Titans		2017	#18	2018		4	0	Raised in Perth
Emma King	Coastal Titans		2016	Marquee	2017-		61	31	Raised in Perth
Hayley Miller	Coastal Titans		2016	#4	2017-		60	17	Born and raised in Perth
Sabrina Frederick	Peel, South Fremantle		2016	Marquee	2017-		59	26	Raised in Pinjarra
Gemma Houghton	Swan Districts		2016	Free agent	2017-		56	44	Born in Western Australia, raised in Perth
Stephanie Cain	Swan Districts		2016	#109	2017-		54	5	Raised in Perth
Ruby Schleicher	East Fremantle		2016	#137	2017-		51	3	Raised in Perth
Belinda Smith	East Fremantle		2016	#100	2017-		50	0	Born and raised in Lake Grace
Ebony Antonio	Swan Districts		2016	Priority	2017-		49	24	Raised in Perth
Gabby O'Sullivan	East Fremantle		2016	Preselection	2017-		49	17	Raised in Perth
Chelsea Randall	Safety Bay Stingers, Swan Districts	U18	2016	Marquee	2017-		48	18	Raised in Rockingham
Aimee Schmidt	Coastal Titans		2016	#17	2017-		42	22	Raised in Perth
Rebecca Beeson	Swan Districts		2016	#32	2017-		41	7	Raised in Perth
Angelique Stannett	-		2018	Rookie	2017-		37	0	Raised in Perth
Dana Hooker	Coastal Titans		2016	#130	2017-		48	10	Raised in Perth
Kara Antonio	Swan Districts		2016	Marquee	2017-		47	16	Raised in Perth
Emma Swanson	Peel, East Fremantle		2016	Marquee	2017-		35	4	Raised in Mandurah
Jess Wuetschner	East Fremantle		2016	#34	2017-		47	40	Recruited from Perth
Kiara Bowers	Coastal Titans		2016	Marquee	2017-		33	7	Raised in Perth
Akec Makur Chuot	East Perth, Swan Districts		2016	#139	2017-		33	2	Raised in Perth
Ashley Sharp	Swan Districts		2016	#20	2017-2022 (S7)		34	25	Raised in Perth
Tayla Bresland	Peel Thunder		2016	#52	2017-2022		25	1	Raised in Perth
Melissa Caulfield	East Fremantle		2016	#77	2017-2022		33	8	Raised in Perth
Tiah Toth	Coastal Titans		2016	#36	2017-2022		24	1	Raised in Katanning and Perth
Renee Forth	Coastal Titans		2016	Marquee	2017-2021		22	1	Raised in Perth
Beatrice Devlyn	South Fremantle		2017	Injury replacement	2017-2021		8	0	Raised in Perth
Brianna Green	East Fremantle		2016	#13	2017-2021		7	0	Raised in Perth
Alicia Janz	Swan Districts		-	Injury replacement	2017-2021		20	0	Raised in Derby
Alex Williams	East Fremantle		2016	Priority	2017-2021		20	0	Raised in Perth
Cassie Davidson	East Fremantle		2016	#84	2017-2020		17	0	Raised in Perth
Kirby Bentley	Swan Districts		2016	Priority	2017-2019		10	1	Raised in Perth
Amy Lavell	Coastal Titans		2016	#61	2017-2018		14	8	Raised in Perth
Caitlyn Edwards	East Fremantle		2016	#43	2017-2018		14	6	Born and raised in Perth (Thornlie)
Lara Filocamo	Coastal Titans		2016	#29	2017-2018		14	2	Raised in Perth
Stacey Barr	Coastal Titans		2016	#68	2017-2018		12	5	Raised in Perth
Tara Morgan	South Fremantle		2016	#144	2017-2018		11	0	Born in Kununurra, raised in Broome
Demi Okely	Peel Thunder		2016	#125	2017		7	0	Raised in Perth
Kelly Clinch	Subiaco		2016	#116	2017		6	0	Raised in Perth
Kira Phillips	Peel Thunder		2016	#45	2017		5	2	Raised in Perth
Taylah Angel	Swan Districts		2016	#93	2017		4	0	Raised in Perth
Tarnica Golisano	Coastal Titans		2016	Free agent	2017		4	0	Raised in Perth
Kim Mickle	-		2016	Rookie	2017		1	0	Born and raised in Perth

== See also ==
- Australian rules football in Western Australia
