= List of Deakin University people =

This is a list of Deakin University people, including notable alumni and staff.

== Notable alumni ==
=== Business ===
- Jeremy Burge, entrepreneur and founder of Emojipedia
- Adinda Cresheilla, businesswoman, Indonesian G20 Ambassador, fashion model, Puteri Indonesia Pariwisata 2022 and Miss Supranational Indonesia 2022
- Simon Garlick, CEO of the Western Bulldogs:
- Carolyn Hardy, CEO UNICEF Australia
- Princess Jahnavi Kumari of Mewar, Family Office Private Equity Investment Management
- Christopher Lynch, former Chief Financial Officer & Former Director of BHP, CEO of Transurban: BCom, MBA
- Michael Malouf, former Chief Executive Officer, Carlton Football Club
- Lindsay Maxsted, Chairman Westpac
- Bruce Peterson, Founder and Chairman of Grande Experiences
- Jim Stynes OAM, businessman and Chairman of Melbourne Football Club

=== Government ===
==== Politicians ====
===== Federal politicians =====
- Mark Butler MP, Federal Member for Port Adelaide
- Trish Crossin, Senator for Northern Territory
- Bridget McKenzie, Senator for Victoria, Deputy Leader of the Nationals
- Catherine King MP, Federal Member for Ballarat: LLB
- Michael Sukkar MP, Federal Member for Deakin
- Libby Coker MP, Federal Member for Corangamite
- Helen Haines MP, Federal Member for Indi
- Raff Ciccone, Senator for Victoria
- Dave Sharma MP, Federal Member for Wentworth

===== Australian state and territory politicians =====
- Julie Attwood, Member of Legislative Assembly of Queensland
- John Brumby, former Premier and Treasurer of the State of Victoria
- Josh Bull, Member of Legislative Assembly of Victoria: Country Newspaper Journalism
- Georgie Crozier, Member of Legislative Council of Victoria
- Matt Fregon, Member of Legislative Assembly of Victoria
- Mark Gepp, Member of Legislative Council of Victoria
- Danielle Green, Member of Legislative Assembly of Victoria
- Peter Gutwein, Premier of the State of Tasmania
- John Hyde, Member of Legislative Assembly of Western Australia First openly gay man to be elected to the Western Australian parliament
- Andrew Katos, Former Member of Legislative Assembly of Victoria
- Denis Napthine, Premier of the State of Victoria: MBA
- Lisa Neville, Member of Legislative Assembly of Victoria
- Craig Ondarchie, Member of Legislative Council of Victoria
- Jaala Pulford, Member of Legislative Council of Victoria
- Tim Richardson, Member of Legislative Assembly of Victoria
- Adem Somyurek, Member of Legislative Council of Victoria
- Nina Springle, Former Member of Legislative Council of Victoria, Former Deputy Leader of the Victorian Greens
- Jaclyn Symes, Member of Legislative Council of Victoria

===== International politicians =====
- Mahmoud Saikal, Permanent representative of Afghanistan to the UN

==== Public servants ====
- Neil Comrie, former Chief Commissioner of Victoria Police

=== Humanities ===
==== Arts ====
- Anurag Singh, Pollywood and Bollywood director
- Rodger Corser, Australian actor: Honours B.A in Media Studies
- Tony Ellwood, Director of the National Gallery of Victoria and former director of Queensland Art Gallery and Gallery of Modern Art: M.App.Sc.(Museum Studies)
- Oliver Feltham, contemporary philosopher and English translator of Alain Badiou's Being and Event (2006)
- Rachel Griffiths, actress
- Mandawuy Yunupingu, indigenous musician, community leader and Australian of the Year (1992)
- Xander Pratt, Avant-garde interdisciplinary artist

==== Journalism ====
- Emma Alberici, journalist/presenter with the ABC
- Livinia Nixon, Nine Network weather presenter
- Leigh Sales, ABC journalist, anchor of 7.30 and author: Master of International Relations, Brisbane Writers Festival.
- Stella Young, comedian, journalist and disability rights activist: BA
- Nathan Templeton, former 10 News First sports reporter and now the Melbourne correspondent on Sunrise
- Neary Ty, news reporter for Channel 9

=== Sport ===
- Jakara Anthony, skier
- Jimmy Bartel, 2007 Brownlow Medallist and triple AFL Premiership Player in 2007, 2009 and 2011 with the Geelong Football Club. 2011 Norm Smith medallist
- Kristina Bates, field hockey player
- Mark Blake, 2009 AFL Premiership player with the Geelong Football Club
- Belle Brockhoff, snowboarder
- Campbell Brown, 2008 AFL Premiership player with Hawthorn Football Club and inaugural Gold Coast Football Club player: BCom (Sports Management)
- Tim Callan, AFL footballer with the Western Bulldogs:
- Briony Cole, Gold medalist, 2006 Commonwealth Games, & Silver medalist, 2008 Beijing Olympics
- Peter Daniel, former footballer for Essendon Football Club, AFL
- Ben Graham, former Geelong Football Club star, now a punter for the Arizona Cardinals of the National Football League; first Australian to play in the Super Bowl
- Tom Harley, Dual Premiership Captain of Geelong Football Club in 2007 and 2009
- Dean Hewitt, curler
- Geoff Hunt, World Champion squash player: Charles William ape
- Michael Klinger, Australian cricketer
- Carmen Marton, Australia's first ever world taekwondo champion
- Ezi Magbegor, basketballer
- Mat McBriar, punter for the Dallas Cowboys of the National Football League
- Alex Pearce, Australian rules footballer
- Nathan Pellissier, table tennis player
- Henry Playfair, AFL footballer with the Sydney Swans: BCom
- Jeff Rowley, surfer and celebrity speaker: MBA in leadership and communications.
- Matt Stevic, AFL umpire
- Jack Viney, Australian rules footballer
- Breann Moody, Australian rules footballer

=== Other ===
- Phillip Aspinall, Primate of the Anglican Church in Australia: MBA
- Colonel Benito T. de Leon, Military Officer, Philippines Army: MA (Strategic Studies)
- Arthur Vivian Lucas Jones, Bishop of the Anglican Church in Australia
- Major General Mark Kelly, Officer of the Australian Army: Grad.Dip. Defence Studies
- James Kilgore, as Charles William Pape, member of the Symbionese Liberation Army: PhD
- Mary Macken-Horarik, linguist
- Sally-Anne McCormack, Australian clinical psychologist
- Anika Molesworth, agroecology scientist
- Kathryn Sheffield, remote sensing, BS
- Christopher Sonn, social psychologist, GDed. (Victoria College)
- Tracey Vivien Steinrucken, Rhodes Scholar, ecologist, molecular biologist

== Notable staff ==
- Kevin Anderson, filmmaker
- Kate Buchanan, ARC Future Fellow
- Tania de Koning-Ward, Commonwealth Health Minister's Medal for Excellence in Health and Medical Research
- Peter Hodgson, 2009 Australian Laureate Fellow
- John Jonas, Birks Professor of Metallurgy, McGill University: Visiting Professor.
- Ross Oakley, former Australian Football League CEO: Adjunct Professor in the Faculty of Business and Law
- David Parkin, former coach of Carlton and Hawthorn Football Clubs: Lecturer in Exercise Science.
- Mark Weinberg, Chief Justice of Norfolk Island: Adjunct Professor, School of Law.
- Jim Kennan, former politician, Adjunct Professor of Law
- Svetha Venkatesh, Director of the Centre for Pattern Recognition and Data Analytics

== Administration ==
=== Chancellors ===
| Order | Chancellor | Years | Notes |
|---|---|---|---|
| 1 | John Stanhope AM | 2016–present | |

=== Vice-Chancellors ===
| Order | Vice-Chancellor | Years | Notes |
|---|---|---|---|
| 1 | Frederic Jevons | 1977–1985 | |
| 2 | Malcolm Skilbeck | 1986–1991 | |
| 3 | John A. Hay | 1992–1996 | |
| 4 | Geoff Wilson | 1997–2002 | |
| 5 | Sally Walker | 2003–2010 | |
| 6 | Jane den Hollander | 2010–2016 | |
