= Skilbeck =

Skilbeck is a surname of English origin. Notable people with the surname include:

- John Skilbeck (born 1958), Australian cricketer
- Malcolm Skilbeck (1932–2022), Australian educationist

== See also ==
- Skillebekk
