= Parkes College (Deakin University) =

- Deakin University
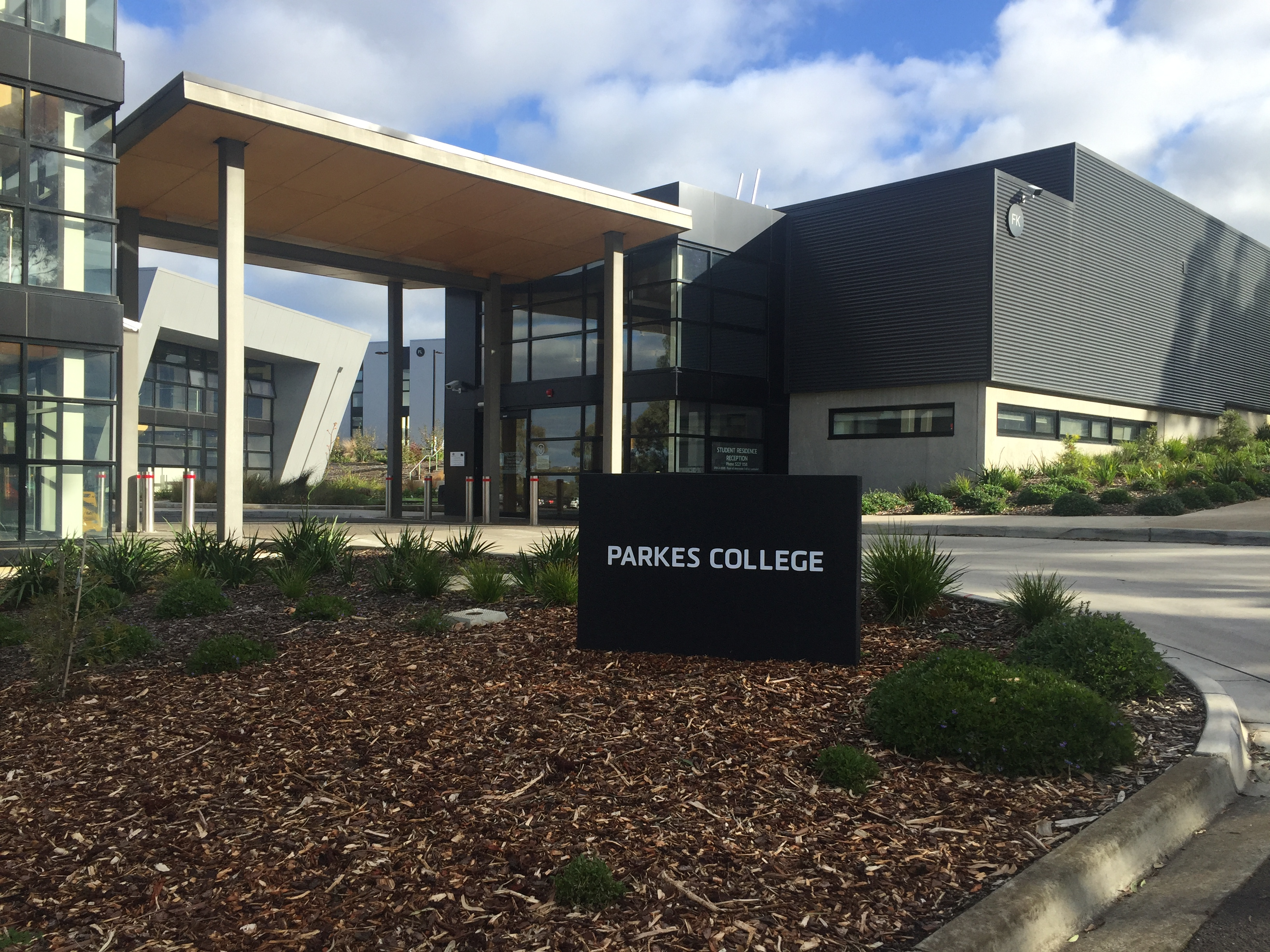
- Entrance to Parkes College (with Deakin Residence reception in background)

- Location: Residence Road, Deakin University, Waurn Ponds, Geelong
- Coordinates: 38.199875°S 144.302694°E
- Established: 2014
- Named for: Sir Henry Parkes
- Residents: FJ, FK, FL, FM
- Mascot: The Parkes Panther; NRAS Knights (formerly)

Parkes College is a college of the Waurn Ponds campus of Deakin University. It was developed from 2011 and opened in 2014 as part of the National Rental Affordability Scheme (NRAS).

Parkes College offers students studio apartments to rent, featuring private bedrooms, kitchenettes, and bathrooms, as well as shared study rooms.

== See also ==
- Alfred Deakin College (Deakin University)
- Barton College (Deakin University)
