= Deakin University School of Medicine =

Educational institution in Australia

Coordinates: 38°11′50″S 144°17′55″E

- Type: Public
- Dean: Professor Gary Rogers
- Academic staff: 60
- Administrative staff: 225
- Students: 520
- Location: Geelong and Melbourne, VIC, Australia
- Campus: Urban and Regional
- Affiliations: Deakin University
- Website: http://www.deakin.edu.au/medicine
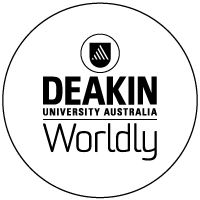

Deakin University School of Medicine is a medical school based in the state of Victoria, Australia. It offers a four-year, graduate-entry, Doctor of Medicine (M.D.) degree. Students must complete a Bachelor’s degree before entry, together with GAMSAT/MCAT test and a medical interview. Course entry is highly competitive with more than 3600 domestic applicants indicated Deakin as a preference for 130 MD places in 2023-2024 via GEMSAS, making it one of the most applied-to medical schools in Australia.

The medical degree is a 4-year postgraduate course, with 2 years of pre-clinical education at the University campus in Waurn Ponds, and then 2 years clinical education at one of the 5 clinical schools (4 in regional Victoria and 1 in Melbourne).

The School has also developed other new undergraduate and postgraduate programs, namely Optometry, Medical Imaging, Agricultural Health and Medicine, Bachelor of Biomedical Science, Health and Medical Science, Master of Surgical Research and Master in Clinical Leadership.

== History ==
On 8 April 2006, Australian Prime Minister John Howard announced that Deakin University would host a new medical school in Victoria. The Federal Government's Budget 2006 allocated federal fundings for the establishment of Deakin University's School of Medicine. Under Professor Brendan Crotty, the first cohort of 120 students commenced their medical studies on 7 February 2008.

The School of Medicine was officially opened on 1 May 2008 by Prime Minister Kevin Rudd.

In 2011, there were 130 Commonwealth Supported Places available. This figure included 33 Bonded Medical Places and 5 Medical Rural Bonded Scholarships (MRBS).

== Research ==
The School of Medicine houses a program of research, including over 100 academic and other research staff as well as nearly 100 research students.

The School's research is centred on four Research Pillars:

- Infection, Immunity & Cancer
- Metabolic & Musculoskeletal Medicine
- Neuroscience
- Rural & Regional Health

Each of the School's Strategic Research Centres, Research Groups and Research Partnerships align closely with one or more of these Research Pillars.

== Teaching hospitals ==
The first two pre-clinical years of the course are based at the Geelong Campus at Waurn Ponds.

In third and fourth years, students are based at clinical schools located at the following teaching hospitals affiliated with the Deakin University School of Medicine:

- Geelong Hospital (Barwon Health)
- Box Hill Hospital, Maroondah Hospital, Angliss Hospital (Melbourne's Eastern Health)
- Ballarat Base Hospital (Ballarat Health Services)
- Warrnambool Hospital (South West Healthcare)
- RCCS Program (Third year only)

== Deakin University's Rural Community Clinical School Program (RCCS) ==
Around 25-30 medical students spend their third year attached to a regional general practice and a regional hospital where they complete a 'parallel rural community curriculum' through the Rural Community Clinical School (RCCS). Students cover the same material as those studying in Geelong or Melbourne, which include Medicine, Surgery, Paediatrics and Obstetrics/Gynaecology. Third year Deakin University medical students in the RCCS program are hosted in regional and rural Victorian towns including Bacchus Marsh, Maryborough, Colac, Ararat, Camperdown, Casterton, Horsham, Stawell and Hamilton.

Teaching is provided by face-to-face instruction by general practitioners and visiting medical and surgical specialists. Unlike in the other clinical schools attached to Deakin, the RCCS curriculum follows a Longitudinal Integrated Clerkship (LIC) model. Through this model, rather than cycling through set rotations throughout the year, students encounter a wide range of patient presentations, both outpatient and inpatient, which cover the same content that is encountered through conventional rotation-based learning.

Another aspect of the RCCS program is that students perform "parallel consulting" in general practice and visiting specialists' consulting rooms. This means the student consults one-on-one with a patient, then presents their findings to the supervising doctor. The doctor completes the consultation with the student observing, giving the student opportunities to develop practical clinical skills such as history taking, physical examination, case presentation and medical management. By placing students in rural general practices and hospitals rather than major metropolitan hospitals, the aim of RCCS is to give students exposure to rural medicine, with the ultimate objective of encouraging more medical graduates to work in regional Australia.

== Deakin Medical Students' Association ==
MeDUSA (the Medicine at Deakin University Student Association), was established in 2008 to coincide with the entry of the first cohort of students.
