= Maxsted =

Maxsted is a surname. Notable people with the surname include:

- Jack Maxsted (1916–2001), English art director
- Lindsay Maxsted, Australian businessman
