= MRBS =

MRBS may refer to:

- Mean Rounds Between Stoppages, a military abbreviation describing a test used notably for the M240 machine gun development
- Medical rural bonded scholarship, a program intended to increase the number of doctors practising in rural and remote regions of Australia
- Member of the Royal British Society of Sculptors
- Meeting Room Booking System, MRBS is a booking system to book any resource
