= Bonded medical place =

A Bonded Medical Place, also referred to as BMP, is an enrollment place in an Australian medical school that requires students who graduate from the program to work in an area of workforce shortage after completing fellowship. Doctors who graduate from a Bonded Medical Place in a medical program must work a number of years in an area of workforce shortage equal to the number of years of their medical degree. The term bonded means that medical students who graduate from the program are bound by a legal contract to serve in an area of workforce shortage stipulated by the Australian government. The Australian Department of Health mandates that 25 per cent of all Commonwealth Supported Places (CSP), which are places in which the Australian government subsidizes university tuition costs, be set aside to be categorized as Bonded Medical Places. This policy aims to increase the number of doctors in areas with a shortage of trained doctors, though the restrictions placed on those bonded and the nature of agreeing to the scheme some 10 to 16 years prior to obtaining fellowship, make such returns of service difficult to complete. Bonded Medical Places are usually offered along with unbonded Commonwealth Supported Places (CSP) and Medical Rural Bonded Scholarships (MRBS).
