= Xander Pratt =

- Born: November 16, 1990 (age 35); Bulawayo, Zimbabwe
- Education: Deakin University, Melbourne, Australia
- Occupation: Art director
- Years active: 2011–present
- Known for: Interdisciplinary art
- Style: Avant-garde

Xander Pratt (born Kofi Michael Dumisani Osafo-Atta) is a Morocco-based Zimbabwean Avant-garde interdisciplinary artist, fashion designer, philanthropist, writer and entrepreneur.

== Background ==
Xander Pratt was born in Bulawayo, Zimbabwe in 1990 to a Ghanaian diplomat and a feminist writer from Zimbabwe. He spent his University years in Melbourne, Australia where he studied at Deakin University.

== Career ==
He began his career in Australia as a dancer and model in 2011. At the age of 18, he was discovered by fashion photographer, Peter Coulson in Melbourne, Australia at Dayglow, which was then the world’s biggest paint party. He then made a cameo appearance for the Australian mini satire comedy series, Angry Boys which starred Chris Lilley. During this period as a professional model, his career took off with the first 3-D campaign for the Australian brand Jay Jays as well as a collaboration with Cielo Magazine New York in the body painting industry in Australia.

In 2016, Xander garnered attention after his photoshoot for South African Men’s Fashion Week entitled “Reconcilable Differences” which captured innate differences between cultures and religions. In 2020, he was commissioned for a 12-piece photographic series called The Essence of Africa which captured the African soul and it was part of the Contemporary African Art Fair. In 2021 he became the first black person on the cover of Hola! Magazine in Morocco. He then art-directed The Tales of Andalusia the first joint shoot for Fatima Zahra-Khayat, Miss Universe Morocco and Sarah Loinaz, Miss Universe Spain.

Musically Xander Pratt began with his debut collaboration track titled “Going In,” featuring Matt Sofo, and it made it to the Top 30 of the Australian Aria charts, as well as “Punch tha House,” with Indonesian singer Angger Dimas who was signed to Steve Aoki.

Xander is Founder and CEO of Anticip8 and through the company in collaboration with Asia TV, he launched Asia Africa Art Academy at the International Youth Centre Malaysia. In 2023, he launched a Nomadhood in Africa platform in partnership with a South African entrepreneur Thandile Fikeni.

In collaboration with the Asian African Youth Government, Asian Youth Council and Pan African Youth Union, he has been a speaker during functions such as the Global South Day and International Day of the Girl. In addition, he has been a resource speaker about resilience for One Africa and UNICEF, as well as the African Youth Summit, which was commissioned by His Excellency, the King of Morocco and he has been a facilitator for the UNESCO Dreamcenter and UNESCO Artist for Peace initiatives. He also co-produced and directed a theatre for the African Union US Congress summit entitled "The African Dream" held in Morocco.

He hosted a dual Art Exhibition with Wafaa Mezouar at Dar Souiri in Essaouira, for the foundation of Andre Azoulay after which he showcased his solo “New World” Collection at the CreatiVerse Exhibit, where permanent installations remain at the Islamic World Cultural Educational and Scientific Organization headquarters in Rabat, as a tribute to the UN Conference on Climate Change held in Sharm El Sheikh, Egypt.

In 2023, Xander launched his first solo exhibition in the Philippines called The Lost Tablets which encircled the seas of Sulu from the Ifugao Mountain Province using contemporary, abstract surrealism to communicate themes about identity and freedom.

Xander Pratt is managed by Asia TV studios owned by Regine Guevara which sits as UNESCO international theatre institute secretariat in the Philippines, Morocco and Brazil.

== Awards and recognition ==
In 2020, Xander Pratt was listed by CNN as one of the top 10 most Avant Garde artists in Africa. In 2023, he was awarded as Artist of the year with the patronage of International Youth Centre in Malaysia. His global south tour is co-hosted by Earthsavers UNESCO Artists for Peace, where he was awarded by Gawad Pilipino as Ambassador of Tourism Culture and Peace. and first ever Afro-Asia Dato by the Manubu royalty of Cotabato. He has been on the cover of Experience Travel and Living Magazine and Alike Magazine, promoting eco-tourism and the creative industries.

== Discography ==
=== Albums ===
- DIDO
- Fireflies: Follow the Magic

=== Singles ===
- Oh Hell Yeah
- Casablanca
- Bills Paid
- Feminine Energy
- Balloons
- Way up
- Oxyfire
