= Rox De Luca =

Australian visual artist (born 1963)

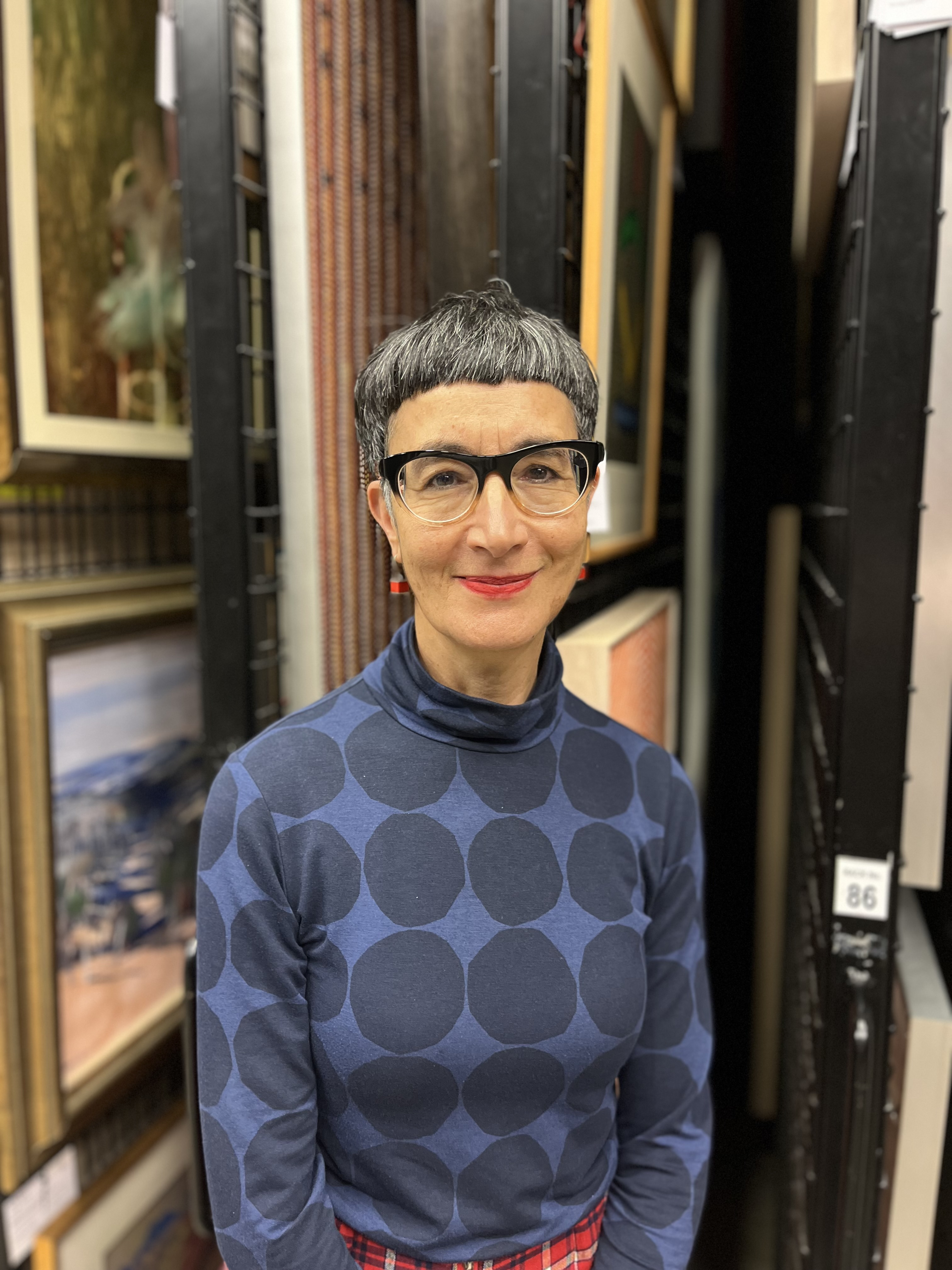
- Education: Canberra School of Art; University of New South Wales
- Occupation: Visual artist

Rox De Luca is an Australian visual artist whose work examines environmental issues and sustainability through sculpture and public art, predominantly made from found plastics. Her work is held by multiple national and regional collections, including Artbank, Deakin University Art Collection (Victoria), New England Regional Art Museum (New South Wales), and Edith Cowan University (Western Australia), and at Royal Perth Hospital (Western Australia), and University of Sydney Union (New South Wales).

== Early life and education ==
De Luca attended the Canberra School of Art and has a Bachelor of Arts degree (Visual). She also holds a Graduate Diploma in Arts Administration from the University of New South Wales.

== Art work and career ==
De Luca's early practice was influenced by her Italian migrant background. She investigated histories of migration and the cross-cultural impact of everyday objects like kitchen implements and personal items such as a collection of Italian needlework patterns her mother gave to her, and painted portraits.

Since the early 2010s, De Luca's work has focused on the concepts of abundance, excess and waste, and the ethics of living sustainably. Her studio practice involves collecting kilos of plastic waste debris from the shores of local beaches such as Bondi Beach or Rose Bay in Sydney, guided primarily by colour. At her studio the plastics are sorted and threaded using strings of wire into sculpture works that speak to consumption, abundance, plastic pollution and waste.

In 2022 De Luca contributed work to the artist's collective Project Vortex, an international collective of artists and creatives who work to address the problems of plastic pollution.

De Luca has exhibited in museums and galleries in Australia and Europe including Museum of Sydney, Australian National Maritime Museum, Fremantle Arts Centre, Arts Project Australia, Canberra School of Art, Bondi Pavilion, China Cultural Centre Sydney, Campbelltown Arts Centre, and Espacio Menosuno, Madrid.

Her work is represented in the archive of the Women's Art Register.

== Recognition and awards ==
De Luca has been a finalist in a number of art prizes, including the Deakin University Contemporary Small Sculpture Award in 2018, and again in 2024, the Ravenswood Australian Women’s Art Prize (2017), and the Fisher’s Ghost Art Award, Campbelltown Arts Centre (2021), and won the GreenWay Art Prize, Environmental Art and Design Prize (2021).

She was on the judging panel of the City of Ryde Sustainable Waste to Art Prize in 2020.

De Luca has received multiple artist-in-residence opportunities, including the City of Waverley (NSW) Artist Studios, and the inaugural artist in residence at Orlebar Brown (2024), the Gunyah Residency Program, the Woollahra Gallery at Redleaf, NSW (2022) and the Fremantle Arts Centre (2019).

In 2025, De Luca was one of nineteen artists featured in the work Recirculate: Experiments in sustainable practice by 19 Australian artists by Tracey Clement.

== Selected solo exhibitions ==
Solo exhibitions include:

- 2021 - Chutespace, Canberra
- 2019 - Gleaning for plastic, on the beach, Art+Climate= Change, Loop, Melbourne
- 2013 - Sculpture by the Sea, Sydney
- 2012 - Saved, James Dorahy Project Space, Sydney

== Selected group exhibitions ==
Group exhibitions include:

- 2025 - Das Vertraute im Fremden - The Familiar in the Foreign, Munich, Germany
- 2024 - Colour is enough, Arts Project Australia, Melbourne
- 2024 - Beauty Runs the Gauntlet, Bondi Pavilion Gallery, Sydney
- 2023 - Plastic: Unwrapping the World, Wagga Wagga Art Gallery
- 2022 - Plastic-free Biennale Kandos, collaboration with Plastic Free Biennale, (Lucas Ihlein, Kim Williams, First Nations Sister GlitterNullius), Wayout, Kandos, NSW
- 2022 - Material Girl, China Cultural Centre, Sydney, curated by Nicholas Tsoutsas
- 2022 - Omnivores, Duckrabbit, Redfern, NSW
- 2021 - Hundreds and Thousands, Fremantle Arts Centre, Western Australia
- 2021 - On REvolution, Gallery Central, North Metro TAFE, Perth
- 2020 - Contour 556, Curated by Neil Hobbs, Canberra
- 2019 - The Art for the Wilderness, Queen Street Galleries, Woollahra, Sydney
- 2018 - Sentient Visibility, Grace Cossington Smith Gallery, Sydney
- 2010 - Más Razones, with Jo Darbyshire, Espacio Menosuno, Madrid
- 2003 - Italiani di Sydney, Museum of Sydney, Sydney
- 2001 - Stitches - Fare Il Punto, Australian National Maritime Museum, Sydney
- 1999 - Family Ties, 24HR Art, Darwin
- 1997 - 25 Reasons

== Collections ==
- Artbank, Australia
- Deakin University Art Gallery Collection, Victoria
- Edith Cowan University, Western Australia
- New England Regional Art Museum, NSW
- Royal Perth Hospital, Western Australia
- University of Sydney Union, NSW
- Private collections in Australia, Europe, and the United States

== Publications ==
- Luca, Rox De (2016-02-13). "Abundance, Excess, Waste". PORTAL Journal of Multidisciplinary International Studies. 13 (1). doi:10.5130/portal.v13i1.4793. ISSN 1449-2490.
- De Luca, Rox; Darbyshire, Jo (1999), 50 reasons / Rox De Luca [and] Jo Darbyshire, Fremantle, Western Australia: Fremantle Arts Centre Press, ISBN 0958814058
