= Caryl Nowson =

Australian scientist

Professor Caryl A. Nowson (PhD, APD) holds the Chair in Nutrition and Ageing in the School of Exercise and Nutrition Sciences at Deakin University, Melbourne, Australia. She is also the team leader of the "Healthy Growing, Healthy Ageing" group within the Centre for Physical Activity and Nutrition Research (C-PAN) at Deakin.

== Research interests ==
Professor Nowson has a longstanding research interest in nutrition and diet related to chronic diseases, ageing and bone health. She has conducted a number of studies evaluating the dietary factors associated with hypertension and osteoporosis.

Professor Nowson and co-workers' report "Vitamin D and health in adults in Australia and New Zealand: a position statement" has prompted discussion on the need for the government to increase the amount of vitamin D into food supply.

In addition, Professor Nowson is conducting research to evaluate the salt intake among school children and raise the awareness of the need to develop strategies to reduce the salt consumption for the benefit of children's health in the long term.

Professor Nowson's recent studies also investigate the relationship between Body Mass Index (BMI) and risks of mortality of adults over the age of 65.

== Awards and organization ==
- 2005: Inaugural chairperson and one of the founders establishing the Australian Division of the World Action group on Salt and Health (AWASH)
- 2009: Awarded the Nutrition Society of Australia Medal for excellence in research.
- Deputy Chair of the National Committee for Nutrition of the Australian Academy of Science.
- Member of the Medical and Scientific Advisory committee of Osteoporosis Australia.
