= Deakin Business School =

Coordinates: 37°50′44″S 145°6′37″E

- Parent institution: Deakin University
- Location: Melbourne, Victoria, Australia

Deakin Graduate School of Business provides Deakin University's major postgraduate business programs covering Master of Business Administration, Master of Commerce, Master of International Business, Master of Marketing, and Doctor of Business Administration courses as well as Executive Development programs. A range of graduate certificate and diploma courses is offered as well.

Approximately 3000 students are engaged in higher degrees by coursework or research, and other courses at the business school.

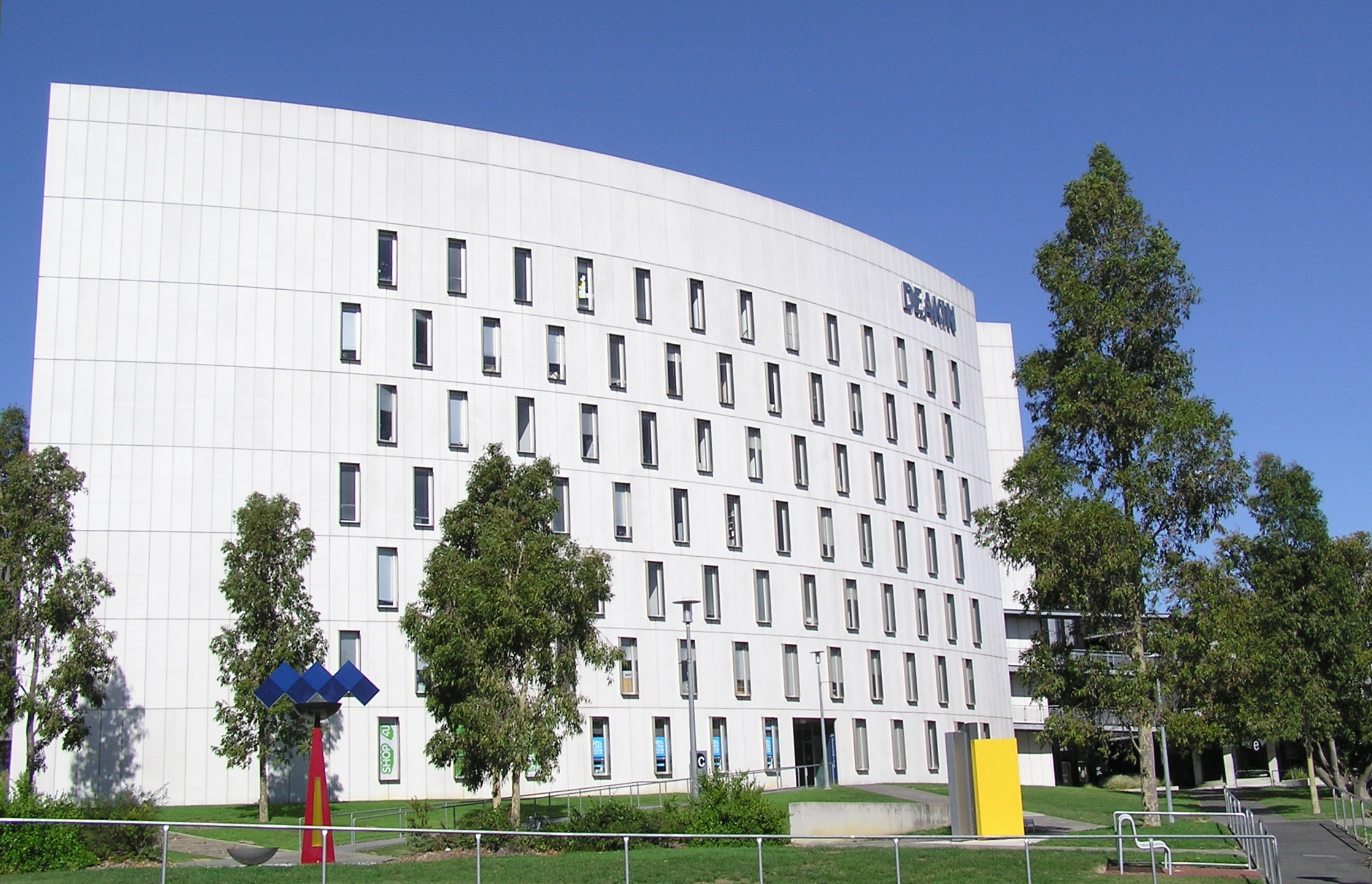
Deakin University

In each year since 2008, the Graduate Management Association of Australia (GMAA) awarded Deakin's generalist MBA course the maximum score of five stars, placing it in the top rank of Australia's MBA courses.

The vice-chancellor of the university is Professor Jane Den Hollander.
