= Sally-Anne McCormack =

Australian psychologist

Sally-Anne McCormack (left) 2015 Prerecording The Sally-Anne Show

Sally-Anne McCormack (born 12 March 1965) is an Australian clinical psychologist, former teacher and media commentator. She is the Founder and CEO of ANTSA Pty Ltd, an Australian digital mental health platform that supports practitioners in engaging, monitoring, and supporting clients between sessions through mood tracking, automated tasks, psychoeducation, and AI-assisted tools. ANTSA includes jAImee, the world's first AI therapy chatbot that can be overseen by practitioners to enhance client engagement and ensure clinical safety.

== Education ==
McCormack graduated from Monash University with a Masters in Psychology, as well as both ACU and Deakin University with teaching qualifications. She was endorsed as a Clinical Psychologist in March 2010.

== Career ==
McCormack filmed The Sally-Anne Show after creating TV pilots in both 2013 and 2014 for community television An article was written describing her varied career roles in The Sydney Morning Herald newspaper in 2015

McCormack is a consulting psychologist for Mother & Baby magazine. She is the founder of ANTSA Psychology ("Automatic Negative Thoughts - Strategies for All") and is the author of Stomp Out The ANTs - Automatic Negative Thoughts as well as Living With ANTs. In addition, she has created a poster titled "Which ANT Are You?" for children.

== Family ==
McCormack is a mother to four daughters; she lost a fifth daughter to Edwards syndrome in 1991.

== Publications ==
- Stomp Out The ANTs - Automatic Negative Thoughts book
- Which ANT Are You? poster
- Living With ANTs book
