= Deakin College =

Tertiary education provider in Australia

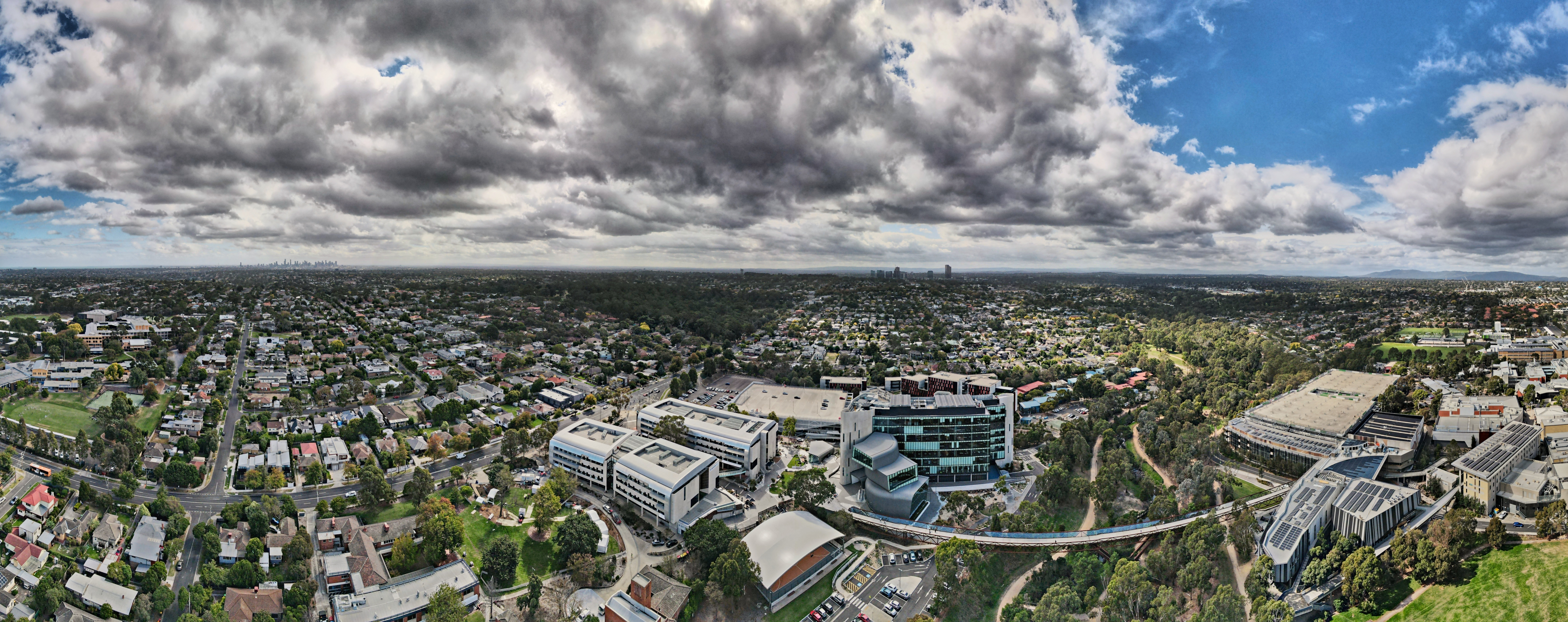
- Deakin College, at the Burwood campus of Deakin University, 2022
- Former names: Melbourne Institute of Business and Technology
- Type: Tertiary pathway provider
- Established: September 1996; 30 years ago
- Academic affiliations: Deakin University
- Campus: Urban and regional
- Language: English
- Website: deakincollege.edu.au

Deakin College is an Australian tertiary education provider. The College delivers Foundation program and diploma courses from Deakin University campuses at Burwood, in Melbourne and at Waurn Ponds and Waterfront in Geelong Victoria, Australia. In partnership with Deakin University since 1996, as of October 2020, over 22,000 students had transitioned from the College to the University.

== Overview ==
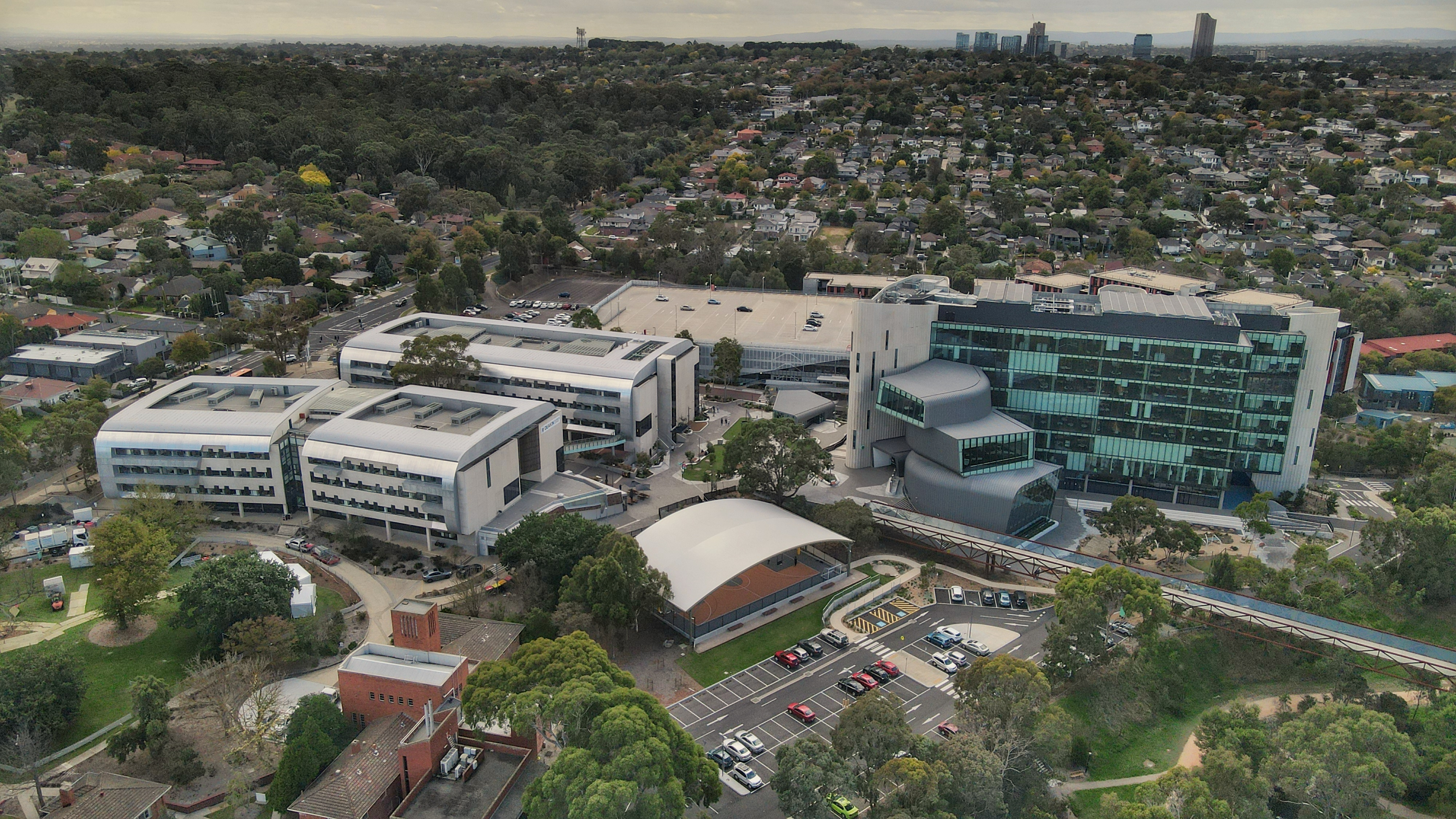
Deakin College, Burwood campus, 2022

Deakin College provides the Foundation program which is similar to Year 12, and university-level diplomas in the areas of business, commerce, communication, construction management, design, engineering, film, television and animation, health sciences, information technology, and science. The institute offers a pathway to Deakin University for students who do not meet the entry requirements for the University's courses or as a bridge between previous studies and university.

All courses are conducted on the University's campuses at either the Melbourne Burwood, Geelong Waterfront, or Geelong Waurn Ponds. Intakes are available three times each year: in March, June and October.

The diploma courses consist of eight units which are equivalent to the first year of the Deakin University undergraduate degree. This means that once students successfully complete the diploma and meet all requirements, they move into second year of the relevant university degree at Deakin University. The Masters Qualifying Program offered from 2008 to international students is a non-award program designed to provide a pathway to Deakin University's masters programs in business.

== History and philosophy ==
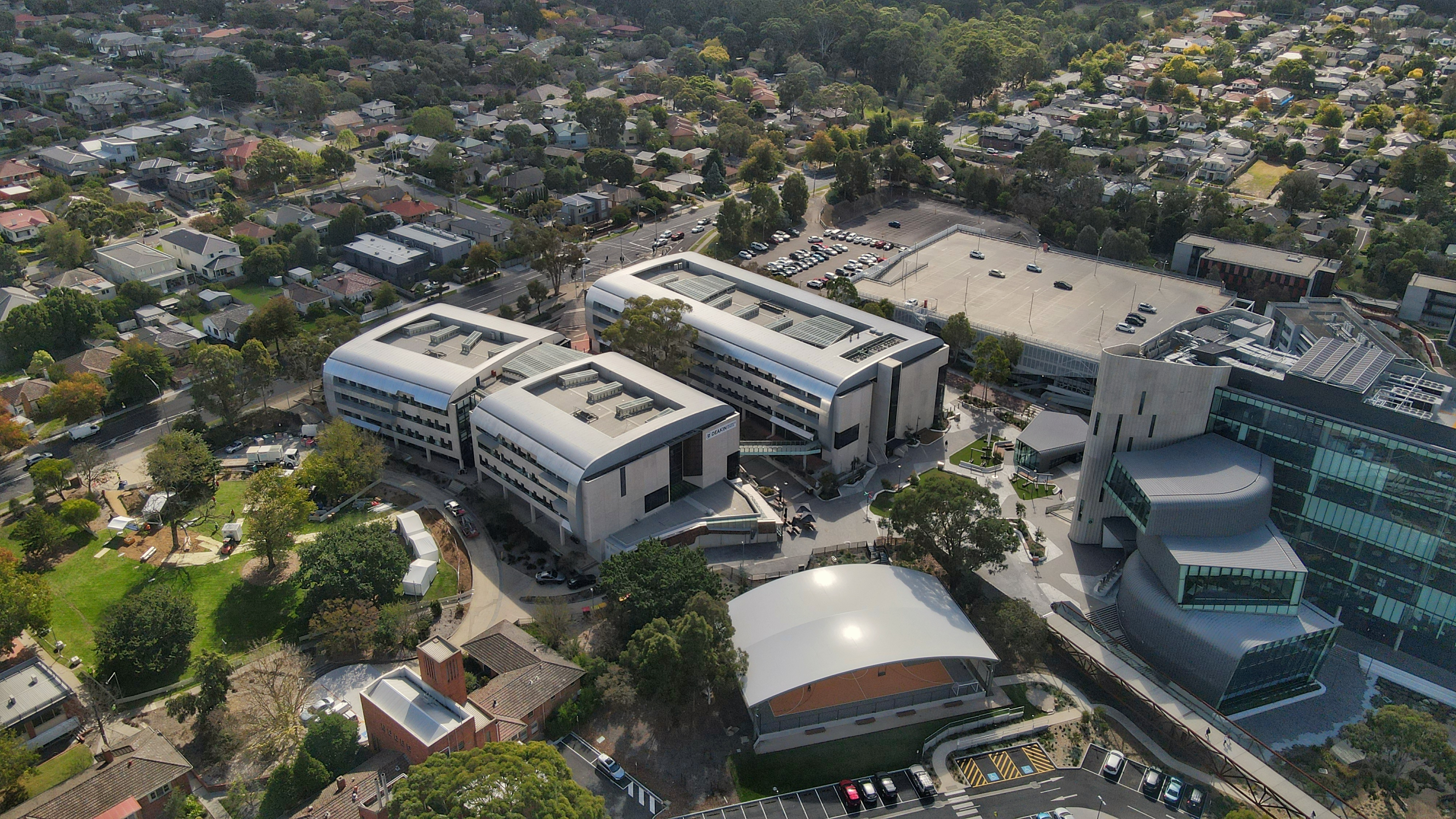
Deakin College, Burwood campus, 2022

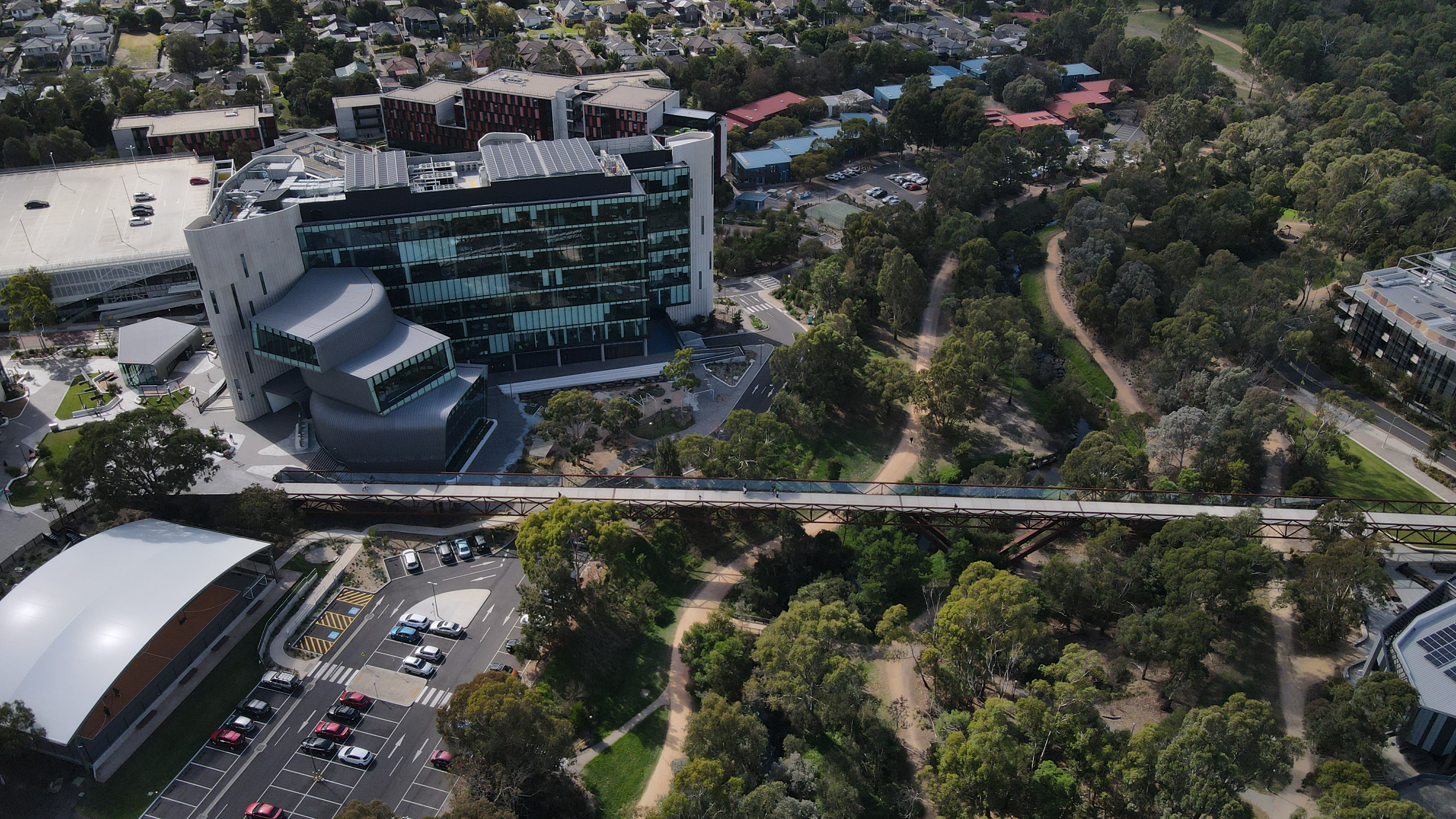
Deakin Bridge, Burwood campus, 2022

The Melbourne Institute of Business and Technology (MIBT) was established in September 1996 on Deakin University's former Toorak campus. At the time it was recognised to provide access to post secondary education for both Australian and international students who did not qualify for direct entry into university, yet who, in the right circumstances, had the capacity and motivation to complete a degree program.

In 2015, MIBT rebranded to Deakin College.

The College enables students to complete their studies more flexibly, for example if they wish to fast track (eight months) their course rather than do a regular university length course (12 months). The College is established at the Deakin Burwood campus, in Building LA, and at the Geelong campuses at Waurn Ponds, in Building KA and at Waterfront, in the Denny Laselles Building.
