= Holly High =

Australian anthropologist

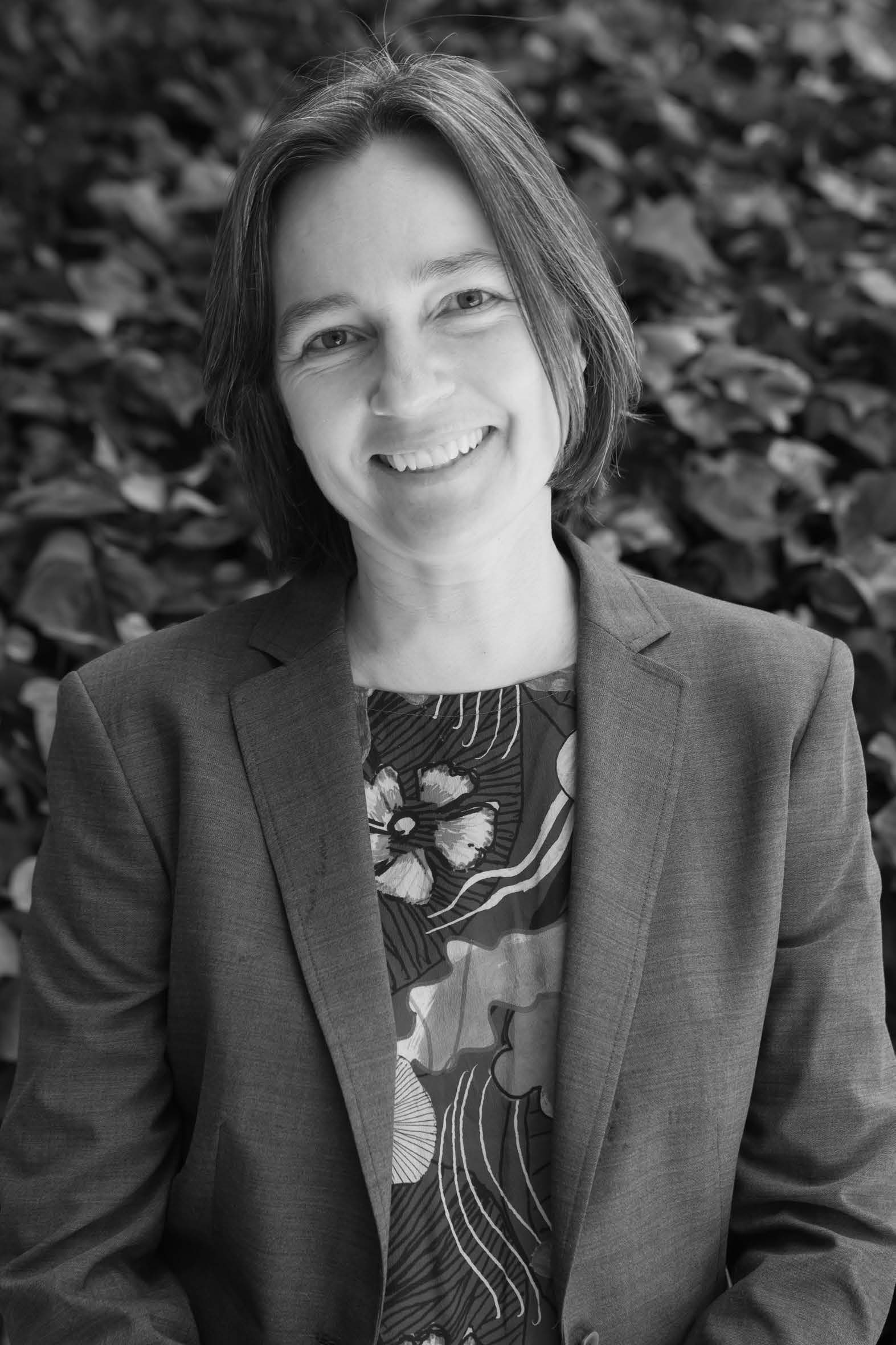
- Holly High at Deakin University
- Born: 1976 (age 49–50) near Nimbin, New South Wales, Australia
- Awards: ARC Discovery Early Career Research Award (2012); ARC Future Fellowship (2020)

Academic background
- Education: All Saints' College, Bathurst
- Alma mater: Australian National University
- Thesis: (2005)

Academic work
- Discipline: Anthropology
- Sub-discipline: Ethnography of socialism in Laos; gender; reproductive health; policy
- Institutions: Deakin University (2021–present); Yale University Program in Agrarian Studies (2005–2006); Clare Hall, Cambridge (from 2010)
- Notable works: Fields of Desire: Poverty and Policy in Laos (2015); Projectland: Life in a Lao Socialist Model Village (2021); As If Already Free (2026); Stone Masters: Power Encounters in Mainland Southeast Asia (2022)

Holly High (born 1976) is an Australian anthropologist specialising in the ethnography of socialist Laos. She is an associate professor at Alfred Deakin Institute for Citizenship and Globalisation.

== Biography ==
High was born in 1976 near Nimbin, New South Wales.

High conducted fieldwork in Laos, including language learning and documenting a bird flu outbreak. She was a research fellow at the Yale Program in Agrarian Studies (2005–2006) and at Clare Hall, Cambridge from 2010, later becoming a Life Member. She was awarded an Australian Research Council (ARC) Discovery Early Career Research Award in 2012 and an ARC Future Fellowship in 2020. In 2021 she joined Deakin University.

== Research ==
High's research focuses on the ethnography of socialism in the Lao People's Democratic Republic, with particular attention to gender, reproductive health, and policy. Reviewer Ian G. Baird of the University of Wisconsin–Madison has argued that High was the first scholar to seriously challenge the characterisation of Laos as postsocialist. She is also a public advocate for the discipline of anthropology, appearing regularly on podcasts and in interviews to discuss Lao politics and society. One reviewer described her prose as having notable literary quality.

== Notable works ==
- Politics, Holly HighSeries: New Southeast Asia:; Meaning; Memory (2021-10-05). "Projectland: Life in a Lao Socialist Model Village". UH Press.
- "Fields of Desire: Poverty and Policy in Laos". NUS Press. March 17, 2015.
- "As If Already Free". Pluto Press. June 16, 2026.
- "Stone Masters: Power Encounters in Mainland Southeast Asia". NUS Press. March 23, 2022.
