= Joan Hammond =

Australian operatic soprano, singing coach and champion golfer

Dame Joan Hammond DBE CMG
- Born: Joan Hilda Hood Hammond; 24 May 1912; Christchurch, New Zealand
- Died: 26 November 1996 (aged 84); Bowral, New South Wales, Australia
- Years active: 1936–1965

Dame Joan Hilda Hood Hammond, DBE CMG (24 May 1912 – 26 November 1996) was an Australian operatic soprano, singing coach and golfer.

== Early life ==
Joan Hilda Hood Hammond was born and baptised in Christchurch, New Zealand. She was the daughter of Samuel and Hilda (née Blandford) Hood. Her father, Samuel Hood, was born in England. He had married his first wife, Edith, then left her and took up with Hammond's mother, Hilda, with whom he also had two sons in England. Hood informally added "Hammond" to his name and the couple represented themselves as "Mr and Mrs Samuel H. Hammond" although they were not married at the time.

Born in May 1912, not long after the family had arrived in New Zealand, young Joan was six months old when her family moved again, to Sydney, New South Wales, Australia. Her parents finally married in Sydney on 25 May 1927, the day after her 15th birthday, although there is no evidence Samuel's first wife had died by that time, or that they had ever divorced. She attended Pymble Ladies' College and excelled in both sports and music. She studied violin and singing at the New South Wales State Conservatorium of Music in Sydney, and played violin for three years with the Sydney Philharmonic Orchestra before studying singing in Vienna in 1936.

== Golfer ==
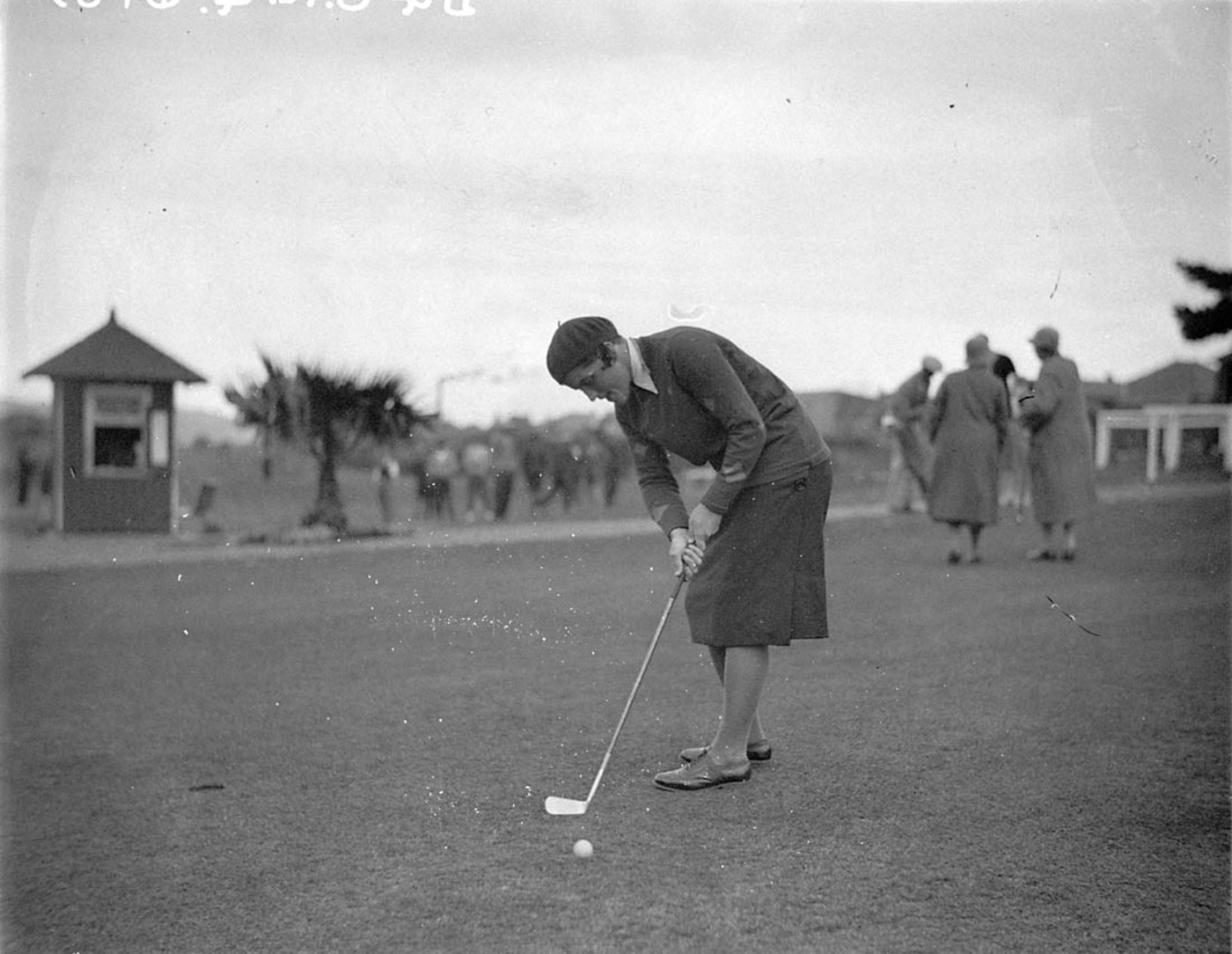
Joan Hammond putting

Hammond won the women's junior golf championship for New South Wales in 1929, and the New South Wales Women's Amateur Championship in 1932, 1934, and 1935. When she became well known as a golfer, she started to sign her name as "Joan Hood Hammond", and newspaper articles would sometimes hyphenate this as "Joan Hood-Hammond"; however, she later dropped the "Hood".

== Opera ==
An encounter with Lady Gowrie, the wife of the then Governor of New South Wales, Lord Gowrie, made Hammond's dreams of studying in Europe possible. She would often refer to Lady Gowrie as her "guardian angel". Hammond's fellow golfers in New South Wales raised enough money for her to leave Australia in 1936 to study in Vienna. She also studied with Dino Borgioli in London. She toured widely, and became noted particularly for her Puccini roles.

She returned to Australia for concert tours in 1946, 1949 and 1953, and starred in the second Elizabethan Theatre Trust opera season in 1957. She undertook world concert tours between 1946 and 1961. Her autobiography, A Voice, a Life, was published in 1970.

Dame Joan Hammond appeared in the major opera houses of the world – the Royal Opera House, La Scala, the Vienna State Opera and the Bolshoi. Her fame in Britain came not just from her stage appearances but from her recordings. She made famous the aria "O mio babbino caro" from Puccini's opera Gianni Schicchi. Recorded in English under the title "O My Beloved Father", it earned Hammond a Gold Record award for 1 million sold copies on 27 August 1969.

Her recording of "O, Silver Moon" from Dvořák's Rusalka was also a huge seller. A prolific artist, Hammond's repertoire also encompassed Verdi, Handel, Tchaikovsky, Massenet, Beethoven, as well as folk song, art song, and lieder.

== Later life ==
A heart attack in 1965 forced Hammond to retire from the stage. Her final performance was at the funeral of her "guardian angel", Lady Gowrie, on 30 July 1965, at St George's Chapel, Windsor Castle. This occasion was also memorable for the fact that Hammond was the first woman ever granted royal permission to sing in that chapel. She was interviewed for the BBC radio programme Desert Island Discs in 1970.

Hammond retired to Australia. She became patron and a life member of the Melbourne-based Victorian Opera Company (since 1976, the Victorian State Opera – VSO), founded in 1962 by Leonard Spira. She was the VSO's artistic director from 1971 until 1976 and remained on the board until 1985. Working with the then general manager, Peter Burch, she invited the young conductor Richard Divall to become the company's musical director in 1972. She joined the Victorian Council of the Arts, was a member of the Australia Council for the Arts opera advisory panel, and was an honorary life member of Opera Australia. She was important to the success of both the VSO and Opera Australia.

Hammond embarked on a second career as a voice teacher after her performance career ended. In 1975, she was appointed head of vocal studies at the Victorian College of the Arts, a post she held until 1989. In that time she trained an extraordinary number of Australian singers who had successful careers in Australia and on the international stage. Among her notable pupils are sopranos Helen Adams and Cheryl Barker, baritone Peter Coleman-Wright, and tenor Steve Davislim.

In 1983, her home at Aireys Inlet was destroyed by the Ash Wednesday bushfires and she lost all her possessions including the memorabilia of a lifetime.

== Death ==
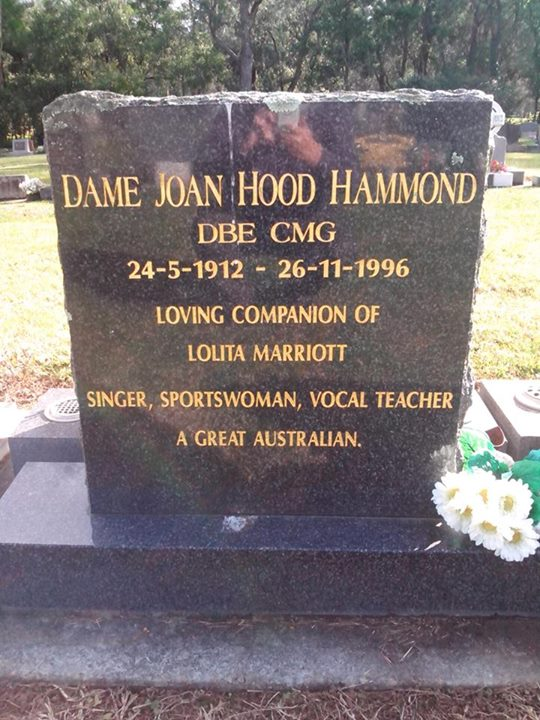
Hammond's grave in Bowral

She died in 1996 in Bowral, New South Wales, aged 84, and was buried in the Bowral Cemetery. Her long-time partner, Lolita Marriott, had pre-deceased her in 1993.

Cheryl Barker, Joan Carden and John Bolton-Wood sang at Hammond's memorial concert at the Melbourne Concert Hall, broadcast on ABC Classic FM.

== Awards and honours ==
In the Queen's birthday honours of 1953, she was appointed an Officer of the Order of the British Empire (OBE) for her singing.

In the Queen's Birthday Honours of 1963 she was promoted to Commander of the Order of the British Empire (CBE). She received the Sir Charles Santley memorial gift from the Worshipful Company of Musicians, London, in 1970.

In the Queen's New Year's Day Honours of 1972, she was made a Commander of the Order of St Michael and St George (CMG) for services to young opera singers. Two years later, in the Queen's Birthday Honours of 1974, she was promoted to Dame Commander (DBE) of the Order of the British Empire for distinguished services to music.

== Legacy ==
In 1986, the Victoria State Opera created the Dame Joan Hammond Award with Moffatt Oxenbould as its inaugural recipient.

In 1989, the Hammond residence at Deakin University was opened by her and named in her honour. A wing of a Pymble Ladies’ College boarding house is also named for her.

== Bibliography ==
- Hammond, Joan (1970). A Voice, a Life. London: Gollancz. ISBN 0-575-00503-3.
- Hardy, Sara (2008). Dame Joan Hammond: Love and Music. Crows Nest, New South Wales: Allen & Unwin. ISBN 978-1-74175-083-6.
