= John McFarlane =

British businessman (born 1947)

John McFarlane OBE FRSA
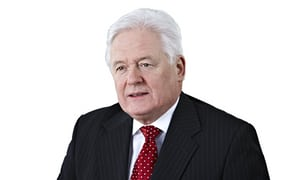
- Born: 14 June 1947 (age 79); Dumfries, Scotland
- Education: University of Edinburgh; Cranfield School of Management; London Business School

John McFarlane OBE FRSA (born 14 June 1947) is a British businessman. He served as group chairman of Barclays from 2015 to 2019. From 2020 to 2023, McFarlane served as Chairman of Westpac.

== Early life ==
He was born in Dumfries and attended Dumfries Academy. He was educated at the University of Edinburgh, Cranfield and the London Business School.

== Career ==
He began his career in manufacturing with Ford of Europe in 1969, subsequently having a career in banking. He spent eighteen years with Citibank, ultimately as head of Citibank in Ireland and the United Kingdom. In 1993, he became Group Executive Director of Standard Chartered Plc. based in London and Hong Kong. He was chief executive of the Australia and New Zealand Banking Group Ltd. (ANZ), one of Australia's leading banks, after a decade of service, during which time he turned around the financial performance of the bank, and spearheaded an effort, called "Breakout", to transform the Bank. He retired in 2007.

In October 2008, he joined the board of the Royal Bank of Scotland as a non-executive director. He was appointed to the board of Aviva plc in September 2011 and became chairman in July 2012. He was previously deputy chairman and chairman designate and became executive deputy chairman in May 2012. He was president of the International Monetary Conference (the annual meeting of the heads of the world's major banks and central banks) and was chairman of the Australian Bankers' Association. While in the United Kingdom, he was a member of the Bank of England Financial Law Review Panel; in 1992, he chaired The McFarlane Report - the review of "The Future Development of Auditing in the United Kingdom and Ireland". More recently, he served as a member of the governing body of the Economics Research Institute for the Association of South East Asian Nations & East Asia. In December 2013, he was appointed chairman of FirstGroup.

In September 2014, he was appointed chairman of Barclays and joined the board with effect from 1 January 2015. He was appointed executive chairman of Barclays in July 2015 until a permanent replacement could be found for their departing chief executive Antony Jenkins. He is also chairman of TheCityUK.

McFarlane contributed to an anthology of writing that was published in October 2018 and produced by Labour in the City, which examines the challenges facing the banking sector a decade after the 2008 financial crisis. In November 2018, Barclays announced that McFarlane was stepping down as chairman in May 2019.

In April 2020, McFarlane was appointed to the board of Westpac where he served as chairman until December, 2023.

== Personal life ==
Through his daughter Rebecca, McFarlane is the father-in-law of English broadcaster Richard Bacon.

== Honours ==
In the 1995 Birthday Honours, McFarlane was awarded the Officer of the Order of the British Empire (OBE) for "services to the Finance Industry". In 2001 he received the Centenary Medal for "service to Australian society in business leadership". He has also received banking and securities fellowships in the UK, Australia and Hong Kong, and is a Fellow of the Royal Society of Arts.

Business positions
Preceded by Don Mercer	Chief Executive Officer of ANZ Banking Group; 1997 – 2007	Succeeded by Mike Smith
Preceded by Sir David Walker	Group Chairman of Barclays; 2015 – 2019	Succeeded by Nigel Higgins
Preceded by Antony Jenkins (as Group Chief Executive)	Executive Chairman of Barclays; 2015	Succeeded by Jes Staley (as Group Chief Executive)
Preceded by Lindsay Maxsted	Chairman of Westpac Banking Corporation; 2020 – present	Incumbent
