= John Hay (academic) =

Australian academic

Professor John Hay AC
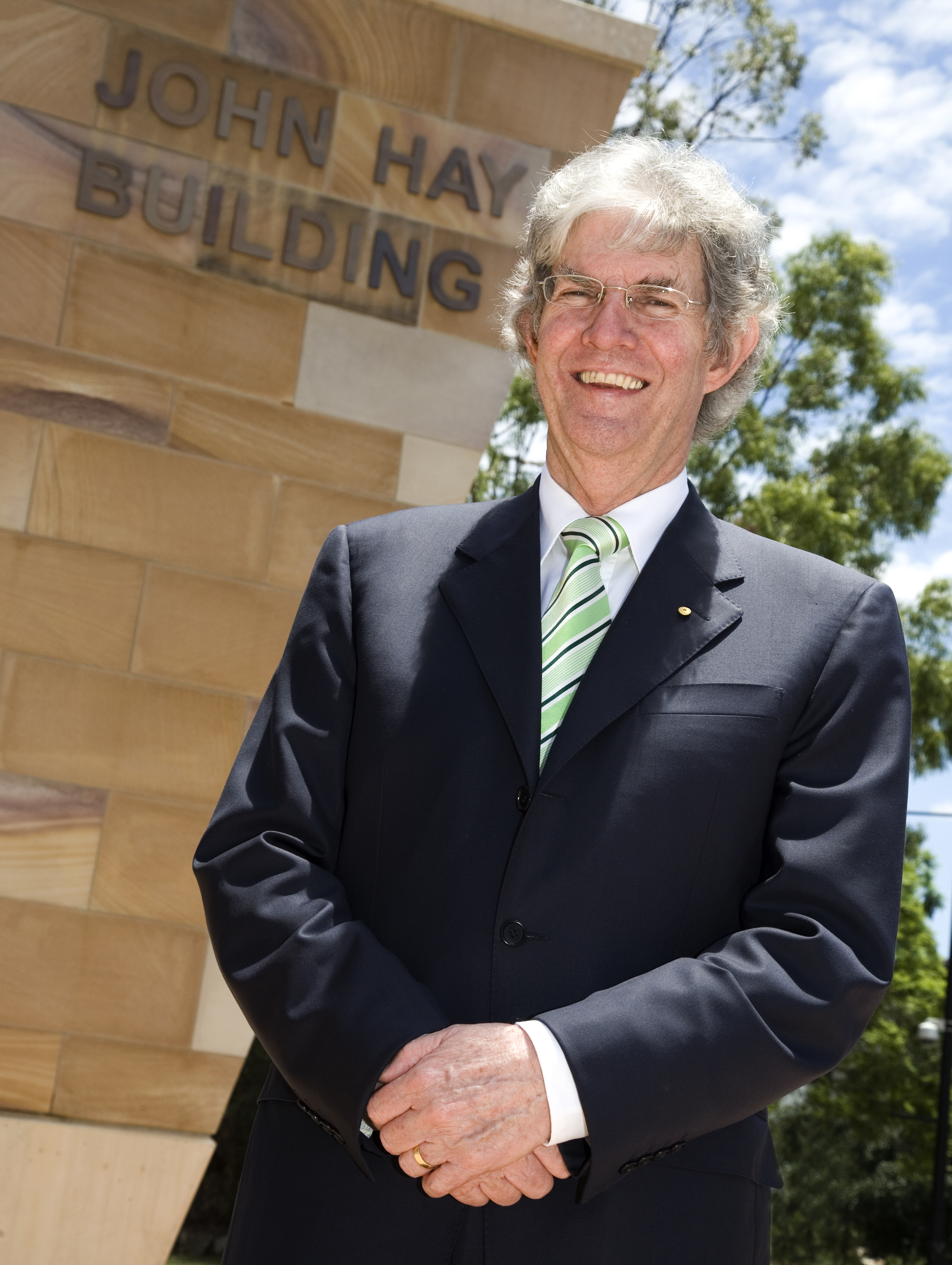
- John Hay, 2000

8th Vice-Chancellor of University of Queensland
- In office 1996–2007
- Preceded by: Brian Wilson
- Succeeded by: Paul Greenfield

3rd Vice-Chancellor of Deakin University
- In office 1992–1996
- Preceded by: Malcolm Skilbeck
- Succeeded by: Geoff Wilson

Personal details
- Born: John Anthony Hay; 21 September 1942 Western Australia
- Died: 3 November 2016 (aged 74) Melbourne, Victoria, Australia
- Profession: academic, administrator

Academic background
- Education: University of Western Australia; Cambridge University

Academic work
- Discipline: English literature
- Institutions: University of Western Australia; Monash University; Deakin University; University of Queensland

John Anthony Hay AC (21 September 1942 – 3 November 2016) was an Australian academic. He was Vice-Chancellor of Deakin University and the University of Queensland from 1996 to 2007.

== Early life ==
Hay was born on 21 September 1942 in Western Australia. He attended Perth Modern School.

== Education ==
Hay studied at the University of Western Australia and then at Pembroke College, Cambridge where he was a Hackett Research Scholar. He was awarded a B.A., M.A. and Ph.D., all in English literature.

== Academic positions ==
Hay held the following academic appointments:

- Chair of English and Head of the department in the University of Western Australia
- Dean of Arts and Chair of the National Key Centre for Australian Studies, Monash University.
- Senior Deputy Vice-Chancellor, Monash University, Australia from 1988 to 1991
- Vice-Chancellor and President, Deakin University, Australia from 1992 to 1995.
- Hay was Vice-Chancellor and President of the University of Queensland between 1996 and 2007
- Chair of Universitas 21, a consortium of comprehensive, research-intensive international universities in 2003.
- Chair of the Group of Eight between January 2002 and May 2003.
- Chair of the Carrick Institute for Learning and Teaching in Higher Education.

== Career highlights ==
In 1995, during his term as vice-chancellor at Deakin University, the university was named Australia's University of the Year by the Good Universities Guide.

In March 1998, during his term as vice-chancellor at the University of Queensland, Hay met with American businessman and philanthropist Chuck Feeney at the Irish Club in Brisbane to discuss fund raising for the university's research. Hay made an arrangement with the Queensland Premier, Rob Borbidge, that the Queensland Government would match the gift offered by Feeney to create a major biosciences precinct at the university. Although there was a change of government in Queensland in the June 1998 election, the new Premier, Peter Beattie, was also enthusiastic to support Hay's plans for the university as part of Beattie's Smart State initiative. With the support of Feeney and Beattie, Hay established the Institute for Molecular Biology, the Australian Institute for Bioengineering and Nanotechnology, the Queensland Brain Institute, the Centre for Clinical Research, and the Translational Research Institute. He also established sustainable mining and supercomputing research facilities.

During his tenure at the University of Queensland, he led initiatives to improve the aesthetics of the university campus with many of the new buildings receiving architectural awards. He established the UQ Centre, a multifunctional building which can be used for a wide range of academic, cultural and sporting events, such as graduation ceremonies, exhibitions, conferences and banquets. As Mayne Hall was then no longer needed for graduations, Hay used funding from Feeney's Atlantic Philanthropies, to refurbish Mayne Hall as the James and Mary Emelia Mayne Centre Art Gallery, Australia's first national collection of artists' self-portraits.

In 1999, The University of Queensland was named Australia's University of the Year by the Good Universities Guide. Under Hay's leadership, The University of Queensland advanced to second position in Australia for total competitive research funding.

== Later life ==
Hay retired from the University of Queensland in December 2007. He died on 3 November 2016 in Melbourne, Victoria.

== Honours ==
- Centenary Medallist in 2001 for contributions to Australian higher education.
- Companion of the Order of Australia in the 2004 Australia Day Honours.
- Honorary doctorates from 5 universities
