= Barton College (Deakin University) =

- Deakin University
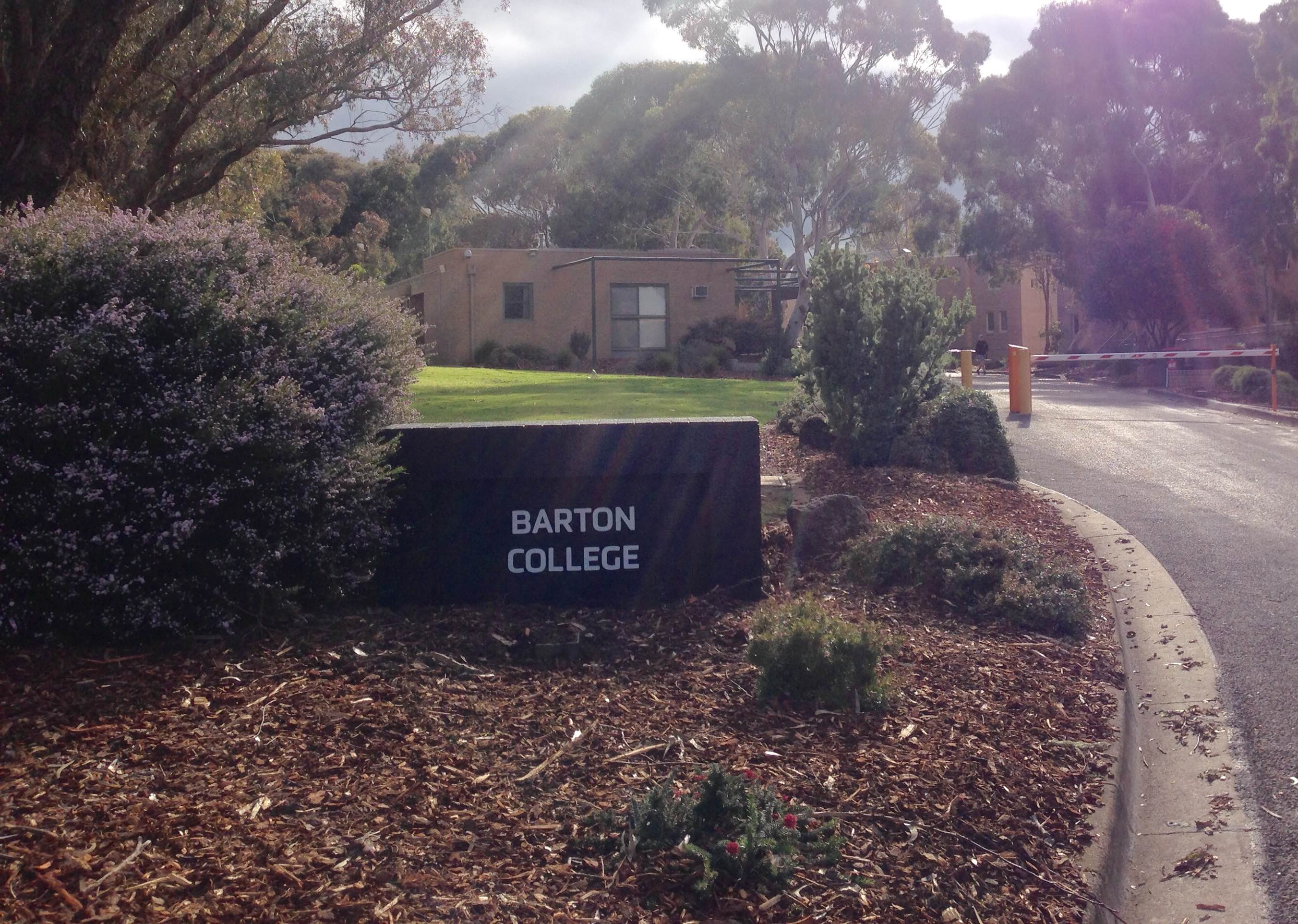
- Barton College entrance in 2017 (with Common Room in background)

- Location: Baxter Drive, Deakin University, Waurn Ponds, Geelong
- Coordinates: 38.199293°S 144.301387°E
- Established: 1989
- Named for: Sir Edmund Barton
- Residents: Dawson; Evatt; Hammond
- Mascot: The Barton Boar

Barton College is a residential college located at the Waurn Ponds campus of Deakin University. Established in 1989, the college is a residence made up of the Dawson, Evatt, and Hammond buildings.

Initially, the college had staff and acted as a community (competing in sporting events, purchasing matching rugby tops). Additionally, each year the 'Boar of the Year' was awarded until 2003. The college also published an annual BarTalk until 1994, when the Bartonian was published for one year.

Previously, the Barton Common Room was filled with plaques, photos and awards attributed to the college. However, the re-painting of the building and lack of College activities led to the building featuring only a single Boar shield and the 'Boar of the Year' plaque. Services also include a pool table, air hockey table, and four tennis courts.

In 2017, for the annual Deakin Residence Football matches and college merchandise Barton College became known as the 'Barton Bulls'.

== Residences ==
=== Current residences ===
- Dawson - named after baritone Peter Dawson (opened April 9, 1990)
- Hammond - named after Dame Joan Hammond (opened April 28, 1989)

=== Former residences ===
- Evatt - named after Dr. Herbert Vere Evatt (became part of the Alfred Deakin College in August 2017)

== See also ==
- Alfred Deakin College (Deakin University)
