= John Skilbeck =

Australian cricketer (born 1958)

Personal information
- Full name: Andrew John Skilbeck
- Born: 21 July 1958 (age 68); Sydney, Australia
- Source: ESPNcricinfo, 1 February 2017

John Skilbeck (born 21 July 1958) is an Australian cricketer. He played nine first-class and three List A matches for New South Wales between 1981/82 and 1982/83.

== See also ==
- List of New South Wales representative cricketers
