= Alfred Deakin College (Deakin University) =

- Deakin University
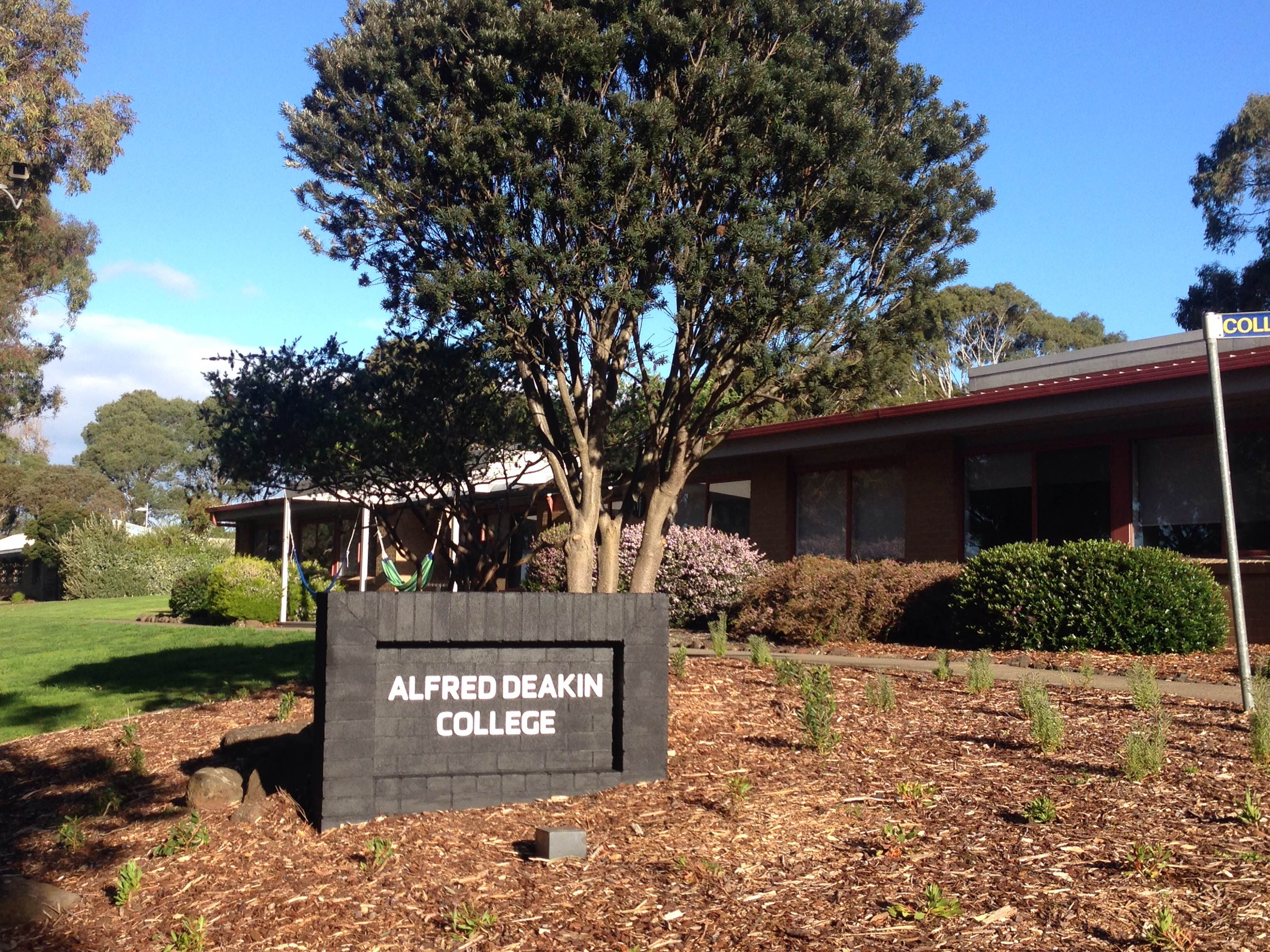
- Alfred Deakin College entrance in 2017 (with Boyd Unit in background)

- Location: Residence Road, Deakin University, Waurn Ponds, Geelong
- Coordinates: 38.199463°S 144.299194°E
- Established: 1973
- Named for: Alfred Deakin
- Residents: Boyd; Collins and Laird; Evatt; Gordon; Wookey
- Mascot: The Deakin Duck

Alfred Deakin College (formerly Deakin College) is a residential college at the Waurn Ponds campus of Deakin University. The first of the Deakin colleges, it came to be in 1973 when the Gordon Institute Council (one of the councils responsible for the development of the University) formed a committee to oversee the construction of the original two unit blocks; the Collins and Laird units.

Between 1977 and 1985, the Wookey, Boyd, and Gordon Units (respectively) were constructed in the Deakin College. The Percy Baxter Common Room (opened in 1982) facilitates the college, named after Percy Baxter Charitable Trust, whom financed the building.

In 2017, the college became officially known as Alfred Deakin College rather than Deakin College, and the Evatt Units, formerly of the Barton College, joined the college.

== Residences ==
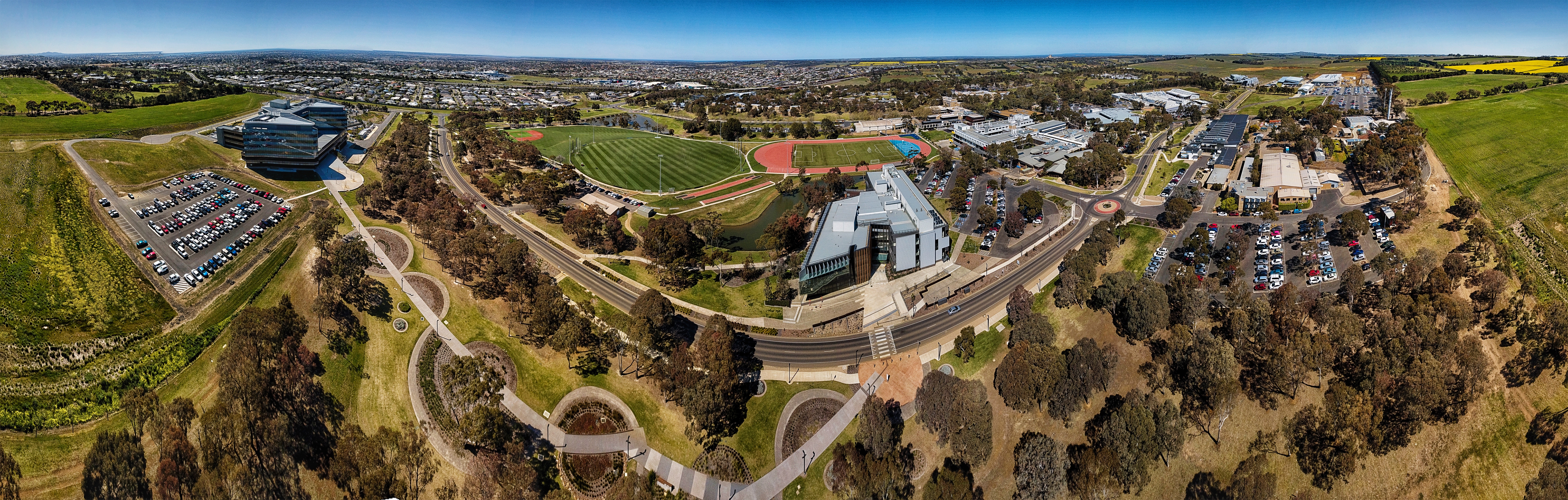
Aerial panorama of Deakin University's Waurn Pond Campus. Shot at altitude of 110m. September 2018.

- Boyd - named after David Boyd, the last Principal of the State College of Victoria, Geelong (opened 1982)
- Collins and Laird - named after Arthur Collins, head of the Gordon Institute’s Architecture Department, and Ewen Laird, a member of the Gordon Institute Council (opened 1973)
- Evatt - named after Dr. Herbert Vere Evatt (joined from Barton College in 2017)
- Gordon - named after Charles George Gordon (opened 1985)
- Wookey - named after Don Wookey, Manager of Shell and President of the Gordon Institute of Technology Council (opened 1977)

== See also ==
- Barton College (Deakin University)
