= Jane den Hollander =

Australian university administrator

Professor Jane den Hollander AO
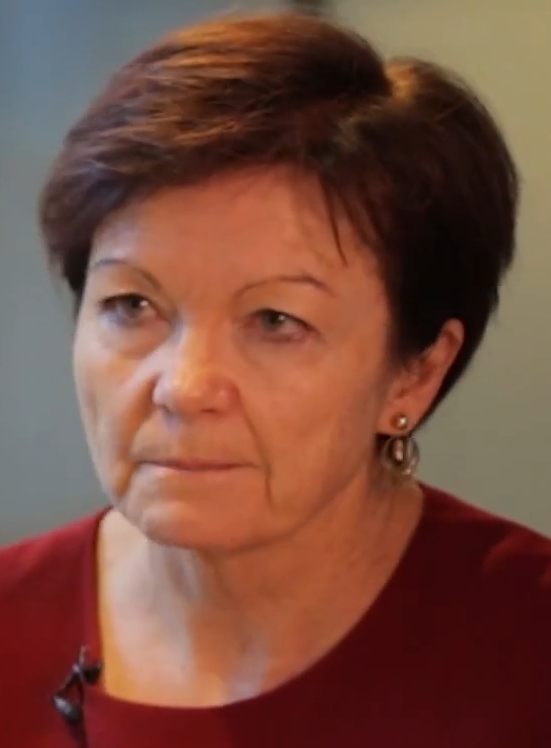
- Jane den Hollander in 2015

6th Vice-Chancellor of Deakin University
- In office 2010–2019
- Preceded by: Sally Walker
- Succeeded by: Iain Martin

Personal details
- Born: Mufulira, Zambia
- Profession: Biologist, administrator

Academic background
- Education: Wits University; University of Wales

Academic work
- Discipline: Biology
- Sub-discipline: Cellular biologist
- Institutions: University of Western Australia; Curtin University

Jane Elizabeth den Hollander AO is an Australian university administrator and was the sixth Vice-Chancellor of Deakin University. Den Hollander served as the Interim Vice Chancellor of Murdoch University. She also held this role at the University of Western Australia.

== Background and early career ==
Den Hollander was born in Zambia and grew up in a small South African gold mining town. Her father was a miner from Northern Ireland, and her mother was from Liverpool, England. She is the eldest of four children and the first member of her family to attend university. Her academic achievements include a Bachelor of Science in zoology with first class honours, and a Master of Science from Wits University. She did her PhD at the University of Wales on the topic of early stem cell work. Her subsequent academic career focussed on cellular biology, biochemistry and stem cell research.

== Career ==
Den Hollander is the architect of LIVE the future a strategic intent that aspires for Deakin University to capitalise on new and emerging technologies and drive the digital frontier in higher education. She previously held senior management positions at the University of Western Australia and Curtin University as Deputy Vice-Chancellor.

Den Hollander was a board member of Universities Australia, Education Australia Limited, and UniSuper, a member of the advisory board of the Office of Learning and Teaching, and a trustee of the Geelong Performing Arts Council.

From 2005 to 2008, den Hollander was a board member of Graduate Careers Australia, and from 2008 to 2011 on the board of the Australian Learning and Teaching Council.

In the 2017 Australia Day Honours, den Hollander was appointed an Officer of the Order of Australia for "distinguished service to tertiary education through a range of executive administration and advisory roles, as a supporter of professional educational organisations, and to the community". She was inducted onto the Victorian Honour Roll of Women in 2019.

== Personal life ==
In South Africa she met her future husband, a biologist from Western Australia with whom she has two children. The family returned to Perth in 1996.
