= Malcolm Skilbeck =

Academic (1933–2022)

Malcolm Skilbeck AO

2nd Vice-Chancellor of Deakin University
- In office 1986–1991
- Preceded by: Frederic Jevons
- Succeeded by: John Hay

Personal details
- Born: Malcolm Preston Skilbeck; 22 September 1932 Northam, Western Australia, Australia
- Died: 17 June 2022 (aged 89) near Geelong, Victoria, Australia
- Citizenship: Australian and British
- Spouse: Elizabeth Eileen Skilbeck (nee Robbins) married 1955 divorced 1980s
- Children: Ruth, Clare, Paul, Lucy
- Profession: Academic, administrator
- Spouse: Helen Connell married 1984
- Children: Brigit

Academic background
- Education: University of Sydney; University of Illinois; University of London

Academic work
- Discipline: Education
- Institutions: University of Ulster; University of London

Malcolm Preston Skilbeck AO 1932-2022. Malcolm Preston Skilbeck AO (22 September 1932 – 17 June 2022) was an Australian British educator who worked in international educational policy analysis, curriculum, tertiary and secondary education, the teaching profession and educational innovation. Some of this work was done with the Organisation for Economic Co-operation and Development (OECD) and the United Nations Educational, Scientific and Cultural Organization (UNESCO).

Born on 22 September 1932 in Northam, Western Australia, Skilbeck was educated at North Sydney Boys High School, he received his B.A. from the University of Sydney, his M.A. from the University of Illinois, his Ph.D. from the University of London, and he was awarded an Honorary Doctorate, Doctor of Letters, DLitt, from the National University of Ireland. He published many papers, articles, books and reports on academic issues such as curriculum theory and development, educational policy and youth training, in the secondary and tertiary sectors. He authored the books Loving and Studying Nature: Celebrating the Earth Through History, Culture and Education (2021); School Based Curriculum Development (1985); The Vocational Quest (1994); and The University Challenge: A Review of International Trends and Issues with Particular Relevance to Ireland (2002); co-authored the Curriculum Reform and the influential survey Industry-university partnerships in the curriculum: trends and developments in OECD countries (1996). His significant contributions included his work done in Ireland.

In the 2014 Australia Day Honours, Skilbeck was made an Officer of the Order of Australia (AO).

With his first wife, Elizabeth (nee Robbins), he had four children, Ruth, Clare, Paul and Lucy; and with his second wife, Helen Connell, he had one child, Brigit. Skilbeck died at the age of 89 on 17 June 2022.

== Positions held ==
- Professor and Dean of Education, University of Ulster, from 1971 to 1975
- Consultant Centre for Educational Research and Innovation (CERI) in Paris and as a participant in its European programs
- Director of the Australian Curriculum Development Centre from 1976 to 1981
- Director of Studies of the Schools Council for Curriculum and Examinations for England and Wales from 1981 to 1983
- Professor of Curriculum Studies at the Institute of Education, University of London, from 1981 to 1985
- Vice-chancellor and president, Deakin University, Australia, from 1986 to 1991
- Deputy Director for Education of the Directorate for Education, Employment, Labour and Social Affairs in the Organization for Economic Cooperation and Development (OECD) in Paris
- Consultant to UNESCO and the British Council
- Fellow of the Academy of Social Sciences in Australia
