= Deakin University =

Public university in Melbourne, Australia

- Former names: Gordon Institute of Technology (1887–1977); Geelong State College (1950–1977); Victoria College and antecedent institutions (1921–1991)
- Type: Public research university
- Established: 1887 (antecedent); 1974 (as university)
- Accreditation: TEQSA
- Affiliations: Australian Technology Network (ATN)
- Budget: A$1.37 billion (2023)
- Visitor: Governor of Victoria
- Chancellor: Claire Higgins
- Vice-Chancellor: Iain Martin
- Faculty: 1,880 (FTE, 2023)
- Administrative staff: 2,639 (FTE, 2023)
- Total staff: 6,051 (2023)
- Students: 58,853 (2023)
- Undergraduates: 38,815 (2023)
- Postgraduates: 17,198 coursework (2023); 2,236 research (2023)
- Other students: 604 non-award (2023)
- Location: 221 Burwood Highway, Melbourne, Victoria, 3125, Australia
- Campus: (All campuses) 450 hectares (4.5 km^{2}); Suburban and regional with multiple sites
Colours
Turquoise, teal and pink
- Nickname: Dragons
- Sporting affiliations: UniSport; EAEN
- Mascot: Dextor the Dragon
- Website: deakin.edu.au

Deakin University is a public research university in the state of Victoria, Australia. Its largest campus is in Victoria's state capital Melbourne, with regional campuses in Geelong and Warrnambool. The university was named after Alfred Deakin, the early Prime Minister of Australia and a founding father of Australian Federation.

The university's foundation dates back to the opening of the Gordon Memorial Technical College in 1887, later renamed as the Gordon Institute of Technology in 1921. It's higher education portion merged with the Geelong campus of the State College of Victoria in 1974 to form Deakin University.

As of 2024, Deakin University is ranked among the top 1% of universities in the world, with some of its disciplines ranked within the world's top 100. Deakin Business School has accreditation from the Association to Advance Collegiate Schools of Business and EQUIS.

Deakin University consistently ranks highly in student satisfaction. Deakin has had the highest undergraduate student satisfaction ratings and in the top two for highest postgraduate student satisfaction out of all Victorian universities every year since 2010.

== History ==
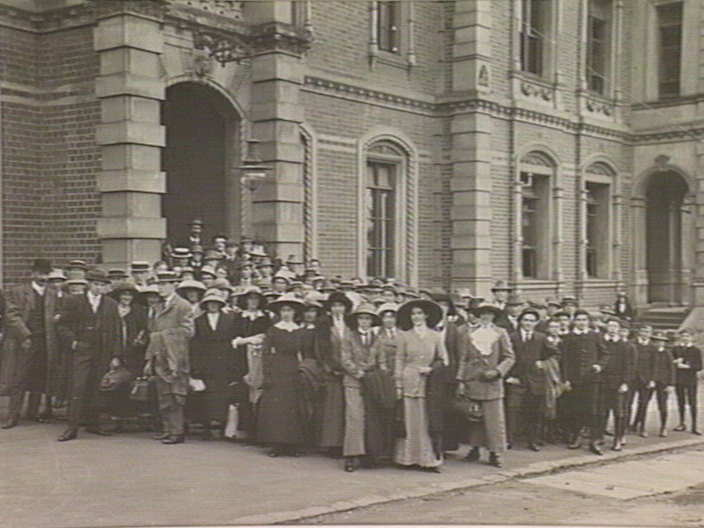
The Gordon Technical College circa 1910, the predecessor of Deakin University

Deakin University was established as a merger between State College of Victoria, Geelong (formerly Geelong Teachers College), and the higher education courses of the Gordon Institute of Technology, which originally opened in 1887 as the Gordon Memorial Technical College. The vocational part of the Gordon continues separately as the Gordon Institute of TAFE.

Deakin University was formally established with the passage of the Deakin University Act 1974 (No. 8610). Deakin University's first campus was established at Waurn Ponds, previously a campus of the Gordon Institute of Technology.

The Burwood campus is on the site of the former Burwood Teachers' College (established in 1954). That college began by conducting two-year training courses for primary school teachers, and three year courses for infant teachers (females only).

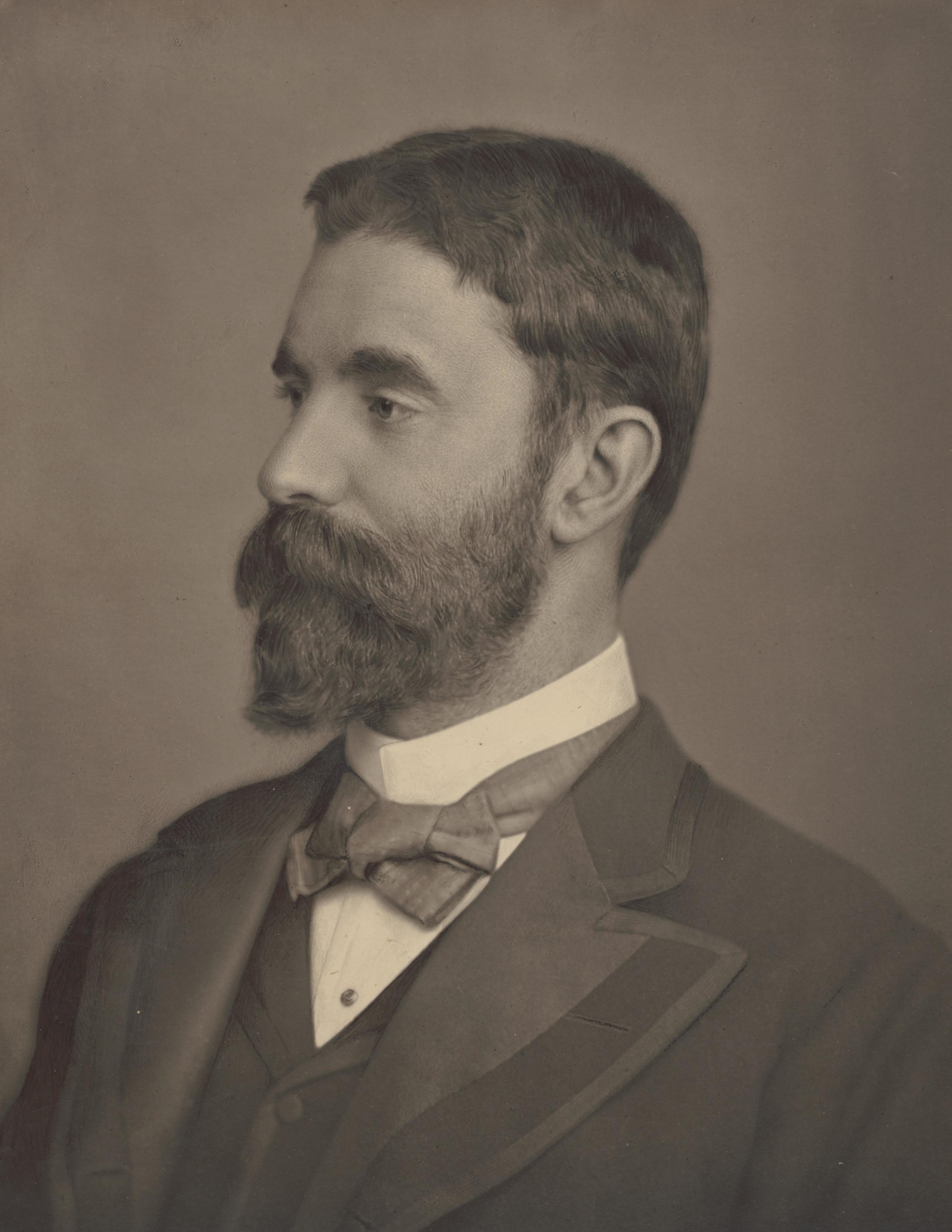
Alfred Deakin (1856–1919), Prime Minister of Australia

As part of the Dawkins education reforms that were announced in 1988 by the Commonwealth government, a merger with Warrnambool Institute of Advanced Education took place in 1990, which was followed by a merger with most of Victoria College in 1991, including its campuses in Burwood, Malvern and Clayton.

The former Toorak Campus, located in Malvern, was offered for sale in 2006 as the university considered the campus surplus to its requirements. The courses and resources were relocated to the Melbourne Burwood campus in November 2007. As a Deakin campus, it was home to the Deakin Business School, Deakin University English Language Institute (DUELI), and the Melbourne Institute of Business and Technology, which have now become the Deakin College.

The main building on the site was the 116-year-old Stonnington Mansion The sale of Stonnington Mansion by Deakin provoked public outrage as it involved the mansion which was at risk of redevelopment by property developers. The Stonnington Stables art gallery and the university's contemporary art collection were located here, but has since relocated to the Deakin University Art Gallery at the Melbourne Burwood campus. The Deakin University Art Gallery has a wide collection of work by Australian artists including the Sydney based artist Rox De Luca. The university's action of offering the campus, including the mansion, provoked public outrage over the potential privatization of what had been public space. In December 2006, the three-mansion was sold for $33 million to a joint venture between Hamton Property Group and Industry Superannuation Property Trust.

== Campuses and buildings ==
=== Melbourne Burwood Campus ===
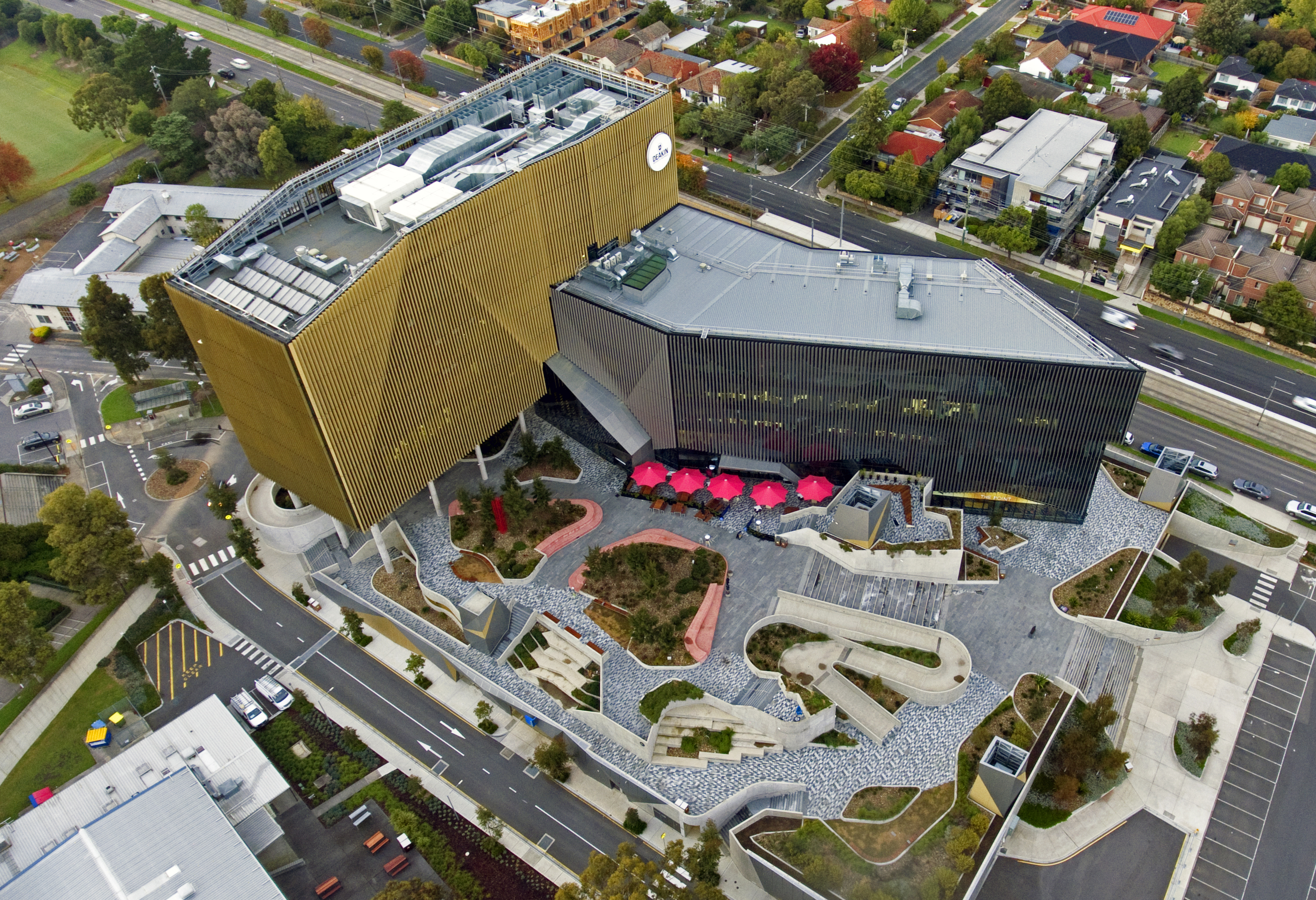
Building BC in Burwood

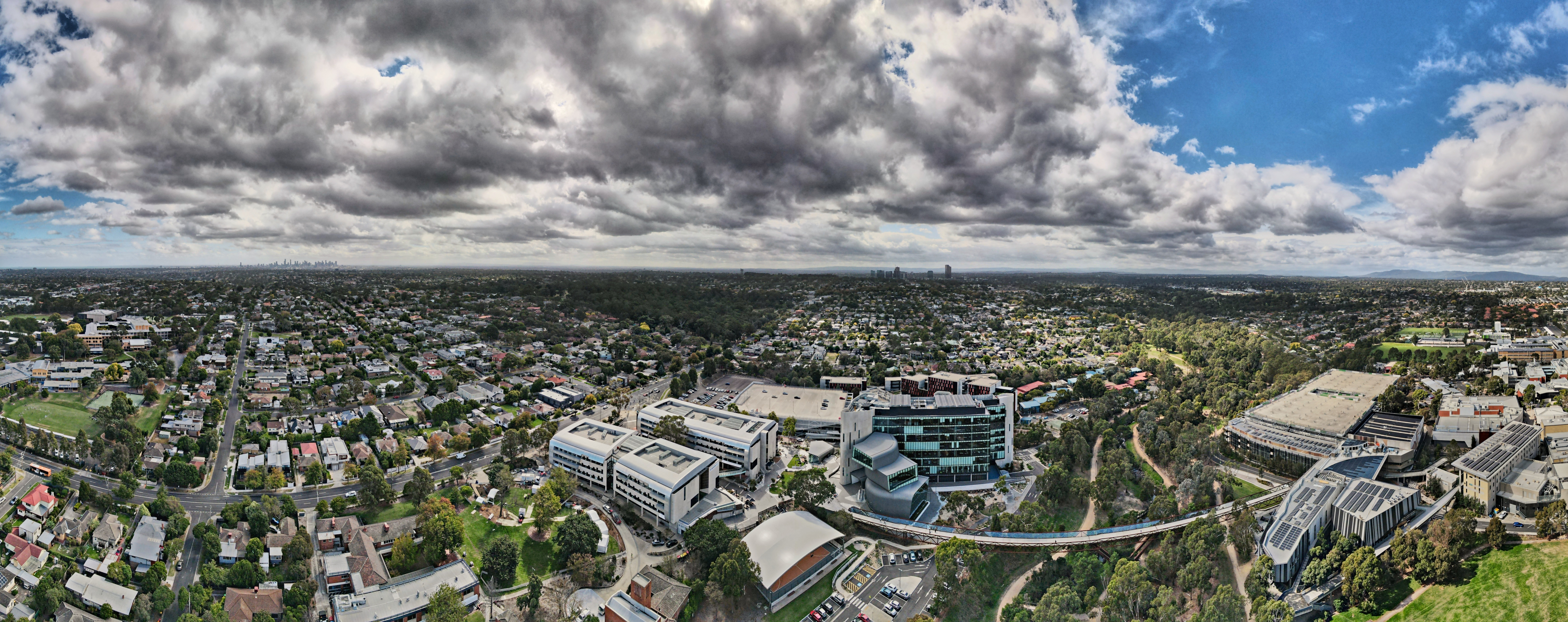
Deakin College panorama with Box Hill and Melbourne CBD on the horizon (March 2022)

The university's largest campus is in Burwood (37.8479°S 145.1143°E), about 45 minutes by tram (route 75) from the Melbourne CBD. Located alongside Gardiner's Creek parklands between Elgar Road on the north-west border and Mount Scopus Memorial College on the east border. The campus has around 31,975 (2020) undergraduate and postgraduate on-campus students. A recent addition to the Burwood campus in 2021 was the law building, designed by Australian architecture firm Woods Bagot. This building was awarded first place, gold at the 2022 WAN Awards.

=== Waurn Ponds Campus ===
The original campus of Deakin University (38.1979°S 144.2973°E) is located in the regional city of Geelong in the suburb of Waurn Ponds, 72 kilometres south west of Melbourne. The campus, serviced by the Princes Highway and the Geelong Ring Road. It has a student population of more than 8,382 (2020).

The campus is home to the Geelong Technology Precinct, which provides research and development capabilities and opportunities for university–industry partnerships and new enterprises in the region. The Elite Sports Precinct is home to the Deakin Ducks Football Club, and is used by the Geelong Football Club as an alternate training facility.

The Waurn Ponds Deakin Residence houses 800 students in shared dorms, shared units, town houses and studio apartments.

The residence is made up of Alfred Deakin College, Barton College, and Parkes College.

The Deakin University School of Medicine was opened by the then Prime Minister of Australia Kevin Rudd in 2008. Deakin's Doctor of Medicine (M.D.) is a four-year, graduate-entry program, which requires students to complete a Bachelor’s degree (of at least three-year duration) before entry, together with GAMSAT/MCAT test and a medical MMI interview. Course entry is highly competitive with more than 3600 domestic applicants indicated Deakin as a preference for 130 MD places in 2023-2024 via GEMSAS, making it one of the most applied-to medical schools in Australia. Clinical education of the MD program can be completed at one of the clinical schools in Melbourne and regional Victoria.

=== Warrnambool Campus ===
The Warrnambool Campus (38.3906°S 142.5373°E) was created in 1990 when the university absorbed the Warrnambool Institute of Advanced Education. It is situated on the banks of the Hopkins River in the coastal city of Warrnambool, close to local surf beaches and popular tourist attractions in close proximity to the Great Ocean Road and The Twelve Apostles. The 94-hectare (230-acre) site is approximately 5 kilometres (3.1 mi) from the Warrnambool CBD, serviced by the Princes Highway and by its own railway station, and bus services from Melbourne and Geelong, as well as locally in Warrnambool between the campus and the city.

There is an on-campus student population of around 1135 students pursuing courses in arts, business, education, environment, health sciences, law, management, marine biology, nursing and psychology.

=== Geelong Waterfront Campus ===
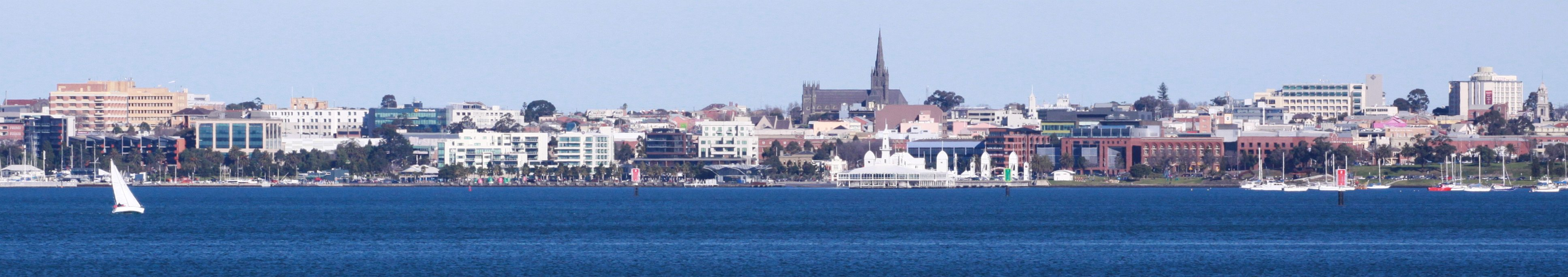
Geelong Waterfront Campus, overlooking Corio Bay, with Cunningham Pier in the foreground

The Geelong Waterfront Campus (38.1439°S 144.3603°E) is Deakin's newest campus, located on Corio Bay, in the central business district of Geelong. Originally built as the Dalgety's Woolstores in 1893, the buildings have been extensively renovated.

More than 5,362 (2020) students are based at the Geelong Waterfront Campus, which hosts the schools of Architecture and Built Environment, Health and Social Development, Psychology, and Nursing and Midwifery, as well as the Faculty of Business and Law.

A $37 million redevelopment of the Dennys Lascelles Building has increased the capacity of this campus, allowing the university to provide an expanded range of courses. The building houses the Alfred Deakin Prime Ministerial Library and the Alfred Deakin Institute.

This campus houses Costa Hall, a 1422-seat concert auditorium, which is used for the university's graduation ceremonies and is part of Geelong Arts Centre.

== Governance and structure ==
=== University Council ===
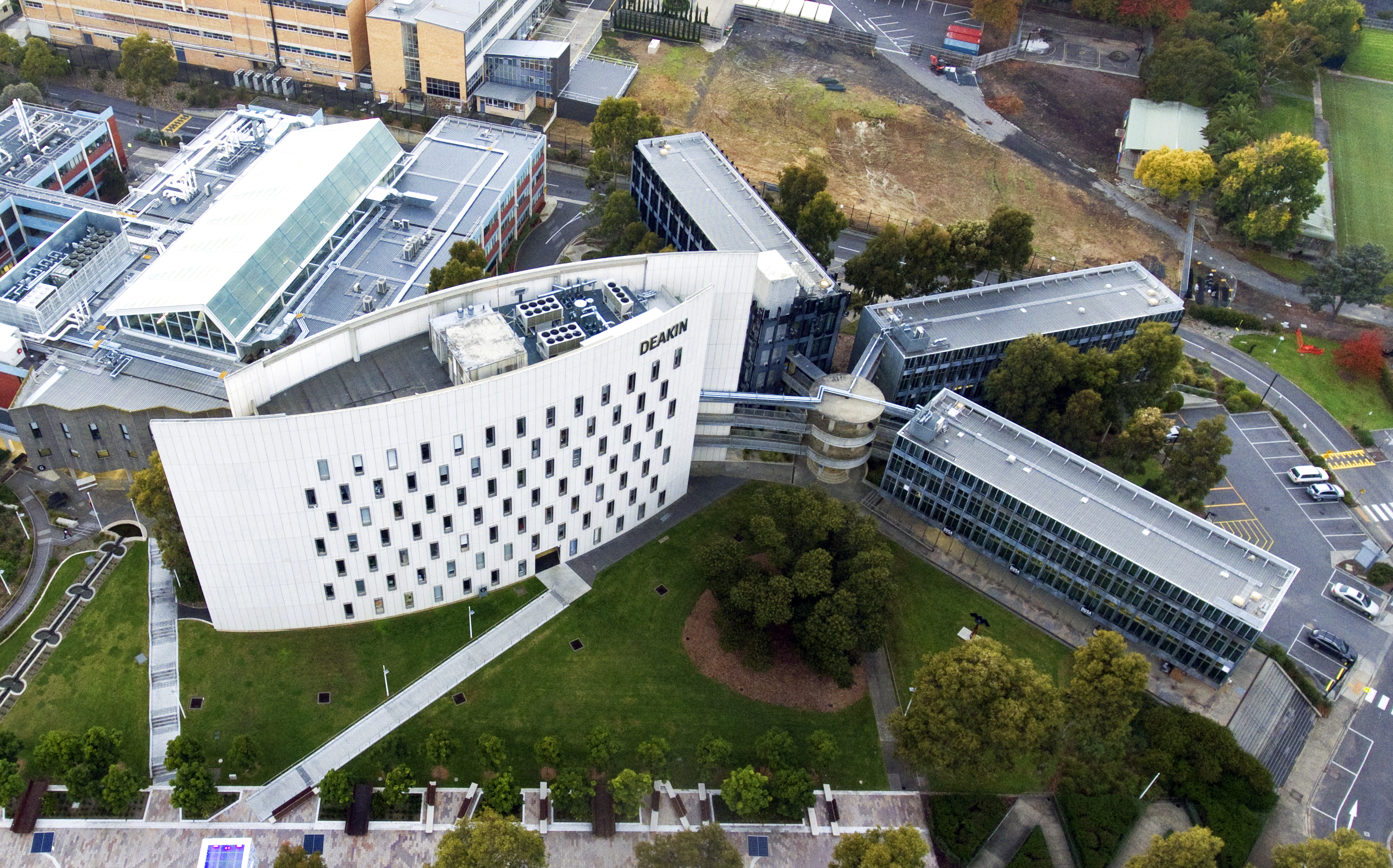
Aerial photo of Deakin University's Building C in Burwood

The Deakin University Council is the governing body of the university and is chaired by the chancellor, Claire Higgins. The council is responsible for the general direction and oversight of the university and is publicly accountable for the university's actions. The vice-chancellor is the chief executive officer of the university and is responsible to the council. Professor Iain Martin was vice-chancellor and president of Deakin University and Deakin's 7th vice-chancellor until his resignation (effective immediately) on June 9, 2026.

==== Chancellors and Vice-Chancellors ====
===== Chancellors =====
- 1978-1982 – Peter Thwaites
- 1983-1986 – Austin Asche
- 1987-1996 – Jim Leslie
- 1997–2005 – Richard Searby
- 2006–2016 – David M. Morgan
- 2016–2025 – John Stanhope
- 2026-present - Claire Higgins

===== Vice-Chancellors =====
- 1977–1985 – Frederic Jevons
- 1986–1991 – Malcolm Skilbeck
- 1992–1996 – John A. Hay
- 1997–2002 – Geoff Wilson
- 2003–2010 – Sally Walker
- 2010–2019 – Jane den Hollander
- 2019–9 June 2026 – Iain Martin
- 9 June 2026- present - Matthew Clarke (Caretaker Vice-Chancellor)
- 7 October 2026- present - Susan Elliott (Acting Vice-Chancellor)

=== Faculties and departments ===
The university is divided into four faculties, covering arts and education, business and law, health, and science, engineering and built environment. Within the Faculty of Arts and Education the three schools cover education, social sciences, humanities, communication and the creative arts. The Institute of Koorie Education also falls under the Faculty of Arts and Education. The Faculty of Health has the School of Medicine, along with schools covering nursing and midwifery, exercise and nutrition sciences, psychology, and incorporates subjects such as occupational therapy, social work, and health economics into the School of Health and Social Development. The Deakin University School of Law and the Deakin Business School both fall under the Faculty of Business and Law, and the Faculty of Science, Engineering and Built Environment encompasses architecture, information technology, engineering, and life and environmental sciences.

==== Constituent schools ====
- Deakin Business School
- Deakin Law School
- School of Architecture and Built Environment
- School of Engineering
- School of Information Technology
- Deakin University School of Medicine
- School of Nursing and Midwifery
- School of Life and Environmental Sciences
- School of Communication and Creative Arts
- School of Education
- School of Humanities and Social Sciences

== Academic profile ==
=== Research divisions ===
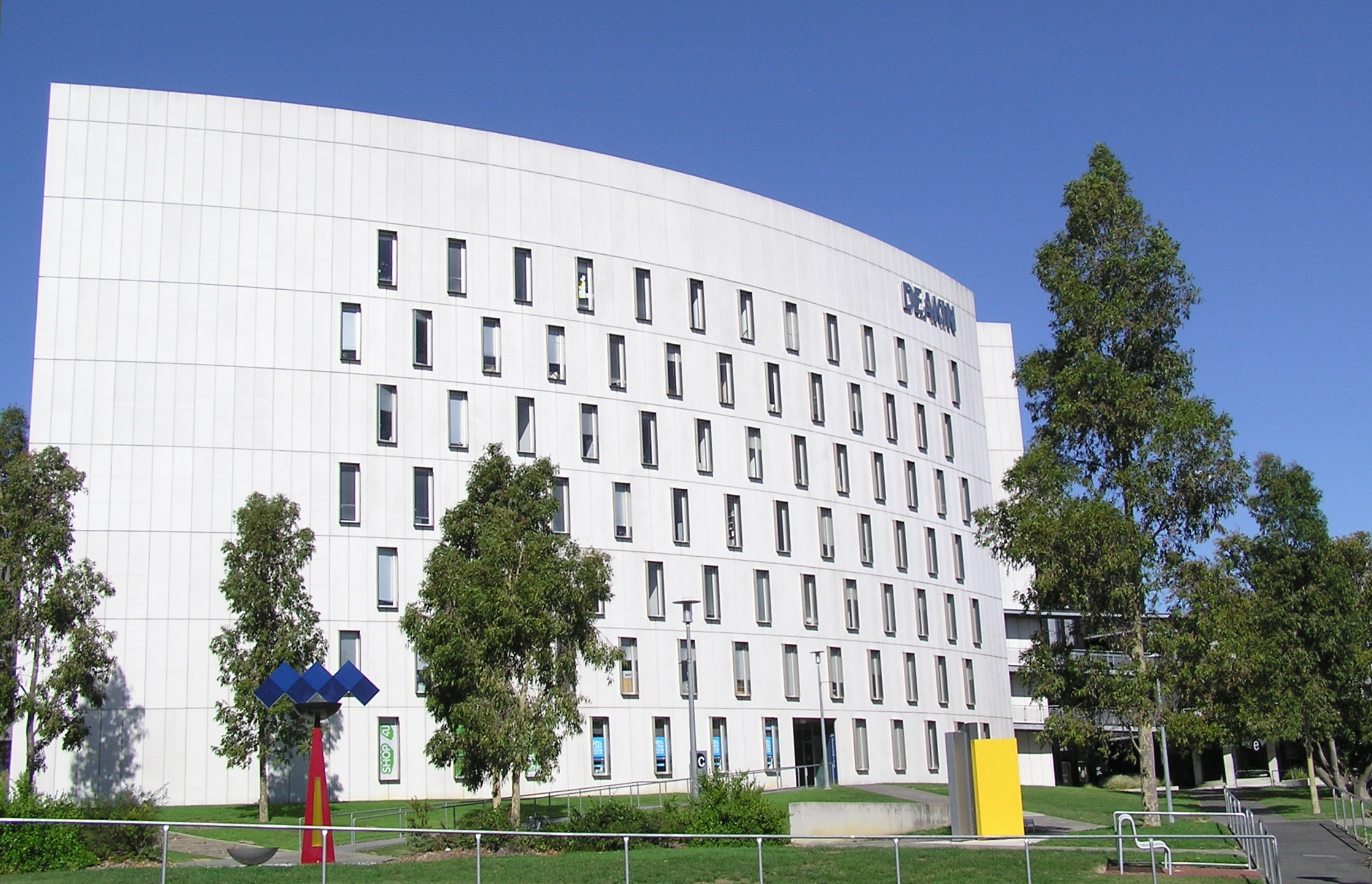
The Alfred Deakin Institute for Citizenship and Globalization (ADI) is housed in Building C of Deakin University's Burwood Campus

The university has seven research institutes:

- Alfred Deakin Institute for Citizenship and Globalization (ADI);
- Applied Artificial Intelligence Institute (A²I²);
- Institute for Frontier Materials (IFM);
- Institute for Health Transformation (IHT);
- Institute for Intelligent Systems Research and Innovation (IISRI);
- Institute for Mental and Physical Health and Clinical Translation (IMPACT); and the
- Institute for Physical Activity and Nutrition (IPAN).

There are also 6 Strategic Research and Innovation Centres (SRICs):

- Centre for Integrative Ecology (CIE);
- Centre for Cyber Security Research and Innovation (CSRI);
- Centre for Social and Early Emotional Development (SEED);
- Centre for Regional and Rural Futures (CeRRF);
- Centre for Sports Research (CSR); and
- Research for Educational Impact (REDI).

=== Libraries and archives ===
The Alfred Deakin Prime Ministerial Library is named after the early Australian Prime Minister and statesman, Alfred Deakin (1856–1919), and provides opportunities for research and learning.

=== Academic reputation ===
University rankings

Global – Overall
- ARWU World: 201–300 (2026)
- QS World: 227 (2027)
- THE World: 218 (2027)
- USNWR Global: 142 (26/27)

National – Overall
- ARWU National: 9–12 (2026)
- QS National: 14 (2027)
- THE National: 11 (2027)
- USNWR National: 10 (26/27)
- AFR National: =10 (2025)

In the 2024 Aggregate Ranking of Top Universities, which measures aggregate performance across the QS, THE and ARWU rankings, the university attained a position of #196 (12th nationally).

National publications

In the Australian Financial Review Best Universities Ranking 2025, the university was tied #10 amongst Australian universities.

Global publications

In the 2027 Quacquarelli Symonds World University Rankings (published 2026), the university attained a position of #227 (14th nationally).

In the Times Higher Education World University Rankings 2027 (published 2026), the university attained a position of #218 (tied 11th nationally).

In the 2026 Academic Ranking of World Universities, the university attained a position of #201–300 (tied 9–12th nationally).

In the 2026-2027 U.S. News & World Report Best Global Universities, the university attained a position of #142 (10th nationally).

=== Student outcomes ===
The Australian Government's QILT (Note: Abbreviation for Quality Indicators for Learning and Teaching.) conducts national surveys documenting the student life cycle from enrolment through to employment. These surveys place more emphasis on criteria such as student experience, graduate outcomes and employer satisfaction than perceived reputation, research output and citation counts.

In the 2023 Employer Satisfaction Survey, graduates of the university had an overall employer satisfaction rate of 84.2%.

In the 2023 Graduate Outcomes Survey, graduates of the university had a full-time employment rate of 80.1% for undergraduates and 90% for postgraduates. The initial full-time salary was A$69,300 for undergraduates and A$98,100 for postgraduates.

In the 2023 Student Experience Survey, undergraduates at the university rated the quality of their entire educational experience at 81.1% meanwhile postgraduates rated their overall education experience at 81.2%.

== Notable people ==
=== Notable alumni ===
- Emma Alberici, journalist/presenter with the ABC
- Phillip Aspinall, Primate of the Anglican Church in Australia: MBA
- Julie Attwood, Member of Legislative Assembly of Queensland
- Jimmy Bartel, 2007 Brownlow Medallist and triple AFL Premiership Player in 2007, 2009 and 2011 with the Geelong Football Club. 2011 Norm Smith medallist
- Mark Blake, 2009 AFL Premiership player with the Geelong Football Club
- Campbell Brown, 2008 AFL Premiership player with Hawthorn Football Club and inaugural Gold Coast Football Club player: BCom (Sports Management)
- John Brumby, former Premier of Victoria: Dip Ed (Victoria College Rusden Campus)
- Jeremy Burge, founder of Emojipedia
- Mark Butler MP, Federal Member for Port Adelaide
- Tim Callan, AFL footballer with the Western Bulldogs: BCom
- Briony Cole, Gold medalist, 2006 Commonwealth Games, & Silver medalist, 2008 Summer Olympics
- Neil Comrie, former Chief Commissioner of Victoria Police: BA (Police Studies)
- Rodger Corser, Australian actor: BA (Hons) (Media Studies)
- Adinda Cresheilla, Indonesian G20 Ambassador, actress, fashion model, Puteri Indonesia Pariwisata 2022, Miss Supranational Indonesia 2022 and 3rd Runner-up of Miss Supranational 2022 beauty pageant: BA in Communication
- Trish Crossin, Senator for Northern Territory
- Peter Daniel, former footballer for Essendon Football Club, AFL: DipTeach
- Colonel Benito Antonio Templo De-León, Military Officer, Philippine Army: MA (Strategic Studies)
- Kate Eckhardt, slalom canoeist
- Oliver Feltham, contemporary philosopher and English translator of Alain Badiou's Being and Event (2006)
- Ben Graham, former Geelong Football Club star, now a punter for the Arizona Cardinals of the National Football League; first Australian to play in the Super Bowl: BCom
- Rachel Griffiths, actress (Victoria College Rusden Campus)
- Peter Gutwein, Premier of Tasmania: DipFP, GradCertBusAdmin
- Tom Harley, Dual Premiership Captain of Geelong Football Club in 2007 and 2009: BCom
- Geoff Hunt, World Champion squash player: Grad Dip (Nutrition)
- Mark Kelly (Australian general) Officer of the Australian Army: Grad.Dip. Defence Studies
- Arthur Vivian Lucas Jones, Bishop of the Anglican Church in Australia
- James Kilgore, as Charles William Pape, member of the Symbionese Liberation Army: PhD
- Michael Klinger, Australian cricketer
- Christopher Lynch, former Chief Financial Officer & Former Director of BHP, CEO of Transurban: BCom, MBA
- Mat McBriar, punter for the Dallas Cowboys of the National Football League
- Bridget McKenzie, Senator for Victoria, former Deputy Leader of the National Party of Australia
- Michael Malouf, former Chief Executive Officer, Carlton Football Club: MBA
- Carmen Marton, Australia's first ever world taekwondo champion
- Lindsay Maxsted, Chairman Westpac
- Denis Napthine, Premier of Victoria: MBA
- Livinia Nixon, Nine Network weather presenter: BCom, BA
- Henry Playfair, AFL footballer with the Sydney Swans: BCom
- Isabella Rositano, rapper and multi-sport athlete
- Jeff Rowley, surfer and celebrity speaker: MBA in leadership and communications.
- Peter Rowsthorn, actor (Victoria College's Rusden Campus)
- Mahmoud Saikal, Permanent representative of Afghanistan to the United Nations
- Leigh Sales, ABC journalist, anchor of 7.30 and book writer: Master of International Relations, Brisbane Writers Festival.
- Anurag Singh (director), Pollywood and Bollywood director
- Tommy Smith, international racing driver
- Matt Stevic, AFL umpire
- Jim Stynes OAM, businessman and Chairman of Melbourne Football Club: BEd
- Nathan Templeton (deceased), former 10 News First sports reporter and Melbourne correspondent on Sunrise
- Sid Vashist, Elected Mayor of the Barkly Region (2024-present)
- Stella Young, comedian, journalist and disability rights activist: BA
- Mandawuy Yunupingu, indigenous musician, community leader and Australian of the Year (1992): BA
- Mohammad Tawih, commander of the Royal Brunei Armed Forces: MA (Strategic Studies)

=== Academics and staff ===
- Anurag Singh, filmmaker
- Kevin Anderson, filmmaker
- Nick Birbilis, Materials engineer and authority in the field of corrosion science.
- Kate Buchanan ARC Future Fellow
- Michael Harvey Briggs, Professor of Human Biology and perpetrator of the Briggs affair
- John Jonas, Birks Professor of Metallurgy, McGill University: Visiting Professor.
- Fethi Mansouri, Distinguished Professor of migration and multicultural studies
- Caryl Nowson, Chair in Nutrition and Ageing
- Ross Oakley, former Australian Football League CEO: Adjunct Professor in the Faculty of Business and Law
- David Parkin, former coach of Carlton and Hawthorn Football Clubs: Lecturer in Exercise Science.
- Mark Weinberg, Chief Justice of Norfolk Island: Adjunct Professor, School of Law.
- Jim Kennan, former politician, Adjunct Professor of Law
- Svetha Venkatesh, Co-Director of the Artificial Applied Intelligence Initiative A2I2
- Jodi McAlister, Australian author and Senior Lecturer
- Holly High, anthropologist specialising in the ethnography of socialist Laos; Associate Professor at the Alfred Deakin Institute

==== Notable associates ====
- Frank Costa, Businessman and Philanthropist
- Lindsay Fox, Businessman and Philanthropist
- Brett Lee, Australian Cricketer and Deakin India Research Institute (DIRI) associate
- Denis Napthine, Victorian Premier and Politician
- Jeff Rowley, Big Wave Surfer, Adventure Waterman, and Celebrity Speaker

== Controversies ==
=== Reports of on-campus sexual assault and harassment ===
Between 2011 and 2016 the university reported there were 40 officially cases of sexual abuse and harassment on campus, resulting in 12 staff members being disciplined or sacked for sexual misconduct and no student expulsions or suspensions. The 2017 Australian Human Rights Commission report on sexual assault and harassment surveyed 649 Deakin students, and reported somewhat higher figures than this, finding that 2.8% of those surveyed claimed to have been assaulted on campus, and 21% had been sexually harassed.
