= Medical Rural Bonded Scholarship Scheme =

The Medical Rural Bonded Scholarship (MRBS) Scheme is an Australian government program designed to address the shortage of doctors in rural areas. As part of the scheme doctors are required to work for 20 hours per week in an area classified as RA2-5 for 9 months of the year over 4-5.5 years, once they have attained Fellowship and commenced their return of service period. Where these doctors work for the rest of the time is up to them, the location they choose to work in is also up to them. although they are restricted to working in areas classified as RA2-5 for their return of service.

There has been some criticism of this scheme in the past and most medical schools are not explicit in how these places are offered.

== MRBS offers ==
The general scheme of offers that you can receive for medical school includes: MRBS, Commonwealth Supported Place (CSP) and Bonded Medical Place (BMP). Most Australian medical schools ask you which offer type you would be willing to accept before they give out offers. They then rank the applicants and offer the MRBS places to the highest ranked applicants, who said they would be likely to accept the offer. These applicants can then choose to accept or reject the offer. If they accept (which generally occurs only after they have read and signed the contract) they enter the MRBS scheme. If the applicant rejects the MRBS offer at this point; the medical school will then offer the MRBS place to the next student on the list and this applicant will be offered a CSP place instead. Each medical school is required to offer a certain number of MRBS places and so will continue to approach students until these have all been accepted. At some universities the mrbs had to be accepted to gain a place in medical school. In most medical schools the BMP offers are given to the lower half of the ranked applicants.

Once the applicant has signed the contract, their place at the medical school is tied to the MRBS scheme, which means they can't decide to change their place type.

Note, this description of medical school offers has deliberately excluded full-fee and international places for simplicity.

=== HECS or no HECS? ===
Medical students who have either an MRBS place, CSP place or BMP place are all considered to have Commonwealth Supported Places and are all eligible for HECS-HELP loans. The only distinction that would significantly alter the cost of tuition at medical school is a full-fee paying place, which is not subsidised by the government. Full-fee paying places have been eliminated for domestic undergraduate students, but are still offered by some graduate-entry medical schools.

=== Contrast With Bonded Medical Places ===
The MRBS scheme is different from bonded medical places (BMP). Doctors who have graduated from a MRBS program must work 6 years in a rural area, starting no later than 12 months after they have completed their fellowship. Universities offer MRBS programs to students who already have a place in a medical course. These scholarships are therefore voluntary, and students are not pressured into accepting them with the promise of a medical placement.

Unlike the MRBS scheme, students who take bonded medical places must work in an 'area of need' and are not exclusively limited to working in rural areas. This can include a specialty in an urban area that is experiencing a shortage, or an outer suburb of a large metropolitan city. The defined 'areas of need' includes "inner regional" and typically includes the outer suburbs of most state capital cities.

== MRBS payments ==
The scholarship is paid in 10 equal monthly installments from March to December, for as many years as it takes to complete the medical course. No payments are made in January and February. The amount of the scholarship is indexed to ensure a real level of funding is maintained. For the academic year of 2015, the Australian government will pay $26,310.00 to students in a MRBS program.

The scholarship is exempt from Income Tax Assessment. However, it is considered to be income for Youth Allowance and other Centrelink payment purposes. As the scholarship is considered income for Centrelink Payment purposes, it is likely to make you ineligible to receive centrelink payments as well as the low-income healthcare card.

The time taken to complete the medical course assumes that the MRBS applicant will not fail any years. For example, if you accept an MRBS place and enter into a 5-year medical degree, then you will receive payments for 5 years, totaling somewhere near $125,000 (remember this is indexed each year). If you fail a year or for some reason take an additional year to complete a 5-year medical degree, you will not receive any scholarship payments for the additional year that it took for you to complete the course.

== Further support for MRBS Scheme Participants ==
As part of the scheme, participants also receive a range of additional support services from the Australian College of Rural and Remote Medicine (ACRRM). This support includes access to online discussions, forums, networking information and newsletters.

This support is also provided to participants of the John Flynn Placement Program and BMP students.

== Rural and Remote Classification ==
The classification system is based on the Australian Bureau of Statistics, Australian Standard Geographical Classification - Remoteness Areas (ASGC-RA). The current system groups locations into 'remoteness areas,' ranging from RA1 to RA5, to determine eligible areas for MRBS Scheme doctors completing their return of service obligations (RSO).

The ASGC-RA classification system is updated after each census, and so may change over time.

There is a misconception among some that you will be restricted to working in the middle of nowhere. However, although there are greater incentives to working in the middle of nowhere or an RA5-Very remote location. It is also possible to work in an RA2-Inner regional area that is often quite close to the major capital cities.

== Return of Service Obligations (RSO) ==
On attainment of a Fellowship the MRBS participant will be required to work as a specialist MRBS Scheme doctor in rural or remote areas of Australia for 6 continuous years, less any credits through Scaling.

=== Scaling ===
Scaling provides incentives to doctors who choose more remote areas for their RSO.

== Breach of contract ==
Breach of contract can occur under a number of conditions. These include failing to earn a degree, not practicing in a rural area, not becoming a Medical Practitioner within 10 years, and failing to obtain a fellowship within 16 years. The 10 and 16 year terms can be extended under certain circumstances (e.g., childbirth). If breach of contract occurs and none of the exceptions outlined in the contract apply, the repercussions include scholarship repayment and removal of medicare eligibility for up to 12 years. This limits the ability of the then-student, now-doctor to practice if they refuse to honour their contract.

== Constitutional issues ==
Members of the Australian parliament have raised concerns over the constitutionality of the scheme, as section 51(xxxiiiA) of the Australian Constitution prohibits legislation introducing any form of civil conscription for medical services. Speaking in the House of Representatives, Michelle O'Byrne said

On 10 September 1998, in a press release, the minister stated: The scholarships are probably unconstitutional due to the limitation in section 51 preventing civil conscription of doctors."

Countering the view that the scheme constitutes civil conscription is the argument that the scheme is entered into voluntarily. Government minister Ian Macfarlane said,

If the people who are considering taking these scholarships are not prepared to take the conditions, the answer is simple: don't sign them. This is not a compulsory scheme; this is a voluntary scheme."

As of 2010, a legal constitutional challenge has been filed in the Federal Court of Australia to the MRBS scheme in Edwards v Commonwealth, Secretary Department of Health And Ageing and Ors. It was later dismissed as the court found the applicant responsible "in fact and law for any misfortune of which he now complains". The matter went on appeal, and was settled before hearing in the federal court.

== Criticism ==
Some have criticised this program, stating that it preys on students who cannot support themselves during university. Many students may not realise the length of their obligations or fully understand the ramification of their decision to accept the scholarship. Often studying in a rural area limits the choice of speciality for new doctors, since some smaller specialities don't operate in rural areas. Speaking in parliament Mr. Dick Adams (Lyons) stated:

As I said, this bill is really about bashing people to achieve a goal. It sets out conscription on people which might be a contractual arrangement for 17 years and then you take away the Medicare ticket so they cannot get payment. Therefore, working as a doctor would be pretty difficult because you would probably work for nothing. I do not think that is the solution. ...[this is] a bill to bash people about the head with and make them stay somewhere where they probably do not want to be.

Others take the view it is a concerted effort to ban access to Medicare, thus hiding a blow out in Medicare costs and lack of services.

Government policy is to move population from areas of low work, generally rural to areas of high opportunity generally metropolitan centres.

Breach of the MRBS contract will trigger loss of a provider number and repayments. However these penalties are all clearly laid out in the contract and concessions are made if you need time to start a family or other exceptional circumstances occur.

However the contract and supporting material claims a students place is somehow "linked" or "funded" under the contract/scheme while at the same time each student is required to be eligible of HECS/CSP. There has been no change to HECS/CSP legislation to reflect this "link" assertion. Rather HECS/CSP legislation requires all students to be treated equally. The Department of Health and Ageing rather asks universities to terminate students, and pays amounts of money to universities on the basis they follow this request.

Some have criticised the scholarships, stating that they limit the ability of medical students to specialise in their chosen field.

== See also ==
- Medicare (Australia)
- Medicare card
- Medicare Australia
- Department of Health and Ageing
- ACRRM
