= Lindsay Maxsted =

Australian businessman

Lindsay Maxsted is an Australian businessman. He served as the chairman of the board of Westpac.

== Biography ==
Maxsted was born and raised in Geelong, Victoria.

From July 1984 to February 2008, he was a partner of KPMG Australia and, from January 2001 to December 2007, was its CEO.

He joined the board of directors of Westpac in 2008 and was chairman from 2011 to 2020. In November 2019, Maxsted announced that he was stepping down as chairman. That was in the context of heavy criticism of Maxted and the Westpac board by shareholders at the 2019 AGM, following the revelation by the financial watchdog AUSTRAC that the bank was facing charges after allegedly failing to investigate customers who made transactions possibly linked to child exploitation in the Philippines and South-East Asia.

According to the Australian Financial Review, some of those payments may have gone towards "live-streamed child abuse". The bank was also accused of breaching money laundering and counter-terrorism finance laws, and was accused of 23 million breaches in total.

Maxsted was chairman of the board of Transurban and a director of BHP. He was on the board of the Victorian Public Transport Corporation from December 1995 to 1997, and was its chairman until 2001. He served on the board of trustees of Baker Heart and Diabetes Institute.

In January 2020, Maxsted announced that he would not seek re-election as a director of BHP.

Business positions
Preceded by Ted Evans	Chairman of Westpac; 2011 – 2020	Succeeded by John McFarlane
