= Traynor (surname) =

English and Irish surname

Traynor is an English and Irish surname found throughout the Anglosphere.

The surname is most prevalent in the United States with 5,143 people bearing the surname, followed by England with 3,548 people, Ireland with 2,148 people, Scotland with 1,567 people, Australia with 1,251 people and Canada with 1,176 people. In Northern Ireland, 692 people bear the surname making it the 546th most common surname in the country.

== Origins in England ==
The surname may descend from the Old English word "trayne" which means to trap or snare and may have been the name for a hunter. The name was recorded in the 13th century on tax records in County Durham and in Yorkshire as well. Yorkshire was probably one of the first strongholds for the English family branch. Early examples of the surname in England is Robert Treiner found in County Durham's tax records in the year 1243, Ann Traner from marriage records found in the year 1604 and Robertus Trainer found on Yorkshire poll tax records in 1379.

Another possible origin of the surname may be that it may have been given to horse trainers in medieval England. The name remains common mostly in Northern England, particularly in Yorkshire and Durham. The surname is also quite common in North West England as well, with high populations in Cheshire, Lancashire, Merseyside and Greater Manchester.

== Origins in Ireland ==
The Irish surname may descend from "Threin Fhir" which means "strong man" in Irish Gaelic. It is mentioned in the Annals of the Four Masters compiled in the years 1632–1636 at the convent of Donegal, by the chief author, Michael O'Clery, a monk of the order of St. Francis as having descended from the Colla Dá Crich. In the Census of Ireland of 1659, from the poll money ordinance, the census describes the most common "Irish" names of County Monaghan and lists McTrenor among them citing 30 Irish McTrenor households.

Common throughout Ulster, the name is associated with Kelley and other Ui Maine ancestry. Legends from Clogher, County Tyrone, Northern Ireland associate the name with Aedh Mac Cairthinn, the first Bishop of Clogher who was called Saint Patrick's "strong man". Some male Traynors conducting Y-DNA genealogy tests have traced their Y-DNA to z2961+ m222- R-FGC6562+ as an adjunct branch of the Ui Maine haplogroup descending from Máine Mór.

Traynors in Ireland may also be of Anglo-Irish origins. The surname may have been brought over to Ireland by English settlers during the British rule in Ireland. The surname and its variations have been found on numerous parish records for various different Church of Ireland congregations throughout Ireland. Some Traynors were also have been members of the ruling upper class in Ireland during the Protestant Ascendancy. Some may also descend from settlers from the Plantation of Ulster, and may be descendants of Clan Armstrong and came to Ireland during the Plantation of Ulster or are perhaps descendants of Traynors from Northern England.

== Variations ==
Trainor, Trainer, Treanor, and Trayner are common variations.

== People ==
=== Traynor ===
- Arnold Traynor (1896–1976), Australian rugby league footballer
- Bradley Traynor (born 1975), known as Wanda Wisdom, podcasting drag queen
- Charles "Chuck" E. Traynor (1937–2002), American pornographer, ex-husband of Linda Lovelace, then Marilyn Chambers
- Chris Traynor (born 1973), American musician
- Des Traynor (1931–1994), Irish financier and accountant
- Donna Traynor, journalist, anchor on BBC Newsline
- Frank Traynor (1927–1985), Australian jazz musician
- Frank Traynor, Irish bantamweight boxer, winner of the bronze medal at the 1928 Summer Olympics
- Harold Traynor (1922–1983), Australian rules footballer
- John "Jack" Traynor, Royal Marine whose paralysed legs recovered at Lourdes
- Jay Traynor (1943–2014), American singer, member of the group Jay and the Americans
- James 'Jim' Sexton Traynor (born 1958), Scottish sports journalist of newspaper and radio
- Joanna Traynor, UK-born Nigerian-Irish author of Sister Josephine, Divine and Bitch Money
- John Traynor (criminal) (1948–2021), Dublin criminal who was a contact for murdered journalist Veronica Guerin
- Kyle Traynor (born 1986), Scottish rugby union player
- Matt Traynor (1987), American musician former metalcore member of Blessthefall
- Michael Traynor (actor) (1975), American actor
- Michael Traynor (politician) (1917–1970) was a leading member of Sinn Féin in the 1950s and 1960s.
- Oscar Traynor (1886–1963), Irish Fianna Fáil politician and revolutionary
- Paul Traynor (ice hockey) (born 1977), Canadian ice hockey player
- Philip A. Traynor (1874–1962), American dentist and politician
- Pie Traynor (1899–1972), American baseball third baseman
- Roger J. Traynor (1900–1983), served on the Supreme Court of California
- Susan Traynor (born 1944), also known as Noosha Fox, lead singer for the rock band Fox
- Robert Terence 'Bobby' Traynor (born 1983), English footballer for Kingstonian Football Club
- Stuart J. Traynor (1919–2008), American lawyer and politician
- Thomas Traynor (1881–1921), member of the Irish Republican Army hanged in Mountjoy Prison
- Tommy Traynor (1933–2006), Irish footballer
- William Bernard Traynor VC (1870–1956), English soldier awarded the Victoria Cross for gallantry in the face of the enemy during the Boer War
- W. J. H. Traynor (1845-?), notable Orange Order member and leader of anti-Catholic and anti-Irish nativist group in the United States and Canada called the American Protective Association

=== Trainor ===
- Bernard E. Trainor (1928–2018), American journalist and former marine officer
- Bobby Trainor (1934–2020 or 2021), Northern Irish former association footballer
- Charles St. Clair Trainor (1901–1978), Canadian lawyer, judge, and politician
- Conor Trainor (born 1989), Canadian rugby union player
- Danny Trainor (1944–1974), Northern Irish association footballer
- David Owen Trainor, American television director
- Jerry Trainor (born 1977), American actor, comedian, and musician
- Jordan Trainor (born 1996), New Zealand rugby union player
- Kendall Trainor (born 1967), American former football player
- Kevin Trainor, Irish actor
- Larry Trainor (1905–1975), American political activist
- Luke Trainor (1900–1973), Australian rules footballer for St Kilda
- Luke Trainor (born 2006), Australian rules footballer for Richmond
- Martyn Trainor (born 1944), South African former naval officer
- Mary Ellen Trainor (1952–2015), American actress
- Meghan Trainor (born 1993), American singer-songwriter and record producer
- Mike Trainor (born 1981), American stand-up comedian and writer
- Nicholas Trainor (born 1975), English former cricketer
- Owen Trainor (1894–1956), Canadian politician
- Patrick F. Trainor (1863–1902), American politician
- Rick Trainor (born 1948), American-British academic administrator and historian
- Wes Trainor (1921–1991), Canadian ice hockey player

=== Trainer ===
- Bob Trainer (1927–1982), Australian rules footballer
- David Trainer, American television director
- Douglas Trainer, former president of the National Union of Students of the United Kingdom
- Harry Trainer (1872–?), Welsh international footballer
- James Trainer (1863–1915), Welsh association football player of the Victorian era
- Joe Trainer (born 1968), American football coach and former player
- John Trainer (born 1943), former Australian politician.
- Marie Trainer (born 1940s), former mayor of Haldimand County, Ontario, Canada
- Melissa Trainer (born 1978), American astrobiologist
- Stephen Trainer, Scottish professional association footballer
- Ted Trainer, an Australian academic, author, and an advocate
- Todd Trainer, drummer for the band Shellac

=== Treanor ===
- Jack Treanor (1922–1993), Australian cricketer
