= Trainor =

Trainor is a surname of British origin, prevalent in English-speaking countries. It may refer to the following notable people:

- Bernard E. Trainor (1928–2018), American journalist and marine officer
- Bobby Trainor (1934 – c. 2020), Northern Irish association footballer
- Charles St. Clair Trainor (1901–1978), Canadian lawyer, judge, and politician
- Conor Trainor (born 1989), Canadian rugby union player
- Danny Trainor (1944–1974), Northern Irish association footballer
- David Owen Trainor, 20th- and 21st-century American former television director
- Gabrielle Trainor, Australian business director
- James E. Trainor III, contemporary American lawyer and government official
- Jerry Trainor (born 1977), American actor, comedian, and musician
- Jim Trainor, American experimental filmmaker and animator
- Jordan Trainor (born 1996), New Zealand rugby union player
- Kendall Trainor (born 1967), American former gridiron football player
- Kevin Trainor, contemporary Irish actor
- Kim Trainor, contemporary Canadian poet
- Larry Trainor (1905–1975), American political activist
- Luke Trainor (1900–1973), Australian rules footballer for St Kilda
- Luke Trainor (born 2006), Australian rules footballer for Richmond
- Martyn Trainor (born 1944), South African former naval officer
- Mary Ellen Trainor (1952–2015), American actress
- Meghan Trainor (born 1993), American singer
- Mike Trainor (born 1981), American stand-up comedian and writer
- Nicholas Trainor (born 1975), English former cricketer
- Owen Trainor (1894–1956), Canadian politician and Member of Parliament
- Patrick F. Trainor (1863–1902), American politician
- Peter Trainor (1915–1973), English association footballer
- Rick Trainor (born 1948), American-British academic administrator and historian
- Wes Trainor (1921–1991), Canadian ice hockey player

== See also ==
- Trainer
- Traynor (surname)
- Gabrielle Trainor Medal
