= Trainer (surname) =

Trainer is a surname. Notable people with the surname include:

- Bob Trainer (1927–1982), Australian rules footballer
- David Trainer, American television director
- David Trainer (1814–1890), American textile manufacturer
- Douglas Trainer, former president of the National Union of Students of the United Kingdom
- Harry Trainer (1872–?), Welsh international footballer
- Jack Trainer, a character in the 2022 action-adventure comedy film The Lost City
- James Trainer (1863–1915), Welsh association football player of the Victorian era
- Joe Trainer (born 1968), American football coach and former player
- John Trainer (born 1943), former Australian politician.
- Marie Trainer (born 1940s), former mayor of Haldimand County, Ontario, Canada
- Melissa Trainer (born 1978), American astrobiologist
- Stephen Trainer, Scottish professional association footballer
- Ted Trainer, an Australian academic, author, and an advocate
- Todd Trainer, drummer for the band Shellac

== Fictional characters ==
- Carolyn Trainer, a supervillain from Marvel Comics, also known as Lady Octopus
- Jack Trainer, a character played by Harrison Ford in the 1988 film Working Girl

== See also ==
- Trainer (disambiguation)
