= Luke Trainor =

Luke Trainor may refer to:

- Luke Trainor (footballer, born 1900) (1900–1973), Australian rules footballer for St Kilda
- Luke Trainor (footballer, born 2006), Australian rules footballer for Richmond

== See also ==
- Luke Traynor (born 1993), British long-distance runner
