= Peter Yorke =

Irish-American Catholic priest (1864–1925)

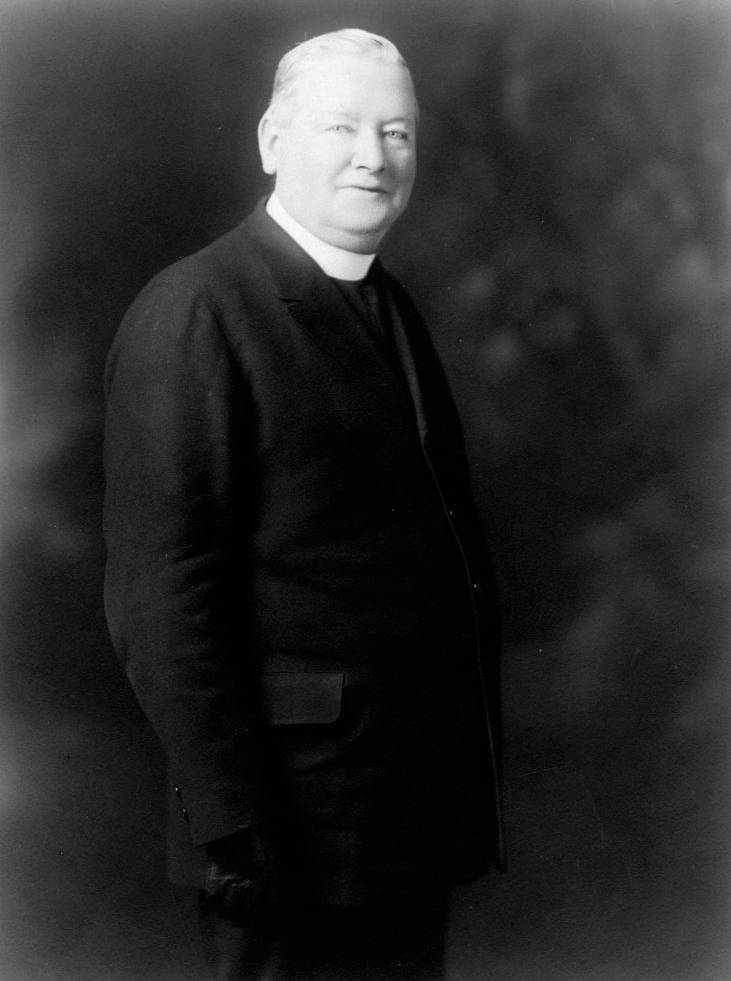
Peter C. Yorke

Peter Christopher Yorke (13 August 1864 – 4 April 1925) was an American Irish Catholic priest and an Irish Republican and Labor activist in San Francisco.

== Early life ==
Born on Galway's Long Walk on 13 August 1864, he was the youngest child of Gregory Yorke, a sea captain, and his wife, Bridget, née Kelly. Gregory Yorke died six months before Peter was born.

The Yorke family were originally from Holland, where the name was spelled Jorke. Peter Yorke's grandfather, Christopher Yorke, came to Galway in the early 19th century, building lighthouses and breakwaters in Galway, Aran and Westport.

== Priesthood ==
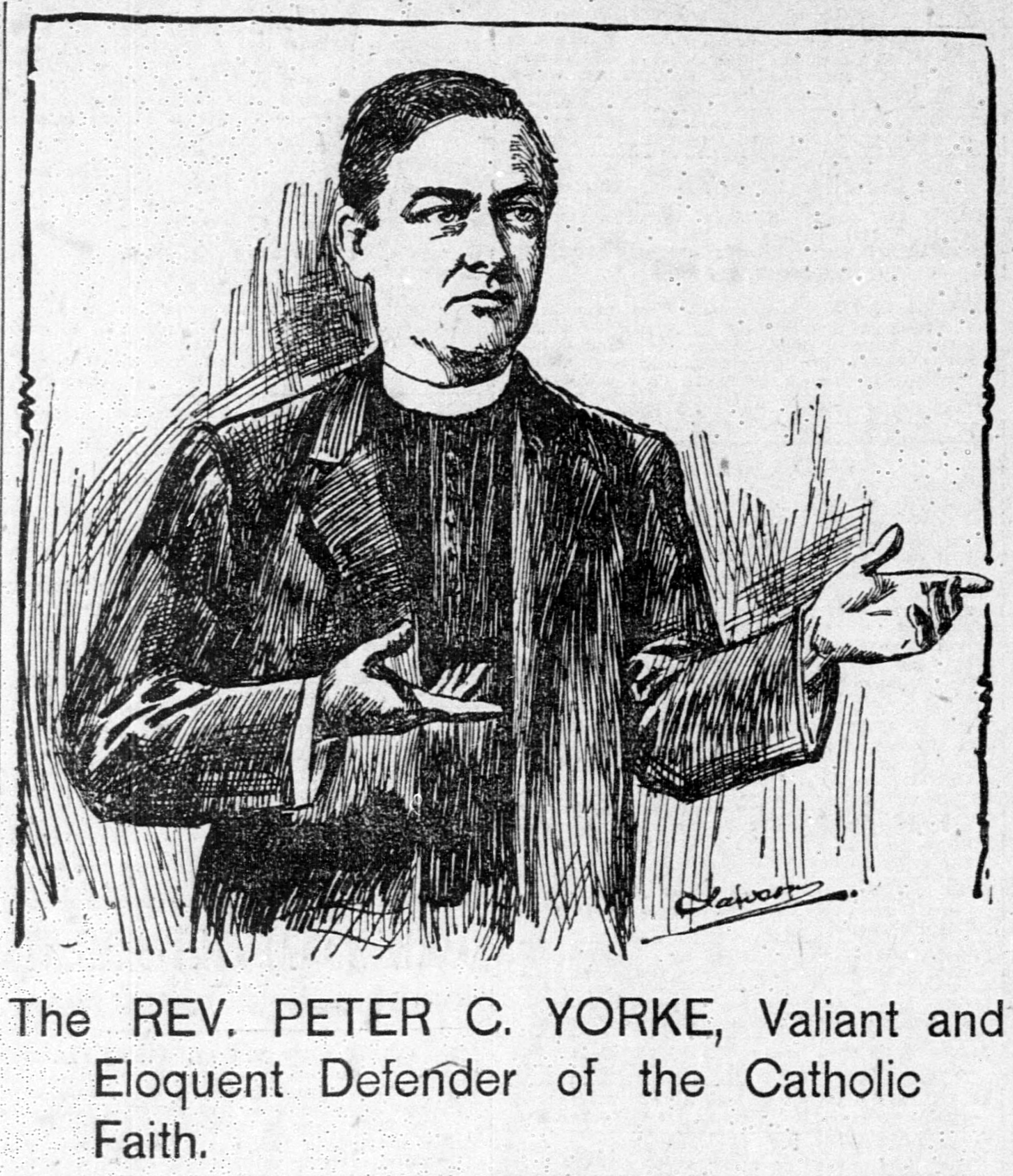
Illustration by a San Francisco Call artist, published November 1, 1898

In 1882, after initially schooling at Coláiste Iognáid Galway, Yorke then graduated from St. Jarlath's College in Tuam. He then went to St. Patrick's College, Maynooth, where he studied for four years before being adopted by the Archdiocese of San Francisco. He was ordained in 1887. He was pastor of St. Peter's in 1914.

In San Francisco, Yorke became the editor of The Monitor, the official newspaper of the archdiocese. During the 1898 California gubernatorial election, he denounced Democratic nominee James G. Maguire for a book he wrote ten years prior, Ireland and The Pope, in which he argued that the subjugation of Ireland by the British Empire had been orchestrated by certain medieval Popes. Yorke's attacks were so severe that Patrick William Riordan, the Archbishop of San Francisco, stated to the press: "Father Yorke is alone responsible for his utterances." In 1901, he supported the workers in a Teamsters strike. In 1902, he founded and edited a local newspaper called The Leader.

Yorke was the author of the best-selling textbook The Ghosts of Bigotry, originally republished in San Francisco 1913 from new plates, the originals having been destroyed in the earthquake and fire of 1906. It was the genesis work of the Catholic Truth Society, in response to an anti-Catholic literary campaign by the American Protestant Association, and a frank account of the "Black Myths" of English Protestant opposition to the Roman Catholic Church from the reign of Elizabeth I through to Catholic Emancipation and the Ecclesiastical Titles Act 1851 in the 19th century. Its concluding chapter sets the scene of Catholic resurgence in the USA. The publisher was the Text Book Publishing Company, 641 Stevenson Street.

== Legacy ==
Yorke is buried at Holy Cross Cemetery in Colma, California.

Every Palm Sunday the United Irish Societies of San Francisco hold a memorial celebration of Peter Yorke at Holy Cross Cemetery. Following the Palm Sunday Mass at All Saints Chapel, there is a short procession to his graveside. There poems, music and speeches celebrate his life.

A short street called Peter Yorke Way in San Francisco, which runs from the junction of Geary Boulevard and Gough Street to Post Street, is named after him. The headquarters of the archdiocese is located at 1 Peter Yorke Way.

== Sources ==
- Joseph S. Brusher, Consecrated Thunderbolt: Father Yorke of San Francisco (Hawthorne, New Jersey: Joseph F. Wagner, Inc., 1973)
- Sr. Mary Camilla Fitzmaurice, Historical Development of the Educational Thought of the Reverend Peter C. Yorke, 1893–1925 (1963)
- James P. Walsh, Ethnic Militancy: An Irish Catholic Prototype (San Francisco: R and E Research Associates, 1972)
- Priscilla F. Knuth, Nativism in California, 1886–1897.
- God give us men.
- The Virtual Museum of the City of San Francisco
