= AFL Commission =

Governing body of directors of the Australian Football League

Australian Football League Limited
- Sport: Australian rules football
- Jurisdiction: AFL, its subsidiaries and controlled entities.
- Founded: 1985
- Headquarters: AFL House, 140 Harbour Esplanade, Docklands, Victoria, Australia
- Chairman: Craig Drummond
- Replaced: AFL board of directors (1993)

Official website
- www.afl.com.au
- Other key staff: Andrew Dillon (CEO)
- (Australia)

The AFL Commission is the board of directors that governs the Australian Football League (AFL). Its chairman has been Craig Drummond since 4 March 2026.

In 1985, the AFL (then named Victorian Football League Limited) formed the commission as a body independent of its member clubs, to operate its competition. In 1993, the independent commissioners took over from the AFL's board of directors, who had been representatives of its then-15 member clubs.

In 1995, the AFL took over the operations of the Australian National Football Council which had published the Laws of Australian Football. The AFL's constitution self-proclaims it to be the "keeper of the code" responsible for the sport of Australian football. The AFL operates the All-Australian team, World (formerly All-international) team and Australian Football Hall of Fame.

The AFL operates its competitions and maintains a professional talent pathway for players through the AFL draft, AFL Draft Combine, AFL Academy and academies through its member clubs and affiliated bodies, Underage Men's and Underage Women's championships, the Australian Football (AFL) International Cup and through its worldwide affiliates, numerous regional representative tournaments.

The AFL operates the premier professional Australian Football competition in Australia and the State of Origin competition (1991-1999 and 2026-present). Since 1998, it has also overseen Australia's involvement in the International Rules Series.

== History ==
An independent governing body for the competition was first moved in December 1984 during the fallout of VFL president Allen Aylett's resignation following the South Melbourne Football Club's financially disastrous relocation to Sydney. The club, managed from Melbourne but playing in Sydney, had sustained substantial financial losses in Sydney and large loans had been written out by the league to keep them viable, which was also impacting the finances of the competition.

Under its first chief commissioner, Jack Hamilton, the VFL began a restructuring toward a franchise model, whereby member clubs operate licenses owned by the league. The model helped make private ownership of the Swans possible in 1985, as well as the sale of new licenses, resulting in the entry of the Brisbane Bears and West Coast Eagles in 1987. Under the new model, many Melbourne clubs struggling for financial viability such as St Kilda, Fitzroy and North Melbourne could be kept afloat by a combination of private ownership and league subsidies from the sale of new clubs and television rights. The restructuring paved the way for the VFL's expansion into a national competition.

Despite continuing financial troubles at many clubs, including the Swans and Footscray, the AFL was able to turn the competition's finances around by 1989, aided by increased television rights and the sale of $4 million licenses to interstate expansion clubs.

In 2014, all AFL players were fully-paid professionals for the first time in the competition's history.

== Governance of AFL ==
The AFL is governed by its board of directors, called the AFL Commission.

In 1995, the AFL took over the operations of the Australian National Football Council, which ceased operations after 89 years of existence. In 2002, it took over the operations of the International Australian Football Council. In 2010, it took over the operations of Women's Football Australia, which ceased operations in 2015.

The AFL took over the operations of the New South Wales Australian Football League Limited, and the AFL subsidiary, AFL NSW/ACT now operates in Australia's most populous eastern state and the ACT. The AFL promotes and brands the sport under its own name rather than of the formal name of Australian Football.

The ten commissioners are elected by the 18 AFL clubs, with each of the 18 clubs entitled to make nominations, but other Australian Football leagues, associations and clubs do not have any control or representation.

The AFL approves new club franchise licenses to expand its competition. Since 1987, it has been instrumental in the merger that created the Brisbane Lions, while the Sydney Swans were fully owned by the AFL, which retains a controlling interest and reversion rights in the event the Sydney Swans do not repay debts to the AFL. The AFL also fully owns the Greater Western Sydney Giants.

Other clubs to have an AFL appointed board include the Sydney Swans, the Gold Coast Suns, Adelaide Football Club and Port Adelaide Football Club. The AFL operates a Competitive Balance Fund, which redistributes profits to the clubs most in need to help ensure that all of its member clubs are financially sustainable in the long-term.

The AFL is financially dependent on the success of its competitions with the majority of its funding coming from the AFL competition broadcasting rights. The 2025-2031 rights will earn $4.5 billion, the most lucrative in Australian sporting history. The majority is invested in ensuring that the AFL continues to sustain its future revenues, such as protecting the primacy of its competition, as well as growing its broadcast audience, talent pathways and professionalism to attract the best available players (from junior development programs and high-performance athletes from around the world).

The AFL operates the Australian Football Hall of Fame, the AFL men's underage championships and AFL Women's underage championships. It is also responsible for senior State of Origin competition, which will return in 2026 after a 27-year hiatus.

== AFL role in national and international game development ==
The AFL is administered by its commission of company directors, which sets policy and has directed the VFL/AFL (known then as the VFL) as the game's most professional league since December 1985.

In 1993, the independent commissioners took over as the directors of the AFL from its Board of Directors, which had been appointed as delegates of its then 15 member clubs. The Board of Directors voted itself out of existence, and the AFL's then 15 member clubs also voted to abolish the old system of club appointment of directors and to adopt a new Memorandum and Articles of Association for the AFL.

This was a significant change of power: between 1985 and 1993, the VFL/AFL had required explicit approval by a 75% vote of its member teams for major items such as further expansion, mergers, relocations, and major capital works.

In 1995, the AFL took over the operations of the ANFC (see Principle 2 below).

The AFL also created an international policy in 2005 and took over the operations of the International Australian Football Council.

Amateur and semi-professional Australian Football competitions across Australia are mostly self-sufficient from the AFL. These competitions, their clubs and teams often buy equipment and apparel that is AFL branded which provides revenue to the AFL. Some junior competitions pay to use the AFL proprietary Auskick program and junior clubs pay the AFL for give-away packs at AFL run promotions in their localities.

The AFL has established a pathway that features junior Academies and scholarships from representational level up to its member clubs. The highest level is the AFL Academy, with academies for each state being managed by their respective AFL clubs and affiliated governing bodies.

Between 2010 and 2021, the AFL spent between $6–38 million per annum (under 5% of total revenue) on game development grants globally (excluding a one-off COVID-19 pandemic community football recovery package). With a new TV rights deal in 2022 and to help the game at the grassroots continue its recovery following the COVID-19 pandemic, the AFL increased its community grants to $67 million.

== Player recognition ==
- Australian Football Hall of Fame
- All-Australian Team

== Election of commission by member clubs ==
The ten commissioners are nominated and elected by vote of the 18 AFL member clubs. A two-thirds majority of member clubs have the power to veto over commission decisions. The commission elects its chairman and employs a chief executive officer to oversees the management and operations of the AFL.

=== Current commissioners and CEO ===
The current membership of the commission is:

| Name | Current role | Appointed |
|---|---|---|
| Craig Drummond | Chairman | 2026 |
| Andrew Dillon | Chief executive officer | 2023 |
| Paul Bassat | Commissioner | 2011 |
| Kim Williams | Commissioner | 2014 |
| Simone Wilkie | Commissioner | 2015 |
| Jason Ball | Commissioner | 2015 |
| Andrew Newbold | Commissioner | 2016 |
| Gabrielle Trainor | Commissioner | 2016 |
| Robin Bishop | Commissioner | 2017 |
| Helen Milroy | Commissioner | 2018 |

=== Current and former commissioners and CEOs ===
Bold text indicates currently serving members.

==== Chief executive officers ====
- **Andrew Dillon** (2023–present)
- Gillon McLachlan (2014–2023)
- Andrew Demetriou (2003–2014)
- Wayne Jackson (1996–2003)
- Ross Oakley (1994–1996)

==== Chairmen ====
- **Craig Drummond** (2026–present)
- Richard Goyder (2017–2026)
- Mike Fitzpatrick (2007–2017)
- Ron Evans (1997–2007)
- John Kennedy, Sr. (1993–1997)
- Ross Oakley (1986–1993)

==== Executive Commissioners ====
- Alan Schwab (1986–1993)

==== Commissioners ====
- Professor **Helen Milroy** (2018–present)
- **Robin Bishop** (2017–present)
- **Gabrielle Trainor** (2016—present)
- **Andrew Newbold** (2016–present)
- **Simone Wilkie** (2015–present)
- **Jason Ball** (2015–present)
- **Kim Williams** (2014–present)
- **Paul Bassat** (2011–present)
- **Richard Goyder** (2011–present)
- Linda Dessau (2009–2015)
- Christopher Lynch (2009–2014)
- Sam Mostyn (2005–2016)
- Andrew Demetriou (2004–2016)
- Mike Fitzpatrick (2003–2017)
- Bob Hammond (2001–2011)
- Graeme John (2001–2011)
- Chris Langford (1999–2016)
- Bill Kelty (1998–2015)
- David Shaw (1997–1998)
- Craig Kimberley (1997–1998)
- Wayne Jackson (1995–2003)
- Colin Carter (1993–2007)
- Terry O’Connor (1993–2000)
- John Kennedy, Sr. (1993–1997)
- John Winneke (1993–1994)
- Michael Carlile (1991–1992)
- Albert Mantello (1988–1992)
- Ross Oakley (1986–1996)
- Graeme Samuel (1985–2002)
- Peter Scanlon (1985–1992)
- Peter Nixon (1985–1990)
- Richard Seddon (1985–1987)
- Jack Hamilton (1984-1986)

==== Life members ====
- Colin Carter (2009)
- Graeme Samuel (1995)

== Intervention ==
While the commission is responsible for directing AFL policy, it has, on occasions, become directly involved in on and off-field matters relating to AFL competitions, players, coaches and managers. Sometimes these interventions have been in controversial circumstances.

=== On the field ===
- The "Line in the Sand" match in 2004 in which 18 players were reported on 26 charges arising from a third-quarter brawl. Four Hawthorn players were suspended for a total of 15 matches while Essendon's Justin Murphy was suspended for one match.
- Criticism from AFL CEO Andrew Demetriou and Network 10 commentators Stephen Quartermain, Tim Lane and Robert Walls of Paul Roos' style of coaching after the Sydney Swans' 43-point loss to St Kilda in round 10 of the 2005 season.
- 2006 Aurora Stadium Siren Controversy – investigated the disputed finish to the St. Kilda vs. Fremantle match played at Aurora Stadium on 30 April 2006. The result was that the AFL commission overturned the drawn result to award Fremantle four premiership points instead of two.
- The six-match suspension handed to Port Adelaide defender Tom Jonas for intentionally striking West Coast's Andrew Gaff in round 9 of the 2016 AFL season.
- The five-match suspension handed to Greater Western Sydney forward Jeremy Cameron for his crude hit on Brisbane Lions fullback Harris Andrews in round 14 of the 2018 AFL season. Cameron became the first player in league history to be sent straight to the tribunal more than once in his career.
- The two-match suspension handed to Hawthorn captain Ben Stratton, one each for repeatedly pinching Essendon's Orazio Fantasia and for stomping Shaun McKernan, in round 13 of the 2019 AFL season.
- The initial three-match suspension handed to Greater Western Sydney forward Toby Greene for intentionally making contact with umpire Matt Stevic at three-quarter-time in the Giants' one-point victory over Sydney in the second elimination final. A successful appeal from the AFL saw the suspension increased to six matches.
- The three-match suspension handed to Port Adelaide player Jeremy Finlayson after he admitted to making a homophobic slur towards an Essendon player in round four of the 2024 AFL season.
- The five-match suspension handed to Port Adelaide player Dan Houston for his crude bump on Adelaide's Izak Rankine in round 23 of the 2024 AFL season.

=== Off the field ===
The commission has become involved when players or a club bring the game into disrepute, including:

- Salary cap breaches by the Carlton Football Club in 2002 which hampered the club from rebuilding its playing list in the following years.
- 2007 investigation into the West Coast Eagles party in Las Vegas, Nevada, United States, after the 2006 AFL Grand Final. During the Las Vegas parties, Ben Cousins rehabilitation from drug addiction, Daniel Kerr's criminal charges and the hospitalisation of Chad Fletcher after choking on his own vomit were part of the issues following the overseas trip.
- The trading out of Brendan Fevola from the Carlton Football Club over his behaviour at the 2009 Brownlow Medal function.
- The sacking of Richmond player Daniel Connors over repeated off-field infringements during his playing career with the club, including a drunken rampage in Sydney in 2010 and "failing to meet club expectations on a number of occasions" in 2012.
- Claims during 2012 that Melbourne deliberately lost matches towards the end of the 2009 season so it could attain a priority draft pick at that year's end-of-season draft.
- 2012 overhaul of the Port Adelaide Football Club including the sacking of senior coach Matthew Primus and president Brett Duncanson
- 2013 investigation into reports of the use of illegal supplements by the Essendon Football Club
- 2013 overhaul of the Melbourne Football Club including the sacking of senior coach Mark Neeld
- The club-imposed five-match suspension handed to Greater Western Sydney player Toby Greene for intentionally assaulting a security guard at a Melbourne nightclub during the club's bye week in 2014, in between which the Giants suffered two defeats in excess of more than 100 points.
- The six-month suspension handed to Greater Western Sydney player Lachie Whitfield for attempting to evade a random drug test during the 2016–17 off-season, which took in missing the first eight matches of the 2017 AFL season. Ex-GWS employees Graeme Allan and Craig Lambert were both suspended for twelve months each, while the club was also stripped of its first-round draft pick in the 2017 AFL draft.
- The three-match suspension handed to Richmond player Nathan Broad for leaking a photo of a topless woman wearing his premiership medallion without her consent in the weeks following the club's 2017 AFL Grand Final victory.
- The season-ending suspension handed to Sydney Swans player Elijah Taylor for a major breach of Western Australia's strict quarantine rules while the club was in the state during the 2020 season and his subsequent dismissal from the club at the end of the season for assaulting his ex-partner.
- 2021 overhaul of the Carlton Football Club including the sacking of senior coach David Teague and chief executive officer Cain Liddle
- a reprimand handed to Greater Western Sydney player Tom Green in the wake of comments he made criticizing Match Review Officer Michael Christian and the AFL Tribunal on a since-deleted club podcast.
- the investigation into the Greater Western Sydney Giants' 2024 post-season function in which several players behaved inappropriately in a private setting, including the use of distasteful costumes and inappropriate skits. Captain Toby Greene was fined $5,000 for his lack of leadership, Josh Fahey was suspended for four matches, and five other players were suspended for two matches each for their roles in the scandal.
- the conviction of Richmond player Noah Balta for an assault on a man outside a pub in Mulwala, New South Wales, in December last year which saw him handed a three-month curfew during which he must remain at his home address between 10:00 pm and 6:00 am, thus excluding him from playing in Richmond's night matches during that period.

=== Expansion ===
The AFL undertakes assessments of expansion clubs and awarding new licences including:

- Gold Coast Suns
- Greater Western Sydney Giants
- Tasmania Devils (to commence play in 2028)

The AFL owns a stake in the Gold Coast and Greater Western Sydney clubs.

=== Member club viability ===
The AFL manages a special fund called the Competitive Balance Fund (CBF) since 2004 as a grant of up to $5 million per club to ensure that member clubs remain financially viable.

The system was later changed to the Annual Special Distribution (ASD) of $6.3 million shared among all clubs, as well as allowing for grants and special concessions, such as payments, to ensure that the AFL member clubs remain viable in the short term. In 2006, the AFL approved a $2.1 million special financial assistance package for Carlton.

In response to clubs increasingly relying on and applying for special funding, in 2008, the AFL recommended removing the fund altogether, but after considerable club protests led by three struggling clubs, the Western Bulldogs, Melbourne and North Melbourne, CEO Andrew Demetriou announced that the ASD would remain.

In early 2009, it increased Melbourne's assistance from $250,000 to $1 million and made a $1 million grant to Port Adelaide.

== See also ==
- International Federation of American Football
- Federation of International Touch
