= Traynor =

Traynor may refer to:

== People ==
- Traynor (surname)
- Traynor Ora Halftown (1917–2003), Native American entertainer

== Fictional characters ==
- Carol Traynor, in the TV series Maude
- John Traynor, in the 2003 film Veronica Guerin
- Joyner William "Willie" Traynor, in John Grisham's The Last Juror
- Steve "Jetlad" Traynor, in the graphic novel Top 10: The Forty-Niners
- Traynor, in the British children's television series Timeslip

== Other uses ==
- Traynor Amplifiers, a brand of amplifiers designed by Yorkville Sound
- Traynor, Saskatchewan, Canada, a locality in Rural Municipality of Rosemount No. 378

== See also ==
- Trainer (disambiguation)
