= Trainer =

Trainer may refer to:

== Entertainment ==
- Trainer (album), an album released by Plaid in 2000
- Trainer (TV series), a British TV series
- The Trainer, a 2009 British play written by David Wilson and Anne Aylor
- Trainer!, a 2013 German documentary by Aljoscha Pause
- Trainer (film), transliteration of Coach, a 2018 Russian film by Danila Kozlovsky

== Equipment and technology ==
- Trainer (bicycling), a device that attaches to a bicycle and makes it stationary for indoor training
- Trainer (aircraft), an aircraft used for training pilots
- Sneakers, an athletic shoe, called trainers in British and Hong Kong English
- Trainer (games), software for computer and video games that adds in extra options, usually to make the game easier
- Arc Trainer, a stationary, non-impact exercise machine
- Goair Trainer, an Australian monoplane
- Holdfast Trainer, a South Australian sailing dinghy
- Marendaz Trainer, a two-seat low-wing training aircraft
- Radlock Trainer, a single seat primary glider

== Places ==
- Trainer, Pennsylvania, United States
- Trainer, West Virginia, United States
- Trainer Glacier, a glacier in Victoria Land, Antarctica
- Trainer Hills, a mountain range in California, United States
- Treene (disambiguation), a river and municipality in Schleswig-Holstein in Germany

== Professions ==
- Animal training, a person who trains animals for obedience, tricks, and work
- Athletic trainer, a certified and licensed health care professional who practices in the field of sports medicine
- Horse trainer, a person responsible for preparing a horse for horse racing
- Personal trainer, a person who guides another person in developing physical fitness
- Trainer (business), or facilitator, a person who educates employees of companies on specific topics of workplace importance

== Other uses ==
- Trainer card, a Pokémon trading card
- Trainer (surname)

== See also ==
- Trainor (disambiguation)
- Traynor (disambiguation)
- Coach (disambiguation)
