= Rebecca Beeson =

Australian rules footballer

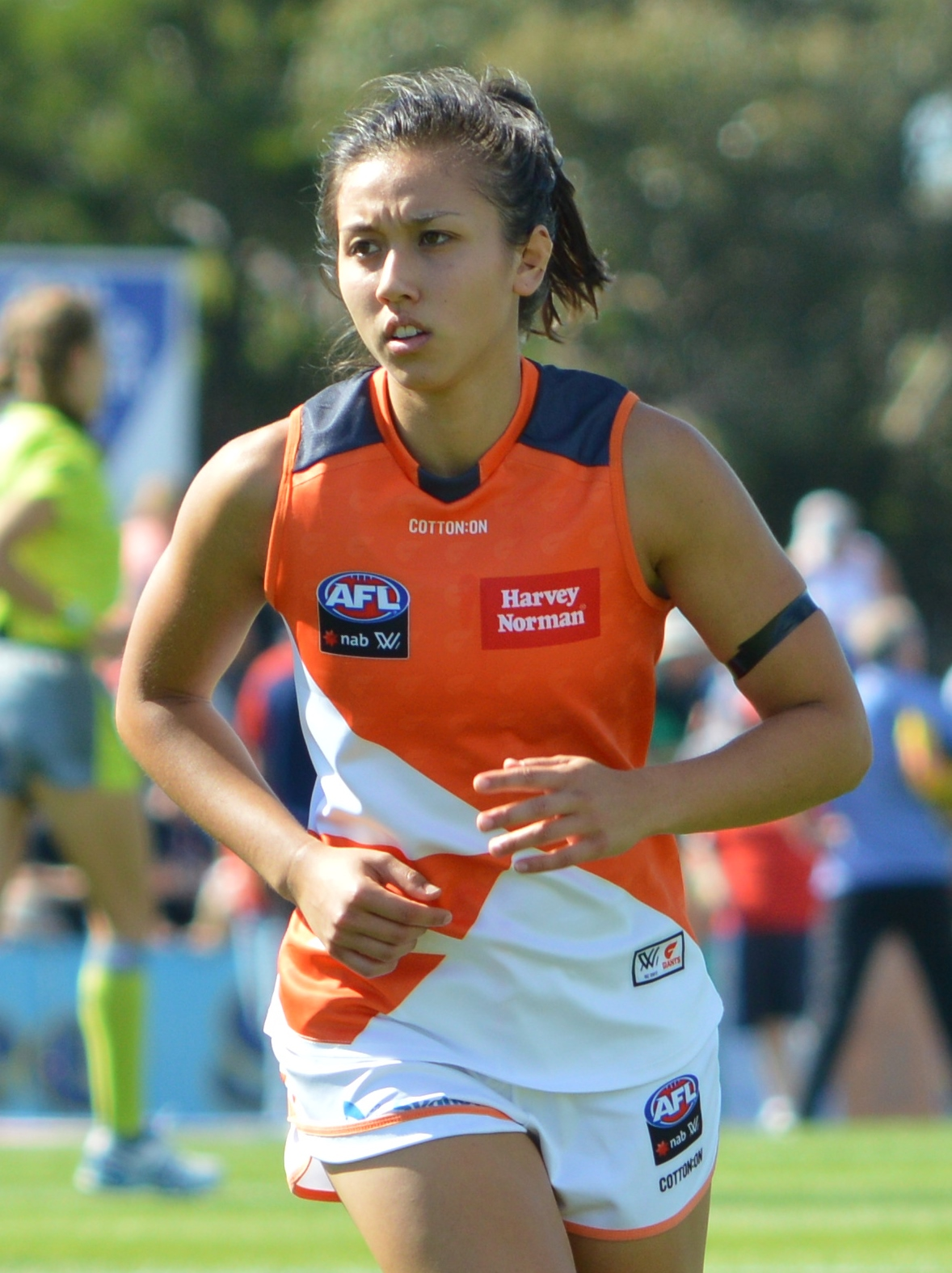
- Beeson playing for Greater Western Sydney in February 2018

Personal information
- Born: 20 February 1997 (age 29); Sydney
- Original team: University NSW (SWAFL)
- Draft: No. 32, 2016 AFL Women's draft
- Debut: Round 1, 2017, Greater Western Sydney vs. Adelaide, at Thebarton Oval
- Height: 165 cm (5 ft 5 in)
- Position: Midfielder

Club information
- Current club: Greater Western Sydney
- Number: 6

Playing career^{1}
Years	Club	Games (Goals)
2017–	Greater Western Sydney	61 (12)
- ^{1} Playing statistics correct to the end of the 2024 season.

Career highlights
- AFL Women's Rising Star nominee: 2018; Gabrielle Trainor Medal: 2019, 2024

Rebecca Beeson (born 20 February 1997) is an Australian rules footballer playing for the Greater Western Sydney Giants in the AFL Women's competition.

== Early life ==
Beeson grew up on the Central Coast of New South Wales where she played soccer, softball and rugby as a junior.

Her family temporarily relocated to Perth, Western Australia when she was 12 years of age. Whilst living in Perth, Beeson joined a local Youth Girls competition for Australian rules football and developed a passion for the sport.

Beeson returned to Sydney during high school and resumed playing with the Macquarie University AFC. Whilst studying at the University of New South Wales, she switched to the UNSW-Eastern Suburbs Bulldogs.

Beeson was drafted by the Greater Western Sydney Giants with their fourth selection and thirty-second overall in the 2016 AFL Women's draft.

Beeson is of Taiwanese descent from her maternal side.

== AFLW ==
Beeson made her debut in the thirty-six point loss to Adelaide at Thebarton Oval in the opening round of the 2017 season. She played every match in her debut season to finish with seven games.

Beeson received a nomination for the 2018 AFL Women's Rising Star award for her performance in round 1 of the 2018 season.

After a standout season in 2019, Beeson was awarded the Gabrielle Trainor Medal as the best and fairest player at the Greater Western Sydney Giants. She was also recognised for her breakout season by being named in the initial squad for the AFL Women's All-Australian team.

Beeson missed the entire 2022 season (season 7) due to ongoing concussion effects but returned to the field in round one of the 2023 season. She brought up her 50 game milestone in the final round of the season against Port Adelaide.

Beeson enjoyed a stellar 2024 campaign which culminated in being awarded her second Gabrielle Trainor Medal.

== Statistics ==
Statistics are correct to the end of round 10, 2024.

Legend
G	Goals	K	Kicks	D	Disposals	T	Tackles
B	Behinds	H	Handballs	M	Marks

Season	Team	No.	Games	Totals							Averages (per game)							Votes
Season	Team	No.	Games	G	B	K	H	D	M	T	G	B	K	H	D	M	T	Votes
2017	Greater Western Sydney	6	7	3	2	38	35	73	10	15	0.4	0.3	5.4	5.0	10.4	1.4	2.1	0
2018	Greater Western Sydney	6	7	2	1	52	25	77	13	16	0.4	0.1	7.4	3.6	11.0	1.9	2.3	0
2019	Greater Western Sydney	6	7	0	3	60	54	114	14	22	0.0	0.4	8.6	7.7	16.3	2.0	3.1	5
2020	Greater Western Sydney	6	7	0	1	57	55	112	14	19	0.0	0.1	8.1	7.9	16.0	2.0	2.7	1
2021	Greater Western Sydney	6	9	1	1	46	49	95	10	20	0.3	0.3	11.5	12.3	23.8	2.5	5.0	
2022 (S6)	Greater Western Sydney	6	4	1	1	33	34	67	11	8	0.3	0.3	8.3	8.3	16.8	2.8	2	
2022 (S7)	Greater Western Sydney	6	0	0	0	0	0	0	0	0	0	0	0	0	0	0	0	0
2023	Greater Western Sydney	6	9	3	4	82	78	160	28	35	0.3	0.4	9.1	8.7	17.8	3.1	3.9	
2024	Greater Western Sydney	6	10	1	2	126	96	222	26	65	0.1	0.2	12.6	9.6	22.2	2.6	6.5	
			60	11	15	546	474	1020	136	221	0.2	0.3	9.1	7.9	17	2.3	3.7	6
