= Ross Oakley =

Australian rules footballer, born 1942

Personal information
- Full name: Ross Graham Oakley
- Born: 30 September 1942 (age 84); Australia
- Original team: Wesley College
- Height: 178 cm (5 ft 10 in)
- Weight: 81 kg (179 lb)

Playing career^{1}
Years	Club	Games (Goals)
1962–1966	St Kilda	62 (38)
- ^{1} Playing statistics correct to the end of 1966.

Ross Graham Oakley OAM (born 30 September 1942) is an Australian businessman and former Australian rules footballer with St Kilda in the Victorian Football League (VFL). He is CEO of the Victorian Rugby Union and was appointed CEO of the now defunct Melbourne Rebels rugby union franchise in September 2010.

== Playing career ==
Oakley attended Wesley College, Melbourne, and began his senior VFL footballing career with the St Kilda Football Club in 1962. He went on to score 38 goals in 62 games. His career was marred by unfortunate knee injuries; the first came in 1965 in St Kilda's semi-final victory, which meant Oakley missed the Grand Final. He suffered déjà vu in 1966, missing not only the Grand Final but St Kilda's first VFL premiership. Following a further injury before the start of the 1967 season, Oakley retired at the age of 24.

== Executive career ==
Oakley was appointed chairman and CEO of the then troubled Victorian Football League in 1986, taking over the role from Jack Hamilton, remaining as chairman until the role was separated in 1993, and remaining as CEO until the end of the 1996 season.

He oversaw the transformation of the VFL into the Australian Football League, and under Oakley's guidance, five new clubs from outside Victoria: Brisbane and the West Coast Eagles (1986), Adelaide (1990), Fremantle (1994), and Port Adelaide (1996) all joined the more professional, national competition.

In 1993, he oversaw the transfer of administrative control of the league from the clubs (via the AFL Board of Directors) to the AFL Commission, and the formal transfer of control of the code from the ANFC to the AFL Commission.

During his time with the VFL/AFL, he was deeply involved in mergers; his administration believed that eleven Victorian clubs, many of which were in a poor financial state, was unsustainable in a national competition. Victorian clubs were offered incentive packages of up to $6 million to merge during his tenure, but the only merger completed during his tenure was between Fitzroy and Brisbane Bears, with proposed mergers between Fitzroy and Footscray in 1989 and Melbourne and Hawthorn in 1996 coming very close to fruition.

However, these merger attempts caused great off-field discord among clubs and fans, and the strategy was abandoned after Oakley was succeeded by Wayne Jackson as CEO at the end of 1996.

In 2009, Oakley was inducted into the Australian Football Hall of Fame as an administrator. His previous career included management of insurance companies (e.g. AAMI), and he was chief executive of Royal Insurance.

Oakley's appointment as Melbourne Rebels' CEO was announced 9 September 2010, when the Rebels also said the franchise was to join forces with the Victorian Rugby Union to build rugby union in Victoria, at both professional and amateur levels. Oakley became CEO to fill the gap left by the resignation of Rebels' founding CEO Brian Waldron who resigned in early 2010 in the wake of the Melbourne Storm salary cap scandal.

Oakley holds a Master of Business Administration (MBA) from the Melbourne Business School. He is a former Adjunct Professor at Deakin University's Faculty Business and Law, where he also lectured.

== Board positions ==
Ross Oakley is a former Chairman of Royal Australian Holdings Ltd, Royal Life Insurance Australia Ltd, and the State Training Board of Victoria. He is listed as Chairman of the Get Going Sport Foundation, and he has served as director on the boards of AAMI Ltd and Tisdall Wines. Between 1997 and 2001 Oakley was a director of Harris Scarfe.
