= W. J. H. Traynor =

W.J.H. Traynor, Supreme President of the American Protective Association from 1893 to 1903.

Newspaper portrait of Supreme President Traynor from 1895.

William James Henry Traynor (born July 4, 1845 in Brantford, Ontario) was a Canadian-American anti-Catholic political activist. He is best known for heading the American Protective Association, a nationalist and anti-Catholic organization.

== Biography ==
He moved to Detroit, where he was editor of the anti-Catholic weekly, The Patriotic American, and was elected Supreme Grand Master of the Loyal Orange Institution of the United States under the Orange Order.

Traynor was elected Supreme President of the American Protective Association in 1893, and he continued to head that organization during its peak of influence in the middle 1890s. He continued to lead that organization until APA founder Henry F. Bowers was returned as the group's leader in 1903.

== Works ==
- "The Aims and Methods of the 'APA,'" North American Review, vol. 159, whole no. 452 (July 1894), pp. 67-76.
- "The Menace of Romanism," North American Review, vol. 161, whole no. 465 (Aug. 1895), pp. 129-140.
- "Policy and Power of the APA," North American Review, vol. 162, whole no. 475 (June 1896), pp. 658-666.
- The Devil's Catechism: Being a List of Questions and Answers Compiled from Standard Roman Catholic Authorities. New York: P. Eckler, 1920.
