= Thurgoona Football Club =

Names
- Full name: Thurgoona Football Netball Club
- Nickname(s): Bulldogs

Club details
- Founded: 1988; 37 years ago
- Colours
- Competition: Tallangatta & District
- Ground(s): Thurgoona Football Ground

Uniforms
Home

The Thurgoona Football Netball Club, nicknamed the Bulldogs, is an Australian rules football and netball club playing in the Tallangatta & District Football League. The club is based in Thurgoona, New South Wales

Thurgoona Football Club won their first premiership in the Albury District Football Association in 1900 defeating Black Range at Jindera Park, to win the Swain Trophy.

== History ==
The first recorded match involving Thurgoona FC was in 1883 when they played Wodonga FC, at Wodonga in July, 1883.

South Albury (established in 1945) who had been playing in the Tallangatta & District Football League since 1977 were struggling on and off the field tried to relocate and start afresh as Thurgoona but the move didn't eventuate forcing the club to fold in 1981.

- Thurgoona F.C.
  - 1988- NOW: Tallangatta & District Football League

=== Games Played ===
- Won: 63:
- Lost 295:
- Drew 0:

=== Football Premierships ===
Seniors

- Albury District Football Association
  - 1: - 1900
- Tallangatta & District Football League
  - 2: – 2016, 2017

=== Finals ===
Thurgoona have made the finals on five occasions

- 1993
  - Elimination Final: Lost to Holbrook.
- 1994
  - Elimination Final: Lost to Mitta United.
- 2007
  - Elimination Final: Won against Chiltern.
  - First Semi Final: Lost to Barnawatha.
- 2009
  - Elimination Final: Lost to Yackandandah.
- 2010
  - Qualifying Final: Won against Yackandandah.
  - 2nd Semi Final: Lost to Beechworth.
  - Preliminary Final: Lost to Yackandandah.

=== Wooden Spoons ===
- Tallangatta & District Football League
  - 9: 1989, 1990, 1992, 1997, 1998, 2000, 2002, 2003, 2005.
