= Harry Armstrong (Australian footballer) =

Australian footballer

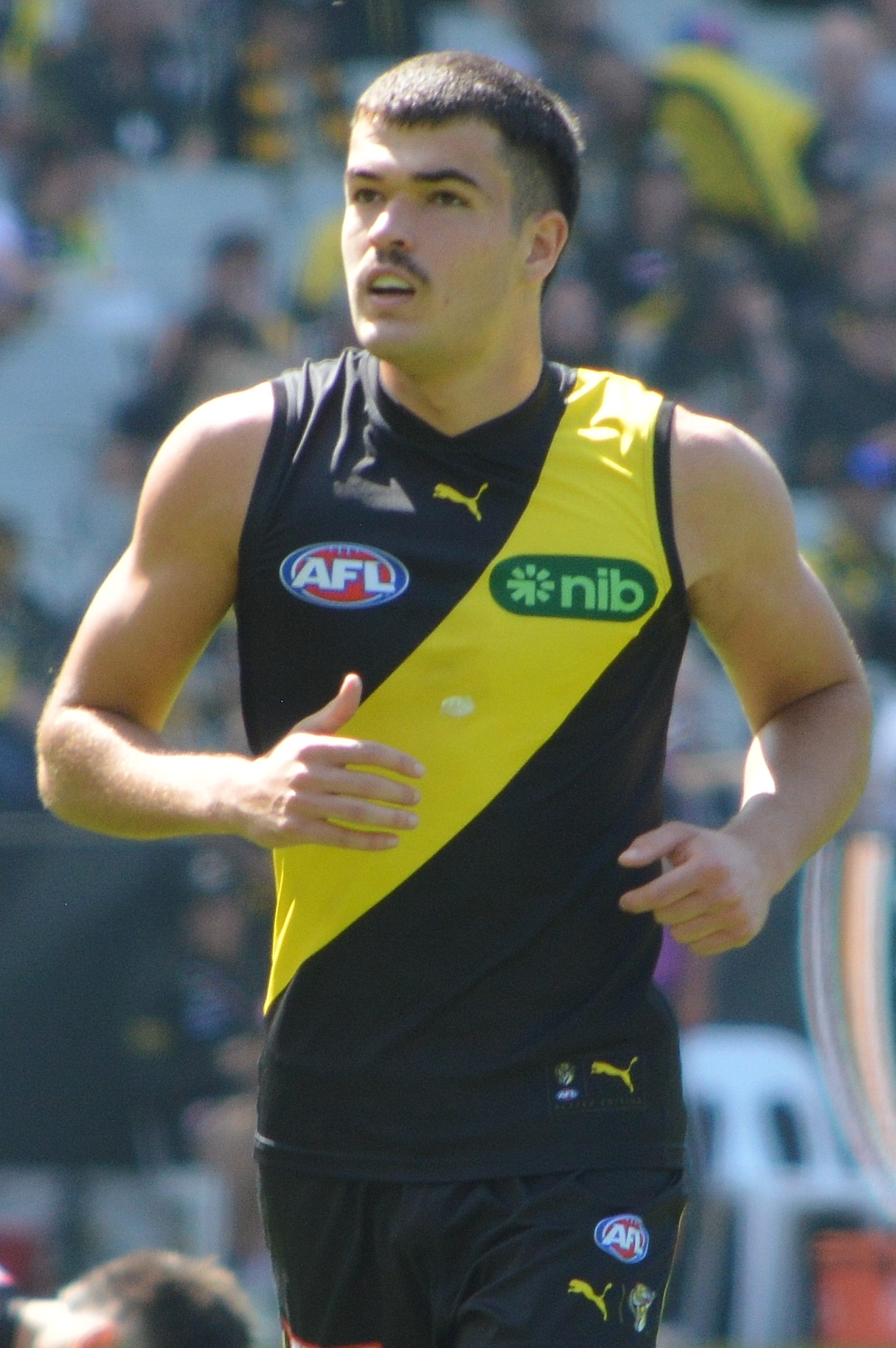
- Armstrong in March 2026

Personal information
- Born: 14 June 2006 (age 20)
- Original team: Sandringham Dragons (Talent League)/Ormond
- Draft: No. 23, 2024 AFL draft
- Debut: Round 1, 2025, Richmond vs. Carlton, at MCG
- Height: 195 cm (6 ft 5 in)
- Position: Key forward

Club information
- Current club: Richmond
- Number: 34

Playing career^{1}
Years	Club	Games (Goals)
2025–	Richmond	12 (7)
- ^{1} Playing statistics correct to the end of 2026.

Career highlights
- U18 All-Australian: 2024; Talent League Team of the Year: 2024

Harry Armstrong (born 14 June 2006) is an Australian rules footballer who plays for the Richmond Football Club in the Australian Football League (AFL). A mobile tall-forward, Armstrong was drafted in the first round of the 2024 AFL draft and made his debut early in the 2025 season.

== Early life and junior football ==
Armstrong grew up in the south-eastern suburbs, playing junior football with Ormond, representative football for Sandringham Dragons and attending school at McKinnon Secondary and later Haileybury. While at Haileybury, he worked closely with three time Coleman Medal winner Matthew Lloyd to improve his goal kicking. He grew up supporting Geelong.

He developed a staph infection in his hip in his second-last year of schooling, missing Haileybury's Associated Public Schools of Victoria grand final win over Caulfield Grammar in 2023. Despite missing that game, Armstorng finished the year as the competition's leading goalkicker.

Early in his final junior season, Armstrong kicked 10 goals in a school match against Melbourne Grammar. In total, he kicked 33 goals for his school that year and was named in the Herald Sun's APS team of the year.

Armstrong represented the Victorian Metropolitan region at the 2024 AFL Under 18 Championships. Despite missing the first match of the tournament with an ankle injury, Armstrong finished as the equal-highest goalkicker for all teams with nine, earning selection in the tournament's All-Australian side. He kicked a match-high five goals along with five marks and nine disposals in Metro's grand final victory over Victoria Country.

Armstrong kicked 27 goals across eight matches in Sandringham's 2024 Talent League season. Despite being affected during the season by a shoulder injury, Armstrong was ultimately selected in the league's Team of the Year.

== AFL career ==
Armstrong was drafted by Richmond with the club's sixth pick and the 23rd selection overall in the 2024 AFL draft. Armstrong made his debut in round 1 of the 2025 season, in a victory over Carlton at the MCG. He made his debut in the club's first match of the regular season; a round 1 victory over Carlton which also featured fellow first-round draftees Sam Lalor and Luke Trainor. The following week he kicked each of his first two AFL goals, along with 12 disposals and five marks in an away loss to Port Adelaide.

== Player profile ==
Armstrong plays as a tall-forward, notable for his mobility and endurance. He is a left foot kicker.

== Statistics ==
Updated to the end of round 22, 2026.

Legend
G	Goals	K	Kicks	D	Disposals	T	Tackles
B	Behinds	H	Handballs	M	Marks

Season	Team	No.	Games	Totals							Averages (per game)							Votes
Season	Team	No.	Games	G	B	K	H	D	M	T	G	B	K	H	D	M	T	Votes
2025	Richmond	34	8	6	6	29	24	53	23	4	0.8	0.8	3.6	3.0	6.6	2.9	0.5	0
2026	Richmond	34	3	1	1	8	2	10	7	1	0.3	0.3	2.7	0.7	3.3	2.3	0.3	0
Career			11	7	7	37	26	63	30	5	0.6	0.6	3.4	2.4	5.7	2.7	0.5	0
