= Christopher Lynch (businessman) =

Chris Lynch
- Born: Christopher James Lynch; 23 September 1953 (age 73); Broken Hill, New South Wales
- Education: Deakin University (BCom, MBA)
- Board member of: BHP Billiton (2006–07); AFL Commission (2007–14); Rio Tinto (2011–18); Westpac (2020–present)
Australian rules football career
Personal information
- Original team: North Broken Hill
- Height: 188 cm (6 ft 2 in)
- Weight: 89 kg (196 lb)
Playing career^{1}
Years	Club	Games (Goals)
1972–1974	Geelong	5 (2)
- ^{1} Playing statistics correct to the end of 1974.

Christopher James Lynch is an Australian businessman who is currently a director of Westpac. He is a former chief financial officer and board member of Anglo-Australian resources companies Rio Tinto and BHP Billiton, and a CEO of Transurban. Lynch was a member of the AFL Commission between 2008 and 2014. He played five matches for Geelong Football Club in the Victorian Football League (VFL, now AFL).

== Early life and education ==
Lynch was born in Broken Hill in Western New South Wales (NSW) in 1953. His grandfather, Paddy O'Neill, was a notable union leader in Broken Hill.

Lynch completed a Bachelor of Commerce (BCom) degree at the Gordon Institute of Technology (later known as Deakin University). He later completed a Master of Business Administration (MBA) from Deakin University. He is member of CPA Australia.

Lynch was a keen cricketer, representing Geelong against several international touring teams. He played three matches in Victorian Premier Cricket for Essendon Cricket Club during the 1982–83 season.

== Australian rules football career ==
After moving from Broken Hill, where he played for the North Broken Hill Football Club, Lynch played for Geelong Football Club, making his debut in the Victorian Football League (VFL, now AFL) in 1972. He played twice in 1972 and a further three times in 1974. He was a member of the Geelong team that won the VFL reserves premiership in 1975.

== Business life ==
Lynch joined Alcoa in 1979, where he rose through the levels, becoming chief financial officer, Alcoa Europe, in Lausanne, Switzerland. He was also managing director of KAAL Australia Ltd, a joint venture company formed by Alcoa and Kobe Steel. In 1999, Lynch was appointed vice president and chief information officer.

In 2000, Lynch was head-hunted by BHP Billiton as chief financial officer of the company's Minerals Group. He became chief financial officer of the group in September 2001. Lynch was appointed an executive director of BHP Billiton and member of its board in January 2006. He was subsequently appointed as group president of BHP Billiton's Carbon Steel Materials division in April 2006. After being passed over for the BHP Billiton CEO role, Lynch retired from the company in June 2007.

Lynch became CEO of Transurban in 2008, serving in the role until 2012.

He was elected a member of the AFL Commission at the end of 2007, retiring from the role in 2014.

In 2011, Lynch was appointed to the Rio Tinto board as a non-executive director. He was the chief financial officer of Rio Tinto from April 2013 to September 2018.

In 2020, Lynch joined the board of Australian bank Westpac.
