= Trainer, West Virginia =

- Unincorporated community
- Location within West Virginia Location within the United States
- Coordinates: 38°02′23″N 80°01′54″W
- Country: United States
- State: West Virginia
- County: Greenbrier
- Elevation: 2,241 ft (683 m)
- Time zone: UTC-5 (Eastern (EST))
  - Summer (DST): UTC-4 (EDT)
- Area codes: 304 & 681
- GNIS feature ID: 1555821

Trainer is an unincorporated community in Greenbrier County, West Virginia, United States. Trainer is located on West Virginia Route 92, 22 miles (35 km) northeast of White Sulphur Springs.
