= Gabrielle Trainor =

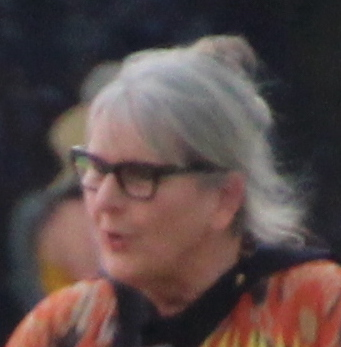
Trainor in 2022

Gabrielle Mary Trainor is an Australian business director. She is a board member of Infrastructure Australia and Western Sydney University. She previously chaired the National Film and Sound Archive.

Trainor became an Officer of the Order of Australia in the 2017 Queen's Birthday Honours "For distinguished service to the community through consultancy roles, particularly in the field of transport and infrastructure planning and design, and as a contributor to social welfare, sporting, and cultural institutions."

Trainor has been heavily involved in Australian rules football. She was an inaugural board member of the GWS Giants before joining the AFL Commission in 2016. The Gabrielle Trainor Medal is named in her honour. She is also the aunt of AFL player Luke Trainor.
