= Henry F. Bowers =

American lawyer

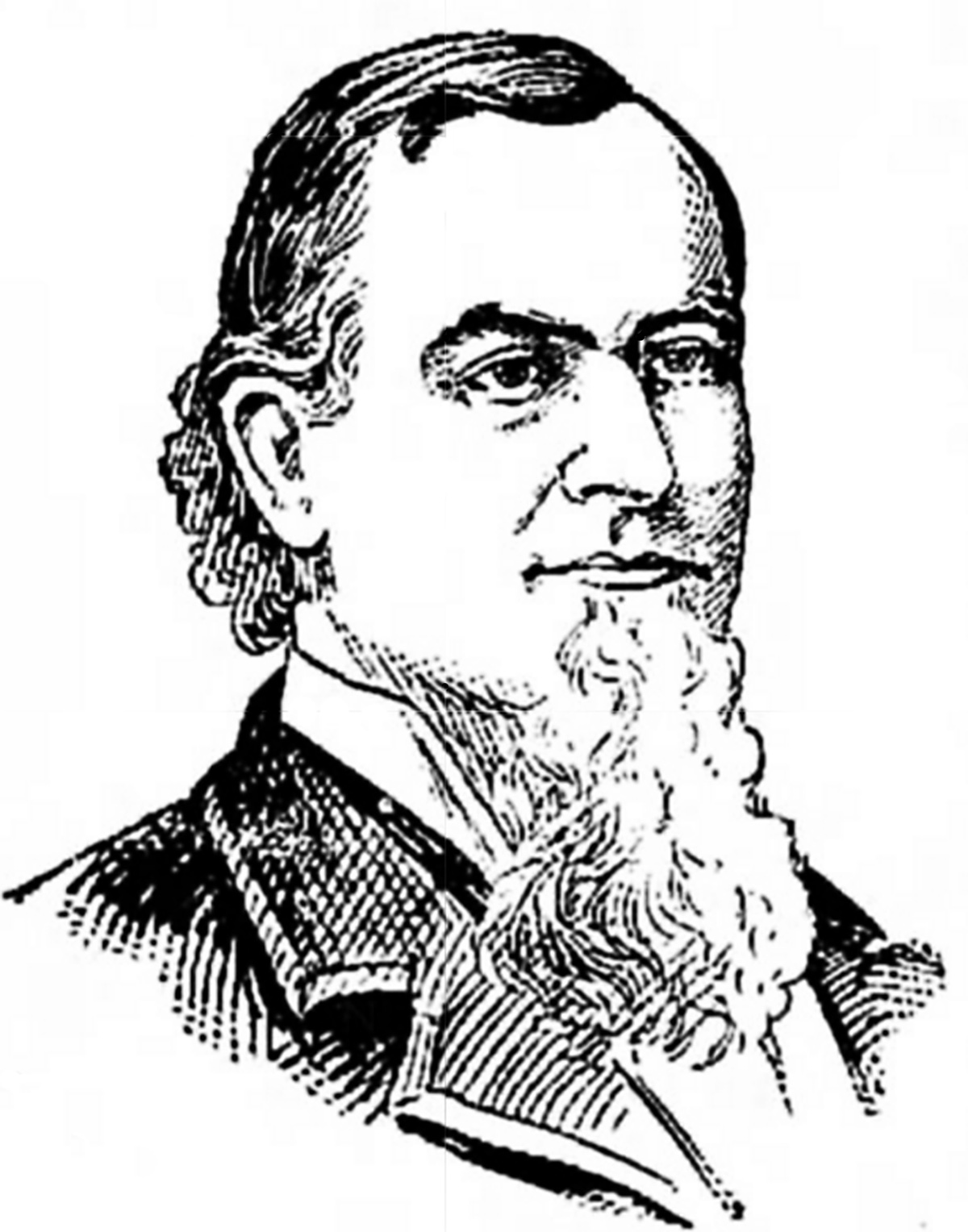
Henry F. Bowers as he appeared in 1896

Henry Francis Bowers (August 12, 1837 – November 9, 1911) was an American attorney and political activist. Bowers is best remembered as the founder of the American Protective Association, a staunchly anti-Catholic secret political society.

== Biography ==
=== Early years ===
Henry Francis Bowers was born in Baltimore, Maryland, on August 12, 1837. His father was an emigrant from the Rhineland region of Germany, who had been raised a Lutheran. He married the daughter of a New England Methodist family. An only child, Bowers was raised in his mother's religion, his father having died at sea while traveling to Europe when Henry was still young.

Bowers did not attend school as a boy, later blaming alleged Jesuit control of the public school system in Maryland during that period for his inability to obtain a formal education.

He grew up in Maryland during the era of Know Nothingism, leaving with his mother to settle on a farm in eastern Iowa in 1857. After three unsuccessful years of farming, Bowers learned the trade of cabinet-making. He briefly enlisted in the Union Army during the American Civil War, but soon contracted typhoid fever and was returned home to recover. Bowers spent the two years of his convalescence engaged in self-directed study.

The Republican partisan Bowers began taking an active interest in politics, gaining appointment as a deputy Clinton County clerk in 1863 and a deputy county recorder in 1869. He successfully ran for election as county recorder in 1870 and was reelected to that position in 1872.

Bowers studied law on an independent basis and passed the Iowa bar exam in 1870, becoming a licensed attorney. That same year Bowers married the former Emma B. Crawford, an Ohio native. The couple had three children together before the death of his wife in childbirth in 1878. His mother subsequently took over as homemaker for her son and grandchildren until her death in 1893.

Making use of his political connections, Bowers was appointed as a special aide-de-camp to Iowa Governor John Henry Gear in 1878, a post accompanied with the honorary rank of lieutenant colonel. He was sometimes known as "Colonel" Bowers in later years as a result of this post-war political appointment.

Henry F. Bowers died in Clinton, Iowa, on November 9, 1911.

=== American Protective Association ===
Bowers was an active Freemason from the decade of the 1870s and came to believe that the American republic was founded by Masons in opposition to the hegemony of the Roman Catholic Church. Believing Catholicism and Americanism to be incompatible doctrines, Bowers sought to bolster the latter with the establishment a new political society bearing certain structural forms derived from the secret ritualistic lodges of Masonry.

Working with a handful of like-minded friends in his office, on March 13, 1887, Bowers drew up a formal ritual and wrote a constitution for this new organization, to be called the "American Protective Association."

His demands for Catholics to remove themselves from politics, was because he saw Catholics as having dual loyalties. To Bowers they could not be both loyal to the United States and a pope in Rome. Historian Jo Ann Manfra argues that:

in 1893, Henry Bowers lost personal control of the APA to a vastly expanded national membership that replaced him with Michigan's William Traynor as supreme president. When Bowers regained its leadership in 1898, the organization was only a shadow of its former self, and what remained of the APA died with its founder in 1911.
