= Gabrielle Trainor Medal =

- Awarded for: The best and fairest player of the Greater Western Sydney Giants in the AFL Women's
- Country: Australia
- Presented by: Greater Western Sydney Giants
- First award: 2017
- Currently held by: Alyce Parker

In the AFL Women's (AFLW), the Gabrielle Trainor Medal is the name of the award given to the best and fairest player at the Greater Western Sydney Giants during the home-and-away season. The naming of the award is in honour of Gabrielle Trainor, an inaugural Giants board member and member of the AFL Commission known for pioneering the development of women's Australian rules football in New South Wales during her ten years on the AFL NSW/ACT Commission prior to joining the Giants. The award has been awarded annually since the competition's inaugural season in 2017, and Jess Dal Pos was the inaugural winner of the award.

== Recipients ==
**Bold**	Denotes current player
	Player won AFL Women's best and fairest in same season

Season	Recipient(s)	Ref.
2017	Jess Dal Pos	
2018	Alicia Eva	
2019	**Rebecca Beeson**	
2020	**Alyce Parker**	
2021	**Alyce Parker** (2)	
2022 (S6)	**Alyce Parker** (3)	
2022 (S7)	**Alyce Parker** (4)	
2023	**Zarlie Goldsworthy**	
2024	**Rebecca Beeson** (2)	
2025	**Zarlie Goldsworthy** (2)	
2026	**Alyce Parker** (5)	

== See also ==
- Kevin Sheedy Medal (list of Greater Western Sydney Giants best and fairest winners in the Australian Football League)
