= American Protestant Association =

American Protestant Association (APA) was the oldest American, exclusively anti-Roman Catholic secret society. It is believed to have been the prototype of the American Protective Association. It was established at Pittsburgh, Pennsylvania, and had five degrees, which, according to the Cyclopedia of Fraternities, "in connection with the personnel of its earlier membership, point to Orange sympathies." It is probable that American Protestant associations existed as long ago as the 1844, but it is also probable that the American Protestant Association was founded in 1849, because the "forty-fifth annual convention" of the Pennsylvania State Lodge was held at its natal city in 1895. The Association was active mainly in Pennsylvania. Its members were noted for their anti-Catholic tendencies. A schism, in 1884, gave rise to the "Order of American Freeman". The "Junior American Protestant Association", modelled probably after the original "junior order," that of the Sons of America, was founded in 1864, and like the Junior Order of United American Mechanics, afterwards declared its independence of the parent society, even going so far as to change its name, in 1890, to "Loyal Knights of America". A schismatic African-American branch of the American Protestant Association was formed in Pennsylvania, in 1849, and was still in existence in 1907.

== History ==
The APA was organized December 19, 1849. On January 9, 1850, they met in Union Hall, corner of Fifth and Smithfield Streets, Pittsburg, and elected Grand Lodge officers, William Shannon being the first Grand Master. At a meeting held December 5, 1850, overtures were received from the Protestant Benevolent Association of New York to send delegates to a meeting of that society held in that city; the result was a union of the bodies under the name of Protestant Association, the word American being subsequently prefixed. David Steen, William Shannon, Samuel A. Long and George Taylor were among the organizers.

It was not the Orange Institution and there is no affiliation between them. There was nothing on record as to what was the cause for forming the APA, but it was always understood that at that time, there was no Protestant society to which citizens of foreign birth could be admitted that had for its fundamental principles the maintenance of civil and religious liberty, and the maintenance of the Bible in public schools; hence the "APA was formed, to which all Protestants could be admitted.

The Association was strongly anti-Roman Catholic. Its total membership in 190 was placed at over 200,000, of which 75,000 were credited to Pennsylvania alone. Subordinate lodges were governed by State Lodges, and the latter sent representatives to the Right Worthy Grand Lodge of the United States. Following closely, as it did, the appearance of the Order of United American Mechanics at Philadelphia in 1845, and the Patriotic Order, United Sons of America at the same city in 1847, it also became identified with the Know Nothing party campaigns of 1850 to 1856. It was related that it was to the American Protestant Association that early native American newspapers were indebted for the so-called oath of the Roman Catholic priesthood, often quoted by Orange and other Protestant writers in discussing the church of Rome. With the rise of Know Nothingism, the APA and its allies or sympathizers, the Order of United American Mechanics, the Patriotic Order, Sons of America, and the Brotherhood of the Union, founded in 1850, were swept into the Know Nothing campaign of nativism and anti-Roman Catholicism, much as most of the members of the same societies were engulfed in the wave of the American Protective Association, 45 years later. Like other societies, the APA survived the Civil War. It worked along the lines of a purely American Orange association.

Unlike most of its companions, in its antagonism to Roman Catholic prominence in American public life, the APA suffered from schism and secession. At the meeting of the Right Worthy Grand Lodge of the mother association in 1884, it was ordered that two of the five degrees should thereafter be omitted. As 13 lodges refused to conform to the order, the Grand Lodge withdrew their charters and expelled their members, whereupon the latter held a convention and formed a similar society under the title Order of American Freemen. The Junior American Protestant Association, modelled probably after the original "Junior Order," that of the Sons of America, was founded in 1864, and like the Junior Order, United American Mechanics, afterward declared its independence of the parent society, even going so far as to change its name. This happened in 1890 at Wilkes-Barre, Pennsylvania, at a convention of the Junior Association, but not without much opposition. The new name chosen was Loyal Knights of America, and membership in the society was said to be composed mainly of Protestant Irish Americans. A schismatic African-American branch of the American Protestant Association, formed in Pennsylvania in 1849, was said to still be in existence in 1907.

In 1905, the association paid in sick benefits in the year US$76,472, and for funeral benefits, US$29,751.

== Principles ==
The APA was composed of American citizens, native and adopted. It was purely American in its character and Protestant in its principles. It required an unswerving support of the authority of the Government, and a strict obedience of its Constitution and laws. Its aims were to sustain right against the encroachments of wrong. Its teachings inculcated the largest charity. It enjoined upon all the principles of probity, rectitude and virtue, and the members pledged themselves to preserve inviolate that privilege, "Liberty of conscience," and to protect all good citizens from violence, oppression and wrong.

It upheld the public schools and the reading of the Holy Bible therein, without note or comment, and was opposed to any part of the school funds being used to disseminate sectarian views, whether Roman Catholic or Protestant. The order was not opposed to immigration, provided the seekers of homes in the U.S. left behind them their foreign ideas, and were willing to become American citizens and be governed by the laws and customs of the U.S.; but in its principles and teachings, it opposed in unmeasured terms the immigration of anarchists, Socialists and others of their ideas, and was strictly opposed to the importation of pauper labor.

The members of the association deprecated the idea that it was aggressively opposed to Catholicism.

== New York grand lodge ==
The APA became established in New York by 1850. Its membership was very largely Protestant Irish, and they were enthusiastic supporters of nativism, although not using their secret machinery for political work. The New York grand lodge was organized in 1853 by the nine lodges then existing. In the fall of 1854, it claimed nineteen lodges with 2,800 members, and by 1855, there were about thirty lodges, mostly in New York City and Brooklyn. The names of "Washington", "Jefferson", "Bunker Hill", and "Valley Forge" were typical names borne by the lodges and were significant of their attitude toward American ideas. Like other societies, the APA lost heavily after 1856 by the collapse of the nativist party, but it kept an existence in New York City for over 30 years before the last of its lodges died out.

== American Protestant Hall and Library Association ==
The APA had subordinate lodges acting under charters granted by the Grand Lodge of the State of Pennsylvania. which, in turn, received its charter from the Grand Lodge of the United States. Certain members of this organization, resident in Philadelphia, were incorporated as the "American Protestant Hall and Library Association", for the purpose of providing a hall and library for the accommodation of the lodges and use of the members of the APA.
