= American Protective Association =

Anti-Catholic secret society, 1887–1911

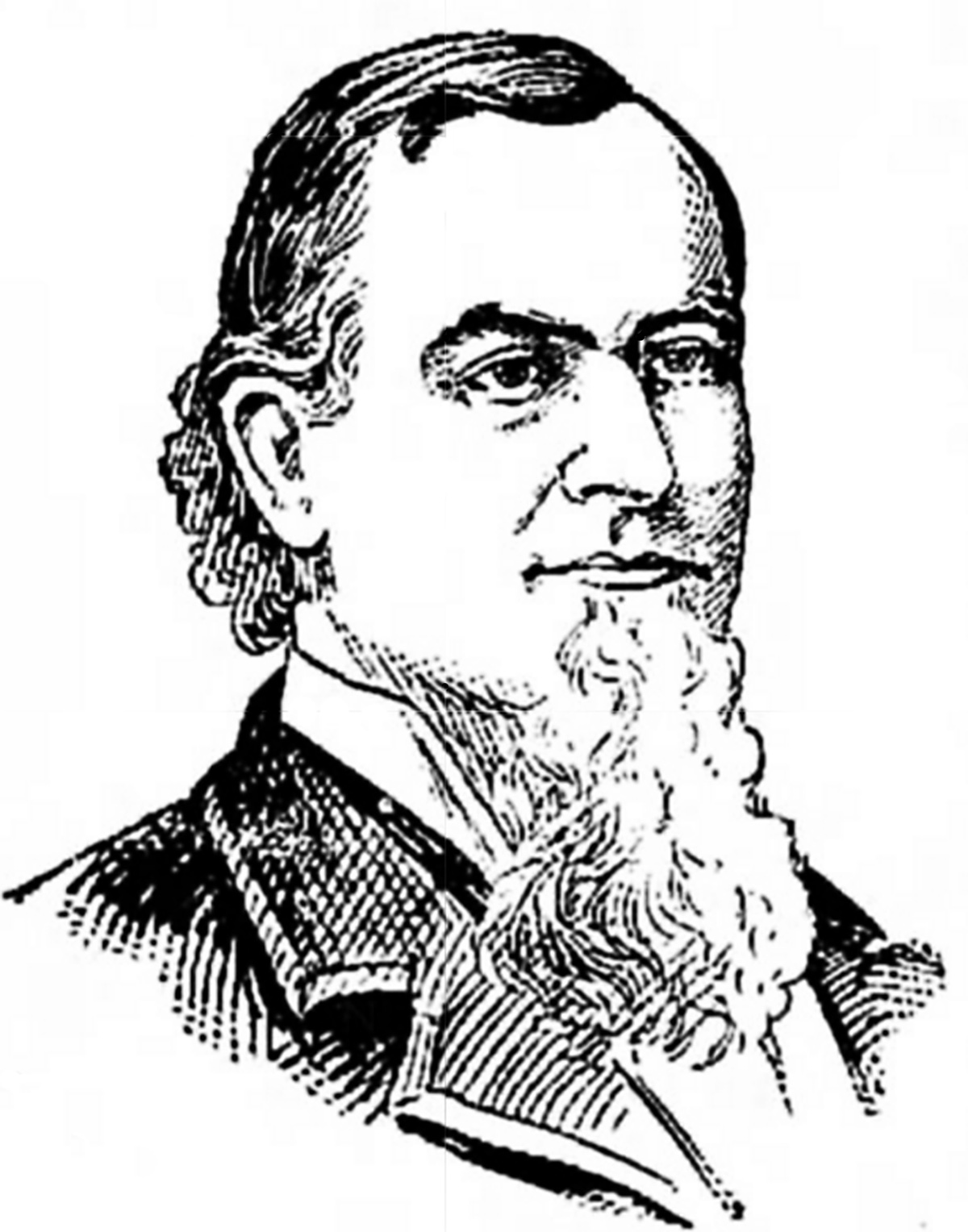
Henry F. Bowers (1837-1911), founder and long-time head of the American Protective Association.

The American Protective Association (APA) was an American anti-Catholic secret society established in 1887 by Protestants. The organization was the largest anti-Catholic movement in the United States during the later part of the 19th century, showing particular regional strength in the Midwest. The group grew rapidly during the early 1890s before collapsing just as abruptly in the aftermath of the election of 1896.

Unlike the more powerful Know Nothing movement of the 1850s, the APA did not establish its own independent political party, but rather sought to exert influence by boosting its supporters in campaigns and at political conventions, particularly those of the Republican Party. The organization was particularly concerned about Roman Catholic influence in the public school system as well as unfettered Catholic immigration and what was seen as growing Catholic control of the political establishments of major American cities.

Although it claimed a six-figure membership at its peak in early 1896, the organization's collapse was rapid, with only a hollow shell remaining by 1898. The rump organization was finally terminated in 1911 with the death of its founder.

== History ==
=== Establishment ===
On the afternoon of Sunday, March 13, 1887, a meeting was called in the Clinton, Iowa, law office of Henry F. Bowers to discuss the recent electoral defeat of incumbent mayor Arnold Walliker, which Bowers and others blamed on the organized efforts of Roman Catholics in the local organized labor movement. Seven men were in attendance, including the defeated former mayor and his brother. The decision was made by the seven men to establish a new political society to combat Catholic political influence, to be called the American Protective Association, and a constitution and Masonic-influenced ritual was drawn up for this new organization.

Bowers was elected the group's first "Supreme President." Aside from Bowers himself, there were six other founding members. Bowers would later relate that this "First Council" was composed of three Republicans, two Democrats, one Populist, and one Prohibitionist. The religious make-up of the First Council was said by Bowers to include members of the Methodist, Baptist, Presbyterian, Congregationalist, and Lutheran religious denominations, as well as "one of no religion."

During the APA's first two years the organization was small and regionally compact, with local councils limited to the Midwestern states of Iowa, Illinois, and Nebraska. No internal documents indicating the membership size of the early secret society exist, the organization's records having been destroyed in a fire. The organization was unquestionably tiny in this period, however, with membership topping the 11,000 mark only in the first weeks of 1892 — this after having "increased enormously" over the preceding six months.

=== Growth into a mass movement ===
W.J.H. Traynor, Supreme President of the American Protective Association from 1893 to 1896.

The years 1892 and 1893 initiated a period of dramatic growth in the size of the APA, and the secret society began capturing headlines in newspapers around the country. By September 1893 the head of the Buffalo, New York, local council of the APA – formerly a Loyal Orange Institution member from Toronto — boasted of more than 800 members in that city alone, and promised that "we are going to run this city just as the APA runs Kansas City, Detroit, Saginaw, and other cities of the West." Other cities in which the APA grew to exert powerful political influence during the middle years of the 1890s included Omaha, Rockford, Toledo, Duluth, and Louisville, with a slightly lesser impact in Rochester, St. Louis and Denver.

Growth of the APA during the early 1890s was spurred by the circulation of forged documents, including in particular a set of purported “instructions to Catholics” advising the faithful against "keeping faith with heretics," and another alleged Papal encyclical over the signature of Pope Leo XIII calling for Catholics to "exterminate all heretics" on or about St. Ignatius Day [September 5], 1893.

The Canadian-born W. J. H. Traynor, past Supreme Grand Master of the Loyal Orange Institution of the United States and editor of a weekly anti-Catholic newspaper from Detroit, The Patriotic American, succeeded Bowers as Supreme President in 1893. It would be he who would lead the group during its period of greatest influence during the mid-1890s. Traynor, the son of a building contractor, had joined the Orange Order at the age of 17 and maintained membership and connections with a host of religious and nationalist secret societies, including the Illustrious Order of the Knights of Malta, the American Patriot League, the American Protestant Association, and other similar organizations.

During the middle 1890s, the APA expanded from its Midwestern nexus to become a fully national organization, with Supreme President Traynor traveling extensively to help with establishment of new local councils. The organization seems to have legitimately crossed the 100,000 member threshold sometime in the middle of 1894, according to the sanguine estimate of Humphrey J. Desmond, published in 1912. Rather than citing its substantial and growing paid membership figures, however, the organization frequently made use of rhetorical diversion by trumpeting the number of votes it "controlled," with Traynor on a West coast organizing trip in February 1894 claiming to the press that the group had "control" of 2,000 votes in Tacoma, Washington (a town of 36,000 people) as part of 2 million votes "controlled" nationwide. The APA's systematic membership exaggeration was noted expressly by a disgruntled former APA lecturer and founder of a rival organization, Walter Sims, who declared in 1895 that for the APA there was "not a membership in the United States of 120,000, but they call it a million."

Membership claims by the APA actually far exceeded a mere exaggerated "million," with Supreme President Traynor claiming in June 1896 a membership for the organization of 2.5 million. Nor was this all, with the APA proudly announcing at a closed convention of the national organization in Rochester in January 1896 that the organization maintained an astounding voting strength of 3.5 million votes — which, when added to the clout of other "patriotic" organizations in alliance with the APA accounted for "more than one-fourth of the voting population of the United States."

The actual high watermark of APA membership actually lay "somewhere between the calculating boastfulness of Traynor and the resentful disparagement of Sims," Humphrey J. Desmond, the first serious scholar of the APA movement, would later declare.

The Association took an active part in the mid-term election of 1894 and off-year elections of 1895, in some jurisdictions running its own ticket, but more often supporting candidates from the main parties who agreed with its agenda. It often took credit for Republican victories, especially in the GOP landslide year of 1894. Thus it took credit with the election of John W. Griggs to the governorship of New Jersey, by bringing up his opponent's, Alexander T. McGill support of a Catholic protection bill in 1875. It also claimed it had an influence in the elections in Upstate New York during the same period. Its leader Traynor said the APA had twenty members of Congress as members; he boasted that one hundred members had been elected by it.

=== Decline and extinction ===
In December 1895, the APA played a dominant role in the organization of a convention of patriotic organizations to coordinate efforts in the upcoming 1896 electoral campaign. Joining the APA were representatives of the Loyal Orange Institution, the Junior Order of United American Mechanics, the League for the Protection of American Institutions, and other related groups — organizations which together fancifully claimed some 3 million adherents. The convention adopted a platform calling for restricted immigration, a halt to public money spent for ostensibly sectarian purposes, limitation of the vote to citizens alone, and equal taxation of all except public property, and formed committees to attend the national conventions of the various political parties in an effort to gain commitments for these principles into national party platforms.

The issue of Free silver and monetary policy proved to be all dominant in the 1896 campaign, however, and the agenda of the APA and its friends sank without a trace. The result proved a crushing disappointment for the APA and initiated a process of rapid membership decline.

In 1898 Henry F. Bowers regained leadership of the organization he had established, but by this date the APA had already been reduced to what one historian has called "a shadow of its former self." The organization closed permanently in 1911 after the death of its founder.

== Ideology and program ==
APA propaganda depicting the Pope as the master decision-maker controlling the White House, Congress, and federal financial and publishing institutions. (Art from an 1894 book.)

While the Association said it did not have any conflict with Catholicism or the Irish per se, they believed that the Roman Catholic Church was making inroads into the government of the United States with the goal of controlling it. They said that Catholics had congregated in areas of large cities, preventing the election of non-Catholics in those areas, that 60% to 90% of government employees were Catholic, often illiterate and current and hired on the basis of patronage, attacks on the public school system, the "remarkable" increase in untaxed church property and the "fact" that the army, navy "were almost entirely Romanized", "frequent desecration" of the American flag by priests and the federal government was controlled by the Jesuits. They said that Roman Catholics were under the complete political control of the Pope and were to required to obey its laws when they were in conflict with those of the state, citing the Papal encyclical issued by Leo XIII on January 10, 1890, Sapientiae Christianae.

The APAs program and stated aims included the "perpetual" separation of Church and State; maintenance of a free, non-sectarian public school system; prohibition of any government grant or special privilege to sectarian bodies; establishment of an educational qualification to vote, "purification of the ballot"; suspension of further immigration, and its resumption on guarantees of residence and educational qualifications; public inspections of all private schools, convents, monasteries, hospitals, educational and reformatory institutions. In New Jersey they were able to sponsor a "School Flag Act" and an act forbidding students from wearing religious garb in school.

Representatives of the group also made public announcements that the Roman Catholic Church had instigated the Civil War, during which they said Catholics and Irish made up large numbers of deserters, and that both Grover Cleveland and William McKinley were controlled by the Church.

Although a veil of secrecy cloaked early doctrinal documents, which later said to have only "feebly indicated" the APA's organizational aims, the 1894 national convention approved a 13-point statement of principles which was made public and published. This platform stated that "loyalty to true Americanism, which knows neither birthplace, race, creed, or party" was the "first requisite for membership" in the APA, and that the organization did not control the political affiliations of its members.

The group's fundamental opposition to Catholicism was spelled out in the third plank of the 1894 statement of principles, which declared that while the APA was "tolerant of all creeds," it nevertheless

"holds that subjection to and support of any ecclesiastical power, not created and controlled by American citizens, and which claims equal, if not greater, sovereignty than the government of the United States of America, is irreconcilable with American citizenship. It is therefore opposed to the holding of offices in National, State, or Municipal government by any subject or supporter of such ecclesiastical power."

The program further spelled out the APA's belief that "non-sectarian free public schools" constituted the "bulwark of American institutions" and protested against employment of so-called "subjects of un-American ecclesiastical power" as public school teachers or administrators. The document also called for a "prohibition of the importation of pauper labor" as a means of protecting "our citizen laborers" and for tighter standards in immigration and naturalization law.

Although regarded by historians as a nativist movement, the APA was not automatically hostile to immigrants — quite the contrary. Many members, perhaps a majority, were themselves foreign-born, including Irish Protestants, Britons, and Scandinavian Lutherans. The organization permitted African Americans to membership, with blacks elected representatives of their state organizations to national conventions of the organization. Segregated local councils for black members were organized in the Southern States in 1895 and 1896, but local councils in the North were integrated. There is no evidence of either widespread participation by Jews in the APA or official anti-Semitism as a part of organizational practice.

Citing immigration figures for the decade of the 1880s, which were said to have shown that 3.25 million of 6.3 million immigrants to America were Roman Catholic, one 1894 APA apologetic moved beyond the standard rationale of Papal political manipulation in arguing for a tightening of immigration standards for reasons of public safety:

"Most all of the better class of immigrants are Protestants. It remains that, almost entirely, the lowest class are Roman Catholics.... Among these are mostly found the train wreckers, robbers, plunderers, murderers, and assassins of the country.... In the large cities criminal statistics show that while Roman Catholics furnish about four percent of the population, they produce more than one-half of the crime, if we except those cities in which there is a large percent of negro criminals."

== Organizational structure ==
Although supreme power was nominally vested in a membership gathering at annual conventions each spring, in practice the APA was a centrally directed organization staffed by a "Supreme President," and other "Supreme" officers which included a Vice-President, two Secretaries (one actively working, one ceremonial), a Treasurer, Chaplain, and six others. These officers constituted a Supreme Executive Board that held day-to-day decision-making authority between conventions. Presidents of the various state councils of the APA and former officers were also accorded places on the Supreme Executive Board.

The Supreme President and the working Supreme Secretary were full-time, paid functionaries of the organization. The constitutional power accorded to the Supreme President was vast, including the ability to remove state officers at will — thereby making any organized dissent within the Supreme Executive Board between conventions highly problematic.

National headquarters were based in Chicago until 1896, at which time they were moved to Washington, D.C. After 1897 the attenuated organization maintained headquarters wherever the Supreme Secretary resided.

The primary form of organization was called a "local council," organized on a city-by-city basis, with the various local councils of a state joined into a statewide organization designated a "Superior Council." Multiple local councils could be organized within a single city, provided that at least 25 dues-paying members could be assembled, with charters issued by the Superior Council rather than the national organization. Dues were set at $1.00 per year, with an initial initiation fee of $1.00.

Local and state organizations were populated by sets of officers following the model of the national organization.

A Junior American Protective Association for boys and girls aged 14–21 was established at a meeting of the Supreme Council in Milwaukee on 12 May 1895. A women's auxiliary was established sometime prior to September 1891 as the Women's American Protective Association (WAPA).

== Ritual ==
A number of the APAs obligations and rituals were divulged in 1893–94, with the purported full ritual read into the Congressional Record on 31 Oct 1893 in the petition of Henry M. Youmans for the unseating of Representative William S. Linton.

== Press ==
An independent APA press developed in early 1893, and by 1894 the movement had seventy weeklies. The Association often used spurious canon laws, Jesuit and cardinal oaths and unauthenticated quotes from the Catholic press in their propaganda. It also sponsored lecture tours of "ex-nuns" and priests, who often turned out to be phonies.

== Legacy ==
In Ohio in 1914 a new group also calling itself the American Protective Association contributed anti-Catholicism to the defeats of Democratic candidate Timothy S. Hogan and incumbent Democratic Governor James M. Cox. A Missouri-based newspaper, "The Menace," depicted Hogan and Cox as puppets of the pope.

An affiliated organization was founded in Mexico City on September 8, 1895, called the Constitutional Reform Club. Its purpose was to "combat the growing power and prestige of the Catholic clergy and defend the public schools. The APA was also active in Canada, where it is said to have worked with the Orangemen and "is said to have controlled elections in the chief cities of the Dominion in 1894 and 1895." In England they also apparently worked with the Orange Lodge. They were also reportedly active in Australia.

== See also ==
- Anti-Catholicism
- Immigration Restriction League
- Know Nothing movement
- Protestant Protective Association, a spinoff group in Canada
- Timeline of riots and civil unrest in Omaha, Nebraska
