= Colin Carter (footballer) =

Australian rules footballer

Personal information
- Full name: Colin Carter
- Born: 26 February 1955 (age 71)
- Original team: Cheltenham YCW
- Height: 183 cm (6 ft 0 in)
- Weight: 76 kg (168 lb)
- Position: Wing

Playing career^{1}
Years	Club	Games (Goals)
1975–77, 1979–80	St Kilda	49 (16)
- ^{1} Playing statistics correct to the end of 1980.

Colin Carter (born 26 February 1955) is a former Australian rules footballer who played with St Kilda in the Victorian Football League (VFL).
