= Nicholas Trainor =

English cricketer (born 1975)

Personal information
- Full name: Nicholas James Trainor
- Born: 29 June 1975 (age 51); Gateshead, County Durham, England
- Batting: Right-handed
- Role: Batsman

Domestic team information
- Years: Team
- 1996–1998: Gloucestershire

Career statistics
Competition	FC	List A
Matches	30	18
Runs scored	1060	483
Batting average	20.38	30.18
100s/50s	1/6	1/2
Top score	121	143
Balls bowled	354	228
Wickets	3	2
Bowling average	59.00	90.00
5 wickets in innings	0	0
10 wickets in match	0	0
Best bowling	3/42	2/25
Catches/stumpings	17/0	4/0
- Source: Cricinfo, 28 July 2013

Nicholas Trainor (born 29 June 1975) is a former English cricketer. He played for Gloucestershire between 1996 and 1998.
