= Larry Trainor =

American political activist

Larry Trainor (April 20, 1905 – July 22, 1975) was a leading activist of the Socialist Workers Party (US) in Boston and a member of the party's National Committee.

Trainor was a noted socialist educator, giving classes on Marxism, the history of the American socialist and Trotskyist movements and especially on Stalinism. He was the author of an extensive oral history of American socialism.

Barry Sheppard wrote: "Larry had no formal higher education, but he knew more about politics and the world than any professor I had ever known...a true worker-intellectual, always reading when he was not explaining something. He had a very strong character."

Trainor's role in discussions of organizational questions in the SWP in the 1960s is referred to in articles by George Breitman and Frank Lovell.
