= Wes Trainor =

Canadian ice hockey player

- Born: September 11, 1922 Charlottetown, Prince Edward Island, Canada
- Died: November 21, 1991 (aged 69)
- Height: 5 ft 8 in (173 cm)
- Weight: 180 lb (82 kg; 12 st 12 lb)
- Position: Centre/Left wing
- Shot: Right
- Played for: New York Rangers
- Playing career: 1940–1954

Thomas Weston "Bucko" Trainor (September 11, 1922 – November 21, 1991) was a Canadian ice hockey player. He played 17 games in the National Hockey League with the New York Rangers during the 1948–49 season. The rest of his career, which lasted from 1940 to 1956, was spent in the minor and senior leagues.

== Biography ==
Trainor was born at Charlottetown, Prince Edward Island to Joseph John Trainor and Johanna Shea.

After playing with the Canadian Army in the United Kingdom during the Second World War, Wes "Bucko" Trainor was a hockey player in the Maritimes and Newfoundland through the late 1940s and 1950s. He also coached senior and minor hockey in Grand Falls and Gander. He was enshrined in the PEI Sports Hall of Fame as an Athlete, and in the Sport Newfoundland and Labrador Hall of Fame as an Athlete-Builder.

== Career statistics ==
=== Regular season and playoffs ===
			Regular season					Playoffs
Season	Team	League	GP	G	A	Pts	PIM	GP	G	A	Pts	PIM
1937–38	Charlottetown Royals	PEI Jr	3	2	3	5	0	2	2	2	4	2
1938–39	Charlottetown Royals	PEI Jr	9	6	8	14	2	4	4	3	7	0
1939–40	Charlottetown Royals	PEI Jr	—	—	—	—	—	10	8	5	13	6
1939–40	Charlottetown Army	PEI Sr	5	7	6	13	8	—	—	—	—	—
1939–40	Charlottetown Royals	M-Cup	—	—	—	—	—	6	4	2	6	6
1940–41	Petawawa Grenades	UOVHL	18	18	17	35	15	5	5	3	8	5
1940–41	Petawawa Grenades	Al-Cup	—	—	—	—	—	4	3	9	12	9
1945–46	Drummondville Intrepids	QSHL	31	18	24	42	27	—	—	—	—	—
1946–47	Moncton Hawks	MMHL	37	20	45	65	42	9	4	11	15	8
1947–48	St. Paul Saints	USHL	35	7	8	15	22	—	—	—	—	—
1948–49	New York Rangers	NHL	17	1	2	3	6	—	—	—	—	—
1948–49	St. Paul Saints	USHL	49	19	49	68	43	—	—	—	—	—
1949–50	New Haven Ramblers	AHL	44	6	16	22	21	—	—	—	—	—
1949–50	St. Paul Saints	USHL	14	3	6	9	11	3	1	0	1	0
1950–51	Charlottetown Islanders	MMHL	72	25	73	98	81	11	4	7	11	8
1951–52	Charlottetown Islanders	MMHL	76	13	43	56	47	4	0	1	1	2
1952–53	Grand Falls-Windsor Cataracts	NLSHL	10	3	9	12	33	—	—	—	—	—
1952–53	Grand Falls All-Stars	NLSHL	—	—	—	—	—	4	0	3	3	8
1953–54	Charlottetown Islanders	MMHL	65	18	47	65	36	7	0	3	3	9
1954–55	Grand Falls All-Stars	NLSHL	7	1	3	4	2	4	1	2	3	2
1955–56	Grand Falls Andcos	NLSHL	—	—	—	—	—	1	0	0	0	0
MMHL totals			250	76	208	284	206	31	8	22	30	27
NHL totals			17	1	2	3	6	—	—	—	—	—
