= Ted Trainer =

- Born: F.E. Trainer; 1941 (age 84–85)
- Years active: 1975–present

Academic background
- Education: PhD
- Alma mater: University of Sydney
- Thesis: A study of orientations to social rules: with special reference to autonomy and some educational implications (1975)

Academic work
- Institutions: University of New South Wales
- Website: http://thesimplerway.info/

Ted (F.E.) Trainer (born 1941) is an Australian academic, author, and an advocate of economic degrowth, eco-anarchism, simple living, and 'conserver' lifestyles. He is a retired lecturer from the School of Social Work, University of New South Wales. He has written numerous books and articles on sustainability and is developing Pigface Point, an alternative lifestyle educational site near Sydney.

== Background ==
Trainer grew up in Sydney, Australia. He has a PhD from the University of Sydney ("A study of orientations to social rules: with special reference to autonomy and some educational implications", 1975) and lectured in education at the University of New South Wales from the 1970s. In the 1980s he shifted gears to join the growing environmental and limits to growth movement in Australia, and became a frequent speaker and activist, largely in New South Wales. He remained teaching at UNSW for several decades, usually delivering an undergraduate course on global problems. He was for many years an Honorary Adjunct Associate Professor in Social Work at UNSW, choosing to work part-time, and also a member of the Melbourne-based Simplicity Institute.

His practical energy has been thrown into Pigface Point, an alternative lifestyle educational site on a swampy meander of the St. George's River 20 km from Sydney, near East Hills/Voyager Point. Trainer lives there with his family, practising voluntary simplicity and the art of re-use. He lives partially in a barter and subsistence economy, and built a house and the grounds from recycled materials and manual labour. His household uses 2% of average Australian electricity consumption and he rarely travels. His site is used as a model to show people how to create an interconnected, resourced and equipped ‘village’ / housing complex. Photos show the extent of the property, which was originally purchased by his father in 1940.

== Contributions ==
A prolific author, Trainer has published widely on global problems, sustainability issues, radical critiques of the economy, alternative social forms, and the transition to them. He has written numerous books and articles on these topics, listed below.

His theory of social change is called "The Simpler Way". He argues "A sustainable world order is not possible unless we move to much less production and consumption, and much less affluent lifestyles within a steady-state economic system." In The Conserver Society he outlines what such a world would look like, based around intelligent and networked eco-villages providing healthy lifestyles, work and education with much-lowered net consumption.

His calculations of global energy demand, given in Trainer 2007, suggest any shift to renewable energy will have to be accompanied by a radical decrease in global demand, since renewables could not cope with expanding demand.

He maintains a large website of materials for critical global educators. His ideas, pursued in conferences and academic publications, on less resource use and lowered population have distanced him from some idealistic environmentalists, Marxist thinkers wanting to continue industrialism, as well as from pro-growth supporters of individualistic free markets and economic growth.

== Recognition ==
Samuel Alexander and Jonathan Rutherford (eds.). 2020. The Simpler Way: Collected Writings of Ted Trainer. Simplicity Institute Publishing.

== See also ==
- Anarchism in Australia

== Books ==
- Trainer, F.E. 2017. La vía de la simplicidad : hacia un mundo sostenible y justo (trans. Adrián Almazán Gómez). Editorial Trotta, Madrid, Spain. ISBN 978-84-9879-658-2 (Updated and adapted translation of The Transition to a Sustainable and Just World.)
- Trainer, F.E. 2010. The Transition to a Sustainable and Just World. Sydney: Environbooks. ISBN 978-0-8588-1238-3
- Trainer, F.E. 2007. Renewable Energy Cannot Sustain a Consumer Society. Springer.
- Trainer, F.E. 2001. We must move to the simpler way: an outline of the global situation, the sustainable alternative society, and the transition to it. Burton, S.A.: Critical Times Publishing.
- Trainer, F.E. 1998. Saving the Environment: What It Will Take. New South Wales University Press.
- Trainer, F.E. 1995. Towards a sustainable economy. Sydney: Environbooks.
- Trainer, F.E. 1995. The Conserver Society: Alternatives for Sustainability. London: Zed Books. ISBN 978-1-8564-9276-8
- Trainer, F.E. 1991. The Nature of Morality: An Introduction to the Subjectivist Perspective. Aldershot: Avebury Press.
- Trainer, F.E. 1989. Developed to Death: Rethinking Third World Development. Devon: GreenPrint.
- Trainer, F.E. 1985. Abandon Affluence!. London: Zed.
- Trainer, F.E. 1984. Third world development. Series: Critical social issues. School of Education, University of New South Wales
- Trainer, F.E. 1982. Dimensions of moral thought. Sydney: New South Wales University Press.
