= Stephen Trainer =

Scottish footballer

Personal information
- Place of birth: Coatbridge, Scotland
- Positions: Outside right; right back

Senior career*
Years	Team	Apps	(Gls)
1906–1907	Burnley	3	(0)
1913–1915	Albion Rovers	38	(0)
Total		41	(0)
- * Club domestic league appearances and goals

T. Stephen Trainer was a Scottish professional footballer who played as an outside right. Born in Coatbridge, he made three appearances in the Football League Second Division for Burnley in the 1906–07 season. He later played in the Scottish Football League for hometown club Albion Rovers, operating as a right back.
