= Bobby Trainor =

Northern Irish footballer

Personal information
- Date of birth: 25 April 1934
- Place of birth: Northern Ireland
- Date of death: 2020 or 2021
- Position: Outside right

Senior career*
Years	Team	Apps	(Gls)
1956–1959	Coleraine	?	(15)
1959–1960	Corby Town		
1960	Glentoran	4	(2)
1960–1963	Coleraine	13	(4)
1963–1965	Limavady United		

International career
- Northern Ireland
- * Club domestic league appearances and goals

Robin Trainor (25 April 1934 – 2020 or 2021) was a Northern Irish association footballer. He played as an outside right for Coleraine F.C., and won five Northern Ireland amateur caps (1958–1959), and two Irish League caps (1957–1958), and was a non-travelling member of the 1958 World Cup squad. Trainor died in late 2020 or early 2021.
