= Bob Trainer =

Australian rules footballer (1927–1982)

Personal information
- Full name: Bob Trainer
- Born: 15 September 1927
- Died: 14 June 1982 (aged 54)
- Original team: Port Melbourne / South Districts
- Height: 183 cm (6 ft 0 in)
- Weight: 80 kg (176 lb)

Playing career^{1}
| Years | Club | Games (Goals) |
| 1950 | South Melbourne | 3 (3) |
- ^{1} Playing statistics correct to the end of 1950.

Bob Trainer (15 September 1927 – 14 June 1982) was an Australian rules footballer who played with South Melbourne in the Victorian Football League (VFL).
