= Melissa Trainer =

American biochemist

Melissa G. Trainer (born April 22, 1978) is an American astrobiologist who in 2004 demonstrated empirically that life could have formed on Earth through the interaction of methane, carbon dioxide and ultraviolet light (sunlight). She is Assistant Chief for Science, Operations, and Strategic Planning in the Planetary Environments Laboratory at NASA's Goddard Space Flight Center.

== Early life and education ==
Raised in northern New Jersey since the age of four, Trainer attended Hackensack High School, from which she graduated as Valedictorian in 1996.

She completed her Bachelor of Arts degree at Franklin and Marshall College in Lancaster, Pennsylvania in 2000, graduating Magna Cum Laude with a major in Chemistry and a minor in Abstract Mathematics.

She completed her Ph.D. in Chemistry from the University of Colorado Boulder in 2006, where she worked with Margaret A. Tolbert. Her dissertation was “Laboratory Studies of Organic Haze Aerosols in Simulated Planetary Atmospheres”.

== Research ==
As a doctoral student with Melissa A. Tolbert at the University of Colorado at Boulder in the Department of Chemistry and Biochemistry and the Cooperative Institute for Research in the Environmental Sciences, working in the field of atmospheric chemistry, Trainer conducted two experimental studies on the formation of aerosols (tholins) in the early atmosphere of Earth and the current atmosphere of Titan. Project investigator Owen Toon reported, "As had been predicted in some theoretical studies we found that the production rate of aerosols declines as the abundance of CO_{2} relative to methane increases in simulated terrestrial atmospheres."

Trainer and her coexperimenters reported on their findings in Astrobiology in a 2004 paper called "Haze Aerosols in the Atmosphere of Early Earth: Manna from Heaven". She later presented the findings at the 2006 NASA Astrobiology Science Conference (AbSciCon) in March 2006 where she was recognized for her work.

Trainer was a graduate research assistant at the University of Colorado, Boulder from 2000 to 2006, and a postdoctoral fellow at NASA's Astrobiology Institute from 2006 to 2009. As of 2009 she became a planetary atmospheric chemist at Goddard Space Flight Center. As of 2015, she became Assistant Chief for Science, Operations, and Strategic Planning in the Planetary Environments Laboratory at NASA's Goddard Space Flight Center.

Trainer continues to study the properties of Titan and early Earth aerosol analogs, using a wide variety of techniques including chemical, optical, and isotopic characterizations of analogs. She is active in astrobiology projects examining Mars, Titan, Venus.

== Dragonfly mission ==
On June 27, 2019, NASA selected the Dragonfly mission to Titan as the next project of the New Frontiers exploration program. Trainer is the co-Deputy Principal Investigator.
