= Mike Trainor =

American stand-up comedian and writer (born 1981)

- Trainor in 2009
- Born: Michael Trainor; February 6, 1981 (age 45); West Orange, New Jersey, U.S.

Comedy career
- Years active: 2003–present
- Medium: Stand-up
- Genre: Observational comedy

Mike Trainor (born February 6, 1981) is an American stand-up comedian and writer. until July 2026 he served as a writer, producer, and former on-air performer for The Howard Stern Show, and has several recurring characters on the show including Jeff the Drunk's "Lump", Bobo's "Toupee", the Hulk, and others. He also provided commentary on the TruTV series World's Dumbest....

== Personal life ==
Trainor grew up in West Orange, New Jersey. He began performing stand-up comedy in the summer of 2003 after graduating from Elon University. Trainor is a member of the Kappa Alpha Order.

== Career ==
Trainor began his career in New York City. Trainor also started off his career working for the radio stations Q104.3 and WCBS 880 and at the television news station NY1. Trainor has been featured in Maxim Magazine and for a while was a regular contributor to CollegeHumor.com. From 2004 to 2006 he was the co-host and producer of the show "Four Quotas" on Sirius Satellite Radio alongside Steve Hofstetter. In 2012 Trainor was featured in a Golden Corral ad campaign.

Trainor was a writer and producer for The Howard Stern Show. He also provided humorous commentary on the show TruTV Presents: World's Dumbest....

=== Publishing ===
In 2009, Trainor released a book, Fat Things: They Might Not Make You Fat, But You Have Them in Common with Fat People, published by Giant Books.

=== Albums ===
In 2010, Trainor released his first comedy album, Giant, via Next Round Entertainment.
