= Luke Trainor (footballer, born 2006) =

Australian rules footballer (born 2006)

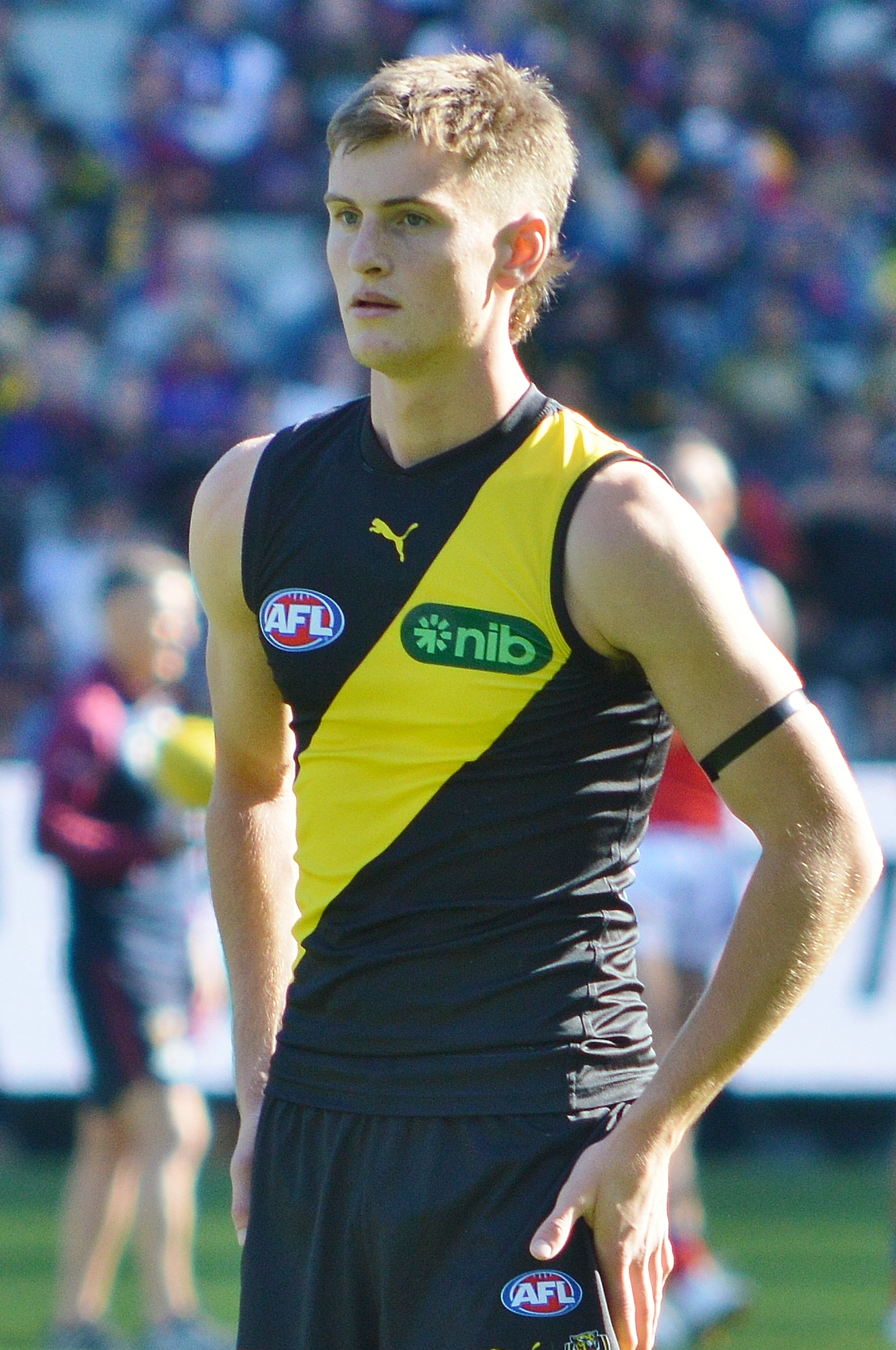
- Trainor in April 2025

Personal information
- Full name: Luke Trainor
- Nickname: Train
- Born: 10 April 2006 (age 20)
- Original team: Sandringham Dragons (Talent League)
- Draft: No. 21, 2024 AFL draft
- Debut: Round 1, 2025, Richmond vs. Carlton, at MCG
- Height: 195 cm (6 ft 5 in)
- Position: Defender

Club information
- Current club: Richmond
- Number: 11

Playing career^{1}
Years	Club	Games (Goals)
2025–	Richmond	32 (1)
- ^{1} Playing statistics correct to the end of 2026.

Career highlights
- AFL Rising Star nominee: 2025; U18 All-Australian: 2024; Talent League Team of the Season: 2024; U16 All-Australian: 2022

Luke Trainor (born 10 April 2006) is an Australian rules footballer who plays for the Richmond Football Club in the Australian Football League (AFL). A tall intercepting defender, Trainor was drafted in the first round of the 2024 AFL draft and made his debut early in the 2025 season.

== Early life and junior football ==
Trainor played junior representative football with the Sandringham Dragons and attended high school at Brighton Grammar School. In his early years he played primarily as a forward and a midfielder, only switching to defence in 2024.

In 2022, Trainor represented the Victorian Metropolitan region at the national under 16 championships, where he was named in the tournament's All-Australian Team. In the summer of 2023/24, Trainor took part in the AFL Academy program, training with St Kilda over the summer and being awarded best on ground in a special exhibition match against VFL team Coburg. At this time, he was considered by draft experts to be a potential top-five pick in the forthcoming 2024 AFL draft.

Trainor represented Victoria Metro at the 2024 AFL Under 18 Championships, playing four matches, averaging 19.8 disposals and 5.8 marks per game and earning selection in the tournament's All-Australian team. Trainor kicked the winning goal for his side after the final siren in Metro's grand final victory over Victoria Country.

He also won the Associated Public Schools of Victoria championship with Brighton Grammar in 2024, as part of the school's undefeated season. For his performances, Trainor was named in the Herald Sun's APS team of the year.

In the same year, Trainor's representative side, the Sandringham Dragons, claimed the Talent League premiership, though Trainor missed playing most of the finals series with a concussion sustained in an earlier match. He finished the season averaging 19.8 disposals, 5.6 marks, 2.4 intercept marks and 6 intercept possessions per game and was selected in the league's Team of the Year.

In the week prior to the 2024 AFL draft, Trainor was projected by AFL Media and the Herald Sun to be selected with the 28th and 29th pick, respectively.

== AFL career ==
Trainor was drafted by Richmond with the club's fifth pick and the 21st selection overall in the 2024 AFL draft. He recorded 12 disposals and four marks in Richmond's only official pre-season match and subsequently earned selection for an AFL debut in the club's first match of the regular season; a round 1 victory over Carlton which also featured the debuts of fellow first-round draftees Sam Lalor and Harry Armstrong. After three matches, Trainor was ranked second among 2025 AFL Rising Star eligible players for both metres gained and one-percenters as well as third for kicks and marks that season.

Trainor played his first senior game for Richmond in their round 3 match against Fremantle. He recorded a career high 28 disposals and 9 marks.

== Player profile ==
Trainor plays as a hybrid defender, with particular skills in intercepting and rebounding from defence. His playing style was compared pre-draft to Geelong's Tom Stewart.

== Personal life ==
Trainor is the grandson of Australian Football Hall of Fame inductee Doug Wade, nephew of AFL Commission member and former Greater Western Sydney board member Gabrielle Trainor, grandson of Tony Trainor who served as North Melbourne President from 1965 to 1971 and great-grandson of Frank Trainor who was President of the same club from 1937 to 1952.

== Statistics ==
Updated to the end of round 22, 2026.

Legend
G	Goals	K	Kicks	D	Disposals	T	Tackles
B	Behinds	H	Handballs	M	Marks

Season	Team	No.	Games	Totals							Averages (per game)							Votes
Season	Team	No.	Games	G	B	K	H	D	M	T	G	B	K	H	D	M	T	Votes
2025	Richmond	31	21	1	7	196	97	293	83	35	0.0	0.3	9.3	4.6	14.0	4.0	1.7	0
2026	Richmond	11	9	0	0	87	39	126	47	18	0.0	0.0	9.7	4.3	14.0	5.2	2.0	0
Career			30	1	7	283	136	419	130	53	0.0	0.2	9.4	4.5	14.0	4.3	1.8	0
