= Luke Trainor (footballer, born 1900) =

Australian rules footballer, born 1900

Personal information
- Full name: Luke Leonard Trainor
- Born: 17 December 1900; St Kilda, Victoria
- Died: 17 November 1973 (aged 72); Brunswick, Victoria
- Original team: Old Haileyburians

Playing career^{1}
Years	Club	Games (Goals)
1926	St Kilda	4 (4)
- ^{1} Playing statistics correct to the end of 1926.

Luke Leonard Trainor (17 December 1900 – 17 November 1973) was an Australian rules footballer who played with St Kilda in the Victorian Football League (VFL).

In 1933, Trainor played with Myrtleford in the Ovens and King Football League.
