= 2017 AFL Women's All-Australian team =

- Sponsored by: Virgin Australia
- Date: 28 March 2017
- Venue: Docklands Stadium
- Country: Australia

The 2017 AFL Women's All-Australian team represents the best-performed players of the 2017 AFL Women's season. It was announced on 28 March 2017 as a complete women's Australian rules football team of 22 players, the first and only time that this happened before teams in the AFL Women's were reduced to 21 players in 2018. The team is honorary and does not play any games.

== Selection panel ==
The selection panel for the 2017 AFL Women's All-Australian team consisted of Simon Lethlean, Mark Evans, Josh Vanderloo, Jennie Loughnan, Kevin Sheehan, Peta Searle, Darren Flanigan, Kelli Underwood, Ros Lanigan and Shelley Ware.

== Initial squad ==
The initial 40-woman All-Australian squad was announced on 23 March. Minor premiers Brisbane had the most players selected in the initial squad with nine, with players from grand finalists Adelaide and Brisbane making up more than one-third of the squad.

Club	Total	Player(s)
Adelaide	5	Courtney Cramey, Ebony Marinoff, Sarah Perkins, Erin Phillips, Chelsea Randall
Brisbane	9	Kaitlyn Ashmore, Emily Bates, Sabrina Frederick-Traub, Tayla Harris, Leah Kaslar, Kate McCarthy, Sam Virgo, Jess Wuetschner, Emma Zielke
Carlton	4	Brianna Davey, Alison Downie, Danielle Hardiman, Darcy Vescio
Collingwood	5	Jess Cameron, Sarah D'Arcy, Alicia Eva, Emma King, Nicola Stevens
Fremantle	4	Ebony Antonio, Kirby Bentley, Kara Donnellan, Dana Hooker
Greater Western Sydney	4	Jessica Dal Pos, Erin McKinnon, Emma Swanson, Renee Tomkins
Melbourne	6	Jasmine Grierson, Melissa Hickey, Lily Mithen, Elise O'Dea, Karen Paxman, Daisy Pearce
Western Bulldogs	3	Ellie Blackburn, Emma Kearney, Hannah Scott

== Final team ==
The final team was announced on 28 March. Grand finalists Adelaide and Brisbane had the most representatives with five each, and every team had at least one representative. Melbourne captain Daisy Pearce was announced as the All-Australian captain and Adelaide co-captain Erin Phillips was announced as the vice-captain.

2017 AFL Women's All-Australian team
B:	Nicola Stevens (Collingwood)	Courtney Cramey (Adelaide)	
HB:	Chelsea Randall (Adelaide)	Brianna Davey (Carlton)	Karen Paxman (Melbourne)
C:	Elise O'Dea (Melbourne)	Daisy Pearce (Melbourne) (captain)	Emma Kearney (Western Bulldogs)
HF:	Erin Phillips (Adelaide) (vice-captain)	Sabrina Frederick-Traub (Brisbane)	Ellie Blackburn (Western Bulldogs)
F:	Sarah Perkins (Adelaide)	Darcy Vescio (Carlton)	
Foll:	Emma King (Collingwood)	Kara Donnellan (Fremantle)	Emily Bates (Brisbane)
Int:	Jessica Dal Pos (Greater Western Sydney)	Kate McCarthy (Brisbane)	Ebony Marinoff (Adelaide)
Int:	Tayla Harris (Brisbane)	Melissa Hickey (Melbourne)	Sam Virgo (Brisbane)
Coach:	Bec Goddard (Adelaide)		

Note: the position of coach in the AFL Women's All-Australian team is traditionally awarded to the coach of the premiership-winning team.
