= 2017 AFL Women's best and fairest =

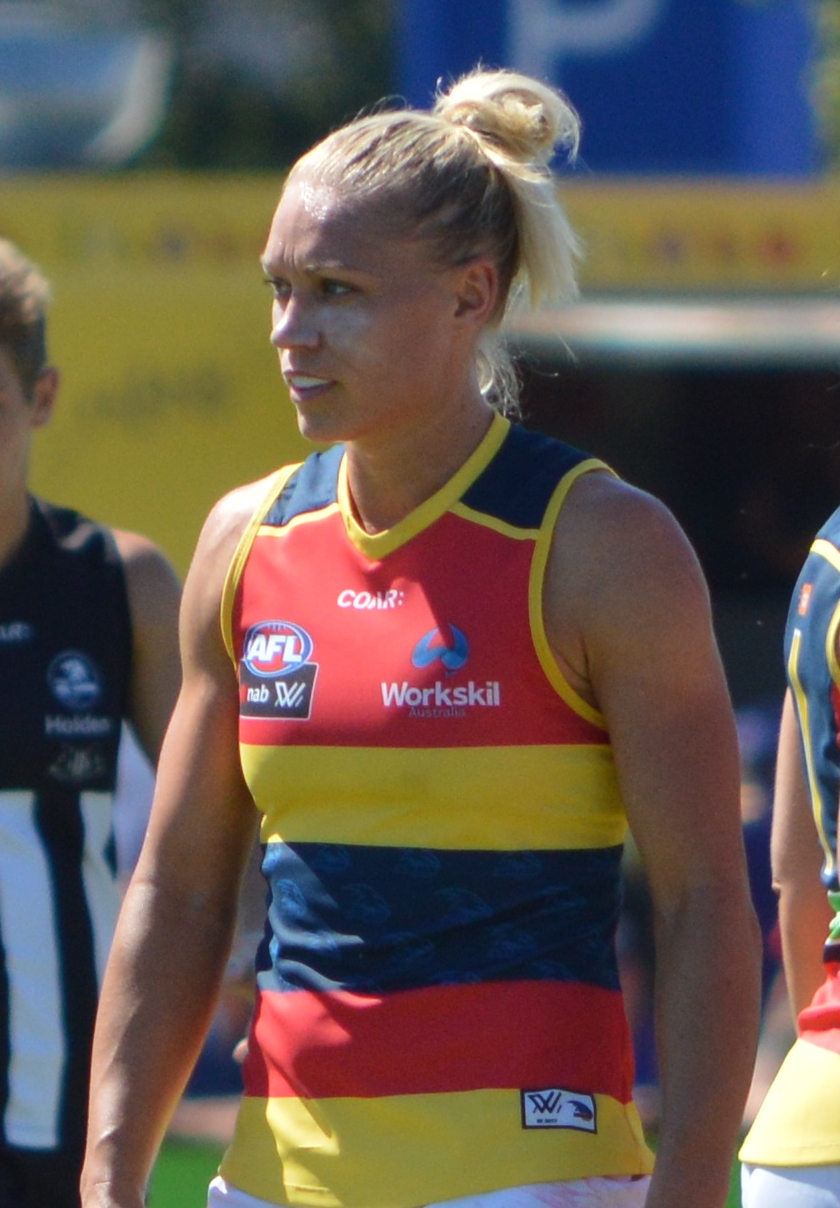
- 2017 AFL Women's best and fairest winner Erin Phillips
- Date: 28 March
- Location: Docklands Stadium
- Winner(s): Erin Phillips; Adelaide (14 votes)

The 2017 AFL Women's best and fairest was the first year the award was presented to the player adjudged the best and fairest player during the AFL Women's (AFLW) home-and-away season. Erin Phillips of the Adelaide Football Club won the award with 14 votes.

== Leading votegetters ==
Placing	Player	Votes
1st	Erin Phillips (Adelaide)	14
=2nd	Ellie Blackburn (Western Bulldogs)	10
=2nd	Karen Paxman (Melbourne)	10
4th	Lara Filocamo (Fremantle)	9
5th	Kaitlyn Ashmore (Brisbane)	8
=6th	Jessica Dal Pos (Greater Western Sydney)	7
=6th	Emma Kearney (Western Bulldogs)	7
=6th	Elise O'Dea (Melbourne)	7
=6th	Daisy Pearce (Melbourne)	7
=6th	Darcy Vescio (Carlton)	7

== Voting procedure ==
The three field umpires (the umpires who control the flow of the game, as opposed to goal or boundary umpires) confer after each match and award three votes, two votes and one vote to the players they regard as the best, second-best and third-best in the match, respectively. The votes are kept secret until the awards night, and are read and tallied on the evening.

The winner of the 2017 AFL Women's best and fairest was Erin Phillips, receiving 14 votes to win the inaugural award.
