= Brisbane best and fairest (AFL Women's) =

- Awarded for: The best and fairest player of the Brisbane Lions in the AFL Women's
- Country: Australia
- Presented by: Brisbane Lions
- First award: 2017
- Currently held by: Belle Dawes

In the AFL Women's (AFLW), the Brisbane best and fairest award is awarded to the best and fairest player at the Brisbane Lions during the home-and-away season. The award has been awarded annually since the competition's inaugural season in 2017, and Emily Bates was the inaugural winner of the award.

== Recipients ==
**Bold**	Denotes current player
	Player won AFL Women's best and fairest in same season

Season	Recipient(s)	Ref.
2017	Emily Bates	
2018	Kate Lutkins	
2019	**Ally Anderson**	
2020	Emily Bates (2)	
2021	**Ally Anderson** (2)	
2022 (S6)	Emily Bates (3)	
2022 (S7)	Emily Bates (4)	
2023	**Ally Anderson** (3)	
2024	**Ally Anderson** (4)	
2025	**Belle Dawes**	

=== Multiple winners ===
Player	Awards	Seasons
Emily Bates	4	2017, 2020, 2022 (S6), 2022 (S7)
**Ally Anderson**	4	2019, 2021, 2023, 2024

== See also ==
- Merrett–Murray Medal (list of Brisbane Lions best and fairest winners in the Australian Football League)
