= Emily Bates =

Australian rules footballer (born 1995)

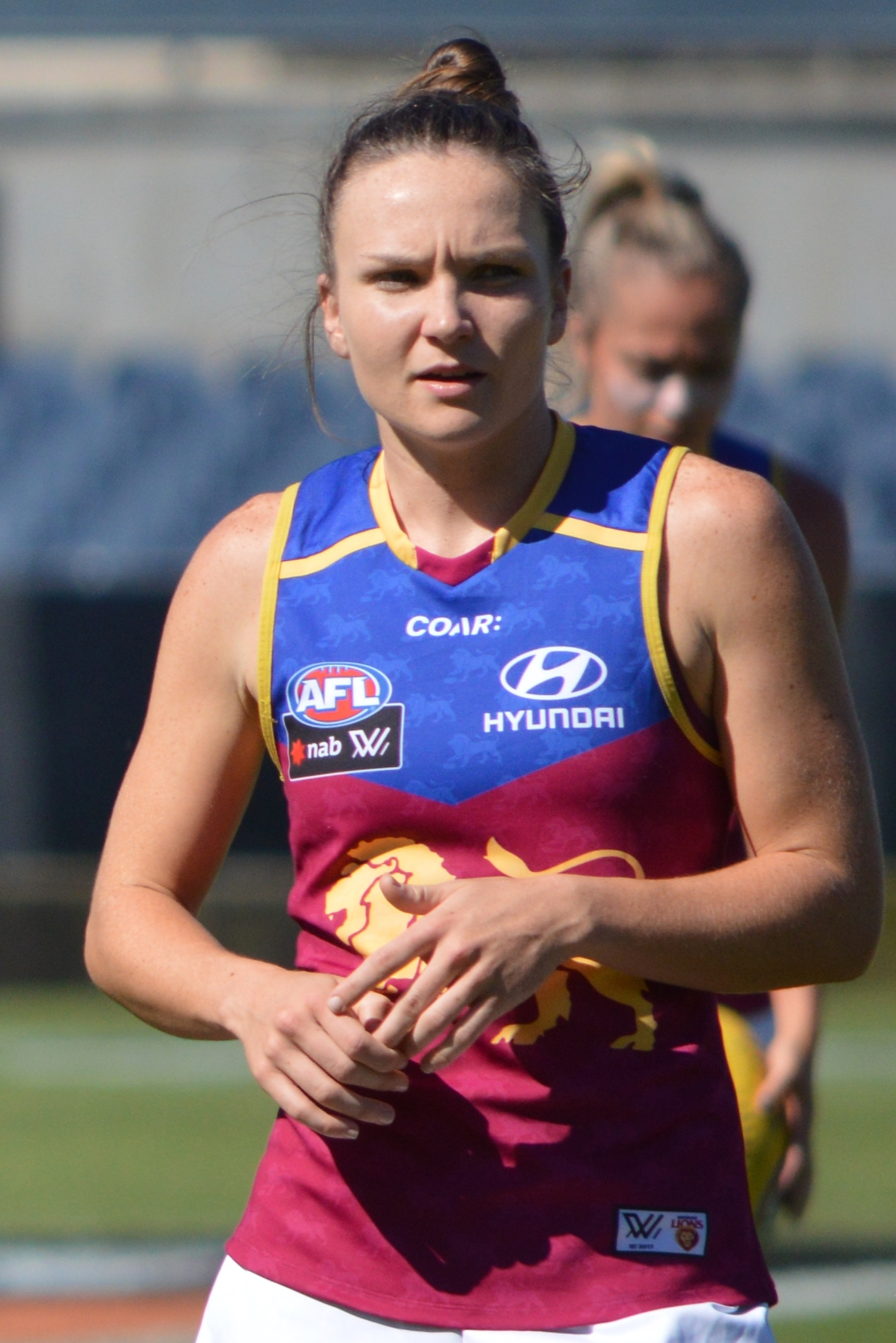
- Bates playing for Brisbane in 2017

Personal information
- Full name: Emily Bates
- Born: 18 October 1995 (age 31); Bacchus Marsh, Victoria
- Original team: Yeronga South Brisbane (QAFLW)
- Draft: No. 2, 2016 national draft
- Debut: Round 1, 2017, Brisbane vs. Melbourne, at Casey Fields
- Height: 169 cm (5 ft 7 in)
- Position: Midfielder

Club information
- Current club: Hawthorn
- Number: 1

Playing career^{1}
Years	Club	Games (Goals)
2017–2022 (S7)	Brisbane	66 (9)
2023–	Hawthorn	30 (7)
Total		96 (16)

Representative team honours^{2}
Years	Team	Games (Goals)
2017	The Allies	1 (0)
- ^{1} Playing statistics correct to the end of 2025.^{2} Representative statistics correct as of 2017.

Career highlights
- AFL Women's premiership player: 2021; Hawthorn captain: 2024–; AFL Women's best and fairest: S6; AFLPA AFLW most valuable player: S6; AFLCA AFLW champion player of the year: S6; 3× AFL Women's All-Australian team: 2017, 2018, S6; 4× Brisbane best and fairest: 2017, 2020, S6, S7; Hawthorn best and fairest: 2023

Emily Bates (born 18 October 1995) is an Australian rules footballer playing for the Hawthorn Football Club in the AFL Women's (AFLW). She previously played for the Brisbane Lions from 2017 to season 7. Bates was selected by the Western Bulldogs in the inaugural national women's draft in 2013, and represented them in the first three years of the exhibition games staged prior to the creation of the league. She represented Brisbane in 2016, the last year that the games were held, and was drafted by the club with the second selection in the 2016 AFL Women's draft prior to the inaugural AFL Women's season.

Bates won an AFL Women's premiership with Brisbane in 2021 and was awarded the league's highest individual accolade, the AFL Women's best and fairest, in season 6. She is also a three-time AFL Women's All-Australian, four-time Brisbane best and fairest winner and won the Hawthorn best and fairest award in 2023. Bates has served as Hawthorn captain since 2024.

== Early life ==
Bates was born in Bacchus Marsh, Victoria as one of three sisters. At the age of three, her family relocated to Brisbane. Her father Lloyd went on to be a key figure in Queensland football, and encouraged Bates to play football at Yeronga Football Club, where he coached. Through him she grew up with a football in her hand and when a girls' team started up in 2011, she joined as a junior with her father as team coach with the two winning the under 15 junior premiership. Lloyd passed of cardiac arrest when she was 15 and the medal awarded to the best and fairest player in Yeronga’s QAFLW team is named in his honour. She was educated at Brigidine College, Indooroopilly.

In 2011 and 2012 she represented Queensland at under-18 level in both cricket and Australian rules football (as captain), but she ultimately chose Australian rules football over a cricket career.

Bates was selected by the Western Bulldogs with the forty-fourth selection in the inaugural national women's draft in 2013, and represented them in the first three years of the exhibition games staged prior to the creation of the league.

She won the Best & Fairest in the QWAFL in 2016.

== AFL Women's career ==
Bates was taken with the number two pick, Brisbane's first, in the 2016 AFL Women's draft. She was announced as one of the "values leaders" to assist captain Emma Zielke alongside Sabrina Frederick-Traub, Leah Kaslar and Sam Virgo in January 2017. She made her debut in the Lions' inaugural game against Melbourne at Casey Fields in the opening round of the 2017 AFL Women's season.

Bates was nominated by her teammates for the 2017 AFLW Players’ Most Valuable Player Award, was named Brisbane's best and fairest and was also listed in the All-Australian team.

Brisbane signed Bates for the 2018 season during the trade period in May 2017.

Brisbane signed Bates for the 2020 season during the trade and sign period in April 2019.

Bates signed on with Brisbane for 2 more years on 15 June 2021.

In 2022 season 6, Bates elevated her game to new heights and averaged nearly 22 disposals and six tackles a game, becoming the Lions' best player. She polled 21 votes in the best and fairest count and became the club's first league best and fairest recipient, the highest individual accolade in the sport. She also earned the Coaches Association Champion Player of the Year award and the Players Association Most Valuable Player (MVP) award, which made her the second player in the competition's history to win all three individual end-of-season awards.

Leading into the 2023 season, Sarah Black named Bates at no. 10 on her annual list of the top 30 players in the AFLW.

Leading into the 2024 season, Bates was announced as Hawthorn's new captain, replacing Tilly Lucas-Rodd. Bates was named among Hawthorn's best players in its win over Carlton in week 1 but was a late withdrawal from Hawthorn's win over Collingwood in week 2, missing an AFLW match for the first time in her career. She returned against Adelaide in week 3 and was named among Hawthorn's best players.

== Statistics ==
Updated to the end of 2025.

Legend
G	Goals	K	Kicks	D	Disposals	T	Tackles
B	Behinds	H	Handballs	M	Marks
#	Played in that season's premiership team	†	Led the league for the season	±	Won that season's AFLW B&F

Season	Team	No.	Games	Totals							Averages (per game)							Votes
Season	Team	No.	Games	G	B	K	H	D	M	T	G	B	K	H	D	M	T	Votes
2017	Brisbane	1	8	1	1	84	41	125	21	38	0.1	0.1	10.5	5.1	15.6	2.6	4.8	4
2018	Brisbane	1	8	0	0	73	66^{†}	139	18	37	0.0	0.0	9.1	8.3^{†}	17.4	2.3	4.6	4
2019	Brisbane	1	7	0	1	62	54	116	15	29	0.0	0.2	8.9	7.7	16.6	2.1	4.1	1
2020	Brisbane	1	7	1	1	80	59	139	23	24	0.1	0.1	11.4	8.4	19.9	3.3	3.4	4
2021^{#}	Brisbane	1	11	1	1	96	79	175	26	43	0.1	0.1	8.7	7.2	15.9	2.4	3.9	6
2022 (S6)	Brisbane	1	12	3	2	142	114	256	25	85	0.3	0.2	11.8	9.5	21.3	2.1	7.1	21^{±}
2022 (S7)	Brisbane	1	13	3	2	131	105	236	29	85	0.2	0.2	10.1	8.1	18.2	2.2	6.5	8
2023	Hawthorn	39	10	1	3	104	104	208	18	97	0.1	0.3	10.4	10.4	20.8	1.8	9.7	5
2024	Hawthorn	1	12	5	4	126	126	252	30	85	0.4	0.3	10.5	10.5	21.0	2.5	7.1	17
2025	Hawthorn	1	8	1	1	59	113	172	12	45	0.1	0.1	7.4	14.1	21.5	1.5	5.6	10
Career			96	16	16	957	861	1818	217	568	0.2	0.2	10.0	9.0	18.9	2.3	5.9	80

== Honours and achievements ==
Team

- AFL Women's premiership player (Brisbane): 2021
- 2× AFL Women's minor premiership (Brisbane): 2017, S7
- McClelland Trophy (Hawthorn): 2024

Individual

- Hawthorn captain: 2024–present
- AFL Women's best and fairest: S6
- AFLPA AFLW most valuable player: S6
- AFLCA AFLW champion player of the year: S6
- 3× AFL Women's All-Australian team: 2017, 2018, S6
- 4× Brisbane best and fairest: 2017, 2020, S6, S7
- Hawthorn best and fairest: 2023
- Allies representative honours in AFL Women's State of Origin: 2017
