= 2022 AFL Women's best and fairest =

2022 AFL Women's best and fairest may refer to:

- 2022 AFL Women's season 6 best and fairest, for the season that took place from January to April
- 2022 AFL Women's season 7 best and fairest, for the season that took place from August to November
