= Kate McCarthy =

Australian rules footballer (born 1992)

Personal information
- Nickname: Cathy Freeman
- Born: 24 October 1992 (age 34)
- Original team: Yeronga South Brisbane (QWAFL)
- Draft: No. 82, 2016 AFL Women's draft
- Debut: Round 1, 2017, Brisbane vs. Melbourne, at Casey Fields
- Height: 164 cm (5 ft 5 in)
- Position: Midfield/small forward

Playing career^{1}
Years	Club	Games (Goals)
2017–2019	Brisbane	23 (16)
2020–2022 (S6)	St Kilda	16 (2)
2022 (S7)	Hawthorn	3 (0)
Total		42 (18)

Representative team honours^{2}
Years	Team	Games (Goals)
2017	The Allies	1 (0)
- ^{1} Playing statistics correct to the end of 2022 (S7).^{2} Representative statistics correct as of 2017.

Career highlights
- AFLW: AFL Women's All-Australian team: 2017; Brisbane leading goalkicker: 2017; QWAFL: 2017 QWAFL Best & Fairest

Kate McCarthy (born 24 October 1992) is a former Australian rules footballer, media personality and sports commentator who played for the Brisbane Lions, St Kilda Football Club, and Hawthorn Football Club in the AFL Women's (AFLW).

== Early and personal life ==
McCarthy grew up in Brisbane where she initially pursued a career in cricket and represented Queensland in the process. She later switched to play Australian rules football for Yeronga South Brisbane in the QWAFL before signing for the Brisbane Lions. She has represented Australia for touch rugby league to at least as high as the under-20s age group. As of 2017, she works as a mathematics and physical education teacher at Clairvaux MacKillop College. She has required an implanted pacemaker since the age of ten.

== AFL Women's career ==
McCarthy was taken with the number 82 pick by Brisbane in the 2016 AFL Women's draft. She made her debut in the Lions' inaugural game against Melbourne at Casey Fields in the opening round of the 2017 AFL Women's season. McCarthy is noted for her speed and ability to kick the ball accurately while sprinting.

At the end of the season, McCarthy was listed in the 2017 All-Australian team.

Brisbane signed McCarthy for the 2018 season during the trade period in May 2017.

In April 2019, McCarthy joined expansion club St Kilda, along with fellow Brisbane player Nat Exon.

In May 2022, McCarthy was delisted by St Kilda to allow her to explore her options. Following her delisting, she was signed by expansion club Hawthorn as a delisted free agent. At the conclusion of the season, on January 12th 2023 McCarthy retired from the sport after 7 seasons at the highest level.

== Post-playing career ==
In February 2026, McCarthy launched a football-focused podcast on the iHeartRadio network called AL, Kate & All Their Mates with musician and football aficionado Alex Lahey.

== Statistics ==
Legend
G	Goals	K	Kicks	D	Disposals	T	Tackles
B	Behinds	H	Handballs	M	Marks

Season	Team	No.	Games	Totals							Averages (per game)							Votes
Season	Team	No.	Games	G	B	K	H	D	M	T	G	B	K	H	D	M	T	Votes
2017	Brisbane	9	8	9	1	38	11	49	9	21	1.1	0.1	4.8	1.4	6.1	1.1	2.6	0
2018	Brisbane	9	8	1	2	37	9	46	14	13	0.1	0.3	4.6	1.1	5.8	1.8	1.6	0
2019	Brisbane	9	7	6	4	32	8	40	7	20	0.9	0.6	4.6	1.1	5.7	1.0	2.9	0
2020	St Kilda	9	4	1	0	26	10	36	6	8	0.3	0.0	6.5	2.5	9.0	1.5	2.0	0
2021	St Kilda	9	6	1	2	26	8	34	7	3	0.2	0.3	4.3	1.3	5.7	1.2	0.5	0
2022 (S6)	St Kilda	9	6	0	2	37	5	42	5	5	0.0	0.3	6.2	0.8	7.0	0.8	0.8	0
2022 (S7)	Hawthorn	9	3	0	0	11	2	13	6	6	0.0	0.0	3.7	0.7	4.3	2.0	2.0	0
Career			42	18	11	207	53	260	54	76	0.4	0.3	4.9	1.3	6.2	1.3	1.8	0

== Honours and achievements ==
Team

- AFL Women's minor premiership (Brisbane): 2017

Individual

- AFL Women's All-Australian team: 2017
- Brisbane leading goalkicker: 2017

== Media career ==
McCarthy joined the Seven Network as a media personality supporting shows including Armchair Experts for the 2024 AFL season alongside Kane Cornes and the 2024 AFL Grand Final broadcast alongside Jude Bolton.
