= Kara Antonio =

Australian rules footballer

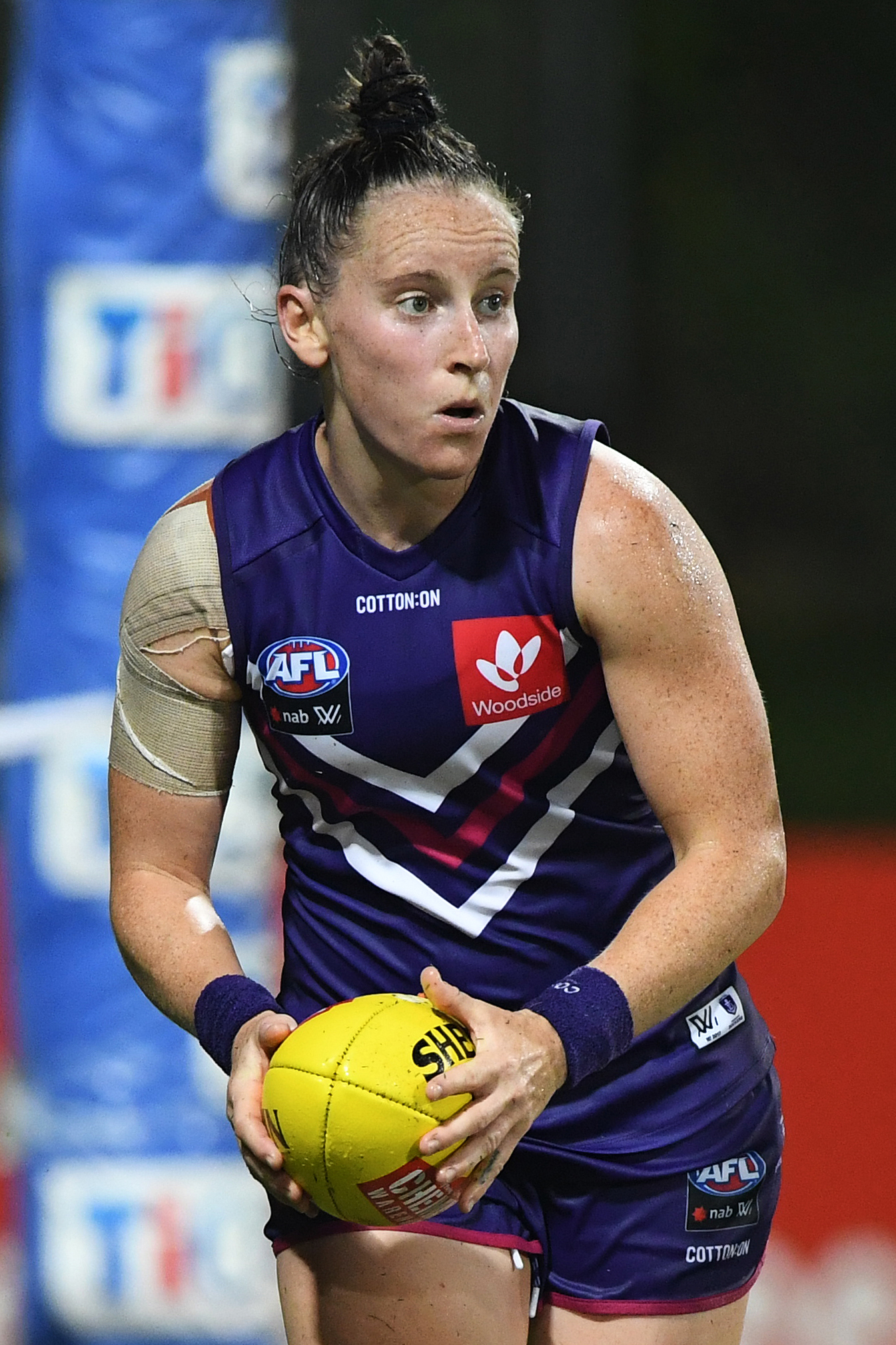
- Antonio playing for Fremantle in January 2019

Personal information
- Born: 27 February 1992 (age 34)
- Original team: Swan Districts (WAWFL)
- Draft: Marquee player, 2016: Fremantle
- Debut: Round 1, 2017, Fremantle vs. Western Bulldogs, at VU Whitten Oval
- Height: 163 cm (5 ft 4 in)
- Position: Midfielder

Club information
- Current club: Fremantle
- Number: 15

Playing career^{1}
Years	Club	Games (Goals)
2017–2022 (S7)	Fremantle	47 (16)

Representative team honours^{2}
Years	Team	Games (Goals)
2017	Victoria	1 (0)
- ^{1} Playing statistics correct to the end of the 2022 season.^{2} Representative statistics correct as of 2017.

Career highlights
- AFLW: 2017 AFL Women's All-Australian team; State: Fremantle captain: 2017–2021; Fremantle leading goalkicker: 2017

Kara Antonio (née Donnellan, born 27 February 1992) is a former Australian rules footballer who played for the Fremantle Football Club in the AFL Women's competition. She played 47 games across seven seasons for the Dockers and was their inaugural captain.

== Early life and amateur career ==
Antonio spent her early years in Victoria. She played state league football with the St Albans Women's Football Club (now VU Western Spurs) through 2012. Antonio moved to Perth prior to the 2013 season and began playing with Swan Districts in the West Australian Women's Football League. In her first season with Swan Districts, she received Best on Ground honours in their Grand Final win and won their Best and Fairest award. Antonio was made captain the following year. She would captain the Districts to three Premierships over the next four years, winning another three consecutive Best and Fairest awards during that time. After the competition was superseded by the WAFLW in 2019, Antonio was made Swan Districts' inaugural coach for their first season in the new competition.

In 2013, while still at Swan Districts, she was drafted by the Melbourne Football Club to play in the exhibition match representative side. She was selected fifth overall in the initial two-team draft. She went on to play with the side in exhibition matches through 2016. Antonio was named best on ground following the first of two exhibition matches in 2015. She also played for and represented the West Coast side in an exhibition match played in 2016.

== AFL Women's career ==
Antonio was one of two marquee player signings announced by Fremantle in anticipation of the league's inaugural 2017 season. In January 2017, she was announced as the inaugural captain of the Fremantle AFL Women's team.

Antonio was highlighted as "Player of the Week" by the AFL Players Association for her "best on ground" performance in the Dockers' first AFLW win in round 6 against Carlton. However, she tore a quadriceps in the third quarter of that match, causing her to miss the final game of the season. After six rounds, Antonio was statistically in the top two players overall and in score assists, fourth in kicks, tackles and clearances, and top ten in disposals and inside 50s.

Despite missing the final game, Antonio was nominated by her teammates for the AFL Players' Most Valuable Player Award, and was listed in the 2017 All-Australian team.

Fremantle signed Antonio for the 2018 season during the trade period in May 2017.

It was revealed Antonio signed on with the club for one year on 10 June 2021. She stepped down as captain on 16 November 2021.

Antonio retired at the conclusion of the 2022 AFL Women's season 7, having played just one game in S7 due to a hamstring injury.

== Statistics ==
Statistics are correct to the end of 2022 (S7).

Legend
G	Goals	K	Kicks	D	Disposals	T	Tackles
B	Behinds	H	Handballs	M	Marks

Season	Team	No.	Games	Totals							Averages (per game)							Votes
Season	Team	No.	Games	G	B	K	H	D	M	T	G	B	K	H	D	M	T	Votes
2017	Fremantle	15	6	4	0	78	23	101	11	40	0.7	0.0	13.0	3.8	16.8	1.8	6.7	3
2018	Fremantle	15	7	1	0	76	29	105	14	54	0.1	0.0	10.9	4.1	15.0	2.0	7.7	2
2019	Fremantle	15	7	0	3	58	17	75	7	24	0.0	0.4	8.3	2.4	10.7	1.0	3.4	5
2020	Fremantle	15	7	1	0	56	24	80	25	36	0.1	0.0	8.0	3.4	11.4	3.6	5.1	1
2021	Fremantle	15	10	2	2	74	33	107	23	34	0.2	0.2	7.4	3.3	10.7	2.3	3.4	0
2022 (S6)	Fremantle	15	9	6	3	55	29	84	10	14	0.7	0.3	6.1	3.2	9.3	3.2	1.6	0
2022 (S7)	Fremantle	15	1	2	2	6	2	8	2	0	2.0	2.0	6.0	2.0	8.0	2.0	0.0	0
Career			47	16	10	403	157	560	92	202	0.3	0.2	8.6	3.3	11.9	2.0	4.3	11

== Personal life ==
In October 2019, Kara married fellow Fremantle player Ebony Antonio and changed her surname from Donnellan to Antonio.
