= Elise O'Dea =

Australian rules footballer

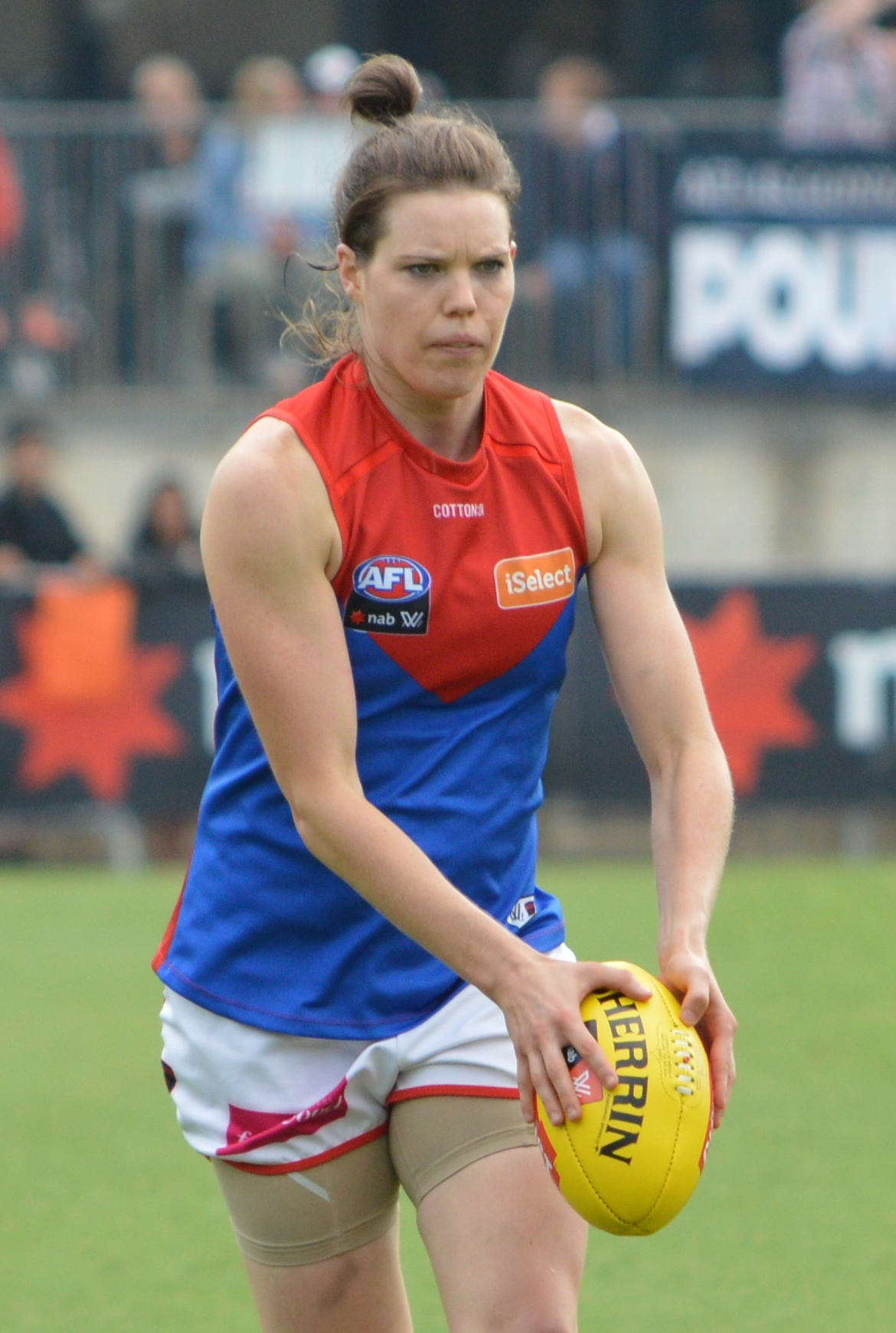
- O'Dea with Melbourne in March 2018

Personal information
- Born: 4 September 1991 (age 35); Canberra, Australian Capital Territory
- Original team: Darebin Falcons (VWFL)
- Draft: No. 8, 2016 AFL Women's draft
- Debut: Round 1, 2017, Melbourne vs. Brisbane, at Casey Fields
- Height: 172 cm (5 ft 8 in)
- Position: Midfielder

Playing career
Years	Club	Games (Goals)
2017–2020	Melbourne	28 (6)
2021–2022 (S7)	Carlton	28 (7)
Total		56 (13)

Representative team honours^{2}
Years	Team	Games (Goals)
2017	The Allies	1 (0)
- ^{2} Representative statistics correct as of 2017.

Career highlights
- Melbourne co-captain: 2019; 2× AFL Women's All-Australian team: 2017, 2018

Elise O'Dea (born 4 September 1991) is a former Australian rules footballer who played for Melbourne and Carlton in the AFL Women's (AFLW). She served as Melbourne co-captain for the 2019 season and was named in two All-Australian teams across her career.

== Early life ==
O'Dea was born in Canberra in the Australian Capital Territory (ACT) to a family of Melbourne Football Club supporters and started playing football at fourteen years of age when she joined the Belconnen Magpies Football Club women's team. She made her senior debut in round one of the 2006 season against Ainslie in the AFL Canberra Women's competition. She was selected as part of the ACT representative teams in 2006, 2007, 2009, and 2011. O'Dea was also named part of the 2011 All-Australian women's team, and won both her club and league's best and fairest awards in 2012.

== Football career ==
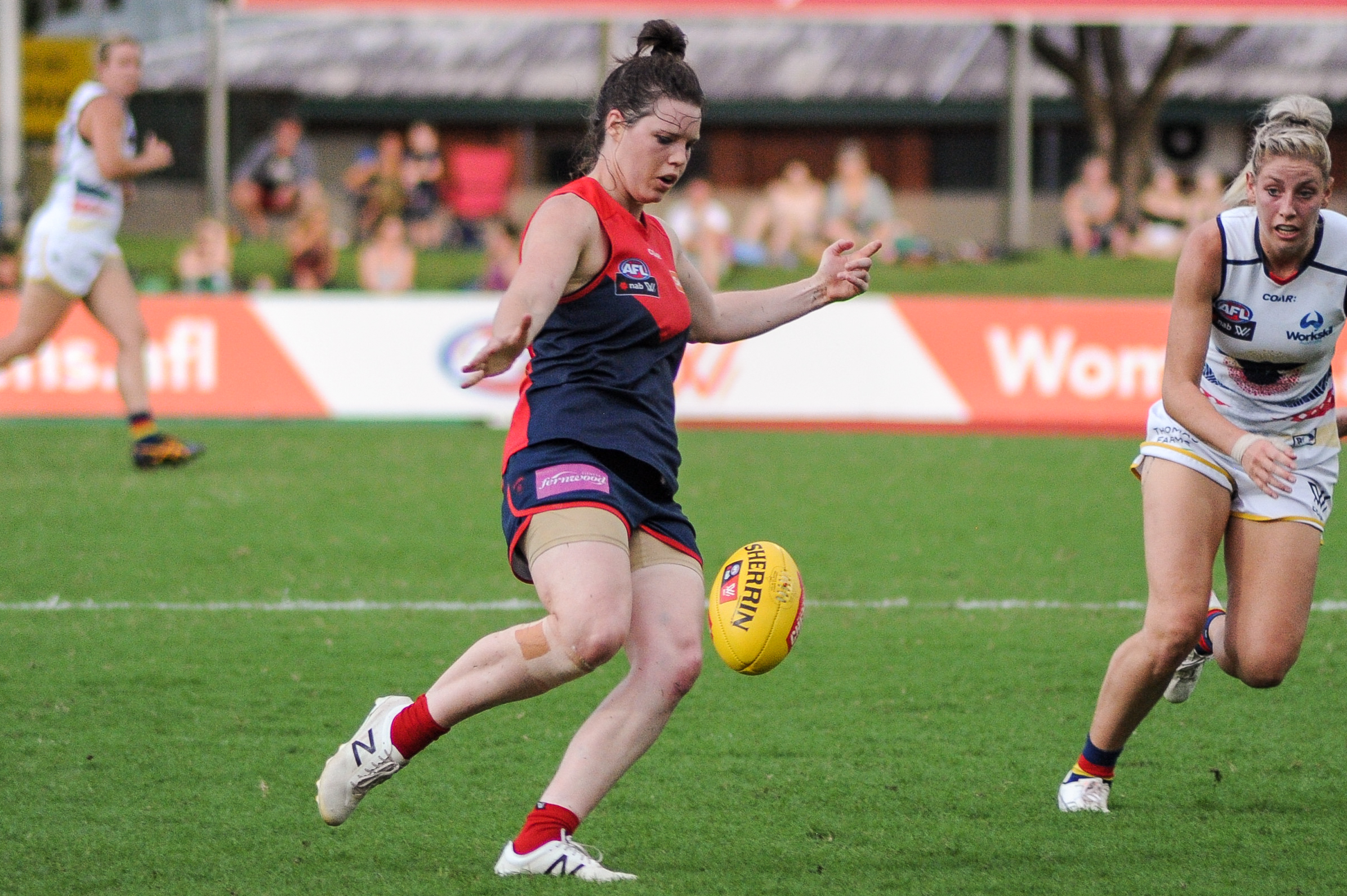
O'Dea kicking the ball during the round 6, 2017 match against Adelaide.

O'Dea moved to Victoria in 2013 to join the Darebin Falcons. Wearing number 30 and playing on the wing and half forward flank, was named as part of the Victorian state teams in 2013 and 2014, and was selected to play for both the Melbourne Football Club and Western Bulldogs as part of a series of women's exhibition games.

=== AFL Women's ===
In 2016, O'Dea became the first player drafted by the Melbourne Football Club in the first AFLW draft and wore the number five guernsey in her debut season. Prior to the start of the season, she was announced as one of two vice-captains for Melbourne, alongside Melissa Hickey. She made her debut during round 1 of the 2017 season against Brisbane at Casey Fields. In the round four match against Carlton, she collected twenty-seven disposals.

At the end of the 2017 season, O'Dea was nominated by her teammates for the AFL Players' Most Valuable Player Award. She was also listed in the 2017 All-Australian team.

Melbourne signed O'Dea for the 2018 season during the trade period in May 2017.

In December 2018, O'Dea and Shelley Scott were announced as Melbourne co-captains.

Following the conclusion of the 2020 season both O'Dea and fellow Demon Maddy Guerin were traded to the Carlton Football Club in exchange for Pick 15 in the 2020 NAB AFLW Draft.

After three seasons and 28 games for Carlton, she announced her retirement in March 2023.

== Statistics ==
Legend
G	Goals	K	Kicks	D	Disposals	T	Tackles
B	Behinds	H	Handballs	M	Marks

Season	Team	No.	Games	Totals							Averages (per game)							Votes
Season	Team	No.	Games	G	B	K	H	D	M	T	G	B	K	H	D	M	T	Votes
2017	Melbourne	5	7	1	1	82	53	135	20	32	0.1	0.1	11.7	7.6	19.3	2.9	4.6	7
2018	Melbourne	5	7	4	2	89	34	123	26	39	0.6	0.3	12.7	4.9	17.6	3.7	5.6	2
2019	Melbourne	5	7	1	0	78	51	129	26	29	0.1	0.0	11.1	7.3	18.4	3.7	4.1	4
2020	Melbourne	5	7	0	1	66	34	100	13	27	0.0	0.1	9.4	4.9	14.3	1.9	3.9	3
2021	Carlton	46	9	3	2	67	55	122	20	30	0.3	0.2	7.4	6.1	13.6	2.2	3.3	0
2022 (S6)	Carlton	46	10	1	0	70	43	113	17	24	0.1	0.0	7.0	4.3	11.3	1.7	2.4	0
2022 (S7)	Carlton	46	9	3	1	63	23	86	18	38	0.3	0.1	7.0	2.6	9.6	2.0	4.2	0
Career			56	13	7	515	293	808	140	219	0.2	0.1	9.2	5.2	14.4	2.5	3.9	16

== Personal life ==
Outside football, O'Dea works as an accountant.
