= Emma King (footballer) =

Australian rules footballer (born 1994)

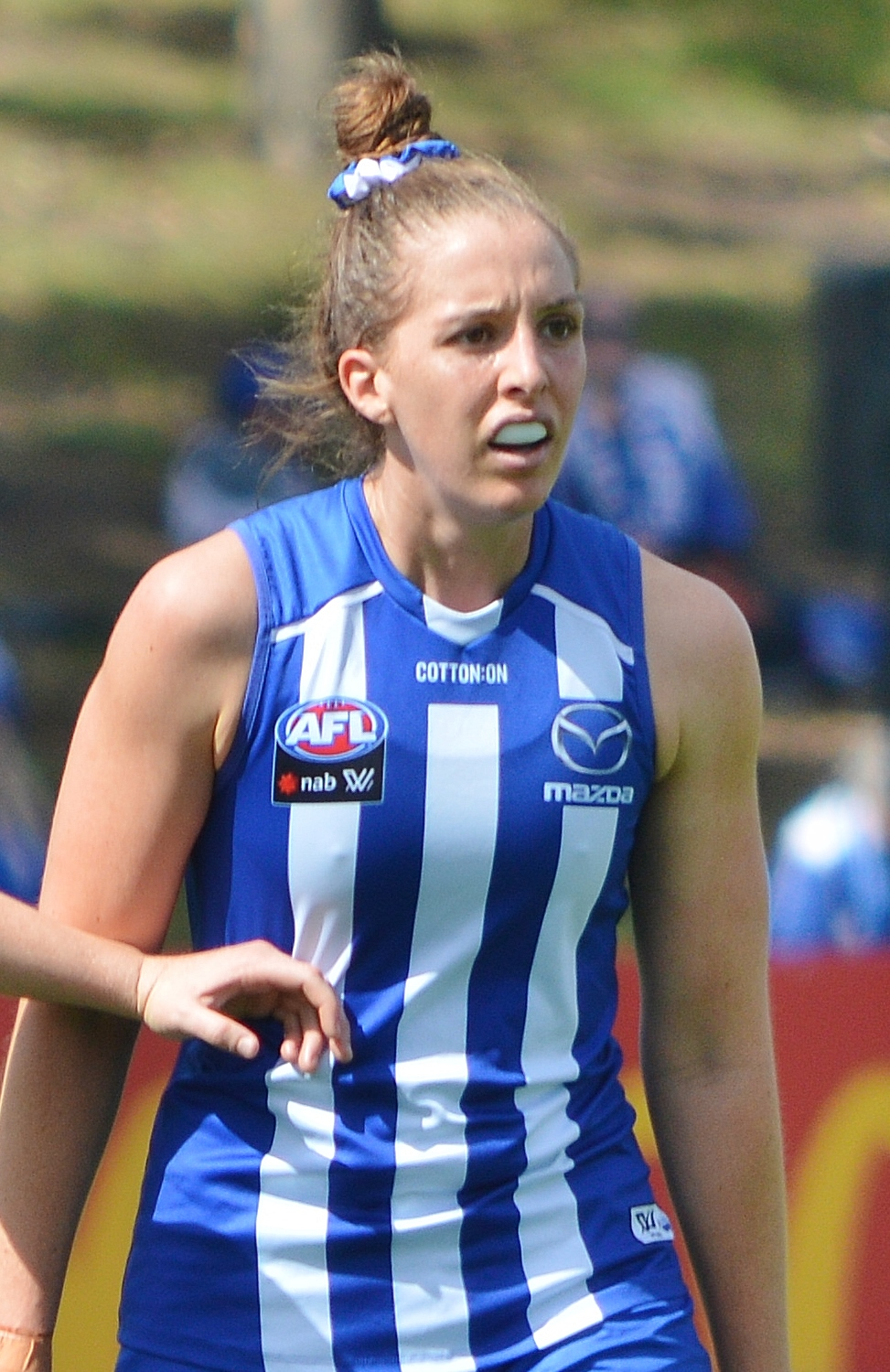
- King with North Melbourne in March 2021

Personal information
- Born: 28 June 1994 (age 32)
- Original team: Coastal Titans (WAWFL)
- Draft: Marquee player 2016: Collingwood
- Debut: Round 1, 2017, Collingwood vs. Carlton, at IKON Park
- Height: 187 cm (6 ft 2 in)
- Position: Ruck

Club information
- Current club: North Melbourne
- Number: 60

Playing career^{1}
Years	Club	Games (Goals)
2017–2018	Collingwood	14 (1)
2019–	North Melbourne	83 (53)
Total		97 (54)

Representative team honours^{2}
Years	Team	Games (Goals)
2017	The Allies	1 (0)
- ^{1} Playing statistics correct to the end of the 2025 season.^{2} Representative statistics correct as of 2017.

Career highlights
- 2x AFLW premiership player: 2024, 2025; 2× AFL Women's All-Australian team: (2017, 2019); North Melbourne leading goalkicker: 2019

Emma King (born 28 June 1994) is an Australian rules footballer playing for the North Melbourne Football Club in the AFL Women's (AFLW) competition.

== Early life and state league football ==
King began playing competitive football at the age of eight. In her junior years she would play for Quinns Districts Football Club in Perth, before moving on to play in Western Australia's youth girls competition at the age of fourteen.

King plays state league football with the Coastal Titans in the West Australian Women's Football League. She was a member of the club's 2015 premiership team. As part of her AFLW contract she is required to return to the club at the conclusion of the national league season.

In 2015, King was selected as the first overall pick in the women's AFL exhibition series draft by the Western Bulldogs. She played with the club's representative team again in 2016 as part of the women's all-star match.

King is also a two-time Western Australian state representative.

== AFL Women's career ==
=== Collingwood ===
In July 2016, King was signed by Collingwood as one of two marquee players ahead of the AFL Women's inaugural season. She made her league debut in round 1, 2017, in the club and the league's inaugural match at Ikon Park against Carlton. In round 2, she recorded a league best thirty-three hit-outs. She was praised in the media for her match by Collingwood coach Wayne Siekman.

At the end of the season, King was listed in the 2017 All-Australian team. On 19 May 2017, King was signed by Collingwood for the 2018 AFLW season.

=== North Melbourne ===
After two seasons at Collingwood, King joined North Melbourne, who entered the AFLW competition in 2019. It was revealed she signed on with the club for two more seasons on 17 June 2021, tying her to the club until the end of 2023. King achieved selection in Champion Data's 2021 AFLW All-Star stats team, after leading the league for the best hitout-to-advantage to rate, with a rate of 24.1 percent.

== Statistics ==
Statistics are correct to the end of the 2024 season

Legend
G	Goals	K	Kicks	D	Disposals	T	Tackles
B	Behinds	H	Handballs	M	Marks	H/O	Hit-outs

Season	Team	No.	Games	Totals								Averages (per game)								Votes
Season	Team	No.	Games	G	B	K	H	D	M	T	H/O	G	B	K	H	D	M	T	H/O	Votes
2017	Collingwood	60	7	0	1	28	14	42	7	8	199^{§}	0.0	0.1	4.0	2.0	6.0	1.0	1.1	28.4^{§}	3
2018	Collingwood	60	7	1	2	49	7	56	15	14	125	0.1	0.3	7.0	1.0	8.0	2.1	2.0	17.9	0
2019	North Melbourne	60	7	8	5	34	14	48	15	23	125	1.1	0.7	4.9	2.0	6.9	2.1	3.3	17.9	7
2020	North Melbourne	60	7	4	3	27	16	43	10	25	66	0.6	0.4	3.9	2.3	6.1	1.4	3.6	9.4	0
2021	North Melbourne	60	10	6	4	41	27	68	22	20	194^{‡}	0.6	0.4	4.1	2.7	6.8	2.2	2.0	19.4	4
2022 (S6)	North Melbourne	60	10	2	7	60	30	90	29	29	113	0.2	0.7	6.0	3.0	9.0	2.9	2.9	11.3	
2022 (S7)	North Melbourne	60	13	10	2	64	33	97	23	35	160	0.8	0.2	4.9	2.5	7.5	1.8	2.7	12.3	
2023	North Melbourne	60	13	8	2	79	32	111	33	58	198	0.6	0.2	6.1	2.5	8.5	2.5	4.5	15.2	
2023	North Melbourne	60	15	7	5	78	40	118	35	58	233	0.5	0.4	5.6	2.9	8.4	2.5	4.1	16.6	
Career			88	46	31	460	216	673	189	270	1413	0.5	0.4	5.2	2.4	7.6	2.1	3.1	16.1	14

== Personal life ==
Outside of football King has a university degree in architecture. She is also a member of the AFL Players Association women's advisory committee.

She has a twin sister and together they are one of two sets of twins in the same family.
