= Tim Schmidt =

Australian rules footballer (born 1986)

Personal information
- Born: 14 March 1986 (age 40)
- Original team: West Adelaide (SANFL)
- Debut: 29 July 2006, Sydney Swans vs. Port Adelaide, at AAMI Stadium
- Height: 180 cm (5 ft 11 in)
- Weight: 84 kg (185 lb)

Playing career^{1}
Years	Club	Games (Goals)
2004–2009	Sydney	17 (12)

Coaching career^{3}
Years	Club	Games (W–L–D)
2017	Greater Western Sydney (W)	7 (1–5–1)
- ^{1} Playing statistics correct to the end of 2009.^{3} Coaching statistics correct as of 2017.

Tim Schmidt (born 14 March 1986) is a former Australian rules footballer who played for the Sydney Swans in the Australian Football League.

Originally from South Australian National Football League club West Adelaide, Schmidt was drafted by Sydney with pick number 29 at the 2003 AFL draft and made his debut on 29 July 2006 against Port Adelaide at AAMI Stadium in Adelaide.

Schmidt suffered a succession of injuries while at Sydney and announced his retirement at the end of the 2009 AFL season.

In July 2016, Schmidt was appointed head coach of the Greater Western Sydney Giants women's team. The team finished in last place in the inaugural season of AFL Women's in 2017, winning the wooden spoon. He stepped down from the role in July 2017.

Schmidt has since started a kicking and skills academy called Kicking Dynamics, coaching future stars.

== Coaching statistics ==
Statistics are correct to the end of the 2017 season

Legend
W	Wins	L	Losses	D	Draws	W%	Winning percentage	LP	Ladder position	LT	League teams

Season	Team	Games	W	L	D	W %	LP	LT
2017	Greater Western Sydney	7	1	5	1	14.3%	8	8
Career totals		7	1	5	1	14.3%		
