= 2017 AFL Women's season =

Inaugural season of the AFL Women's (AFLW) competition

Overview
- Date: 3 February – 25 March 2017
- Teams: 8
- Premiers: Adelaide; 1st premiership
- Runners-up: Brisbane; 1st runners-up result
- Minor premiers: Brisbane; 1st minor premiership
- Best and fairest: Erin Phillips (Adelaide); 14 votes
- Leading goalkicker: Darcy Vescio (Carlton); 14 goals

Attendance
- Matches played: 29
- Total attendance: 198,020 (6,828 per match)
- Highest: 24,568 (round 1, Carlton v Collingwood)

The 2017 AFL Women's season was the inaugural season of the AFL Women's (AFLW) competition, the highest-level senior women's Australian rules football competition in Australia. The season ran from 3 February to 25 March, comprising a seven-round home-and-away season followed by a grand final contested by the top two clubs. Eight Australian Football League (AFL) clubs featured in the inaugural season: Adelaide, Brisbane, Carlton, Collingwood, Fremantle, Greater Western Sydney, Melbourne and the Western Bulldogs.

Adelaide won the inaugural premiership, defeating Brisbane by six points in the 2017 AFL Women's Grand Final. Brisbane won the minor premiership by finishing atop the home-and-away ladder with a 6–0–1 win–loss–draw record. Adelaide's Erin Phillips won the AFL Women's best and fairest award as the league's best and fairest player, and Carlton's Darcy Vescio won the AFL Women's leading goalkicker award as the league's leading goalkicker.

== Home-and-away season ==
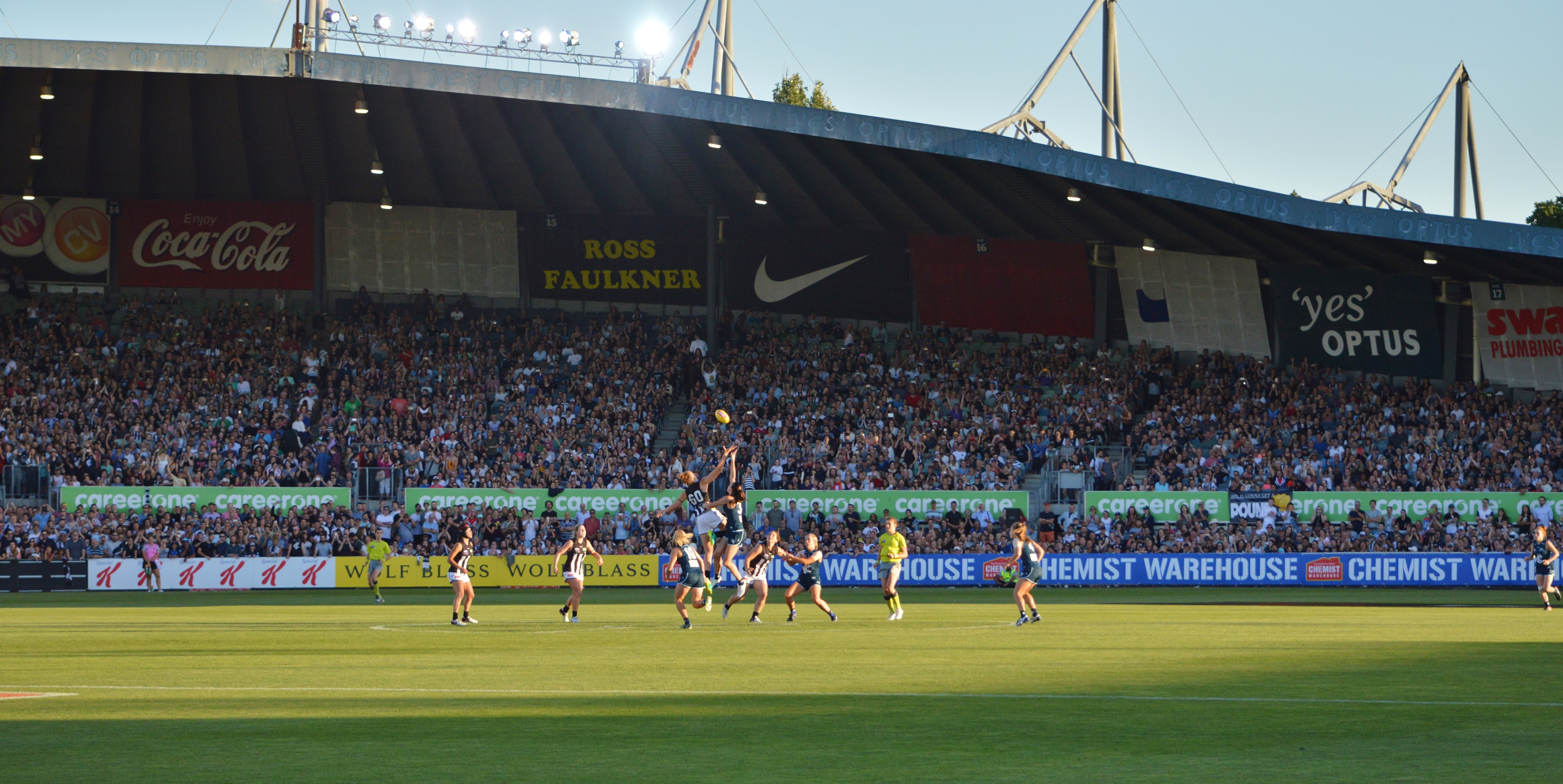
Players contest the first ball-up at the inaugural AFLW match.

The full fixture was released on Friday 9 December 2016. Notable features of the draw include:

- Carlton and Collingwood featured in the league's first ever match, the match was initially scheduled to be held at Collingwood's home Olympic Park Oval, but was moved in January 2017 to the higher capacity Ikon Park due to higher than expected interest.
- Adelaide, Carlton, Fremantle and the Western Bulldogs each had four home games, while all other clubs had three.
- Adelaide, Greater Western Sydney and Fremantle each hosted matches at grounds outside of their home metropolitan area with trips to Darwin, Canberra and Mandurah respectively. Fremantle played their home game against Carlton at Domain Stadium, the home ground of the men's team, as part of a double-header which also included an AFL pre-season match between the same two clubs.
- The Western Bulldogs featured in the most free-to-air televised matches (four), Collingwood and Melbourne had three each, Adelaide had two and all other clubs had only one.
- Many games were played in the late morning and late afternoon to avoid the summer heat, especially in Brisbane and Western Australia.
- All starting times are local.

=== Round 1 ===
	Round 1
Friday, 3 February (7:45 pm)	Carlton 7.4 (46)	def.	Collingwood 1.5 (11)	Ikon Park (crowd: 24,568)	Report
Saturday, 4 February (4:35 pm)	Adelaide 7.6 (48)	def.	Greater Western Sydney 1.6 (12)	Thebarton Oval (crowd: 9,289)	Report
Saturday, 4 February (7:35 pm)	Western Bulldogs 6.8 (44)	def.	Fremantle 1.6 (12)	VU Whitten Oval (crowd: 10,100)	Report
Sunday, 5 February (5:05 pm)	Melbourne 1.4 (10)	def. by	Brisbane 4.1 (25)	Casey Fields (crowd: 6,500)	Report
A lockout was declared during the first quarter of the Carlton and Collingwood match, with the Victorian Police requesting the gates to be closed for safety reasons. The crowd of 24,568 set an all-time record for attendance at a stand-alone women's sports event in Australia, exceeded only by the Olympic Games and Commonwealth Games for crowds at women's sports.

=== Round 2 ===
	Round 2
Friday, 10 February (7:35 pm)	Western Bulldogs 2.11 (23)	def. by	Adelaide 7.6 (48)	VU Whitten Oval (crowd: 7,669)	Report
Saturday, 11 February (3:35 pm)	Carlton 7.5 (47)	def.	Greater Western Sydney 5.4 (34)	Ikon Park (crowd: 7,884)	Report
Saturday, 11 February (7:40 pm)	Collingwood 4.1 (25)	def. by	Melbourne 7.2 (44)	Ikon Park (crowd: 6,916)	Report
Sunday, 12 February (4:05 pm)	Fremantle 3.5 (23)	def. by	Brisbane 5.6 (36)	Fremantle Oval (crowd: 10,000)	Report
Due to higher than expected attendances in the first round, the match between Collingwood and Melbourne was moved from Olympic Park Oval to Ikon Park.

=== Round 3 ===
	Round 3
Saturday, 18 February (12:05 pm)	Greater Western Sydney 7.1 (43)	drew with	Fremantle 6.7 (43)	Blacktown ISP Oval (crowd: 4,000)	Report
Saturday, 18 February (3:35 pm)	Brisbane 4.3 (27)	def.	Collingwood 3.5 (23)	South Pine Sports Complex (crowd: 5,500)	Report
Saturday, 18 February (7:35 pm)	Western Bulldogs 4.5 (29)	def. by	Melbourne 6.7 (43)	VU Whitten Oval (crowd: 8,000)	Report
Sunday, 19 February (11:35 am)	Adelaide 2.5 (17)	def.	Carlton 2.2 (14)	Thebarton Oval (crowd: 9,006)	Report
Greater Western Sydney's draw with Fremantle was the first draw in AFL Women's history.

=== Round 4 ===
	Round 4
Saturday, 25 February (11:35 am)	Melbourne 6.6 (42)	def.	Carlton 5.6 (36)	Casey Fields (crowd: 3,965)	Report
Saturday, 25 February (3:35 pm)	Brisbane 6.7 (43)	def.	Greater Western Sydney 1.3 (9)	South Pine Sports Complex (crowd: 3,500)	Report
Saturday, 25 February (7:10 pm)	Western Bulldogs 3.7 (25)	def. by	Collingwood 5.2 (32)	VU Whitten Oval (crowd: 6,733)	Report
Sunday, 26 February (4:05 pm)	Fremantle 3.5 (23)	def. by	Adelaide 6.10 (46)	Fremantle Oval (crowd: 4,578)	Report

=== Round 5 ===
	Round 5
Friday, 3 March (5:05 pm)	Greater Western Sydney 3.2 (20)	def.	Melbourne 1.9 (15)	Blacktown ISP Oval (crowd: 2,000)	Report
Saturday, 4 March (11:35 am)	Carlton 8.6 (54)	def.	Western Bulldogs 7.6 (48)	Ikon Park (crowd: 6,833)	Report
Saturday, 4 March (10:35 am)	Fremantle 4.7 (31)	def. by	Collingwood 5.2 (32)	Rushton Park (crowd: 2,800)	Report
Saturday, 4 March (6:40 pm)	Adelaide 4.6 (30)	def. by	Brisbane 5.3 (33)	Norwood Oval (crowd: 12,108)	Report

=== Round 6 ===
	Round 6
Friday, 10 March (3:05 pm)	Fremantle 6.7 (43)	def.	Carlton 4.3 (27)	Domain Stadium (crowd: 1,200)	Report
Saturday, 11 March (10:05 am)	Brisbane 2.11 (23)	def.	Western Bulldogs 2.4 (16)	South Pine Sports Complex (crowd: 4,200)	Report
Saturday, 11 March (5:40 pm)	Adelaide 5.2 (32)	def. by	Melbourne 5.4 (34)	TIO Stadium (crowd: 5,100)	Report
Sunday, 12 March (11:05 am)	Collingwood 7.13 (55)	def.	Greater Western Sydney 3.1 (19)	Olympic Park Oval (crowd: 2,700)	Report

=== Round 7 ===
	Round 7
Saturday, 18 March (4:35 pm)	Melbourne 11.4 (70)	def.	Fremantle 2.4 (16)	Casey Fields (crowd: 2,500)	Report
Saturday, 18 March (7:10 pm)	Greater Western Sydney 3.2 (20)	def. by	Western Bulldogs 7.10 (52)	Manuka Oval (crowd: 6,460)	Report
Sunday, 19 March (1:35 pm)	Collingwood 7.4 (46)	def. by	Adelaide 10.10 (70)	Olympic Park Oval (crowd: 2,500)	Report
Sunday, 19 March (3:35 pm)	Carlton 6.1 (37)	drew with	Brisbane 5.7 (37)	Ikon Park (crowd: 5,801)	Report

== Ladder ==
Pos	Team	Pld	W	L	D	PF	PA	PP	Pts	Qualification
1	Brisbane	7	6	0	1	224	148	151.4	26	Grand Final
2	Adelaide (P)	7	5	2	0	291	185	157.3	20	Grand Final
3	Melbourne	7	5	2	0	258	183	141.0	20	
4	Carlton	7	3	3	1	261	232	112.5	14	
5	Collingwood	7	3	4	0	224	262	85.5	12	
6	Western Bulldogs	7	2	5	0	237	232	102.2	8	
7	Fremantle	7	1	5	1	191	298	64.1	6	
8	Greater Western Sydney	7	1	5	1	157	303	51.8	6	

Source: AFL.com.au
Rules for classification: 1) points; 2) percentage; 3) number of points for.
(P) Premiers

== Progression by round ==
- Numbers highlighted in green indicates the team finished the round inside the top 2.
- Numbers highlighted in blue indicates the team finished in first place on the ladder in that round.
- Numbers highlighted in red indicates the team finished in last place on the ladder in that round.

	Team	1	2	3	4	5	6	7
1	Brisbane	4	8	12	16	20	24	26
2	Adelaide	4	8	12	16	16	16	20
3	Melbourne	0	4	8	12	12	16	20
4	Carlton	4	8	8	8	12	12	14
5	Collingwood	0	0	0	4	8	12	12
6	Western Bulldogs	4	4	4	4	4	4	8
7	Fremantle	0	0	2	2	2	6	6
8	Greater Western Sydney	0	0	2	2	6	6	6

== Grand final ==
In the absence of a finals series, the two teams who finished the highest on the ladder at the end of the home and away season played in the AFL Women's Grand Final. Brisbane finished as the minor premiers and secured a spot in the grand final at the end of round six; Adelaide's round seven win over Collingwood saw them secure the second spot in the grand final over Melbourne due to a higher percentage. It was confirmed in February by AFL Chief Executive Officer, Gillon McLachlan, that the team finishing highest on the ladder at the end of the season would earn the right to host the grand final in their home state. The match was originally planned to be held at the Gabba, however due to its ground surface being in a dangerous state, the grand final was moved to Metricon Stadium on the Gold Coast as a curtain raiser to the Gold Coast versus Brisbane Lions AFL match.

	2017 AFL Women's Grand Final
Saturday, 25 March (12:55 pm)	Brisbane 4.5 (29)	def. by	Adelaide 4.11 (35)	Metricon Stadium (crowd: 15,610)	Report

== Win–loss table ==
+	Win	Qualified for finals
−	Loss	Eliminated

Team	1	2	3	4	5	6	7	GF	Ladder
Adelaide	GWS; 36	WB; 25	Car; 3	Fre; 23	BL; 3	Mel; 2	Col; 24	BL; 6	1
Brisbane	Mel; 15	Fre; 13	Col; 4	GWS; 34	Ade; 3	WB; 7	Car; 0	Ade; 6	2
Carlton	Col; 35	GWS; 13	Ade; 3	Mel; 6	WB; 6	Fre; 16	BL; 0	X	4
Collingwood	Car; 35	Mel; 19	BL; 4	WB; 7	Fre; 1	GWS; 36	Ade; 24	X	5
Fremantle	WB; 32	BL; 13	GWS; 0	Ade; 23	Col; 1	Car; 16	Mel; 54	X	7
Greater Western Sydney	Ade; 36	Car; 13	Fre; 0	BL; 34	Mel; 5	Col; 36	WB; 32	X	8
Melbourne	BL; 15	Col; 19	WB; 14	Car; 6	GWS; 5	Ade; 2	Fre; 54	X	3
Western Bulldogs	Fre; 32	Ade; 25	Mel; 14	Col; 7	Car; 6	BL; 7	GWS; 32	X	6

== Attendances ==
=== By club ===
2017 AFL Women's attendances
Club	All games			Home games		
Club	Total	Games	Avg.	Total	Games	Avg.
Adelaide	65,860	8	8,233	35,503	4	8,876
Brisbane	63,219	8	7,902	28,810	4	7,203
Carlton	59,257	7	8,465	45,086	4	11,272
Collingwood	51,717	7	7,388	12,116	3	4,039
Fremantle	35,178	7	5,025	18,578	4	4,645
Greater Western Sydney	35,833	7	5,119	12,460	3	4,153
Melbourne	34,981	7	4,997	12,965	3	4,322
Western Bulldogs	49,995	7	7,142	32,502	4	8,126

=== By ground ===
2017 ground attendances
Ground	Total	Games	Avg.
Blacktown ISP Oval	6,000	2	3,000
Casey Fields	12,965	3	4,322
Domain Stadium	1,200	1	1,200
Fremantle Oval	14,578	2	7,289
IKON Park	52,002	5	10,400
Manuka Oval	6,460	1	6,460
Metricon Stadium	15,610	1	15,610
Norwood Oval	12,108	1	12,108
Olympic Park Oval	5,200	2	2,600
Rushton Park	2,800	1	2,800
South Pine Sports Complex	13,200	3	4,400
Thebarton Oval	18,295	2	9,148
TIO Stadium	5,100	1	5,100
VU Whitten Oval	32,502	4	8,126

== Coach changes ==
Club	Outgoing coach	Manner of departure	Date of vacancy	Incoming coach	Date of appointment
Brisbane	Inaugural coach			Craig Starcevich	22 June 2016
Carlton	Inaugural coach			Damien Keeping	29 June 2016
Fremantle	Inaugural coach			Michelle Cowan	1 July 2016
Greater Western Sydney	Inaugural coach			Tim Schmidt	23 July 2016
Collingwood	Inaugural coach			Wayne Siekman	26 July 2016
Western Bulldogs	Inaugural coach			Paul Groves	23 August 2016
Adelaide	Inaugural coach			Bec Goddard	24 August 2016
Melbourne	Inaugural coach			Mick Stinear	15 September 2016
Greater Western Sydney	Tim Schmidt	Resigned	21 July 2017	Alan McConnell	21 July 2017

== Club leadership ==
Table of club coaches, captains and vice-captains
Club	Coach	Captain(s)	Vice-captain(s)	Ref.
Adelaide	Bec Goddard	Erin Phillips, Chelsea Randall	Ange Foley, Sally Riley	
Brisbane	Craig Starcevich	Emma Zielke	—N/a	
Carlton	Damien Keeping	Lauren Arnell	Brianna Davey, Madeline Keryk	
Collingwood	Wayne Siekman	Steph Chiocci	Alicia Eva	
Fremantle	Michelle Cowan	Kara Donnellan	Kirby Bentley, Kiara Bowers	
Greater Western Sydney	Tim Schmidt	Amanda Farrugia	Emma Swanson	
Melbourne	Mick Stinear	Daisy Pearce	Melissa Hickey, Elise O'Dea	
Western Bulldogs	Paul Groves	Katie Brennan	Ellie Blackburn	

== Honours ==
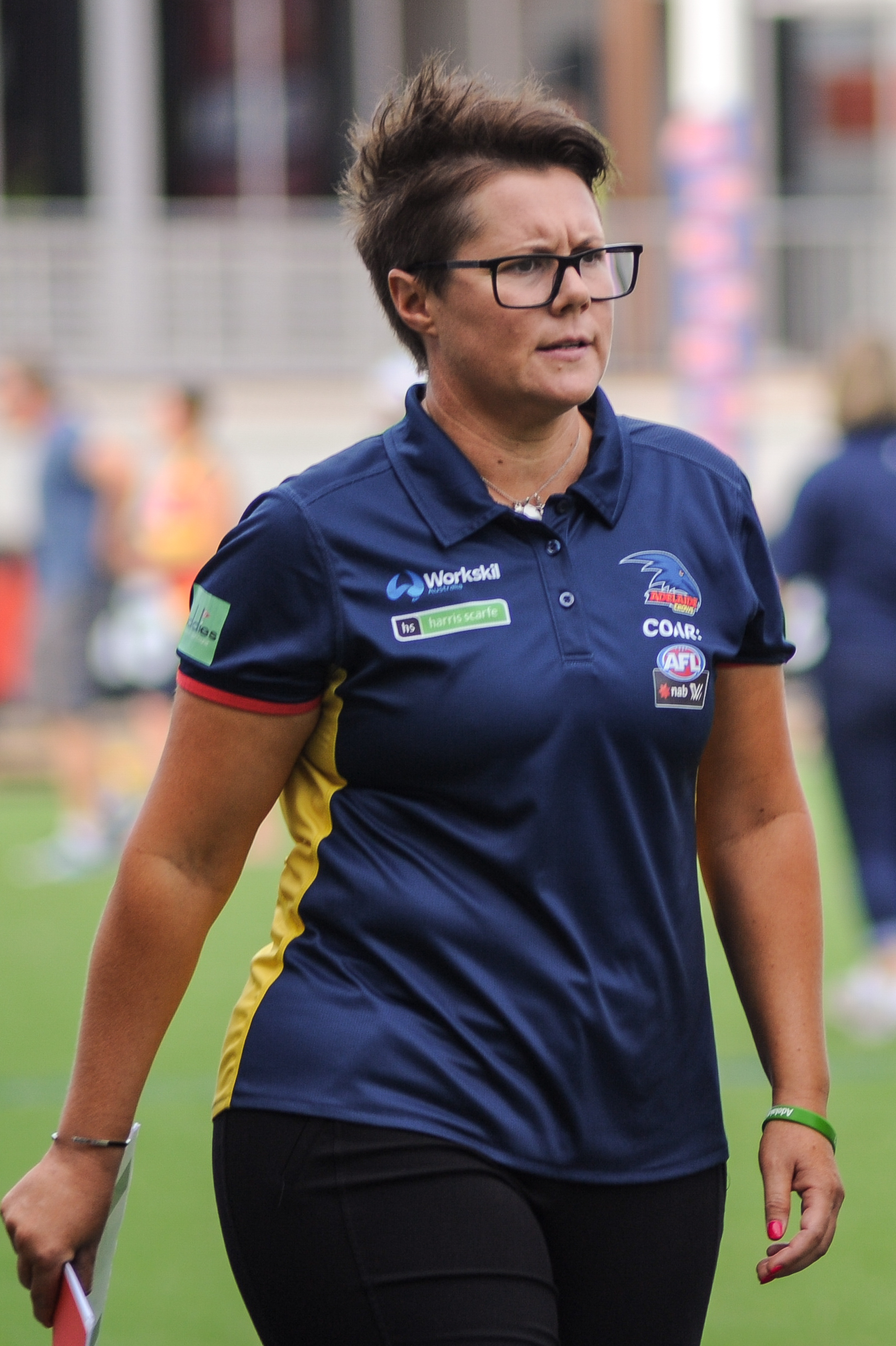
Bec Goddard coached Adelaide in 2017, winning the inaugural AFLW premiership.

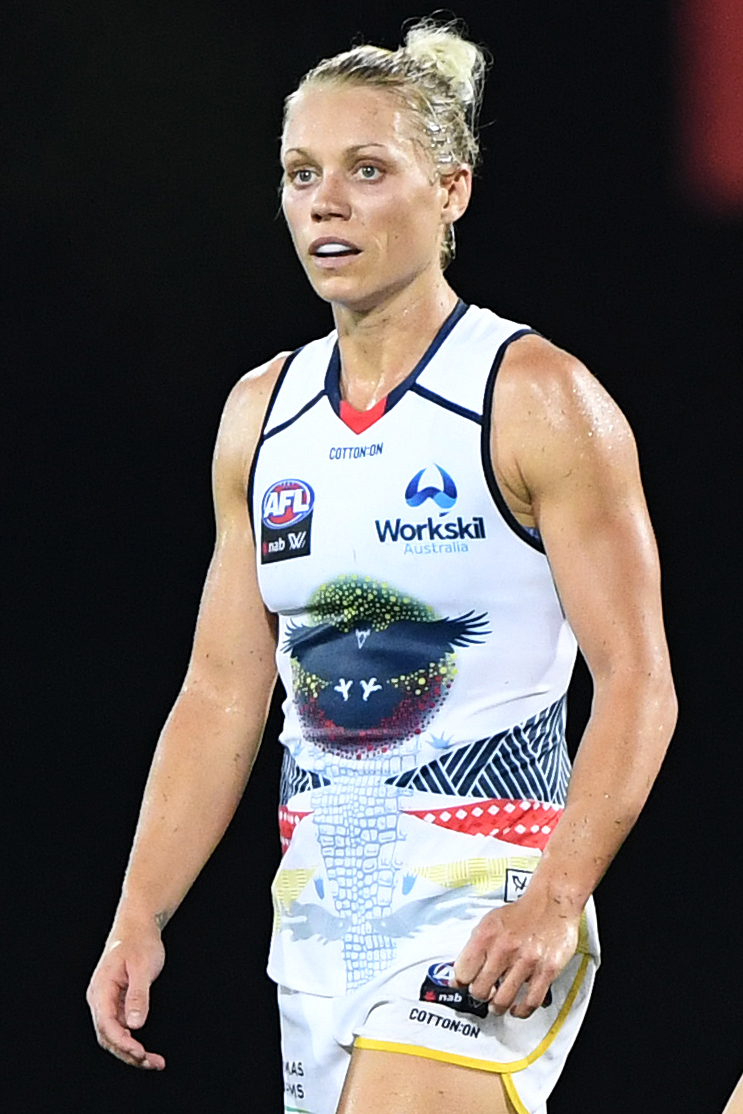
Erin Phillips won the league's best and fairest award for the season

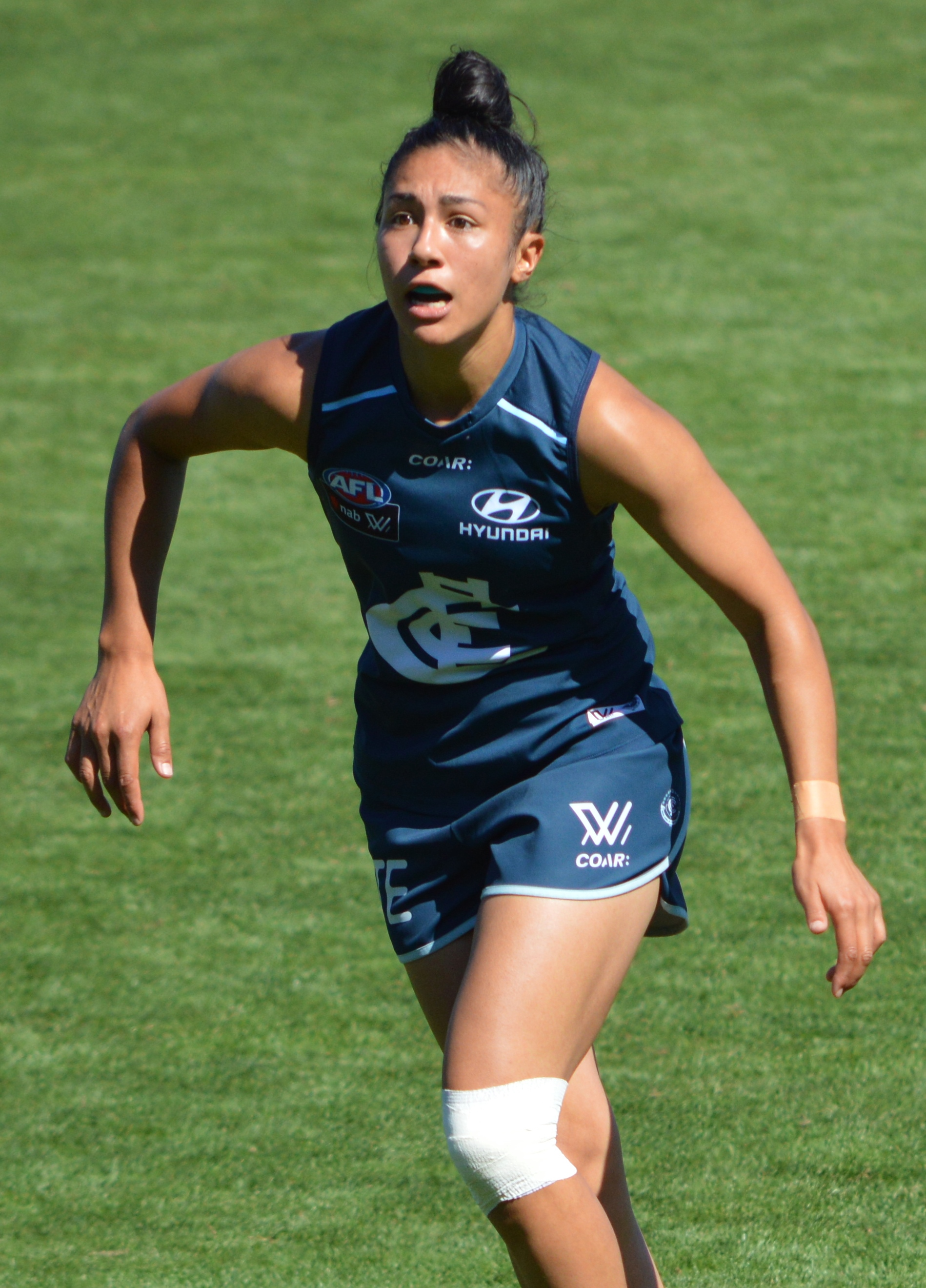
Darcy Vescio was the AFLW's leading goalkicker for 2017

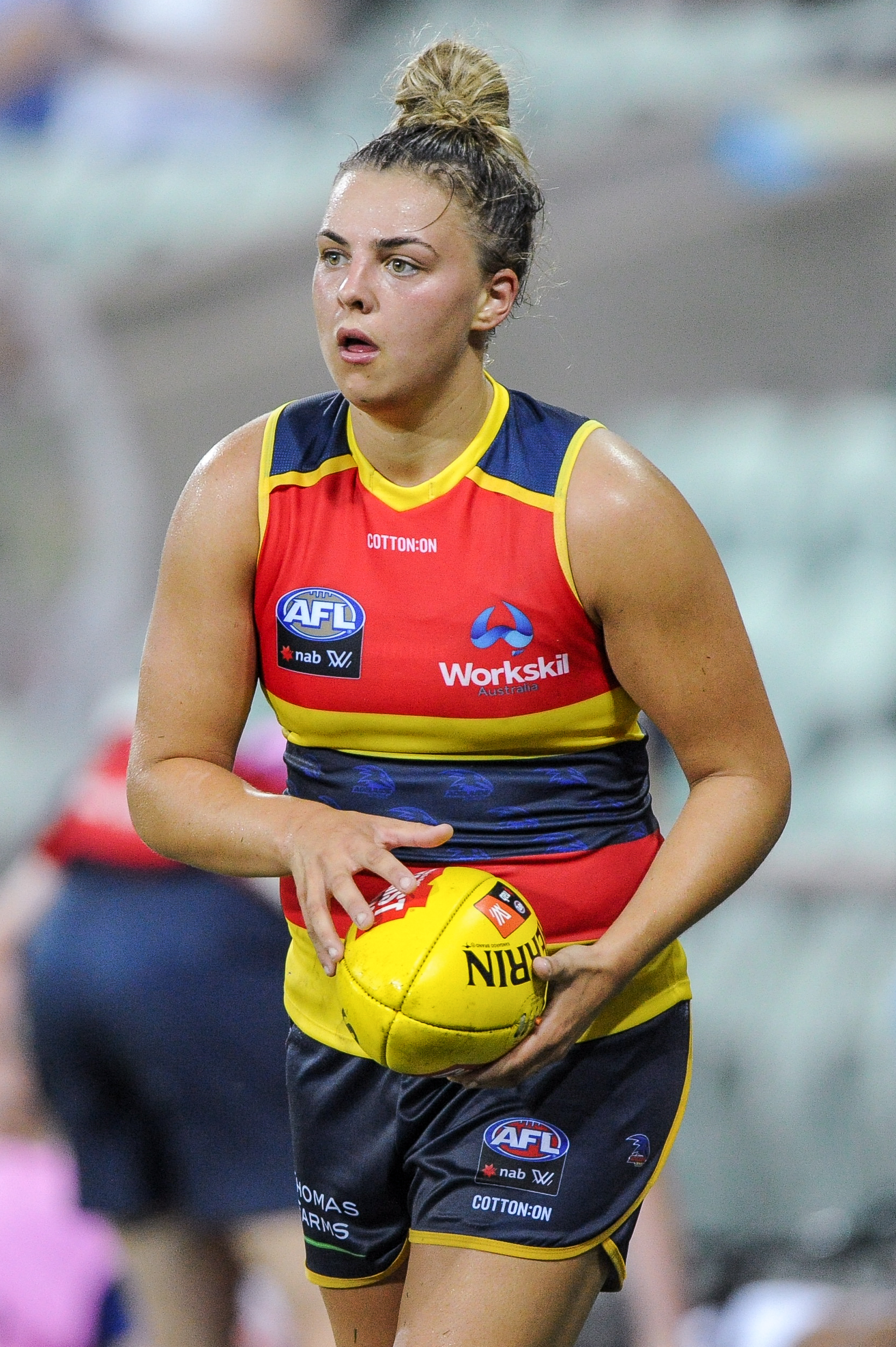
Ebony Marinoff was named the inaugural AFL Women's Rising Star winner

=== Awards ===
- The league best and fairest was awarded to Erin Phillips of Adelaide, who polled fourteen votes.
- The leading goalkicker was awarded to Darcy Vescio of Carlton, who kicked fourteen goals during the home and away season.
- The Rising Star was awarded to Ebony Marinoff of Adelaide.
- The best on ground in the AFLW Grand Final was awarded to Erin Phillips of Adelaide.
- The goal of the year was awarded to Erin Phillips of Adelaide.
- The mark of the year was awarded to Darcy Vescio of Carlton.
- The minor premiership was awarded to Brisbane.
- The wooden spoon was "awarded" to Greater Western Sydney.
- AFLW Players Association awards
  - The most valuable player was awarded to Erin Phillips of Adelaide.
  - The most courageous player was awarded to Chelsea Randall of Adelaide.
  - The best captain was awarded to Daisy Pearce of Melbourne.

==== Best and fairest ====
Table of club best and fairest award recipients
Club	Award name	Player	Ref.
Adelaide	Club Champion	Erin Phillips	
Brisbane	—N/a	Emily Bates	
Carlton	—N/a	Brianna Davey	
Collingwood	—N/a	Nicola Stevens	
Fremantle	—N/a	Dana Hooker	
Greater Western Sydney	Gabrielle Trainor Medal	Jessica Dal Pos	
Melbourne	—N/a	Daisy Pearce	
Western Bulldogs	Susan Alberti Award	Ellie Blackburn	
Western Bulldogs	Susan Alberti Award	Emma Kearney	

==== AFLW leading goalkicker ====
- Numbers highlighted in blue indicates the player led the season's goal kicking tally at the end of that round.

	Player	1	2	3	4	5	6	7	Total
1	Darcy Vescio	4_{4}	2_{6}	1_{7}	1_{8}	3_{11}	3_{14}	0_{14}	14
2	Sarah Perkins	1_{1}	2_{3}	0_{3}	1_{4}	2_{6}	1_{7}	4_{11}	11
3	Kate McCarthy	1_{1}	0_{1}	2_{3}	2_{5}	2_{7}	1_{8}	1_{8}	9
3	Alyssa Mifsud	0_{0}	1_{1}	3_{4}	2_{6}	0_{6}	1_{7}	2_{9}	9
5	Erin Phillips	3_{3}	0_{3}	1_{4}	1_{5}	0_{5}	0_{5}	3_{8}	8
6	Moana Hope	0_{0}	1_{1}	0_{1}	1_{2}	1_{3}	2_{5}	2_{7}	7
6	Phoebe McWilliams	1_{1}	1_{2}	2_{4}	0_{4}	0_{4}	2_{6}	1_{7}	7
8	Jess Cameron	0_{0}	1_{1}	1_{2}	0_{3}	1_{3}	1_{4}	2_{6}	6
8	Ellie Blackburn	1_{1}	0_{1}	0_{1}	1_{2}	3_{5}	0_{5}	1_{6}	6

==== All-Australian team ====
The final All-Australian team was announced on 28 March. Grand finalists Adelaide and Brisbane had the most representatives with five each, and every team had at least one representative. Melbourne captain Daisy Pearce was announced as the All-Australian captain and Adelaide co-captain Erin Phillips was announced as the vice-captain.

2017 AFL Women's All-Australian team
B:	Nicola Stevens (Collingwood)	Courtney Cramey (Adelaide)	
HB:	Chelsea Randall (Adelaide)	Brianna Davey (Carlton)	Karen Paxman (Melbourne)
C:	Elise O'Dea (Melbourne)	Daisy Pearce (Melbourne) (captain)	Emma Kearney (Western Bulldogs)
HF:	Erin Phillips (Adelaide) (vice-captain)	Sabrina Frederick-Traub (Brisbane)	Ellie Blackburn (Western Bulldogs)
F:	Sarah Perkins (Adelaide)	Darcy Vescio (Carlton)	
Foll:	Emma King (Collingwood)	Kara Donnellan (Fremantle)	Emily Bates (Brisbane)
Int:	Jessica Dal Pos (Greater Western Sydney)	Kate McCarthy (Brisbane)	Ebony Marinoff (Adelaide)
Int:	Tayla Harris (Brisbane)	Melissa Hickey (Melbourne)	Sam Virgo (Brisbane)
Coach:	Bec Goddard (Adelaide)		

== State of Origin ==
In mid-July the AFL announced a State of Origin representative match would be held for AFL Women's players during the AFL season pre-finals bye. A team of players born in Victoria would play a single exhibition match against a team of players from the rest of Australia at Etihad Stadium on the evening of Saturday 2 September. Initial squads for the match were announced on 25 July including that Melbourne AFLW football operations manager Debbie Lee would coach Victoria, while Adelaide premiership coach Bec Goddard, would coach the Allies.

=== Squads ===
Victoria (AFL Women's)
Playing list		Coaching staff
1 Brianna Davey; 2 Alicia Eva; 3 Jaimee Lambert; 4 Karen Paxman; 5 Emma Kearney; 6 Daisy Pearce (c); 8 Sarah Hosking; 9 Ellie Blackburn; 10 Kaitlyn Ashmore; 11 Lauren Spark; 12 Jessica Dal Pos	13 Lauren Arnell; 14 Lily Mithen; 15 Kara Donnellan; 16 Jasmine Garner; 17 Steph Chiocci; 18 Melissa Hickey; 19 Sarah D'Arcy; 21 Nicola Stevens; 23 Moana Hope; 28 Sarah Perkins; 30 Alison Downie	Head coach: Debbie Lee; Legend: (c) Captain(s); (vc) Vice-captain(s); Updated: 3 September 2017; Source(s): Players, Coaches

Allies (AFL Women's)
Playing list		Coaching staff
1 Emily Bates; 3 Katie Brennan; 4 Emma Swanson; 5 Elise O'Dea; 7 Tayla Harris; 8 Emma Zielke (vc); 9 Kate McCarthy; 10 Ebony Marinoff; 11 Leah Kaslar; 12 Ebony Antonio; 13 Jess Sedunary	14 Sabrina Frederick-Traub; 15 Renee Tomkins; 16 Stevie-Lee Thompson; 17 Dana Hooker; 20 Hayley Miller; 22 Courtney Cramey; 23 Kirby Bentley; 24 Jess Wuetschner; 26 Chelsea Randall (c); 35 Bianca Jakobsson; 60 Emma King	Head coach: Bec Goddard; Legend: (c) Captain(s); (vc) Vice-captain(s); Updated: 3 September 2017; Source(s): Players, Coaches

=== Result ===
AFLW State of Origin
Saturday, 2 September (7:40 pm)	Victoria	def.	Allies	Etihad Stadium (crowd: 9,400)	Report
0.2.2 (14); 0.8.5 (53); 0.11.7 (73); 0.17.11 (113)	Q1; Q2; Q3; Final	0.1.1 (7); 0.2.2 (14); 0.2.2 (14); 0.2.4 (16)	Umpires: Bryce, Cheever, Rodger; Best on ground: Daisy Pearce; Television broadcast: Network Seven, Fox Footy
Super goals: Nil; Garner 5, Blackburn 3, Ashmore 2, Eva, Lambert, Paxman, Kearney, Pearce, D'Arcy, Hope	Goals	Super goals: Nil; Harris, Wuetschner
Pearce, Paxman, Donnellan, Garner, Eva, Kearney, Blackburn	Best	King, Bates, Antonio, Brennan, Marinoff
Lambert (hip)	Injuries	Harris (knee), Zielke (ribs), Randall (thigh), Bentley (knee)
Nil	Reports	Nil

== See also ==
- 2016 AFL Women's draft
