= Sabrina Frederick =

Australian rules footballer

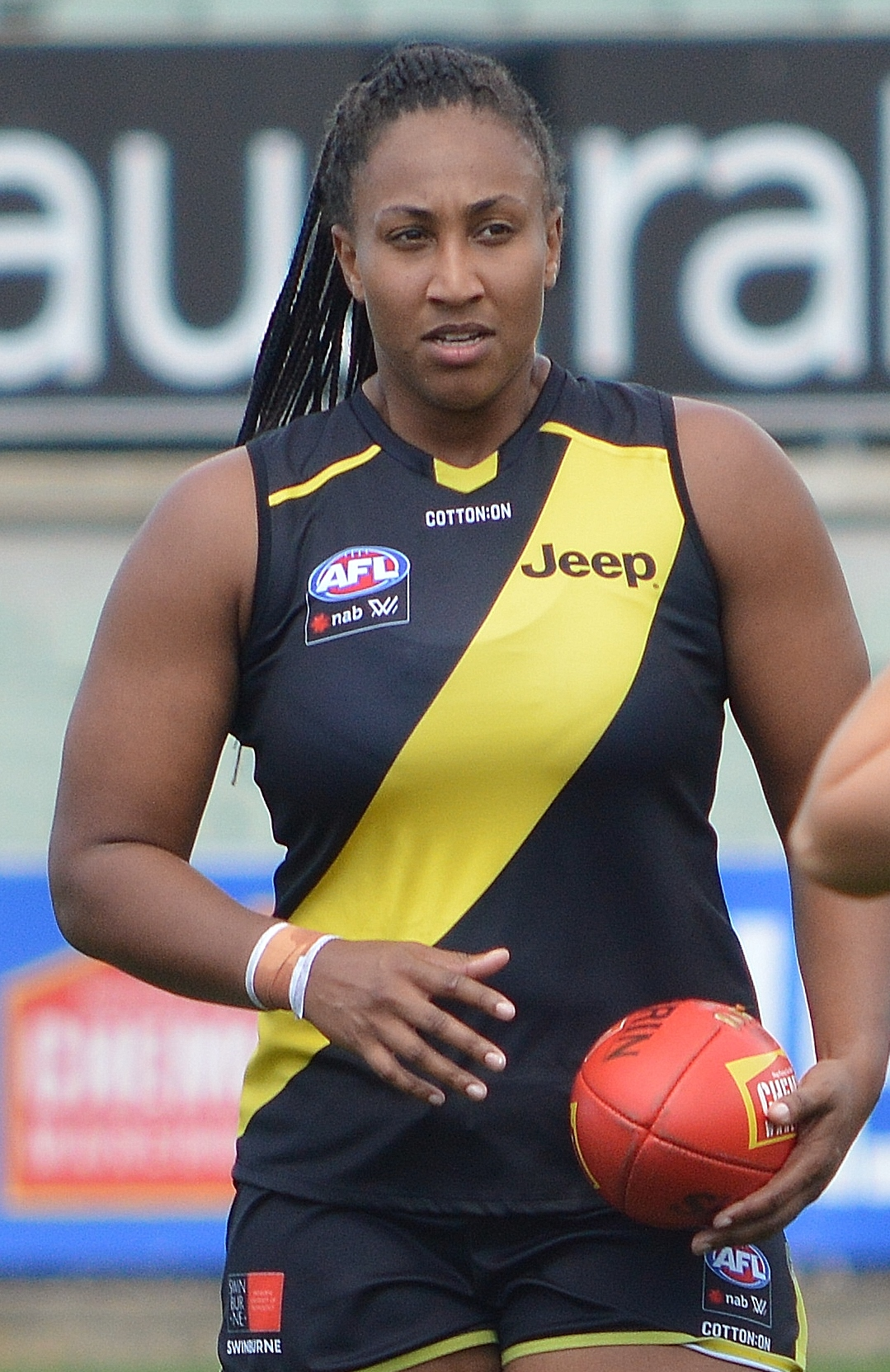
- Frederick with Richmond in 2020

Personal information
- Full name: Sabrina Frederick
- Nickname: Sabs
- Born: 14 November 1996 (age 30); Brighton, England
- Original team: South Fremantle (WAWFL)
- Draft: 2016 marquee selection
- Debut: Round 1, 2017, Brisbane vs. Melbourne, at Casey Fields
- Height: 182 cm (6 ft 0 in)
- Position: Forward

Playing career
| Years | Club | Games (Goals) |
| 2017–2019 | Brisbane | 23 (15) |
| 2020–2021 | Richmond | 15 (5) |
| 2022 (S6)–2026 | Collingwood | 65 (15) |
| Total | | 103 (35) |

Representative team honours^{2}
| Years | Team | Games (Goals) |
| 2017 | The Allies | 1 (0) |
- ^{2} Representative statistics correct as of 2017.

Career highlights
- 2× AFL Women's All-Australian team: 2017, 2018; AFL Women's Rising Star nominee: 2017

Sabrina Frederick (formerly Frederick-Traub; born 23 November 1996) is a retired Australian rules footballer. She played for Brisbane, Richmond, and Collingwood in the AFL Women's (AFLW). She was one of Brisbane's two marquee players for the 2017 season, alongside Tayla Harris.

== Early life ==
Frederick was born in Brighton, England where she spent her early years. Her mother is White British and her biological father is of Jamaican and Antiguan descent. Her step-father's surname "Traub" was added to her name as a child, but in 2020 she announced that she was reverting to the name "Frederick" for several reasons.

Frederick and her family moved to Australia when she was seven, although she has said considers herself English and "my family still kept me immersed in the British culture". She grew up in Pinjarra, Western Australia.

== Junior and state-league football ==
Frederick played in mixed-gender teams until the age of thirteen, when she began playing for the Peel Thunderbirds (an all-female team). She eventually progressed to the club's senior team in the West Australian Women's Football League (WAWFL). In 2013, Frederick captained an Australian youth girls team on a tour of New Zealand. She switched to South Fremantle for the 2014 WAWFL season, and in 2015 and 2016 played in exhibition matches for Melbourne against the Western Bulldogs. She kicked three goals in the latter game.

== AFL Women's career ==
=== Brisbane (2017–2019) ===
In July 2016, Frederick was selected by Brisbane as one of the club's inaugural marquee players. She made her senior debut for Brisbane in round one of the 2017 season, against Melbourne at Casey Fields. She was responsible for kicking the team's first goal of the competition. Frederick recorded 13 disposals, six marks, and a goal against Greater Western Sydney in round four, for which she was nominated for the 2017 Rising Star award.

On 17 May 2017, Brisbane announced they had signed Frederick for the 2018 season.

Frederick was listed in the 2017 and 2018 All-Australian teams.

She was retrospectively named in the AFL Players Association's 2017–2019 22 Under 22 team, which recognises the best young players in the league.

=== Richmond (2020–2021) ===
In April 2019, Frederick expressed a desire to move to Victoria. Frederick was traded to expansion club Richmond in exchange for a first round draft selection which was slated at the time to be pick 12 in the upcoming 2019 AFL Women's draft. After just two years with Richmond, Frederick requested a trade to Collingwood in May 2021.

=== Collingwood (2022–2026) ===
With the opening of the trade period on 31 May 2021, Frederick was traded to Collingwood in exchange for Maddie Shevlin.

In October 2026, Frederick announced her retirement after 10 seasons playing.

== Statistics ==
Statistics are correct to the end of the 2025 season.

Legend
| G | Goals | K | Kicks | D | Disposals | T | Tackles |
| B | Behinds | H | Handballs | M | Marks | H/O | Hit-outs |

| Season | Team | No. | Games | Totals | | | | | | | | Averages (per game) | | | | | | | | Votes |
| Season | Team | No. | Games | G | B | K | H | D | M | T | H/O | G | B | K | H | D | M | T | H/O | Votes |
|---|---|---|---|---|---|---|---|---|---|---|---|---|---|---|---|---|---|---|---|---|
| 2017 | Brisbane | 14 | 8 | 6 | 4 | 72 | 22 | 94 | 20 | 15 | 58 | 0.8 | 0.5 | 9.0 | 2.8 | 11.8 | 2.5 | 1.9 | 7.3 | 4 |
| 2018 | Brisbane | 14 | 8 | 8 | 7 | 65 | 26 | 91 | 29 | 21 | 27 | 1.0 | 0.9 | 8.1 | 3.3 | 11.4 | 3.6 | 2.6 | 3.4 | 6 |
| 2019 | Brisbane | 14 | 7 | 1 | 7 | 44 | 27 | 71 | 21 | 23 | 7 | 0.1 | 1.0 | 6.3 | 3.9 | 10.1 | 3.0 | 3.3 | 1.0 | 0 |
| 2020 | Richmond | 14 | 6 | 3 | 7 | 30 | 15 | 45 | 15 | 13 | 26 | 0.5 | 1.2 | 5.0 | 2.5 | 7.5 | 2.5 | 2.2 | 4.3 | 0 |
| 2021 | Richmond | 14 | 9 | 2 | 4 | 43 | 35 | 78 | 17 | 14 | 44 | 0.2 | 0.4 | 4.8 | 3.9 | 8.7 | 1.9 | 1.6 | 4.9 | 0 |
| 2022 (S6) | Collingwood | 1 | 9 | 4 | 8 | 35 | 41 | 76 | 18 | 15 | 26 | 0.4 | 0.9 | 3.9 | 4.6 | 8.4 | 2.0 | 1.7 | 2.9 | 0 |
| 2022 (S7) | Collingwood | 1 | 12 | 2 | 8 | 54 | 41 | 95 | 25 | 25 | 73 | 0.2 | 0.7 | 4.5 | 3.4 | 7.9 | 2.1 | 2.1 | 6.1 | 0 |
| 2023 | Collingwood | 1 | 10 | 4 | 2 | 74 | 24 | 98 | 20 | 41 | 287 | 0.4 | 0.2 | 7.4 | 2.4 | 9.8 | 2.0 | 4.1 | 28.7 | 4 |
| 2024 | Collingwood | 1 | 11 | 1 | 1 | 63 | 61 | 124 | 21 | 34 | 274 | 0.1 | 0.1 | 5.7 | 5.5 | 11.3 | 1.9 | 3.1 | 24.9 | 3 |
| 2024 | Collingwood | 1 | 12 | 3 | 1 | 58 | 49 | 107 | 28 | 27 | 132 | 0.3 | 0.1 | 4.8 | 4.1 | 8.9 | 2.3 | 2.3 | 11.0 | 0 |
| Career | | | 92 | 34 | 49 | 538 | 341 | 879 | 214 | 228 | 954 | 0.4 | 0.5 | 5.8 | 3.7 | 9.6 | 2.3 | 2.5 | 10.4 | 17 |

== Television ==
In 2020, it was announced Frederick would be participating the Seven Network's reality program SAS Australia. Frederick was one of three recruits to pass selection along with Merrick Watts and Nick Cummins. Along with Millie Boyle, she is one of just two female recruits to successfully pass selection.

== Personal life ==
Frederick studied psychology at Murdoch University, and was part of the university's Elite Athlete Program. She previously worked at AFL Queensland as the Participation Programs Coordinator for Game Development.

Frederick married Lili Cadee-Matthews in December 2021 in Melbourne. In January 2022, Frederick announced that Cadee-Matthews was pregnant with the couple's first child.
