= Sarah D'Arcy =

Australian rules footballer

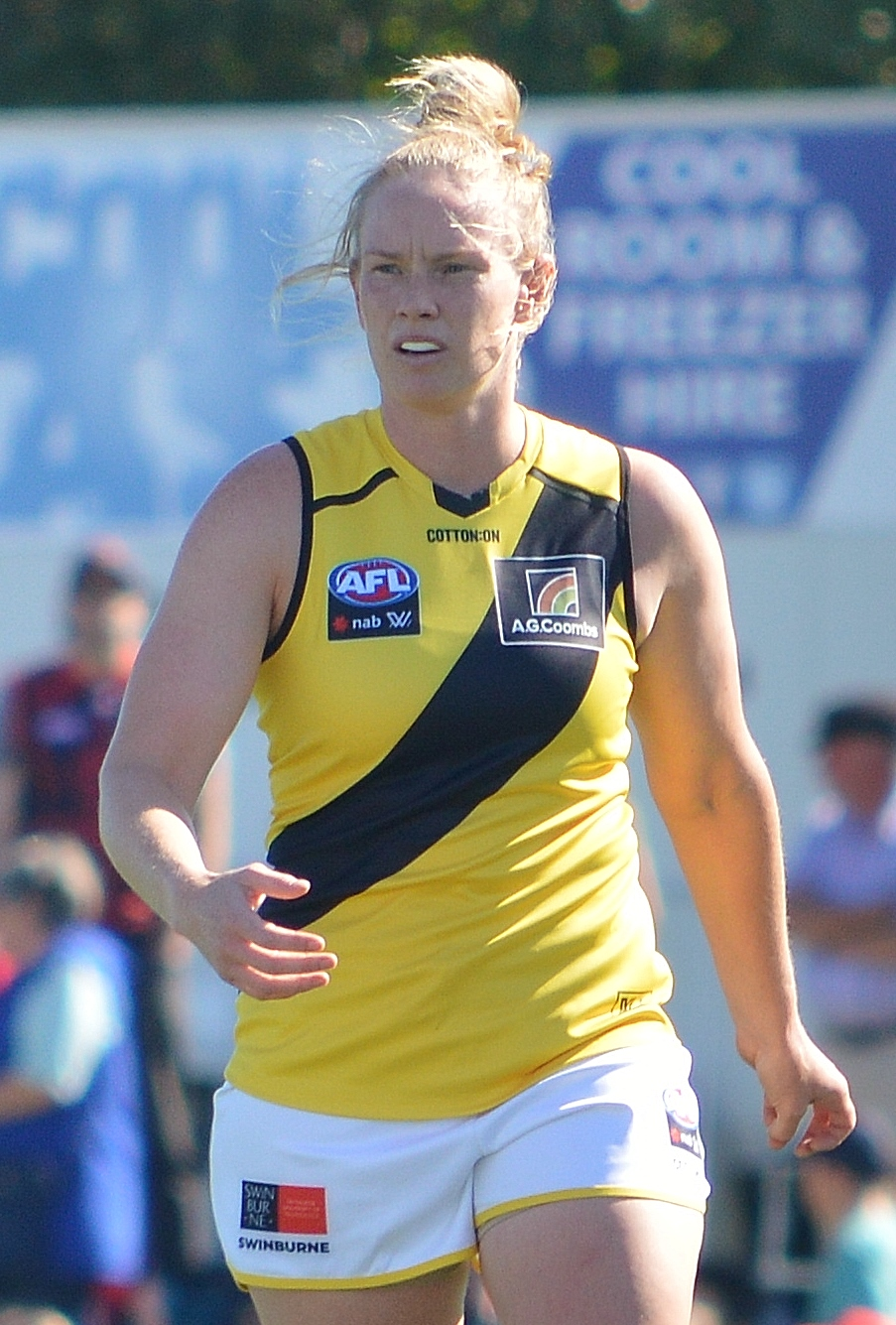
- D'Arcy with Richmond in February 2021

Personal information
- Full name: Sarah D'Arcy
- Born: 22 August 1991 (age 35); Healesville, Australia
- Original team: Eastern Devils (VFLW)
- Draft: No. 22, 2016 national draft
- Debut: Round 1, 2017, Collingwood vs. Carlton, at IKON Park
- Height: 171 cm (5 ft 7 in)
- Position: Half-forward

Club information
- Current club: Richmond
- Number: 12

Playing career^{1}
Years	Club	Games (Goals)
2017–2020	Collingwood	24 (10)
2021–	Richmond	23 (3)
Total		47 (13)

Representative team honours^{2}
Years	Team	Games (Goals)
2017	Victoria	1 (1)
- ^{1} Playing statistics correct to the end of the 2023 season.^{2} Representative statistics correct as of 2017.

Career highlights
- Collingwood leading goalkicker: 2019

Sarah D'Arcy (born 22 August 1991) is an Australian rules footballer with the Richmond Football Club in the AFL Women's competition (AFLW). Previously, she played four seasons at Collingwood including in the club's inaugural team.

== Early life and state football ==
D'Arcy is originally from Healesville and was introduced to football via her local Auskick program. She switched to soccer before returning to play football with the under-14 boys at Healesville Football Club. After two games she was playing with Yarra Valley Cougars in the senior women's division. Four years after joining the Cougars, D'Arcy joined the Eastern Devils in the VFLW. During her time at the Eastern Devils, she played for both Melbourne and Western Bulldogs in exhibition matches. Western Bulldogs chose her with pick No. 34 for the 2013 exhibition match. In the 2016 season, D'Arcy kicked 30 goals for the Eastern Devils.

== AFL Women's career ==
Ahead of the 2017 season, Collingwood player Emma King said she thinks D'Arcy will be a star, despite not many having heard of her. She described her as probably one of the best half-forwards with a great hand and great lead, predicting that she'll be very dominant in Collingwood's forward line. D'Arcy made her debut in round 1, 2017, in the inaugural AFLW match at IKON Park against Carlton, in which she had 14 disposals and was one of Collingwood's best players. She was one of the standout performers for the club, leading the team with 39 disposals after three weeks.

Collingwood re-signed D'Arcy for the 2018 season during the trade period in May 2017. On 2 September, D'Arcy played for Victoria in the inaugural AFL Women's State of Origin match, where she swapped between full-forward and higher up the ground and kicked a banana goal from an acute angle.

D'Arcy returned to the Collingwood side in round 1, 2018, but was the subject of controversy after she was reported for kicking Carlton's Sarah Hosking in the groin. She was subsequently offered and accepted a two match ban under the AFL's match review system. The incident was assessed under the system as "intentional conduct medium impact to the groin". She was the first player in either the AFLW or AFL to be sanctioned under the new system overseen by match review officer Michael Christian.

Collingwood re-signed D'Arcy for the 2019 season during the trade period in June 2018.

At the conclusion of the 2020 season, D'Arcy was traded to Richmond alongside teammate Sarah Dargan, in a package deal in exchange for a third and fourth round pick at the 2020 draft.

== Personal life ==
Richmond men's hall of famer Jack Titus was the cousin of D'arcy's grandfather.

== Statistics ==
Statistics are correct to round 3, 2022 season 6

Legend
G	Goals	K	Kicks	D	Disposals	T	Tackles
B	Behinds	H	Handballs	M	Marks

Season	Team	No.	Games	Totals							Averages (per game)						
Season	Team	No.	Games	G	B	K	H	D	M	T	G	B	K	H	D	M	T
2017	Collingwood	4	7	2	4	48	28	76	18	12	0.3	0.6	6.9	4.0	10.9	2.6	1.7
2018	Collingwood	4	5	0	0	28	15	43	15	12	0.0	0.0	5.6	3.0	8.6	3.0	2.4
2019	Collingwood	4	5	4	0	41	13	54	28	6	0.8	0.0	8.2	2.6	10.8	5.6	1.2
2020	Collingwood	4	7	4	11	39	25	64	21	12	0.6	1.6	5.6	3.6	9.1	3.0	1.7
2021	Richmond	12	9	0	0	49	45	94	18	14	0.0	0.0	5.4	5.0	10.4	2.0	1.6
2022 (S6)	Richmond	12	2	1	0	13	4	17	9	2	0.5	0.0	6.5	2.0	8.5	4.5	1.0
Career			35	11	15	218	130	348	109	58	0.3	0.4	6.2	3.7	9.9	3.1	1.7
