= Darcy Vescio =

Australian rules footballer

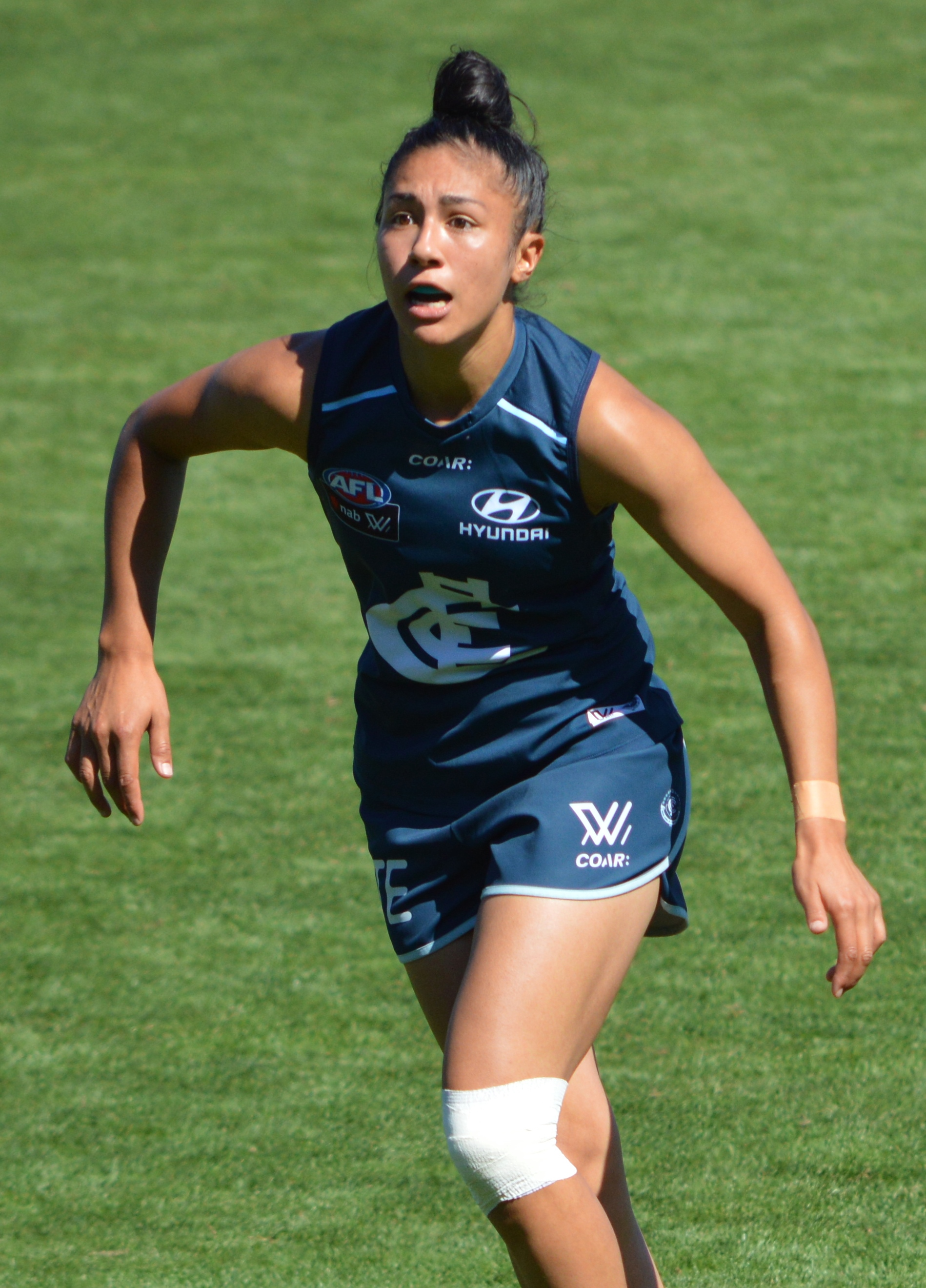
- Vescio playing for Carlton in March 2017

Personal information
- Full name: Darcy Anne Vescio
- Born: 3 August 1993 (age 33); Markwood, Victoria
- Original team: Darebin Falcons (VWFL)
- Draft: Marquee player 2016: Carlton
- Debut: Round 1, 2017, Carlton vs. Collingwood, at IKON Park
- Height: 167 cm (5 ft 6 in)
- Position: Forward

Club information
- Current club: Carlton
- Number: 3

Playing career^{1}
Years	Club	Games (Goals)
2017–	Carlton	92 (66)
- ^{1} Playing statistics correct to the end of the 2025 season.

Career highlights
- AFLW: All-Australia: 2017, 2021; Carlton best and fairest: 2021; League leading goalkicker: 2017, 2021; 3× Carlton Leading Goalkicker: 2017, 2018, 2021; Mark of the Year: 2017; State: 4× VWFL premiership: (2013, 2014, 2015, 2016); 2× VWFL Grand Final best on ground: (2015, 2016); VWFL Leading Goalkicker: 2018; Carlton's Leading Goalkicker: 2018

Darcy Vescio (born 3 August 1993) is an Australian rules footballer playing for the Carlton Football Club in the AFL Women's competition. As a heavily marketed marquee player, Vescio has been referred to as a "household name" in Australia by ESPN.

== Junior and state league football ==
Vescio began playing football with their brother at the age of five. Vescio was a participant in the Auskick program. They stopped playing competitive football at the age of fourteen, when they were no longer allowed to play with the youth boys team.

Vescio started playing again at the age of eighteen, when they moved to Melbourne from their home town of Wangaratta and joined the Darebin Falcons in the Victorian Women's Football League (VWFL). They won four premierships with the club in consecutive seasons from 2013 to 2016, and won the Lisa Hardeman Medal for best on ground performances in two of these matches in 2015 and 2016.

Vescio has represented Victoria at the AFL Women's National Championship in 2013 and 2015.

They were drafted by the Western Bulldogs in 2014, and played for the club in exhibition series matches between 2014 and 2016.

In 2018, Vescio played VFLW with the Carlton Football Club and won the club's best and fairest. In the final round of the season, Vescio kicked 9 goals to claim the league's leading goal kicking award.

== AFL Women's career ==
Vescio was signed as a marquee player by Carlton in July 2016, ahead of the league's inaugural 2017 season. They made their debut in round 1, 2017, in the club and the league's inaugural match at IKON Park against Collingwood. They kicked a game-high four goals in the match, which was more than Collingwood's overall team score. This was acknowledged by the AFL Players Association, highlighting Vescio as Player of the Week.

At the conclusion of the 2017 season, Vescio was the AFLW leading goalkicker, was nominated by their teammates for the AFLW Players’ Most Valuable Player Award, and was listed in the 2017 All-Australian team. Their mark in front of goal in round five against Western Bulldogs was voted by fans as Mark of the Year.

Carlton signed Vescio for the 2018 season during the trade period in May 2017. They played in all seven of Carlton's matches that season and kicked five goals, tying Tayla Harris and sharing the club's leading goalkicker award with her.

For the 2019 season, Vescio was elevated to the leadership group alongside Shae Audley, Kerryn Harrington and Sarah Hosking, with Bri Davey serving as captain and Katie Loynes as vice-captain.

They signed a two-year contract with Carlton on 10 June 2021, after it was revealed the team had conducted a mass re-signing of 13 players. Vescio was awarded with their second All-Australian blazer, named on the interchange bench. Vescio achieved selection in Champion Data's 2021 AFLW All-Star stats team, after leading the league for goals in the 2021 AFL Women's season, totalling 1.8 a game.

== Statistics ==
Statistics are correct to the end of the 2024 season

Legend
G	Goals	K	Kicks	D	Disposals	T	Tackles
B	Behinds	H	Handballs	M	Marks

Darcy Vescio AFLW statistics
Season	Team	No.	Games	Totals							Averages (per game)							Votes
Season	Team	No.	Games	G	B	K	H	D	M	T	G	B	K	H	D	M	T	Votes
2017	Carlton	3	7	14^{§}	4	39	11	50	13	18	2.0^{§}	0.6	5.6	1.6	7.1	1.9	2.6	7
2018	Carlton	3	7	5	6	38	9	47	5	17	0.7	0.9	5.4	1.3	6.7	0.7	2.4	0
2019	Carlton	3	9	5	10	50	31	81	17	13	0.6	1.1	5.6	3.4	9.0	1.9	1.4	0
2020	Carlton	3	7	3	1	50	26	76	16	15	0.4	0.1	7.1	3.7	10.9	2.3	2.1	0
2021	Carlton	3	9	16^{§}	4	56	26	82	28	16	1.8^{§}	0.4	6.2	2.9	9.1	3.1	1.8	
2022	Carlton	3	9	4	2	49	29	78	19	22	0.7	0.9	5.7	2.6	8.3	2.2	1.8	
2023	Carlton	3	10	7	6	53	24	77	15	40	0.3	0.7	5.3	2.4	7.7	1.5	4.0	
2024	Carlton	3	9	2	4	42	30	72	13	25	0.2	0.4	4.7	3.3	8.0	1.4	2.8	
Career			77	64	48	434	212	646	148	184	0.8	0.6	5.6	2.8	8.4	1.9	2.4	

== Personal life ==
Vescio was born and raised in the Victorian town of Markwood near Wangaratta and attended school at Wangaratta High School. They previously worked part-time at the Carlton Football Club as a graphic designer. They were responsible for designing the club's inaugural women's guernsey and pride guernsey.

Vescio is of Italian and Chinese descent through their paternal and maternal grandparents respectively, who immigrated from Calabria and Guangdong. Vescio is an AFL Multicultural Ambassador and in 2018, the Carlton Football Club made a documentary, Bloodlines: Darcy Vescio, which focused on Vescio's dual heritage.

On 29 December 2021, Vescio publicly came out as non-binary and announced the decision to change their gender pronouns to they/them, expressing that "[s]haring this feels a bit daunting but brings me a lot of warmth and happiness".
