= Kaitlyn Ashmore =

Australian rules footballer

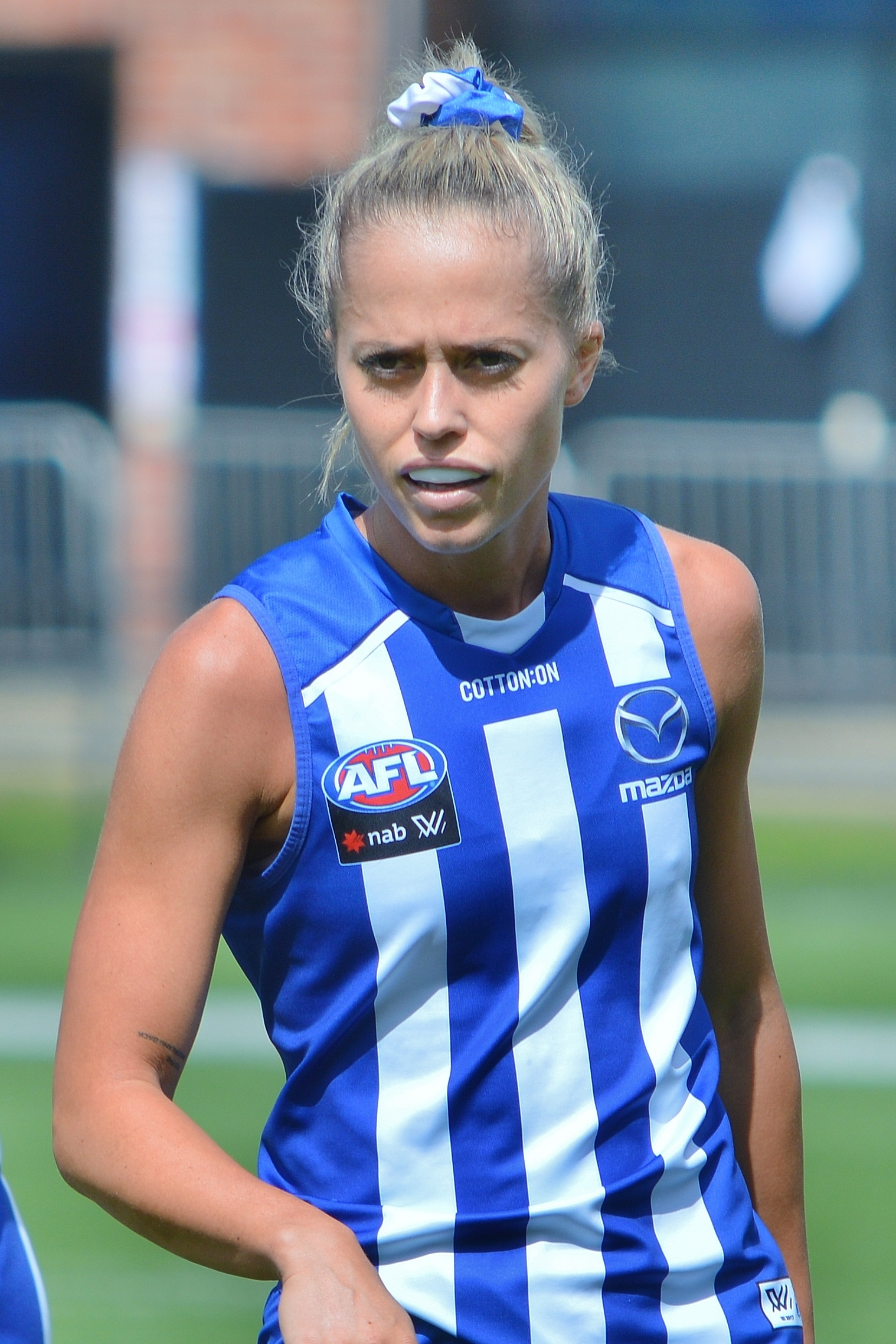
- Ashmore with North Melbourne in March 2021

Personal information
- Full name: Kaitlyn Michelle Ashmore
- Born: 8 November 1991 (age 35)
- Original team: Melbourne University (VFLW)
- Draft: 2016 priority signing
- Debut: Round 1, 2017, Brisbane vs. Melbourne, at Casey Fields
- Height: 173 cm (5 ft 8 in)
- Weight: 60 kg (132 lb)
- Position: Midfielder

Club information
- Current club: Hawthorn
- Number: 10

Playing career^{1}
Years	Club	Games (Goals)
2017–2018	Brisbane	16 (5)
2019–2022 (S6)	North Melbourne	33 (17)
2022 (S7)–	Hawthorn	56 (13)
Total		105 (35)

Representative team honours^{2}
Years	Team	Games (Goals)
2017	Victoria	1 (2)
- ^{1} Playing statistics correct to the end of 2025.^{2} Representative statistics correct as of 2017.

Career highlights
- North Melbourne leading goalkicker: 2020

Kaitlyn Michelle Ashmore (born 8 November 1991) is an Australian rules footballer playing for the Hawthorn Football Club in the AFL Women's (AFLW). She has previously played for Brisbane and North Melbourne. She was drafted by Brisbane as a priority signing in the 2016 AFL Women's draft.

== Early football career ==
Ashmore first played football in Ballarat. In 2012, she became a Vic Country representative in Australian rules football, and in the same year won the Pierre de Coubertin award from the Victorian Olympic Council as the most outstanding athlete. The next year, she was selected by the Melbourne Football Club to compete in the first AFL-sanctioned women's exhibition match against the Western Bulldogs. She was selected by Melbourne again in 2014.

After playing for Melbourne against the Western Bulldogs for two years, Ashmore was drafted by the Bulldogs with pick number 13 in the 2015 women’s AFL draft. With the Bulldogs in 2015, she played in the first ever women's AFL game to be live broadcast on television.

Concurrently with playing these early women's AFL exhibition games, Ashmore played for Melbourne University in the Victorian Women’s Football League premier division. In 2014, she also played for Federation University's gold medal winning team, and was selected in the All-Australian team at the Australian University Games.

== AFL Women's career ==
=== Brisbane ===
Ashmore was signed as a priority access player by Brisbane in August 2016, ahead of the inaugural AFL Women's season in 2017. This required her to relocate 1,600 km from Melbourne to Brisbane. At the end of the 2017 season, Ashmore was listed in the 40-player All-Australian squad. On 24 May 2017, Ashmore signed with Brisbane for the 2018 season.

=== North Melbourne ===
After two seasons at Brisbane, Ashmore joined North Melbourne who entered the AFLW competition in 2019. She returned for 2020 and 2021, and was the team's leading goalkicker in the shortened 2020 season with 9 goals.

In Round 6, 2021, she became the first AFLW player to win 25 games, ahead of any club reaching the milestone.

=== Hawthorn ===
In June 2022, Ashmore was traded to expansion club Hawthorn.

== Personal life ==
Ashmore completed a teaching degree at Federation University. She works as a primary school teacher in Melbourne.

== Statistics ==
Updated to the end of 2025

Legend
G	Goals	K	Kicks	D	Disposals	T	Tackles
B	Behinds	H	Handballs	M	Marks

Season	Team	No.	Games	Totals							Averages (per game)							Votes
Season	Team	No.	Games	G	B	K	H	D	M	T	G	B	K	H	D	M	T	Votes
2017	Brisbane	10	8	2	4	57	18	75	22	12	0.3	0.5	7.1	2.3	9.4	2.8	1.5	8
2018	Brisbane	10	8	3	5	54	28	82	24	28	0.4	0.6	6.8	3.5	10.3	3.0	3.5	0
2019	North Melbourne	10	7	4	3	63	8	71	29	38	0.6	0.4	9.0	1.1	10.1	4.1	5.4	0
2020	North Melbourne	10	7	9	3	44	10	54	16	20	1.3	0.4	6.3	1.4	7.7	2.3	2.9	2
2021	North Melbourne	10	10	1	8	105	32	137	37	32	0.1	0.8	10.5	3.2	13.7	3.7	3.2	0
2022 (S6)	North Melbourne	10	9	3	4	76	30	106	36	16	0.3	0.4	8.4	3.3	11.8	4.0	1.8	0
2022 (S7)	Hawthorn	10	9	1	3	79	31	110	25	47	0.1	0.3	8.8	3.4	12.2	2.8	5.2	2
2023	Hawthorn	10	10	1	2	105	45	150	36	38	0.1	0.2	10.5	4.5	15.0	3.6	3.8	3
2024	Hawthorn	10	13	4	3	98	47	145	37	44	0.3	0.2	7.5	3.6	11.2	2.8	3.4	4
2025	Hawthorn	10	10	3	2	63	32	95	21	36	0.3	0.2	6.3	3.2	9.5	2.1	3.6	0
Career			91	31	37	744	281	1025	283	311	0.3	0.4	8.2	3.1	11.3	3.1	3.4	15

== Honours and achievements ==
Team

- AFL Women's minor premiership (Brisbane): 2017
- McClelland Trophy (Hawthorn): 2024

Individual

- North Melbourne leading goalkicker: 2020
