= 2022 AFL Women's season 6 best and fairest =

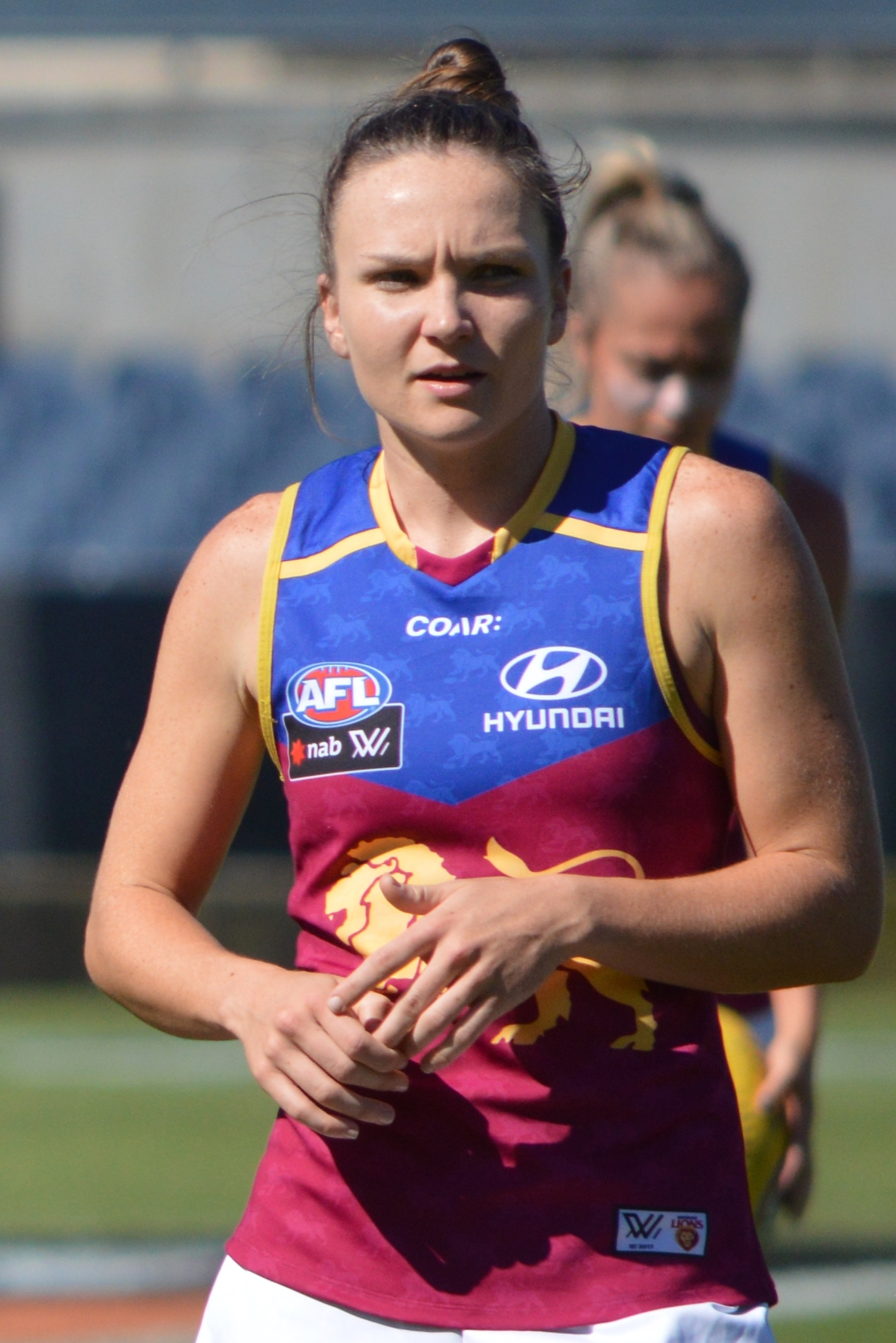
- Emily Bates, season 6 winner
- Date: 5 April 2022
- Venue: Crown Melbourne
- Hosted by: Sarah Jones
- Winner: Emily Bates (Brisbane)

Television/radio coverage
- Network: Fox Footy

The 2022 AFL Women's season 6 best and fairest award was presented to the player adjudged the best and fairest player during 2022 AFL Women's season 6. Emily Bates of the Brisbane Lions won the award with 21 votes.

== Leading votegetters ==
Placing	Player	Votes
1st	Emily Bates (Brisbane)	21
2nd	Anne Hatchard (Adelaide)	20
3rd	Ebony Marinoff (Adelaide)	18
4th	Ashleigh Riddell (North Melbourne)	17
5th	Hayley Miller (Fremantle)	15
6th	Kiara Bowers (Fremantle)	13
=7th	Ellie Blackburn (Western Bulldogs)	12
=7th	Brittany Bonnici (Collingwood)	12
=7th	Jaimee Lambert (Collingwood)	12
=10th	Monique Conti (Richmond)	11
=10th	Jasmine Garner (North Melbourne)	11
=10th	Tilly Lucas-Rodd (St Kilda)	11

== Voting procedure ==
The three field umpires (the umpires who control the flow of the game, as opposed to goal or boundary umpires) confer after each match and award three votes, two votes and one vote to the players they regard as the best, second-best and third-best in the match, respectively. The votes are kept secret until the awards night, and are read and tallied on the evening.
