= Jess Dal Pos =

Australian rules footballer

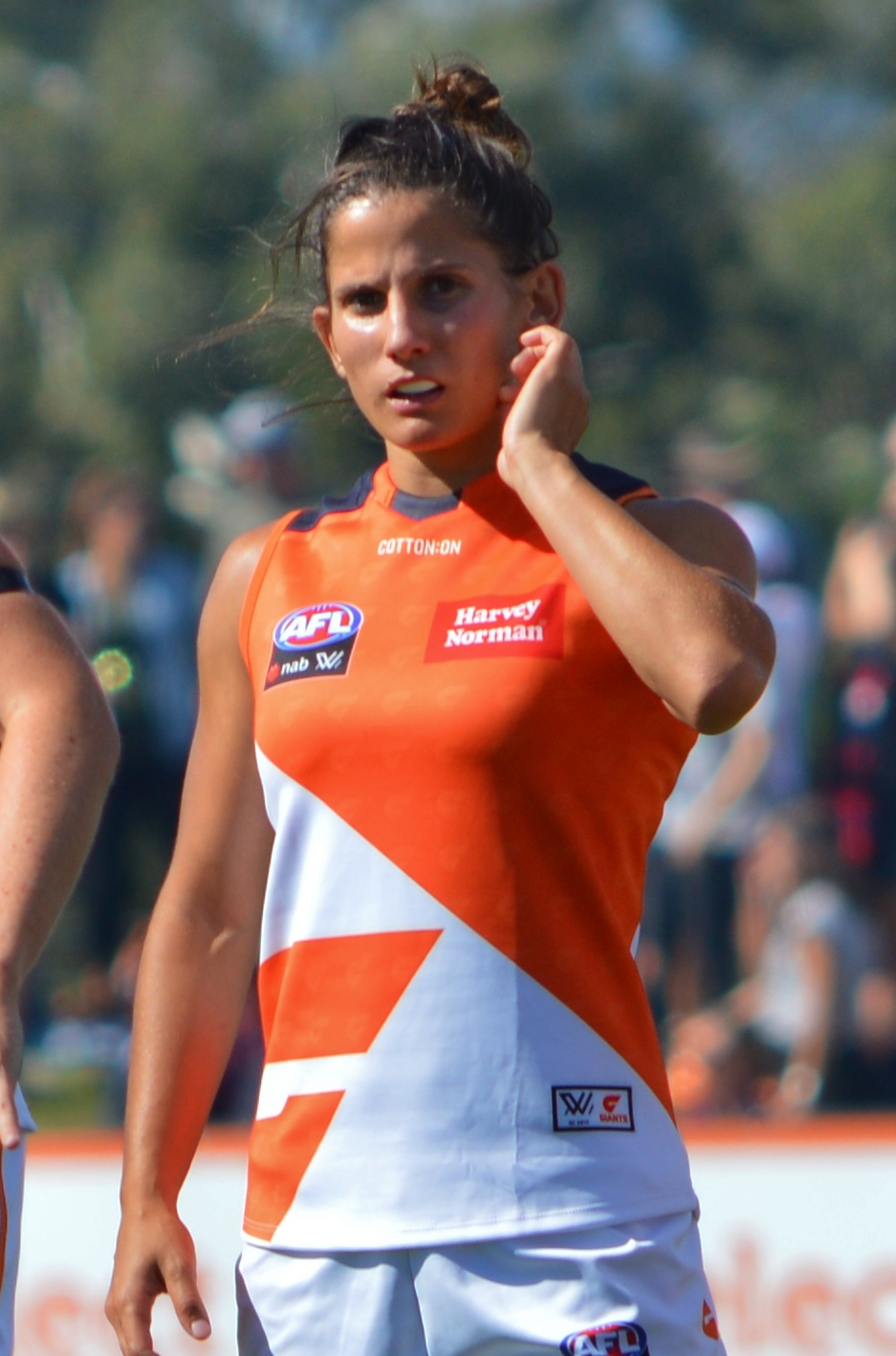
- Dal Pos playing for Greater Western Sydney in 2018

Personal information
- Full name: Jessica Dal Pos
- Born: 20 September 1993 (age 33)
- Original team: Darebin Falcons (VWFL)
- Draft: Priority selection, 2016: Greater Western Sydney
- Debut: Round 1, 2017, Greater Western Sydney vs. Adelaide, at Thebarton Oval
- Height: 160 cm (5 ft 3 in)
- Position: Midfield

Club information
- Current club: Carlton
- Number: 2

Playing career^{1}
Years	Club	Games (Goals)
2017–2021	Greater Western Sydney	37 (5)
2022–2024	Carlton	33 (4)
Total		70 (9)

Representative team honours^{2}
Years	Team	Games (Goals)
2017	Victoria	1 (0)
- ^{1} Playing statistics correct to the end of the 2021 season.^{2} Representative statistics correct as of 2017.

Career highlights
- All-Australian team: 2017; Gabrielle Trainor Medal: 2017

Jessica Dal Pos (born 20 September 1993) is an Australian rules footballer who played for the Carlton Football Club in the AFL Women's (AFLW). She previously played for the Greater Western Sydney Giants from 2017 to 2021, having been one of their four priority selections prior to the 2016 AFL Women's draft.

== Junior and state league ==
Her parents considered Dal Pos too small to play against the boys in under-12 football, and there was no local team for girls. She returned to football in the girls' and women's teams of the Darebin Falcons at 15, and went on to play in four Victorian Women's Football League premierships.

After playing for Western Bulldogs in the first Women's AFL exhibition game in 2013, Dal Pos was delisted. Recognizing improvement in her football over the following two years, Melbourne selected Dal Pos for the AFL exhibition series during 2015.

Prior to the 2016 AFL Women's draft, Dal Pos approached Greater Western Sydney, chose to move to Sydney from Melbourne, and negotiated selection as a priority pick.

== AFL Women's career ==
Dal Pos finished the 2017 season with the second most tackles and centre clearances, and the third most clearances in the league. As well as finishing third for the 2017 AFLW Players' Most Courageous Award, Dal Pos was listed in the 2017 All-Australian team. She was awarded the Gabrielle Trainor Medal as Greater Western Sydney best and fairest.

Greater Western Sydney signed Dal Pos for the 2018 season during the trade period in May 2017.

It was revealed that Dal Pos was looking to leave the Giants in May 2021 because she wanted to move to Victoria to finish a paramedics course. The following month she was traded to Carlton.

Dal Pos became a playing coach at Carlton in 2024 to strengthen the connection between players and coaches.

In 2024 Jess Dal Pos bid farewell to the game following 70 games across all nine seasons, having been an inagugral player in the competition.

== Statistics ==
Statistics are correct to the end of the 2024 season

Legend
G	Goals	K	Kicks	D	Disposals	T	Tackles
B	Behinds	H	Handballs	M	Marks

Season	Team	No.	Games	Totals							Averages (per game)						
Season	Team	No.	Games	G	B	K	H	D	M	T	G	B	K	H	D	M	T
2017	Greater Western Sydney	7	8	1	0	79	18	97	14	49	0.1	0.0	11.3	2.6	13.9	2.0	7.0
2018	Greater Western Sydney	7	7	1	0	52	25	77	10	36	0.1	0.0	7.4	3.6	11.0	1.4	5.1
2019	Greater Western Sydney	7	7	1	1	53	29	82	12	21	0.1	0.1	7.6	4.1	11.7	1.7	3.0
2020	Greater Western Sydney	7	7	1	0	47	22	69	15	8	0.1	0.0	6.7	3.1	9.9	2.1	1.1
2021	Greater Western Sydney	7	9	1	2	51	28	79	10	12	0.1	0.2	5.7	3.1	8.8	1.1	1.3
2022 (S6)	Carlton	2	10	0	0	40	40	80	19	26	0.0	0.0	4.0	4.0	8.0	1.9	2.6
2022 (S7)	Carlton	2	10	2	0	51	22	73	15	44	0.2	0.0	5.1	2.2	7.3	1.5	4.4
2023	Carlton	2	7	1	0	41	32	73	11	25	0.1	0.0	5.9	4.6	10.4	1.6	3.6
2024	Carlton	2	6	1	1	27	18	45	6	20	0.1	0.1	4.5	3.0	7.5	1.0	3.3
Career			70	9	4	441	234	675	112	241	0.1	0.1	6.3	3.3	9.6	1.6	3.4
