= AFL Women's best and fairest =

- Awarded for: The best and fairest player in the AFL Women's
- Location: Crown Melbourne
- Country: Australia
- Presented by: AFLW
- First award: 2017
- Currently held by: Ash Riddell (North Melbourne)
- Website: Best & Fairest Trophy

The AFL Women's best and fairest is awarded to the best and fairest player in the AFL Women's (AFLW) during the home-and-away season, as determined by votes cast by the officiating field umpires after each game. It is the most prestigious award for individual players in the AFLW. It is also widely acknowledged as the highest individual honour in women's Australian rules football.

== Criteria ==
=== Voting procedure ===
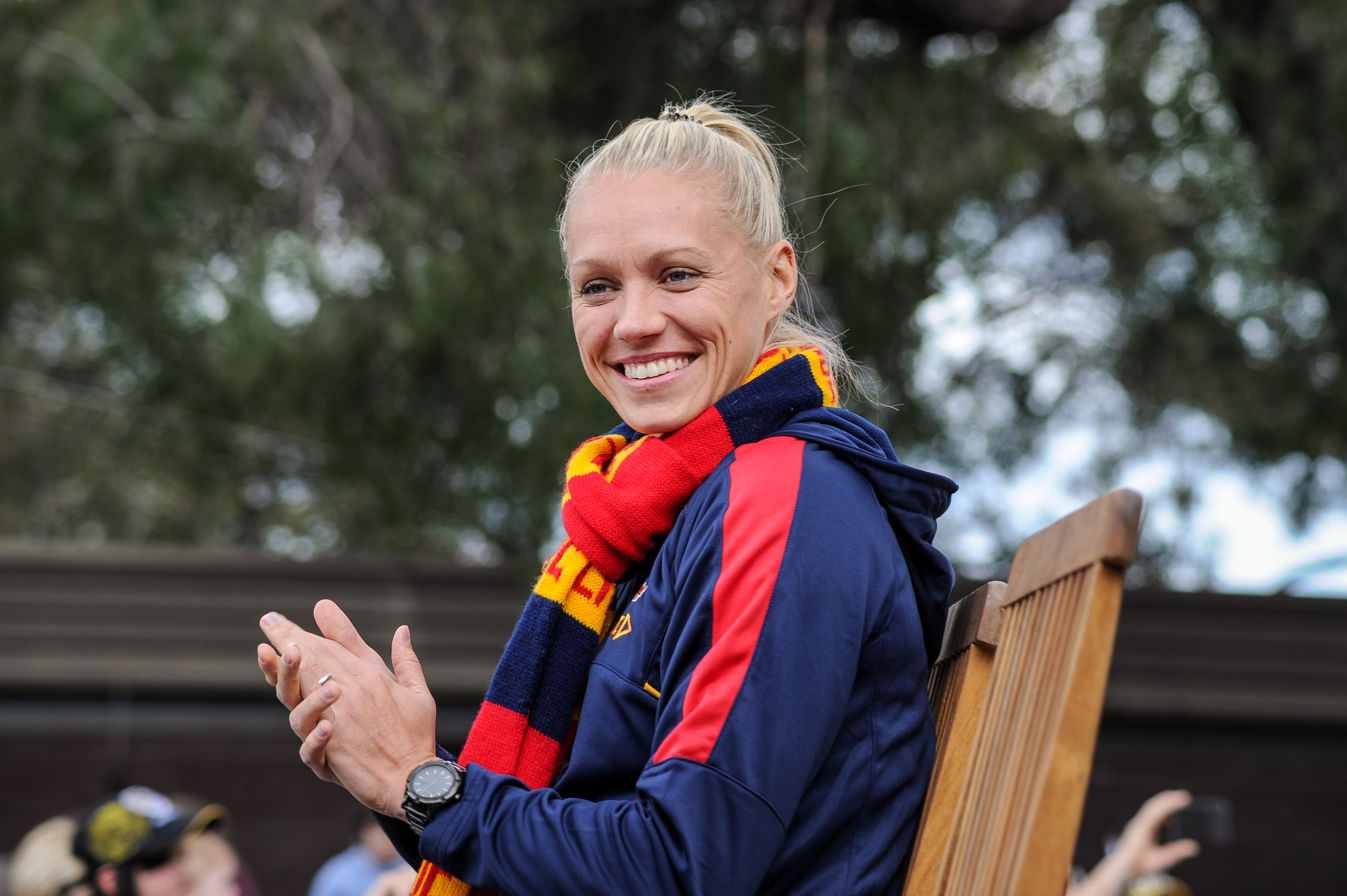
Erin Phillips was the inaugural winner of the award in 2017, and won it again in 2019.

To determine the best player, the three field umpires (not the goal umpires or boundary umpires) confer after each home-and-away match and award three votes, two votes and one vote to the players they regard as the best, second-best and third-best in the match, respectively. On the awards night, the votes from each match are tallied, and the player or players with the highest number of votes is awarded the trophy (subject to eligibility – see below).

The current voting system, which is the same as that of the Australian Football League (AFL)'s Brownlow Medal, has been used since the award's inception. If two or more eligible players score the equal highest number of votes, each wins a trophy.

=== Ineligibility ===
The fairest component of the trophy is achieved by making ineligible any player who is suspended by the AFL Tribunal during the home-and-away season. An ineligible player cannot win the award, regardless of the number of votes she has received.

A player remains eligible for the award under the following circumstances:

- she is suspended during the finals or pre-season;
- she serves a suspension in the current season which carried on from, or was earned for an offence committed in, the previous season;
- she receives any sort of club-imposed suspension which is not recognised by the AFL Tribunal;
- she is found guilty by the AFL Tribunal of an offence which attracts only a financial penalty.

Umpires cast their votes for each game independent of eligibility criteria of the players; i.e. umpires can cast votes for players who have already been suspended during that season if they perceive them to be amongst the best on the ground.

== Award ceremony ==
The AFL Women's best and fairest is awarded during the W Awards, the official AFL Women's awards ceremony.

== Records ==
Most medals by player

- 2 – Erin Phillips

Most medals by club

- 3 – Adelaide (2017, 2019, 2024)

Most votes in a season

- 23 – Monique Conti (Richmond, 2023), Ebony Marinoff (Adelaide, 2024), Ash Riddell (North Melbourne, 2025)

Youngest winner

- Maddy Prespakis (Carlton, 2020) – 19 years, 179 days

Oldest winner

- Erin Phillips (Adelaide, 2019) – 33 years, 317 days

Winners who also won a premiership in same season

- Erin Phillips (Adelaide, 2017, 2019)
- Emma Kearney (Western Bulldogs, 2018)
- Ash Riddell (North Melbourne), 2025

== See also ==
- Brownlow Medal
