= List of AFL Women's premiership captains and coaches =

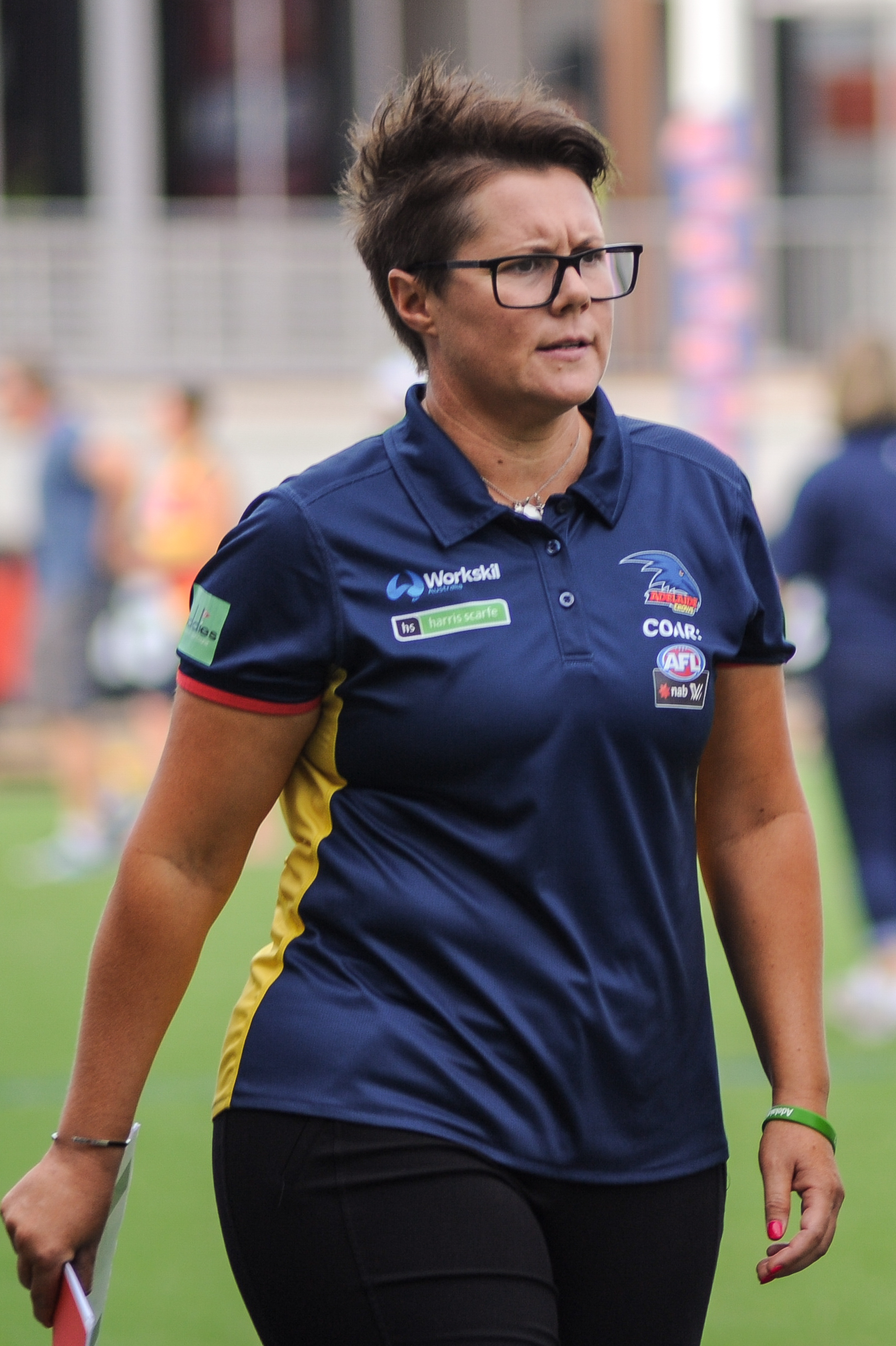
Bec Goddard was the inaugural premiership coach in 2017.

This is a list of captains and coaches of AFL Women's premiership teams. Matthew Clarke and Craig Starcevich are the only multiple premiership coaches, with two wins each. Adelaide's Chelsea Randall holds the record for most premiership captaincies with three (2017, 2019 and 2022 (S6)). For the former two wins, she was co-captain with Erin Phillips.

Year	Premiers	Captain	Coach
2017	Adelaide	Chelsea Randall	Bec Goddard
2017	Adelaide	Erin Phillips	Bec Goddard
2018	Western Bulldogs	Ellie Blackburn	Paul Groves
2019	Adelaide	Chelsea Randall	Matthew Clarke
2019	Adelaide	Erin Phillips	Matthew Clarke
2021	Brisbane	Emma Zielke	Craig Starcevich
2022 (S6)	Adelaide	Chelsea Randall	Matthew Clarke
2022 (S7)	Melbourne	Daisy Pearce	Mick Stinear
2023	Brisbane	Breanna Koenen	Craig Starcevich
2024	North Melbourne	Emma Kearney	Darren Crocker

== See also ==
- List of VFL/AFL premiership captains and coaches
