= Daisy Pearce =

Australian rules footballer (born 1988)

- Pearce post-match with West Coast in 2026

Personal information
- Born: 27 May 1988 (age 38); Bright, Victoria, Australia (Note: Sources differ regarding Pearce's birthplace; her profile on the former VWFL website lists her birthplace as Bright, while a book by Samantha Lane states that she was born in nearby Wandiligong.)
- Original team: Darebin (VFLW)
- Draft: 2016 marquee signing
- Debut: Round 1, 2017, Melbourne vs. Brisbane, at Casey Fields
- Height: 170 cm (5 ft 7 in)
- Position: Midfielder / forward

Playing career
Years	Club	Games (Goals)
2017–2022 (S7)	Melbourne	55 (25)

Representative team honours
Years	Team	Games (Goals)
2017	Victoria	1 (1)

International team honours
2006	Australia	

Coaching career^{3}
Years	Club	Games (W–L–D)
2024–	West Coast (W)	31 (13–18–0)
- ^{3} Coaching statistics correct as of round 7, 2026.

Career highlights
- Australian Football Hall of Fame (inducted 2025); AFLW: AFL Women's premiership player: S7 (c); Melbourne captain: 2017–2018, 2020–2022 (S7); 3× AFL Women's All-Australian team: 2017 (c), 2018, S6; 3× Melbourne best and fairest: (Note: Later named the Daisy Pearce Trophy in her honour) 2017, 2018, S6; 4× AFLPA AFLW best captain: 2017, 2018, 2020, S6; AFLW State of Origin best-on-ground: 2017; VWFL/VFLW: 10× VWFL/VFLW premiership player: 2006, 2007, 2008 (c), 2009 (c), 2010 (c), 2013 (c), 2014 (c), 2015 (c), 2016 (c), 2017; Darebin captain: 2008–2016; 6× Helen Lambert Medal: 2009, 2010, 2011, 2013, 2014, 2015; VFL Women's best and fairest: (Note: Later named the Lambert–Pearce Medal partly in her honour) 2016; 2× Lisa Hardeman Medal: 2005, 2014; 5× Darebin best and fairest: 2005, 2009, 2010, 2011, 2012

Daisy Pearce (born 27 May 1988) is an Australian rules football coach, media personality and former player. Pearce played for the Melbourne Football Club in the AFL Women's (AFLW) from 2017 to season 7 (Note: Pearce missed the 2019 season due to pregnancy) and is the current AFLW senior coach of the West Coast Eagles. Often regarded as a pioneer of women's Australian rules football and the face of the AFLW, she was the first player to return to playing at AFLW level after giving birth, eventually playing for four more seasons in a variety of positions, and was inducted into the Australian Football Hall of Fame in 2025.

Pearce began her playing career with the Darebin Falcons in the Victorian Women's Football League (VWFL) and VFL Women's (VFLW), playing from 2005 to 2017 and captaining the club from 2008 to 2016. She is a ten-time premiership player (seven as captain), two-time Lisa Hardeman Medallist as best afield in the grand final, seven-time league best and fairest winner and five-time Darebin best and fairest winner; the VFL Women's best and fairest award, of which Pearce was the inaugural recipient in 2016, was also named partly in her honour in 2018. Pearce was recruited by Melbourne with the first selection in the inaugural national women's draft in 2013 and captained the club in the women's exhibition games staged prior to the 2016 creation of the AFL Women's.

Pearce was a marquee signing for Melbourne's AFLW team leading into the competition's first season in 2017, and captained the club in all six seasons that she played. At AFLW level, Pearce is a three-time AFL Women's All-Australian (including as captain in 2017 and vice-captain in 2018) and led Melbourne to its first AFL Women's premiership in season 7. She captained Victoria in a one-off AFLW State of Origin match in 2017, where she was adjudged best afield, and is a four-time AFLPA AFLW best captain and three-time Melbourne best and fairest winner, with the latter named in her honour in 2023.

Following her playing retirement, Pearce transitioned into coaching. She was as a development coach with the Geelong Football Club's Australian Football League (AFL) team in 2023, and has served as West Coast's AFLW senior coach since 2024, coaching the club to its first AFLW finals appearance in 2025.

Outside of her playing and coaching careers, Pearce became an established media personality in both television and radio. Pearce has been an expert commentator for the Seven Network and 1116 SEN's AFL coverages, including Seven's coverage of four AFL grand finals; she was the boundary rider for the 2018 and 2019 grand finals and provided special comments for the 2021 and 2022 grand finals, becoming the first woman to provide special comments for an AFL grand final for Seven and earning an Australian Football Media Association (AFMA) award for her performance in 2021. Pearce appeared as a panel member on the Seven program AFL Game Day from 2016 until its cancellation in 2020 and hosted her own podcast on SEN, This is Grit, in 2019.

== Early life ==
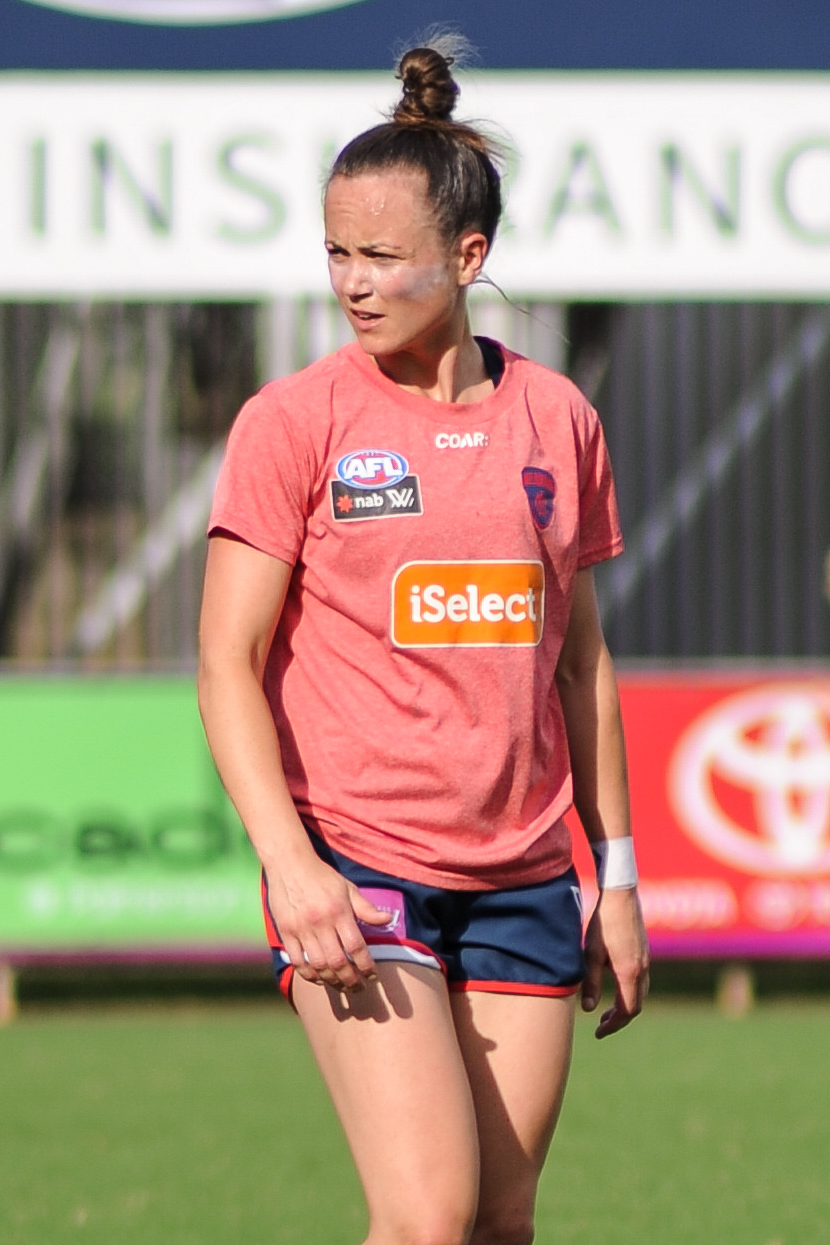
Pearce pre-match with Melbourne in 2017

Daisy Pearce was born on 27 May 1988 in Bright, Victoria, to parents Daryl and Dee. She has two brothers, along with an older half-brother through her father and two younger half-siblings through her mother. Pearce's parents separated in 1995; Daisy remained with her father in Wandiligong, near Bright, where she attended Bright P-12 College, while her mother and the rest of the family relocated to Eltham, in Melbourne's north-east. When Pearce was a teenager, she moved to live with her mother in Eltham and attended Eltham High School.

As a child, Pearce supported the Carlton Football Club, and one of her favourite players was Carlton premiership player and former captain Brett Ratten. She was enrolled in the Vickick program, which later became Auskick, and played junior football alongside boys as a child. Her father was a coach at the Bright Football Club, which allowed Pearce to begin training with the under-13 boys team from the age of eight; she played alongside her brother Harry and future Collingwood premiership defender Ben Reid. Pearce needed dispensation from the local league to continue playing alongside boys as a teenager, but was disallowed, which played a part in her decision to move to Eltham. At high school, she took up netball, tennis and volleyball, making a national youth squad for the latter, before eventually picking up football again.

== Early playing career ==
=== State league and representative football ===
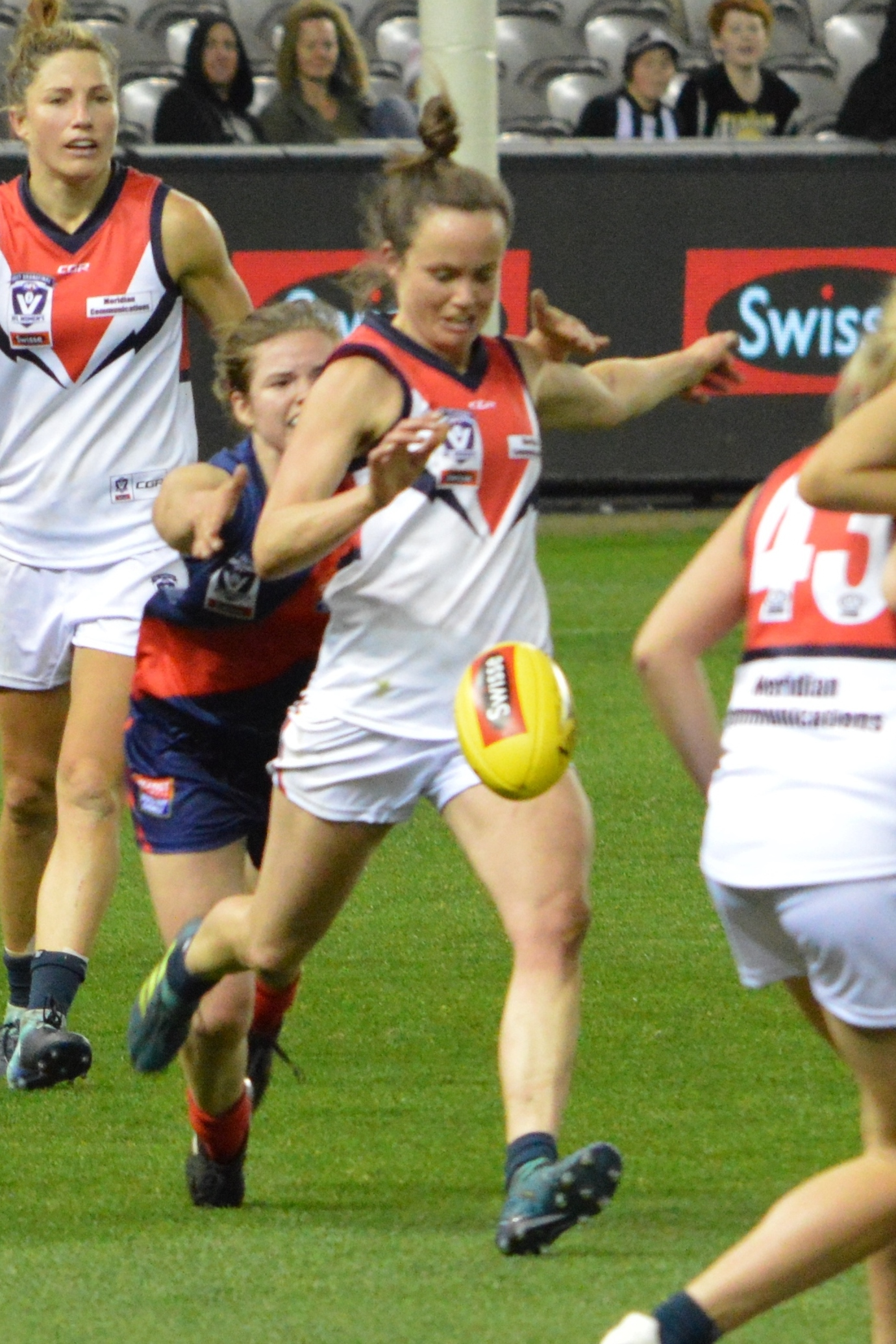
Pearce (centre) kicking the ball during the 2017 VFL Women's Grand Final

Pearce began playing with Darebin in the premier division of the Victorian Women's Football League (VWFL) in 2005 at the age of 16, winning the Lisa Hardeman Medal in her first season and going on to play an estimated 200 matches for the women-only football club. In 2007, Darebin went through the VWFL season undefeated, defeating Melbourne University in the grand final, and Pearce was named among the best players in the grand final. Darebin would go on to win five VWFL premierships in a row, before losing to St Albans in the grand final in 2011; Pearce, who had by then become captain, was named Darebin's best player in the loss. In 2013 and 2014, Darebin went through both seasons undefeated, defeating Diamond Creek by 49 points in the 2013 grand final and 30 points in the 2014 grand final; Pearce was best afield in the latter. She featured in Darebin's third consecutive grand final win over Diamond Creek in 2015. During her career in the VWFL, Pearce won the Darebin best and fairest award five times and the Helen Lambert Medal as the VWFL's best and fairest player six times.

Pearce was a member of the Australian team that played against Ireland in the 2006 Ladies' International Rules Series which, as of 2016, remains the only women's series to have taken place. Pearce was selected after performing well at the 2006 AFL Women's National Championships and, at the age of 18, was the youngest player in the squad; the trip to Ireland was largely self-funded, with Pearce raising funds by selling boxes of Freddo Frogs. In June 2007, at the age of 19, she was one of two VWFL representatives, alongside Shannon McFerran, named to play in the E. J. Whitten Legends Game; Pearce was named in the Victorian team while McFerran was named for the All Stars, marking the first time female players were included in the annual charity match. Pearce captained the Victoria under-19 team at the 2007 AFL Women's National Championships; she was named in the championships' All-Australian team and won the award for joint-player of the tournament. Pearce was named in the leadership group for the Victorian senior team at the 2009 championships and was again named in the championships' All-Australian team. She was named deputy vice-captain for Victoria at the 2011 championships.

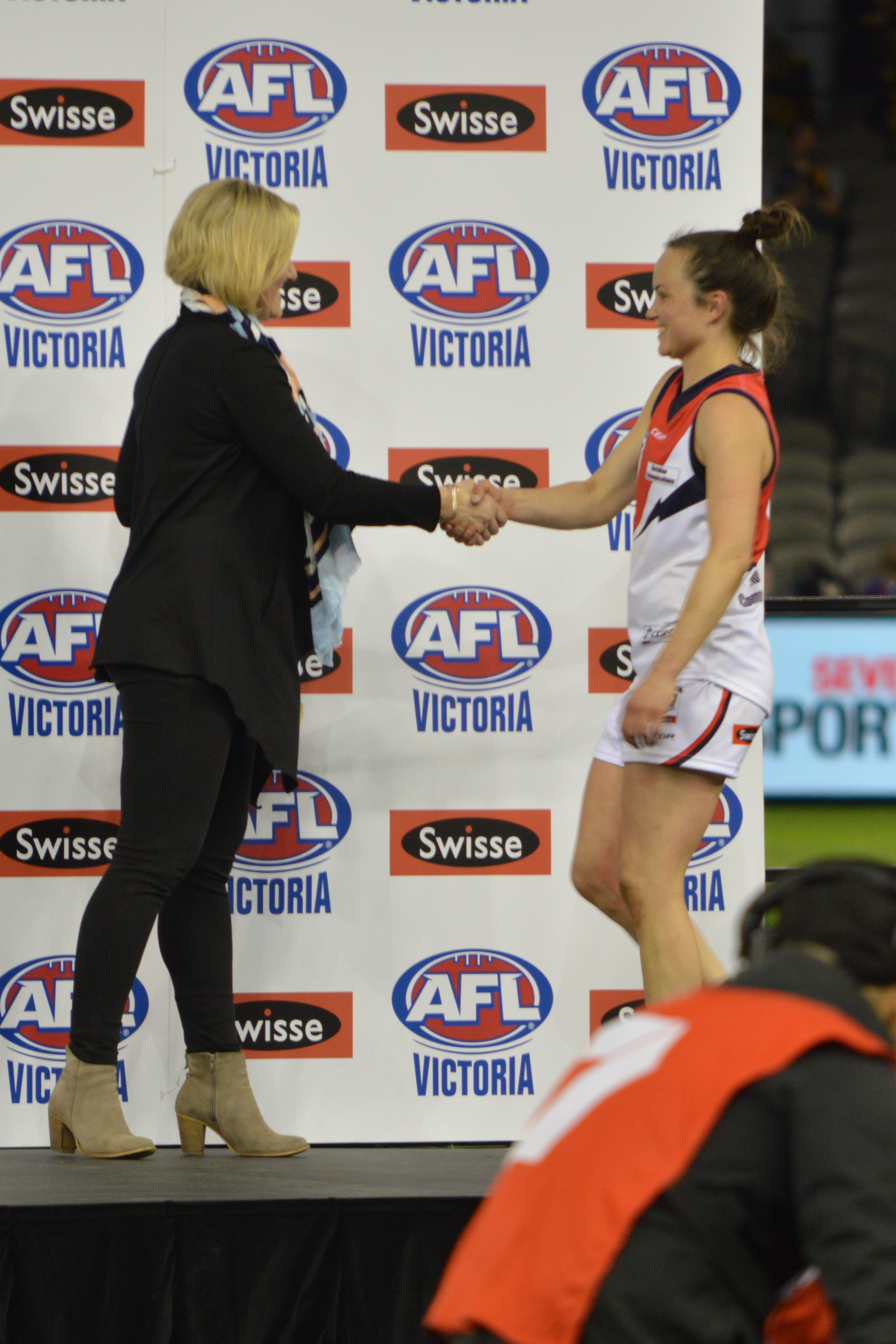
Pearce receiving her premiership medallion following the 2017 VFL Women's Grand Final

In March 2016, the VFL Women's (VFLW) was launched and Darebin was named among ten teams from the VWFL to participate in Victoria's new state league competition. Pearce won the inaugural VFL Women's best and fairest award and played in the first VFLW premiership in 2016 as Darebin defeated Melbourne University. She played in Darebin's grand final win over Diamond Creek in 2017, kicking a goal and receiving praise from coach Jane Lange for her leadership and commitment as Darebin won its fifth consecutive state league premiership and tenth in twelve seasons.

=== Women's exhibition games ===
In May 2013, the Australian Football League (AFL) announced that a women's exhibition game would be held for the first time during its annual Women's Round, involving AFL clubs Melbourne and the Western Bulldogs. Fifty of the top female footballers in Australia were selected in the inaugural national women's draft later that month to play for the two clubs at the Melbourne Cricket Ground (MCG) in a curtain raiser to the AFL match between the clubs in June; Pearce was recruited by Melbourne with the first selection in the draft, and was later named as Melbourne's captain. She was adjudged best afield with 28 disposals in the first exhibition game, which Melbourne won by 32 points in front of a crowd of almost 8,000. A second exhibition game between the two clubs, again played as a curtain raiser to the men's match and this time at Etihad Stadium, was announced in June 2014; Pearce was named among Melbourne's best players in its 46-point win.

In February 2015, the AFL announced that two women's exhibition games would be played that year between Melbourne and the Western Bulldogs, the first to be played at the MCG in May and the second to be played at Etihad Stadium in August. Pearce was named among Melbourne's best players with 23 disposals in the first match, which Melbourne won by eight points, and was best afield with 30 disposals in the second match, which Melbourne won by four points. Later that year, she was named as the inaugural winner of the club's best female player award, polling five out of a possible six votes from the two matches. In February 2016, the AFL announced a ten-match national exhibition series to be played throughout the year, in which Melbourne played two games against the Western Bulldogs in March and September, as well as a match against a Brisbane Lions women's team at the MCG in May. Pearce was best afield with 33 disposals and eleven marks in the first match, which Melbourne lost by 20 points, and was named among Melbourne's best players in its 71-point win over Brisbane. She was Melbourne's best player in its 39-point loss to the Bulldogs in September; the match was watched by an average audience of 387,000 people in Melbourne, which was greater than the average viewing audience for every Saturday night game during the 2016 AFL home-and-away season, as well as a national audience peak of over one million people.

== AFL Women's playing career ==
=== 2017–2019: Midfield seasons and pregnancy ===
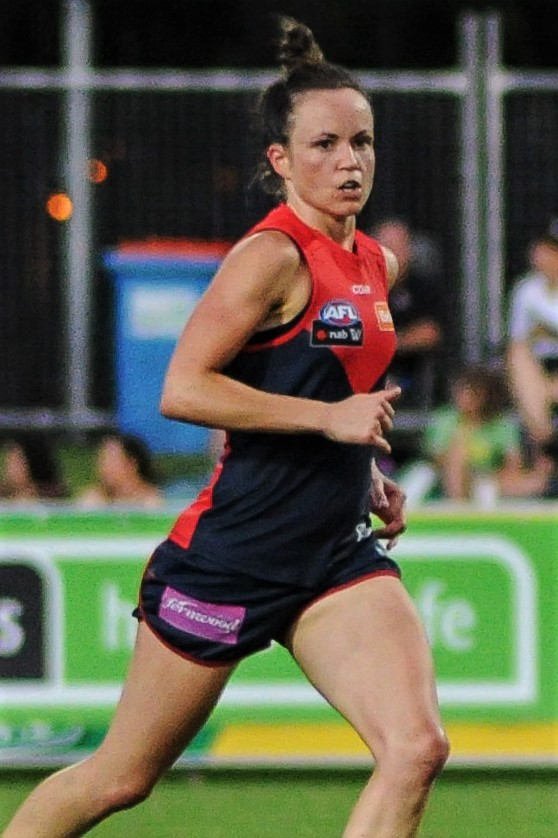
Pearce playing for Melbourne in 2017

In July 2016, Pearce and Melissa Hickey were announced as Melbourne's two marquee players for the inaugural AFL Women's season in 2017. Pearce was announced as the club's first AFLW captain in January 2017. She made her AFL Women's debut in Melbourne's inaugural match in round 1 against Brisbane at the club's home ground, Casey Fields, and was listed among her team's best players in the loss, recording 19 disposals and nine tackles. Pearce was among Melbourne's best players in every game for the season; she was named by the AFL Players Association (AFLPA) as "Player of the Week" for round 4 after recording 29 disposals and six tackles in Melbourne's win against Carlton and was awarded the maximum three votes for the AFL Women's best and fairest award in Melbourne's round 6 match against Adelaide. Following the home-and-away season, she revealed that she played the first two rounds with an injury after sustaining bone bruising and a corked calf in the opening round, and had sat out training for the entire week leading into round 2. At the end of the season, Pearce was named captain of the 2017 AFL Women's All-Australian team. She won the inaugural Melbourne best and fairest award and AFLPA AFLW best captain award, and was one of three Melbourne players nominated by her teammates for the AFLPA AFLW most valuable player award. She averaged 21.9 disposals, the most of any player in the inaugural season. Melbourne re-signed Pearce for the 2018 season during the trade and signing period in May. She then captained Victoria in the inaugural AFL Women's State of Origin match on 2 September in front of a crowd of 9,400, where she was adjudged best afield with 37 disposals in the 97-point win.

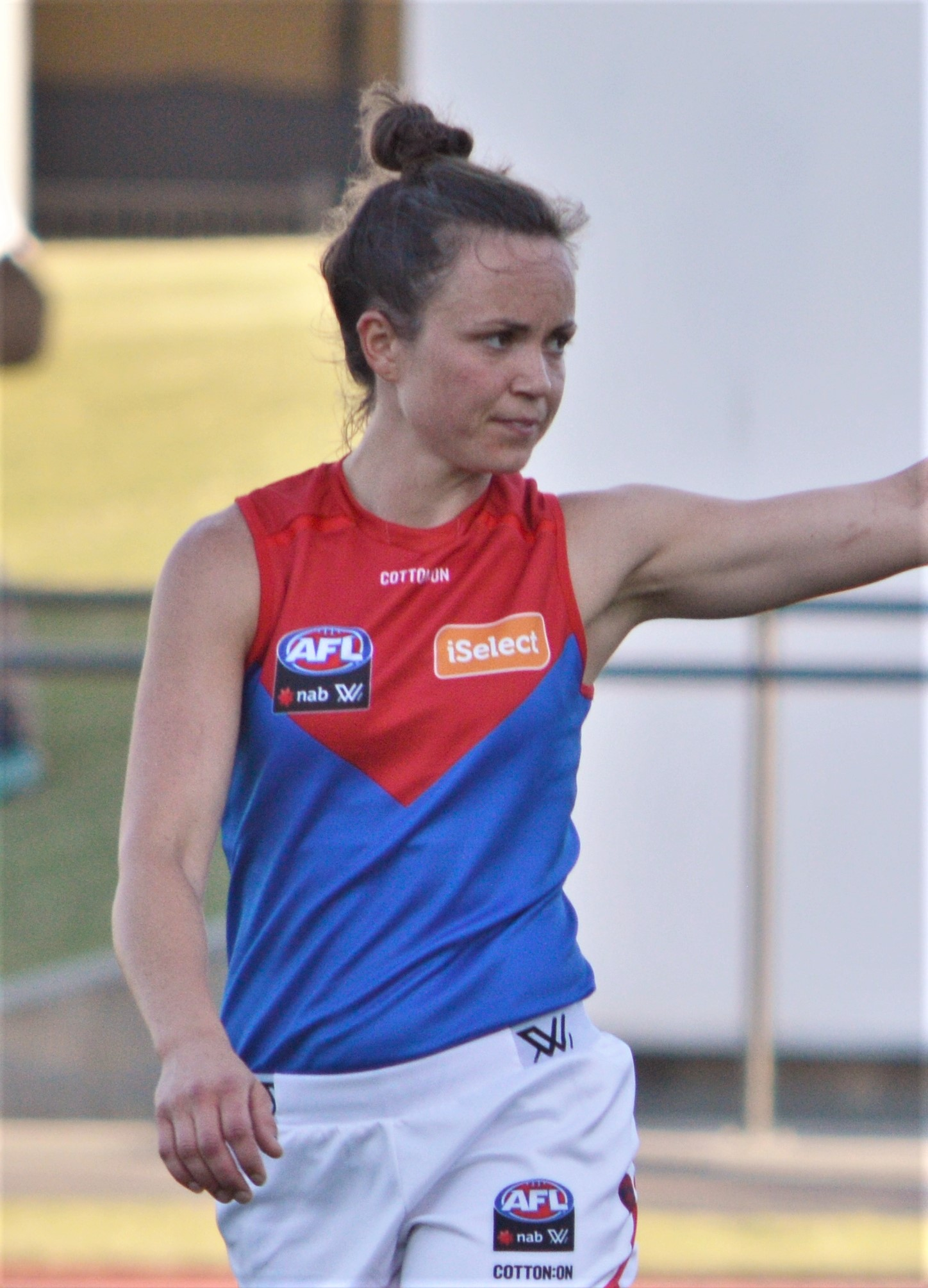
Pearce during a pre-season practice match with Melbourne in 2018

In January 2018, Pearce was re-elected as Melbourne captain. She was among Melbourne's best players in four of its first five matches of the season, polling the maximum three AFL Women's best and fairest votes in Melbourne's loss to Fremantle in round 3. Pearce polled a game-high nine votes for the AFL Coaches Association (AFLCA) AFLW champion player of the year award in rounds 1 and 3 and the maximum ten votes in round 5, and was selected in afl.com.au's Team of the Week in the same rounds. At the end of the season, Pearce was named vice-captain of the 2018 AFL Women's All-Australian team, and again won the Melbourne best and fairest award and AFLPA AFLW best captain award. She was again nominated by her teammates for the AFLPA AFLW most valuable player award. Melbourne signed Pearce for the 2019 season during the trade and signing period in May. However, on 31 August, Pearce announced her pregnancy with twins, which would result in her missing the 2019 season; she was retained as an inactive player, and Elise O'Dea and Shelley Scott were eventually announced as co-captains in her place.

Pearce continued to mentor and work with Melbourne players in an unofficial assistant coach role when they returned for pre-season training in November 2018, and gave birth to twins in February 2019. By April, she was back to her playing weight, and later that month, she re-signed with Melbourne for the 2020 season. In July 2019, Pearce returned to the club to train three days a week as part of what she called her "pre-pre-pre-season" for 2020, adding that she was surprised by how her body had responded after her twins' birth, and resumed training with her Melbourne teammates three weeks later. In August, Pearce was announced as an assistant coach to Dermott Brereton for the Victorian team in that year's E.J. Whitten Legends Game.

=== 2020–2021: Return to football and position shifts ===
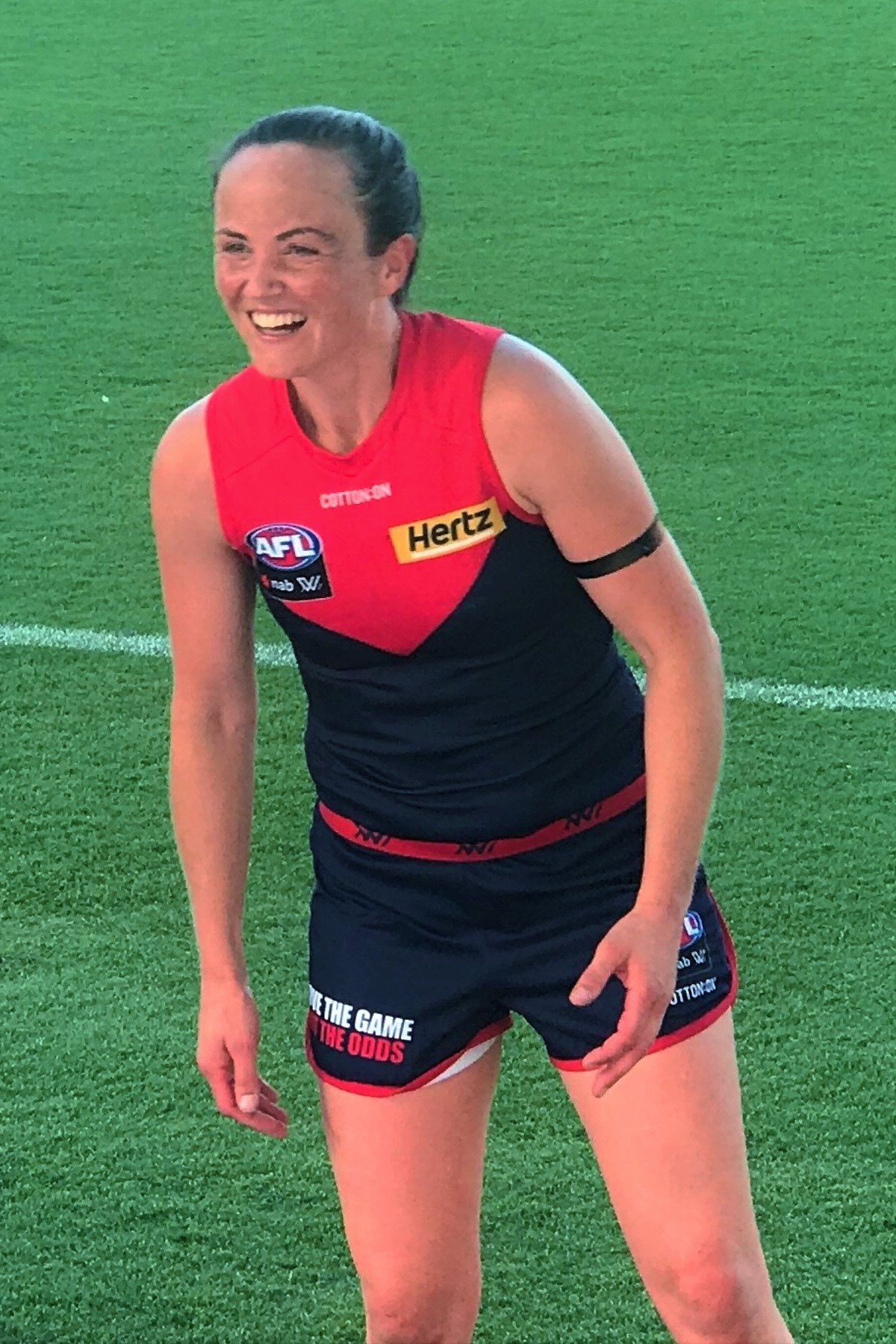
Pearce post-match with Melbourne in 2021

Pearce was reinstated as Melbourne captain in January 2020. Coach Mick Stinear said, "With her knowledge of our game plan, and her ability to instruct, support and give feedback on and off the field, she's just the ideal person to lead this group". She ran a personal best time over two kilometres in the lead-up to the season. Later that month, Pearce made a successful return to football, playing the first three quarters of Melbourne's practice match win against Collingwood. Leading into the season, womens.afl journalist Sarah Black named Pearce at no. 5 on her list of the top 30 players in the AFLW. Pearce played her first AFLW match in 694 days in Melbourne's win over North Melbourne in round 1, playing in a new role as a defender; in doing so, she became the first player to return to playing at AFLW level after giving birth. Pearce was named among Melbourne's best players in five of its six home-and-away matches for the season; she polled eight coaches' votes in round 2 and five in round 3, and was selected in womens.afl's Team of the Week for round 2. After round 6, the last two home-and-away rounds were abandoned and a modified finals series was brought forward due to the impact of the COVID-19 pandemic, allowing Melbourne to qualify for finals for the first time. Pearce was among Melbourne's best players with 22 disposals in its semi-final win over Greater Western Sydney, before the finals were cancelled with no premiership awarded due to the pandemic. Pearce was selected in the initial 40-woman squad for the 2020 AFL Women's All-Australian team, and was voted as the AFLPA AFLW best captain and nominated by her teammates for the AFLPA AFLW most valuable player award for the third time.

Leading into the 2021 season, Pearce was named as Melbourne captain for a fourth season, and was named by Sarah Black at no. 9 on her annual list of the top 30 players in the AFLW. Prior to the opening game of the season, Pearce said that she had been "squeezed out of the midfield, officially" and would continue to primarily play at half-back while still making small appearances in the midfield. Pearce polled the maximum three AFL Women's best and fairest votes in Melbourne's round 1 win against Gold Coast. She was named among Melbourne's best players in its win over St Kilda in round 6 after moving to the forward line and kicking two goals, and was selected in womens.afl's Team of the Week for that round. Pearce was named among Melbourne's best players in round 8 after kicking a goal and setting up the match-winning goal in the club's close win over Fremantle, which assured its position in that year's finals series. She injured the medial collateral ligament (MCL) in her right knee in the opening minutes of Melbourne's close win over Brisbane the following week after her leg was caught underneath her in a tackle, which ruled her out of Melbourne's qualifying final win against Fremantle and preliminary final loss to Adelaide. Following the preliminary final, Pearce placed second in that year's AFLPA AFLW best captain award behind Western Bulldogs captain Ellie Blackburn; she revealed the next day that she had suffered a small tear to the anterior cruciate ligament (ACL) in her right knee in the round 9 game, and that she would have surgery to repair the MCL while allowing the ACL to heal naturally.

=== 2022: 13-goal season, premiership and retirement ===
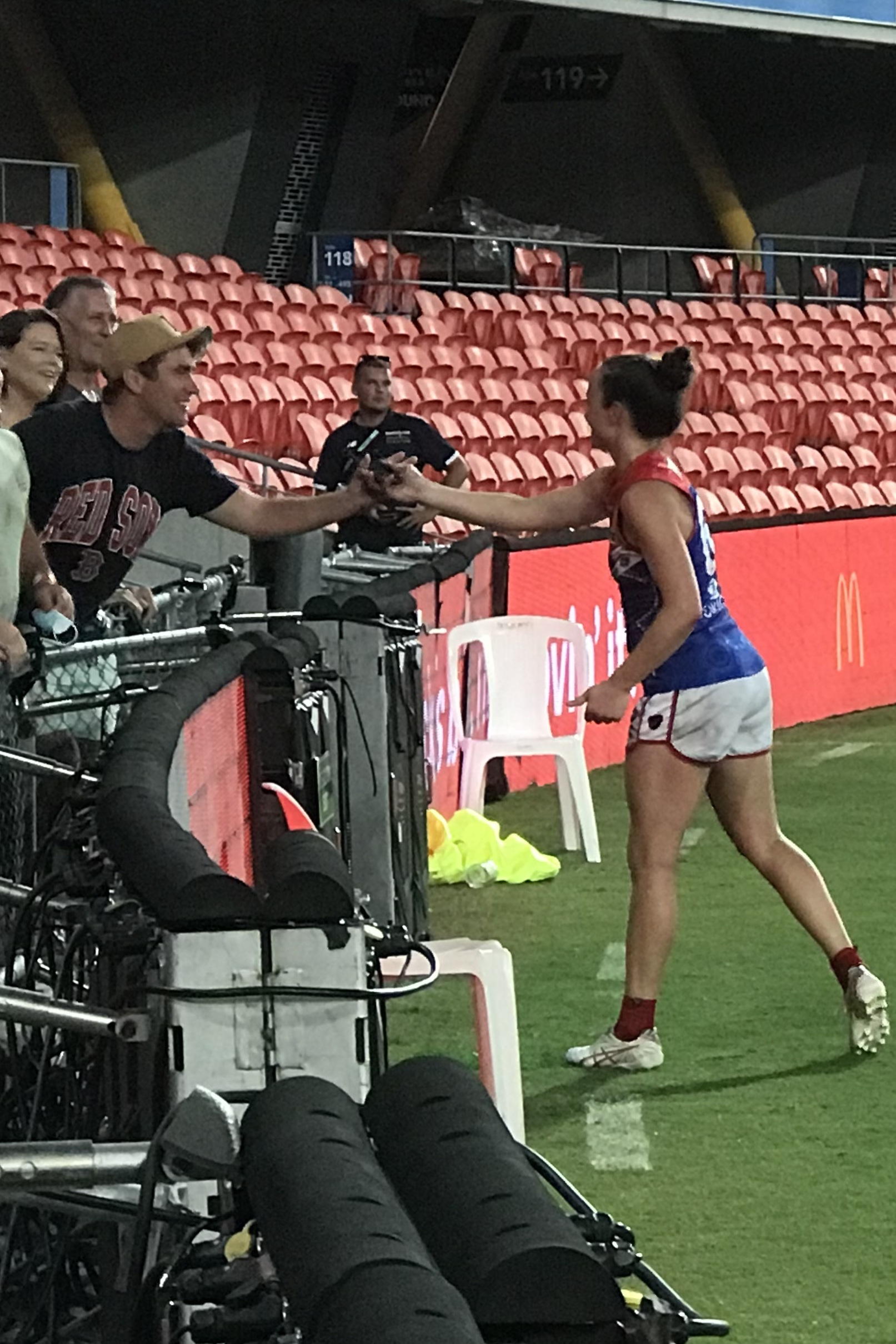
Pearce post-match with Melbourne in 2022

Pearce was named as Melbourne captain for a fifth season leading into season 6, continuing in her forward role from midway through the previous season. Stinear said that she was the strongest he had ever seen her; Pearce said that she had focused more heavily on weights and more of a strength and power focus over running during the pre-season. She polled the maximum three AFL Women's best and fairest votes in Melbourne's round 1 win over the Western Bulldogs and was among Melbourne's best players in its loss to Adelaide in round 4, kicking two of the team's three goals for the game. At the halfway point of the season, Pearce was equal-third in the competition for average score involvements with 4.4 per game. She was among Melbourne's best players in its win over Brisbane in round 7, shifting back into defence during the match to record 15 disposals; she received five coaches' votes and was selected in womens.afl's Team of the Week for round 7. Pearce was among Melbourne's best players with five goals in its record-breaking win over Fremantle in round 9, becoming Melbourne's first AFLW player and the fourth AFLW player overall to kick five goals in a match; she received the maximum ten coaches' votes, was selected in womens.afl's Team of the Week for round 9 and polled the maximum three AFL Women's best and fairest votes. She was among Melbourne's best players in its win over Carlton in round 10, kicking two goals and alternating between attack and defence to help Melbourne secure a top-two finish at the end of the home-and-away season. Pearce played in Melbourne's preliminary final win over Brisbane in the first AFLW match played at the MCG to help the club progress to the 2022 AFL Women's season 6 Grand Final, its first grand final appearance. She was named in Champion Data's 2022 AFLW All-Star stats team after leading the competition for score involvements with 1.5 per game and kicking 13 goals in ten games, was named in the 2022 AFL Women's season 6 All-Australian team, her third All-Australian selection, and was voted as the AFLPA AFLW best captain for the fourth time in her career. Pearce played in Melbourne's loss to Adelaide in the grand final, playing a key role in defence and on the wing. Following the grand final, she won her third Melbourne best and fairest award by a single vote. In May, Pearce said that she would continue playing for "at least one more" season, with the competition's seventh season taking place later in the year.

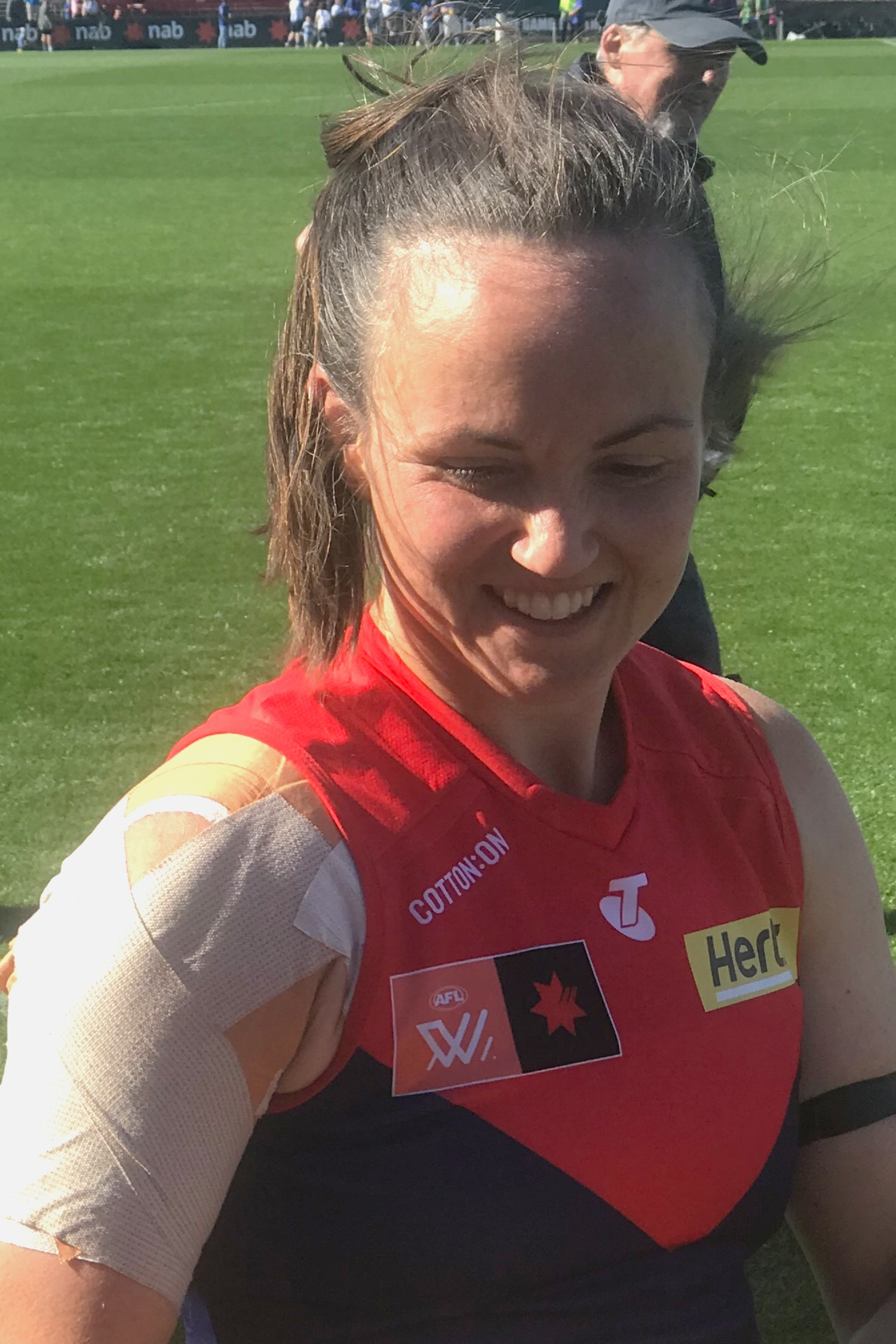
Pearce post-match with Melbourne in 2022

In August, Pearce was named at no. 25 in Sarah Black's season 7 list of the top 30 players in the AFLW and was named as Melbourne captain for a sixth season. She kicked a goal from eight disposals in Melbourne's round 1 win over Adelaide, playing a negating role on Adelaide defender Sarah Allan as part of her role to "keep [Adelaide's] intercept (possession) game to a minimum". Pearce was among Melbourne's best players in its win over North Melbourne in round 2 with two goals. In the lead-up to her 50th AFLW game, Pearce said that while she would "love" an AFLW premiership, "It's less about ticking that box and having a premiership than it is about love for the game [...] I think I'll walk away still really fulfilled and feeling like the game has given me so much". She played her 50th game in Melbourne's win over Gold Coast in round 8, kicking a goal from 11 disposals and six marks. Pearce kicked the winning goal in Melbourne's preliminary final win over North Melbourne to help the club progress to the 2022 AFL Women's season 7 Grand Final, its second consecutive grand final appearance. She played in Melbourne's premiership win over Brisbane the following week, one of five inaugural Melbourne players (the others being Sarah Lampard, Lily Mithen, Karen Paxman and Lauren Pearce; Stinear was also their inaugural coach) to do so. In January 2023, Pearce announced her playing retirement.

=== Playing statistics ===
Legend
G	Goals	K	Kicks	D	Disposals	T	Tackles
B	Behinds	H	Handballs	M	Marks
#	Played in that season's premiership team	†	Led the league for the season

Season	Team	No.	Games	Totals							Averages (per game)							Votes
Season	Team	No.	Games	G	B	K	H	D	M	T	G	B	K	H	D	M	T	Votes
2017	Melbourne	6	7	1	1	79	74^{†}	153	16	36	0.1	0.1	11.3	10.6^{†}	21.9^{†}	2.3	5.1	7
2018	Melbourne	6	7	2	1	89	38	127	11	37	0.3	0.1	12.7	5.4	18.1	1.6	5.3	6
2019	Melbourne	6	0	—	—	—	—	—	—	—	—	—	—	—	—	—	—	0
2020	Melbourne	6	7	0	0	68	36	104	19	20	0.0	0.0	9.7	5.1	14.9	2.7	2.9	2
2021	Melbourne	6	9	3	4	67	22	89	17	25	0.3	0.4	7.4	2.4	9.9	1.9	2.8	3
2022 (S6)	Melbourne	6	12	13	7	93	37	130	27	21	1.1	0.6	7.8	3.1	10.8	2.3	1.8	6
2022 (S7)^{#}	Melbourne	6	13	6	9	75	47	122	25	21	0.5	0.7	5.8	3.6	9.4	1.9	1.6	1
Career			55	25	22	471	254	725	115	160	0.5	0.4	8.6	4.6	13.2	2.1	2.9	25

== Playing style and positions ==
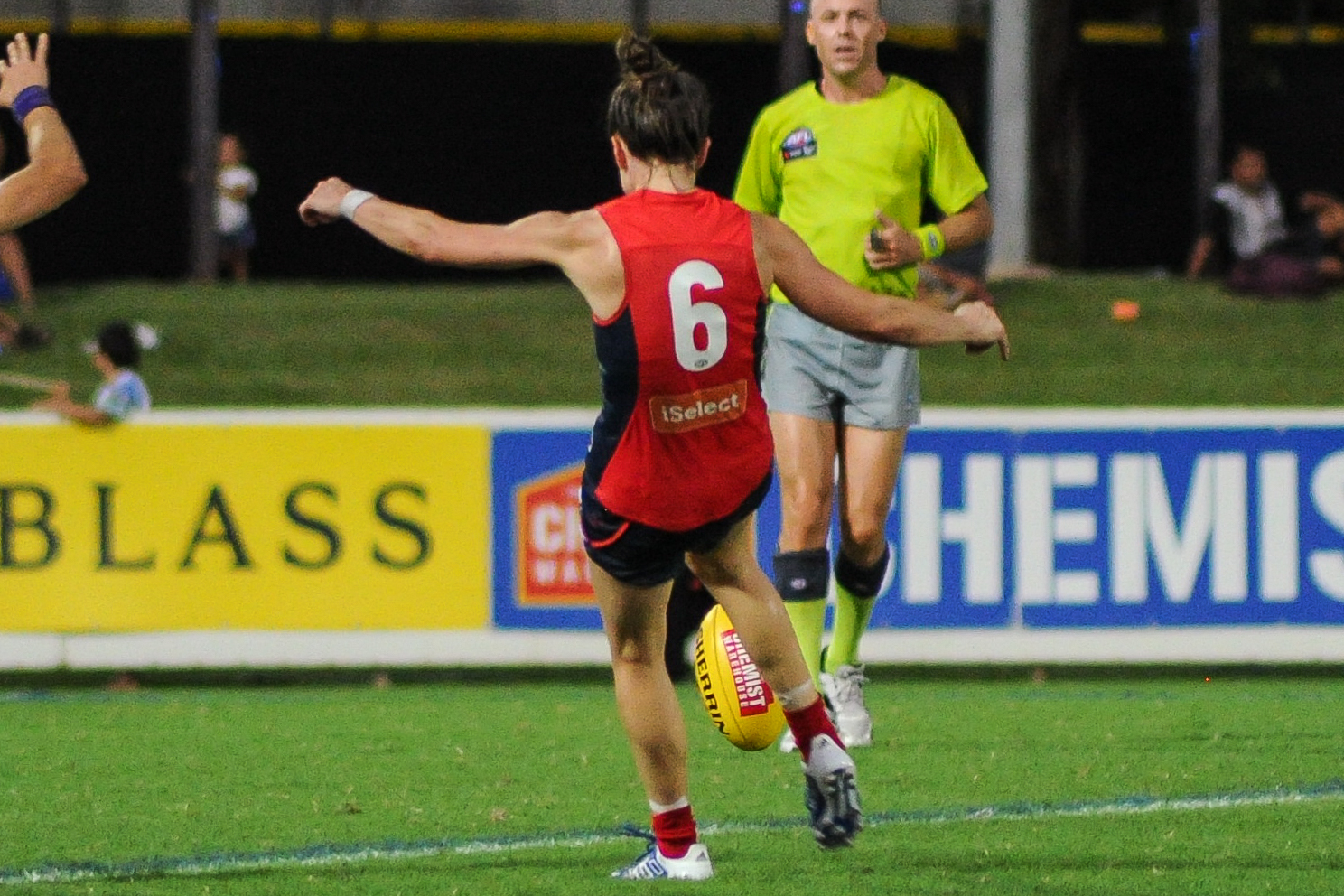
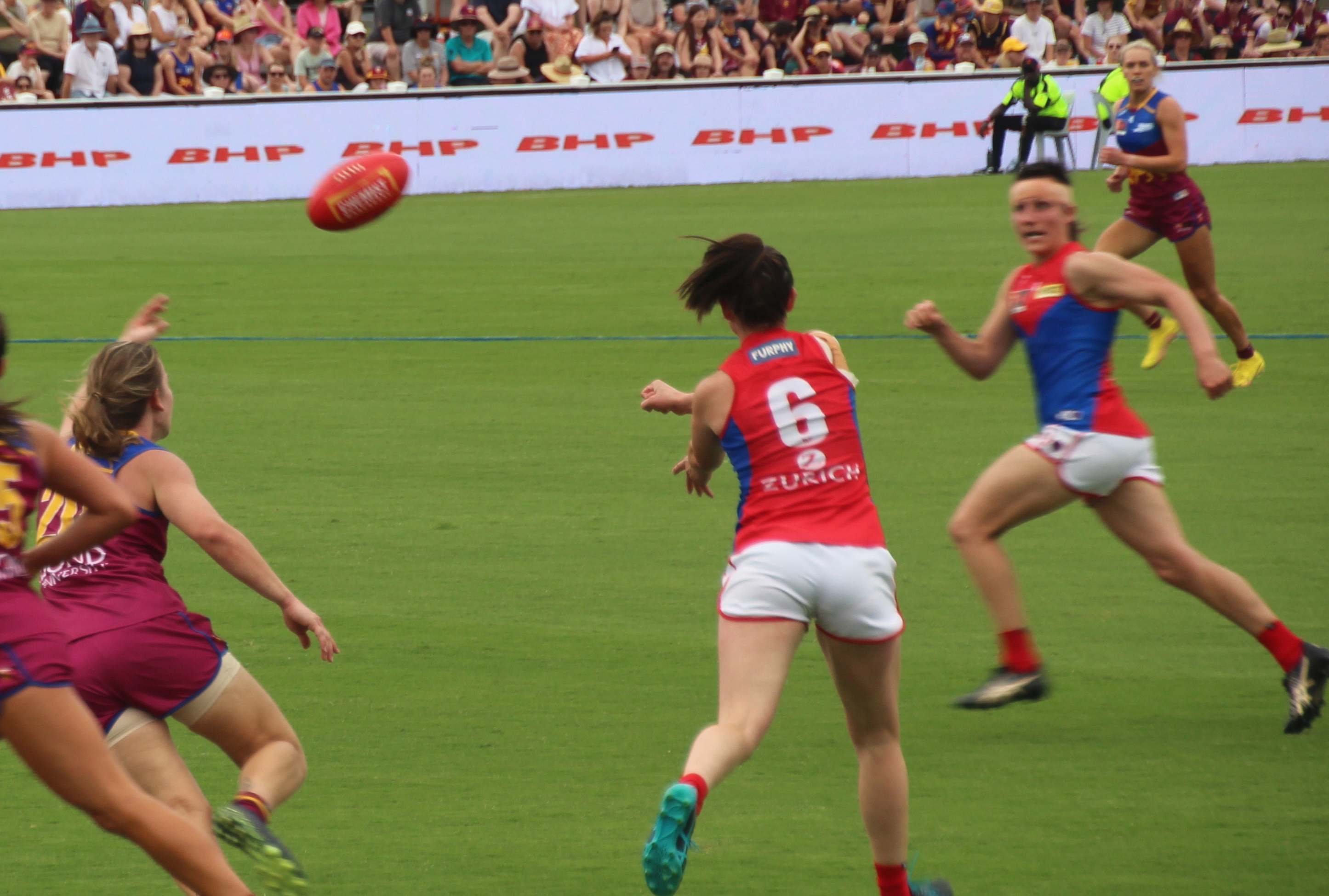
Top: Pearce kicking the ball
Bottom: Pearce handballing the ball

Pearce was known for being a smart, skilled and composed player who directed play on-field. Longtime Melbourne coach Mick Stinear described Pearce as an "on-field coach" while teammate Shelley Heath described her as "essentially another coach on the ground".

Pearce began her AFL Women's career playing primarily as a midfielder, having achieved most of her recognition playing in that position; her average of 21.9 disposals per game in 2017 was the highest of any player for the inaugural AFLW season. Upon resuming her playing career in 2020 after the birth of her twins, Pearce began playing solely as a defender before shifting to playing primarily as a forward from midway through the 2021 season; the five goals that she kicked in round 9 of season 6 were the most in a game by a Melbourne AFLW player.

== Early coaching career ==
In October 2021, Pearce was among eight women, including five current and former AFLW players, selected in the AFL's women's coaching academy for 2022; she completed a national AFL level three coaching accreditation course as part of the academy, designed to "accelerate the next generation of female coaches" in Australian rules football, and was mentored by former Darebin and St Kilda coach Peta Searle as part of the twelve-month program.

By March 2022, Pearce was considering an assistant coach position with Geelong's AFL team; she had earlier been offered the position of Essendon's inaugural AFLW coach and turned it down after serious consideration. Later that month, she joined the AFL Academy as coach of its women's program. In June, Pearce accepted a coaching role at Geelong as part of the AFL's women's coaching acceleration program. She was one of four then-current AFLW players and nine women overall to receive a position at a club; the program enabled the women to start anytime before 2025, allowing Pearce to continue playing until she decided to begin in the role.

Pearce began her role as a development coach with Geelong in February 2023, having signed a four-year contract. While in her commentary role for the Seven Network, she was refused entry into Richmond's change rooms following its round 1 draw against Carlton due to her coaching position, a decision which Richmond senior club advisor Neil Balme later clarified was a sign of respect for Pearce's intelligence: "I know I'd trust her to the point that (gathering intelligence is) not what she is there for [...] but to be able to do both jobs is a bit difficult at times". The Brisbane Lions later put the same ban on Pearce, with senior coach Chris Fagan saying that it was a hard decision and either choice was acceptable.

== AFL Women's coaching career ==
=== 2024–present: First seasons, club's first final ===
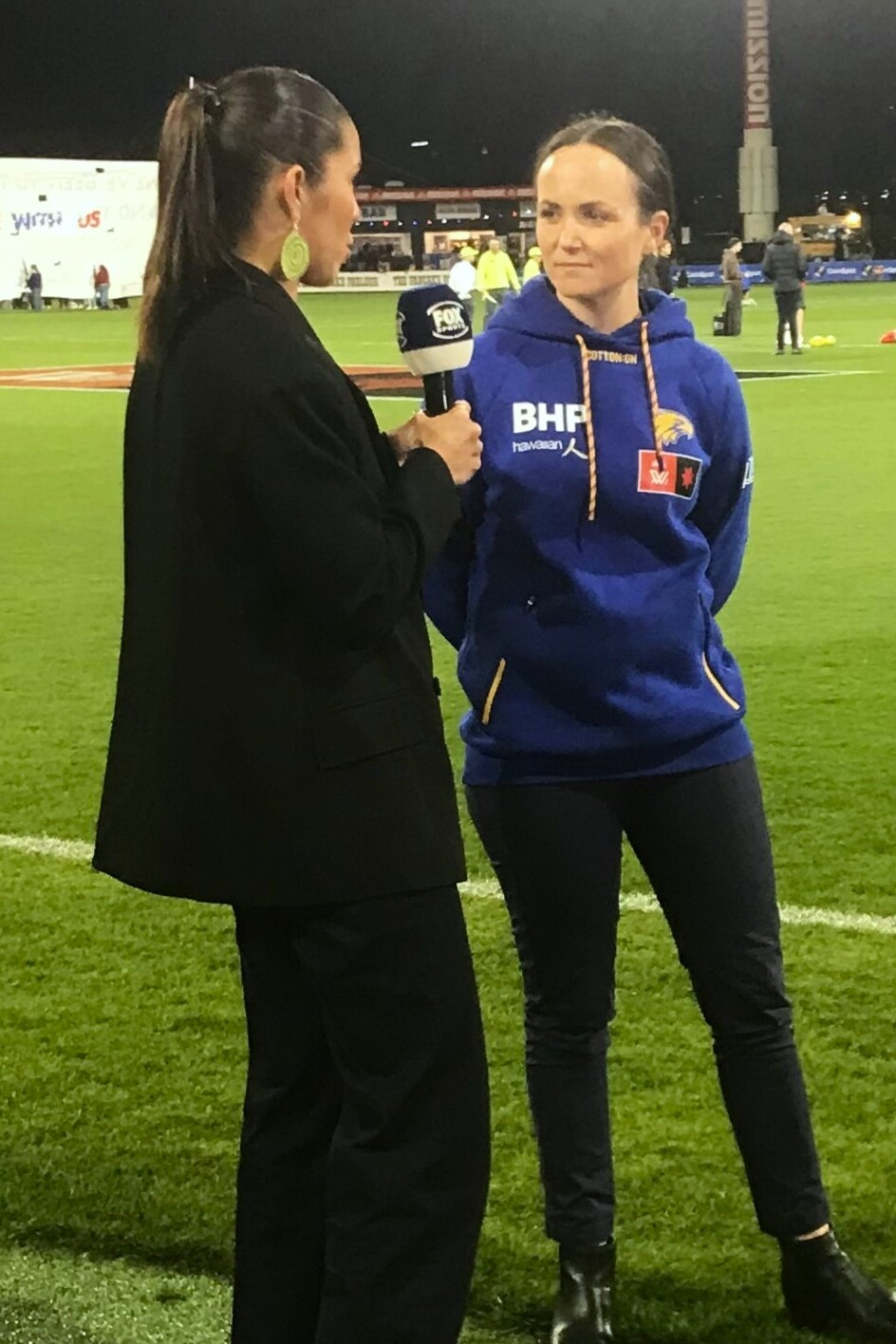
Pearce being interviewed pre-match with West Coast in 2024

In December 2023, Pearce was announced as West Coast's new AFLW senior coach on a three-year contract, replacing Michael Prior, with the club describing the appointment as "one of the biggest recruiting coups of [its] history" in a club statement. The appointment made Pearce the third former AFLW player to become a senior coach, following Lauren Arnell and Lisa Webb, and was later named at no. 1 on afl.com.au's list of the ten biggest stories of the 2023 AFL Women's season. Prior to her appointment, she had never coached her own team for a full season at any level. Pearce first coached West Coast in two unofficial practice matches during the off-season, a two-point win over Gold Coast in April and a 14-point loss to Fremantle in May, followed in August by a 56-point loss to Fremantle in a pre-season match simulation and a 32-point loss to St Kilda in a practice match. In week 1, in her first official match as an AFLW coach, Pearce coached West Coast to a one-point win over Richmond, followed by a 16-point loss to Essendon in week 2. She coached West Coast to an eleven-point win over the Western Bulldogs in week 3, overseeing West Coast's best start to an AFLW season with two wins from its first three matches, followed by a 17-point win over Collingwood in one of weeks 4's matches, marking the first time the club won consecutive AFLW matches and the first time it won three matches in a season, after only four matches. Pearce coached West Coast to a 45-point loss to reigning premier Brisbane in the other week 4 match, followed by a 24-point win over Greater Western Sydney in week 5, in which the club recorded its highest AFLW score of 10.4 (64) to place in the top eight on the ladder after six matches; however, West Coast would lose its final five matches of the season to finish 13th. Pearce described her first season as coach as a "whirlwind" and "massive learning curve", having tried to instil belief in her team to achieve immediate success, only to find "a kind of disconnect at first" given the team had previously never won more than two matches in a season.

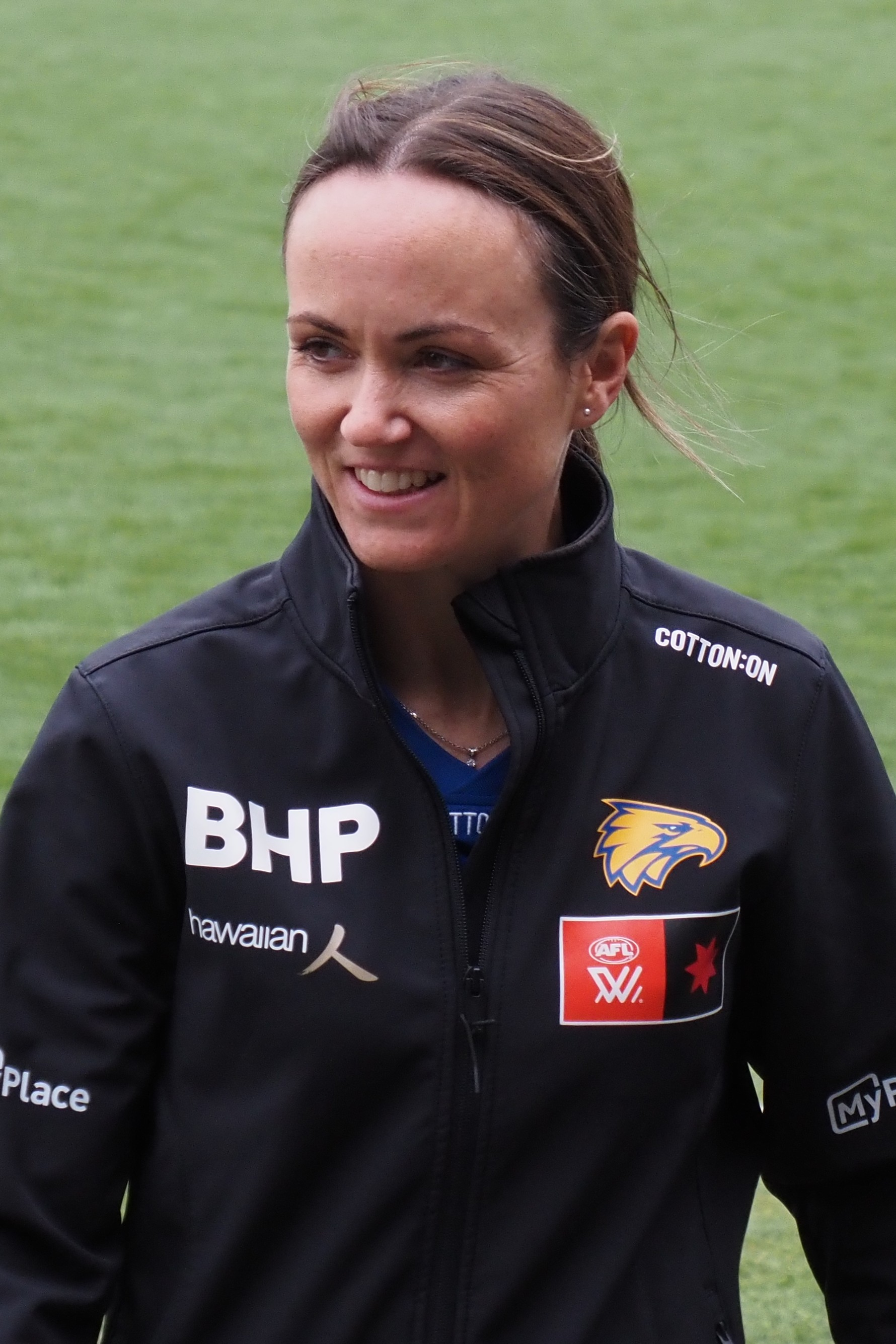
Pearce pre-match with West Coast in 2025

In July 2025, first-year West Coast AFL coach Andrew McQualter said that he would seek advice from Pearce about how to turn his struggling team's fortunes around and learn as much as he could from Pearce's first season and second pre-season as coach, with Pearce saying that she was keen to work with McQualter and learn more from the club's AFL program to better develop her own coaching. New co-captain Bella Lewis said that Pearce had brought a "real process-driven mindset" to the team, imploring the players to take things a week at a time and not look too far ahead. Leading into the AFLW season, West Coast lost to Fremantle by 22 points in a pre-season match simulation, followed by a draw with the Western Bulldogs in an official practice match. Pearce coached the team to a 15-point win over Gold Coast in round 1, a five-point loss to Essendon in round 2 and a 14-point come-from-behind win over St Kilda in round 3 to start the season. Fox Footy caller Kelli Underwood described the St Kilda win as "the best win under [Pearce's] coaching reign [...] it was an absolute masterclass by the coach", while Fox commentator Chyloe Kurdas noted the belief shown by the players and said that they were playing in a fashion similar to how Pearce herself played, describing Pearce as "certainly a 17th player" given her influence on the team; her six career wins as coach to that point were the most by a West Coast AFLW coach. West Coast followed with a similar come-from-behind win over Port Adelaide in round 4, kicking seven of the last eight goals of the match to win by 19 points, followed by a seven-point loss to Fremantle in round 5 and a 51-point loss to Melbourne in round 6, which marked Pearce's first time coaching against her former club. The team responded with a 42-point win over Greater Western Sydney in round 7, its biggest ever win, and recorded its highest AFLW score of 11.9 (75) despite a flu outbreak causing several players to be left out of the squad, which forced the club to name a top-up player to field a full team. West Coast followed up with a 45-point win over Collingwood in round 8, besting its club record from the previous round, before falling to Adelaide by 17 points in round 9. Pearce coached the team to a 31-point win over Geelong in round 10, followed by a 17-point loss to Sydney in round 11, leaving West Coast needing to win in the final round to guarantee its first AFLW finals appearance; the team lost to Carlton by 20 points, but other round 12 results worked in West Coast's favour, allowing the team to finish eighth with a 6–6 win–loss record and qualify for finals for the first time since its entry into the competition in 2020, earning a rematch against Carlton in an elimination final. Pearce described the feeling of the team waiting until the final match of the home-and-away season to know its fate as a "weird experience" and praised the players and staff for their work during the season, stressing that it was a "whole club investment" and she had been receiving "way too much credit" for the team's success. West Coast lost to Carlton by 41 points in the elimination final the following week.

In May 2026, Pearce was named as senior assistant coach to Darren Crocker for the Australian team in the inaugural AFL Women's Australia v Ireland match in August. Leading into the season, West Coast midfielder Ella Roberts said that Pearce had been growing more confident in her coaching and ability to pass on her football knowledge, which Roberts described as "unlike anything I've seen before". West Coast opened the season with an upset 12-point loss to Greater Western Sydney.

=== Coaching statistics ===
Updated to the end of round 7, 2026.

Legend
W	Wins	L	Losses	D	Draws	%	Win percentage
†	Team qualified for finals

Season	Team	Ladder	Home-and-away season					Finals					Total																			
Season	Team	Ladder	Games	W	L	D	%	Games	W	L	D	%	Games	W	L	D	%															
2024	West Coast	13 / 18	Games	W	L	D	%	Games	W	L	D	%	Games	W	L	D	%	11	4	7	0	36.4	0	—	—	—	—	11	4	7	0	36.4
2025	West Coast	8 / 18^{†}	12	6	6	0	50.0	1	0	1	0	0.0	13	6	7	0	46.2															
2026	West Coast	11 / 18	7	3	4	0	42.9						7	3	4	0	42.9															
Career			30	13	17	0	43.3	1	0	1	0	0.0	31	13	18	0	41.9															

== Honours and achievements ==
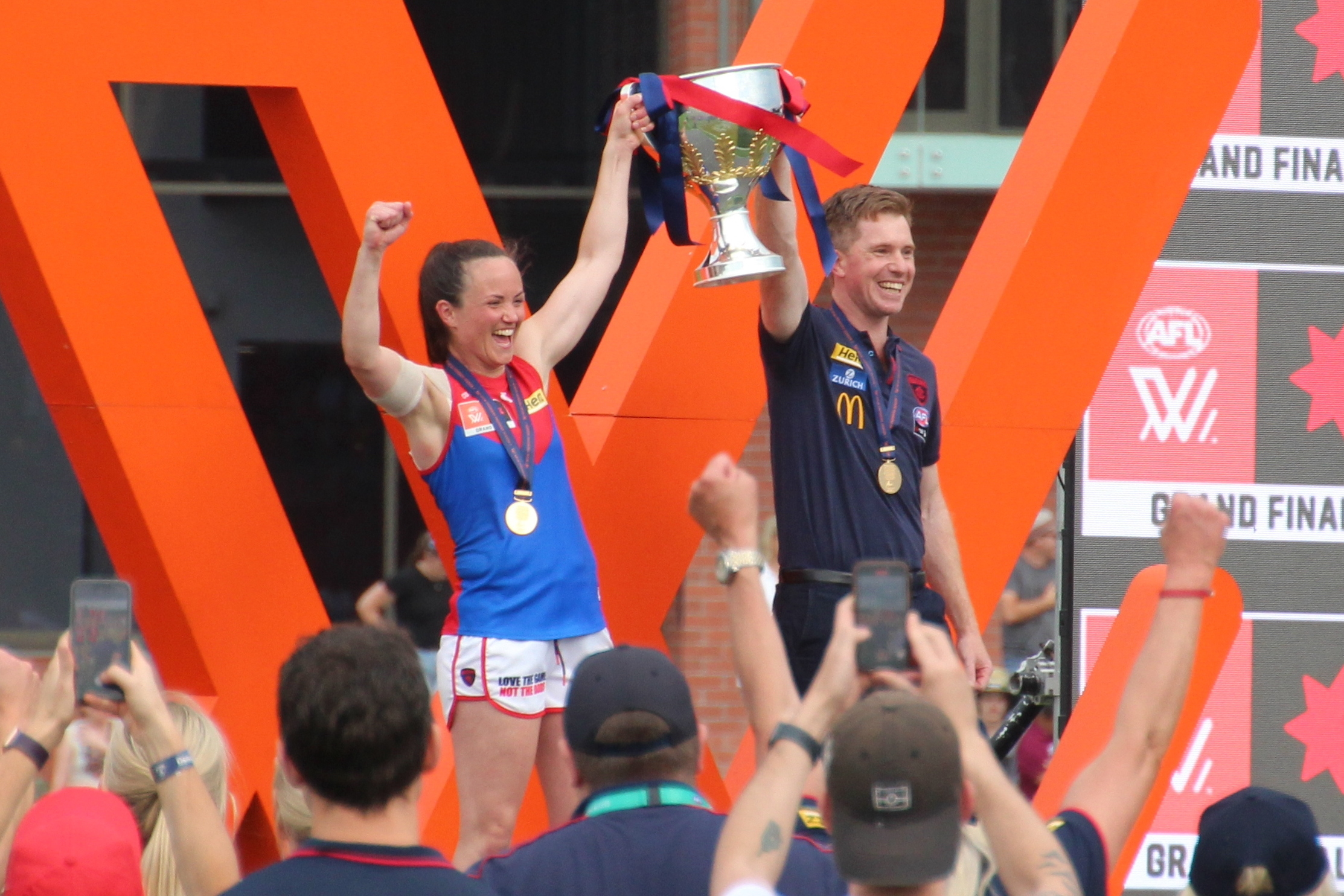
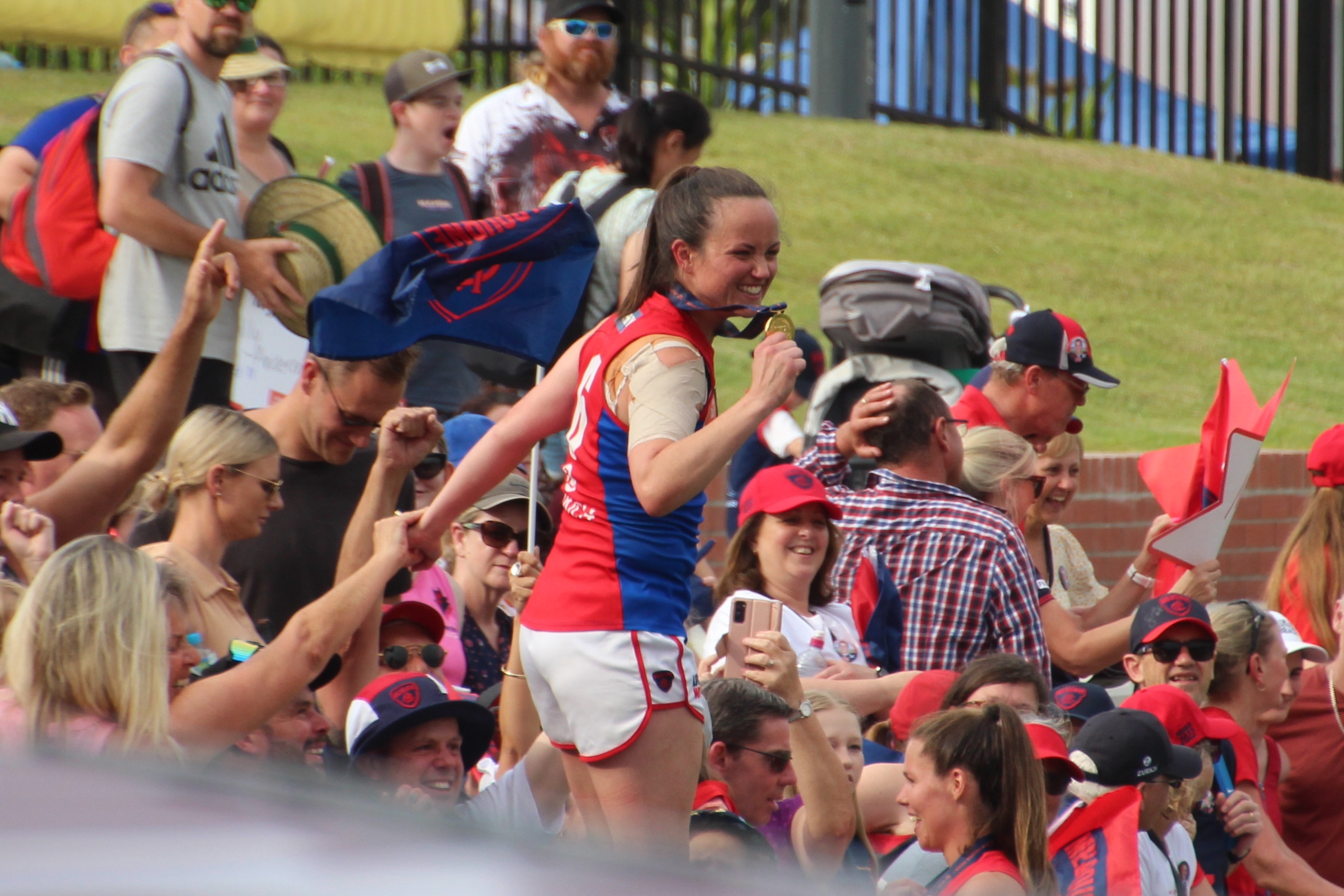
Top: Pearce and coach Mick Stinear holding the season 7 premiership cup aloft
Bottom: Pearce showing off her season 7 premiership medallion
- Australian Football Hall of Fame (inducted 2025)
- AFL Women's premiership player (Melbourne): S7 (c)
- Melbourne captain: 2017–2018, 2020–2022 (S7)
- 3× AFL Women's All-Australian team: 2017 (c), 2018, S6
- 3× Melbourne best and fairest: 2017, 2018, S6
- 4× AFLPA AFLW best captain: 2017, 2018, 2020, S6
- AFLW State of Origin best-on-ground: 2017
- Victoria representative honours in AFLW State of Origin: 2017

== Media career ==
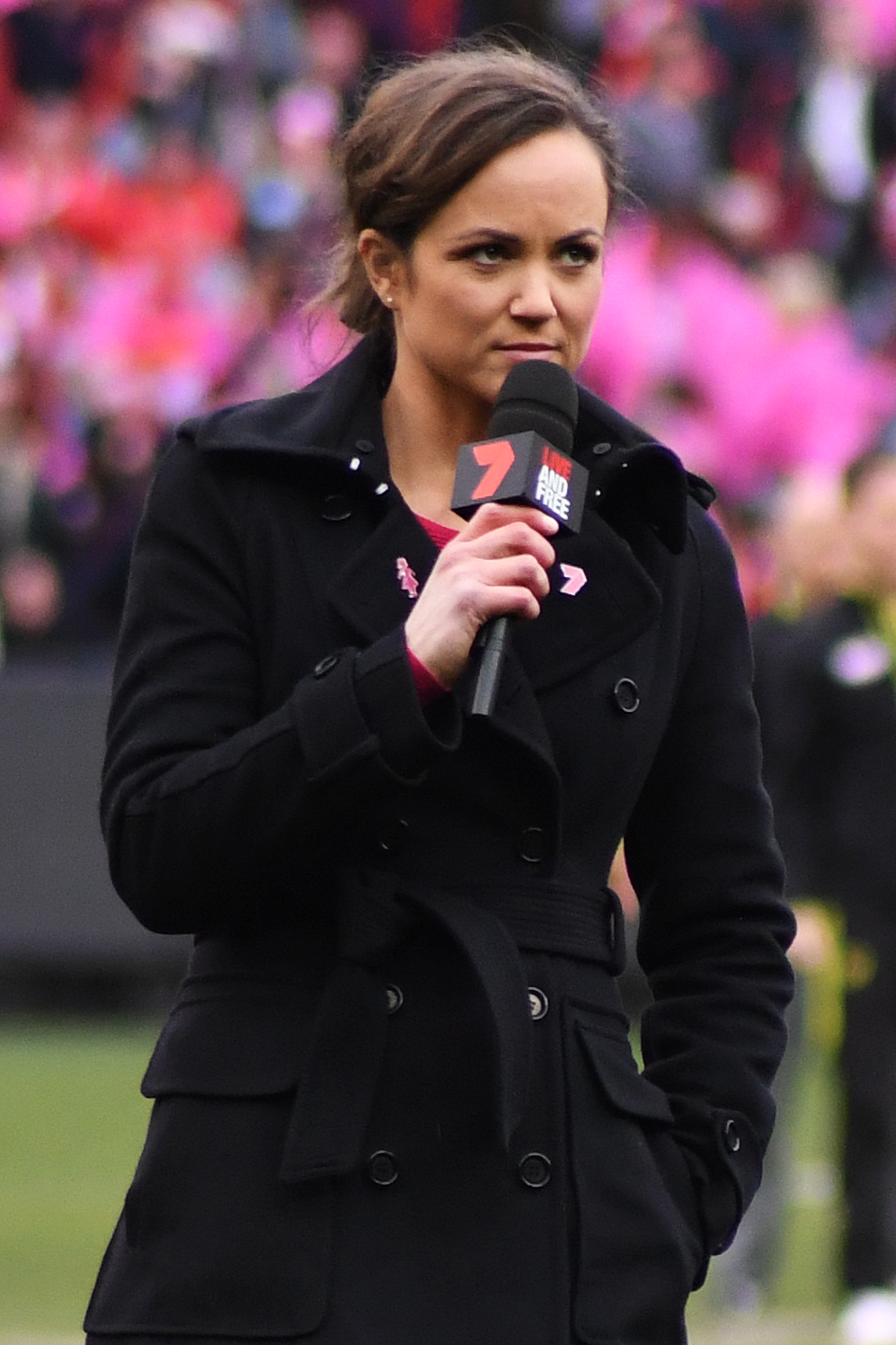
Pearce working for the Seven Network in 2018

Pearce is an expert commentator for the Seven Network's AFL coverage on television and previously provided commentary for AFL Nation's AFL coverage for 1116 SEN on radio. In 2016, Pearce began appearing as a panel member on the Seven Network program AFL Game Day; she was set to continue in the role in 2020 before the show was cancelled due to the COVID-19 pandemic. In 2018, Pearce began appearing on the SEN morning shows SEN Breakfast (with Garry Lyon and Tim Watson) and Whateley (with Gerard Whateley), and in 2019, she hosted This is Grit, a weekly podcast series on SEN focusing on sportswomen. In 2021, she co-hosted The W Show for AFL Media alongside Nat Edwards, where they analysed and discussed AFL Women's news and topics. She previously provided special comments for radio network Triple M in 2017 and has written columns for newspaper The Age.

Pearce was a boundary rider for Seven's coverage of the AFL Grand Final in 2018 and 2019. In 2021, she became the first woman to provide special comments for Seven's coverage of the grand final, and was widely praised by fans and media for her commentary. Pearce won the award for Best Opinion/Analysis – TV/Radio at the 2021 Australian Football Media Association Awards, with the AFMA commenting: "Daisy's football knowledge is incredible and she leaves viewers with a better appreciation of the game". Pearce was shifted to Seven's Friday night commentary team for the 2022 season, again providing special comments for the grand final that season, before moving to Thursday nights in 2023 upon commencing her coaching role with Geelong's AFL team. Pearce took a year off from commentary after becoming West Coast's AFLW senior coach, before rejoining Seven in 2025 to commentate on the network's coverage of Western Australia-based matches, occasionally appearing on other matches for the network. In 2026, she began appearing as a part of a rotating team of expert commentators on Sunday matches.

== Advocacy ==
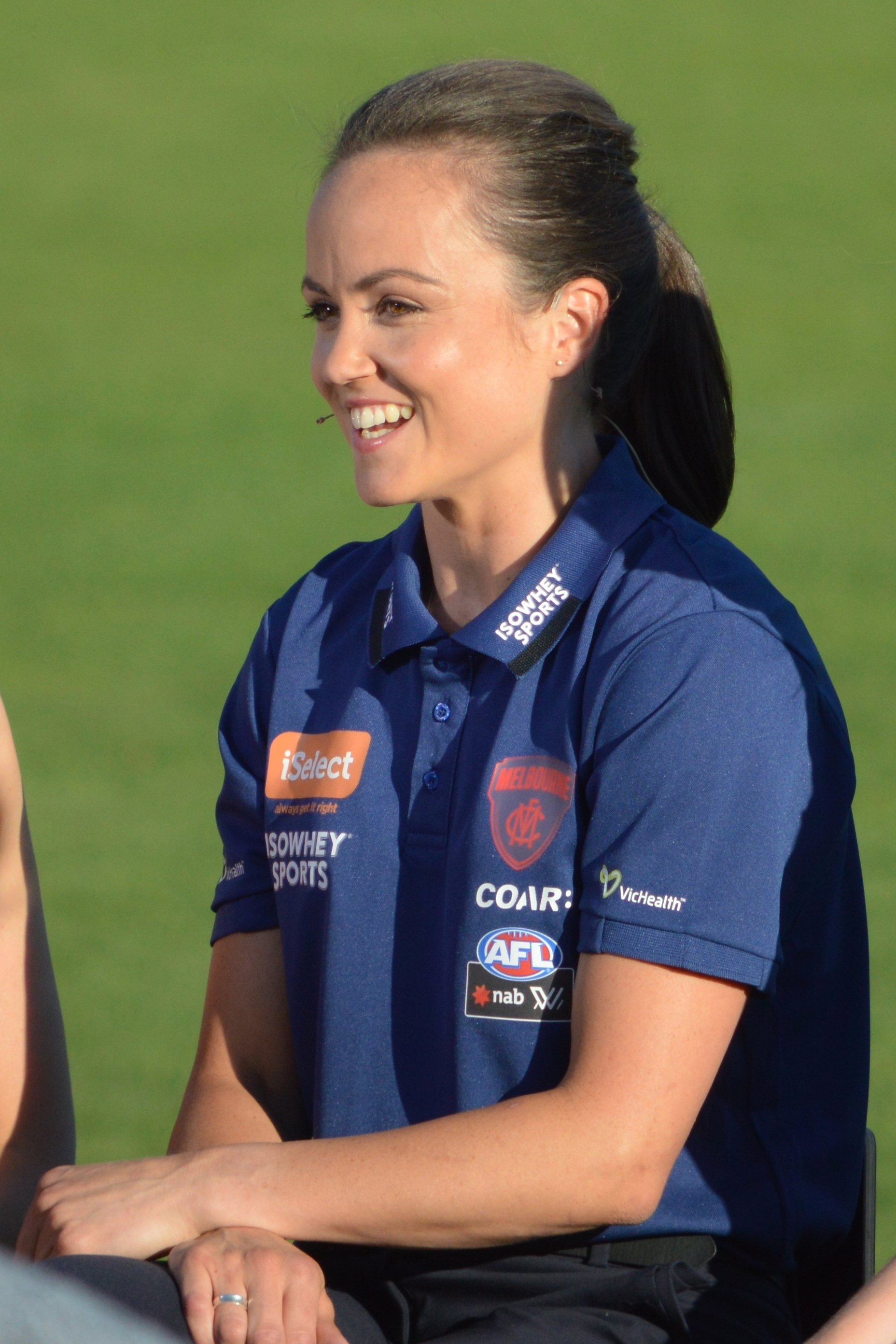
Pearce appearing on the Seven Network before the first AFLW match in 2017

Pearce has advocated for both men and women to commentate and talk about women's football in the media. After Tiffany Cherry spoke out against the Nine Network in February 2018 for failing to stand up for gender equality after being replaced by Clint Stanaway as host of the Nine program Women's Footy, Pearce said, "I enjoy seeing men working across and well-informed football commentators talking about [women's football]... why can't we see men working across the AFL Women's competition?" She said that if there was a belief that only women should call AFLW games and only men should call AFL games, "It's almost as if we are taking a few steps back". Pearce believed that this applied to coaching, saying that while she supported women coaching in football, she wanted "the best coach that's out there" to coach her, describing Stinear as "the best coach for the job" at Melbourne.

One of several high-profile players to speak out during the AFLW's 2020–2022 collective bargaining agreement negotiations in 2019, Pearce supported the AFL Players Association and the AFL's deal to gradually extend the length of AFLW seasons over the three-year period (Note: The AFL's deal was to extend the 2020 season to eight home-and-away rounds, 2021 to nine and 2022 to ten, with three weeks of finals in each season.) and played down talks of a crisis developing after a group of players considered splitting from the AFLPA to create their own players union. She believed that broader talks between the AFLPA and AFLW players, which would allow more players to speak directly to the AFLPA, would result in an agreement that would satisfy all players. "[If] the AFL Players Association tell us that moving forward 'we're going to improve communications [...] because we've acknowledged there's some challenges with communicating with part-time girls', I trust that they'll do that".

== Legacy ==
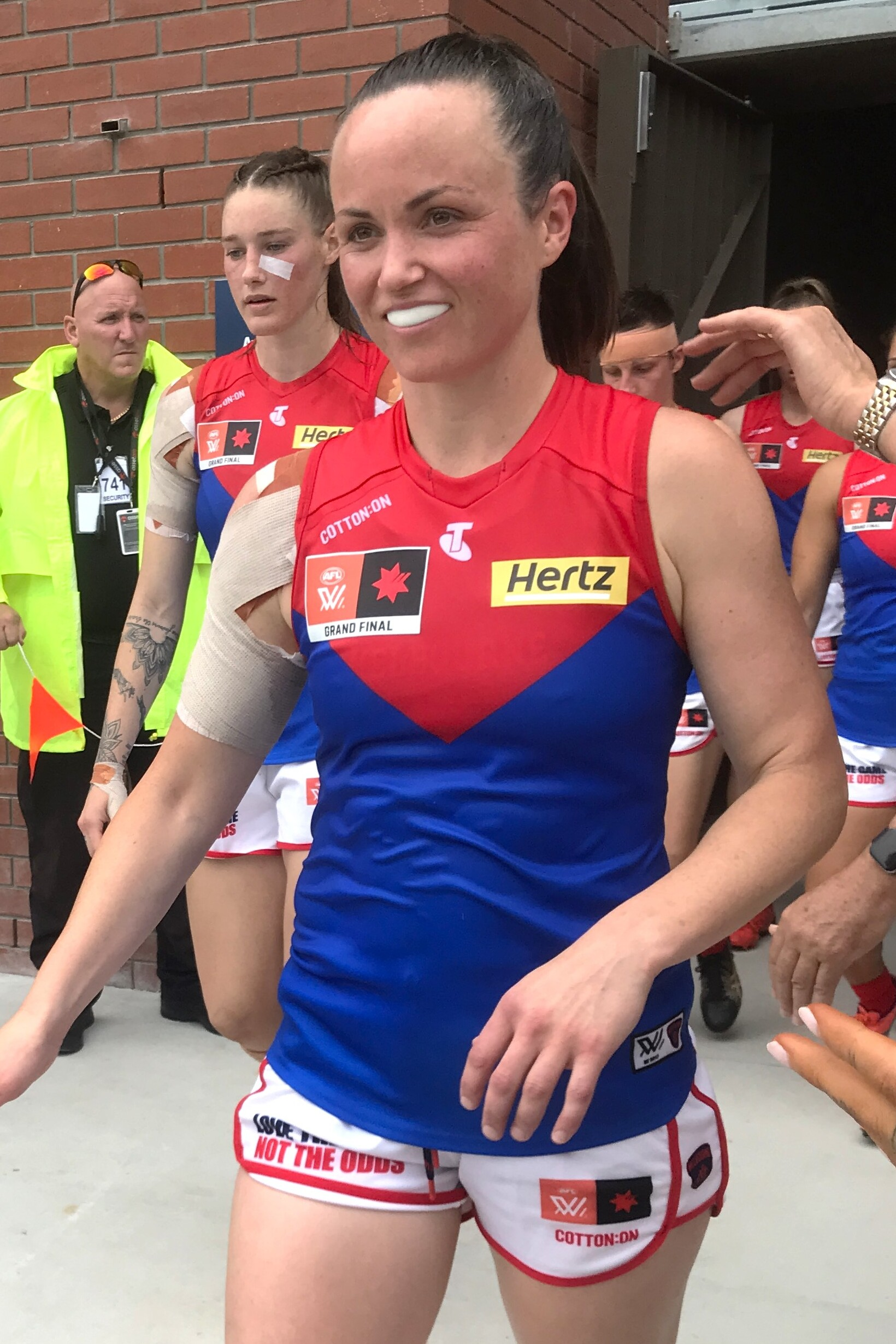
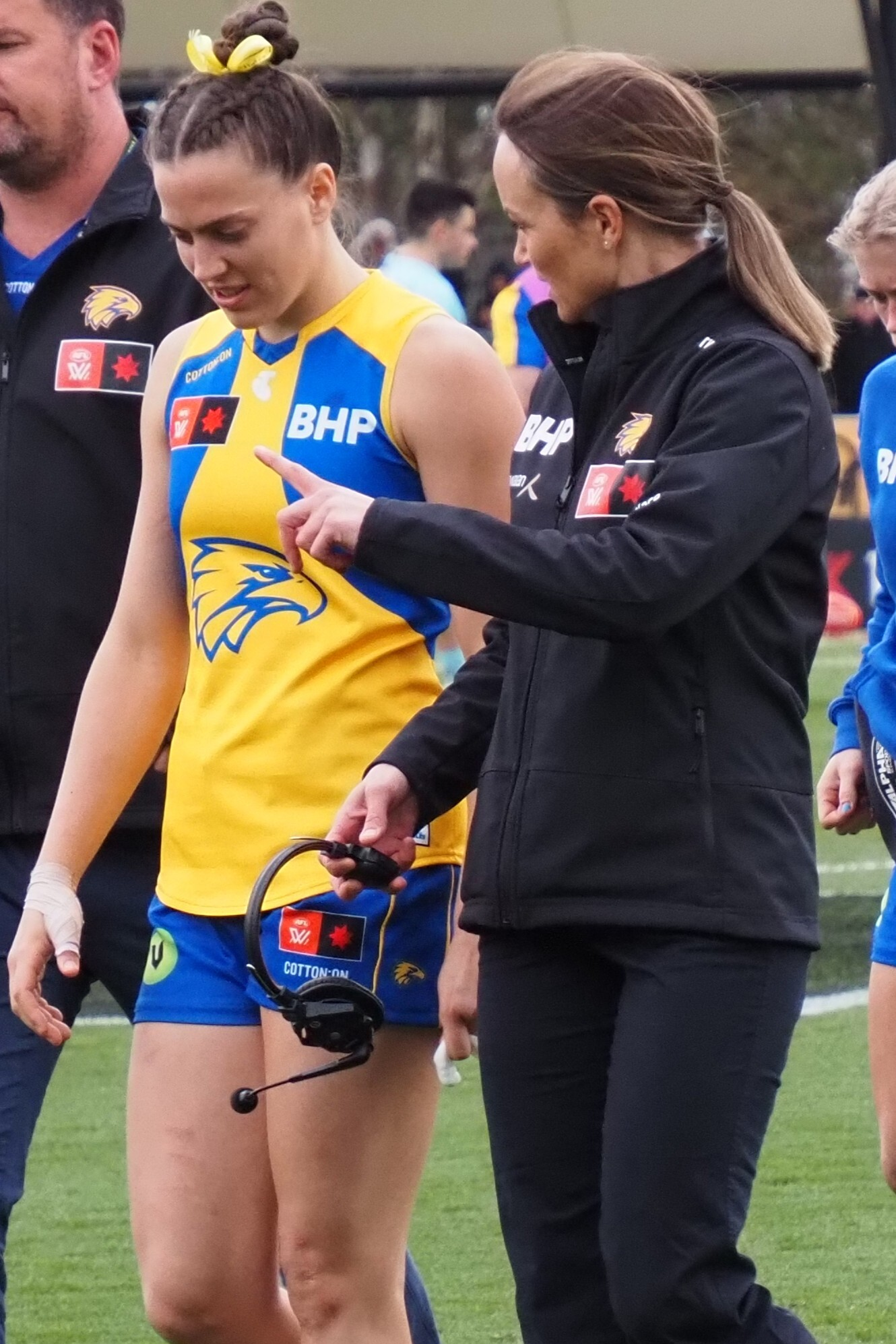
Left: Pearce leading her teammates onto the field at the end of half-time of the 2022 AFL Women's season 7 Grand Final
Right: Pearce during a three-quarter time break with West Coast in 2025

Pearce is often regarded by media as a pioneer of women's Australian rules football and the face of the AFLW, and is highly regarded across the football industry for her professionalism, knowledge and leadership, both on and off the field, as well as being a role model for current and future female footballers. Herald Sun journalist Jay Clark wrote that Pearce had "set the standard in training and professionalism (in women's football) for years" and that her contributions "over more than a decade [made] her a living legend of the women's game". SEN broadcaster Gerard Whateley called her "the defining figure of the AFLW era" and "the face of a social movement as well as a sport".

Daisy's just the complete package and by playing at Darebin with her, I see how hard she works off the field [...] I couldn't think of a better partner in crime to start that (AFL Women's journey) with.

— Melissa Hickey, Darebin and Melbourne teammate, in 2016

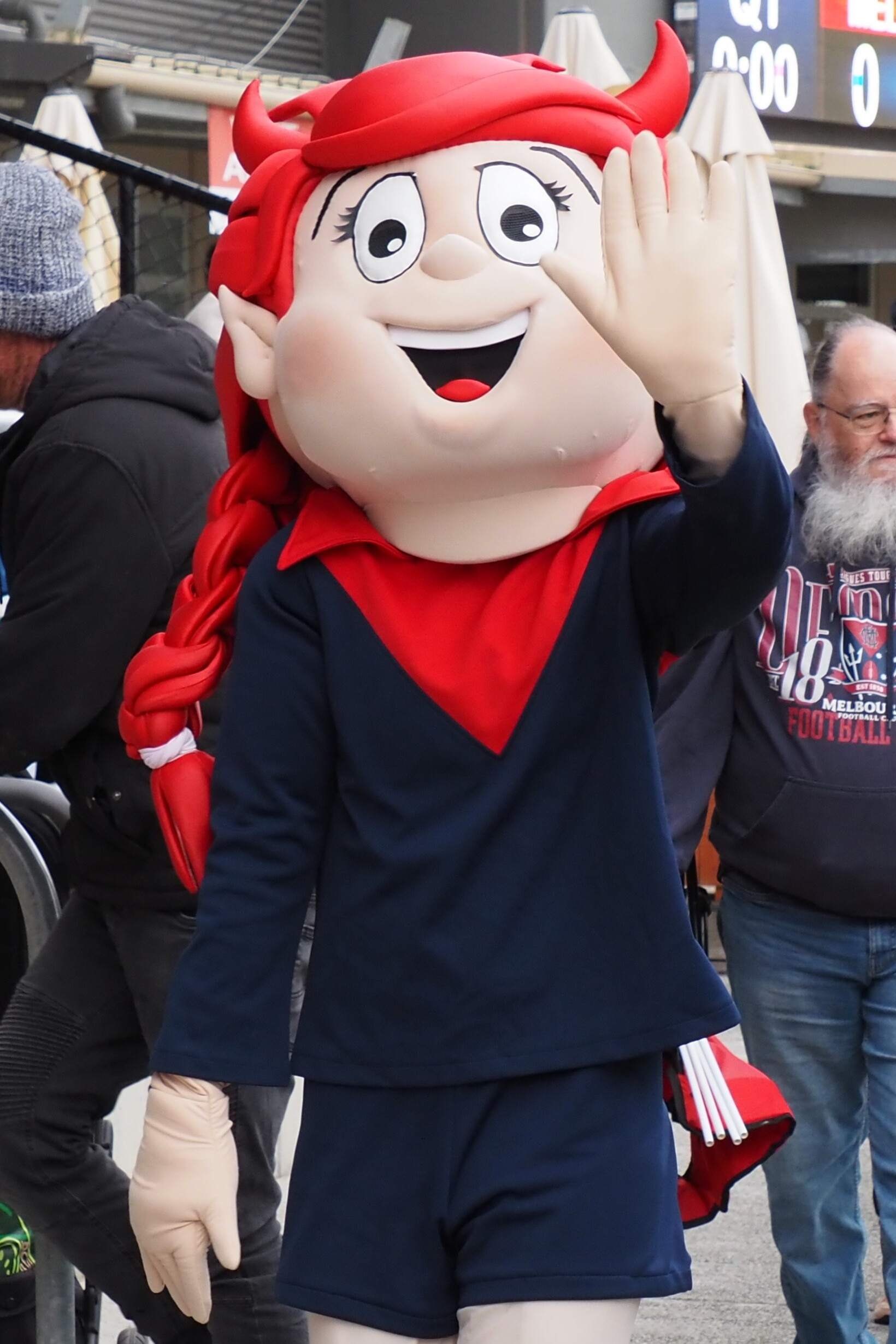
Daisy the mascot pre-match in 2025

[Pearce] has been a generational player and a generational leader. Talk about a story of breaking glass ceilings [...] she has just done it by being good in a way that has totally changed the landscape for young women.

— Gillon McLachlan, AFL chief executive officer, in 2020

[Pearce's] knowledge is excellent. God, she is well prepared [...] she has a presence. You can feel it. She has that lovely balance of being engaging, warm and charismatic, but at the same time she is humble and keen to listen and improve.

— Bruce McAvaney, longtime Seven Network host and commentator, in 2020

I don't think I've ever had a better captain than Daisy at any level of football. Everyone I talk to, including friends from other teams, always comment on how amazing it must be to be captained by Daisy. Everyone respects her and she always delivers no matter what, as a person or as a captain.

— Shelley Heath, Melbourne teammate, in 2022

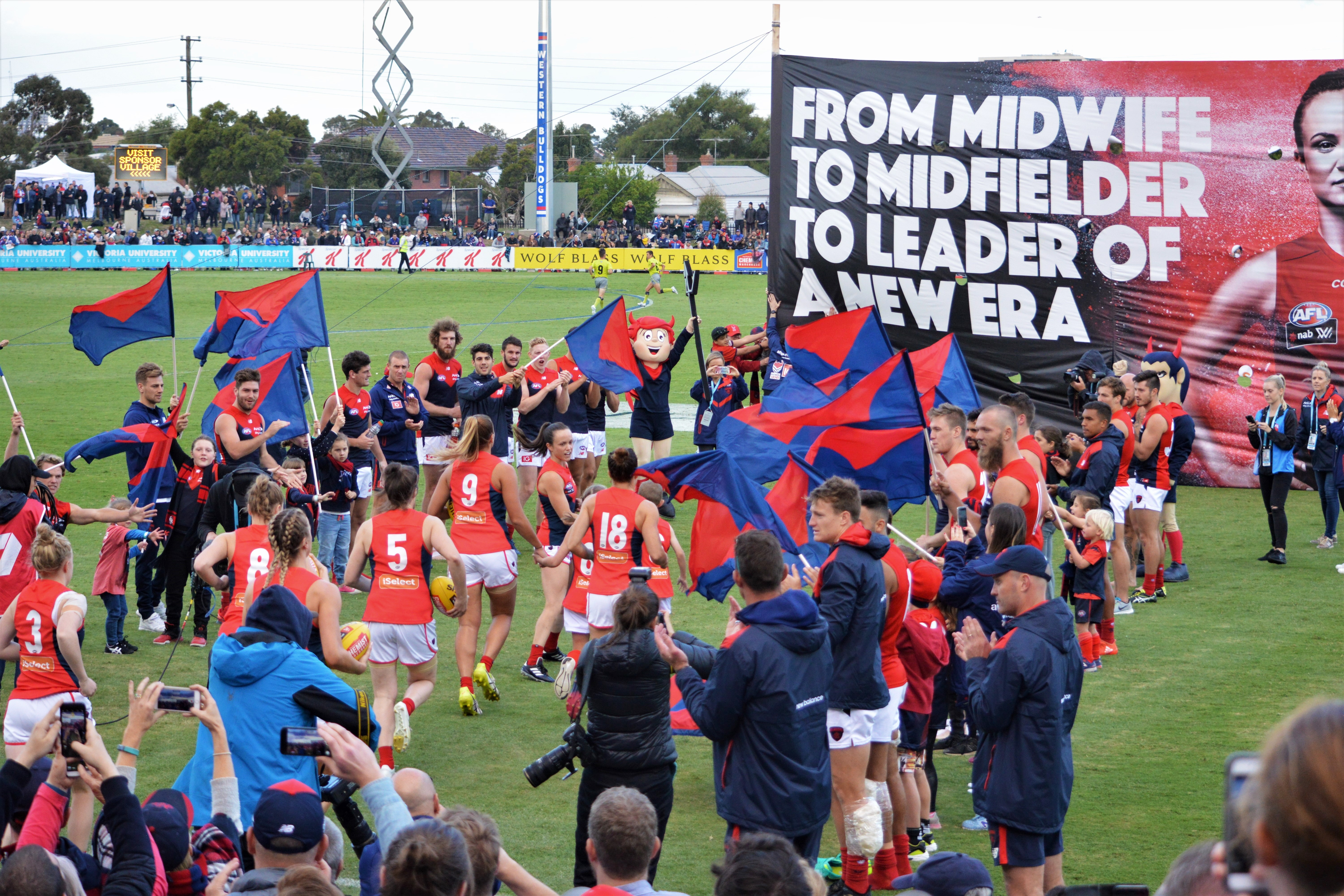
Pearce leading her teammates onto the field before a match in 2017

I think having a coach who has so much trust in us (West Coast players) and has so much knowledge, like Daisy, she just knows what she's talking about [... our] young players are really getting to play their best football because of her.

— Ella Roberts, West Coast player, in 2024

In 2016, Pearce was named Football Woman of the Year for her work as the AFL's female football ambassador, an AFL talent coordinator and a graduate intern at the Melbourne Football Club. In February 2017, Melbourne unveiled its new AFLW mascot, a costumed human depicting a "young female footy player", named Daisy in honour of Pearce. On 7 March 2017, Pearce became the first woman to be elected as a director on the board of the AFLPA; the association had decided that day to include AFLW players as full members.

In September 2018, the VFL Women's best and fairest award was named the Lambert–Pearce Medal to honour Pearce and VWFL founding committee member and former president Helen Lambert. Pearce won the inaugural award in 2016 after winning six Helen Lambert Medals in the VWFL. In December 2023, Melbourne named its AFL Women's best and fairest award the Daisy Pearce Trophy to honour Pearce, a three-time recipient of the award, and by August 2024, the club had named its academy for its first- to third-year AFLW players the Daisy Pearce Academy. In December 2024, Pearce received life membership at Melbourne for her contributions to the club, and in June 2025, she was inducted into the Australian Football Hall of Fame, with Pearce and fellow 2025 inductee Erin Phillips becoming the first AFLW players to be inducted and joining Debbie Lee as the only women in the Hall of Fame. In April 2026, she was named as an interchange player in afl.com.au's AFLW team of the decade; her 55 career matches were the fewest of any player to be selected in the team.

== Personal life ==
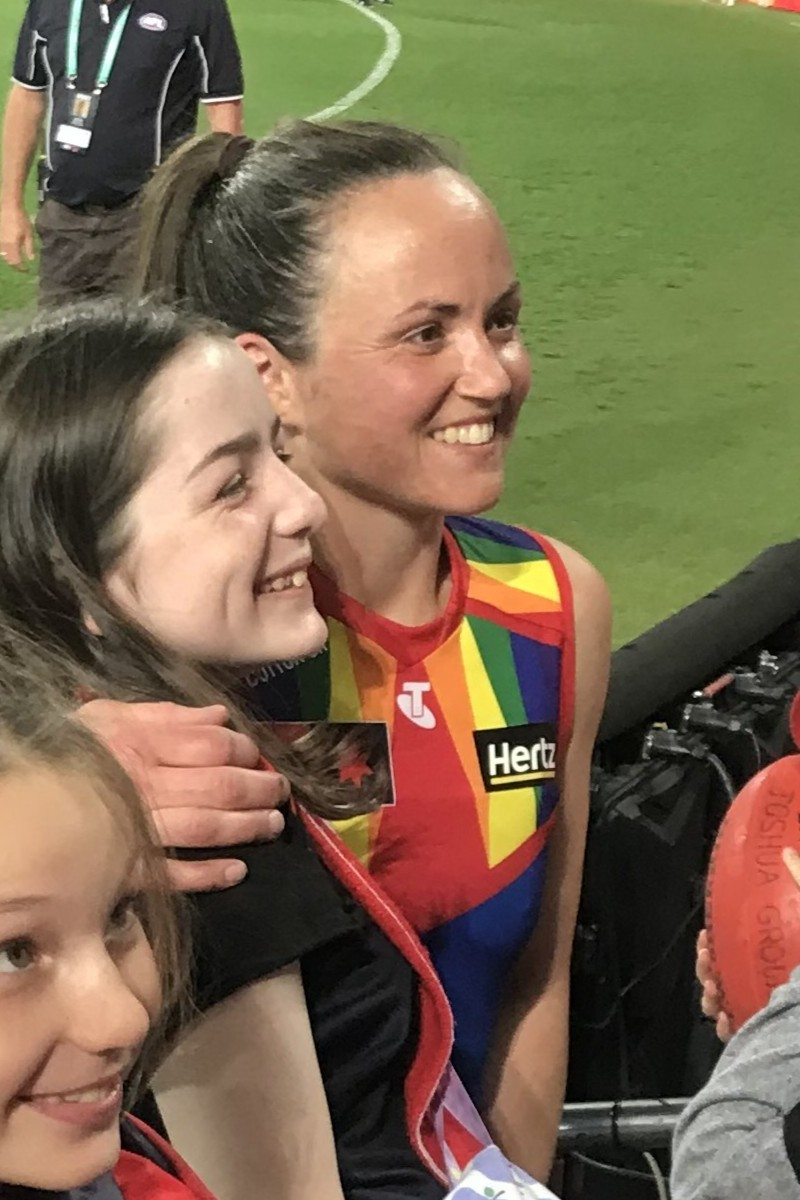
Pearce post-match with Melbourne in 2022

Pearce studied a Bachelor of Nursing and Midwifery at La Trobe University, graduating in 2010 and receiving a Distinguished Alumni award in 2019. She worked as a midwife at Box Hill Hospital and lived in Eltham at the time. Pearce gave birth to twins with her partner, firefighter Ben O'Neill, in February 2019 via a caesarean section. Her son was diagnosed with dextrocardia while she was pregnant. In October 2020, Pearce and her family relocated to Porepunkah, near Bright, and she divided her time between there and Melbourne, before relocating with her family to Perth to begin coaching at West Coast in 2024.

In June 2021, Pearce participated in the annual Big Freeze at the 'G event to raise funds for motor neurone disease (MND) research, sliding into the ice bath at the MCG in costume as the titular character from the Australian animated series Bluey. The 2021 edition of the event raised more than $10 million for Neale Daniher's charity, Fight MND. Following her 50th AFLW game in 2022, which coincided with season 7's Pride Round, Pearce decided to sell her specially designed guernsey at auction and donate all funds to The Reach Foundation, a youth not-for-profit organisation established by former Melbourne player and president Jim Stynes.
