= Emma Zielke =

Australian rules footballer (born 1988)

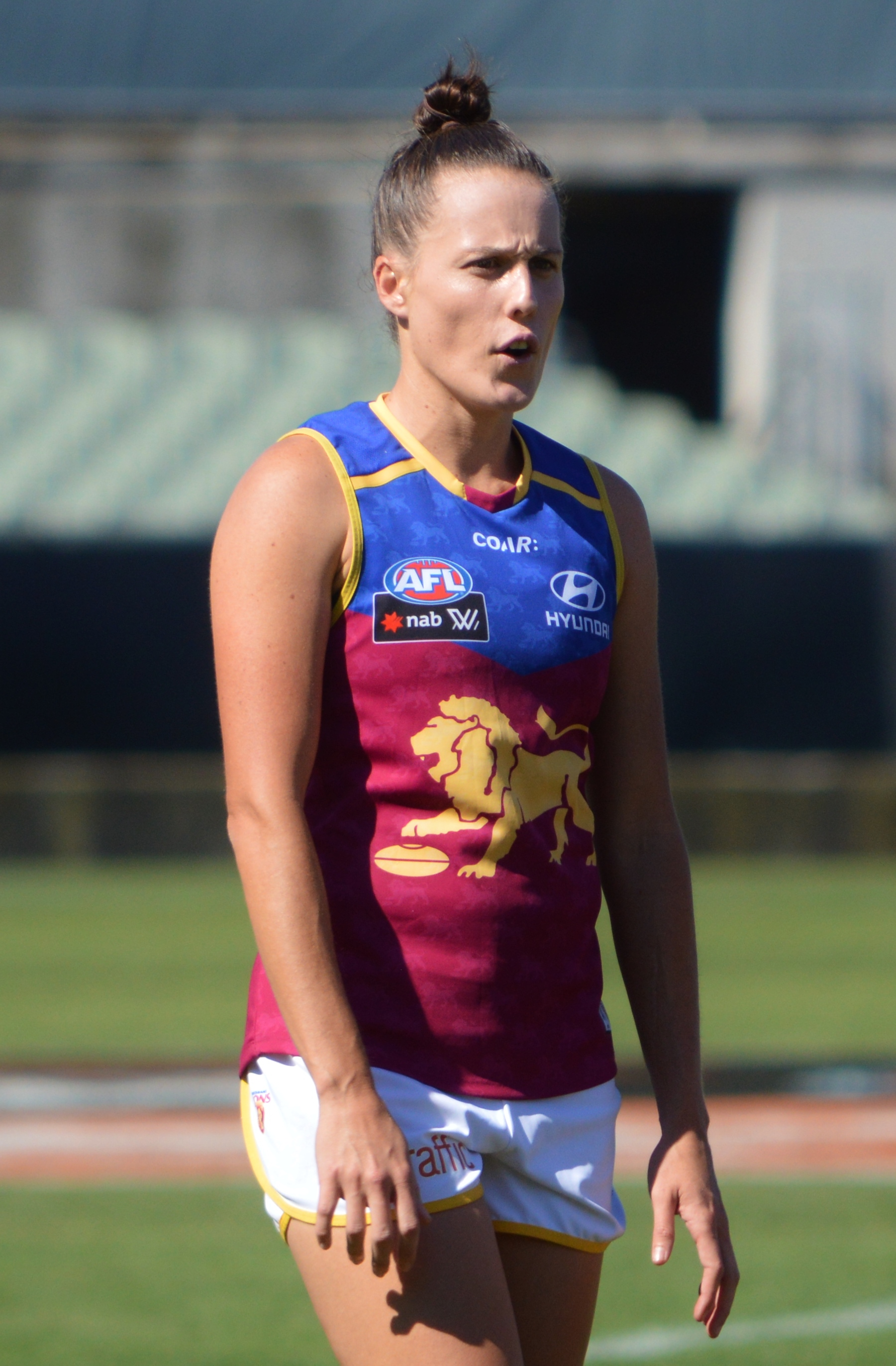
- Zielke playing for Brisbane in March 2017

Personal information
- Born: 19 April 1988 (age 38); Nambour, Queensland
- Original team: University of Queensland (QWAFL)
- Draft: Priority signing, 2016: Brisbane
- Debut: Round 1, 2017, Brisbane vs. Melbourne, at Casey Fields
- Height: 169 cm (5 ft 7 in)
- Position: Midfielder

Playing career^{1}
Years	Club	Games (Goals)
2017–2021	Brisbane	41 (4)

Representative team honours^{2}
Years	Team	Games (Goals)
2017	The Allies	1 (0)
- ^{1} Playing statistics correct to the end of the 2021 season.^{2} Representative statistics correct as of 2017.

Career highlights
- AFLW: AFLW premiership player (2021); AFLW premiership captain (2021); Brisbane captain: 2017–2018, 2020–2021; State: 2× QWAFL best and fairest: 2014, 2015; 3× QWAFL premiership captain: 2013–2015 and 2019 QAFLW Premiership player at Coorparoo Senior Football Club; Awarded 2015 Best on Ground Medal in QALFW GF; Presented with the "Emma Zielke Medal" in 2022 named after the QAFLW League Best and Fairest player

Emma Zielke (born 19 April 1988) is a retired Australian rules footballer who played for the Brisbane Lions in the AFL Women's competition. She was the club's inaugural AFLW team captain, leading the club in 2017–2018 and 2020–2021.

== Early life and state league football ==
Zielke was born in Nambour, Queensland but raised in Bundaberg from the age of 3. She grew up a passionate Brisbane Broncos fan and played soccer from the age of 6. Following high school graduation, Zielke moved to Brisbane to pursue greater opportunities in soccer but quickly lost passion for the sport and tried her hand at Australian rules football after being convinced by friends to try the sport. She first played Aussie rules in 2008 at the age of 19 for her local club Morningside.

She was selected to participate in the women's AFL high-performance camp in 2010. As part of the program she played in a curtain-raiser exhibition match ahead of the round 12, 2010 AFL match between Melbourne and Collingwood. After the team at Morningside folded, Zielke approached the Coorparoo Football Club about establishing a women's team in 2013, to play in the AFL Queensland Women's League (QAWFL). She was the club's inaugural captain. In 2013, a broken arm forced Zielke to miss a considerable period of football, including a chance to play in the first women's AFL exhibition match. She returned to football late in the season and captained Coorparoo to a state-league premiership. She kicked a goal after the siren to win the game.

In 2014 and 2015, she captained her second and third consecutive QAWFL premierships, while also being awarded the league's best and fairest in both years. Zielke moved again in 2016, this time to the University of Queensland side competing again in the QAWFL. She was named in the league's team of the year at the conclusion of the season. In 2014, Zielke was drafted by Melbourne ahead of the years women's AFL exhibition match. She was not retained after that year's match and would subsequently re-nominate for the draft in 2015. She was selected again, this time by the Western Bulldogs. She later played in and captained the Brisbane Lion's representative side in the 2016 exhibition series. Zielke has captained Queensland at three AFL Women's National Championships.

== AFL Women's career ==
Zielke was signed as a priority access player by Brisbane in August 2016, ahead of the inaugural AFL Women's season in 2017. She completed a reduced pre-season ahead of 2017, after breaking her foot in September 2016. Zielke was named the club's inaugural AFL Women's captain in January 2017.

Zielke was highlighted as "Player of the Week" for her round 3 performance in the 2017 AFL Women's season. It was the second round in a row that a Brisbane Lions player received this honor from the AFL Players Association. At the end of the season, Zielke was nominated by her teammates for the AFLW Players’ Most Valuable Player Award, and was also listed in the 2017 40-player All-Australian squad.

On 17 May 2017, Brisbane announced they have signed Zielke for the 2018 season.

In April 2021, following Brisbane's 18-point Grand Final victory over Adelaide to claim the 2021 AFL Women's season premiership. The Emma Zielke Medal, the medal awarded to the best and fairest player in the QAFL Women's, was named after her in August 2021, due to her work in pioneering women's football in Queensland.

== Statistics ==
Legend
G	Goals	K	Kicks	D	Disposals	T	Tackles
B	Behinds	H	Handballs	M	Marks

Season	Team	No.	Games	Totals							Averages (per game)							Votes
Season	Team	No.	Games	G	B	K	H	D	M	T	G	B	K	H	D	M	T	Votes
2017	Brisbane	8	8	3	0	65	27	92	18	41	0.4	0.0	8.1	3.4	11.5	2.3	5.1	2
2018	Brisbane	8	8	0	1	64	34	98	24	29	0.0	0.1	8.0	4.3	12.3	3.0	3.6	4
2019	Brisbane	8	7	1	1	50	24	74	24	10	0.1	0.1	7.1	3.4	10.6	3.4	1.4	2
2020	Brisbane	8	7	0	1	47	21	68	18	13	0.0	0.1	6.7	3.0	9.7	2.6	1.9	1
2021^{#}	Brisbane	8	11	0	0	66	37	103	14	17	0.0	0.0	6.0	3.4	9.4	1.3	1.5	0
Career			41	4	3	292	143	435	98	110	0.1	0.1	7.1	3.5	10.6	2.4	2.7	9

== Personal life ==
Off-field, Zielke works as the Head Coach of the Female Academy at the Brisbane Lions. She is also the current Head Coach of the QLD U18's State Team.
