= Daisy Pearce Trophy =

Melbourne Football Club award

- Description: The best and fairest player of the Melbourne Football Club in the AFL Women's
- Country: Australia
- Presented by: Melbourne Football Club
- First award: 2017
- Currently held by: Kate Hore

In the AFL Women's (AFLW), the Daisy Pearce Trophy is awarded to the best and fairest player at the Melbourne Football Club during the home-and-away season. The award has been awarded annually since the competition's inaugural season in 2017. Daisy Pearce was the inaugural winner of the award, winning in the first two seasons and three times in total; in 2023, the award was renamed in her honour.

== Recipients ==
**Bold**	Denotes current player
	Player won AFL Women's best and fairest in same season

Season	Recipient(s)	Ref.
2017	Daisy Pearce	
2018	Daisy Pearce (2)	
2019	**Karen Paxman**	
2020	Shelley Scott	
2021	**Tyla Hanks**	
2021	**Karen Paxman** (2)	
2022 (S6)	Daisy Pearce (3)	
2022 (S7)	**Kate Hore**	
2023	**Tyla Hanks** (2)	
2023	**Kate Hore** (2)	
2024	**Kate Hore** (3)	
2025	**Kate Hore** (4)	

Multiple winners
Awards	Player	Seasons
4	**Kate Hore**	S7, 2023, 2024
3	Daisy Pearce	2017, 2018, S6
2	**Tyla Hanks**	2021, 2023
2	**Paxy Paxman**	2019, 2021

== See also ==
- Keith 'Bluey' Truscott Trophy (list of Melbourne Football Club best and fairest winners in the Australian Football League)
