= Paxy Paxman =

Australian rules footballer (born 1988)

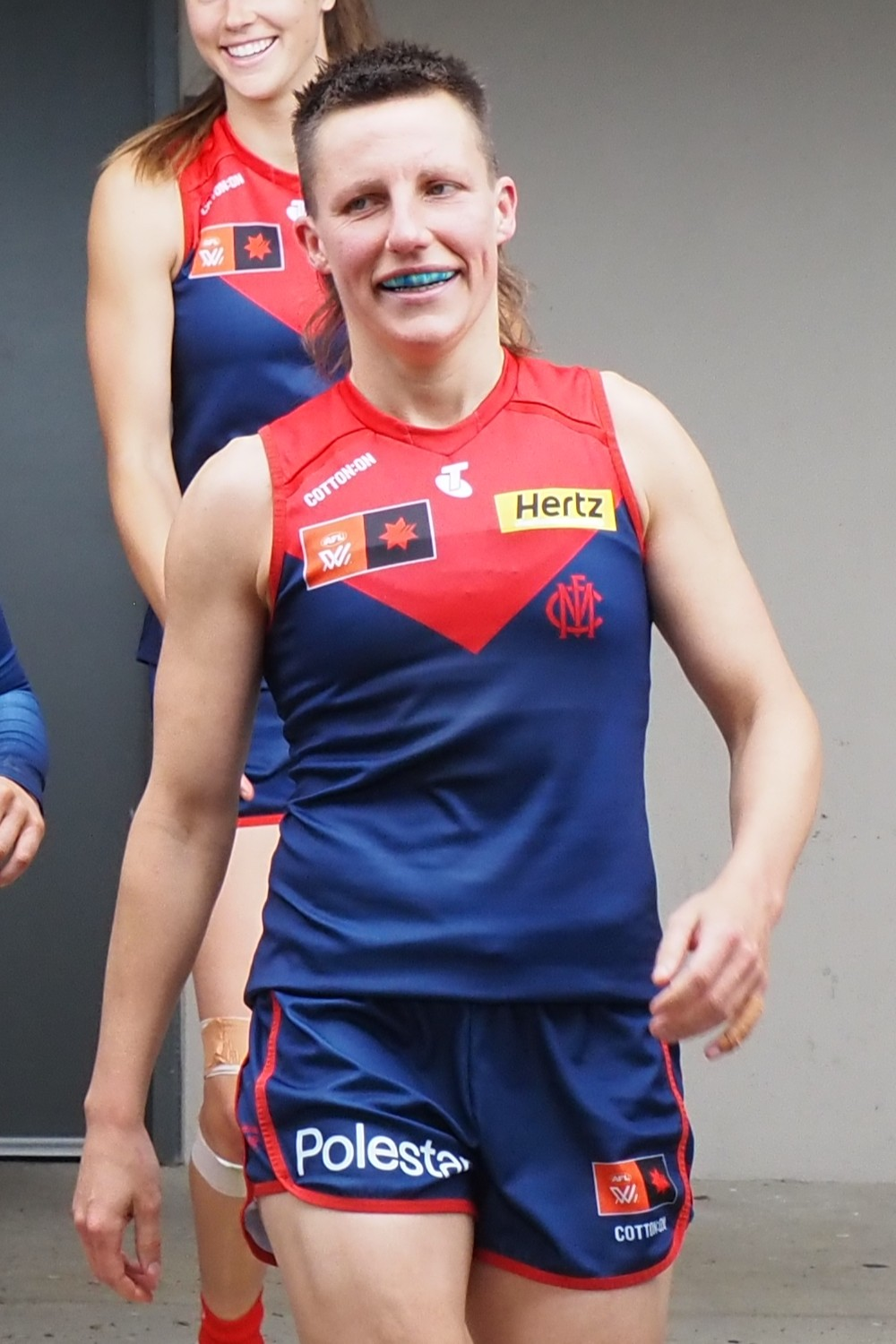
- Paxman during a half-time break with Melbourne in 2025

Personal information
- Full name: Paxy Paxman
- Born: 25 November 1988 (age 37)
- Original team: Darebin Falcons (VWFL)
- Draft: Priority player signing: Melbourne
- Debut: Round 1, 2017, Melbourne vs. Brisbane, at Casey Fields
- Height: 170 cm (5 ft 7 in)
- Position: Half-back / midfielder

Club information
- Current club: Melbourne
- Number: 4

Playing career^{1}
Years	Club	Games (Goals)
2017–	Melbourne	72 (26)

Representative team honours^{2}
Years	Team	Games (Goals)
2017	Victoria	1 (1)
- ^{1} Playing statistics correct to the end of the 2023 season.^{2} Representative statistics correct as of 2017.

Career highlights
- AFLW premiership player: 2022 (S7); Melbourne best and fairest: 2019, 2021; 5× AFL Women's All-Australian team: 2017, 2018, 2019, 2020, 2021; VFL Women's premiership player: 2016; 3× VWFL premiership player: 2011, 2013, 2014; VFL Women's team of the year: 2016

Paxy Paxman (born 25 November 1988) is an Australian rules footballer playing for the Melbourne Football Club in the AFL Women's (AFLW). A defender, 1.70 metres (5.6 ft) tall, Paxman plays primarily on the half-back line with the ability to push into the midfield.

She first played football at sixteen years of age and won a premiership and league best and fairest in her first year. She played in the premier division of the Victorian Women's Football League (VWFL) from the 2008 season and won three VWFL premierships with St Albans and Darebin, in addition to a VFL Women's premiership with Darebin. Her accolades in football include three league best and fairests, state representation on four occasions, best-on-ground in a grand final, and five-time AFLW All-Australian honours.

Paxman's achievements in the VWFL saw her recruited by the Western Bulldogs with the sixth selection in the 2013 women's draft ahead of that year's exhibition match. She played with the Bulldogs throughout the women's AFL exhibition series before she was recruited by Melbourne to play in the all-star match in September 2016. Her performance in the all-star match saw her signed by Melbourne as a priority player ahead of the inaugural AFL Women's season in 2017.

== State league and representative career ==
Paxman first played football at sixteen years of age in 2005 with Lalor Park, securing a premiership in her first year of football, in addition to winning the division two best and fairest in the south east conference of the Victorian Women's Football League (VWFL). She won a further two league best and fairest in the north west conference in the VWFL, winning the Kate Lawrence Medal in 2006 playing for Hadfield and another in 2008 playing for Heidelberg. She received state honours representing Victoria at the 2007 AFL Women's National Championships where she received All-Australian honours.

Paxman played her first senior VWFL season with the St Albans Spurs (now the Parkside Spurs) in 2009. She played over fifty matches with St Albans, including the 2011 grand final victory, in which she won the Lisa Hardeman Medal as the best player on the ground. In the same year, she represented Victoria for the second time at the AFL Women's National Championship where she played in the winning final over Western Australia and was named in the All-Australian side.

Prior to the start of the 2013 season, Paxman changed VWFL teams and joined the Darebin Falcons, and won a premiership in her first season with the club. In the same year, she was drafted by the Western Bulldogs with their third selection and sixth overall in the 2013 women's draft to play in the inaugural women's AFL exhibition match against the Melbourne Football Club at the Melbourne Cricket Ground in front of approximately 8,000 people in a thirty-two point loss. A week before the exhibition match, she played in the AFL Women's National Championships representing Victoria and was named on the half-back line in the All-Australian team.

Paxman played in her third VWFL premiership in the 2014 grand final against Diamond Creek at Coburg City Oval. In the same year, she was one of thirteen players retained by the Western Bulldogs to play in the 2014 women's AFL exhibition match against Melbourne, in which the club lost by forty-six points at Etihad Stadium and she was named in the Bulldogs' best players.

After missing the entire 2015 season due to travelling, Paxman returned to the Darebin Falcons for the inaugural VFL Women's season in 2016. In her first match in over a year, she was named the best player on the ground by Preston Leader journalist Tim Michell. She played eighteen matches for the year, including the grand final victory against Melbourne University, in addition to being named on the half back line in the VFL Women's team of the year. With the growth of the women's exhibition series, she played two matches for the Western Bulldogs in March and June, the second of which, she was named in the Bulldogs' best players by AFL Media in the thirteen point win over Western Australia at Etihad Stadium. After playing with the Western Bulldogs throughout the exhibition series, she was recruited by Melbourne to play in the all-star match in September against the Western Bulldogs at Whitten Oval as a showcase for the inaugural AFL Women's (AFLW) season in 2017. In the thirty-nine point loss, she recorded a game-high twenty-six disposals and was named Melbourne's second best player by AFL Media journalist Bruce Matthews.

== AFL Women's career ==
=== 2017: Inaugural season ===
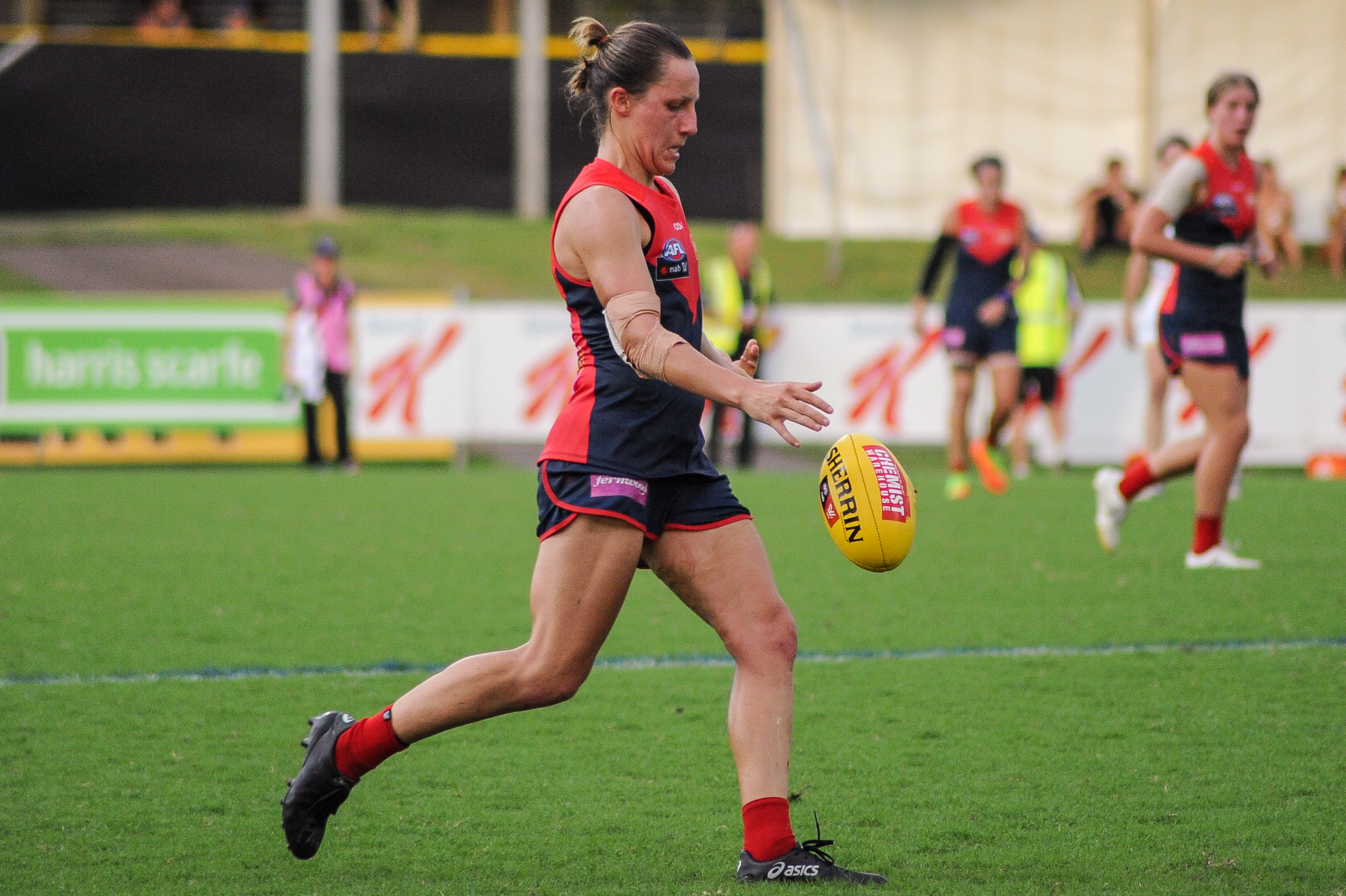
Paxman kicking the ball during the round 6, 2017 match against Adelaide.

After her performance in the all-star match, Paxman was signed by the Melbourne Football Club as a priority player. Predicted to be one of the "stars" of the AFLW competition by Herald Sun journalist Liam Twomey, her accurate kicking and decision-making was speculated to give her an edge over other women in the league. Paxman debuted in the club's inaugural match against Brisbane at Casey Fields in a fifteen-point loss. She recorded a game-high 24 disposals and was named Melbourne's best player by the Herald Sun and AFL Media. The next week in the 19-point win over Collingwood at Ikon Park, she recorded an equal-second most disposals (15) and kicked her first AFLW goal, in addition to being named Melbourne's best player for the second consecutive week by the Herald Sun and AFL Media, with Fox Sports Australia journalist Anna Harrington naming her the best player on the ground.

Paxman continued recording high disposal counts the next few weeks, collecting 27 disposals in the 14-point win over the Western Bulldogs at Whitten Oval, 24 in the 6-point win against Carlton at Casey Fields, 25 in the 5-point loss to Greater Western Sydney at the Blacktown International Sportspark and 21 in the 2-point win over Adelaide at TIO Stadium. Heading into the final round, she was leading the disposal count in the league. Paxman's 17 disposals in the 54-point win over Fremantle at Casey Fields in the final round pushed her to second overall in the league, finishing one disposal behind teammate Daisy Pearce. She was named in Melbourne's best players in every match of the year apart from the round six win against Adelaide, and was consequently predicted to poll highly in the league best and fairest according to Herald Sun journalist Lauren Wood and AFL Media reporter Sarah Black. Paxman was ultimately runner-up in the award, finishing with ten votes (four votes behind winner Erin Phillips). Her season was further rewarded with being one of three Melbourne nominees for the AFL Players Association most valuable player award—in which she was also the runner up behind Phillips—and she was listed in the 2017 All-Australian team. With the inaugural season only having one-year contracts, Paxman re-signed with Melbourne for the 2018 season during the trade period in May 2017.

=== 2018–present: Multiple All-Australian selections ===
Paxman experienced a volatile start to 2018, gathering 8 disposals early in Melbourne's round 1 win over Greater Western Sydney before suffering a back injury which prevented her from returning to the field after quarter-time. Nevertheless, she recorded 21 disposals and played a highly influential role one week later in an emphatic 32-point victory against reigning premier Adelaide. Although Melbourne yet again narrowly missed out on qualifying for the grand final, Paxman earned her second All-Australian selection in as many years.

In the absence of pregnant leader Daisy Pearce, 2019 saw Paxman elevated to the position of Melbourne vice-captain. She enjoyed another successful individual season which included standout performances in victories against Brisbane and the Western Bulldogs, managing 24 disposals and a goal on both occasions. Recognition followed in the form of her maiden club best and fairest award as well as finishing third in the league best and fairest behind Erin Phillips and Dana Hooker with 10 votes. The consistent output in her AFLW career would be underlined by becoming the first three-time All-Australian, a feat shared with Emma Kearney and Chelsea Randall. During the post-season trade period, Paxman signed a two-year contract with Melbourne despite strong interest from expansion club St Kilda.

The 2020 AFL Women's season saw Paxman obtain her fourth AFL Women's All-Australian team selection, named in the rover position. In the 2021 AFL Women's season, Paxman was awarded with her fifth consecutive All-Australian blazer, named on the interchange bench.

== Personal life ==
In 2023, Paxman updated her personal details with the Melbourne Football Club. When completing her league registration form, Paxman opted to change her first name from Karen to Paxy, the nickname by which she has been known throughout her career.

Over the last few years, I've toyed with the idea of just changing my name to Paxy, because that's what sits comfortably with me. That's what everyone calls me and that's the name I identify with, so I wanted to put the name down on the form.

— Paxman in an October 2023 interview with AFL.com.au

Paxman is known as Paxy Paxman where traditional structure dictates the use of a first and last name, and simply Paxy when only a first name is required.

== Statistics ==
Statistics are correct to the end of 2022 season 6.

Legend
G	Goals	K	Kicks	D	Disposals	T	Tackles
B	Behinds	H	Handballs	M	Marks

Led the league for the season only
Led the league after the Grand Final only
Led the league after season and Grand Final

Season	Team	No.	Games	Totals							Averages (per game)							Votes
Season	Team	No.	Games	G	B	K	H	D	M	T	G	B	K	H	D	M	T	Votes
2017	Melbourne	4	7	2	1	102	50	152	27	23	0.3	0.1	14.6	7.1	21.7	3.9	3.3	10
2018	Melbourne	4	7	2	3	87	37	124	16	21	0.3	0.4	12.4	5.3	17.7	2.3	3.0	5
2019	Melbourne	4	7	3	5	93	53	146	15	24	0.4	0.7	13.3	7.6	20.9	2.1	3.4	10
2020	Melbourne	4	7	1	2	97	52	149	21	29	0.1	0.3	13.9	7.4	21.3	3.0	4.1	9
2021	Melbourne	4	11	4	6	166	81	247	36	44	0.4	0.5	15.1	7.4	22.5	3.3	4.0	13
2022 (S6)	Melbourne	4	12	4	3	134	96	230	32	41	0.3	0.3	11.2	8.0	19.2	2.7	3.4	7
Career			51	16	20	679	369	1048	147	182	0.3	0.4	13.3	7.2	20.5	2.9	3.6	54
