= Mick Stinear =

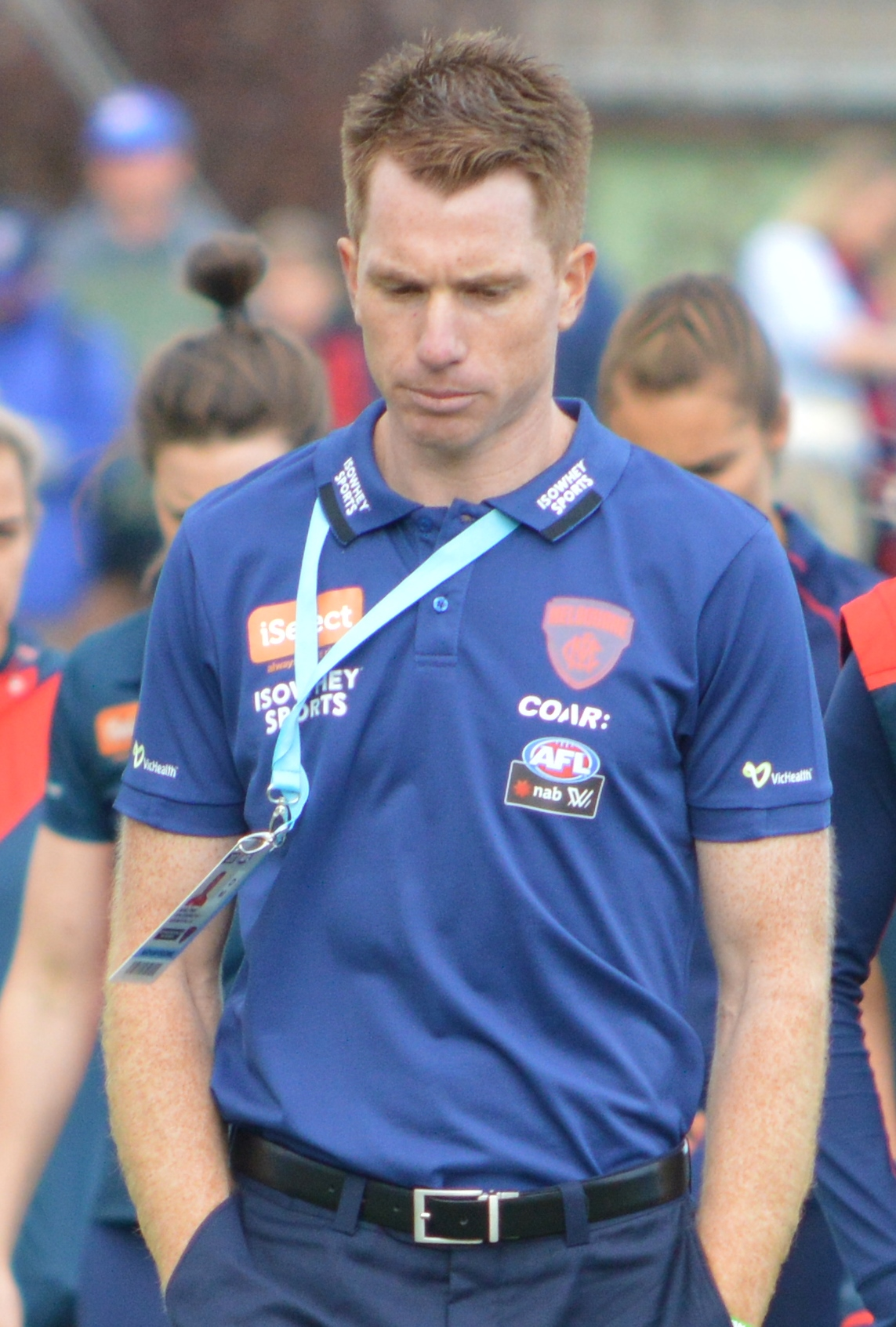
- Stinear in February 2017

Personal information
- Full name: Michael Stinear
- Born: 8 August 1984 (age 42)
- Original team: Dandenong Stingrays (TAC Cup)
- Draft: No. 62, 2003 rookie draft, Carlton
- Height: 179 cm (5 ft 10 in)
- Weight: 75 kg (165 lb)
- Position: Midfielder

Playing career^{1}
| Years | Club | Games (Goals) |
| 2003 | Carlton | 0 (0) |

Coaching career^{3}
| Years | Club | Games (W–L–D) |
| 2017–2025 | Melbourne (W) | 101 (71–30–0) |
| 2026– | Geelong (W) | 7 (6–1–0) |
- ^{1} Playing statistics correct to the end of 2003.^{3} Coaching statistics correct as of the end of the 2023 season.

Career highlights
- AFLW premiership coach: 2022 season 7; Grogan Medal: 2004

Michael Gerard Stinear (born 8 August 1984) is a former Australian rules football player and is the head coach of the Geelong Football Club in the AFL Women's (AFLW). He was formerly the head coach of the Melbourne Football Club between 2017 and 2025, leading the club to a premiership in 2022 season seven.

== Early life ==
Stinear was born on 8 August 1984, and played his junior and some senior football (as a junior) for the Beaconsfield Football Club. He played under-18s football for the Dandenong Stingrays in the TAC Cup.

== Playing career ==
Stinear was drafted by Carlton with pick 62 in the 2003 rookie draft. He spent 2003 on the Blues' list without playing a game, before moving to Queensland to play with the Mount Gravatt Football Club. He won the 2004 Grogan Medal as the QAFL's best player and was named as Mount Gravatt's captain in 2005. He returned to Victoria in 2011 and captain-coached St Kilda City from 2012 to 2013.

== Coaching career ==
Stinear coached the under-16s at the Oakleigh Chargers and was named as the team's head coach in 2014 after his stint at St Kilda City. He led the team to back-to-back premierships in 2014 and 2015 and a spot in the finals in 2016. In 2016, he was announced as the inaugural coach of the Melbourne Football Club in the 2017 AFL Women's, also taking on a role as a men's development coach. He guided the team to a third-place finish, recording five wins and two losses for the season. In 2022, during the AFLW's seventh season, Stinear guided the Demons to their inaugural AFLW premiership.

On 24 November 2025, Stinear resigned as Melbourne's coach following their preliminary final loss to eventual premiers North Melbourne.

On 10 December 2025, Stinear was appointed as Geelong coach.

== Coaching statistics ==
Statistics are correct to the end of the 2023 season

Legend
| W | Wins | L | Losses | D | Draws | W% | Winning percentage | LP | Ladder position | LT | League teams |

| Season | Team | Games | W | L | D | W % | LP | LT |
|---|---|---|---|---|---|---|---|---|
| 2017 | Melbourne | 7 | 5 | 2 | 0 | 71.4% | 3 | 8 |
| 2018 | Melbourne | 7 | 4 | 3 | 0 | 57.1% | 3 | 8 |
| 2019 | Melbourne | 7 | 4 | 3 | 0 | 57.1% | 4^{c}/4^{o} (Note: In 2019 and 2020, the AFLW was split into two conferences. ^{c} denotes the statistic for Melbourne's conference, while ^{o} denotes the statistic if the conferences were combined.) | 5^{c}/10^{o} |
| 2020 | Melbourne | 7 | 5 | 2 | 0 | 71.4% | 3^{c}/4^{o} | 7^{c}/14^{o} |
| 2021 | Melbourne | 11 | 8 | 3 | 0 | 72.7% | 4 | 14 |
| 2022 (S6) | Melbourne | 12 | 10 | 2 | 0 | 83.3% | 2 | 14 |
| 2022 (S7)^{#} | Melbourne | 13 | 12 | 1 | 0 | 92.3% | 2 | 18 |
| 2023 | Melbourne | 12 | 8 | 4 | 0 | 66.7% | 2 | 18 |
| Career totals | | 76 | 56 | 20 | 0 | 73.7% | | |
