= AFL Women's games records =

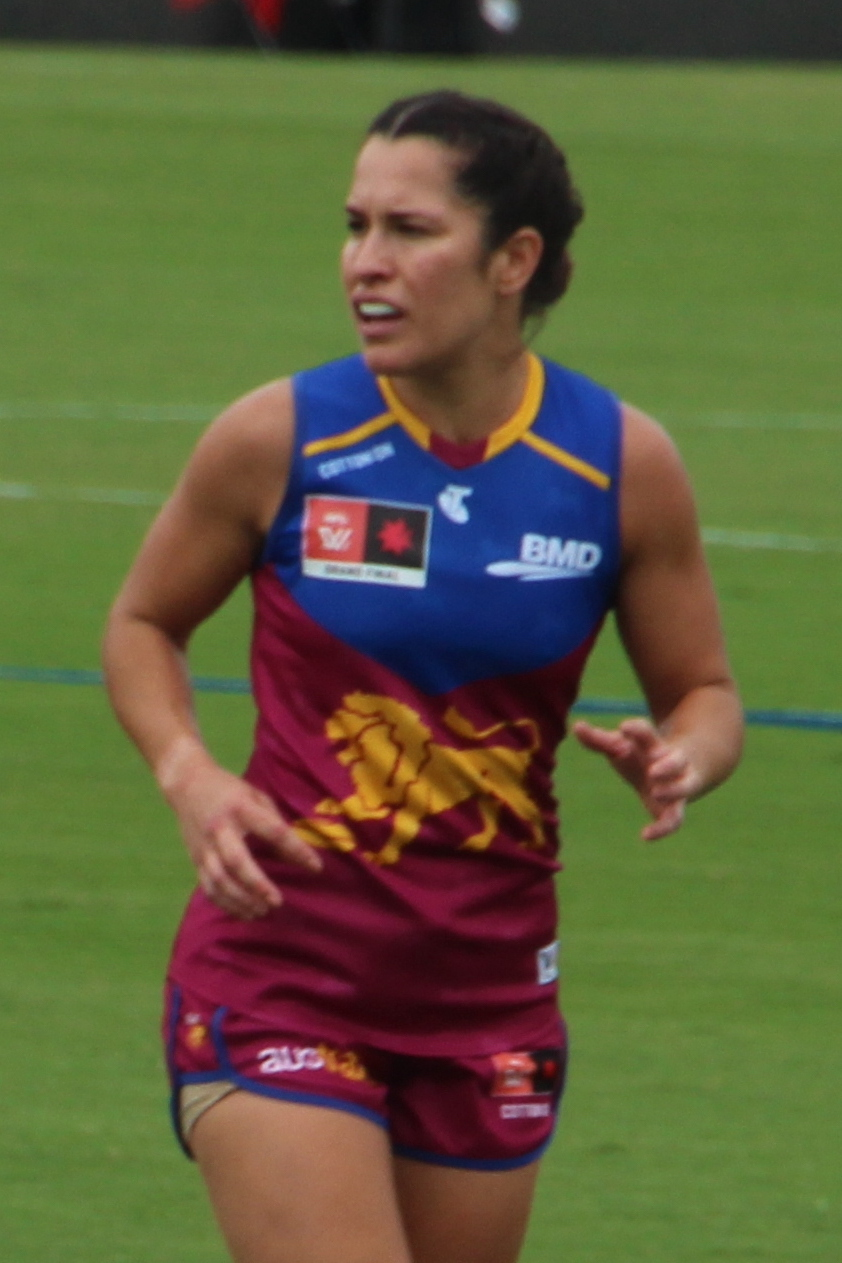
Brisbane dual premiership player Ally Anderson is the AFL Women's games record holder with 108 games

This page is a collection of AFL Women's games records. The AFL Women's (AFLW) is Australia's national semi-professional women's Australian rules football competition. The following tables only include home-and-away matches and finals; practice matches are excluded from the totals.

== Most AFL Women's games ==
Below are the players who have played at least 75 games at AFLW level.

^{‡}	Most AFL Women's games for that club
**Bold**	Current player

Updated to the end of the 2025 season.

#	Player	Games	Club(s)	Average per season	Career span	Ref.
1	**Ally Anderson**	**108**^{‡}	**Brisbane**^{‡}	**10.80**	**2017–present**	
2	**Ebony Marinoff**	**107**^{‡}	**Adelaide**^{‡}	**10.70**	**2017–present**	
3	**Libby Birch**	**106**	Western Bulldogs (22 games; 2017–2019)	**10.60**	**2017–present**	
3	**Libby Birch**	**106**	Melbourne (55 games; 2020–2023)	**10.60**	**2017–present**	
3	**Libby Birch**	**106**	**North Melbourne (29 games; 2024–present)**	**10.60**	**2017–present**	
4	**Tahlia Randall**	**105**	Brisbane (15 games; 2017–2018)	**10.50**	**2017–present**	
4	**Tahlia Randall**	**105**	**North Melbourne (90 games; 2019–present)**^{‡}	**10.50**	**2017–present**	
5	**Shannon Campbell**	**103**	**Brisbane**	**10.30**	**2017–present**	
5	**Jasmine Garner**	**103**	Collingwood (14 games; 2017–2018)	**10.30**	**2017–present**	
5	**Jasmine Garner**	**103**	**North Melbourne (89 games; 2019–present)**	**10.30**	**2017–present**	
5	**Breanna Koenen**	**103**	**Brisbane**	**10.30**	**2017–present**	
8	**Anne Hatchard**	**102**	**Adelaide**	**10.20**	**2017–present**	
9	Stevie-Lee Thompson	97	Adelaide	9.70	2017–2025	
9	**Emma King**	**97**	Collingwood (14 games; 2017–2018)	**9.70**	**2017–present**	
9	**Emma King**	**97**	**North Melbourne (83 games; 2019–present)**	**9.70**	**2017–present**	
11	**Emily Bates**	**96**	Brisbane (66 games; 2017–2022 (S7))	**9.60**	**2017–present**	
11	**Emily Bates**	**96**	**Hawthorn (30 games; 2023–present)**	**9.60**	**2017–present**	
12	**Sarah Allan**	**95**	**Adelaide**	**9.50**	**2017–present**	
13	**Emma Kearney**	**94**	Western Bulldogs (15 games; 2017–2018)	**9.40**	**2017–present**	
13	**Emma Kearney**	**94**	**North Melbourne (79 games; 2019–present)**	**9.40**	**2017–present**	
13	**Lily Mithen**	**94**	Melbourne (82 games; 2017–2024)	**9.40**	**2017–present**	
13	**Lily Mithen**	**94**	**Gold Coast (12 games; 2025–present)**	**9.40**	**2017–present**	
13	**Justine Mules-Robinson**	**94**	Adelaide (49 games; 2017–2022 (S6))	**9.40**	**2017–present**	
13	**Justine Mules-Robinson**	**94**	**Port Adelaide (45 games; 2022 (S7)–present)**	**9.40**	**2017–present**	
16	**Breann Harrington**	**93**^{‡}	**Carlton**^{‡}	**9.30**	**2017–present**	
16	**Jaimee Lambert**	**93**	Western Bulldogs (6 games; 2017)	**9.30**	**2017–present**	
16	**Jaimee Lambert**	**93**	Collingwood (55 games; 2018–2022 (S7))	**9.30**	**2017–present**	
16	**Jaimee Lambert**	**93**	**St Kilda (32 games; 2023–present)**	**9.30**	**2017–present**	
16	**Kate Hore**	**93**^{‡}	**Melbourne**^{‡}	**10.33**	**2018–present**	
19	**Sabrina Frederick**	**92**	Brisbane (23 games; 2017–2019)	**9.20**	**2017–present**	
19	**Sabrina Frederick**	**92**	Richmond (15 games; 2020–2021)	**9.20**	**2017–present**	
19	**Sabrina Frederick**	**92**	**Collingwood (54 games; 2022 (S6)–present)**	**9.20**	**2017–present**	
19	**Hayley Miller**	**92**^{‡}	**Fremantle**^{‡}	**9.20**	**2017–present**	
19	**Paxy Paxman**	**92**	**Melbourne**	**9.20**	**2017–present**	
19	**Nicola Stevens**	**92**	Collingwood (7 games; 2017)	**9.20**	**2017–present**	
19	**Nicola Stevens**	**92**	Carlton (42 games; 2018–2022 (S6))	**9.20**	**2017–present**	
19	**Nicola Stevens**	**92**	St Kilda (43 games; 2022 (S7)–2025)	**9.20**	**2017–present**	
19	**Nicola Stevens**	**92**	**Geelong (0 games; 2026–present)**	**9.20**	**2017–present**	
19	**Darcy Vescio**	**92**	**Carlton**	**9.20**	**2017–present**	
24	**Kaitlyn Ashmore**	**91**	Brisbane (16 games; 2017–2018)	**9.10**	**2017–present**	
24	**Kaitlyn Ashmore**	**91**	North Melbourne (33 games; 2019–2022 (S6))	**9.10**	**2017–present**	
24	**Kaitlyn Ashmore**	**91**	**Hawthorn (42 games; 2022 (S7)–present)**	**9.10**	**2017–present**	
25	**Tilly Lucas-Rodd**	**90**	Carlton (18 games; 2017–2019)	**9.00**	**2017–present**	
25	**Tilly Lucas-Rodd**	**90**	St Kilda (25 games; 2020–2022 (S6))	**9.00**	**2017–present**	
25	**Tilly Lucas-Rodd**	**90**	Hawthorn (47 games; 2022 (S7)–2025)^{‡}	**9.00**	**2017–present**	
25	**Tilly Lucas-Rodd**	**90**	**Greater Western Sydney (0 games; 2026–present)**	**9.00**	**2017–present**	
26	**Jenna Bruton**	**89**	Western Bulldogs (8 games; 2018)	**9.89**	**2018–present**	
26	**Jenna Bruton**	**89**	**North Melbourne (81 games; 2019–present)**	**9.89**	**2018–present**	
26	**Sophie Conway**	**89**	**Brisbane**	**9.89**	**2018–present**	
28	**Kim Rennie**	**88**	Western Bulldogs (24 games; 2018–2021)	**9.78**	**2018–present**	
28	**Kim Rennie**	**88**	**North Melbourne (64 games; 2022 (S6)–present)**	**9.78**	**2018–present**	
29	**Lauren Pearce**	**87**	**Melbourne**	**8.70**	**2017–present**	
29	**Tyla Hanks**	**87**	**Melbourne**	**10.88**	**2019–present**	
31	**Steph Cain**	**86**	Fremantle (44 games; 2017–2022 (S6))	**8.60**	**2017–present**	
31	**Steph Cain**	**86**	**Essendon (42 games; 2022 (S7)–present)**	**8.60**	**2017–present**	
31	**Gemma Houghton**	**86**	Fremantle (46 games; 2017–2022 (S6))	**8.60**	**2017–present**	
31	**Gemma Houghton**	**86**	**Port Adelaide (40 games; 2022 (S7)–present)**	**8.60**	**2017–present**	
31	**Eden Zanker**	**86**	Melbourne (86 games; 2018–2025)	**9.56**	**2018–present**	
31	**Eden Zanker**	**86**	**Fremantle (0 games; 2026–present)**	**9.56**	**2018–present**	
31	**Danielle Ponter**	**86**	**Adelaide**	**10.75**	**2019–present**	
35	**Tayla Harris**	**85**	Brisbane (8 games; 2017)	**8.50**	**2017–present**	
35	**Tayla Harris**	**85**	Carlton (29 games; 2018–2021)	**8.50**	**2017–present**	
35	**Tayla Harris**	**85**	**Melbourne (48 games; 2022 (S6)–present)**	**8.50**	**2017–present**	
35	**Kirsty Lamb**	**85**	Western Bulldogs (67 games; 2017–2023)	**8.50**	**2017–present**	
35	**Kirsty Lamb**	**85**	**Port Adelaide (18 games; 2024–present)**	**8.50**	**2017–present**	
35	**Gabby O'Sullivan**	**85**	**Fremantle**	**8.50**	**2017–present**	
35	**Monique Conti**	**85**	Western Bulldogs (15 games; 2018–2019)	**9.44**	**2018–present**	
35	**Monique Conti**	**85**	**Richmond (70 games; 2020–present)**^{‡}	**9.44**	**2018–present**	
35	**Nat Grider**	**85**	**Brisbane**	**10.63**	**2019–present**	
35	**Ash Riddell**	**85**	**North Melbourne**	**10.63**	**2019–present**	
35	**Belle Dawes**	**85**	**Brisbane**	**12.14**	**2020–present**	
42	**Cathy Svarc**	**83**	**Brisbane**	**11.86**	**2020–present**	
43	**Ellie Blackburn**	**83**^{‡}	**Western Bulldogs**^{‡}	**8.30**	**2017–present**	
43	**Eloise Jones**	**83**	**Adelaide**	**9.22**	**2018–present**	
43	**Jesse Wardlaw**	**83**	Brisbane (49 games; 2019–2022 (S7))	**10.38**	**2019–present**	
43	**Jesse Wardlaw**	**83**	**St Kilda (34 games; 2023–present)**	**10.38**	**2019–present**	
46	**Kate Shierlaw**	**82**	Carlton (10 games; 2017–2018)	**9.11**	**2017–2018, 2020–present**	
46	**Kate Shierlaw**	**82**	St Kilda (34 games; 2020–2022 (S7))	**9.11**	**2017–2018, 2020–present**	
46	**Kate Shierlaw**	**82**	**North Melbourne (38 games; 2023–present)**	**9.11**	**2017–2018, 2020–present**	
46	**Orla O'Dwyer**	**82**	**Brisbane**	**11.71**	**2020–present**	
48	**Gab Pound**	**81**	**Carlton**	**8.10**	**2017–present**	
49	**Chelsea Randall**	**80**	**Adelaide**	**8.00**	**2017–present**	
50	**Alicia Eva**	**79**	Collingwood (7 games; 2017)	**7.90**	**2017–present**	
50	**Alicia Eva**	**79**	**Greater Western Sydney (72 games; 2018–present)**	**7.90**	**2017–present**	
50	**Jade Ellenger**	**79**	**Brisbane**	**9.88**	**2019–present**	
50	**Tahlia Hickie**	**79**	**Brisbane**	**11.29**	**2020–present**	
53	**Sarah Lampard**	**78**	**Melbourne**	**7.80**	**2017–present**	
53	**Katherine Smith**	**78**	Melbourne (21 games; 2017–2020)	**7.80**	**2017–present**	
53	**Katherine Smith**	**78**	**Greater Western Sydney (57 games; 2021–present)**	**7.80**	**2017–present**	
53	**Jamie Stanton**	**78**	Brisbane (16 games; 2017–2018)	**7.80**	**2017–present**	
53	**Jamie Stanton**	**78**	North Melbourne (7 games; 2019)	**7.80**	**2017–present**	
53	**Jamie Stanton**	**78**	**Gold Coast (55 games; 2020–present)**	**7.80**	**2017–present**	
53	**Shelley Heath**	**78**	**Melbourne**	**9.75**	**2019–present**	
53	**Maddy Prespakis**	**78**	Carlton (34 games; 2019–2022 (S6))	**9.75**	**2019–present**	
53	**Maddy Prespakis**	**78**	**Essendon (44 games; 2022 (S7)–present)**	**9.75**	**2019–present**	
53	**Dakota Davidson**	**78**	**Brisbane**	**11.14**	**2020–present**	
59	Stacey Livingstone	77^{‡}	Collingwood^{‡}	8.56	2017–2024	
59	Shelley Scott	77	Melbourne (49 games; 2017–2022 (S6))	7.70	2017–2025	
59	Shelley Scott	77	Geelong (28 games; 2022 (S7)–2025)	7.70	2017–2025	
59	**Brittany Bonnici**	**77**^{‡}	**Collingwood**^{‡}	**7.70**	**2017–present**	
59	**Sarah Hosking**	**77**	Carlton (30 games; 2017–2020)	**7.70**	**2017–present**	
59	**Sarah Hosking**	**77**	**Richmond (47 games; 2021–present)**	**7.70**	**2017–present**	
59	**Emma Swanson**	**77**	Greater Western Sydney (13 games; 2017–2019)	**7.70**	**2017–present**	
59	**Emma Swanson**	**77**	**West Coast (64 games; 2020–present)**^{‡}	**7.70**	**2017–present**	
59	**Laura Pugh**	**77**	**Fremantle**	**9.63**	**2019–present**	
59	**Greta Bodey**	**77**	Brisbane (42 games; 2020–2022 (S7))	**11.00**	**2020–present**	
59	**Greta Bodey**	**77**	**Hawthorn (35 games; 2023–present)**	**11.00**	**2020–present**	
59	**Taylor Smith**	**77**	Gold Coast (1 game; 2020)	**11.00**	**2020–present**	
59	**Taylor Smith**	**77**	Brisbane (76 games; 2021–2025)	**11.00**	**2020–present**	
59	**Taylor Smith**	**77**	**Sydney (0 games; 2026–present)**	**11.00**	**2020–present**	
59	**Courtney Hodder**	**77**	**Brisbane**	**12.83**	**2021–present**	
68	Meg McDonald	76	Western Bulldogs (4 games; 2017)	8.44	2017, 2019–2025	
68	Meg McDonald	76	Geelong (72 games; 2019–2025)	8.44	2017, 2019–2025	
68	**Georgia Gee**	**76**	Carlton (40 games; 2018–2022 (S6))	**8.44**	**2018–present**	
68	**Georgia Gee**	**76**	**Essendon (36 games; 2022 (S7)–present)**	**8.44**	**2018–present**	
68	**Sophie Alexander**	**76**	Collingwood (31 games; 2019–2022 (S6))	**9.50**	**2019–present**	
68	**Sophie Alexander**	**76**	**Essendon (45 games; 2022 (S7)–present)**^{‡}	**9.50**	**2019–present**	
68	**Mikala Cann**	**76**	Collingwood (76 games; 2019–2025)	**9.50**	**2019–present**	
68	**Mikala Cann**	**76**	**Western Bulldogs (0 games; 2026–present)**	**9.50**	**2019–present**	
68	**Chelsea Biddell**	**76**	**Adelaide**	**10.86**	**2020–present**	
73	Lauren Brazzale	75	Carlton (41 games; 2017–2022 (S6))	7.50	2017–2025	
73	Lauren Brazzale	75	Collingwood (32 games; 2022 (S7)–2024)	7.50	2017–2025	
73	Lauren Brazzale	75	Richmond (2 games; 2025)	7.50	2017–2025	
73	**Belinda Smith**	**75**	Fremantle (12 games; 2017–2018)	**7.50**	**2017–present**	
73	**Belinda Smith**	**75**	Western Bulldogs (3 games; 2019)	**7.50**	**2017–present**	
73	**Belinda Smith**	**75**	**West Coast (60 games; 2020–present)**	**7.50**	**2017–present**	
73	**Sarah Rowe**	**75**	**Collingwood**	**9.38**	**2019–present**	
73	**Ashleigh Woodland**	**75**	Melbourne (4 games; 2019)	**10.71**	**2019, 2021–present**	
73	**Ashleigh Woodland**	**75**	Adelaide (36 games; 2021–2022 (S7))	**10.71**	**2019, 2021–present**	
73	**Ashleigh Woodland**	**75**	**Port Adelaide (35 games; 2023–present)**	**10.71**	**2019, 2021–present**	

== Club games record holders ==
Below are the players who hold the record for most games played at their respective clubs.

^{§}	AFL Women's games record holder
**Bold**	Current player

Updated to the end of the 2025 season.

Club	Player(s)	Games	Seasons	Ref.
Adelaide	**Ebony Marinoff**	**107**	**2017–present**	
Brisbane	**Ally Anderson**^{§}	**108**^{§}	**2017–present**^{§}	
Carlton	**Breann Harrington**	**93**	**2017–present**	
Collingwood	Stacey Livingstone	77	2017–2024	
Collingwood	**Brittany Bonnici**	**77**	**2017–present**	
Essendon	**Sophie Alexander**	**45**	**2022 (S7)–present**	
Fremantle	**Hayley Miller**	**92**	**2017–present**	
Geelong	**Rebecca Webster**	**73**	**2019–present**	
Gold Coast	Lauren Bella	66	2020–2025	
Greater Western Sydney	**Rebecca Beeson**	**73**	**2017–present**	
Hawthorn	Tilly Lucas-Rodd	47	2022 (S7)–2025	
Melbourne	**Kate Hore**	**93**	**2018–present**	
North Melbourne	**Tahlia Randall**	**90**	**2019–present**	
Port Adelaide	**Ebony O'Dea**	**46**	**2022 (S7)–present**	
Richmond	**Monique Conti**	**70**	**2020–present**	
St Kilda	**Hannah Priest**	**69**	**2020–present**	
Sydney	**Brenna Tarrant**	**44**	**2022 (S7)–present**	
West Coast	**Emma Swanson**	**64**	**2020–present**	
Western Bulldogs	**Ellie Blackburn**	**83**	**2017–present**	

== AFL Women's games record holder ==
**Bold**	Current player

Updated to the end of the 2025 season.

Player	Total	Record broken/equalled	Career games	Club(s)	Career span
**Ally Anderson**	First to reach 100 games (round 7, 2025)		**108**	**Brisbane**	**2017–present**
**Ebony Marinoff**	First to reach 100 games (round 7, 2025)		**107**	**Adelaide**	**2017–present**
**Ebony Marinoff**	**107**	Finals week 2, 2025	**107**	**Adelaide**	**2017–present**
**Ally Anderson**	**107**	Finals week 3, 2025	**108**	**Brisbane**	**2017–present**

== See also ==
- AFL Women's goalkicking records
- VFL/AFL games records

== Sources ==
- Every AFLW player at AustralianFootball.com
