= 2017 AFL Women's Rising Star =

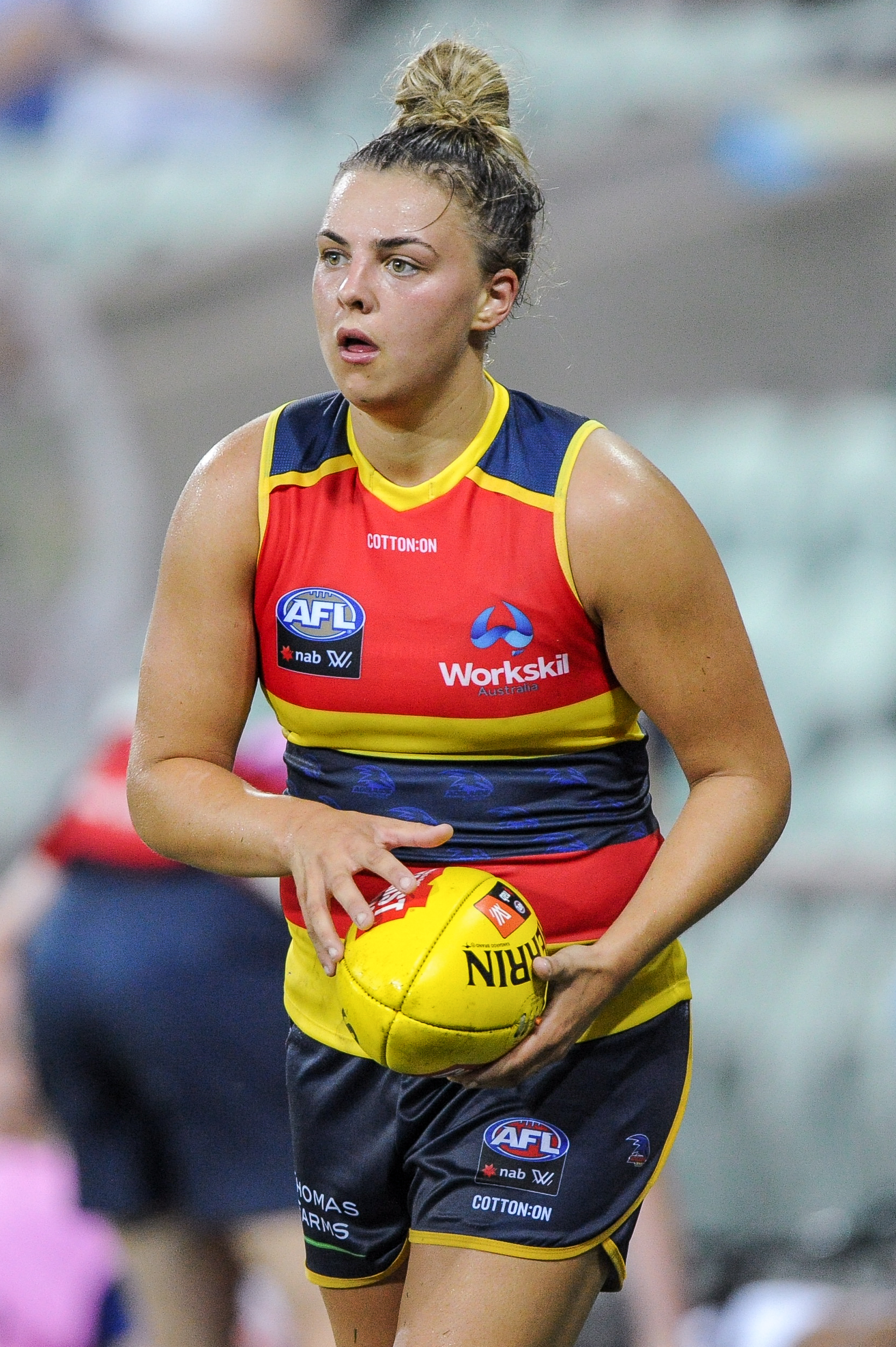
- Ebony Marinoff, 2017 winner
- Sponsored by: National Australia Bank
- Date: 28 March 2017
- Location: Peninsula, Docklands
- Reward(s): $20,000
- Winner: Ebony Marinoff (Adelaide)

The AFL Women's Rising Star is an Australian rules football award given annually to the best young player in the AFL Women's (AFLW) for the year. Two eligible players are nominated each round of the home-and-away season; the players must have been under 21 at the beginning of the year and cannot have been previously nominated. Players suspended during the year cannot win. After the season's completion, an expert panel votes on the recipient.

In 2016, National Australia Bank expanded its 14-year sponsorship of the Australian Football League (AFL) to the women's competition, including the naming rights to its Rising Star award, ahead of its first season in 2017. The inaugural Rising Star, who won $20,000, was announced at the AFLW's awards ceremony on 28 March, held at Peninsula, an event space in Docklands, Melbourne. The ceremony was live-streamed on the AFL's website and mobile app. The ten members of the year's voting panel were Mark Evans, Darren Flanigan, Ros Lanigan, Simon Lethlean, Jennie Loughnan, Peta Searle, Kevin Sheehan, Kelli Underwood, Josh Vanderloo and Shelley Ware.

Ebony Marinoff of Adelaide was the inaugural winner, earning 47 votes. A midfielder, she led the league in tackles, laying a total of 70 for the season. She played in Adelaide's premiership side and was also named on the interchange bench in the season's AFLW All-Australian team. Melbourne amassed the most nominations during the season, with four players (Deanna Berry, Jasmine Grierson, Lily Mithen and Katherine Smith) selected.

== Nominations ==
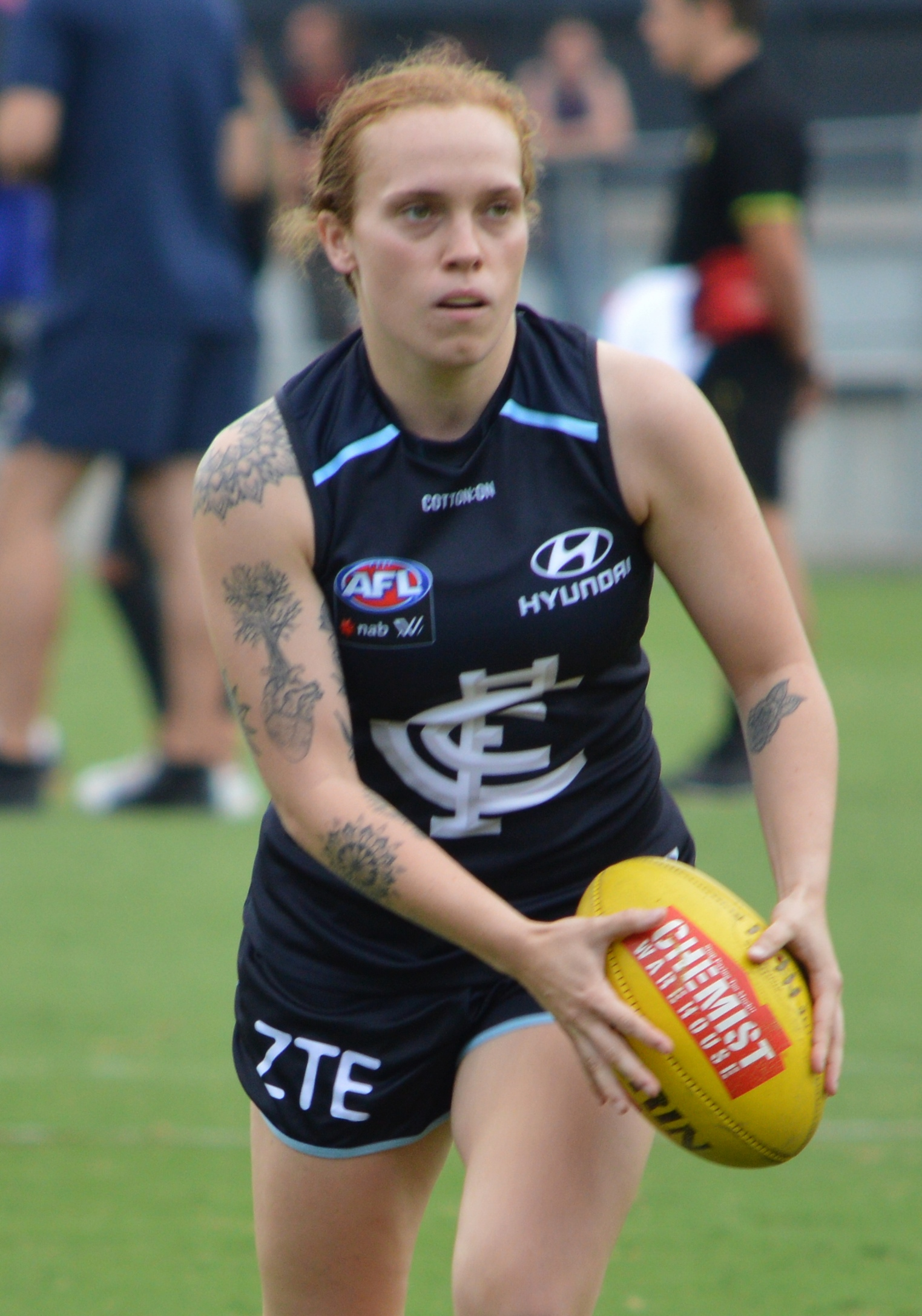
Both players nominated in round 5 played for Carlton: Tilly Lucas-Rodd (pictured) and Bella Ayre.

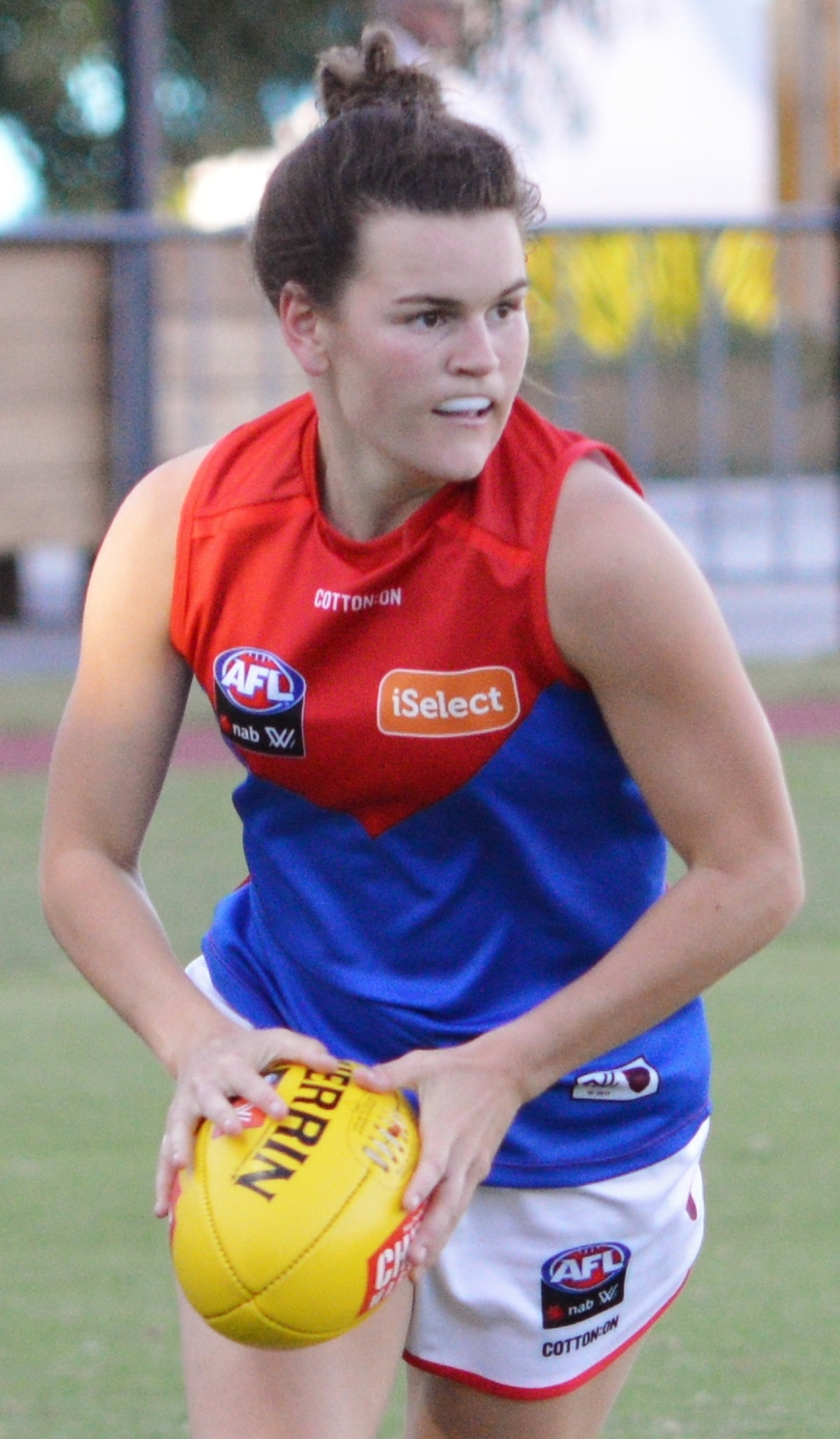
Melbourne's Lily Mithen finished third, accruing 23 votes.

Table of nominees
Round	Player	Club	Ref.
1	Bailey Hunt	Western Bulldogs	
1	Ebony Marinoff	Adelaide	
2	Tayla Harris	Brisbane	
2	Lily Mithen	Melbourne	
3	Erin McKinnon	Greater Western Sydney	
3	Ashley Sharp	Fremantle	
4	Sabrina Frederick-Traub	Brisbane	
4	Jasmine Grierson	Melbourne	
5	Bella Ayre	Carlton	
5	Tilly Lucas-Rodd	Carlton	
6	Brittany Bonnici	Collingwood	
6	Katherine Smith	Melbourne	
7	Nicola Barr	Greater Western Sydney	
7	Deanna Berry	Melbourne	

Table of nominations by club
Number	Club	Player	Nom.
4	Melbourne	Lily Mithen	2
4	Melbourne	Jasmine Grierson	4
4	Melbourne	Katherine Smith	6
4	Melbourne	Deanna Berry	7
2	Brisbane	Tayla Harris	2
2	Brisbane	Sabrina Frederick-Traub	4
2	Carlton	Bella Ayre	5
2	Carlton	Tilly Lucas-Rodd	5
2	Greater Western Sydney	Erin McKinnon	3
2	Greater Western Sydney	Nicola Barr	7
1	Adelaide	Ebony Marinoff	1
1	Collingwood	Brittany Bonnici	6
1	Fremantle	Ashley Sharp	3
1	Western Bulldogs	Bailey Hunt	1

== Final voting ==
Table of votes
Placing	Player	Club	Nom.	Votes
1	Ebony Marinoff	Adelaide	1	47
2	Sabrina Frederick-Traub	Brisbane	4	41
3	Lily Mithen	Melbourne	2	23
4	Tayla Harris	Brisbane	2	18
5	Jasmine Grierson	Melbourne	4	12
6	Erin McKinnon	Greater Western Sydney	3	5
7	Nicola Barr	Greater Western Sydney	7	2
7	Deanna Berry	Melbourne	7	2

== See also ==
- 2017 AFL Rising Star
