= Mithun =

Mithun or Mithen may refer to:

== Businesses ==
- Mithun, Inc, a architecture firm (founded 1949)
- Mithun Agency, an advertising agency (1933–2016)

== People ==
=== Surname ===
- Anthony Mithen (fl. 1990–2003), Australian sports journalist
- Laurie Mithen (1934–2022), Australian-rules footballer
- Marianne Mithun (born 1946), American linguist
- Steven Mithen (born 1960), British archaeologist

=== Given name ===
- Mithun Sharma (or Mithoon; born 1985), Indian musician
- Mohammad Mithun Ali (born 1990), Bangladeshi cricketer
- Mithun Chakraborty (born 1950), Indian actor
- Mithun Chowdhury (born 1989), Bangladeshi footballer
- Mithun Manhas (born 1979), Indian cricketer
- Mithun Tejaswi (born 1979), Indian actor

== Other uses ==
- Mithun (animal), or gayal, a bovine of South Asia
- Mithuna (month), in the Hindu calendar

== See also ==
- Mithunam (disambiguation)
- Maithuna, the Sanskrit term for sexual union
