= Deanna Berry =

Australian rules footballer

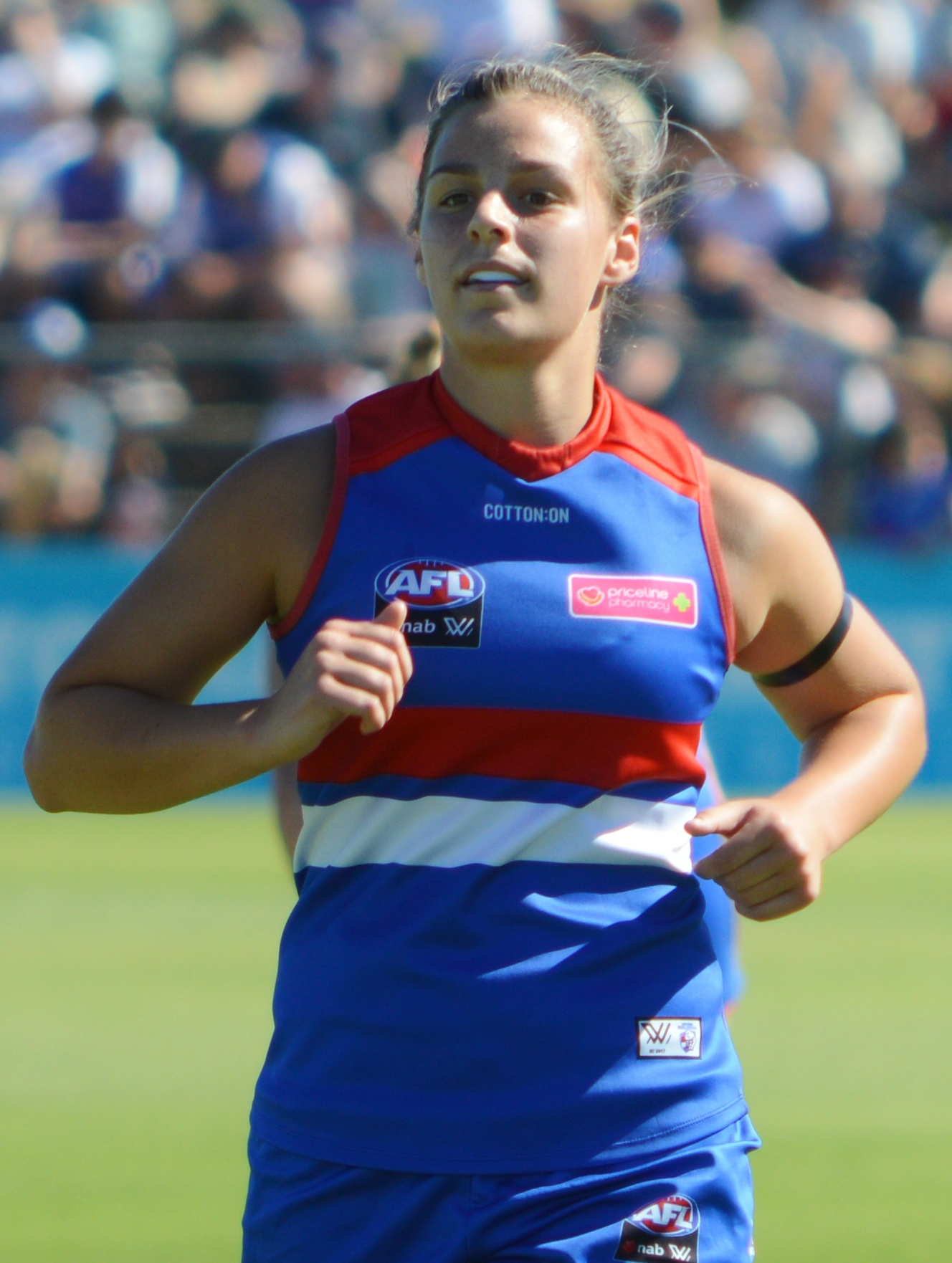
- Berry playing for the Western Bulldogs in 2018

Personal information
- Full name: Deanna Berry
- Born: 7 May 1998 (age 28)
- Original team: Melbourne University (VFLW)
- Draft: No. 9, 2016 AFL Women's draft
- Debut: Round 1, 2017, Melbourne vs. Brisbane, at Casey Fields
- Height: 171 cm (5 ft 7 in)
- Position: Midfielder / forward

Club information
- Current club: Western Bulldogs
- Number: 7

Playing career^{1}
Years	Club	Games (Goals)
2017	Melbourne	7 (5)
2018–	Western Bulldogs	51 (17)
Total		58 (22)
- ^{1} Playing statistics correct to the end of the 2024 season.

Career highlights
- AFL Women's premiership player: 2018; Western Bulldogs captain: 2024–; AFL Women's Rising Star nominee: 2017

Deanna Berry (born 7 May 1998) is an Australian rules footballer playing for the Western Bulldogs in the AFL Women's (AFLW). She previously played for the Melbourne Football Club in 2017. Berry has served as Western Bulldogs captain since the 2024 season.

== Early life ==
Berry grew up in the Whittlesea region of Melbourne, playing her junior football for the Mernda Demons, alongside the Demons, she was selected to represent Vic Metro, as well as playing for Montmoerency and Melbourne University in the Victorian Women's Football League. Her leadership saw her captain the Calder Cannons Youth Girls academy.

Her junior career saw her drafted by Melbourne with their second selection and ninth overall in the 2016 AFL Women's draft, ironically ensuring she remained a Demon.

== Career ==
Berry would make her debut in a fifteen point loss to Brisbane at Casey Fields, during the opening round of the 2017 season, the inaugural season for the AFLW. She played every match during the season and after the final round match against Fremantle—in which she recorded eleven disposals, three marks and two goals—she was nominated for the AFLW Rising Star.

After one season with Melbourne, Berry was traded to the Western Bulldogs during the 2017 trade period.

During her first year with the Dogs, she would play six games, on her way to the Grand Final against Brisbane. Going into half time 6 points down, she would kick the first goal of the second half to level the scores, before the Dogs would kick away to enter the last quarter ahead by 13. A late comeback by the Lions was too late to earn the Bulldogs their first AFLW Premiership.

During the Bulldogs 25 point win over Greater Western Sydney she would suffer a ACL injury, ruling her out of the remainder of the 2021 AFLW season. She would go on to sign a contract extension with the club on 16 June 2021, after playing 5 games for the club that season.

Prior to the 2024 AFLW season, she would replace Ellie Blackburn as club captain, before playing her 50th AFLW match in a 11 point loss to West Coast at Whitten Oval. She would claim her first win as captain in a 42 point win over Collingwood.

== Statistics ==
Statistics are correct to Round 5, 2024 season.

Legend
G	Goals	K	Kicks	D	Disposals	T	Tackles
B	Behinds	H	Handballs	M	Marks

Season	Team	No.	Games	Totals							Averages (per game)							Votes
Season	Team	No.	Games	G	B	K	H	D	M	T	G	B	K	H	D	M	T	Votes
2017	Melbourne	7	7	5	5	43	6	49	11	7	0.7	0.7	6.1	0.9	7.0	1.6	1.0	0
2018^{#}	Western Bulldogs	7	6	2	1	21	6	27	6	8	0.3	0.2	3.5	1.0	4.5	1.0	1.3	0
2019	Western Bulldogs	7	5	1	2	22	5	27	7	9	0.2	0.4	4.4	1.0	5.4	1.4	1.8	0
2020	Western Bulldogs	7	5	2	0	14	6	20	3	8	0.4	0.0	2.8	1.2	4.0	0.6	1.6	0
2021	Western Bulldogs	7	5	0	1	27	17	44	9	19	0.0	0.2	5.4	3.4	8.8	1.8	3.8	0
2022 (Season 6)	Western Bulldogs	7	3	2	1	12	4	16	5	5	0.7	0.3	4.0	1.3	5.3	1.7	1.7	0
2022 (Season 7)	Western Bulldogs	7	11	3	5	77	44	121	32	31	0.3	0.5	7.0	4.0	11.0	2.9	2.8	1
2023	Western Bulldogs	7	5	3	3	55	23	78	11	16	0.6	0.6	11.0	4.6	15.6	2.2	3.2	0
2024	Western Bulldogs	7	6	2	0	47	12	59	7	9	0.3	0	7.8	2.0	9.8	1.2	1.8	0
Career			53	20	18	318	123	441	91	112	0.4	0.3	6.0	2.3	8.3	1.7	2.1	1
