= 2022 AFL Women's season =

2022 AFL Women's season may refer to:

- 2022 AFL Women's season 6, which took place from January to April
- 2022 AFL Women's season 7, which took place from August to November
