= 2022 AFLW season =

The 2022 AFLW season may refer to either of two editions of the AFL Women's competition in Australian rules football played during the 2022 calendar year:

- 2022 AFL Women's season 6 was played between January and April
- 2022 AFL Women's season 7 was played between August and November
