= Mithunam =

Mithunam or Midhunam may refer to:

- Maithuna, sexual union in Tantrism
- Midhunam, the 11th month of the Malayalam calendar
- Mithunam (1993 film), a Malayalam film
- Mithunam (2012 film), a Telugu film

== See also ==
- Mithun (disambiguation)
