= Ruby Schleicher =

Australian rules footballer

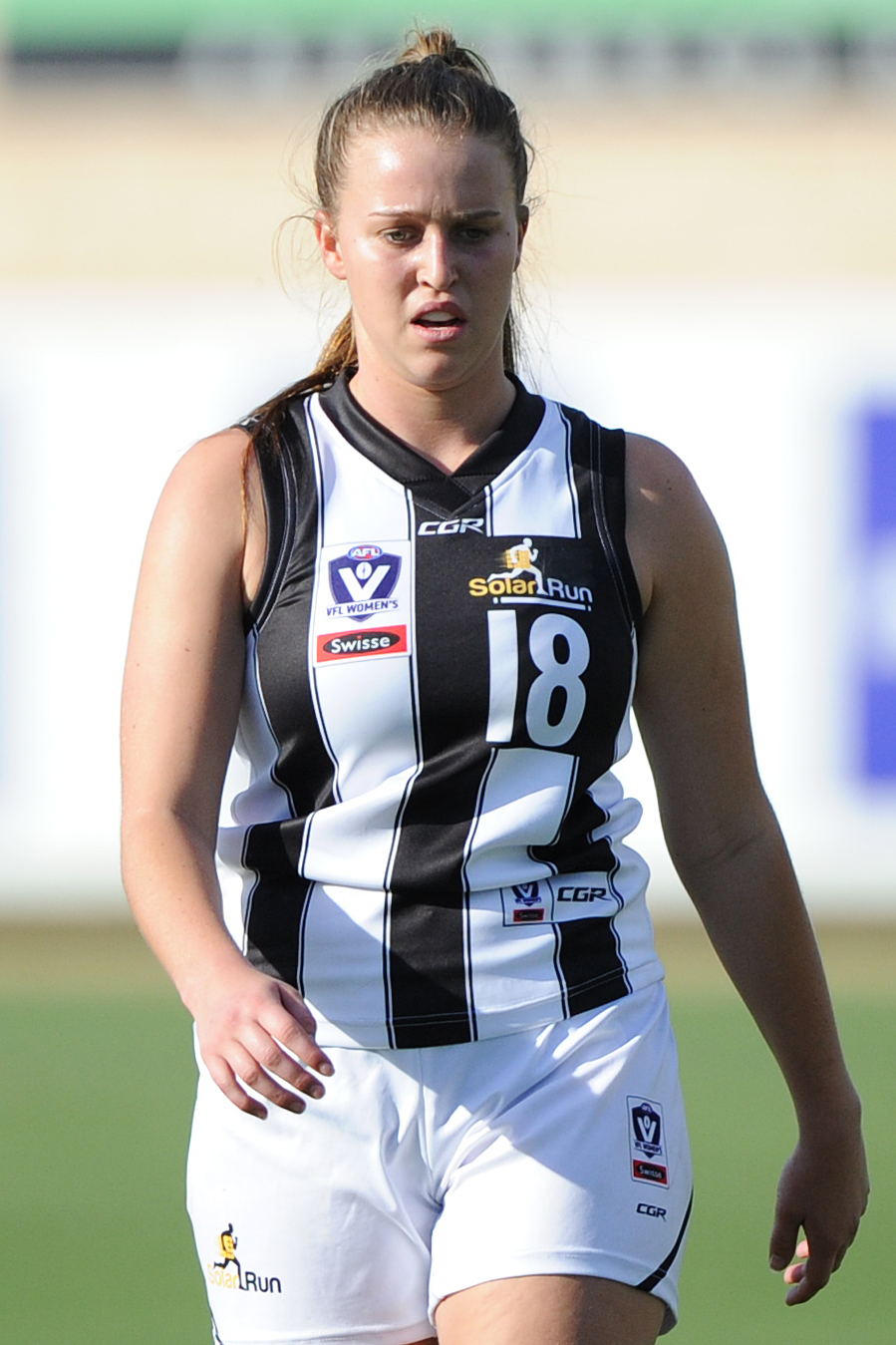
- Schleicher playing for Collingwood's VFLW team in 2018

Personal information
- Full name: Ruby Jayne Schleicher
- Born: 16 March 1998 (age 28)
- Original team: East Fremantle (WAWFL)
- Draft: No. 137, 2016 national draft
- Debut: Round 1, 2017, Collingwood vs. Carlton, at Ikon Park
- Height: 175 cm (5 ft 9 in)
- Position: Defender

Club information
- Current club: Collingwood
- Number: 18

Playing career^{1}
Years	Club	Games (Goals)
2017–	Collingwood	82 (17)
- ^{1} Playing statistics correct to the end of round 9, 2026.

Career highlights
- Collingwood captain: 2025–; 2× AFL Women's All-Australian team: 2021, S6; Collingwood best and fairest: 2024

Ruby Jayne Schleicher (/ˈslaɪʃər/ SLY-shər; born 16 March 1998) is an Australian rules footballer playing for the Collingwood Football Club in the AFL Women's (AFLW). Schleicher is a dual AFL Women's All-Australian and won the Collingwood best and fairest award in 2024. She has served as Collingwood captain since 2025.

== Early life and state football ==
As a junior basketball player with the Willetton Tigers, Schleicher won the Western Australian Basketball League (WABL) Female Player of the Year award in 2014. She also represented the under-16 and the under-18 Western Australian Metropolitan teams. She was on the way to receiving a basketball scholarship at an American college, before breaking a vertebra playing and half-a-year later breaking one on the other side while surfing, which as a result of the college decided not to risk her.

In 2015, Schleicher was named in the Western Australian squad for the AFL Youth Girls National Championships. In 2016, she played with the WA Youth Girls team who made the Grand Final, before getting the opportunity to play senior football for her local WAWFL club East Fremantle. In her last game of the year she was the starting ruck for East Fremantle in the Grand Final.

In the winter during the off-season between the 2017 and 2018 AFLW seasons, Schleicher decided to stay in Melbourne and play in the VFLW with the St Kilda Sharks. She debuted with the St Kilda Sharks in their round 1 match against Eastern Devils, winning by one point.

== AFL Women's career ==
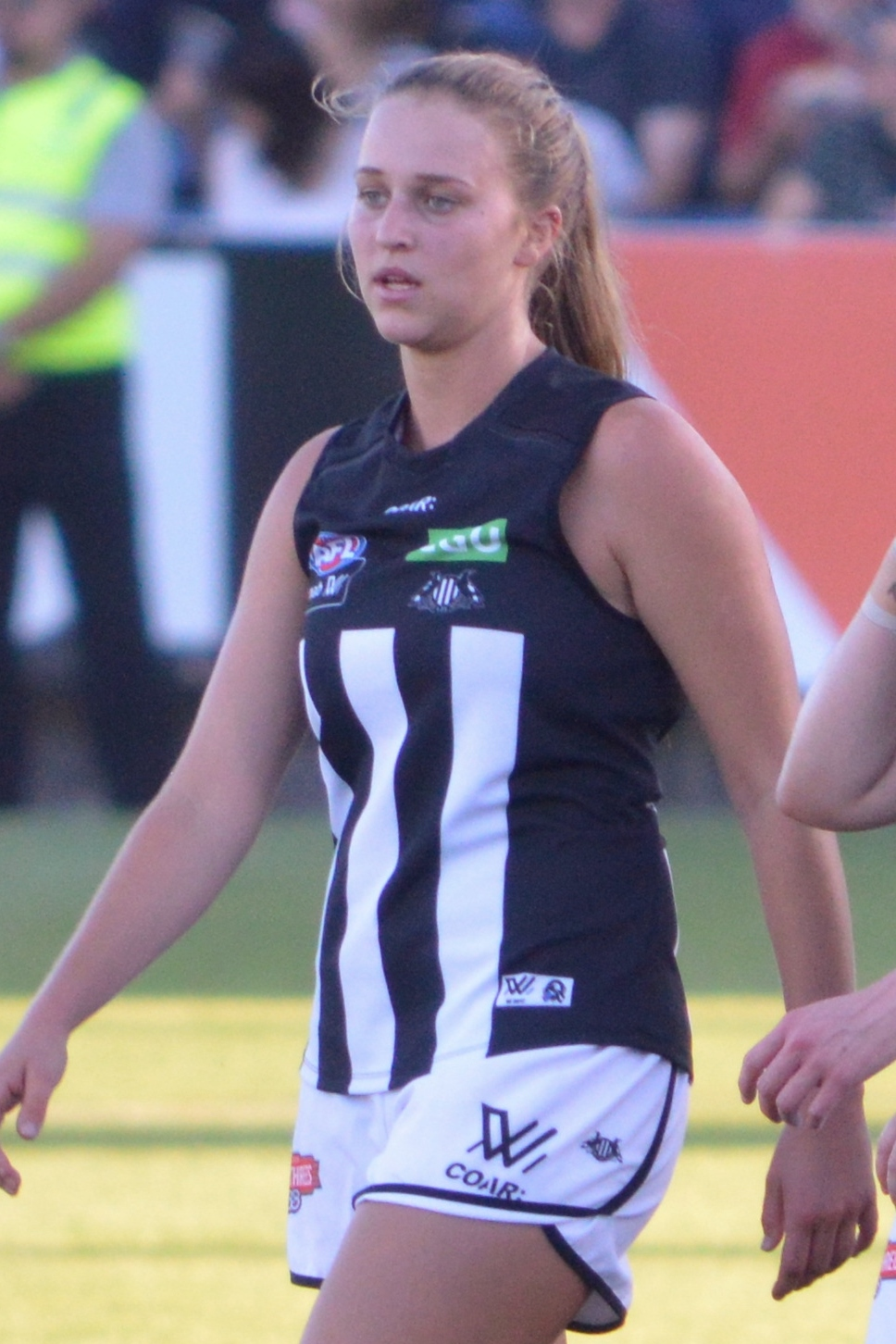
Schleicher playing for Collingwood in 2017

Schleicher was selected by Collingwood with pick 144, joining 22 other West Australians drafted in the inaugural AFL Women's draft, and was the youngest player drafted by Collingwood. She made her debut in round 1, 2017, in the inaugural AFLW match at IKON Park against Carlton.

Collingwood re-signed Schleicher for the 2018 season during the trade period in May 2017.

Collingwood re-signed Schleicher for the 2019 season during the trade period in June 2018.

In the 2021 AFL Women's season, Schleicher was awarded with her maiden All-Australian blazer, named on the half back position. It was revealed Schleicher had signed on with Collingwood for two years on 10 June 2021. Schleicher achieved selection in Champion Data's 2021 AFLW All-Star stats team, after leading the league for total intercept possessions and intercept marks in the 2021 season.

In 2024, Schleicher was named among Collingwood's best players in losses to Sydney in week 1 and West Coast in one of week 4's matches, and was Collingwood's best player in its other week 4 loss to the Western Bulldogs.

On 6 December 2024, Schleicher was awarded the best and fairest in Collingwood's AFLW team, with a total of 110 votes across the 11 games for the season, just overtaking the first-year player Lucy Cronin, with 102 votes. Schleicher averaged 26.5 disposals for the season, and totaled 60 intercept possessions and 48 tackles across the season.

In July 2025, Schleicher was named the Collingwood AFLW captain for the 2025 season, following the captaincy of Brianna Davey.

== Statistics ==
Updated to the end of the 2025 season.

Legend
G	Goals	K	Kicks	D	Disposals	T	Tackles
B	Behinds	H	Handballs	M	Marks

Season	Team	No.	Games	Totals							Averages (per game)							Votes
Season	Team	No.	Games	G	B	K	H	D	M	T	G	B	K	H	D	M	T	Votes
2017	Collingwood	18	5	0	0	9	6	15	0	15	0.0	0.0	1.8	1.2	3.0	0.0	3.0	0
2018	Collingwood	18	5	0	0	14	6	20	6	9	0.0	0.0	2.8	1.2	4.0	1.2	1.8	0
2019	Collingwood	18	6	0	0	23	13	36	9	8	0.0	0.0	3.8	2.2	6.0	1.5	1.3	0
2020	Collingwood	18	2	0	0	8	3	11	1	2	0.0	0.0	4.0	1.5	5.5	0.5	1.0	0
2021	Collingwood	18	11	2	0	115	62	177	46	29	0.2	0.0	10.5	5.6	16.1	4.2	2.6	2
2022 (S6)	Collingwood	18	11	1	0	115	83	198	54	35	0.1	0.0	10.5	7.5	18.0	4.9	3.2	6
2022 (S7)	Collingwood	18	11	0	1	116	54	170	35	48	0.0	0.1	10.5	4.9	15.5	3.2	4.4	3
2023	Collingwood	18	2	0	0	14	7	21	4	7	0.0	0.0	7.0	3.5	10.5	2.0	3.5	0
2024	Collingwood	18	11	1	2	92	90	182	19	48	0.1	0.2	8.4	8.2	16.5	1.7	4.4	1
2025	Collingwood	18	10	3	3	72	71	143	26	67	0.3	0.2	7.2	7.1	14.3	2.6	6.7	4
Career			74	7	6	578	395	973	200	268	0.1	0.1	7.8	5.3	13.1	2.7	3.6	16

== Honours and achievements ==
- Collingwood captain: 2025–present
- 2× AFL Women's All-Australian team: 2021, S6
- Collingwood best and fairest: 2024
