= Tilly Lucas-Rodd =

Australian rules footballer (born 1996)

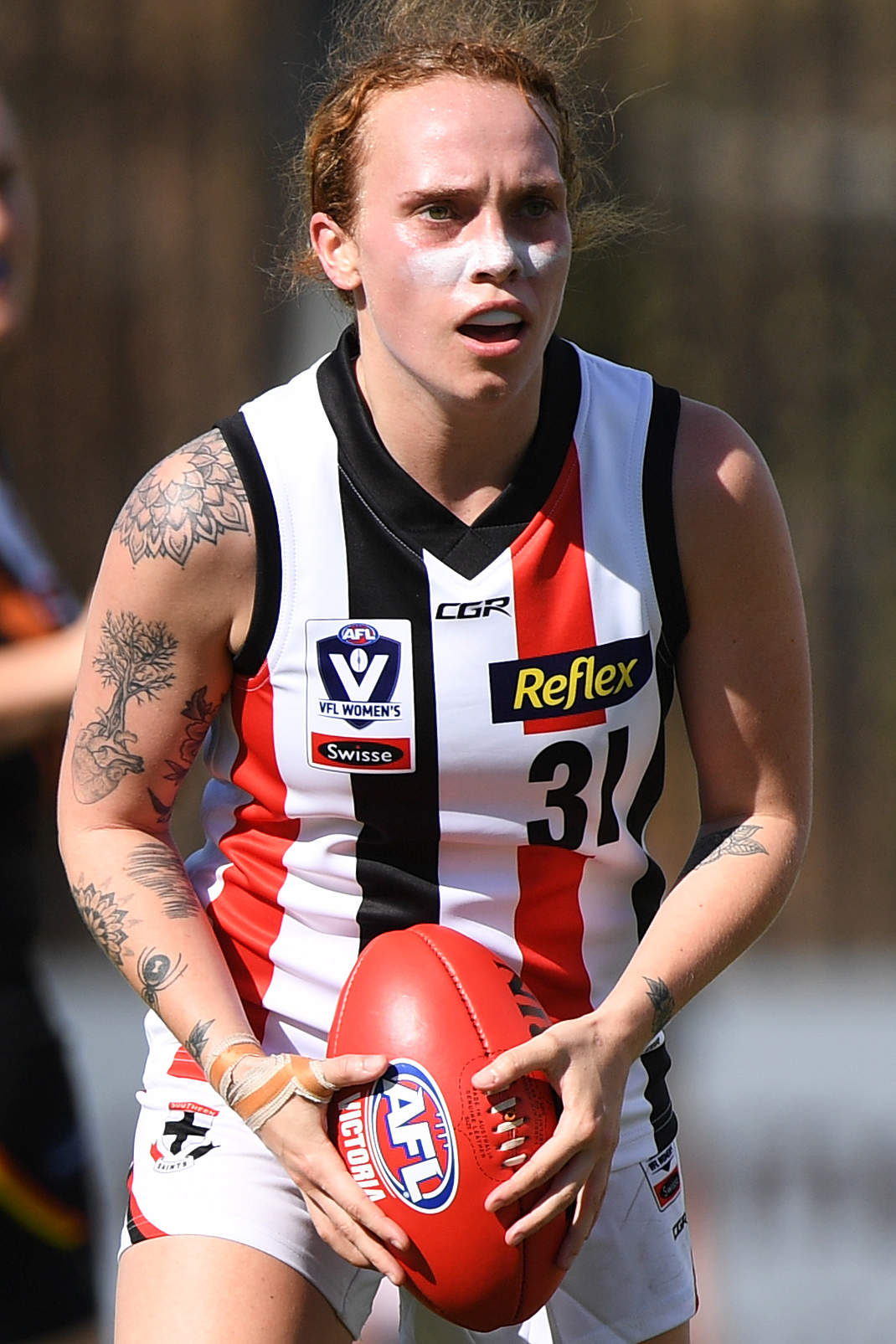
- Lucas-Rodd playing for the Southern Saints in 2019

Personal information
- Full name: Matilda Lucas-Rodd
- Born: 18 April 1996 (age 30)
- Original teams: East Malvern (YJFL)/ St Kilda Sharks (VFLW)
- Draft: No. 99, 2016 AFL Women's draft
- Debut: Round 1, 2017, Carlton vs. Collingwood, at Ikon Park
- Height: 160 cm (5 ft 3 in)
- Position: Midfielder

Club information
- Current club: Greater Western Sydney

Playing career^{1}
Years	Club	Games (Goals)
2017–2019	Carlton	18 (2)
2020–2022 (S6)	St Kilda	25 (1)
2022 (S7)–2025	Hawthorn	47 (4)
2026–	Greater Western Sydney	0 (0)
Total		90 (7)
- ^{1} Playing statistics correct to the end of 2025.

Career highlights
- AFL Women's All-Australian Team: 2024; Hawthorn captain: S7–2023; Hawthorn best and fairest: S7; Hawthorn games record holder

Matilda Lucas-Rodd (born 18 April 1996) is an Australian rules footballer playing for the Greater Western Sydney Giants in the AFL Women's (AFLW). They previously played for the Carlton Football Club from 2017 to 2019 and the St Kilda Football Club from 2020 to 2022 (S6). They were the inaugural Hawthorn best and fairest winner, and they served as Hawthorn captain from 2022 season 7 to 2023.

== Career ==
=== Early career ===
Lucas-Rodd played for East Malvern in the inaugural Yarra Junior Football League (YJFL) Youth Girls season in 2011, finishing third in the best-and-fairest at the end of the year.

=== AFLW ===
==== Carlton (2017–2019) ====
Lucas-Rodd was drafted by Carlton with the 99th overall selection in the 2016 AFL Women's draft, making their debut in Round 1, 2017, in the league's inaugural match at Ikon Park against Collingwood. In round 5 they earned a nomination for the 2017 AFLW Rising Star award following their match against Fremantle. Lucas-Rodd finished 2017 having played in all seven of Carlton's matches that season. In April 2019, Lucas-Rodd was delisted by Carlton.

==== St Kilda (2020–2022 (S6)) ====
Lucas-Rodd was recruited by St Kilda as a delisted free agent and helped lead the Southern Saints' maiden season in the VFLW, finishing second on the ladder and making the preliminary final before succumbing to eventual premiers Collingwood. Their season was capped off by winning the club's best and fairest award, as well as receiving a place in the VFLW Team of the Year. It was revealed Lucas-Rodd had signed on with the Saints for two more years on 30 June 2021, tying them to the club until the end of 2022 season 7.

==== Hawthorn (2022 S7–2025) ====
Tilly became an inaugural Hawthorn player, They were a standout across the backline for the Hawks winning the Hawthorn Best and Fairest Medal and in 2024 they became Captain and got selected in the All Australian Squad, playing their 75th game in the teams first final in 2024. At the end of 2025 season Lucas-Rodd requested a trade to the GWS Giants ending their era at the Hawks.

==== GWS Giants (2026–) ====
Lucas-Rodd got traded to the Giants on Trade deadline day, and on May 13th got added to the Giants Leadership group.

== Personal life ==
On 10 May 2023, Lucas-Rodd came out as non-binary and stated that they use they/them pronouns. Over the 2025 AFLW off-season, they underwent gender affirming top surgery. In 2025, they began dating Kath Ebbs, who is an ex-partner of American singer and internet personality JoJo Siwa.

== Statistics ==
Updated to the end of 2025.

Legend
G	Goals	K	Kicks	D	Disposals	T	Tackles
B	Behinds	H	Handballs	M	Marks

Season	Team	No.	Games	Totals							Averages (per game)							Votes
Season	Team	No.	Games	G	B	K	H	D	M	T	G	B	K	H	D	M	T	Votes
2017	Carlton	18	7	0	1	49	24	73	10	18	0.0	0.1	7.0	3.4	10.4	1.4	2.6	0
2018	Carlton	18	6	0	1	34	16	50	9	21	0.0	0.2	5.7	2.7	8.3	1.5	3.5	0
2019	Carlton	18	5	2	1	20	13	33	4	16	0.4	0.2	4.0	2.6	6.6	0.8	3.2	0
2020	St Kilda	18	6	0	0	55	24	79	14	14	0.0	0.0	9.2	4.0	13.2	2.3	2.3	1
2021	St Kilda	18	9	0	0	99	34	133	21	26	0.0	0.0	11.0	3.8	14.8	2.3	2.9	1
2022 (S6)	St Kilda	18	10	1	2	134	67	201	19	70	0.1	0.2	13.4	6.7	20.1	1.9	7.0	11
2022 (S7)	Hawthorn	18	10	3	1	118	58	176	15	84	0.3	0.1	11.8	5.8	17.6	1.5	8.4	6
2023	Hawthorn	18	10	1	4	124	69	193	24	66	0.1	0.4	12.4	6.9	19.3	2.4	6.6	4
2024	Hawthorn	18	13	0	1	185	79	264	48	36	0.0	0.1	14.2	6.1	20.3	3.7	2.8	3
2025	Hawthorn	18	14	0	2	215	84	299	50	54	0.0	0.1	15.4	6.0	21.4	3.6	3.9	3
2026	Greater Western Sydney	22	0	0	0	0	0	0	0	0	0.0	0.0	0.0	0.0	0.0	0.0	0.0	0
Career			90	7	13	1033	468	1501	214	405	0.1	0.1	11.5	5.2	16.7	2.4	4.5	26

== Honours and achievements ==
Team

- McClelland Trophy (Hawthorn): 2024

Individual

- Hawthorn captain: S7–2023
- Hawthorn best and fairest: S7
- Hawthorn games record holder
- AFL Women's Rising Star nominee: 2017
