= Collingwood best and fairest (AFL Women's) =

- Awarded for: The best and fairest player of the Collingwood Football Club in the AFL Women's
- Country: Australia
- Presented by: Collingwood Football Club
- First award: 2017
- Currently held by: Brittany Bonnici

In the AFL Women's (AFLW), the Collingwood best and fairest award is awarded to the best and fairest player at the Collingwood Football Club during the home-and-away season. The award has been awarded annually since the competition's inaugural season in 2017, and Nicola Stevens was the inaugural winner of the award.

== Recipients ==
**Bold**	Denotes current Collingwood player
	Player won AFL Women's best and fairest in same season

Season	Recipient(s)	Ref.
2017	Nicola Stevens	
2018	Chloe Molloy	
2019	Jaimee Lambert	
2020	Jaimee Lambert (2)	
2021	**Brianna Davey**	
2022 (S6)	Jaimee Lambert (3)	
2022 (S7)	**Jordyn Allen**	
2023	**Brittany Bonnici**	
2024	**Ruby Schleicher**	
2025	**Brittany Bonnici** (2)	

== See also ==
- Copeland Trophy (list of Collingwood Football Club best and fairest winners in the Australian Football League)
