= Nicola Stevens =

Australian rules footballer

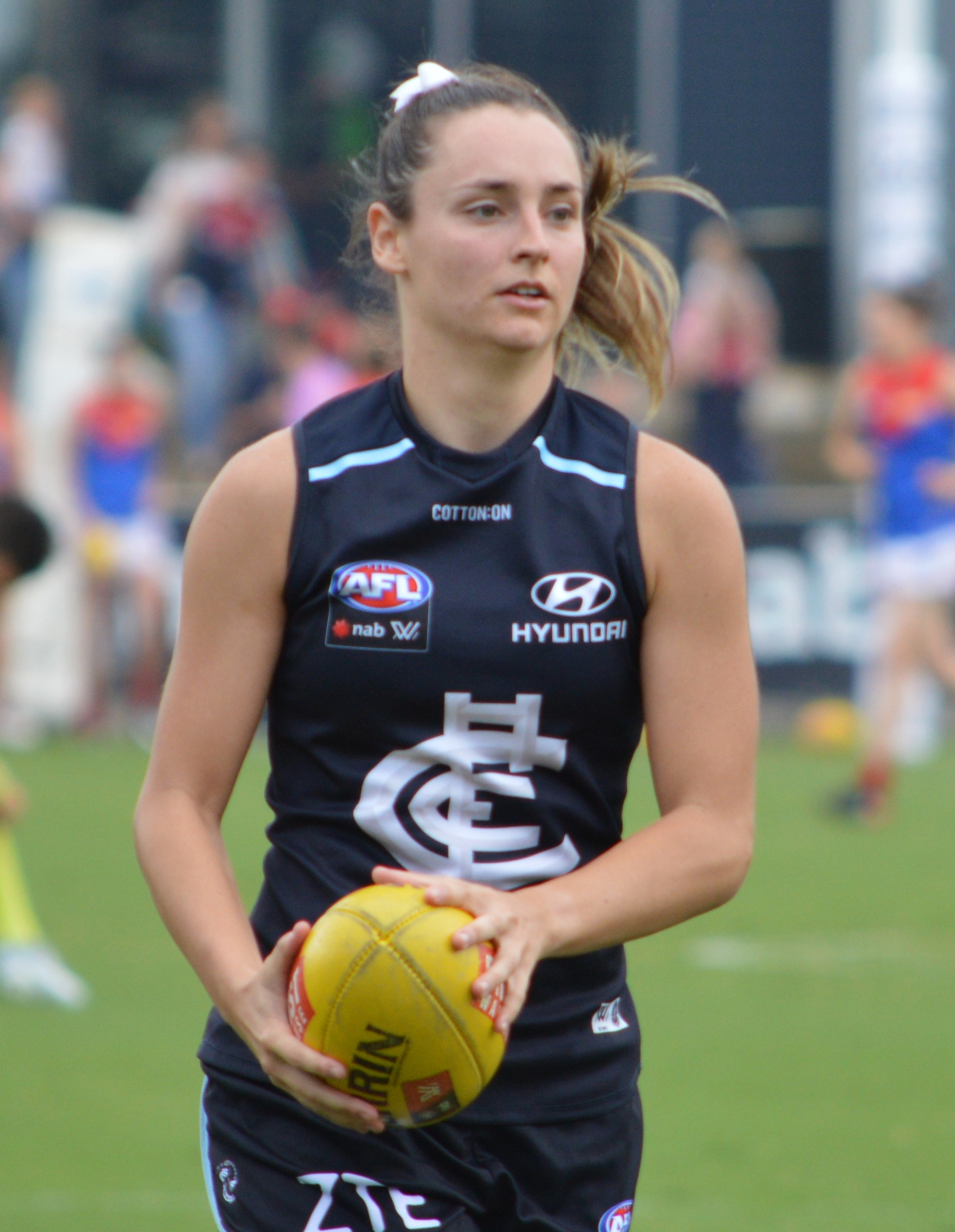
- Stevens playing for Carlton in 2018

Personal information
- Full name: Nicola Stevens
- Born: 24 March 1993 (age 33); Brunswick, Victoria
- Original team: Melbourne University (VFLW)
- Draft: No. 6, 2016 national draft
- Debut: Round 1, 2017, Collingwood vs. Carlton, at Ikon Park
- Height: 174 cm (5 ft 9 in)
- Position: Defender

Club information
- Current club: St Kilda
- Number: 2

Playing career^{1}
| Years | Club | Games (Goals) |
| 2017 | Collingwood | 7 (0) |
| 2018–2022 (S6) | Carlton | 42 (20) |
| 2022 (S7)–2025 | St Kilda | 20 (4) |
| 2026– | Geelong | 0 (0) |
| Total | | 69 (24) |

Representative team honours^{2}
| Years | Team | Games (Goals) |
| 2017 | Victoria | 1 (0) |
- ^{1} Playing statistics correct to the end of the 2023 season.^{2} Representative statistics correct as of 2017.

Career highlights
- AFL Women's All-Australian team: 2017; Collingwood best and fairest: 2017

Nicola Stevens (born 24 March 1993) is an Australian rules footballer playing for St Kilda in the AFL Women's (AFLW). She previously played for Collingwood in 2017 and for Carlton from 2018–2022 (S6). Stevens was selected in the inaugural AFL Women's All-Australian team and was the inaugural Collingwood best and fairest winner during her only season with the Magpies in 2017.

== Early life ==
Stevens grew up supporting the Essendon Football Club, having had two family members (both life members) involved at the club at different capacities. Stevens started playing Auskick and played local football throughout her childhood. In 2013, Stevens began playing for Melbourne University in the Victorian Women's Football League (VWFL), now the VFL Women's (VFLW).

Stevens was selected eighteenth overall by Western Bulldogs in the inaugural women's draft in 2013. She continued to play for the Bulldogs in AFL exhibition games in three of the next four seasons, missing the 2014 season with a knee injury.

== AFL Women's career ==
=== Collingwood (2017) ===
Stevens was drafted by Collingwood with their first selection, sixth overall, in the 2016 AFL Women's draft. Inaugural Magpies coach Wayne Siekman considered Stevens to be "the best defender in the draft". She made her debut in the inaugural AFL Women's match against Carlton at Ikon Park. Stevens was selected in the inaugural AFL Women's All-Australian team and was announced as Collingwood's inaugural best-and-fairest winner after a consistent first season. On 2 September, Stevens played for Victoria in the inaugural AFL Women's State of Origin match.

=== Carlton (2018–2022 (S6)) ===
In May 2017, Stevens was traded to Carlton, along with Collingwood's fourth-round draft selection, in exchange for Carlton's first, second and third draft selections in the 2017 AFL Women's draft. Stevens had a quiet first season at Carlton, but kicked her first career goal in round 2 against Greater Western Sydney at Drummoyne Oval. She also played for Carlton's VFL Women's team in its inaugural season in the competition. Stevens re-signed with Carlton during the trade and signing period in May 2018. She signed a 2-year contract with Carlton on 10 June 2021, after it was revealed the team had conducted a mass re-signing of 13 players.

=== St Kilda (2022 (S7)–2025) ===
In May 2022, Stevens was traded to St Kilda for a first round compensation pick, marking the first trade of the window.

=== Geelong (2026-present) ===
In December 2025, Stevens was traded to Geelong with a future third round pick for a future second round pick.

== Statistics ==
Statistics are correct to the end of round 1, 2019.

Legend
| G | Goals | K | Kicks | D | Disposals | T | Tackles |
| B | Behinds | H | Handballs | M | Marks |

| Season | Team | No. | Games | Totals | | | | | | | Averages (per game) | | | | | | | Votes |
| Season | Team | No. | Games | G | B | K | H | D | M | T | G | B | K | H | D | M | T | Votes |
|---|---|---|---|---|---|---|---|---|---|---|---|---|---|---|---|---|---|---|
| 2017 | Collingwood | 21 | 7 | 0 | 0 | 50 | 17 | 67 | 23 | 22 | 0.0 | 0.0 | 7.1 | 2.4 | 9.6 | 3.3 | 3.1 | 2 |
| 2018 | Carlton | 21 | 7 | 1 | 1 | 41 | 16 | 57 | 11 | 23 | 0.2 | 0.2 | 5.9 | 2.3 | 8.1 | 1.6 | 3.3 | 0 |
| 2019 | Carlton | 21 | 1 | 0 | 0 | 7 | 2 | 9 | 1 | 2 | 0.0 | 0.0 | 7.0 | 2.0 | 9.0 | 1.0 | 2.0 | |
| Career | | | 15 | 1 | 1 | 98 | 35 | 133 | 35 | 47 | 0.1 | 0.1 | 6.5 | 2.3 | 8.9 | 2.3 | 3.1 | 2 |

== Honours and achievements ==
Individual

- AFL Women's All-Australian team: 2017
- Collingwood best and fairest: 2017
- Victoria representative honours in AFL Women's State of Origin: 2017
