= Bailey Hunt =

Australian rules footballer

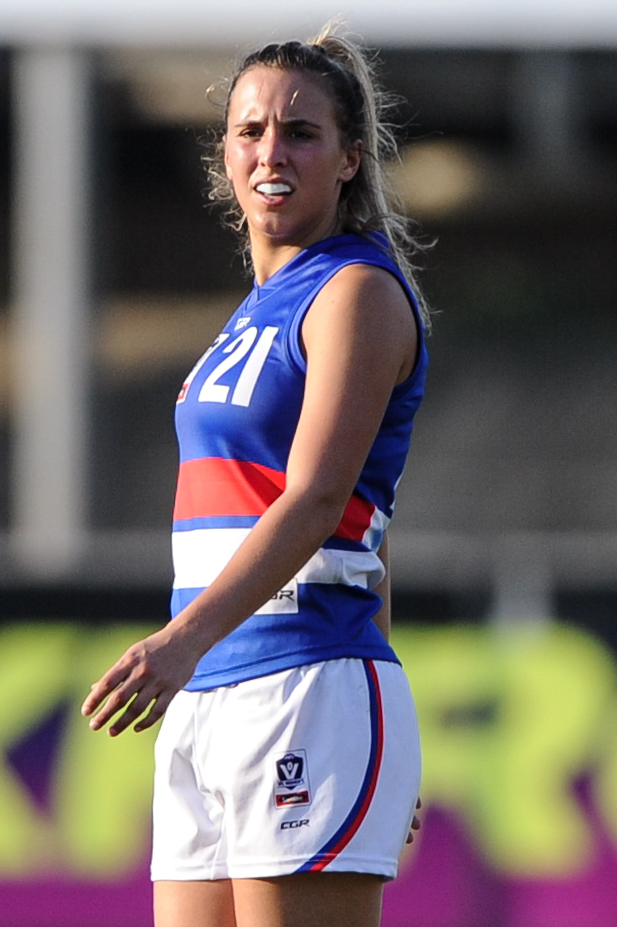
- Hunt in June 2018

Personal information
- Born: 20 September 1996 (age 30)
- Original team: Melbourne University (VFL Women's)
- Draft: No. 60, 2016 AFL Women's draft
- Debut: Round 1, 2017, Western Bulldogs vs. Fremantle, at VU Whitten Oval
- Height: 171 cm (5 ft 7 in)
- Position: Defender

Club information
- Current club: Western Bulldogs
- Number: 21

Playing career^{1}
Years	Club	Games (Goals)
2017–	Western Bulldogs	44 (1)
- ^{1} Playing statistics correct to the end of the S7 (2022) season.

Bailey Hunt (born 20 September 1996) is an Australian rules footballer playing for the Western Bulldogs in the AFL Women's competition. Hunt was drafted by the Western Bulldogs with their eighth selection and sixtieth overall in the 2016 AFL Women's draft. She made her debut in the thirty-two point win against Fremantle at VU Whitten Oval in the opening round of the 2017 season. She received an AFL Women's Rising Star nomination for her debut match, in which she recorded nine disposals and three tackles. She played every match in her debut season to finish with seven games. It was revealed that Hunt had signed a contract extension with the club on 16 June 2021, after playing 4 games for the club that season.

== Statistics ==
Statistics are correct to the end of the 2021 season.

Legend
G	Goals	K	Kicks	D	Disposals	T	Tackles
B	Behinds	H	Handballs	M	Marks

Season	Team	No.	Games	Totals							Averages (per game)							Votes
Season	Team	No.	Games	G	B	K	H	D	M	T	G	B	K	H	D	M	T	Votes
2017	Western Bulldogs	21	7	0	0	14	23	37	4	16	0.0	0.0	2.0	3.3	5.3	0.6	2.3	0
2018^{#}	Western Bulldogs	21	6	0	0	19	8	27	6	6	0.0	0.0	3.2	1.3	4.5	1.0	1.0	0
2019	Western Bulldogs	21	3	0	0	5	4	9	4	5	0.0	0.0	1.7	1.3	3.0	1.3	1.7	0
2020	Western Bulldogs	21	6	1	0	45	18	63	16	14	0.2	0.0	7.5	3.0	10.5	2.7	2.3	0
2021	Western Bulldogs	21	4	0	0	23	4	27	9	10	0.0	0.0	5.8	1.0	6.8	2.3	2.5	0
Career			26	1	0	106	57	163	39	51	0.1	0.0	4.1	2.2	6.3	1.5	2.0	0
