= Bella Ayre =

Australian rules footballer

Personal information
- Full name: Isabella Ayre
- Nickname: Bella
- Born: 9 December 1998 (age 27)
- Original team: Bendigo (VWFL)
- Draft: No. 51, 2016 AFL Women's draft
- Debut: Round 1, 2017, Carlton vs. Collingwood, at Princes Park
- Height: 176 cm (5 ft 9 in)
- Position: Forward

Playing career^{1}
Years	Club	Games (Goals)
2017	Carlton	6 (4)
2018–2019	Brisbane	6 (0)
2022 (S7)	Essendon	0 (0)
Total		12 (4)
- ^{1} Playing statistics correct to the end of 2022 season 7.

Isabella Ayre (born 9 December 1998) is an Australian rules footballer who played for Carlton, Brisbane, and Essendon in the AFL Women's (AFLW) competition.

Ayre played state league football with Bendigo prior to the creation of the AFL Women's competition.

Ayre was recruited by Carlton with the number 51 pick in the 2016 AFL Women's draft. She made her debut in the Blues' inaugural game against Collingwood at Princes Park on 3 February 2017.

On 25 May 2017, Ayre was, along with Nat Exon, traded to Brisbane in a complex trade involving four teams, five players and a draft pick.

She made her Lions debut in round 3 the following year, in a 22-point victory over her old side Carlton at Ikon Park. Ayre was unable to play a single game in 2019 due to injury, and announced her retirement on the eve of the Grand Final to pursue a career as a police officer.

In June 2022, after three years, Ayre returned to the game at AFLW level, joining expansion club Essendon after playing for their VFLW side. She suffered from injuries during the season and did not make a senior appearance, and was delisted at the end of the season.
