= Lily Mithen =

Australian rules footballer

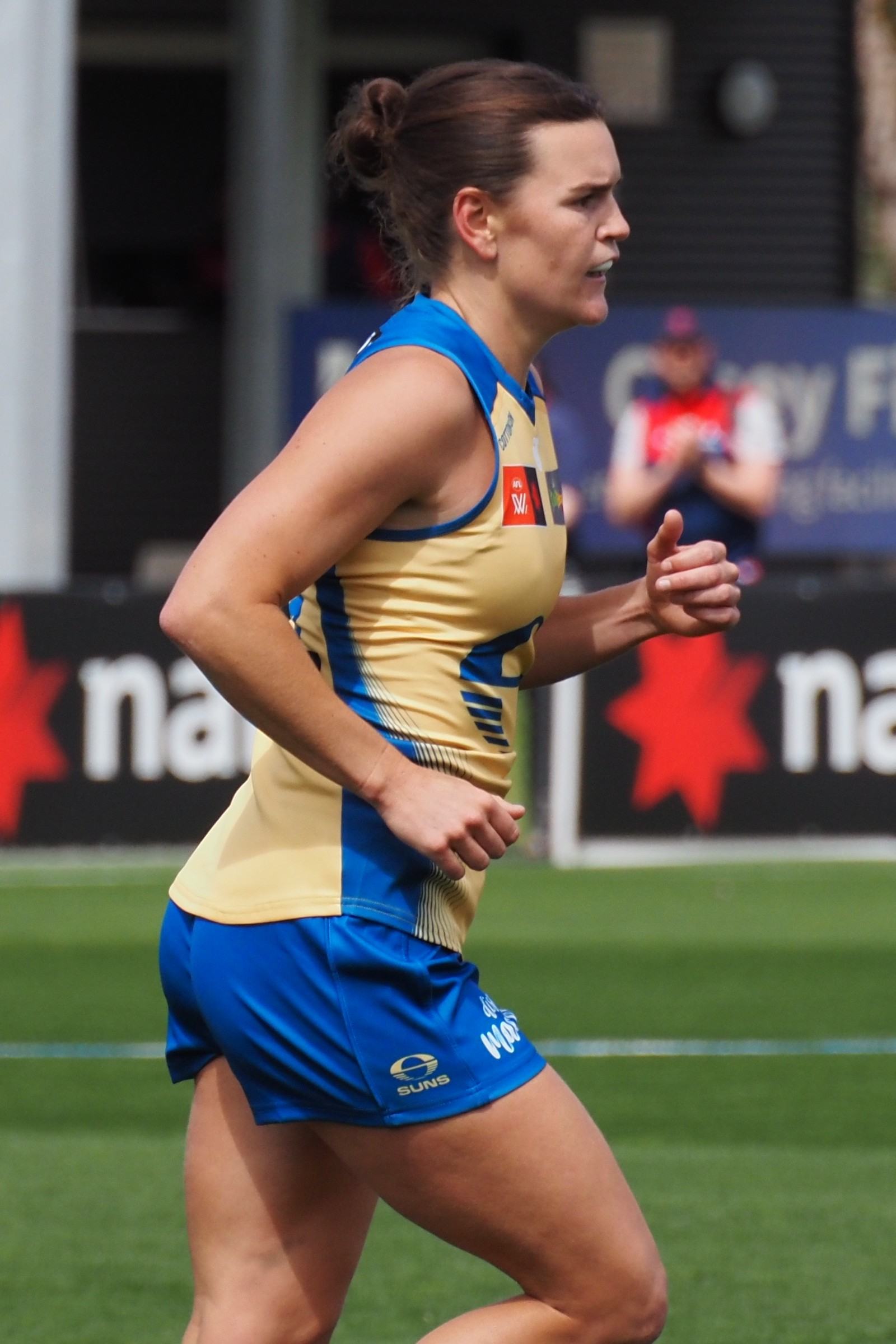
- Mithen playing for Gold Coast in 2025

Personal information
- Full name: Lily Mithen
- Born: 2 March 1998 (age 28)
- Original team: North Geelong Football Club (GDFL)
- Draft: No. 73, 2016 national draft
- Debut: Round 1, 2017, Melbourne vs. Brisbane, at Casey Fields
- Height: 159 cm (5 ft 3 in)
- Position: Midfielder

Club information
- Current club: Gold Coast
- Number: 14

Playing career^{1}
Years	Club	Games (Goals)
2017–2024	Melbourne	82 (8)
2025–	Gold Coast	12 (0)
Total		94 (8)

Representative team honours
Years	Team	Games (Goals)
2017	Victoria	1 (0)
- ^{1} Playing statistics correct to the end of the 2025 season.

Career highlights
- AFL Women's premiership player: S7; AFL Women's Rising Star nominee: 2017

Lily Mithen (born 2 March 1998) is an Australian rules footballer playing for the Gold Coast Suns in the AFL Women's (AFLW). She previously played for the Melbourne Football Club from 2017 to 2024. Mithen was nominated for the AFL Women's Rising Star award in round 2 of the 2017 season and won an AFL Women's premiership with Melbourne in season 7.

== Early life ==
Mithen's grandfather's cousin is Laurie Mithen – a Melbourne great, who played in five premierships and was named in the club's team of the century. Her father is former Nine Network journalist Anthony Mithen.

Mithen played for Newtown & Chilwell in the AFL Barwon Female Football league in her youth, tying for the league best and fairest in 2014 and winning premierships in 2014 and 2015.

== AFL Women's career ==
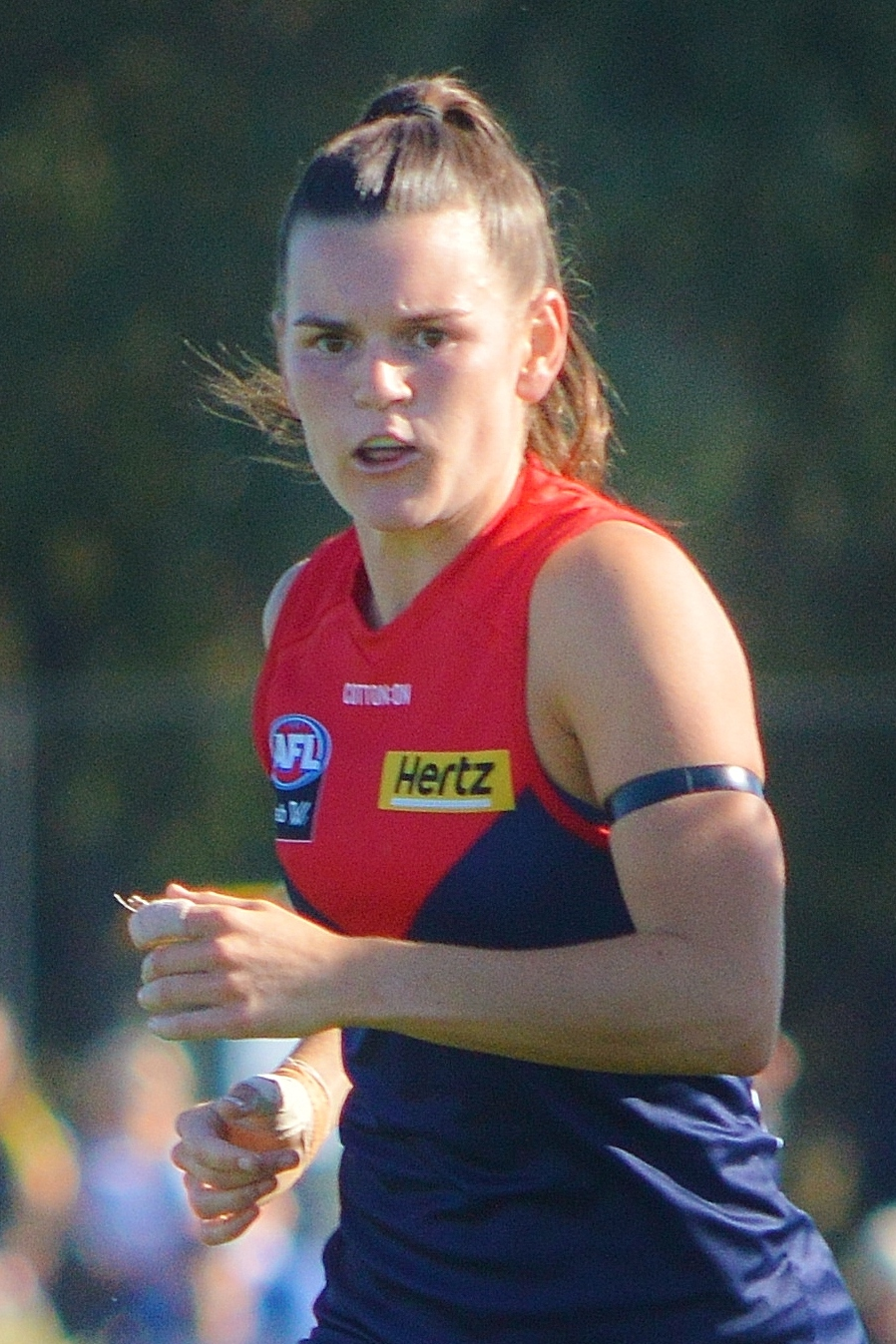
Mithen playing for Melbourne in 2021

Mithen was drafted by Melbourne with their tenth selection and seventy-third overall in the 2016 AFL Women's draft. She made her debut in the fifteen point loss to Brisbane at Casey Fields in the opening round of the 2017 season. After the nineteen point win against Collingwood at Ikon Park in round two—in which she recorded fourteen disposals, three marks and two tackles—she was the round nominee for the AFLW Rising Star. She played every match in her debut season to finish with seven games. She also won Geelong's 2017 best and fairest award in the club's VFL Women's team.

Melbourne signed Mithen for the 2018 season during the trade period in May 2017.

== Statistics ==
Updated to the end of the 2025 season.

Legend
G	Goals	K	Kicks	D	Disposals	T	Tackles
B	Behinds	H	Handballs	M	Marks
#	Played in that season's premiership team

Season	Team	No.	Games	Totals							Averages (per game)							Votes
Season	Team	No.	Games	G	B	K	H	D	M	T	G	B	K	H	D	M	T	Votes
2017	Melbourne	14	7	0	2	67	46	113	14	19	0.0	0.3	9.6	6.6	16.1	2.0	2.7	0
2018	Melbourne	14	7	0	0	41	49	90	12	15	0.0	0.0	5.9	7.0	12.9	1.7	2.1	0
2019	Melbourne	14	7	0	0	67	37	104	22	29	0.0	0.0	9.6	5.3	14.9	3.1	4.1	2
2020	Melbourne	14	3	2	0	26	10	36	11	4	0.7	0.0	8.7	3.3	12.0	3.7	1.3	0
2021	Melbourne	14	11	1	1	138	54	192	30	40	0.1	0.1	12.5	4.9	17.5	2.7	3.6	5
2022 (S6)	Melbourne	14	11	0	1	129	72	201	41	56	0.0	0.1	11.7	6.5	18.3	3.7	5.1	6
2022 (S7)^{#}	Melbourne	14	13	1	0	118	102	220	31	43	0.1	0.0	9.1	7.8	16.9	2.4	3.3	1
2023	Melbourne	14	12	4	2	101	96	197	27	48	0.3	0.2	8.4	8.0	16.4	2.3	4.0	0
2024	Melbourne	14	11	0	1	72	60	132	23	53	0.0	0.1	6.5	5.5	12.0	2.1	4.8	0
2025	Gold Coast	14	12	0	0	109	70	179	35	53	0.0	0.0	9.1	5.8	14.9	2.9	4.4	0
Career			94	8	7	868	596	1464	246	360	0.1	0.1	9.2	6.3	15.6	2.6	3.8	14

== Honours and achievements ==
Team

- AFL Women's premiership player (Melbourne): S7
- McClelland Trophy (Melbourne): 2023

Individual

- Victoria representative honours in AFL Women's State of Origin: 2017
- AFL Women's Rising Star nominee: 2017
