= Anthony Mithen =

Australian sports journalist and horse breeder

Anthony Mithen is a Melbourne-based sports commentator, radio presenter, racehorse owner and breeder.

He began his sports journalism career as a cadet at the Geelong Advertiser in 1990, before moving onto The Age newspaper in 1994. In 1997, he joined Network Ten's news/sports department as a sports reporter and he moved onto National Nine News in 1999 where he gained an excellent reputation as a sports news reporter and presenter with his specialist sports being AFL football along with horse racing.

During his career, he has won several media awards for his work on cricket from the Victorian Cricket Association and horse racing from the Victorian Amateur Turf Club.

He hosted the Prime Time Sports program from 5.30–9 am weekdays on Sport 927 with former AFL footballer Michael Christian and also called AFL football for Geelong radio station K-Rock (3GL).

He was on the board of AFL club Richmond, between 2004 and 2009.

In 2003 he stopped working for Channel 9 to concentrate on running the Rosemont Stud horse racing and breeding operations, including a part ownership of 2009 Melbourne Cup entrant Changingoftheguard.

Mithen is the father of Melbourne 2022 premiership player Lily Mithen.
