= Brittany Bonnici =

Australian rules footballer (born 1997)

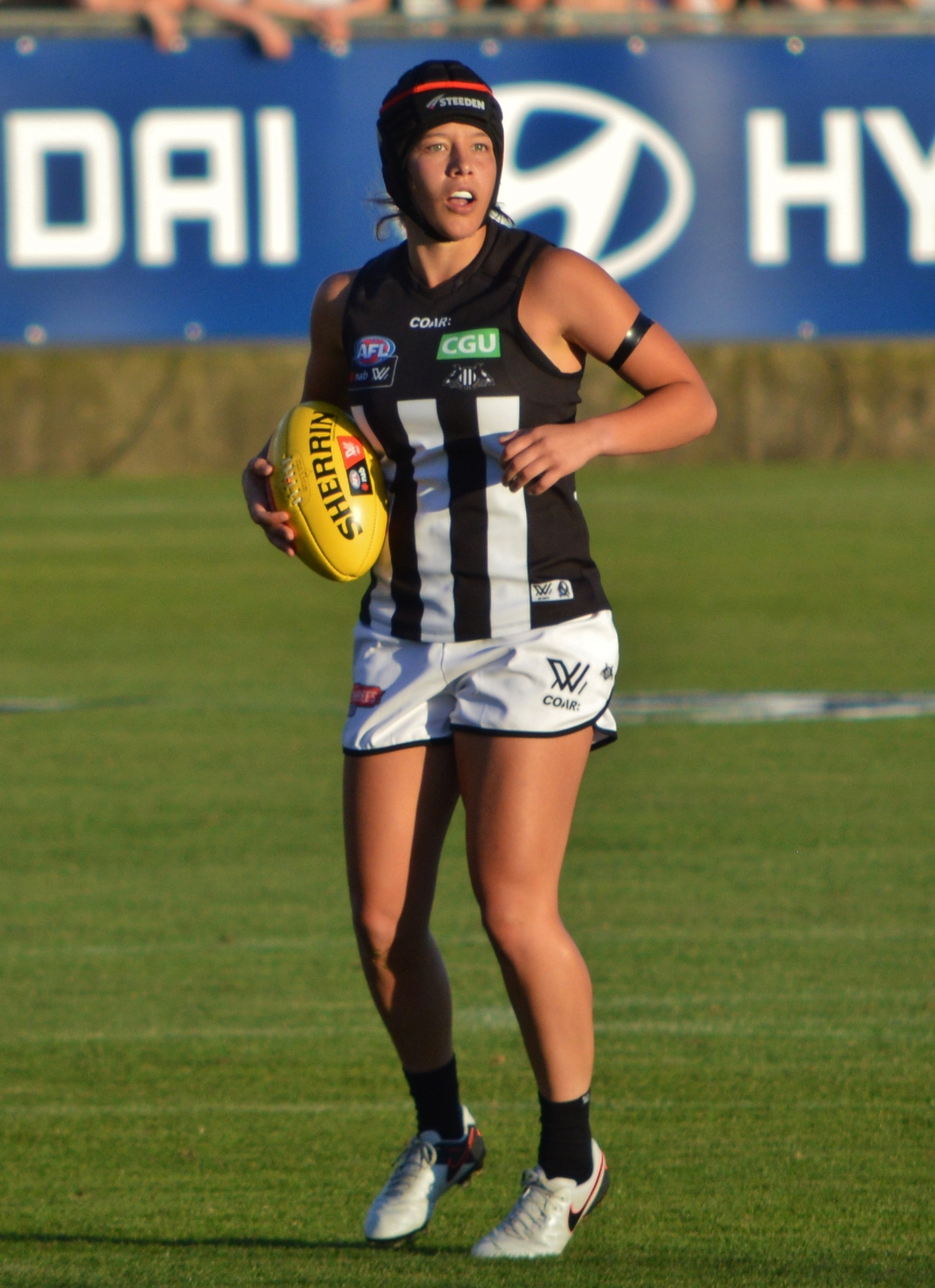
- Bonnici playing for Collingwood in February 2017

Personal information
- Full name: Brittany Bonnici
- Born: 3 August 1997 (age 29)
- Original team: St Kilda Sharks (VFLW)
- Draft: No. 27, 2016 national draft
- Debut: Round 1, 2017, Collingwood vs. Carlton, at IKON Park
- Height: 163 cm (5 ft 4 in)
- Position: Midfielder

Club information
- Current club: Collingwood
- Number: 8

Playing career^{1}
Years	Club	Games (Goals)
2017–	Collingwood	89 (10)
- ^{1} Playing statistics correct to the end of the 2026 season.

Career highlights
- AFL Women's All-Australian team: 2021; 2x Collingwood best and fairest: 2023, 2025

Brittany Bonnici (born 3 August 1997) is an Australian rules footballer playing for the Collingwood Football Club in the AFL Women's (AFLW).

== Early life and state football ==
Bonnici first played competitively with the under-11 boys of the Wallan Football Club. She has since then toured New Zealand as the vice-captain of the Australian AFL High Performance Academy, captained Victoria Metro Youth Girls to a national title in 2015, was selected three times for the Youth Girls All-Australians, and played for Melbourne in the 2015 exhibition match. Following a bad run of concussions in 2015, she only played two senior games for St Kilda Sharks in 2016. As a result of the concussions, she also started wearing a helmet during her games.

== AFL Women's career ==
Bonnici made her debut in round 1, 2017, in the inaugural AFLW match at IKON Park against Carlton. After round 6, she was nominated for the season's Rising Star award.

Collingwood re-signed Bonnici for the 2018 season during the trade period in May 2017.

Collingwood re-signed Bonnici for the 2019 season during the trade period in June 2018.

Bonnici had a successful season for Collingwood in 2021, awarded with her maiden All-Australian blazer, named on the interchange bench. She led the league for marks and disposals. Because of this, she was selected in Champion Data's 2021 AFLW All-Star stats team.

== Statistics ==
Statistics are correct to the end of the 2025 season

Legend
G	Goals	K	Kicks	D	Disposals	T	Tackles
B	Behinds	H	Handballs	M	Marks

Season	Team	No.	Games	Totals							Averages (per game)							Votes
Season	Team	No.	Games	G	B	K	H	D	M	T	G	B	K	H	D	M	T	Votes
2017	Collingwood	8	7	0	0	46	18	64	8	32	0.0	0.0	6.6	2.6	9.1	1.1	4.6	0
2018	Collingwood	8	7	1	0	45	33	78	14	24	0.1	0.0	6.4	4.7	11.1	2.0	3.4	0
2019	Collingwood	8	7	0	2	71	17	88	16	44	0.0	0.3	10.1	2.4	12.6	2.3	6.3	1
2020	Collingwood	8	7	0	1	95	42	137	25	30	0.0	0.1	13.6	6.0	19.6	3.6	4.3	7
2021	Collingwood	8	11	0	2	173	83	256^{†}	60^{§}	38	0.0	0.2	15.7	7.5	23.3^{†}	5.5^{§}	3.5	12
2022 (S6)	Collingwood	8	8	2	2	111	41	152	26	44	0.3	0.3	13.9	5.1	19.0	3.3	5.5	12
2022 (S7)	Collingwood	8	0	—	—	—	—	—	—	—	—	—	—	—	—	—	—	—
2023	Collingwood	8	10	1	1	139	44	183	29	65	0.1	0.1	13.9	4.4	18.3	2.9	6.5	12
2024	Collingwood	8	9	4	0	118	63	181	16	64	0.4	0.0	13.1	7.0	20.1	1.8	7.1	8
2025	Collingwood	8	11	0	1	158	99	257	25	98	0.0	0.1	14.4	9.0	23.4	2.3	8.9	10
Career			77	8	9	956	440	1396	219	439	0.1	0.1	12.4	5.7	18.1	2.8	5.7	62
