= 2022 AFL Women's season 6 =

Sixth season of the AFL Women's (AFLW) competition

Overview
- Date: 7 January – 9 April 2022
- Teams: 14
- Premiers: Adelaide; 3rd premiership
- Runners-up: Melbourne; 1st runners-up result
- Minor premiers: Adelaide; 2nd minor premiership
- Best and fairest: Emily Bates (Brisbane); 21 votes
- Leading goalkicker: Ashleigh Woodland (Adelaide); 19 goals

Attendance
- Matches played: 75
- Total attendance: 144,271 (1,924 per match)
- Highest (H&A): 5,533 (round 1, Fremantle v West Coast)
- Highest (finals): 16,712 (grand final, Adelaide v Melbourne)

2022 AFL Women's season 6 was the sixth season of the AFL Women's (AFLW) competition, the highest-level senior women's Australian rules football competition in Australia. The season featured 14 clubs and ran from 7 January to 9 April, comprising a ten-round home-and-away season followed by a three-week finals series featuring the top six clubs. It was the first of two seasons to take place in the 2022 calendar year, with the competition's seventh season held from August to November.

Adelaide won the premiership, defeating Melbourne by 13 points in the 2022 AFL Women's season 6 Grand Final; it was Adelaide's third AFL Women's premiership. Adelaide also won the minor premiership by finishing atop the home-and-away ladder with a 9–1 win–loss record. Brisbane's Emily Bates won the AFL Women's best and fairest award as the league's best and fairest player, and Adelaide's Ashleigh Woodland won the AFL Women's leading goalkicker award as the league's leading goalkicker.

== Format ==
The season was formatted mostly the same as the previous season, with each of the fourteen clubs ranked on a single ladder and the top six teams qualifying for the three-week, single-elimination finals series. The only change was extension of the home-and-away season by an additional round, allowing each team to play 10 matches. The season was originally planned to start in December 2021, but in August 2021 it was decided to delay this to January 2022 in the hope of minimising COVID-19 pandemic interruptions. This was the last season to be contested by 14 teams, with the four remaining AFL clubs (Essendon, Hawthorn, Port Adelaide and Sydney) joining the AFLW competition in 2023.

== Impact of COVID-19 pandemic ==
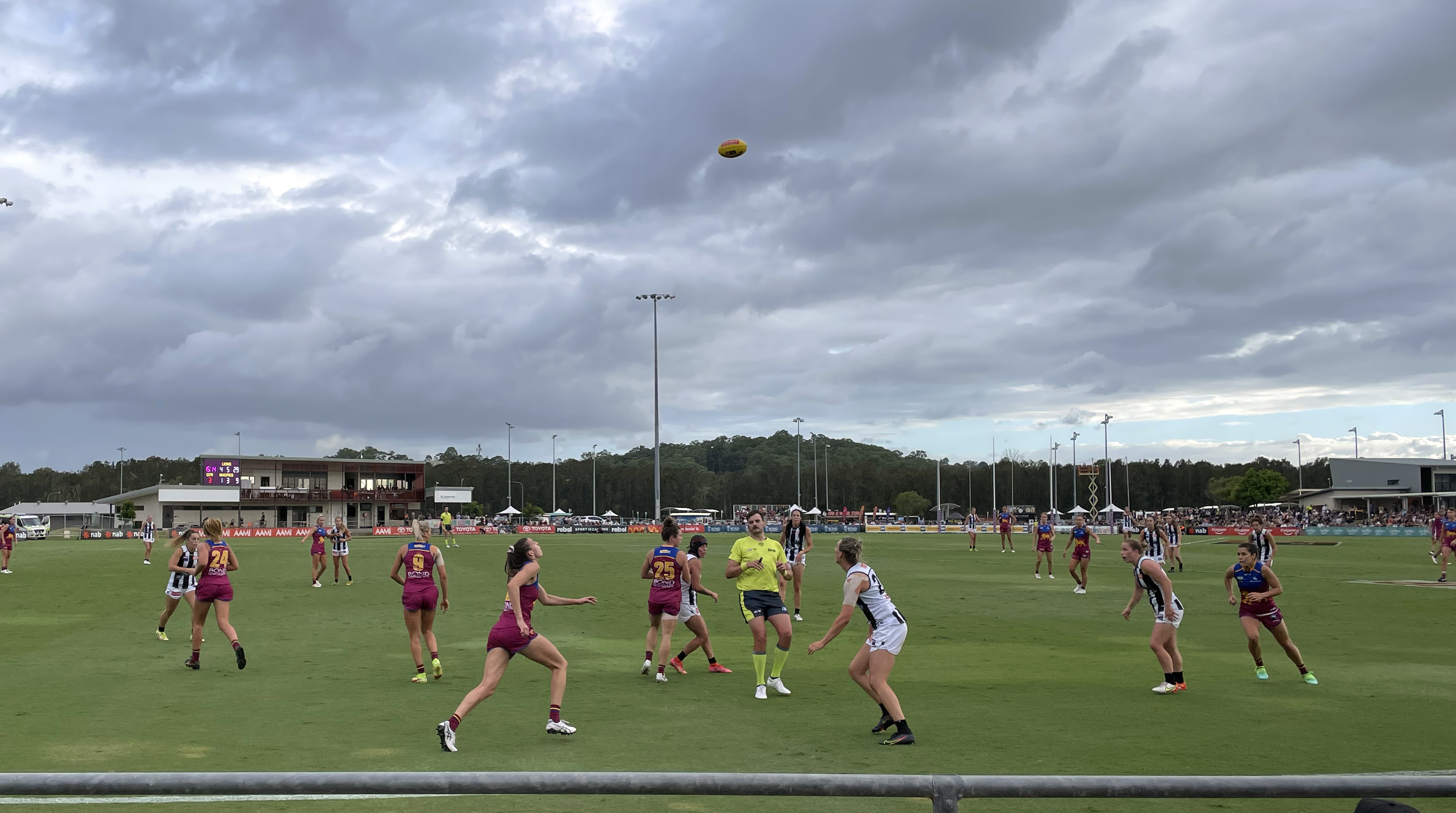
Tahlia Hickie (Brisbane Lions) competes in a ruck contest against Sophie Alexander (Collingwood) during the Lions' Round 5 victory over the Magpies at Maroochydore Multi Sports Complex.

The 2022 season was played during the third year of the COVID-19 pandemic. At the start of the season, the roll-out of Australia's original two-dose vaccination program was almost complete with more than 90% uptake. Across all states except for Western Australia, most social and interstate travel restrictions which had been in place through the latter half of 2021 had been lifted; cases of the virus, particularly the omicron variant which became dominant in December 2021, were widespread in the community for the first time in the pandemic; and confirmed cases and their close contacts were still required to test and isolate, although for shorter periods than earlier in the pandemic. In contrast, Western Australia opened the season with very few virus cases in its community, and with its state borders closed to the rest of Australia, with a planned full reopening date of 5 February 2022 which was later changed to a restricted reopening, with the full reopening indefinitely delayed.

The main impacts of the pandemic to the AFLW season were:

- The league implemented a Vaccination Policy requiring all players and football department staff to be vaccinated against COVID-19; equivalent requirements were implemented by some state governments.
- Fremantle and West Coast, following a Round 1 Western Derby in Fremantle, travelled to Victoria and were based there until the Western Australian borders had their restricted opening. Late season matches were brought forward into this window to try to minimize the impact of the border restrictions, while the league received permission for teams to travel into Western Australia for matches after the opening.
- A match Rescheduling Policy was put in place to allow for a match to be rescheduled, redrawn or cancelled if one of its clubs was unable to field at least 21 players – including at least 16 from its primary list with five train-on players – due to absences from the team.

== Home-and-away season ==
All starting times are local time. Source: Australian Football

=== Round 1 ===
	Round 1
Friday, 7 January (7:15 pm)	St Kilda 3.5 (23)	def. by	Richmond 10.1 (61)	Skybus Stadium (crowd: 3,324)	Report
Saturday, 8 January (5:10 pm)	North Melbourne 4.2 (26)	def.	Geelong 2.6 (18)	Arden Street Oval (crowd: 1,872)	Report
Saturday, 8 January (7:00 pm)	Western Bulldogs 3.4 (22)	def. by	Melbourne 6.10 (46)	Victoria University Whitten Oval (crowd: 2,571)	Report
Saturday, 8 January (5:50 pm)	Fremantle 6.7 (43)	def.	West Coast 2.3 (15)	Fremantle Oval (crowd: 5,533)	Report
Sunday, 9 January (1:40 pm)	Adelaide 6.3 (39)	def.	Brisbane Lions 1.3 (9)	Flinders University Stadium (crowd: 1,805)	Report
Sunday, 9 January (4:10 pm)	Carlton 3.7 (25)	def. by	Collingwood 6.8 (44)	Ikon Park (crowd: 3,511)	Report
Sunday, 9 January (5:10 pm)	Gold Coast 3.3 (21)	def. by	Greater Western Sydney 5.6 (36)	Great Barrier Reef Arena (crowd: 1,535)	Report

=== Round 2 ===
	Round 2
Friday, 14 January (7:10 pm)	Richmond 6.2 (38)	def. by	Melbourne 8.6 (54)	Swinburne Centre (crowd: 1,517)	Report
Saturday, 15 January (3:10 pm)	Collingwood 6.5 (41)	def.	St Kilda 2.2 (14)	Victoria Park (crowd: 2,546)	Report
Saturday, 15 January (7:10 pm)	Geelong 2.5 (17)	def. by	Carlton 4.7 (31)	GMHBA Stadium (crowd: 2,144)	Report
Sunday, 16 January (12:40 pm)	West Coast 5.3 (33)	def. by	Gold Coast 7.4 (46)	Victoria University Whitten Oval (crowd: 587) (Moved from Mineral Resources Park)	Report
Sunday, 16 January (2:40 pm)	Adelaide 5.7 (37)	def.	North Melbourne 3.6 (24)	Norwood Oval (crowd: 2,010)	Report
Sunday, 16 January (5:10 pm)	Fremantle 7.10 (52)	def.	Greater Western Sydney 2.8 (20)	Victoria University Whitten Oval (crowd: 667) (Moved from Fremantle Oval)	Report
	Bye; Brisbane Lions, Western Bulldogs
Western Bulldogs were scheduled to play Geelong, and Brisbane Lions were scheduled to play Carlton, but neither clubs could field a team due to COVID-19 absences. The schedule was altered on 13 January under the Rescheduling Policy, with Geelong redrawn to host Carlton, and the Bulldogs redrawn to play the Lions in a match which will be scheduled for a later date.

=== Round 3 ===
	Round 3
Friday, 21 January (7:10 pm)	Geelong 3.6 (24)	def. by	Collingwood 5.5 (35)	GMHBA Stadium (crowd: 2,265)	Report
Saturday, 22 January (12:40 pm)	West Coast 1.3 (9)	def. by	Adelaide 6.6 (42)	Swinburne Centre (crowd: 323) (Moved from Mineral Resources Park)	Report
Saturday, 22 January (3:10 pm)	Melbourne 9.10 (64)	def.	St Kilda 3.5 (23)	Casey Fields (crowd: 1,217)	Report
Saturday, 22 January (5:10 pm)	Richmond 7.5 (47)	def. by	Fremantle 11.11 (77)	Swinburne Centre (crowd: 1,078)	Report
Sunday, 23 January (1:10 pm)	North Melbourne 7.12 (54)	def.	Greater Western Sydney 4.3 (27)	Arden Street Oval (crowd: 1,157)	Report
Tuesday, 25 January (6:10 pm)	Brisbane Lions 9.9 (63)	def.	Carlton 4.4 (28)	Metricon Stadium (crowd: 814)	Report
	Bye; Gold Coast, Western Bulldogs
Two fixtures were cancelled; Gold Coast vs. Brisbane Lions and Western Bulldogs vs. Carlton, and the matches were re-arranged. The league scheduled Brisbane vs. Carlton for 25 January and Gold Coast vs. Western Bulldogs for 22 February.

=== Round 4 ===
	Round 4
Thursday, 27 January (5:40 pm)	Collingwood 1.1 (7)	def. by	Fremantle 5.8 (38)	Victoria Park (crowd: 1,257)	Report
Friday, 28 January (5:10 pm)	Greater Western Sydney 7.1 (43)	def.	Western Bulldogs 2.10 (22)	Henson Park (crowd: 2,683)	Report
Saturday, 29 January (2:40 pm)	Adelaide 4.11 (35)	def.	Melbourne 3.3 (21)	Norwood Oval (crowd: 2,405)	Report
Saturday, 29 January (4:10 pm)	Brisbane Lions 3.9 (27)	def.	Geelong 4.1 (25)	Maroochydore Multi Sports Complex (crowd: 1,832)	Report
Sunday, 30 January (3:10 pm)	Carlton 3.3 (21)	def. by	North Melbourne 7.9 (51)	Ikon Park (crowd: 2,329)	Report
Sunday, 30 January (4:10 pm)	Gold Coast 5.9 (39)	def.	Richmond 5.4 (34)	Metricon Stadium (crowd: 1,329)	Report
	Bye; St Kilda, West Coast

	Additional Match
Tuesday, 1 February (7:10 pm)	Western Bulldogs 2.7 (19)	def. by	Fremantle 3.7 (25)	Victoria University Whitten Oval (crowd: 913)	Report
Two matches were brought forward from rounds six and ten respectively in response to Western Australia's ongoing border closures; these matches have been marketed as "additional matches" rather than belonging to their original rounds. Most matches in this round had their timeslots changed in order to accommodate these additional matches. Due to COVID cases in West Coast's playing squad, their game was later returned to its previous round 6 fixture.

=== Round 5 ===
	Round 5
Friday, 4 February (7:10 pm)	Geelong 4.3 (27)	def.	West Coast 3.6 (24)	GMHBA Stadium (crowd: 1,938)	Report
Saturday, 5 February (4:10 pm)	Brisbane Lions 5.5 (35)	def.	Collingwood 1.5 (11)	Maroochydore Multi Sports Complex (crowd: 1,667)	Report
Saturday, 5 February (7:10 pm)	Melbourne 5.8 (38)	def.	Gold Coast 4.2 (26)	Casey Fields (crowd: 1,124)	Report
Sunday, 6 February (1:10 pm)	Western Bulldogs 4.6 (30)	def.	Richmond 1.7 (13)	Victoria University Whitten Oval (crowd: 2,159)	Report
Sunday, 6 February (3:10 pm)	Carlton 1.6 (12)	def. by	Adelaide 7.9 (51)	Ikon Park (crowd: 1,403)	Report
Sunday, 6 February (5:10 pm)	North Melbourne 3.8 (26)	def.	Fremantle 2.4 (16)	North Hobart Oval (crowd: 1,261)	Report
Tuesday, 8 February (5:10 pm)	St Kilda 2.8 (20)	def. by	West Coast 2.10 (22)	Wilson Storage Trevor Barker Beach Oval (crowd: 665)	Report
	Bye; Greater Western Sydney
The match between Greater Western Sydney and St Kilda was postponed due to COVID protocols, and St Kilda played a make-up game against West Coast.

=== Round 6 ===
	Round 6
Friday, 11 February (6:10 pm)	Gold Coast 7.7 (49)	def.	Geelong 6.2 (38)	Metricon Stadium (crowd: 683)	Report
Saturday, 12 February (2:10 pm)	Richmond 2.6 (18)	def. by	North Melbourne 5.7 (37)	Swinburne Centre (crowd: 1,093)	Report
Saturday, 12 February (4:10 pm)	Melbourne 6.8 (44)	def.	Greater Western Sydney 1.1 (7)	Casey Fields (crowd: 787)	Report
Saturday, 12 February (3:10 pm)	Fremantle 7.9 (51)	def.	Carlton 1.3 (9)	Fremantle Oval (crowd: 2,524)	Report
Sunday, 13 February (1:10 pm)	St Kilda 4.2 (26)	def. by	Brisbane Lions 3.13 (31)	Wilson Storage Trevor Barker Beach Oval (crowd: 1,010)	Report
Sunday, 13 February (12:10 pm)	West Coast 3.4 (22)	def. by	Collingwood 7.4 (46)	Mineral Resources Park (crowd: 1,295) (Moved from Victoria Park)	Report
Sunday, 13 February (4:40 pm)	Adelaide 7.6 (48)	def. by	Western Bulldogs 8.1 (49)	Norwood Oval (crowd: 2,181)	Report
Due to the AFL receiving exemptions for Victorian teams to enter Western Australia, West Coast and Fremantle were cleared to host matches and several changes were made to the fixture as a result.

=== Round 7 ===
	Round 7
Thursday, 17 February (6:40 pm)	Gold Coast 2.4 (16)	def. by	Brisbane Lions 12.13 (85)	Metricon Stadium (crowd: 1,105)	Report
Friday, 18 February (7:10 pm)	Western Bulldogs 3.10 (28)	def.	Geelong 2.4 (16)	Victoria University Whitten Oval (crowd: 1,530)	Report
Saturday, 19 February (3:10 pm)	Greater Western Sydney 0.5 (5)	def. by	Adelaide 5.15 (45)	Henson Park (crowd: 1,955)	Report
Saturday, 19 February (5:10 pm)	Carlton 7.6 (48)	def.	St Kilda 0.2 (2)	Ikon Park (crowd: 1,642)	Report
Saturday, 19 February (4:10 pm)	West Coast 7.3 (45)	def. by	Richmond 10.8 (68)	Mineral Resources Park (crowd: 878)	Report
Sunday, 20 February (3:10 pm)	North Melbourne 6.2 (38)	def.	Collingwood 2.3 (15)	North Hobart Oval (crowd: 869)	Report
Monday, 21 February (6:10 pm)	Brisbane Lions 4.8 (32)	def. by	Melbourne 5.5 (35)	Metricon Stadium (crowd: 790)	Report
Tuesday, 22 February (6:10 pm)	Gold Coast 6.5 (41)	drew with	Western Bulldogs 6.5 (41)	Metricon Stadium (crowd: 629)	Report
	Bye; Fremantle
Due to the impact of the COVID-19 pandemic, matches were added to this round, and some of the matches of the round were rescheduled.

=== Round 8 ===
	Round 8
Wednesday, 23 February (5:40 pm)	Greater Western Sydney 6.5 (41)	def.	St Kilda 5.9 (39)	Blacktown ISP Oval (crowd: 427)	Report
Saturday, 26 February (12:10 pm)	Fremantle 2.4 (16)	def. by	Adelaide 3.7 (25)	Fremantle Oval (crowd: 2,419)	Report
Saturday, 26 February (5:10 pm)	Richmond 1.4 (10)	def. by	Geelong 5.3 (33)	Swinburne Centre (crowd: 1,521)	Report
Saturday, 26 February (7:10 pm)	Melbourne 4.3 (27)	def.	North Melbourne 2.5 (17)	Casey Fields (crowd: 1,408)	Report
Sunday, 27 February (1:10 pm)	St Kilda 5.4 (34)	def.	Gold Coast 4.7 (31)	Wilson Storage Trevor Barker Beach Oval (crowd: 841)	Report
Sunday, 27 February (3:10 pm)	Collingwood 10.6 (66)	def.	Western Bulldogs 6.5 (41)	Victoria Park (crowd: 2,796)	Report
Sunday, 27 February (2:10 pm)	West Coast 4.0 (24)	def. by	Brisbane Lions 15.8 (98)	Mineral Resources Park (crowd: 730)	Report
Sunday, 27 February (7:10 pm)	Greater Western Sydney 5.3 (33)	def. by	Carlton 7.9 (51)	Manuka Oval (crowd: 1,839)	Report
Due to the impact of the COVID-19 pandemic, matches were added to this round, and some of the matches of the round were rescheduled.; Katherine Smith became the first player to kick a goal after the siren to win an AFLW match, resulting in Greater Western Sydney's two-point victory against St Kilda.; The Brisbane Lions's score of 15.8 (98) and winning margin of 74 points both set new records as the highest in the history of the competition.; Darcy Vescio of Carlton became the first player to kick 50 career goals in the league.

=== Round 9 ===
	Round 9
Saturday, 5 March (3:10 pm)	St Kilda 2.6 (18)	def.	Geelong 0.9 (9)	RSEA Park (crowd: 947)	Report
Saturday, 5 March (5:10 pm)	Greater Western Sydney 6.2 (38)	def. by	Richmond 7.4 (46)	GIANTS Stadium (crowd: 613) (Moved from Blacktown ISP Oval)	Report
Saturday, 5 March (4:00 pm)	Fremantle 3.1 (19)	def. by	Melbourne 16.11 (107)	Optus Stadium (crowd: 2,717) (Moved from Fremantle Oval)	Report
Saturday, 5 March (6:40 pm)	West Coast 1.2 (8)	def. by	Western Bulldogs 10.8 (68)	Optus Stadium (crowd: 3,164) (Moved from Mineral Resources Park)	Report
Sunday, 6 March (1:10 pm)	Brisbane Lions 7.8 (50)	def.	North Melbourne 2.2 (14)	Victoria University Whitten Oval (crowd: 695) (Moved from Maroochydore Multi Sports Complex)	Report
Sunday, 6 March (2:40 pm)	Adelaide 4.6 (30)	def.	Collingwood 4.4 (28)	Norwood Oval (crowd: 2,572)	Report
Sunday, 6 March (5:10 pm)	Carlton 7.4 (46)	def.	Gold Coast 2.4 (16)	Ikon Park (crowd: 1,052)	Report
Melbourne's score of 16.11 (107) and winning margin of 88 points both set new records as the highest in the history of the competition, breaking the records set just one round before.

=== Round 10 ===
	Round 10
Friday, 11 March (6:10 pm)	Geelong 5.5 (35)	def. by	Greater Western Sydney 8.5 (53)	GMHBA Stadium (crowd: 1,603)	Report
Saturday, 12 March (3:10 pm)	Collingwood 6.11 (47)	def.	Richmond 1.3 (9)	Victoria Park (crowd: 2,221)	Report
Saturday, 12 March (5:10 pm)	North Melbourne 9.5 (59)	def.	West Coast 3.2 (20)	Arden Street Oval (crowd: 1,032)	Report
Saturday, 12 March (7:10 pm)	Melbourne 5.4 (34)	def.	Carlton 5.3 (33)	Casey Fields (crowd: 1,309)	Report
Sunday, 13 March (1:10 pm)	St Kilda 2.2 (14)	def. by	Adelaide 7.11 (53)	RSEA Park (crowd: 1,174)	Report
Sunday, 13 March (3:10 pm)	Western Bulldogs 5.4 (34)	def. by	Brisbane Lions 10.6 (66)	Mars Stadium (crowd: 1,526)	Report
Sunday, 13 March (2:10 pm)	Fremantle 7.4 (46)	def.	Gold Coast 0.9 (9)	Fremantle Oval (crowd: 544)	Report
The original fixture released in December 2021 had Collingwood playing Gold Coast; Richmond playing Brisbane Lions; and Western Bulldogs playing Fremantle.

== Ladder ==
Pos	Team	Pld	W	L	D	PF	PA	PP	Pts	Qualification
1	Adelaide (P)	10	9	1	0	405	187	216.6	36	Finals series
2	Melbourne	10	9	1	0	470	252	186.5	36	Finals series
3	Brisbane	10	8	2	0	496	252	196.8	32	Finals series
4	North Melbourne	10	7	3	0	346	249	139.0	28	Finals series
5	Fremantle	10	7	3	0	383	284	134.9	28	Finals series
6	Collingwood	10	6	4	0	340	276	123.2	24	Finals series
7	Western Bulldogs	10	4	5	1	354	372	95.2	18	
8	Carlton	10	4	6	0	304	362	84.0	16	
9	Greater Western Sydney	10	4	6	0	303	409	74.1	16	
10	Gold Coast	10	3	6	1	294	431	68.2	14	
11	Richmond	10	3	7	0	344	423	81.3	12	
12	Geelong	10	2	8	0	242	301	80.4	8	
13	St Kilda	10	2	8	0	213	401	53.1	8	
14	West Coast	10	1	9	0	222	517	42.9	4	

Source: Womens.AFL
Rules for classification: 1) points; 2) percentage; 3) number of points for.
(P) Premiers

== Finals series ==
Qualifying finals
4	North Melbourne	4.7 (31)
5	Fremantle	11.3 (69)
3	Brisbane Lions	10.10 (70)
6	Collingwood	3.2 (20)

Preliminary finals
1	Adelaide	6.4 (40)
5	Fremantle	4.2 (26)
2	Melbourne	5.3 (33)
3	Brisbane Lions	4.5 (29)

Grand Final
Adelaide	4.5 (29)
Melbourne	2.4 (16)

=== Qualifying finals ===
	Qualifying finals
QF2: Saturday, 19 March (2:10 pm)	North Melbourne 4.7 (31)	def. by	Fremantle 11.3 (69)	Arden Street Oval (crowd: 1,274)	Report
QF1: Sunday, 27 March (12:05 pm)	Brisbane Lions 10.10 (70)	def.	Collingwood 3.2 (20)	Gabba (crowd: 2,675)	Report
The Brisbane Lions vs. Collingwood match was postponed eight days, as Collingwood fell below the minimum number of players needed to field a side due to a COVID-19 outbreak within the playing group. This caused the preliminary finals and grand final to each be pushed back one week.

=== Preliminary finals ===
	Preliminary finals
PF2: Saturday, 2 April (12:40pm)	Melbourne 5.3 (33)	def.	Brisbane Lions 4.5 (29)	MCG (crowd: 6,436)	Report
PF1: Saturday, 2 April (2:10pm)	Adelaide 6.4 (40)	def.	Fremantle 4.2 (26)	Adelaide Oval (crowd: 5,452)	Report

=== Grand final ===
	Grand Final
Saturday, 9 April (12:00 pm)	Adelaide 4.5 (29)	def.	Melbourne 2.4 (16)	Adelaide Oval (crowd: 16,712)	Report

== Awards ==
=== League awards ===
- The league best and fairest was awarded to Emily Bates of the Brisbane Lions, who polled 21 votes.
- The leading goalkicker was awarded to Ashleigh Woodland of Adelaide, who kicked 19 goals during the home and away season.
- The Rising Star was awarded to Mimi Hill of Carlton.
- The best on ground medal in the AFL Women's Grand Final was won by Anne Hatchard of Adelaide.
- The goal of the year was awarded to Ebony Antonio of Fremantle.
- The mark of the year was awarded to Tahlia Randall of North Melbourne.
- AFLW Players Association awards:
  - The most valuable player was awarded to Emily Bates of the Brisbane Lions.
  - The most courageous player was awarded to Kirsty Lamb of the Western Bulldogs.
  - The best captain was awarded to Daisy Pearce of Melbourne.
  - The best first year player was awarded to Charlie Rowbottom of Gold Coast.
- The AFLW Coaches Association awards:
  - The champion player of the year was awarded to Emily Bates of the Brisbane Lions.
  - The senior coach of the year was awarded to Mick Stinear of Melbourne.
- Emma Kearney was named captain of the All-Australian team. Nine of the fourteen clubs had at least one representative in the 21-woman team.
- The minor premiership was won by Adelaide.
- The wooden spoon was "won" by West Coast.

=== Best and fairests ===
Club	Award name	Player(s)	Ref.
Adelaide	Club Champion	Anne Hatchard	
Brisbane Lions	Best and fairest	Emily Bates	
Carlton	Best and fairest	Maddy Prespakis	
Collingwood	Best and fairest	Jaimee Lambert	
Fremantle	Fairest and best	Hayley Miller	
Geelong	Best and fairest	Amy McDonald	
Gold Coast	Club Champion	Alison Drennan	
Greater Western Sydney	Gabrielle Trainor Medal	Alyce Parker	
Melbourne	Best and fairest	Daisy Pearce	
North Melbourne	Best and fairest	Ashleigh Riddell	
Richmond	Best and fairest	Monique Conti	
St Kilda	Best and fairest	Bianca Jakobsson	
West Coast	Club Champion	Emma Swanson	
Western Bulldogs	Best and fairest	Ellie Blackburn & Kirsty Lamb	

=== Leading goalkickers ===
- Numbers highlighted in blue indicates the player led the season's goal kicking tally at the end of that round.
- Numbers underlined indicates the player did not play in that round.

Rank	Player	Team	1	2	3	4		5	6	7		8		9	10	Total
1	Ashleigh Woodland	Adelaide	4_{4}	4_{8}	2_{10}	0_{10}		0_{10}	2_{12}	2_{14}		1_{15}		2_{17}	2_{19}	19
2	Tayla Harris	Melbourne	1_{1}	2_{3}	3_{6}	1_{7}		2_{9}	2_{11}	2_{13}		2_{15}		3_{18}	0_{18}	18
2	Cora Staunton	Greater Western Sydney	2_{2}	2_{4}	1_{5}	1_{6}		0_{6}	0_{6}	0_{6}		3_{9}	2_{11}	3_{14}	4_{18}	18
4	Katie Brennan	Richmond	2_{2}	2_{4}	1_{5}	2_{7}		1_{8}	1_{9}	2_{11}		1_{12}		2_{14}	0_{14}	14
5	Tara Bohanna	Gold Coast	1_{1}	3_{4}	0_{4}	2_{6}		0_{6}	1_{7}	0_{7}	2_{9}	3_{12}		1_{13}	0_{13}	13
5	Daisy Pearce	Melbourne	0_{0}	1_{1}	1_{2}	2_{4}		1_{5}	1_{6}	0_{6}		0_{6}		5_{11}	2_{13}	13
7	Kate Hore	Melbourne	2_{2}	2_{4}	1_{5}	0_{5}		0_{5}	2_{7}	0_{7}		1_{8}		3_{11}	0_{11}	11
8	Greta Bodey	Brisbane Lions	1_{1}	0_{1}	2_{3}	0_{3}		1_{4}	1_{5}	0_{5}	1_{6}	2_{8}		0_{8}	2_{10}	10
8	Sophie Conway	Brisbane Lions	0_{0}	0_{0}	0_{0}	0_{0}		0_{0}	1_{1}	1_{2}	1_{3}	3_{6}		2_{8}	2_{10}	10
8	Jasmine Garner	North Melbourne	0_{0}	1_{1}	1_{2}	0_{2}		0_{2}	0_{3}	3_{6}		1_{7}		1_{8}	2_{10}	10
8	Phoebe McWilliams	Geelong	1_{1}	1_{2}	0_{2}	0_{2}		2_{4}	2_{6}	1_{7}		2_{9}		0_{9}	1_{10}	10
8	Bonnie Toogood	Western Bulldogs	1_{1}	0_{1}	0_{1}	0_{1}	1_{2}	1_{3}	2_{5}	2_{7}	0_{7}	0_{7}		2_{9}	1_{10}	10

== Coach changes ==
Club	Outgoing coach	Manner of departure	Date of vacancy	Incoming coach	Date of appointment
Greater Western Sydney	Alan McConnell	Resigned	25 March 2022	Cameron Bernasconi	12 April 2022

== Club leadership ==
Club	Coach	Captain(s)	Vice-captain(s)	Leadership group	Ref
Adelaide	Matthew Clarke	Chelsea Randall		Sarah Allan, Eloise Jones, Stevie-Lee Thompson	
Brisbane Lions	Craig Starcevich	Breanna Koenen	Emily Bates	Ally Anderson, Shannon Campbell, Sophie Conway, Nat Grider, Kate Lutkins, Cathy Svarc	
Carlton	Daniel Harford	Kerryn Harrington	Elise O'Dea, Darcy Vescio		
Collingwood	Stephen Symonds	Steph Chiocci, Brianna Davey	Brittany Bonnici, Stacey Livingstone, Ruby Schleicher		
Fremantle	Trent Cooper	Hayley Miller	Kiara Bowers, Angelique Stannett	Stephanie Cain, Gabby O'Sullivan	
Geelong	Daniel Lowther	Meg McDonald	Nina Morrison	Julia Crockett-Grills, Chantel Emonson, Madeline Keryk, Georgie Rankin	
Gold Coast	Cameron Joyce	Hannah Dunn	Bess Keaney	Jamie Stanton, Serene Watson	
Greater Western Sydney	Alan McConnell	Alicia Eva	Nicola Barr, Chloe Dalton, Alyce Parker, Pepa Randall, Cora Staunton		
Melbourne	Mick Stinear	Daisy Pearce	Karen Paxman	Libby Birch, Maddi Gay, Tyla Hanks, Kate Hore, Sarah Lampard, Lily Mithen, Lauren Pearce	
North Melbourne	Darren Crocker	Emma Kearney	Emma King	Nicole Bresnehan, Jasmine Garner, Danielle Hardiman, Ashleigh Riddell	
Richmond	Ryan Ferguson	Katie Brennan	Harriet Cordner, Sarah Hosking		
St Kilda	Nick Dal Santo	Hannah Priest	Kate Shierlaw, Rhiannon Watt	Bianca Jakobsson, Tilly Lucas-Rodd	
West Coast	Michael Prior	Emma Swanson	Dana Hooker	Parris Laurie, Aisling McCarthy	
Western Bulldogs	Nathan Burke	Ellie Blackburn	Brooke Lochland	Ashleigh Guest, Bailey Hunt, Isabel Huntington, Kirsty Lamb, Bonnie Toogood	
