= Stacey Livingstone =

Australian rules footballer

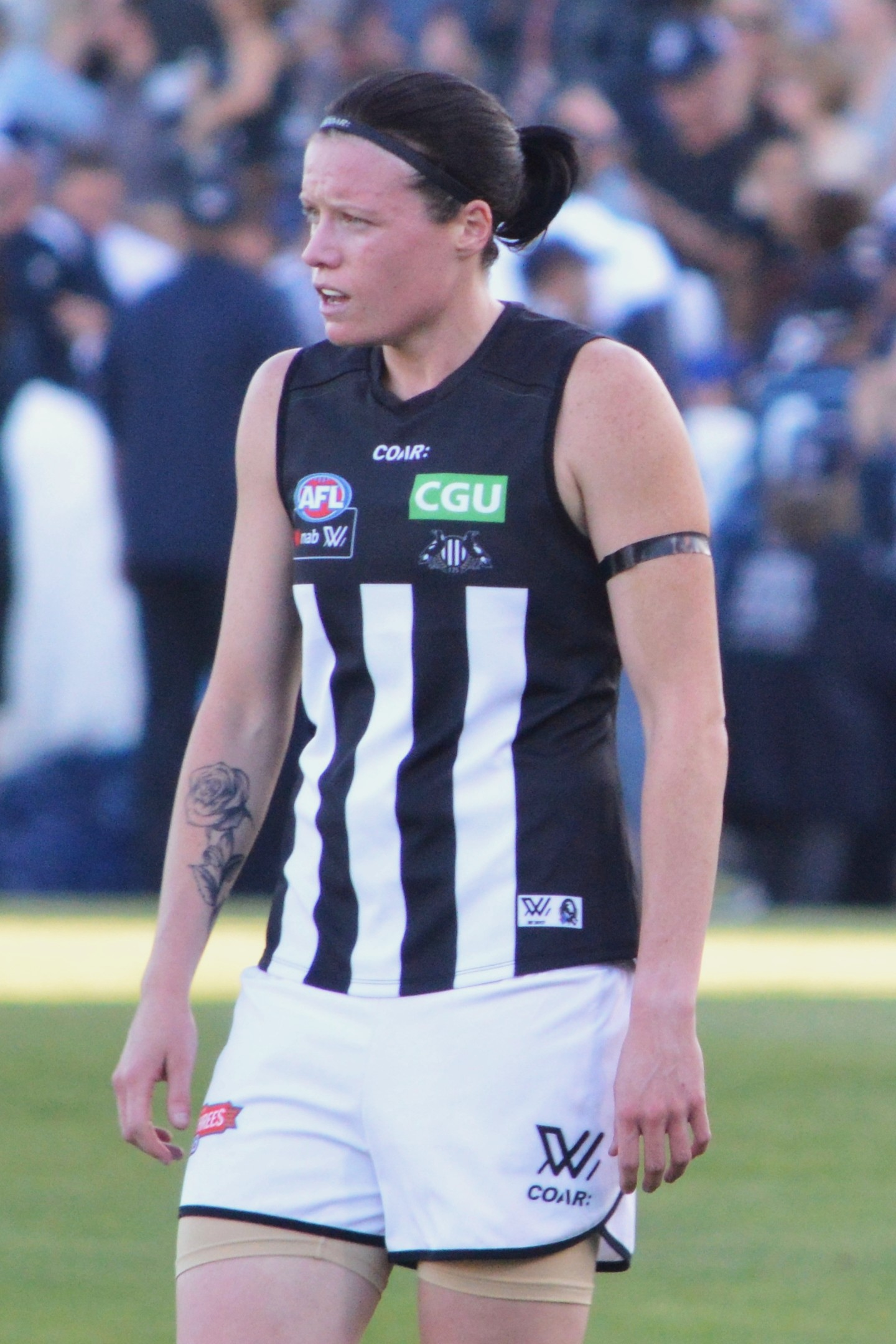
- Livingstone playing for Collingwood in February 2017

Personal information
- Full name: Stacey Livingstone
- Born: 23 January 1988 (age 38); New South Wales
- Original team: Port Melbourne Colts / Eastern Devils (VWFL)
- Draft: No. 70, 2016 national draft
- Debut: Round 1, 2017, Collingwood vs. Carlton, at IKON Park
- Height: 176 cm (5 ft 9 in)
- Position: Defender

Playing career^{1}
Years	Club	Games (Goals)
2017–2024	Collingwood	77 (1)
- ^{1} Playing statistics correct to the end of the 2024 season.

Stacey Livingstone (born 23 January 1988) is a retired Australian rules footballer who played for Collingwood in the AFL Women's (AFLW).

== Early life and state football ==
Livingstone was born in New South Wales but raised in Queensland.

She began playing in Victoria with Port Melbourne Colts in the VWFL as a ruck and forward, in the 2015 and 2016 seasons, scoring 24 goals in 15 matches in the 2016 season in the premier division.

She spent time at the state academy in early 2016, playing down back and developing as a defender.

She played VFLW with the Eastern Devils in 2017 before being drafted to the AFLW.

== AFL Women's career ==
Livingstone was drafted by Collingwood at pick 70 with their 9th overall pick, scheduled to play a role as a key defender for the club, despite playing as a ruck and forward for Port Melbourne Colts at state level. She made her debut in round 1, 2017, in the inaugural AFLW match at IKON Park against Carlton, which she ended on the interchange bench due to a shoulder injury. She started the season weakly, with commentators saying she had to find another gear for Collingwood to rescue their season.

Collingwood re-signed Livingstone for the 2018 season during the trade period in May 2017.

In May 2018, Livingstone was re-signed by Collingwood for the 2019 season.

It was revealed Livingstone had signed on with Collingwood for the 2022 season 6 on 10 June 2021.

In November 2024, ahead of the last game of the 2024 AFL Women's season, Livingstone announced her retirement from football.

== Statistics ==
Statistics are correct to the end of the 2024 season.

Legend
G	Goals	K	Kicks	D	Disposals	T	Tackles
B	Behinds	H	Handballs	M	Marks

Season	Team	No.	Games	Totals							Averages (per game)							Votes
Season	Team	No.	Games	G	B	K	H	D	M	T	G	B	K	H	D	M	T	Votes
2017	Collingwood	12	7	0	0	43	7	50	16	8	0.0	0.0	6.1	1.0	7.1	2.3	1.1	0
2018	Collingwood	12	2	0	0	12	2	14	4	5	0.0	0.0	6.0	1.0	7.0	2.0	2.5	0
2019	Collingwood	12	7	0	0	65	2	67	6	9	0.0	0.0	9.3	0.3	9.6	0.9	1.3	0
2020	Collingwood	12	7	0	0	56	13	69	17	11	0.0	0.0	8.0	1.9	9.9	2.4	1.6	0
2021	Collingwood	12	11	0	0	121	20	141	38	14	0.0	0.0	11.0	1.8	12.8	3.5	1.3	0
2022 (S6)	Collingwood	12	11	0	0	72	25	97	25	9	0.0	0.0	6.5	2.3	8.8	2.3	0.8	1
2022 (S7)	Collingwood	12	12	0	0	89	25	114	35	12	0.0	0.0	7.4	2.1	9.5	2.9	1.0	1
2023	Collingwood	12	9	0	0	57	10	67	22	17	0.0	0.0	6.3	1.1	7.4	2.4	1.9	0
2024	Collingwood	12	11	1	2	72	18	90	19	20	0.1	0.2	6.5	1.6	8.2	1.7	1.8	0
Career			77	1	2	587	122	709	182	105	0.01	0.03	7.6	1.6	9.2	2.4	1.4	2
