= Katherine Smith (footballer) =

Australian rules footballer

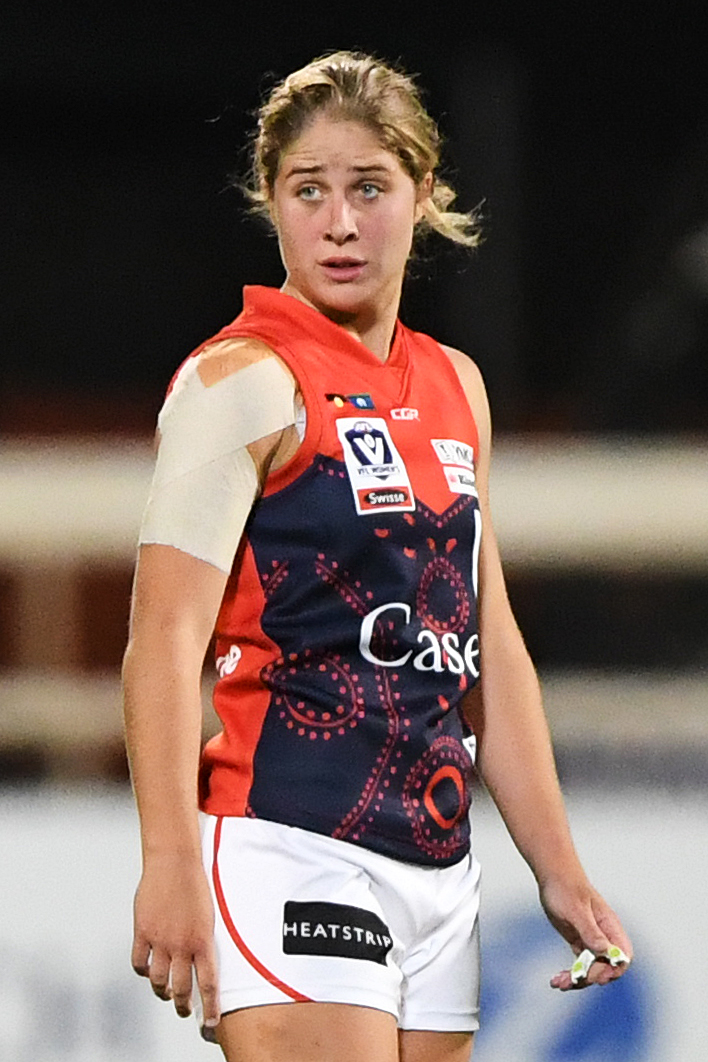
- Smith playing for Casey Demons in July 2019

Personal information
- Born: 28 September 1998 (age 28)
- Original team: Eastern Devils (VFL Women's)
- Draft: No. 56, 2016 AFL Women's draft
- Debut: Round 1, 2017, Melbourne vs. Brisbane, at Casey Fields
- Height: 164 cm (5 ft 5 in)
- Position: Midfielder / defender

Club information
- Current club: Greater Western Sydney
- Number: 4

Playing career^{1}
Years	Club	Games (Goals)
2017–2020	Melbourne	21 (2)
2021–2025	Greater Western Sydney	34 (4)
Total		55 (6)
- ^{1} Playing statistics correct to the end of the 2023 season.

Katherine Smith (born 28 September 1998) is a former Australian rules footballer who last played for Greater Western Sydney in the AFL Women's competition. She was drafted by Melbourne with their seventh selection and 56th overall in the 2016 AFL Women's draft. She made her debut in the 15-point loss to Brisbane at Casey Fields in the opening round of the 2017 season. After the two-point win against Adelaide at TIO Stadium in Round 6—in which she recorded ten disposals and a mark—she was the round nominee for the AFLW Rising Star. She played every match in her debut season to finish with seven games.

Melbourne signed Smith for the 2018 season during the trade period in May 2017. She suffered an ACL injury in December 2019, and missed the entire 2020 season. She joined the Greater Western Sydney Giants during the 2020 trade season, traded for draft picks 29 and 42, and played her first game for the Giants on 27 February 2021. On 23 February 2022, Smith became the first player in AFL Women's history to kick a match-winning goal after the final siren in the Giants' Round 7 match against St Kilda. In 2026, Smith announced her retirement from the AFLW.

Smith is currently studying a Bachelor of Exercise and Sport Science/Bachelor of Business (Sport Management) at Deakin University.

Smith is currently in a relationship with her partner Nikola.
