= List of AFL Women's best and fairest winners =

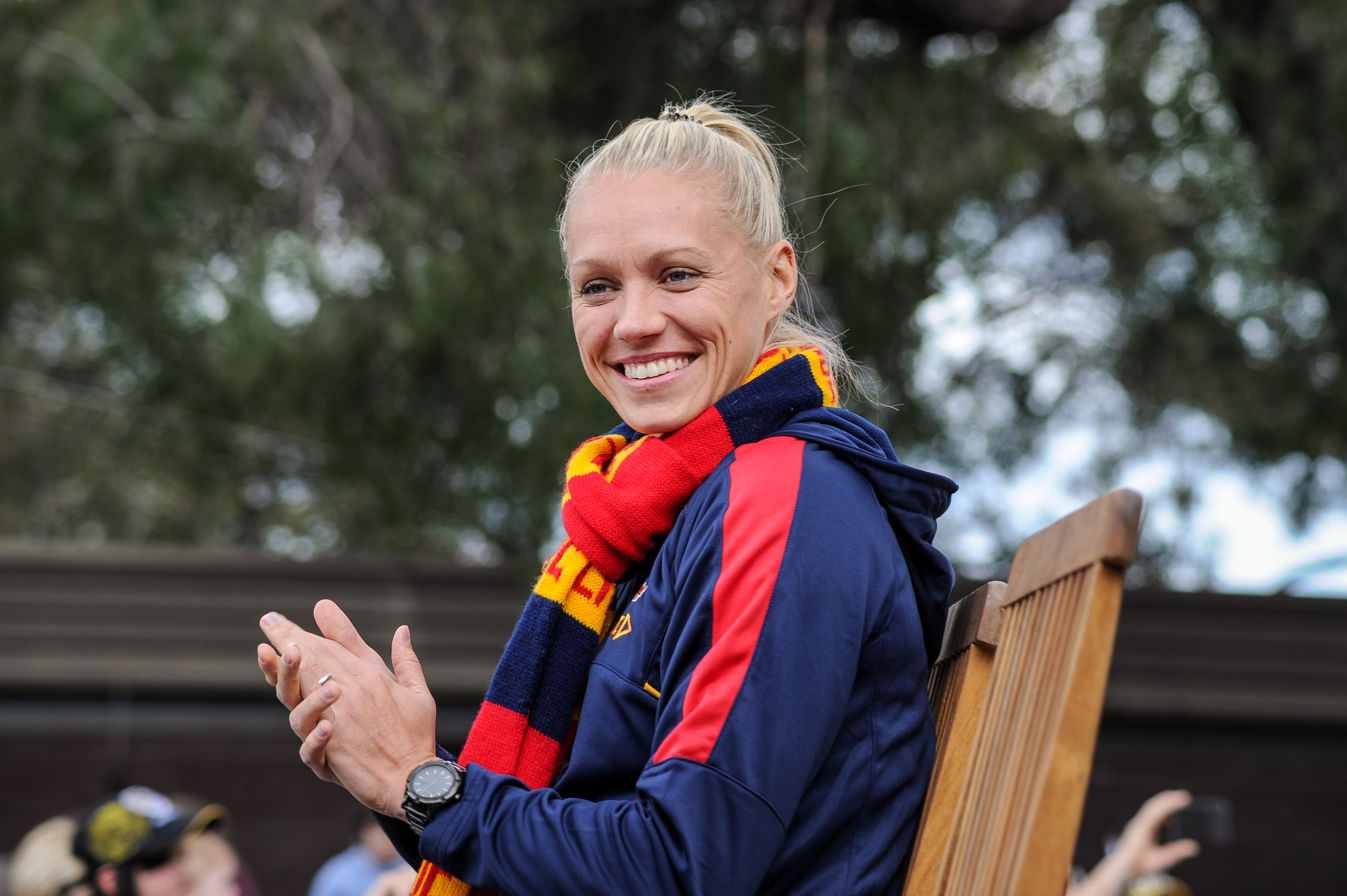
Erin Phillips was the inaugural winner of the award in 2017, and won it again in 2019.

The AFL Women's best and fairest is awarded to the best and fairest player in the AFL Women's (AFLW) during the home-and-away season, as determined by votes cast by the officiating field umpires after each game. It is the most prestigious award for individual players in the AFL Women's. It is also widely acknowledged as the highest individual honour in women's Australian rules football.

The award has been awarded every year since 2017. Erin Phillips of the Adelaide Football Club was the inaugural winner of the award.

== List of winners ==
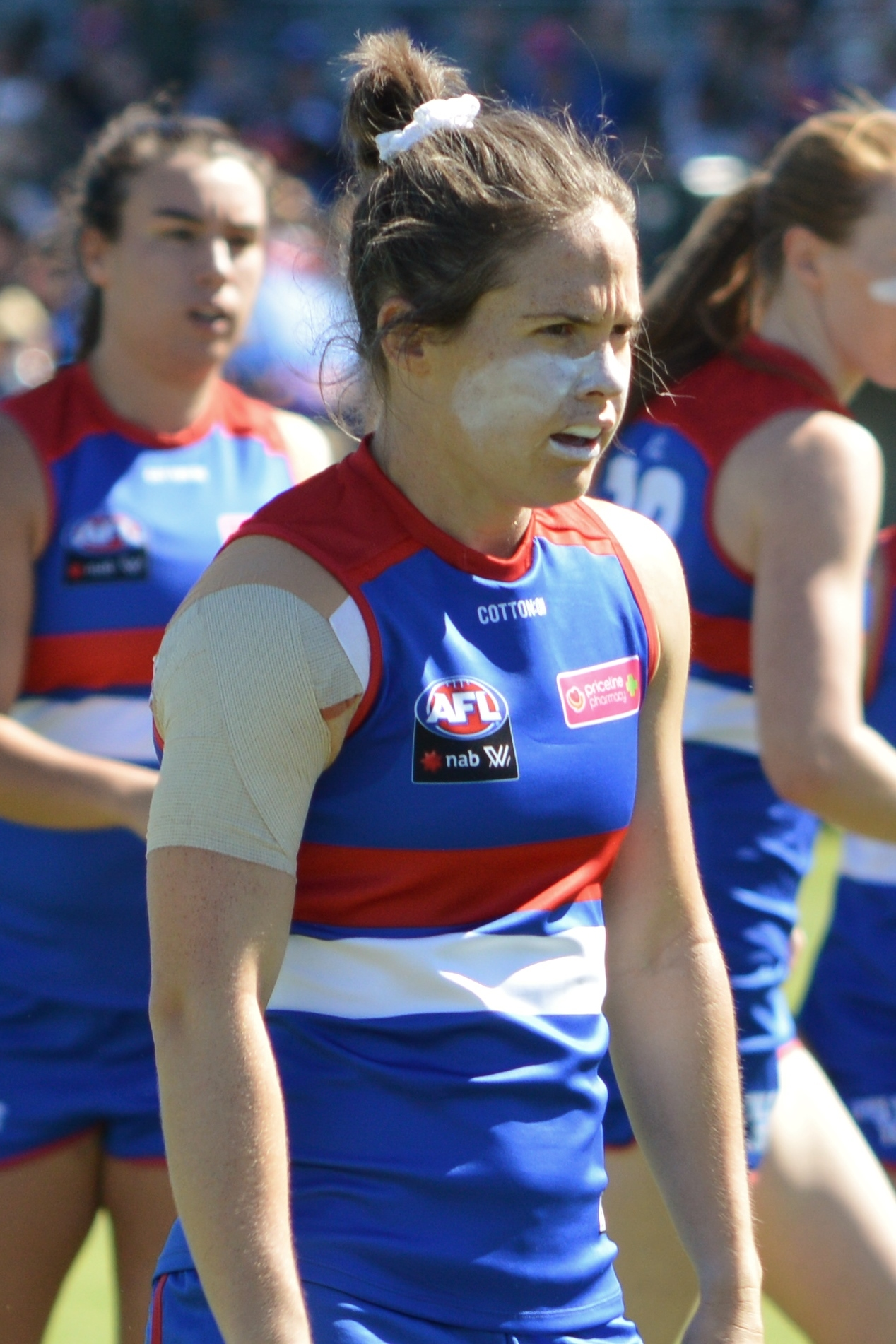
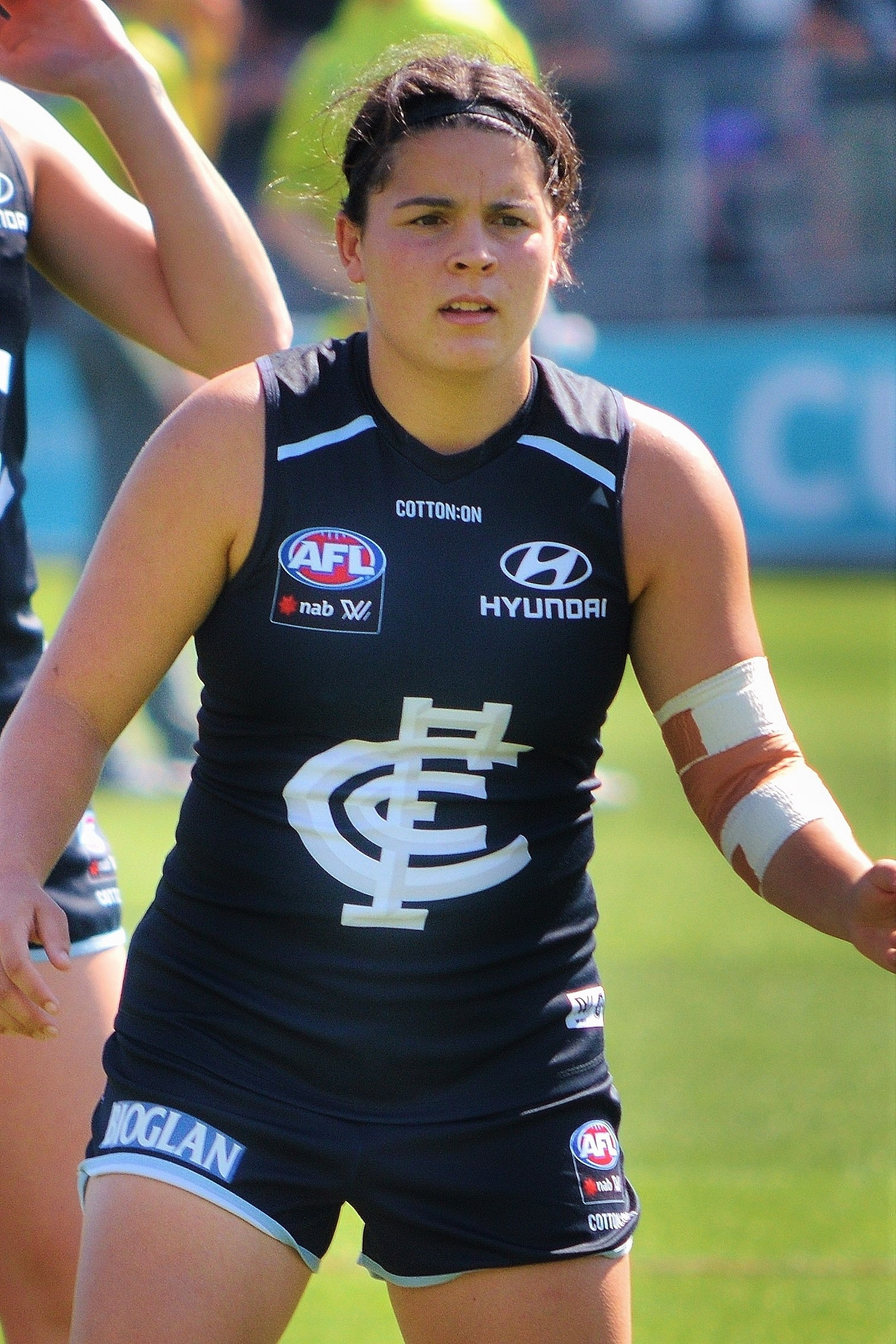
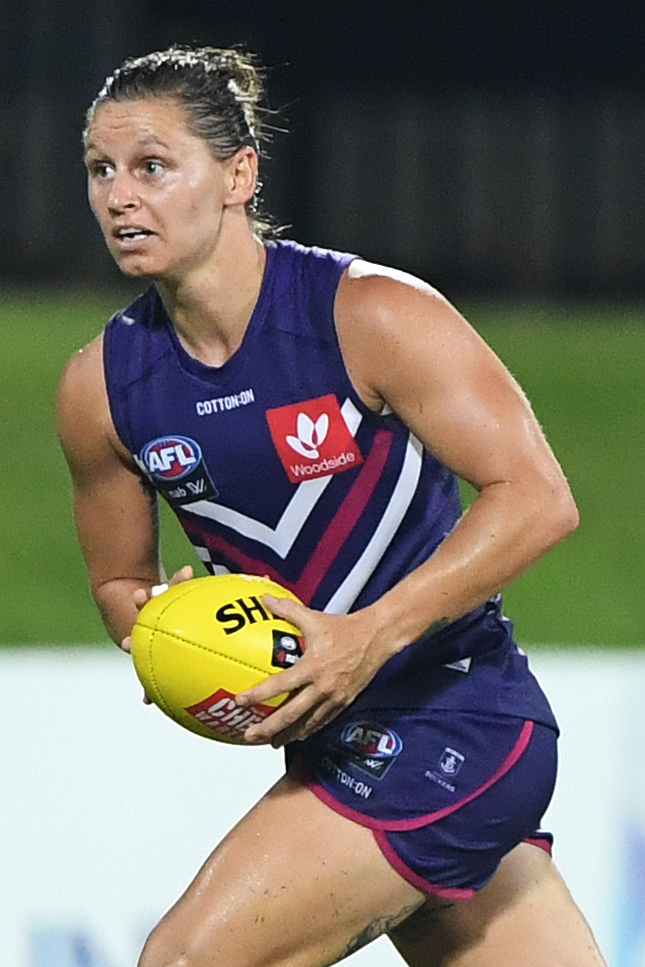
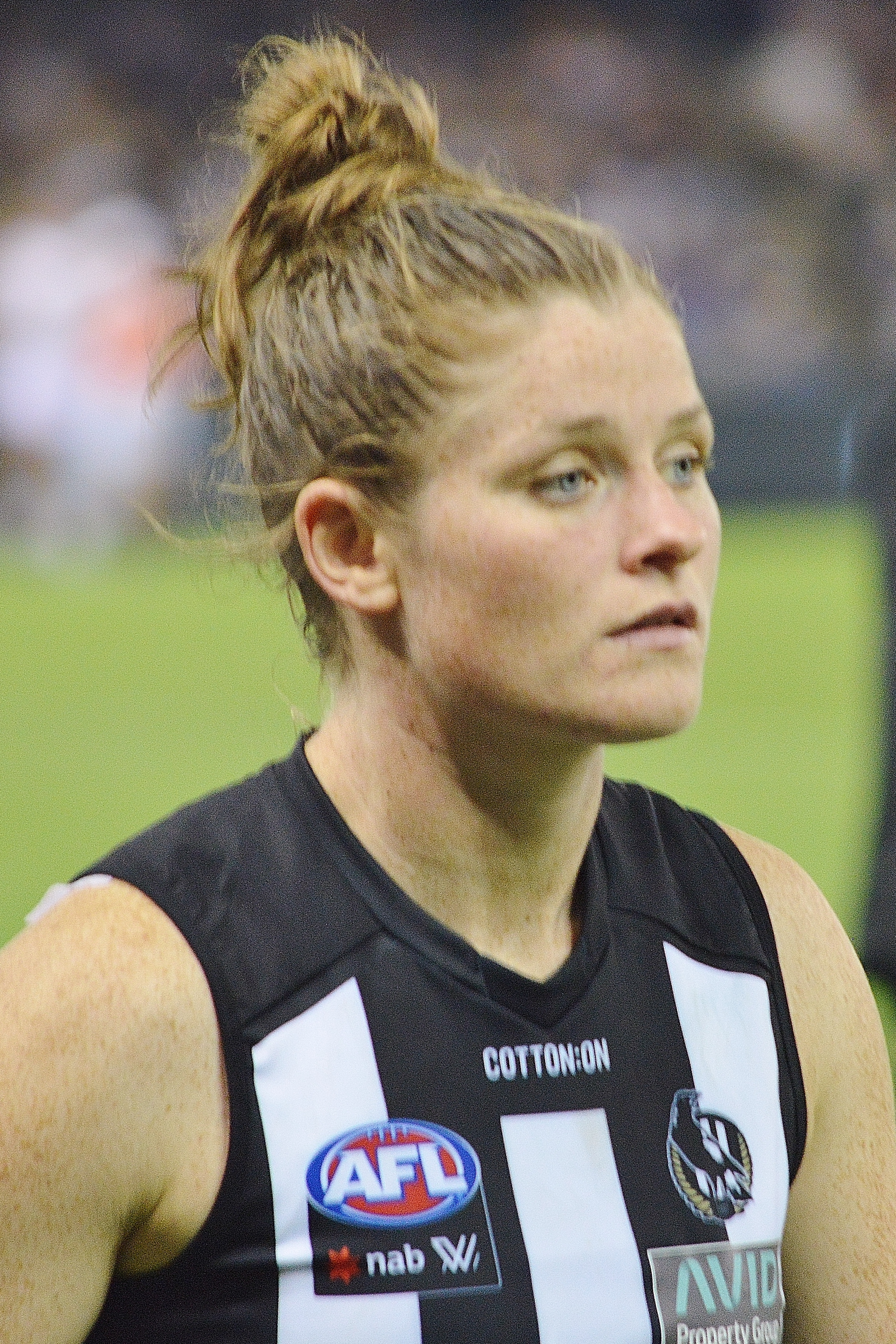
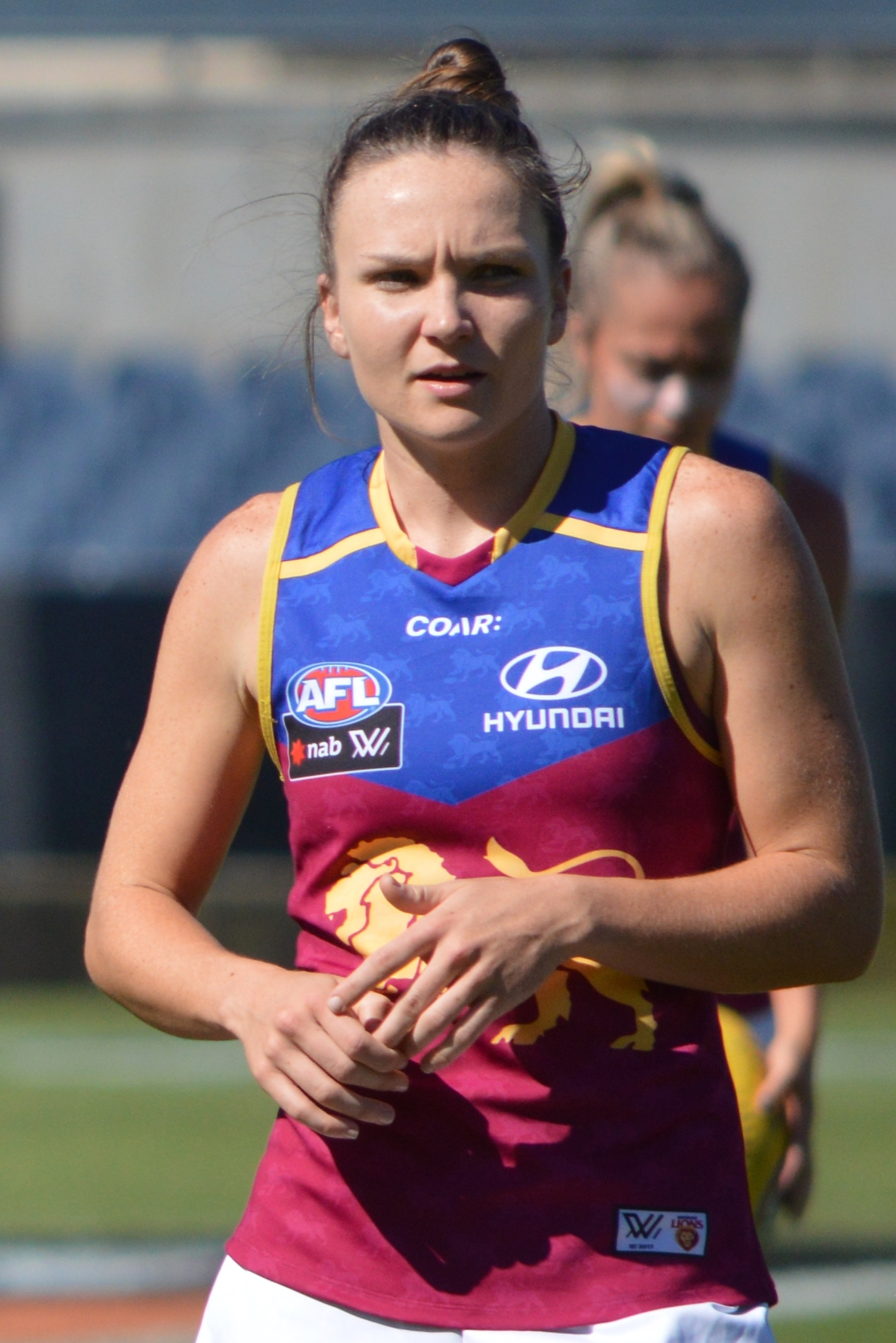
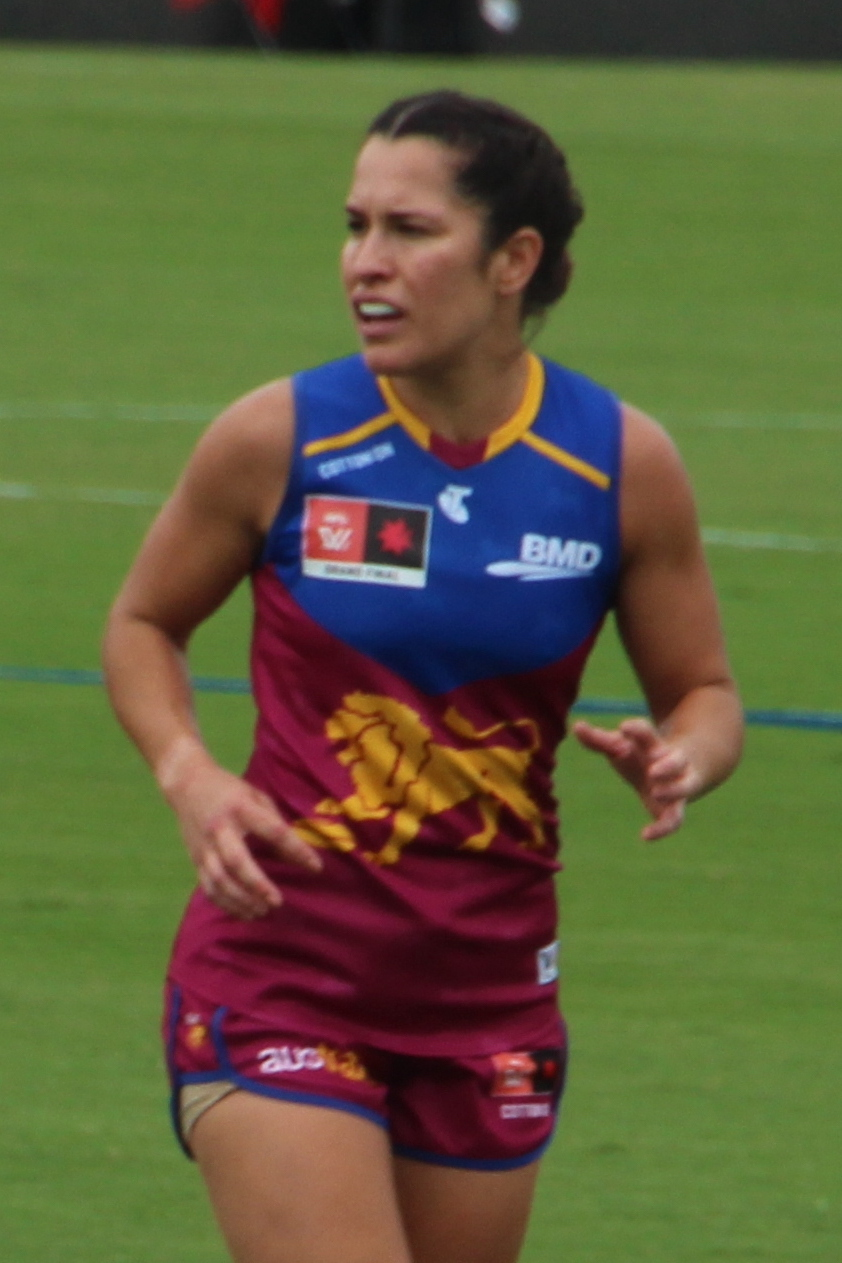
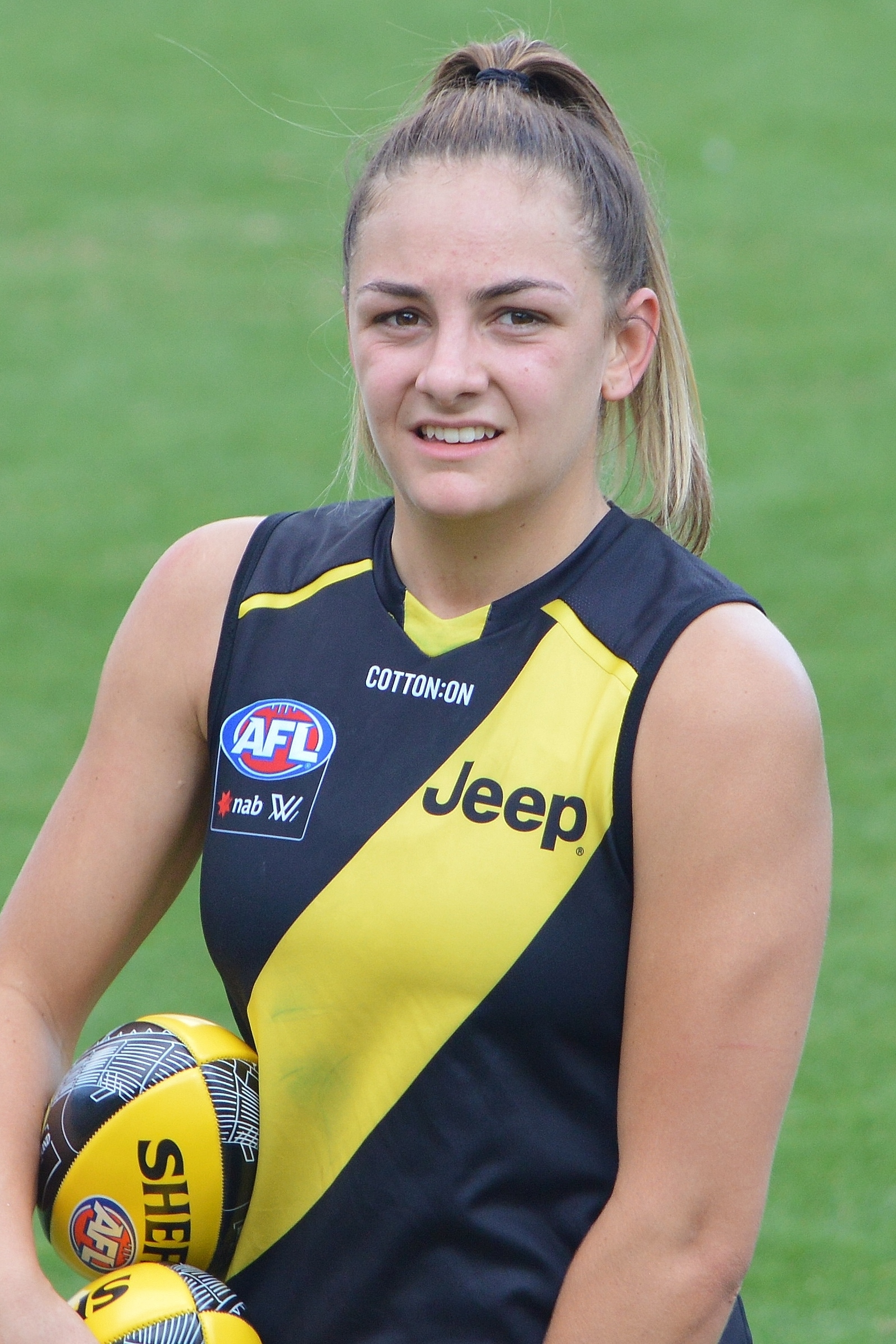
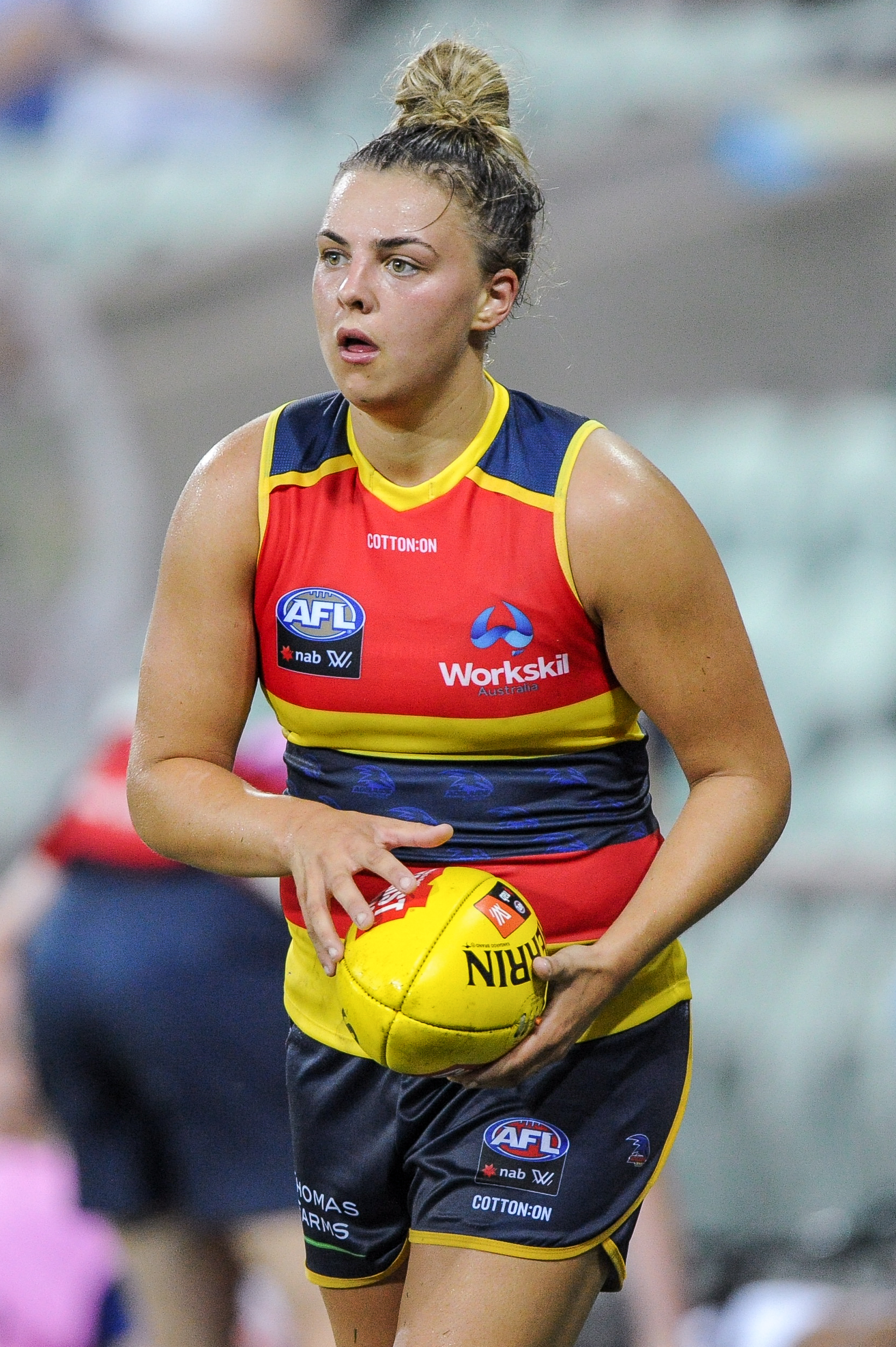
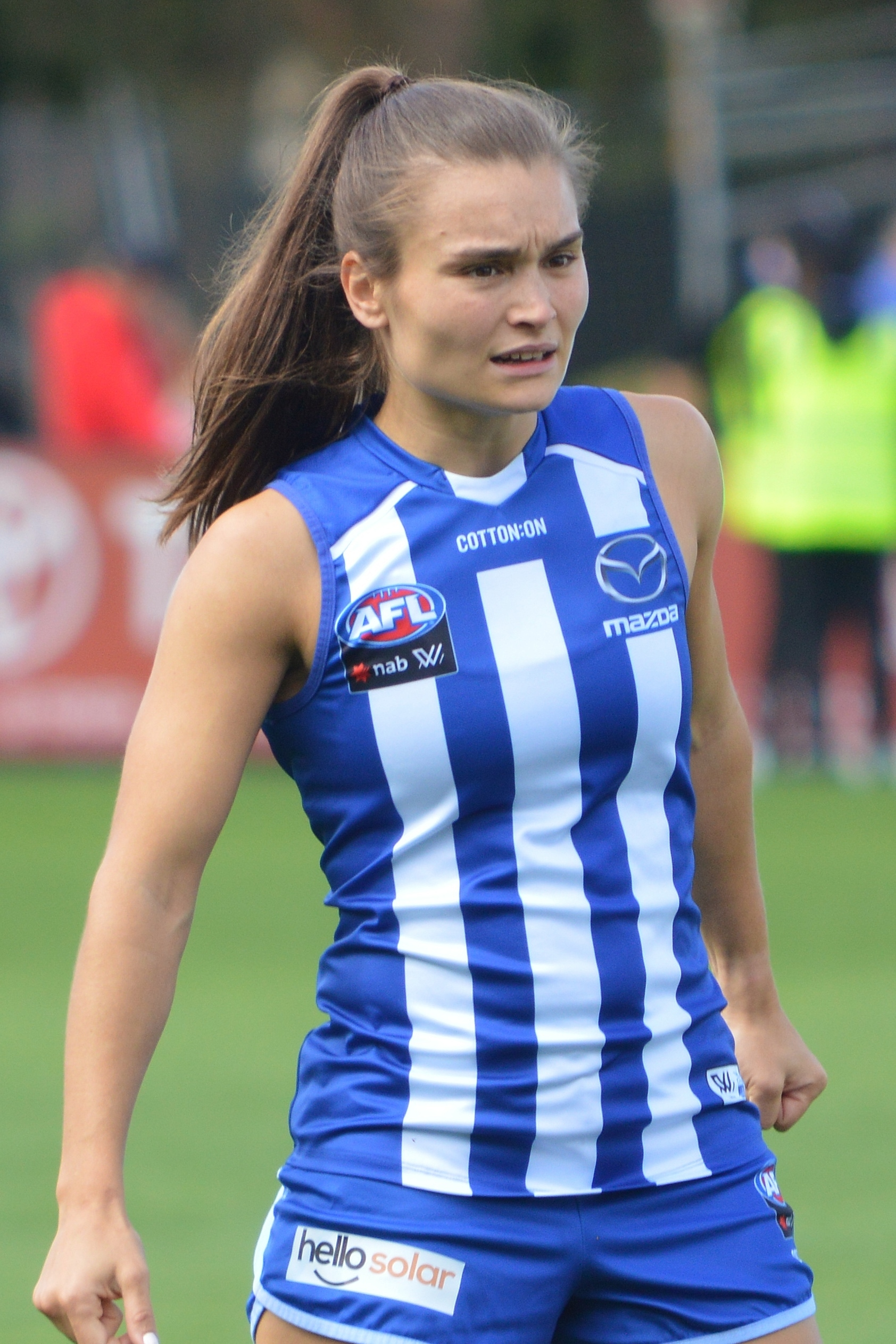
From left to right, top to bottom: 2018 winner Emma Kearney, 2020 winner Maddy Prespakis, 2021 joint winners Kiara Bowers and Brianna Davey, season 6 winner Emily Bates, season 7 winner Ally Anderson, 2023 winner Monique Conti, 2024 winner Ebony Marinoff, and 2025 winner Ash Riddell

Season	Player	Team	Other accolades won during the same season	Votes	Ref.
2017	Erin Phillips	Adelaide	2017 AFL Women's premiership (c); 2017 AFL Women's Grand Final best-on-ground 2017 AFLPA AFLW most valuable player 2017 AFL Women's All-Australian team 2017 Adelaide Club Champion; 2017 AFL Women's Goal of the Year	14	
2018	Emma Kearney	Western Bulldogs	2018 AFL Women's premiership 2018 AFL Women's All-Australian team 2018 Western Bulldogs best and fairest	14	
2019	Erin Phillips (2)	Adelaide	2019 AFL Women's premiership (c); 2019 AFL Women's Grand Final best-on-ground 2019 AFLPA AFLW most valuable player 2019 AFLCA AFLW champion player of the year 2019 AFL Women's All-Australian team (c); 2019 Adelaide Club Champion	19	
2020	Maddy Prespakis	Carlton	2020 AFL Women's All-Australian team 2020 Carlton best and fairest	15	
2021	Kiara Bowers	Fremantle	2021 AFLCA AFLW champion player of the year 2021 AFL Women's All-Australian team 2021 Fremantle fairest and best	15	
2021	Brianna Davey	Collingwood	2021 AFLPA AFLW most valuable player 2021 AFL Women's All-Australian team (c); 2021 Collingwood best and fairest	15	
2022 (S6)	Emily Bates	Brisbane	2022 season 6 AFLPA AFLW most valuable player 2022 season 6 AFLCA AFLW champion player of the year 2022 AFL Women's season 6 All-Australian team 2022 season 6 Brisbane best and fairest	21	
2022 (S7)	Ally Anderson	Brisbane		21	
2023	Monique Conti	Richmond	2023 AFL Women's All-Australian team 2023 Richmond best and fairest	23	
2024	Ebony Marinoff	Adelaide	2024 AFLPA AFLW most valuable player 2024 AFLCA AFLW champion player of the year 2024 AFL Women's All-Australian team 2024 AFLPA AFLW best captain 2024 Adelaide Club Champion	23	
2025	Ash Riddell	North Melbourne	2025 AFLCA AFLW champion player of the year 2025 AFL Women's All-Australian team	23	

== Voting system ==
The voting system for the award has remained the same since its inception in 2017, and is the same as that which has been used for the Australian Football League (AFL)'s Brownlow Medal from 1931–1975 and 1978–present. In this system, the three field umpires confer after each home-and-away match and award three votes, two votes and one vote to the players they regard as the best, second-best and third-best in the match, respectively.
