= 2023 AFL Women's best and fairest =

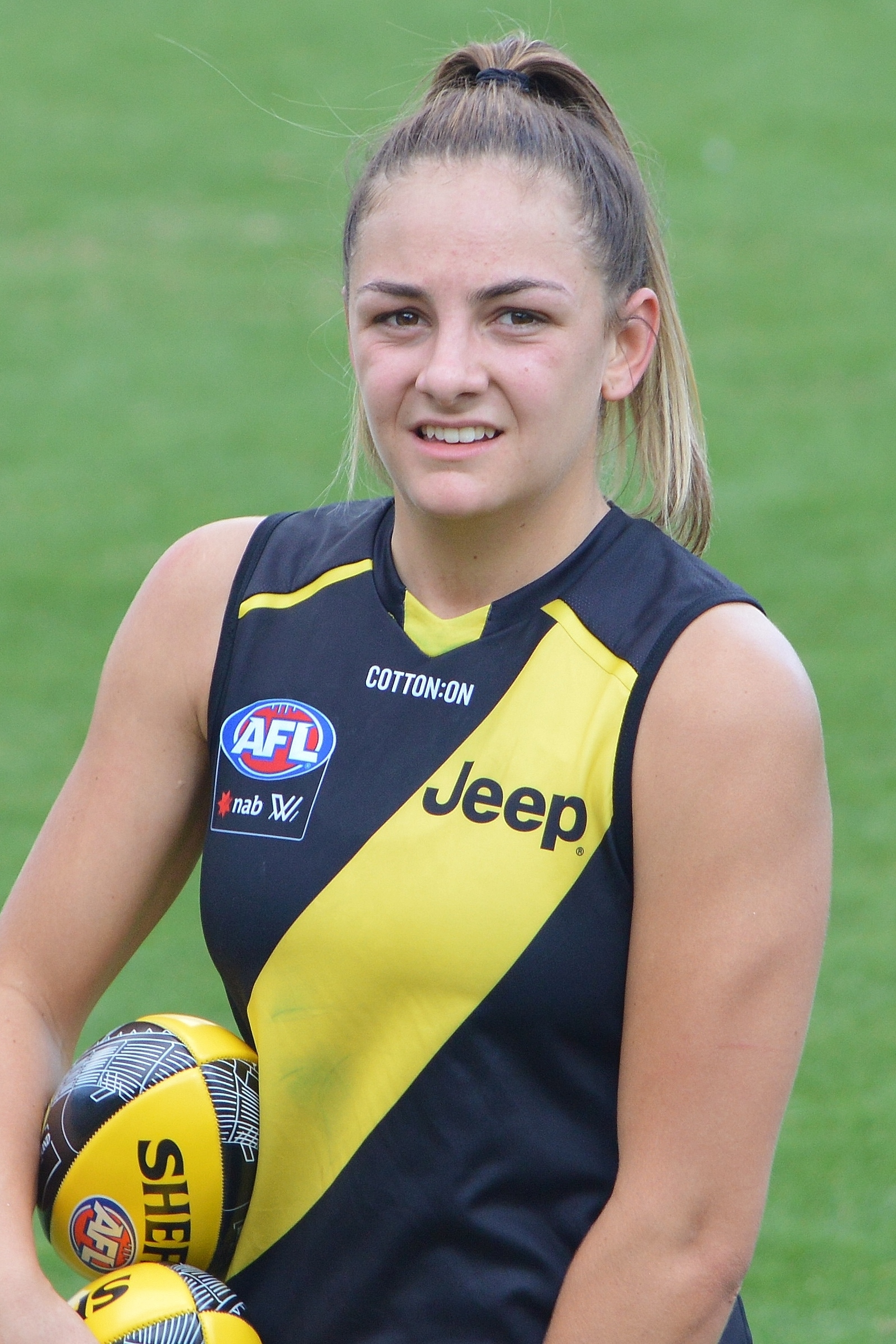
- Monique Conti, 2023 winner
- Date: 27 November 2023
- Venue: Crown Melbourne
- Hosted by: Sarah Jones
- Winner: Monique Conti (Richmond)

Television/radio coverage
- Network: Fox Footy

The 2023 AFL Women's best and fairest award was presented to the player adjudged the best and fairest player during the 2023 AFL Women's season. Richmond's Monique Conti won the award with 23 votes, an AFLW record.

== Leading votegetters ==
Placing	Player	Votes
1	Monique Conti (Richmond)	23
2	Amy McDonald (Geelong)	16
2	Chloe Molloy (Sydney)	16
2	Ash Riddell (North Melbourne)	16
2	Claudia Whitfort (Gold Coast)	16
6	Bonnie Toogood (Essendon)	15
7	Ally Anderson (Brisbane)	14
7	Jasmine Garner (North Melbourne)	14
7	Georgie Prespakis (Geelong)	14
10	Anne Hatchard (Adelaide)	13

== Voting procedure ==
The three field umpires (the umpires who control the flow of the game, as opposed to goal or boundary umpires) confer after each match and award three votes, two votes and one vote to the players they regard as the best, second-best and third-best in the match, respectively. The votes are kept secret until the awards night, and are read and tallied on the evening.
