= Erin Phillips =

Australian rules footballer (born 1985)

Erin Phillips OAM
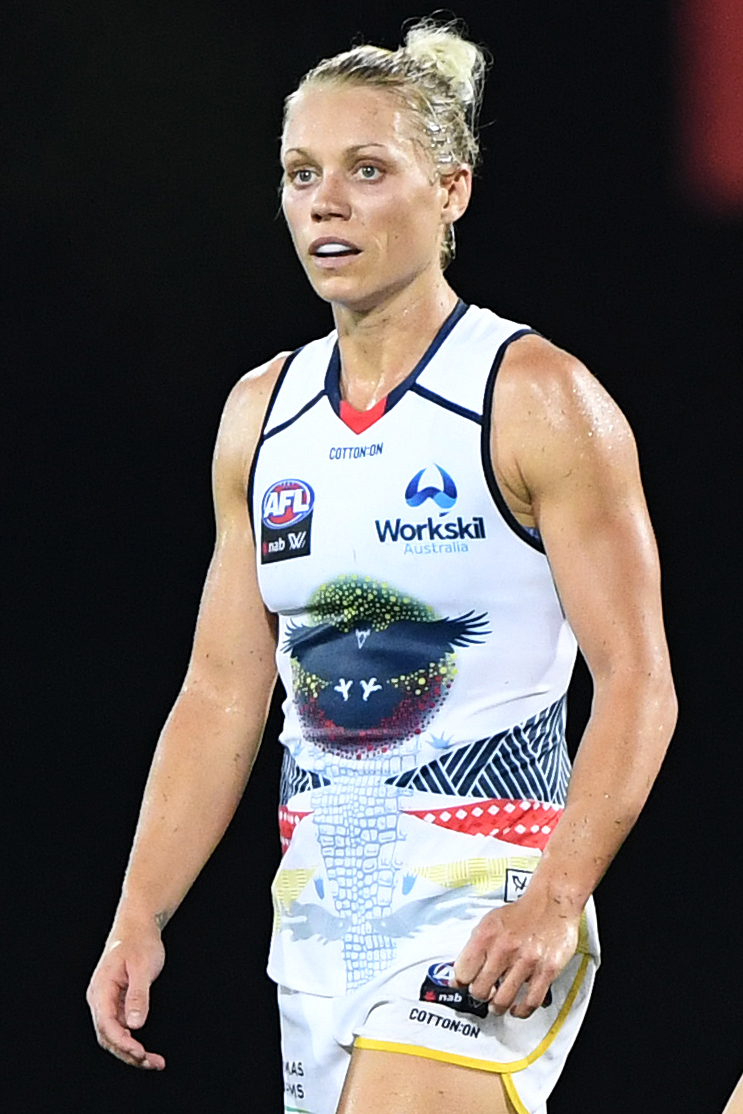
- Phillips playing Australian rules football for Adelaide in 2019
- Born: Erin Victoria Phillips; 19 May 1985 (age 41); Melbourne, Victoria, Australia
- Occupations: Dual-sport athlete in basketball and Australian rules football, WNBA assistant coach
- Known for: 2× WNBA champion (2012, 2014) FIBA World Championship gold medallist (2006) 3× AFLW premiership player (2017, 2019, 2022 (S6)) 2× AFLW league best and fairest (2017, 2019)
- Spouse: Tracy Gahan (m. 2014)

Erin Victoria Phillips OAM (born 19 May 1985) is an Australian basketball player and former Australian rules football player. She played nine seasons in the Women's National Basketball Association (WNBA) for five different teams and is a two-time WNBA champion. She also represented Australia on the women's national basketball team, winning a gold medal at the 2006 FIBA World Championship for Women and serving as a co-vice captain at the 2016 Summer Olympics. She also played for the Adelaide and Port Adelaide Football Clubs in the AFL Women's (AFLW) competition, retiring in 2023. She is a three-time premiership player and two-time league best and fairest. She was inducted into the Australian Football Hall of Fame on 10 June 2025.

Phillips's father Greg played professional Australian rules football for Port Adelaide, where he was an eight-time premiership player and earned an induction into the Australian Football Hall of Fame. Phillips played only Australian rules football until age 13, switching to basketball because of the lack of professional opportunities for female footballers at the time. She made her debut in the Women's National Basketball League (WNBL) for the Adelaide Lightning, her hometown team, at the age of 17 and was named to the All-WNBL Team three times by the age of 22, finally winning a WNBL championship in 2008 in her last year with the team. Phillips was drafted into the WNBA in 2005 by the Connecticut Sun. With the Indiana Fever, she established herself as a starter and won her first WNBA title in 2012. She won another WNBA title two years later with the Phoenix Mercury. During her basketball career, Phillips played both point guard and shooting guard, excelling at three-pointers and employing a physical style of play. Following her retirement from the WNBA, she was also an assistant coach for the Dallas Wings, the last team she played for in the league. In 2025, she returns to basketball in the NBL1 Central with the Woodville Warriors.

With the launch of the AFLW in 2017, Phillips began her football career at age 31 as a co-captain of Adelaide. Despite not having played competitive football in nearly 18 years, she quickly emerged as the league's best player and one of its biggest stars. She won the AFLW best and fairest award by a wide margin in both 2017 and 2019, as well as the AFLW Grand Final best on ground as a member of Adelaide's premiership teams in both years. Phillips played as a midfielder and was also one of the leading goal scorers in the competition.

== Early life and education ==
Erin Victoria Phillips was born on 19 May 1985 in the Melbourne suburb of Carlton to Julie and Greg Phillips, during the time her professional footballer father was playing for Collingwood Football Club in the Victorian Football League (VFL; later renamed Australian Football League, or AFL). Her middle name relates to the state of Victoria.

The family moved back to Adelaide and Phillips grew up with her two older sisters Rachel and Amy there. Her father played most of his career with the Port Adelaide Football Club in the South Australian National Football League (SANFL), where he served as captain for three years, and was inducted into the Australian Football Hall of Fame in 2020. Phillips has said she wanted to be an AFL footballer just like her dad since she was a young child, and her father noticed that she was a gifted athlete from a young age.

Phillips attended Seaton High School, in the western Adelaide suburb of Seaton, during the time her father was at Port Adelaide FC. The whole family would attend every game, including her grandparents and aunts.

Phillips began competing in football with the SMOSH West Lakes Football Club (then known as the St. Michael's Old Scholars and Hindmarsh Football Club) under-9 side, where she was the only girl on the team. Her under-11 team won the grand final. She was also named the best and fairest player on her under-13 team. John Cahill, one of her father's coaches at Port Adelaide, praised Phillips's ability, saying she was "as good a 14-year old as I've ever seen play football", and Phillips had the opportunity to train with Port Adelaide on occasion while growing up.

Phillips began playing basketball at the age of 13. She decided to switch her sporting focus from football to basketball at the age of 14 due to the lack of opportunities at the time for female footballers to play professionally. Her father had also introduced her to Rachael Sporn, a member of the Australian national basketball team, around this time. As a junior, Phillips played for the West Adelaide Bearcats. She represented South Australia Metro in the under-16 and under-18 Australian national championships, winning the Norma Connolly Trophy as a member of the under-16 championship team in 1999. Phillips was also a member of the South Australia under-20 championship team in 2004, where she won the Bob Staunton Award as the most outstanding player in the women's tournament.

== Basketball career ==
Erin Phillips
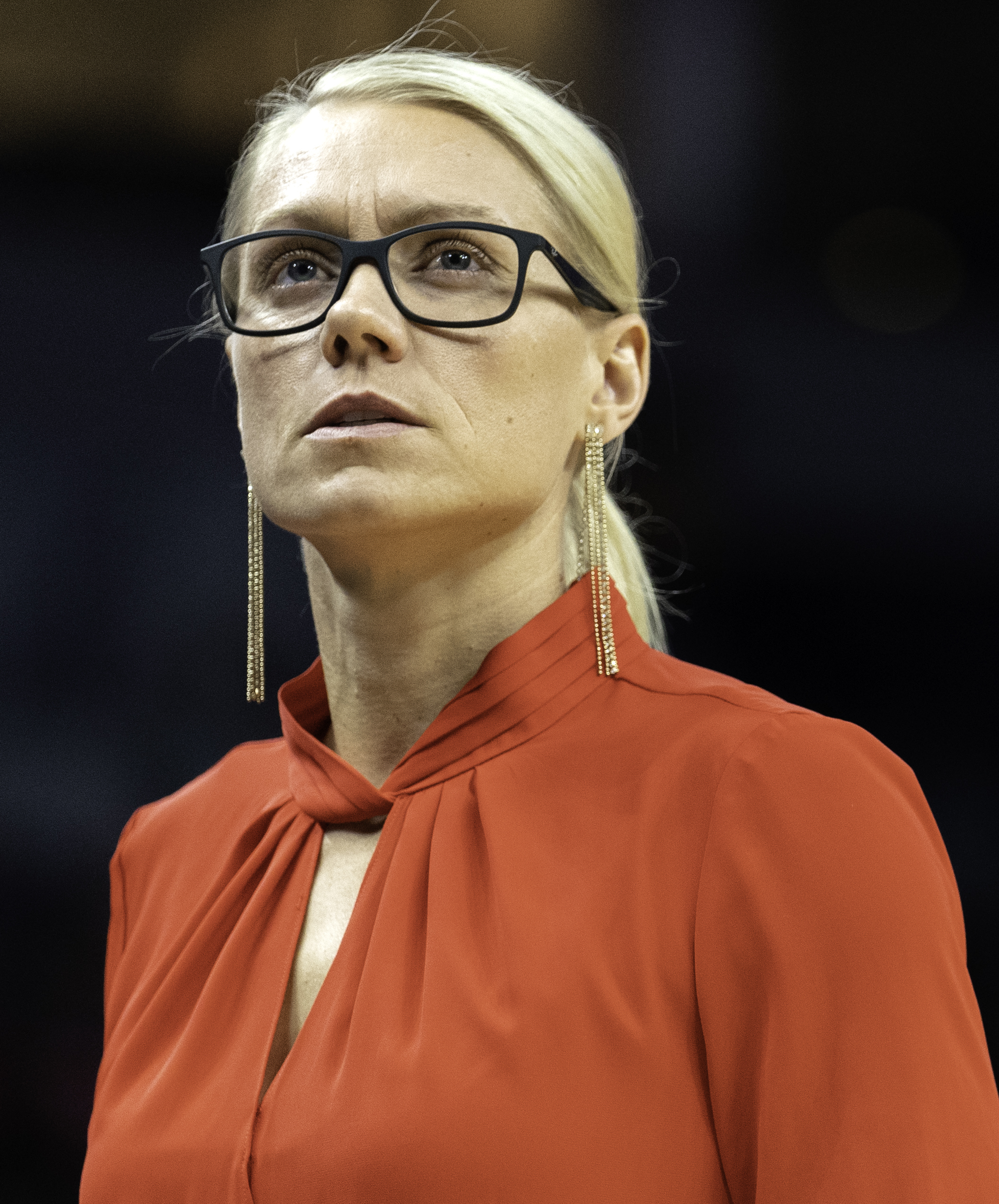
- Phillips coaching for the Dallas Wings in 2019

No. 13 – Woodville Warriors
- Position: Point guard / shooting guard
- League: NBL1 Central

Personal information
- Listed height: 5 ft 8 in (1.73 m)
- Listed weight: 165 lb (75 kg)

Career information
- WNBA draft: 2005: 2nd round, 21st overall pick
- Drafted by: Connecticut Sun
- Playing career: 2002–2016; 2025–
- Coaching career: 2018–2019

Career history

Playing
- 2002–2008: Adelaide Lightning
- 2006–2009: Connecticut Sun
- 2008–2009: Electra Ramat Hasharon
- 2009–2010: Lotos Gdynia
- 2010–2014: Wisła Can-Pack Kraków
- 2011–2013: Indiana Fever
- 2014: Phoenix Mercury
- 2014–2015: Good Angels Košice
- 2015: Los Angeles Sparks
- 2016: Dallas Wings
- 2025–: Woodville Warriors

Coaching
- 2018–2019: Dallas Wings (assistant)

Career highlights
- 2× WNBA champion (2012, 2014); WNBL champion (2008); 3× WNBL All-Star Five (2005, 2006, 2007); 2× WNBL leader in assists per game (2006, 2007); EuroLeague All-Star (2010); 3× Polska PLKK champion (2010, 2011, 2012); 2× Polska PLKK All-Star (2011, 2012); NBL1 Central champion (2025)
- Stats at WNBA.com
- Stats at Basketball Reference
Medals
Women's basketball
Representing Australia
Olympic Games
| Silver medal – second place | 2008 Beijing | Team |
World Championship
| Gold medal – first place | 2006 Brazil |
| Bronze medal – third place | 2014 Turkey |
Commonwealth Games
| Gold medal – first place | 2006 Melbourne | Team competition |

=== WNBL ===
==== Adelaide Lightning (2002–08): Three All-WNBL Teams, WNBL champion ====
Phillips made her professional basketball debut with the Adelaide Lightning in the Women's National Basketball League (WNBL) in 2002 at age 17. She played six consecutive seasons with the team through 2008. Adelaide made the finals in all six of those years. Phillips had earned an Australian Institute of Sport scholarship to join their WNBL team in 2003, but never played for them after being replaced before the start of that season. Phillips emerged as a breakout star in her third year and was named to the All-WNBL Team (then known as the WNBL All-Star Five) at the end of the 2004–05 season. Averaging 15.0 points, 8.6 rebounds, and 5.3 assists per game that season, she was second in the league in assists behind only her teammate Jennifer Screen who had 5.9 per game. Phillips was also fourth in the league in offensive rebounds with 3.1 per game and fifth in steals with 5.1 per game. Adelaide finished fourth on the ladder and lost their semifinal to the Sydney Uni Flames 94–93 in overtime. Before the game, the Adelaide team had been involved in a car accident that injured some of the players and delayed the start of the game. Phillips had 40 points in the loss. This was the third consecutive year that Sydney eliminated Adelaide in the finals.

Phillips continued to be one of the best players in the league through the remainder of her WNBL career. She was named to the All-WNBL Team again in 2006 and 2007. During the 2005–06 season, she averaged 15.7 points, 7.5 rebounds, and a league-leading 4.9 assists per game. She was also fifth in free throw percentage at 80.0%. Adelaide finished in a three-way tie for first with a 14–7 record and entered the finals in the second position based on the tiebreak criteria. They lost both of their finals, which were against the Dandenong Rangers and the Canberra Capitals, the two other teams with the same record as them. The second loss to Canberra, who were led by Lauren Jackson, in the preliminary final again came in overtime and was highlighted by Phillips scoring 23 points. Phillips's 2006–07 season ended early after 17 games when she tore the anterior cruciate ligament (ACL) in her right knee during a collision with Canberra player Tully Bevilaqua. She finished the season with a career-high 16.5 points per game to go along with 7.2 rebounds and 4.9 assists per game. This was the second consecutive season she led the league in assists per game. For the second year in a row, Adelaide lost to Canberra in the preliminary final.

The 2007–08 season was Phillips's last that she played in the WNBL. She was not ready to return from her ACL injury at the start of the year and ended up playing only 17 out of 24 games during the regular season. Although Phillips did not make the All-WNBL Team, her teammates Tracy Gahan and Jessica Foley were named to the team as they led Adelaide to a 21–3 record, earning them the minor premiership. Phillips had slight drops in her averages, finishing the year with 14.6 points, 5.4 rebounds, and 3.3 assists per game. After Adelaide lost the semifinal to Sydney Uni, they defeated Dandenong to set up a rematch with Sydney Uni in the WNBL Grand Final. Adelaide won the grand final 92–82 for Phillips's first and only WNBL championship. Phillips scored 16 points in the game, second on her team behind Renae Camino who had 32 and was named Grand Final MVP.

Seven years later, Phillips planned to return to the WNBL for the 2015–16 season. After originally wanting to return to the Adelaide Lightning, she became the first player to sign with the South East Queensland Stars, a new WNBL franchise. However, Phillips never played for the team due to injury and the franchise dissolved at the end of their first season due to financial difficulties. Phillips ranks in the top ten all-time for the Adelaide Lightning in points, assists, rebounds, and steals as of 2019. She is tenth in points with 1498, sixth in assists with 423, seventh in rebounds with 731, and ninth in steals with 139.

=== WNBA ===
==== Connecticut Sun (2006–09): Debut at 21 years old ====
The Connecticut Sun of the Women's National Basketball Association (WNBA) selected Phillips in the second round of the 2005 WNBA draft with the 21st overall pick. She was the only player taken in the draft who did not play college basketball in the United States and one of two international players drafted along with fifth overall pick Sancho Lyttle. She did not play during the 2005 WNBA season, instead choosing to play on tours and in training camps with the national team in Australia to increase her chances of making the team.

Phillips decided to join the Sun for the 2006 season despite national team coach Jan Stirling's saying it would hurt her chances of playing in the FIBA World Championship later that year, which was scheduled to begin just a week after the end of the WNBA Finals. Phillips played in all 34 games in her debut season. She was named a starter in the 22nd game of the season after an injury to Nykesha Sales and ended up starting the last 13 games. The Sun won their first eleven games with Phillips as a starter as part of a franchise-record twelve-game win streak. She recorded a season-high six assists in her first game as a starter, and then had season-bests of 19 points and 6 rebounds a few games later. Overall, Phillips averaged 5.4 points and 2.5 assists per game. She was also ninth in the league in free throw shooting percentage at 88.0%. Led by their top scorer Katie Douglas and point guard Lindsay Whalen, the Sun finished the regular season with the best record in the WNBA at 26–8. With Sales back from injury, Phillips returned to the bench for the playoffs, where the Sun swept the Washington Mystics 2–0 in the Eastern Conference Semifinals. However, they were eliminated in the Eastern Conference Finals 2–1 by the Detroit Shock, the eventual champions. Phillips's only start in the playoffs came in the first game of that series, a loss on the road.

Phillips missed the entire 2007 season while recovering from an ACL injury suffered during the offseason while playing in the WNBL in Australia. She did not return to the WNBA until the second half of the 2008 season after missing the first half of the season to train with the Australian national team for the Olympics, which took place in August in the middle of the WNBA season. Phillips played in eight regular season games, all off the bench. In the last game of the season, she scored 18 points and recorded a career-high eight rebounds. Overall, she shot a career-high field goal percentage of 46.4%. Although the Sun finished second in the Eastern Conference, they were eliminated in the Eastern Conference Semifinals by the third-place New York Liberty, losing the decisive third game of the series at home by four points.

Phillips began the 2009 season as a starter. After starting the first 18 games of the season, Phillips and Amber Holt lost their starting roles to bench players and fellow guards Anete Jēkabsone-Žogota and Tan White. As a starter, she averaged 9.3 points, 3.2 rebounds, and 1.9 assists per game. She finished the season with a low three-point field goal percentage of 29.3%, shooting just 20.9% off the bench. The Sun did not make the playoffs that season due to the tiebreak criteria, despite finishing tied for fourth with the Mystics and Chicago Sky. The Sun attempted to trade Phillips before the start of the 2010 season. She was at risk of losing playing time after the team signed experienced guards Renee Montgomery and Kara Lawson to complement Jēkabsone-Žogota and White. They were unable to find a trade and did not sign her to the team roster. Phillips ultimately did not play the 2010 WNBA season.

==== Indiana Fever (2011–13): First WNBA title ====
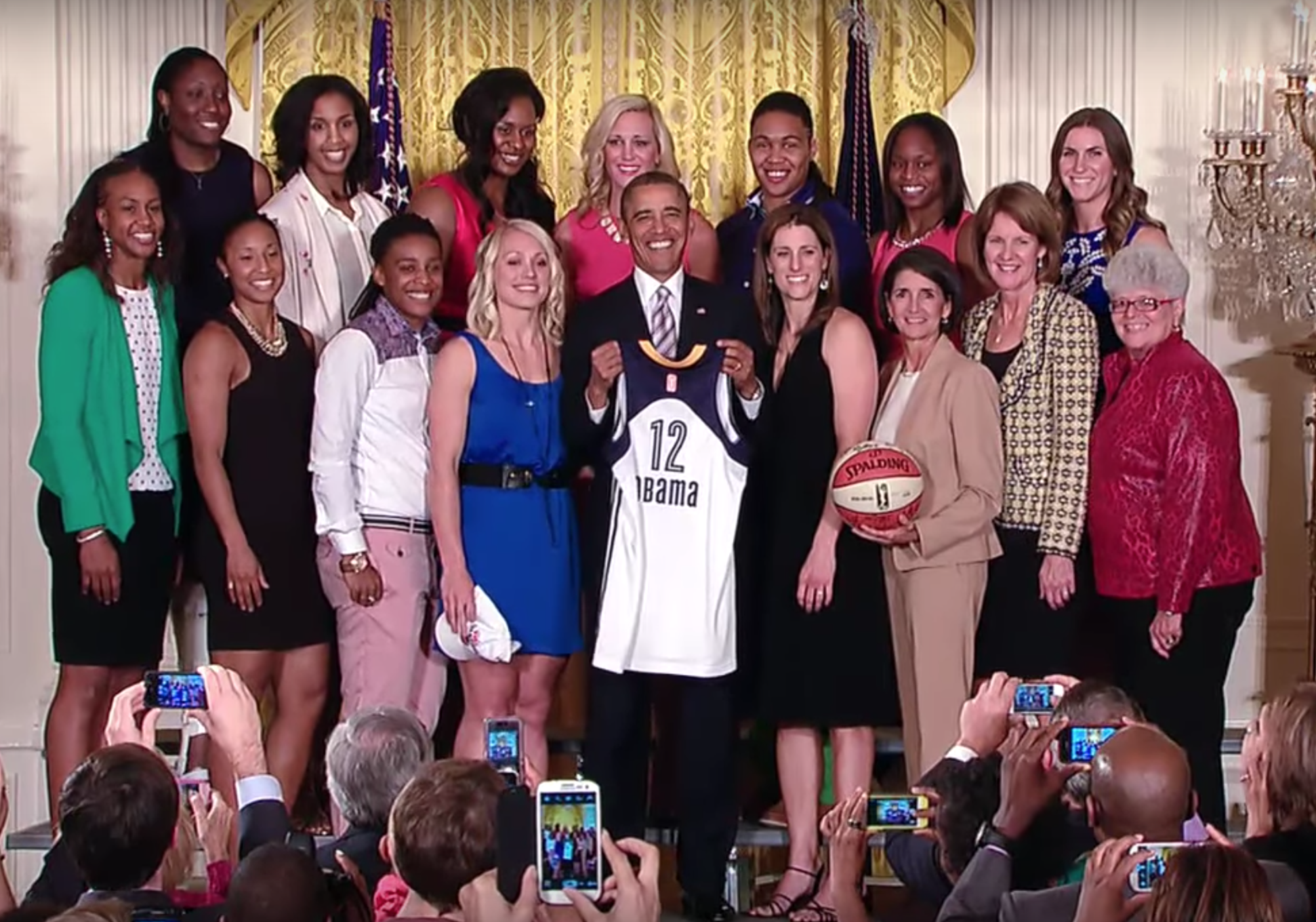
Phillips (to the left of Barack Obama) with the 2012 WNBA champion Indiana Fever at the White House

Before the start of the 2011 WNBA season, Phillips and fellow Australian Belinda Snell signed with the Seattle Storm. Less than three months later, however, Phillips was traded to the Indiana Fever in April as part of a three-team deal that sent Katie Smith to the Storm from the Mystics, a trade Smith had requested. The Fever were led by team veteran forward Tamika Catchings as well as Phillips's former Sun teammate Katie Douglas. After beginning the season coming off the bench, Phillips won a starting role following a season-ending injury to point guard Briann January ten games into the season. She started a career-best 22 games that year, and averaged a career-best 8.6 points per game to go along with 2.8 rebounds and 2.4 assists per game. Phillips was also eighth in the league in three-point field goal percentage, shooting 42.6%. She scored a career-high 21 points on two separate occasions, both losses to the Atlanta Dream. The Fever entered the playoffs as the top seed in the Eastern Conference. They defeated the New York Liberty 2–1 in the Conference Semifinals before losing to the Atlanta Dream 2–1 in the Conference Finals. Phillips's best playoff game was the winner-take-all Game 3 of the Conference Semifinals in which she scored 12 points and recorded five steals in the Fever's 10-point victory.

"I thought Erin Phillips had one hell of a series. You've got to have somebody other than your star player stepping up. Phillips was consistently a player that made plays, and that's what the Finals are about."

— WNBA Finals opposing coach Cheryl Reeve praising Phillips's performance in the series following the injury to Katie Douglas

After beginning the 2012 season as a starter, Phillips was moved to the bench after five games, but ended up receiving more playing time coming off the bench. She also started the last three games of the season with January and Shavonte Zellous both missing a week due to concussion-like symptoms. The final two games were two of Phillips's best of the season, as she scored 19 and 21 points. Although both players returned for the playoffs for the second-seeded Fever, Phillips started every game in the playoffs except for the first. She saw an increased role on the team after an ankle injury kept Katie Douglas out of the rest of the playoffs following Game 2 of the Conference Finals. The Fever defeated the Dream in the Conference Semifinals and then Phillips's former team, the Sun, in the Conference Finals, both in three games. In the WNBA Finals, the Fever defeated the defending champion Minnesota Lynx 3–1 for the WNBA title. Phillips scored at least 10 points in all five games Douglas missed, including 15 points in the winner-take-all game of the Conference Semifinals and 18 points and 8 rebounds in the series-clinching Game 4 of the WNBA Finals. Overall in the WNBA Finals, she averaged 13.5 points in 35 minutes per game while compiling a 46.7% three-point field goal percentage. Winning the WNBA title vindicated Phillips, who was left off the 2012 Australian Olympic team roster for choosing to play the entire WNBA season instead of sitting out the first half like some of her compatriots in the league. She also finished the regular season third in the league in three-point field goal percentage, shooting 43.8%.

Just before the start of the 2013 season in late May, Phillips tore her meniscus in her right knee, an injury that kept her out until early July. She ended up playing only 18 games, starting just six of them. Phillips made a career-high five three-pointers in her first start of the year in mid-August. She finished the season second in the WNBA in three-point field goal percentage, shooting 47.9%. Despite having a losing record, the Fever made the playoffs and swept the top-seeded Chicago Sky in the Conference Semifinals. Their season came to an end when they were swept by the Atlanta Dream in the Conference Finals.

==== One-year stints (2014–16): Second WNBA title ====
Two months before the start of the 2014 season, Phillips was traded to the Phoenix Mercury with a second-round draft pick in return for forward Lynetta Kizer and a first-round draft pick. She joined two of her compatriots on the team, fellow guard Penny Taylor and new coach Sandy Brondello. Led by a five-time WNBA scoring champion in Diana Taurasi and a perennial league leader in blocks in Brittney Griner, the Mercury finished the season with the best record in the WNBA at 29–5, leading the league in both offensive and defensive rating. Phillips missed only one game during the season. After beginning the year as a starter for the first nine games, she lost her starting role to Taylor. She started only one more game the rest of the season, matching her career-high with 21 points. Phillips led the WNBA in three-point field goal percentage, shooting 44.9%. The Mercury dominated the playoffs, defeating the Los Angeles Sparks, the Minnesota Lynx, and the Chicago Sky to win the WNBA title. The only game they lost in the playoffs was Game 2 of the Conference Finals to the defending champion Lynx. Six of the team's eight playoff wins were by at least 14 points. Phillips's best games in the playoffs were the Game 2 loss in the Conference Finals in which she had 10 points and 4 assists, and Game 2 of the WNBA Finals in which she had 7 points and 3 assists.

Phillips signed with the Los Angeles Sparks in the offseason. She played only 12 games during the 2015 season due to knee issues both early and late in the season. She finished the year with a career-low 26.7% three-point field goal percentage. Phillips missed the playoffs, where the fourth-seeded Sparks were eliminated in the first round by the Minnesota Lynx. During the offseason, Phillips was traded to the Dallas Wings for Riquna Williams and the sixth overall pick in the 2016 WNBA draft. She was named a co-captain of the new team, which had just relocated and was known as the Tulsa Shock in previous years. Phillips also ended up scoring the first points in Dallas Wings' history. She began the season as a starter before settling into a bench role for much of the rest of the season, averaging only 14.6 minutes per game, the second-lowest of her WNBA career. The Wings finished the season with an 11–23 record and did not make the playoffs. A week before the start of the 2017 season, the Wings waived Phillips. She retired from the WNBA several days later.

==== WNBA statistics ====
Legend
| GP | Games played | GS | Games started | MPG | Minutes per game | RPG | Rebounds per game |
| APG | Assists per game | SPG | Steals per game | BPG | Blocks per game | PPG | Points per game |
| TO | Turnovers per game | FG% | Field-goal percentage | 3P% | 3-point field-goal percentage | FT% | Free-throw percentage |
| **Bold** | Career best | ° | League leader |

| † | Denotes seasons in which Phillips won a WNBA championship |

Regular season

| Year | Team | GP | GS | MPG | FG% | 3P% | FT% | RPG | APG | SPG | BPG | PPG |
|---|---|---|---|---|---|---|---|---|---|---|---|---|
| 2006 | Connecticut | **34** | 13 | 18.1 | .393 | .343 | .880 | 2.1 | 2.4 | .9 | .1 | 5.4 |
| 2008 | Connecticut | 8 | 0 | 10.8 | .464 | .500 | .818 | 2.1 | .4 | .5 | .1 | 5.1 |
| 2009 | Connecticut | 32 | 18 | 23.1 | .382 | .293 | .813 | **3.2** | 2.1 | **1.3** | .1 | 8.1 |
| 2011 | Indiana | 31 | **22** | 22.2 | **.462** | .426 | .833 | 2.8 | 2.4 | 1.0 | .0 | **8.6** |
| 2012^{†} | Indiana | 29 | 8 | 21.4 | .390 | .438 | .862 | 2.8 | 2.2 | .8 | .1 | 6.1 |
| 2013 | Indiana | 18 | 6 | 21.3 | .367 | **.479** | .750 | 1.1 | 1.6 | .8 | .1 | 5.9 |
| 2014^{†} | Phoenix | 33 | 10 | 18.7 | .435 | .449° | .844 | 1.6 | 2.2 | .7 | .0 | 5.8 |
| 2015 | Los Angeles | 12 | 12 | **30.9** | .286 | .267 | .850 | 3.0 | **3.1** | .9 | **.2** | 6.8 |
| 2016 | Dallas | 32 | 12 | 14.6 | .438 | .383 | **.906** | 1.2 | 1.2 | .2 | .1 | 4.7 |
| Career | 9 years, 5 teams | 229 | 101 | 20.0 | .403 | .381 | .844 | 2.2 | 2.0 | .8 | .1 | 6.3 |

Playoffs

| Year | Team | GP | GS | MPG | FG% | 3P% | FT% | RPG | APG | SPG | BPG | PPG |
|---|---|---|---|---|---|---|---|---|---|---|---|---|
| 2006 | Connecticut | 5 | 1 | 20.2 | .455 | **.538** | .750 | 1.4 | 1.4 | .8 | .2 | 6.6 |
| 2008 | Connecticut | 3 | 0 | 12.0 | .273 | .500 | – | 2.1 | .7 | .0 | **.3** | 3.0 |
| 2011 | Indiana | 6 | 6 | 26.7 | .375 | .000 | .818 | 2.3 | **3.0** | **1.5** | .2 | 6.5 |
| 2012^{†} | Indiana | **10** | **9** | **30.1** | **.475** | .517 | .714 | 2.2 | 1.6 | .6 | .1 | **10.1** |
| 2013 | Indiana | 4 | 0 | 21.8 | .438 | .400 | **1.000** | 1.3 | 1.3 | .8 | .0 | 5.5 |
| 2014^{†} | Phoenix | 8 | 0 | 15.3 | .323 | .231 | **1.000** | **2.5** | 2.4 | .9 | .1 | 3.5 |
| Career | 6 years, 3 teams | 36 | 16 | 22.4 | .415 | .405 | .810 | 1.9 | 1.9 | .8 | .1 | 6.4 |

=== Other professional leagues ===
==== Israeli Ligat ha'Al (2008–09) ====
Phillips joined Ramat Hasharon in the Israeli Ligat ha'Al following the end of the 2008 WNBA season. This was the first year she did not return to the WNBL in Australia during the offseason. Phillips played only the first half of the season for Ramat Hasharon, averaging 11.6 points, 5.3 assists, and 2.8 rebounds per game in 10 regular season games. In the middle of the season, she injured her right knee during the second quarter of the Israeli Cup final in late December. Although she did not require surgery, Phillips returned to Australia for physical therapy and did not play another game with the team. Ramat Hasharon lost the Israeli Cup final.

==== Polish PLKK (2009–14): Three-time champion ====
Phillips began playing in the Polska Liga Koszykówki Kobiet (PLKK) in the 2009–10 WNBA offseason following her last year with the Connecticut Sun. She joined Lotos Gdynia in her first PLKK season, playing nearly the entire year. In 30 games, she averaged 10.9 points, 5.3 rebounds, and 4.3 assists per game, with a three-point field goal percentage of 44.1%. The team won the league championship after finishing second in the regular season. Gdynia also competed in EuroLeague Women, where Phillips was named an All-Star for the Rest of the World team against Europe.

The following offseason, Phillips signed with Wisła Can-Pack Kraków, where she played for the next four seasons. In her first two seasons, she won both the regular season and the league championships. In EuroLeague Women, they were eliminated in the quarterfinals during the 2010–11 season and finished in eighth place during the 2011–12 season. Phillips led the team in scoring in the EuroLeague during her first season in Kraków with 14.9 points per game. She was also named a PLKK All-Star in her first two seasons with Kraków.

==== Slovak Extraliga (2014–15) ====
Phillips moved to the Slovak Women's Basketball Extraliga for the 2014–15 season, playing for perennial league champions Good Angels Košice. The team won the league title as part of their stretch of 15 consecutive titles from 2004 through 2018. Phillips played seven games in both the Extraliga and the EuroLeague, averaging 7.4 points, 3.4 rebounds, and 3.4 assists per game in the Extraliga, as well as 10.4 points, 3.3 rebounds, and 3.3 assists per game during the EuroLeague season.

==== Woodville Warriors (2025) ====
In August 2024, Phillips signed with the Woodville Warriors of the NBL1 Central for the 2025 season. She made her return to the court in March 2025. She helped the Warriors reach the NBL1 Central Grand Final, where they defeated the Sturt Sabres 73–65 to win the championship. Phillips contributed seven points, five rebounds and four assists in what was her final game.

=== National team ===
==== 2005–06: Commonwealth and World Championship gold medals ====
Phillips began training with the Australian women's national basketball team, the Opals, in 2005. She chose to participate in training camps and tours with the national team instead of joining the Connecticut Sun in the WNBA, who had drafted her in May of that year. She played several exhibition tournaments in China in July, and then helped the Opals qualify for the following year's World Championships in August with their victory in the Oceania Qualifying Series against the hosts New Zealand in August. Phillips's first major senior international tournament was the Commonwealth Games in March 2006, which were hosted by Melbourne and were including basketball for the first time. At home in Australia, the Opals won the gold medal in the women's basketball event, defeating New Zealand in the final by a lopsided margin. Phillips played an important role in the semifinal win against England. The following month, the national team hosted the Opals World Challenge in Canberra, where they defeated the United States women's national basketball team, who had not lost a game in seven years, for the first time since 1998.

After the World Challenge event, Phillips decided to forgo training with the Opals that summer to begin her WNBA career. National team coach Jan Stirling was against her decision, saying, "Erin has made a call which will obviously adversely affect her chances for a world championship berth." Nonetheless, Stirling ended up naming Phillips to the national team for the FIBA World Championship for Women in Brazil that September after praising her performance in her first WNBA season. Stirling commented, "Erin's been ... playing very, very well. She is definitely a young developing player we've got earmarked for Beijing and to get a worlds under her belt is a bonus when you move the clock forward to [the Olympics]." Australia went undefeated and won the gold medal at the World Championship, their first gold medal at any major international competition. They defeated the hosts Brazil in the semifinals and then Russia in the final after Russia had upset the United States in the semifinals. Phillips had a minor role on the team during the tournament, averaging 2.0 points and 1.1 assists in 7.4 minutes per game.

==== 2008–10: Olympic silver medal in Beijing ====
Despite being unable to play for the Opals in 2007 due to an ACL injury, Phillips was assured a place on the national team in their preparation for the 2008 Summer Olympics in Beijing. She returned to play with the national team in April 2008 and missed the first half of the WNBA season to continue training with them up until and through the Olympics in August. In addition to exhibitions against New Zealand, Russia, and Chinese Taipei, Phillips was with the team for the Good Luck Beijing event, a warm-up tournament to help Beijing prepare their operations. Without their full team, Australia won only two out of six games. The Opals regrouped for the Olympics. They swept their round robin group, winning all five of those games by more than 15 points. They then won both their quarterfinal game against the Czech Republic and their semifinal game against China by more than 30 points. Nonetheless, Australia finished as silver medallists after losing the gold medal match to the United States 92–65 in a lopsided game, their third consecutive runner-up finish to the United States at the Olympics.

After the Connecticut Sun could not trade Phillips for the 2010 WNBA season, she instead trained with the national team, winning exhibition tournaments in Hungary during July and in Spain during September. The 2010 international season culminated with the FIBA World Championship for Women in the Czech Republic. Although Australia's only round robin loss was to the United States, they were defeated in the quarterfinals by the Czech Republic, the tournament hosts. Australia finished in fifth place after winning the 5th-to-8th-place consolation bracket. Phillips had more playing time in the tournament than in the previous World Championship, averaging 4.1 points, 2.7 rebounds, and 1.3 assists in 13.6 minutes per game.

==== 2012–16: Olympic absence and return, World Championship bronze ====
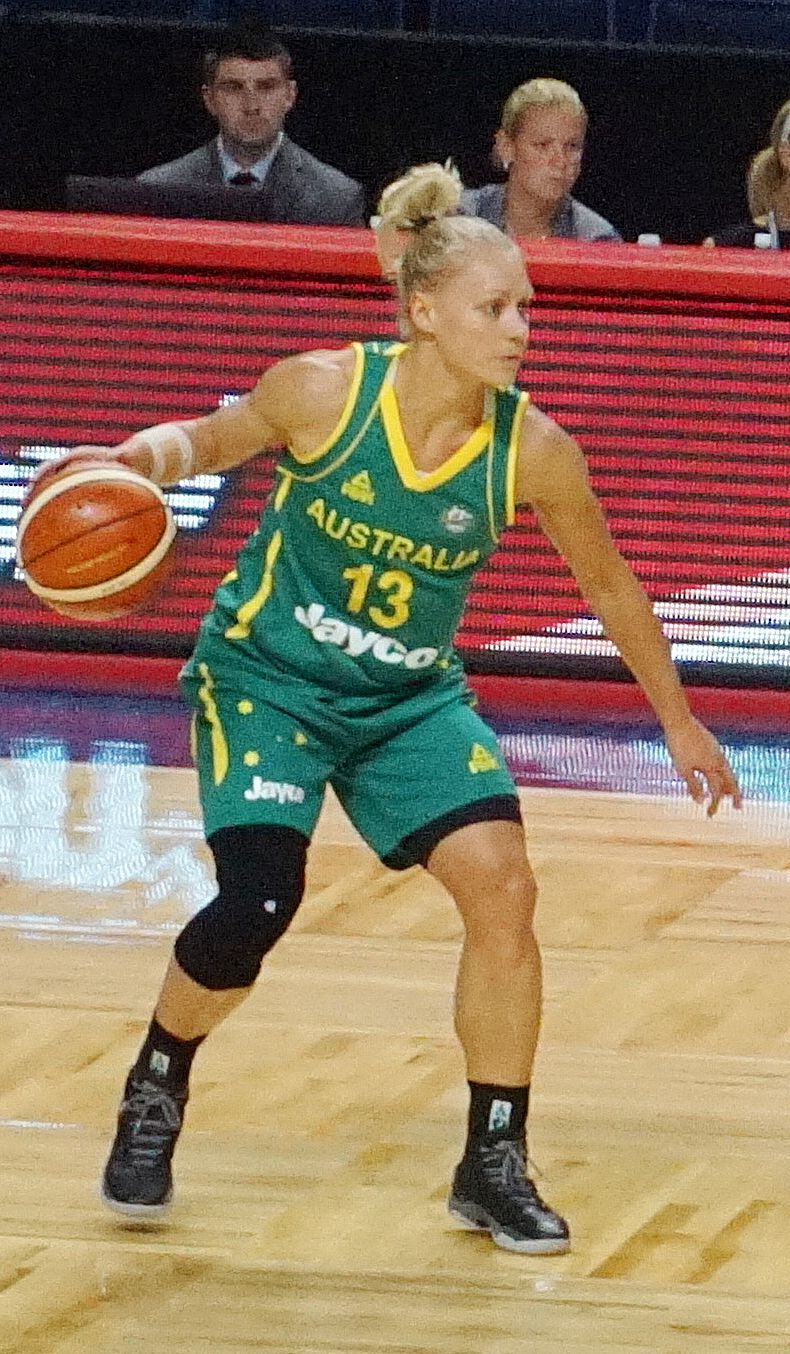
Phillips playing for the Australian national team in 2016

Although Phillips participated in training camps with the national team in preparation for the 2012 Summer Olympics in London, she was not named to the team. The Australian press and the WNBA regarded her omission as a surprise. Nonetheless, Phillips knew she was hurting her chances of making the team by playing the full WNBA season instead of skipping the first half of the year to keep training with the Opals like Lauren Jackson. She decided to play the full season because she thought it was better preparation and she wanted to honour her contract with the Indiana Fever. The Opals won the bronze medal in London, and Phillips ended up winning her first WNBA title.

Phillips returned to the national team as one of 33 players selected to prepare for the 2014 FIBA World Championship for Women in Turkey. She was named to the team for the World Championship, having won the WNBA Finals just 15 days before the Opals' first game in the tournament. Australia swept their round robin group and won their quarterfinal game against Canada. After a 12-point semifinal loss to the United States, the Opals defeated the hosts Turkey for the bronze medal. Unlike her previous two World Championships where she had little playing time off the bench, Phillips established herself in the team's regular starting lineup, leading the team in minutes per game, and was third in scoring and second in assists. Overall, she averaged 8.7 points, 4.0 assists, and 4.0 rebounds in 26.2 minutes per game. In the loss against the United States, she led the team in scoring with a game-high 19 points and made her only three three-pointers of the tournament on six such shots.

The last major international tournament of Phillips's career was the 2016 Summer Olympics in Rio de Janeiro. Phillips and Laura Hodges were voted co-vice captains by their teammates, while Penny Taylor was voted captain. Despite sweeping their round robin group, Australia were upset in the quarterfinals 73–71 by Serbia in a game where the Opals had 26 turnovers. Phillips had 10 points and 4 assists in the loss. Overall, she averaged 4.7 points, 3.2 assists, and 2.0 rebounds in 23.5 minutes per game while playing as a starter. The loss to Serbia ended the Opals' streak of five consecutive Olympics with a medal. Phillips officially retired from competitive basketball in January 2018.

=== Playing style ===
Phillips was a guard, and could play both the point guard and shooting guard positions. Her versatility allowed her to play as a combo guard between both of those positions. Phillips's first WNBA coach Mike Thibault compared her to Women's Basketball Hall of Famer Michele Timms, another Australian point guard. He also said she was "one of the best rebounding guards we've had". With her background in the much more physical sport of Australian rules football, Phillips had a physical style of play in basketball as well. Thibault commended her ability to take contact while driving to the basket, comparing her to then-teammate Lindsay Whalen in that regard. Phillips also excelled at taking offensive charges while on defence and was a good perimeter defender.

Phillips was one of the best three-point shooters in the WNBA during her career, ranking top ten in the league in three-point field goal percentage five times in the eight seasons where she played enough to qualify for the rankings. Her best rankings in three-point field goal percentage came in three consecutive years when she finished third in 2012, second in 2013, and first in 2014. Although she did not lead the league in 2013, her 47.9% three-point field goal percentage that year ranks 13th overall in WNBA history as of 2020. Phillips's career three-point field goal percentage of 38.1% ranks 34th all-time as of 2020. Phillips was also an excellent free-throw shooter. Her 84.4% career free throw percentage ranks 33rd all-time in the WNBA as of 2020.

=== Coaching ===
Following her release by the Dallas Wings and retirement from the WNBA immediately before the start of the 2017 WNBA season, Phillips was named the Wings' director of player and franchise development a week later. Shortly after the end of the season, Phillips was promoted to assistant coach of the team for 2018, replacing Bridget Pettis. She coached alongside fellow assistant coach Taj McWilliams-Franklin and under head coach Fred Williams, who had been the team's head coach in Phillips's last year as a player in the WNBA as well. She retained her position the following year as the Wings hired new head coach Brian Agler. She had turned down the opportunity to interview for that head coaching vacancy in order to return to Australian rules football in the AFLW during the offseason. Phillips left the coaching staff following the 2019 WNBA season in search of opportunities in Australia.

== Australian rules football career ==
Erin Phillips
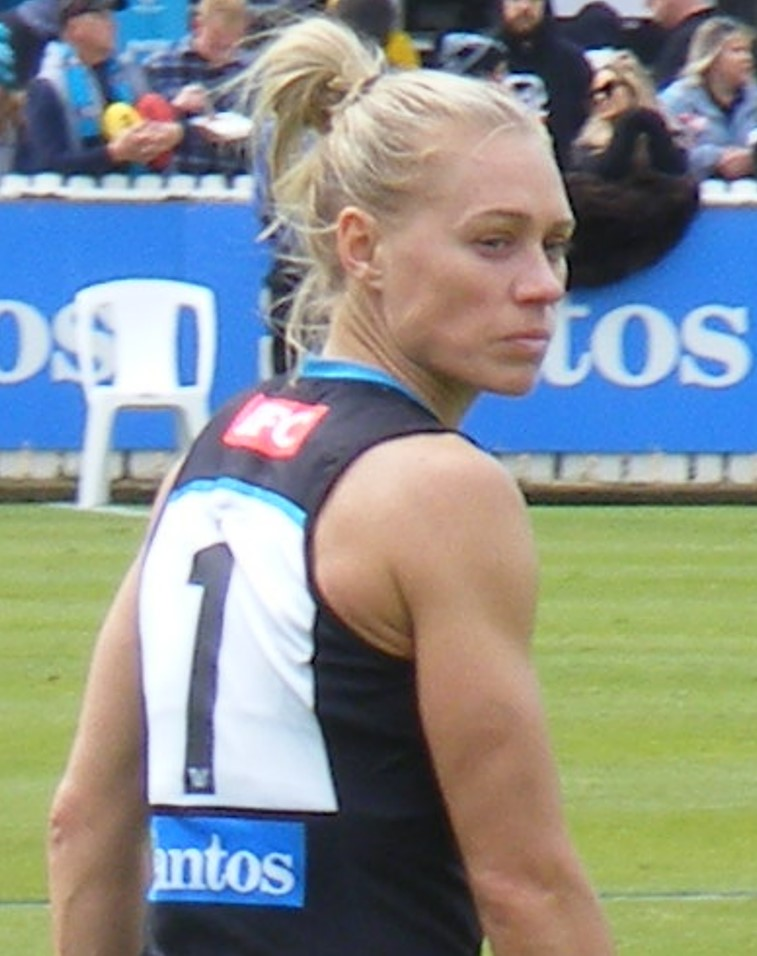
- Phillips playing for Port Adelaide in 2022

Personal information
- Draft: Rookie signing 2016: Adelaide
- Debut: Round 1, 2017, Adelaide vs. Greater Western Sydney, at Thebarton Oval
- Position: Midfielder

Playing career^{1}
| Years | Club | Games (Goals) |
| 2017–2022 (S6) | Adelaide | 46 (50) |
| 2022 (S7)–2023 | Port Adelaide | 20 (3) |
| Total | | 66 (53) |
- ^{1} Playing statistics correct to the end of the 2023 season.

Career highlights
- Club: 3× AFLW premiership player (2017, 2019, 2022 (S6)); 2× AFLW premiership co-captain (2017, 2019); 2× Adelaide Club Champion (2017, 2019); Adelaide co-captain (2017–2020); 2× Adelaide leading goalkicker (2018, 2021); Port Adelaide captain (2022 (S7)–2023); Representative: 3× All-Australian (2017, 2019, 2021); Honours: 2× AFLW league best and fairest (2017, 2019); 2× AFLW Players' Most Valuable Player Award (2017, 2019); 2× AFLW Grand Final Best on Ground: 2017, 2019; AFL Coaches Association AFLW Champion Player of the Year (2019); Goal of the Year (2017)

=== Adelaide Football Club (2017–2022 (S6)) ===
With the AFL planning to launch a national Australian rules football women's competition in 2017, Phillips agreed to become a marquee signing for Port Adelaide, her father's club in the SANFL, if they received a licence for the inaugural AFL Women's (AFLW) season. By March 2016, however, Port Adelaide decided not to bid for a licence for 2017 in order to focus on their plan to play the first AFL game in China that same year.

As a result, Phillips instead ended up signing with the Adelaide Football Club as a rookie, a spot reserved for footballers coming from other sports. She had previously stated it was "highly unlikely" that she would join Adelaide if Port Adelaide were not granted a licence. Phillips later reneged, saying, "When the Adelaide Crows contacted me I was just so blown away how professional they were and how committed they were, not only just in getting me to play but how committed they were to the women's game itself." She also commented that she thought "[her] time had passed at playing football" when Port Adelaide did not pursue a licence.

Phillips had not played in a football match since participating in the Little Heroes Slowdown in 2004, a charity match featuring retired AFL and SANFL players as well as celebrities. She was named best on ground in that game. Before she returned to training in 2016, the last time she had played football in a competitive league was 17 years earlier at 13 years old.

==== 2017: Inaugural best and fairest, AFLW premiership ====
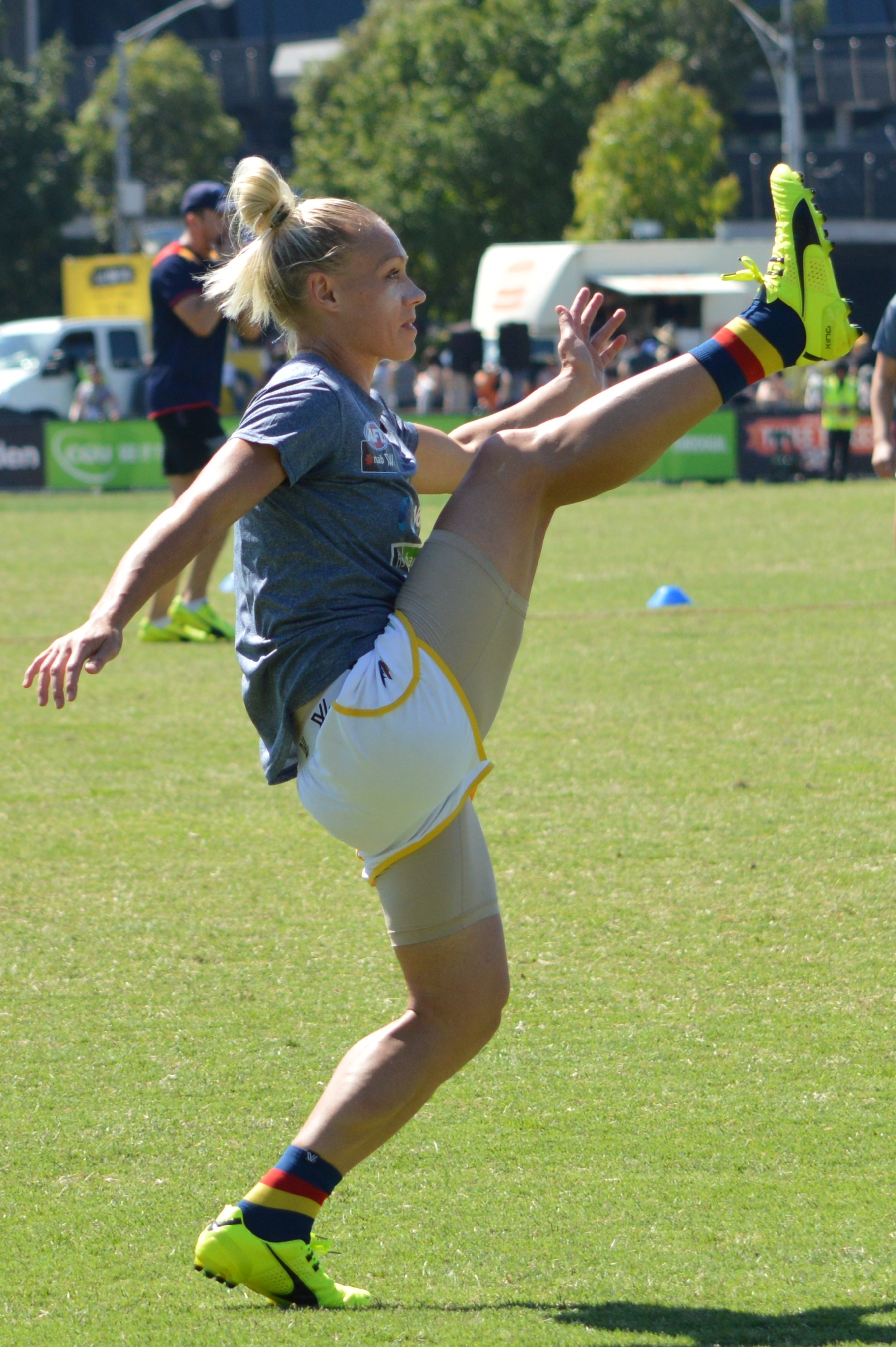
Phillips kicking

Phillips was named as a co-captain of Adelaide for the inaugural 2017 AFLW season, along with Chelsea Randall, one of the club's marquee signings. Although Phillips received approval from the Dallas Wings to play in the AFLW during the WNBA offseason, medical insurance on her WNBA contract did not cover any injuries from playing Australian rules football. Despite the possibility of an injury voiding her WNBA contract or the fact that her salary was about ten times higher in the WNBA compared to the AFLW, Phillips decided to play in the league at her own risk.

The 2017 AFLW competition consisted of eight teams playing a home-and-away schedule of seven games, one against each of the other teams. At the end of the season, the top two teams on the ladder would contest the Grand Final. Adelaide had a strong start to the season, winning their first two games with the largest margin of victory in each week. Phillips was awarded best on ground in both games, receiving the maximum three votes that were to be tallied at the end of the season to decide the competition's best and fairest. She led the Crows in goals in the first game of the season with three. Although Adelaide trailed at three-quarter time against Carlton in Round 3, Phillips led her team to victory with the only goal of the final term, which she kicked from a long distance of 60 metres. Phillips was awarded best on ground for the third and final time during the home-and-away season in Adelaide's Round 4 win, leading the Crows with 18 disposals.

Adelaide and Brisbane entered their Round 5 encounter as the only remaining unbeaten teams in the competition, even though the press had not expected either team to be top two on the ladder. After Adelaide led at three-quarter time, they lost the game after conceding the only goal of the final term. This was the only game of the season that Phillips did not receive any votes as one of the three best players on the ground. She received an additional two votes in both of the last two games of the season. Adelaide lost their next game as well to Melbourne, who were led by Daisy Pearce. With the loss, the Crows were left with the same number of wins as Melbourne and retained the second position on the ladder only by virtue of their much better points percentage. After Melbourne began the last round with a win, Adelaide needed to win their game against Collingwood to finish second on the ladder. Although Adelaide trailed by seven points entering the final term, they won the game with the only five goals in the last quarter, the first two from Sarah Perkins who had four in total and the next two from Phillips who kicked three in total.

The inaugural 2017 AFLW Grand Final was a rematch of Adelaide's Round 5 loss to Brisbane, who won the right to host the match as minor premiers. Adelaide won by a score of 4.11 (35) to 4.5 (29), never trailing in the match. Phillips won best on ground, having recorded 28 disposals, 7 marks, and 7 tackles, all personal season-bests and team-highs in the game. She also kicked both of Adelaide's goals in the second half. Phillips ended the year as the third-leading goalkicker in the AFLW with ten goals. At the AFLW Awards, Phillips was named the inaugural AFLW best and fairest, finishing the season with 14 votes, four ahead of the Western Bulldogs' Ellie Blackburn and Melbourne's Karen Paxman. Her match-winner from Round 3 against Carlton was also named the AFLW Goal of the Year. She was also a finalist for AFLW Mark of the Year for an on-the-shoulders mark that she took against Melbourne, losing the award to Darcy Vescio. Phillips also won the AFLW Players' Most Valuable Player Award and was named to the All-Australian team.

==== 2018: Struggle with injuries ====
Phillips struggled with a right quad injury through much of the 2018 season. She first injured the quad in the preseason and then aggravated it the day before the start of the season, keeping her out for the first two games. Adelaide lost both of those games without Phillips, which were against Brisbane and Melbourne. When Phillips returned, Adelaide resumed winning as Phillips starred with four of Adelaide's six goals and two of their five behinds, earning best on ground. However, this was the only game of the year where Phillips earned any votes. After a draw against Greater Western Sydney in heavy rain, Adelaide won their next two games in Round 5 and Round 6. Phillips's quad injury forced her to miss the second half of the Round 5 win. She recovered to kick three goals the following week. Just like in 2017, Adelaide entered their Round 7 game against Collingwood needing a win to make the AFLW Grand Final. This time, however, Adelaide squandered a 17-point lead in the second quarter and lost the game after defender Chelsea Randall missed the second half due to a concussion.

==== 2019: Second best and fairest, second AFLW premiership ====
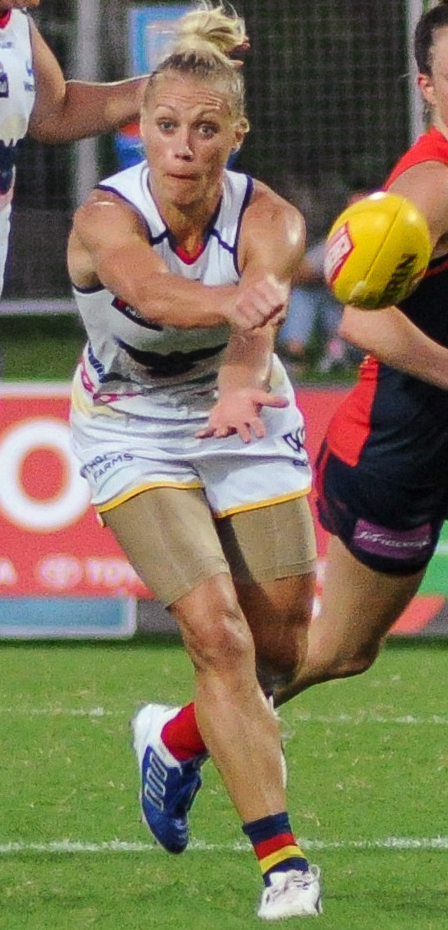
Phillips handballing

With the expansion of the AFLW to 10 teams for the 2019 season, the league was restructured into two conferences. The number of home-and-away games was kept at seven, and the finals system was expanded to include one pair of preliminary finals before the grand final. Adelaide opened the season with a one-point loss to the Western Bulldogs, the reigning premiers, largely as a result of kicking an inaccurate 1.11 (17). Despite the loss, Phillips earned two votes with 18 disposals and two behinds. From the next game on, Phillips and the Adelaide Crows dominated the rest of the season. They did not lose another game, and Phillips received three votes for best on ground in five of the six remaining games. After their 13-point Round 2 win against Carlton, Adelaide won each of their last five home-and-away games by at least 29 points. They won the minor premiership after finishing tied with Fremantle with six wins, but had a markedly better percentage in part due to defeating them by 42 points in Round 4 in Fremantle's only loss. Phillips had a season-high 25 disposals as well as two goals in that win against Fremantle. She kicked a season-high three goals one week earlier against Geelong.

"It's pretty emotional ... It's an absolute dream come true, not just for our girls but for Carlton as well. To play in front of this crowd means so much and is incredible for women's footy."

— Phillips reflecting on the unexpected record attendance at the 2019 AFLW Grand Final and the game after tearing her ACL and winning best on ground

Adelaide continued their dominance into the finals, winning their preliminary final against Geelong by a season-high margin of 66 points and keeping their opponents scoreless through three-quarter time. They held Geelong to just seven points, the lowest score in AFLW history at the time. Phillips had 23 disposals in the game, trailing only her teammate Ebony Marinoff who had 27. Adelaide faced Carlton in the 2019 AFLW Grand Final. In front of 53,034 fans, a record for a standalone women's sporting event in Australia, Adelaide won convincingly by a score of 10.3 (63) to 2.6 (18). Despite not playing the final quarter after tearing the ACL in her left knee late in the third quarter, Phillips was named AFLW Grand Final best on ground for the second time. She had 18 disposals and kicked two goals before leaving the game. She received a standing ovation when she was taken off the field on a stretcher. At the end of the season, Phillips won her second AFLW best and fairest award. She accumulated 19 out of 21 possible votes from her seven matches, and finished eight votes ahead of Fremantle's Dana Hooker. Like in 2017, she was the third-leading goalkicker in the AFLW, this time behind teammates Stevie-Lee Thompson and Danielle Ponter. Phillips made the All-Australian team for the second time, and was also named captain of the team. She again won the AFLW Players' Most Valuable Player Award.

==== 2020–22: Return from injury and third premiership ====
For the 2020 season, the league expanded to 14 teams and the season was extended to eight games. An additional round of finals was added, allowing three of the seven teams from each conference and six in total to make the finals. Phillips was not ready to return from her ACL injury until Round 4. In her return, Adelaide lost to Carlton in a rematch of the previous year's grand final. Phillips had 13 disposals in the loss. After missing Round 5 due to soreness resulting from not playing for 11 months, Phillips played one more game the following week. After Round 6, the AFLW cancelled the remainder of the home-and-away season in favour of starting the finals early due to the global COVID-19 pandemic. Even though the finals were also expanded from six to eight teams, Adelaide did not qualify with just two wins in their first six matches. Ultimately, the finals series was cancelled due to the pandemic after only the first round was played.

Before the start of the 2021 season, Phillips relinquished her role as co-captain with Randall, setting up Randall to be appointed sole captain of the team. The league was restructured back to a single ladder in which the top six teams made the finals and the top two teams received byes into the preliminary finals. Adelaide entered the last round third on the ladder behind Brisbane and Collingwood. Although they were never in the top two because of losses to Fremantle and Melbourne, they were able to finish on top of the ladder by defeating Collingwood after Brisbane's loss earlier in the round. Phillips played better in the first half of the season, being named best on ground twice, first in Round 1 against West Coast and then in Round 4 against Brisbane. She also earned one vote in each of her team's next two games, including against Gold Coast when Adelaide scored 85 points, the second-highest total in AFLW history at the time. She kicked at least one goal in the first six games of the season, highlighted by four of her team's six goals against Brisbane, tying her career high for goals in a game. In the second half of the season, Phillips struggled with an injury to her left knee that was first aggravated in Round 5 and not publicly disclosed until after the season ended. After Round 6, she did not receive any more votes. Although Phillips scored two goals in Adelaide's preliminary final win against Melbourne, she did not reach ten disposals in either of her finals games, despite tallying at least fourteen in all of her home-and-away games. Adelaide lost the 2021 AFLW Grand Final to Brisbane. Phillips had minor surgery on her left knee a week later. Overall, she was named to her third All-Australian team and finished the season as Adelaide's leading goalkicker for the second time.

Phillips played 11 games in 2022 season 6, and averaged some of the highest playing statistics of her career in tackles, marks and disposals. She predominantly played up forward and rotated through the midfield during the season, kicking a goal in the Crows' 13-point premiership victory over Melbourne at Adelaide Oval, her third premiership in the league. She finished fourth in the club's best and fairest count.

=== Port Adelaide Football Club (2022 (S7)–2023) ===
Erin Phillips being chaired off Alberton Oval by Justine Mules and Ange Foley after her final AFLW game

The other South Australian AFL club, Port Adelaide, was granted a license to compete in the AFLW in 2022 season 7. Though she reportedly considered retiring from the game, Phillips elected to become Port's first marquee signing ahead of the season, and play for the club her father won eight SANFL premierships with. She was appointed the club's inaugural captain, with Ange Foley her vice-captain.

At the end of the 2023 season, after 66 AFLW games, Phillips announced her retirement from professional sport.

=== Style of play ===
Phillips plays primarily as a midfielder who is also a goal-scoring threat like a forward. She excels at being able to read plays in order to capitalize on opportunities, such as creating set shots for her teammates off of free kicks. Phillips was the all-time AFLW leading goalkicker at the end of 2019, having kicked 28 goals in the league's first three seasons. She is capable of kicking goals in a variety of ways. She can kick from long distances such as her 60-metre AFLW Goal of the Year in 2017, or from sharp angles in the pocket. In addition to scoring goals, Phillips is prolific at score involvements, leading the league in that statistic by wide margins in 2017, 2019, and 2021. Although Phillips is not one of the bigger players in the competition, she is tough and physical – useful traits for taking marks either in the air or after bodying off defenders to establish positioning. She is not considered one of the faster players in the league due to her relative age compared to other players.

=== AFLW statistics ===
Legend
| G | Goals | K | Kicks | D | Disposals | T | Tackles |
| B | Behinds | H | Handballs | M | Marks |
| # | Played in that season's premiership team | † | Led the league for the season | ± | Won that season's AFLW B&F |

| Season | Team | No. | Games | Totals | | | | | | | Averages (per game) | | | | | | | Votes |
| Season | Team | No. | Games | G | B | K | H | D | M | T | G | B | K | H | D | M | T | Votes |
|---|---|---|---|---|---|---|---|---|---|---|---|---|---|---|---|---|---|---|
| 2017^{#} | Adelaide | 13 | 8 | 10 | 8 | 124^{†} | 36 | 160^{†} | 23 | 30 | 1.3 | 1.0 | 15.5^{†} | 4.5 | 20.0 | 2.9 | 3.8 | 14^{±} |
| 2018 | Adelaide | 13 | 5 | 7 | 3 | 46 | 14 | 60 | 8 | 11 | 1.4 | 0.6 | 9.2 | 2.8 | 12.0 | 1.6 | 2.2 | 3 |
| 2019^{#} | Adelaide | 13 | 9 | 11 | 11^{†} | 129 | 64 | 193 | 31 | 29 | 1.2 | 1.2^{†} | 14.3 | 7.1 | 21.4 | 3.4 | 3.6 | 19^{±} |
| 2020 | Adelaide | 13 | 2 | 0 | 1 | 21 | 5 | 26 | 4 | 5 | 0.0 | 0.5 | 10.5 | 2.5 | 13.0 | 2.0 | 2.5 | 0 |
| 2021 | Adelaide | 13 | 11 | 14 | 9 | 128 | 54 | 182 | 50 | 24 | 1.3 | 0.8 | 11.6 | 4.9 | 16.5 | 4.5 | 2.2 | 8 |
| 2022 (S6)^{#} | Adelaide | 13 | 11 | 8 | 9 | 124 | 65 | 189 | 48 | 29 | 0.7 | 0.8 | 11.3 | 5.9 | 17.2 | 4.4 | 2.6 | 5 |
| 2022 (S7) | Port Adelaide | 1 | 10 | 0 | 6 | 79 | 67 | 146 | 21 | 28 | 0.0 | 0.6 | 7.9 | 6.7 | 14.6 | 2.1 | 2.8 | 2 |
| 2023 | Port Adelaide | 1 | 10 | 3 | 6 | 117 | 46 | 163 | 30 | 18 | 0.3 | 0.6 | 11.7 | 4.6 | 16.3 | 3.0 | 1.8 | 3 |
| Career | | | 66 | 53 | 53 | 768 | 351 | 1,119 | 215 | 174 | 0.8 | 0.8 | 11.6 | 5.3 | 17.0 | 3.3 | 2.6 | 54 |

== Other activities ==
Phillips was the Adelaide Lightning's WNBL Ambassador during the 2005–06 season as part of a program to promote the league's athletes as role models.

She has also served as a club ambassador for Port Adelaide, and has participated in their community youth program to educate primary school students about physical and mental health.

Phillips has been the co-host of a weekday Adelaide morning radio show with Mark Soderstrom on Mix 102.3. The show is eponymously named Erin Phillips & Soda in the Morning. She began hosting permanently in December 2020, after Jodie Oddy left the show. Phillips had previously co-hosted on a temporary basis when Oddy was on maternity leave.

== Recognition and honours ==
Phillips was awarded the Medal of the Order of Australia in the 2021 Queen's Birthday Honours, for "service to Australian rules football, and to basketball".

In 2022, after the Crows' win over Melbourne, local Adelaide photographer Alex Frayne took a photo of Phillips as the team celebrated in Rundle Mall. The photograph was acquired by the National Portrait Gallery in Canberra.

On 10 June 2025 she was inducted into the Australian Football Hall of Fame, followed by West Coast head coach Daisy Pearce, making them the first AFLW players to be awarded this honour. Phillips was the second woman ever to be inducted, following the Debbie Lee's induction in 2021.

== Personal life ==
Phillips married American former basketball player Tracy Gahan, whom she met when they became teammates on the Adelaide Lightning in the WNBL in 2006, in the United States in 2014 (before same-sex marriage was legalised in Australia). They have twins (boy and girl) born in 2016, a second son born in 2019, all born in the US (during the AFL off-season, when Phillips was an assistant coach with the Dallas Wings), and a daughter born in Australia in 2023. All four children were conceived using IVF treatment. The couple relocated to Adelaide in 2016, when the AFLW started up and Phillips started playing for the Crows.

Phillips was one of many female athletes in Australia who advocated for the legalisation of same-sex marriage in the lead-up to the nationwide marriage law postal survey in late 2017. The positive support found in the survey led to its legalisation before the end of that year. While Phillips does not see herself as a leading advocate for LGBT rights, she has presented her marriage openly and wants to be seen as a role model to others in this respect, in particular to young girls and both male and female athletes.

Phillips' sister Amy is married to Australian rules footballer Shaun Burgoyne, who has played for Port Adelaide and Hawthorn. Phillips also played on the same football team as Burgoyne's younger brother Phil when they were children.

In 2008, "provocative pictures" from a photo shoot of Phillips were published in Alpha magazine. This was during the lead up to the 2008 Olympics, and Phillips was quoted as saying, "We're not going to be team USA's little bitch."

In 2025, an autobiography of Phillips written with sports journalist Samantha Lane, Inside Out: A Story of Sport, Family and Self, was published. In it, Phillips describes her struggles with body image.

== See also ==
- List of Australian WNBA players
- List of Olympic medalists in basketball
- List of AFL Women's best and fairest winners
- List of AFL Women's premiership captains and coaches
