= 2022 AFL Women's season 7 best and fairest =

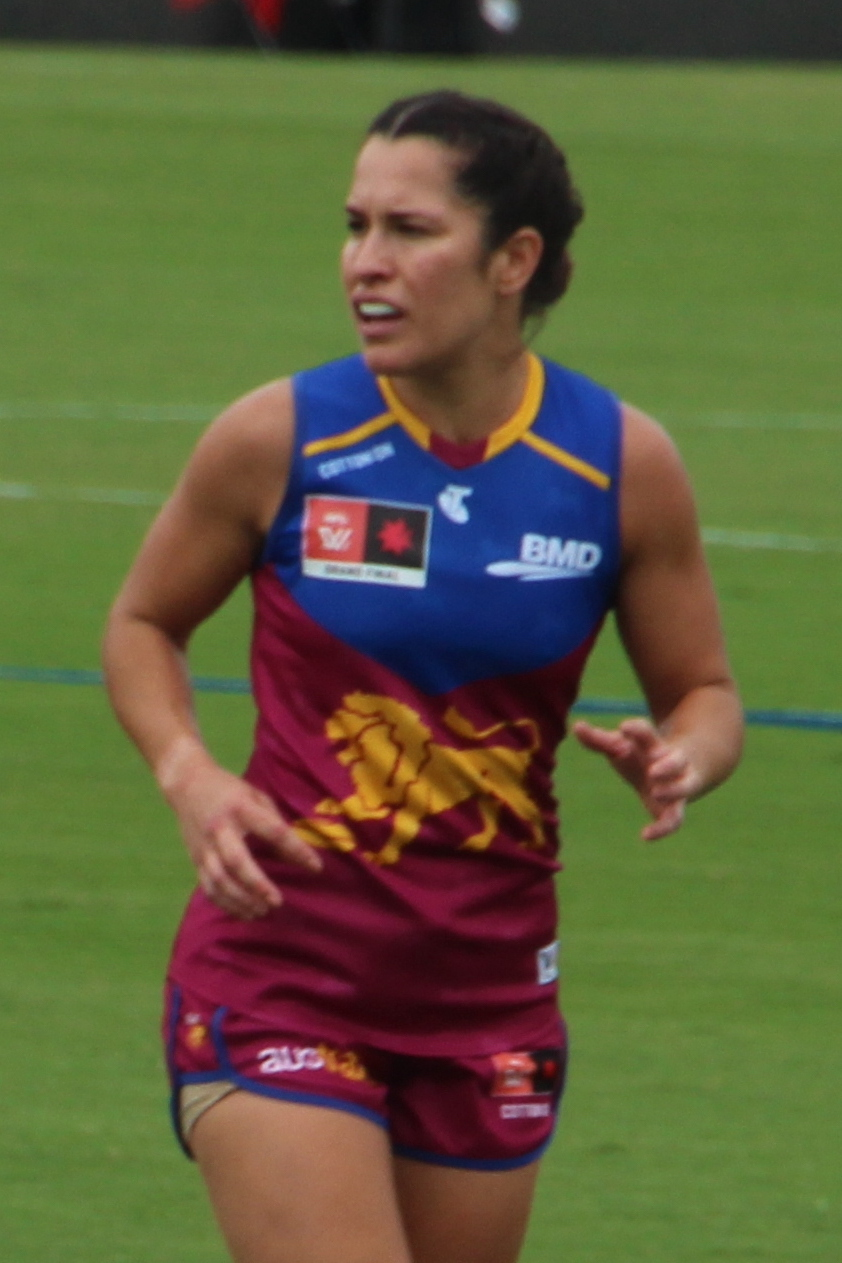
- Ally Anderson, season 7 winner
- Date: 22 November 2022
- Venue: Crown Melbourne
- Hosted by: Sarah Jones
- Winner: Ally Anderson (Brisbane)

Television/radio coverage
- Network: Fox Footy

The 2022 AFL Women's season 7 best and fairest award was presented to the player adjudged the best and fairest player during 2022 AFL Women's season 7. Brisbane's Ally Anderson won the award with 21 votes, becoming the second consecutive Brisbane player to win the award after teammate Emily Bates won the season 6 award. Having missed selection in the 2022 AFL Women's season 7 All-Australian team, Anderson became the first AFLW player to win the league best and fairest award but miss All-Australian selection in the same season.

== Leading votegetters ==
Placing	Player	Votes
1	Ally Anderson (Brisbane)	21
2	Monique Conti (Richmond)	19
3	Ebony Marinoff (Adelaide)	18
4	Maddy Prespakis (Essendon)	17
5	Olivia Purcell (Melbourne)	16
6	Alyce Parker (Greater Western Sydney)	15
6	Charlie Rowbottom (Gold Coast)	15
6	Georgie Prespakis (Geelong)*	15
9	Ellie Blackburn (Western Bulldogs)	14
9	Kiara Bowers (Fremantle)	14

* Georgie Prespakis was ineligible to win the award after being suspended by the AFL Tribunal during the home-and-away season.

== Voting procedure ==
The three field umpires (the umpires who control the flow of the game, as opposed to goal or boundary umpires) confer after each match and award three votes, two votes and one vote to the players they regard as the best, second-best and third-best in the match, respectively. The votes are kept secret until the awards night, and are read and tallied on the evening.
