= Ally Anderson =

Australian rules footballer

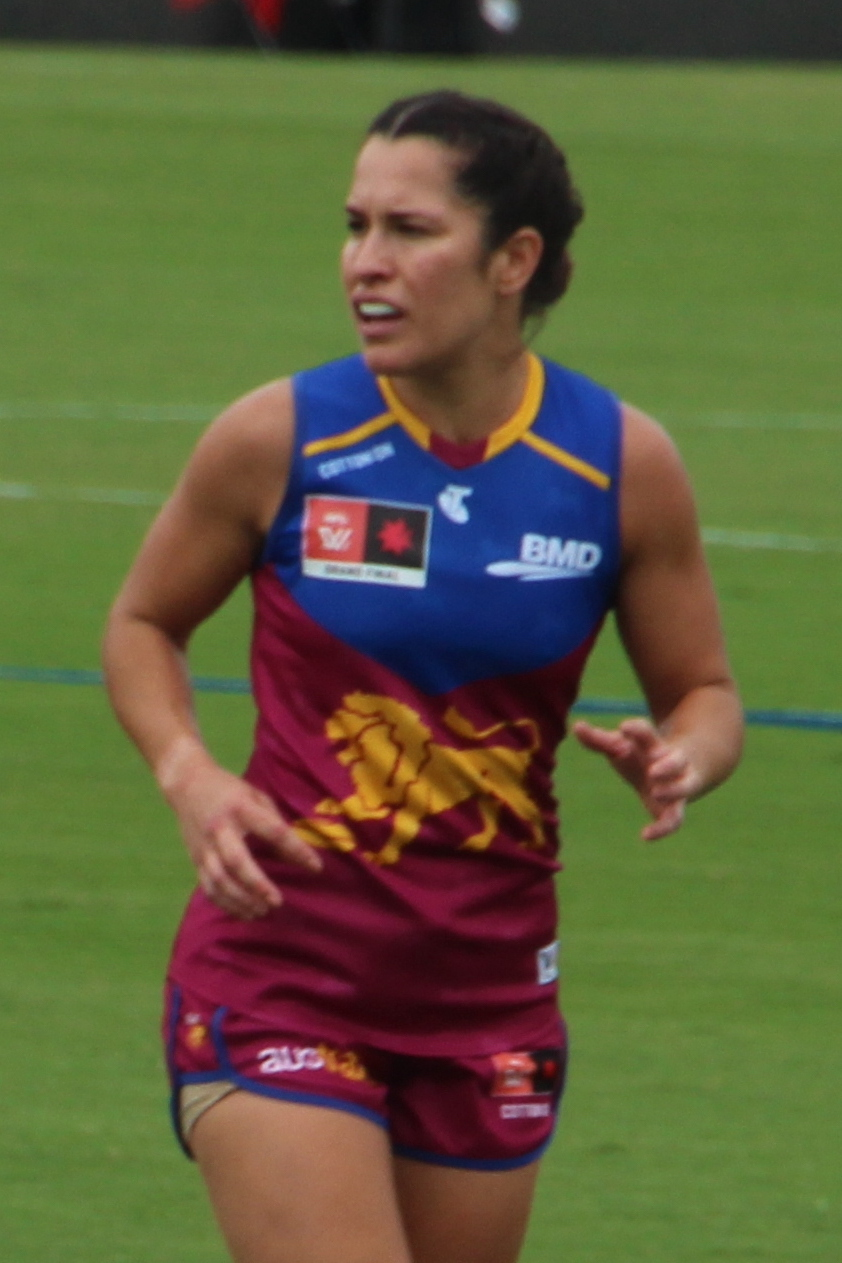
- Anderson playing for Brisbane in 2022

Personal information
- Full name: Alexandra Janaya Anderson
- Born: 25 March 1994 (age 32); Brisbane, Queensland
- Original team: Zillmere (QWAFL)
- Draft: No. 47, 2016 national draft
- Debut: Round 1, 2017, Brisbane vs. Melbourne, at Casey Fields
- Height: 162 cm (5 ft 4 in)
- Position: Midfielder

Club information
- Current club: Brisbane
- Number: 18

Playing career^{1}
Years	Club	Games (Goals)
2017–	Brisbane	108 (16)
- ^{1} Playing statistics correct to the end of the 2025 season.

Career highlights
- 2× AFL Women's premiership player: 2021, 2023; AFL Women's best and fairest: S7; AFL Women's games record holder; Brisbane games record holder; 3× AFL Women's All-Australian team: 2019, 2023, 2024; 4× Brisbane best and fairest: 2019, 2021, 2023, 2024

Alexandra Janaya Anderson (born 25 March 1994) is an Australian rules footballer playing for the Brisbane Lions in the AFL Women's (AFLW). Anderson won the 2022 AFL Women's season 7 best and fairest award, and is a dual AFL Women's premiership player, three-time AFL Women's All-Australian and four-time Brisbane best and fairest winner. Anderson is the Brisbane and AFL Women's games record holder with 108 games.

== Early life ==
Anderson was born in 1994 in Brisbane, Queensland raised by Leigh and Reggie (a paramedic and Aboriginal Gangulu Redcliffe Dolphins rugby league player) from Theodore, Queensland inland from Rockhampton. Anderson took up rugby league with her sisters at the age of 5 and also took up tennis and swimming. Anderson was educated at Kedron State High School.

Anderson had never seen an AFL game prior to the age of 16 and knew very little of the sport. Anderson began learning of the game after her older sister Mikayla started playing it and was encouraged by her school teacher who was from Melbourne to pursue a career in the sport. Anderson played club football for the Zillmere from junior to senior level and represented Queensland at Under 18 level in 2013.

== AFL Women's career ==
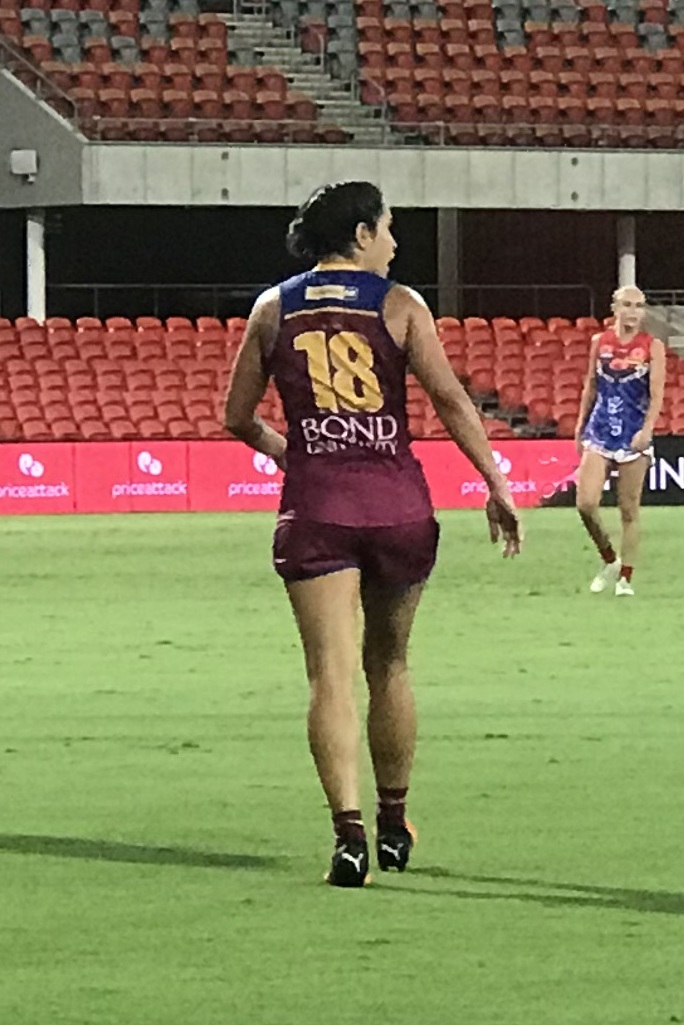
Anderson playing for Brisbane in 2022

Anderson was recruited by Brisbane with the number 47 pick in the 2016 AFL Women's draft and debuted in the Lions' inaugural game against Melbourne at Casey Fields on 5 February 2017. Anderson went on to play all eight games in her debut season, including the six-point 2017 AFL Women's Grand Final loss to Adelaide. Brisbane signed Anderson for the 2018 season during the trade period in May 2017.

Anderson played all eight games for Brisbane again in 2018, including the 2018 AFL Women's Grand Final loss to the Western Bulldogs, Brisbane's second consecutive grand final loss. Brisbane signed Anderson for the 2019 season during the trade and signing period in May 2018.

Anderson had a career-best season in 2019, capped off by winning the Brisbane best and fairest award and being selected in the 2019 AFL Women's All-Australian team. Following the AFL Women's season, Anderson played for Essendon in the VFL Women's (VFLW).

Leading into the 2020 season, womens.afl journalist Sarah Black named Anderson at no. 26 on her list of the top 30 players in the AFLW. She was also selected in the AFL Players Association's 2017–2019 retrospective AFL Women's 22under22 team. Anderson finished the season as one of fourteen players to have played the most AFL Women's matches to that point with 30.

Anderson was named at no. 21 in Sarah Black's 2022 list of the top 30 players in the AFLW. She was named among Brisbane's best players in its loss to Adelaide in round 1 and its wins over Geelong in round 4 and West Coast in round 8, polling seven coaches' votes in the round 8 match. Anderson and teammate Emily Bates became the first AFLW players to reach the 50-game milestone in Brisbane's round 9 win over North Melbourne, with both among Brisbane's best players.

Leading into the 2023 season, Sarah Black named Anderson at no. 5 on her annual list of the top 30 players in the AFLW.

In 2024, Anderson was named Brisbane's best player in its loss to North Melbourne in week 1 and was best afield in its win over Melbourne in week 2 with an AFLW record 43 disposals. She was among Brisbane's best players in wins over Collingwood in week 3, and the Western Bulldogs and West Coast in both week 4 matches.

== Statistics ==
Updated to the end of the 2025 season.

Legend
G	Goals	K	Kicks	D	Disposals	T	Tackles
B	Behinds	H	Handballs	M	Marks
#	Played in that season's premiership team	±	Won that season's AFLW B&F

Season	Team	No.	Games	Totals							Averages (per game)							Votes
Season	Team	No.	Games	G	B	K	H	D	M	T	G	B	K	H	D	M	T	Votes
2017	Brisbane	18	8	0	1	29	29	58	6	26	0.0	0.1	3.6	3.6	7.3	0.8	3.3	0
2018	Brisbane	18	8	1	0	90	53	143	22	40	0.1	0.0	11.3	6.6	17.9	2.8	5.0	1
2019	Brisbane	18	7	1	0	91	56	147	27	35	0.1	0.0	13.0	8.0	21.0	3.9	5.0	3
2020	Brisbane	18	7	0	2	73	55	128	30	17	0.0	0.3	10.4	7.9	18.3	4.3	2.4	2
2021^{#}	Brisbane	18	11	2	1	121	83	204	32	39	0.2	0.1	11.0	7.5	18.5	2.9	3.5	9
2022 (S6)	Brisbane	18	12	2	4	132	68	200	26	50	0.2	0.3	11.0	5.7	16.7	2.2	4.2	2
2022 (S7)	Brisbane	18	13	2	4	178	100	278	42	69	0.2	0.3	13.7	7.7	21.4	3.2	5.3	21^{±}
2023^{#}	Brisbane	18	13	1	5	173	143	316	38	84	0.1	0.4	13.3	11.0	24.3	2.9	6.5	12
2024	Brisbane	18	14	2	7	183	182	365	34	93	0.1	0.5	13.1	13.0	26.1	2.4	6.6	8
2025	Brisbane	18	15	5	4	187	182	369	40	71	0.3	0.3	12.5	12.1	24.6	2.7	4.7	3
Career			108	16	28	1257	951	2208	297	524	0.1	0.3	11.6	8.8	20.4	2.8	4.9	61

== Honours and achievements ==
Team

- 2× AFL Women's premiership player (Brisbane): 2021, 2023
- 2× AFL Women's minor premiership (Brisbane): 2017, S7
- McClelland Trophy (Brisbane): 2025

Individual

- AFL Women's best and fairest: S7
- AFL Women's equal games record holder
- Brisbane games record holder
- 3× AFL Women's All-Australian team: 2019, 2023, 2024
- 4× Brisbane best and fairest: 2019, 2021, 2023, 2024
