= List of AFL Women's debuts in 2022 season 6 =

The following is the list of players in the AFL Women's (AFLW) who either made their AFLW debut or played for a new club during 2022 AFL Women's season 6.

== Summary ==
Summary of debuts in 2022 (S6)
Club	Debut		Total
Club	AFLW	New club	Total
Adelaide	4	0	4
Brisbane	5	1	6
Carlton	7	1	8
Collingwood	3	2	5
Fremantle	11	0	11
Geelong	7	2	9
Gold Coast	6	2	8
Greater Western Sydney	8	3	11
Melbourne	3	3	6
North Melbourne	3	2	5
Richmond	4	4	8
St Kilda	4	1	4
West Coast	5	2	7
Western Bulldogs	5	3	5
Total	75	26	101

== AFL Women's debuts ==
Name	Club	Age at debut	Debut round	Notes
Lucy Burke	St Kilda	23 years, 342 days	1	2021 Replacement signing
Leah Cutting	St Kilda	29 years, 299 days	1	2021 Free agent
Meagan Kiely	Richmond	27 years, 23 days	1	Pick 48, 2021 AFL Women's draft
Stella Reid	Richmond	18 years, 119 days	1	Pick 5, 2021 AFL Women's draft
Emelia Yassir	Richmond	18 years, 104 days	1	Pick 16, 2021 AFL Women's draft
Tess Craven	North Melbourne	18 years, 16 days	1	Pick 13, 2021 AFL Women's draft
Jasmine Ferguson	North Melbourne	22 years, 227 days	1	Pick 51, 2021 AFL Women's draft
Amy Smith	North Melbourne	23 years, 59 days	1	Pick 55, 2020 AFL Women's draft
Zali Friswell	Geelong	18 years, 9 days	1	Pick 7, 2021 AFL Women's draft
Olivia Fuller	Geelong	22 years, 94 days	1	2021 Special assistance selection
Claudia Gunjaca	Geelong	24 years, 136 days	1	2021 Special assistance selection
Annabel Johnson	Geelong	21 years, 63 days	1	Pick 15, 2021 AFL Women's draft
Rachel Kearns	Geelong	24 years, 207 days	1	2021 Rookie signing (Ireland)
Georgie Prespakis	Geelong	18 years, 301 days	1	Pick 2, 2021 AFL Women's draft
Dana East	Fremantle	19 years, 212 days	1	Pick 31, 2021 AFL Women's draft
Jessica Low	Fremantle	22 years, 64 days	1	Pick 52, 2021 AFL Women's draft
Ann McMahon	Fremantle	27 years, 191 days	1	Pick 35, 2019 AFL Women's draft
Airlie Runnalls	Fremantle	23 years, 197 days	1	Pick 44, 2021 AFL Women's draft
Aine Tighe	Fremantle	29 years, 167 days	1	2019 Rookie signing (Ireland)
Makaela Tuhakaraina	Fremantle	18 years, 138 days	1	Pick 38, 2021 AFL Women's draft
Charlie Thomas	West Coast	18 years, 125 days	1	Pick 3, 2021 AFL Women's draft
Amanda Ling	Western Bulldogs	19 years, 183 days	1	Pick 22, 2021 AFL Women's draft
Elizabeth Snell	Western Bulldogs	19 years, 300 days	1	Pick 27, 2021 AFL Women's draft
Maggie Caris	Melbourne	19 years, 18 days	1	Pick 17, 2020 AFL Women's draft
Eliza West	Melbourne	24 years, 227 days	1	2021 Rookie signing (basketball)
Jasmine Simmons	Adelaide	22 years, 309 days	1	2021 Rookie signing (basketball)
Jess Good	Carlton	27 years, 158 days	1	2021 Free agent
Courtney Jones	Carlton	21 years, 121 days	1	Pick 59, 2019 AFL Women's draft
Annie Lee	Carlton	18 years, 134 days	1	Pick 10, 2021 AFL Women's draft
Paige Trudgeon	Carlton	21 years, 152 days	1	2020 Free agent
Eloise Chaston	Collingwood	19 years, 320 days	1	Pick 32, 2021 AFL Women's draft
Eliza James	Collingwood	18 years, 100 days	1	Pick 29, 2021 AFL Women's draft
Alana Barba	Gold Coast	20 years, 105 days	1	2021 Replacement signing
Tara Bohanna	Gold Coast	26 years, 313 days	1	2021 Replacement signing
Jacqui Dupuy	Gold Coast	27 years, 174 days	1	2021 Replacement signing
Charlie Rowbottom	Gold Coast	18 years, 352 days	1	Pick 1, 2021 AFL Women's draft
Ally Dallaway	Greater Western Sydney	22 years, 352 days	1	2021 Replacement signing
Ally Morphett	Greater Western Sydney	18 years, 59 days	1	Pick 37, 2021 AFL Women's draft
Bríd Stack	Greater Western Sydney	35 years, 24 days	1	2020 Rookie signing (Ireland)
Meg Macdonald	Richmond	23 years, 199 days	2	2021 Replacement signing
Imogen Barnett	Collingwood	26 years, 188 days	2	Pick 33, 2021 AFL Women's draft
Gabbi Featherston	Geelong	18 years, 64 days	2	Pick 9, 2021 AFL Women's draft
Ashanti Bush	Gold Coast	19 years, 151 days	2	Pick 8, 2021 AFL Women's draft
Emily Pease	Greater Western Sydney	19 years, 219 days	2	Pick 29, 2020 AFL Women's draft
Courtney Rowley	West Coast	18 years, 120 days	3	Pick 21, 2021 AFL Women's draft
Sarah Lakay	West Coast	18 years, 336 days	3	Pick 40, 2021 AFL Women's draft
Abbie Ballard	Adelaide	19 years, 281 days	3	Pick 34, 2021 AFL Women's draft
Ashleigh Richards	St Kilda	18 years, 92 days	3	Pick 12, 2021 AFL Women's draft
Jessica Doyle	Greater Western Sydney	18 years, 130 days	3	Pick 49, 2021 AFL Women's draft
Zimmorlei Farquharson	Brisbane	19 years, 273 days	3	Pick 8, 2020 AFL Women's draft
Ruby Svarc	Brisbane	28 years, 119 days	3	Pick 38, 2020 AFL Women's draft
Brooke Vickers	Carlton	18 years, 32 days	3	Pick 23, 2021 AFL Women's draft
Keeley Sherar	Carlton	18 years, 88 days	3	Pick 11, 2021 AFL Women's draft
Georgina Fowler	Greater Western Sydney	18 years, 40 days	4	Pick 59, 2021 AFL Women's draft
Casidhe Simmons	Greater Western Sydney	26 years, 356 days	4	Pick 60, 2021 AFL Women's draft
Brodee Mowbray	Greater Western Sydney	19 years, 148 days	4	Pick 55, 2021 AFL Women's draft
Poppy Schaap	Carlton	18 years, 186 days	4	2021 Replacement signing
Jemima Woods	Western Bulldogs	18 years, 249 days	4	2021 Replacement signing
Annabel Strahan	Western Bulldogs	19 years, 139 days	4	2020 Replacement signing
Mikayla Morrison	Fremantle	19 years, 337 days	4	Pick 30, 2020 AFL Women's draft
Amy Franklin	Fremantle	18 years, 362 days	4	Pick 14, 2021 AFL Women's draft
Lulu Pullar	Brisbane	23 years, 217 days	5	Pick 58, 2021 AFL Women's draft
Shannon Danckert	Gold Coast	25 years, 29 days	5	2021 Replacement signing
Ella Friend	St Kilda	18 years, 40 days	5	Pick 4, 2021 AFL Women's draft
Luka Yoshida-Martin	Brisbane	20 years, 309 days	6	Pick 53, 2021 AFL Women's draft
Aurora Smith	Western Bulldogs	18 years, 62 days	6	Pick 25, 2021 AFL Women's draft
Brooke Tonon	Adelaide	18 years, 153 days	7	Pick 20, 2021 AFL Women's draft
Emily Bennett	West Coast	19 years, 55 days	7	Pick 47, 2021 AFL Women's draft
Tahlia Gillard	Melbourne	18 years, 71 days	7	Pick 42, 2021 AFL Women's draft
Maggie MacLachlan	Fremantle	19 years, 187 days	9	2020 Replacement signing
Sarah Wielstra	Fremantle	26 years, 258 days	9	Pick 57, 2021 AFL Women's draft
Mikayla Western	Fremantle	24 years, 57 days	9	2022 Train on player
Beth Schilling	West Coast	18 years, 94 days	9	Pick 24, 2021 AFL Women's draft
Zoe Prowse	Adelaide	18 years, 253 days	10	Pick 17, 2021 AFL Women's draft
Maggie Harmer	Brisbane	18 years, 349 days	QF	Pick 18, 2021 AFL Women's draft

== Change of AFL Women's club ==
Name	Club	Age at debut	Debut round	Former club(s)	Recruiting method
Alana Woodward	St Kilda	31 years, 178 days	1	Greater Western Sydney	2021 Delisted free agent
Jess Hosking	Richmond	26 years, 36 days	1	Carlton	2021 Trade
Poppy Kelly	Richmond	23 years, 28 days	1	St Kilda	2021 Trade
Beth Lynch	Richmond	24 years, 233 days	1	North Melbourne	2021 Replacement signing
Maddie Shevlin	Richmond	24 years, 108 days	1	Collingwood	2021 Trade
Kim Rennie	North Melbourne	27 years, 81 days	1	Western Bulldogs	Pick 28, 2021 AFL Women's draft
Chantel Emonson	Geelong	28 years, 245 days	1	Melbourne	2021 Trade
Chloe Scheer	Geelong	22 years, 123 days	1	Adelaide	2021 Trade
Evangeline Gooch	West Coast	26 years, 85 days	1	Fremantle	2021 Trade
Aimee Schmidt	West Coast	28 years, 267 days	1	Greater Western Sydney	2021 Delisted free agent
Elle Bennetts	Western Bulldogs	32 years, 124 days	1	Greater Western Sydney	2021 Trade
Richelle Cranston	Western Bulldogs	32 years, 105 days	1	Melbourne & Geelong	2021 Delisted free agent
Alice Edmonds	Western Bulldogs	23 years, 222 days	1	Richmond	2021 Replacement signing
Alison Brown	Melbourne	24 years, 109 days	1	Carlton & St Kilda	Pick 45, 2021 AFL Women's draft
Tayla Harris	Melbourne	24 years, 267 days	1	Brisbane & Carlton	2021 Trade
Phoebe Monahan	Brisbane	28 years, 190 days	1	Greater Western Sydney & Richmond	2021 Delisted free agent
Jessica Dal Pos	Carlton	28 years, 111 days	1	Greater Western Sydney	2021 Trade
Alison Downie	Collingwood	37 years, 176 days	1	Carlton	2021 Delisted free agent
Sabrina Frederick	Collingwood	25 years, 56 days	1	Brisbane & Richmond	2021 Trade
Vivien Saad	Gold Coast	29 years, 200 days	1	North Melbourne	2021 Trade
Claudia Whitfort	Gold Coast	22 years, 162 days	1	Melbourne & St Kilda	2021 Trade
Chloe Dalton	Greater Western Sydney	28 years, 182 days	1	Carlton	2021 Trade
Katie Loynes	Greater Western Sydney	35 years, 292 days	1	Carlton	2021 Trade
Alexia Hamilton	North Melbourne	21 years, 89 days	2	Gold Coast	2021 Replacement signing
Jasmine Grierson	Greater Western Sydney	23 years, 257 days	4	Melbourne & North Melbourne	2021 Trade
Olivia Purcell	Melbourne	21 years, 169 days	7	Geelong	2021 Trade

== See also ==
- List of AFL Women's debuts in 2022 season 7
- List of AFL debuts in 2022
