= 2022–23 AFL Women's player movement period =

Eighth player movement period of the AFL Women's (AFLW) competition

The 2022–23 AFL Women's player movement period consisted of the various periods when the 18 clubs in the AFL Women's (AFLW) competition recruited players prior to the 2023 AFL Women's season.

== Priority signing period ==
Following the expectation of a stagnant draft, the AFL announced the introduction of a new priority signing period (PSP) in which the four expansion clubs Essendon, Hawthorn, Port Adelaide, and Sydney will be able to poach players who have played three or more AFLW seasons. Port Adelaide were also able to sign one underaged player.

Table of pre-list signings
| Date | Player | Club | Recruited from | Notes | Ref. |
|---|---|---|---|---|---|
| 22 February | Chloe Molloy | Sydney | Collingwood | | |
| 1 March | Ashleigh Woodland | Port Adelaide | Adelaide | | |
| 2 March | Emily Bates | Hawthorn | Brisbane | | |
| 2 March | Greta Bodey | Hawthorn | Brisbane | | |
| 3 March | Matilda Scholz | Port Adelaide | Glenelg (SANFLW) | Under-age signing | |
| 3 March | Janelle Cuthbertson | Port Adelaide | Fremantle | | |
| 7 March | Lucy McEvoy | Sydney | Carlton | | |
| 7 March | Brooke Brown | Essendon | North Melbourne | | |

== Signing and trading period ==
=== Retirements and delistings ===
Table of player retirements and delistings
| Date | Name | Club | Status | Ref |
|---|---|---|---|---|
| 18 October | Jess Duffin | Hawthorn | Retired | |
| 25 October | Kara Antonio | Fremantle | Retired | |
| 31 October | Tanya Hetherington | Greater Western Sydney | Retired | |
| 4 November | Liz McGrath | Port Adelaide | Delisted | |
| 4 November | Bella Ayre | Essendon | Delisted | |
| 4 November | Olivia Barton | Essendon | Delisted | |
| 4 November | Jordan Zanchetta | Essendon | Delisted | |
| 11 November | Ashlee Atkins | Gold Coast | Retired | |
| 13 November | Courtney Wakefield | Richmond | Retired | |
| 17 November | Imahra Cameron | West Coast | Delisted | |
| 17 November | Hayley Bullas | West Coast | Delisted | |
| 17 November | Emily Bennett | West Coast | Delisted | |
| 17 November | Ashleigh Gomes | West Coast | Delisted | |
| 17 November | Georgie Fowler | Greater Western Sydney | Delisted | |
| 17 November | Casidhe Simmons | Greater Western Sydney | Delisted | |
| 2 December | Ailish Considine | Adelaide | Delisted | |
| 6 December | Ashley Sharp | Fremantle | Retired | |
| 6 December | Hannah Burchell | Richmond | Delisted | |
| 7 December | Zoe Hurrell | Sydney | Delisted | |
| 7 December | Gen Lawson-Tavan | Sydney | Delisted | |
| 7 December | Alison Brown | Melbourne | Delisted | |
| 7 December | Sabreena Duffy | Melbourne | Delisted | |
| 7 December | Ella Little | Melbourne | Delisted | |
| 16 December | Krystal Scott | Gold Coast | Retired | |
| 16 December | Bríd Stack | Greater Western Sydney | Retired | |
| 20 December | Charlotte Hammans | Carlton | Delisted | |
| 20 December | Jessica Jones | Carlton | Delisted | |
| 20 December | Poppy Schaap | Carlton | Delisted | |
| 20 December | Sophie Abbatangelo | North Melbourne | Delisted | |
| 20 December | Grace Matser | North Melbourne | Delisted | |
| 12 January | Kate McCarthy | Hawthorn | Retired | |
| 18 January | Daisy Pearce | Melbourne | Retired | |
| 19 January | Marijana Rajcic | Adelaide | Retired | |
| 8 February | Dayna Cox | Adelaide | Retired | |
| 16 February | Dominique Carbone | Hawthorn | Delisted | |
| 16 February | Isabelle Porter | Hawthorn | Delisted | |
| 2 March | Brittany Perry | Port Adelaide | Delisted | |
| 2 March | Tessa Doumanis | Port Adelaide | Delisted | |
| 7 March | Tori Groves-Little | Gold Coast | Delisted | |
| 7 March | Jade Pregelj | Gold Coast | Delisted | |
| 9 March | Gabby Collingwood | Brisbane | Delisted | |
| 9 March | Maggie Harmer | Brisbane | Delisted | |
| 9 March | Ava Seton | Brisbane | Delisted | |
| 10 March | Tiarne Cavanagh | Sydney | Delisted | |
| 10 March | Sarah Dargan | Sydney | Delisted | |
| 10 March | Sarah Skinner | Sydney | Delisted | |
| 10 March | Matilda Sergeant | Fremantle | Delisted | |
| 10 March | Bianca Webb | Fremantle | Delisted | |
| 15 March | Lucy Burke | St Kilda | Delisted | |
| 15 March | Leah Cutting | St Kilda | Delisted | |
| 15 March | Jess Matin | St Kilda | Delisted | |
| 16 March | Eloise Chaston | Collingwood | Delisted | |
| 16 March | Abbi Moloney | Collingwood | Delisted | |
| 16 March | Sophie Molan | Richmond | Delisted | |
| 16 March | Saraid Taylor | Richmond | Delisted | |
| 17 March | Maddy McMahon | Geelong | Retired | |
| 17 March | Georgia Clarke | Geelong | Delisted | |
| 17 March | Kalani Scoullar | Geelong | Delisted | |
| 17 March | Shannon Danckert | Gold Coast | Delisted | |
| 17 March | Annise Bradfield | Gold Coast | Delisted | |
| 20 March | Jasmyn Hewett | Adelaide | Delisted | |
| 20 March | Alison Downie | Collingwood | Retired | |
| 20 March | Perri King | North Melbourne | Delisted | |
| 20 March | Maggie Caris | Melbourne | Delisted | |
| 21 March | Eloise Ashley-Cooper | Essendon | Delisted | |
| 21 March | Caitlin Sargent | Essendon | Delisted | |
| 21 March | Jorja Borg | Essendon | Delisted | |
| 21 March | Megan Ryan | Essendon | Delisted | |
| 21 March | Frederica Frew | Essendon | Delisted | |
| 21 March | Emily Goodsir | Greater Western Sydney | Delisted | |
| 21 March | Elise O'Dea | Carlton | Retired | |
| 27 March | Cora Staunton | Greater Western Sydney | Retired | |
| 19 April | Danielle Hardiman | North Melbourne | Retired | |
| 19 July | Sharni Webb | Brisbane | Retired | |

=== Rookie signings ===
In the absence of a rookie draft, each club was permitted to sign players that had not played Australian rules football within the previous three years or been involved in an AFLW high-performance program.

Table of rookie signings
| Club | Player | Recruited from | Other/former sport | Ref |
|---|---|---|---|---|
| Adelaide | Taylah Levy | Cleveland State | Basketball | |
| Brisbane | Jennifer Dunne | Dublin GAA | Ladies' Gaelic football | |
| Brisbane | Courtney Murphy | Long Beach State | Basketball | |
| Carlton | Dayna Finn | Mayo GAA | Ladies' Gaelic football | |
| Carlton | Erone Fitzpatrick | Laois GAA | Ladies' Gaelic football | |
| Geelong | Anna-Rose Kennedy | Tipperary GAA | Ladies' Gaelic football | |
| Geelong | Aishling Moloney | Tipperary GAA | Ladies' Gaelic football | |
| Gold Coast | Niamh McLaughlin | Donegal GAA | Ladies' Gaelic football | |
| Hawthorn | Casey Dumont | Melbourne Victory | Soccer | |
| Melbourne | Aimee Mackin | Armagh GAA | Ladies' Gaelic football | |
| North Melbourne | Niamh Martin | Tipperary GAA | Ladies' Gaelic football | |
| Sydney | Jennifer Higgins | Roscommon GAA | Ladies' Gaelic football | |
| Sydney | Paris McCarthy | East Tennessee State & Kerry GAA | Basketball & Ladies' Gaelic football | |
| Sydney | Julie O'Sullivan | Kerry GAA | Ladies' Gaelic football | |

=== Trades ===
Table of trades
| Clubs involved | Trade | | Ref |
|---|---|---|---|
| Collingwood North Melbourne St Kilda | to St Kilda (from Collingwood): Steph Chiocci; Jaimee Lambert; pick #31 | to Collingwood (from St Kilda): Tarni White | |
| Collingwood North Melbourne St Kilda | to North Melbourne (from St Kilda): Kate Shierlaw | to Collingwood (from North Melbourne): Grace Campbell; pick #15 | |
| Essendon Richmond | to Essendon (from Richmond): Kodi Jacques | to Richmond (from Essendon): pick #27 | |
| St Kilda Richmond Carlton | to Richmond (from St Kilda): Caitlin Greiser | to St Kilda (from Carlton): Natalie Plane | |
| St Kilda Richmond Carlton | to Carlton (from Richmond): Harriet Cordner | to St Kilda (from Richmond): pick #14 | |
| Gold Coast Richmond | to Gold Coast (from Richmond): Maddy Brancatisano | to Richmond (from Gold Coast): Courtney Jones | |
| Carlton Fremantle | to Carlton (from Fremantle): Tahlia Read | to Fremantle (from Carlton): Serena Gibbs | |
| Geelong Port Adelaide | to Geelong (from Port Adelaide): Kate Surman | to Port Adelaide (from Geelong): Maddy Keryk; pick #12 | |
| Hawthorn North Melbourne | to North Melbourne (from Hawthorn): Eliza Shannon; pick #40 | to Hawthorn (from North Melbourne): pick #33 | |
| Richmond Sydney | to Richmond (from Sydney): Molly Eastman | to Sydney (from Richmond): pick #27 | |
| North Melbourne St Kilda Collingwood Gold Coast Brisbane | to North Melbourne: Lulu Pullar (from Brisbane); pick #31 (from St Kilda); to St Kilda: Jesse Wardlaw (from Brisbane); Serene Watson (from Gold Coast); to Collingwood: pick #14 (from St Kilda) | to Gold Coast: Jordan Membrey (from Collingwood); Clara Fitzpatrick (from St Kilda); Ella Maurer (from North Melbourne); pick #6 (from St Kilda); to Brisbane: Ellie Hampson (from Gold Coast); pick #40 (from North Melbourne) | |
| Essendon Carlton | to Essendon (from Carlton): Brooke Walker | to Carlton (from Essendon): pick #9 | |
| West Coast Fremantle | to West Coast (from Fremantle): Amy Franklin | to Fremantle (from West Coast): pick #3; pick #21 | |
| Sydney Geelong | to Sydney (from Geelong): Laura Gardiner | to Geelong (from Sydney): pick #1 | |
| Adelaide Port Adelaide | to Adelaide (from Port Adelaide): Sarah Goodwin | to Port Adelaide (from Adelaide): Jasmine Simmons; pick #16; pick #34 | |
| Adelaide Greater Western Sydney | to Adelaide (from Greater Western Sydney): Jessica Allan | to Greater Western Sydney (from Adelaide): pick #52 | |
| Collingwood Western Bulldogs | to Collingwood (from Western Bulldogs): Nell Morris-Dalton | to Western Bulldogs (from Collingwood): pick #15 | |

=== Delisted free agency ===
Table of free agency signings
| Date | Player | Former club | New club | Ref |
|---|---|---|---|---|
| 22 March | Leah Cutting | St Kilda | Essendon | |
| 22 March | Georgia Clarke | Geelong | Essendon | |
| 22 March | Hayley Bullas | West Coast | Sydney | |
| 22 March | Jade Pregelj | Gold Coast | Brisbane | |
| 22 March | Liz McGrath | Port Adelaide | North Melbourne | |
| 22 March | Georgie Fowler | Greater Western Sydney | Melbourne | |

=== Inactive players ===
Table of inactive players
| Club | Player | Reason | Ref |
|---|---|---|---|
| Adelaide | Hannah Button | Knee | |
| Adelaide | McKenzie Dowrick | Knee | |
| Brisbane | Kate Lutkins | Pregnancy | |
| Brisbane | Luka Yoshida-Martin | Knee | |
| Brisbane | Zimmorlei Farquharson | Personal | |
| Carlton | Maddy Guerin | Knee | |
| Carlton | Lulu Beatty | Leg | |
| Essendon | Cat Phillips | Pregnancy | |
| Fremantle | Mikayla Morrison | Knee | |
| Gold Coast | Kaylee Kimber | Foot | |
| Gold Coast | Maddison Levi | Rugby | |
| Gold Coast | Teagan Levi | Rugby | |
| Gold Coast | Claire Ransom | Personal | |
| Greater Western Sydney | Tait Mackrill | Knee | |
| Greater Western Sydney | Meghan Gaffney | Knee | |
| North Melbourne | Zoe Savarirayan | Knee | |
| North Melbourne | Vicki Wall | Rugby | |
| Port Adelaide | Jacqui Yorston | Wellbeing | |
| Richmond | Tessa Lavey | Foot | |
| Richmond | Stephanie Williams | Personal | |
| St Kilda | Jade Van Dyk | Knee | |
| Sydney | Hayley Bullas | Knee | |
| Sydney | Maddy Collier | Knee | |
| West Coast | Krstel Petrevski | Ankle | |
