= 2021 AFL Women's draft =

Ninth women's draft organised by the Australian Football League

General information
- Date: 27 July 2021
- Time: 7:00pm AEST
- Sponsored by: NAB

Overview
- League: AFL Women's
- First selection: Charlie Rowbottom (Gold Coast)

The 2021 AFL Women's draft consists of the various periods when the 14 clubs in the AFL Women's competition can recruit players prior to the competition's 2022 season 6.

== Special assistance ==
In May 2021, just before the draft period began, the AFL Commission approved special draft and signing assistance to the Gold Coast, Geelong, West Coast, St Kilda and Richmond to support the strengthening of their playing lists in line with the competition's leading clubs. As a condition of receiving assistance, the clubs were required to use at least five selections at the upcoming draft.

Table of special assistance
Club	Measure	Pick number/Player name	Notes	Ref
Gold Coast	First round pick	Pick 6		
Gold Coast	First round pick	Pick 8		
Gold Coast	Mature age signing	Unused		
Gold Coast	Mature age signing	Unused		
Geelong	First round pick	Pick 7		
Geelong	First round pick	Pick 9		
Geelong	Mature age signing	Claudia Gunjaca		
Geelong	Mature age signing	Olivia Fuller		
West Coast	Second round pick	Pick 24		
West Coast	Third round pick	Pick 41		
St Kilda	Second round pick	Pick 25	Traded to Western Bulldogs	
Richmond	Second round pick	Pick 26	Traded to Carlton and on to Collingwood	

== Signing and trading period ==
Players can be signed for one or two year contracts. The trade period opened on 31 May 2021 and will close on 9 June 2021. Players can be re-signed until 16 June 2021.

=== Retirements and delistings ===
Table of player retirements and delistings
Date	Name	Club	Status	Ref
25 March	Aasta O'Connor	Geelong	Retired	
28 March	Alison Downie	Carlton	Delisted	
28 March	Katie Loynes	Carlton	Delisted	
29 March	Sally Riley	Gold Coast	Retired	
31 March	Alison Brown	St Kilda	Delisted	
31 March	Selena Karlson	St Kilda	Retired	
31 March	Tamara Luke	St Kilda	Delisted	
31 March	Nadia von Bertouch	St Kilda	Delisted	
5 April	Emily Harley	Richmond	Delisted	
5 April	Luka Lesosky-Hay	Richmond	Delisted	
5 April	Cleo Saxon-Jones	Richmond	Delisted	
5 April	Holly Whitford	Richmond	Delisted	
7 April	Maddie Boyd	Geelong	Delisted	
7 April	Nicole Garner	Geelong	Delisted	
7 April	Mia Skinner	Geelong	Delisted	
9 April	Leah Mascall	Fremantle	Retired	
9 April	Jessica Edwards	Carlton	Delisted	
12 April	Sam Virgo	Gold Coast	Retired	
14 April	Sharni Norder	Collingwood	Retired	
16 April	Kristy Stratton	Collingwood	Delisted	
16 April	Niamh McEvoy	Melbourne	Retired	
16 April	Shae Sloane	Melbourne	Retired	
16 April	Tarnee Tester	Fremantle	Delisted	
16 April	Jess Trend	Fremantle	Delisted	
16 April	Alex Williams	Fremantle	Delisted	
18 April	Emma Zielke	Brisbane	Retired	
19 April	Lauren Arnell	Brisbane	Retired	
22 April	Jessy Keeffe	Brisbane	Retired	
28 April	Georgia Bevan	Gold Coast	Delisted	
28 April	Jordann Hickey	Gold Coast	Delisted	
28 April	Molly Ritson	Gold Coast	Delisted	
30 April	Katelyn Cox	North Melbourne	Delisted	
30 April	Georgia Hammond	North Melbourne	Delisted	
13 May	Renee Forth	Adelaide	Delisted	
2 June	Amelia van Oosterwijck	Western Bulldogs	Retired	
4 June	Leah Kaslar	Gold Coast	Delisted	
7 June	Alice Edmonds	Richmond	Delisted	
7 June	Beth Lynch	North Melbourne	Delisted	
7 June	Tahni Nestor	North Melbourne	Delisted	
8 June	Meg Downie	Melbourne	Retired	
8 June	Winnie Laing	Carlton	Delisted	
8 June	Paige Parker	Gold Coast	Delisted	
8 June	Phoebe Monahan	Richmond	Delisted	
8 June	Alana Woodward	Richmond	Delisted	
9 June	Alicia Janz	West Coast	Delisted	
9 June	Beatrice Devlyn	West Coast	Delisted	
9 June	Brianna Green	West Coast	Delisted	
9 June	Demi Liddle	West Coast	Delisted	
9 June	Julie-Anne Norrish	West Coast	Delisted	
9 June	Kate Orme	West Coast	Delisted	
9 June	Katelyn Pope	West Coast	Delisted	
9 June	Mhicca Carter	West Coast	Delisted	
9 June	Tegan Cunningham	Melbourne	Retired	
9 June	Mietta Kendell	Melbourne	Delisted	
9 June	Akec Makur Chuot	Richmond	Delisted	
9 June	Richelle Cranston	Geelong	Delisted	
9 June	Kate Darby	Geelong	Delisted	
9 June	Rebecca Goring	Geelong	Delisted	
9 June	Kate Gillespie-Jones	North Melbourne	Delisted	
9 June	Beth Pinchin	Brisbane	Delisted	
9 June	Selina Priest	Brisbane	Delisted	
9 June	Jordan Zanchetta	Brisbane	Delisted	
9 June	Sarah Halvorsen	Greater Western Sydney	Delisted	
9 June	Jodie Hicks	Greater Western Sydney	Delisted	
9 June	Erin Todd	Greater Western Sydney	Delisted	
9 June	Britt Tully	Greater Western Sydney	Delisted	
10 June	Abbey Green	Collingwood	Retired	
10 June	Rheanne Lugg	Brisbane	Retired	
10 June	Lauren Spark	Western Bulldogs	Retired	
14 June	Chantella Perera	West Coast	Delisted	
16 June	McKenzie Dowrick	West Coast	Delisted	
16 June	Katie-Jayne Grieve	Fremantle	Delisted	
16 June	Angelica Gogos	Western Bulldogs	Retired	
16 June	Danielle Marshall	Western Bulldogs	Delisted	
16 June	Kim Rennie	Western Bulldogs	Delisted	
16 June	Katy Herron	Western Bulldogs	Delisted	
16 June	Taylah Davies	Greater Western Sydney	Delisted	
29 June	Clara Fitzpatrick	St Kilda	Delisted	

=== Trades ===
Table of trades
Clubs involved	Trade		Ref
Collingwood Richmond	to Collingwood (from Richmond): Sabrina Frederick; pick #26; pick #55	to Richmond (from Collingwood): Maddie Shevlin; pick #16; pick #48	
St Kilda Richmond	to Richmond (from St Kilda): Poppy Kelly	to St Kilda (from Richmond): Pick #48	
Western Bulldogs Greater Western Sydney	to Western Bulldogs (from Greater Western Sydney): Elle Bennetts	to Greater Western Sydney (from Western Bulldogs): Pick #28	
Melbourne Geelong	to Melbourne (from Geelong): Olivia Purcell; Pick #37	to Geelong (from Melbourne): Chantel Emonson; Pick #15	
Geelong Adelaide	to Geelong (from Adelaide): Chloe Scheer	to Adelaide (from Geelong): Pick #20	
Adelaide Melbourne	to Adelaide (from Melbourne): Pick #47	to Melbourne (from Adelaide): Pick #49	
Carlton Greater Western Sydney	to Carlton (from Greater Western Sydney): Jessica Dal Pos; Pick #10; Pick #27	to Greater Western Sydney (from Carlton): Chloe Dalton; Katie Loynes	
Melbourne Greater Western Sydney	to Melbourne (from Greater Western Sydney): Pick #42	to Greater Western Sydney (from Melbourne): Pick #37	
Melbourne Carlton	to Melbourne (from Carlton): Tayla Harris; Pick #44	to Carlton (from Melbourne): Pick #32	
Gold Coast St Kilda	to Gold Coast (from St Kilda): Claudia Whitfort	to St Kilda (from Gold Coast): Pick #36	
Carlton Collingwood	to Carlton (from Collingwood): Pick #26; Pick #55	to Collingwood (from Carlton): Pick #29; Pick #32	
Carlton Western Bulldogs	to Carlton (from Western Bulldogs): Pick #11; Pick #57	to Western Bulldogs (from Carlton): Pick #12; Pick #27	
St Kilda Western Bulldogs	to St Kilda (from Western Bulldogs): Pick #12	to Western Bulldogs (from St Kilda): Pick #22; Pick #25	
Greater Western Sydney North Melbourne	to Greater Western Sydney (from North Melbourne): Jasmine Grierson	to North Melbourne (from Greater Western Sydney): Pick #28	
West Coast Fremantle	to West Coast (from Fremantle): Evangeline Gooch	to Fremantle (from West Coast): Pick #38	
Richmond Carlton	to Richmond (from Carlton): Jess Hosking; Pick #55; Pick #57	to Carlton (from Richmond): Pick #23; Pick #40	
Gold Coast North Melbourne	to Gold Coast (from North Melbourne): Vivien Saad; Pick #30	to North Melbourne (from Gold Coast): Pick #19	

=== Delisted free agency ===
The delisted free agency period will close on 25 June 2021.

Table of free agency signings
Date	Player	Former club	New club	Ref
9 June	Aimee Schmidt	Greater Western Sydney	West Coast	
10 June	Alison Downie	Carlton	Collingwood	
15 June	Alana Woodward	Richmond	St Kilda	
18 June	Richelle Cranston	Geelong	Western Bulldogs	
18 June	Phoebe Monahan	Richmond	Brisbane	
25 June	Jasmyn Hewett	Gold Coast	Adelaide	

=== Rookie signings ===
In the absence of a rookie draft, each club was permitted to sign players that had not played Australian rules football within the previous three years or been involved in an AFLW high-performance program.

Table of rookie signings
Club	Player	Other/former sport	Ref
Adelaide	Jasmine Simmons	Basketball	
Geelong	Rachel Kearns	Gaelic football	
Melbourne	Eliza West	Basketball	
St Kilda	Paige Price	Basketball	

=== Inactive players ===
Following final list lodgements, a number of players experienced changing circumstances that made them unable to participate in 2022 season 6. Clubs were granted permission to place these players on an inactive list, gaining end of draft selections to replace them for the one season. Players on each club's inactive list ahead of 2022 season 6 are listed below:

Table of inactive players
Club	Player	Reason	Ref
Adelaide	Jess Sedunary	Olympics	
Adelaide	Ange Foley	Injury	
Adelaide	Rhiannon Metcalfe	Work commitments	
Adelaide	Deni Varnhagen	Unvaccinated	
Brisbane	Lily Postlethwaite	Knee	
Carlton	Serena Gibbs	Mental health	
Collingwood	Jordan Membrey	Knee	
Collingwood	Joanna Lin	Shoulder	
Fremantle	Sabreena Duffy	Work commitments	
Fremantle	Ashley Sharp	Pregnancy	
Geelong	Denby Taylor	Personal break	
Geelong	Millie Brown	Personal break	
Geelong	Renee Garing	Pregnancy	
Gold Coast	Annise Bradfield	Knee	
Gold Coast	Emma Pittman	Work commitments	
Gold Coast	Maddison Levi	Rugby	
Gold Coast	Teagan Levi	Rugby	
Greater Western Sydney	Jessica Allan	Army	
Greater Western Sydney	Yvonne Bonner	Pregnancy	
Greater Western Sydney	Emily Goodsir	Pregnancy	
Greater Western Sydney	Isadora McLeay	Knee	
Melbourne	Isabella Simmons	Foot	
North Melbourne	Elisha King	Knee	
Richmond	Iilish Ross	Lower leg	
Richmond	Hannah McLaren	Illness	
St Kilda	Paige Price	Hip	
St Kilda	Tyanna Smith	Knee	
Western Bulldogs	Gabby Newton	Shoulder	
Western Bulldogs	Kirsten McLeod	Concussion	

== Draft ==
Table of draft selections
Rd.	Pick	Player	Club	Recruited from		Notes
Rd.	Pick	Player	Club	Club	League	Notes
1	1	Charlie Rowbottom	Gold Coast	Oakleigh Chargers	NAB League Girls	
1	2	Georgie Prespakis	Geelong	Calder Cannons	NAB League Girls	
1	3	Charlie Thomas	West Coast	Subiaco Lions	WAFL Women's	
1	4	Ella Friend	St Kilda	Greater Western Victoria Rebels	NAB League Girls	
1	5	Stella Reid	Richmond	Oakleigh Chargers	NAB League Girls	
1	6	Teagan Levi	Gold Coast	Bond University Football Club	AFL Queensland Women's League	
1	7	Zali Friswell	Geelong	Calder Cannons	NAB League Girls	
1	8	Ashanti Bush	Gold Coast	Darwin Football Club	Northern Territory Football League	
1	9	Gabbi Featherston	Geelong	Geelong Falcons	NAB League Girls	
1	10	Annie Lee	Carlton	Geelong Falcons	NAB League Girls	←Greater Western Sydney
1	11	Keeley Sherar	Carlton	Eastern Ranges	NAB League Girls	←Western Bulldogs
1	12	Ashleigh Richards	St Kilda	Dandenong Stingrays	NAB League Girls	←Western Bulldogs←Carlton
1	13	Tess Craven	North Melbourne	Geelong Falcons	NAB League Girls	
1	14	Amy Franklin	Fremantle	Claremont Football Club	WAFL Women's	
1	15	Annabel Johnson	Geelong	Geelong VFLW	VFL Women's	←Melbourne
1	16	Emilia Yassir	Richmond	Calder Cannons	NAB League Girls	←Collingwood
1	17	Zoe Prowse	Adelaide	Sturt Football Club	SANFL Women's	
1	18	Maggie Harmer	Brisbane	Maroochydore Football Club	AFL Queensland Women's League	
2	19	Tara Slender	North Melbourne	Bendigo Pioneers	NAB League Girls	←Gold Coast
2	20	Brooke Tonon	Adelaide	Glenelg	SANFL Women's	←Geelong
2	21	Courtney Rowley	West Coast	Peel Thunder	WAFL Women's	
2	22	Amanda Ling	Western Bulldogs	Oakleigh Chargers	NAB League Girls	←St Kilda
2	23	Brooke Vickers	Carlton	Oakleigh Chargers	NAB League Girls	←Richmond
2	24	Beth Schilling	West Coast	Peel Thunder	WAFL Women's	
2	25	Aurora Smith	Western Bulldogs	Murray Bushrangers	NAB League Girls	←St Kilda
2	26	Imogen Milford	Carlton	Casey Demons	VFL Women's	←Collingwood←Richmond
2	27	Elizabeth Snell	Western Bulldogs	Bendigo Pioneers	NAB League Girls	←Carlton←Greater Western Sydney
2	28	Kim Rennie	North Melbourne	Western Bulldogs	AFL Women's	←Greater Western Sydney←Western Bulldogs
2	29	Eliza James	Collingwood	Oakleigh Chargers	NAB League Girls	←Carlton
2	30	Giselle Davies	Gold Coast	Bond University Football Club	AFL Queensland Women's League	←North Melbourne
2	31	Dana East	Fremantle	Swan Districts Football Club	WAFL Women's	
2	32	Eloise Chaston	Collingwood	Eastern Ranges	NAB League Girls	←Carlton←Melbourne
2	33	Imogen Barnett	Collingwood	Collingwood	VFL Women's	
2	34	Abbie Ballard	Adelaide	West Adelaide	SANFL Women's	
2	35	Bella Smith	Brisbane	Maroochydore Football Club	AFL Queensland Women's League	
3	36	Pass	St Kilda			←Gold Coast
3	37	Ally Morphett	Greater Western Sydney	Murray Bushrangers	NAB League Girls	←Melbourne←Geelong
3	38	Makaela Tuhakaraina	Fremantle	South Fremantle Football Club	WAFL Women's	West Coast
3	39	Pass	Carlton			
3	40	Sarah Lakay	West Coast	Swan Districts Football Club	WAFL Women's	←Greater Western Sydney
3	41	Georgia Campbell	Melbourne	Eastern Ranges	NAB League Girls	←Greater Western Sydney
3	42	Tahlia Gillard	Melbourne	Calder Cannons	NAB League Girls	←Carlton
3	43	Perri King	North Melbourne	Glenorchy Football Club	Tasmanian Football League	
3	44	Airlie Runnalls	Fremantle	North Melbourne	VFL Women's	←Greater Western Sydney
3	45	Alison Brown	Melbourne	Casey Demons	VFL Women's	←Adelaide
3	46	Mikayla Pauga	Brisbane	Bond University Football Club	AFL Queensland Women's League	
4	47	Emily Bennett	West Coast	Claremont Football Club	WAFL Women's	←Melbourne
4	48	Meagan Kiely	Richmond	North Melbourne	VFL Women's	←Carlton←Collingwood
4	49	Jessica Doyle	Greater Western Sydney	Manly Warringah	AFL Sydney	←Adelaide
4	50	Ingrid Houtsma	Richmond	Geelong Falcons	NAB League Girls	←Carlton←Western Bulldogs
4	51	Jasmine Ferguson	North Melbourne	Collingwood	VFL Women's	
4	52	Jessica Low	Fremantle	Claremont Football Club	WAFL Women's	
4	53	Luka Yoshida-Martin	Brisbane	University of Queensland	AFL Queensland Women's League	
5	54	Akec Makur Chuot	Richmond	Richmond	AFL Women's	
5	55	Brodee Mowbray	Greater Western Sydney	Sutherland AFC	AFL Sydney	
5	56	Ella Maurer	North Melbourne	North Melbourne	VFL Women's	
5	57	Sarah Wielstra	Fremantle	Swan Districts Football Club	WAFL Women's	
5	58	Lucinda Pullar	Brisbane	Bond University Football Club	AFL Queensland Women's League	
6	59	Georgina Fowler	Greater Western Sydney	East Coast Eagles	AFL Sydney	
7	60	Casidhe Simmons	Greater Western Sydney	UNSW-Eastern Suburbs Bulldogs	AFL Sydney	
8	61	Erin Todd	Greater Western Sydney	Western Suburbs Magpies AFC	AFL Sydney	

=== Free agency and replacement signings ===
Where players were moved to inactive list after the draft had taken place, club were entitled to replace them by free agency signing.

Free agent or replacement signings
Club	Player	Reason	Former club	Former league	Ref
Adelaide	McKenzie Dowrick	Replacement (Varnhagen)	Woodville-West Torrens	SANFLW	
Carlton	Jess Good	Free agent	Glenelg	SANFLW	
Carlton	Poppy Schaap	Replacement (Gibbs)	Geelong Falcons	NAB League Girls	
Collingwood	Olivia Meagher	Replacement (Lin)	Collingwood	VFL Women's	
Gold Coast	Alana Barba	Replacement (Pittman)	Essendon	VFL Women's	
Gold Coast	Tara Bohanna	Replacement (Bradfield)	Southern Saints	VFL Women's	
Gold Coast	Shannon Danckert	Replacement (M. Levi)	Bond University	QWAFL	
Gold Coast	Jacqueline Dupuy	Replacement (T. Levi)	Maroochydore	QWAFL	
Greater Western Sydney	Isadora McLeay	Replacement (Goodsir)	North Shore	AFL Sydney	
Greater Western Sydney	Ally Dallaway	Replacement (McLeay)	East Coast Eagles	AFL Sydney	
Melbourne	Maeve Chaplin	Replacement (Simmons)	Northern Knights	NAB League	
North Melbourne	Lexi Hamilton	Replacement (King)	North Melbourne	VFL Women's	
Richmond	Beth Lynch	Replacement (Ross)	North Melbourne	AFL Women's	
Richmond	Meg Macdonald	Replacement (McLaren)	Casey	VFL Women's	
St Kilda	Leah Cutting	Free agent	Norwood	SANFLW	
St Kilda	Lucy Burke	Replacement (Price)	Southern Saints	VFL Women's	
Western Bulldogs	Alice Edmonds	Replacement (Newton)	Richmond	AFL Women's	
Western Bulldogs	Jemima Woods	Replacement (McLeod)	Western Bulldogs	VFL Women's	

=== Train on players ===
Where multiple players were ruled unable to play due to COVID-19 related health and safety protocols, clubs were entitled to field up to five train on players to enable them to field a full side.

Train on players
Club	Player	Former club	Former league	Ref
Fremantle	Mikayla Western	Peel Thunder	WAFLW	

== See also ==
- 2021 AFL draft
