= 2021 AFL Women's Under-19 Championships =

AFL Women's Under-19 Championships
- 2021

Tournament information
- Sport: Australian rules football
- Dates: 12 April–29 May
- Venue: Various
- MVP: Ella Roberts (Western Australia)

The 2021 NAB AFL Women's Under-19 Championships is the eleventh national under-18/19 girls Australian rules football competition. The tournament, which was previously held in 2019 and not in 2020 due to the COVID-19 pandemic, was played in April and May and featured eight teams. Due to the pandemic, no winner was declared; instead, a series of challenge matches were played.

== Age eligibility ==
The tournament is usually an under-18s competition; however, due to no championships being staged in 2020 due to the impact of the COVID-19 pandemic, the 2021 edition was increased to an under-19 level.

== Format and teams ==
Eight teams competed in the championships: Vic Metro, Vic Country, South Australia, Western Australia, Queensland, the Allies (representing the Northern Territory, Tasmania, New South Wales and the Australian Capital Territory), the Woomeras (an Indigenous under-17 representative program), and the Medleys (a multicultural under-17 representative program). The tournament was originally scheduled to begin in March, and two matches were played; however, due to travel restrictions imposed as a result of a spike of COVID-19 cases in Brisbane, these matches were regarded as "challenge" matches and did not contribute to the overall rankings of the championships. When only the official matches are included, each team only played two matches against randomly scheduled opponents.

== Fixtures ==
| | Fixtures |
| Monday, 12 April (10:00 am) | South Australia 3.3 (21) | def. by | Vic Country 5.6 (36) | Avalon Airport Oval |
| Monday, 12 April (12:15 pm) | Woomeras 6.6 (42) | def. | Medleys 5.4 (34) | Avalon Airport Oval |
| Monday, 12 April (2:30 pm) | Western Australia 9.7 (61) | def. | Allies 4.4 (28) | Avalon Airport Oval |
| Thursday, 15 April (10:00 am) | Vic Metro 4.13 (37) | def. | Western Australia 4.9 (33) | Trevor Barker Beach Oval |
| Thursday, 15 April (12:15 pm) | Allies 3.8 (26) | def. | South Australia 3.2 (20) | Trevor Barker Beach Oval |
| Thursday, 15 April (2:30 pm) | Woomeras 3.9 (27) | def. by | Medleys 4.4 (28) | Trevor Barker Beach Oval |
| Sunday, 23 May (12:15 pm) | Vic Country 12.4 (76) | def. | Queensland 3.4 (22) | North Port Oval |
| Saturday, 29 May (12:15 pm) | Queensland | v | Vic Metro | CANCELLED |

== All-Australian team ==
The 2021 Women's Under-19 All-Australian team was selected by a panel of experts, including AFL chair Kevin Sheehan, Tarkyn Lockyer (AFL national talent head coach), Samantha Virgo (Gold Coast), Trent Moseby (Richmond), Todd Patterson (Melbourne) and Jess Smith (AFL National Female Talent Manager).

2019 Under-18 Women's All-Australian team
| B: | Chloe Leonard (VC) | Isadora McLeay (NSW/ACT) | Jaide Anthony (VC) |
| HB: | Maggie Harmer (Qld) | Lauren Young (SA) | Annie Lee (VC) |
| C: | Aurora Smith (VC) | Teagan Levi (Qld) | Courtney Rowley (WA) |
| HF: | Jess Doyle (NSW/ACT) | Ella Roberts (WA) (MVP) | Stella Reid (VM) |
| F: | Paige Scott (VC) | Cynthia Hamilton (NSW/ACT) | Georgia Campbell (VM) |
| Foll: | Zoe Prowse (SA) | Charlie Rowbottom (VM) | Georgie Prespakis (VM) |
| Int: | Makaela Tuhakaraina (WA) | Tahlia Gillard (VM) | Tara Slender (VC) |
| Int: | Zoe Venning (SA) | | |
| Coach: | Melissa Hickey (VC) | | |

== Team MVPs ==
At the conclusion of the tournament each competing team named their best player for the tournament. The winner of these 'most valuable player' awards are as follows:

| Team | Player |
|---|---|
| Allies | Cynthia Hamilton |
| Queensland | Abby Hewitt |
| South Australia | Lauren Young |
| Vic Metro | Georgie Prespakis |
| Vic Country | Jaide Anthony |
| Western Australia | Ella Roberts |
