= Abbie Ballard =

Personal information
- Born: 16 April 2002 (age 24)
- Original teams: West Adelaide (SANFL); Strathalbyn (GSFL); Peake & District (MFL)
- Draft: No. 34, 2021 draft
- Debut: Round 3, 2022 ^{(S6)}, Adelaide vs. West Coast, at Punt Road Oval
- Height: 160 cm (5 ft 3 in)
- Position: Medium forward

Playing career^{1}
Years	Club	Games (Goals)
2022^{(S6)}–2025	Adelaide	28 (8)
- ^{1} Playing statistics correct to the end of 2025.

Abbie Ballard (born 16 April 2002) is a former professional Australian rules football player who played for the Adelaide Crows in the AFL Women's (AFLW). She was drafted to Adelaide with the 34th pick in the 2021 AFL Women's draft, and was delisted following the 2025 AFL Women's season.

== Early career ==
Living in Coomandook, a town southeast of Adelaide, South Australia, Ballard played for Peake & District Football Club in the Mallee Football League in her junior football career.

Ballard, signed by the West Adelaide Football Club in the SANFL Women's League (SANFLW) won the club's best and fairest award in 2019, two years after making her league debut at only 15 years of age. The Bloods' vice-captain was named as the sole captain in the 2021 SANFLW Grand Final.

== AFL Women's career ==
Ballard made her debut for Adelaide in round three of AFLW season 6. She kicked two goals in a career-best performance against Richmond the following season.

In a 2023 match against Western Bulldogs at Norwood Oval, Ballard left the ground injured. Scans later confirmed that she had torn her ACL, ruling her out of the remainder of the season. Ballard returned from injury in 2024 and featured in finals against Fremantle and Brisbane.

Ballard did not appear for Adelaide in 2025 and was subsequently delisted by the club following their semi-final exit at the conclusion of the season. She played 28 games for the club across five seasons.
