= Jemima Woods =

Australian rules footballer

Personal information
- Full name: Jemima Woods
- Born: 28 May 2003 (age 23)
- Original team: Western Jets (NAB League Girls)
- Debut: Round 4, 2022 (S6), Western Bulldogs vs. Fremantle, at Whitten Oval
- Height: 174 cm (5 ft 9 in)
- Position: Medium Forward

Club information
- Current club: Richmond
- Number: 29

Playing career^{1}
Years	Club	Games (Goals)
2022 (S6)	Western Bulldogs	2 (0)
2022 (S7)–	Richmond	12 (0)
Total		14 (0)
- ^{1} Playing statistics correct to the end of the 2023 season.

Jemima Woods (born 28 May 2003) is an Australian rules footballer playing for the Richmond Football Club in the AFL Women's (AFLW).

Graham was signed by the Western Bulldogs in January 2022 as a replacement for Kirsten McLeod who was moved to the inactive list.

She made her debut against Fremantle at the Whitten Oval in the fourth round of 2022 season 6.

She was delisted by the Western Bulldogs and subsequently signed by Richmond as a delisted free agent.

She made her debut for Richmond against Brisbane at Punt Road Oval in the fifth round of 2022 AFL Women's season 7.

== Statistics ==
Statistics are correct to end of 2022 season 7

Legend
G	Goals	K	Kicks	D	Disposals	T	Tackles
B	Behinds	H	Handballs	M	Marks

Season	Team	No.	Games	Totals							Averages (per game)						
Season	Team	No.	Games	G	B	K	H	D	M	T	G	B	K	H	D	M	T
2022 (S6)	Western Bulldogs	28	3	0	0	1	1	2	0	5	0.0	0.0	0.5	0.5	1.0	0.0	2.5
2022 (S7)	Richmond	29	5	0	1	9	7	16	2	2	0.0	0.0	1.8	1.4	3.2	0.4	0.4
Career			7	0	1	10	8	18	2	7	0.0	0.1	1.4	1.1	2.6	0.3	1.0
