= Charlie Rowbottom =

Australian rules footballer

- Rowbottom in 2026

Personal information
- Born: 22 January 2003 (age 23); Melbourne, Victoria
- Original team: Oakleigh Chargers (NAB League Girls)
- Draft: No. 1, 2021 draft
- Debut: Round 1, 2022 (S6), Gold Coast vs. Greater Western Sydney, at Great Barrier Reef Arena
- Height: 180 cm (5 ft 11 in)
- Position: Midfielder

Club information
- Current club: Gold Coast
- Number: 8

Playing career^{1}
Years	Club	Games (Goals)
2022 (S6)–	Gold Coast	51 (4)
- ^{1} Playing statistics correct to the end of 2025.

Career highlights
- 2× AFL Women's All-Australian team: 2023, 2024; 4× Gold Coast Club Champion: 2022 (S7), 2024, 2025, 2026; 5× 22under22 team: 2022 (S6), 2022 (S7), 2023, 2024, 2025; AFLWPA Best First Year Player: 2022 (S6); Under-19 All-Australian: 2021

Charlie Rowbottom (born 22 January 2003) is an Australian rules footballer playing for Gold Coast in the AFL Women's (AFLW).

== Early life ==
Rowbottom grew up in Melbourne and first played Australian rules football in year eight at Loreto Mandeville Hall. She proceeded to play junior football for the East Malvern Knights of the South Metro Junior Football League, and shortly thereafter accepted a position in the Oakleigh Chargers girls teams. She is the younger sister of professional men's footballer James Rowbottom, who plays for the Sydney Swans. Her uncle is former AFL player and current Channel 7 AFL commentator Brian Taylor.

== Football career ==
Under the rules of the AFL Women's draft in 2021, Rowbottom was permitted to nominate the state of her choice for selection by an AFLW club. Despite growing up in Victoria, Rowbottom nominated Queensland, stating that although it would be "a shift in my life, it is all very exciting". Gold Coast had the first overall pick in the draft, and so selected Rowbottom with the number one pick. She played her debut match in round one of 2022 season 6 against Greater Western Sydney, and recorded 11 disposals. The following round she was nominated for the AFL Women's Rising Star award, in the Suns' 13-point win against West Coast. She missed out on winning the Rising Star award by one vote to Carlton's Mimi Hill, though she did win the equivalent award as judged by her peers at the Players Association MVP Awards.

Rowbottom won the Gold Coast Club Champion award the following season as her club's best and fairest player. She missed her chance at her first finals appearance when she underwent ankle surgery late in the 2023 season, though her third campaign was successful enough to earn Rowbottom her maiden selection in the 2023 All-Australian team.

In week 3 of 2024, Rowbottom set a new personal record of 42 disposals in a draw against Greater Western Sydney. Fresh off of her second All-Australian selection at just the age of 21 in 2024, Rowbottom re-committed to the Suns, signing a two-year contract extension. She also won her second Club Champion award.

Following a 2025 season in which Gold Coast claimed the wooden spoon, Rowbottom won her third best-and-fairest.
