= Brooke Tonon =

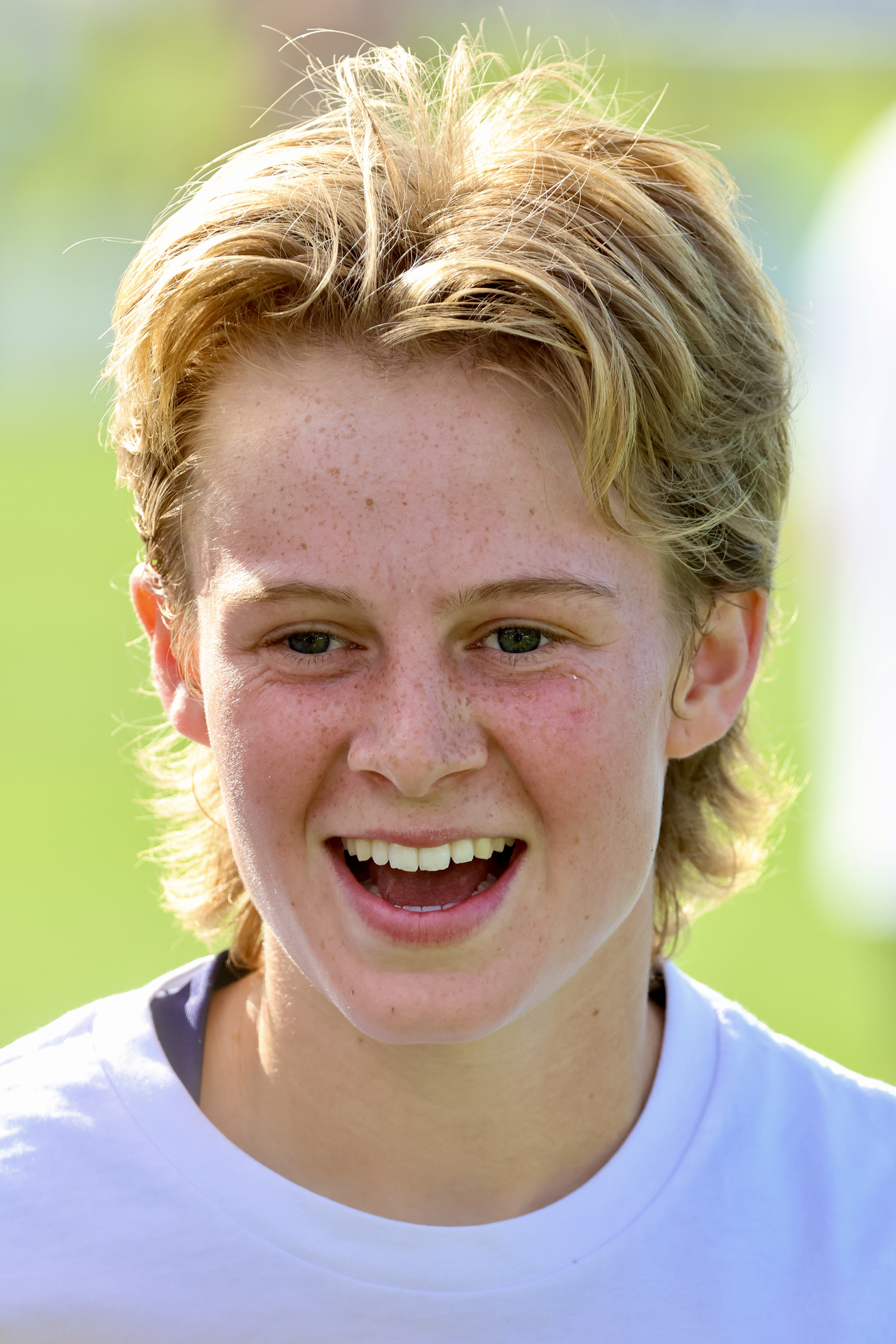
- Tonon in 2026

Personal information
- Nickname: Chook
- Born: 19 September 2003 (age 23); Mount Gambier, South Australia
- Original teams: Glenelg (SANFLW); Mitcham Hawks (Adelaide Footy League)
- Draft: No. 20, 2021 draft
- Debut: Round 7, 2022 ^{(S6)}, Adelaide vs. Greater Western Sydney, at Henson Park
- Height: 166 cm (5 ft 5 in)
- Position: Defender/winger

Club information
- Current club: Adelaide
- Number: 29

Playing career^{1}
Years	Club	Games (Goals)
2022 ^{(S6)}–	Adelaide	29 (2)
- ^{1} Playing statistics correct to the end of 2024.

Brooke Tonon (born 19 September 2003) is a professional Australian rules football player who currently plays for the Adelaide Crows in the AFL Women's (AFLW). She originally played for Glenelg in the SANFL Women's League (SANFLW) and was drafted with pick 20 overall in the 2021 AFL Women's draft.

== Early life ==
Tonon is originally from Mount Gambier, South Australia. She boarded at Scotch College in Adelaide while playing junior football.

While playing for Glenelg in the SANFLW, Tonon won the SANFL Women's premiership in 2021 when Glenelg defeated West Adelaide in the grand final. She was also named in the SANFLW Team of the Year in 2021 as a defender.

She represented South Australia at the under-19 AFLW Championships in the same year, excelling in the same defensive role. Playing junior football during her draft year, Tonon also played for the Mitcham Hawks Football Club in the Adelaide Footy League and Scotch College.

== AFL Women's career ==
Tonon made her AFL Women's debut in round four of 2022 (S6). She began her professional career playing as a forward, playing a further two games for the year.

While struggling for selection, Tonon managed appearances in the following two seasons, but it wasn't until 2024 that she broke into the team permanently. The utility became a consistent performer for the Crows, featuring in all but two of the club's matches. She also kicked her first goal for the club in round one against Port Adelaide. Prior to the 2025 season, Tonon extended her contract until the end of 2026.
