= Ella Friend =

Australian rules footballer

Personal information
- Full name: Ella Friend
- Born: 30 December 2003 (age 22)
- Original team: Greater Western Victoria Rebels (NAB League Girls)
- Draft: No. 4, 2021 national draft
- Debut: Round 4, 2022 (S6), St Kilda vs. West Coast, at Trevor Barker Beach Oval
- Height: 175 cm (5 ft 9 in)
- Position: Defender

Club information
- Current club: St Kilda
- Number: 16

Playing career^{1}
Years	Club	Games (Goals)
2022 (S6)–	St Kilda	25 (4)
- ^{1} Playing statistics correct to the end of the 2023 season.

Ella Friend is an Australian rules footballer playing for the St Kilda Football Club in the AFL Women's (AFLW). Friend was recruited by St Kilda with the 4th pick in the 2021 AFL Women's draft.

== AFL Women's career ==
Friend debuted for the Saints in the fourth round of 2022 AFL Women's season 6. On debut, Friend collected 7 disposals and 2 tackles.

=== Statistics ===
Updated to the end of 2022 (S7).

Legend
G	Goals	K	Kicks	D	Disposals	T	Tackles
B	Behinds	H	Handballs	M	Marks

Season	Team	No.	Games	Totals							Averages (per game)							Votes
Season	Team	No.	Games	G	B	K	H	D	M	T	G	B	K	H	D	M	T	Votes
2022 (S6)	St Kilda	16	7	0	0	41	22	65	12	8	0.0	0.0	5.9	3.1	9.0	1.7	1.1	0
2022 (S7)	St Kilda	16	9	0	0	47	13	60	15	15	0.0	0.0	5.2	1.4	6.7	1.7	1.7	0
Career			16	0	0	K	H	D	M	T	0.0	0.0	5.5	2.2	7.7	1.7	1.4	0
