= Ashanti Bush =

Personal information
- Full name: Ashanti Bush
- Born: 18 August 2002 (age 24); Wugularr, Northern Territory
- Original team: NT Thunder / Hawthorn FC (VFLW)
- Draft: No. 8, 2021 AFL Women's draft
- Height: 174 cm (5 ft 9 in)
- Position: Midfielder

Club information
- Current club: Gold Coast
- Number: 19

Playing career^{1}
Years	Club	Games (Goals)
2022 (S6)–	Gold Coast	10 (2)
- ^{1} Playing statistics correct to the end of the 2023 season.

Career highlights
- Goal of the Year: 2022 (S7)

Ashanti Bush (born 18 August 2002) is a former Australian rules footballer who played for Gold Coast in the AFL Women's competition (AFLW).

Bush was born and raised in Wugularr, Northern Territory of indigenous descent, from a Jawoyn (Bagala) regions descended from the Mayali, people and is from a family of Indigenous Australian artists. She attended primary school there before moving to Darwin to attend boarding school. Bush began playing Australian rules from a young age following her older sister and relative David Wirrpanda and Stephanie Williams, always aspiring to play AFLW. Proving a talent she joined the NT Thunder Academy and later moving to the Gold Coast to join the Gold Coast Suns Academy. To improve her chances of being drafted she followed a proven pathway moving to Melbourne to play games with Hawthorn Football Club’s VFLW team before being drafted by the Gold Coast Suns.

Bush was picked by the Gold Coast at number 8 in the 2021 AFL Women's draft. She debuted in 2022 (S6) and won the Goal of the Year in her second season for her Round 10 goal.
