= Joel Western =

Australian rules footballer (born 2002)

Personal information
- Full name: Joel Western
- Born: 12 October 2002 (age 24)
- Original team: Claremont (WAFL)
- Draft: No. 54, 2020 national draft
- Height: 174 cm (5 ft 9 in)
- Weight: 70 kg (154 lb)
- Position: Forward

Club information
- Current club: Claremont
- Number: 34

Playing career^{1}
Years	Club	Games (Goals)
2021–2022	Fremantle	4 (0)
2021–2022	Peel Thunder	23 (25)
2023–	Claremont	15 (6)
Total		42 (31)
- ^{1} Playing statistics correct to the end of round 18, 2023.

Joel Western (born 12 October 2002) is an Australian rules football player who played for the Fremantle Football Club in the Australian Football League (AFL).

A member of Fremantle's Next Generation Academy (NGA), as his mother was born in Singapore, Western was drafted with the 54th selection in the 2020 national draft, when Fremantle matched the Western Bulldogs's bid. He had played junior football for Claremont and represented Western Australia at Under 18 level. His father John, also played football for Subiaco in the 1980s and his sister Mikayla Western plays for the West Coast Eagles, having previously played one game for Fremantle in the AFL Women's league in 2022 as a COVID-19 top-up player.

He was selected to make his AFL debut for Fremantle in round 13 of the 2021 AFL season against Gold Coast, alongside fellow 2020 draftee and NGA member, Brandon Walker.

Following the conclusion of the 2022 season Fremantle Football Club delisted Western, after playing four AFL games for the club.

== Statistics ==
Statistics are correct to the end of 2022

Legend
G	Goals	K	Kicks	D	Disposals	T	Tackles
B	Behinds	H	Handballs	M	Marks

Season	Team	No.	Games	Totals							Averages (per game)						
Season	Team	No.	Games	G	B	K	H	D	M	T	G	B	K	H	D	M	T
2021	Fremantle	34	4	0	0	14	11	25	5	6	0.0	0.0	3.5	2.8	6.3	1.3	1.5
2022	Fremantle	34	0	–	–	–	–	–	–	–	–	–	–	–	–	–	–
Career			4	0	0	14	11	25	5	6	0.0	0.0	3.5	2.8	6.3	1.3	1.5
