= Amanda Ling =

Australian rules footballer (born 2002)

Personal information
- Born: 9 July 2002 (age 24)
- Original team: Oakleigh Chargers (Talent League Girls)
- Draft: No. 22, 2021 draft
- Debut: Round 1, 2022 (S6), Western Bulldogs vs. Melbourne, at Whitten Oval
- Height: 161 cm (5 ft 3 in)
- Position: Midfielder

Playing career^{1}
Years	Club	Games (Goals)
2022 (S6)–2022 (S7)	Western Bulldogs	2 (0)
- ^{1} Playing statistics correct to the end of 2022 (S7).

Career highlights
- 2× VFL Women's premiership player: 2024, 2025

Amanda Ling (born 9 July 2002) is a former professional Australian rules football player who played for the Western Bulldogs in the AFL Women's (AFLW).

== Early life ==
Ling was born in Malaysia to Malaysian parents. Her family migrated to Melbourne, Australia when Amanda was three years old.

She began her sporting career as a basketballer, but switched to Australian rules football in her early teenage years, joining the Whitehorse Suns in Melbourne's eastern suburbs. Ling played for the Oakleigh Chargers in the Talent League Girls, but was overlooked in the 2020 AFL Women's draft. She persisted with the Chargers, averaging 17.9 disposals and 6.5 tackles in the 2021 season, and finished the year with best-on-ground Grand Final honours and a Talent League premiership. She also played for Port Melbourne in the VFL Women's during the 2021 season. Ling got her chance at a professional career that year in the 2021 draft.

== AFL Women's career ==
Ling was selected by the Western Bulldogs with the 22nd overall pick in the 2021 AFL Women's draft. She made her debut immedediately, appearing in the round one, 2022 (S6) match against Melbourne at Whitten Oval.

Ahead of the 2023 AFL Women's season, Ling was delisted by the Bulldogs.

== Post-AFLW career ==
Ling committed to the Bulldogs following her axing, signing with their reserves team in the VFL Women's in 2023. In 2024, she moved to North Melbourne (later North Melbourne Werribee) in the VFLW, where she won consecutive premierships.
