= Jessica Low =

Australian rules footballer

Personal information
- Born: 5 November 1999 (age 26)
- Original team: Claremont (WAFLW)
- Draft: No. 52, 2021 AFL Women's draft
- Debut: Round 1, 2022 (S6), Fremantle vs. West Coast, at Fremantle Oval
- Height: 165 cm (5 ft 5 in)
- Position: Defender

Club information
- Current club: Fremantle
- Number: 30

Playing career^{1}
| Years | Club | Games (Goals) |
| 2022 (S6)– | Fremantle | 66 (2) |
- ^{1} Playing statistics correct to the end of the 2026 season.

Jessica Low (born 5 November 1999) is an Australian rules footballer playing for the Fremantle Football Club in the AFL Women's (AFLW).

Low was drafted by Fremantle with their fifth selection, and 52nd overall in the 2021 AFL Women's draft. In 2019 she won the Cath Boyce Rookie of the Year award for her debut season for Claremont in the WAFL Women's league.

Low made her debut in the opening round of 2022 season 6. Whilst recruited as a midfielder, Low played her first AFLW games as a defender, often on the opponent's best forward. She performed very well, keeping her direct opponents goalless during the first four games.
