= Annabel Johnson =

Australian rules footballer

Personal information
- Full name: Annabel Johnson
- Born: 6 November 2000 (age 25)
- Draft: No. 15, 2021 national draft
- Debut: Round 1, 2022 (S6), Geelong vs. North Melbourne, at Arden Street Oval
- Height: 167 cm (5 ft 6 in)
- Position: Half-back

Playing career^{1}
Years	Club	Games (Goals)
2022 (S6)–2023	Geelong	16 (0)
2024–2025	West Coast	4 (0)
Total		20 (0)
- ^{1} Playing statistics correct to the end of the 2025 season.

Annabel Johnson is an Australian rules footballer who played for West Coast in the AFL Women's (AFLW). She has previously played for Geelong. Johnson was recruited by Geelong with the 15th pick in the 2021 AFL Women's draft.

== AFL Women's career ==
Johnson debuted for Geelong in the opening round of 2022 AFL Women's season 6. On debut, Johnson collected 6 disposals and 3 marks. After stringing together four games, Johnson suffered a foot fracture in the team's round 5 win against West Coast, keeping her out of the team for the remainder of the season.

Her 2022 season 7 was a much more successful year. Playing every game, she became an important part of Geelong's backline, making the initial 44 player squad of the 22under22 team at the conclusion of the season.

2023 was a challenging year as Johnson managed just one game before a knee injury ruled her out from Round 2 onwards.

Ahead of the 2024 AFL Women's season, Johnson was traded to West Coast.

She missed the 2024 season with an ACL injury and experienced setbacks during the 2025 season before debuting for the Eagles in Round 6 against Melbourne in Round 6. She would go on to play 3 further games before being delisted at the end of the season.

=== Statistics ===
Updated to the end of the 2025 season.

Legend
G	Goals	K	Kicks	D	Disposals	T	Tackles
B	Behinds	H	Handballs	M	Marks

Season	Team	No.	Games	Totals							Averages (per game)							Votes
Season	Team	No.	Games	G	B	K	H	D	M	T	G	B	K	H	D	M	T	Votes
2022 (S6)	Geelong	30	4	0	0	27	5	32	12	12	0.0	0.0	6.8	1.3	8.0	3.0	3.0	0
2022 (S7)	Geelong	2	11	0	0	82	36	118	36	23	0.0	0.0	7.5	3.3	10.7	3.3	2.1	0
2023	Geelong	2	1	0	0	10	1	11	3	1	0.0	0.0	10	1	11	3	1	0
2024	West Coast	24	0	0	0	0	0	0	0	0	0.0	0.0	0	0	0	0	0	0
2025	West Coast	24	4	0	0	22	7	29	8	6	0.0	0.0	5.5	2.0	7.3	2.0	1.5	0
Career			20	0	0	141	49	190	59	42	0.0	0.0	7.1	2.5	9.5	3.0	2.1	0
