= Stella Reid (footballer) =

Australian rules footballer

Personal information
- Full name: Stella Reid
- Born: 10 September 2003 (age 23)
- Original team: Oakleigh Chargers (VFLW)
- Draft: No. 5, 2021 national draft
- Debut: Round 1, 2022 (S6), Richmond vs. St Kilda, at RSEA Park
- Height: 173 cm (5 ft 8 in)
- Position: Midfielder

Club information
- Current club: Richmond
- Number: 25

Playing career^{1}
Years	Club	Games (Goals)
2022 (S6)–	Richmond	22 (8)
- ^{1} Playing statistics correct to the end of the 2023 season.

Stella Reid (born 10 September 2003) is an Australian rules footballer playing for the Richmond Football Club in the AFL Women's (AFLW). Reid was drafted by Richmond with their first selection and fifth overall in the 2021 AFL Women's draft. She made her debut against St Kilda at RSEA Park in the first round of 2022 season 6.

== Statistics ==
Statistics are correct to round 4, 2022 (S6)

Legend
G	Goals	K	Kicks	D	Disposals	T	Tackles
B	Behinds	H	Handballs	M	Marks

Season	Team	No.	Games	Totals							Averages (per game)						
Season	Team	No.	Games	G	B	K	H	D	M	T	G	B	K	H	D	M	T
2022 (S6)	Richmond	25	4	1	0	8	11	19	2	6	0.3	0	2.0	2.8	4.8	0.5	1.5
Career			4	1	0	8	11	19	2	6	0.3	0	2.0	2.8	4.8	0.5	1.5
