= Meagan Kiely =

Australian rules footballer

Personal information
- Full name: Meagan Kiely
- Born: 15 December 1994 (age 31); Tasmania
- Original team: North Melbourne (VFLW)
- Draft: No. 48, 2021 National Draft
- Debut: Round 1, 2022 (S6), Richmond vs. St Kilda, at RSEA Park
- Height: 168 cm (5 ft 6 in)
- Position: Midfielder

Playing career^{1}
Years	Club	Games (Goals)
2022 (S6)–2023	Richmond	19 (4)
- ^{1} Playing statistics correct to the end of 2023 season.

Meagan Kiely (pron. /ˈkaɪli/, "Kylie"; born 15 December 1994) is an Australian rules footballer playing for the Richmond Football Club in the AFL Women's (AFLW). Kiely was drafted by Richmond with their third selection and forty eighth overall in the 2021 AFL Women's draft. She made her debut against St Kilda at RSEA Park in the first round of 2022 season 6.

Kiely announced her retirement on 16 November 2023.

== Statistics ==
Statistics are correct to end 2023 season

Legend
G	Goals	K	Kicks	D	Disposals	T	Tackles
B	Behinds	H	Handballs	M	Marks

Season	Team	No.	Games	Totals							Averages (per game)							Votes
Season	Team	No.	Games	G	B	K	H	D	M	T	G	B	K	H	D	M	T	Votes
2022 (S6)	Richmond	31	9	3	1	52	33	85	13	41	0.3	0.1	5.8	3.7	9.5	1.4	4.6	
2022 (S7)	Richmond	13	9	1	2	45	33	78	15	20	0.1	0.2	5.0	3.7	8.7	1.7	2.2	
2023	Richmond	13	1	0	0	2	0	2	1	2	0.0	0.0	2.0	0.0	2.0	1.0	2.0	
Career			19	4	3	99	66	165	29	63	0.2	0.2	5.2	3.5	8.7	1.5	3.3	
