= Mikayla Western =

Australian rules footballer

Personal information
- Born: 1 July 1998 (age 28)
- Original team: Claremont (WAFLW)
- Draft: 2021 AFL Women's draft
- Debut: Round 9, 2022 AFL Women's season 6, Fremantle vs. Melbourne, at Optus Stadium
- Height: 166 cm (5 ft 5 in)
- Position: Medium Forward

Club information
- Current club: West Coast
- Number: 21

Playing career^{1}
Years	Club	Games (Goals)
2022	Fremantle	1 (0)
2022–	West Coast	39 (10)
Total		40 (10)
- ^{1} Playing statistics correct to the end of 2025.

Mikayla Western (born 1 July 1998) is an Australian rules footballer playing for the West Coast Eagles in the AFL Women's (AFLW). She previously played for the Fremantle Football Club.

== AFLW career ==
Mikayla is the sister of former Fremantle player Joel Western. She was recruited as a top-up player by Fremantle in the 2021 AFL Women's draft, and was a train-on during the 2022 AFL Women's season 6 pre-season. She made her debut in round nine against Melbourne at Optus Stadium. She was not retained by Fremantle at the season's end, having played just the one senior game, before being drafted by West Coast with pick 53 in the 2022 AFL Women's draft.

Western made her debut for West Coast in the opening round of the 2022 AFL Women's season 7 against Port Adelaide, collecting 12 disposals and kicking a goal during the twelve point win.

Western was appointed vice-captain of West Coast ahead of the 2025 AFL Women's season.

== Statistics ==
Updated to the end of the 2025 season.

Legend
G	Goals	K	Kicks	D	Disposals	T	Tackles
B	Behinds	H	Handballs	M	Marks

Season	Team	No.	Games	Totals							Averages (per game)							Votes
Season	Team	No.	Games	G	B	K	H	D	M	T	G	B	K	H	D	M	T	Votes
2022 (S6)	Fremantle	37	1	0	0	6	2	8	2	3	0.0	0.0	6.0	2.0	8.0	2.0	3.0	0
2022 (S7)	West Coast	21	8	3	1	34	27	61	10	21	0.4	0.1	4.3	3.4	7.6	1.3	2.6	0
2023	West Coast	21	9	0	2	34	29	63	11	29	0.0	0.2	3.8	3.2	7.0	1.2	3.2	0
2024	West Coast	21	11	4	6	58	27	85	9	53	0.4	0.5	5.3	2.5	7.7	0.8	4.8	0
2025	West Coast	21	11	3	3	56	52	108	16	43	0.3	0.3	5.1	4.7	9.8	1.5	3.9	0
Career			40	10	12	188	137	325	48	149	0.3	0.3	4.7	3.4	8.1	1.2	3.7	0
