= Leah Cutting =

Australian rules footballer

Personal information
- Full name: Leah Margaret Cutting
- Born: 14 March 1992 (age 34)
- Original teams: Norwood (SANFLW); Morphettville Park (AdFL)
- Draft: Free agency in 2021
- Debut: Round 1, 2022 (S6), St Kilda vs. Richmond, at Frankston Park
- Height: 184 cm (6 ft 0 in)
- Position: Ruck

Playing career^{1}
Years	Club	Games (Goals)
2022 (S6)–2022 (S7)	St Kilda	7 (0)
2023	Essendon	1 (0)
Total		8 (0)
- ^{1} Playing statistics correct to the end of the 2023 season.

Career highlights
- SANFL Women's premiership player: 2017

Leah Cutting (born 14 March 1992) is a former professional Australian rules footballer who played for the St Kilda Football Club and the Essendon Football Club in the AFL Women's (AFLW).

== Early career ==
In her early life, Cutting focused on athletics rather than team sport. In 2009, she competed in the Australian Youth Olympic Festival as a long-distance freestyle swimmer. She participated in 10km marathon swims across the world, including in Singapore and Russia.

She later played football with the Morphettville Park Football Club in the Adelaide Footy League, and in 2017 was allocated to Norwood to participate in the inaugural SANFL Women's League season. Cutting was named co-vice-captain and wrote history as the first player to record a statistic in the competition. She became a SANFLW premiership player later than year when Norwood went on to win the first premiership in the history of the competition. In 2019, she was voted as co-captain of the Redlegs and in 2021, she became the first player to reach 50 SANFLW appearances, and later that year was named in the Team of the Year for the third time.

== AFL Women's career ==
Prior to the 2022 AFL Women's season 6, Cutting was signed by St Kilda as a free agent. She made her AFLW debut in the round one match against Richmond at Frankston Park. Cutting played seven games in her debut season.

She missed 2022 season 7 to focus on her other professional occupation with the South Australia Police. Following two seasons on St Kilda's list, Cutting was delisted by the club, and moved to Essendon as a delisted free agent. After just one game for Essendon during the 2023 season, Cutting was delisted by the Bombers.

In 2024, she returned home to South Australia to play for Woodville-West Torrens in the SANFLW. The following year, she led the Eagles to a grand final. She also represented South Australia in the SANFLW versus VFL Women's game in 2025.

== Statistics ==
Updated to the end of the 2023 season.

Legend
G	Goals	K	Kicks	D	Disposals	T	Tackles
B	Behinds	H	Handballs	M	Marks	H/O	Hit-outs

Season	Team	No.	Games	Totals								Averages (per game)							
Season	Team	No.	Games	G	B	K	H	D	M	T	H/O	G	B	K	H	D	M	T	H/O
2022 (S6)	St Kilda	26	7	0	0	26	20	46	11	37	89	0.0	0.0	3.7	2.9	6.6	1.6	5.3	12.7
2022 (S7)	St Kilda	26	0	–	–	–	–	–	–	–	–	–	–	–	–	–	–	–	–
2023	Essendon	18	1	0	0	4	1	5	0	6	6	0.0	0.0	4.0	1.0	5.0	0.0	6.0	6.0
Career			8	0	0	30	21	51	11	43	95	0.0	0.0	3.8	2.6	6.4	1.4	5.4	11.9
