= Serena Gibbs =

Australian rules football player (born 2000)

Personal information
- Born: 3 June 2000 (age 26)
- Original team: Eastern Ranges (NAB League Girls)
- Draft: No. 44, 2019 AFLW draft
- Debut: Round 5, 2021, Carlton vs. North Melbourne, at University of Tasmania Stadium
- Height: 178 cm (5 ft 10 in)
- Position: Key forward/ruck

Club information
- Current club: Fremantle

Playing career^{1}
Years	Club	Games (Goals)
2020–S7(2022)	Carlton	6 (3)
2023–2024	Fremantle	2 (1)
Total		8 (4)
- ^{1} Playing statistics correct to the end of the 2023 season.

Serena Gibbs (born 3 June 2000) is an Australian rules footballer, who played for Fremantle in the AFL Women's (AFLW).

== Junior career ==
As a junior, Gibbs initially played netball in the Victorian state league. She switched to football in 2019 on the recommendation of the mother of Gibbs' friend Emerson Woods. (Gibbs and Woods would later reunite as teammates at Carlton). Gibbs began playing for the Eastern Ranges in the NAB League Girls. Although she lacked the football knowledge of more experienced players, she nevertheless had a successful season, leading the club's goalkicking with 11 goals and ranking among the top three players in the club's best and fairest.

Gibbs also played six matches for Hawthorn in the VFL Women's (VFLW). Her performance in a game against Melbourne University, in which she kicked two goals and took four marks against a defence featuring AFLW players, was particularly noted for establishing her footballing potential to clubs' scouts.

== AFLW career ==
Gibbs was selected by Carlton with pick 44 in the 2019 AFLW draft, their fourth selection. In 2020, she focused on developing her football skills and gym work, but ultimately would not play any AFLW matches in her first year. In the lead-up to the 2021 season, Gibbs played as Carlton's full-forward in a practice match against St Kilda, and kicked two goals in a strong display. Carlton's co-captain Kerryn Harrington predicted Gibbs would "get her opportunity" in 2021; she went on to make her AFLW debut in round 5 against North Melbourne. It was revealed Gibbs signed a one-year contract extension with Carlton on 10 June 2021.

In March 2023, Gibbs was traded to Fremantle.
