= Sarah Lakay =

Australian rules footballer

Personal information
- Full name: Sarah Lakay
- Born: 20 February 2003 (age 23)
- Original team: Swan Districts (WAFLW)
- Draft: No. 40, 2021 national draft
- Debut: Round 3, 2022 (S6), West Coast vs. Adelaide, at Swinburne Centre
- Height: 186 cm (6 ft 1 in)
- Position: Ruck

Club information
- Current club: West Coast
- Number: 23

Playing career^{1}
| Years | Club | Games (Goals) |
| 2022 (S6)– | West Coast | 20 (0) |
- ^{1} Playing statistics correct to the end of the 2023 season.

Career highlights
- AFL Women's Rising Star nominee: S7

Sarah Lakay (born 20 February 2003) is an Australian rules footballer playing for the West Coast Eagles in the AFL Women's (AFLW). Lakay was recruited by the Eagles with the 40th pick in the 2021 AFL Women's draft. She also plays basketball.

== Football career ==
Lakay debuted for the Eagles in the third round of 2022 AFL Women's season 6. On debut, she collected 7 disposals and 10 hitouts in a loss against Adelaide. Lakay earned a rising star nomination in 2022 season 7, round 5, after having an outstanding performance against Fremantle where she tallied 42 hitouts, the second-most in an AFLW match ever, while also collecting five tackles and seven disposals.

=== Statistics ===
Updated to the end of 2022 (S7).

Legend
| G | Goals | K | Kicks | D | Disposals | T | Tackles |
| B | Behinds | H | Handballs | M | Marks | H/O | Hit-outs |

| Season | Team | No. | Games | Totals | | | | | | | | Averages (per game) | | | | | | | | Votes |
| Season | Team | No. | Games | G | B | K | H | D | M | T | H/O | G | B | K | H | D | M | T | H/O | Votes |
|---|---|---|---|---|---|---|---|---|---|---|---|---|---|---|---|---|---|---|---|---|
| 2022 (S6) | West Coast | 23 | 8 | 0 | 0 | 15 | 21 | 36 | 6 | 19 | 99 | 0.0 | 0.0 | 1.9 | 2.6 | 4.5 | 0.8 | 2.4 | 12.4 | 0 |
| 2022 (S7) | West Coast | 23 | 10 | 0 | 0 | 32 | 35 | 67 | 10 | 41 | 248 | 0.0 | 0.0 | 3.2 | 3.5 | 6.7 | 1.0 | 4.1 | 24.8 | |
| Career | | | 18 | 0 | 0 | 47 | 56 | 103 | 16 | 60 | 347 | 0.0 | 0.0 | 2.6 | 3.1 | 5.7 | 0.9 | 3.3 | 19.3 | 0 |

== Basketball career ==
Lakay played for the East Perth Eagles of the State Basketball League (SBL) during the 2019 season. In 2020, she played for the Kalamunda Eastern Suns in the West Coast Classic. In 2023, she played for the Warwick Senators in the NBL1 West.

== Honours and achievements ==
- West Coast record holder for hitouts in a game: 42 – 2022 (S7)
