= El Chaston =

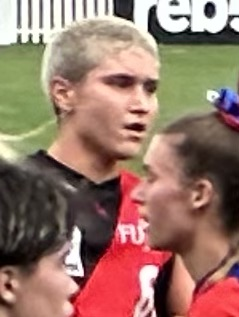
- Chaston in 2025

Personal information
- Full name: Eloise Chaston
- Born: 23 February 2002 (age 24)
- Draft: No. 32, 2021 AFL Women's draft
- Debut: Round 1, 2022, Collingwood vs. Carlton, at Princes Park
- Height: 169 cm (5 ft 7 in)
- Position: Half-forward

Playing career
| Years | Club | Games (Goals) |
| 2022 (S6)–2022 (S7) | Collingwood | 11 (3) |

El Chaston (born 23 February 2002) is an Australian rules footballer who plays for the Essendon Football Club in the VFL Women's (VFLW). They previously played for Collingwood in the AFL Women's (AFLW).

== Football career ==
After co-captaining the Eastern Ranges in the NAB League Girls competition and then making their VFL Women's debut with Hawthorn in 2021, Chaston was drafted into Collingwood in 2021 at pick 32.

They played eleven AFLW games across two seasons until they were delisted in February 2023.

In April 2023, Chaston played their first VFLW match with Essendon in Round 4 against Casey at The Hangar.

In 2024, Chaston became Essendon captain and won the club Best & Fairest award.

In 2025, they continued as Essendon captain and were named in the best players for Victoria in the VFLW versus SANFLW game.

== Personal life ==
Chaston is non-binary and has used they/them pronouns since August 2022. In January 2023, Chaston underwent a mastectomy.
