= Jasmine Simmons =

Personal information
- Born: 6 March 1999 (age 27); Broken Hill, New South Wales
- Original teams: North Broken Hill Football Club; Gol Gol Hawks Football Club
- Draft: 2021 rookie signing
- Debut: Round 1, 2022 ^{(S6)}, Adelaide vs. Brisbane, at Flinders University Stadium
- Height: 180 cm (5 ft 11 in)
- Position: Key defender/utility

Playing career^{1}
Years	Club	Games (Goals)
2022 ^{(S6)}–2022 ^{(S7)}	Adelaide	8 (0)
2023–2024	Port Adelaide	3 (0)
Total		11 (0)
- ^{1} Playing statistics correct to the end of 2024.

Jasmine Grace Simmons (born 6 March 1999) is a former Australian rules football player who last played for the Port Adelaide Football Club in the AFL Women's (AFLW). She was initially drafted as a rookie to the Adelaide Crows prior to the 2022 season and was traded following two seasons at the club.

== Early life and basketball ==
Originally from Broken Hill, Simmons played for the North Broken Hill Football Club in her youth. With limited football opportunities for women in a country town, Simmons turned her athletic interests to basketball. She captained the Australia women's national under-17 basketball team, nicknamed the Sapphires, and in 2016 led the team for average rebounds, assists, and spoils as their leading point guard. At junior age, she won gold with the Australia women's national basketball team in the 2019 World University Games.

Simmons spent three years at Oregon State University playing basketball prior her return home to New South Wales. Once returning to Australia, she played basketball for the Mildura Heat and the Ballarat Miners in the NBL1 South as well as football, with more opportunities for women to play. She played country football for North Broken Hill and the Gol Gol Hawks Football Club.

During the AFL Women's off-seasons, Simmons also played basketball for West Adelaide Bearcats in the NBL1 Central league, as well as Woodville-West Torrens in the South Australian National Football League (SANFLW).

== AFL Women's career ==
=== Adelaide Crows ===
Simmons was officially drafted to the Adelaide Crows as a rookie signing in 2021, despite interest from Richmond and North Melbourne. She debuted for the Crows in round one of season 6 in the AFL Women's. She wore the number 11 in her first game, which came against Brisbane at Flinders University Stadium.

=== Port Adelaide ===
Following two seasons and eight games at the Crows, Simmons was traded to cross-town rivals Port Adelaide for the club's second season in the AFL Women's competition. The trade involved Sarah Goodwin, who crossed the divide the other way. She played three games in her first season at the Power, but was not involved in Port Adelaide's historic 2024 campaign in which they made finals.

Simmons was subsequently delisted by the Power following the 2024 season.
