= Meg Macdonald =

Australian rules footballer

Personal information
- Full name: Meg Macdonald
- Born: 28 June 1998 (age 28); Tyabb, Victoria
- Original team: Casey Demons (VFLW)
- Debut: Round 2, 2022 (S6), Richmond vs. Melbourne, at Punt Road Oval
- Height: 172 cm (5 ft 8 in)
- Position: Midfielder

Club information
- Current club: Richmond
- Number: 38

Playing career^{1}
Years	Club	Games (Goals)
2022 (S6)–	Richmond	23 (2)
- ^{1} Playing statistics correct to the end of the 2023 season.

Meg Macdonald (born 28 June 1998) is an Australian rules footballer playing for the Richmond Football Club in the AFL Women's (AFLW). Macdonald signed with Richmond in January 2022 as a replacement player for Hannah McLaren who was placed on the clubs inactive list. She made her debut against Melbourne at Punt Road in the second round of 2022 season 6.

== Statistics ==
Statistics are correct to round 2, 2022 (S6)

Legend
G	Goals	K	Kicks	D	Disposals	T	Tackles
B	Behinds	H	Handballs	M	Marks

Season	Team	No.	Games	Totals							Averages (per game)						
Season	Team	No.	Games	G	B	K	H	D	M	T	G	B	K	H	D	M	T
2022 (S6)	Richmond	38	1	0	0	1	0	1	0	0	0	0	1	0	1	0	0
Career			1	0	0	1	0	1	0	0	0	0	1	0	1	0	0
