= Chantel Emonson =

Australian rules footballer (born 1993)

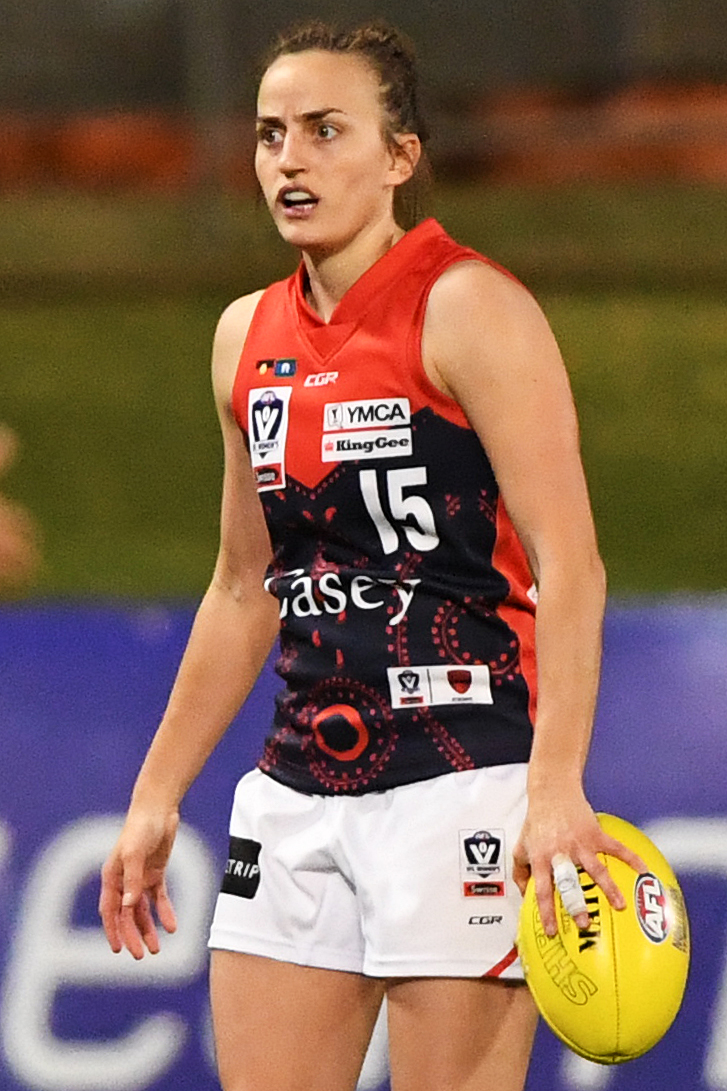
- Emonson playing for Casey Demons in July 2019

Personal information
- Born: 8 May 1993 (age 33)
- Original team: Casey Demons (VFLW)
- Draft: 2018 rookie signing
- Debut: Round 1, 2019, Melbourne vs. Fremantle, at Casey Fields
- Height: 162 cm (5 ft 4 in)
- Position: Defender

Club information
- Current club: Geelong

Playing career^{1}
Years	Club	Games (Goals)
2019–2021	Melbourne	22 (3)
2022–	Geelong	34 (1)
Total		56 (4)
- ^{1} Playing statistics correct to the end of the 2023 season.

Chantel Emonson (born 8 May 1993) is an Australian rules footballer playing for Geelong in the AFL Women's (AFLW). She played cricket at state and national levels before competing in the VFL Women's. Emonson previously played for Melbourne and was one of Melbourne's rookie signings in the 2018 AFLW off-season and debuted in the opening round of the 2019 season.

== Early life ==
Emonson is from Berriwillock in the Mallee region of Victoria, Australia. She played football in boys competitions at an early age before she grew too old to participate. Emonson turned to netball and cricket; in her junior cricket career she represented Country Mallee Murray and Country Northern Rivers at state level in under-16 and under-18 competitions from 2008 to 2011, and Victoria in the national 2009/2010 under-18 championships. She also played for Birchip Cricket Club in the 2009/2010 season. After a 12-year absence from football Emonson returned in 2018 with the Casey Demons in the VFL Women's. She had an injury-plagued season.

== AFLW career ==
Having not played football for the previous three years, Emonson was eligible to join an AFLW club during the 2018 off-season as a rookie signing. She was recruited by Melbourne as their second signing and debuted in the opening round of the 2019 AFLW season; a loss to Fremantle at Casey Fields. Emonson appeared all seven games in her debut season, playing as a small defender. In June 2021, Emonson was traded to Geelong.

In March 2025, Emonson announced that she was pregnant and was placed on the inactive list by Geelong for the 2025 AFL Women's season.
