= Makaela Tuhakaraina =

Australian rules footballer

Personal information
- Born: 23 August 2003 (age 23); Australia
- Original team: South Fremantle (WAFLW)
- Draft: No. 38, 2021 AFL Women's draft
- Debut: Round 1, 2022 (S6), Fremantle vs. West Coast, at Fremantle Oval
- Height: 157 cm (5 ft 2 in)
- Position: Forward

Club information
- Current club: Fremantle
- Number: 13

Playing career^{1}
Years	Club	Games (Goals)
2022 (S6)–2024	Fremantle	17 (5)
- ^{1} Playing statistics correct to the end of the 2024 season.

Makaela Tuhakaraina (born 23 August 2003) is an Australian rules footballer, who played for the Fremantle Football Club in the AFL Women's (AFLW).

Tuhakaraina was drafted by Fremantle with their fourth selection, and 38th overall in the 2021 AFL Women's draft. A former junior rugby league player, she switched to playing Australian rules football in 2020 when COVID-19 related led to the women's rugby league season being cancelled due to a lack of teams.

Tuhakaraina made her debut in the opening round of 2022 AFL Women's season 6, playing as a small forward.
