= Alana Woodward =

Australian rules footballer

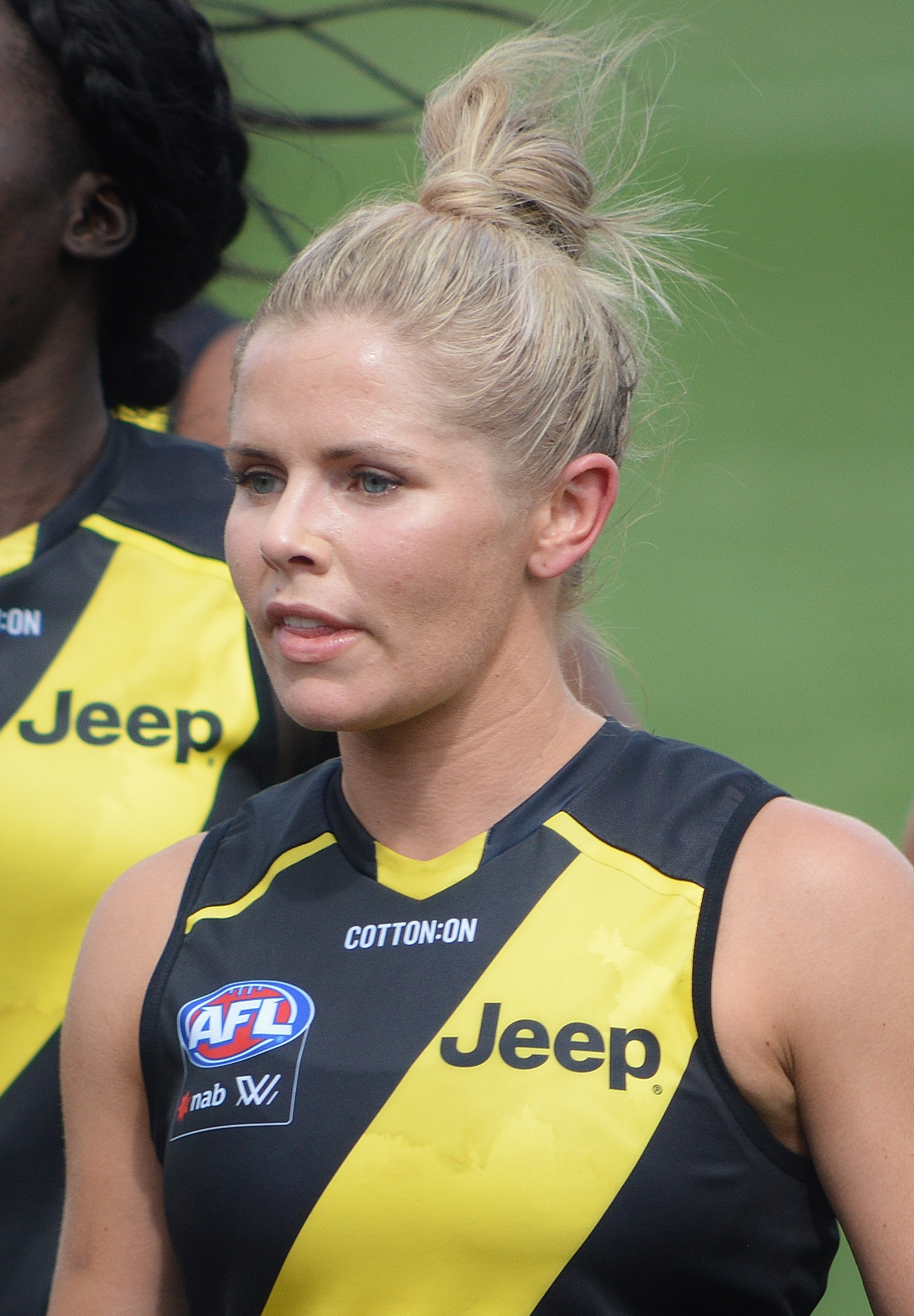
- Woodward with Richmond in February 2020

Personal information
- Born: 13 July 1990 (age 36)
- Original team: Richmond (VFLW)
- Debut: Round 1, 2020, Richmond vs. Carlton, at Ikon Park
- Height: 170 cm (5 ft 7 in)
- Position: Midfielder

Club information
- Current club: Sydney
- Number: 13

Playing career^{1}
Years	Club	Games (Goals)
2020–2021	Richmond	5 (0)
2022	St Kilda	2 (0)
S7 (2022)–2024	Sydney	18 (0)
Total		25 (0)
- ^{1} Playing statistics correct to the end of the 2024 season.

Alana Woodward (born 13 July 1990) is a former Australian rules footballer who played for Sydney, Richmond and St Kilda in the AFL Women's (AFLW).

== AFLW career ==
Woodward signed with Richmond during the 2019 expansion club signing period in September. She made her debut against Carlton at Ikon Park in the opening round of the 2020 season. In June 2021, Woodward was delisted by the club, along with Phoebe Monahan. A week later, she was signed by St Kilda as a delisted free agent. At the end of the season, she was delisted by St Kilda. The following month, she was signed by expansion club Sydney as a delisted free agent.

== Statistics ==
Statistics are correct to the end of the 2020 season.

Legend
G	Goals	K	Kicks	D	Disposals	T	Tackles
B	Behinds	H	Handballs	M	Marks

Season	Team	No.	Games	Totals							Averages (per game)						
Season	Team	No.	Games	G	B	K	H	D	M	T	G	B	K	H	D	M	T
2020	Richmond	13	5	0	0	6	12	18	2	17	0.0	0.0	1.2	2.4	3.6	0.4	3.4
Career			5	0	0	6	12	18	2	17	0.0	0.0	1.2	2.4	3.6	0.4	3.4
