= Tahlia Gillard =

Personal information
- Full name: Tahlia Gillard
- Born: 12 December 2003 (age 22)
- Original team: Calder Cannons (NAB League Girls)
- Draft: No. 42, 2021 AFL Women's draft
- Debut: Season 6, 2022
- Height: 190 cm (6 ft 3 in)
- Position: Key defender / Ruck

Playing career^{1}
Years	Club	Games (Goals)
2022–	Melbourne	49 (1)
- ^{1} Playing statistics correct to the end of the 2025 season.

Tahlia Gillard (born 12 December 2003) is an Australian rules footballer who plays for the Melbourne Football Club in the AFL Women's (AFLW) competition.

== Early life ==
Gillard played junior football with the Calder Cannons in the NAB League Girls competition. She also represented Vic Metro at national underage championships, developing her skills as both a ruck and key defender.

== AFLW career ==
Gillard was selected by Melbourne with pick No. 42 in the 2021 AFL Women's draft. She made her debut during Season 6 (2022) and played three games in her first year.

In Season 7 (2022), Gillard became a regular in Melbourne’s defence. She played a significant role in the team's premiership win, including keeping Brisbane forward Jesse Wardlaw goalless in the Grand Final.

In 2023, she was included in the 22under22 squad and was named in the All-Australian squad of 44 players. By the end of the 2023 season, Gillard had played 39 games.

== Playing style ==
Gillard is known for her height (190 cm), defensive marking, and ability to match up on key forwards. She has also spent time in the ruck when needed.

== Honours and achievements ==
- AFLW premiership player: 2022 (Season 7)
- 22under22 team: 2023
- All-Australian squad nominee: 2023
