= Lulu Pullar =

Australian rules football and association football player (born 1998)

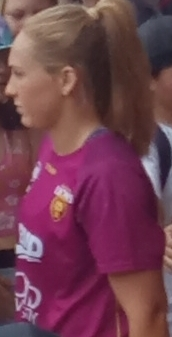
- Pullar with the Brisbane Lions in 2022
- Born: Lucinda Margie Pullar; 3 July 1998 (age 28)
- Height: 173 cm (5 ft 8 in)
Australian rules football career
Personal information
- Original team: Bond University (QWAFL)
- Draft: No. 58, 2021 AFL Women's draft
- Debut: Round 5, 2022 (S6), Brisbane vs. Collingwood, at Maroochydore Multi Sports Complex
- Position: Defender
Club information
- Current club: Sydney
Playing career^{1}
Years	Club	Games (Goals)
2022 (S6)–2022 (S7)	Brisbane	14 (0)
2023–2024	North Melbourne	13 (3)
2025–	Sydney	0 (0)
Total		27 (3)
- ^{1} Playing statistics correct to the end of the 2024 season.
Association football career
- Position: Midfielder
College career
Years	Team	Apps	(Gls)
2016	USC Trojans	3	(0)
Senior career*
Years	Team	Apps	(Gls)
2014	Olympic FC	16	(1)
2015	University of Queensland	?	(?)
2017–2018	Brisbane Roar	1	(0)
- * Club domestic league appearances and goals

Lucinda Margie "Lulu" Pullar (born 3 July 1998) is an Australian rules footballer and former soccer player who currently plays for Sydney in the AFL Women's (AFLW). She previously played in the AFLW for Brisbane and North Melbourne. In soccer, she played for the Brisbane Roar in the W-League.

== Early life ==
Pullar was born on 3 July 1998, daughter of Rebecca and Robert, and attended high school at Somerville House in South Brisbane, Queensland.

== Association football ==
Pullar played as a midfielder for Brisbane Roar in the W-League, in the 2017–18 season. She played one game as a substitute.

== Australian rules football ==
After transitioning to Australian rules and playing for Bond University in the AFL Queensland Women's League, Pullar was selected by Brisbane with the 58th pick in the 2021 AFL Women's draft. She made her AFLW debut in the Lions' round 5, 2022 (S6) win over Collingwood at Maroochydore Multi Sports Complex.

At the end of 2022 season 7, she was traded to North Melbourne as part of a five-club deal.

After two seasons at the Kangaroos, she was traded to Sydney for draft picks 49 and 51 in December 2024.
