= Amy Franklin =

Australian rules footballer

Personal information
- Born: 4 February 2003 (age 23)
- Original team: Claremont (WAFLW)
- Draft: No. 14, 2021 AFL Women's draft
- Debut: Round 4, 2022 (S6), Fremantle vs. Western Bulldogs, at Whitten Oval
- Height: 178 cm (5 ft 10 in)
- Position: Forward

Club information
- Current club: West Coast
- Number: 19

Playing career^{1}
Years	Club	Games (Goals)
2022 (S6)–2022 (S7)	Fremantle	12 (6)
2023–	West Coast	8 (2)
Total		20 (8)
- ^{1} Playing statistics correct to the end of the 2023 season.

Amy Franklin (born 4 February 2003) is an Australian rules footballer playing for West Coast in the AFL Women's (AFLW). She has previously played for Fremantle.

== AFLW career ==
Franklin was drafted by Fremantle with their first selection, and 14th overall in the 2021 AFL Women's draft.

Franklin made her debut in the fourth round of 2022 season 6, kicking two goals to help Fremantle beat the Western Bulldogs.

In March 2023, Franklin was traded to West Coast in exchange for picks #3 and #21.
