= Luka Yoshida-Martin =

Australian rules footballer

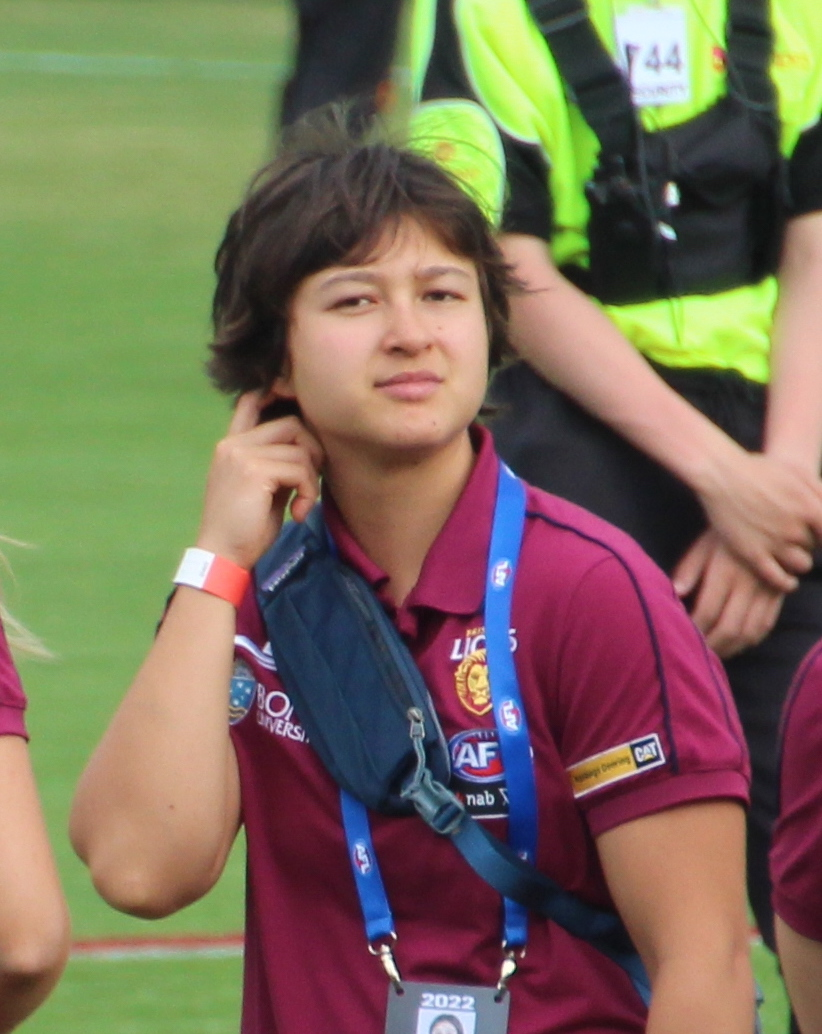
- Yoshida-Martin after the 2022 season 7 Grand Final

Personal information
- Born: 10 April 2001 (age 25)
- Original team: University of Queensland (QWAFL)
- Draft: No. 53, 2021 AFL Women's draft
- Debut: Round 6, 2022 (S6), Brisbane vs. St Kilda, at Trevor Barker Beach Oval
- Height: 161 cm (5 ft 3 in)
- Position: Forward

Playing career
Years	Club	Games (Goals)
2022 (S6)–2024	Brisbane	5 (2)

Luka Yoshida-Martin (born 10 April 2001) is an Australian rules footballer who played for Brisbane in the AFL Women's (AFLW).

== Early life ==
=== Soccer career ===
Yoshida-Martin started as a soccer player at the age of 8 and was identified at an early age selected as part of the National Premier Leagues Women's academy program. She played junior football with Brisbane City FC and The Gap FC. She was selected to represent Queensland in soccer.

She attended secondary school at Kedron State High School in Brisbane, Queensland.

Aged 19, she was signed by Mitchelton FC to play senior football. A serious ankle injury almost put an end to her soccer career and she switched codes, playing both sports.

=== Switch to Australian rules ===
Yoshida-Martin began playing Australian rules in 2019 for the Kedron Football Club and was part of the Division 1 premiership team. She also played at University of Queensland in the AFL Queensland Women's League.

Yoshida-Martin was drafted by Brisbane with the 53rd pick in the 2021 AFL Women's draft.

== AFLW career ==
Yoshida-Martin played three games in her debut season in 2022 season 6, the first of which came in in the Lions' round 6 game against St Kilda at Trevor Barker Beach Oval on 13 February. She did not play an AFLW game in 2022 season 7, and was placed on the inactive list for 2023 after tearing her anterior cruciate ligament ahead of the season. She played two further games in 2024, but was delisted at the end of the season.

She played five games and scored two goals across her AFLW career.

== Statistics ==
Legend
G	Goals	K	Kicks	D	Disposals	T	Tackles
B	Behinds	H	Handballs	M	Marks

Season	Team	No.	Games	Totals							Averages (per game)							Votes
Season	Team	No.	Games	G	B	K	H	D	M	T	G	B	K	H	D	M	T	Votes
2022 (S6)	Brisbane	19	3	1	1	8	6	14	1	7	0.3	0.3	2.7	2.0	4.7	0.3	2.3	0
2022 (S7)	Brisbane	19	0	—	—	—	—	—	—	—	—	—	—	—	—	—	—	0
2023	Brisbane	19	0	—	—	—	—	—	—	—	—	—	—	—	—	—	—	0
2024	Brisbane	19	2	1	1	11	10	21	0	4	0.5	0.5	5.5	5.0	10.5	0.0	2.0	0
Career			5	2	2	19	16	35	1	11	0.4	0.4	3.8	3.2	7.0	0.2	2.2	0
