= Annise Bradfield =

Australian rules football player

Personal information
- Full name: Annise Bradfield
- Born: 9 December 2002 (age 23); Gold Coast, Queensland
- Original team: Bond University (QAFLW)
- Draft: No. 7, 2020 AFL Women's draft
- Debut: Round 1, 2021, Gold Coast vs. Melbourne, at Metricon Stadium
- Height: 172 cm (5 ft 8 in)
- Position: Forward

Playing career^{1}
Years	Club	Games (Goals)
2021–S7 (2022)	Gold Coast	5 (0)
2023–2024	Greater Western Sydney	3 (0)
Total		8 (0)
- ^{1} Playing statistics correct to the end of the 2024 season.

Annise Bradfield (born 9 December 2002) is a former Australian rules footballer who played for the GWS Giants and Gold Coast in the AFL Women's competition (AFLW).

== Early life ==
Bradfield grew up on the Gold Coast and was a high level field hockey in her younger years. At the age of 12, her neighbour convinced her to begin playing Australian rules football for the Labrador Tigers. A year later Bradfield switched clubs to the Southport Sharks where she became an outstanding junior prospect. She signed with the Gold Coast Suns Academy as a teenager. She switched to the Bond University Football Club in her final year of junior football in order to compete in the top level QAFLW competition.

Bradfield attended Southport State High School throughout her upbringing and was taught P.E. by future Suns teammate Jamie Stanton.

== AFLW career ==
Bradfield was drafted with pick 7 in the 2020 AFL Women's draft, and made her AFLW debut for Gold Coast in Round 1 of the 2021 AFLW season.

In March 2023, Bradfield was delisted by Gold Coast, having played five matches while coping with a knee injury.

In April 2023, Bradfield was drafted by the GWS Giants in the 2023 AFL Women's supplementary draft. She suffered a Lisfranc injury during the pre-season and didn't manage a game that year.

She announced her retirement in November 2024 due to a chronic knee injury.
