= McKenzie Dowrick =

Australian rules footballer

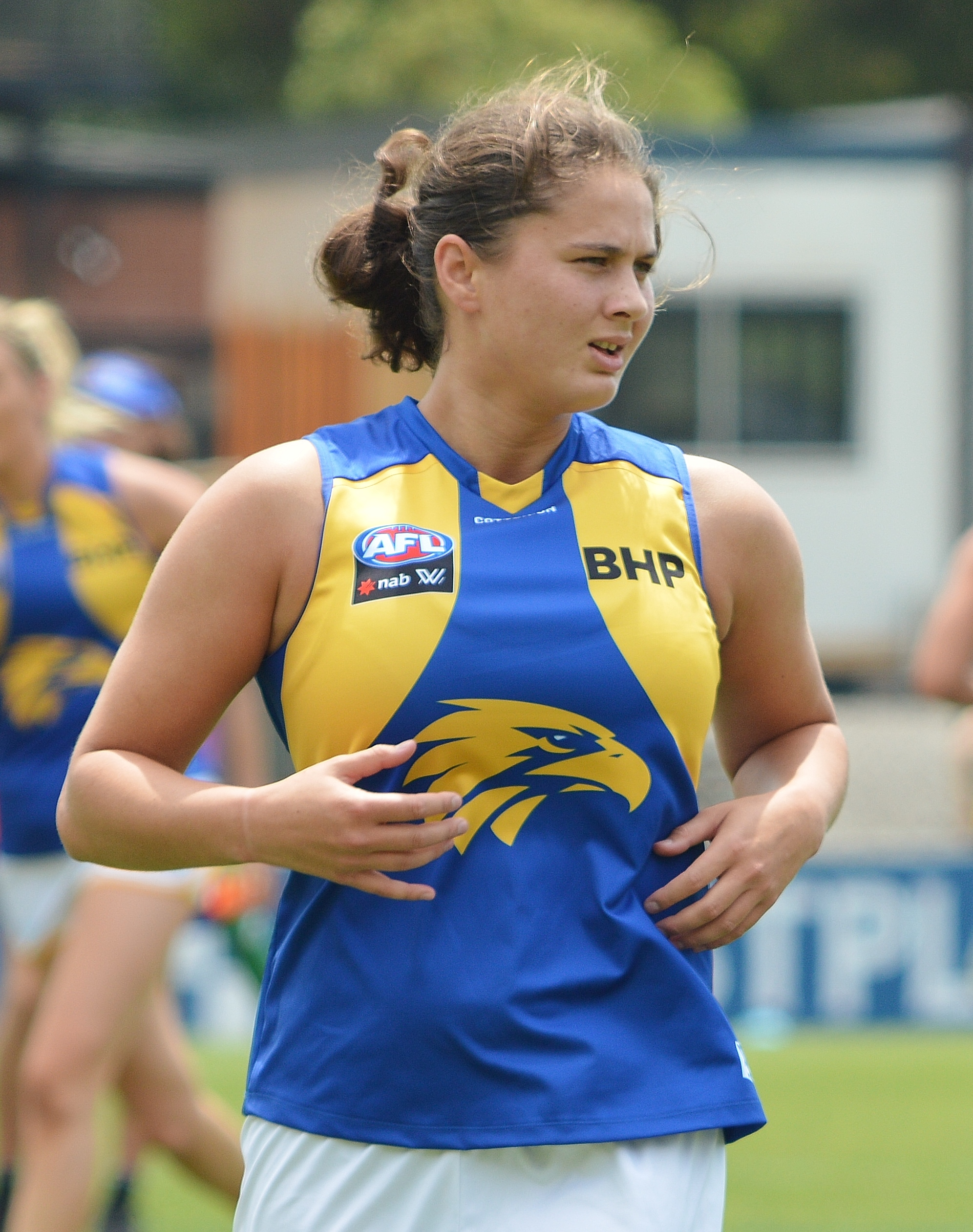
- Dowrick with West Coast in 2020

Personal information
- Born: 7 March 2000 (age 26)
- Original team: Subiaco (WAWFL)
- Draft: No. 33, 2018 AFL Women's draft
- Debut: Round 1, 2019, Brisbane vs. Greater Western Sydney, at Moreton Bay Central Sports Complex
- Height: 172 cm (5 ft 8 in)
- Position: Forward

Playing career^{1}
Years	Club	Games (Goals)
2019	Brisbane	7 (0)
2020–2021	West Coast	5 (1)
2022 (S6)–2023	Adelaide	4 (4)
Total		16 (5)
- ^{1} Playing statistics correct to the end of the 2023 season.

McKenzie Dowrick (born 7 March 2000) is an Australian rules footballer who has played for Brisbane, West Coast and Adelaide in the AFL Women's competition (AFLW).

Dowrick was playing for Subiaco in the West Australian Women's Football League when she was drafted by Brisbane with the 33rd pick in the 2018 AFL Women's draft. She made her debut in the Lions' round 1 game against Greater Western Sydney at Moreton Bay Central Sports Complex on 3 February 2019.

In April 2019, Dowrick was traded to expansion club West Coast. In June 2021, she was delisted by West Coast.

In January 2022, Dowrick was signed by Adelaide as a replacement player in place of Deni Varnhagen who was inactive due to refusing to be vaccinated against COVID-19. After making one appearance for the club she was delisted, but later re-drafted with pick #71 ahead of 2022 season 7. She was placed on the inactive list for the 2023 season due to an ACL injury before being delisted at the end of the season.
