= Alison Brown (footballer) =

Australian rules footballer

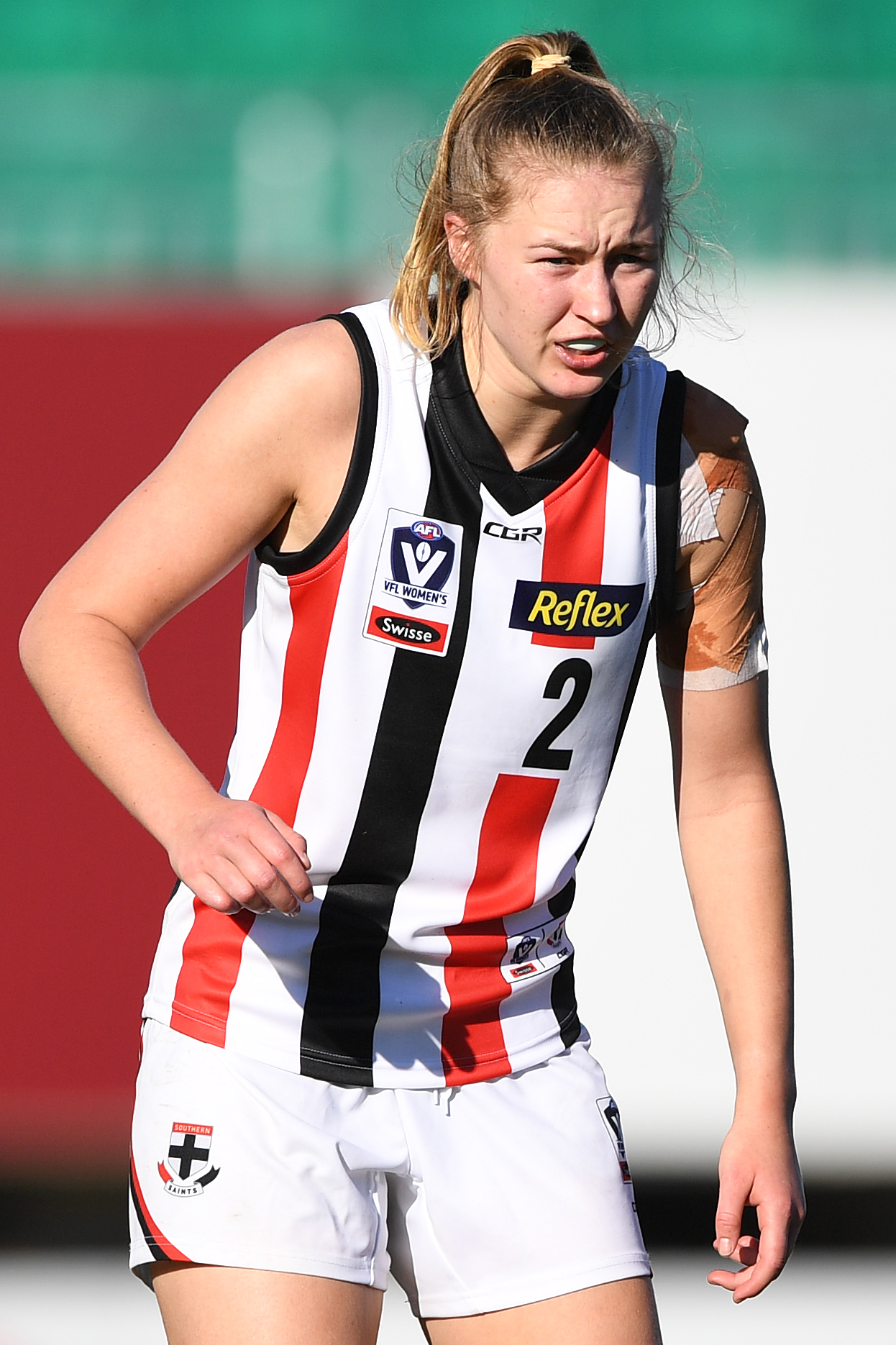
- Brown in May 2019

Personal information
- Born: 21 September 1997 (age 29)
- Original team: St Kilda Sharks (VFL Women's)
- Draft: 2016 free agent: Carlton
- Debut: Round 1, 2017, Carlton vs. Collingwood, at Ikon Park
- Height: 179 cm (5 ft 10 in)
- Position: Midfielder

Playing career^{1}
| Years | Club | Games (Goals) |
| 2017 | Carlton | 7 (0) |
| 2020–2021 | St Kilda | 11 (0) |
| 2022–S7 (2022) | Melbourne | 4 (0) |
| Total | | 22 (0) |
- ^{1} Playing statistics correct to the end of S7 (2022).

Alison Brown (born 21 September 1997) is an Australian rules footballer who plays for Melbourne in the AFL Women's competition (AFLW). She was recruited by Carlton as a free agent following the 2016 AFL Women's draft. She made her debut in Round 1, 2017, in the club and the league's inaugural match at Ikon Park against Collingwood. Brown finished 2017 having played in all seven possible matches with Carlton. She was subsequently delisted at season's end. On 29 January 2019, Brown was announced as the first AFLW signing for the St Kilda Football Club Women's Team, who officially entered the AFL Women's competition in 2020. In March 2021, St Kilda announced they delisted Brown after playing 11 matches for the club. In the 2021 AFL Women's draft, Melbourne drafted her with the 45th pick after she played 12 games for Casey Demons in the VFL Women's. She was educated at Caulfield Grammar School. In December 2022, Brown was delisted by Melbourne.
