= Phoebe Monahan =

Australian rules footballer

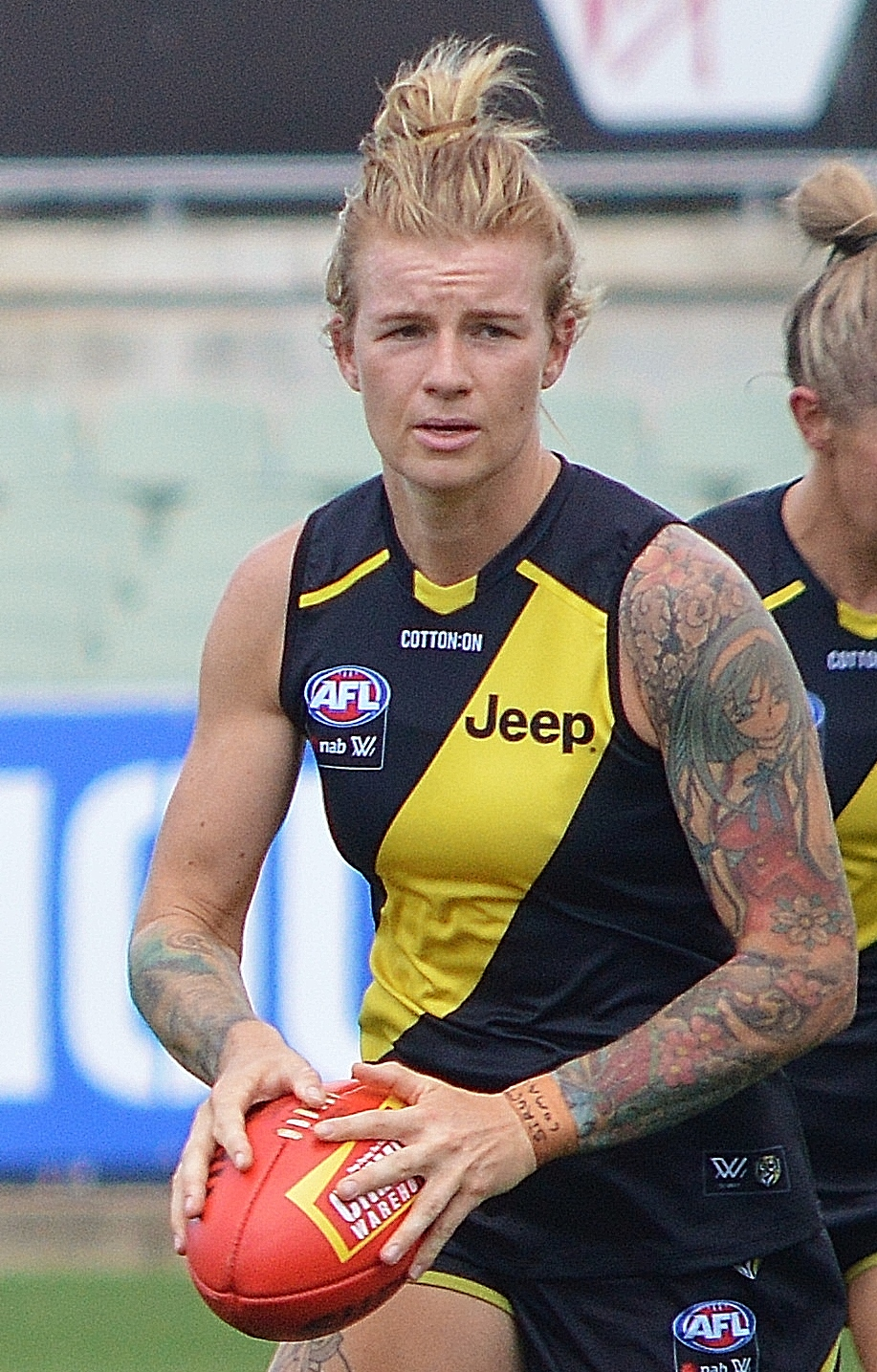
- Monahan with Richmond in February 2020

Personal information
- Nickname: Pheebs
- Born: 3 July 1993 (age 33)
- Original team: UNSW-Eastern Suburbs Stingrays (SWAFL)
- Draft: No. 39, 2017 AFL Women's draft
- Debut: Round 2, 2018, Greater Western Sydney vs. Carlton, at Drummoyne Oval
- Height: 174 cm (5 ft 9 in)
- Position: Defender

Playing career^{1}
Years	Club	Games (Goals)
2018–2019	Greater Western Sydney	10 (0)
2020–2021	Richmond	12 (0)
2022 (S6)–2023	Brisbane	38 (0)
Total		60 (0)
- ^{1} Playing statistics correct to the end of the 2023 season.

Career highlights
- AFLW premiership player: 2023

Phoebe Monahan (born 3 July 1993) is a former Australian rules footballer who played for Greater Western Sydney, Richmond and Brisbane in the AFL Women's (AFLW). She won a premiership with Brisbane in 2023.

== Early life and state-league football ==
Monahan hails from the regional Victorian city of Geelong, where she played school football with Clonard College. At age 18, Monahan began playing with the North Geelong Football Club in the Victorian Women's Football League where she remained for three seasons.

After moving to Sydney to become a sapper in the Australian Defence Force, Monahan took up playing matches with the Army team in intra-defence force matches and then later played for the UNSW-Eastern Suburbs Stingrays in the state-league level AFL Sydney Women's Premier League in 2016. She won premierships there in both 2016 and 2017, and in 2017 she placed third in the league best and fairest award while playing as a midfielder.

== AFL Women's career ==
=== Greater Western Sydney ===
Monahan was drafted by Greater Western Sydney with the club's fourth selection and the thirty-ninth pick overall in the 2017 AFL Women's draft. She made her debut in the twenty-one point loss to Carlton at Drummoyne Oval in round 2 of the 2018 season and finished the season having played six matches.

She spent the off-season playing matches for the ADF representative side, as well as with Richmond in the VFL Women's where she finished third in the club's best and fairest count. Following that, Monahan returned to the Giants for the 2019 AFL Women's season and played a further four matches, taking her two-year tally to 10.

=== Richmond ===
In the 2019 expansion period, Monahan signed a free-agency deal to join Richmond's newly formed AFLW team.

Prior to the start of the season, Monahan was appointed to the club's four person leadership group as co-deputy vice captain.

In June 2021, Monahan was delisted by Richmond along with Alana Woodward.

=== Brisbane ===
A fortnight after being delisted by Richmond, Monahan joined Brisbane as a delisted free agent. She played 38 games for the Lions as a regular fixture in their backline for three seasons. She won a premiership with them in 2023, shortly after which she announced her retirement from football.

== Statistics ==
Legend
G	Goals	K	Kicks	D	Disposals	T	Tackles
B	Behinds	H	Handballs	M	Marks

Season	Team	No.	Games	Totals							Averages (per game)							Votes
Season	Team	No.	Games	G	B	K	H	D	M	T	G	B	K	H	D	M	T	Votes
2018	Greater Western Sydney	28	6	0	0	38	9	47	4	17	0.0	0.0	6.3	1.5	7.8	0.7	2.8	0
2019	Greater Western Sydney	28	4	0	0	15	13	28	0	8	0.0	0.0	3.8	3.3	7.0	0.0	2.0	0
2020	Richmond	2	6	0	1	84	19	103	16	17	0.0	0.2	14.0	3.2	17.2	2.7	2.8	0
2021	Richmond	2	6	0	0	40	13	53	11	10	0.0	0.0	6.7	2.2	8.8	1.8	1.7	0
2022 (S6)	Brisbane	11	12	0	0	87	28	115	21	36	0.0	0.0	7.3	2.3	9.6	1.8	3.0	2
2022 (S7)	Brisbane	11	13	0	0	84	31	115	41	16	0.0	0.0	6.5	2.4	8.8	3.2	1.2	0
2023	Brisbane	11	13	0	0	66	35	101	29	27	0.0	0.0	5.1	2.7	7.8	2.2	2.1	0
Career			60	0	1	414	148	562	122	131	0.0	0.0	6.9	2.5	9.4	2.0	2.2	2

== Personal life ==
Outside of football, Monahan works as a carpenter in the Australian Army.
