= Stephanie Williams (Australian footballer) =

Australian rules footballer (born 2002)

Personal information
- Full name: Stephanie Williams
- Born: 27 January 2002 (age 24); Darwin, Northern Territory
- Original teams: Darwin Football Club (NTFL), Geelong Falcons (NAB League Girls)
- Draft: No.27, 2020 AFL Women's draft
- Debut: 6 February 2021, Geelong vs. Collingwood, at Victoria Park
- Height: 171 cm (5 ft 7 in)
- Position: Forward

Playing career^{1}
Years	Club	Games (Goals)
2021–2022	Geelong	4 (0)
S7 (2022)–2023	Richmond	5 (0)
Total		9 (0)
- ^{1} Playing statistics correct to the end of the 2023 season.

Stephanie Williams is an Australian rules footballer playing for Richmond in the AFL Women's league. Williams was recruited by Geelong with the twenty seventh selection in the 2020 AFL Women's draft. Williams is an Indigenous Australian of Larrakia and Iwaidja descent.

== Early football ==
Williams played for the Darwin Football Club in their under 18s division as a junior, where she was named as best on ground in their premiership victory, and later the Geelong Falcons and Central Allies in the professionally run leagues.

== AFLW career ==
Williams debuted for Geelong in the second round of the 2021 AFL Women's season. On debut, Williams collected 5 disposals and 2 tackles. In May 2022, Williams was traded to Richmond in exchange for Ingrid Houtsma.

== Statistics ==
Statistics are correct to the end of the 2021 season.

Legend
G	Goals	K	Kicks	D	Disposals	T	Tackles
B	Behinds	H	Handballs	M	Marks

Season	Team	No.	Games	Totals							Averages (per game)						
Season	Team	No.	Games	G	B	K	H	D	M	T	G	B	K	H	D	M	T
2021	Geelong	25	4	0	1	7	5	12	0	5	0.0	0.5	1.8	1.3	3.0	0.0	1.3
Career			4	0	1	7	5	12	0	5	0.0	0.5	1.8	1.3	3.0	0.0	1.3
