= Kirsten McLeod =

Australian rules footballer

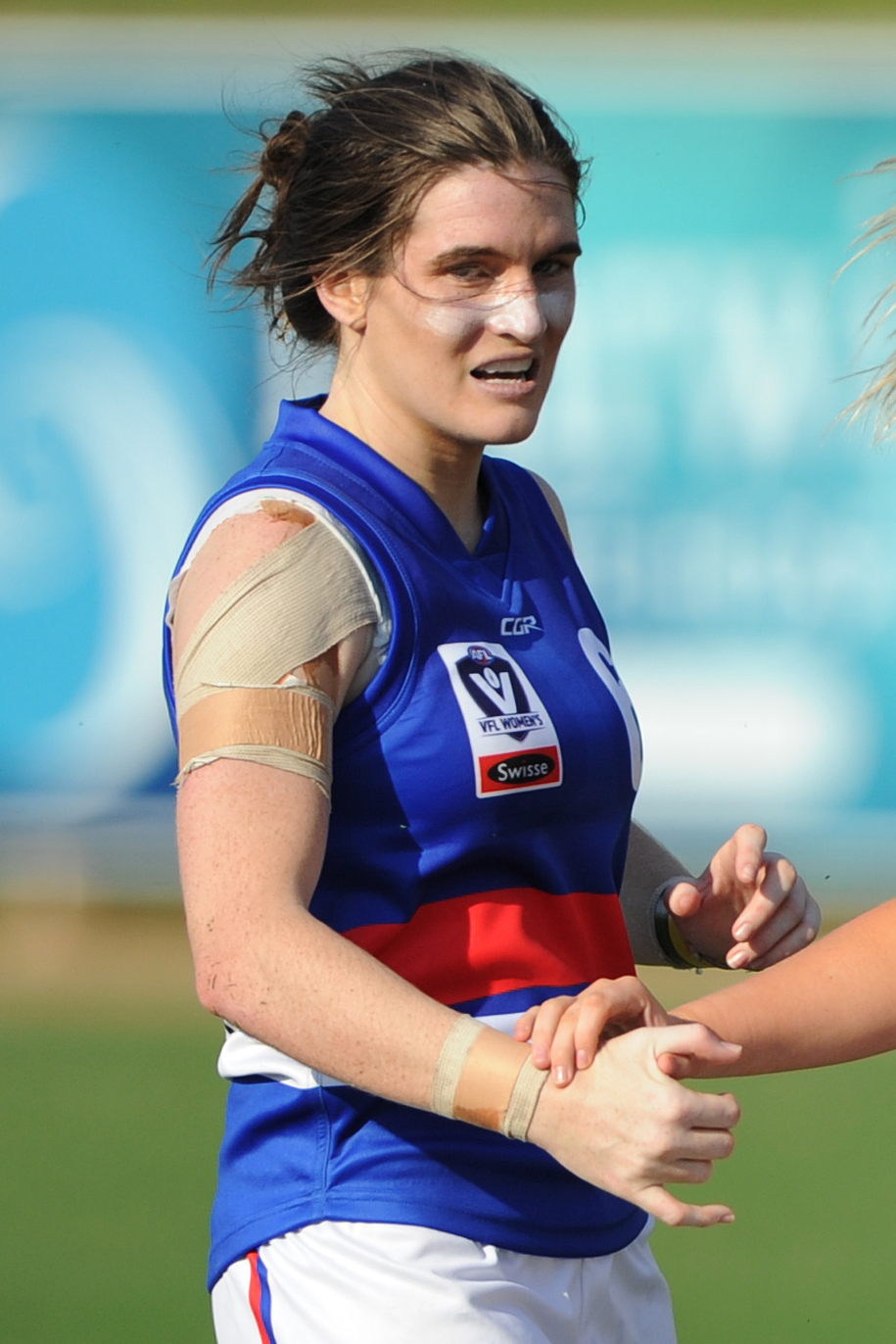
- McLeod in June 2018

Personal information
- Born: 30 May 1994 (age 32)
- Original team: Cranbourne (VFL Women's)
- Draft: No. 28, 2016 AFL Women's draft
- Debut: Round 1, 2017, Western Bulldogs vs. Fremantle, at VU Whitten Oval
- Height: 161 cm (5 ft 3 in)
- Position: Forward

Club information
- Current club: Western Bulldogs
- Number: 6

Playing career^{1}
| Years | Club | Games (Goals) |
| 2017–2023 | Western Bulldogs | 39 (25) |
- ^{1} Playing statistics correct to the end of the 2023 season.

Career highlights
- Western Bulldogs leading goalkicker: 2020; AFLW Premiership Player: 2017

Kirsten McLeod (born 30 May 1994) is an Australian rules footballer playing for the Western Bulldogs in the AFL Women's competition. McLeod was drafted by the Western Bulldogs with their fourth selection and twenty-eighth overall in the 2016 AFL Women's draft. She made her debut in the thirty-two point win against Fremantle at VU Whitten Oval in the opening round of the 2017 season. She played six matches in her debut season and kicked four goals. It was revealed that McLeod had signed a contract extension with the club on 16 June 2021, after playing 8 out 9 possible games for the club that season.

McLeod retired at the end of the 2023 AFL Women's season.

== Statistics ==
Statistics are correct to the end of the 2021 season.

Legend
| G | Goals | K | Kicks | D | Disposals | T | Tackles |
| B | Behinds | H | Handballs | M | Marks |

| Season | Team | No. | Games | Totals | | | | | | | Averages (per game) | | | | | | | Votes |
| Season | Team | No. | Games | G | B | K | H | D | M | T | G | B | K | H | D | M | T | Votes |
|---|---|---|---|---|---|---|---|---|---|---|---|---|---|---|---|---|---|---|
| 2017 | Western Bulldogs | 6 | 6 | 4 | 8 | 26 | 16 | 42 | 3 | 14 | 0.6 | 1.3 | 4.3 | 2.7 | 7.0 | 0.5 | 2.3 | 0 |
| 2018^{#} | Western Bulldogs | 6 | 4 | 3 | 1 | 14 | 3 | 17 | 5 | 10 | 0.8 | 0.3 | 3.5 | 0.8 | 4.3 | 1.3 | 2.5 | 0 |
| 2019 | Western Bulldogs | 6 | 6 | 2 | 5 | 24 | 4 | 28 | 7 | 11 | 0.3 | 0.8 | 4.0 | 0.6 | 4.6 | 1.7 | 1.8 | 0 |
| 2020 | Western Bulldogs | 6 | 6 | 5 | 5 | 38 | 5 | 43 | 13 | 11 | 0.8 | 0.8 | 6.3 | 0.8 | 7.1 | 2.2 | 1.8 | 0 |
| 2021 | Western Bulldogs | 6 | 2 | 7 | 2 | 43 | 6 | 49 | 12 | 17 | 0.9 | 0.3 | 5.4 | 0.8 | 6.1 | 1.5 | 2.1 | 0 |
| Career | | | 30 | 21 | 21 | 145 | 34 | 179 | 40 | 63 | 0.7 | 0.7 | 4.8 | 1.1 | 6.0 | 1.3 | 2.1 | 0 |
