= Lucy Burke =

Australian rules footballer

Personal information
- Born: 30 January 1998 (age 28)
- Original team: Southern Saints (VFLW)
- Draft: Replacement signing in 2021
- Debut: Round 1, 2022 (S6), St Kilda vs. Richmond, at Frankston Park
- Height: 179 cm (5 ft 10 in)
- Position: Defender

Playing career^{1}
Years	Club	Games (Goals)
2022 (S6)–2022 (S7)	St Kilda	12 (1)
2023–2024	North Melbourne	1 (0)
Total		13 (1)
- ^{1} Playing statistics correct to the end of the 2024 season.

Lucy Burke (born 30 January 1998) is a former professional Australian rules footballer who played for the St Kilda Football Club and the North Melbourne Football Club in the AFL Women's (AFLW).

She is not related to former teammate Alice Burke.

== Early career ==
Originally from Melbourne, Australia, Burke was educated at Sandringham College. She then played basketball in the US college system, representing the Coffeyville Red Ravens and majoring in health science at Coffeyville Community College.

In 2021, Burke played for the Southern Saints in the VFL Women's. She was named in the VFLW Team of the Year and led the Saints to a maiden grand final appearance.

== AFL Women's career ==
Signed from the VFLW Saints, Burke joined St Kilda ahead of the 2022 AFL Women's season as a replacement player for Paige Price. She made her debut in the round one match against Richmond at Frankston Park. She kicked her first goal in a two-point win over Port Adelaide in round nine of season seven.

Burke was signed to North Melbourne ahead of the 2023 season. She played her first and only game for North Melbourne in the round 2 match against Geelong. She found herself listed among the emergencies of the squad that lost to Brisbane in the 2023 Grand Final. Burke was delisted by the Kangaroos at the conclusion of the 2023 season, but following a commitment to be resigned, was relisted with pick 46 in the 2023 national draft.

Following the conclusion of her contract in 2024, Burke joined Carlton in the VFLW. She nominated for the 2025 national draft but was overlooked.

== Statistics ==
Updated to the end of the 2024 season.

Legend
G	Goals	K	Kicks	D	Disposals	T	Tackles
B	Behinds	H	Handballs	M	Marks

Season	Team	No.	Games	Totals							Averages (per game)						
Season	Team	No.	Games	G	B	K	H	D	M	T	G	B	K	H	D	M	T
2022 (S6)	St Kilda	30	6	0	0	12	12	24	5	12	0.0	0.0	2.0	2.0	4.0	0.8	2.0
2022 (S7)	St Kilda	30	6	1	1	12	17	29	5	13	0.2	0.2	2.0	2.8	4.8	0.8	2.2
2023	North Melbourne	29	0	–	–	–	–	–	–	–	–	–	–	–	–	–	–
2024	North Melbourne	29	1	0	0	2	0	2	4	1	0.0	0.0	2.0	0.0	2.0	4.0	1.0
Career			17	2	5	57	74	131	24	52	0.1	0.3	3.4	4.4	7.7	1.4	3.1
