= Zoe Prowse =

- Prowse with Adelaide in 2025

Personal information
- Full name: Zoe Prowse
- Nickname: Zog
- Born: 3 July 2003 (age 23)
- Original teams: Sturt (SANFL); Glenunga, Mt Lofty (Adelaide Footy League)
- Draft: No. 17, 2021 draft
- Debut: Round 10, 2022 ^{(S6)}, Adelaide vs. St Kilda, at Moorabbin Oval
- Height: 177 cm (5 ft 10 in)
- Position: Defender

Club information
- Current club: Essendon
- Number: 26

Playing career^{1}
Years	Club	Games (Goals)
2022 ^{(S6)}–2025	Adelaide	47 (4)
2026–	Essendon	0 (0)
- ^{1} Playing statistics correct to the end of 2025.

Career highlights
- 22under22 team: 2024

Zoe Prowse (born 3 July 2003) is a professional Australian rules football player who currently plays for Essendon in the AFL Women's (AFLW).

== AFL Women's career ==
Prowse was drafted to the Adelaide Crows from Sturt with pick 17 in the 2021 draft. Drafted as a ruck, Prowse made her debut in round 10, 2022 (season six). She was omitted during the finals series and missed out on a first-year premiership as the Crows defeated Melbourne in the Grand Final.

Prior to the 2023 season, Prowse underwent surgery on her Achilles' tendon. It was an injury she quickly overcame, as she went on to receive back-to-back awards at Adelaide as the club's best defensive player in 2023 and 2024, the club reaching preliminary finals in both years. She also earned her first selection in the 22under22 team, being the central key defender in the representative 2024 side.
