= Talent League Girls =

Under-19 girls Australian rules football competition

Coates Talent League Girls
- Formerly: TAC Cup Girls (2017–2018); NAB League Girls (2019–2022)
- Sport: Australian rules football
- First season: 2017
- No. of teams: 13
- Country: Australia
- Most recent champion: Dandenong Stingrays (1)
- Most titles: Oakleigh Chargers (3)
- Website: afl.com.au/talent-league

The Talent League Girls (also known as the Coates Talent League Girls under naming rights and previously as the NAB League Girls and TAC Cup Girls) is an under-19 Australian rules football representative competition held in Australia. It is based on geographic regions throughout country Victoria and metropolitan Melbourne with each team representing twelve Victorian regions, while a thirteenth team from Tasmania was introduced in 2019.

The league is one of the leading competitions for female footballers to be recruited to AFL Women's (AFLW) clubs. An identical competition for male footballers, known as the Talent League Boys, is also contested on an annual basis.

== History ==
The league was inaugurated in 2017, the same year as the first AFL Women's premiership season was held. All NAB League Boys clubs entered teams and shared training grounds. Reaction to the establishment was positive, with Fiona Richardson, Victorian Minister for Women, praising the league for its encouragement of women's sports. Carlton vice-captain Madeline Keryk said the competition helped equalise opportunities for boys and girls in junior football.

The first season was a five-round competition. The Calder Cannons won all five of their matches and overcame the Murray Bushrangers on percentage to claim the inaugural premiership. The second season was a nine-round competition culminating in a grand final. The inaugural grand finalists were the Geelong Falcons and the Northern Knights. The Falcons won 32–21, completing an unbeaten season. The competition has since grown in fixture length and incorporates a team from Tasmania. The 2020 season was abandoned due to the impact of the COVID-19 pandemic.

The league was known as the TAC Cup Girls in 2017 to 2018, NAB League Girls in 2019 to 2022, and since 2023 it has been known as the Coates Talent League Girls.

== Age eligibility ==
The competition was originally classified as an under-18 competition, though in 2021 the competition was classified as an under-19 competition. The draft age for both the AFL and AFLW Draft is 18. Since 2023 the league has been primarily by under-18 players, with a selection of under-19 players also listed.

== Clubs ==
Club	Colours	State	Home venue	Est.	Seasons		Premierships	
Club	Colours	State	Home venue	Est.	First	Total	Total	Recent
Bendigo Pioneers		VIC	Queen Elizabeth Oval	1993	2017	9	0	−
Brisbane Lions (A)		QLD	Brighton Homes Arena	2010	2020	6	Not eligible	
Calder Cannons		VIC	Highgate Recreation Reserve	1995	2017	9	1	2017
Dandenong Stingrays		VIC	Shepley Oval	1992	2017	9	1	2026
Eastern Ranges		VIC	Kilsyth Recreation Reserve	1992	2017	9	1	2025
Geelong Falcons		VIC	Chirnside Park	1992	2017	9	1	2018
Gippsland Power		VIC	Morwell Recreation Reserve	1993	2017	9	0	−
Gold Coast Suns (A)		QLD	Carrara Stadium	2010	2020	6	Not eligible	
Greater Western Sydney Giants (A)		NSW	Sydney Showground Stadium	2010	2021	4	Not eligible	
Greater Western Victoria Rebels		VIC	Eureka Stadium	1993	2017	9	0	−
Murray Bushrangers		VIC	Norm Minns Oval, Wangaratta	1993	2017	9	0	−
Northern Knights		VIC	Preston City Oval	1992	2017	9	1	2019
Northern Territory Thunder		NT	Marrara Oval	1979	2020	6	Not eligible	
Oakleigh Chargers		VIC	Warrawee Park	1995	2017	9	3	2024
Sandringham Dragons		VIC	Trevor Barker Beach Oval	1992	2017	9	0	−
Sydney Swans (A)		NSW	Sydney Cricket Ground	2010	2021	4	Not eligible	
Tasmania Devils		TAS	Bellerive Oval; York Park	2019	2019	7	0	−
Western Jets		VIC	Williamstown Cricket Ground	1992	2017	9	1	2022

== Premiers ==
Season	Premiers	Runners-up	Grand Final score	Venue	Ref.	Best on Ground
2017	Calder Cannons	Murray Bushrangers	None	No venue		None
2018	Geelong Falcons	Northern Knights	4.8 (32) – 3.3 (21)	Avalon Airport Oval		Denby Taylor
2019	Northern Knights	Calder Cannons	6.3 (39) – 0.6 (6)	Ikon Park		Jess Fitzgerald
2020	No premiership awarded due to the COVID-19 pandemic					
2021	Oakleigh Chargers	Geelong Falcons	11.5 (71) – 5.4 (34)	Avalon Airport Oval		Amanda Ling
2022	Western Jets	Dandenong Stingrays	7.5 (47) – 5.11 (41)	Avalon Airport Oval		Amber Clarke
2023	Oakleigh Chargers	Eastern Ranges	6.7 (43) – 5.6 (36)	Ikon Park		Sienna Tallariti
2024	Oakleigh Chargers	Eastern Ranges	5.7 (37) – 2.7 (19)	Ikon Park		Sienna Tallariti
2025	Eastern Ranges	Dandenong Stingrays	10.8 (68) – 4.6 (30)	Ikon Park		Tayla McMillan
2026	Dandenong Stingrays	Oakleigh Chargers	9.3 (57) – 3.9 (27)	Whitten Oval		Zoe Zach

== Best and Fairest Award ==
Season	Winner	Club	Ref.
2017	Chloe Molloy	Calder Cannons	
2017	Bridie Kennedy	Dandenong Stingrays	
2018	Maddy Prespakis	Calder Cannons	
2018	Nina Morrison	Geelong Falcons	
2019	Georgie Prespakis	Calder Cannons	
2020	Not awarded due to the COVID-19 pandemic		
2021	Georgie Prespakis	Calder Cannons	
2022	Amber Clarke	Dandenong Stingrays	
2023	Sara Howley	Geelong Falcons	
2024	Ash Centra	Gippsland Power	
2025	Chloe Bown	Oakleigh Chargers	
2026	Peggy Rock	GWV Rebels	
