= 2022 Collingwood Football Club season =

Australian football club season

Collingwood Football Club
2022 season
- President: Jeff Browne
- Coach: See below
- Captain: See below
- Home ground: See below
- Regular season: See below
- Finals series: See below

The 2022 Collingwood Football Club season was the club's 126th season of senior competition in the Australian Football League (AFL). The club also fielded its reserves team in the Victorian Football League and women's teams in the AFL Women's and VFL Women's competitions.

== Overview ==
Collingwood's 2022 season overview
Team	Captain(s)	Coach	Home ground	W–L–D	Ladder	Finals	Best and fairest	Leading goalkicker(s)	Refs
AFL	Scott Pendlebury	Craig McRae	Melbourne Cricket Ground	16–6–0	4th	Preliminary final	Jack Crisp	Brody Mihocek (41)	
AFLW (S6)	Steph Chiocci & Brianna Davey	Stephen Symonds	Victoria Park	6–4–0	6th	Qualifying final	Jaimee Lambert	Chloe Molloy (8)	
AFLW (S7)	Steph Chiocci & Brianna Davey	Stephen Symonds	Victoria Park	7–3–0	6th	Semi-final	Jordyn Allen	Eliza James (10)	
VFL	Lachlan Tardrew & Campbell Hustwaite	Craig Black	Victoria Park & AIA Centre	11–7–0	6th	Elimination final	Finlay Macrae	Sam Fowler (25)	
VFLW	Caitlin Bunker	Chloe McMillan	Victoria Park	7–7–0	6th	Elimination final	Matilda Zander	Matilda Zander & Nyakoat Dojiok (9)	

== AFL squad ==
Players are listed by guernsey number, and 2022 statistics are for AFL regular season and finals series matches during the 2022 AFL season only. Career statistics include a player's complete AFL career, which, as a result, means that a player's debut and part or whole of their career statistics may be for another club. Statistics are correct as of the 2nd Preliminary final of the 2022 season (17 September 2022) and are taken from AFL Tables.

No.	Name	AFL debut	Games (2022)	Goals (2022)	Games (CFC)	Goals (CFC)	Games (AFL career)	Goals (AFL career)
1	Patrick Lipinski	2017 (Western Bulldogs)	25	9	25	9	81	39
2	Jordan De Goey	2015	19	18	137	173	137	173
3	Isaac Quaynor	2019	24	2	59	3	59	3
4	Brodie Grundy	2013	6	2	177	60	177	60
5	Jamie Elliott	2012	19	28	155	227	155	227
6	Tyler Brown	2020	11	2	27	4	27	4
7	Josh Daicos	2017	25	15	77	41	77	41
8	Trent Bianco	2021	10	1	22	8	22	8
9	John Noble	2019	25	0	69	4	69	4
10	Scott Pendlebury (c)	2006	24	2	358	185	358	185
12	Tom Wilson	2021	3	2	7	2	7	2
13	Taylor Adams	2012 (Greater Western Sydney)	18	2	152	51	183	63
14	Darcy Cameron	2018 (Sydney)	24	20	52	46	53	46
15	Nathan Kreuger	2021 (Geelong)	5	4	5	4	7	4
16	Oliver Henry	2021	15	21	25	28	25	28
17	Callum Brown	2017	6	1	70	23	70	23
18	Finlay Macrae	2021	2	0	11	1	11	1
19	Arlo Draper	****	0	0	0	0	0	0
20	Will Kelly	2020	0	0	3	1	3	1
21	Trey Ruscoe	2020	4	0	17	7	17	7
22	Steele Sidebottom	2009	25	12	289	186	289	186
23	Jordan Roughead	2010 (Western Bulldogs)	1	0	63	1	201	35
24	Caleb Poulter	2021	1	0	12	2	12	2
25	Jack Crisp	2012 (Brisbane Lions)	25	12	182	53	200	63
26	Reef McInnes	2022	6	3	6	3	6	3
27	Cooper Murley	****	0	0	0	0	0	0
28	Nathan Murphy	2018	16	0	33	1	33	1
29	Liam McMahon	****	0	0	0	0	0	0
30	Darcy Moore	2015	24	2	126	67	126	67
31	Beau McCreery	2021	22	14	35	25	35	25
32	Will Hoskin-Elliott	2012 (Greater Western Sydney)	24	14	129	117	181	159
33	Jack Ginnivan	2021	24	39	28	46	28	46
34	Isaac Chugg	2022	2	0	2	0	2	0
35	Nick Daicos	2022	25	7	25	7	25	7
36	Harvey Harrison	****	0	0	0	0	0	0
37	Brayden Maynard	2015	23	1	161	17	161	17
38	Jeremy Howe	2011 (Melbourne)	24	1	119	11	219	91
39	Aiden Begg	2022	3	0	3	0	3	0
40	Ash Johnson	2022	9	15	9	15	9	15
41	Brody Mihocek	2018	23	41	102	165	102	165
43	Charlie Dean	****	0	0	0	0	0	0
44	Jack Madgen	2018	9	1	49	2	49	2
45	Josh Carmichael	2022	7	4	7	4	7	4
46	Mason Cox	2016	18	7	94	100	94	100

Additionally to the regular squad, due to COVID-19, the club was allowed to have 20 top-up players on standby who can be used if there are only 25 players left available from the regular squad. Collingwood listed players from their VFL squad, including former Melbourne player Neville Jetta who joined the club as a developmental coach.

=== Squad changes ===
==== In ====
No.	Name	Position	Previous club	via
15	(South Australia) Nathan Kreuger	Forward	Geelong	trade
1	(Victoria (state)) Patrick Lipinski	Forward	Western Bulldogs	trade
35	(Victoria (state)) Nick Daicos	Midfielder	Oakleigh Chargers	AFL national draft, first round (pick No. 4)
19	(South Australia) Arlo Draper	Midfielder	South Adelaide	AFL national draft, third round (pick No. 45)
27	(South Australia) Cooper Murley	Midfielder	Norwood	AFL national draft, third round (pick No. 49)
36	(South Australia) Harvey Harrison	Midfielder / Forward	North Adelaide	AFL national draft, third round (pick No. 52)
43	(Victoria (state)) Charlie Dean	Defender	Williamstown	AFL rookie draft, first round (pick No. 2)
34	(Tasmania) Isaac Chugg	Midfielder / Defender	Collingwood	AFL rookie draft, second round (pick No. 20)
45	(South Australia) Josh Carmichael	Midfielder	West Adelaide	AFL mid-season rookie draft, first round (pick No. 9)

==== Out ====
No.	Name	Position	New Club	via
16	(Western Australia) Chris Mayne	Forward		retired
43	(Republic of Ireland) Anton Tohill	Defender		retired
15	(Victoria (state)) Max Lynch	Ruck	Hawthorn	trade
24	(Queensland) Josh Thomas	Midfielder		retired
36	(Victoria (state)) Brayden Sier	Midfielder		delisted
1	(Victoria (state)) Jay Rantall	Midfielder		delisted
34	(Tasmania) Isaac Chugg	Midfielder / Defender		delisted
11	(Republic of Ireland) Mark Keane	Defender		delisted
23	(Victoria (state)) Jordan Roughead	Defender		retired

== AFL season ==
=== Pre-season matches ===
Collingwood's 2022 practice match and AAMI Community Series fixtures
Date and local time	Opponent	Scores^{[a]}			Venue	Ref
Date and local time	Opponent	Home	Away	Result	Venue	Ref
Friday, 25 February (4:00 pm)	Hawthorn	22.9 (141)	19.27 (141)	Draw^{[b]}	Morwell Recreation Reserve [H]	
Sunday, 6 March (12:40 pm)	Greater Western Sydney	15.10 (100)	8.11 (59)	Lost by 41 points	GIANTS Stadium [A]	

=== Regular season ===
Collingwood's 2022 AFL season fixture
Round	Date and local time	Opponent	Home	Away	Result	Venue	Attendance	Ladder position	Ref
Round	Date and local time	Opponent	Scores^{[a]}			Venue	Attendance	Ladder position	Ref
1	Friday, 18 March (7:50 pm)	St Kilda	12.13 (85)	15.12 (102)	Won by 17 points	Marvel Stadium [A]	40,129	7th	
2	Saturday, 26 March (1:45 pm)	Adelaide	15.10 (100)	8.10 (58)	Won by 42 points	MCG [H]	36,843	2nd	
3	Saturday, 2 April (7:25 pm)	Geelong	13.13 (91)	16.8 (104)	Lost by 13 points	MCG [H]	52,974	6th	
4	Saturday, 9 April (4:35 pm)	West Coast	10.14 (74)	14.3 (87)	Lost by 13 points	Marvel Stadium [H]	25,897	8th	
5	Thursday, 14 April (7:35 pm)	Brisbane Lions	15.8 (98)	14.7 (91)	Lost by 7 points	Gabba [A]	32,312	9th	
6	Monday, 25 April (3:20 pm)	Essendon	12.10 (82)	15.3 (93)	Won by 11 points	MCG [A]	84,205	8th	
7	Sunday, 1 May (1:10 pm)	Gold Coast	17.13 (115)	14.6 (90)	Won by 25 points	MCG [H]	28,916	8th	
8	Saturday, 7 May (1:45 pm)	Richmond	17.11 (113)	12.14 (86)	Lost by 27 points	MCG [A]	64,481	9th	
9	Friday, 13 May (7:50 pm)	Western Bulldogs	7.9 (51)	14.15 (99)	Lost by 48 points	Marvel Stadium [H]	44,029	11th	
10	Sunday, 22 May (5:20 pm)	Fremantle	6.8 (44)	12.8 (80)	Won by 36 points	Optus Stadium [A]	35,534	10th	
11	Sunday, 29 May (3:20 pm)	Carlton	11.13 (79)	11.9 (75)	Won by 4 points	MCG [H]	80,627	10th	
12	Sunday, 5 June (2:10 pm)	Hawthorn	10.8 (68)	10.12 (72)	Won by 4 points	MCG [A]	43,939	8th	
13	Monday, 13 June (3:20 pm)	Melbourne	12.10 (82)	8.8 (56)	Won by 26 points	MCG [H]	76,059	8th	
14	Bye							9th	Bye
15	Sunday, 26 June (3:20 pm)	Greater Western Sydney	11.22 (88)	12.5 (77)	Won by 11 points	MCG [H]	30,804	7th	
16	Saturday, 2 July (7:25 pm)	Gold Coast	8.14 (62)	9.13 (67)	Won by 5 points	Metricon Stadium [A]	16,027	6th	
17	Saturday, 9 July (1:45 pm)	North Melbourne	13.10 (88)	12.9 (81)	Won by 7 points	MCG [H]	45,039	6th	
18	Saturday, 16 July (1:45 pm)	Adelaide	13.8 (86)	14.7 (91)	Won by 5 points	Adelaide Oval [A]	30,110	5th	
19	Sunday, 24 July (3:20 pm)	Essendon	12.8 (80)	11.10 (76)	Won by 4 points	MCG [H]	72,402	4th	
20	Saturday, 30 July (1:45 pm)	Port Adelaide	13.10 (88)	12.10 (82)	Won by 6 points	MCG [H]	40,716	3rd	
21	Friday, 5 August (7:50 pm)	Melbourne	13.11 (89)	15.6 (96)	Won by 7 points	MCG [A]	70,956	2nd	
22	Sunday, 14 August (3:20 pm)	Sydney	11.11 (77)	7.8 (50)	Lost by 27 points	SCG [A]	44,659	5th	
23	Sunday, 21 August (3:20 pm)	Carlton	10.14 (74)	11.9 (75)	Won by 1 point	MCG [A]	88,287	4th	

=== Finals series ===
Collingwood's 2022 AFL finals series fixtures
Round	Date and local time	Opponent	Home	Away	Result	Venue	Attendance	Ref
Round	Date and local time	Opponent	Scores^{[a]}			Venue	Attendance	Ref
1st Qualifying final	Saturday, 3 September (4:35 pm)	Geelong	11.12 (78)	10.12 (72)	Lost by 6 points	MCG [A]	91,525	
1st Semi-final	Saturday, 10 September (7:25 pm)	Fremantle	11.13 (79)	9.5 (59)	Won by 20 points	MCG [H]	90,612	
2nd Preliminary final	Saturday, 17 September (4:45 pm)	Sydney	14.11 (95)	14.10 (94)	Lost by 1 point	SCG [A]	45,608	
Collingwood was eliminated from the 2022 AFL finals series

=== Ladder ===
Pos	Team	Pld	W	L	D	PF	PA	PP	Pts	Qualification
1	Geelong (P)	22	18	4	0	2146	1488	144.2	72	Finals series
2	Melbourne	22	16	6	0	1936	1483	130.5	64	Finals series
3	Sydney	22	16	6	0	2067	1616	127.9	64	Finals series
4	Collingwood	22	16	6	0	1839	1763	104.3	64	Finals series
5	Fremantle	22	15	6	1	1739	1486	117.0	62	Finals series
6	Brisbane Lions	22	15	7	0	2147	1799	119.3	60	Finals series
7	Richmond	22	13	8	1	2165	1780	121.6	54	Finals series
8	Western Bulldogs	22	12	10	0	1973	1812	108.9	48	Finals series
9	Carlton	22	12	10	0	1857	1714	108.3	48	
10	St Kilda	22	11	11	0	1703	1715	99.3	44	
11	Port Adelaide	22	10	12	0	1806	1638	110.3	40	
12	Gold Coast	22	10	12	0	1871	1820	102.8	40	
13	Hawthorn	22	8	14	0	1787	1991	89.8	32	
14	Adelaide	22	8	14	0	1721	1986	86.7	32	
15	Essendon	22	7	15	0	1737	2087	83.2	28	
16	Greater Western Sydney	22	6	16	0	1631	1927	84.6	24	
17	West Coast	22	2	20	0	1429	2389	59.8	8	
18	North Melbourne	22	2	20	0	1337	2397	55.8	8	

Source: afl.com.au
Rules for classification: 1) points; 2) percentage; 3) number of points for.
(P) Premiers

=== Awards & Milestones ===
==== AFL Awards ====
- Anzac Medal – Jack Ginnivan (Round 6)
- 2022 22under22 selection – Isaac Quaynor
- 2022 22under22 selection – Jack Ginnivan
- 2022 22under22 selection – Nick Daicos
- 2022 AFL Rising Star – Nick Daicos
- AFL Players Association Best Captain – Scott Pendlebury
- AFL Players Association Best First-year Player – Nick Daicos
- 2022 All-Australian team – Brayden Maynard
- AFL Coaches Association Senior Coach of the Year – Craig McRae

==== AFL Award Nominations ====
- Round 3 – 2022 AFL Rising Star nomination – Nick Daicos
- Round 6 – 2022 AFL Rising Star nomination – Jack Ginnivan
- 2022 All-Australian team 44-man squad – Jack Crisp, Josh Daicos, Brayden Maynard

==== Club Awards ====
- E.W. Copeland Trophy – Jack Crisp
- R.T. Rush Trophy – Scott Pendlebury
- J.J. Joyce Trophy – Darcy Moore
- J.F. McHale Trophy – Jeremy Howe
- Jack Regan Trophy – Steele Sidebottom
- Joseph Wren Memorial Trophy – Finlay Macrae
- Darren Millane Memorial Trophy – Brayden Maynard
- Harry Collier Trophy – Nick Daicos
- Gordon Coventry Trophy – Brody Mihocek
- Gavin Brown Award – Beau McCreery

==== Milestones ====
- Round 1 – Nick Daicos (AFL debut)
- Round 1 – Patrick Lipinski (Collingwood debut)
- Round 1 – Jamie Elliott (200 goals)
- Round 2 – Nathan Kreuger (Collingwood debut)
- Round 3 – Reef McInnes (AFL debut)
- Round 5 – Jeremy Howe (200 AFL games, 100 Collingwood games)
- Round 6 – John Noble (50 games)
- Round 7 – Aiden Begg (AFL debut)
- Round 15 – Isaac Chugg (AFL debut)
- Round 15 – Brayden Maynard (150 games)
- Round 16 – Isaac Quaynor (50 games)
- Round 17 – Josh Carmichael (AFL debut)
- Round 18 – Scott Pendlebury (350 games)
- Round 18 – Ash Johnson (AFL debut)
- Round 19 – Taylor Adams (150 Collingwood games)
- Round 21 – Jamie Elliott (150 games)
- Round 23 – Darcy Cameron (50 AFL games)
- Qualifying final – Darcy Cameron (50 Collingwood games)
- Qualifying final – Brody Mihocek (100 games)
- Semi-final – Mason Cox (100 goals)
- Preliminary final – Jack Crisp (200 games)

== VFL season ==
=== Pre-season and practice matches ===
Collingwood's 2022 VFL pre-season fixtures
Date and local time	Opponent	Scores^{[a]}			Venue	Ref
Date and local time	Opponent	Home	Away	Result	Venue	Ref
Saturday, 5 March (2:00 pm)	Essendon	69	54	Won by 15 points	AIA Centre [H]	
Friday, 18 March (4:00 pm)	Sandringham				AIA Centre [H]	

Collingwood's 2022 VFL practice matches
Date and local time	Opponent	Scores^{[a]}			Venue	Ref
Date and local time	Opponent	Home	Away	Result	Venue	Ref
Saturday, 21 May (3:00 pm)	NAB AFL Academy	6.9 (45)	10.6 (67)	Won by 22 points	Skybus Stadium [A]	

=== Regular season ===
Collingwood's 2022 VFL season fixture
Round	Date and local time	Opponent	Home	Away	Result	Venue	Ladder position	Ref
Round	Date and local time	Opponent	Scores^{[a]}			Venue	Ladder position	Ref
1	Sunday, 27 March (12:00 pm)	Box Hill	18.4 (112)	17.8 (110)	Won by 2 points	AIA Centre [H]	10th	
2	Saturday, 2 April (2:05 pm)	Geelong	15.10 (100)	11.12 (78)	Won by 22 points	Victory Park [H]	5th	
3	Saturday, 9 April (12:05 pm)	Northern Bullants	8.14 (62)	14.13 (97)	Won by 35 points	Preston City Oval [A]	4th	
4	Saturday, 16 April (2:05 pm)	Greater Western Sydney	12.7 (79)	14.12 (96)	Lost by 17 points	AIA Centre [H]	5th	
5	Monday, 25 April (1:05 pm)	Essendon	10.13 (73)	20.11 (131)	Won by 58 points	Windy Hill [A]	5th	
6	Saturday, 30 April (1:05 pm)	Coburg	2.10 (22)	18.18 (121)	Won by 99 points	Piranha Park [A]	4th	
7	Bye						3rd	Bye
8	Saturday, 14 May (2:05 pm)	Footscray	13.12 (90)	4.11 (35)	Won by 55 points	AIA Centre [H]	2nd	
9	Bye						2nd	Bye
10	Sunday, 29 May (12:00 pm)	Werribee	16.13 (109)	8.6 (54)	Lost by 55 points	Avalon Airport Oval [A]	4th	
11	Sunday, 5 June (11:05 am)	Gold Coast	15.7 (97)	18.9 (117)	Lost by 20 points	AIA Centre [H]	7th	
12	Sunday, 12 June (2:10 pm)	Casey	14.10 (94)	6.6 (42)	Lost by 52 points	Casey Fields [A]	8th	
13	Bye						9th	Bye
14	Saturday, 25 June (1:05 pm)	Brisbane	11.6 (72)	14.13 (97)	Lost by 25 points	AIA Centre [H]	10th	
15	Sunday, 3 July (11:05 am)	Richmond	11.14 (80)	12.12 (84)	Won by 4 points	Swinburne Centre [A]	9th	
16	Saturday, 9 July (11:05 am)	North Melbourne	9.12 (66)	7.6 (48)	Won by 18 points	AIA Centre [H]	8th	
17	Sunday, 17 July (12:00 pm)	Port Melbourne	11.9 (75)	16.12 (108)	Won by 33 points	ETU Stadium [A]	5th	
18	Bye						7th	Bye
19	Saturday, 30 July (10:35 am)	Southport	13.10 (88)	6.14 (50)	Won by 38 points	Victory Park [H]	6th	
20	Saturday, 6 August (12:35 pm)	Williamstown	22.8 (140)	9.8 (62)	Won by 78 points	AIA Centre [H]	5th	
21	Sunday, 14 August (11:35 am)	Sydney	10.7 (67)	9.10 (64)	Lost by 3 points	SCG [A]	6th	
22	Sunday, 21 August (12:00 pm)	Carlton	7.9 (51)	5.11 (41)	Lost by 10 points	Ikon Park [A]	6th	

=== Finals series ===
Collingwood's 2022 VFL finals series fixture
Round	Date and local time	Opponent	Home	Away	Result	Venue	Ref
Round	Date and local time	Opponent	Scores^{[a]}			Venue	Ref
2nd Elimination Final	Sunday, 28 August (1:05 pm)	Carlton	10.8 (68)	15.10 (100)	Lost by 32 points	Victoria Park [H]	
Collingwood was eliminated from the 2022 VFL finals series

=== Ladder ===
Pos	Team	Pld	W	L	D	PF	PA	PP	Pts	Qualification
4	Sydney (R)	18	13	5	0	1560	1194	130.7	52	Finals series
5	Gold Coast (R)	18	12	6	0	1681	1621	103.7	48	Finals series
6	Collingwood (R)	18	11	7	0	1591	1326	120.0	44	Finals series
7	Carlton (R)	18	11	7	0	1416	1190	119.0	44	Finals series
8	Box Hill	18	11	7	0	1603	1358	118.0	44	Finals series

Source: AFL
Rules for classification: 1) points; 2) percentage; 3) number of points for
(R) = Reserves

== AFLW seasons ==
=== 2022 AFL Women's season 6 (January to April) ===
==== Pre-season matches ====
Collingwood's 2022 AFLW pre-season 6 fixture
Date and time	Opponent	Home	Away	Result	Venue	Ref
Date and time	Opponent	Scores^{[a]}			Venue	Ref
Saturday, 18 December (10:00 am)	Melbourne	6.5 (41)	3.4 (22)	Lost by 19 points	Casey Fields [A]	

==== Regular season ====
Collingwood's 2022 AFL Women's season 6 fixture
Round	Date and time	Opponent	Home	Away	Result	Venue	Attendance	Ladder position	Ref
Round	Date and time	Opponent	Scores^{[a]}			Venue	Attendance	Ladder position	Ref
1	Sunday, 9 January (4:10 pm)	Carlton	3.7 (25)	6.8 (44)	Won by 19 points	Ikon Park [A]	3,511	5th	
2	Saturday, 15 January (3:10 pm)	St Kilda	6.5 (41)	2.2 (14)	Won by 27 points	Victoria Park [H]	2,546	3rd	
3	Friday, 21 January (7:10 pm)	Geelong	3.6 (24)	5.5 (35)	Won by 11 points	GMHBA Stadium [A]	2,265	4th	
4	Thursday, 27 January (5:40 pm)	Fremantle	1.1 (7)	5.8 (38)	Lost by 31 points	Victoria Park [H]	1,257	5th	
5	Friday, 5 February (5:10 pm)	Brisbane	5.5 (35)	1.5 (11)	Lost by 24 points	Maroochydore Multi Sports Complex [A]	1,667	6th	
6	Sunday, 13 February (12:10 pm)	West Coast	3.4 (22)	7.4 (46)	Won by 24 points	Mineral Resources Park [A]	1,295	6th	
7	Sunday, 20 February (3:10 pm)	North Melbourne	6.2 (38)	2.3 (15)	Lost by 23 points	North Hobart Oval [A]	869	6th	
8	Sunday, 27 February (3:10 pm)	Western Bulldogs	10.6 (66)	6.5 (41)	Won by 25 points	Victoria Park [H]	2,796	6th	
9	Sunday, 6 March (3:10 pm)	Adelaide	4.6 (30)	4.4 (28)	Lost by 2 points	Norwood Oval [A]	2,572	6th	
10	Saturday, 12 March (3:10 pm)	Richmond	6.11 (47)	1.3 (9)	Won by 38 points	Victoria Park [H]	2,221	6th	

==== Finals series ====
Collingwood's 2022 AFL Women's finals series fixtures
Round	Date and time	Opponent	Home	Away	Result	Venue	Attendance	Ref
Round	Date and time	Opponent	Scores^{[a]}			Venue	Attendance	Ref
Qualifying final	Sunday, 27 March (12:05 pm)	Brisbane	10.10 (70)	3.2 (20)	Lost by 50 points	The Gabba [A]	2,675	
Collingwood was eliminated from the 2022 AFLW finals series

==== Ladder ====
Pos	Team	Pld	W	L	D	PF	PA	PP	Pts	Qualification
1	Adelaide (P)	10	9	1	0	405	187	216.6	36	Finals series
2	Melbourne	10	9	1	0	470	252	186.5	36	Finals series
3	Brisbane	10	8	2	0	496	252	196.8	32	Finals series
4	North Melbourne	10	7	3	0	346	249	139.0	28	Finals series
5	Fremantle	10	7	3	0	383	284	134.9	28	Finals series
6	Collingwood	10	6	4	0	340	276	123.2	24	Finals series
7	Western Bulldogs	10	4	5	1	354	372	95.2	18	
8	Carlton	10	4	6	0	304	362	84.0	16	
9	Greater Western Sydney	10	4	6	0	303	409	74.1	16	
10	Gold Coast	10	3	6	1	294	431	68.2	14	
11	Richmond	10	3	7	0	344	423	81.3	12	
12	Geelong	10	2	8	0	242	301	80.4	8	
13	St Kilda	10	2	8	0	213	401	53.1	8	
14	West Coast	10	1	9	0	222	517	42.9	4	

Source: Womens.AFL
Rules for classification: 1) points; 2) percentage; 3) number of points for.
(P) Premiers

==== Squad ====
Players are listed by guernsey number, and 2022 (S6) statistics are for AFL Women's regular season and finals series matches during the 2022 AFL Women's season 6 only. Career statistics include a player's complete AFL Women's career, which, as a result, means that a player's debut and part or whole of their career statistics may be for another club. Statistics are correct as of the Qualifying Round of the 2022 (S6) season (27 March 2022) and are taken from Australian Football.

No.	Name	AFLW debut	Games (2022S6)	Goals (2022S6)	Games (CFC)	Goals (CFC)	Games (AFLW career)	Goals (AFLW career)
1	Sabrina Frederick	2017 (Brisbane)	9	4	9	4	47	24
2	Chloe Molloy	2018	10	8	35	31	35	31
3	Brianna Davey (c)	2017 (Carlton)	1	0	18	6	35	9
4	Imogen Barnett	2022 (S6)	3	0	3	0	3	0
5	Amelia Velardo	2021	9	2	11	2	11	2
6	Jordyn Allen	2019	10	1	30	3	30	3
7	Sarah Rowe	2019	11	1	32	9	32	9
8	Brittany Bonnici	2017	8	2	47	3	47	3
9	Alana Porter	2020	10	0	28	0	28	0
10	Ashleigh Brazill	2018	0	0	16	1	16	1
11	Imogen Purcell	****	0	0	0	0	0	0
12	Stacey Livingstone	2017	11	0	45	0	45	0
13	Jaimee Lambert	2017 (Western Bulldogs)	11	4	43	15	49	20
14	Aishling Sheridan	2020	10	4	28	14	28	14
15	Erica Fowler	2019	9	0	28	0	28	0
16	Aliesha Newman	2017 (Melbourne)	7	2	14	5	39	16
17	Steph Chiocci (c)	2017	7	1	44	6	44	6
18	Ruby Schleicher	2017	11	1	40	3	40	3
19	Bella Smith	2021	4	0	10	0	10	0
20	Eliza James	2022 (S6)	10	5	10	5	10	5
21	Jordan Membrey	2017 (Brisbane)	0	0	13	10	18	11
22	Sophie Casey	2017	10	0	42	2	42	2
23	Lauren Butler	2019	11	0	28	0	28	0
24	Sophie Alexander	2019	11	6	31	16	31	16
25	Mikala Cann	2019	11	3	33	6	33	6
26	Tarni Brown	2021	8	1	19	5	19	5
28	Olivia Meagher	****	0	0	0	0	0	0
30	Alison Downie	2017 (Carlton)	11	1	11	1	50	10
32	El Chaston	2022 (S6)	7	2	7	2	7	2
35	Joanna Lin	2021	0	0	9	3	9	3
40	Abbi Moloney	2021	4	2	6	4	6	4
50	Ebony O'Dea	2020	7	1	21	1	21	1

==== Squad changes ====
In

No.	Name	Position	Previous club	via
1	(Western Australia) Sabrina Frederick	Forward	Richmond	trade
30	(Victoria (state)) Alison Downie	Ruck	Carlton	free agency
20	(Victoria (state)) Eliza James	Forward / Midfielder	Oakleigh Chargers	AFLW National Draft, second round (pick no. 29)
32	(Victoria (state)) Eloise Chaston	Forward	Eastern Ranges	AFLW National Draft, second round (pick no. 32)
4	(Victoria (state)) Imogen Barnett	Forward	Collingwood Reserves	AFLW National Draft, second round (pick no. 33)
28	(Victoria (state)) Olivia Meagher	Midfielder	Collingwood Reserves	Replacement signing (for Joanna Lin)

Out

No.	Name	Position	New Club	via
1	(Victoria (state)) Sharni Norder	Defender		retired
41	(Victoria (state)) Kristy Stratton	Midfielder		delisted
35	(Australian Capital Territory) Maddie Shevlin	Midfielder	Richmond	trade
4	(Tasmania) Abbey Green	Ruck		retired

==== League awards ====
- 2022 (S6) 22under22 selection – Jordyn Allen, Lauren Butler
- 2022 AFL Women's season 6 All-Australian team – Jaimee Lambert, Ruby Schleicher

==== Club awards ====
- Best and fairest – Jaimee Lambert
- Best first year player – Eliza James
- Players' player award – Lauren Butler
- Leading goalkicker – Chloe Molloy (8 goals)

=== 2022 AFL Women's season 7 (August to November) ===
==== Pre-season matches ====
Collingwood's 2022 AFLW pre-season fixture
Date and time	Opponent	Home	Away	Result	Venue	Ref
Date and time	Opponent	Scores^{[a]}			Venue	Ref
Wednesday, 3 August	North Melbourne	2.6 (18)	4.5 (29)	Lost by 11 points	AIA Centre [H]	
Saturday, 13 August (1:00 pm)	Sydney	4.2 (26)	8.8 (56)	Won by 30 points	Blacktown International Sportspark [A]	

==== Regular season ====
Collingwood's 2022 AFL Women's season 7 fixture
Round	Date and time	Opponent	Home	Away	Result	Venue	Attendance	Ladder position	Ref
Round	Date and time	Opponent	Scores^{[a]}			Venue	Attendance	Ladder position	Ref
1	Thursday, 25 August (7:10 pm)	Carlton	3.0 (18)	5.6 (36)	Won by 18 points	Ikon Park [A]	4,128	4th	
2	Sunday, 4 September (1:10 pm)	Sydney	6.9 (45)	2.2 (14)	Won by 31 points	Victoria Park [H]	1,976	4th	
3	Saturday, 10 September (TBC)	Geelong	1.5 (11)	2.3 (15)	Won by 4 points	GMHBA Stadium [A]	1,957	2nd	
4	Sunday, 18 September (12:10 pm)	Adelaide	2.4 (16)	2.9 (21)	Lost by 5 points	Victoria Park [H]	876	3rd	
5	Friday, 23 September (3:10 pm)	Essendon	4.4 (28)	2.5 (17)	Won by 11 points	AIA Centre [H]	3,412	3rd	
6	Saturday, 1 October (4:10 pm)	St Kilda	5.4 (34)	4.12 (36)	Won by 2 points	RSEA Park [A]	2,578	4th	
7	Sunday, 9 October (5:10 pm)	Greater Western Sydney	6.10 (46)	2.2 (14)	Won by 32 points	Victoria Park [H]	1,663	4th	
8	Sunday, 16 October (2:10 pm)	Fremantle	0.3 (3)	4.8 (32)	Won by 29 points	Fremantle Oval [A]	2,117	3rd	
9	Saturday, 22 October (1:10 pm)	North Melbourne	4.1 (25)	9.3 (57)	Lost by 32 points	Victoria Park [H]	1,504	5th	
10	Friday, 28 October (8:10 pm)	Brisbane	8.7 (55)	1.4 (10)	Lost by 45 points	Metricon Stadium [A]	1,180	6th	

==== Finals series ====
Collingwood's 2022 AFL Women's season 7 finals series fixtures
Round	Date and time	Opponent	Home	Away	Result	Venue	Attendance	Ref
Round	Date and time	Opponent	Scores^{[a]}			Venue	Attendance	Ref
Elimination final	Sunday, 6 November (3:10 pm)	Western Bulldogs	5.10 (40)	5.5 (35)	Won by 5 points	Victoria Park [H]	4,823	
Semi-final	Saturday, 12 November (3:10 pm)	Adelaide	3.5 (23)	1.5 (11)	Lost by 12 points	Unley Oval [A]	2,476	
Collingwood was eliminated from the 2022 AFL Women's season 7 finals series

==== Ladder ====
Pos	Team	Pld	W	L	D	PF	PA	PP	Pts	Qualification
1	Brisbane	10	9	1	0	545	193	282.4	36	Finals series
2	Melbourne (P)	10	9	1	0	519	184	282.1	36	Finals series
3	Adelaide	10	8	2	0	412	232	177.6	32	Finals series
4	Richmond	10	7	2	1	321	217	147.9	30	Finals series
5	Geelong	10	7	3	0	384	222	173.0	28	Finals series
6	Collingwood	10	7	3	0	289	244	118.4	28	Finals series
7	Western Bulldogs	10	7	3	0	326	297	109.8	28	Finals series
8	North Melbourne	10	6	3	1	382	229	166.8	26	Finals series
9	Gold Coast	10	5	5	0	309	351	88.0	20	
10	Essendon	10	4	6	0	349	354	98.6	16	
11	Greater Western Sydney	10	4	6	0	265	420	63.1	16	
12	Fremantle	10	3	6	1	267	400	66.8	14	
13	St Kilda	10	3	7	0	307	373	82.3	12	
14	Carlton	10	2	6	2	253	342	74.0	12	
15	Hawthorn	10	3	7	0	245	429	57.1	12	
16	West Coast	10	2	8	0	239	449	53.2	8	
17	Port Adelaide	10	1	8	1	255	361	70.6	6	
18	Sydney	10	0	10	0	207	577	35.9	0	

Source: afl.com.au
Rules for classification: 1) points; 2) percentage; 3) number of points for
(P) Premiers

==== Squad ====
Players are listed by guernsey number, and 2022 (S7) statistics are for AFL Women's regular season and finals series matches during the 2022 AFL Women's season 7 only. Career statistics include a player's complete AFL Women's career, which, as a result, means that a player's debut and part or whole of their career statistics may be for another club. Statistics are correct as of the Semi-final of the 2022 AFL Women's season 7 (12 November 2022) and are taken from Australian Football.

No.	Name	AFLW debut	Games (2022S7)	Goals (2022S7)	Games (CFC)	Goals (CFC)	Games (AFLW career)	Goals (AFLW career)
1	Sabrina Frederick	2017 (Brisbane)	12	2	21	6	59	26
2	Chloe Molloy	2018	12	6	47	37	47	37
3	Brianna Davey (c)	2017 (Carlton)	0	0	18	6	35	9
4	Imogen Barnett	2022 (S6)	8	0	11	0	11	0
5	Imogen Evans	2022 (S7)	5	1	5	1	5	1
6	Jordyn Allen	2019	12	2	42	5	42	5
7	Sarah Rowe	2019	11	2	43	11	43	11
8	Brittany Bonnici	2017	0	0	47	3	47	3
9	Alana Porter	2020	9	1	37	1	37	1
10	Ashleigh Brazill	2018	8	2	24	3	24	3
11	Charlotte Taylor	2022 (S7)	3	0	3	0	3	0
12	Stacey Livingstone	2017	12	0	57	0	57	0
13	Jaimee Lambert	2017 (Western Bulldogs)	12	2	55	17	61	22
14	Aishling Sheridan	2020	9	0	37	14	37	14
15	Erica Fowler	2019	2	0	30	0	30	0
16	Sarah Sansonetti	2020 (Richmond)	10	0	10	0	27	0
17	Steph Chiocci (c)	2017	11	2	55	8	55	8
18	Ruby Schleicher	2017	11	0	51	3	51	3
19	Olivia Barber	2021 (Geelong)	4	2	4	2	14	5
20	Eliza James	2022 (S6)	11	10	21	15	21	15
21	Jordan Membrey	2017 (Brisbane)	10	3	23	13	28	14
22	Sophie Casey	2017	11	0	53	2	53	2
23	Lauren Butler	2019	12	1	40	1	40	1
24	Lauren Brazzale	2017 (Carlton)	11	0	11	0	52	7
25	Mikala Cann	2019	11	2	44	8	44	8
26	Tarni Brown	2021	10	3	29	8	29	8
28	Charlotte Blair	****	0	0	0	0	0	0
30	Alison Downie	2017 (Carlton)	9	0	20	1	59	10
32	El Chaston	2022 (S6)	4	1	11	3	11	3
33	Emily Smith	2022 (S7)	1	0	1	0	1	0
35	Joanna Lin	2021	8	1	17	4	17	4
40	Abbi Moloney	2021	3	1	9	5	9	5

==== Squad changes ====
In

No.	Name	Position	Previous club	via
24	(Victoria (state)) Lauren Brazzale	Midfielder	Carlton	trade
19	(Victoria (state)) Olivia Barber	Forward	Geelong	trade
33	(Victoria (state)) Emily Smith	Forward		rookie signing
16	(Victoria (state)) Sarah Sansonetti	Defender	Richmond	delisted free agent
11	(Victoria (state)) Charlotte Taylor	Midfielder	Oakleigh Chargers	AFLW National Draft, 1st round (pick no. 30)
28	(Victoria (state)) Charlotte Blair	Forward	Dandenong Stingrays	AFLW National Draft, 3rd round (pick no. 56)
5	(Queensland) Imogen Evans	Midfielder	Gold Coast	free agent

Out

No.	Name	Position	New Club	via
24	(Victoria (state)) Sophie Alexander	Forward	Essendon	expansion club signing
11	(Victoria (state)) Imogen Purcell	Defender		delisted
19	(South Australia) Bella Smith	Defender	Sydney	expansion club signing
50	(South Australia) Ebony O'Dea	Defender / Midfielder	Port Adelaide	expansion club signing
16	(Victoria (state)) Aliesha Newman	Forward	Sydney	expansion club signing
5	(Victoria (state)) Amelia Velardo	Ruck	Carlton	trade
28	(Victoria (state)) Olivia Meagher	Midfielder		delisted

==== League awards ====
- 2022 (S7) 22under22 selection – Jordyn Allen

==== Club awards ====
- Best and fairest – Jordyn Allen
- Best first year player – Emily Smith
- Players' player award – Lauren Butler
- Leading goalkicker – Eliza James (10 goals)

== VFLW season ==
=== Regular season ===
Collingwood's 2022 VFL Women's season fixture
Round	Date and local time	Opponent	Home	Away	Result	Venue	Ladder position	Ref
Round	Date and local time	Opponent	Scores^{[a]}			Venue	Ladder position	Ref
1	Sunday, 13 February (10:00 am)	Southern Saints	1.3 (9)	4.5 (29)	Lost by 20 points	Victoria Park [H]	9th	
2	Saturday, 19 February (12:05 pm)	North Melbourne	5.0 (30)	6.6 (42)	Won by 12 points	Arden Street Oval [A]	7th	
3	Sunday, 27 February (9:45 am)	Williamstown	6.2 (38)	2.6 (18)	Won by 20 points	Victoria Park [H]	6th	
4	Saturday, 5 March (12:05 pm)	Hawthorn	4.2 (26)	5.4 (34)	Lost by 8 points	Victoria Park [H]	6th	
5	Saturday, 12 March (9:45 am)	Port Melbourne	5.12 (42)	3.3 (21)	Won by 21 points	Victoria Park [H]	6th	
6	Saturday, 26 March (11:00 am)	Carlton	5.5 (35)	4.8 (32)	Lost by 3 points	Ikon Park [A]	6th	
7	Saturday, 2 April (10:00 am)	Casey	3.11 (29)	5.6 (36)	Lost by 7 points	AIA Centre [H]	7th	
8	Saturday, 9 April (11:05 am)	Geelong Cats	8.9 (57)	3.4 (22)	Lost by 35 points	GMHBA Stadium [A]	7th	
9	Saturday, 23 April (1:30 pm)	Essendon	14.10 (94)	3.3 (21)	Lost by 73 points	The Hangar [A]	7th	
10	Saturday, 30 April (11:00 am)	Darebin	3.3 (21)	8.7 (55)	Won by 34 points	Preston City Oval [A]	7th	
11	Sunday, 8 May (10:00 am)	Casey	3.3 (21)	4.7 (31)	Won by 10 points	Casey Fields [A]	6th	
12	Saturday, 14 May (10:00 am)	Western Bulldogs	5.6 (36)	4.2 (26)	Won by 10 points	AIA Centre [H]	6th	
13	Saturday, 21 May (3:35 pm)	Port Melbourne	5.2 (32)	6.5 (41)	Won by 9 points	ETU Stadium [A]	6th	
14	Saturday, 28 May (2:00 pm)	Geelong Cats	4.2 (26)	6.9 (45)	Lost by 19 points	AIA Centre [H]	6th	

=== Finals series ===
Collingwood's 2022 VFL Women's finals series fixtures
Round	Date and time	Opponent	Home	Away	Result	Venue	Ref
Round	Date and time	Opponent	Scores^{[a]}			Venue	Ref
Elimination final	Sunday, 12 June (11:35 am)	Casey	7.3 (45)	1.4 (10)	Lost by 35 points	Casey Fields [A]	
Collingwood was eliminated from the 2022 VFLW finals series

=== Ladder ===
Pos	Team	Pld	W	L	D	PF	PA	PP	Pts	Qualification
4	Geelong Cats	14	10	4	0	581	366	158.7	40	Finals series
5	Southern Saints	14	9	4	1	537	424	126.7	38	Finals series
6	Collingwood	14	7	7	0	450	499	90.2	28	Finals series
7	North Melbourne	14	6	8	0	412	557	74.0	24	
8	Darebin	14	5	9	0	307	568	54.0	20	

Source: AFL.com.au
Rules for classification: 1) points; 2) percentage; 3) number of points for.

== Notes ==
Key

- H Home match.
- A Away match.

Notes

- **^{a}** Collingwood's scores are indicated in **bold** font.
- **^{b}** Match was played over 6 quarters with an extended squad, including VFL players.
