= 2024 Collingwood Football Club season =

Australian Football League team season

Collingwood Football Club
2024 season
- President: Jeff Browne
- Coach: See below
- Captain: See below
- Home ground: See below
- Regular season: See below
- Finals series: See below

The 2024 Collingwood Football Club season was the club's 128th season of senior competition in the Australian Football League (AFL). The club also fielded its reserves team in the Victorian Football League and women's teams in the AFL Women's and VFL Women's competitions.

== Overview ==
Collingwood's 2024 season overview
Team	Captain(s)	Coach	Home ground	W–L–D	Ladder	Finals	Best and fairest	Leading goalkicker	Refs
AFL	Darcy Moore	Craig McRae	Melbourne Cricket Ground	12–9–2	9th	DNQ	Nick Daicos	Bobby Hill (30)	
AFLW	Brianna Davey	Sam Wright	Victoria Park	1–10–0	18th	DNQ	Ruby Schleicher	Imogen Barnett / Brittany Bonnici / Lauren Butler (4)	
VFL	Campbell Lane & Sam Glover	Josh Fraser	Victoria Park & AIA Centre	4–14–0	20th	DNQ	Sam Glover	Ash Johnson (21)	
VFLW	Meg Ryan	Tom Cashin	Victoria Park	6–8–0	7th	DNQ	Katie Day	Katie Day (6)	

== Squad ==
Players are listed by guernsey number, and 2024 statistics are for AFL regular season and finals series matches during the 2024 AFL season only. Career statistics include a player's complete AFL career, which, as a result, means that a player's debut and part or whole of their career statistics may be for another club. Statistics are correct as of Round 24 of the 2024 season (23 August 2024) and are taken from AFL Tables.

No.	Name	AFL debut	Games (2024)	Goals (2024)	Games (CFC)	Goals (CFC)	Games (AFL career)	Goals (AFL career)
1	Patrick Lipinski	2017 (Western Bulldogs)	23	18	62	32	118	62
2	Jordan De Goey	2015	13	10	171	201	171	201
3	Isaac Quaynor	2019	23	2	108	5	108	5
4	Brayden Maynard	2015	23	3	209	20	209	20
5	Jamie Elliott	2012	15	21	194	287	194	287
6	Tom Mitchell	2013 (Sydney)	6	1	32	8	203	84
7	Josh Daicos	2017	23	7	126	64	126	64
8	Lachie Schultz	2019 (Fremantle)	20	24	20	24	110	125
9	John Noble	2019	20	1	112	8	112	8
10	Scott Pendlebury	2006	20	7	403	201	403	201
11	Daniel McStay	2014 (Brisbane Lions)	5	8	19	28	180	166
12	Josh Carmichael	2022	0	0	8	4	8	4
13	Harry DeMattia	****	0	0	0	0	0	0
14	Darcy Cameron	2018 (Sydney)	23	11	94	62	95	62
15	Nathan Kreuger	2021 (Geelong)	6	7	13	11	15	11
16	Ed Allan	2024	2	1	2	1	2	1
17	Billy Frampton	2018 (Port Adelaide)	18	1	34	8	58	20
18	Finlay Macrae	2021	9	4	21	5	21	5
19	Tew Jiath	2024	1	0	1	0	1	0
20	Iliro Smit	****	0	0	0	0	0	0
21	Oscar Steene	****	0	0	0	0	0	0
22	Steele Sidebottom	2009	22	4	331	194	331	194
23	Bobby Hill	2019 (Greater Western Sydney)	23	30	47	63	88	97
24	Jakob Ryan	2023	0	0	1	0	1	0
25	Jack Crisp	2012 (Brisbane Lions)	23	14	231	77	249	87
26	Reef McInnes	2022	9	13	20	19	20	19
27	Jack Bytel	2020 (St Kilda)	7	1	7	1	29	4
29	Joe Richards	2024	9	6	9	6	9	6
30	Darcy Moore (c)	2015	23	0	173	67	173	67
31	Beau McCreery	2021	17	10	77	52	77	52
32	Will Hoskin-Elliott	2012 (Greater Western Sydney)	20	17	172	144	224	186
33	Lachie Sullivan	2024	10	2	10	2	10	2
34	Josh Eyre	****	0	0	0	0	0	0
35	Nick Daicos	2022	23	20	70	46	70	46
36	Harvey Harrison	2023	12	11	16	14	16	14
37	Oleg Markov	2016 (Richmond)	12	1	35	2	86	7
38	Jeremy Howe	2011 (Melbourne)	19	5	152	23	252	103
39	Aiden Begg	2022	0	0	3	0	3	0
40	Ash Johnson	2022	3	0	27	36	27	36
41	Brody Mihocek	2018	11	19	137	231	137	231
43	Charlie Dean	2024	8	0	8	0	8	0
44	Ned Long	2024	7	2	7	2	12	3
45	Wil Parker	2024	5	1	5	1	5	1
46	Mason Cox	2016	16	6	129	123	129	123

=== Squad changes ===
==== In ====
No.	Name	Position	Previous club	via
8	(New South Wales) Lachie Schultz	Forward	Fremantle	trade
13	(Victoria (state)) Harry DeMattia	Midfielder	Dandenong Stingrays	AFL national draft, first round (pick No. 25)
19	(Victoria (state)) Tew Jiath	Defender	Gippsland Power	AFL national draft, first round (pick No. 37)
27	(Victoria (state)) Jack Bytel	Midfielder	St Kilda	Pre-season supplemental selection period
33	(Victoria (state)) Lachie Sullivan	Midfielder	Footscray	Pre-season supplemental selection period
34	(Victoria (state)) Josh Eyre	Defender	Collingwood Reserves	Pre-season supplemental selection period
45	(Victoria (state)) Wil Parker	Defender	Victoria cricket team	Category B rookie selection
20	(Victoria (state)) Iliro Smit	Ruck	Eastern Ranges	AFL Mid-season rookie draft, first round (pick No. 10)
44	(Victoria (state)) Ned Long	Midfielder	Collingwood Reserves	AFL Mid-season rookie draft, second round (pick No. 19)

==== Out ====
No.	Name	Position	New Club	via
21	(Western Australia) Trey Ruscoe	Defender		delisted
8	(Victoria (state)) Trent Bianco	Midfielder		delisted
12	(Victoria (state)) Tom Wilson	Forward		delisted
19	(South Australia) Arlo Draper	Midfielder		delisted
27	(South Australia) Cooper Murley	Midfielder		delisted
13	(Victoria (state)) Taylor Adams	Midfielder	Sydney	trade
33	(Victoria (state)) Jack Ginnivan	Forward	Hawthorn	trade
20	(Victoria (state)) Will Kelly	Defender		delisted
	(Senegal) Bassirou Faye	Ruck		end of scholarship
28	(Victoria (state)) Nathan Murphy	Defender		retired
12	(South Australia) Josh Carmichael	Midfielder		retired

== AFL season ==
=== Pre-season matches ===
Collingwood's 2024 practice match and AAMI Community Series fixtures
Date and local time	Opponent	Scores^{[a]}			Venue	Ref
Date and local time	Opponent	Home	Away	Result	Venue	Ref
Wednesday, 21 February (10:00 am)	North Melbourne	10.8 (68)	15.12 (102)	Lost by 34 points	AIA Vitality Centre [H]	
Tuesday, 27 February (6:40 pm)	Richmond	5.16 (46)	10.16 (76)	Won by 30 points	Ikon Park [A]	

=== Regular season ===
Collingwood's 2024 AFL season fixture
Round	Date and local time	Opponent	Home	Away	Result	Venue	Attendance	Ladder position	Ref.
Round	Date and local time	Opponent	Scores^{[a]}			Venue	Attendance	Ladder position	Ref.
Opening Round	Saturday, 9 March (7:30 pm)	Greater Western Sydney	18.6 (114)	11.16 (82)	Lost by 32 points	Giants Stadium [A]	21,235	7th	
1	Friday, 15 March (7:40 pm)	Sydney	10.9 (69)	15.12 (102)	Lost by 33 points	MCG [H]	78,933	15th	
2	Thursday, 21 March (7:30 pm)	St Kilda	14.10 (94)	12.7 (79)	Lost by 15 points	MCG [A]	69,517	15th	
3	Thursday, 28 March (6:30 pm)	Brisbane Lions	10.12 (72)	14.8 (92)	Won by 20 points	The Gabba [A]	34,022	12th	
4	Sunday, 7 April (4:40 pm)	Hawthorn	11.11 (77)	11.6 (72)	Won by 5 points	Adelaide Oval [N]	43,198	11th	
5	Bye							13th	Bye
6	Saturday, 20 April (1:45 pm)	Port Adelaide	17.21 (123)	12.9 (81)	Won by 42 points	MCG [H]	65,834	10th	
7	Thursday, 25 April (3:20 pm)	Essendon	12.13 (85)	12.13 (85)	Draw	MCG [A]	93,644	10th	
8	Friday, 3 May (7:40 pm)	Carlton	12.7 (79)	12.13 (85)	Won by 6 points	MCG [A]	88,362	9th	
9	Sunday, 12 May (1:00 pm)	West Coast	15.13 (103)	5.7 (37)	Won by 66 points	Marvel Stadium [H]	37,433	8th	
10	Saturday, 18 May (1:45 pm)	Adelaide	12.6 (78)	11.8 (74)	Won by 4 points	MCG [H]	63,935	5th	
11	Friday, 24 May (6:10 pm)	Fremantle	11.9 (75)	10.15 (75)	Draw	Optus Stadium [A]	54,035	7th	
12	Friday, 31 May (7:40 pm)	Western Bulldogs	12.10 (82)	15.10 (100)	Lost by 18 points	Marvel Stadium [H]	43,298	9th	
13	Monday, 10 June (3:20 pm)	Melbourne	14.5 (89)	6.15 (51)	Won by 38 points	MCG [H]	84,659	6th	
14	Sunday, 16 June (1:00 pm)	North Melbourne	19.4 (118)	18.11 (119)	Won by 1 point	Marvel Stadium [A]	38,311	3rd	
15	Bye							4th	Bye
16	Saturday, 29 June (4:35 pm)	Gold Coast	14.17 (101)	13.12 (90)	Lost by 11 points	People First Stadium [A]	23,029	6th	
17	Friday, 5 July (7:40 pm)	Essendon	12.8 (80)	13.14 (92)	Lost by 12 points	MCG [H]	81,711	9th	
18	Friday, 12 July (7:40 pm)	Geelong	10.11 (71)	13.13 (91)	Lost by 20 points	MCG [H]	73,435	12th	
19	Saturday, 20 July (4:35 pm)	Hawthorn	20.13 (133)	9.13 (67)	Lost by 66 points	MCG [A]	74,171	13th	
20	Sunday, 28 July (1:10 pm)	Richmond	14.9 (93)	9.13 (67)	Won by 26 points	MCG [H]	58,342	12th	
21	Saturday, 3 August (7:30 pm)	Carlton	12.12 (84)	11.15 (81)	Won by 3 points	MCG [H]	86,879	11th	
22	Friday, 9 August (7:40 pm)	Sydney	13.11 (89)	12.14 (86)	Lost by 3 points	SCG [A]	37,854	11th	
23	Saturday, 17 August (4:35 pm)	Brisbane Lions	11.13 (79)	11.12 (78)	Won by 1 point	MCG [H]	61,218	10th	
24	Friday, 23 August (7:40 pm)	Melbourne	8.9 (57)	15.13 (103)	Won by 46 points	MCG [A]	53,957	9th	

=== Ladder ===
Pos	Team	Pld	W	L	D	PF	PA	PP	Pts	Qualification
1	Sydney	23	17	6	0	2242	1769	126.7	68	Finals series
2	Port Adelaide	23	16	7	0	2011	1752	114.8	64	Finals series
3	Geelong	23	15	8	0	2164	1928	112.2	60	Finals series
4	Greater Western Sydney	23	15	8	0	2034	1864	109.1	60	Finals series
5	Brisbane Lions (P)	23	14	8	1	2130	1747	121.9	58	Finals series
6	Western Bulldogs	23	14	9	0	2171	1736	125.1	56	Finals series
7	Hawthorn	23	14	9	0	2090	1763	118.5	56	Finals series
8	Carlton	23	13	10	0	2151	1952	110.2	52	Finals series
9	Collingwood	23	12	9	2	1991	1943	102.5	52	
10	Fremantle	23	12	10	1	1964	1755	111.9	50	
11	Essendon	23	11	11	1	1892	2024	93.5	46	
12	St Kilda	23	11	12	0	1748	1758	99.4	44	
13	Gold Coast	23	11	12	0	1925	1943	99.1	44	
14	Melbourne	23	11	12	0	1785	1812	98.5	44	
15	Adelaide	23	8	14	1	1906	1923	99.1	34	
16	West Coast	23	5	18	0	1594	2339	68.1	20	
17	North Melbourne	23	3	20	0	1619	2550	63.5	12	
18	Richmond	23	2	21	0	1505	2364	63.7	8	

Source: afl.com.au
Rules for classification: 1) points; 2) percentage; 3) number of points for
(P) Premiers

=== Awards & Milestones ===
==== AFL Awards ====
- Neale Daniher Trophy – Jack Crisp (Round 13)
- 2024 22under22 selection (captain) – Nick Daicos
- 2024 All-Australian team – Nick Daicos
- AFL Coaches Association Champion Player of the Year – Nick Daicos
- 2024 Mark of the Year – Bobby Hill (Round 14)

==== AFL Award Nominations ====
- Round 7 – 2024 Mark of the Year nomination – Jamie Elliott
- Round 11 – 2024 AFL Rising Star nomination – Harvey Harrison
- Round 13 – 2024 Mark of the Year nomination – Steele Sidebottom
- Round 16 – 2024 Goal of the Year nomination – Nick Daicos
- Round 23 – 2024 Goal of the Year nomination – Nick Daicos
- 2024 All-Australian team 44-man squad – Darcy Cameron, Nick Daicos

==== Club awards ====
- E.W. Copeland Trophy – Nick Daicos
- R.T. Rush Trophy – Darcy Cameron
- J.J. Joyce Trophy – Josh Daicos
- J.F. McHale Trophy – Jack Crisp
- Jack Regan Trophy – Steele Sidebottom
- Joseph Wren Memorial Trophy – Sam Glover
- Darren Millane Memorial Trophy – Steele Sidebottom
- Harry Collier Trophy – Joe Richards
- Gordon Coventry Trophy – Bobby Hill
- Gavin Brown Award – Lachie Schultz

==== Milestones ====
- Opening Round – Lachie Schultz (Collingwood debut)
- Opening Round – Charlie Dean (AFL debut)
- Round 3 – Tom Mitchell (200 AFL games)
- Round 4 – Patrick Lipinski (100 AFL games)
- Round 6 – Patrick Lipinski (50 AFL goals)
- Round 7 – Scott Pendlebury (10,000 career disposals)
- Round 8 – Lachie Sullivan (AFL debut)
- Round 9 – Joe Richards (AFL debut)
- Round 9 – Jack Bytel (Collingwood debut)
- Round 10 – John Noble (100 games)
- Round 11 – Ed Allan (AFL debut)
- Round 11 – Wil Parker (AFL debut)
- Round 11 – Lachie Schultz (100 AFL games)
- Round 12 – Billy Frampton (50 AFL games)
- Round 14 – Brayden Maynard (200 games)
- Round 14 – Tew Jiath (AFL debut)
- Round 14 – Jeremy Howe (100 AFL goals)
- Round 16 – Isaac Quaynor (100 games)
- Round 17 – Ned Long (Collingwood debut)
- Round 17 – Scott Pendlebury (200 goals)
- Round 21 – Scott Pendlebury (400 games)
- Round 21 – Jordan De Goey (200 goals)

== VFL season ==
=== Pre-season matches ===
Collingwood's 2024 VFL practice matches
Date and local time	Opponent	Scores^{[a]}			Venue	Ref
Date and local time	Opponent	Home	Away	Result	Venue	Ref
Tuesday, 27 February (3:00 pm)	Richmond	89	96	Won by 7 points	Swinburne Centre [A]	
Friday, 15 March (4:00 pm)	Port Melbourne	51	71	Lost by 20 points	Victoria Park [H]	

=== Regular season ===
Collingwood's 2024 VFL season fixture
Round	Date and local time	Opponent	Home	Away	Result	Venue	Ladder position	Ref
Round	Date and local time	Opponent	Scores^{[a]}			Venue	Ladder position	Ref
1	Friday, 22 March (4:05 pm)	Sandringham	7.13 (55)	12.11 (83)	Won by 28 points	RSEA Park [A]	7th	
2	Friday, 29 March (12:05 pm)	Brisbane	16.9 (105)	16.7 (103)	Lost by 2 points	Brighton Homes Arena [A]	10th	
3	Sunday, 14 April (2:05 pm)	Carlton	12.10 (82)	12.11 (83)	Won by 1 point	Ikon Park [A]	7th	
4	Sunday, 21 April (1:05 pm)	Coburg	12.15 (87)	10.12 (72)	Lost by 15 points	Piranha Park [A]	10th	
5	Saturday, 27 April (2:05 pm)	Essendon	11.19 (85)	13.19 (97)	Lost by 12 points	Victoria Park [H]	13th	
6	Saturday, 4 May (12:05 pm)	Southport	14.17 (101)	11.8 (74)	Lost by 27 points	Fankhauser Reserve [A]	15th	
7	Saturday, 11 May (2:05 pm)	Northern Bullants	7.13 (55)	6.12 (48)	Lost by 7 points	Preston City Oval [A]	15th	
8	Saturday, 18 May (11:05 am)	Werribee	6.12 (48)	15.10 (100)	Lost by 52 points	Victoria Park [H]	17th	
9	Bye						16th	Bye
10	Friday, 31 May (4:05 pm)	Footscray	8.11 (59)	14.13 (97)	Lost by 38 points	Marvel Stadium [H]	16th	
11	Sunday, 9 June (2:05 pm)	Casey	18.14 (122)	11.4 (70)	Lost by 52 points	Casey Fields [A]	19th	
12	Sunday, 16 June (11:05 am)	North Melbourne	12.7 (79)	18.12 (120)	Lost by 41 points	AIA Centre [H]	19th	
13	Bye						19th	Bye
14	Saturday, 29 June (1:05 pm)	Essendon	14.14 (98)	9.9 (63)	Lost by 35 points	Windy Hill [A]	19th	
15	Sunday, 7 July (1:05 pm)	Frankston	13.16 (94)	11.9 (75)	Lost by 19 points	Kinetic Stadium [A]	20th	
16	Saturday, 13 July (1:05 pm)	Geelong	11.8 (74)	15.13 (103)	Lost by 29 points	AIA Centre [H]	20th	
17	Sunday, 21 July (11:05 am)	Carlton	7.8 (50)	20.13 (133)	Lost by 83 points	Ikon Park [H]	20th	
18	Sunday, 28 July (10:05 am)	Richmond	9.10 (64)	7.11 (53)	Won by 11 points	Victoria Park [H]	20th	
19	Bye						20th	Bye
20	Friday, 9 August (3:05 pm)	Sydney	11.8 (74)	6.9 (45)	Lost by 29 points	Tramway Oval [A]	20th	
21	Saturday, 17 August (12:05 pm)	Brisbane	11.11 (77)	10.9 (69)	Won by 8 points	AIA Centre [H]	20th	

=== Ladder ===
Pos	Team	Pld	W	L	D	PF	PA	PP	Pts
17	Casey (R)	18	5	13	0	1358	1621	83.8	20
18	Coburg	18	5	13	0	1216	1548	78.6	20
19	Carlton (R)	18	4	14	0	1492	1657	90.0	16
20	Collingwood (R)	18	4	14	0	1252	1645	76.1	16
21	Northern Bullants	18	2	16	0	1026	1635	62.8	8

Source: afl.com.au
Rules for classification: 1) points; 2) percentage; 3) number of points for
(R) Reserves

== AFLW season ==
=== Pre-season matches ===
Collingwood's 2024 AFLW pre-season fixture
Date and time	Opponent	Home	Away	Result	Venue	Ref
Date and time	Opponent	Scores^{[a]}			Venue	Ref
Saturday, 10 August (2:30 pm)	Geelong	3.6 (24)	4.5 (29)	Lost by 5 points	AIA Centre [H]	
Saturday, 17 August (10:00 am)	Fremantle	6.9 (45)	2.3 (15)	Lost by 30 points	Fremantle Oval [A]	

=== Regular season ===
Collingwood's 2024 AFL Women's season fixture
Week	Date and time	Opponent	Home	Away	Result	Venue	Attendance	Ladder position	Ref
Week	Date and time	Opponent	Scores^{[a]}			Venue	Attendance	Ladder position	Ref
1	Friday, 30 August (7:15 pm)	Sydney	8.2 (50)	4.11 (35)	Lost by 15 points	North Sydney Oval [A]	5,489	13th	
2	Saturday, 7 September (1:05 pm)	Hawthorn	3.8 (26)	11.7 (73)	Lost by 47 points	Victoria Park [H]	3,283	17th	
3	Friday, 13 September (5:05 pm)	Brisbane	10.12 (72)	3.2 (20)	Lost by 52 points	Brighton Homes Arena [A]	2,168	17th	
4	Tuesday, 17 September (7:15 pm)	West Coast	3.1 (19)	5.6 (36)	Lost by 17 points	Ikon Park [H]	1,325	18th	
4	Sunday, 22 September (3:05 pm)	Western Bulldogs	2.3 (15)	9.3 (57)	Lost by 42 points	Victoria Park [H]	2,430	18th	
5	Friday, 27 September (12:05 pm)	Gold Coast	4.3 (27)	3.6 (24)	Won by 3 points	Swinburne Centre [H]	1,492	17th	
6	Saturday, 5 October (3:05 pm)	Richmond	7.4 (46)	1.4 (10)	Lost by 36 points	Swinburne Centre [A]	1,742	17th	
7	Thursday, 10 October (7:15 pm)	Port Adelaide	4.9 (33)	3.7 (25)	Lost by 8 points	Alberton Oval [A]	2,526	17th	
8	Sunday, 20 October (5:05 pm)	Adelaide	2.1 (13)	8.8 (56)	Lost by 43 points	Victoria Park [H]	1,775	18th	
9	Sunday, 27 October (3:05 pm)	Carlton	4.4 (28)	5.2 (32)	Lost by 4 points	Victoria Park [H]	2,873	18th	
10	Saturday, 2 November (1:05 pm)	Melbourne	11.8 (74)	4.3 (27)	Lost by 47 points	Ikon Park [A]	1,854	18th	

=== Ladder ===
Pos	Team	Pld	W	L	D	PF	PA	PP	Pts	Qualification
1	North Melbourne (P)	11	10	0	1	656	208	315.4	42	Finals series
2	Hawthorn	11	10	1	0	597	309	193.2	40	Finals series
3	Brisbane	11	9	2	0	611	335	182.4	36	Finals series
4	Adelaide	11	8	3	0	494	285	173.3	32	Finals series
5	Fremantle	11	8	3	0	404	297	136.0	32	Finals series
6	Port Adelaide	11	7	4	0	431	364	118.4	28	Finals series
7	Richmond	11	6	4	1	442	337	131.2	26	Finals series
8	Essendon	11	6	4	1	376	359	104.7	26	Finals series
9	Melbourne	11	6	5	0	369	420	87.9	24	
10	Geelong	11	4	6	1	479	437	109.6	18	
11	St Kilda	11	4	7	0	379	396	95.7	16	
12	Western Bulldogs	11	4	7	0	291	461	63.1	16	
13	West Coast	11	4	7	0	320	509	62.9	16	
14	Carlton	11	4	7	0	266	532	50.0	16	
15	Sydney	11	3	8	0	395	538	73.4	12	
16	Greater Western Sydney	11	1	9	1	374	531	70.4	6	
17	Gold Coast	11	1	9	1	311	569	54.7	6	
18	Collingwood	11	1	10	0	245	553	44.3	4	

Source: afl.com.au
Rules for classification: 1) points; 2) percentage; 3) number of points for
(P) Premiers

=== Squad ===
Players are listed by guernsey number, and 2024 statistics are for AFL Women's regular season and finals series matches during the 2024 AFL Women's season only. Career statistics include a player's complete AFL Women's career, which, as a result, means that a player's debut and part or whole of their career statistics may be for another club. Statistics are correct as of week 10 of the 2024 season (2 November 2024) and are taken from Australian Football.

No.	Name	AFLW debut	Games (2024)	Goals (2024)	Games (CFC)	Goals (CFC)	Games (AFLW career)	Goals (AFLW career)
1	Sabrina Frederick	2017 (Brisbane)	11	1	42	11	80	31
2	Eliza James	2022 (S6)	10	3	37	20	37	20
3	Brianna Davey (c)	2017 (Carlton)	5	1	33	12	50	15
4	Imogen Barnett	2022 (S6)	11	4	23	4	23	4
5	Annie Lee	2022 (S6) (Carlton)	1	0	1	0	15	1
6	Jordyn Allen	2019	11	1	63	6	63	6
7	Sarah Rowe	2019	11	1	64	13	64	13
8	Brittany Bonnici	2017	9	4	66	8	66	8
9	Alana Porter	2020	11	3	55	6	55	6
10	Muireann Atkinson	2024	10	0	10	0	10	0
11	Charlotte Taylor	2022 (S7)	4	0	8	0	8	0
12	Stacey Livingstone	2017	11	1	77	1	77	1
13	Grace Campbell	2020 (Richmond)	7	3	17	5	35	7
14	Aishling Sheridan	2020	0	0	47	15	47	15
15	Erica Fowler	2019	7	0	46	2	46	2
16	Sarah Sansonetti	2020 (Richmond)	4	0	22	0	39	0
17	Nell Morris-Dalton	2020 (Western Bulldogs)	0	0	10	8	30	16
18	Ruby Schleicher	2017	11	1	64	4	64	4
19	Georgia Clark	2024	4	1	4	1	4	1
20	Selena Karlson	2019 (Western Bulldogs)	1	0	7	0	10	0
21	Eleri Morris	2023	7	1	17	7	17	7
22	Mikayla Hyde	2021 (Fremantle)	1	0	1	0	30	8
23	Lauren Butler	2019	5	4	49	5	49	5
24	Lauren Brazzale	2017 (Carlton)	11	0	32	0	73	7
25	Mikala Cann	2019	10	2	64	13	64	13
27	Lucille Cronin	2024	11	0	11	0	11	0
28	Charlotte Blair	2023	6	0	7	0	7	0
29	Tarni White	2020 (St Kilda)	8	2	18	4	50	7
30	Carly Remmos	2024	11	0	11	0	11	0
32	Amber Schutte	2024	9	0	9	0	9	0
35	Kalinda Howarth	2020 (Gold Coast)	0	0	0	0	35	20
36	Imogen Evans	2022 (S7)	5	0	11	1	11	1
37	Jordan Ivey	2017 (Carlton)	6	0	6	0	45	2
38	Sarah Ingram	2024	2	0	2	0	2	0

==== Squad changes ====
In

No.	Name	Position	Previous club	via
10	(Republic of Ireland) Muireann Atkinson	Utility	Monaghan	rookie signing
5	(Victoria (state)) Annie Lee	Defender	Carlton	trade
35	(Queensland) Kalinda Howarth	Forward	Gold Coast	trade
22	(Western Australia) Mikayla Hyde	Forward	Fremantle	trade
19	(Tasmania) Georgia Clark	Forward	Tasmania Devils	AFLW National Draft, first round (pick no. 8)
27	(Victoria (state)) Lucille Cronin	Defender	Oakleigh Chargers	AFLW National Draft, first round (pick no. 9)
32	(Victoria (state)) Amber Schutte	Defender	Gippsland Power	AFLW National Draft, second round (pick no. 32)
30	(Victoria (state)) Carly Remmos	Midfielder	Collingwood VFL	injury replacement
36	(Queensland) Imogen Evans	Midfielder	Collingwood VFL	replacement player
37	(Victoria (state)) Jordan Ivey	Forward	Collingwood VFL	injury replacement
38	(Victoria (state)) Sarah Ingram	Midfielder	Collingwood VFL	injury replacement

Out

No.	Name	Position	New Club	via
5	(Queensland) Imogen Evans	Midfielder		delisted
19	(Victoria (state)) Olivia Barber	Forward		delisted
22	(New South Wales) Sophie Casey	Forward		delisted
35	(Victoria (state)) Joanna Lin	Midfielder		delisted
26	(Victoria (state)) Tarni Brown	Midfielder	Carlton	trade
10	(New South Wales) Ashleigh Brazill	Defender	Fremantle	trade
33	(Victoria (state)) Emily Smith	Forward		delisted

=== League awards ===
- 2024 22under22 selection – Lucy Cronin

=== Club awards ===
- Best and fairest – Ruby Schleicher
- Best first year player – Lucy Cronin
- Players' player award – Mikala Cann
- Leading goalkicker – Imogen Barnett, Brittany Bonnici, Lauren Butler (4 goals each)

== VFLW season ==
=== Pre-season matches ===
Collingwood's 2024 VFLW practice matches
Date and local time	Opponent	Scores^{[a]}			Venue	Ref
Date and local time	Opponent	Home	Away	Result	Venue	Ref
Thursday, 22 February (6:30 pm)	Western Bulldogs				Whitten Oval [A]	
Saturday, 2 March (2:00 pm)	North Melbourne				Arden Street Oval [A]	
Saturday, 9 March (11:00 am)	Geelong Cats				Deakin University Waurn Ponds [A]	

=== Regular season ===
Collingwood's 2024 VFL Women's season fixture
Round	Date and local time	Opponent	Home	Away	Result	Venue	Ladder position	Ref
Round	Date and local time	Opponent	Scores^{[a]}			Venue	Ladder position	Ref
1	Friday, 22 March (6:05 pm)	Southern Saints	4.1 (25)	2.5 (17)	Lost by 8 points	RSEA Park [A]	7th	
2	Friday, 29 March (11:35 am)	Port Melbourne	9.7 (61)	3.3 (21)	Lost by 40 points	ETU Stadium [A]	9th	
3	Saturday, 6 April (12:05 pm)	Box Hill	5.7 (37)	0.3 (3)	Lost by 34 points	Fenjiu Stadium [A]	13th	
4	Saturday, 13 April (12:00 pm)	Carlton	4.5 (29)	1.6 (12)	Won by 17 points	Victoria Park [H]	13th	
5	Saturday, 20 April (11:05 am)	Darebin	2.1 (13)	6.5 (41)	Won by 28 points	Genis Steel Oval [A]	8th	
6	Saturday, 27 April (11:00 am)	Essendon	7.5 (47)	10.4 (64)	Lost by 17 points	Victoria Park [H]	11th	
7	Saturday, 4 May (12:00 pm)	Sydney	5.5 (35)	5.7 (37)	Won by 2 points	Tramway Oval [A]	10th	
8	Saturday, 11 May (12:00 pm)	Geelong Cats	0.1 (1)	6.7 (43)	Won by 42 points	Deakin University [A]	8th	
9	Saturday, 18 May (3:00 pm)	Western Bulldogs	2.2 (14)	6.8 (44)	Lost by 30 points	Victoria Park [H]	9th	
10	Saturday, 25 May (11:00 am)	North Melbourne	1.3 (9)	1.8 (14)	Lost by 5 points	Victoria Park [H]	10th	
11	Sunday, 2 June (11:00 am)	Southern Saints	3.8 (26)	4.5 (29)	Lost by 3 points	AIA Centre [H]	10th	
12	Sunday, 9 June (11:05 am)	Casey	0.7 (7)	3.4 (22)	Won by 15 points	Casey Fields [A]	9th	
13	Sunday, 16 June (11:05 am)	Darebin	3.7 (25)	2.4 (16)	Won by 9 points	Genis Steel Oval [H]	7th	
14	Saturday, 22 June (11:00 am)	Williamstown	1.1 (7)	2.5 (17)	Lost by 10 points	Victoria Park [H]	7th	

=== Ladder ===
Pos	Team	Pld	W	L	D	PF	PA	PP	Pts	Qualification
5	Essendon	14	7	6	1	446	482	92.5	30	Finals series
6	Port Melbourne	14	6	7	1	458	403	113.6	26	Finals series
7	Collingwood	14	6	8	0	341	375	90.9	24	
8	Casey	14	5	8	1	457	732	62.4	22	
9	GWS Giants (E)	5	5	0	0	299	72	415.3	20	

Source: AFL.com.au
Rules for classification: 1) points; 2) percentage; 3) number of points for.
(E) Club playing a limited number of exhibition matches, ineligible for progression to finals series

== Notes ==
Key

- H Home match.
- A Away match.
- N Neutral venue.

Notes

- **^{a}** Collingwood's scores are indicated in **bold** font.
