= List of Collingwood Football Club women's players =

This is a list of Collingwood Football Club players who have made one or more appearance in the AFL Women's (AFLW) since its inception in 2017. Collingwood were one of the foundation clubs for the inaugural AFL Women's season.

== Collingwood Football Club women's players ==
Key
Order	Players are listed in order of debut
Debut year	Debuts are for AFLW regular season and finals series matches only
Games	Statistics are for AFLW regular season and finals series matches only and are correct to the end of round 1, 2026
Goals	Statistics are for AFLW regular season and finals series matches only and are correct to the end of round 1, 2026
Years at club	Includes Collingwood only careers and spans from the season the player joined the club to the year in which they left
^{^}	Currently listed players

Debut year	Player	Games	Goals	Years at club
2017	Christina Bernardi	13	11	2017–2018
2017	Brittany Bonnici^	78	8	2017–
2017	Jess Cameron	13	7	2017–2018
2017	Sophie Casey	63	2	2017–2023
2017	Steph Chiocci	55	8	2017–2022 (S7)
2017	Sarah D'Arcy	24	10	2017–2020
2017	Caitlyn Edwards	14	6	2017–2018
2017	Alicia Eva	7	3	2017
2017	Jasmine Garner	14	10	2017–2018
2017	Emma Grant	20	2	2017–2019
2017	Moana Hope	13	15	2017–2018
2017	Meg Hutchins	12	3	2017–2018
2017	Emma King	14	1	2017–2018
2017	Stacey Livingstone	77	1	2017–2024
2017	Cecilia McIntosh	17	1	2017–2019
2017	Tara Morgan	11	0	2017–2018
2017	Amelia Mullane	14	3	2017–2018
2017	Helen Roden	1	0	2017
2017	Ruby Schleicher^	75	8	2017–
2017	Nicola Stevens	7	0	2017
2017	Lauren Tesoriero	11	1	2017–2018
2017	Bree White	11	1	2017–2018
2017	Penny Cula-Reid	2	0	2017
2017	Melissa Kuys	15	2	2017–2019
2017	Georgia Walker	2	0	2017
2017	Lou Wotton	3	0	2017
2017	Kate Sheahan	1	0	2017
2018	Sarah Dargan	14	2	2018–2020
2018	Eliza Hynes	11	0	2018–2020
2018	Jaimee Lambert	55	17	2018–2022 (S7)
2018	Chloe Molloy	47	37	2018–2022 (S7)
2018	Iilish Ross	11	0	2018–2019
2018	Holly Whitford	4	0	2018–2019
2018	Ashleigh Brazill	32	5	2018–2023
2018	Georgie Parker	3	0	2018–2019
2018	Kristy Stratton	11	1	2018–2021
2019	Sophie Alexander	31	16	2019–2022 (S6)
2019	Jordyn Allen^	71	9	2019–
2019	Lauren Butler^	61	5	2019–
2019	Mikala Cann	76	15	2019–2025
2019	Erica Fowler	46	2	2019–2024
2019	Georgia Gourlay	5	0	2019
2019	Sharni Layton	23	6	2019–2021
2019	Sarah Rowe^	76	13	2019–
2019	Katie Lynch	7	1	2019–2020
2019	Nicole Hildebrand	2	0	2019
2019	Maddie Shevlin	13	1	2019–2021
2019	Jordan Membrey	23	13	2019–2022 (S7)
2019	Darcy Guttridge	3	3	2019
2020	Brianna Davey^	33	12	2020–
2020	Alana Porter	62	10	2020–2025
2020	Aishling Sheridan	47	15	2020–2023
2020	Ebony O'Dea	21	1	2020–2022 (S6)
2021	Tarni Brown	34	9	2021–2023
2021	Bella Smith	10	0	2021–2022 (S6)
2021	Amelia Velardo	11	2	2021–2022 (S6)
2021	Joanna Lin	21	4	2021–2023
2021	Abbi Moloney	9	5	2021–2022 (S7)
2021	Aliesha Newman	14	5	2021–2022 (S6)
2022 (S6)	Eloise Chaston	11	3	2022 (S6)–2022 (S7)
2022 (S6)	Sabrina Frederick^	55	14	2022 (S6)–
2022 (S6)	Eliza James^	39	21	2022 (S6)–
2022 (S6)	Imogen Barnett^	35	4	2022 (S6)–
2022 (S7)	Lauren Brazzale	32	0	2022 (S7)–2024
2022 (S7)	Imogen Evans	11	1	2022 (S7)–2024
2022 (S7)	Sarah Sansonetti	22	0	2022 (S7)–2024
2022 (S7)	Olivia Barber	4	2	2022 (S7)
2022 (S7)	Charlotte Taylor	9	0	2022 (S7)–2025
2022 (S7)	Emily Smith	9	4	2022 (S7)–2023
2023	Charlotte Blair	7	0	2023–2024
2023	Grace Campbell	28	9	2023–2025
2023	Selena Karlson	9	0	2023–2025
2023	Eleri Morris	17	7	2023–2024
2023	Nell Morris-Dalton	18	12	2023–2025
2023	Tarni White^	31	5	2023–
2024	Muireann Atkinson	16	0	2024–2025
2024	Lucy Cronin^	24	0	2024–
2024	Annie Lee	8	0	2024–2025
2024	Carly Remmos^	20	1	2024–
2024	Amber Schutte^	21	0	2024–
2024	Jordan Ivey	6	0	2024
2024	Sarah Ingram	2	0	2024
2024	Georgia Clark	9	7	2024–2025
2024	Mikayla Hyde	11	2	2024–2025
2025	Ash Centra^	9	7	2025–
2025	Kellyann Hogan^	4	0	2025–
2025	Kalinda Howarth^	11	7	2025–
2025	Violet Patterson^	12	1	2025–
2025	Airlie Runnalls^	13	2	2025–
2025	Lily-Rose Williamson	11	0	2025
2025	Georgia Knight^	5	1	2025–
2026	Josephine Bamford^	1	0	2026–
2026	Mischa Barwin^	1	0	2026–
2026	Mattea Breed^	1	0	2026–
2026	Charlotte Brewer^	1	0	2026–
2026	Dominique Carbone^	1	0	2026–
2026	Ariana Hetherington^	1	1	2026–
2026	Zara Neuwirth^	1	0	2026–
2026	Jemma Rigoni^	1	0	2026–
2026	Amy Smith^	1	0	2026–
2026	Imogen Trengove^	1	0	2026–

=== Listed players yet to debut ===
Player	Acquired	Recruited from	Listed
Matilda Argus	No. 41, 2025 national draft	Dandenong Stingrays	2026–
Ellie Brady	Rookie signing	Gaelic football	2026–
Olivia Lewis	Rookie signing	Netball	2026–
Maisie Nankivell	Rookie signing	Netball	2026–

=== Players who did not make their AFLW debut ===
Player	Acquired	Recruited from	Listed
Kendra Heil	Free agency	Eastern Devils	2017
Kaila Bentvelzen	No. 67, 2019 draft	Casey	2020
Machaelia Roberts	No, 94, 2019 draft	Northern Territory	2020
Abbey Green	Trade with North Melbourne	North Melbourne	2021
Imogen Purcell	Category B rookie	Rowing	2021–2022 (S6)
Olivia Meagher	Replacement signing	Collingwood (VFLW)	2022 (S6)

== See also ==
- List of Collingwood Football Club players
- List of Collingwood Football Club coaches
