= Craig McRae =

Australian rules footballer and coach (born 1973)

Personal information
- Full name: Craig McRae
- Nickname: Fly
- Born: 22 September 1973 (age 53); South Australia
- Original team: Glenelg (SANFL)
- Draft: No. 22, 1993 Pre-season Draft, Brisbane Bears
- Height: 176 cm (5 ft 9 in)
- Weight: 72 kg (159 lb)

Club information
- Current club: Collingwood (head coach)

Playing career^{1}
Years	Club	Games (Goals)
1995–1996	Brisbane Bears	39 (56)
1997–2004	Brisbane Lions	156 (176)
Total		195 (232)

Representative team honours
Years	Team	Games (Goals)
1999	South Australia	1 (2)

International team honours
1999	Australia	2 (2)

Coaching career^{3}
Years	Club	Games (W–L–D)
2022–	Collingwood	123 (79–40–4)
- ^{1} Playing statistics correct to the end of the 2004 season.^{3} Coaching statistics correct as of the 2026 season.

Career highlights
- Playing: 3× AFL premiership player: 2001, 2002, 2003; Coaching: AFL premiership coach: 2023; All Australian Coach: 2023; AFLCA Coach of the Year: 2022; Assistant Coaching: AFLCA Assistant Coach of the Year: 2019; VFL Coaching: VFL premiership coach: 2019; VFL Coach of the Year: 2019

Craig McRae (born 22 September 1973) is an Australian rules footballer coach and former player who currently serves as the head coach of the Collingwood Football Club in the Australian Football League (AFL).

== Playing career ==
=== Glenelg Football Club ===
McRae played for Glenelg Football Club in the SANFL from 1993 until 1994, for a total of 41 games and 59 goals.

=== Brisbane Bears ===
McRae was drafted by AFL club Brisbane Bears as the 22nd pick in the 1994 draft and had an immediate impact, kicking two goals in his first game in 1995, and played every game of that year. McRae was known for his ability to kick goals from beyond the fifty-metre line, his fierce tackling, and his scouting of the ball spilled from the hands of taller players. He played for the Brisbane Bears from 1995 until 1996 for a total of 39 games and 56 goals.

=== Brisbane Lions ===
At the end of the 1996 season, when Brisbane Bears merged with Fitzroy Lions resulting in the formation of the Brisbane Lions, McRae was one of the players from the Bears to join the Lions. He played for the Brisbane Lions from 1997 until 2004 for a total of 156 games and 176 goals. He was a member of Brisbane Lions' 2001, 2002 and 2003 premiership sides. McRae retired from professional football after the 2004 Grand Final loss to Port Adelaide.

== Coaching career ==
=== Richmond Football Club assistant coach (2007–2009) ===
In 2007, McRae served as assistant coach in the role of Player Development Coach with the Richmond Football Club under senior coach Terry Wallace. Midway through the 2009 AFL season, McRae took up the head coaching position at Richmond's VFL affiliate club Coburg, when their former coach and fellow Richmond AFL assistant Jade Rawlings was appointed caretaker senior coach at Richmond, after Wallace resigned in the middle of the 2009 AFL season after Round 11, 2009.

=== Brisbane Lions assistant coach (2010) ===
In 2010, McRae took up an assistant coaching position in the role of development coach position at the Brisbane Lions, returning to his old playing club under senior coach and former teammate Michael Voss.

=== Collingwood Football Club assistant coach (2011–2016) ===
McRae joined Collingwood as an assistant coach in the role as head of development in 2011 under senior coach Mick Malthouse and then under senior coach Nathan Buckley from 2012. He remained at the club for five seasons.

=== Richmond Football Club assistant coach (2017–2020) ===
He returned to Richmond at the end of the 2016 season, serving as an assistant coach under senior coach Damien Hardwick and head coach of the club's reserves side in the VFL. He took the side to a losing grand final in 2017, before winning a premiership in 2019 and winning the VFL's coach of the year award and the AFL coaches' association's assistant coach of the year award.

=== Hawthorn Football Club assistant coach (2021) ===
In 2021, McRae joined the Hawthorn Football Club as an assistant coach in the role of forward line coach under senior coach Alastair Clarkson.

=== Collingwood Football Club senior coach (2022–present) ===
In September 2021, McRae returned to the Collingwood Football Club, when he was appointed as senior coach ahead of the 2022 AFL season. McRae replaced caretaker senior coach Robert Harvey, who replaced Nathan Buckley after Buckley stepped down in the middle of the 2021 season. In his first season as senior coach, he led Collingwood to success, winning 16 games and finishing the 2022 season in 4th place after finishing 17th the previous season. Out of their wins, 11 were by less than two goals. In the finals series, Collingwood reached the preliminary finals, where they lost to Sydney by one point after trailing by 23 points at the beginning of the last quarter. The following year, McRae coached Coached Collingwood to its 20th minor premiership with 18 wins. On Saturday, 30 September 2023, Collingwood won by 4 points against the Brisbane Lions in the 2023 AFL Grand Final, giving the club its 16th premiership, their first since 2010, their first in September since 1958, and making McRae a premiership coach. The side narrowly missed out on finals in 2024 and reached the preliminary finals in 2025. Afterwards, McRae signed a contract extension, keeping him at the Magpies until at least the end of the 2028 season.

== Statistics ==
=== Playing statistics ===
Legend
G	Goals	K	Kicks	D	Disposals	T	Tackles
B	Behinds	H	Handballs	M	Marks

Season	Team	No.	Games	Totals							Averages (per game)							Votes
Season	Team	No.	Games	G	B	K	H	D	M	T	G	B	K	H	D	M	T	Votes
1995	Brisbane Bears	4	23	28	22	231	113	344	47	38	1.2	1.0	10.0	4.9	15.0	2.0	1.7	1
1996	Brisbane Bears	4	16	28	19	181	49	230	38	18	1.8	1.2	11.3	3.1	14.4	2.4	1.1	1
1997	Brisbane Lions	4	18	19	16	172	70	242	42	27	1.1	0.9	9.6	3.9	13.4	2.3	1.5	2
1998	Brisbane Lions	4	16	13	15	150	79	229	48	17	0.8	0.9	9.4	4.9	14.3	3.0	1.1	0
1999	Brisbane Lions	4	24	41	32	267	73	340	69	37	1.7	1.3	11.1	3.0	14.2	2.9	1.5	3
2000	Brisbane Lions	4	16	9	11	164	69	233	48	28	0.6	0.7	10.3	4.3	14.6	3.0	1.8	2
2001^{#}	Brisbane Lions	4	19	21	20	145	64	209	52	28	1.1	1.1	7.6	3.4	11.0	2.7	1.5	0
2002^{#}	Brisbane Lions	4	24	29	27	193	108	301	61	66	1.2	1.1	8.0	4.5	12.5	2.5	2.8	1
2003^{#}	Brisbane Lions	4	20	26	17	132	79	211	34	62	1.3	0.9	6.6	4.0	10.6	1.7	3.1	0
2004	Brisbane Lions	4	19	18	17	124	58	182	38	41	0.9	0.9	6.5	3.1	9.6	2.0	2.2	1
Career			195	232	196	1759	762	2521	477	362	1.2	1.0	9.0	3.9	12.9	2.4	1.9	11

== Head coaching record ==
Team	Year	Home and Away Season					Finals				
Team	Year	Won	Lost	Drew	Win %	Finish	Won	Lost	Drew	Win %	Result
COLL	2022	16	6	0	.727	4th out of 18	1	2	0	.333	Lost to Sydney in Preliminary Final
COLL	2023	18	5	0	.783	1st out of 18	3	0	0	1.000	Defeated Brisbane in Grand Final
COLL	2024	12	9	2	.565	9th out of 18	-	-	-	-	-
COLL	2025	16	7	0	.697	4th out of 18	1	1	0	.500	Lost to Brisbane in Preliminary Final
COLL	2026	12	9	2	.565	9th out of 18	0	1	0	.000	Lost to Western Bulldogs in Wildcard Final
		74	36	4	.712		5	4	0	.556	

== Honours and achievements ==
=== Playing ===
Team

- 3× AFL premiership player (Brisbane Lions): 2001, 2002, 2003

Individual

- SA state-of-origin representative: 1999
- International Rules representative for Aus v Ireland: 1999

=== Coaching ===
Team

- AFL premiership coach (Collingwood): 2023
- AFL minor premiership (Collingwood): 2023
- VFL premiership coach (Richmond reserves): 2019

Individual

- Jock McHale Medal: 2023
- All-Australian team: 2023
- AFL Senior Coach of the Year: 2022

== Other work ==
Prior to his appointment as Collingwood Football Club senior coach, McRae was a part-time kicking and catching coach with the Melbourne Storm.

Until the end of the 2006 season, McRae was involved in a sports administration business and various football broadcasting roles including radio station Triple M, where he hosted a football programme with former Brisbane teammate Jason Akermanis.

== Personal life ==
McRae has three daughters, including one from his first marriage and his second daughter from a previous partner.

McRae married his second wife, Gabrielle, in 2022. Their daughter Maggie (his third child) was born the morning of the 2023 AFL Grand Final, and McRae announced her birth during the post-game presentation.

McRae played his junior football at Mitchell Park Football Club
