= Isaac Chugg =

AFL Player

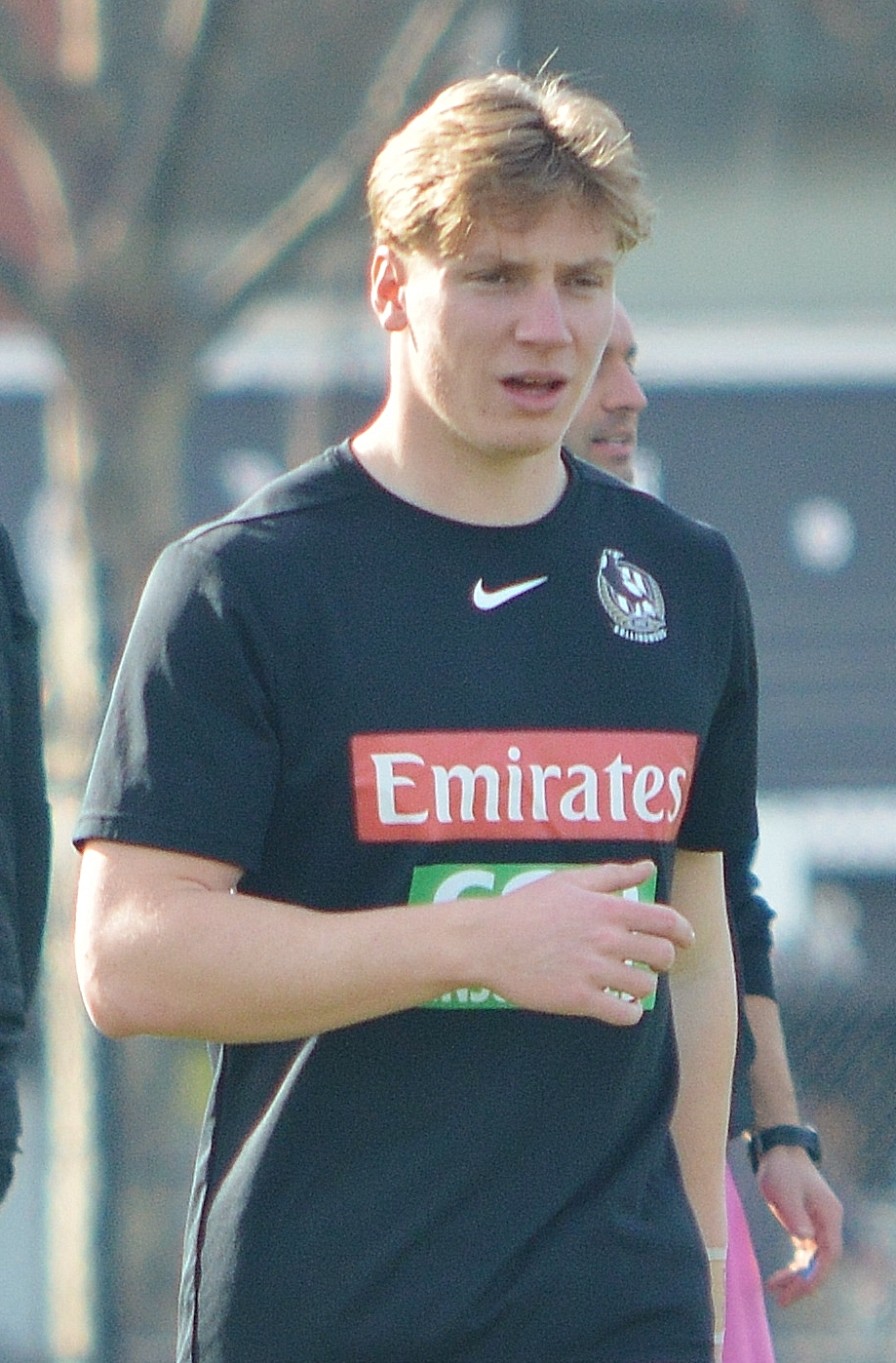
- Chugg with Collingwood's VFL team in July 2021

Personal information
- Full name: Isaac Chugg
- Born: 26 February 2002 (age 24); Launceston, Tasmania, Australia
- Original team: Launceston (TSL)
- Draft: No. 28, 2021 rookie draft
- Debut: 26 June 2022, Collingwood vs. Greater Western Sydney, at MCG
- Height: 180 cm (5 ft 11 in)
- Weight: 84 kg (185 lb)
- Position: Midfielder / forward

Playing career^{1}
Years	Club	Games (Goals)
2021–2022	Collingwood	2 (0)
- ^{1} Playing statistics correct to the end of the 2022 season.

Isaac Chugg (born 26 February 2002) is a former professional Australian rules footballer who played for the Collingwood Football Club in the Australian Football League (AFL).

== AFL career ==
Chugg was drafted to Collingwood in the 2021 rookie draft at pick number 28. Jack Ginnivan was picked at pick 13 and was the only player Collingwood picked before Chugg. Chugg was not picked to play in any games for Collingwood in 2021. In round 15 of 2022, Chugg got picked to play his debut game against the GWS Giants at the MCG. Chugg was able to get 5 disposals, the least of anyone playing in that game. The next round, he was selected as medi-sub against the Gold Coast Suns.He was unused. The next week Isaac Chugg was dropped from the team and didn't play a game for the rest of the year. At the end of the 2022 AFL season Chugg was delisted from Collingwood.

== Statistics ==
Updated to the end of the 2022 season.

Legend
G	Goals	K	Kicks	D	Disposals	T	Tackles
B	Behinds	H	Handballs	M	Marks

Season	Team	No.	Games	Totals							Averages (per game)						
Season	Team	No.	Games	G	B	K	H	D	M	T	G	B	K	H	D	M	T
2021	Collingwood	34	0	0	0	0	0	0	0	0	0	0	0	0	0	0	0
2022	Collingwood	34	2	0	0	2	3	5	1	2	0.0	0.0	1.0	1.5	2.5	0.5	1.0
Career			2	0	0	2	3	5	1	2	0.0	0.0	1.0	1.5	2.5	0.5	1.0
