= Charlie Dean (footballer) =

Australian rules footballer (born 2001)

Personal information
- Nickname: Chaz
- Born: 19 June 2001 (age 25)
- Original team: Williamstown
- Draft: No. 2, 2022 rookie draft
- Debut: 9 March 2024, Collingwood vs. Greater Western Sydney, at Sydney Showground Stadium
- Height: 195 cm (6 ft 5 in)
- Weight: 86 kg (190 lb)

Playing career
Years	Club	Games (Goals)
2022–2025	Collingwood	12 (0)

Career highlights
- Fothergill–Round–Mitchell Medal: 2021

Charlie Dean is a professional Australian rules footballer who last played for the Collingwood Football Club in the Australian Football League (AFL).

== AFL career ==
Dean was drafted by Collingwood with the second pick of the 2022 rookie draft after winning the 2021 Fothergill–Round–Mitchell Medal. Foot injuries kept him out of the senior team for the 2022 and 2023 seasons. He made his debut against Greater Western Sydney in the opening round of the 2024 AFL season.

Dean was delisted at the end of the 2025 AFL season, after 12 games over 4 seasons for the club.

== Statistics ==
Legend
G	Goals	K	Kicks	D	Disposals	T	Tackles
B	Behinds	H	Handballs	M	Marks

Season	Team	No.	Games	Totals							Averages (per game)							Votes
Season	Team	No.	Games	G	B	K	H	D	M	T	G	B	K	H	D	M	T	Votes
2022	Collingwood	43	0	—	—	—	—	—	—	—	—	—	—	—	—	—	—	0
2023	Collingwood	43	0	—	—	—	—	—	—	—	—	—	—	—	—	—	—	0
2024	Collingwood	43	8	0	0	52	32	84	40	8	0.0	0.0	6.5	4.0	10.5	5.0	1.0	0
2025	Collingwood	43	4	0	0	16	26	42	11	3	0.0	0.0	4.0	6.5	10.5	2.8	0.8	0
Career			12	0	0	68	58	126	51	11	0.0	0.0	5.7	4.8	10.5	4.3	0.9	0
