= Aiden Begg =

Australian rules footballer (born 2002)

- Begg with Tasmania in 2026

Personal information
- Full name: Aiden Begg
- Born: 8 October 2002 (age 24)
- Original team: North Ringwood (EFNL)
- Draft: No. 18, 2021 mid-season rookie draft
- Debut: 1 May 2022, Collingwood vs. Gold Coast, at MCG
- Height: 197 cm (6 ft 6 in)
- Weight: 99 kg (218 lb)
- Position: Ruck

Playing career^{1}
Years	Club	Games (Goals)
2021–2024	Collingwood	3 (0)
- ^{1} Playing statistics correct to the end of the 2024 season.

Aiden Begg (born 8 October 2002) is a former professional Australian rules footballer who played for the Collingwood Football Club in the Australian Football League (AFL).

== Junior football ==
Begg played his junior football career at North Ringwood junior football club where he is a 2 time premiership player. He then went on to play for Eastern Ranges in the NAB league.

== AFL career ==
Begg was selected at pick 18 in the 2021 mid-season rookie draft. Begg did not play any games in his first season with Collingwood in 2021 due to overcoming an existing injury. The next year he played his first game against the Gold Coast Suns. He played 3 games in 2022. In August 2024, after playing only three games in four seasons, Collingwood announced they wouldn't offer Begg a new contract.

== Statistics ==
Statistics are correct to the end of the 2024 season

Legend
G	Goals	K	Kicks	D	Disposals	T	Tackles
B	Behinds	H	Handballs	M	Marks

Season	Team	No.	Games	Totals							Averages (per game)						
Season	Team	No.	Games	G	B	K	H	D	M	T	G	B	K	H	D	M	T
2021	Collingwood	39	0	—	—	—	—	—	—	—	—	—	—	—	—	—	—
2022	Collingwood	39	3	0	0	9	21	30	8	7	0.0	0.0	3.0	7.0	10.0	2.7	2.3
2023	Collingwood	39	0	—	—	—	—	—	—	—	—	—	—	—	—	—	—
2024	Collingwood	39	0	—	—	—	—	—	—	—	—	—	—	—	—	—	—
Career			3	0	0	9	21	30	8	7	0.0	0.0	3.0	7.0	10.0	2.7	2.3
