= Olympic Park Oval =

Australian rules venue in Victoria, Australia

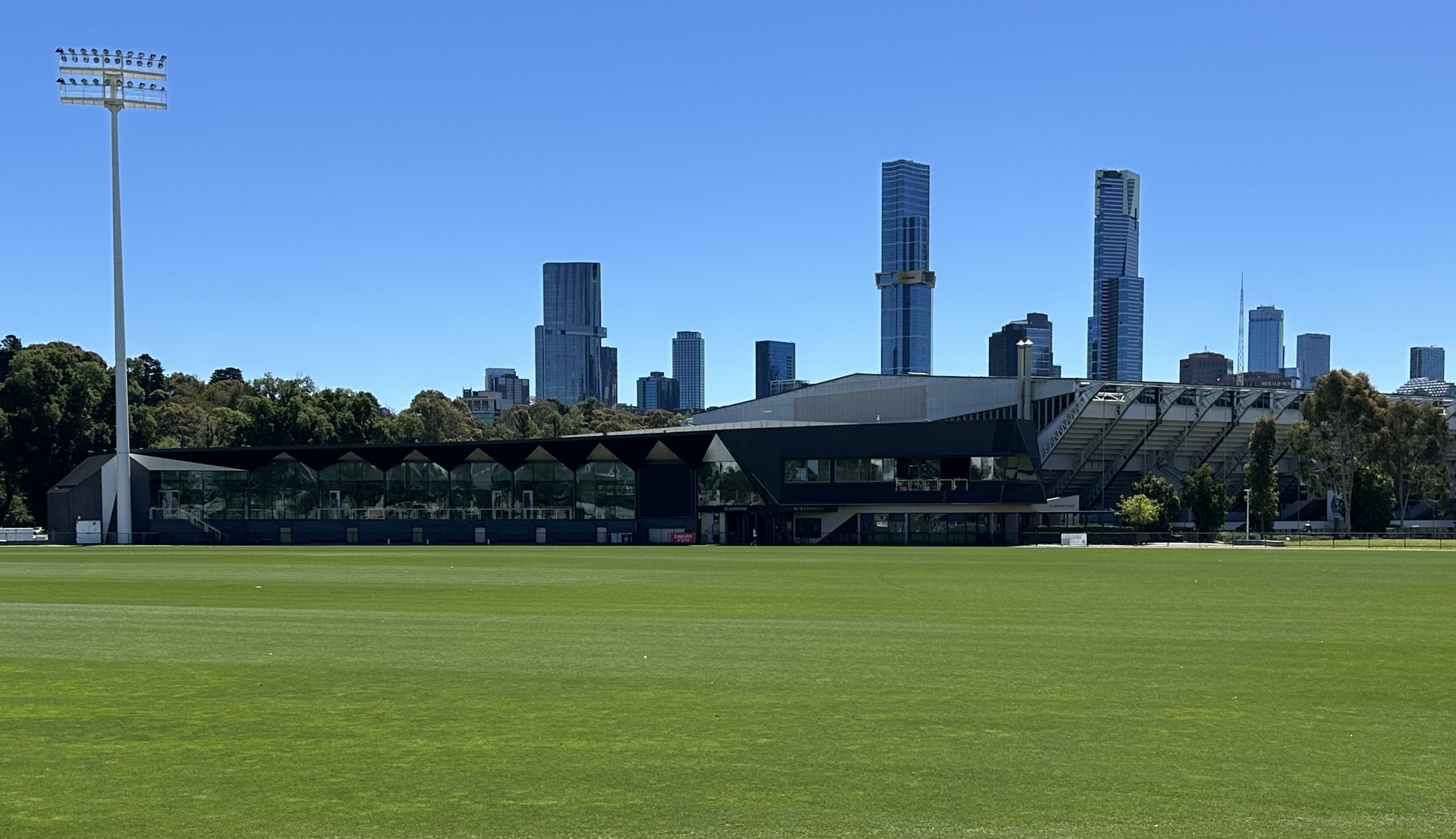
- Interactive map of Olympic Park Oval
- Former names: Westpac Centre (2013–2015); Holden Centre (2015–2022); AIA Centre (2022–2025)
- Location: Olympic Park, Melbourne, Victoria
- Coordinates: 37°49′29″S 144°58′53″E
- Owner: Melbourne & Olympic Parks Trust
- Operator: Melbourne & Olympic Parks Trust
- Capacity: 3,500
- Surface: Grass

Construction
- Opened: 2013
- Cost: $11,300,000 AUD

Tenants
- Collingwood Football Club; Administration & Training (2013–present); VFL (2016–present); AFLW (2017–18)

Olympic Park Oval (known as KGM Centre under naming rights) is an Australian rules football venue located on the site of the former Olympic Park Stadium in Olympic Park, Melbourne. The oval is primarily utilised as the training ground of the Collingwood Football Club and as a venue for some of the club's Victorian Football League (VFL) matches. It is located alongside the club's other tenanted facility, the Melbourne Sports and Entertainment Centre.

== History and usage ==
As part of a larger redevelopment of the Melbourne Sports and Entertainment precinct, the Olympic Park Stadium was torn down in 2012, two years after the adjacent Melbourne Rectangular Stadium was built for Olympic Park's former tenants. Olympic Park Oval was created in stadium's former location. The oval opened for use on 11 April 2013. The federal government and Collingwood Football Club announced in April 2012 the additional construction of indoor community and training facilities on the site. These were opened in October 2015.

Olympic Park Oval plays host to some of Collingwood's reserves matches in the Victorian Football League (VFL). In addition, each of the club's four teams (AFL, AFLW, VFL and VFLW) regularly train on the Oval, while administration of the club is conducted in the associated "Glasshouse" building and the connected Melbourne Sports and Entertainment Centre (AIA Vitality Centre). It was the primary home ground for Collingwood in the AFL Women's competition during the 2017 and 2018 seasons, before the team shifted home matches to Victoria Park in Abbotsford.

The Oval remains public land and is available for casual use, though the Melbourne Olympic Park Trust restricts use for official training and sporting usage.

== Design ==
The oval features a grass playing surface in the standard shape for Australian rules football and Cricket. It boasts a two-lane running track around its exterior. For viewing purposes the oval features limited concrete terracing and four light towers for evening play.

The associated indoor structure (known as The Glasshouse) is a multi-use community and events space. The building includes a gym, cafe, theatre and office space and is internally connected to the older Melbourne Sports and Entertainment Centre.
