= Ash Johnson =

Australian rules footballer (born 1997)

Personal information
- Full name: Ashley Johnson
- Born: 6 October 1997 (age 29); Halls Creek, Western Australia, Australia
- Original team: Sturt (SANFL)
- Draft: No. 3, 2021 mid-season draft
- Debut: 16 July 2022, Collingwood vs. Adelaide, at Adelaide Oval
- Height: 193 cm (6 ft 4 in)
- Weight: 91 kg (201 lb)
- Position: Forward

Playing career
Years	Club	Games (Goals)
2021–2025	Collingwood	27 (36)

Representative team honours
Years	Team	Games (Goals)
2025	Indigenous All-Stars	1 (0)

Ashley Johnson (born 6 October 1997) is a professional Australian rules footballer who last played for the Collingwood Football Club in the Australian Football League (AFL).

== Early life ==
Originally from Halls Creek in the northern Kimberley region of Western Australia, Johnson spent time playing for Claremont at Under-18 level in the West Australian Football League, North Wangaratta in the Ovens & King Football League, Scotch Old Collegians in the Adelaide Footy League, and Sturt in the South Australian National Football League before he was drafted by Collingwood.

He is the brother of Melbourne player Shane McAdam and Fremantle rookie Roy Benning, and the cousin of Gold Coast's Jy Farrar.

== AFL career ==
Ash Johnson was selected for Collingwood at pick 3 in the 2021 mid-season draft. Johnson did not play any games for Collingwood in his first season. In 2022, he played his debut game in Round 18 against the Adelaide Crows in a 5-point victory. Johnson kicked his first two goals of his career in his debut game. Johnson played every game after his debut game in 2022 for Collingwood. Ash Johnson played his first game of 2023 in Round 3.

After being nominated in Round 10, 2023, for Mark of the Year against Carlton, Johnson's form started to lapse. He returned to the side late in the year but did not get selected for any of Collingwood's three finals, as they went on to win the 2023 AFL Grand Final.

In October 2024, Johnson was delisted by Collingwood, with the club committing to select him via the 2025 AFL rookie draft. The following month the club selected him with the 20th pick of the rookie draft.

Despite being re-drafted for the 2025 AFL season, Johnson didn't play a senior match and was again delisted at the end of the season.

== Statistics ==
Legend
G	Goals	K	Kicks	D	Disposals	T	Tackles
B	Behinds	H	Handballs	M	Marks

Season	Team	No.	Games	Totals							Averages (per game)							Votes
Season	Team	No.	Games	G	B	K	H	D	M	T	G	B	K	H	D	M	T	Votes
2021	Collingwood	40	0	—	—	—	—	—	—	—	—	—	—	—	—	—	—	0
2022	Collingwood	40	9	15	9	52	14	66	30	18	1.7	1.0	5.8	1.6	7.3	3.3	2.0	0
2023	Collingwood	40	15	21	10	83	38	121	53	23	1.4	0.7	5.5	2.5	8.1	3.5	1.5	0
2024	Collingwood	40	3	0	1	7	2	9	5	5	0.0	0.3	2.3	0.7	3.0	1.7	1.7	0
2025	Collingwood	40	0	—	—	—	—	—	—	—	—	—	—	—	—	—	—	0
Career			27	36	20	142	54	196	88	46	1.3	0.7	5.3	2.0	7.3	3.3	1.7	0
