= Selena Karlson =

Australian rules footballer (born 1998)

Personal information
- Born: 13 August 1998 (age 28)
- Original team: Southern Saints (VFL Women's)
- Draft: No. 34, 2018 AFLW draft
- Debut: Round 4, 2019, Western Bulldogs vs. Brisbane, at VU Whitten Oval
- Height: 181 cm (5 ft 11 in)
- Position: Defender

Playing career^{1}
Years	Club	Games (Goals)
2019	Western Bulldogs	3 (0)
2020–2021	St Kilda	0 (0)
2023–2025	Collingwood	9 (0)
Total		12 (0)
- ^{1} Playing statistics correct to the end of the 2025 season.

Selena Karlson (born 13 August 1998) is an Australian rules footballer who played for Western Bulldogs, St Kilda, and Collingwood in the AFL Women's (AFLW) competition.

== AFLW career ==
Karlson was drafted by the Western Bulldogs with the 34th pick overall in the 2018 AFLW draft. Karlson made her AFLW debut in round 4 of the 2019 season. She signed to St Kilda in the expansion signing period in April 2019. In March 2021, Karlson retired after several injuries prevented her from making a senior appearance for St Kilda.

In April 2023, Karlson returned to the AFLW and was drafted by Collingwood. She played nine games for the club at AFLW level and was delisted at the end of the 2025 AFL Women's season.

== Statistics ==
Updated to the end of the 2025 season.

Legend
G	Goals	K	Kicks	D	Disposals	T	Tackles
B	Behinds	H	Handballs	M	Marks

Season	Team	No.	Games	Totals							Averages (per game)						
Season	Team	No.	Games	G	B	K	H	D	M	T	G	B	K	H	D	M	T
2019	Western Bulldogs	26	3	0	0	10	5	15	2	5	0.0	0.0	3.3	1.7	5.0	0.7	1.7
2020	St Kilda	26	0	—	—	—	—	—	—	—	—	—	—	—	—	—	—
2021	St Kilda	26	0	—	—	—	—	—	—	—	—	—	—	—	—	—	—
2023	Collingwood	20	6	0	0	30	7	37	9	12	0.0	0.0	5.0	1.2	6.2	1.5	2.0
2024	Collingwood	20	1	0	0	2	0	2	0	1	0.0	0.0	2.0	0.0	2.0	0.0	1.0
2025	Collingwood	20	2	0	0	5	0	5	1	3	0.0	0.0	2.5	0.0	2.5	0.5	1.5
Career			12	0	0	47	12	59	12	21	0.0	0.0	3.9	1.0	4.9	1.0	1.8
