= Josh Carmichael (Australian footballer) =

AFL Player

Personal information
- Full name: Josh Carmichael
- Born: 23 September 1999 (age 27)
- Original team: West Adelaide (SANFL)/Merbein Magpies(Sunraysia)
- Draft: No. 9, 2022 mid-season draft
- Debut: 9 July 2022, Collingwood vs. North Melbourne, at MCG
- Height: 190 cm (6 ft 3 in)
- Weight: 88 kg (194 lb)
- Position: forward

Playing career^{1}
Years	Club	Games (Goals)
2022–2024	Collingwood	8 (4)
- ^{1} Playing statistics correct to the end of the 2023 season.

Josh Carmichael (born 23 September 1999) is a retired professional Australian rules footballer who played for the Collingwood Football Club in the Australian Football League (AFL) from 2022 until 2024, before retiring due to medical conditions during the 2024 season.

== AFL career ==
Carmichael got drafted to the Collingwood Magpies in the 2022 mid-season draft at pick number 9. Carmichael didn't play a game in the AFL until round 17 against the North Melbourne Football Club at the MCG. He got 14 disposals in his debut game. The next round against Adelaide Carmichael kicked his first goal in the AFL. In his third game for Collingwood he was selected as medi-sub and kicked 2 fourth quarter goals to help his team defeat the Essendon Football Club. Josh Carmichael played the next three games but got dropped for Collingwood's 1 point win against Carlton. He got selected as medi-sub in the semi final win against the Fremantle Dockers. He played his first game of 2023 against the Richmond Football Club where he managed to only get 2 disposals.

Before the 2022 preliminary final against Sydney, Carmichael and teammate Beau McCreery got in a car crash on the Monash Freeway going to the Melbourne Airport. They did not get any injuries and McCreery was able to play the final.

In July 2024, Carmichael was medically retired due to ongoing concussion symptoms.

== Statistics ==
Statistics are correct to the end of the 2023 season

Legend
G	Goals	K	Kicks	D	Disposals	T	Tackles
B	Behinds	H	Handballs	M	Marks

Season	Team	No.	Games	Totals							Averages (per game)						
Season	Team	No.	Games	G	B	K	H	D	M	T	G	B	K	H	D	M	T
2022	Collingwood	45	7	4	4	62	21	83	10	13	0.6	0.6	8.9	3.0	11.9	1.4	1.9
2023	Collingwood	45	1	0	0	0	2	2	0	1	0.0	0.0	0.0	2.0	2.0	0.0	1.0
Career			8	4	4	62	23	85	10	14	0.5	0.5	7.8	2.9	10.6	1.3	1.8
