= Harvey Harrison =

Personal information
- Full name: Harvey James Harrison
- Born: 10 November 2003 (age 22); North Adelaide, Australia
- Original teams: North Adelaide, (SANFL)
- Draft: No. 52, 2021 national draft
- Debut: 3 June 2023, Collingwood vs. West Coast, at Optus Stadium
- Height: 181 cm (5 ft 11 in)
- Weight: 83 kg (183 lb)
- Position: Medium Forward

Club information
- Current club: Collingwood
- Number: 36

Playing career^{1}
Years	Club	Games (Goals)
2022–	Collingwood	28 (18)
- ^{1} Playing statistics correct to the end of the 2026 season.

Career highlights
- AFL Rising Star nominee: 2024

Harvey James Harrison (born 10 November 2003) is a professional Australian rules footballer playing for the Collingwood Football Club in the Australian Football League (AFL). Harrison plays as a medium forward.

== AFL career ==
Harvey Harrison was drafted to Collingwood at pick 52 in the 2021 AFL national draft. He is one of two players that have played an AFL game for Collingwood in the 2021 national draft. Harrison didn't play any games in 2022, his first season with Collingwood. Harvey Harrison debuted in Collingwood's win against West Coast in round 12 of the 2023 AFL season. Harrison kicked his first goal in the AFL during the second quarter but earlier in the first quarter he hit the post after the ball bounced the wrong way on the goal line.

== Statistics ==
Updated to the end of round 22, 2026.

Legend
G	Goals	K	Kicks	D	Disposals	T	Tackles
B	Behinds	H	Handballs	M	Marks

Season	Team	No.	Games	Totals							Averages (per game)							Votes
Season	Team	No.	Games	G	B	K	H	D	M	T	G	B	K	H	D	M	T	Votes
2022	Collingwood	36	0	—	—	—	—	—	—	—	—	—	—	—	—	—	—	0
2023	Collingwood	36	4	3	1	13	18	31	9	9	0.8	0.3	3.3	4.5	7.8	2.3	2.3	0
2024	Collingwood	36	12	11	2	48	60	108	19	27	0.9	0.2	4.0	5.0	9.0	1.6	2.3	0
2025	Collingwood	36	0	—	—	—	—	—	—	—	—	—	—	—	—	—	—	0
2026	Collingwood	36	9	3	3	61	34	95	33	26	0.3	0.3	6.8	3.8	10.6	3.7	2.9	0
Career			25	17	6	122	112	234	61	62	0.7	0.2	4.9	4.5	9.4	2.4	2.5	0
