= Alana Porter =

Australian rules footballer (born 2001)

Personal information
- Full name: Alana Porter
- Born: 7 February 2001 (age 25)
- Original team: Oakleigh Chargers (NAB League)
- Draft: No. 82, 2019 national draft
- Debut: Round 1, 2020, Collingwood vs. West Coast, at Victoria Park
- Height: 163 cm (5 ft 4 in)
- Position: Defender

Playing career^{1}
Years	Club	Games (Goals)
2020–2025	Collingwood	62 (10)
- ^{1} Playing statistics correct to the end of the 2025 season.

Alana Porter (born 7 February 2001) is an Australian rules footballer who played for Collingwood in the AFL Women's (AFLW).

== Early life and state football ==
Porter played for Oakleigh Chargers in the Girls' NAB League. She has also been with Collingwood's VFLW squad, playing 7 games for them in the 2019 season. She made history with the VFLW Collingwood squad, helping them win their first premiership. In her junior years she played with St Peters Football Club in the South Metro Junior Football League (SMJFL), where she was in the top three of the best and fairest for two seasons. Later, she transitioned from midfield to defence ahead of her AFLW career.

== AFL Women's career ==
Porter was selected by Collingwood for their AFLW squad with pick 82. On the morning of the draft, she was studying for her VCE exams and was excited to be drafted by Collingwood as she was a fan of the club. She made her debut in round 1, 2020, in a match at Victoria Park against West Coast. After playing in each match of her debut season, Porter became known as a fierce competitor and is regarded to handle leaps to a new level in an unfazed manner. In her debut season, she won the Best First Year Player award, together with Aishling Sheridan. In December 2025, Collingwood announced they didn't offer Porter a further contract for the 2026 AFL Women's season.

== Personal life ==
Porter studied at Bentleigh Secondary College, where she was Sport Captain and competed in the State Athletics helping Bentleigh reach 7th in the state. She is planning to study science and Japanese at the University of Melbourne.

== Statistics ==
Statistics are correct to the end of the 2025 season.

Legend
G	Goals	K	Kicks	D	Disposals	T	Tackles
B	Behinds	H	Handballs	M	Marks

Season	Team	No.	Games	Totals							Averages (per game)						
Season	Team	No.	Games	G	B	K	H	D	M	T	G	B	K	H	D	M	T
2020	Collingwood	9	7	0	0	21	15	36	6	12	0.0	0.0	3.0	2.1	5.1	0.9	1.7
2021	Collingwood	9	11	0	1	31	36	67	12	16	0.0	0.1	2.8	3.3	6.1	1.1	1.5
2022 (S6)	Collingwood	9	10	0	1	35	44	79	13	30	0.0	0.1	3.5	4.4	7.9	1.3	3.0
2022 (S7)	Collingwood	9	9	1	0	30	22	52	10	19	0.1	0.0	3.3	2.4	5.8	1.1	2.1
2023	Collingwood	9	7	2	3	20	14	34	9	29	0.3	0.4	2.9	2.0	4.9	1.3	4.1
2024	Collingwood	9	11	3	3	47	52	99	18	40	0.3	0.3	4.3	4.7	9.0	1.6	3.6
2025	Collingwood	9	7	4	3	14	33	47	2	16	0.6	0.4	2.0	4.7	6.7	0.3	2.3
Career			62	10	11	198	216	414	70	162	0.2	0.2	3.2	3.5	6.7	1.1	2.6
