= Lauren Butler =

Australian rules footballer

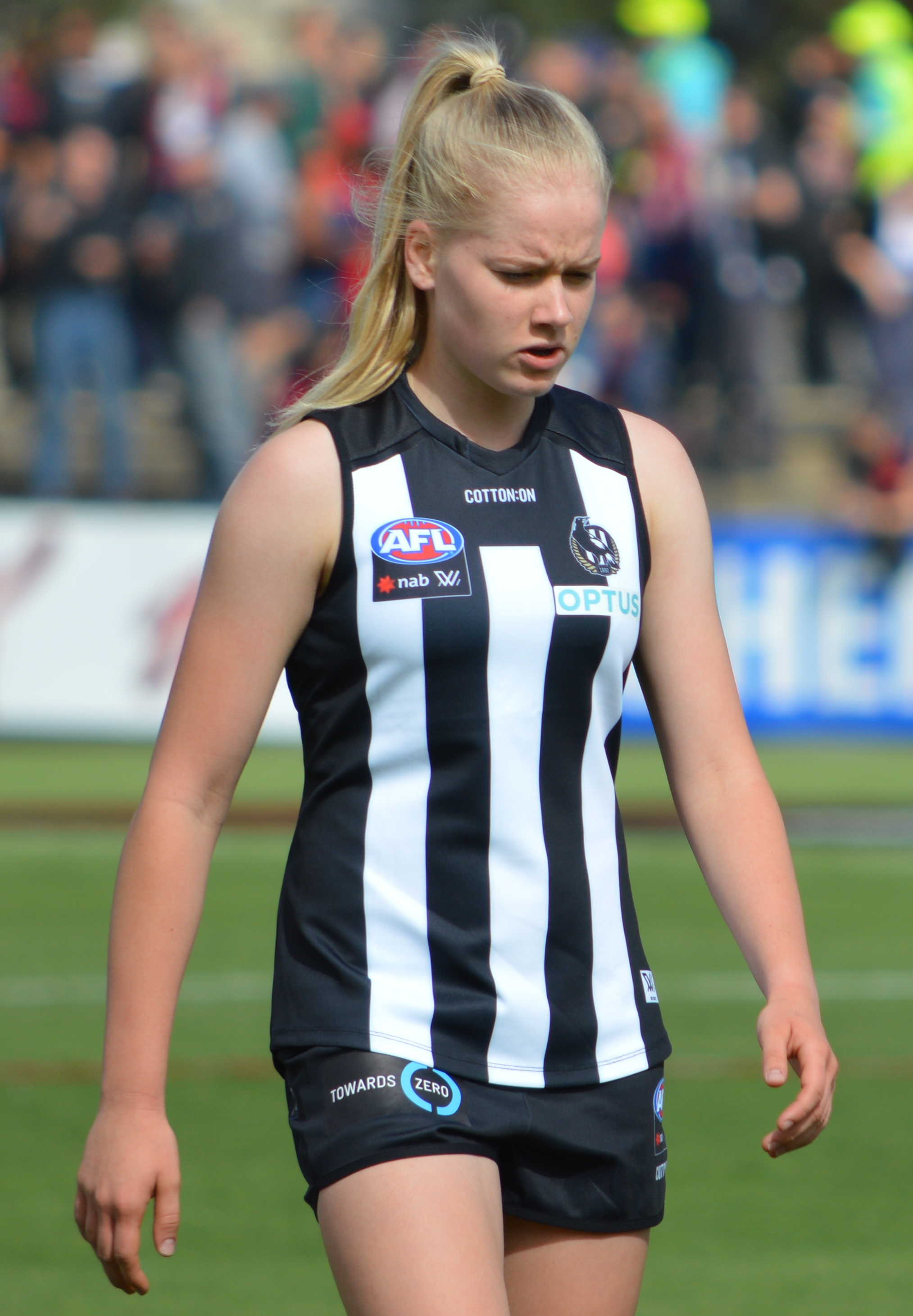
- Butler with Collingwood in February 2019

Personal information
- Born: 20 November 2000 (age 25)
- Original teams: GWV Rebels (TAC Cup Girls); Western Bulldogs (VFLW)
- Draft: No. 18, 2018 AFLW draft
- Debut: Round 1, 2019, Collingwood vs. Geelong, at GMHBA Stadium
- Height: 170 cm (5 ft 7 in)
- Position: Defender

Club information
- Current club: Collingwood
- Number: 23

Playing career^{1}
Years	Club	Games (Goals)
2019–	Collingwood	62 (5)
- ^{1} Playing statistics correct to the end of round 3, 2026.

Lauren Butler (born 20 November 2000) is an Australian rules footballer playing for Collingwood in the AFL Women's (AFLW).

== Early life and junior career ==
Butler is from Maryborough, Victoria and attended Ballarat Grammar School. She played football from the age of eight, representing the Carisbrook Lady Redbacks as a junior. In 2017, Butler captained her school to victory in the interschool Herald Sun Shield competition. She also captained the Greater Western Victoria Rebels for 2018 in the TAC Cup Girls and played two games for the Western Bulldogs in the VFL Women's before breaking her finger. Butler represented Vic Country at the 2018 AFL Women's Under 18 Championships and tested at the AFLW draft combine, placing fourth in the yo-yo test and fifth in the two-kilometre time trial.

== AFLW career ==
Butler was drafted by Collingwood with pick 18 in the 2018 AFLW draft, their fourth selection. She made her debut in the opening round of the 2019 AFLW season versus Geelong. It was revealed Butler had signed on with Collingwood for two years on 10 June 2021.

== Statistics ==
Statistics are correct the end of the 2025 season.

Legend
G	Goals	K	Kicks	D	Disposals	T	Tackles
B	Behinds	H	Handballs	M	Marks

Season	Team	No.	Games	Totals							Averages (per game)						
Season	Team	No.	Games	G	B	K	H	D	M	T	G	B	K	H	D	M	T
2019	Collingwood	23	3	0	0	4	5	9	1	8	0.0	0.0	1.3	1.7	3.0	0.3	2.7
2020	Collingwood	23	7	0	0	42	22	64	17	15	0.0	0.0	6.0	3.1	9.1	2.4	2.1
2021	Collingwood	23	7	0	0	38	32	70	12	19	0.0	0.0	5.4	4.6	10.0	1.7	2.7
2022 (S6)	Collingwood	23	11	0	0	88	55	143	25	34	0.0	0.0	8.0	5.0	13.0	2.3	3.1
2022 (S7)	Collingwood	23	12	1	0	119	46	165	32	40	0.1	0.0	9.9	3.8	13.8	2.7	3.3
2023	Collingwood	23	4	0	0	18	13	31	3	7	0.0	0.0	4.5	3.3	7.8	0.8	1.8
2024	Collingwood	23	5	4	1	16	21	37	6	12	0.8	0.2	3.2	4.2	7.4	1.2	2.4
2025	Collingwood	23	12	0	0	83	41	124	22	24	0.0	0.0	6.9	3.4	10.3	1.8	2.0
Career			61	5	1	408	235	643	118	159	0.1	0.0	6.7	3.9	10.5	1.9	2.6
