= Imogen Barnett =

Personal information
- Born: 11 July 1995 (age 31)
- Original team: Old Trinity (VAFA)
- Draft: No. 33, 2021 AFL Women's draft
- Debut: Round 2, 2022 (S6), Collingwood vs. St Kilda, at Victoria Park
- Height: 176 cm (5 ft 9 in)
- Position: Forward

Club information
- Current club: Collingwood
- Number: 4

Playing career^{1}
Years	Club	Games (Goals)
2022 (S6)–	Collingwood	40 (5)
- ^{1} Playing statistics correct to the end of the 2026 season.

Imogen Barnett (born 11 July 1995) is an Australian rules footballer who plays for the Collingwood Football Club in the AFL Women's (AFLW).

== State career ==
Barnett first played Australian rules football at Old Trinity in the Victorian Amateur Football Association (VAFA). At the club, she played mainly as a ruck and won the William Buck Premier Women's Best and Fairest award in 2019. She also represented the Victorian representative team.

Barnett played for Old Trinity from 2017–2019 and then joined Collingwood's VFL Women's (VFLW) team, where she moved into a key forward role. In the 2021 VFL Women's season, she was the VFLW's leading goalkicker, kicking 20 goals from 13 regular season matches and also won the club's best and fairest award.

== AFLW career ==
Barnett was selected by Collingwood with pick 33 in the 2021 AFL Women's draft. She made her AFLW debut in the 2022 (S6) season against St Kilda.

After suffering a season-ending ankle injury in the 2023 season, Barnett bounced back with an average 8.1 disposals and her first AFLW goal in the 2024. At the end of the season, in December 2024, she signed a two-year contract extension with Collingwood, committing to the club until at least the end of the 2026 season.

In December 2025, following a consistent and career-best season, in which she averaged 11.4 disposals a game, Barnett extended her contract by another year until at least the end of the 2027 season.

== Personal life ==
While playing football, Barnett also works as a pediatric nurse, with both careers being very demanding of her time.

== Statistics ==
Statistics are correct to the end of the 2025 season.

Legend
G	Goals	K	Kicks	D	Disposals	T	Tackles
B	Behinds	H	Handballs	M	Marks	H/O	Hit-outs

Season	Team	No.	Games	Totals								Averages (per game)								Votes
Season	Team	No.	Games	G	B	K	H	D	M	T	H/O	G	B	K	H	D	M	T	H/O	Votes
2022 (S6)	Collingwood	4	3	0	1	8	5	13	3	5	0	0.0	0.3	2.7	1.7	4.3	1.0	1.7	0.0	0
2022 (S7)	Collingwood	4	8	0	2	36	12	48	13	27	77	0.0	0.3	4.5	1.5	6.0	1.6	3.4	9.6	0
2023	Collingwood	4	1	0	1	2	1	3	0	3	13	0.0	1.0	2.0	1.0	3.0	0.0	3.0	13.0	0
2024	Collingwood	4	11	4	6	57	32	89	28	35	107	0.4	0.5	5.2	2.9	8.1	2.5	3.2	9.7	0
2025	Collingwood	4	12	0	3	91	46	137	47	47	123	0.0	0.3	7.6	3.8	11.4	3.9	3.9	10.3	3
Career			35	4	13	194	96	290	91	117	320	0.1	0.4	5.5	2.7	8.3	2.6	3.3	9.1	3
