= Emily Smith (cricketer) =

Australian cricketer

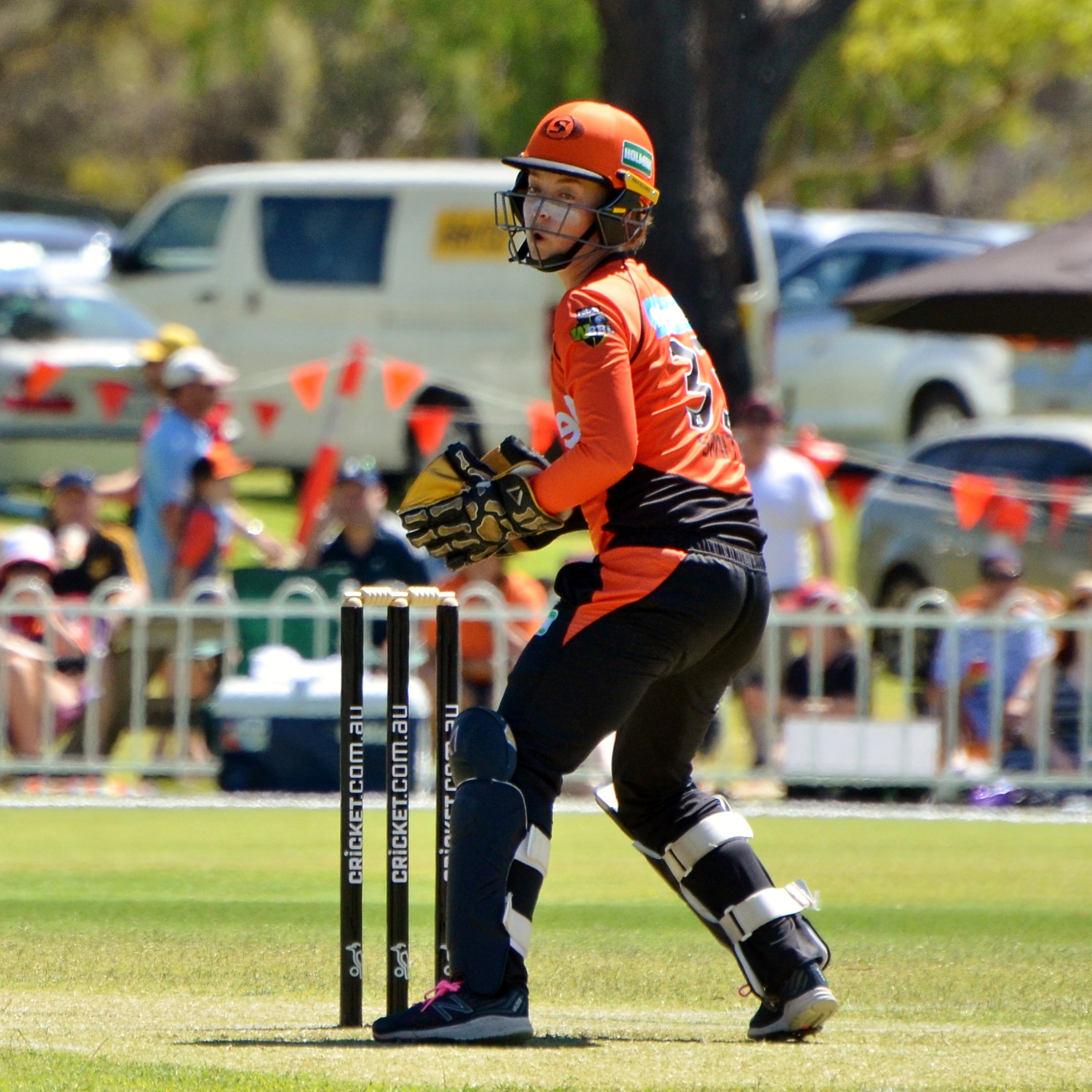
- Smith keeping for Perth Scorchers during WBBL|03

Personal information
- Full name: Emily Jane Smith
- Born: 9 January 1995 (age 31); Sunshine, Victoria, Australia
- Batting: Right-handed
- Role: Wicket-keeper

Domestic team information
- Years: Team
- 2013/14–2015/16: Tasmania
- 2015–2016: Essex
- 2015/16: Hobart Hurricanes
- 2016/17–2018/19: Western Australia
- 2016/17–2018/19: Perth Scorchers
- 2019/20–2021/22: Tasmania
- 2019/20–2020/21: Hobart Hurricanes
- 2021/22: Sydney Thunder

Career statistics
Competition	WLA	WT20
Matches	37	87
Runs scored	230	132
Batting average	12.10	13.20
100s/50s	0/0	0/0
Top score	41	17*
Catches/stumpings	21/8	26/28
- Source: CricketArchive, 21 March 2021

Emily Jane Smith (born 9 January 1995) is an Australian cricketer who plays as a wicket-keeper. She has previously taken the field for Western Fury, Essex Eagles, Perth Scorchers, Hobart Hurricanes, Sydney Thunder and Tasmanian Tigers.

Smith began her cricketing career in Victoria, Australia, after being introduced to the game by one of her friends. Neither of her parents was a cricket fan. After playing as a junior at Sunshine Cricket Club, she joined Victorian Premier Cricket team Essendon Maribyrnong Park, and during the 2012–13 season she was a member of the Victorian Spirit rookie squad.

At the start of the 2013–14 season, Smith was signed by Tasmanian Roar. In 2014–15, she spent the majority of the season travelling south to play for the Roar. In 2015–16, she relocated to Tasmania for the full season, and during the Australian winters of 2015 and 2016, she played for Essex.

Smith kept wicket for the Hobart Hurricanes during its inaugural WBBL|01 season (2015–16). In October 2016, she was recruited by Westmeadows Cricket Club in Melbourne as its girls' cricket program coach, and joined Western Fury and the Perth Scorchers as a replacement for Jenny Wallace, who had retired.

In November 2018, she was named in the Perth Scorchers' squad for the 2018–19 Women's Big Bash League season.

Smith moved to the Hobart Hurricanes and Tasmanian Tigers for the 2019 season. On 18 November 2019 she was suspended from playing cricket for twelve months, with nine of those suspended, for breaching Cricket Australia's anti-corruption policy when she posted a video of her team's batting lineup on Instagram prior to a Hobart Hurricanes game against the Sydney Thunder.

Smith's partner is her Tasmanian Tigers teammate Heather Graham who moved to Tasmania in 2020 to spend more time with her.
