= Eliza James (footballer) =

Australian rules footballer (born 2003)

Personal information
- Full name: Eliza James
- Born: 1 October 2003 (age 23)
- Original team: Oakleigh Chargers (NAB League)
- Draft: No. 29, 2021 national draft
- Debut: Round 1, 2022 (S6), Collingwood vs. Carlton, at Ikon Park
- Height: 168 cm (5 ft 6 in)
- Position: Forward

Club information
- Current club: Collingwood
- Number: 2

Playing career^{1}
Years	Club	Games (Goals)
2022 (S6)–	Collingwood	48 (25)
- ^{1} Playing statistics correct to the end of the 2026 season.

Career highlights
- Collingwood Best First Year Player: 2022 (S6); Collingwood leading goalkicker: 2022 (S7)

Eliza James (born 1 October 2003) is a professional Australian rules footballer playing for the Collingwood Football Club in the AFL Women's (AFLW). She played for Oakleigh Chargers in the NAB League before she was drafted by Collingwood. She is also an ex student of Star of the Sea College in Melbourne.

== Early life and state football ==
James started her football career playing Auskick and played locally with St Peters. As an under-14 she placed second in the South Metro Junior Football League (SMJFL) best and fairest award in 2017. In May 2018, she played her 100th game for the club, kicking two goals during the milestone.

James played three seasons with Oakleigh Chargers in the NAB League and was described as an electric goalkicker. With the club she won the 2021 NAB League premiership. Following her strong performance in the 2021 season, James was selected in the Vic Metro team for the 2021 AFL Women's Under-19 Championships, and played in their victory over Western Australia.

== AFLW career ==
James was drafted to Collingwood with the 29th pick of the 2021 AFL Women's draft, which was Collingwood's first pick. She made her debut in the first round of 2022 AFL Women's season 6 at Ikon Park against Carlton. In the third round, at GMHBA Stadium against Geelong, she kicked her first goal, showcasing her speed and adding another dimension to Collingwood's forward line. At the end of the season she was awarded the Best First Year Player award. During 2022 AFL Women's season 7, James played in the Finals series for the first time with a breakout performance in which she kicked four goals, breaking the record as the first AFLW player to kick four goals in a finals game. Her performance saw her claim the AFLW MVP of the Week award.

== Statistics ==
Statistics are correct to the end of the 2025 season.

Legend
G	Goals	K	Kicks	D	Disposals	T	Tackles
B	Behinds	H	Handballs	M	Marks

Season	Team	No.	Games	Totals							Averages (per game)						
Season	Team	No.	Games	G	B	K	H	D	M	T	G	B	K	H	D	M	T
2022 (S6)	Collingwood	20	10	5	1	50	36	86	11	23	0.5	0.1	5.0	3.6	8.6	1.1	2.3
2022 (S7)	Collingwood	20	11	10	3	66	25	91	20	34	0.9	0.3	6.0	2.3	8.3	1.8	3.1
2023	Collingwood	2	6	2	2	22	12	34	8	15	0.3	0.3	3.7	2.0	5.7	1.3	2.5
2024	Collingwood	2	10	3	2	55	23	78	18	21	0.3	0.2	5.5	2.3	7.8	1.8	2.1
2025	Collingwood	2	2	1	0	6	3	9	4	3	0.5	0.0	3.0	1.5	4.5	2.0	1.5
Career			39	21	8	199	99	298	61	96	0.5	0.2	5.1	2.5	7.6	1.6	2.5
