= Sarah Sansonetti =

Australian rules footballer

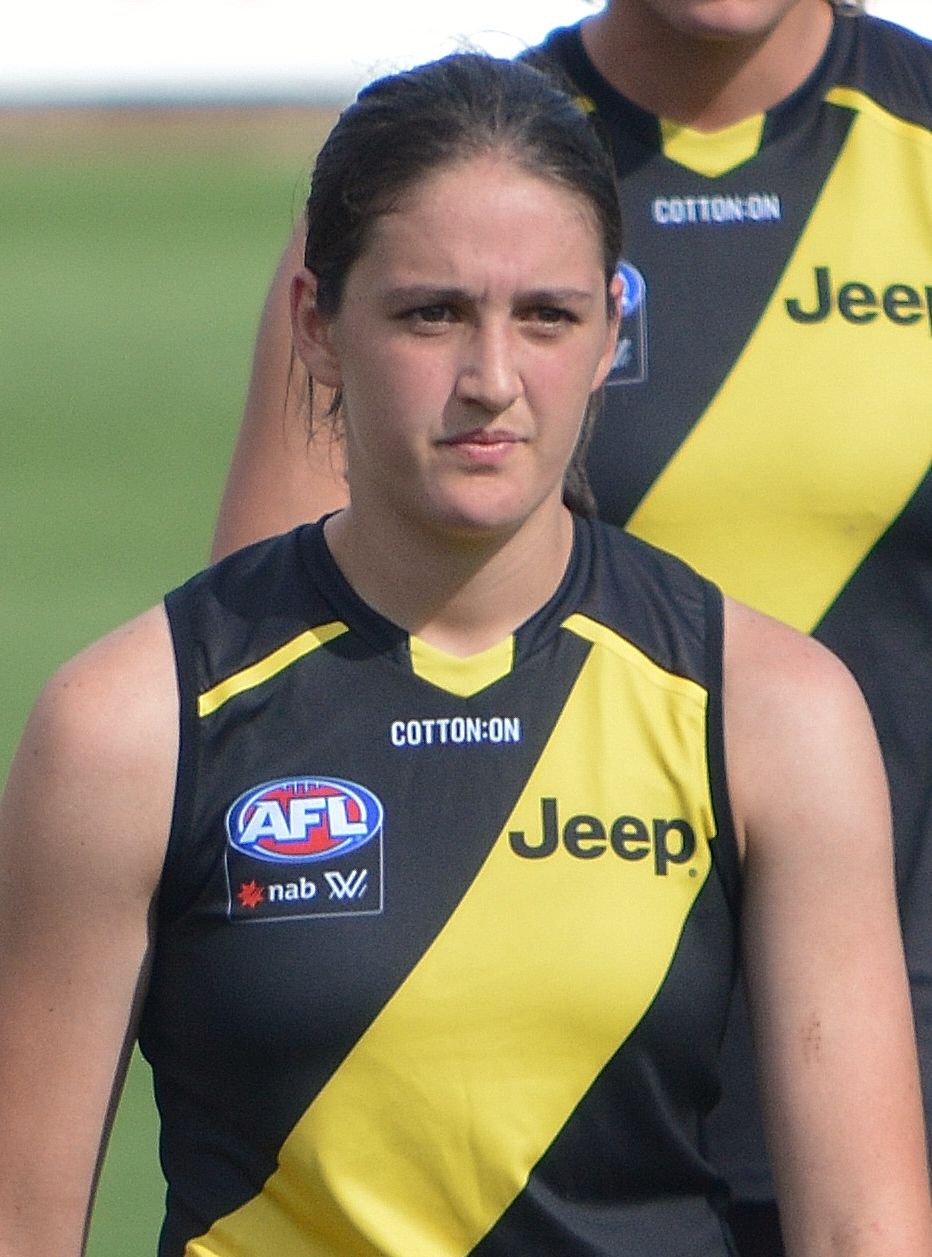
- Sansonetti with Richmond in February 2020

Personal information
- Born: 2 August 2001 (age 25)
- Original team: Northern Knights (NAB League Girls)
- Draft: No. 40, 2019 national draft
- Debut: Round 1, 2020, Richmond vs. Carlton, at Ikon Park
- Height: 172 cm (5 ft 8 in)
- Position: Defender

Playing career^{1}
Years	Club	Games (Goals)
2020–2022 (S6)	Richmond	17 (0)
2022 (S7)–2024	Collingwood	22 (0)
Total		39 (0)
- ^{1} Playing statistics correct to the end of the 2024 season.

Sarah Sansonetti (born 2 August 2001) is an Australian rules footballer who played for Richmond and Collingwood in the AFL Women's (AFLW).

== AFLW career ==
Sansonetti was drafted by Richmond with their fourth selection and fortieth overall in the 2019 AFL Women's draft. She made her debut against Carlton at Ikon Park in the opening round of the 2020 season. In May 2022, she was delisted by Richmond after playing 17 games for the club.

In June 2022, Sansonetti was signed by Collingwood as a delisted free agent. In November 2024, Sansonetti was delisted by Collingwood.

== Statistics ==
Statistics are correct to the end of the 2024 season

Legend
G	Goals	K	Kicks	D	Disposals	T	Tackles
B	Behinds	H	Handballs	M	Marks

Season	Team	No.	Games	Totals							Averages (per game)						
Season	Team	No.	Games	G	B	K	H	D	M	T	G	B	K	H	D	M	T
2020	Richmond	18	6	0	0	11	26	37	2	25	0.0	0.0	1.8	4.3	6.2	0.3	4.2
2021	Richmond	18	3	0	0	7	11	18	2	2	0.0	0.0	2.3	3.7	6.0	0.7	0.7
2022 (S6)	Richmond	18	8	0	0	31	20	51	14	15	0.0	0.0	3.9	2.5	6.4	1.8	1.9
2022 (S7)	Collingwood	16	10	0	1	49	23	72	27	23	0.0	0.1	4.9	2.3	7.2	2.7	2.3
2023	Collingwood	16	8	0	0	53	27	80	22	19	0.0	0.0	6.6	3.4	10.0	2.8	2.4
2024	Collingwood	16	4	0	0	11	7	18	3	15	0.0	0.0	2.8	1.8	4.5	0.8	3.8
Career			39	0	1	162	114	276	70	99	0.0	0.03	4.2	2.9	7.1	1.8	2.5
