= Joanna Lin =

Australian rules footballer

Personal information
- Born: 20 February 2002 (age 24)
- Original team: Oakleigh Chargers (NAB League Girls)
- Draft: No. 26, 2020 AFL Women's draft
- Debut: Round 2, 2021, Collingwood vs. Geelong, at Victoria Park
- Height: 162 cm (5 ft 4 in)

Playing career^{1}
Years	Club	Games (Goals)
2021–2023	Collingwood	21 (4)
- ^{1} Playing statistics correct to the end of the 2023 season.

Joanna Lin (born 20 February 2002) is an Australian rules footballer who played for the Collingwood Football Club's AFL Women's (AFLW) team.

== AFLW career ==
Lin played her first AFLW match on 6 February 2021 against Geelong, coming on as an interchange player. Lin kicked her first AFLW goal on 14 February 2021 in a match against Richmond.

Lin's family migrated from Taiwan to Australia. She was Collingwood's number 26 draft pick in the 2020 AFL Women's draft, selected from the Oakleigh Chargers.

In December 2023, Collingwood announced they won't be offering Lin a contract for the 2024 AFL Women's season.

== Statistics ==
Statistics are correct to the end of the 2023 season.

Legend
G	Goals	K	Kicks	D	Disposals	T	Tackles
B	Behinds	H	Handballs	M	Marks

Season	Team	No.	Games	Totals							Averages (per game)						
Season	Team	No.	Games	G	B	K	H	D	M	T	G	B	K	H	D	M	T
2021	Collingwood	20	9	3	1	29	24	53	8	12	0.3	0.1	3.2	2.7	5.9	0.9	1.3
2022 (S6)	Collingwood	35	0	—	—	—	—	—	—	—	—	—	—	—	—	—	—
2022 (S7)	Collingwood	35	8	1	1	41	19	60	8	25	0.1	0.1	5.1	2.4	7.5	1.0	3.1
2023	Collingwood	35	4	0	0	9	5	14	4	4	0.0	0.0	2.3	1.3	3.5	1.0	1.0
Career			21	4	2	79	48	127	20	41	0.2	0.1	3.8	2.3	6.0	1.0	2.0
