= Charlotte Blair =

Australian rules footballer

Personal information
- Born: 6 April 2004 (age 22)
- Original teams: Dandenong Stingrays (U18); Casey Demons (VFLW)
- Draft: No. 56, 2022 AFL Women's draft
- Debut: Round 10, 2023, Collingwood vs. Richmond, at Victoria Park
- Height: 169 cm (5 ft 7 in)
- Position: midfielder

Playing career^{1}
| Years | Club | Games (Goals) |
| 2022–2024 | Collingwood | 7 (0) |
- ^{1} Playing statistics correct to the end of the 2024 season.

Charlotte Blair (born 6 April 2004) is an Australian rules footballer who played for Collingwood in the AFL Women's (AFLW). A midfielder, she played junior football in the TAC Cup Girls with the Dandenong Stingrays and VFL Women's with the Casey Demons, and Victorian Country Under 18 side. She was recruited by Collingwood with pick 56 in the 2022 AFL Women's draft and debuted in the closing round match of the 2023 AFL Women's season.

== Biography ==
Blair was born on 6 April 2004. She played junior Australian rules football for Devon Meadows and Cranbourne, and for the Dandenong Stingrays in the Talent League Girls under-18 competition, averaging 11.95 disposals per match during her three seasons there, with double-digit disposal counts in all but one of the ten games of her final season. She represented Vic Country in the 2022 Under-18 championships. In 2022, Blair also played five games in the VFL Women's competition for the Casey Demons, including the semi-final and preliminary final matches. She was drafted by Collingwood with pick 56 on the 2022 AFL Women's draft Although she normally played as a forward, Collingwood classed her as a midfielder due to her athleticism and high work rate. She made her AFLW debut in the closing round match of the 2023 AFL Women's season against Richmond at Victoria Park. In November 2024, Blair was delisted by Collingwood.

== Statistics ==
Statistics are correct to the end of the 2024 season.

Legend
| G | Goals | K | Kicks | D | Disposals | T | Tackles |
| B | Behinds | H | Handballs | M | Marks |

| Season | Team | No. | Games | Totals | | | | | | | Averages (per game) | | | | | | |
| Season | Team | No. | Games | G | B | K | H | D | M | T | G | B | K | H | D | M | T |
|---|---|---|---|---|---|---|---|---|---|---|---|---|---|---|---|---|---|
| 2023 | Collingwood | 28 | 1 | 0 | 0 | 5 | 2 | 7 | 3 | 1 | 0.0 | 0.0 | 5.0 | 2.0 | 7.0 | 3.0 | 1.0 |
| 2024 | Collingwood | 28 | 6 | 0 | 0 | 29 | 11 | 40 | 3 | 15 | 0.0 | 0.0 | 4.8 | 1.8 | 6.7 | 0.5 | 2.5 |
| Career | | | 7 | 0 | 0 | 34 | 13 | 47 | 6 | 16 | 0.0 | 0.0 | 4.9 | 1.9 | 6.7 | 0.9 | 2.3 |
