= 2021 Collingwood Football Club season =

Collingwood Football Club
2021 season
- President: Eddie McGuire^{(until 9 February 2021)} Mark Korda & Peter Murphy (interim co-presidents)^{(from 10 February until 21 April 2021)} Mark Korda^{(from 21 April 2021)}
- Coach: See below
- Captain: See below
- Home ground: See below
- Regular season: See below
- Finals series: See below

The 2021 Collingwood Football Club season was the club's 125th season of senior competition in the Australian Football League (AFL). The club also fielded its reserves team in the Victorian Football League and women's teams in the AFL Women's and VFL Women's competitions.

== Overview ==
Collingwood's 2021 season overview
Team	Captain(s)	Coach	Home ground	W–L–D	Ladder	Finals	Best and fairest	Leading goalkicker	Refs
AFL	Scott Pendlebury	Nathan Buckley (until 14 June 2021); Robert Harvey (interim) (from 15 June 2021)	Melbourne Cricket Ground	6–16–0	17th	DNQ	Jack Crisp	Brody Mihocek (34)	
AFLW	Steph Chiocci & Brianna Davey	Stephen Symonds	Victoria Park	7–2–0	3rd	Preliminary final	Brianna Davey	Chloe Molloy (16)	
VFL	Lachlan Tardrew & Campbell Hustwaite	Craig Black	Victoria Park & Holden Centre	6–3–0	7th^{[c]}	Cancelled	Lachlan Tardrew	Jack Ginnivan (16)	
VFLW	Caitlin Bunker	Chloe McMillan	Victoria Park	14–0–0	1st	Cancelled	Imogen Barnett	Imogen Barnett (21)	

== Squad ==
Players are listed by guernsey number, and 2021 statistics are for AFL regular season and finals series matches during the 2021 AFL season only. Career statistics include a player's complete AFL career, which, as a result, means that a player's debut and part or whole of their career statistics may be for another club. Statistics are correct as of Round 23 of the 2021 season (22 August 2021) and are taken from AFL Tables.

No.	Name	AFL debut	Games (2021)	Goals (2021)	Games (CFC)	Goals (CFC)	Games (AFL career)	Goals (AFL career)
1	Jay Rantall	2021	5	0	5	0	5	0
2	Jordan De Goey	2015	20	23	118	155	118	155
3	Isaac Quaynor	2019	20	1	35	1	35	1
4	Brodie Grundy	2013	20	12	171	58	171	58
5	Jamie Elliott	2012	13	25	136	199	136	199
6	Tyler Brown	2020	7	0	16	2	16	2
7	Josh Daicos	2017	17	9	52	26	52	26
8	Trent Bianco	2021	12	7	12	7	12	7
9	John Noble	2019	22	2	44	4	44	4
10	Scott Pendlebury (c)	2006	18	4	334	183	334	183
11	Mark Keane	2020	4	0	5	0	5	0
12	Tom Wilson	2021	4	0	4	0	4	0
13	Taylor Adams	2012 (Greater Western Sydney)	14	2	134	49	165	61
14	Darcy Cameron	2018 (Sydney)	18	22	28	26	29	26
15	Max Lynch	2020	2	0	3	0	3	0
16	Chris Mayne	2008 (Fremantle)	17	0	76	11	248	207
17	Callum Brown	2017	15	3	64	22	64	22
18	Finlay Macrae	2021	9	1	9	1	9	1
19	Levi Greenwood	2009 (North Melbourne)	2	0	86	31	160	57
20	Will Kelly	2020	2	0	3	1	3	1
21	Trey Ruscoe	2020	9	2	13	7	13	7
22	Steele Sidebottom	2009	21	8	264	174	264	174
23	Jordan Roughead	2010 (Western Bulldogs)	21	0	62	1	200	35
24	Josh Thomas	2013	20	12	123	101	123	101
25	Jack Crisp	2012 (Brisbane Lions)	22	2	157	41	175	51
26	Reef McInnes	****	0	0	0	0	0	0
27	Caleb Poulter	2021	11	2	11	2	11	2
28	Nathan Murphy	2018	15	1	17	1	17	1
29	Liam McMahon	****	0	0	0	0	0	0
30	Darcy Moore	2015	13	4	102	65	102	65
31	Beau McCreery	2021	13	11	13	11	13	11
32	Will Hoskin-Elliott	2012 (Greater Western Sydney)	20	13	105	103	157	145
33	Jack Ginnivan	2021	5	6	5	6	5	6
34	Isaac Chugg	****	0	0	0	0	0	0
35	Oliver Henry	2021	10	7	10	7	10	7
36	Brayden Sier	2018	6	1	27	6	27	6
37	Brayden Maynard	2015	22	1	138	16	138	16
38	Jeremy Howe	2011 (Melbourne)	8	1	95	10	195	90
39	Aiden Begg	****	0	0	0	0	0	0
40	Ash Johnson	****	0	0	0	0	0	0
41	Brody Mihocek	2018	21	34	79	124	79	124
43	Anton Tohill	2021	1	0	1	0	1	0
44	Jack Madgen	2018	19	1	40	1	40	1
46	Mason Cox	2016	7	8	76	93	76	93

=== Squad changes ===
==== In ====
No.	Name	Position	Previous club	via
35	(Victoria (state)) Oliver Henry	Utility	Geelong Falcons	AFL national draft, first round (pick No. 17)
18	(Victoria (state)) Finlay Macrae	Midfielder	Oakleigh Chargers	AFL national draft, first round (pick No. 19)
26	(Victoria (state)) Reef McInnes	Midfielder	Oakleigh Chargers	AFL national draft, first round (pick No. 23), Next Generation Academy selection
27	(South Australia) Caleb Poulter	Midfielder / Forward	Woodville-West Torrens	AFL national draft, second round (pick No. 30)
29	(Victoria (state)) Liam McMahon	Forward	Northern Knights	AFL national draft, second round (pick No. 31)
31	(South Australia) Beau McCreery	Forward	South Adelaide	AFL national draft, third round (pick No. 44)
33	(Victoria (state)) Jack Ginnivan	Forward	Bendigo Pioneers	AFL rookie draft, first round (pick No. 13)
34	(Tasmania) Isaac Chugg	Midfielder / Defender	Launceston	AFL rookie draft, second round (pick No. 28)
40	(Western Australia) Ash Johnson	Forward	Sturt	AFL mid-season draft, first round (pick No. 3)
39	(Victoria (state)) Aiden Begg	Ruck / Forward	Eastern Ranges	AFL mid-season draft, second round (pick No. 18)
	(Senegal) Bassirou Faye	Ruck	Oakleigh Chargers	International Rookie Scholarship

==== Out ====
No.	Name	Position	New Club	via
20	(Victoria (state)) Ben Reid	Defender / Forward		retired
18	(South Australia) Travis Varcoe	Forward		retired
15	(Victoria (state)) Lynden Dunn	Defender		retired
12	(South Australia) Matthew Scharenberg	Defender		delisted
29	(South Australia) Tim Broomhead	Midfielder		delisted
11	(Queensland) Dayne Beams	Midfielder		retired
1	(Victoria (state)) Jaidyn Stephenson	Midfielder	North Melbourne	trade
40	(Victoria (state)) Atu Bosenavulagi	Forward	North Melbourne	trade
7	(Victoria (state)) Adam Treloar	Midfielder	Western Bulldogs	trade
21	(Victoria (state)) Tom Phillips	Midfielder	Hawthorn	trade
31	(Victoria (state)) Flynn Appleby	Defender		delisted
33	(Victoria (state)) Rupert Wills	Midfielder / Forward		delisted
8	(Victoria (state)) Tom Langdon	Defender		retired
19	(South Australia) Levi Greenwood	Midfielder		retired

== AFL season ==
=== Pre-season matches ===
Collingwood's 2021 practice match and AAMI Community Series fixtures
Date and local time	Opponent	Scores^{[a]}			Venue	Attendance	Ref
Date and local time	Opponent	Home	Away	Result	Venue	Attendance	Ref
Friday, 26 February (11:00 am)	Geelong	11.8 (74)	11.6 (72)	Lost by 2 points	GMHBA Stadium [A]	0^{[b]}	
Friday, 5 March (7:10 pm)	Richmond	11.8 (74)	11.14 (80)	Lost by 6 points	Marvel Stadium [H]	10,308	

=== Regular season ===
Collingwood's 2021 AFL season fixture
Round	Date and local time	Opponent	Home	Away	Result	Venue	Attendance	Ladder position	Ref
Round	Date and local time	Opponent	Scores^{[a]}			Venue	Attendance	Ladder position	Ref
1	Friday, 19 March (7:50 pm)	Western Bulldogs	7.11 (53)	10.9 (69)	Lost by 16 points	MCG [H]	46,051	13th	
2	Thursday, 25 March (7:20 pm)	Carlton	13.7 (85)	16.10 (106)	Won by 21 points	MCG [A]	51,723	9th	
3	Thursday, 1 April (6:40 pm)	Brisbane Lions	11.6 (72)	11.7 (73)	Lost by 1 point	Marvel Stadium [H]	28,057	11th	
4	Saturday, 10 April (7:25 pm)	Greater Western Sydney	9.6 (60)	14.6 (90)	Lost by 30 points	MCG [H]	29,866	14th	
5	Friday, 16 April (6:10 pm)	West Coast	16.7 (103)	11.10 (76)	Lost by 27 points	Optus Stadium [A]	54,159	16th	
6	Sunday, 25 April (3:20 pm)	Essendon	13.7 (85)	16.13 (109)	Lost by 24 points	MCG [H]	78,113	17th	
7	Saturday, 1 May (1:45 pm)	Gold Coast	7.13 (55)	12.7 (79)	Lost by 24 points	MCG [H]	24,397	17th	
8	Saturday, 8 May (4:35 pm)	North Melbourne	11.10 (76)	14.10 (94)	Won by 18 points	Marvel Stadium [A]	22,329	16th	
9	Saturday, 15 May (1:45 pm)	Sydney	10.12 (72)	5.12 (42)	Lost by 30 points	SCG [A]	31,448	16th	
10	Sunday, 23 May (3:20 pm)	Port Adelaide	8.10 (58)	8.11 (59)	Lost by 1 point	MCG [H]	23,415	16th	
11	Saturday, 29 May (1:45 pm)	Geelong	6.15 (51)	8.13 (61)	Lost by 10 points	MCG [H]	0^{[b]}	16th	
12	Saturday, 5 June (4:35 pm)	Adelaide	10.13 (73)	12.6 (78)	Won by 5 points	Adelaide Oval [A]	30,446	16th	
13	Monday, 14 June (3:20 pm)	Melbourne	9.9 (63)	11.14 (80)	Won by 17 points	MCG [A]	16,453	16th	
14	Bye							15th	Bye
15	Saturday, 26 June (4:35 pm)	Fremantle	12.7 (79)	14.7 (91)	Lost by 12 points	Marvel Stadium [H]	11,570	15th	
16	Sunday, 4 July (3:20 pm)	St Kilda	8.13 (61)	10.10 (70)	Lost by 9 points	MCG [H]	18,082	16th	
17	Sunday, 11 July (4:10 pm)	Richmond	11.5 (71)	13.9 (87)	Won by 16 points	MCG [A]	29,437	15th	
18	Sunday, 18 July (3:20 pm)	Carlton	9.8 (62)	13.13 (91)	Lost by 29 points	MCG [H]	0^{[b]}	15th	
19	Friday, 23 July (7:15 pm)	Port Adelaide	14.13 (97)	10.9 (69)	Lost by 28 points	Marvel Stadium [A]	0^{[b]}	16th	
20	Saturday, 31 July (4:15 pm)	West Coast	14.6 (90)	6.9 (45)	Won by 45 points	MCG [H]	0^{[b]}	14th	
21	Sunday, 8 August (2:10 pm)	Hawthorn	15.7 (97)	12.6 (78)	Lost by 19 points	MCG [A]	0^{[b]}	16th	
22	Saturday, 14 August (7:25 pm)	Brisbane Lions	22.10 (142)	8.9 (57)	Lost by 85 points	Gabba [A]	15,146	16th	
23	Sunday, 22 August (3:20 pm)	Essendon	16.6 (102)	9.10 (64)	Lost by 38 points	MCG [A]	0^{[b]}	17th	

=== Ladder ===
Pos	Team	Pld	W	L	D	PF	PA	PP	Pts	Qualification
1	Melbourne (P)	22	17	4	1	1888	1443	130.8	70	Finals series
2	Port Adelaide	22	17	5	0	1884	1492	126.3	68	Finals series
3	Geelong	22	16	6	0	1845	1456	126.7	64	Finals series
4	Brisbane Lions	22	15	7	0	2131	1599	133.3	60	Finals series
5	Western Bulldogs	22	15	7	0	1994	1501	132.8	60	Finals series
6	Sydney	22	15	7	0	1986	1656	119.9	60	Finals series
7	Greater Western Sydney	22	11	10	1	1768	1773	99.7	46	Finals series
8	Essendon	22	11	11	0	1953	1790	109.1	44	Finals series
9	West Coast	22	10	12	0	1752	1880	93.2	40	
10	St Kilda	22	10	12	0	1644	1796	91.5	40	
11	Fremantle	22	10	12	0	1578	1825	86.5	40	
12	Richmond	22	9	12	1	1743	1780	97.9	38	
13	Carlton	22	8	14	0	1746	1972	88.5	32	
14	Hawthorn	22	7	13	2	1629	1912	85.2	32	
15	Adelaide	22	7	15	0	1616	1971	82.0	28	
16	Gold Coast	22	7	15	0	1430	1863	76.8	28	
17	Collingwood	22	6	16	0	1557	1818	85.6	24	
18	North Melbourne	22	4	17	1	1458	2075	70.3	18	

Updated to match(es) played on 21 August 2021. Source: AFL
Rules for classification: 1) points; 2) percentage; 3) number of points for.
(P) Premiers

=== Awards & Milestones ===
==== AFL Awards ====
- Neale Daniher Trophy – Scott Pendlebury (Round 13)
- 2021 22under22 selection – Isaac Quaynor

==== Club Awards ====
- E.W. Copeland Trophy – Jack Crisp
- R.T. Rush Trophy – Brayden Maynard
- J.J. Joyce Trophy – Scott Pendlebury
- J.F. McHale Trophy – Jordan De Goey
- Jack Regan Trophy – Steele Sidebottom
- Joseph Wren Memorial Trophy – Lachlan Tardrew
- Darren Millane Memorial Trophy – Jordan Roughead
- Harry Collier Trophy – Oliver Henry
- Gordon Coventry Trophy – Brody Mihocek
- Gavin Brown Award – Steele Sidebottom

==== Milestones ====
- Round 1 – Oliver Henry (AFL debut)
- Round 1 – Callum Brown (50 games)
- Round 2 – Jordan De Goey (100 games)
- Round 3 – Beau McCreery (AFL debut)
- Round 5 – Finlay Macrae (AFL debut)
- Round 5 – Brody Mihocek (100 goals)
- Round 6 – Jay Rantall (AFL debut)
- Round 7 – Caleb Poulter (AFL debut)
- Round 8 – Steele Sidebottom (250 games)
- Round 9 – Tom Wilson (AFL debut)
- Round 10 – Jordan Roughead (50 Collingwood games)
- Round 11 – Trent Bianco (AFL debut)
- Round 11 – Darcy Moore (100 games)
- Round 16 – Josh Daicos (50 games)
- Round 16 – Jack Crisp (150 Collingwood games)
- Round 16 – Will Hoskin-Elliott (100 Collingwood goals)
- Round 17 – Will Hoskin-Elliott (100 Collingwood games)
- Round 19 – Jack Ginnivan (AFL debut)
- Round 19 – Anton Tohill (AFL debut)
- Round 22 – Josh Thomas (100 goals)
- Round 23 – Jordan Roughead (200 AFL games)

== VFL season ==
=== Pre-season matches ===
Collingwood's 2021 VFL pre-season fixtures
Date and local time	Opponent	Scores^{[a]}			Venue	Ref
Date and local time	Opponent	Home	Away	Result	Venue	Ref
Saturday, 6 March (10:00 am)	Box Hill	11.8 (74)	14.11 (95)	Lost by 21 points	Holden Centre [H]	
Friday, 19 March (4:30 pm)	Footscray	15.12 (102)	14.9 (93)	Won by 9 points	Holden Centre [H]	
Saturday, 3 April (2:00 pm)	Richmond	14.12 (96)	9.14 (68)	Lost by 28 points	Punt Road Oval [A]	
Saturday, 10 April (12:00 pm)	Geelong	8.10 (58)	7.4 (46)	Lost by 12 points	Deakin University Waurn Ponds [A]	

=== Regular season ===
Collingwood's 2021 VFL season fixture
Round	Date and local time	Opponent	Home	Away	Result	Venue	Ladder position	Ref
Round	Date and local time	Opponent	Scores^{[a]}			Venue	Ladder position	Ref
1	Saturday, 17 April (2:30 pm)	Werribee	9.8 (62)	10.9 (69)	Won by 7 points	Avalon Airport Oval [A]	10th	
2	Saturday, 24 April (12:00 pm)	Essendon	6.14 (50)	12.13 (85)	Lost by 35 points	Victoria Park [H]	14th	
3	Friday, 30 April (4:00 pm)	Gold Coast	9.12 (66)	9.7 (61)	Won by 5 points	Holden Centre [H]	9th	
4	Saturday, 8 May (12:05 pm)	Coburg	14.11 (95)	13.13 (91)	Won by 4 points	Victoria Park [H]	7th	
5	Saturday, 15 May (4:45 pm)	Sydney	12.14 (86)	8.5 (53)	Lost by 33 points	SCG [A]	8th	
6	Bye						10th	Bye
7	Cancelled						10th	Cancelled
8	Cancelled						11th	Cancelled
9	Cancelled						11th	Cancelled
10	Bye						11th	Bye
11	Saturday, 26 June (12:05 pm)	Frankston	16.8 (104)	9.11 (65)	Won by 39 points	Holden Centre [H]	8th	
12	Sunday, 4 July (12:00 pm)	Sandringham	11.15 (81)	10.3 (63)	Won by 18 points	Holden Centre [H]	7th	
13	Sunday, 11 July (12:00 pm)	Richmond	15.11 (101)	16.10 (106)	Won by 5 points	Punt Road Oval [A]	7th	
14	Cancelled						9th	Cancelled
15	Bye						8th	Bye
16	Saturday, 31 July (12:05 pm)	Box Hill	9.6 (60)	18.15 (123)	Lost by 63 points	Holden Centre [H]	9th	
17	Cancelled						9th	Cancelled
18	Cancelled						7th^{[c]}	Cancelled
19	Cancelled						7th^{[c]}	Cancelled

=== Finals series ===
Collingwood's 2021 VFL finals series fixtures
Round	Date and time	Opponent	Home	Away	Result	Venue	Attendance	Ref
Round	Date and time	Opponent	Scores^{[a]}			Venue	Attendance	Ref
Qualifying final	Cancelled	Southport	Cancelled					

=== Ladder ===
Pos	Team	Pld	W	L	D	PF	PA	PP	Pts	M/R	Qualification
1	Footscray (R)	10	10	0	0	976	575	169.7	40	100	Finals series (cancelled)
2	Southport	10	9	1	0	1168	651	180.7	36	90	Finals series (cancelled)
3	Box Hill	10	8	2	0	1085	647	167.7	32	80	Finals series (cancelled)
4	Geelong (R)	9	7	2	0	885	529	167.3	28	78	Finals series (cancelled)
5	Casey	9	7	2	0	818	491	166.6	28	78	Finals series (cancelled)
6	Williamstown	9	6	2	1	768	563	136.4	26	72	Finals series (cancelled)
7	Collingwood (R)	9	6	3	0	683	738	92.5	24	67	Finals series (cancelled)
8	Greater Western Sydney (R)	11	7	4	0	819	868	94.4	28	64	Finals series (cancelled)
9	Werribee	9	5	4	0	851	577	147.5	20	56	
10	Frankston	11	6	5	0	903	870	103.8	24	55	
11	Richmond (R)	10	4	5	1	822	795	103.4	18	45	
12	Carlton (R)	9	4	5	0	790	780	101.3	16	44	
13	Sandringham	9	4	5	0	755	801	94.3	16	44	
14	Gold Coast (R)	10	4	6	0	753	975	77.2	16	40	
15	North Melbourne (R)	10	4	6	0	578	1015	57.0	16	40	
16	Coburg	10	3	7	0	773	813	95.1	12	30	
17	Brisbane (R)	10	3	7	0	732	1115	65.7	12	30	
18	Northern Bullants	10	3	7	0	618	987	62.6	12	30	
19	Sydney (R)	10	2	8	0	721	811	88.9	8	20	
20	Essendon (R)	10	2	8	0	591	916	64.5	8	20	
21	Port Melbourne	9	1	8	0	565	839	67.3	4	11	
22	Aspley	10	1	9	0	806	1104	73.0	4	10	

Rules for classification: 1) match ratio; 2) points; 3) percentage; 4) number of points for.
(R) = Reserves

== AFLW season ==
=== Pre-season matches ===
Collingwood's 2021 AFLW pre-season fixture
Date and local time	Opponent	Home	Away	Result	Venue	Ref
Date and local time	Opponent	Scores^{[a]}			Venue	Ref
Sunday, 17 January	North Melbourne	7.5 (47)	5.5 (35)	Won by 12 points	Ikon Park [H]	

=== Regular season ===
Collingwood's 2021 AFL Women's season fixture
Round	Date and time	Opponent	Home	Away	Result	Venue	Attendance	Ladder position	Ref
Round	Date and time	Opponent	Scores^{[a]}			Venue	Attendance	Ladder position	Ref
1	Thursday, 28 January (7:10 pm)	Carlton	4.3 (27)	5.3 (33)	Won by 6 points	Ikon Park [A]	6,712	6th	
2	Saturday, 6 February (3:10 pm)	Geelong	6.9 (45)	2.4 (16)	Won by 29 points	Victoria Park [H]	2,938	6th	
3	Sunday, 14 February (3:10 pm)	Richmond	4.7 (31)	7.6 (48)	Won by 17 points	Swinburne Centre [A]	0^{[b]}	3rd	
4	Saturday, 20 February (7:10 pm)	North Melbourne	0.8 (8)	4.4 (28)	Won by 20 points	Marvel Stadium [A]	2,254	2nd	
5	Sunday, 28 February (3:10 pm)	Melbourne	7.7 (49)	1.8 (14)	Won by 35 points	Victoria Park [H]	2,931	1st	
6	Sunday, 7 March (2:40 pm)	Western Bulldogs	7.9 (51)	2.3 (15)	Won by 36 points	Victoria Park [H]	3,017	1st	
7	Sunday, 14 March (3:10 pm)	Brisbane	4.11 (38)	4.8 (35)	Lost by 3 points	VU Whitten Oval [A]	0^{[b]}	3rd	
8	Saturday, 20 March (3:10 pm)	St Kilda	8.11 (59)	2.1 (13)	Won by 46 points	Victoria Park [H]	2,228	2nd	
9	Sunday, 28 March (12:10 pm)	Adelaide	4.7 (31)	2.5 (17)	Lost by 14 points	Norwood Oval [A]	2,314	3rd	

=== Finals series ===
Collingwood's 2021 AFL Women's finals series fixtures
Round	Date and time	Opponent	Home	Away	Result	Venue	Attendance	Ref
Round	Date and time	Opponent	Scores^{[a]}			Venue	Attendance	Ref
Qualifying final	Saturday, 3 April (3:10 pm)	North Melbourne	7.8 (50)	7.2 (44)	Won by 6 points	Victoria Park [H]	3,010	
Preliminary final	Saturday, 10 April (4:10 pm)	Brisbane	7.3 (45)	6.5 (41)	Lost by 4 points	Gabba [A]	4,435	
Collingwood was eliminated from the 2021 AFLW finals series

=== Ladder ===
Pos	Team	Pld	W	L	D	PF	PA	PP	Pts	Qualification
1	Adelaide	9	7	2	0	446	214	208.4	28	Finals series
2	Brisbane Lions (P)	9	7	2	0	390	200	195.0	28	Finals series
3	Collingwood	9	7	2	0	362	190	190.5	28	Finals series
4	Melbourne	9	7	2	0	382	293	130.4	28	Finals series
5	Fremantle	9	6	3	0	374	202	185.1	24	Finals series
6	North Melbourne	9	6	3	0	379	266	142.5	24	Finals series
7	Carlton	9	5	4	0	415	330	125.8	20	
8	Western Bulldogs	9	5	4	0	300	340	88.2	20	
9	Greater Western Sydney	9	4	5	0	240	324	74.1	16	
10	Richmond	9	3	6	0	312	369	84.6	12	
11	St Kilda	9	3	6	0	272	391	69.6	12	
12	West Coast	9	2	7	0	229	432	53.0	8	
13	Geelong	9	1	8	0	164	408	40.2	4	
14	Gold Coast	9	0	9	0	176	482	36.5	0	

Updated to match(es) played on 17 March 2021. Source: Womens.AFL
Rules for classification: 1) points; 2) percentage; 3) number of points for.
(P) Premiers

=== Squad ===
Players are listed by guernsey number, and 2021 statistics are for AFL Women's regular season and finals series matches during the 2021 AFL Women's season only. Career statistics include a player's complete AFL Women's career, which, as a result, means that a player's debut and part or whole of their career statistics may be for another club. Statistics are correct as of the preliminary final of the 2021 season (10 April 2021) and are taken from Australian Football.

No.	Name	AFLW debut	Games (2021)	Goals (2021)	Games (CFC)	Goals (CFC)	Games (AFLW career)	Goals (AFLW career)
1	Sharni Norder	2019	10	2	23	5	23	5
2	Chloe Molloy	2018	11	16	25	23	25	23
3	Brianna Davey (c)	2017 (Carlton)	11	6	17	6	34	9
4	Abbey Green	2020 (North Melbourne)	0	0	0	0	2	0
5	Amelia Velardo	2021	2	0	2	0	2	0
6	Jordyn Allen	2019	6	0	20	2	20	2
7	Sarah Rowe	2019	7	1	21	8	21	8
8	Brittany Bonnici	2017	11	0	39	1	39	1
9	Alana Porter	2020	11	0	18	0	18	0
10	Ashleigh Brazill	2018	4	1	16	1	16	1
11	Imogen Purcell	****	0	0	0	0	0	0
12	Stacey Livingstone	2017	11	0	34	0	34	0
13	Jaimee Lambert	2017 (Western Bulldogs)	11	4	32	11	38	16
14	Aishling Sheridan	2020	11	8	18	10	18	10
15	Erica Fowler	2019	10	0	19	0	19	0
16	Aliesha Newman	2017 (Melbourne)	7	3	7	3	32	14
17	Steph Chiocci (c)	2017	11	0	37	5	37	5
18	Ruby Schleicher	2017	11	2	29	2	29	2
19	Bella Smith	2021	6	0	6	0	6	0
20	Joanna Lin	2021	9	3	9	3	9	3
21	Jordan Membrey	2017 (Brisbane)	3	1	13	10	18	11
22	Sophie Casey	2017	10	0	32	2	32	2
23	Lauren Butler	2019	7	0	17	0	17	0
24	Sophie Alexander	2019	11	6	20	10	20	10
25	Mikala Cann	2019	11	2	22	3	22	3
26	Tarni Brown	2021	11	4	11	4	11	4
35	Maddie Shevlin	2019	3	0	13	1	13	1
40	Abbi Moloney	2021	2	2	2	2	2	2
41	Kristy Stratton	2018	3	1	11	1	11	1
50	Ebony O'Dea	2020	10	0	14	0	14	0

==== Squad changes ====
In

No.	Name	Position	Previous club	via
4	(Tasmania) Abbey Green	Ruck	North Melbourne	trade
16	(Victoria (state)) Aliesha Newman	Forward	Melbourne	trade
11	(Victoria (state)) Imogen Purcell	Defender		rookie signing
26	(Victoria (state)) Tarni Brown	Midfielder	Eastern Ranges	AFLW National Draft, second round (pick no. 19)
5	(Victoria (state)) Amelia Velardo	Ruck	Western Jets	AFLW National Draft, second round (pick no. 25)
20	(Victoria (state)) Joanna Lin	Midfielder	Oakleigh Chargers	AFLW National Draft, second round (pick no. 26)
40	(Victoria (state)) Abbi Moloney	Forward	Sandringham Dragons	AFLW National Draft, third round (pick no. 31)
19	(South Australia) Bella Smith	Defender	Norwood	undrafted free agency

Out

No.	Name	Position	New Club	via
5	(Victoria (state)) Emma Grant	Utility		retired
11	(Victoria (state)) Eliza Hynes	Forward / Ruck		retired
32	(Victoria (state)) Georgia Gourlay	Defender / Midfielder		delisted
33	(Northern Territory) Machaelia Roberts	Forward		retired
4	(Victoria (state)) Sarah D'Arcy	Forward	Richmond	trade
46	(Victoria (state)) Sarah Dargan	Forward / Midfielder	Richmond	trade
16	(Victoria (state)) Katie Lynch	Forward / Midfielder	Western Bulldogs	trade
20	(Victoria (state)) Kaila Bentvelzen	Forward		retired

=== League awards ===
- 2021 22under22 selection – Chloe Molloy (captain), Jordyn Allen, Mikala Cann
- 2021 AFL Women's All-Australian team – Brianna Davey (captain), Brittany Bonnici, Chloe Molloy, Ruby Schleicher
- 2021 AFL Women's best and fairest – Brianna Davey

=== Club Awards ===
- Best and fairest – Brianna Davey
- Best first year player – Tarni Brown
- Players' player award – Brianna Davey
- Leading goalkicker – Chloe Molloy (16 goals)

== VFLW season ==
=== Pre-season matches ===
Collingwood played two VFLW practice matches prior to the start of the regular season. They lost to Casey by three points in their first match at Holden Centre, and defeated North Melbourne by 83 points at Arden Street Oval.

=== Regular season ===
Collingwood's 2021 VFL Women's season fixture
Round	Date and local time	Opponent	Home	Away	Result	Venue	Ladder position	Ref
Round	Date and local time	Opponent	Scores^{[a]}			Venue	Ladder position	Ref
1	Saturday, 27 February (12:00 pm)	Geelong Cats	6.6 (42)	7.2 (44)	Won by 2 points	Deakin University Waurn Ponds [A]	6th	
2	Saturday, 6 March (12:00 pm)	Southern Saints	7.4 (46)	3.6 (24)	Won by 22 points	Victoria Park [H]	2nd	
3	Friday, 12 March (8:00 pm)	Western Bulldogs	3.0 (18)	10.10 (70)	Won by 52 points	VU Whitten Oval [A]	2nd	
4	Sunday, 21 March (11:00 am)	Hawthorn	3.10 (28)	2.1 (13)	Won by 15 points	Victoria Park [H]	2nd	
5	Saturday, 27 March (10:00 am)	Casey	8.4 (52)	3.6 (24)	Won by 28 points	Victoria Park [H]	2nd	
6	Sunday, 11 April (2:00 pm)	Carlton	2.10 (22)	0.4 (4)	Won by 18 points	Victoria Park [H]	2nd	
7	Saturday, 17 April (10:00 am)	Southern Saints	4.2 (26)	6.5 (41)	Won by 15 points	Trevor Barker Beach Oval [A]	2nd	
8	Sunday, 25 April (11:00 am)	Essendon	4.4 (28)	5.8 (38)	Won by 10 points	The Hangar [A]	1st	
9	Saturday, 1 May (2:00 pm)	Williamstown	0.2 (2)	11.3 (69)	Won by 67 points	Downer Oval [A]	1st	
10	Saturday, 8 May (2:00 pm)	North Melbourne	2.1 (13)	10.15 (75)	Won by 62 points	Arden Street Oval [A]	1st	
11	Saturday, 15 May (10:45 am)	Port Melbourne	1.4 (10)	8.4 (52)	Won by 42 points	ETU Stadium [A]	1st	
12	Saturday, 22 May (12:00 pm)	Darebin	3.3 (21)	11.6 (72)	Won by 51 points	Bill Lawry Oval [A]	1st	
13	Saturday, 19 June (12:00 pm)	Western Bulldogs	11.6 (72)	1.2 (8)	Won by 64 points	Holden Centre [H]	1st	
14	Saturday, 26 June (12:00 pm)	Geelong Cats	3.5 (23)	0.4 (4)	Won by 19 points	Victoria Park [H]	1st	

=== Finals series ===
Collingwood's 2021 VFL Women's finals series fixtures
Round	Date and time	Opponent	Home	Away	Result	Venue	Ref
Round	Date and time	Opponent	Scores^{[a]}			Venue	Ref
Qualifying final	Saturday, 3 July (12:00 pm)	Geelong Cats	4.2 (26)	2.8 (20)	Won by 6 points	Holden Centre [H]	
Semi final	Saturday, 10 July (12:00 pm)	Essendon	2.6 (18)	1.5 (11)	Won by 7 points	Victoria Park [H]	
Grand Final	Cancelled	Geelong Cats	Cancelled				

=== Ladder ===
Pos	Team	Pld	W	L	D	PF	PA	PP	Pts	Qualification
1	Collingwood	14	14	0	0	704	237	297.0	56	Finals series
2	Geelong Cats	14	10	4	0	570	327	174.3	40	Finals series
3	Port Melbourne	14	10	4	0	597	463	128.9	40	Finals series
4	Casey	14	8	6	0	641	410	156.3	32	Finals series
5	Essendon	14	8	6	0	523	336	155.7	32	Finals series
6	Southern Saints	14	7	7	0	508	441	115.2	28	Finals series
7	Western Bulldogs	14	7	7	0	424	559	75.8	28	
8	Carlton	14	6	8	0	437	548	79.7	24	
9	Hawthorn	14	5	9	0	500	531	94.2	20	
10	North Melbourne	14	5	9	0	390	619	63.0	20	
11	Williamstown	14	2	11	1	242	545	44.4	10	
12	Darebin	14	1	12	1	235	755	31.1	6	

Source: SportsTGAustralian Football
Rules for classification: 1) points; 2) percentage; 3) number of points for.

== Notes ==
Key

- H Home match.
- A Away match.

Notes

- **^{a}** Collingwood's scores are indicated in **bold** font.
- **^{b}** Match was played behind closed doors due to the COVID-19 pandemic.
- **^{c}** After the cancellation of the 18th round, due to the COVID-19 pandemic, the VFL ladder was reconfigured, since it became impossible to get all teams to the same numbers of matches for the season, and the ladder was changed to the match ratio system (with clubs ranked by percentage of matches won).

== See also ==
- 2021 Collingwood Magpies Netball season
