= Reef McInnes =

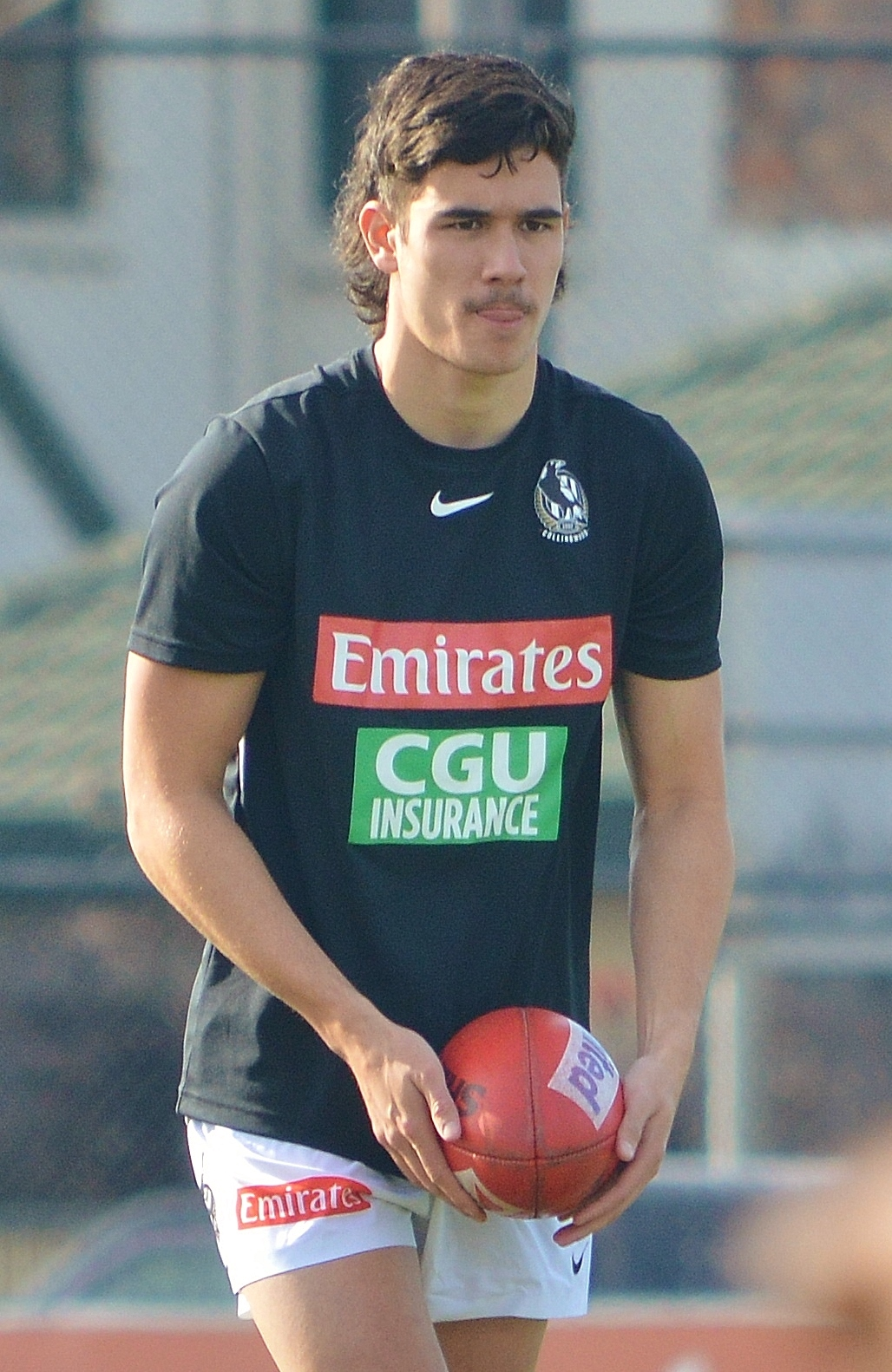
- McInnes with Collingwood's VFL team in July 2021

Personal information
- Full name: Reef McInnes
- Born: 12 December 2002 (age 23)
- Original team: Oakleigh Chargers (Talent League)
- Draft: No. 23, 2020 national draft
- Debut: 2 April 2022, Collingwood vs. Geelong, at MCG
- Height: 194 cm (6 ft 4 in)
- Weight: 90 kg (198 lb)
- Position: Forward

Club information
- Current club: Collingwood
- Number: 26

Playing career^{1}
| Years | Club | Games (Goals) |
| 2021– | Collingwood | 23 (19) |
- ^{1} Playing statistics correct to the end of the 2025 season.

Reef McInnes (born 12 December 2002) is a professional Australian rules footballer playing for the Collingwood Football Club in the Australian Football League (AFL).

== Junior and State Football ==
As a junior McInnes played for YJFL clubs Canterbury Cobras and Surrey Park Panthers. He became a member of Collingwood’s Next Generation Academy program, due to his mother being born in the Philippines. In 2019 Reef played for the Oakleigh Chargers and played 12 games and kicked 6 goals. McInnes played with future Collingwood teammates Finlay Macrae and Trent Bianco at the Oakleigh Chargers. McInnes played in the 2019 NAB League premiership with the Oakleigh Chargers. He also played for Scotch College alongside fellow 2020 draftees Jamarra Ugle-Hagan and Maurice Rioli Jr.

He was unable to play any football during his draft year of 2020, due to the impact of the COVID-19 pandemic in Victoria.

Before being drafted, McInnes supported Essendon and his Grandfather sponsored Mark Thompson.

== AFL career ==
Reef McInnes was selected at pick 23 for the Collingwood Magpies in the 2020 AFL national draft. In his first season with Collingwood he didn't get picked to play any games in the AFL. In 2022 McInnes got picked to play in round 3 against the Geelong Cats. Reef played six games in the 2022 AFL season. In round 1 of the 2023 season McInnes was selected as medi-sub. When he came got subbed into the game he kicked two goals. In round 2 against Port Adelaide he was the medi-sub again and got one disposal and kicked one goal. McInnes got dropped for round 3 and then got selected in round 4 against Brisbane.

== Statistics ==
Updated to the end of the 2025 season.

Legend
| G | Goals | K | Kicks | D | Disposals | T | Tackles |
| B | Behinds | H | Handballs | M | Marks |

| Season | Team | No. | Games | Totals | | | | | | | Averages (per game) | | | | | | | Votes |
| Season | Team | No. | Games | G | B | K | H | D | M | T | G | B | K | H | D | M | T | Votes |
|---|---|---|---|---|---|---|---|---|---|---|---|---|---|---|---|---|---|---|
| 2022 | Collingwood | 26 | 6 | 3 | 4 | 20 | 19 | 39 | 11 | 9 | 0.5 | 0.7 | 3.3 | 3.2 | 6.5 | 1.8 | 1.5 | 0 |
| 2023 | Collingwood | 26 | 5 | 3 | 1 | 11 | 7 | 18 | 8 | 3 | 0.6 | 0.2 | 2.2 | 1.4 | 3.6 | 1.6 | 0.6 | 0 |
| 2024 | Collingwood | 26 | 9 | 13 | 2 | 31 | 22 | 53 | 16 | 11 | 1.4 | 0.2 | 3.4 | 2.4 | 5.9 | 1.8 | 1.2 | 0 |
| 2025 | Collingwood | 26 | 3 | 0 | 0 | 17 | 7 | 24 | 9 | 3 | 0.0 | 0.0 | 5.7 | 2.3 | 8.0 | 3.0 | 1.0 | 0 |
| Career | | | 23 | 19 | 7 | 79 | 55 | 134 | 44 | 26 | 0.8 | 0.3 | 3.4 | 2.4 | 5.8 | 1.9 | 1.1 | 0 |
