= Tyler Brown (footballer) =

Australian rules footballer (born 1999)

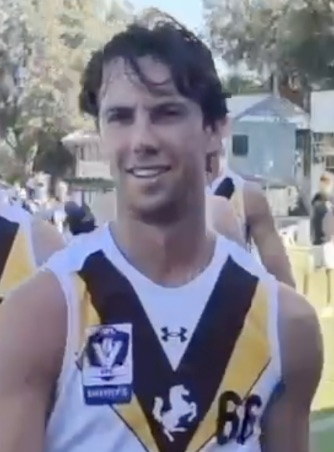
- Brown in 2026

Personal information
- Full name: Tyler Brown
- Born: 9 December 1999 (age 26)
- Original teams: Eastern Ranges, TAC Cup
- Draft: No. 50 (F/S), 2017 national draft
- Debut: Round 1, 2020, Collingwood vs. Western Bulldogs, at Marvel Stadium
- Height: 188 cm (6 ft 2 in)
- Weight: 77 kg (170 lb)
- Position: Midfielder

Playing career^{1}
Years	Club	Games (Goals)
2018–2022	Collingwood	27 (4)
2023	Adelaide	1 (0)
Total		28 (4)
- ^{1} Playing statistics correct to the end of end of 2023.

Tyler Brown (born 9 December 1999) is a former professional Australian rules footballer who played for the Collingwood Football Club and Adelaide Football Club in the Australian Football League (AFL). Son of 1994–1998 former Collingwood captain, Gavin Brown, he played for the Eastern Ranges in the TAC Cup before he was drafted to Collingwood in 2017 under the father–son rule.

== State football ==
Brown played junior football with Templestowe in the Yarra Junior Football League, together with his brother Callum. He also starred for his private school, Marcellin College, in football and in 2016 joined Eastern Ranges in the TAC Cup. In July 2017, Brown had a breakout game against Bendigo Pioneers leading to talent manager Len Villani saying he has the "Brown brain". Later, after averaging 15 disposals over 4 games, he was invited to the AFL Draft Combine at Etihad Stadium.

After being drafted to Collingwood, Brown played 18 Victorian Football League (VFL) games, demonstrating versatility on the wing and in defence.

== AFL career ==
=== Collingwood ===
Brown was drafted to Collingwood with the 50th pick of the 2017 AFL draft, which was Collingwood's third and final pick, under the father–son rule after Port Adelaide put in a bid for him. He has been compared to his father, Gavin Brown, with Eastern Ranges coach, Darren Bewick saying "he's a shy boy, very introverted in the way he goes about his business, but like his old man, he has a lot of ability." Brown got his first taste of senior football when he played in a pre-season match against Fremantle in the 2019 JLT Community Series. Despite not playing a senior game in his first two years at the club, he showed enough in the reserves to earn a contract extension until the end of 2020. In 2019, he was also often named as an emergency for the senior squad. He made his AFL debut in Collingwood's victory over Western Bulldogs in the opening round of the 2020 season at Marvel Stadium. Due to the COVID-19 pandemic, his debut was without a crowd.

After a 2022 AFL season in which both Brown and his brother Callum failed to establish themselves in new coach Craig McRae's best 22, both Brown brothers were delisted at the conclusion of that season.

=== Adelaide ===
The 27-game Pie found a new home prior to the 2023 AFL season, signing with the Adelaide Crows in the 2023 pre-season supplemental selection period alongside former Collingwood teammate Mark Keane. Brown was listed as an emergency for Adelaide's round one clash against Greater Western Sydney, and made his debut coming on as a substitute, only collecting one disposal and three tackles in the loss. Despite strong form for Adelaide's SANFL team, Brown did not return to the senior side in 2023 and was delisted following the season's conclusion.

Brown would go on to sign with Box Hill in the VFL for the 2024 season.

== Personal life ==
Brown is the son of former Collingwood captain, Gavin Brown, and brother of Callum. His sister, Tarni, was selected for the 2020 AFL Women's (AFLW) academy and was drafted by Collingwood in the 2020 AFL Women's draft under the father–daughter rule.

== Statistics ==
Statistics are correct to the end of the 2023 season

Legend
G	Goals	K	Kicks	D	Disposals	T	Tackles
B	Behinds	H	Handballs	M	Marks

Season	Team	No.	Games	Totals							Averages (per game)						
Season	Team	No.	Games	G	B	K	H	D	M	T	G	B	K	H	D	M	T
2018	Collingwood	34	0	—	—	—	—	—	—	—	—	—	—	—	—	—	—
2019	Collingwood	34	0	—	—	—	—	—	—	—	—	—	—	—	—	—	—
2020 (Note: The 2020 season was played with 17 home-and-away matches per team (down from 22) and 16-minute quarters with time on (down from 20-minute quarters with time on) due to the impact of the COVID-19 pandemic.)	Collingwood	6	9	2	0	45	61	106	14	13	0.2	0.0	5.0	6.8	11.8	1.6	1.4
2021	Collingwood	6	7	0	0	35	60	95	14	11	0.0	0.0	5.0	8.6	13.6	2.0	1.6
2022	Collingwood	6	11	2	0	28	43	71	7	34	0.2	0.0	2.5	3.9	6.5	0.6	3.1
2023	Adelaide	21	1	0	0	0	1	1	0	3	0.0	0.0	0.0	1.0	1.0	0.0	3.0
Career			28	4	0	108	165	273	35	61	0.1	0.0	3.9	5.9	9.8	1.3	2.2
