= Tarni Brown =

Australian rules footballer (born 2002)

Personal information
- Full name: Tarni Brown
- Born: 26 March 2002 (age 24)
- Original team: Eastern Ranges (NAB League Girls)
- Draft: No. 19, 2020 national draft (F/D)
- Debut: Round 1, 2021, Collingwood vs. Carlton, at Ikon Park
- Height: 166 cm (5 ft 5 in)
- Position: Midfielder

Playing career^{1}
Years	Club	Games (Goals)
2021–2023	Collingwood	34 (9)
2024–2025	Carlton	10 (2)
Total		44 (11)
- ^{1} Playing statistics correct to the end of the 2025 season.

Career highlights
- AFL Women's Rising Star nominee: 2021

Tarni Brown (born 26 March 2002) is a former professional Australian rules footballer who played for Collingwood and Carlton in the AFL Women's (AFLW). Daughter of 1994–1998 Collingwood captain Gavin Brown, she played for the Eastern Ranges in the NAB League Girls before she was drafted to Collingwood in 2020 under the father–daughter rule. During the trade period ahead of the 2024 season, she joined Carlton.

== Early life and state football ==
Brown started her sporting career playing basketball. She played for Nunawading Spectres in the Melbourne United Victorian Junior Basketball League (MUVJBL) Under 18 Girls competition, making 19 appearances.

Brown started playing football only at the age of 14, starting out with her local club Donvale. The next year, she joined Eastern Ranges in the NAB League Girls and played for them for three seasons. In the 2019 season, playing as a tough midfielder, she averaged five tackles per game over 10 games for Eastern Ranges and was then selected for the 2020 AFL Women's (AFLW) academy, a nine month program involving camps and training with the AFLW clubs. For the 2020 season, she was also included in Eastern Ranges' leadership group.

== AFLW career ==
Brown was drafted to Collingwood with the 19th pick of the 2020 AFL Women's draft, which was Collingwood's first pick, under the father–daughter rule. She received the number 26 guernsey, like her father. Brown played in her first official hit-out in the first practice match of the season, playing against North Melbourne at Ikon Park. Less than two weeks later, she made her debut in the first match of the 2021 AFL Women's season against Carlton at Ikon Park. In round 6 of the season, Brown received a nomination for the 2021 AFL Women's Rising Star award, after collecting 15 disposals, taking four marks, and scoring a goal against the Western Bulldogs. It was revealed Brown had signed on with Collingwood for two years on 10 June 2021. In March 2023, Brown signed a new two-year deal until the end of the 2024 AFL Women's season.

A year later, halfway through her contract, Brown was traded to Carlton in a four-way trade, with Annie Lee joining Collingwood in exchange. She played 10 games for the club in 2024, but was placed on the inactive list for the 2025 season due to a medical condition before announcing her retirement at the end of the season.

== Personal life ==
Brown is the daughter of former Collingwood captain, Gavin Brown, and the younger sister of Callum and Tyler, who both played for Collingwood's AFL team.

== Statistics ==
Legend
G	Goals	K	Kicks	D	Disposals	T	Tackles
B	Behinds	H	Handballs	M	Marks

Season	Team	No.	Games	Totals							Averages (per game)							Votes
Season	Team	No.	Games	G	B	K	H	D	M	T	G	B	K	H	D	M	T	Votes
2021	Collingwood	26	11	4	1	48	76	124	20	33	0.4	0.1	4.4	6.9	11.3	1.8	3.0	0
2022 (S6)	Collingwood	26	8	1	0	29	43	72	13	22	0.1	0.0	3.6	5.4	9.0	1.6	2.0	0
2022 (S7)	Collingwood	26	10	3	3	46	67	113	22	32	0.3	0.3	4.6	6.7	11.3	2.2	3.2	3
2023	Collingwood	26	5	1	0	19	19	38	4	13	0.2	0.0	3.8	3.8	7.6	0.8	2.6	0
2024	Carlton	26	10	2	2	42	58	100	14	32	0.2	0.2	4.2	5.8	10.0	1.4	3.2	0
2025	Carlton	26	0	—	—	—	—	—	—	—	—	—	—	—	—	—	—	0
Career			44	11	6	184	263	447	73	132	0.2	0.1	4.2	6.0	10.2	1.7	3.0	3
