= Tony Carafa =

Australian rules footballer

Personal information
- Full name: Tony Carafa
- Born: 26 August 1968 (age 58)
- Original team: Marcellin College
- Height: 175 cm (5 ft 9 in)
- Weight: 77 kg (170 lb)

Playing career^{1}
Years	Club	Games (Goals)
1987–1988	Fitzroy	16 (8)
- ^{1} Playing statistics correct to the end of 1988.

Tony Carafa (born 26 August 1968) is a former Australian rules footballer who represented the Fitzroy Football Club in the Victorian Football League (VFL) during the 1980s.

Carafa represented the Fitzroy Lions in 16 games before departing at the end of the 1988 season. Recruited from Marcellin College, Bulleen having played in the winning undefeated 1984 1st XVIII team alongside Gavin Brown (footballer) and Stephen Silvagni. Despite his short VFL career, Carafa, whose father is Italian, would later be listed as one of the original 148 players suggested for the Italian Team of the Century, though he did not make the final short list of 50, nor the final team.
