= Arthur Leach =

Australian rules footballer

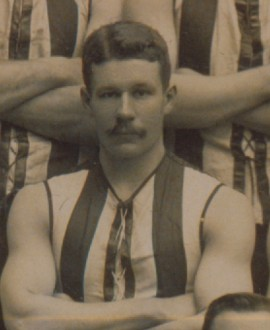
- Leach in 1902

Personal information
- Full name: Arthur Thomas Leach
- Born: 2 March 1876; Heidelberg, Victoria
- Died: 1 October 1948 (aged 72); Surrey Hills, Victoria
- Original team: Boroondara
- Debut: Round 9, 1897, Essendon vs. Collingwood, at Victoria Park

Playing career^{1}
Years	Club	Games (Goals)
1897	Essendon	4 (2)
1898–1908	Collingwood	173 (92)
Total		177 (94)
- ^{1} Playing statistics correct to the end of 1908.

Career highlights
- 2× VFL premiership player: 1902, 1903; Collingwood captain: 1906–1908

Arthur Thomas Leach (2 March 1876 – 1 October 1948) was an Australian rules footballer who played with Essendon and Collingwood during the early years of the Victorian Football League (VFL).

== Family ==
The son of Thomas Leach (1847–1916), and Emma Bunkin Leach (1847–1893), née Stuckey, Arthur Thomas Leach was born in Heidelberg, Victoria on 2 March 1876.

=== Brothers ===
His two brothers, John Frederick "Fred" Leach (1878–1908) and Edward Hale "Ted" Leach (1883–1965) also played for Collingwood.

== Football ==
Leach was used either on the ball or up forward.

=== Essendon VFL) ===
He joined Essendon in 1897 (the inaugural VFL season). His first match was Essendon's defeat of Collingwood (the team included his brother Ted) 6.10 (46) to 5.7 (37) at Victoria Park on 3 July 1897. In all he played in four games for Essendon and kicked 2 goals.

=== Collingwood VFL) ===
In 1898 crossed to Collingwood where he would spend the next 11 seasons. Leach played in a total of four Grand Finals, for premierships in 1902 and 1903.

He captained Collingwood for part of the 1906 season and for all of 1907.

== Law ==
On 15 July 1897, the Full Court ("consisting of the Chief Justice, Mr. Justice Holroyd, and Mr. Justice Hood") admitted Leach to practice as a barrister and solicitor in Victoria; and, along with William Rogers Thomson (1872–1932) — who was also treasurer of the Moonee Valley Racing Club and, later, Lord Mayor of Malvern (in 1914/15) — Arthur Thomas Leach was a partner in the firm of Leach and Thomson, Solicitors, 386 Bourke Street, Melbourne.

== Death ==
He died at Camberwell on 1 October 1948.
