= Michael Erwin =

Australian rules footballer

Personal information
- Born: 10 December 1965 (age 60)
- Original team: Marcellin College
- Height: 178 cm (5 ft 10 in)
- Weight: 74 kg (163 lb)

Playing career^{1}
Years	Club	Games (Goals)
1984–1985	Collingwood	3 (0)
- ^{1} Playing statistics correct to the end of 1985.

Michael Erwin (born 10 December 1965) is a former Australian rules footballer who played with Collingwood in the Victorian Football League (VFL). His father Mick Erwin was also a Collingwood footballer and coached the club in 1982.

Erwin, who played his early football at Marcellin College, played three senior games for Collingwood over the 1984 and 1985 seasons. His debut in 1984 came in Collingwood's round 18 win over Richmond, as a replacement for an injured Peter Daicos. The following year he played twice, before losing his spot in the team with a thigh injury.
