= Ted Leach =

Australian rules footballer

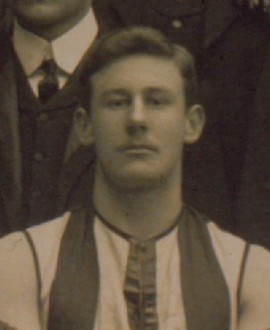
- Leach in 1902

Personal information
- Full name: Edward Hale Leach
- Born: 24 April 1883; Heidelberg, Victoria
- Died: 19 February 1965 (aged 81); Balwyn, Victoria
- Original team: Collegians

Playing career^{1}
Years	Club	Games (Goals)
1901–03	Collingwood	22 (9)
1904, 1909	Melbourne	23 (9)
Total		45 (18)
- ^{1} Playing statistics correct to the end of 1909.

Edward Hale Leach (24 April 1883 - 19 February 1965) was an Australian rules footballer who played with Collingwood and Melbourne in the Victorian Football League (VFL).

== Family ==
The son of Thomas Leach (1847-1916), and Emma Bunkin Leach (1847-1893), née Stuckey, Edward Hale Leach was born in Heidelberg, Victoria on 24 April 1883.

=== Wife ===
He married Amy Harriet Cougle (1880-1948) in 1904.

=== Brothers ===
His two brothers, Arthur Thomas Leach (1876–1948), and John Frederick "Fred" Leach (1878–1908) also played for Collingwood.

== Death ==
He died (suddenly) at his home in Balwyn, Victoria on 19 February 1965.
