= Callum Brown (footballer, born 1998) =

Australian rules footballer

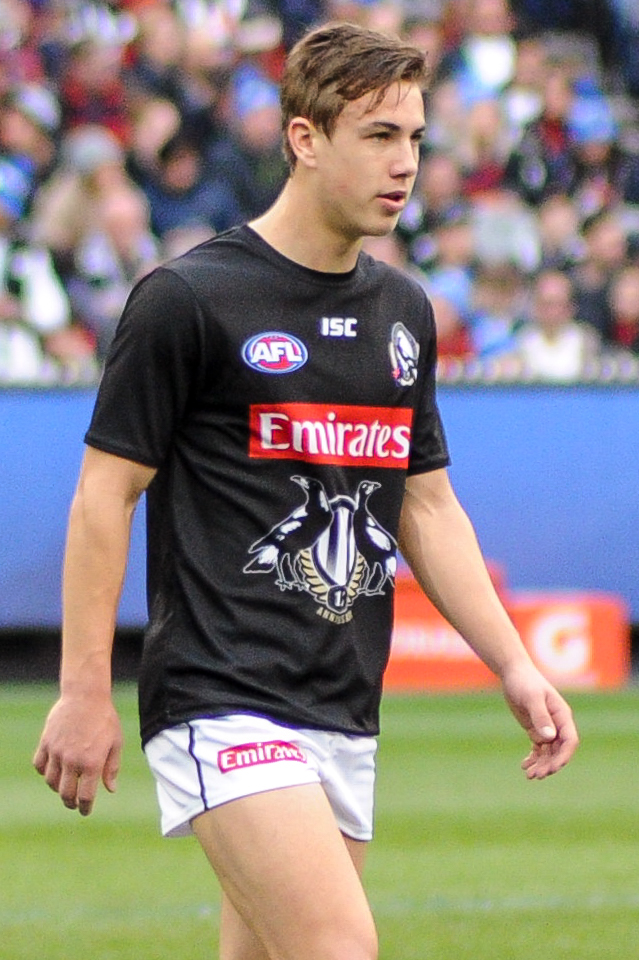
- Brown warming-up for Collingwood in June 2017

Personal information
- Full name: Callum L. Brown
- Born: 27 April 1998 (age 28)
- Original team: Eastern Ranges (TAC Cup)
- Draft: No. 35 (F/S), 2016 national draft
- Debut: 12 June 2017, Collingwood vs. Melbourne, at MCG
- Height: 178 cm (5 ft 10 in)
- Weight: 73 kg (161 lb)
- Position: Midfielder

Playing career^{1}
Years	Club	Games (Goals)
2017–2022	Collingwood	70 (23)
- ^{1} Playing statistics correct to the end of the 2022 season.

Callum L. Brown (born 27 April 1998) is a professional Australian rules footballer who currently plays for Box Hill in the Victorian Football League (VFL), having previously played for the Collingwood Football Club in the Australian Football League (AFL).

Son of former Collingwood captain, Gavin Brown, he played for the Eastern Ranges in the TAC Cup before he was drafted to Collingwood in 2016 under the father–son rule.

== Career ==
=== State football ===
Brown began playing in the TAC Cup with Oakleigh Chargers, but was cut from their under-16s and failed to make the under-18s. He then turned to the Eastern Ranges, where talent manager Len Villani pushed for him to join. He averaged 24 disposals over eight games and played in the 2015 TAC Cup Grand Final against Oakleigh Chargers. He also was selected for the 2016 TAC Cup Team of the Year.

Brown represented Vic Metro at the 2016 AFL Under 18 Championships. In their match against Vic Country, he was named as one of the best after tallying 27 disposals and kicking a goal in the two point win. He was also named as one of the best in the final match of the Championships, against Western Australia, where the victory awarded them their first Division One title since 2012. His strong performances saw him selected for the season's All-Australian team.

=== AFL ===
Brown was drafted by Collingwood with pick 35 in the 2016 national draft under the father–son rule, with Collingwood matching North Melbourne's bid. Despite the number 26 guernsey which his father wore being vacant, Brown chose to wear number 17 to create his own legacy. He started the season on the sidelines after being diagnosed with glandular fever during the 2017 season pre-season. In round 12 he made his debut for Collingwood, recording 16 disposals against Melbourne in a four-point loss.

After a 2022 AFL season in which both Brown and his brother Tyler failed to establish themselves in new coach Craig McRae's best 22, both Brown brothers were delisted at the conclusion of that season.

=== Post-AFL ===
After being delisted by Collingwood, Brown joined Box Hill for the 2023 VFL season. He also re-joined his former club, Marcellin, for the 2023 VAFA season. He was named in the 2023 VFL Team of the Year.

In 2024, Brown joined Montmorency in the Northern Football Netball League, sharing his playing duties with Box Hill.

== Personal life ==
Brown is the son of former Collingwood captain, Gavin Brown, and brother of his team-mate Tyler Brown. His sister, Tarni Brown, was selected for the 2020 AFL Women's (AFLW) academy and was drafted by Collingwood in the 2020 AFL Women's draft under the father–daughter rule.

He was educated at Marcellin College, where he played Australian rules football and basketball, and was awarded the Terrance Cleary Memorial Award for Sporting Excellence. Brown is studying for a Bachelor of Arts at Deakin University.

== Statistics ==
Statistics are correct to the end of round 22, 2022

Legend
G	Goals	K	Kicks	D	Disposals	T	Tackles
B	Behinds	H	Handballs	M	Marks

Season	Team	No.	Games	Totals							Averages (per game)						
Season	Team	No.	Games	G	B	K	H	D	M	T	G	B	K	H	D	M	T
2017	Collingwood	17	5	1	1	18	50	68	11	11	0.2	0.2	3.6	10.0	13.6	2.2	2.2
2018	Collingwood	17	8	1	1	49	76	125	13	38	0.1	0.1	6.1	9.5	15.6	1.6	4.8
2019	Collingwood	17	22	11	13	160	162	322	58	89	0.5	0.6	7.3	7.4	14.6	2.6	4.0
2020 (Note: The 2020 season was played with 17 home-and-away matches per team (down from 22) and 16-minute quarters with time on (down from 20-minute quarters with time on) due to the impact of the COVID-19 pandemic.)	Collingwood	17	14	6	2	69	109	178	24	29	0.4	0.1	4.9	7.8	12.7	1.7	2.1
2021	Collingwood	17	15	3	6	66	107	173	41	44	0.2	0.4	4.4	7.1	11.5	2.7	2.9
2022	Collingwood	17	6	1	0	22	45	67	8	19	0.2	0.0	3.7	7.5	11.2	1.3	3.2
Career			70	23	23	384	549	933	155	230	0.3	0.3	5.5	7.8	13.3	2.2	3.3
