= 2021 Collingwood Magpies (netball) season =

Australian netball club season

Collingwood Magpies Netball
- 2021 season
- Head coach: Nicole Richardson
- Captain: Geva Mentor
- Main venue: John Cain Arena
- Team colours

Collingwood Magpies Netball seasons
- ← 2020 2022 →

The 2021 Collingwood Magpies season is the club's fifth year of senior competition in the Suncorp Super Netball league.

The Magpies are coached this season by Nicole Richardson, who was promoted to the position following the departure of Rob Wright at the end of the previous season. They are captained by Geva Mentor. Collingwood enter the season off the back of a last-place finish in the 2020 season, in which they won only one of their fourteen matches.

== Player changes ==
Summary of 2021 pre-season player movements
▲ Gains	▼ Losses
Molly Jovic (elevated to senior list); Kalifa McCollin (new signing from Southern Steel); Jacqui Newton (new signing from Melbourne Vixens)	Nat Medhurst (retired); Kelly Altmann (delisted from senior squad); Madison Browne (retired from Super Netball); Kim Ravaillion (signed by Queensland Firebirds); Matilda Garrett (signed by Adelaide Thunderbirds)

== Squad ==
2021 Collingwood Magpies roster
Players
Coaching staff

Nat.	Name	Position(s)	DoB	Height
(Australia)	Melissa Bragg	GD, WD	17 December 1994	1.77 m (5 ft 10 in)
(Australia)	Ashleigh Brazill (injured)	WD, C	29 December 1989	1.75 m (5 ft 9 in)
(Australia)	Kelsey Browne	WA, C	17 January 1992	1.64 m (5 ft 5 in)
(Trinidad and Tobago)	Kalifa McCollin	GA, GS	18 July 1995	1.80 m (5 ft 11 in)
(Australia)	Molly Jovic	WA, C	7 October 1995	1.72 m (5 ft 8 in)
(Australia)	Jacqui Newton	GD, GK, WD	14 February 1997	1.85 m (6 ft 1 in)
(England)	Geva Mentor	GK	17 September 1984	1.90 m (6 ft 3 in)
(Jamaica)	Shimona Nelson	GS	1 December 1998	1.95 m (6 ft 5 in)
(Australia)	Gabrielle Sinclair	GA, GS	12 July 1993	1.76 m (5 ft 9 in)
(Jamaica)	Jodi-Ann Ward	GD, WD	1 September 1994	1.75 m (5 ft 9 in)

Head coach

- Nicole Richardson

Assistant coach

- Kate Upton

Assistant coaches

- Lauren Blackwood

Manager: Jane Woodlands-Thompson
Strength and conditioning: Chris Howley

Notes

- (c) – Captain
- (cc) – Co-captain
- (vc) – Vice-captain
- – Injury / maternity leave
- (TRP) – Temporary Replacement Player
Player profiles: Team website
Last updated: 11 November 2020

== Pre-season matches ==
Notes

- Colours: Magpies win Magpies loss Draw
- Home teams are listed left, away teams right. Times listed are local.

5 March; 5.00 pm	Report; Stats	Collingwood Magpies	75–45	New South Wales Swifts	Hobart Netball and Sports Centre	YouTube

7 March; 10.00 am	Report; Stats	Collingwood Magpies	83–42	New South Wales Swifts	Hobart Netball and Sports Centre	None

26 March; 7.00 pm	Report; Stats	Collingwood Magpies	48–51	Adelaide Thunderbirds	Gippsland Regional Indoor Sports Centre	YouTube

28 March; 11.00 am	Report; Stats	Collingwood Magpies	67–56	Queensland Firebirds	Gippsland Regional Indoor Sports Centre	None

17 April; 7.00 pm	Report; Stats	Collingwood Magpies	68–59	Giants Netball	Bendigo Stadium	None

== Super Netball season ==
=== Ladder ===
2021 Suncorp Super Netball ladder
Pos	Team	P	W	D	L	GF	GA	%	PTS
1	Giants Netball	14	9	0	5	853	797	107.03	36
2	New South Wales Swifts	14	9	0	5	853	808	105.57	36
3	West Coast Fever	14	11	0	3	976	835	116.89	32*
4	Sunshine Coast Lightning	14	8	0	6	825	834	98.92	32
5	Queensland Firebirds	14	6	0	8	880	873	100.8	24
6	Collingwood Magpies	14	6	0	8	829	882	93.99	24
7	Adelaide Thunderbirds	14	5	0	9	764	835	91.5	20
8	Melbourne Vixens	14	2	0	12	718	834	86.09	8
Last updated: 7 August 2021 — Source; *West Coast Fever were stripped 12 premiership points due to historical salary cap violations.

=== Results ===
Notes

- Colours: Magpies win Magpies loss Draw
- Home teams are listed left, away teams right.
- Times listed are Australian Eastern Standard Time (AEST).

Sat 1 May; 7.00pm	Report; Stats	Collingwood Magpies	56–67	Sunshine Coast Lightning	John Cain Arena	Telstra
Sat 1 May; 7.00pm	Report; Stats	Scoring by quarter: 16–17, 14–16, 16–21, 10–13			John Cain Arena	Telstra
Sat 1 May; 7.00pm	Report; Stats	2 Goal Shots; Sinclair 4/9 (44%); McCollin 1/1 (100%); 1 Goal Shots; Nelson 39/43 (91%); Sinclair 6/9 (67%); McCollin 1/1 (100%)		2 Goal Shots; Wood 2/3 (67%); Koenen 1/1 (100%); 1 Goal Shots; Koenen 37/42 (88%); Wood 18/21 (86%); Proscovia 6/6 (100%)	John Cain Arena	Telstra
Sat 1 May; 7.00pm	Report; Stats	Round 1			John Cain Arena	Telstra

Sat 8 May; 3.00pm	Giants Netball	v	Collingwood Magpies	Ken Rosewall Arena	Nine
Sat 8 May; 3.00pm	2 Goal Shots; 1 Goal Shots		2 Goal Shots; 1 Goal Shots	Ken Rosewall Arena	Nine
Sat 8 May; 3.00pm	Round 2			Ken Rosewall Arena	Nine

Sat 15 May; 3.00pm	Collingwood Magpies	v	Adelaide Thunderbirds	John Cain Arena	Nine
Sat 15 May; 3.00pm	2 Goal Shots; 1 Goal Shots		2 Goal Shots; 1 Goal Shots	John Cain Arena	Nine
Sat 15 May; 3.00pm	Round 3			John Cain Arena	Nine

Sat 22 May; 3.00pm	Collingwood Magpies	v	Queensland Firebirds	Silverdome	Telstra
Sat 22 May; 3.00pm	2 Goal Shots; 1 Goal Shots		2 Goal Shots; 1 Goal Shots	Silverdome	Telstra
Sat 22 May; 3.00pm	Round 4			Silverdome	Telstra

Sun 30 May; 3.00pm	New South Wales Swifts	v	Collingwood Magpies	Ken Rosewall Arena	Telstra
Sun 30 May; 3.00pm	2 Goal Shots; 1 Goal Shots		2 Goal Shots; 1 Goal Shots	Ken Rosewall Arena	Telstra
Sun 30 May; 3.00pm	Round 5			Ken Rosewall Arena	Telstra

Sat 5 Jun; 3.00pm	Collingwood Magpies	v	West Coast Fever	John Cain Arena	Nine
Sat 5 Jun; 3.00pm	2 Goal Shots; 1 Goal Shots		2 Goal Shots; 1 Goal Shots	John Cain Arena	Nine
Sat 5 Jun; 3.00pm	Round 6			John Cain Arena	Nine

Mon 14 Jun; 12.00pm	Collingwood Magpies	v	Melbourne Vixens	John Cain Arena	Nine
Mon 14 Jun; 12.00pm	2 Goal Shots; 1 Goal Shots		2 Goal Shots; 1 Goal Shots	John Cain Arena	Nine
Mon 14 Jun; 12.00pm	Round 7			John Cain Arena	Nine

Sat 26 Jun; 3.00pm	Sunshine Coast Lightning	v	Collingwood Magpies	USC Stadium	Nine
Sat 26 Jun; 3.00pm	2 Goal Shots; 1 Goal Shots		2 Goal Shots; 1 Goal Shots	USC Stadium	Nine
Sat 26 Jun; 3.00pm	Round 8			USC Stadium	Nine

Sun 4 Jul; 3.00pm	Adelaide Thunderbirds	v	Collingwood Magpies	Netball SA Stadium	Telstra
Sun 4 Jul; 3.00pm	2 Goal Shots; 1 Goal Shots		2 Goal Shots; 1 Goal Shots	Netball SA Stadium	Telstra
Sun 4 Jul; 3.00pm	Round 9			Netball SA Stadium	Telstra

Sun 11 Jul; 3.00pm	Collingwood Magpies	v	Giants Netball	John Cain Arena	Telstra
Sun 11 Jul; 3.00pm	2 Goal Shots; 1 Goal Shots		2 Goal Shots; 1 Goal Shots	John Cain Arena	Telstra
Sun 11 Jul; 3.00pm	Round 10			John Cain Arena	Telstra

Sat 17 Jul; 3.00pm	Queensland Firebirds	v	Collingwood Magpies	Nissan Arena	Nine
Sat 17 Jul; 3.00pm	2 Goal Shots; 1 Goal Shots		2 Goal Shots; 1 Goal Shots	Nissan Arena	Nine
Sat 17 Jul; 3.00pm	Round 11			Nissan Arena	Nine

Sat 24 Jul; 8.00pm	West Coast Fever	v	Collingwood Magpies	RAC Arena	Telstra
Sat 24 Jul; 8.00pm	2 Goal Shots; 1 Goal Shots		2 Goal Shots; 1 Goal Shots	RAC Arena	Telstra
Sat 24 Jul; 8.00pm	Round 12			RAC Arena	Telstra

Sat 31 Jul; 3.00pm	Collingwood Magpies	v	New South Wales Swifts	Silverdome	Nine
Sat 31 Jul; 3.00pm	2 Goal Shots; 1 Goal Shots		2 Goal Shots; 1 Goal Shots	Silverdome	Nine
Sat 31 Jul; 3.00pm	Round 13			Silverdome	Nine

Sun 8 Aug; 1.00pm	Melbourne Vixens	v	Collingwood Magpies	John Cain Arena	Nine
Sun 8 Aug; 1.00pm	2 Goal Shots; 1 Goal Shots		2 Goal Shots; 1 Goal Shots	John Cain Arena	Nine
Sun 8 Aug; 1.00pm	Round 14			John Cain Arena	Nine

== See also ==
- 2021 Suncorp Super Netball season
- 2021 Collingwood Football Club season
