= Caleb Poulter =

Australian rules footballer (born 2002)

Personal information
- Full name: Caleb Poulter
- Born: 12 October 2002 (age 24); Ardrossan, South Australia
- Original team: Woodville-West Torrens (SANFL)
- Draft: No. 30, 2020 national draft
- Debut: Round 7, 2021, Collingwood vs. Gold Coast, at MCG
- Height: 193 cm (6 ft 4 in)
- Weight: 80 kg (176 lb)
- Position: Midfielder

Playing career
Years	Club	Games (Goals)
2021–2022	Collingwood	12 (2)
2023–2025	Western Bulldogs	23 (8)
Total		35 (10)

Caleb Poulter (born 12 October 2002) is a former professional Australian rules footballer who played for the Western Bulldogs and Collingwood in the Australian Football League (AFL).

== Early life and state football ==
Poulter is from the town Ardrossan on the Yorke Peninsula. He played junior football for Ardrossan Kangaroos. Poulter played with Woodville-West Torrens in the South Australian National Football League (SANFL). In 2018, he played 7 matches with the under-16 team, kicking one goal and averaging 15.9 disposals. The following year, he played 13 matches with the under-18 team, kicking 11 goals and averaging 17.2 disposals. Poulter started 2020, by being nominated for the Torrens University Cup Most Valuable Player (MVP) award, following his 34 disposals in the 1st round. In October 2020, Poulter excelled at the AFL Draft Combine. Later that month, he played in the annual South Australian Under 18 All-Stars fixture at Thebarton Oval and was described as the best and most classy player afield.

== AFL career ==
=== Collingwood (2021-2022) ===
Poulter was drafted by Collingwood with their fourth pick of the 2020 national draft, which was the 30th pick overall. Following a Victorian Football League (VFL) match against Essendon in which he collected 27 disposals, Poulter made his AFL debut against the Gold Coast in the seventh round of the 2021 AFL season, at the MCG. In October 2022, following the trade period, Poulter was delisted by Collingwood.

=== Western Bulldogs (2023-2025) ===
In a bid to get relisted, Poulter was signed by Western Bulldogs VFL side, Footscray. He played well enough to be drafted at Pick 10 by the Western Bulldogs in the 2023 AFL mid-season draft. At the completion of the 2023 season Poulter was awarded with a contract extension until the 2025 season.

Poulter was delisted by the Bulldogs at the end of the 2025 AFL season, after 23 matches over two and a half seasons at the club.

== Statistics ==
Legend
G	Goals	K	Kicks	D	Disposals	T	Tackles
B	Behinds	H	Handballs	M	Marks

Season	Team	No.	Games	Totals							Averages (per game)							Votes
Season	Team	No.	Games	G	B	K	H	D	M	T	G	B	K	H	D	M	T	Votes
2021	Collingwood	27	11	2	5	107	58	165	55	22	0.2	0.5	9.7	5.3	15.0	5.0	2.0	0
2022	Collingwood	24	1	0	0	10	3	13	2	4	0.0	0.0	10.0	3.0	13.0	2.0	4.0	0
2023	Western Bulldogs	25	9	3	1	68	65	133	24	24	0.3	0.1	7.6	7.2	14.8	2.7	2.7	0
2024	Western Bulldogs	25	7	3	3	69	32	101	27	17	0.4	0.4	9.9	4.6	14.4	3.9	2.4	0
2025	Western Bulldogs	25	7	2	2	39	27	66	26	13	0.3	0.3	5.6	3.9	9.4	3.7	1.9	0
Career			35	10	11	293	185	478	134	80	0.3	0.3	8.4	5.3	13.7	3.8	2.3	0
