= Steph Chiocci =

Australian rules footballer (born 1988)

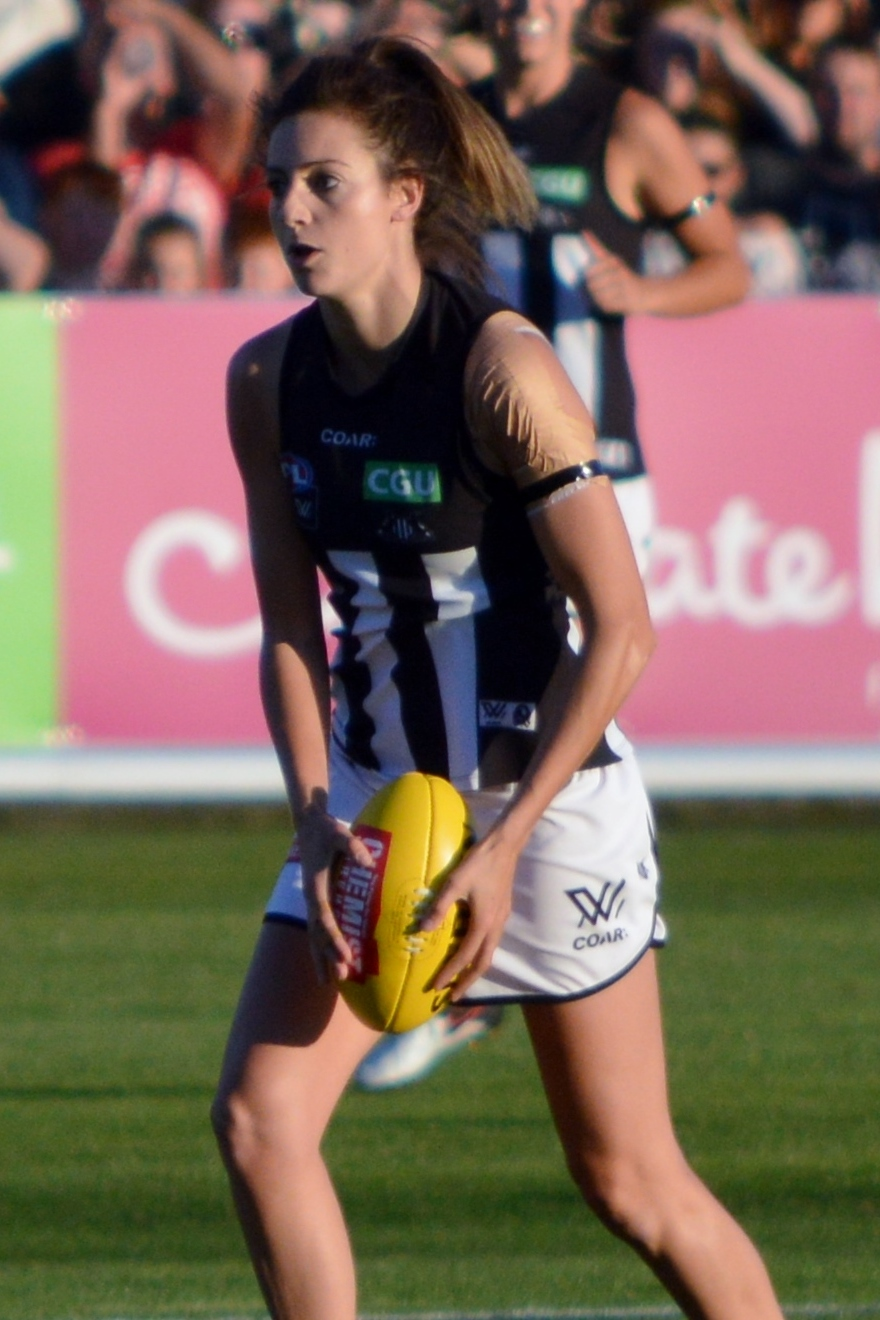
- Chiocci playing for Collingwood in 2017

Personal information
- Full name: Stephanie Chiocci
- Born: 6 December 1988 (age 37); Carlton, Victoria
- Original team: Diamond Creek (VFLW)
- Draft: No. 11, 2016 national draft
- Debut: Round 1, 2017, Collingwood vs. Carlton, at Ikon Park
- Height: 170 cm (5 ft 7 in)
- Position: Midfielder / defender

Playing career^{1}
Years	Club	Games (Goals)
2017–2022 (S7)	Collingwood	55 (8)
2023–2024	St Kilda	6 (0)
Total		61 (8)

Representative team honours^{2}
Years	Team	Games (Goals)
2017	Victoria	1 (0)
- ^{1} Playing statistics correct to the end of the 2023 season.^{2} Representative statistics correct as of 2017.

Career highlights
- Collingwood captain: 2017–2022 (S7) (co-captain 2021–2022 (S7))

Stephanie Chiocci (Italian pronunciation: [ˈkjɔttʃi]; born 6 December 1988) is a former Australian rules footballer who played for the St Kilda Football Club and Collingwood Football Club in the AFL Women's (AFLW). Chiocci served as Collingwood captain for the duration of her Collingwood career from 2017 to 2022 (S7), including as co-captain alongside Brianna Davey from 2021 to 2022 season 7, following which she moved to St Kilda.

== Early life ==
Chiocci grew up in Eltham, a suburb in Melbourne's north-east, and is of Italian descent. She attended high school at Catholic Ladies' College in Eltham.

== Early football career ==
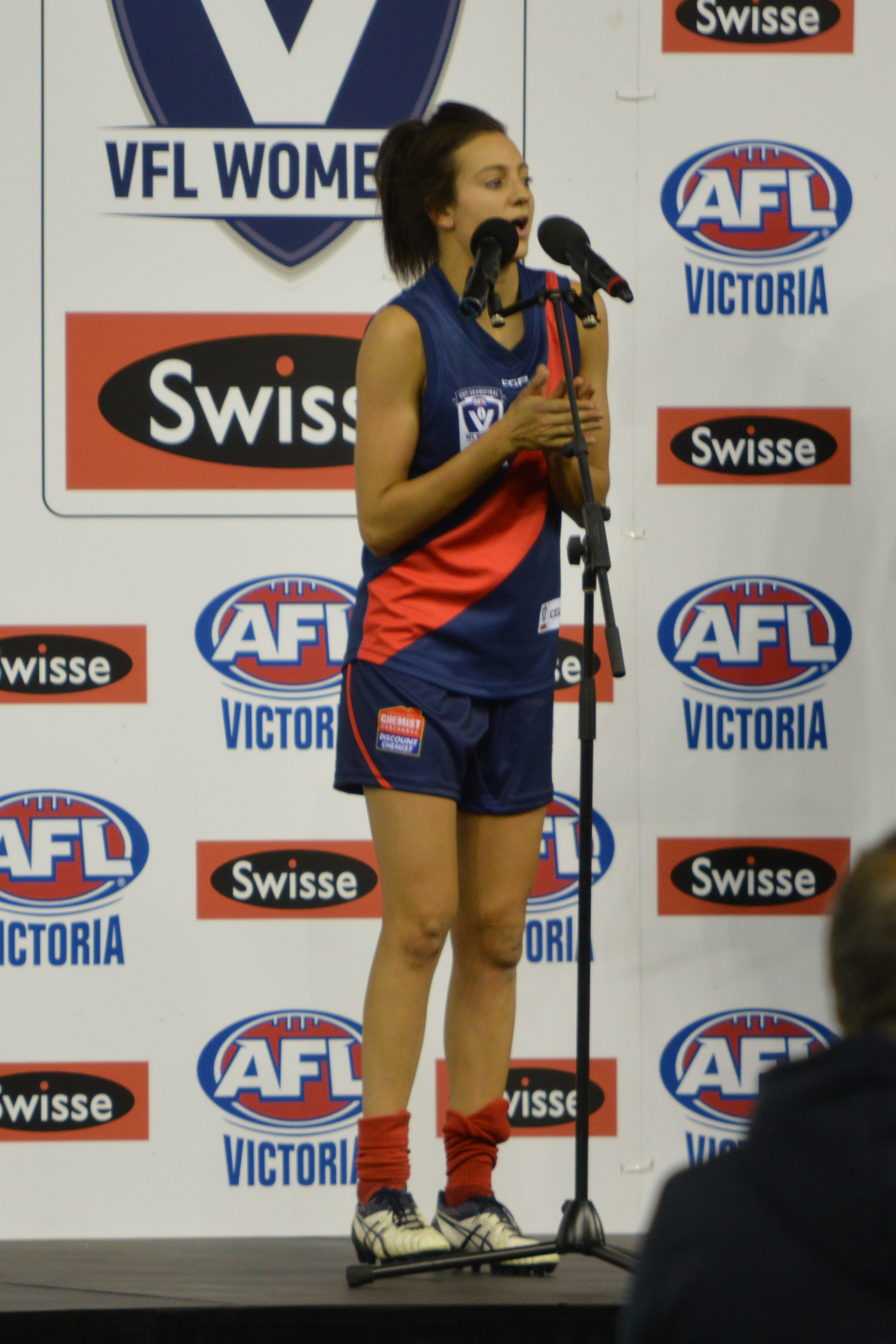
Chiocci following the 2017 VFLW Grand Final

=== State league career ===
Chiocci played state league football for Diamond Creek in the Victorian Women's Football League (VWFL) and VFL Women's (VFLW) from 2006 to 2017. She was a member of the Creekers North East division premiership team in 2006 and won the club's best and fairest award that same season. That season, she also received the league's best first-year player award. She repeated the result in 2012, with a second premiership and second club best and fairest. She kicked three goals in the winning grand final. Chiocci placed second in the league's best and fairest award at the conclusion of the 2009 season. She captained the club from 2014 to 2017.

=== Representative football ===
Chiocci is a three-time senior All-Australian, winning the honours in consecutive AFL Women's National Championships in 2009, 2011 and 2013. In 2010, Chiocci was one of 40 players to participate in the women's AFL high-performance camp. As part of the program, she played in a curtain-raiser exhibition match ahead of the round 12, 2010 AFL match between Melbourne and Collingwood.

Chiocci was selected by the Western Bulldogs with the club's first selection and number two overall in the 2013 women's AFL exhibition game draft. She later played in the first women's exhibition match in June 2013. She was retained by the club and played in exhibition matches in each year through to the end of 2016. She captained the side in 2015 and 2016 including in the women's all-star match in September 2016.

Chiocci participated in AFL Victoria's female academy in 2015 and 2016, a program intending to lift the performances of some of the state's best female footballers.

== AFL Women's career ==
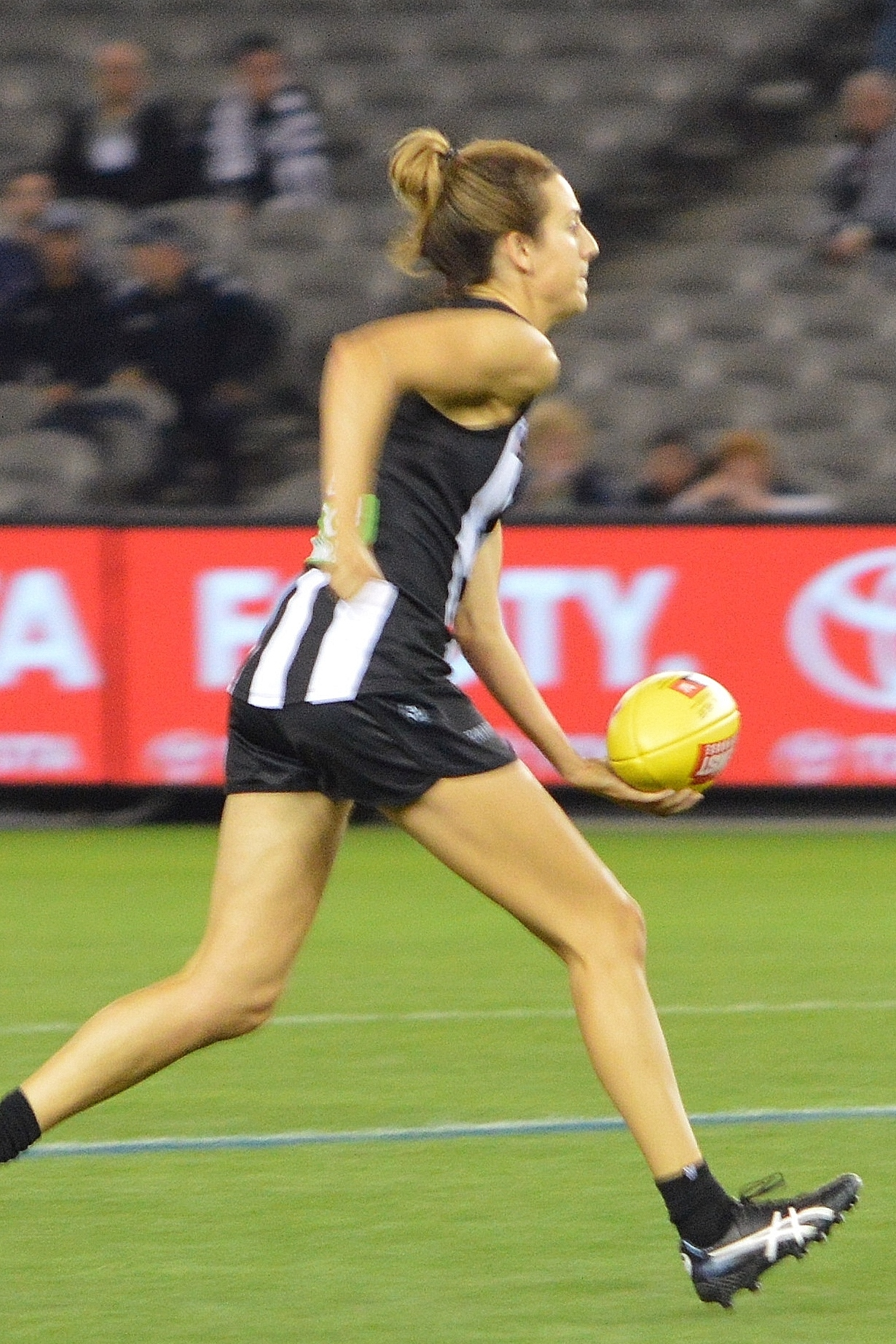
Chiocci playing in 2020

Chiocci was drafted by Collingwood with the club's second selection and eleventh overall in the 2016 AFL Women's draft. She was named the club's inaugural AFL Women's captain in January 2017. Chiocci played in all seven games of the 2017 season.

In May 2017, Collingwood signed her for the 2018 season. She played in the first five matches of the season, before she was suspended for making forceful head-high contact with Western Bulldogs defender Libby Birch in round 5. She was suspended for two matches, ending her season after playing five matches. In May 2018, Chiocci was re-signed by Collingwood for the 2019 season.

Collingwood signed Chiocci for the 2020 season during the trade and sign period in April 2019.

In December 2020, it was announced that Chiocci would captain Collingwood for a fifth consecutive season in 2021, and that vice-captain and former Carlton captain Brianna Davey would join her as co-captain.

After playing in the opening round of the 2022 season, Chiocci was a late withdrawal from Collingwood's win over St Kilda with an Achilles injury, returning in round 4 against Fremantle. She was left out again in round 6 to manage the same injury, and returned in round 8 against the Western Bulldogs.

== Statistics ==
Updated to the end of 2022 (S7).

Legend
G	Goals	K	Kicks	D	Disposals	T	Tackles
B	Behinds	H	Handballs	M	Marks

Season	Team	No.	Games	Totals							Averages (per game)							Votes
Season	Team	No.	Games	G	B	K	H	D	M	T	G	B	K	H	D	M	T	Votes
2017	Collingwood	17	7	1	2	50	18	68	9	21	0.1	0.3	7.1	2.6	9.7	1.3	3.0	5
2018	Collingwood	17	5	2	1	42	28	70	7	21	0.4	0.2	8.4	5.6	14.0	1.4	4.2	3
2019	Collingwood	17	7	1	3	51	22	73	20	21	0.1	0.4	7.3	3.1	10.4	2.9	3.0	3
2020	Collingwood	17	7	1	0	59	50	109	25	22	0.1	0.0	8.4	7.1	15.6	3.6	3.1	3
2021	Collingwood	17	11	0	3	79	67	146	32	36	0.0	0.3	7.2	6.1	13.3	2.9	3.3	0
2022 (S6)	Collingwood	17	7	1	2	46	45	91	18	19	0.1	0.3	6.6	6.4	13.0	2.6	2.7	0
2022 (S7)	Collingwood	17	11	2	3	76	41	117	25	29	0.2	0.3	6.9	3.7	10.6	2.3	2.6	1
Career			55	8	14	403	271	674	136	169	0.1	0.3	7.3	4.9	12.3	2.5	3.1	15

== Personal life ==
Off-field, Chiocci works as a teacher at Parkdale Secondary College in Melbourne's south-east.

== Honours and achievements ==
- Collingwood captain: 2017–2022 (S7) (co-captain 2021–2022 (S7))
- Victoria representative honours in AFL Women's State of Origin: 2017
