= 2021 VFL Women's season =

- Teams: 12
- Premiers: Not awarded
- Minor premiers: Collingwood; 3rd minor premiership
- Best and fairest: Georgia Nanscawen (Essendon − 17 votes
- Leading goalkicker: Imogen Barnett (Collingwood − 20 goals)
- Matches played: 90

The 2021 VFL Women's season was the fifth season of the VFL Women's (VFLW). The season commenced on 27 February and was eventually curtailed on 10 September 2021 by the COVID-19 pandemic in Victoria, causing the grand final to be cancelled and no premiership awarded. Collingwood were recognised as the minor premiers for their undefeated regular season.

Prior to the start of the season, the Coburg Football Club formed a women's team with a plan to join the VFLW in 2021. However, the plan did not eventuate.

== Clubs ==
- Carlton, Casey, Collingwood, Darebin, Essendon, Geelong Cats, Hawthorn
- North Melbourne, Port Melbourne, Southern Saints, Western Bulldogs, Williamstown

== Ladder ==
Pos	Team	Pld	W	L	D	PF	PA	PP	Pts	Qualification
1	Collingwood	14	14	0	0	704	237	297.0	56	Finals series
2	Geelong Cats	14	10	4	0	570	327	174.3	40	Finals series
3	Port Melbourne	14	10	4	0	597	463	128.9	40	Finals series
4	Casey	14	8	6	0	641	410	156.3	32	Finals series
5	Essendon	14	8	6	0	523	336	155.7	32	Finals series
6	Southern Saints	14	7	7	0	508	441	115.2	28	Finals series
7	Western Bulldogs	14	7	7	0	424	559	75.8	28	
8	Carlton	14	6	8	0	437	548	79.7	24	
9	Hawthorn	14	5	9	0	500	531	94.2	20	
10	North Melbourne	14	5	9	0	390	619	63.0	20	
11	Williamstown	14	2	11	1	242	545	44.4	10	
12	Darebin	14	1	12	1	235	755	31.1	6	

Source: SportsTGAustralian Football
Rules for classification: 1) points; 2) percentage; 3) number of points for.

== Finals series ==
Match-ups set using the second McIntyre final six system.

=== Elimination and Qualifying finals ===
	Elimination finals
Saturday, 3 July (12:00 pm)	Casey 5.2 (32)	def. by	Essendon 5.5 (35)	Casey Fields	Report
Sunday, 4 July (2:00 pm)	Port Melbourne 3.5 (23)	def. by	Southern Saints 7.15 (57)	ETU Stadium	Report

	Qualifying final
Saturday, 3 July (12:00 pm)	Collingwood 4.2 (26)	def.	Geelong Cats 2.8 (20)	Holden Centre	Report

=== Semi finals ===
	Semi finals
Saturday, 10 July (12:00 pm)	Collingwood 2.6 (18)	def.	Essendon 1.5 (11)	Victoria Park	Report
Saturday, 10 July (2:00 pm)	Geelong Cats 6.4 (40)	def.	Southern Saints 5.3 (33)	GMHBA Stadium	Report

=== Preliminary final ===
	Preliminary final
Saturday, 31 July (12:00 pm)	Essendon 2.5 (17)	def. by	Geelong Cats 6.9 (45)	Windy Hill	Report
Match originally scheduled for 17 July 2021, but was postponed due to a COVID-19 outbreak causing a lockdown in Victoria from 16 July 2021.; Match played behind closed doors.

=== Grand Final ===
2021 VFLW Grand Final (cancelled)
Collingwood	v	Geelong Cats
Q1; Q2; Q3; Final
Match originally scheduled for 25 July 2021, but was originally postponed to 8 August due to a COVID-19 outbreak causing a lockdown in Victoria from 16 July 2021.; The Grand Final was further postponed with the lockdown extended into September.; On 10 September 2021 the AFL cancelled the VFLW Grand Final and advised no premiership would be awarded for the 2021 season.

== Awards ==
- Lambert-Pearce Medal (Best and Fairest): Georgia Nanscawen (Essendon) – 17 votes
- Rohenna Young Medal (Leading Goal kicker): Imogen Barnett (Collingwood) – 20 goals
- Debbie Lee Medal (Rising Star): Eliza West (Casey)
- Coach of the Year: Chloe McMillan (Collingwood)
- Lisa Hardeman Medal (Best on ground VFL Women's Grand Final): Not awarded

2021 VFL Women's Team of the Year
B:	Victoria Blackwood (Darebin)	Jasmine Ferguson (Collingwood)	
HB:	Molly Eastman (North Melbourne)	Lucy Burke (Southern Saints)	Alice Burke (Southern Saints)
C:	Airlie Runnalls (North Melbourne)	Georgia Nanscawen (Essendon) (c)	Laura Gardiner (Geelong Cats)
HF:	Sophie Locke (Port Melbourne)	Tara Bohanna (Southern Saints)	Alana Barba (Essendon)
F:	Imogen Milford (Casey)	Imogen Barnett (Collingwood)	
Foll:	Olivia Fuller (Geelong Cats)	Eliza West (Casey)	Megan Kiely (North Melbourne)
Int:	Aimee Whelan (Williamstown)	Claudia Gunjaca (Geelong Cats)	Caitlin Bunker (Collingwood)
Int:	Jorja Borg (Carlton)	Matila Zander (Collingwood)	
Coach:	Chloe McMillan (Collingwood)		

=== Club best and fairest winners ===
Club	Best & Fairest	Ref
Carlton	Akayla Peterson	
Casey	Eliza West	
Collingwood	Imogen Barnett	
Darebin	Nicole Callinan	
Essendon	Eloise Ashley-Cooper	
Geelong Cats	Claudia Gunjaca	
Hawthorn	Tamara Luke	
North Melbourne	Meagan Kiely	
Port Melbourne	Claire Dyett	
Southern Saints	Tara Bohanna	
Western Bulldogs	Simone Ruedin	
Williamstown	Ruby Tripodi	

== See also ==
- 2021 VFL season
