= Darcy Moore =

Australian rules footballer (born 1996)

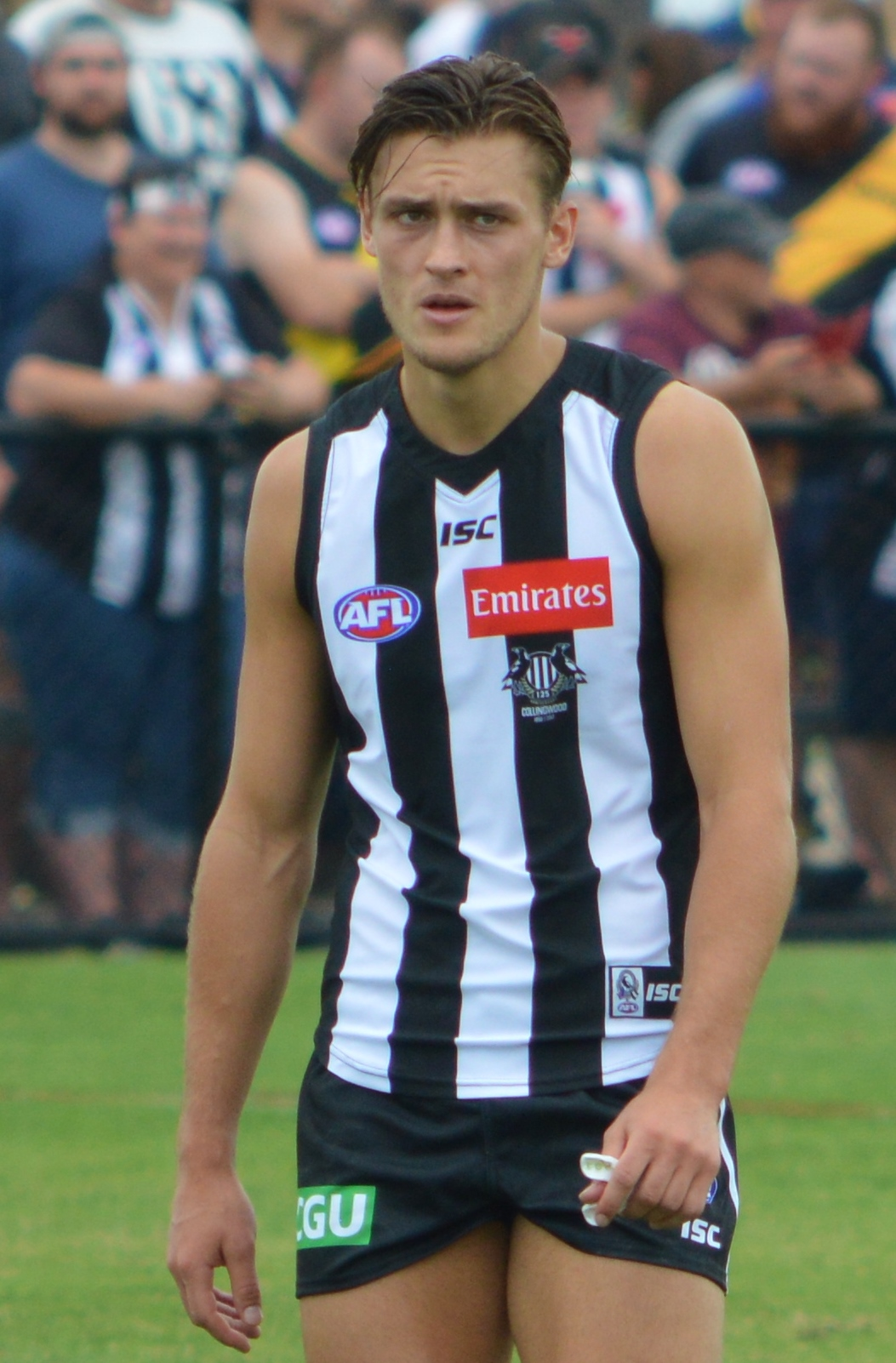
- Moore playing for Collingwood in March 2017

Personal information
- Full name: Darcy Moore
- Born: 25 January 1996 (age 30); Australia
- Original team: Oakleigh Chargers (TAC Cup)
- Draft: No. 9 (F/S), 2014 national draft
- Height: 203 cm (6 ft 8 in)
- Weight: 100 kg (220 lb)
- Position: Key defender

Club information
- Current club: Collingwood
- Number: 30

Playing career^{1}
| Years | Club | Games (Goals) |
| 2015– | Collingwood | 199 (67) |

Representative team honours
| Years | Team | Games (Goals) |
| 2020 | Victoria | 1 (0) |
- ^{1} Playing statistics correct to the end of the 2026 season.

Career highlights
- Collingwood captain: 2023–; AFL premiership captain: 2023; 2× All-Australian team: 2020, 2023; 22under22 team: 2016; AFL Rising Star nominee: 2016; Bob Rose Award: 2022

Darcy Moore (born 25 January 1996) is an Australian rules footballer who currently plays for the Collingwood Football Club. The son of former Collingwood captain Peter Moore, he played for the Oakleigh Chargers in the TAC Cup before he was drafted to Collingwood in 2014 under the father–son rule. Moore has served as Collingwood captain since 2023.

== Early life and state football ==
Moore participated in the Auskick program at Ivanhoe. He played junior football at the Ivanhoe Junior Football Club and Kew Comets, in the Yarra Junior Football League. In 2012, he had an injury-interrupted season, managing to play only six games. Moore was co-captain of his school, Carey Baptist Grammar School in 2013.

Moore captained Oakleigh Chargers in the 2014 TAC Cup season, leading them to claim a premiership.

Growing up he split his time between the Melbourne suburbs of Alphington and Richmond, after his parents separated.

== AFL career ==
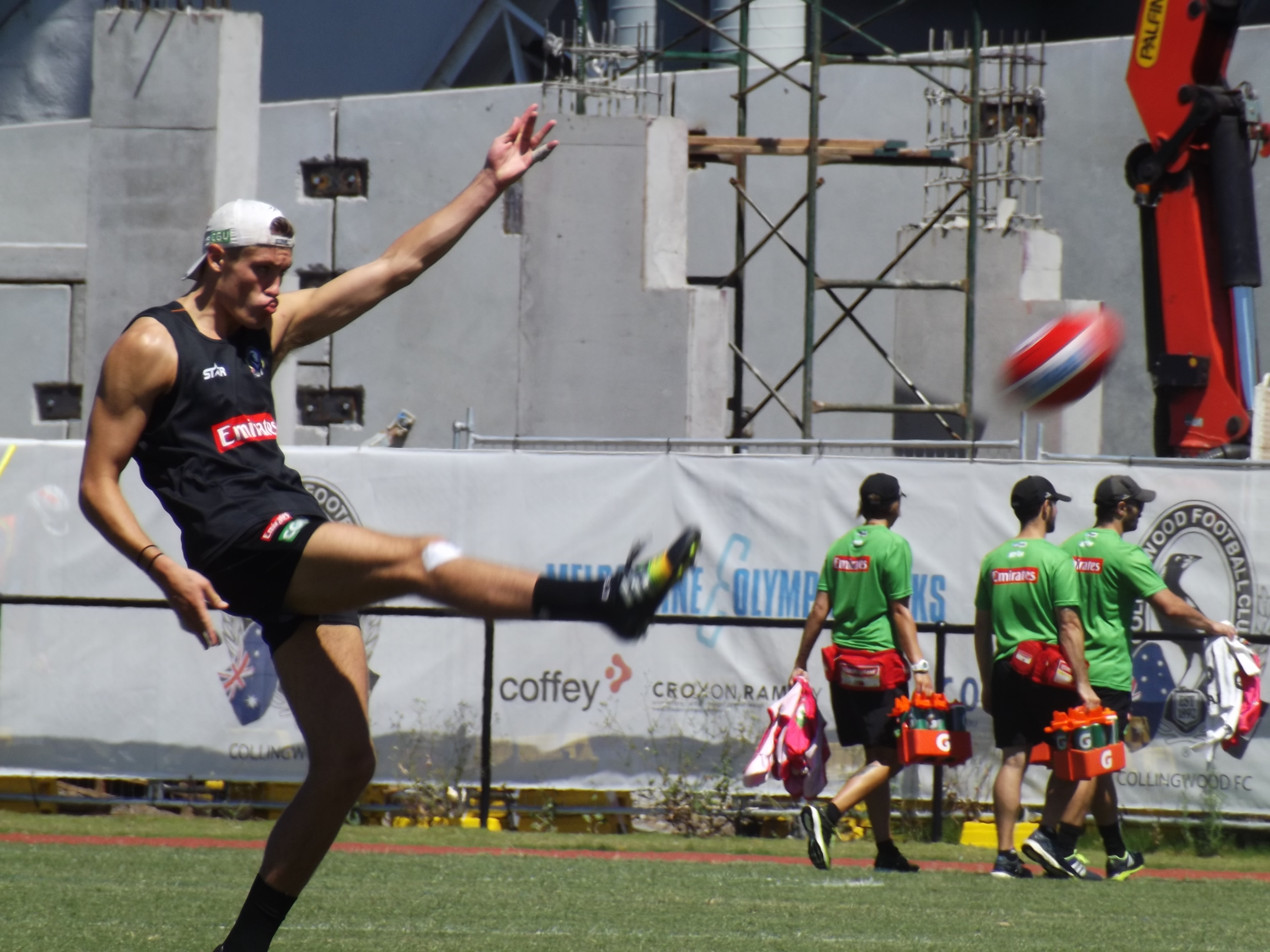
Moore training with Collingwood in 2014

Moore was drafted by Collingwood with pick number 9 in the 2014 AFL draft under the father–son rule, with Collingwood matching the first round bid made by the Western Bulldogs. He received the number 30 guernsey to wear, which is the same number his father Peter Moore wore while playing for the club. In May 2015, before making a senior appearance, Moore signed a two-year contract extension on top of the standard two-year contract presented to draftees, keeping him at the club until the end of 2018. Moore made his AFL debut at the Melbourne Cricket Ground against Hawthorn in round 14 of the 2015 season. His first goal came against the Western Bulldogs in Round 17, where he kicked five goals straight in his team's 18-point loss. In Round 19 of the 2016 season against West Coast, Moore kicked three goals in the first half and won a Rising Star nomination after playing only 34 percent of the game. At the end of the season, he was named to AFL Players Association's 22 Under 22 team. In the 2017 season, Moore kicked 25 goals in his first 20 games of the season, leading to him being named in the initial 2017 22 Under 22 40-player squad. Due to hamstring injuries, Moore managed to play only seven games in the 2018 season. At the end of the season, he signed a two-year contract extension, after a long negotiation and amidst speculation he would join another club, such as Sydney. Former Melbourne captain Garry Lyon and former North Melbourne captain Wayne Carey praised Moore, saying he is looming as a generational type player and is the type of player who draws crowds. In February 2020, Moore was selected to play for Victoria in the State of Origin for Bushfire Relief Match, following in his father's footsteps who represented Victoria in 1984. Similar to club level, he wore the number 30 guernsey, like his father. In February 2023, Moore was appointed Collingwood captain, like his father was before him.

== Playing style ==
Moore plays as a key defender or as a tall forward. He has been praised on his closing speed, natural leap, marking ability over his head and intelligence around goal. As a forward he is able to kick goals and take marks, while as a defender he is able to shut-out players.

== Personal life ==
As the son of former Collingwood captain and dual Brownlow Medalist Peter Moore, Moore grew up supporting Collingwood.

He completed commerce studies , and is currently completing a Masters of International Relations, both at the University of Melbourne.

== Statistics ==
Updated to the end of round 22, 2026.

Legend
| G | Goals | K | Kicks | D | Disposals | T | Tackles |
| B | Behinds | H | Handballs | M | Marks |
| # | Played in that season's premiership team |

| Season | Team | No. | Games | Totals | | | | | | | Averages (per game) | | | | | | | Votes |
| Season | Team | No. | Games | G | B | K | H | D | M | T | G | B | K | H | D | M | T | Votes |
|---|---|---|---|---|---|---|---|---|---|---|---|---|---|---|---|---|---|---|
| 2015 | Collingwood | 30 | 9 | 9 | 3 | 49 | 32 | 81 | 29 | 16 | 1.0 | 0.3 | 5.4 | 3.6 | 9.0 | 3.2 | 1.8 | 0 |
| 2016 | Collingwood | 30 | 17 | 24 | 14 | 95 | 59 | 154 | 77 | 29 | 1.4 | 0.8 | 5.6 | 3.5 | 9.1 | 4.5 | 1.7 | 0 |
| 2017 | Collingwood | 30 | 21 | 25 | 19 | 152 | 68 | 220 | 125 | 40 | 1.2 | 0.9 | 7.2 | 3.2 | 10.5 | 6.0 | 1.9 | 0 |
| 2018 | Collingwood | 30 | 7 | 3 | 0 | 37 | 24 | 61 | 29 | 8 | 0.4 | 0.0 | 5.3 | 3.4 | 8.7 | 4.1 | 1.1 | 0 |
| 2019 | Collingwood | 30 | 17 | 0 | 1 | 159 | 93 | 252 | 79 | 26 | 0.0 | 0.1 | 9.4 | 5.5 | 14.8 | 4.6 | 1.5 | 1 |
| 2020 (Note: The 2020 season was played with 17 home-and-away matches per team (down from 22) and 16-minute quarters with time on (down from 20-minute quarters with time on) due to the impact of the COVID-19 pandemic.) | Collingwood | 30 | 18 | 0 | 0 | 146 | 92 | 238 | 87 | 14 | 0.0 | 0.0 | 8.1 | 5.1 | 13.2 | 4.8 | 0.8 | 6 |
| 2021 | Collingwood | 30 | 13 | 4 | 1 | 153 | 68 | 221 | 107 | 12 | 0.3 | 0.1 | 11.8 | 5.2 | 17.0 | 8.2 | 0.9 | 2 |
| 2022 | Collingwood | 30 | 24 | 2 | 0 | 235 | 114 | 349 | 133 | 27 | 0.1 | 0.0 | 9.8 | 4.8 | 14.5 | 5.5 | 1.1 | 0 |
| 2023^{#} | Collingwood | 30 | 24 | 0 | 1 | 253 | 121 | 374 | 137 | 22 | 0.0 | 0.0 | 10.5 | 5.0 | 15.6 | 5.7 | 0.9 | 3 |
| 2024 | Collingwood | 30 | 23 | 0 | 0 | 169 | 121 | 290 | 94 | 31 | 0.0 | 0.0 | 7.3 | 5.3 | 12.6 | 4.1 | 1.3 | 0 |
| 2025 | Collingwood | 30 | 22 | 0 | 1 | 119 | 115 | 234 | 99 | 39 | 0.0 | 0.0 | 5.4 | 5.2 | 10.6 | 4.5 | 1.8 | 3 |
| 2026 | Collingwood | 30 | 4 | 0 | 0 | 15 | 10 | 25 | 12 | 3 | 0.0 | 0.0 | 3.8 | 2.5 | 6.3 | 3.0 | 0.8 | 0 |
| Career | | | 199 | 67 | 40 | 1582 | 917 | 2499 | 1008 | 267 | 0.3 | 0.2 | 7.9 | 4.6 | 12.6 | 5.1 | 1.3 | 15 |

== Honours and achievements ==
Team

- AFL premiership captain (Collingwood): 2023
- AFL minor premiership (Collingwood): 2023

Individual

- 2× All-Australian team: 2020, 2023
- Bob Rose Award (Collingwood Player of the Finals): 2022
- Victorian Representative Honours in Bushfire Relief Match: 2020
- 22under22 team: 2016
- AFL Rising Star nominee: 2016 (round 19)
