= Trent Bianco =

Australian rules footballer (born 2001)

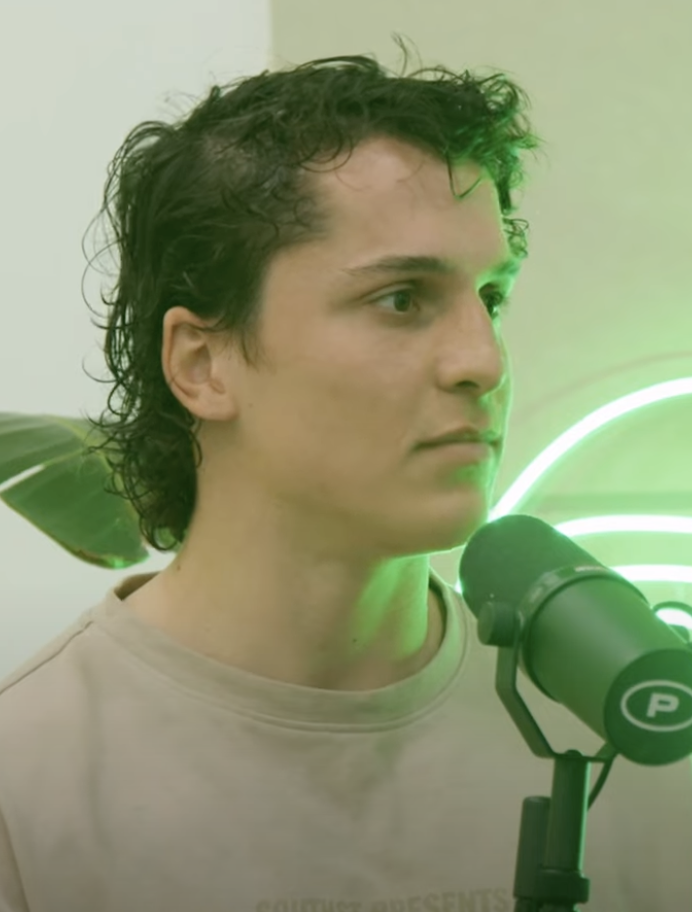
- Bianco in 2022

Personal information
- Full name: Trent Bianco
- Born: 20 January 2001 (age 25); Melbourne, Victoria
- Original team: Oakleigh Chargers (NAB League)
- Draft: No. 45, 2019 national draft
- Debut: Round 11, 2021, Collingwood vs. Geelong, at MCG
- Height: 181 cm (5 ft 11 in)
- Weight: 73 kg (161 lb)
- Position: Midfielder

Playing career^{1}
Years	Club	Games (Goals)
2020–2023	Collingwood	23 (8)
- ^{1} Playing statistics correct to the end of the 2023 season.

Career highlights
- VFL premiership player: 2026

Trent Bianco (born 20 January 2001) is an Australian rules footballer who played for the Collingwood Football Club in the Australian Football League (AFL).

== Early life and state football ==
Bianco grew up in the Melbourne suburb Doncaster and attended Marcellin College. He played football at the school and was part of the 2017 Associated Grammar Schools of Victoria (AGSV) premiership team, when they beat Ivanhoe Grammar School by 26 points in the grand final.

In 2009, Bianco started playing junior football for Doncaster in the Yarra Junior Football League (YJFL). He made 150 appearances with them, winning the best and fairest awards with the under-11s and under-12s, as well as a premiership in 2016.

Bianco played for and co-captained the Oakleigh Chargers in the NAB League, being one of the first to arrive at training to set an example. He helped lead the club to a premiership in the 2019 season, averaging 27 disposals a game. In April 2019, Bianco represented a team of Australian Under 18s who beat Casey Demons with Bianco standing out as a rebounding defender, collecting 15 disposals.

Several months later, he represented Vic Metro at the 2019 AFL Under 18 Championships, scoring one goal in the opening defeat to West Australia and being named one of the best on the ground in the one point victory over South Australia. Playing in the half-back position, he was ranked equal third general defender, having averaged 18.5 disposals and 3.5 tackles. During the summer of 2019, as part of the AFL Academy Program, Bianco trained with Australian Football League (AFL) club Collingwood, who would later manage to draft him despite their lack of draft picks.

== AFL career ==
Bianco was drafted by Collingwood with their second pick of the 2019 national draft, which was the 45th pick overall. Proceeding the 2021 season Bianco received the number 8 Guernsey from the retiring Tom Langdon. He had a knee injury at the beginning of the 2021 season, but then in two appearances for Collingwood's Victorian Football League (VFL) side he averaged 26 disposals and led the tackle count for the team. He made his senior debut for Collingwood in the eleventh round of the season against Geelong at the MCG.

At the end of the 2023 AFL season, Bianco was delisted by Collingwood, having made only one appearance during the season. After spending a year with the Footscray VFL side, Bianco turned out to play with Box Hill in 2025. Bianco was a part of the Box Hill team that defeated Geelong to win the VFL premiership in 2026.

== Personal life ==
Bianco is a life-long Collingwood supporter. Before being drafted, he worked as a waiter at his family-owned Lazy Moe’s restaurant in Oakleigh.

== Statistics ==
Updated to the end of the 2023 season.

Legend
G	Goals	K	Kicks	D	Disposals	T	Tackles
B	Behinds	H	Handballs	M	Marks

Season	Team	No.	Games	Totals							Averages (per game)						
Season	Team	No.	Games	G	B	K	H	D	M	T	G	B	K	H	D	M	T
2020	Collingwood	34	0	–	–	–	–	–	–	–	–	–	–	–	–	–	–
2021	Collingwood	8	12	7	5	100	47	147	53	21	0.6	0.4	8.3	3.9	12.3	4.4	1.8
2022	Collingwood	8	10	1	1	62	38	100	30	27	0.1	0.1	6.2	3.8	10.0	3.0	2.7
2023	Collingwood	8	1	0	0	7	2	9	3	0	0.0	0.0	7.0	2.0	9.0	3.0	0.0
Career			23	8	6	169	87	256	86	48	0.3	0.3	7.3	3.8	11.1	3.7	2.1
