= Brianna Davey =

Australian rules footballer (born 1995)

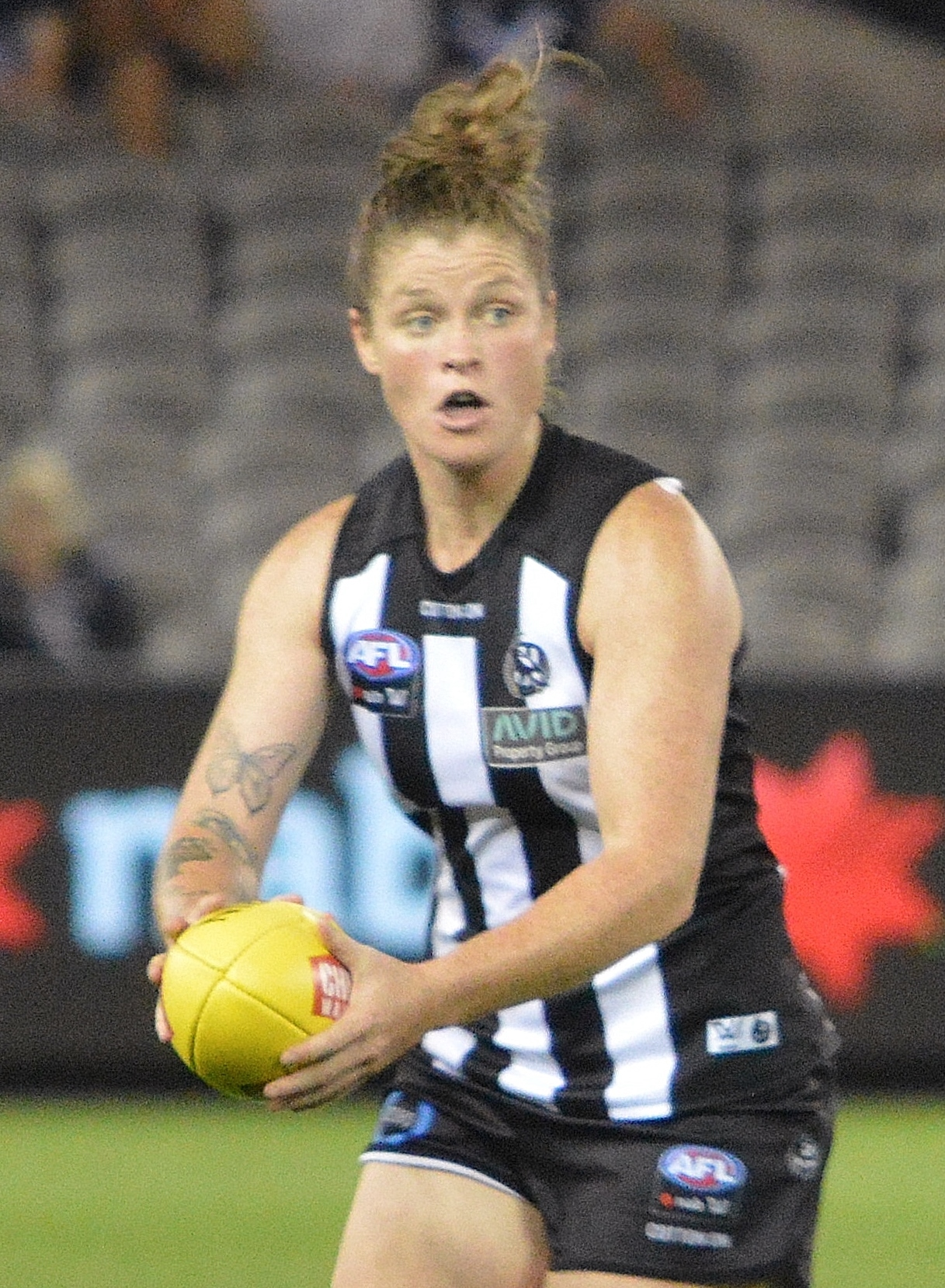
- Davey playing Australian rules football for Collingwood in 2020
- Born: 13 January 1995 (age 31); Melbourne, Victoria, Australia
- Height: 1.75 m (5 ft 9 in)
Australian rules football career
Personal information
- Original team: St Kilda Sharks (VFLW)
- Draft: 2016 marquee signing
- Debut: Round 1, 2017, Carlton vs. Collingwood, at Ikon Park
- Position: Midfielder / defender
Club information
- Current club: Collingwood
- Number: 3
Playing career^{1}
Years	Club	Games (Goals)
2017–2019	Carlton	17 (3)
2020–	Collingwood	41 (13)
Total		58 (16)
Representative team honours^{2}
Years	Team	Games (Goals)
2017	Victoria	1 (0)
- ^{1} Playing statistics correct to the end of round 10, 2026.^{2} Representative statistics correct as of 2017.
Career highlights
- AFLW: AFL Women's best and fairest: 2021; Collingwood best and fairest: 2021; Carlton captain: 2018–2019; Collingwood captain: 2021–2024; 2× AFL Women's All-Australian team: 2017, 2021; 2× Carlton best and fairest: 2017, 2019; AFLPA MVP: 2021
Association football career
- Position: Goalkeeper
Senior career*
Years	Team	Apps	(Gls)
2010–2015	Melbourne Victory	47	(0)
2013	→ Linköping FC (loan)	5	(0)
2015–2016	Melbourne City	7	(0)
International career^{‡}
2012–2015	Australia	17	(0)
- * Club domestic league appearances and goals as of 29 July 2016 ‡ National team caps and goals as of 4 October 2015

Brianna Iris Davey (born 13 January 1995) is an Australian footballer in both the Association football (soccer) and Australian rules football codes. In soccer, she was a goalkeeper for the national women's team the Matildas and played in the W-League for Melbourne Victory and Melbourne City. In 2016, she transitioned from soccer to Australian rules football, and was one of two initial marquee recruits for the Carlton Football Club in the AFL Women's (AFLW). She won the inaugural Carlton best and fairest award and was named in the 2017 AFL Women's All-Australian team. Davey served as Carlton captain from 2018 to 2019 before being traded to the Collingwood Football Club. She was appointed Collingwood co-captain alongside Steph Chiocci in 2021, and won the league best and fairest award for the 2021 season.

== Association football career ==
=== Club ===
Davey was initially an Australian rules football player until discovered kicking a ball at age 13 by a soccer scout while on a family holiday. Instantly discovered to have a talent as goalkeeper, Davey made inroads early and made Victorian representative and elite squads. Signed to Melbourne Victory Women as a fifteen-year-old as back-up keeper to Matildas captain Melissa Barbieri in Season 2010–11, she made three appearances in the short 11 match season. Having done enough to prove to head coach Vicki Linton that she was already as talented as the ageing Barbieri, Linton cut Barbieri and installed Davey as the number one choice. She went on to be the standout keeper for the first half of Season 2011–12 of the W-League.

In August 2013, Davey agreed to play for Swedish Damallsvenskan club Linköping FC during the Australian off-season. Linköping coach Martin Sjögren required a replacement for Sofia Lundgren, who had a back injury. On signing Davey Sjögren described her as "probably the world's most talented goalkeeper".

On 20 August 2015, after five years with Victory, Davey signed a contract with intra-city rivals Melbourne City, becoming the first ever goalkeeper for their newly created W-League side.

=== International ===
Davey has represented Australia in the Young Matildas, often facing-off for the starting position with Brisbane Roar prodigy Casey Dumont.

After being involved in national team camps for over a year, Davey made her international debut for the Matildas in a 4–0 friendly victory over Haiti; keeping a clean sheet.

After a four-month residency programme, national coach Alen Stajcic surprisingly dropped Davey from Australia's 2015 FIFA Women's World Cup squad. Resurgent veteran Melissa Hudson (née Barbieri) was recalled at Davey's expense.

== Australian rules football career ==
After missing the World Cup squad, Davey began playing with the St Kilda Sharks in the Victorian Women's Football League in the 2015 winter. Despite not having played Australian rules football since her early junior days, she was quickly recognised as one of the top midfielders in the competition, also capable of playing as a key defender. She played for the Western Bulldogs in exhibition women's matches in 2015 and 2016, having been the top pick in the 2015 mini-draft held to allocate players for the matches.

=== AFL Women's ===
After having played both codes in parallel for two years (soccer in summer and Australian rules football in winter), Davey committed to Australian rules football, signing as a marquee player for Carlton in the inaugural AFL Women's competition. In January 2017, she was announced as the co-vice-captain of Carlton, alongside Madeline Keryk. She made her debut in round 1, 2017, in the club and the league's inaugural match at IKON Park against Collingwood. At the end of the season, Davey received her team's nominations for both the AFLW Players’ Most Courageous Award and the AFLW Players’ Most Valuable Player Award, and was also listed in the 2017 All-Australian team. She was awarded the club's inaugural best and fairest award in a ceremony in April 2017.

Carlton signed Davey for the 2018 season during the trade period in May 2017. She was appointed the team's captain for the 2018 season, taking over for inaugural captain Lauren Arnell. In round 2 she suffered a serious knee injury that was later confirmed to be a season-ending ruptured anterior cruciate ligament.

Davey returned to Carlton in 2019 and captained them side to a Grand Final appearance against Adelaide, which was subsequently lost.

In April 2019, Davey was traded to Collingwood.

In March 2020, Davey was selected for a 2017–19 retrospective 22under22 squad. In December, it was announced that Davey would co-captain Collingwood alongside inaugural captain Steph Chiocci in 2021. She won the 2021 AFLPA MVP award, beating Fremantle's Kiara Bowers by six votes. She led the league for most handballs per game and was in the top ten for disposals and inside 50s. Davey was also selected as Collingwood's best and fairest for the 2021 season, as well as the AFL Women's best and fairest. Davey was awarded with her second All-Australian blazer, named in the ruck rover position as the captain of the team. It was revealed Davey had signed on with Collingwood for two years on 10 June 2021. Davey achieved selection in Champion Data's 2021 AFLW All-Star stats team. In July 2025, it was announced Davey would hand over the captaincy ahead of the 2025 AFL Women's season to focus on-field after a couple of injury-riddled seasons.

=== AFLW statistics ===
Statistics are correct to the end of the 2025 season

Legend
G	Goals	K	Kicks	D	Disposals	T	Tackles
B	Behinds	H	Handballs	M	Marks

Season	Team	No.	Games	Totals							Averages (per game)							Votes
Season	Team	No.	Games	G	B	K	H	D	M	T	G	B	K	H	D	M	T	Votes
2017	Carlton	1	6	1	0	58	56	114	23	17	0.2	0.0	9.7	9.3	19.0	3.8	2.7	5
2018	Carlton	1	2	0	0	20	12	32	6	8	0.0	0.0	10.0	6.0	16.0	3.0	4.0	5
2019	Carlton	1	9	2	1	81	66	147	31	37	0.2	0.1	9.0	7.3	16.3	3.4	4.1	6
2020	Collingwood	3	6	0	0	56	67	123	15	32	0.0	0.0	9.3	11.2	20.5	2.5	5.3	2
2021	Collingwood	3	11	6	6	139	123^{§}	262^{‡}	39	63	0.5	0.5	12.6	11.2	23.8	3.5	5.7	15^{±}
2022 (S6)	Collingwood	3	1	0	0	9	7	16	2	8	0.0	0.0	9.0	7.0	16.0	2.0	8.0	0
2022 (S7)	Collingwood	3	0	—	—	—	—	—	—	—	—	—	—	—	—	—	—	—
2023	Collingwood	3	10	5	3	116	79	195	24	79	0.5	0.3	11.6	7.9	19.5	2.4	7.9	3
2024	Collingwood	3	5	1	1	37	38	75	6	35	0.2	0.2	7.4	7.6	15.0	1.2	7.0	0
2025	Collingwood	3	0	—	—	—	—	—	—	—	—	—	—	—	—	—	—	—
Career			50	15	11	516	448	964	146	279	0.3	0.2	10.3	9.0	19.3	2.9	5.6	36

== Personal life ==
Davey was involved with fellow AFLW player Tilly Lucas-Rodd.

== See also ==
- Women's association football in Australia
- Women's Australian rules football in Australia
