= Marcellin College, Bulleen =

Marcellin College

Location
- Bulleen, Victoria; Australia; 37°46′29″S 145°4′54″E

Information
- Type: Independent, single-sex
- Motto: Virtute ad Altissima (Strive for the Highest with Virtue and Courage)
- Denomination: Roman Catholic (Marist)
- Established: 1950
- Principal: Marco Di Cesare
- Chaplain: N/A
- Staff: ~170+
- Years offered: 7–12
- Gender: Boys
- Enrolment: 1,173 (7–12)
- Houses: Current: Augustine Champagnat Faulkner Kenny Lavalla Mannes Marlhes Redden Former: Carnie Chirat
- Colours: Maroon, blue & gold
- Slogan: Virtute ad Altissima – Strive for the Highest with Virtue and Courage
- Yearbook: Ad Altissima
- School fees: $12,030 (7–9) $13,430 (10–12)
- Affiliation: Associated Grammar Schools of Victoria
- Website: marcellin.vic.edu.au

Marcellin College is a Catholic secondary boys' college in Bulleen, Victoria, Australia.

The school was founded in 1950 by the Marist Brothers originally in Canterbury Road, Camberwell, Victoria. A senior school campus was opened in Bulleen for years 9 to 12 with the Canterbury campus catering for years 4 to 8. With the school population growing the Junior School in Camberwell stopped accepting students in grades 4, 5 and 6 and took only Years 7 and 8. The college consolidated its campuses in 1993 and the Junior School was closed.

The college is a member of the Associated Grammar Schools of Victoria and the Association of Marist Schools of Australia. It comes under the north eastern region of Catholic Education Melbourne.

== Curriculum ==
Marcellin College offers its senior students the Victorian Certificate of Education (VCE).

VCE results 2012-2025
Year	Rank	Median study score	Scores of 40+ (%)	Cohort size
2012	127	31	9.6	308
2013	135	31	8.6	311
2014	94	32	10.1	280
2015	128	31	8.8	295
2016	156	31	6.1	282
2017	168	30	7.5	291
2018	169	30	8.1	312
2019	138	31	7.8	316
2020	171	30	7.5	341
2021	169	30	18.5	337
2022	183	30	6.6	321
2023	119	31	9	302
2024	153	31	5.1	302
2025	211	30	4.7	277

== Sport ==
Marcellin College is a member of the Associated Grammar Schools of Victoria. The college was formerly a member of the Associated Catholic Colleges from 1952 to 1963.

Marcellin is one of many schools that are "renowned" for their production of AFL players in spite of the fact that the school does not issue scholarships to students who may be talented at a particular sport.

=== AGSV premierships ===
Marcellin has won the following AGSV premierships.

- Athletics (2) – 1968, 2019
- Basketball (17) – 1990, 1991, 1992, 1997, 1998, 1999, 2004, 2011, 2012, 2013, 2014, 2015, 2016, 2017, 2019, 2020, 2021, 2023
- Cricket (11) – 1970, 1974, 1981, 1983, 1994, 2000, 2002, 2007, 2015, 2025, 2026
- Cross Country (27) – 1998, 2000, 2001, 2002, 2003, 2004, 2005, 2006, 2007, 2008, 2009, 2010, 2011, 2012, 2013, 2014, 2015, 2016, 2017, 2018, 2019, 2021, 2022, 2023, 2024, 2025, 2026
- Football (10) – 1977, 1983, 1984, 1997, 1999, 2000, 2015, 2016, 2017, 2026
- Soccer (12) – 1990, 1992, 1995, 1999, 2001, 2005, 2006, 2008, 2009, 2011, 2015, 2021
- Squash (3) – 2000, 2003, 2010
- Tennis – 1999
- Volleyball – 2015

== Notable alumni ==
=== Entertainment, media and the arts ===
- Stephen Curry – actor and comedian
- Kaz James – solo artist & international DJ
- Andrew Maher – media personality (The Front Bar)
- Anthony Pappa – international DJ

=== Politics ===
- Martin Dixon – Former Liberal member of Nepean, Minister for Education 2010–2014
- Michael O'Brien – Liberal Party member of the Victorian Legislative Assembly, former Victorian opposition leader.
- Greg Mirabella – Former Liberal Party senator of the Australian Senate and current president of the Liberal Party of Australia (Victorian Division)

=== Sports ===
==== AFL ====
- Marcus Bontempelli – current Western Bulldogs player and captain
- Callum Brown – former Collingwood player
- Gavin Brown – former AFL Collingwood captain & Premiership player.
- Tyler Brown – former Collingwood player
- Josh Caddy – former Gold Coast, Geelong and Richmond player
- Anthony Carafa – former Fitzroy player.
- Jason Castagna – former Richmond player
- Jason Cripps – former St Kilda player.
- Peter Curran – former Hawthorn Premiership player.
- Paul Dimattina – former Western Bulldogs player & restaurateur.
- Michael Erwin – former Collingwood player
- Dale Fleming – former Fitzroy and Hawthorn player.
- Matthew Head – former AFL field umpire
- Patrick Karnezis – former Brisbane Lions and Collingwood player
- Greg Madigan – former Hawthorn and Fremantle player.
- Frank Marchesani – former Carlton and Fitzroy player.
- Justin McInerney – current Sydney Swans player
- Leigh Montagna – former St Kilda player.
- Jack Newnes – former St Kilda and Carlton player
- Luke Shuey – former West Coast Eagles player.
- Brayden Sier – former Collingwood player
- Stephen Silvagni – former Carlton player, Full Back of the Century.
- Andrew Tranquilli – former Collingwood player
- David Zaharakis – former Essendon player.

==== Soccer ====
- Mark Bresciano – Socceroo, plays also for Al-Gharafa, holds the record for highest transfer fee for an Australian player.
- Daniel Mullen – Socceroos, Adelaide United, Melbourne Victory, Western Sydney Wanderers

==== Tennis ====
- Pat Cash – Tennis Player (attended Marcellin College at the Camberwell Campus on Canterbury Road).
- Peter McNamara – tennis player, former world No. 7.

==== Cricket ====
- Michael Dimattina – Victorian wicketkeeper.

=== Criminals ===
- Alphonse Gangitano – criminal known as the "Black Prince of Lygon Street", face of the Carlton Crew, said to have started the Melbourne Gangland War with the killing of Greg Workman.
