= Finlay Macrae =

Australian rules football player

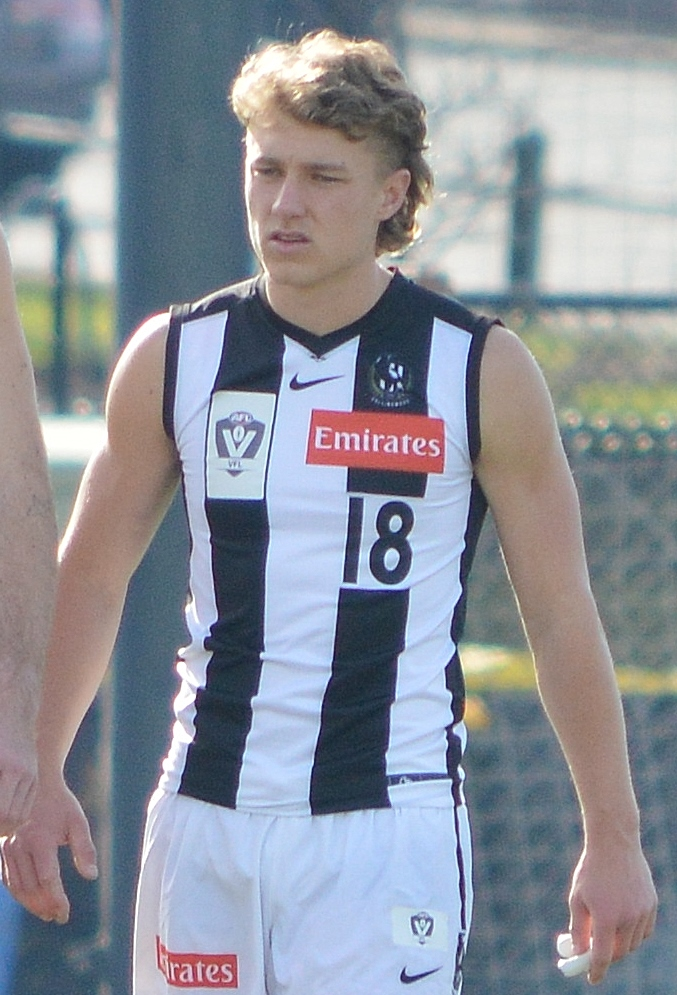
- Macrae with Collingwood's VFL side in July 2021

Personal information
- Full name: Finlay Macrae
- Born: 13 March 2002 (age 24)
- Original team: Oakleigh Chargers(NAB League)/Xavier College(APS)/Kew Rovers(YJFL)
- Draft: Pick 19, 2020 national draft
- Height: 188 cm (6 ft 2 in)
- Weight: 80 kg (176 lb)

Club information
- Current club: West Coast
- Number: 45

Playing career^{1}
Years	Club	Games (Goals)
2021–2025	Collingwood	21 (5)
2026–	West Coast	0 (0)
Total		21 (5)
- ^{1} Playing statistics correct to the end of 2025.

Finlay Macrae (born 13 March 2002) is a professional Australian rules footballer who plays for West Coast in the Australian Football League (AFL). He has previously played for Collingwood.

Finlay is the younger brother of St Kilda player Jack Macrae, who formerly played for the Western Bulldogs. Finlay was educated at Xavier College.

Macrae made his debut in round 5, 2021, against the West Coast Eagles.

Macrae was delisted by Collingwood after the 2025 AFL season, after 21 games over 5 seasons. In November 2025, Macrae joined West Coast via the Supplemental Selection Period. He spent the entire 2026 season playing for the Eagles' team in the West Australian Football League, and hadn't yet made his AFL debut for West Coast.

== Statistics ==
Updated to the end of the 2025 season.

Legend
G	Goals	K	Kicks	D	Disposals	T	Tackles
B	Behinds	H	Handballs	M	Marks

Season	Team	No.	Games	Totals							Averages (per game)							Votes
Season	Team	No.	Games	G	B	K	H	D	M	T	G	B	K	H	D	M	T	Votes
2021	Collingwood	18	9	1	0	45	69	114	26	9	0.1	0.0	5.0	7.7	12.7	2.9	1.0	0
2022	Collingwood	18	2	0	0	6	9	15	1	2	0.0	0.0	3.0	4.5	7.5	0.5	1.0	0
2023	Collingwood	18	1	0	0	0	7	7	0	8	0.0	0.0	0.0	7.0	7.0	0.0	8.0	0
2024	Collingwood	18	9	4	2	46	44	90	8	21	0.4	0.2	5.1	4.9	10.0	0.9	2.3	0
2025	Collingwood	18	0	—	—	—	—	—	—	—	—	—	—	—	—	—	—	0
Career			21	5	2	97	129	226	35	40	0.2	0.1	4.6	6.1	10.8	1.7	1.9	0
