= List of Collingwood Football Club captains =

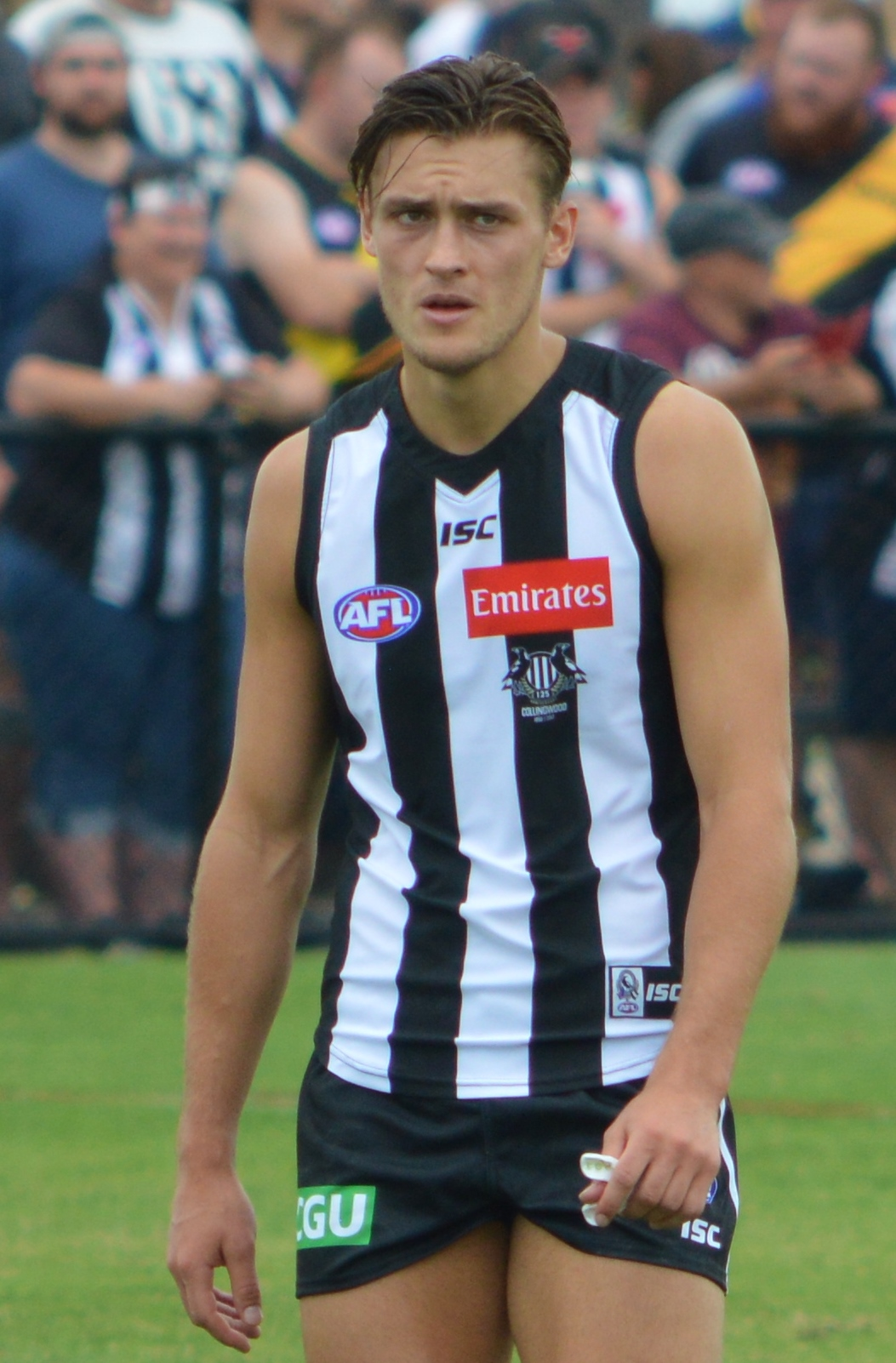
Darcy Moore (pictured here in 2017) is the current captain of Collingwood's AFL team

This is a list of all captains of the Collingwood Football Club, an Australian rules football club in the Australian Football League (AFL) and AFL Women's.

== VFL/AFL ==
Dates	Captain(s)
1897	Bill Strickland
1898	Bill Proudfoot
1899	Bill Proudfoot; Dick Condon
1900	Dick Condon
1901	Bill Proudfoot
1902–1904	Lardie Tulloch
1905	Charlie Pannam
1906	Alf Dummett; Arthur Leach
1907	Arthur Leach
1908	Arthur Leach; Eddie Drohan; Robert Nash
1909	Robert Nash
1910–1911	George Angus
1912–1913	Jock McHale
1914–1916	Dan Minogue
1917	Jock McHale; Percy Wilson
1918	Percy Wilson
1919	Con McCarthy
1920–1921	Dick Lee
1922	Tom Drummond
1923	Harry Curtis
1924–1926	Charlie Tyson
1927–1934	Syd Coventry
1935–1939	Harry Collier
1940–1941	Jack Regan
1942	Phonse Kyne
1943	Jack Regan
1944	Pat Fricker
1945	Alby Pannam
1946–1949	Phonse Kyne
1950–1951	Gordon Hocking
1952–1955	Lou Richards
1955–1956	Neil Mann
1957	Bill Twomey, Jr.
1958–1959	Frank Tuck
1960–1963	Murray Weideman
1964	Ray Gabelich
1965	Ray Gabelich; John Henderson
1966–1969	Des Tuddenham
1970	Terry Waters
1971	Terry Waters; Wayne Richardson
1972–1975	Wayne Richardson
1976	Des Tuddenham
1977	Max Richardson
1978	Len Thompson
1979–1980	Ray Shaw
1981–1982	Peter Moore
1983–1986	Mark Williams
1987–1993	Tony Shaw
1994–1998	Gavin Brown
1999–2007	Nathan Buckley
2008	Scott Burns
2009–2013	Nick Maxwell
2014–2022	Scott Pendlebury
2023–	Darcy Moore

== AFL Women's ==
Seasons	Captain(s)
2017–2020	Steph Chiocci
2021–2022 (S7)	Steph Chiocci; Brianna Davey
2023–2024	Brianna Davey
2025–2026	Ruby Schleicher
