= 2023 Collingwood Football Club season =

Australian Football League team season

Collingwood Football Club
2023 season
- President: Jeff Browne
- Coach: See below
- Captain: See below
- Home ground: See below
- Regular season: See below
- Finals series: See below
- Average home attendance: 65,518
- Club membership: 106,470

The 2023 Collingwood Football Club season was the club's 127th season of senior competition in the Australian Football League (AFL). The club also fielded its reserves team in the Victorian Football League and women's teams in the AFL Women's and VFL Women's competitions. Prior to the season, Scott Pendlebury stepped down as captain after nine years as skipper.

== Overview ==
Collingwood's 2023 season overview
Team	Captain(s)	Coach	Home ground	W–L–D	Ladder	Finals	Best and fairest	Leading goalkicker	Refs
AFL	Darcy Moore	Craig McRae	Melbourne Cricket Ground	18–5–0	1st	Premiers	Josh Daicos	Brody Mihocek (47)	
AFLW	Brianna Davey	Stephen Symonds	Victoria Park	5–5–0	11th	DNQ	Brittany Bonnici	Nell Morris-Dalton (8)	
VFL	Campbell Hustwaite & Lachlan Tardrew	Josh Fraser	Victoria Park & AIA Centre	11–7–0	8th	Elimination final	Campbell Hustwaite	Reef McInnes (32)	
VFLW	Caitlin Bunker	Chloe McMillan	Victoria Park	9–5–0	1st	Runner-ups	Jessica Bates	Monique DeMatteo (16)	

== Squad ==
Players are listed by guernsey number, and 2023 statistics are for AFL regular season and finals series matches during the 2023 AFL season only. Career statistics include a player's complete AFL career, which, as a result, means that a player's debut and part or whole of their career statistics may be for another club. Statistics are correct as of the Grand Final of the 2023 season (30 September 2023) and are taken from AFL Tables.

No.	Name	AFL debut	Games (2023)	Goals (2023)	Games (CFC)	Goals (CFC)	Games (AFL career)	Goals (AFL career)
1	Patrick Lipinski	2017 (Western Bulldogs)	14	5	39	14	95	44
2	Jordan De Goey	2015	21	18	158	191	158	191
3	Isaac Quaynor	2019	26	0	85	3	85	3
4	Brayden Maynard	2015	25	0	186	17	186	17
5	Jamie Elliott	2012	24	39	179	266	179	266
6	Tom Mitchell	2013 (Sydney)	26	7	26	7	197	83
7	Josh Daicos	2017	26	16	103	57	103	57
8	Trent Bianco	2021	1	0	23	8	23	8
9	John Noble	2019	23	3	92	7	92	7
10	Scott Pendlebury	2006	25	9	383	194	383	194
11	Daniel McStay	2014 (Brisbane Lions)	14	20	14	20	175	158
12	Tom Wilson	2021	1	0	8	2	8	2
13	Taylor Adams	2012 (Greater Western Sydney)	22	13	175	64	206	76
14	Darcy Cameron	2018 (Sydney)	19	5	71	51	72	51
15	Nathan Kreuger	2021 (Geelong)	2	0	7	4	9	4
16	Ed Allan	****	0	0	0	0	0	0
17	Billy Frampton	2018 (Port Adelaide)	16	7	16	7	40	19
18	Finlay Macrae	2021	1	0	12	1	12	1
19	Arlo Draper	****	0	0	0	0	0	0
20	Will Kelly	2020	2	0	5	1	5	1
21	Trey Ruscoe	2020	1	0	18	7	18	7
22	Steele Sidebottom	2009	20	4	309	190	309	190
23	Bobby Hill	2019 (Greater Western Sydney)	24	33	24	33	65	67
24	Jakob Ryan	2023	1	0	1	0	1	0
25	Jack Crisp	2012 (Brisbane Lions)	26	10	208	63	226	73
26	Reef McInnes	2022	5	3	11	6	11	6
27	Cooper Murley	****	0	0	0	0	0	0
28	Nathan Murphy	2018	24	0	57	1	57	1
29	Joe Richards	****	0	0	0	0	0	0
30	Darcy Moore (c)	2015	24	0	150	67	150	67
31	Beau McCreery	2021	25	17	60	42	60	42
32	Will Hoskin-Elliott	2012 (Greater Western Sydney)	23	10	152	127	204	169
33	Jack Ginnivan	2021	14	12	42	58	42	58
35	Nick Daicos	2022	22	19	47	26	47	26
36	Harvey Harrison	2023	4	3	4	3	4	3
37	Oleg Markov	2016 (Richmond)	23	1	23	1	74	6
38	Jeremy Howe	2011 (Melbourne)	14	7	133	18	233	98
39	Aiden Begg	2022	0	0	3	0	3	0
40	Ash Johnson	2022	15	21	24	36	24	36
41	Brody Mihocek	2018	24	47	126	212	126	212
43	Charlie Dean	****	0	0	0	0	0	0
44	Oscar Steene	****	0	0	0	0	0	0
45	Josh Carmichael	2022	1	0	8	4	8	4
46	Mason Cox	2016	19	17	113	117	113	117

=== Squad changes ===
==== In ====
No.	Name	Position	Previous club	via
23	(Western Australia) Bobby Hill	Forward	Greater Western Sydney	trade
11	(Victoria (state)) Daniel McStay	Forward	Brisbane Lions	unrestricted free agent
17	(Western Australia) Billy Frampton	Defender / Ruck	Adelaide	trade
6	(Victoria (state)) Tom Mitchell	Midfielder	Hawthorn	trade
16	(Western Australia) Ed Allan	Utility	Claremont	AFL national draft, first round (pick No. 19)
24	(South Australia) Jakob Ryan	Defender	Glenelg	AFL national draft, second round (pick No. 28)
29	(Victoria (state)) Joe Richards	Midfielder	Wangaratta	AFL national draft, third round (pick No. 48)
27	(South Australia) Cooper Murley	Midfielder	Collingwood	AFL rookie draft, first round (pick No. 16)
44	(South Australia) Oscar Steene	Ruck	West Adelaide	Pre-season supplemental selection
37	(South Australia) Oleg Markov	Defender	Gold Coast	Pre-season supplemental selection

==== Out ====
No.	Name	Position	New Club	via
6	(Victoria (state)) Tyler Brown	Midfielder		delisted
17	(Victoria (state)) Callum Brown	Midfielder		delisted
29	(Victoria (state)) Liam McMahon	Forward		delisted
34	(Tasmania) Isaac Chugg	Midfielder / Defender		delisted
4	(South Australia) Brodie Grundy	Ruck	Melbourne	trade
16	(Victoria (state)) Oliver Henry	Forward	Geelong	trade
24	(South Australia) Caleb Poulter	Midfielder / Forward		delisted
27	(South Australia) Cooper Murley	Midfielder		delisted
44	(South Australia) Jack Madgen	Defender		delisted

== AFL season ==
=== Pre-season matches ===
Collingwood's 2023 practice match and AAMI Community Series fixtures
Date and local time	Opponent	Scores^{[a]}			Venue	Ref
Date and local time	Opponent	Home	Away	Result	Venue	Ref
Friday, 24 February (11:00 am)	Carlton	12.12 (84)	11.8 (74)	Lost by 10 points^{[b]}	Ikon Park [A]	
Thursday, 2 March (5:10 pm)	Hawthorn	14.16 (100)	15.16 (106)	Won by 6 points	UTAS Stadium [A]	

=== Regular season ===
Collingwood's 2023 AFL season fixture
Round	Date and local time	Opponent	Home	Away	Result	Venue	Attendance	Ladder position	Ref
Round	Date and local time	Opponent	Scores^{[a]}			Venue	Attendance	Ladder position	Ref
1	Friday, 17 March (7:40 pm)	Geelong	16.7 (103)	19.11 (125)	Won by 22 points	MCG [A]	86,595	6th	
2	Saturday, 25 March (1:45 pm)	Port Adelaide	21.9 (135)	9.10 (64)	Won by 71 points	MCG [H]	60,744	4th	
3	Friday, 31 March (7:50 pm)	Richmond	8.15 (63)	7.7 (49)	Won by 14 points	MCG [H]	85,241	2nd	
4	Thursday, 6 April (7:35 pm)	Brisbane Lions	18.8 (116)	11.17 (83)	Lost by 33 points	The Gabba [A]	33,565	5th	
5	Sunday, 16 April (4:20 pm)	St Kilda	9.10 (64)	10.10 (70)	Won by 6 points	Adelaide Oval [A]	43,796	3rd	
6	Tuesday, 25 April (3:20 pm)	Essendon	13.12 (90)	11.11 (77)	Won by 13 points	MCG [H]	95,179	2nd	
7	Sunday, 30 April (4:10 pm)	Adelaide	7.16 (58)	8.11 (59)	Won by 1 point	Adelaide Oval [H]	43,942	1st	
8	Sunday, 7 May (3:20 pm)	Sydney	11.11 (77)	6.12 (48)	Won by 29 points	MCG [H]	71,463	1st	
9	Sunday, 14 May (4:40 pm)	Greater Western Sydney	18.12 (120)	7.13 (55)	Won by 65 points	MCG [H]	37,631	1st	
10	Sunday, 21 May (3:20 pm)	Carlton	7.15 (57)	13.7 (85)	Won by 28 points	MCG [A]	80,354	1st	
11	Sunday, 28 May (3:20 pm)	North Melbourne	16.9 (105)	10.10 (70)	Won by 35 points	Marvel Stadium [H]	39,467	1st	
12	Saturday, 3 June (2:35 pm)	West Coast	8.9 (57)	18.12 (120)	Won by 63 points	Optus Stadium [A]	41,713	1st	
13	Monday, 12 June (3:20 pm)	Melbourne	8.18 (66)	9.8 (62)	Lost by 4 points	MCG [A]	83,578	1st	
14	Bye							2nd	Bye
15	Sunday, 25 June (1:10 pm)	Adelaide	12.10 (82)	11.14 (80)	Won by 2 points	MCG [H]	65,930	1st	
16	Saturday, 1 July (4:35 pm)	Gold Coast	5.12 (42)	18.12 (120)	Won by 78 points	Heritage Bank Stadium [A]	22,483	1st	
17	Friday, 7 July (7:50 pm)	Western Bulldogs	11.11 (77)	13.11 (89)	Won by 12 points	Marvel Stadium [A]	43,482	1st	
18	Saturday, 15 July (1:45 pm)	Fremantle	18.5 (113)	10.7 (67)	Won by 46 points	MCG [H]	61,157	1st	
19	Saturday, 22 July (7:40 pm)	Port Adelaide	12.11 (83)	13.7 (85)	Won by 2 points	Adelaide Oval [A]	47,965	1st	
20	Friday, 28 July (7:50 pm)	Carlton	10.16 (76)	14.9 (93)	Lost by 17 points	MCG [H]	86,785	1st	
21	Saturday, 5 August (4:35 pm)	Hawthorn	16.9 (105)	11.7 (73)	Lost by 32 points	MCG [A]	62,134	1st	
22	Friday, 11 August (7:50 pm)	Geelong	16.13 (109)	15.11 (101)	Won by 8 points	MCG [H]	78,749	1st	
23	Friday, 18 August (7:50 pm)	Brisbane Lions	15.10 (100)	19.10 (124)	Lost by 24 points	Marvel Stadium [H]	39,350	1st	
24	Friday, 25 August (7:50 pm)	Essendon	3.13 (31)	16.5 (101)	Won by 70 points	MCG [A]	74,344	1st	

=== Finals series ===
Collingwood's 2023 AFL finals series fixtures
Round	Date and local time	Opponent	Home	Away	Result	Venue	Attendance	Ref
Round	Date and local time	Opponent	Scores^{[a]}			Venue	Attendance	Ref
1st Qualifying final	Thursday, 7 September (7:20 pm)	Melbourne	9.6 (60)	7.11 (53)	Won by 7 points	MCG [H]	92,636	
1st Preliminary final	Friday, 22 September (7:50 pm)	Greater Western Sydney	8.10 (58)	8.9 (57)	Won by 1 point	MCG [H]	97,665	
Grand Final	Saturday, 30 September (2:30 pm)	Brisbane Lions	12.18 (90)	13.8 (86)	Won by 4 points	MCG [H]	100,024	

=== Ladder ===
Pos	Team	Pld	W	L	D	PF	PA	PP	Pts	Qualification
1	Collingwood (P)	23	18	5	0	2142	1687	127.0	72	Finals series
2	Brisbane Lions	23	17	6	0	2180	1771	123.1	68	Finals series
3	Port Adelaide	23	17	6	0	2149	1906	112.7	68	Finals series
4	Melbourne	23	16	7	0	2079	1660	125.2	64	Finals series
5	Carlton	23	13	9	1	1922	1697	113.3	54	Finals series
6	St Kilda	23	13	10	0	1775	1647	107.8	52	Finals series
7	Greater Western Sydney	23	13	10	0	2018	1885	107.1	52	Finals series
8	Sydney	23	12	10	1	2050	1863	110.0	50	Finals series
9	Western Bulldogs	23	12	11	0	1919	1766	108.7	48	
10	Adelaide	23	11	12	0	2193	1877	116.8	44	
11	Essendon	23	11	12	0	1838	2050	89.7	44	
12	Geelong	23	10	12	1	2088	1855	112.6	42	
13	Richmond	23	10	12	1	1856	1983	93.6	42	
14	Fremantle	23	10	13	0	1835	1898	96.7	40	
15	Gold Coast	23	9	14	0	1839	2006	91.7	36	
16	Hawthorn	23	7	16	0	1686	2101	80.2	28	
17	North Melbourne	23	3	20	0	1657	2318	71.5	12	
18	West Coast	23	3	20	0	1418	2674	53.0	12	

Source: afl.com.au
Rules for classification: 1) points; 2) percentage; 3) number of points for
(P) Premiers

=== Awards & Milestones ===
==== AFL awards ====
- Anzac Medal – Nick Daicos (Round 6)
- 2023 22under22 selection (captain) – Nick Daicos
- 2023 All-Australian team – Josh Daicos, Nick Daicos, Darcy Moore
- AFL Coaches Association Best Young Player – Nick Daicos
- Norm Smith Medal - Bobby Hill (Grand Final)

==== AFL award nominations ====
- 2023 All-Australian team 44-man squad – Josh Daicos, Nick Daicos, Jordan De Goey, Darcy Moore, Isaac Quaynor

==== Club awards ====
- E.W. Copeland Trophy – Josh Daicos
- R.T. Rush Trophy – Nick Daicos & Brayden Maynard
- J.F. McHale Trophy – Tom Mitchell
- Jack Regan Trophy – Scott Pendlebury
- Joseph Wren Memorial Trophy – Campbell Hustwaite
- Darren Millane Memorial Trophy – Brayden Maynard
- Harry Collier Trophy – Jakob Ryan
- Gordon Coventry Trophy – Brody Mihocek
- Gavin Brown Award – Beau McCreery
- Bob Rose Award – Jack Crisp

==== Milestones ====
- Round 1 – Bobby Hill (Collingwood debut)
- Round 1 – Daniel McStay (Collingwood debut)
- Round 1 – Tom Mitchell (Collingwood debut)
- Round 2 – Billy Frampton (Collingwood debut)
- Round 4 – Oleg Markov (Collingwood debut)
- Round 9 – Bobby Hill (50 AFL games)
- Round 10 – Jack Crisp (Most consecutive Collingwood games – 192)
- Round 10 – Darcy Moore (AFL equal record for most intercept marks in a game – 10)
- Round 11 – Steele Sidebottom (300 games)
- Round 11 – Mason Cox (100 games)
- Round 12 – Harvey Harrison (AFL debut)
- Round 16 – Beau McCreery (50 games)
- Round 17 - Scott Pendlebury (breaks AFL all-time disposal record)
- Round 19 – Taylor Adams (200 AFL games)
- Round 19 – Jack Crisp (200 Collingwood games)
- Round 19 – Nathan Murphy (50 games)
- Round 22 – Brody Mihocek (200 goals)
- Round 23 – Will Hoskin-Elliott (200 AFL games)
- Round 23 – Jakob Ryan (AFL debut)
- Round 24 – Josh Daicos (100 games)
- Grand Final – Darcy Moore (150 games)

== VFL season ==
=== Pre-season matches ===
Collingwood's 2023 VFL practice matches
Date and local time	Opponent	Scores^{[a]}			Venue	Ref
Date and local time	Opponent	Home	Away	Result	Venue	Ref
Friday, 24 February (2:00 pm)	Carlton	12.12 (84)	11.8 (74)	Lost by 10 points	Ikon Park [A]	
Thursday, 2 March (7:00 pm)	Box Hill	7.8 (50)	10.17 (77)	Lost by 27 points	AIA Centre [H]	
Saturday, 18 March (2:00 pm)	Geelong	10.5 (65)	8.11 (59)	Won by 6 points	AIA Centre [H]	

=== Regular season ===
Collingwood's 2023 VFL season fixture
Round	Date and local time	Opponent	Home	Away	Result	Venue	Ladder position	Ref
Round	Date and local time	Opponent	Scores^{[a]}			Venue	Ladder position	Ref
1	Saturday, 25 March (11:05 am)	Coburg	22.9 (141)	6.13 (49)	Won by 92 points	Victoria Park [H]	3rd	
2	Saturday, 1 April (7:05 pm)	Port Melbourne	12.10 (82)	21.8 (134)	Won by 52 points	ETU Stadium [A]	1st	
3	Thursday, 6 April (1:05 pm)	Brisbane	17.16 (118)	7.9 (51)	Lost by 67 points	Brighton Homes Arena [A]	7th	
4	Sunday, 16 April (12:00 pm)	Box Hill	17.12 (114)	8.7 (55)	Lost by 59 points	Box Hill City Oval [A]	8th	
5	Sunday, 23 April (12:00 pm)	Essendon	14.13 (97)	13.11 (89)	Won by 8 points	AIA Centre [H]	7th	
6	Bye						7th	Bye
7	Sunday, 7 May (12:00 pm)	Williamstown	9.14 (68)	6.8 (44)	Lost by 24 points	Williamstown Cricket Ground [A]	9th	
8	Sunday, 14 May (11:05 am)	Greater Western Sydney	17.9 (111)	17.11 (113)	Lost by 2 points	AIA Centre [H]	12th	
9	Bye						13th	Bye
10	Sunday, 28 May (11:05 am)	North Melbourne	5.13 (43)	11.16 (82)	Lost by 39 points	AIA Centre [H]	14th	
11	Sunday, 4 June (2:05 pm)	Northern Bullants	9.10 (64)	16.19 (115)	Won by 51 points	Preston City Oval [A]	13th	
12	Sunday, 11 June (1:05 pm)	Casey	8.11 (59)	11.7 (73)	Won by 14 points	Casey Fields [A]	12th	
13	Bye						13th	Bye
14	Saturday, 24 June (10:05 am)	Sydney	14.10 (94)	9.17 (71)	Won by 23 points	AIA Centre [H]	12th	
15	Sunday, 2 July (12:00 am)	Frankston	4.7 (31)	18.18 (126)	Won by 95 points	Kinetic Stadium [A]	10th	
16	Friday, 7 July (4:05 pm)	Footscray	14.13 (97)	11.11 (77)	Lost by 20 points	ETU Stadium [A]	10th	
17	Bye						12th	Bye
18	Sunday, 23 July (12:00 pm)	Sandringham	9.10 (64)	6.12 (48)	Won by 16 points	AIA Centre [H]	11th	
19	Saturday, 29 July (1:05 pm)	Carlton	14.16 (100)	11.6 (72)	Won by 28 points	Victoria Park [H]	10th	
20	Sunday, 6 August (12:00 pm)	Werribee	14.9 (93)	8.10 (58)	Lost by 35 points	Avalon Airport Oval [A]	10th	
21	Saturday, 12 August (12:05 pm)	Geelong	20.9 (129)	8.7 (55)	Won by 74 points	Victoria Park [H]	9th	
22	Saturday, 19 August (12:05 pm)	Southport	16.12 (108)	8.10 (58)	Won by 50 points	AIA Centre [H]	8th	
Wildcard Round	Sunday, 27 August (12:00 pm)	Richmond	21.9 (135)	8.12 (60)	Won by 75 points	Swinburne Centre [H]	—N/a	

=== Finals series ===
Collingwood's 2023 VFL finals series fixture
Round	Date and local time	Opponent	Home	Away	Result	Venue	Ref
Round	Date and local time	Opponent	Scores^{[a]}			Venue	Ref
1st Elimination Final	Saturday, 2 September (3:00 pm)	Williamstown	12.10 (82)	3.9 (27)	Lost by 55 points	DSV Stadium [A]	
Collingwood was eliminated from the 2023 VFL finals series

=== Ladder ===
Pos	Team	Pld	W	L	D	PF	PA	PP	Pts	Qualification
6	Footscray (R)	18	12	6	0	1659	1278	129.8	48	Finals series
7	Casey	18	11	7	0	1607	1255	128.0	44	Finals series
8	Collingwood (R)	18	11	7	0	1620	1363	118.9	44	Finals series
9	Richmond (R)	18	10	7	1	1347	1359	99.1	42	Finals series
10	North Melbourne (R)	18	10	8	0	1505	1369	109.9	40	Finals series

Source: afl.com.au
Rules for classification: 1) points; 2) percentage; 3) number of points for
(R) = Reserves

== AFLW season ==
=== Pre-season matches ===
Collingwood's 2023 AFLW pre-season fixture
Date and time	Opponent	Home	Away	Result	Venue	Ref
Date and time	Opponent	Scores^{[a]}			Venue	Ref
Saturday, 12 August (3:00 pm)	Geelong	3.4 (22)	5.6 (36)	Lost by 14 points	Victoria Park [H]	
Saturday, 19 August (11:05 am)	Fremantle	4.7 (31)	4.6 (30)	Lost by 1 point	Victor George Kailis Oval [A]	

=== Regular season ===
Collingwood's 2023 AFL Women's season fixture
Round	Date and time	Opponent	Home	Away	Result	Venue	Attendance	Ladder position	Ref
Round	Date and time	Opponent	Scores^{[a]}			Venue	Attendance	Ladder position	Ref
1	Friday, 1 September (7:20 pm)	Melbourne	10.13 (73)	4.7 (31)	Lost by 42 points	Ikon Park [A]	8,412	16th	
2	Sunday, 10 September (1:05 pm)	Fremantle	7.4 (46)	3.7 (25)	Won by 21 points	Victoria Park [H]	1,914	11th	
3	Sunday, 17 September (3:05 pm)	Gold Coast	2.9 (21)	5.3 (33)	Lost by 12 points	Victoria Park [H]	2,537	12th	
4	Sunday, 24 September (3:05 pm)	St Kilda	7.5 (47)	5.5 (35)	Lost by 12 points	RSEA Park [A]	3,230	12th	
5	Saturday, 30 September (11:05 am)	Essendon	6.8 (44)	3.6 (24)	Won by 20 points	Punt Road Oval [H]	1,422	11th	
6	Saturday, 7 October (6:15 pm)	Brisbane	3.10 (28)	5.3 (33)	Won by 5 points	Brighton Homes Arena [A]	3,276	12th	
7	Sunday, 15 October (3:05 pm)	Carlton	1.4 (10)	4.3 (27)	Won by 17 points	Ikon Park [A]	3,111	8th	
8	Sunday, 22 October (1:05 pm)	Geelong	4.6 (30)	3.6 (24)	Won by 6 points	Victoria Park [H]		6th	
9	Sunday, 29 October (1:05 pm)	Sydney	9.4 (58)	5.9 (39)	Lost by 19 points	Henson Park [A]	5,722	10th	
10	Sunday, 5 November (3:05 pm)	Richmond	4.1 (25)	11.11 (77)	Lost by 52 points	Victoria Park [H]		11th	

=== Ladder ===
Pos	Team	Pld	W	L	D	PF	PA	PP	Pts	Qualification
1	Adelaide	10	9	1	0	599	314	190.8	36	Finals series
2	Melbourne	10	8	2	0	653	293	222.9	32	Finals series
3	North Melbourne	10	7	3	0	478	213	224.4	28	Finals series
4	Brisbane (P)	10	7	3	0	505	339	149.0	28	Finals series
5	Gold Coast	10	6	3	1	416	351	118.5	26	Finals series
6	Geelong	10	6	4	0	449	318	141.2	24	Finals series
7	Essendon	10	6	4	0	379	354	107.1	24	Finals series
8	Sydney	10	6	4	0	462	432	106.9	24	Finals series
9	St Kilda	10	6	4	0	408	399	102.3	24	
10	Richmond	10	5	5	0	382	379	100.8	20	
11	Collingwood	10	5	5	0	331	399	83.0	20	
12	Carlton	10	4	6	0	361	420	86.0	16	
13	Fremantle	10	4	6	0	289	402	71.9	16	
14	Hawthorn	10	3	7	0	307	456	67.3	12	
15	Port Adelaide	10	2	7	1	404	538	75.1	10	
16	Greater Western Sydney	10	2	8	0	316	596	53.0	8	
17	West Coast	10	2	8	0	269	530	50.8	8	
18	Western Bulldogs	10	1	9	0	320	595	53.8	4	

Source: afl.com.au
Rules for classification: 1) points; 2) percentage; 3) number of points for
(P) Premiers

=== Squad ===
Players are listed by guernsey number, and 2023 statistics are for AFL Women's regular season and finals series matches during the 2023 AFL Women's season only. Career statistics include a player's complete AFL Women's career, which, as a result, means that a player's debut and part or whole of their career statistics may be for another club. Statistics are correct as of round 10 of the 2023 season (5 November 2023) and are taken from Australian Football.

No.	Name	AFLW debut	Games (2023)	Goals (2023)	Games (CFC)	Goals (CFC)	Games (AFLW career)	Goals (AFLW career)
1	Sabrina Frederick	2017 (Brisbane)	10	4	31	10	69	30
2	Eliza James	2022 (S6)	6	2	27	17	27	17
3	Brianna Davey (c)	2017 (Carlton)	10	5	28	11	45	14
4	Imogen Barnett	2022 (S6)	1	0	12	0	12	0
5	Imogen Evans	2022 (S7)	1	0	6	1	6	1
6	Jordyn Allen	2019	10	0	52	5	52	5
7	Sarah Rowe	2019	10	1	53	12	53	12
8	Brittany Bonnici	2017	10	1	57	4	57	4
9	Alana Porter	2020	7	2	44	3	44	3
10	Ashleigh Brazill	2018	8	2	32	5	32	5
11	Charlotte Taylor	2022 (S7)	1	0	4	0	4	0
12	Stacey Livingstone	2017	9	0	66	0	66	0
13	Grace Campbell	2020 (Richmond)	10	2	10	2	28	4
14	Aishling Sheridan	2020	10	1	47	15	47	15
15	Erica Fowler	2019	9	2	39	2	39	2
16	Sarah Sansonetti	2020 (Richmond)	8	0	18	0	35	0
17	Nell Morris-Dalton	2020 (Western Bulldogs)	10	8	10	8	30	16
18	Ruby Schleicher	2017	2	0	53	3	53	3
19	Olivia Barber	2021 (Geelong)	0	0	4	2	14	5
20	Selena Karlson	2019 (Western Bulldogs)	6	0	6	0	9	0
21	Eleri Morris	2023	10	6	10	6	10	6
22	Sophie Casey	2017	10	0	63	2	63	2
23	Lauren Butler	2019	4	0	44	1	44	1
24	Lauren Brazzale	2017 (Carlton)	10	0	21	0	62	7
25	Mikala Cann	2019	10	3	54	11	54	11
26	Tarni Brown	2021	5	1	34	9	34	9
28	Charlotte Blair	2023	1	0	1	0	1	0
29	Tarni White	2020 (St Kilda)	10	2	10	2	42	5
33	Emily Smith	2022 (S7)	8	4	9	4	9	4
35	Joanna Lin	2021	4	0	21	4	21	4

==== Squad changes ====
In

No.	Name	Position	Previous club	via
13	(Victoria (state)) Grace Campbell	Midfielder	North Melbourne	trade
29	(Queensland) Tarni White	Midfielder	St Kilda	trade
17	(Victoria (state)) Nell Morris-Dalton	Forward	Western Bulldogs	trade
21	(Victoria (state)) Eleri Morris	Forward	Collingwood Reserves	AFLW National Draft, first round (pick no. 13)
20	(Victoria (state)) Selena Karlson	Defender	Collingwood Reserves	AFLW National Draft, first round (pick no. 14)

Out

No.	Name	Position	New Club	via
2	(Victoria (state)) Chloe Molloy	Forward	Sydney	Priority signing
13	(Victoria (state)) Jaimee Lambert	Midfielder	St Kilda	trade
17	(Victoria (state)) Steph Chiocci	Midfielder	St Kilda	trade
32	(Victoria (state)) Eloise Chaston	Forward		delisted
40	(Victoria (state)) Abbi Moloney	Forward		delisted
21	(Victoria (state)) Jordan Membrey	Midfielder / Forward	Gold Coast	trade
30	(Victoria (state)) Alison Downie	Ruck		retired

=== Club awards ===
- Best and fairest – Brittany Bonnici
- Best first year player – Grace Campbell
- Players' player award – Brittany Bonnici, Brianna Davey, Sarah Rowe
- Leading goalkicker – Nell Morris-Dalton (8 goals)

== VFLW season ==
=== Pre-season matches ===
Collingwood's 2023 VFLW practice matches
Date and local time	Opponent	Scores^{[a]}			Venue	Ref
Date and local time	Opponent	Home	Away	Result	Venue	Ref
Saturday, 4 March (1:00 pm)	North Melbourne				Arden Street Oval [A]	
Saturday, 11 March (11:00 am)	Carlton	6.5 (41)	3.3 (21)	Lost by 20 points	Ikon Park [A]	

=== Regular season ===
Collingwood's 2023 VFL Women's season fixture
Round	Date and local time	Opponent	Home	Away	Result	Venue	Ladder position	Ref
Round	Date and local time	Opponent	Scores^{[a]}			Venue	Ladder position	Ref
1	Saturday, 25 March (3:00 pm)	Williamstown	3.10 (28)	2.1 (13)	Won by 15 points	Victoria Park [H]	3rd	
2	Saturday, 1 April (4:30 pm)	Port Melbourne	9.3 (57)	2.8 (20)	Lost by 37 points	ETU Stadium [A]	8th	
3	Friday, 7 April (12:00 pm)	Casey	3.7 (25)	6.6 (42)	Won by 17 points	Casey Fields [A]	7th	
4	Sunday, 16 April (3:30 pm)	Box Hill	3.3 (21)	7.3 (45)	Won by 24 points	Box Hill City Oval [A]	4th	
5	Saturday, 22 April (11:00 am)	Essendon	2.3 (15)	4.7 (31)	Lost by 16 points	Victoria Park [H]	5th	
6	Saturday, 29 April (11:00 am)	Darebin	8.11 (59)	5.3 (33)	Won by 26 points	Victoria Park [H]	4th	
7	Saturday, 6 May (10:30 am)	Geelong Cats	4.3 (27)	4.6 (30)	Won by 3 points	Deakin University [A]	3rd	
8	Sunday, 14 May (3:00 pm)	North Melbourne	7.7 (49)	6.3 (39)	Won by 10 points	AIA Centre [H]	2nd	
9	Saturday, 20 May (11:00 am)	Southern Saints	1.7 (13)	2.6 (18)	Lost by 5 points	Victoria Park [H]	3rd	
10	Saturday, 27 May (11:00 am)	Western Bulldogs	6.4 (40)	3.6 (24)	Lost by 16 points	ETU Stadium [A]	6th	
11	Sunday, 4 June (10:30 am)	Darebin	2.1 (13)	11.6 (72)	Won by 59 points	Preston City Oval [A]	3rd	
12	Saturday, 17 June (11:00 am)	Carlton	4.2 (26)	5.4 (34)	Lost by 8 points	AIA Centre [H]	6th	
13	Saturday, 24 June (10:00 am)	Geelong Cats	5.13 (43)	0.3 (3)	Won by 40 points	AIA Centre [H]	2nd	
14	Saturday, 1 July (3:00 pm)	North Melbourne	3.5 (23)	8.8 (56)	Won by 33 points	Arden Street Oval [A]	1st	

=== Finals series ===
Collingwood's 2023 VFL Women's finals series fixtures
Round	Date and time	Opponent	Home	Away	Result	Venue	Ref
Round	Date and time	Opponent	Scores^{[a]}			Venue	Ref
Qualifying final	Sunday, 9 July (11:00 am)	Port Melbourne	7.6 (48)	3.4 (22)	Won by 26 points	Victoria Park [H]	
Semi final	Saturday, 15 July (1:00 pm)	Essendon	3.4 (22)	2.6 (18)	Won by 4 points	Victoria Park [H]	
Grand Final	Sunday, 30 July (12:10 pm)	Port Melbourne	3.5 (23)	5.5 (35)	Lost by 12 points	ETU Stadium [H]	

=== Ladder ===
Pos	Team	Pld	W	L	D	PF	PA	PP	Pts	Qualification
1	Collingwood	14	9	5	0	522	377	138.5	36	Finals series
2	Port Melbourne (P)	14	9	5	0	450	351	128.2	36	Finals series
3	Williamstown	14	9	5	0	471	368	128.0	36	Finals series
4	Box Hill	14	8	4	2	444	358	124.0	36	Finals series
5	Essendon	14	8	5	1	404	387	104.4	34	Finals series

Source: AFL.com.au
Rules for classification: 1) points; 2) percentage; 3) number of points for.
(P) Premiers

== Notes ==
Key

- H Home match.
- A Away match.

Notes

- **^{a}** Collingwood's scores are indicated in **bold** font.
- **^{b}** Match was played over 4 quarters of 25 minutes each.
