= Daicos =

Daicos is a surname. Notable people with the surname include:

- Josh Daicos (born 1998), Australian rules footballer
- Nick Daicos (born 2003), Australian rules footballer
- Peter Daicos (born 1961), Australian rules footballer
