= 2023 AFL Grand Final =

Grand final of the 2023 Australian Football League season

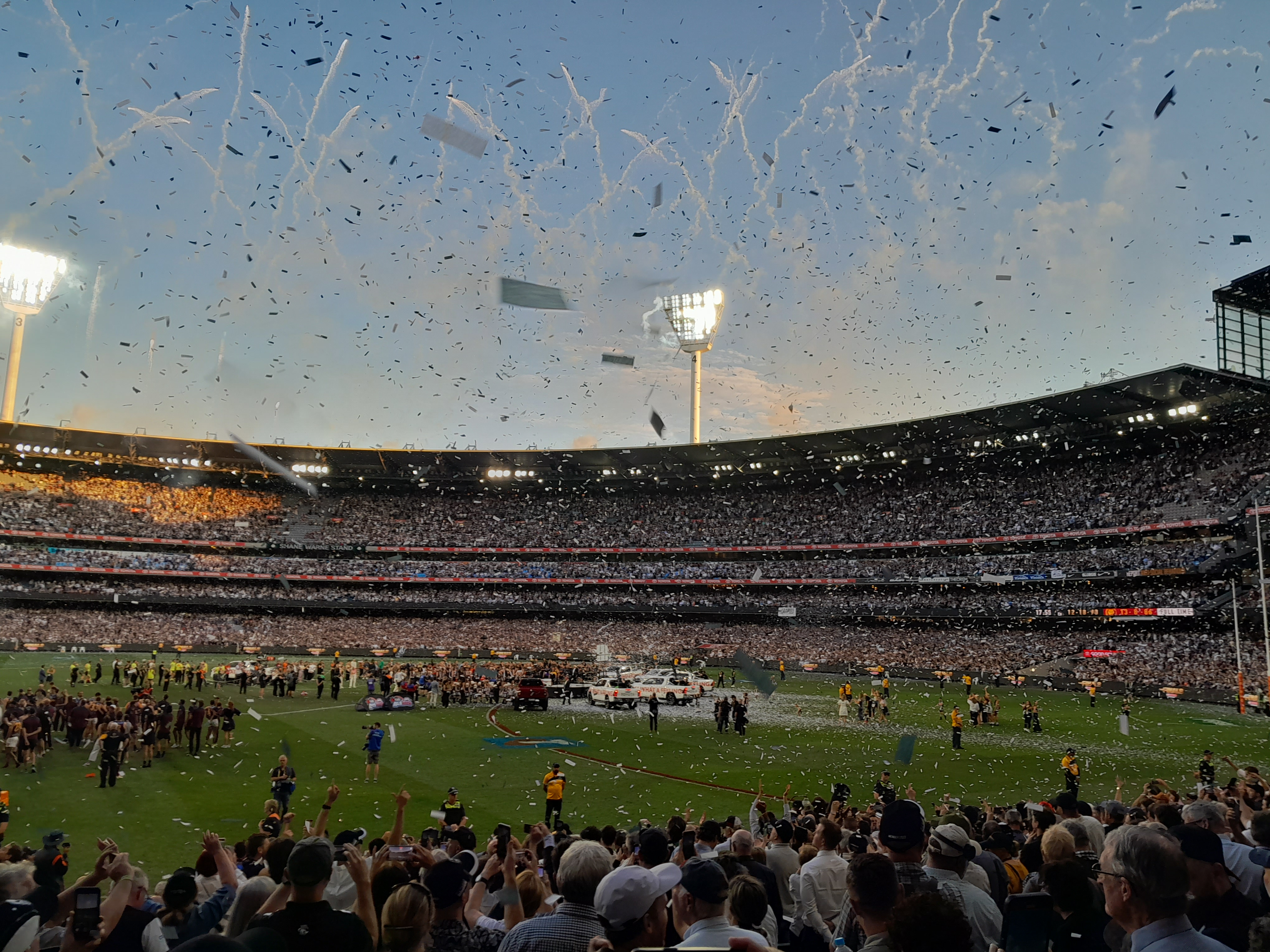
- Celebrations at the Melbourne Cricket Ground, following the post-match presentation

Collingwood	Brisbane Lions
12.18 (90)	13.8 (86)
	1	2	3	4
COL	4.4 (28)	9.9 (63)	10.15 (75)	12.18 (90)
BL	3.0 (18)	9.3 (57)	11.5 (71)	13.8 (86)
- Date: 30 September 2023, 2:30 pm
- Stadium: Melbourne Cricket Ground
- Attendance: 100,024
- Favourite: Collingwood
- Umpires: Matt Stevic, Hayden Gavine, Simon Meredith, Robert Findlay
- Coin toss won by: Brisbane Lions
- Kicked toward: Punt Road

Ceremonies
- Pre-match entertainment: Kiss; William Barton & Jess Hitchcock; Mike Brady
- National anthem: Kate Miller-Heidke
- Halftime show: Mark Seymour & The Undertow with Kate Miller-Heidke

Accolades
- Norm Smith Medallist: Bobby Hill
- Jock McHale Medallist: Craig McRae

Broadcast in Australia
- Network: Seven Network

The 2023 AFL Grand Final was an Australian rules football match contested between the Collingwood Football Club and the Brisbane Lions at the Melbourne Cricket Ground on Saturday, 30 September 2023. It was the 128th annual grand final of the Australian Football League (AFL), staged to determine the premiers for the 2023 AFL season. The match, attended by a capacity crowd of 100,024 spectators, was won by Collingwood by a margin of four points, marking the club's sixteenth VFL/AFL premiership and tying the record held jointly by Carlton and Essendon. Collingwood's Bobby Hill won the Norm Smith Medal as the player judged best on ground.

== Background ==
Collingwood came into the 2023 season after a one-point 2022 preliminary final loss to the Sydney Swans. They finished the season on top of the ladder in 2023 with an 18–5 win–loss record to claim the minor premiership for the twentieth time. They defeated Melbourne by seven points in the first qualifying final to progress to another preliminary final in which, in another close game, they defeated Greater Western Sydney by one point. Collingwood's last grand final appearance was the 2018 AFL Grand Final, which they lost to West Coast by five points.

Brisbane also came into the 2023 season after a 2022 preliminary final loss, in their case being comprehensively beaten by eventual premiers Geelong by 71 points. They qualified for the finals with a 17–6 win–loss record, finishing second on the ladder for the third time in five seasons. They beat Port Adelaide by 48 points in the second qualifying final to advance into another preliminary final, in which they came from five goals down in the first quarter to defeat Carlton by 16 points to make their first grand final appearance since the 2004 AFL Grand Final against Port Adelaide.

Collingwood was aiming to win its sixteenth flag to equal Carlton and Essendon for the most premierships in VFL/AFL history and win its first premiership since 2010. Brisbane was aiming to win its fourth flag after winning three in a row in 2001, 2002 and 2003. This was the third grand final meeting between Collingwood and Brisbane, the two clubs having met in 2002 and 2003. In the 2023 home-and-away season, Brisbane beat Collingwood both home and away, defeating them 18.8 (116) to 11.17 (83) in round 4 at the Gabba, and then 19.10 (124) to 15.10 (100) in round 23 at Marvel Stadium.

Collingwood opened as a slight favourite, with bookmakers offering odds of $1.77 for a Collingwood victory against Brisbane at $2.10 on the Monday before the match, and they quickly steadied to $1.75–$2.25 until the start of the match. Brisbane's Lachie Neale won the 2023 Brownlow Medal in the week leading up to the game.

== Entertainment ==
Around 1:40pm, US rock band Kiss performed on-stage as the main pre-game entertainment, with support being provided by Indigenous performers William Barton and Jess Hitchcock. As per tradition, Mike Brady also performed before the match.

The staging and production for Kiss was purportedly the biggest at an Australian sporting event ever outside of the Olympics and Commonwealth Games. The concert featured hundreds of children in Kiss make-up as well as elaborately coordinated pyrotechnics. Kiss's performance was generally well received by fans and critics, which included hits "I Was Made for Lovin' You", "Shout It Out Loud" and "Rock and Roll All Nite", although broadcaster Channel 7 was criticised for inadvertently cutting away from the guitar smash at the end of Kiss's set.

The half-time show featured Mark Seymour & The Undertow as well as Australian singer Kate Miller-Heidke, who, prior to the match, also performed the national anthem.

Scheduled on-field events
Time	Event
9:35 am	AFL Grand Final curtain-raiser: AFL Futures Match
12:38 pm	AFL Grand Final Sprint—won by Max Holmes of Geelong
1:30 pm	AFL Grand Final motorcade
1:36 pm	Mike Brady performs "Up There Cazaly" (Note: In his rendition, Brady honoured AFL Legend Ron Barassi, who had died earlier that month.)
1:42 pm	KISS performs
2:13 pm	Teams enter the ground
2:24 pm	Delivery of the premiership cup by Josh P. Kennedy
2:25 pm	Welcome to Country—Wurundjeri Elder Uncle Colin Hunter Jr.
2:26 pm	The Australian National Anthem performed by Kate Miller-Heidke
2:30 pm	Game starts
Half time	Half-time entertainment: Mark Seymour & The Undertow with Kate Miller-Heidke

All times are in Australian Eastern Standard Time (GMT +10)

As their respective premiership cup ambassadors, Collingwood chose Peter Moore, the 1979 Brownlow Medalist with the club, while Brisbane chose Leigh Matthews, who coached the club to its three-peat from 2001 to 2003. Collingwood's win meant that Moore presented the trophy to his son Darcy, who was Collingwood's captain, in the post-match ceremony. Mark Thompson presented Craig McRae with the Jock McHale Medal for being the winning coach.

== Match summary ==
The match was played in sunny and very warm conditions, reaching 29.7 °C (85.5 °F). There was a capacity crowd of 100,024 spectators, matching the 2022 AFL Grand Final.

=== First quarter ===
Brisbane won the toss and kicked to the Punt Road end. Collingwood controlled the first seven minutes of play, recording the first four inside-50s and most early clearances. Nick Daicos scored the opening goal for Collingwood in the 5th minute after receiving a free kick after being tackled high by Ryan Lester. Collingwood won the ensuing centre clearance, with Beau McCreery passing to Bobby Hill on the lead, who took a mark and kicked a goal.

Brisbane kicked the next three goals: Zac Bailey kicked the first in the 11th minute, Lincoln McCarthy kicked the second in the 20th minute, and a second goal to Bailey gave Brisbane the lead for the first time in the 25th minute. Both of Bailey's goals were spectacular: the first came on the run near the boundary line at the 50-metre arc; and, for the second, Bailey smothered a free kick from Mason Cox at Brisbane's half-forward area and had then run forward to receive the handpass from Joe Daniher (who had recovered the smother); Bailey eluded two Collingwood players on the boundary line and then scored on a tight angle from 35 metres.

Collingwood finished the quarter with a strong hold on territory, recording the last seven inside-50s. Brody Mihocek kicked a goal from the boundary line in the 31st minute to restore Collingwood's lead, and Jordan De Goey kicked a 50-metre goal after the quarter-time siren to extend the lead. Collingwood 4.4 (28) led Brisbane 3.0 (18) at quarter time.

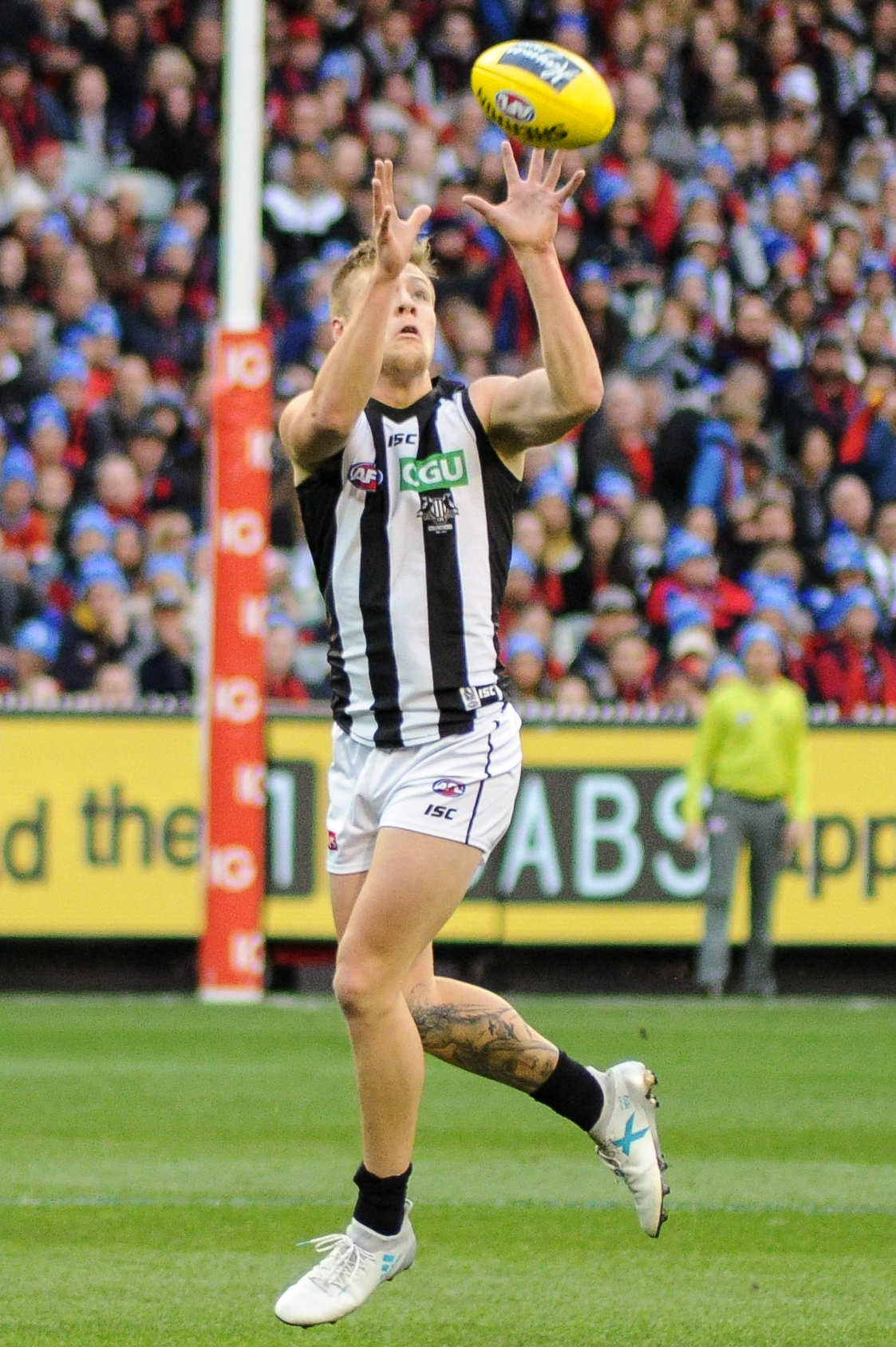
Jordan De Goey's goal after the quarter-time siren gave Collingwood a 10-point lead at quarter time

Collingwood had the better of general play and territory, with 12 more inside-50s than Brisbane; however, due to some missed opportunities (contrasted with Brisbane's efficiency inside 50), led by only ten points. Brisbane half-back Keidean Coleman was a key figure, with 13 disposals and three intercept marks for the quarter to limit Collingwood's attack and launch Brisbane's rebound, while the Collingwood midfield was in strong form.

Late in the quarter, Collingwood defender Nathan Murphy left the ground after a head knock in a ground contest with McCarthy. Although he passed a concussion test, he had blurred vision and a history of concussions, and he and the club elected to substitute him out of the game early in the second quarter. It was ultimately the end of Murphy's AFL career; he remained with Collingwood through the off-season, but medically retired early in the 2024 season without playing another game due to his concussion history.

=== Second quarter ===
A strong opening by Brisbane saw it win the first four clearances, the first four inside-50s, and score two goals before Collingwood registered a disposal: the first goal was by Charlie Cameron after only 30 seconds, and the second by Hugh McCluggage was in the 3rd minute, giving Brisbane back the lead. Hill kicked a goal for Collingwood in the 6th minute, and then Cameron kicked his second goal in the 8th minute.

Collingwood had the best of the attack over the next few minutes, but they managed only three behinds to level the scores. Brisbane then kicked two goals in the next five minutes—the first by Daniher in the 17th minute after a Collingwood turnover, and the second by McCarthy in the 20th minute. At this point, Brisbane had opened a game-high 13-point lead and kicked five goals to one for the quarter.

Collingwood then had the better of time on. With the next five inside-50s, Collingwood kicked 2.2 to regain the lead: the first goal by Jack Crisp in the 22nd minute from a 50-metre set shot, and the second in the 25th minute by Hill from 30 metres after taking a one-on-one speckie over opponent Brandon Starcevich. After both teams scored a behind, Hill scored another goal in the 31st minute—his fourth for the game—after crumbing his own spilt marking contest, giving Collingwood a six-point lead. Each team scored one more goal—Daniher from a 25-metre set shot in the 33rd minute, and Crisp from a 40-metre set shot after the half-time siren.

With eleven goals kicked in a high-scoring quarter which lasted 35½ minutes, Collingwood led 9.9 (63) to Brisbane 9.3 (57) at half-time. Hill's three second-quarter goals were pivotal to Collingwood's fightback, while Coleman continued to be influential for Brisbane at half-back; additionally, midfielders McCluggage (Brisbane) and Tom Mitchell (Collingwood) had influential quarters with several score involvements.

=== Third quarter ===
After the high-scoring spectacle of the first half, both teams tightened up defensively and played a more cautious kick-and-mark game, resulting in lower scoring. The first ten minutes of the quarter saw three behinds to Collingwood and one behind to Brisbane before the first goal was kicked by McCluggage from a mark on the wing and a 50-metre penalty against Oleg Markov for incorrect manning of the mark. Brisbane scored another goal in the 20th minute when Deven Robertson got on the end of a defensive rebound chain to kick a goal from the goal square and give Brisbane a three-point lead. After six behinds from eight inside-50s for the quarter, Scott Pendlebury scored Collingwood's only goal of the quarter at the 27th minute from a 35-metre set shot.

Brisbane scored 2.2 to Collingwood's 1.6 for the quarter, and Collingwood’s score of 10.15 (75) took them to a four-point lead into three-quarter time against Brisbane 11.5 (71). Crisp had a strong quarter for Collingwood, with nine disposals and three intercept marks, while McCluggage and Mitchell continued to be strong for their respective teams in the midfield.

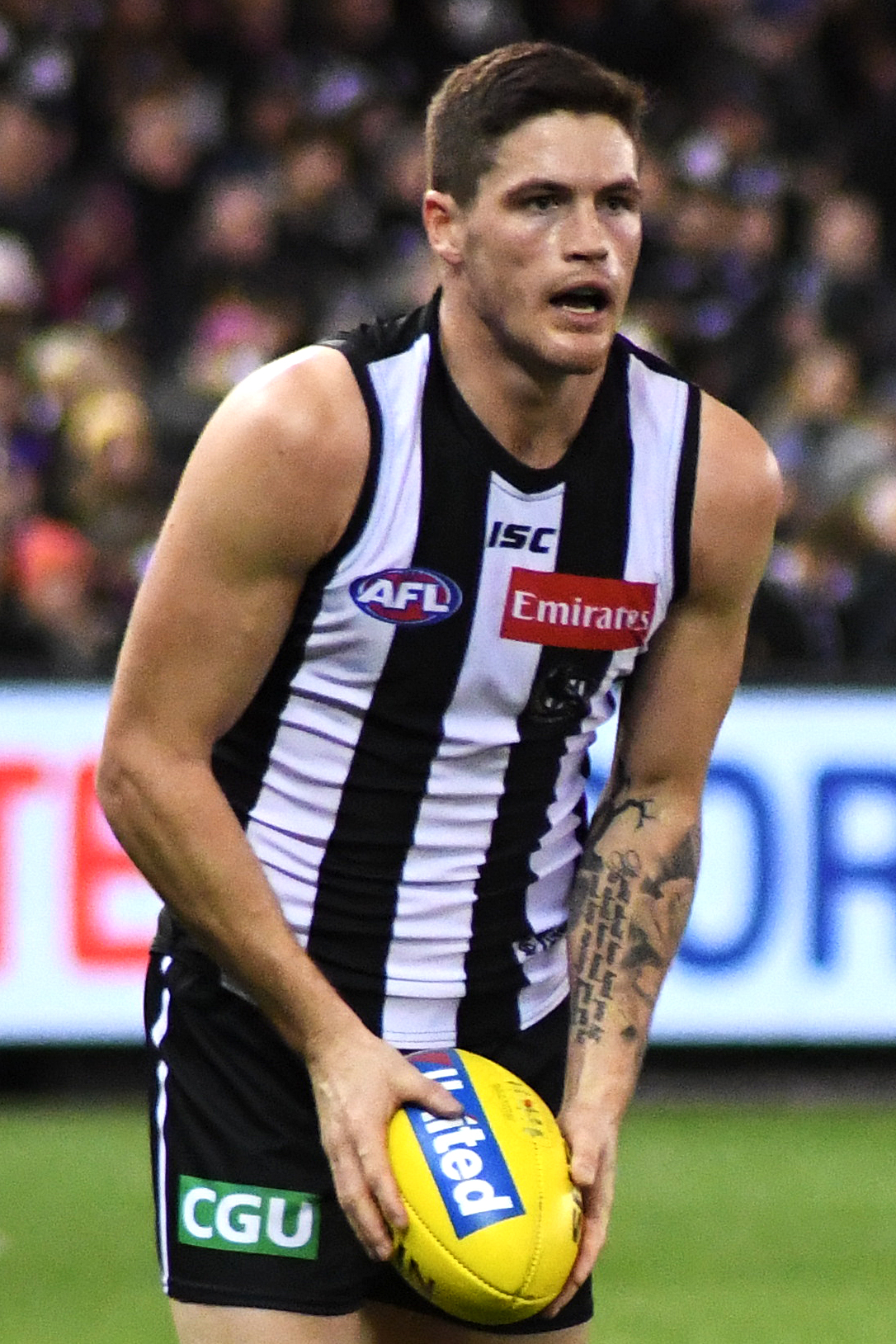
Jack Crisp was among Collingwood's best players

=== Final quarter ===
A tense stalemate ensued for much of the final quarter; it took almost twenty minutes for the first goal to be scored, with Collingwood kicking three behinds in the first six minutes, and Brisbane kicking three behinds over the following ten minutes.

In the 19th minute, a spilled marking contest in front of goal was roved by Cameron, who kicked a goal from the top of the goal square—his third goal of the game—to give Brisbane a two-point lead. Collingwood responded with two goals in the next minute of game time to take a ten-point lead: first, Collingwood won the ensuing centre clearance forward, which ended with De Goey kicking a goal on the run from 50 metres in the 21st minute; then, after the subsequent broken centre clearance ended with a mark to Steele Sidebottom on the wing and a 50-metre penalty against Jarrod Berry for dragging him down after the mark, Sidebottom kicked a set shot goal from 50 metres out.

With 4½ minutes of game time remaining and leading by ten points, Collingwood went into defensive mode and began clock management. With just over 90 seconds remaining, McCluggage received a handball deep in the right forward pocket; under opponent pressure, he barely managed to keep the ball in play and then deliver a centering kick to Daniher, who kicked his third goal to reduce the margin to four points. Brisbane won the ensuing centre clearance; and, with 79 seconds remaining, Lachie Neale received a free kick 60 metres from goal, but a quick advantage was controversially paid as Bailey scrubbed a kick inside 50 from the continuous play, resulting in a turnover, and the opportunity was lost. Collingwood won possession at half-back from a high tackle paid to Tom Mitchell at the final stoppage with 38 seconds remaining, and Collingwood ran down the clock to win. Collingwood 12.18 (90) defeated Brisbane 13.8 (86) by four points.

In an even final quarter in which both teams scored 2.3 (15), Scott Pendlebury had eleven key disposals for Collingwood, while Brisbane defender Harris Andrews—who had been quiet until three-quarter time—was influential in rebound with nine disposals, six intercept marks and one touching of a ball through for a behind.

=== Overall ===
Despite the close scoreline, Collingwood overall had the better of the game, winning several key statistical match-ups, including disposals (340–308), inside-50s (57–43), scoring shots (30–21), marks inside-50 (12–5), and tackles (73–53). Brisbane had the advantage in clearances (44–38). Scoring was largely dominated by smaller forwards and midfielders, with Joe Daniher the only key-position forward to have a significant scoreboard impact. Even though Collingwood's score tally looked wasteful at 12.18 (90), both teams were above average for goalkicking accuracy, with an expected score of 82–68 in Collingwood's favour based on the league average for the quality of shots taken at goal.

Collingwood was able to manage faster ball movement, often by means of tap-ons, than Brisbane, which opted for more methodical ball movement. There was a significant shift in the style of play after half-time, with both teams tightening up and playing a more defensive game, and with most scoring chains originating from defensive rebounds—compared with the first half, when centre- and forward-line stoppages and turnovers were the main sources of scores.

The quality of the game as a spectacle was highly regarded by commentators. Damian Barrett called it "as close to perfection as footy gets"; Kane Cornes called it "the best game I've ever seen, let alone a grand final"; and Matthew Lloyd said it was the best grand final he'd ever witnessed, later revising his comment to say it was the best grand final he'd witnessed since 1989.

=== Norm Smith Medal ===
The Norm Smith Medal was won by Collingwood small forward Bobby Hill, who was a unanimous choice for best on ground by the voting panel. Hill kicked 4.2, at that stage the highest in his career, with one goal assist from 18 disposals and six marks inside-50, including a memorable speckie in the second quarter, and he was a constant attacking threat for Collingwood. Hill was in his first season with Collingwood after four seasons with Greater Western Sydney, and he had missed the second half of the 2022 season while treating and recovering from testicular cancer.

Brisbane half-back Keidean Coleman finished second with five votes. Coleman's stats included 22 first-half disposals (the best first-half tally for either team), 23 kicks for the game (five clear of Collingwood's Jeremy Howe, who had the second-highest game total), and 585 metres gained, proving pivotal to Brisbane's rebound game, although he faded in the second half to finish with only 26 disposals in total. The remaining votes were polled by Collingwood midfielders: Nick Daicos (four votes, 29 disposals and a goal), Tom Mitchell (three votes, 24 disposals, 7 clearances), Jack Crisp (two votes, 25 disposals, two goals), and Scott Pendlebury (one vote, 24 disposals, 6 clearances).

Voting
Voter	3 Votes	2 Votes	1 Vote
Luke Darcy (Chair, Triple M)	Bobby Hill	Nick Daicos	Scott Pendlebury
Eddie Betts (Fox Footy)	Bobby Hill	Tom Mitchell	Keidean Coleman
Jude Bolton (Channel 7)	Bobby Hill	Keidean Coleman	Tom Mitchell
Sarah Olle (AFL.com.au)	Bobby Hill	Keidean Coleman	Jack Crisp
Luke Shuey (Previous Winner)	Bobby Hill	Nick Daicos	Jack Crisp

Leaderboard
Player	Team	Votes	Total
Bobby Hill	Collingwood	3,3,3,3,3	15
Keidean Coleman	Brisbane	0,1,2,2,0	5
Nick Daicos	Collingwood	2,0,0,0,2	4
Tom Mitchell	Collingwood	0,2,1,0,0	3
Jack Crisp	Collingwood	0,0,0,1,1	2
Scott Pendlebury	Collingwood	1,0,0,0,0	1

Other players among the best without polling Norm Smith Medal votes were as follows: for Collingwood, defender Jeremy Howe (24 disposals, nine marks, eight rebounds, and stepped up after Murphy's injury), midfielder Steele Sidebottom (20 disposals, one goal) and Jordan De Goey (18 disposals, two goals); and for Brisbane, midfielders Hugh McCluggage (21 disposals, three goal assists) and Josh Dunkley (21 disposals, 5 clearances), and forwards Joe Daniher (16 disposals, three goals), Zac Bailey (two goals, six inside-50s) and Charlie Cameron (three goals).

== Teams ==
The teams were announced on Thursday, 28 September. Collingwood made one change to its preliminary final 23: forward Daniel McStay was ruled out with a knee injury suffered in the preliminary final, and he was replaced by Billy Frampton. Brisbane made no changes to its preliminary final 23. Two players under injury clouds—Collingwood vice-captain Taylor Adams and Brisbane key defender Jack Payne, who had each played 23 games for the season but suffered low-grade injuries during the finals—were unable to regain their fitness and missed the game.

Collingwood coach Craig McRae became a new father on the day of the match, his wife Gabrielle giving birth to a daughter at 7:45 am on the day of the match; the baby was named Maggie after the club nickname, the Magpies.

Collingwood

Collingwood
B:	28 Nathan Murphy	30 Darcy Moore (c)	38 Jeremy Howe
HB:	4 Brayden Maynard	17 Billy Frampton	3 Isaac Quaynor
C:	22 Steele Sidebottom	10 Scott Pendlebury	37 Oleg Markov
HF:	23 Bobby Hill	41 Brody Mihocek	5 Jamie Elliott
F:	31 Beau McCreery	2 Jordan De Goey	7 Josh Daicos
Foll:	46 Mason Cox	35 Nick Daicos	25 Jack Crisp
Int:	6 Tom Mitchell	14 Darcy Cameron	32 Will Hoskin-Elliott
Int:	33 Jack Ginnivan	1 Patrick Lipinski (sub)	
Coach:	Craig McRae		

Brisbane Lions

Brisbane Lions
B:	37 Brandon Starcevich	31 Harris Andrews (c)	27 Darcy Gardiner
HB:	26 Conor McKenna	35 Ryan Lester	18 Keidean Coleman
C:	6 Hugh McCluggage	5 Josh Dunkley	15 Dayne Zorko
HF:	23 Charlie Cameron	30 Eric Hipwood	4 Callum Ah Chee
F:	16 Cameron Rayner	3 Joe Daniher	33 Zac Bailey
Foll:	46 Oscar McInerney	9 Lachie Neale (c)	7 Jarrod Berry
Int:	2 Deven Robertson	11 Lincoln McCarthy	28 Jaspa Fletcher
Int:	44 Darcy Wilmot	17 Jarryd Lyons (sub)	
Coach:	Chris Fagan		

=== Umpires ===
The umpiring panel, comprising four field umpires (the first grand final to do so), four boundary umpires, two goal umpires and an emergency in each position, was announced on Wednesday, 27 September. Appointed to his eleventh grand final, Matt Stevic became the outright VFL/AFL record holder for most grand finals umpired.

2023 AFL Grand Final umpires
Position					Emergency
Field:	9 Matt Stevic (11)	14 Hayden Gavine (1)	21 Simon Meredith (8)	23 Robert Findlay (1)	12 Andrew Stephens
Boundary:	Ian Burrows (10)	Christopher Gordon (7)	Matt Tomkins (5)	Michael Barlow (2)	Matthew Konetschka
Goal:	Adam Wojcik (5)	Angus McKenzie-Wills (1)			Brodie Kenny-Bell

Numbers in brackets represent the number of grand finals umpired, including 2023.

== Scoreboard ==
Grand Final
Saturday, 30 September (2:30 pm)	Collingwood	def.	Brisbane Lions	Melbourne Cricket Ground (crowd: 100,024)	Report
4.4 (28); 9.9 (63); 10.15 (75); 12.18 (90)	Q1; Q2; Q3; Final	3.0 (18); 9.3 (57); 11.5 (71); 13.8 (86)	Umpires: Stevic, Gavine, Meredith, Findlay; Norm Smith Medal: Bobby Hill; Television broadcast: Seven Network; National anthem: Kate Miller-Heidke
Hill 4, Crisp 2, De Goey 2, N. Daicos, Mihocek, Pendlebury, Sidebottom	Goals	Cameron 3, Daniher 3, Bailey 2, McCarthy 2, McCluggage 2, Robertson
Hill, N. Daicos, Crisp, Howe, Mitchell, Pendlebury	Best	McCluggage, Daniher, Coleman, Andrews, Bailey, Cameron
Murphy (concussion)	Injuries
Collingwood's 16th VFL/AFL premiership, tying Carlton's and Essendon's joint record.

== Media coverage ==
=== Television ===
Seven's coverage began at 9 am AEST with the Grand Final Brunch, followed by the Grand Final Countdown from 10:30 am. Pre-match coverage began from 12 pm. The match was commentated by James Brayshaw, Brian Taylor, Luke Hodge, Matthew Richardson, Abbey Holmes and Patrick Dangerfield. The television audience was 4.98 million on conventional television and 756,000 on its 7plus streaming service, for a total of 5.736 million.

Fox Footy's coverage, simulcast on Kayo Sports, began at 9 am with the annual North Melbourne Grand Final Breakfast. Fox Footy televised its own Grand Final Day coverage, including the annual Fox Footy Longest Kick, which was won by Brisbane's Daniel Rich with a kick of 69.5 metres (228 ft). Due to Seven's exclusive rights to the live broadcast, Fox Footy's coverage went dormant during the game; instead, they showed a replay of Seven's match coverage, broadcast at 6 pm.

=== Radio ===
Radio broadcast
Station	Region	Callers	Special comments	Boundary riders
Triple M	National	Mark Howard, Luke Darcy	Jason Dunstall, Nathan Brown, Ash Chua (statistician)	Michael Roberts
ABC Radio	National	Corbin Middlemas, Clint Wheeldon	Mick Malthouse, Cameron Ling, Brett Deledio	Kelli Underwood
AFL Nation	National	Andy Maher, Matt Hill	Dermott Brereton, Brad Johnson	Matthew Cocks
NIRS	National	Barry Denner, Ron Rogers	Chris Egan, Sam Duncan (statistician)	N/A
3AW	Melbourne, VIC	Anthony Hudson, Tim Lane	Matthew Lloyd, Jimmy Bartel	Jacqui Reed
SEN	Melbourne, VIC	Gerard Whateley, Dwayne Russell	Gerard Healy, Kane Cornes	Sam Edmund
K Rock	Geelong, VIC	Tom King, Ben Casanelia	Mark Neeld, Shaun Higgins	Jason Doherty
6PR	Perth, WA	Adam Papalia, Karl Langdon	Brad Hardie, Eddie Summerfield (statistician)	Jack Battrick
