= Hustwaite =

Hustwaite is a surname.

Notable people with the surname include:

- Bridget Hustwaite (born 1991), Australian radio presenter, television presenter, and author
- Campbell Hustwaite (born 2000), Australian rules footballer and captain of Collingwood VFL from 2021–2023; brother of Henry
- Henry Hustwaite (born 2004), Australian rules footballer for Hawthorn; brother of Campbell

== See also ==
- Husthwaite, village and civil parish in North Yorkshire, England
