= Keidean Coleman =

Australian rules footballer

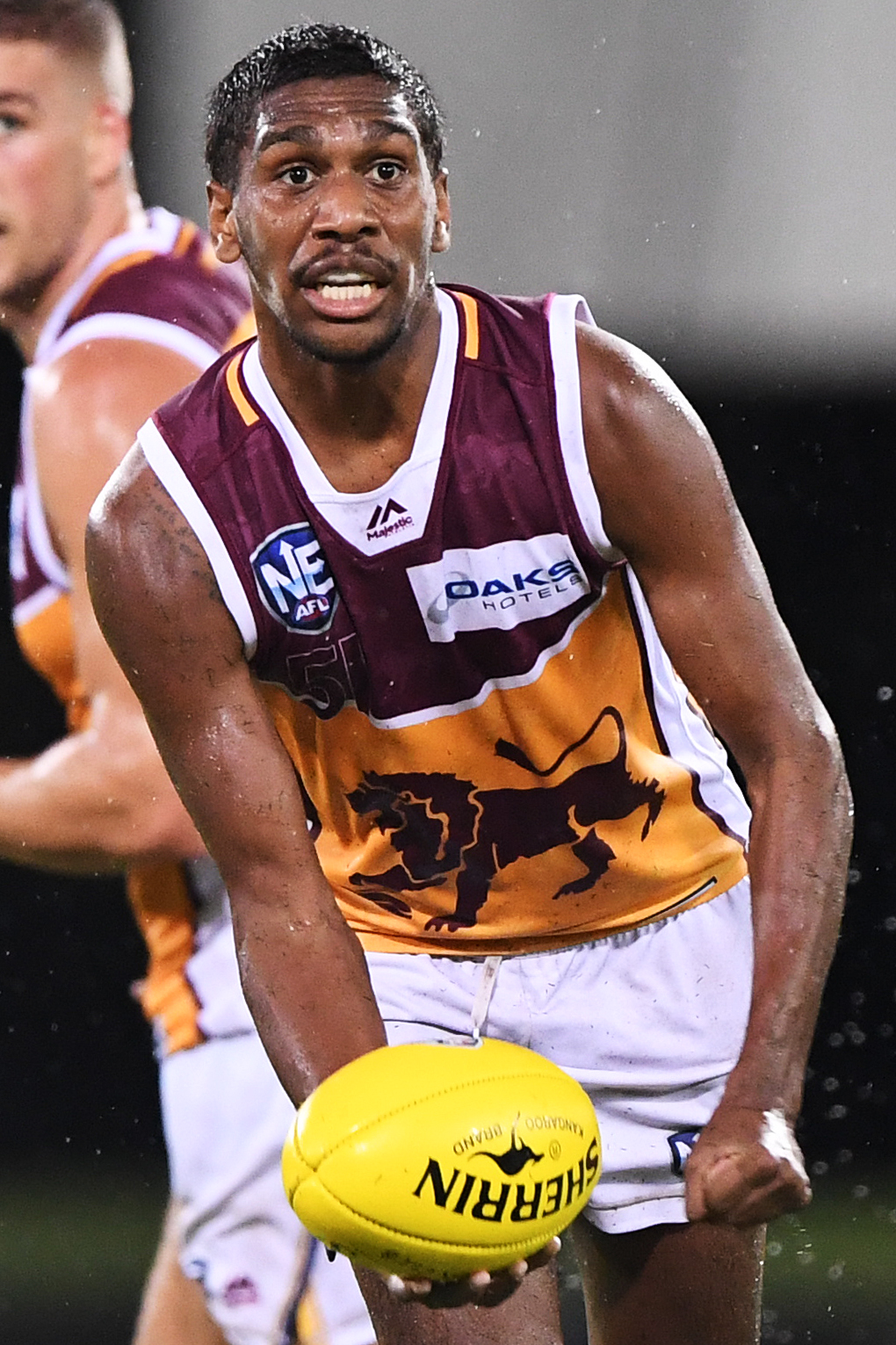
- Coleman playing for the Brisbane Lions' NEAFL team in 2019

Personal information
- Full name: Keidean Coleman
- Nickname: Kiddy
- Born: 31 March 2000 (age 26); Katherine, Northern Territory
- Original team: Brisbane Lions (NEAFL)
- Draft: No. 37, 2019 national draft
- Debut: Round 15, 2020, Brisbane Lions vs. Collingwood, at the Gabba
- Height: 182 cm (6 ft 0 in)
- Weight: 81 kg (179 lb)
- Position: Defender

Club information
- Current club: Essendon

Playing career^{1}
Years	Club	Games (Goals)
2020–2026	Brisbane Lions	79 (16)
2027–	Essendon	0 (0)
Total		79 (16)
- ^{1} Playing statistics correct to the end of the 2026 season.

Keidean Coleman (/ˈkɪdiːn/ KID-een; born 31 March 2000) is an Australian rules footballer playing for the Essendon Football Club in the Australian Football League (AFL). He previously played for the Brisbane Lions from 2020 to 2026.

== Early life ==
Coleman was born in Katherine, Northern Territory to a family of Indigenous Australian descent (Dalabon and Jawoyn) and raised in Barunga.

At nine years of age he moved to Brisbane for better education opportunities and to pursue a career in football. While in Brisbane, he initially played junior football for the Wynnum Vikings before switching to Morningside to play in the top level QAFL competition. He impressed enough to be placed in the Brisbane Lions Academy and was considered a future AFL prospect in the lead up to his draft year. However, he was overlooked at the 2018 AFL draft but decided to remain a part of Brisbane's academy program as an overage player. The decision paid off when Brisbane drafted Coleman with pick 37 in the 2019 AFL draft, matching a bid by Essendon. This in itself wasn't without controversy as Brisbane did not have the required draft points to match the bid. Brisbane had to complete many trades to facilitate the bid and took more than their allocated time by nearly ten minutes, with the AFL breaking its own draft rules to allow it. Coleman attended Brisbane Bayside State College throughout his high school years.

== AFL career ==
=== Brisbane ===
Coleman made his debut for the Brisbane Lions' 8 point win over Collingwood in the 15th round of the 2020 AFL season. On debut, Coleman picked up 12 disposals, 4 marks and 4 tackles.

Following his rookie season, Coleman saw himself in and out of the Lions lineup in place of other defenders, however the latter half of the season saw Coleman show promise. Coleman ended up playing in both of the Brisbane Lions finals losses. In the Qualifying Finals loss to the Melbourne Demons, Coleman collected a then career-high 18 disposals, along with 10 kicks and 6 marks. At the conclusion of the 2021 season, Coleman signed a two-year extension to stay with Brisbane.

Coleman fell in and out of the rotation in 2022, but showed signs of promise. In the 20th round of the season, Coleman picked up a career high 30 disposals in a loss to Richmond. Coleman was named in the Lions squad for all remaining games in the season, including Brisbane's three finals games.

Entering into the 2023 AFL Season, Coleman became one of Brisbane's key defenders and played a career high 23 games. In the Lions 2023 Preliminary Final matchup against Carlton Football Club, Coleman had a best on ground performance, finishing with 21 disposals, including 11 intercepts, 10 marks and a team-high 627 metres gained. Coleman had a further impressive outing in the 2023 AFL Grand Final against Collingwood. Despite the loss, Coleman was runner-up for the Norm Smith Medal with 5 total votes. Coleman finished the year recording 3 Brownlow Medal votes and won the Brisbane Lions Youi Game Changer Award at the annual Merrett–Murray awards night.

Before the 2024 season, Coleman re-signed with Brisbane until the end of 2027. He suffered an anterior cruciate ligament injury in the first match of the 2024 season and missed the remainder of the season.

After failing to break into Brisbane's best 23 during their premiership-winning seasons of 2025 and 2026 through injury, Coleman requested a trade to Essendon. Coleman was traded to Essendon on the final day of the 2026 trade period.

=== Essendon ===
Coleman joined Essendon on a four year contract.

== Personal life ==
Growing up, Coleman and his brother Blake, grew up as supporters of the Collingwood Football Club.

On July 20, 2021, Coleman and his partner Rylie announced the birth of their first child, Haisley Lana Coleman.

== Statistics ==
Updated to the end of the 2026 season.

Legend
G	Goals	K	Kicks	D	Disposals	T	Tackles
B	Behinds	H	Handballs	M	Marks

Season	Team	No.	Games	Totals							Averages (per game)							Votes
Season	Team	No.	Games	G	B	K	H	D	M	T	G	B	K	H	D	M	T	Votes
2020 (Note: The 2020 season was played with 17 home-and-away matches per team (down from 22) and 16-minute quarters with time on (down from 20-minute quarters with time on) due to the impact of the COVID-19 pandemic.)	Brisbane Lions	18	5	2	1	25	17	42	9	24	0.4	0.2	5.0	3.4	8.4	1.8	4.8	0
2021	Brisbane Lions	18	18	6	5	89	73	162	44	32	0.3	0.3	4.9	4.1	9.0	2.4	1.8	0
2022	Brisbane Lions	18	18	4	1	234	92	326	107	44	0.2	0.1	13.0	5.1	18.1	5.9	2.4	1
2023	Brisbane Lions	18	23	2	4	306	86	392	120	62	0.1	0.2	13.3	3.7	17.0	5.2	2.7	3
2024	Brisbane Lions	18	1	0	0	6	2	8	4	0	0.0	0.0	6.0	2.0	8.0	4.0	0.0	0
2025	Brisbane Lions	18	1	0	0	13	6	19	6	1	0.0	0.0	13.0	6.0	19.0	6.0	1.0	0
2026	Brisbane Lions	18	13	2	0	155	56	211	70	16	0.2	0.0	11.9	4.3	16.2	5.4	1.2	0
Career			79	16	11	828	332	1160	360	179	0.2	0.1	10.5	4.2	14.7	4.6	2.3	4
