= Bobby Hill (Australian footballer) =

Australian rules footballer (born 2000)

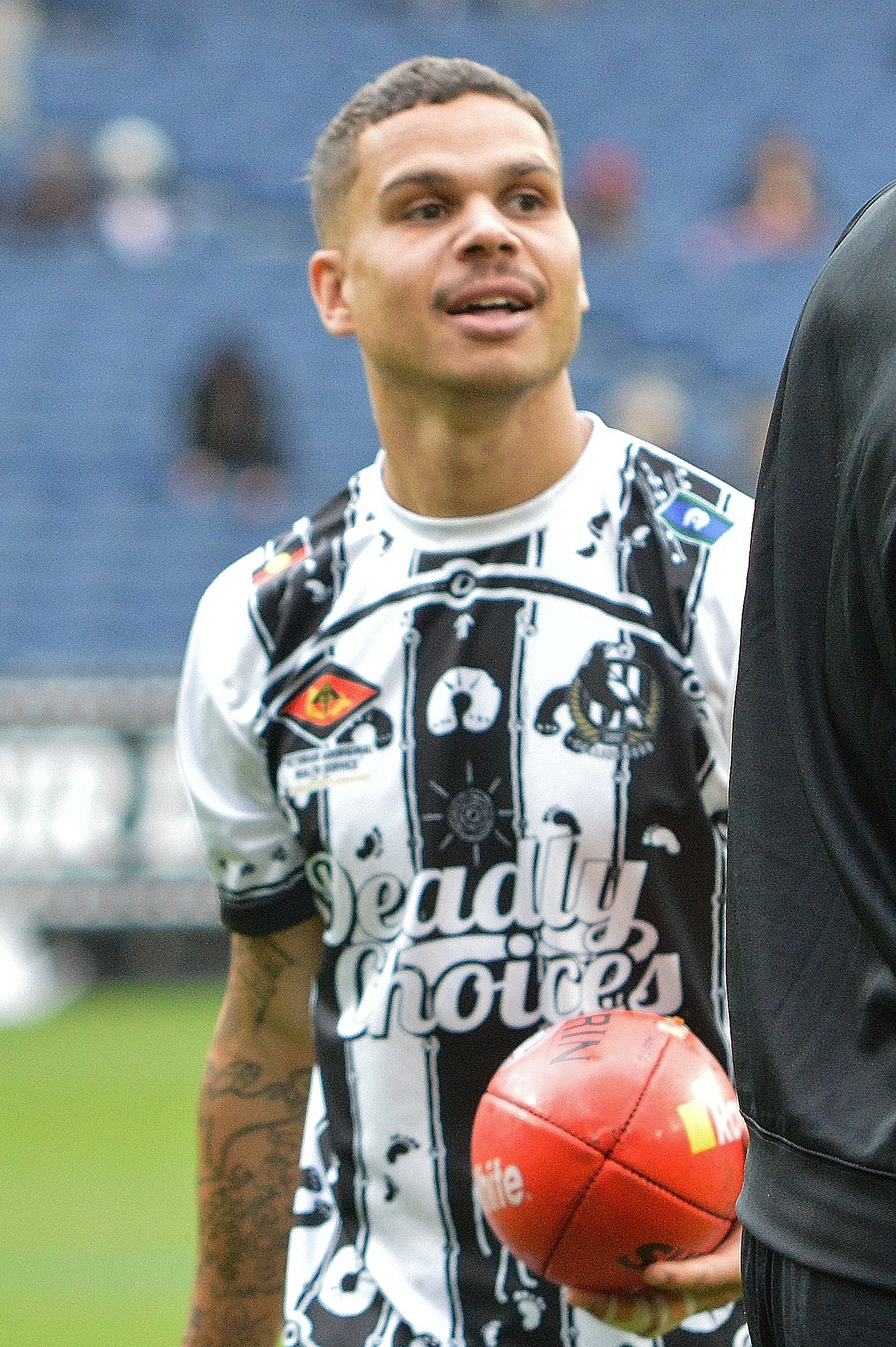
- Hill in May 2025

Personal information
- Full name: Ian Hill
- Born: 9 February 2000 (age 26); Northam, Western Australia
- Original team: Perth (WAFL)
- Draft: No. 24, 2018 AFL draft
- Debut: 14 July 2019, Greater Western Sydney vs. Richmond, at MCG
- Height: 175 cm (5 ft 9 in)
- Weight: 71 kg (157 lb)
- Position: Forward

Playing career
Years	Club	Games (Goals)
2019–2022	Greater Western Sydney	41 (34)
2023–2026	Collingwood	61 (83)
Total		102 (117)

Representative team honours
Years	Team	Games (Goals)
2025	Indigenous All-Stars	1 (4)

Career highlights
- AFL premiership player: 2023; Norm Smith Medal: 2023; Collingwood leading goalkicker: 2024; Mark of the Year: 2024

Ian "Bobby" Hill (born 9 February 2000) is a former Australian rules footballer who played for Greater Western Sydney and Collingwood in the Australian Football League (AFL). He made his AFL debut with Greater Western Sydney in 2019, and was traded to Collingwood after the 2022 season. Hill was awarded the Norm Smith Medal in the 2023 AFL Grand Final.

== Early life ==
Hill is an Indigenous man with Whadjuk-Ballardong Noongar ancestry. Named after his father, Hill prefers to be called Bobby. Born in Northam, Western Australia, Hill attended Northam Senior High School, before completing his high school education in Perth at Wesley College as part of their Indigenous Scholarship Program. He first came to notice when he was selected in the Western Australia under 16s.

Hill is the cousin of Bradley and Stephen Hill. Another of his cousins is Gerald Ugle, one of the inaugural GWS players. Other cousins include former Western Bulldogs and West Coast player Josh Hill, and Leon Davis who played at Collingwood.

== AFL career ==
Hill was selected by Greater Western Sydney (GWS) at pick #24 in the 2018 national draft. He made his senior debut against Richmond in round 17 of the 2019 season. Hill played 41 games with the club including a winning preliminary final in 2019, and is known for his blistering pace, clean hands and the ability to leap in the air after the football. Hill designed GWS's 2020 Indigenous jumper, which is worn by them as an alternative strip.

During the 2021 trade period Hill put his name forward requesting a trade to Essendon, but no deal could be reached. The following year he again requested a trade to Victoria, this time to Collingwood, and was traded on 3 October. The Giants trade Hill and its round-three selection (pick No.40) to Collingwood for its round-three selection (43) and its future second-round selection.

Hill played a major role in Collingwood's 2023 premiership season, and topped his year off with what was described as an "incredible performance" in the grand final, winning the Norm Smith Medal. Facing Brisbane, Hill collected 18 disposals and kicked 4.2 to collect all 15 votes to win the Norm Smith Medal, as Collingwood defeated Brisbane by four points.

Hill won the 2024 Mark of the Year for his mark at the top of the goal square in round 14 against North Melbourne.

Amid personal issues, Hill took a leave of absence from Collingwood during the 2026 pre-season and remained away from the club for most of the season, managing only 3 matches in the VFL and regularly missing training. Towards the end of the season, Collingwood and Hill came to a settlement to terminate Hill's contract, despite having 4 more years to run on a lucrative contract.

=== Health issues ===
In May 2022, Hill was diagnosed with testicular cancer. He had surgery and spent the rest of the year recovering.

== Statistics ==
Updated to the end of the 2026 season.

Legend
G	Goals	K	Kicks	D	Disposals	T	Tackles
B	Behinds	H	Handballs	M	Marks
#	Played in that season's premiership team

Season	Team	No.	Games	Totals							Averages (per game)							Votes
Season	Team	No.	Games	G	B	K	H	D	M	T	G	B	K	H	D	M	T	Votes
2019	Greater Western Sydney	37	8	7	5	49	29	78	18	22	0.9	0.6	6.1	3.6	9.8	2.3	2.8	0
2020 (Note: The 2020 season was played with 17 home-and-away matches per team (down from 22) and 16-minute quarters with time on (down from 20-minute quarters with time on) due to the impact of the COVID-19 pandemic.)	Greater Western Sydney	37	5	4	5	28	15	43	10	11	0.8	1.0	5.6	3.0	8.6	2.0	2.2	0
2021	Greater Western Sydney	37	17	14	12	113	41	154	33	48	0.8	0.7	6.6	2.4	9.1	1.9	2.8	0
2022	Greater Western Sydney	37	11	9	8	62	32	94	24	24	0.8	0.7	5.6	2.9	8.5	2.2	2.2	0
2023^{#}	Collingwood	23	24	33	14	172	75	247	78	56	1.4	0.6	7.2	3.1	10.3	3.3	2.3	0
2024	Collingwood	23	23	30	28	187	69	256	81	48	1.3	1.2	8.1	3.0	11.1	3.5	2.1	0
2025	Collingwood	23	14	20	14	85	39	124	36	29	1.4	1.0	6.1	2.8	8.9	2.6	2.1	1
2026	Collingwood	23	0	–	–	–	–	–	–	–	–	–	–	–	–	–	–	–
Career			102	117	86	696	300	996	280	238	1.1	0.8	6.8	2.9	9.8	2.7	2.3	1
