= Billy Frampton =

Australian rules footballer

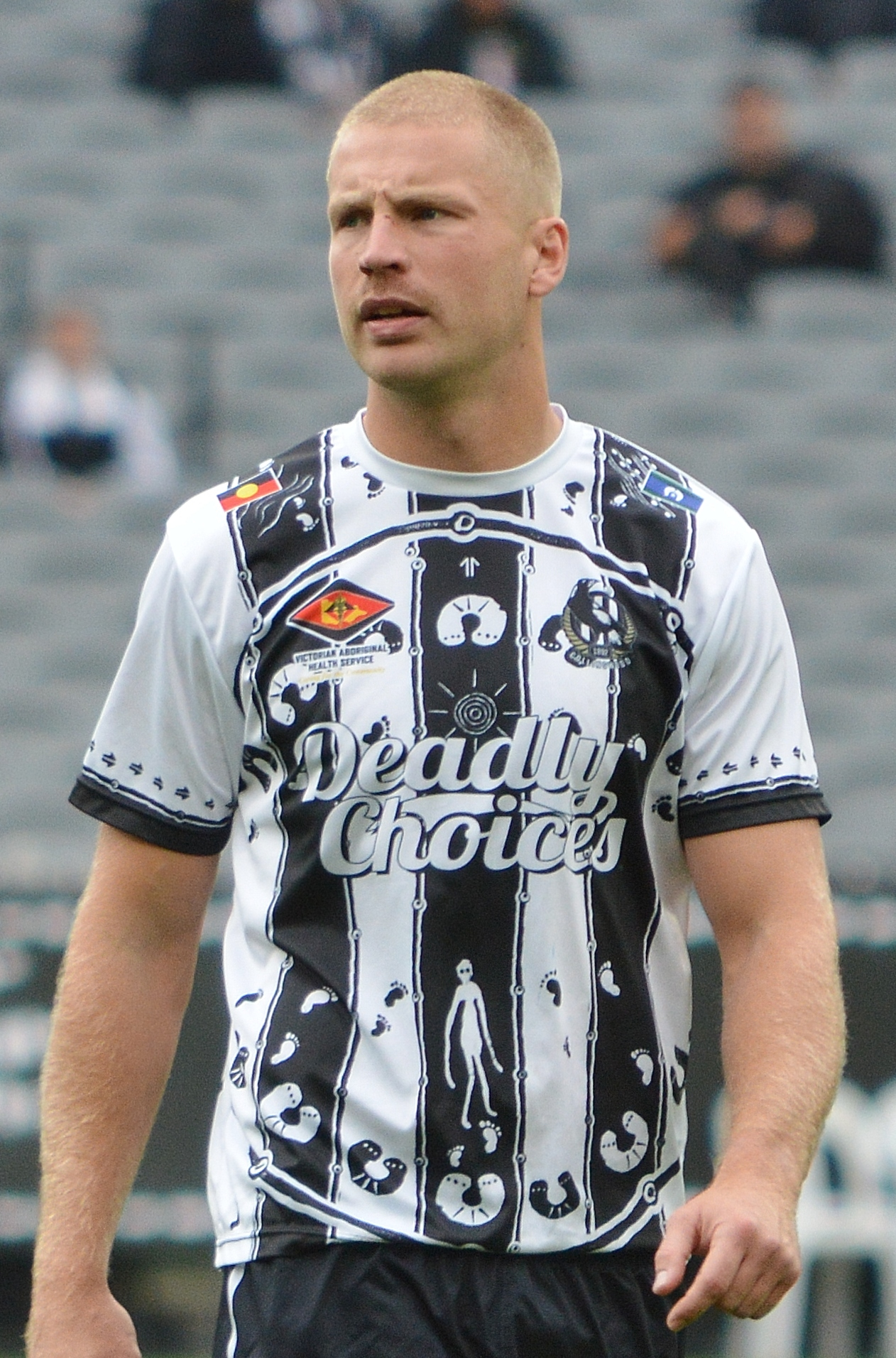
- Frampton with Collingwood in May 2025

Personal information
- Full name: William Francis Frampton
- Nicknames: Billy, Framp-chise, Chooka
- Born: 20 November 1996 (age 29)
- Original team: South Fremantle (WAFL)
- Draft: No. 84, 2014 national draft
- Debut: Round 23, 2018, Port Adelaide vs. Essendon, at Adelaide Oval
- Height: 201 cm (6 ft 7 in)
- Weight: 100 kg (220 lb)
- Position: Key defender

Club information
- Current club: Collingwood
- Number: 17

Playing career^{1}
Years	Club	Games (Goals)
2015–2019	Port Adelaide	3 (4)
2020–2022	Adelaide	21 (8)
2023–	Collingwood	74 (8)
Total		98 (20)
- ^{1} Playing statistics correct to the end of the 2026 season.

Career highlights
- AFL premiership player: 2023; Adelaide reserves leading goalkicker: 2021

William Francis Frampton (born 20 November 1996) is an Australian rules football premiership player, currently playing for the Collingwood Football Club.

== AFL career ==
=== Port Adelaide ===
He was selected with the 84th pick in the 2014 AFL draft, but did not make his debut until the 23rd round of the 2018 AFL season against Essendon Football Club on 24 August 2018. Prior to his AFL debut, Frampton played 42 games and kicked 18 goals for Port Adelaide reserves in the South Australian National Football League, gaining a following with his aggressive style of play.

=== Adelaide ===
Frampton was traded to Adelaide at the conclusion of the 2019 AFL season and played 21 games and kicked 8 goals at the club. Frampton was the leading goalkicker for Adelaide's South Australian National Football League (SANFL) side in 2021, kicking 24 goals for the season. Frampton came third in the reserves' best and fairest the following year.

=== Collingwood ===
Frampton was traded to Collingwood after the 2022 AFL season. For a few games of the 2023 AFL season, Frampton took on the role as one of the main ruckman at Collingwood due to the club's shortage in the position, and he played a career-high sixteen games for the year. After being omitted for finals against Melbourne and Greater Western Sydney, he was recalled for the 2023 AFL Grand Final; in a polarising performance, he had the worst statistics of any player on the ground – committing four clangers despite having only two disposals – but nevertheless had a positive impact as a defensive key forward at limiting the impact of Brisbane Lions rebounding full-back Harris Andrews, and was singled out for praise by senior coach Craig McRae for executing the plan asked of him. By the end of the 2024 season, Frampton had played more games in two seasons at Collingwood than he had in his previous eight seasons at his former clubs. He continues to be a solid contributor to Collingwood's key defensive six and is known for his humility, team focus and strong work ethic.

== Statistics ==
Updated to the end of round 22, 2026.

Legend
G	Goals	K	Kicks	D	Disposals	T	Tackles
B	Behinds	H	Handballs	M	Marks	H/O	Hit-outs

Season	Team	No.	Games	Totals								Averages (per game)								Votes
Season	Team	No.	Games	G	B	K	H	D	M	T	H/O	G	B	K	H	D	M	T	H/O	Votes
2015	Port Adelaide	38	0	—	—	—	—	—	—	—	—	—	—	—	—	—	—	—	—	0
2016	Port Adelaide	38	0	—	—	—	—	—	—	—	—	—	—	—	—	—	—	—	—	0
2017	Port Adelaide	14	0	—	—	—	—	—	—	—	—	—	—	—	—	—	—	—	—	0
2018	Port Adelaide	14	1	1	2	6	1	7	5	0	15	1.0	2.0	6.0	1.0	7.0	5.0	0.0	15.0	0
2019	Port Adelaide	14	2	3	2	11	12	23	3	3	1	1.5	1.0	5.5	6.0	11.5	1.5	1.5	0.5	0
2020 (Note: The 2020 season was played with 17 home-and-away matches per team (down from 22) and 16-minute quarters with time on (down from 20-minute quarters with time on) due to the impact of the COVID-19 pandemic.)	Adelaide	22	5	5	1	22	18	40	17	5	20	1.0	0.2	4.4	3.6	8.0	3.4	1.0	4.0	0
2021	Adelaide	22	10	2	11	64	33	97	50	8	24	0.2	1.1	6.4	3.3	9.7	5.0	0.8	2.4	0
2022	Adelaide	22	6	1	0	82	26	108	39	0	0	0.2	0.0	13.7	4.3	18.0	6.5	0.0	0.0	0
2023^{#}	Collingwood	17	16	7	3	100	49	149	51	19	133	0.4	0.2	6.3	3.1	9.3	3.2	1.2	8.3	0
2024	Collingwood	17	18	1	4	107	53	160	60	21	15	0.1	0.2	5.9	2.9	8.9	3.3	1.2	0.8	0
2025	Collingwood	17	16	0	0	99	68	167	69	15	3	0.0	0.0	6.2	4.3	10.4	4.3	0.9	0.2	0
2026	Collingwood	17	21	0	0	153	95	248	118	23	0	0.0	0.0	7.3	4.5	11.8	5.6	1.1	0.0	0
Career			95	20	23	644	355	999	412	94	211	0.2	0.2	6.8	3.7	10.5	4.3	1.0	2.2	0
