= Oleg Markov =

Australian rules footballer (born 1996)

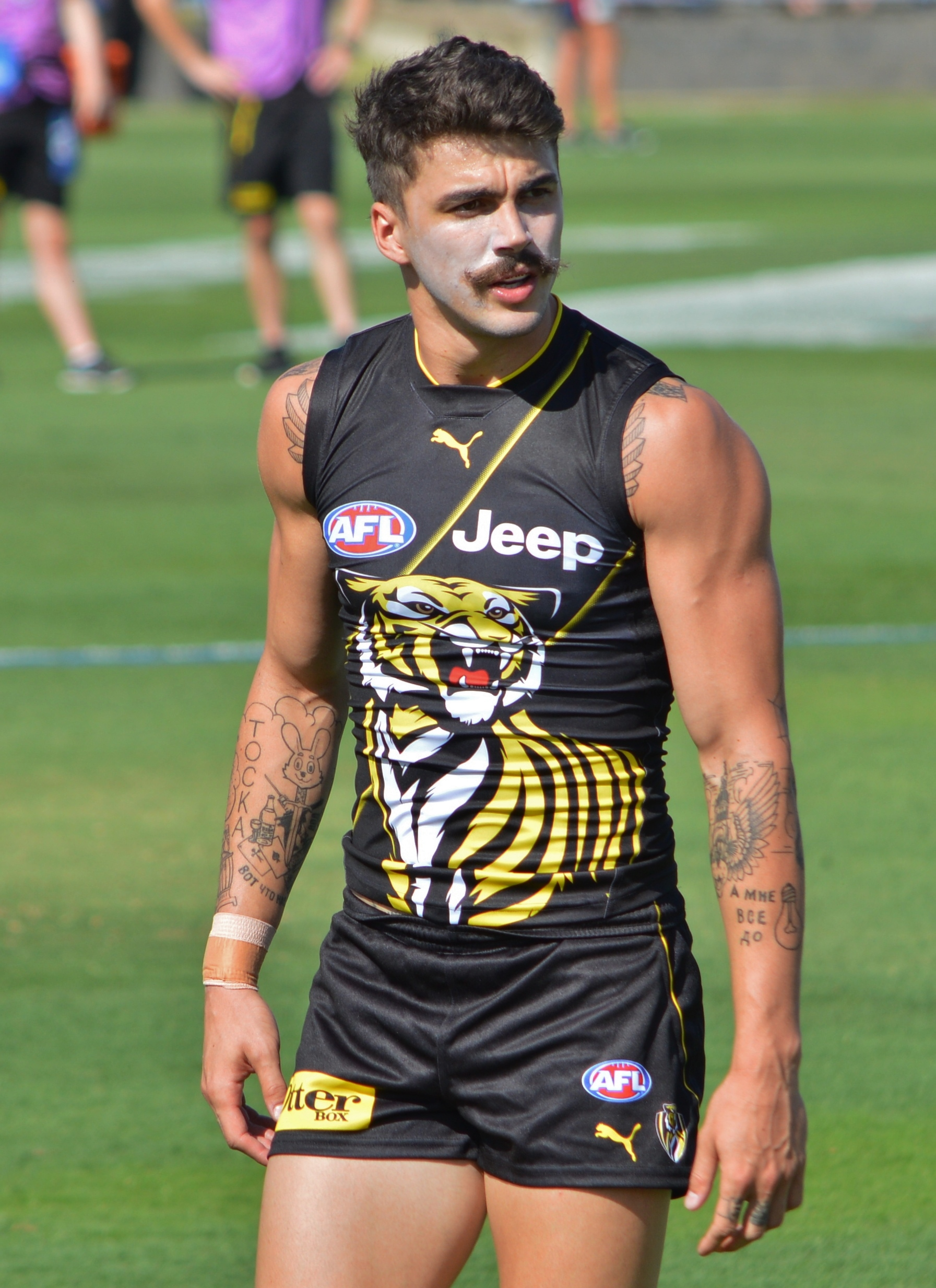
- Markov with Richmond in March 2019

Personal information
- Full name: Oleg Markov
- Nickname: Leggy
- Born: 8 May 1996 (age 30); Vitebsk, Belarus
- Original teams: North Adelaide (SANFL); Gepps Cross (NEMJFA)
- Draft: No. 50, 2015 AFL National Draft: Richmond
- Debut: Round 16, 2016, Richmond vs. Western Bulldogs, at Etihad Stadium
- Height: 188 cm (6 ft 2 in)
- Weight: 85 kg (187 lb)
- Position: Half-back

Playing career
Years	Club	Games (Goals)
2016–2020	Richmond	23 (3)
2021–2022	Gold Coast	28 (2)
2023–2025	Collingwood	43 (3)
Total		94 (8)

Career highlights
- AFL premiership player: 2023; VFL premiership player: 2019

Oleg Markov (Belarusian: Олег Маркаў, born 8 May 1996) is a professional Australian rules footballer who last played for Collingwood in the Australian Football League (AFL).

He had previously played for Richmond after being selected in the 2015 AFL draft. He made his AFL debut in round 16 of the 2016 season. He was traded to Gold Coast after the 2020 season, where he played 2 seasons before being signed by the Collingwood Football Club.

== Early life and junior football ==
Markov was born in Vitebsk, Belarus. He moved with his family to Adelaide at the age of ten months. Markov has a mixed athletic background including high jump. He was particularly talented at the sport, placing fifth one year at the Australian All Schools championships. He began playing football for the first time at age ten, picking up the sport in the playground of his Adelaide school. Markov played his first junior football for Gepps Cross before moving to the North Adelaide Under 13s side.

In 2014 Markov played Under 18's football with the North Adelaide Football Club. His season was limited however by two significant collar-bone injuries.

Markov ultimately went undrafted in 2014 and instead returned to North Adelaide for the 2015 season. He appeared in matches in the club's reserves and senior side. He played for the South Australian side at 2015's National Under-18 championships, appearing in five matches. In the second round of the tournament he kicked five goals and recorded 16 disposals in an impressive performance against Vic Metro.

== AFL career ==
=== Richmond (2016–2020) ===
==== 2016 season ====
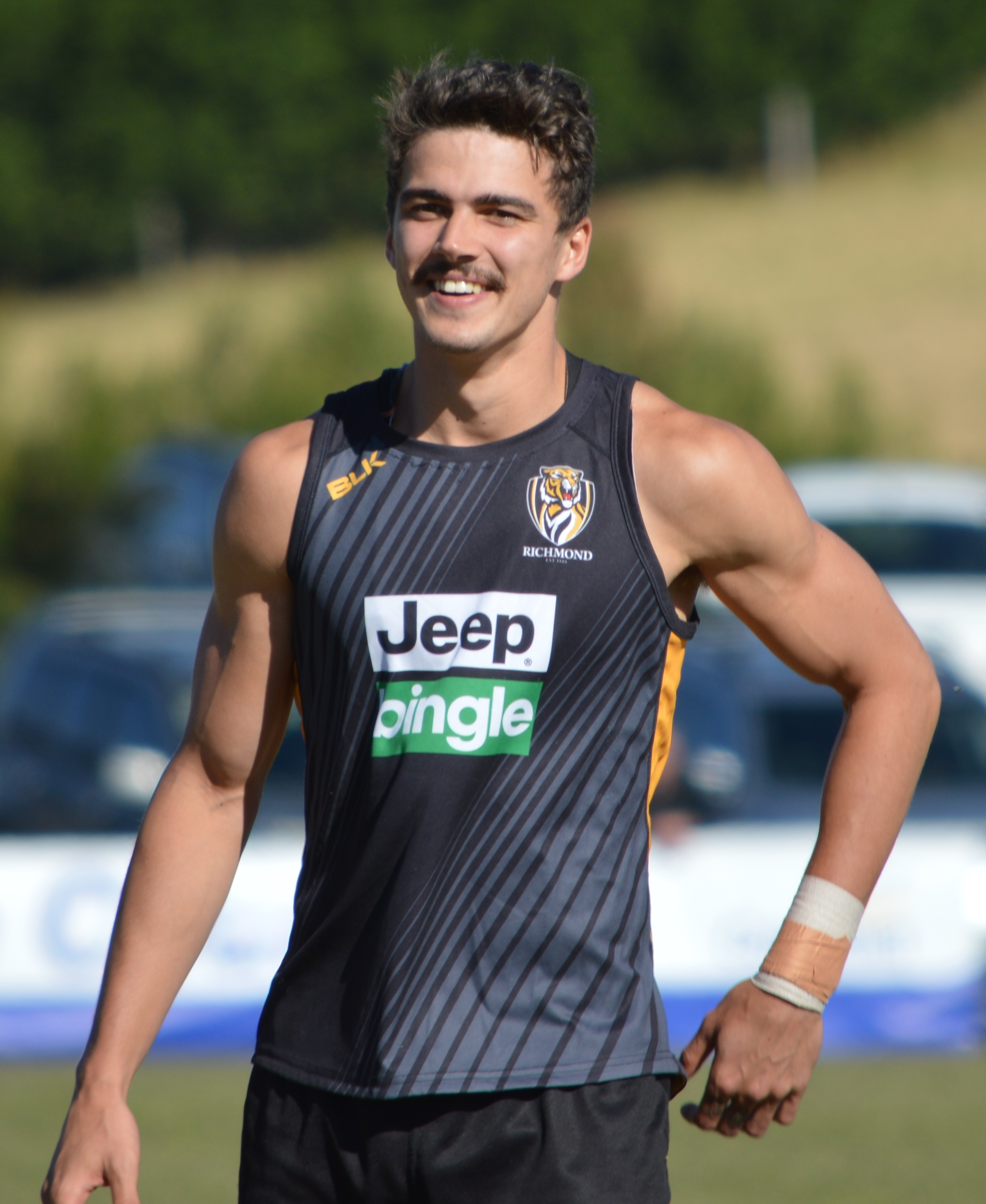
Markov training with Richmond in December 2016

Markov was drafted by Richmond with the club's second selection and 50th selection overall in the 2015 draft.

Markov made his AFL debut in round 16 of the 2016 season in a match against the Western Bulldogs at Etihad Stadium. He recorded 18 disposals and nine marks for the match. The following week he kicked his first career goal, in a round 17 victory against Essendon. Markov finished the season having played eight consecutive matches to close out the season and holding averages of 15.4 disposals and 6.3 marks per game. He also ranked ninth at the club for metres gained per match.

==== 2017 season ====
After spending the first four weeks of the 2017 season in the reserves, Markov was called up to playing his first AFL match of the season in round 5 against Melbourne. In round 6 he kicked an equal team high (and a career high) two goals in the club's loss to Adelaide. He remained in the club's senior side for the following two weeks, but was dropped after a six disposal game in the round 8 loss to Fremantle. Markov returned to senior football for a single match in round 15, being omitted form the side the following week. He had another two match streak in rounds 22 and 23, but was dropped from the club's qualifying final team to play the following week. Markov's year did not end there however, as he played three matches in Richmond's VFL finals run. The streak included playing in the losing grand final against Port Melbourne. At season's end he had played seven senior matches.

==== 2018 season ====
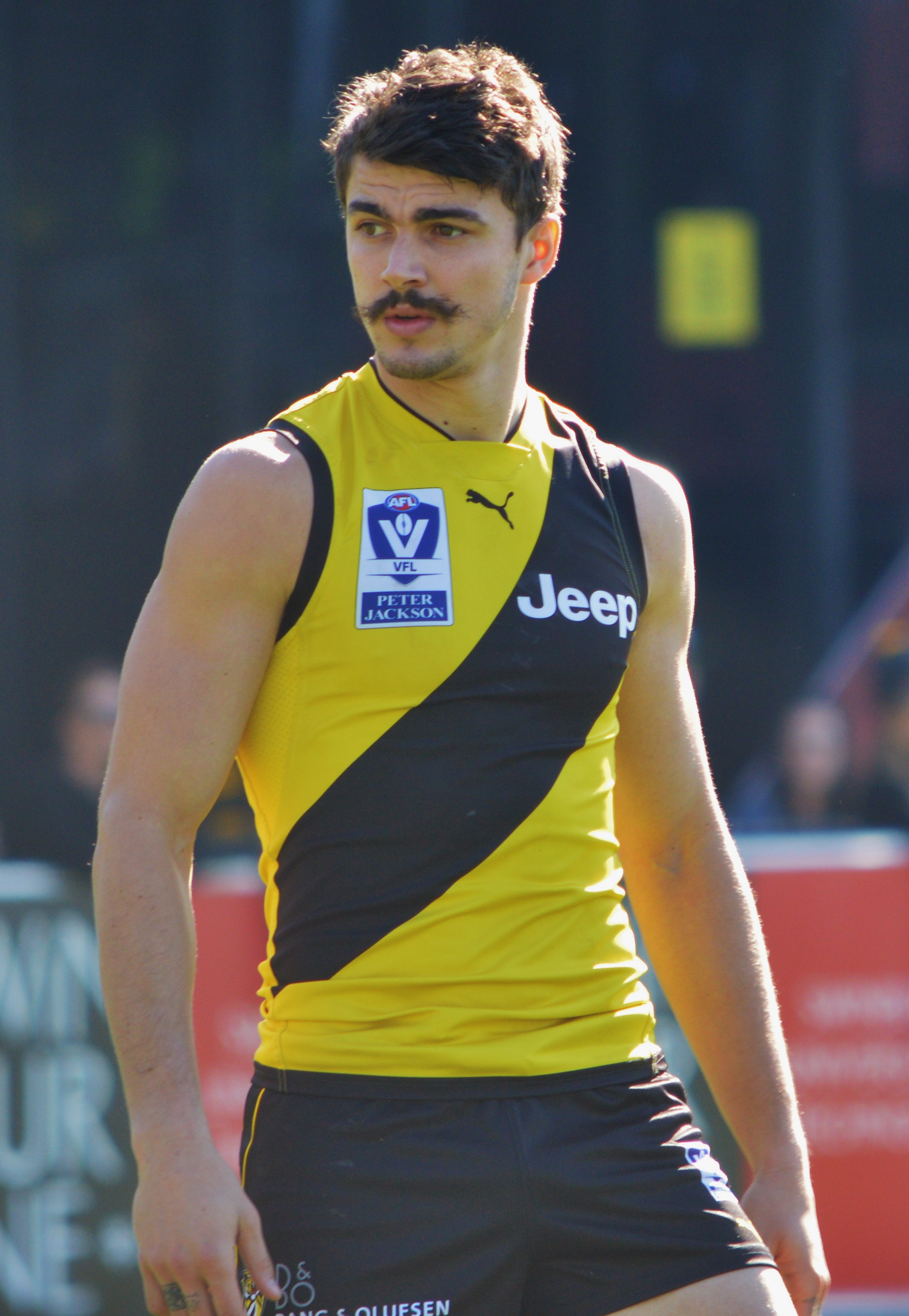
Markov with Richmond's VFL team in May 2018

In the weeks following the end of the 2017 season, Markov underwent shoulder surgery. Though he would return to conditioning work quickly, the ongoing injury rehabilitation would limit his skills and contact training into the start of the 2018 calendar year. As a result, Markov was not in selection consideration in the first month of the AFL season, instead playing reserves football in the VFL. There he sustained a quad injury in late April and missed two weeks of football as a result. After returning from that injury Makov played a further four matches at VFL level including in a new role as a hybrid defensive player, taking a one-on-one role against opponents' third-tall forward in addition to his normal half-back rebounding role. In early-May though Markov sustained a match-ending knee injury during the first minute of a VFL match against Williamstown. Scans would later reveal the injury to be a strained medial collateral ligament that would see him miss an expected four to six-weeks. Markov made a return to training behind schedule in early-July and played VFL football again in the penultimate weekend of the month. He sustained yet another knee injury in that match however, this time suffering a torn meniscus that required surgery to repair. Markov made a return to running and conditioning in mid-August and to competitive football in Richmond's losing VFL qualifying final against Williamstown in September. He recorded 15 disposals in the match and repeated the effort with a further 15 in the club's knock-out semi-final loss to the Essendon reserves side the following week. Markov finished the season having played 10 matches with the club's reserves side in the VFL but failed to play a match at AFL level.

==== 2019 season ====
After rebuilding some of his muscle mass lost during injury rehabilitation in the year prior, Markov spent the 2018/19 off-season developing his defensive skills in order to complement his rebounding abilities. In February he missed some training due to a minor knee complaint but recovered in time to feature in each of the club's two official pre-season matches in March. Despite showing improvements on his output from his last AFL match two years prior, he was unable to gain selection in round 1's season opener against Carlton. An injury to fellow half-back Bachar Houli saw Markov called up to AFL the next week however, contributing eight and 20 disposals respectively over a two match stint at AFL level. He would be dropped back to VFL level after those two matches, where he managed to play just one match before suffering a torn meniscus in his right knee. While an initial diagnosis suggested a recovery time of six to eight weeks, a highly successful surgical operation allowed to Markov to return to VFL football within four. He missed one further VFL match in early June due to illness before being suspended for another later that month. In early July, AFL released GPS data identified Markov as the fastest player in the league that season, having achieved a top sprint speed of 37.4 kilometres per hour in round 2's loss to Collingwood. He was shifted to a new role at that same time, playing as a small forward and kicking two goals in his first VFL match in the role. Markov continued to play as a forward through the final five matches of the VFL home and away season, earning regular praise from head coach Craig McRae while kicking a total of eight goals. He was quiet in a come-from-behind qualifying final win over the Essendon reserves in the first week of the finals, before kicking two last-quarter goals in a preliminary final victory over Port Melbourne a fortnight later. Markov kicked one goal for the Richmond VFL side that defeated Williamstown the following week, as the club won its first reserves grade premiership since 1997. He finished 2019 having played two matches at AFL level, along with winning a VFL premiership after 16 matches and 13 goals with the club's reserves side.

==== 2020 season ====
Markov trained as a small forward in the 2019/20 off-season, continuing the role he had played in during the final months of the previous year's VFL season. He performed strongly with three goals in match practice in February before earning selection for the club's first AFL pre-season match. After recording just four disposals, Markov was dropped back to reserves level to play in a VFL practice match in the first week March, before the remainder of that league's pre-season was cancelled due to safety concerns as a result of the rapid progression of the coronavirus pandemic into Australia. Though the AFL season would start on schedule later that month, Markov missed selection in the one round of matches that was played of the reduced 17-round season before the imposition of state border restrictions saw the season suspended for an indefinite period. After an 11-week hiatus, Markov returned to competitive match play in an unofficial scratch match against Collingwood's reserves on the same week as the AFL's round 2 matchup between the two clubs, arranged in place of the now cancelled VFL season. A strong performance there saw him named a non-playing AFL emergency the following week, though he would ultimately go unselected through a further five weeks of AFL football. In late-July, Markov made a return to half-back in a mixed-club practice match on the Gold Coast, following the relocation of all Victorian teams to Queensland due to a virus outbreak in Melbourne. That outing saw him earn an AFL recall, playing at half-back in round 9's match against the Western Bulldogs at Metricon Stadium. The match, like all matches that season, was played with game time reduced by one fifth in order to reduce the physical load on players who were required to play multiple matches with short breaks in the second half of the year. It was to be a short stint at the top level however, with the return from injury of Nick Vlastuin seeing Markov dropped back to reserves level. He was given another AFL opportunity in round 12, putting in 14 disposals and 371 metres gained in a win over Gold Coast that saw him retain his spot the following week. Markov continued to play AFL level football for a further four matches, over which time he was praised by defensive line coach Justin Leppitsch for improving his defensive and spoiling abilities. Despite that, the return from injury of David Astbury saw Markov dropped from the club's regular season-ending round 18 match against Adelaide. Markov played reserves matches over the weeks that followed, including into the club's AFL finals campaign. Though he went unselected, Markov was named a non-playing emergency in each of the club's four finals including its premiership-winning Grand Final victory.

After media reports named him as potential trade target for Gold Coast during the finals series, Markov entered the 2020/21 off-season with an uncertain future. Markov ultimately requested a trade to the Gold Coast six days after his club's Grand Final win and five days prior to the official commencement of the trade period. He had played 23 matches over five years at Richmond.

=== Gold Coast (2021–2022) ===
Markov was traded to the Gold Coast Suns on the opening day of the 2020 trade period, accepting a two-year contract and moving in exchange for the Suns’ 2021 third round draft selection. In October 2022, Markov was delisted by the club.

=== Collingwood (2023–2025) ===
Markov trained with Collingwood in the 2023 pre-season, in the hope of winning a place on Collingwood's rookie list via the Supplementary Selection Period (SSP). After initially appearing to lose out on the Collingwood list position, Markov agreed to train with Carlton in the hope of winning a spot there. However, Markov only trained a day with Carlton before Collingwood announced the signing of Markov, having an extra list spot opened up, following Charlie Dean being placed on the inactive list. Debuting for Collingwood in Round 4, 2023, Markov would go on to play every subsequent game of the 2023 season, including the 2023 Grand Final.

On 13 September 2023, after an impressive home and away season and solidifying his spot in the side's best 22, Collingwood announced that Markov had signed a new contract that would last until the end of the 2024 season.

Markov became a premiership player on 30 September 2023 in the 2023 AFL Grand Final.

In October 2024, Markov was delisted by Collingwood, with the club committing to select him via the 2025 AFL rookie draft. The following month the club selected him with the 8th pick of the rookie draft.

Markov played a further 8 games in 2025 after having been re-drafted, however was again delisted at the end of the 2025 AFL season.

== Player profile ==
Markov plays as a rebounding half back, utilising exceptional sprint speeds to set up offensive chains of possession. In 2019 he spent significant periods trialing as a small forward in VFL matches with Richmond's reserves side.

== Statistics ==
Legend
G	Goals	K	Kicks	D	Disposals	T	Tackles
B	Behinds	H	Handballs	M	Marks
#	Played in that season's premiership team

Season	Team	No.	Games	Totals							Averages (per game)							Votes
Season	Team	No.	Games	G	B	K	H	D	M	T	G	B	K	H	D	M	T	Votes
2016	Richmond	31	8	1	1	91	32	123	50	13	0.1	0.1	11.4	4.0	15.4	6.3	1.6	0
2017	Richmond	31	7	2	1	36	36	72	22	7	0.3	0.1	5.1	5.1	10.3	3.1	1.0	0
2018	Richmond	31	0	—	—	—	—	—	—	—	—	—	—	—	—	—	—	0
2019	Richmond	31	2	0	2	15	13	28	9	3	0.0	1.0	7.5	6.5	14.0	4.5	1.5	0
2020 (Note: The 2020 season was played with 17 home-and-away matches per team (down from 22) and 16-minute quarters with time on (down from 20-minute quarters with time on) due to the impact of the COVID-19 pandemic.)	Richmond	31	6	0	1	47	21	68	16	7	0.0	0.2	7.8	3.5	11.3	2.7	1.2	0
2021	Gold Coast	17	17	1	4	193	90	283	107	38	0.1	0.2	11.4	5.3	16.6	6.3	2.2	0
2022	Gold Coast	17	11	1	0	125	47	172	47	20	0.1	0.0	11.4	4.3	15.6	4.3	1.8	0
2023^{#}	Collingwood	37	23	1	2	151	128	279	83	45	0.0	0.1	6.6	5.6	12.1	3.6	2.0	0
2024	Collingwood	37	12	1	0	63	62	125	38	32	0.1	0.0	5.3	5.2	10.4	3.2	2.7	0
2025	Collingwood	37	8	1	2	32	37	69	10	11	0.1	0.3	4.0	4.6	8.6	1.3	1.4	0
Career			94	8	13	753	466	1219	382	176	0.1	0.1	8.0	5.0	13.0	4.1	1.9	0

== Honours and achievements ==
AFL

- AFL premiership player: 2023

VFL

- VFL premiership player: 2019

== Personal life ==
Oleg is the son of world champion pole vaulter Dmitri Markov and mother Valentina .
