= Oscar Steene =

Personal information
- Full name: Oscar Steene
- Born: 23 August 2003 (age 23); South Australia
- Original teams: West Adelaide (SANFL); Goodwood Saints (AdFL)
- Draft: Pre-season supplemental selection in 2023
- Debut: Round 3, 2026, Collingwood vs. Greater Western Sydney, at Marvel Stadium
- Height: 201 cm (6 ft 7 in)
- Weight: 85 kg (187 lb)
- Position: Ruck

Club information
- Current club: Collingwood
- Number: 21

Playing career^{1}
Years	Club	Games (Goals)
2026–	Collingwood	8 (4)
- ^{1} Playing statistics correct to the end of the 2026 season.

Career highlights
- Harry Collier Trophy: 2023

Oscar Steene (born 23 August 2003) is professional Australian rules football player who plays for Collingwood Football Club in the Australian Football League (AFL).

== AFL career ==
Steene joined Australian Football League (AFL) club Collingwood as a rookie in February 2023 during the pre-season supplemental selection period, training with the club since November. He played his first AFL game over three years later, on 28 March 2026, when Collingwood defeated Greater Western Sydney Giants by 33 points.

== Statistics ==
Updated to the end of round 22, 2026.

Legend
G	Goals	K	Kicks	D	Disposals	T	Tackles
B	Behinds	H	Handballs	M	Marks

Season	Team	No.	Games	Totals							Averages (per game)							Votes
Season	Team	No.	Games	G	B	K	H	D	M	T	G	B	K	H	D	M	T	Votes
2026	Collingwood	21	8	4	0	23	44	67	18	12	0.5	0.0	2.9	5.5	8.4	2.3	1.5	0
Career			8	4	0	23	44	67	18	12	0.5	0.0	2.9	5.5	8.4	2.3	1.5	0
