= Jakob Ryan =

Australian rules footballer (born 2004)

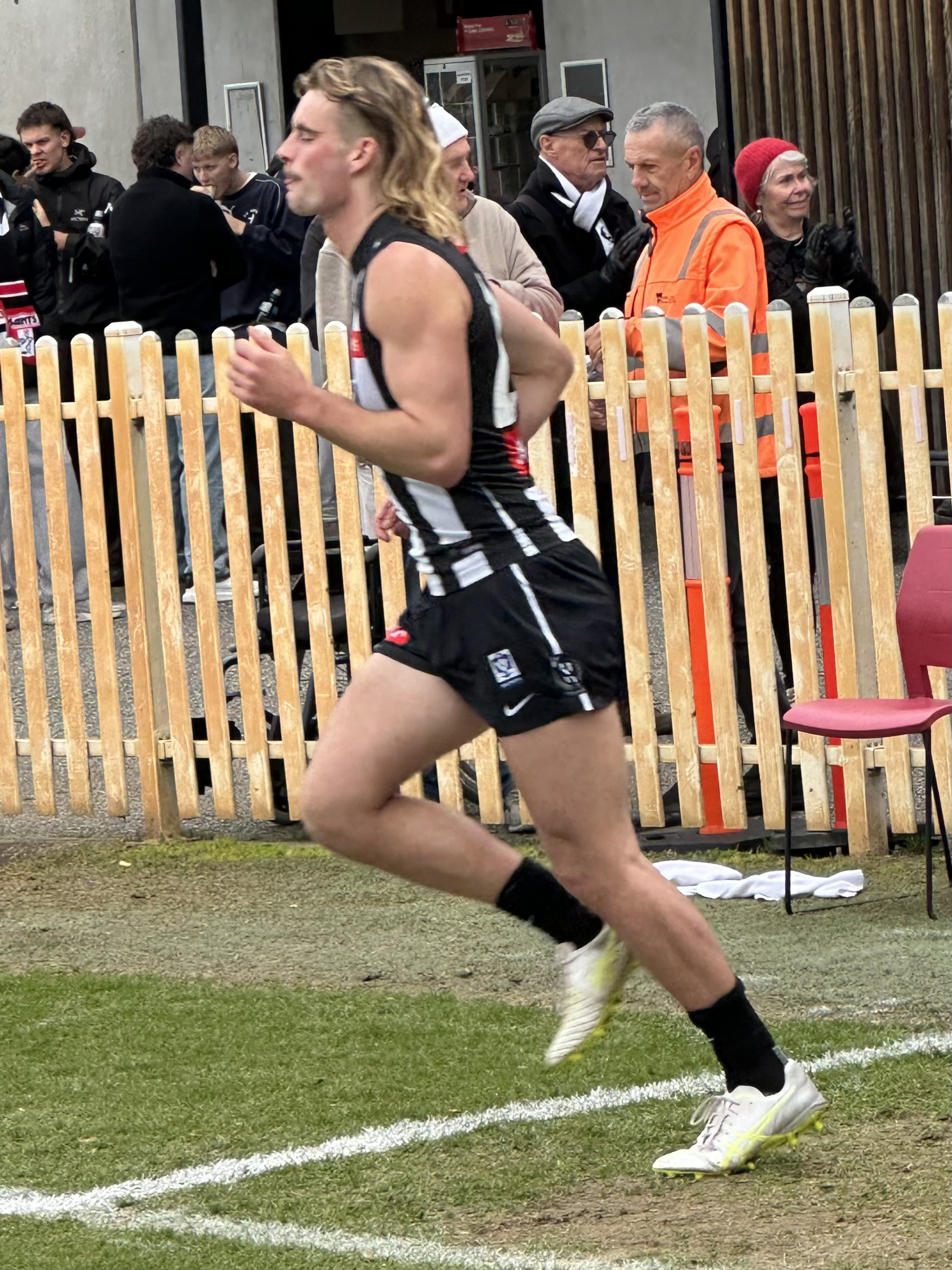
- Ryan in July 2026

Personal information
- Full name: Jakob Ryan
- Born: 20 September 2004 (age 22); South Australia
- Original team: Glenelg (South Australian National Football League)
- Draft: No. 28, 2022 national draft
- Debut: Round 23, 2023, Collingwood vs. Brisbane Lions, at Marvel Stadium
- Height: 189 cm (6 ft 2 in)
- Weight: 80 kg (176 lb)
- Position: Defender

Playing career^{1}
Years	Club	Games (Goals)
2023–2026	Collingwood	1 (0)
- ^{1} Playing statistics correct to the end of the 2026 season.

Career highlights
- Harry Collier Trophy: 2023

Jakob Ryan (born 20 September 2004) is an Australian rules football player who played for the Collingwood Football Club. Ryan was drafted at pick 28 in the 2022 national draft. He played his first game in round 23 of the 2023 AFL season.

== State football ==
Ryan played for the Glenelg football club in the SANFL. He played in Glenelg's U18 premiership side in 2022.

== AFL career ==
In the 2022 AFL Draft period, Ryan was drafted to Collingwood at pick 28. He played most of the year in the Collingwood's VFL side. Ryan played his first game at AFL level in round 23 against the Brisbane Lions. During the second quarter Ryan got knocked in the head by Lion's player Cam Rayner. He was subbed off at half-time, ending his debut game. Ryan would not play anymore games in the AFL or VFL that year.

Ryan stayed with Collingwood for four seasons, making only the one senior appearance and contributing strongly at VFL level. He was delisted following the 2026 AFL season.

== Statistics ==
Updated to the end of Round 23 2023.

Legend
G	Goals	K	Kicks	D	Disposals	T	Tackles
B	Behinds	H	Handballs	M	Marks

Season	Team	No.	Games	Totals							Averages (per game)						
Season	Team	No.	Games	G	B	K	H	D	M	T	G	B	K	H	D	M	T
2023	Collingwood	24	1	0	0	3	2	5	2	0	0.0	0.0	3.0	2.0	5.0	2.0	0.0
2024	Collingwood	24	0	—	—	—	—	—	—	—	—	—	—	—	—	—	—
2025	Collingwood	24	0	—	—	—	—	—	—	—	—	—	—	—	—	—	—
Career			1	0	0	3	2	5	2	0	0.0	0.0	3.0	2.0	5.0	2.0	0.0

== Honours & achievements ==
=== Team ===
- AFL Minor Premiership (Collingwood) 2023

=== Individual ===
- Harry Collier Trophy: 2023
