= 2023 VFL Women's season =

- Teams: 12
- Premiers: Port Melbourne; 1st premiership
- Minor premiers: Collingwood; 3rd minor premiership
- Best and fairest: Jordan Mifsud (Box Hill); Akayla Peterson (Box Hill); Charlotte Simpson (Geelong Cats)
- Leading goalkicker: Sarah Cameron; Williamstown (18 goals)

The 2023 VFL Women's season was the seventh season of the VFL Women's (VFLW). The season commenced on 25 March and concluded with the grand final on 30 July.

Port Melbourne won the club's first VFLW premiership defeating Collingwood in the grand final, a week after eliminating defending premiers Essendon in the preliminary final.

== Clubs ==
There was one change to the competition, with the Hawthorn Football Club transferring their VFL Women's license to Box Hill during the off-season, replicating the club's men's team reserves arrangement in the Australian Football League and Victorian Football League.

Due to ongoing construction work at the Whitten Oval, Western Bulldogs played their home matches at Port Melbourne's ETU Stadium.

Club	Home ground(s)	Coach	Captain(s)
Box Hill	Box Hill City Oval	Cherie O’Neill	Nicole Garner
Carlton	Ikon Park	Tom Stafford	Christina Bernardi
Casey	Casey Fields	Peter Mercoulia	Ally Kirkwood
Collingwood	Victoria Park; AIA Centre	Chloe McMillan	Caitlin Bunker
Darebin	La Trobe University, Bundoora; Preston City Oval	Kate Tyndall	Steph Simpson
Essendon	NEC Hangar	Travis Cloke	Mia-Rae Clifford; Courtney Ugle
Geelong Cats	Deakin University, Waurn Ponds	Elise Coventry	Chloe Leonard
North Melbourne	Arden Street Oval	Steph Binder	Jess Jones
Port Melbourne	ETU Stadium	Sean Buncle	Claire Dyett
Southern Saints	Trevor Barker Beach Oval; RSEA Park	Michelle Densley	Tayla Kearns; Ali Hynes
Western Bulldogs	ETU Stadium	Rhys Cahir	Mary Sandral
Williamstown	DSV Stadium	Liam Cavanagh	Erin Meade

== Ladder ==
Pos	Team	Pld	W	L	D	PF	PA	PP	Pts	Qualification
1	Collingwood	14	9	5	0	522	377	138.5	36	Finals series
2	Port Melbourne (P)	14	9	5	0	450	351	128.2	36	Finals series
3	Williamstown	14	9	5	0	471	368	128.0	36	Finals series
4	Box Hill	14	8	4	2	444	358	124.0	36	Finals series
5	Essendon	14	8	5	1	404	387	104.4	34	Finals series
6	Carlton	14	8	6	0	526	349	150.7	32	Finals series
7	Southern Saints	14	8	6	0	365	334	109.3	32	
8	Geelong Cats	14	7	6	1	402	344	116.9	30	
9	North Melbourne	14	7	7	0	410	427	96.0	28	
10	Casey	14	6	8	0	505	473	106.8	24	
11	Western Bulldogs	14	3	11	0	414	488	84.8	12	
12	Darebin	14	0	14	0	188	845	22.2	0	

Source: AFL.com.au
Rules for classification: 1) points; 2) percentage; 3) number of points for.
(P) Premiers

== Finals series ==
Match-ups set using the second McIntyre final six system.

Qualifying final
9 July, Victoria Park
1	Collingwood	7.6 (48)
2	Port Melbourne	3.4 (22)
Elimination finals
9 July, DSV Stadium
3	Williamstown	2.6 (18)
6	Carlton	3.4 (22)
8 July, Box Hill City Oval
4	Box Hill	3.3 (21)
5	Essendon	4.7 (31)

Semi-finals
15 July, Victoria Park
Collingwood	3.4 (22)
Essendon	2.6 (18)
16 July, ETU Stadium
Port Melbourne	5.7 (37)
Carlton	5.6 (36)

Preliminary final
23 July, ETU Stadium
Essendon	1.5 (11)
Port Melbourne	6.5 (41)

Grand final
30 July, ETU Stadium
Collingwood	3.5 (23)
Port Melbourne	5.5 (35)

=== Qualifying and elimination finals ===
	Qualifying final
Sunday, 9 July (11:00 am)	Collingwood 7.6 (48)	def.	Port Melbourne 3.4 (22)	Victoria Park	Report

	Elimination finals
Saturday, 8 July (11:00 am)	Box Hill 3.3 (21)	def. by	Essendon 4.7 (31)	Box Hill City Oval	Report
Sunday, 9 July (4:30 pm)	Williamstown 2.6 (18)	def. by	Carlton 3.4 (22)	DSV Stadium	Report

=== Semi finals ===
	Semi finals
Saturday, 15 July (1:00pm)	Collingwood 3.4 (22)	def.	Essendon 2.6 (18)	Victoria Park	Report
Sunday, 16 July (12:00pm)	Port Melbourne 5.7 (37)	def.	Carlton 5.6 (36)	ETU Stadium	Report

=== Preliminary final ===
	Preliminary final
Sunday, 23 July (2:00pm)	Essendon 1.5 (11)	def. by	Port Melbourne 6.5 (41)	ETU Stadium	Report

=== Grand Final ===
2023 VFLW Grand Final
Sunday, 30 July (12:10pm)	Collingwood	def. by	Port Melbourne	ETU Stadium	Report
1.0 (6); 2.4 (16); 3.4 (22); 3.5 (23)	Q1; Q2; Q3; Final	2.2 (14); 3.2 (20); 4.2 (26); 5.5 (35)	Lisa Hardeman Medal: Lauren Caruso (Port Melbourne); Television broadcast: Seven Network
Nikolitsis 2, Sargent	Goals	Wilson, Frew, Bromage, Borg, Alomes
Bates, Nikolitsis, Zander, Busch, Hales, Caris, Ricardo	Best	Caruso, McKellar, Whitehead, Harley, Stutt, Williams, Borg, Hartog, Bromage

== Awards ==
- Lambert–Pearce Medal (Best and Fairest): Jordan Mifsud (Box Hill), Akayla Peterson (Box Hill), Charlotte Simpson (Geelong Cats)
- Rohenna Young Medal (Leading Goal kicker): Sarah Cameron (Williamstown) – 18 goals
- Debbie Lee Medal (Rising Star): Charlotte Simpson (Geelong Cats)
- Coaches MVP: Jessica Bates (Collingwood)
- Coach of the Year: Sean Buncle (Port Melbourne)
- Lisa Hardeman Medal (Best on ground VFL Women's Grand Final): Lauren Caruso (Port Melbourne)

2023 VFL Women's Team of the Year
B:	Emily Eaves (Williamstown	Sophie Molan (Essendon)	
HB:	Lauren Caruso (Port Melbourne)	Tessa Boyd (Southern Saints)	Ciara Fitzgerald (North Melbourne)
C:	Winnie Laing (Southern Saints)	Charlotte Simpson (Geelong Cats)	Audrey Rhodes (North Melbourne)
HF:	Dominique Carbone (Western Bulldogs)	Nyakoat Dojiok (Collingwood)	Jordan Mifsud (Box Hill)
F:	Maddie Boyd (Box Hill)	Sarah Cameron (Williamstown)	
Foll:	Jorja Borg (Western Bulldogs)	Jessica Bates (c) (Collingwood)	Madeleine Di Cosmo (Carlton)
Int:	Shannon Danckert (Casey)	Kaitlyn O'Keefe (Port Melbourne)	Akayla Peterson (Box Hill)
Int:	Ashlee Thorneycroft (Carlton)	Sharnie Whiting (Williamstown)	
Coach:	Sean Buncle (Port Melbourne)		

=== Club best and fairest winners ===
Club	Best & Fairest	Ref
Box Hill	Jordan Mifsud	
Carlton	Maddie Di Cosmo	
Carlton	Ashlee Thorneycroft	
Casey	Shree Fairchild	
Collingwood	Jessica Bates	
Darebin	Angelica Gogos	
Essendon	Sophie Molan	
Geelong Cats	Charlotte Simpson	
North Melbourne	Audrey Rhodes	
Port Melbourne	Lauren Caruso	
Southern Saints	Winnie Laing	
Western Bulldogs	Dominique Carbone	
Western Bulldogs	Jorja Borg	
Williamstown	Emily Eaves	
