= Lincoln McCarthy =

Australian rules footballer

Personal information
- Full name: Lincoln McCarthy
- Born: 22 October 1993 (age 33)
- Original teams: Bordertown (KNTFL), Glenelg (SANFL)
- Draft: No. 66, 2011 national draft
- Height: 178 cm (5 ft 10 in)
- Weight: 81 kg (179 lb)
- Position: Forward

Club information
- Current club: Brisbane Lions
- Number: 11

Playing career^{1}
Years	Club	Games (Goals)
2012–2018	Geelong	29 (25)
2019–	Brisbane Lions	130 (148)
Total		159 (173)
- ^{1} Playing statistics correct to the end of round 22, 2026.

Career highlights
- Brisbane Lions trademark player: 2021; Brisbane Lions most professional player: 2023; Signature

Lincoln McCarthy (born 22 October 1993) is a professional Australian rules football player for the Brisbane Lions in the Australian Football League (AFL).

McCarthy, from Bordertown, South Australia, was recruited from Glenelg to Geelong in the 2011 national draft with pick 66. He made his debut in round 10, 2012, against Greater Western Sydney at Kardinia Park. It was his sole game for the 2012 season; he did not play in the 2013 season after undergoing foot surgery. McCarthy played four games in 2014, struggling with a back injury. He suffered another foot injury in 2015. McCarthy played 19 games in 2016 before he was struck down by hip and groin problems in 2017. He played two games in 2018 and was traded to Brisbane at the conclusion of the 2018 season.

== Statistics ==
Updated to the end of round 22, 2026.

Legend
G	Goals	K	Kicks	D	Disposals	T	Tackles
B	Behinds	H	Handballs	M	Marks

Season	Team	No.	Games	Totals							Averages (per game)							Votes
Season	Team	No.	Games	G	B	K	H	D	M	T	G	B	K	H	D	M	T	Votes
2012	Geelong	6	1	0	0	3	3	6	3	0	0.0	0.0	3.0	3.0	6.0	3.0	0.0	0
2013	Geelong	6	0	—	—	—	—	—	—	—	—	—	—	—	—	—	—	0
2014	Geelong	6	4	0	5	24	16	40	5	11	0.0	1.3	6.0	4.0	10.0	1.3	2.8	0
2015	Geelong	6	0	—	—	—	—	—	—	—	—	—	—	—	—	—	—	0
2016	Geelong	6	19	19	7	122	87	209	49	49	1.0	0.4	6.4	4.6	11.0	2.6	2.6	0
2017	Geelong	6	3	4	1	24	16	40	6	8	1.3	0.3	8.0	5.3	13.3	2.0	2.7	0
2018	Geelong	6	2	2	3	14	8	22	5	4	1.0	1.5	7.0	4.0	11.0	2.5	2.0	0
2019	Brisbane Lions	11	24	20	13	179	135	314	70	94	0.8	0.5	7.5	5.6	13.1	2.9	3.9	2
2020 (Note: The 2020 season was played with 17 home-and-away matches per team (down from 22) and 16-minute quarters with time on (down from 20-minute quarters with time on) due to the impact of the COVID-19 pandemic.)	Brisbane Lions	11	17	15	15	89	76	165	40	53	0.9	0.9	5.2	4.5	9.7	2.4	3.1	0
2021	Brisbane Lions	11	24	36	15	183	123	306	77	80	1.5	0.6	7.6	5.1	12.8	3.2	3.3	3
2022	Brisbane Lions	11	25	35	13	199	110	309	89	83	1.4	0.5	8.0	4.4	12.4	3.6	3.3	1
2023	Brisbane Lions	11	24	28	11	188	93	281	62	72	1.2	0.5	7.8	3.9	11.7	2.6	3.0	0
2024	Brisbane Lions	11	8	8	9	74	24	98	30	21	1.0	1.1	9.3	3.0	12.3	3.8	2.6	0
2025	Brisbane Lions	11	0	—	—	—	—	—	—	—	—	—	—	—	—	—	—	0
2026	Brisbane Lions	11	8	6	3	78	26	104	38	14	0.8	0.4	9.8	3.3	13.0	4.8	1.8	0
Career			159	173	95	1177	717	1894	474	489	1.1	0.6	7.4	4.5	11.9	3.0	3.1	6
