= Josh Daicos =

Australian rules footballer (born 1998)

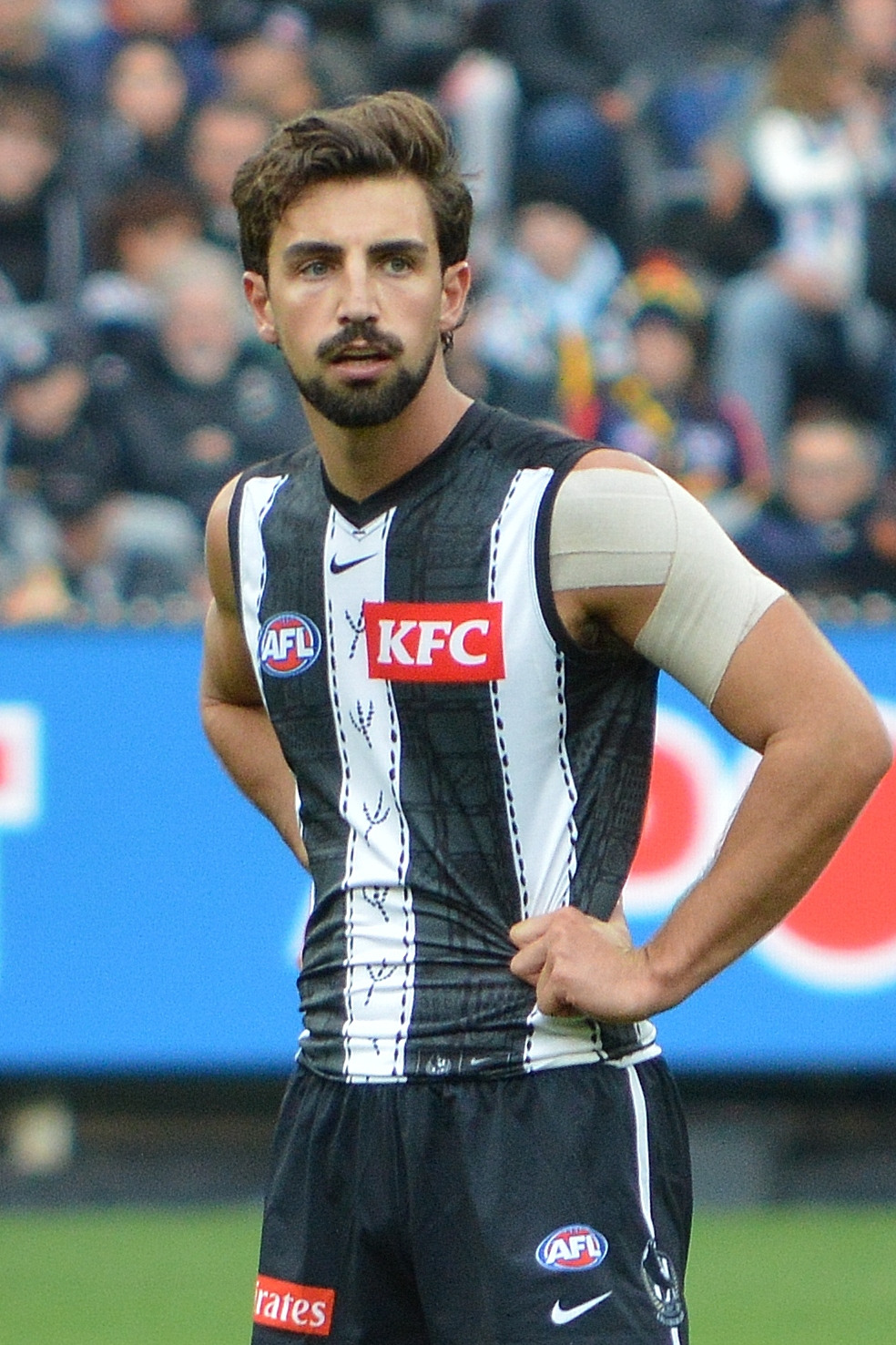
- Daicos in May 2025

Personal information
- Full name: Joshua Lachlan Daicos
- Born: 26 November 1998 (age 27); Victoria
- Original team: Oakleigh Chargers (TAC Cup)
- Draft: No. 57 (F/S), 2016 national draft
- Debut: Round 22, 2017, Collingwood vs. Geelong, at MCG
- Height: 178 cm (5 ft 10 in)
- Weight: 77 kg (170 lb)
- Position: Defender

Club information
- Current club: Collingwood
- Number: 7

Playing career^{1}
Years	Club	Games (Goals)
2017–	Collingwood	175 (68)
- ^{1} Playing statistics correct to the end of the 2026 season.

Career highlights
- AFL premiership player: 2023; All-Australian team: 2023; Copeland Trophy: 2023; 22under22 team: 2020; Goal of the Year: 2020; Neale Daniher Trophy: 2025; J.J Joyce trophy: 2024; R.T Rush trophy: 2026

Joshua Lachlan Daicos (born 26 November 1998) is a professional Australian rules footballer playing for the Collingwood Football Club in the Australian Football League (AFL). Son of Peter Daicos, who played for Collingwood in the VFL/AFL, he played for the Oakleigh Chargers in the TAC Cup before he was drafted with pick 57 in 2016 under the father–son rule.

== State football ==
Daicos played junior football with Bulleen-Templestowe Junior Football Club and the Greythorn Falcons, both part of the Yarra Junior Football League, as well as at his school, Camberwell Grammar. He entered the TAC Cup in 2016, playing for the Oakleigh Chargers. During the season, he kicked 11 goals in 10 games. He also represented Vic Metro at the 2016 AFL Under 18 Championships, scoring goals against the Allies and against Western Australia. At the end of the season, Daicos was invited to the AFL Draft Combine, along with four other players, including Sam McLarty who was later drafted to Collingwood with him.

== AFL career ==
Daicos was drafted by Collingwood with pick 57, which was their last pick, in the 2016 national draft under the father–son rule. His father wore the number 35 guernsey, which from 2010 to 2022 was given to the first draft pick every year to wear in their debut season, but Daicos chose to wear number 26 to create his own legacy. He got his first taste of AFL football, playing in the 2017 JLT Community Series, especially impressing against Essendon. Daicos made his debut in the eleven point loss to Geelong at the Melbourne Cricket Ground in round 22 of the 2017 season. He made two appearances in his debut season, before adding 10 consecutive appearances in the 2018 season. After the season, Daicos signed a two-year contract extension with Collingwood. In the 2020 season, Daicos had a breakout year, playing every one of Collingwood's 18 games between the home-and-away season and the finals. At the end of the 2020 season, Daicos was selected for the season's 22under22 team, and he signed on with Collingwood for two more years. During the 2020 Brownlow Medal ceremony, he was awarded the Goal of the Year for his single-handed effort from the boundary in Round 10 to seal a victory against Sydney.

== Personal life ==
Daicos is the son of former Collingwood great, Peter Daicos. His brother, Nick Daicos, also played Australian rules football with Oakleigh Chargers and was eligible for the 2021 AFL draft being a pick 4 father–son pick for Collingwood. Daicos grew up supporting Collingwood as a child.

Daicos became engaged to model Annalise Dalins in September 2024.

== Statistics ==
Updated to the end of round 22, 2026.

Legend
G	Goals	K	Kicks	D	Disposals	T	Tackles
B	Behinds	H	Handballs	M	Marks
#	Played in that season's premiership team

Season	Team	No.	Games	Totals							Averages (per game)							Votes
Season	Team	No.	Games	G	B	K	H	D	M	T	G	B	K	H	D	M	T	Votes
2017	Collingwood	26	2	1	1	10	12	22	4	12	0.5	0.5	5.0	6.0	11.0	2.0	6.0	0
2018	Collingwood	26	10	5	2	87	68	155	34	37	0.5	0.2	8.7	6.8	15.5	3.4	3.7	0
2019	Collingwood	26	5	1	2	40	45	85	19	13	0.2	0.4	8.0	9.0	17.0	3.8	2.6	0
2020 (Note: The 2020 season was played with 17 home-and-away matches per team (down from 22) and 16-minute quarters with time on (down from 20-minute quarters with time on) due to the impact of the COVID-19 pandemic.)	Collingwood	26	18	10	3	169	143	312	68	42	0.6	0.2	9.4	7.9	17.3	3.8	2.3	2
2021	Collingwood	7	17	9	9	173	149	322	48	53	0.5	0.5	10.2	8.8	18.9	2.8	3.1	0
2022	Collingwood	7	25	15	11	314	213	527	101	65	0.6	0.4	12.6	8.5	21.1	4.0	2.6	4
2023^{#}	Collingwood	7	26	16	8	362	288	650	120	59	0.6	0.3	13.9	11.1	25.0	4.6	2.3	8
2024	Collingwood	7	23	7	9	327	246	573	120	74	0.3	0.4	14.2	10.7	24.9	5.2	3.2	3
2025	Collingwood	7	25	3	5	423	248	671	123	57	0.1	0.2	16.9	9.9	26.8	4.9	2.3	12
2026	Collingwood	7	21	1	6	345	223	568	124	62	0.0	0.3	16.4	10.6	27.0	5.9	3.0	0
Career			172	68	56	2250	1635	3885	761	474	0.4	0.3	13.1	9.5	22.6	4.4	2.8	29

== Honours and achievements ==
Team

- AFL Premiership Winner: 2023 (Collingwood)
- AFL Minor Premiership: 2023 (Collingwood)

Individual

- All-Australian team: 2023
- AFL Goal of the Year: 2020
- 22under22 team: 2020
- Copeland Trophy: 2023
- Neale Daniher Trophy: 2025
