= 2016 Collingwood Football Club season =

Collingwood Football Club
2016 season
- President: Eddie McGuire
- Coach: Nathan Buckley (5th season)
- Captains: Scott Pendlebury (3rd season)
- Home ground: The MCG
- Regular season: 12th
- Finals series: DNQ
- Best and Fairest: Scott Pendlebury
- Leading goalkicker: Alex Fasolo (25 goals)
- Highest home attendance: 85,082 vs. Essendon (Round 5)
- Lowest home attendance: 17,644 vs. Gold Coast (Round 22)
- Average home attendance: 46,188
- Club membership: 74,643

The 2016 Collingwood Football Club season was the club's 120th season of senior competition in the Australian Football League (AFL). The club also fielded its reserves team in the VFL.

== Squad ==
Players are listed by guernsey number, and 2016 statistics are for AFL regular season and finals series matches during the 2016 AFL season only. Career statistics include a player's complete AFL career, which, as a result, means that a player's debut and part or whole of their career statistics may be for another club. Statistics are correct as of Round 23 of the 2016 season (28 August 2016) and are taken from AFL Tables

No.	Name	AFL debut	Games (2016)	Goals (2016)	Games (CFC)	Goals (CFC)	Games (AFL career)	Goals (AFL career)
1	Alex Fasolo	2011	12	25	81	104	81	104
2	Jordan De Goey	2015	20	16	36	22	36	22
3	Brent Macaffer	2009	4	1	77	33	77	33
4	Brodie Grundy	2013	21	11	62	23	62	23
5	Jamie Elliott	2012	0	0	72	104	72	104
6	Tyson Goldsack	2007	4	1	141	49	141	49
7	Adam Treloar	2012 (Greater Western Sydney)	22	13	22	13	101	61
8	Tom Langdon	2014	5	2	46	2	46	2
9	Jesse White	2008 (Sydney)	16	23	52	70	123	143
10	Scott Pendlebury (c)	2006	22	11	236	152	236	152
11	Jarryd Blair	2010	21	15	143	110	143	110
12	Matthew Scharenberg	2015	0	0	4	0	4	0
13	Taylor Adams	2012 (Greater Western Sydney)	14	6	44	15	75	27
14	James Aish	2014 (Brisbane Lions)	15	10	15	10	47	18
15	Jarrod Witts	2013	2	0	40	18	40	18
16	Nathan Brown	2008	16	0	130	7	130	7
17	Jonathon Marsh	2015	10	0	15	0	15	0
18	Travis Varcoe	2007 (Geelong)	17	6	39	16	177	146
19	Levi Greenwood	2009 (North Melbourne)	21	18	29	22	103	48
20	Ben Reid	2007	17	0	121	37	121	37
21	Tom Phillips	2016	6	3	6	3	6	3
22	Steele Sidebottom	2009	20	17	163	123	163	123
23	Lachlan Keeffe	2011	0	0	40	7	40	7
24	Josh Thomas	2013	0	0	32	19	32	19
25	Jack Crisp	2012 (Brisbane Lions)	22	9	44	25	62	35
26	Marley Williams	2012	11	0	68	6	68	6
27	Matthew Goodyear	2016	2	0	2	0	2	0
28	Ben Sinclair	2011	13	2	63	22	63	22
29	Tim Broomhead	2014	2	3	21	19	21	19
30	Darcy Moore	2015	17	24	26	33	26	33
31	Jackson Ramsay	2014	2	0	9	0	9	0
32	Travis Cloke	2005	13	17	246	441	246	441
33	Rupert Wills	2016	5	1	5	1	5	1
34	Alan Toovey	2007	8	0	159	9	159	9
35	Brayden Sier	****	0	0	0	0	0	0
36	Dane Swan	2003	1	0	258	211	258	211
37	Brayden Maynard	2015	20	4	29	6	29	6
38	Jeremy Howe	2011 (Melbourne)	20	3	20	3	120	83
39	Ben Crocker	2016	10	10	10	10	10	10
40	Josh Smith	2016	18	4	18	4	18	4
41	Tim Golds	2012 (Greater Western Sydney)	0	0	0	0	6	0
43	Adam Oxley	2013	12	4	31	9	31	9
44	Corey Gault	2014	2	0	6	4	6	4
45	Jack Frost	2013	10	0	54	0	54	0
46	Mason Cox	2016	11	17	11	17	11	17
47	Darrean Wyatt	****	0	0	0	0	0	0

=== Squad changes ===
==== In ====
No.	Name	Position	Previous club	via
47	(Victoria (state)) Darrean Wyatt		College of Coastal Georgia	AFL Rookie Draft, fifth round (pick No. 64)
38	(Tasmania) Jeremy Howe	Forward / Defender	Melbourne	trade
7	(Victoria (state)) Adam Treloar	Midfielder	Greater Western Sydney	trade
14	(South Australia) James Aish	Midfielder	Brisbane Lions	trade
35	(Victoria (state)) Brayden Sier	Midfielder	Northern Knights	AFL National Draft, second round (pick No. 32)
21	(Victoria (state)) Tom Phillips	Midfielder	Oakleigh Chargers	AFL National Draft, fourth round (pick No. 58)
33	(Victoria (state)) Rupert Wills	Midfielder / Forward	Collingwood Reserves	AFL National Draft, fifth round (pick No. 63)
39	(Victoria (state)) Ben Crocker	Midfielder / Forward	Oakleigh Chargers	AFL National Draft, fifth round (pick No. 65)
23	(Queensland) Lachlan Keeffe	Defender	Collingwood	AFL Rookie Draft, first round (pick No. 7)
40	(Queensland) Josh Smith	Midfielder	Redland	AFL Rookie Draft, second round (pick No. 25)
24	(Queensland) Josh Thomas	Midfielder	Collingwood	AFL Rookie Draft, third round (pick No. 42)
41	(Victoria (state)) Tim Golds	Defender	Greater Western Sydney	AFL Rookie Draft, fourth round (pick No. 55)

==== Out ====
No.	Name	Position	New Club	via
2	(Victoria (state)) Sam Dwyer	Midfielder / Forward		delisted
14	(Victoria (state)) Clinton Young	Midfielder / Forward		delisted
27	(New South Wales) Tony Armstrong	Defender		delisted
39	(Victoria (state)) Michael Manteit	Defender / Midfielder		delisted
33	(Victoria (state)) Patrick Karnezis	Forward		retired
41	(Western Australia) Brenden Abbott	Forward		delisted
7	(South Australia) Ben Kennedy	Midfielder / Forward	Melbourne	trade
40	(Victoria (state)) Paul Seedsman	Defender	Adelaide	trade
21	(Victoria (state)) Nathan Freeman	Midfielder	St Kilda	trade
3	(Victoria (state)) Brent Macaffer	Midfielder / Forward		retired
34	(Western Australia) Alan Toovey	Defender		retired
36	(Victoria (state)) Dane Swan	Midfielder		retired

== Season summary ==
=== Pre-season matches ===
Collingwood's 2016 NAB Challenge fixtures
Date and local time	Opponent	Scores^{[a]}			Venue	Attendance	Ref
Date and local time	Opponent	Home	Away	Result	Venue	Attendance	Ref
Friday, 26 February (7:10 pm)	Geelong	2.16.9 (123)	0.21.5 (131)	Won by 8 points	Simonds Stadium [A]	20,460	
Saturday, 5 March (4:40 pm)	North Melbourne	1.10.8 (77)	0.12.13 (85)	Won by 8 points	Robertson Oval [A]	6,000	
Saturday, 12 March (1:10 pm)	Western Bulldogs	1.15.8 (107)	1.14.12 (105)	Won by 2 points	Etihad Stadium [H]	12,594	

=== Regular season ===
Collingwood's 2016 AFL season fixtures
Round	Date and local time	Opponent	Home	Away	Result	Venue	Attendance	Ladder position	Ref
Round	Date and local time	Opponent	Scores^{[a]}			Venue	Attendance	Ladder position	Ref
1	Saturday, 26 March (7:25 pm)	Sydney	18.25 (133)	7.11 (53)	Lost by 80 points	SCG [A]	33,857	17th	
2	Friday, 1 April (7:50 pm)	Richmond	13.9 (87)	12.14 (86)	Won by 1 point	MCG [H]	72,761	14th	
3	Saturday, 9 April (1:45 pm)	St Kilda	18.11 (119)	14.6 (90)	Lost by 29 points	MCG [A]	50,903	14th	
4	Sunday, 17 April (3:20 pm)	Melbourne	9.13 (67)	16.6 (102)	Lost by 35 points	MCG [H]	47,558	15th	
5	Monday, 25 April (3:20 pm)	Essendon	22.10 (142)	11.7 (73)	Won by 69 points	MCG [H]	85,082	11th	
6	Sunday, 1 May (2:40 pm)	West Coast	18.16 (124)	9.8 (62)	Lost by 62 points	Domain Stadium [A]	37,931	13th	
7	Saturday, 7 May (1:45 pm)	Carlton	12.12 (84)	15.9 (99)	Lost by 15 points	MCG [H]	60,222	14th	
8	Saturday, 14 May (7:25 pm)	Brisbane Lions	10.5 (65)	20.23 (143)	Won by 78 points	Gabba [A]	24,552	12th	
9	Saturday, 21 May (1:45 pm)	Geelong	16.8 (104)	11.14 (80)	Won by 24 points	MCG [H]	59,864	11th	
10	Sunday, 29 May (3:20 pm)	Western Bulldogs	7.11 (53)	11.8 (74)	Lost by 21 points	MCG [H]	45,078	12th	
11	Sunday, 5 June (1:10 pm)	Port Adelaide	7.16 (58)	19.11 (125)	Lost by 67 points	MCG [H]	28,567	12th	
12	Monday, 13 June (3:20 pm)	Melbourne	16.8 (104)	8.10 (58)	Lost by 46 points	MCG [A]	60,158	14th	
13	Bye							14th	
14	Friday, 24 June (7:50 pm)	Fremantle	12.13 (85)	5.7 (37)	Won by 48 points	MCG [H]	20,320	14th	
15	Saturday, 2 July (7:25 pm)	Carlton	6.9 (45)	8.9 (57)	Won by 12 points	MCG [A]	56,157	11th	
16	Saturday, 9 July (1:40 pm)	Greater Western Sydney	14.9 (93)	19.11 (125)	Won by 32 points	Spotless Stadium [A]	13,483	11th	
17	Saturday, 16 July (7:10 pm)	Adelaide	14.13 (97)	10.9 (69)	Lost by 28 points	Adelaide Oval [A]	50,012	12th	
18	Friday, 22 July (7:50 pm)	North Melbourne	12.12 (84)	18.16 (124)	Lost by 40 points	Etihad Stadium [H]	36,041	12th	
19	Saturday, 30 July (4:35 pm)	West Coast	13.13 (91)	11.6 (72)	Won by 19 points	MCG [H]	34,929	12th	
20	Friday, 5 August (7:50 pm)	Richmond	14.8 (92)	11.11 (77)	Lost by 15 points	MCG [A]	49,122	12th	
21	Friday, 12 August (7:50 pm)	Western Bulldogs	14.11 (95)	14.8 (92)	Lost by 3 points	Etihad Stadium [A]	35,010	12th	
22	Saturday, 20 August (7:25 pm)	Gold Coast	16.22 (118)	6.11 (47)	Won by 71 points	Etihad Stadium [H]	17,644	12th	
23	Sunday, 28 August (3:20 pm)	Hawthorn	17.10 (112)	17.9 (111)	Lost by 1 point	MCG [A]	52,968	12th	

== Ladder ==
Pos	Team	Pld	W	L	D	PF	PA	PP	Pts	Qualification
1	Sydney	22	17	5	0	2221	1469	151.2	68	2016 finals
2	Geelong	22	17	5	0	2235	1554	143.8	68	2016 finals
3	Hawthorn	22	17	5	0	2134	1800	118.6	68	2016 finals
4	Greater Western Sydney	22	16	6	0	2380	1663	143.1	64	2016 finals
5	Adelaide	22	16	6	0	2483	1795	138.3	64	2016 finals
6	West Coast	22	16	6	0	2181	1678	130.0	64	2016 finals
7	Western Bulldogs (P)	22	15	7	0	1857	1609	115.4	60	2016 finals
8	North Melbourne	22	12	10	0	1956	1859	105.2	48	2016 finals
9	St Kilda	22	12	10	0	1953	2041	95.7	48	
10	Port Adelaide	22	10	12	0	2055	1939	106.0	40	
11	Melbourne	22	10	12	0	1944	1991	97.6	40	
12	Collingwood	22	9	13	0	1910	1998	95.6	36	
13	Richmond	22	8	14	0	1713	2155	79.5	32	
14	Carlton	22	7	15	0	1568	1978	79.3	28	
15	Gold Coast	22	6	16	0	1778	2273	78.2	24	
16	Fremantle	22	4	18	0	1574	2119	74.3	16	
17	Brisbane Lions	22	3	19	0	1770	2872	61.6	12	
18	Essendon	22	3	19	0	1437	2356	61.0	12	

Source: AFL
Rules for classification: 1) points; 2) percentage; 3) number of points for.
(P) Premiers

== Awards & Milestones ==
=== AFL Awards ===
- Anzac Medal – Steele Sidebottom (Round 5)
- 2016 22under22 selection – Darcy Moore
- 2016 22under22 selection – Brodie Grundy

=== AFL Award Nominations ===
- Round 8 – 2016 AFL Goal of the Year nomination – Taylor Adams
- Round 19 – 2016 AFL Rising Star nomination – Darcy Moore
- 2016 All-Australian team 40-man squad – Scott Pendlebury, Adam Treloar

=== Club Awards ===
- E.W. Copeland Trophy – Scott Pendlebury
- R.T. Rush Trophy – Adam Treloar
- J.J. Joyce Trophy – Steele Sidebottom
- J.F. McHale Trophy – Brodie Grundy
- Jack Regan Trophy – Jeremy Howe
- Joseph Wren Memorial Trophy – Brent Macaffer
- Darren Millane Memorial Trophy – Brent Macaffer
- Harry Collier Trophy – Josh Smith
- Gordon Coventry Trophy – Alex Fasolo
- Gavin Brown Award – Scott Pendlebury

=== Milestones ===
- Round 1 – Adam Treloar (Collingwood debut)
- Round 2 – James Aish (Collingwood debut)
- Round 3 – Jeremy Howe (Collingwood debut)
- Round 3 – Matthew Goodyear (AFL debut)
- Round 5 – Mason Cox (AFL debut)
- Round 5 – Josh Smith (AFL debut)
- Round 7 – Ben Crocker (AFL debut)
- Round 7 – Jarryd Blair (100 goals)
- Round 8 – Jack Frost (50 games)
- Round 8 – Nathan Buckley (100 games as coach)
- Round 9 – Alex Fasolo (100 goals)
- Round 9 – Steele Sidebottom (150 games)
- Round 10 – Brodie Grundy (50 games)
- Round 10 – Jack Crisp (50 AFL games)
- Round 12 – Tom Phillips (AFL debut)
- Round 14 – Collingwood's 1500th VFL/AFL win
- Round 19 – Rupert Wills (AFL debut)
- Round 20 – Levi Greenwood (100 AFL games)
- Round 22 – Adam Treloar (100 AFL games)

== VFL season ==
=== Pre-season matches ===
Collingwood's 2016 VFL pre-season fixture
Date and local time	Opponent	Home	Away	Result	Venue	Ref
Date and local time	Opponent	Scores^{[a]}			Venue	Ref
Sunday, 6 March (01:00 pm)	Werribee	10.7 (67)	9.3 (57)	Won by 10 points	Holden Centre [H]	
Saturday, 12 March (6:00 pm)	Footscray	8.5 (53)	14.10 (94)	Lost by 41 points	Holden Centre [H]	
Saturday, 26 March (3:00 am)	Coburg	16.8 (104)	5.7 (37)	Won by 67 points	Holden Centre [H]	
Saturday, 2 April (12:00 pm)	Geelong	8.10 (58)	16.12 (108)	Won by 50 points	Simonds Stadium [A]	

=== Regular season ===
Collingwood's 2016 VFL season fixture
Round	Date and local time	Opponent	Home	Away	Result	Venue	Ladder position	Ref
Round	Date and local time	Opponent	Scores^{[a]}			Venue	Ladder position	Ref
1	Sunday, 10 April (11:40 am)	Port Melbourne	10.13 (73)	14.13 (97)	Won by 24 points	North Port Oval [A]	5th	
2	Sunday, 17 April (11:45 am)	Casey	10.5 (65)	18.13 (121)	Lost by 56 points	Holden Centre [H]	9th	
3	Sunday, 24 April (2:10 pm)	Essendon	7.8 (48)	20.13 (133)	Lost by 85 points	Victoria Park [H]	12th	
4	Saturday, 30 April (2:00 pm)	Northern Blues	13.13 (91)	14.16 (100)	Won by 9 points	Preston City Oval [A]	9th	
5	Saturday, 7 May (5:15 pm)	Sandringham	7.5 (47)	16.18 (114)	Lost by 67 points	Holden Centre [H]	10th	
6	Saturday, 14 May (1:00 pm)	Geelong	6.8 (44)	8.16 (64)	Won by 20 points	Simonds Stadium [A]	9th	
7	Saturday, 22 May (5:15 pm)	Williamstown	13.8 (86)	12.9 (81)	Won by 5 points	Holden Centre [H]	8th	
8	Bye						9th	
9	Saturday, 4 June (2:00 pm)	Werribee	9.5 (59)	13.10 (88)	Won by 29 points	Avalon Airport Oval [A]	5th	
10	Saturday, 11 June (2:10 pm)	Casey	2.7 (19)	8.11 (59)	Won by 40 points	Casey Fields [A]	4th	
11	Bye						5th	
12	Sunday, 26 June (2:10 pm)	Richmond	14.12 (96)	10.10 (70)	Won by 26 points	Victoria Park [H]	4th	
13	Saturday, 2 July (4:00 pm)	Northern Blues	15.9 (99)	13.8 (86)	Won by 13 points	Holden Centre [H]	4th	
14	Sunday, 10 July (1:00 pm)	North Ballarat	2.7 (19)	13.12 (90)	Won by 71 points	Eureka Stadium [A]	4th	
15	Sunday, 17 July (2:00 pm)	Frankston	12.5 (77)	22.11 (143)	Won by 66 points	Frankston Oval [A]	2nd	
16	Bye						3rd	
17	Saturday, 30 July (12:00 pm)	Geelong	13.14 (92)	5.12 (42)	Won by 50 points	Victoria Park [H]	3rd	
18	Saturday, 6 August (1:00 pm)	Coburg	19.18 (132)	10.4 (64)	Won by 68 points	Victoria Park [H]	3rd	
19	Saturday, 13 August (1:00 pm)	Port Melbourne	12.12 (84)	10.8 (68)	Won by 16 points	Victoria Park [H]	2nd	
20	Saturday, 20 August (1:00 pm)	Box Hill	7.15 (57)	12.6 (78)	Won by 21 points	Box Hill City Oval [A]	1st	
21	Saturday, 27 August (12:00 pm)	Footscray	16.9 (105)	10.13 (73)	Lost by 32 points	Whitten Oval [A]	2nd	

=== Finals series ===
Collingwood's 2016 VFL finals series fixture
Round	Date and local time	Opponent	Home	Away	Result	Venue	Ref
Round	Date and local time	Opponent	Scores^{[a]}			Venue	Ref
2nd Qualifying Final	Saturday, 3 September (2:00 pm)	Williamstown	16.6 (102)	7.14 (56)	Won by 46 points	Ikon Park [H]	
2nd Preliminary Final	Saturday, 17 September (2:40 pm)	Footscray	9.8 (62)	27.19 (181)	Lost by 119 points	North Port Oval [H]	
Collingwood was eliminated from the 2016 VFL finals series

=== Ladder ===
Pos	Team	Pld	W	L	D	PF	PA	PP	Pts	Qualification
1	Casey	18	14	4	0	1829	1090	167.8	56	Finals series
2	Collingwood	18	14	4	0	1541	1323	116.5	56	Finals series
3	Williamstown	18	13	5	0	1746	1201	145.4	52	Finals series
4	Footscray (P)	18	12	6	0	1558	1447	107.7	48	Finals series
5	Geelong	18	11	7	0	1694	1232	137.5	44	Finals series
6	Port Melbourne	18	11	7	0	1383	1329	104.1	44	Finals series
7	Sandringham	18	10	8	0	1675	1465	114.3	40	Finals series
8	Essendon	18	10	8	0	1603	1477	108.5	40	Finals series
9	Richmond	18	9	9	0	1482	1343	110.3	36	
10	Box Hill	18	7	11	0	1450	1440	100.7	28	
11	Werribee	18	7	11	0	1430	1757	81.4	28	
12	Coburg	18	6	12	0	1259	1557	80.9	24	
13	Northern Blues	18	6	12	0	1347	1890	71.3	24	
14	North Ballarat	18	3	15	0	1076	1826	58.9	12	
15	Frankston	18	2	16	0	1131	1827	61.9	8	

Source: Fox Sports Pulse
Rules for classification: 1) points; 2) percentage; 3) number of points for.

== Notes ==
Key

- H Home match.
- A Away match.

Notes

- **^{a}** Collingwood's scores are indicated in **bold** font.
