= History of the Greater Western Sydney Giants =

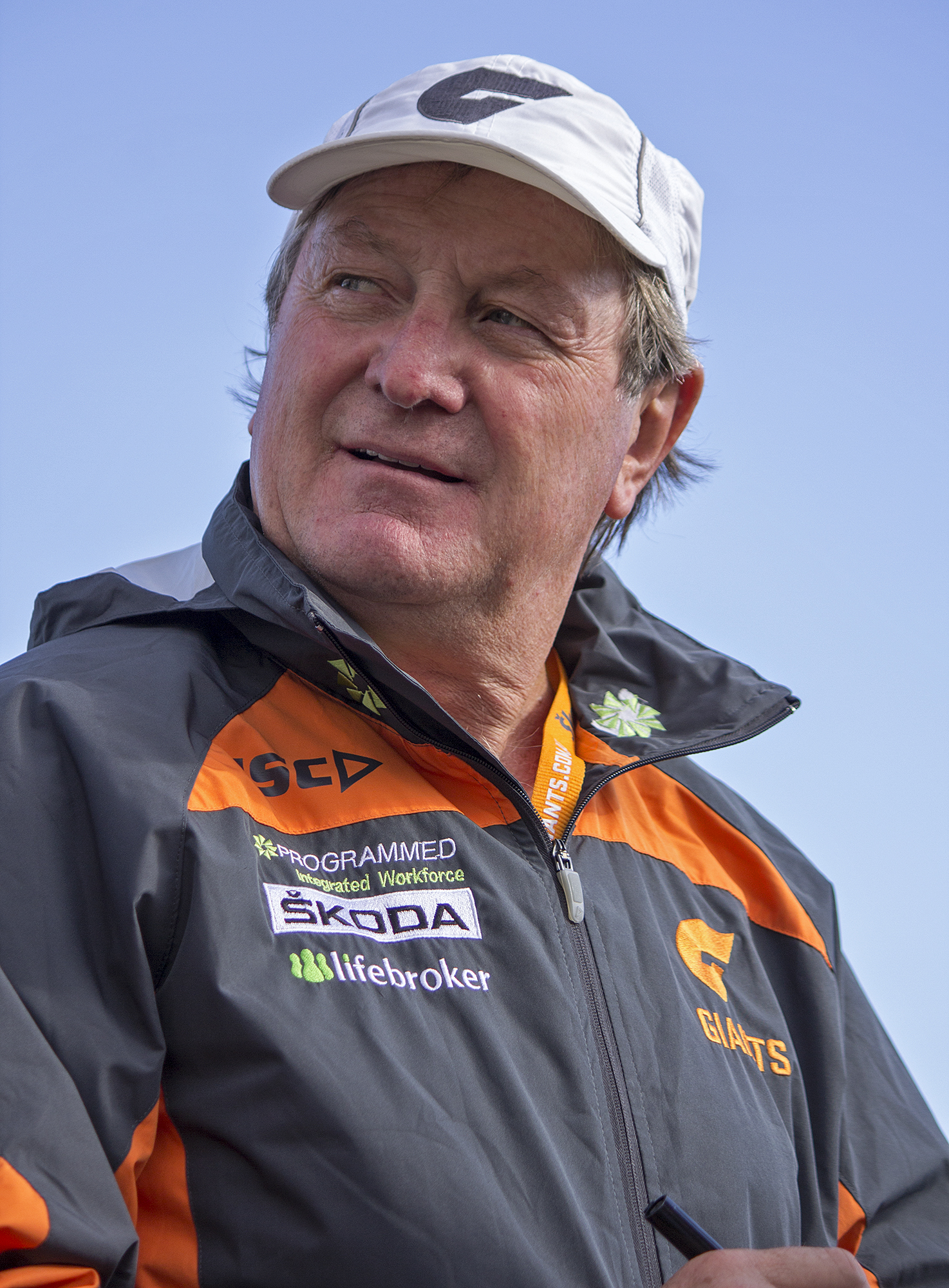
Kevin Sheedy was announced as the inaugural coach of GWS on 9 November 2009.

The Australian Football League registered the name Western Sydney Football Club Ltd with the Australian Securities and Investments Commission in January 2008. On 12 March 2008 the AFL received unanimous support from the existing 16 clubs for two expansion teams to enter the league, one of which was to be based in western Sydney. The Western Sydney working party met on 22 July to discuss player rules and draft concessions.

The Australian Football League Commission continued to delay their final decision on the new western Sydney franchise throughout 2008 before announcing a $100 million redevelopment of Sydney Showground Stadium on 15 November.

Team GWS also announced former Essendon senior coach Kevin Sheedy was officially announced as Greater Western Sydney's inaugural head coach on 9 November 2009.

== Acceptance ==
On 29 July 2010 AFL Chief Executive Andrew Demetriou announced that the Greater Western Sydney bid team had been granted a provisional license to enter the league in 2012 and would become the eighteenth team in the Australian Football League.

== 2010: TAC Cup ==
Greater Western Sydney were permitted to use any player under the age of 18 from New South Wales, Australian Capital Territory and Northern Territory to compete for the team in their TAC Cup year. The team played its first competitive game in the TAC Cup against the Northern Knights on 3 April. The Knights would belt GWS by 94 points at Blacktown Olympic Park.

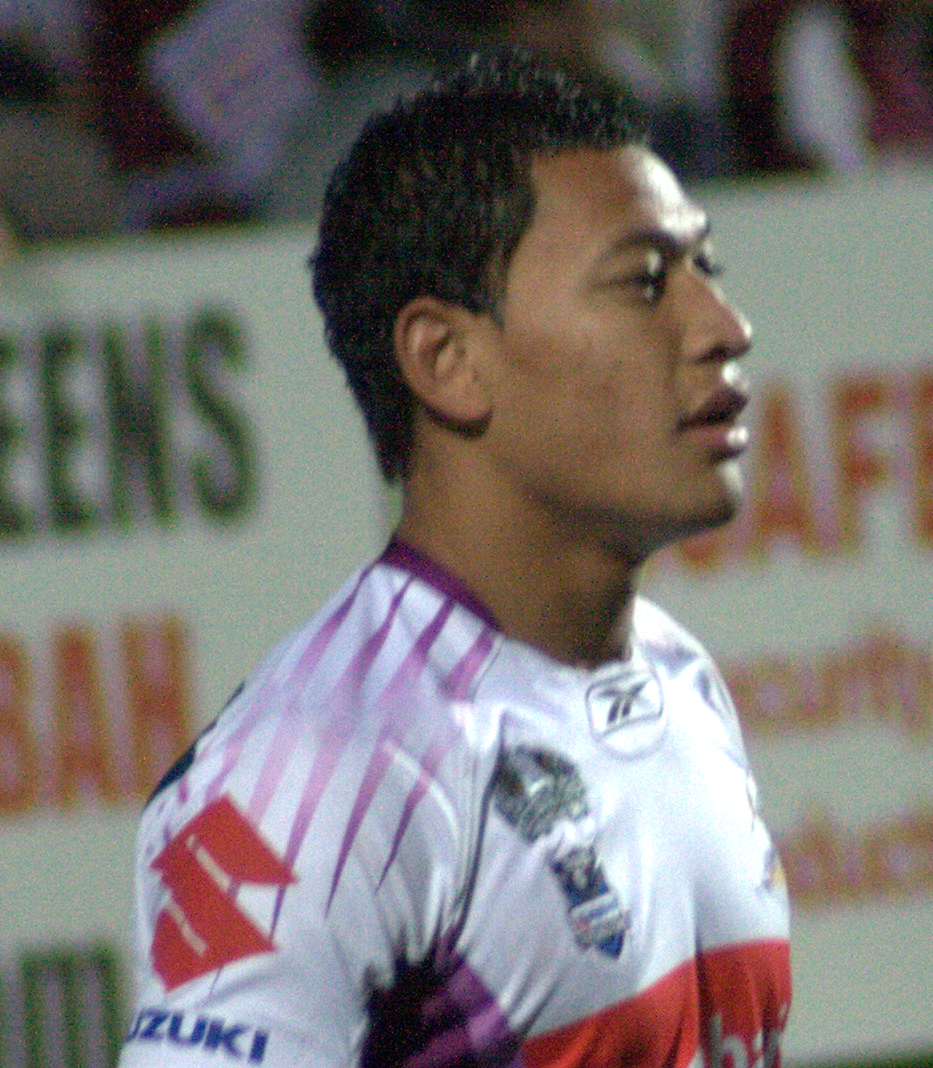
Rugby League international Israel Folau signed for GWS on 1 June 2010.

On 1 June the club announced the signings of their first three players in the form of zone selections Curtly Hampton, Mark Whiley and Sam Schulz. On the same day, the club also announced the signing of professional rugby league footballer Israel Folau. Folau's three-year contract with GWS would begin in 2011 as they team entered the North East Australian Football League.

On 16 November the club revealed their guernseys and their nickname of the "Giants".

== 2011: NEAFL ==
The Greater Western Sydney Football Club were permitted access to a dozen 17-year-olds throughout Australia that would compete for the club in their NEAFL year. The list of the 12 selected players was revealed in December 2010, which included Tomas Bugg (Gippsland), Jeremy Cameron (North Ballarat), Sam Darley (North Hobart), Josh Growden (Woodville-West Torrens), Jarrod Harding (Woodville-West Torrens), Jack Hombsch (Sturt), Tim Golds (Oakleigh), Dylan Shiel (Dandenong), Adam Treloar (Dandenong), Simon Tunbridge (Perth), Gerald Ugle (Perth) and Nathan Wilson (Peel). The club also attempted to relocate Swan Districts 16-year-old Stephen Coniglio to join the club for their NEAFL season, as the Gold Coast did 12 months previous with David Swallow. The AFL did not allow the move as Coniglio had not finished his year 12 studies.

== 2012–2013: AFL Development Years ==
=== 2012: Inaugural season ===
As a part of the concessions package on entry to the AFL, the Giants were permitted to sign up to sixteen off contract players at other clubs. Adelaide defender Phil Davis made history on 2 August 2011 when he became the first AFL contracted player to sign for the Giants. Further signings included Callan Ward (Western Bulldogs), Rhys Palmer (Fremantle Dockers), Tom Scully (Melbourne Demons) and Sam Reid (Western Bulldogs). Further concessions were given to the club during the 2011 AFL draft when they received nine of the first fifteen picks. The picks were used to acquire Jonathan Patton (1), Stephen Coniglio (2), Dom Tyson (3), Will Hoskin-Elliott (4), Matt Buntine (5), Nick Haynes (7), Adam Tomlinson (9), Liam Sumner (10), Toby Greene (11), Taylor Adams (13) and Devon Smith (14).

=== 2013: Emergence of Jeremy Cameron ===
In Round 6 the Giants looked to cause a major upset when they led the undefeated Essendon Bombers at half time by 23 points at Etihad Stadium. Giants forward Jeremy Cameron kicked a club record six goals in the game but a strong finish from Essendon prevented the Giants from securing their first win of the season.

Cameron's goal kicking feats were so impressive that he found himself tied first in the Coleman Medal race with Jarryd Roughead and Josh Kennedy following a two-goal effort against Brisbane in Round 21.

== 2014–present: The Big Three ==
The Giants entered the 2014 AFL season with three high-profile forwards after securing Tom Boyd with the number one pick in the 2013 AFL draft. Boyd, along with 2011 number one draft pick Jonathan Patton and Jeremy Cameron, who finished third in the 2013 Coleman Medal race, were heralded by the media as "The Big Three". The club also recruited premiership players Josh Hunt, Shane Mumford and Heath Shaw during the 2013 trade period in an attempt to add experience to the youthful team.

== Results over the years ==
Season	Senior Coach	Home & Away Season					Finals Series		
Season	Senior Coach	Wins	Losses	Draws	%	Ladder Position	Wins	Losses	Outcome
2012	Kevin Sheedy	2	20	0	46.2	18th out of 18	-	-	-
2013	Kevin Sheedy	1	21	0	51.0	18th out of 18	-	-	-
2014	Leon Cameron*	6	16	0	76.7	16th out of 18	-	-	-
2015	Leon Cameron*	11	11	0	99.0	11th out of 18	-	-	-
2016	Leon Cameron*	16	6	0	143.1	4th out of 18	1	1	Lost to Western Bulldogs in Preliminary Final
2017	Leon Cameron*	14	6	2	114.8	4th out of 18	1	2	Lost to Richmond in Preliminary Final
2018	Leon Cameron*	13	8	1	114.3	7th out of 18	1	1	Lost to Collingwood in Semi Final
2019	Leon Cameron*	13	9	0	115.4	6th out of 18	3	1	Lost to Richmond in Grand Final
2020	Leon Cameron*	8	9	0	95.6	10th out of 18	-	-	-
2021	Leon Cameron*	11	10	1	99.7	7th out of 18	1	1	Lost to Geelong in Semi Final
2022	Leon Cameron*	6	16	0	84.6	16th out of 18	-	-	-
2023	Adam Kingsley	13	10	0	107.1	7th out of 18	2	1	Lost to Collingwood in Prelim Final
2024	Adam Kingsley	15	8	0	109.1	4th out of 18	0	2	Lost to Brisbane in Semi Final
2025	Adam Kingsley	16	7	0	115.3	5th out of 18	0	1	Lost to Hawthorn in Elimination Final
Average		10.4	11.2	0.3	98.0	10th out of 18	0.6	0.7	

*Stepped down during the 2022 season.

== Membership by year ==
Per the AFL annual membership update. (Note: Club-reported numbers may differ from AFL's official ones)

	2012	2013	2014	2015	2016	2017	2018	2019	2020	2021	2022	2023	2024	2025
Total	10,241	12,681	13,040	13,480	15,312	20,944	25,243	30,109	30,841	30,185	32,614	33,036	36,629	37,705
