= Josh Saunders (disambiguation) =

Josh Saunders (born 1981) is an American soccer player

Josh or Joshua Saunders may also refer to:

- Josh Saunders (Australian footballer) (born 1994), Australian rules footballer for St Kilda
- Josh Saunders (EastEnders), a fictional character on EastEnders
- Takion, real name Joshua Saunders
- Joshua Saunders, High Sheriff of Bristol, 1860
- Joshua Saunders (Hollyoaks)
