= Marcus Adams (footballer) =

Australian rules footballer

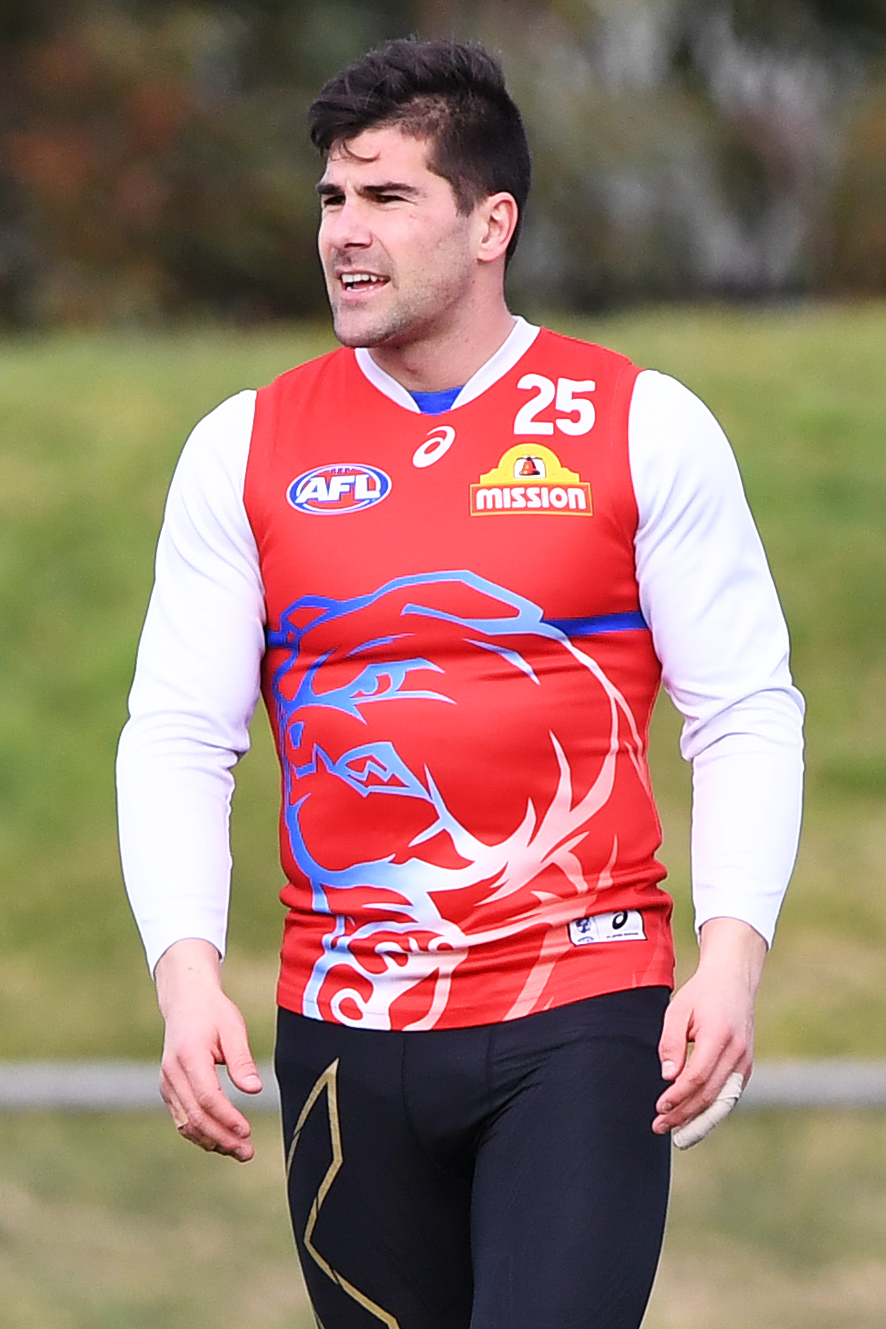
- Adams training with the Western Bulldogs in August 2018

Personal information
- Full name: Marcus Andrew Adams
- Nickname: The Specimen
- Born: 30 June 1993 (age 33)
- Original team: West Perth
- Draft: No. 35, 2015 national draft
- Height: 192 cm (6 ft 4 in)
- Weight: 98 kg (216 lb)
- Position: Key defender

Playing career^{1}
| Years | Club | Games (Goals) |
| 2016–2018 | Western Bulldogs | 27 (4) |
| 2019–2023 | Brisbane Lions | 46 (1) |
| Total | | 73 (5) |
- ^{1} Playing statistics correct to the end of the 2023 season.

Marcus Andrew Adams (born 30 June 1993) is a former Australian rules footballer who played for the Western Bulldogs and the Brisbane Lions in the Australian Football League (AFL).

He was drafted as a mature-aged selection with pick 35 in the 2015 national draft by the Bulldogs, where he played 27 games over three seasons. Ahead of the 2019 season, he was traded to the Lions, for whom he played 46 games before retiring due to concussion issues in 2023.

== AFL career ==
Adams made his debut in round 1, 2016 against Fremantle. He played a further 10 games in his debut season, before a foot injury sustained in the round 15 clash against Sydney cut short his year.

Adams made his first appearance in 2017 in the round 2 grand final rematch against the Swans, as a direct replacement for injured veteran Dale Morris. He was among the best players, recording 20 disposals, 9 of which were contested.

Adams was traded to the Brisbane Lions ahead of the 2019 season. He played 10 games in his first season for the club, before a foot injury limited him to a single match the following year. In 2021 and 2022, he was a consistent presence in the Lions' backline, playing 35 games across the two seasons.

After the conclusion of the 2022 season, Adams was moved to the inactive list following long-term concussion symptoms. He announced his retirement ahead of the 2023 finals series after doctors recommended he no longer play contact sport due to lingering concussion issues.

== Statistics ==
Legend
| G | Goals | K | Kicks | D | Disposals | T | Tackles |
| B | Behinds | H | Handballs | M | Marks |

| Season | Team | No. | Games | Totals | | | | | | | Averages (per game) | | | | | | | Votes |
| Season | Team | No. | Games | G | B | K | H | D | M | T | G | B | K | H | D | M | T | Votes |
|---|---|---|---|---|---|---|---|---|---|---|---|---|---|---|---|---|---|---|
| 2016 | Western Bulldogs | 33 | 11 | 0 | 2 | 95 | 84 | 179 | 63 | 25 | 0.0 | 0.2 | 8.6 | 7.6 | 16.3 | 5.7 | 2.3 | 0 |
| 2017 | Western Bulldogs | 25 | 10 | 4 | 7 | 86 | 68 | 154 | 65 | 30 | 0.4 | 0.7 | 8.6 | 6.8 | 15.4 | 6.5 | 3.0 | 0 |
| 2018 | Western Bulldogs | 25 | 6 | 0 | 0 | 55 | 35 | 90 | 37 | 12 | 0.0 | 0.0 | 9.2 | 5.8 | 15.0 | 6.2 | 2.0 | 2 |
| 2019 | Brisbane Lions | 24 | 10 | 0 | 0 | 74 | 31 | 105 | 51 | 12 | 0.0 | 0.0 | 7.4 | 3.1 | 10.5 | 5.1 | 1.2 | 0 |
| 2020 (Note: The 2020 season was played with 17 home-and-away matches per team (down from 22) and 16-minute quarters with time on (down from 20-minute quarters with time on) due to the impact of the COVID-19 pandemic.) | Brisbane Lions | 24 | 1 | 0 | 0 | 2 | 3 | 5 | 1 | 0 | 0.0 | 0.0 | 2.0 | 3.0 | 5.0 | 1.0 | 0.0 | 0 |
| 2021 | Brisbane Lions | 24 | 17 | 0 | 0 | 166 | 71 | 237 | 92 | 30 | 0.0 | 0.0 | 9.6 | 4.6 | 14.2 | 5.4 | 1.5 | 0 |
| 2022 | Brisbane Lions | 24 | 18 | 1 | 0 | 177 | 56 | 233 | 104 | 24 | 0.1 | 0.0 | 9.8 | 3.1 | 12.9 | 5.8 | 1.3 | 0 |
| 2023 | Brisbane Lions | 24 | 0 | — | — | — | — | — | — | — | — | — | — | — | — | — | — | 0 |
| Career | | | 73 | 5 | 9 | 655 | 348 | 1003 | 413 | 133 | 0.1 | 0.1 | 9.0 | 4.8 | 13.7 | 5.7 | 1.8 | 2 |
