= Jackson Paine =

Australian rules footballer

Personal information
- Born: 21 June 1993 (age 33)
- Original team: Sandringham Dragons (TAC Cup)
- Draft: No. 50, 2011 National Draft, Collingwood; No. 2, 2016 Rookie Draft, Brisbane Lions
- Height: 194 cm (6 ft 4 in)
- Weight: 98 kg (216 lb)
- Position: Forward

Playing career^{1}
| Years | Club | Games (Goals) |
| 2012–2013 | Collingwood | 6 (8) |
| 2014–2016 | Brisbane Lions | 10 (3) |
| Total | | 16 (11) |
- ^{1} Playing statistics correct to the end of 2016.

Jackson Paine (born 1993) is a former professional Australian rules footballer who played for the Collingwood Football Club and Brisbane Lions in the Australian Football League (AFL). He was recruited by the Collingwood Football Club with pick 50 in the 2011 national draft. Paine made his debut in round 1, 2012 against Hawthorn. He was traded in a straight swap for Patrick Karnezis in the 2013 trade period. He was delisted by Brisbane in October 2015, however, he was re-drafted in the 2016 rookie draft. He was delisted again by Brisbane at the end of the 2016 season following a battle with gout.

== Statistics ==
Legend
| G | Goals | K | Kicks | D | Disposals | T | Tackles |
| B | Behinds | H | Handballs | M | Marks |

| Season | Team | No. | Games | Totals | | | | | | | Averages (per game) | | | | | | |
| Season | Team | No. | Games | G | B | K | H | D | M | T | G | B | K | H | D | M | T |
|---|---|---|---|---|---|---|---|---|---|---|---|---|---|---|---|---|---|
| 2012 | Collingwood | 33 | 6 | 8 | 3 | 28 | 20 | 48 | 16 | 16 | 1.3 | 0.5 | 4.7 | 3.3 | 8.0 | 2.7 | 2.7 |
| 2013 | Collingwood | 33 | 0 | — | — | — | — | — | — | — | — | — | — | — | — | — | — |
| 2014 | Brisbane Lions | 39 | 6 | 3 | 4 | 25 | 25 | 50 | 6 | 12 | 0.5 | 0.7 | 4.2 | 4.2 | 8.3 | 1.0 | 2.0 |
| 2015 | Brisbane Lions | 39 | 0 | — | — | — | — | — | — | — | — | — | — | — | — | — | — |
| 2016 | Brisbane Lions | 39 | 4 | 0 | 1 | 18 | 18 | 36 | 10 | 8 | 0.0 | 0.3 | 4.5 | 4.5 | 9.0 | 2.5 | 2.0 |
| Career | | | 16 | 11 | 8 | 71 | 63 | 134 | 32 | 36 | 0.7 | 0.5 | 4.4 | 3.9 | 8.4 | 2.0 | 2.3 |
