= Aidyn Johnson =

Australian rules footballer

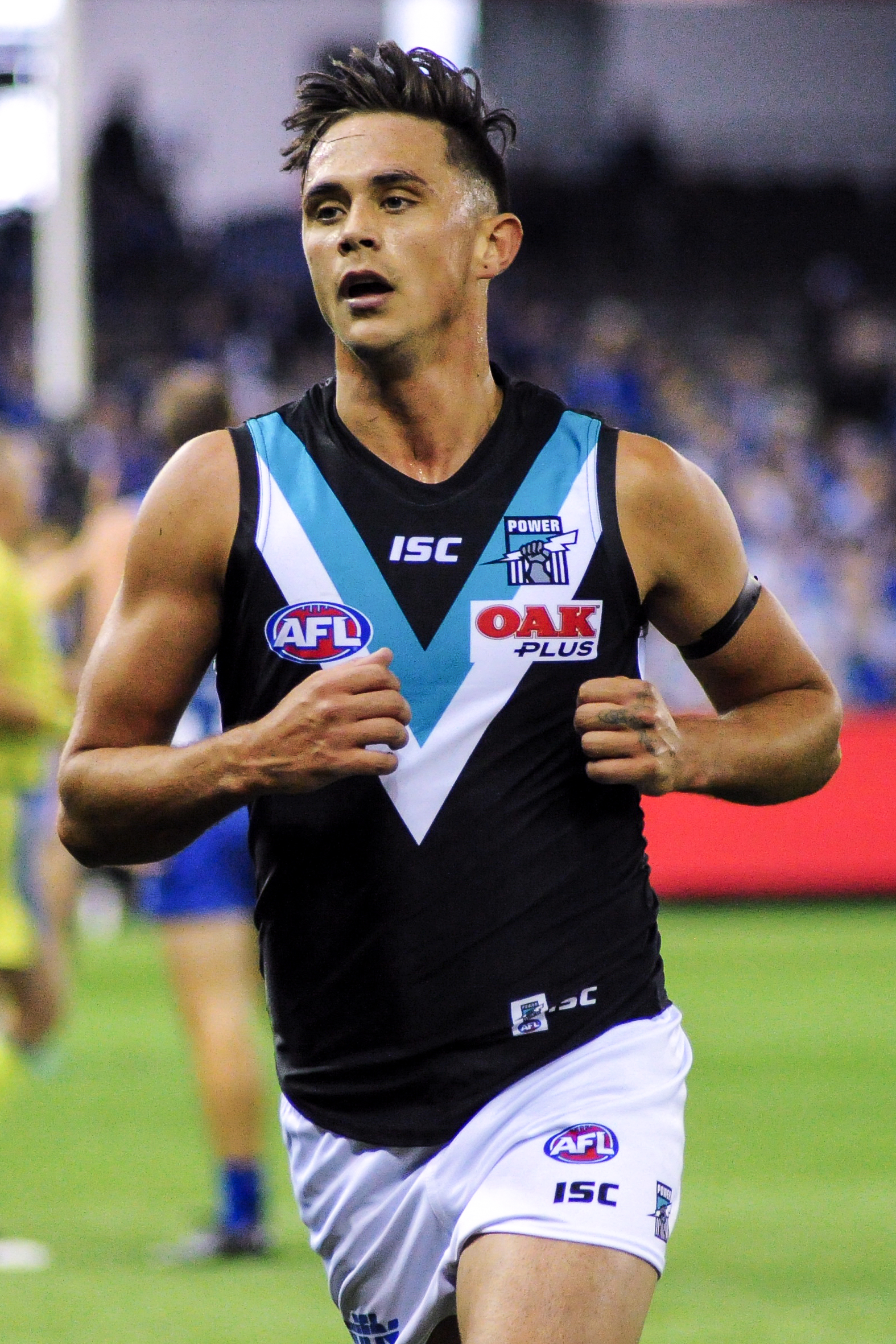
- Johnson playing for Port Adelaide in June 2018

Personal information
- Born: 31 October 1997 (age 29)
- Original team: Bendigo Pioneers (TAC Cup)
- Draft: No. 45, 2015 national draft
- Debut: Round 5, 2017, Port Adelaide vs. Carlton, at Adelaide Oval
- Height: 185 cm (6 ft 1 in)
- Weight: 81 kg
- Position: Forward

Club information
- Current club: Port Adelaide
- Number: 31

Playing career^{1}
Years	Club	Games (Goals)
2016–2019	Port Adelaide	11 (8)
- ^{1} Playing statistics correct to the end of 2019.

Aidyn Johnson (born 31 October 1997) is a former professional Australian rules footballer who played for the Port Adelaide Football Club in the Australian Football League (AFL). He was drafted by Port Adelaide with their second selection and forty-fifth overall in the 2015 national draft. He made his debut in the 90-point win against Carlton at the Adelaide Oval in round five of the 2017 season after he was a late inclusion for the injured Hamish Hartlett. Johnson kicked a goal with his first kick.

Johnson is an Indigenous Australian of Wiradjuri descent.
