= Lachlan Keeffe =

Australian rules footballer (born 1990)

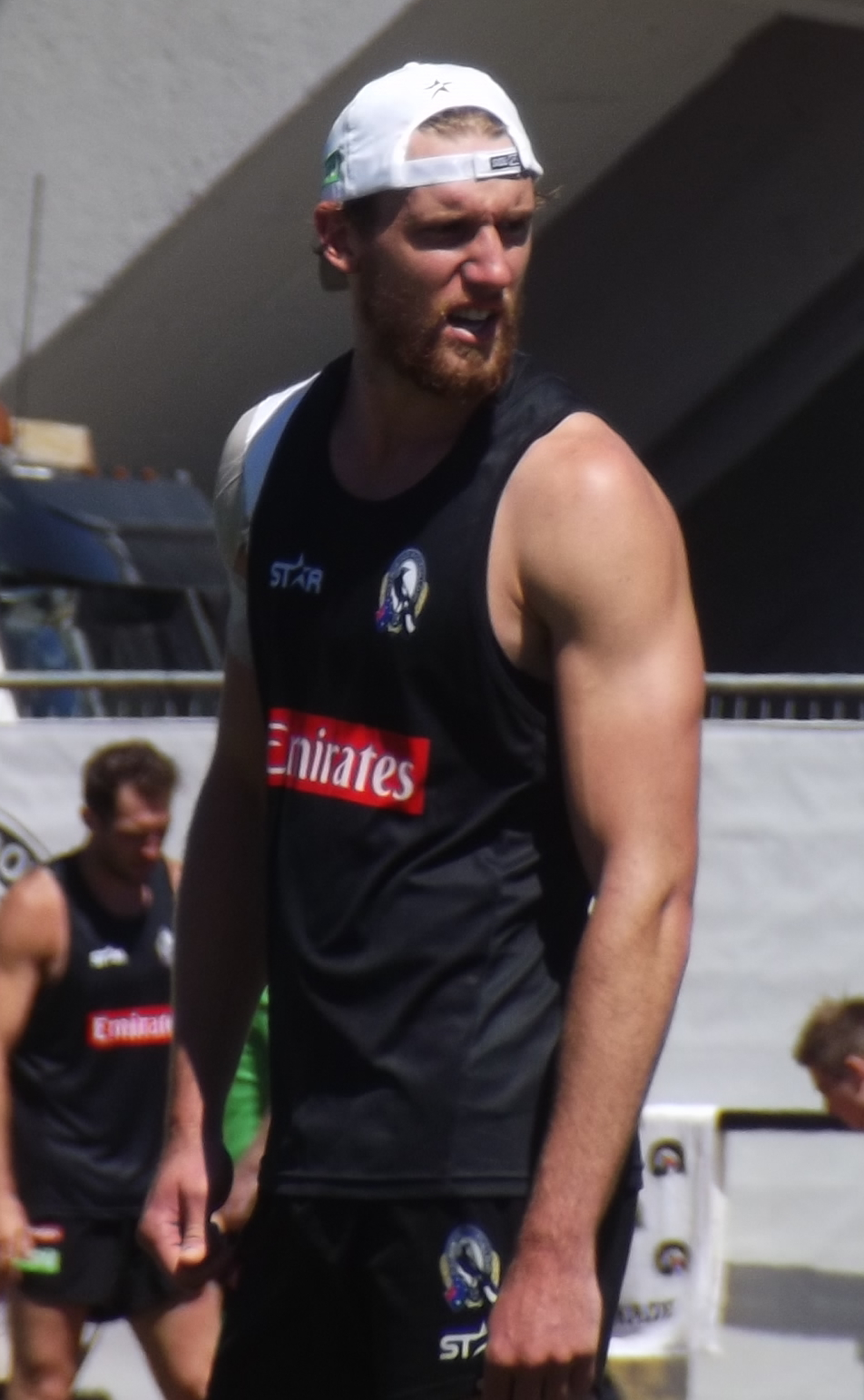
- Keeffe training with Collingwood in 2014

Personal information
- Full name: Lachlan Keeffe
- Born: 14 April 1990 (age 36); Gympie, Queensland, Australia
- Draft: No. 69, 2009 rookie draft
- Height: 204 cm (6 ft 8 in)
- Weight: 99 kg (218 lb)
- Position: Key defender/Key forward/Ruck

Playing career
Years	Club	Games (Goals)
2009–2017	Collingwood	40 (7)
2018–2025	Greater Western Sydney	79 (13)
Total		119 (20)

Lachlan Keeffe (born 14 April 1990) is a former professional Australian rules footballer who played for the Collingwood and Greater Western Sydney in the Australian Football League (AFL).

== Early life ==
Keeffe was raised in Gympie, Queensland. He grew up playing soccer, playing under 17s in the midfield position. With little prior knowledge of the game he made 5 appearances in Australian rules football during his time as a boarder at Marist College Ashgrove, with his size and athletic ability taking the notice of talent scouts from Collingwood.

== AFL career ==
=== Collingwood ===
In 2008, Keeffe was signed by the Collingwood Football Club as an unregistered player and was later drafted with pick number 69 in the 2009 Rookie Draft. He played for Old Trinity in the VAFA to develop his game during this time.

In 2009, Keeffe played 20 games for Collingwood's reserves team in the VFL. After two seasons at VFL level, Keeffe earned a promotion to the club's senior list for 2011.

In 2011, Keeffe played in Collingwood's NAB Cup pre-season campaign, including the winning Pre Season Grand Final win against Essendon. Keeffe made his senior AFL debut against North Melbourne in round 16, 2011 at the MCG.

Keeffe played the first 9 games of the 2012 season, however, he required a knee reconstruction after round 9. Keeffe made his return to AFL ranks the next year in the round 17 loss to Gold Coast.

Keeffe, along with teammate Josh Thomas, tested positive to the banned substance clenbuterol in drug tests taken in February 2015. Both players accepted provisional suspensions in March 2015. On 10 August 2015, Thomas accepted his two-year ban from the tribunal and that day was delisted by Collingwood football club but was told he'd be re-drafted as a rookie for the 2017 season if still available in the draft. He was banned from AFL competition until 9 February 2017

On 26 July 2015, teammate Travis Cloke revealed that Keeffe was interested in taking up a role as an NFL punter, and he would soon be travelling to the United States.

On 27 November 2015, Keeffe and his teammate Josh Thomas were re-drafted to Collingwood through the rookie draft.

At the conclusion of the 2017 season, Keeffe was delisted by Collingwood.

=== Greater Western Sydney ===
Keeffe was recruited by Greater Western Sydney as a delisted free agent for the 2018 AFL season.

Keeffe played 79 games for the Giants across 7 seasons, before retiring at the end of the 2025 season.

== Statistics ==
Legend
G	Goals	K	Kicks	D	Disposals	T	Tackles
B	Behinds	H	Handballs	M	Marks	H/O	Hit-outs

Season	Team	No.	Games	Totals								Averages (per game)								Votes
Season	Team	No.	Games	G	B	K	H	D	M	T	H/O	G	B	K	H	D	M	T	H/O	Votes
2009	Collingwood	44	0	—	—	—	—	—	—	—	—	—	—	—	—	—	—	—	—	0
2010	Collingwood	44	0	—	—	—	—	—	—	—	—	—	—	—	—	—	—	—	—	0
2011	Collingwood	23	5	4	3	29	13	42	19	4	0	0.8	0.6	5.8	2.6	8.4	3.8	0.8	0.0	0
2012	Collingwood	23	9	1	0	69	31	100	42	11	6	0.1	0.0	7.7	3.4	11.1	4.7	1.2	0.7	0
2013	Collingwood	23	8	1	0	65	33	98	40	11	1	0.1	0.0	8.1	4.1	12.3	5.0	1.4	0.1	0
2014	Collingwood	23	18	1	0	146	70	216	71	20	0	0.1	0.0	8.1	3.9	12.0	3.9	1.1	0.0	0
2017	Collingwood	23	0	—	—	—	—	—	—	—	—	—	—	—	—	—	—	—	—	0
2018	Greater Western Sydney	25	8	1	0	38	38	76	17	7	67	0.1	0.0	4.8	4.8	9.5	2.1	0.9	8.4	0
2019	Greater Western Sydney	25	10	6	3	53	28	81	36	17	15	0.6	0.3	5.3	2.8	8.1	3.6	1.7	1.5	0
2020 (Note: The 2020 season was played with 17 home-and-away matches per team (down from 22) and 16-minute quarters with time on (down from 20-minute quarters with time on) due to the impact of the COVID-19 pandemic.)	Greater Western Sydney	25	13	0	0	67	50	117	47	11	0	0.0	0.0	5.2	3.8	9.0	3.6	0.8	0.0	0
2021	Greater Western Sydney	25	8	1	0	57	22	79	37	16	19	0.1	0.0	7.1	2.8	9.9	4.6	2.0	2.4	0
2022	Greater Western Sydney	25	18	2	2	89	47	136	48	33	69	0.1	0.1	4.9	2.6	7.6	2.7	1.8	3.8	0
2023	Greater Western Sydney	25	14	1	3	43	46	89	28	20	94	0.1	0.2	3.1	3.3	6.4	2.0	1.4	6.7	0
2024	Greater Western Sydney	25	5	1	4	19	16	35	8	16	90	0.2	0.8	3.8	3.2	7.0	1.6	3.2	18.0	0
2025	Greater Western Sydney	25	3	1	0	19	10	29	1	13	36	0.3	0.0	6.3	3.3	9.7	0.3	4.3	12.0	0
Career			119	20	15	694	404	1098	394	179	397	0.2	0.1	5.8	3.4	9.2	3.3	1.5	3.3	0
