= Brayden Sier =

Australian rules footballer

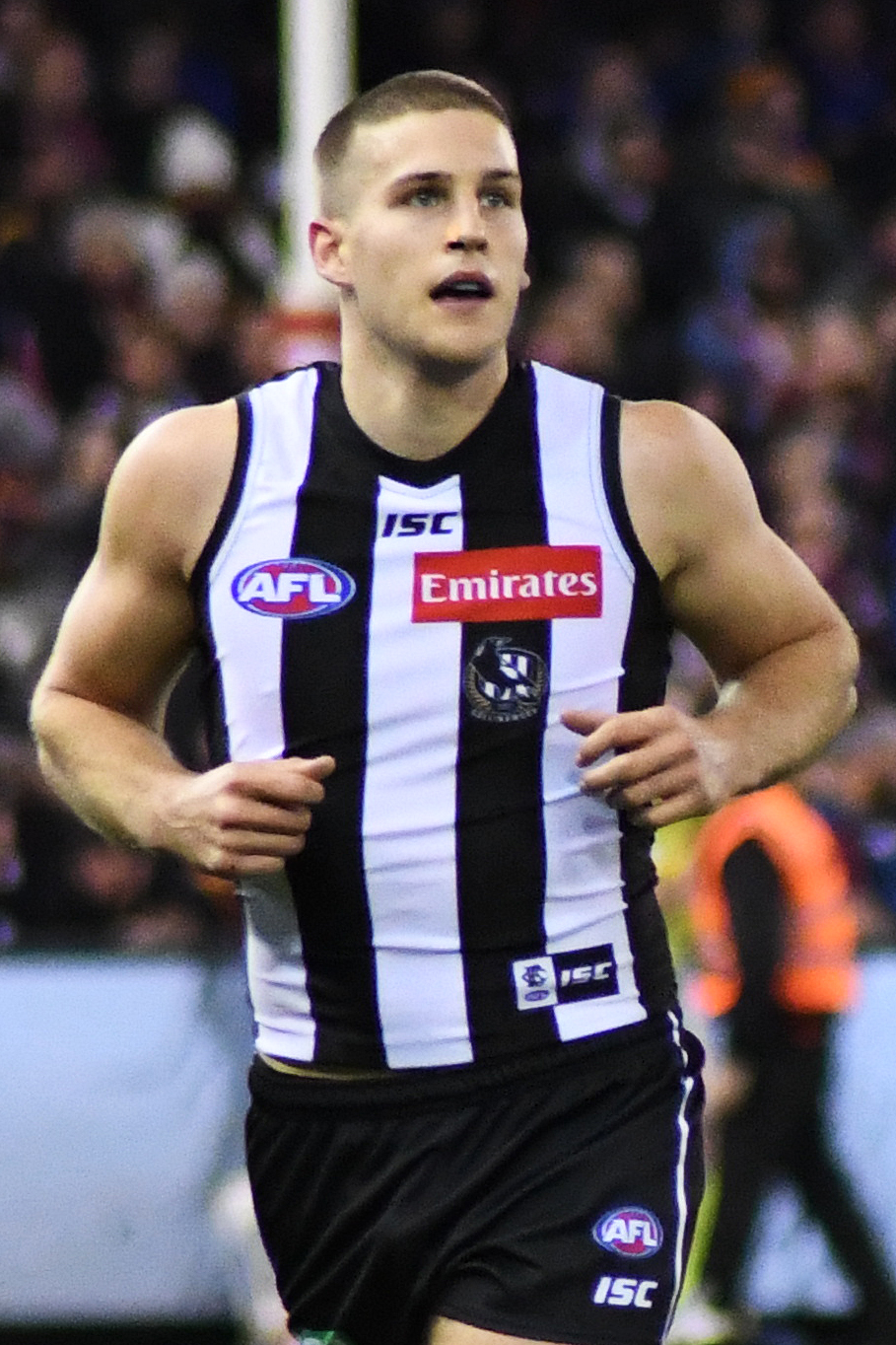
- Sier playing for Collingwood in August 2018

Personal information
- Full name: Brayden Sier
- Born: 12 December 1997 (age 28)
- Original team: Northern Knights (TAC Cup)
- Draft: No. 32, 2015 national draft
- Debut: June 30, 2018, Collingwood vs. Gold Coast, at Carrara Stadium
- Height: 191 cm (6 ft 3 in)
- Weight: 88 kg (194 lb)
- Position: Midfielder

Playing career^{1}
Years	Club	Games (Goals)
2016–2021	Collingwood	28 (6)
- ^{1} Playing statistics correct to the end of the 2021 season.

Brayden Sier (born 12 December 1997) is a professional Australian rules footballer who last played for the Collingwood Football Club in the Australian Football League (AFL).

Sier is from Melbourne and played for Marcellin College and Yarra Junior Football League club Banyule. He also played two games for the Northern Knights in the TAC Cup before he was drafted by Collingwood with pick 32 in the 2015 national draft, their first selection. Sier's drafting was described as a surprise due to his inexperience. He played only 18 Victorian Football League games over two seasons because of a string of injuries – a broken wrist, a severe concussion, a back injury which ended his 2016 season, and injuries to his hamstring, eye socket, and foot.

Sier finally broke through at an AFL level in the second half of the 2018 AFL season, when Adam Treloar was sidelined with a serious hamstring injury. Sier debuted in round 15 against the Gold Coast Suns at Carrara Stadium. He averaged 19.5 possessions (including 10.6 contested), four clearances and 4.6 tackles for the year and played in the 2018 AFL Grand Final loss to the West Coast Eagles.

In October 2021, Sier was delisted by Collingwood.

== Controversies ==
In 2018, he was sanctioned by the AFL with a suspended $5000 fine for betting on AFL events during the 2017 AFL season, although the AFL noted that he was remorseful and fully cooperative with the investigation and that the bets totaled less than $50.

In August 2019, Sier was caught playing basketball in the Diamond Valley Basketball Association. Sier played under the name "Phill Inn" to avoid people knowing that he played for Collingwood. While Sier was playing basketball, he told Collingwood that he had a calf injury.

== Statistics ==
Statistics are correct to the end of the 2021 season

Legend
G	Goals	K	Kicks	D	Disposals	T	Tackles
B	Behinds	H	Handballs	M	Marks

Season	Team	No.	Games	Totals							Averages (per game)						
Season	Team	No.	Games	G	B	K	H	D	M	T	G	B	K	H	D	M	T
2016	Collingwood	35	0	—	—	—	—	—	—	—	—	—	—	—	—	—	—
2017	Collingwood	36	0	—	—	—	—	—	—	—	—	—	—	—	—	—	—
2018	Collingwood	36	12	2	0	97	137	234	18	55	0.2	0.0	8.1	11.4	19.5	1.5	4.6
2019	Collingwood	36	6	2	1	35	51	86	4	22	0.3	0.2	5.8	8.5	14.3	0.7	3.7
2020 (Note: The 2020 season was played with 17 home-and-away matches per team (down from 22) and 16-minute quarters with time on (down from 20-minute quarters with time on) due to the impact of the COVID-19 pandemic.)	Collingwood	36	3	1	1	14	38	52	4	10	0.3	0.3	4.7	12.7	17.3	1.3	3.3
2021	Collingwood	36	7	1	0	32	54	86	16	19	0.1	0.0	4.6	7.7	12.3	2.3	2.7
Career			28	6	2	178	280	458	42	106	0.2	0.1	6.4	10.0	16.4	1.5	3.8
