= Simon Tunbridge =

Australian rules footballer

Personal information
- Full name: Simon Tunbridge
- Nickname: Tunners
- Born: 1 April 1993 (age 33)
- Original team: Greater Western Sydney (NEAFL)
- Draft: No. 51, 2012 rookie draft
- Height: 191 cm (6 ft 3 in)
- Weight: 98 kg (216 lb)

Playing career^{1}
Years	Club	Games (Goals)
2013–2017	West Coast	10 (5)
- ^{1} Playing statistics correct to the end of 2017.

Simon Tunbridge (born 1 April 1993) is a former professional Australian rules footballer who played for the West Coast Eagles in the Australian Football League (AFL). He was recruited by the club in the 2012 rookie draft, with pick 51. Tunbridge made his debut in round 14, 2013, against Essendon at Subiaco Oval. He was delisted in October 2015, however, he was re-drafted in the 2016 rookie draft. He was again delisted at the conclusion of the 2017 season.

== Statistics ==
Statistics are correct to the end of the 2017 season

Legend
G	Goals	K	Kicks	D	Disposals	T	Tackles
B	Behinds	H	Handballs	M	Marks

Season	Team	No.	Games	Totals							Averages (per game)						
Season	Team	No.	Games	G	B	K	H	D	M	T	G	B	K	H	D	M	T
2013	West Coast	46	2	2	1	11	0	11	2	3	1.0	0.5	5.5	0.0	5.5	1.0	1.5
2014	West Coast	32	4	2	4	16	2	18	8	7	0.5	1.0	4.0	0.5	4.5	2.0	1.8
2015	West Coast	32	1	0	0	6	4	10	1	1	0.0	0.0	6.0	4.0	10.0	1.0	1.0
2016	West Coast	32	3	1	0	19	10	29	7	13	0.3	0.0	6.3	3.3	9.7	2.3	4.3
Career			10	5	5	52	16	68	18	24	0.5	0.5	5.2	1.6	6.8	1.8	2.4
