= 2015 AFL draft =

Draft for the Australian Football League

General information
- Date: 24, 27 November 2015
- Time: 5:30 pm ACDT (24 November); 11:00 am AEDT (27 November)
- Location: Adelaide Convention Centre, Adelaide, South Australia
- Network: Fox Footy
- Sponsored by: National Australia Bank

Overview
- League: AFL
- First selection: Jacob Weitering (Carlton)

The 2015 Australian Football League draft consisted of the various periods where the 18 clubs in the Australian Football League (AFL) can trade and recruit players following the completion of the 2015 AFL season. Additions to each club's playing list are not allowed at any other time during the year.

The key dates for the trading and drafting periods were:

- Academy players to be nominated by 15 September. With a bidding process held on 24 November along with father–son selections during the national draft.
- The free agency offer period; held between 9 October and 18 October. Three further free agency periods are held for delisted players, between 31 October and 9 November, 11 November to 20 November, and 25 November to 26 November.
- The trade period; held between 12 October and 22 October.
- The 2015 national draft; held on 24 November at the Adelaide Convention Centre, which, for the first time, included live bidding for academy and father-son selections.
- The 2016 pre-season draft; which was to be held on 27 November, but was cancelled when all clubs declined to take part, and
- The 2016 rookie draft; which was held on 27 November.

Additionally, following the guilty verdicts handed down to 34 past and present Essendon players in January 2016 for doping violations, Essendon was given the opportunity to recruit top-up players between January and March 2016.

== Player movements ==
=== Free agency ===
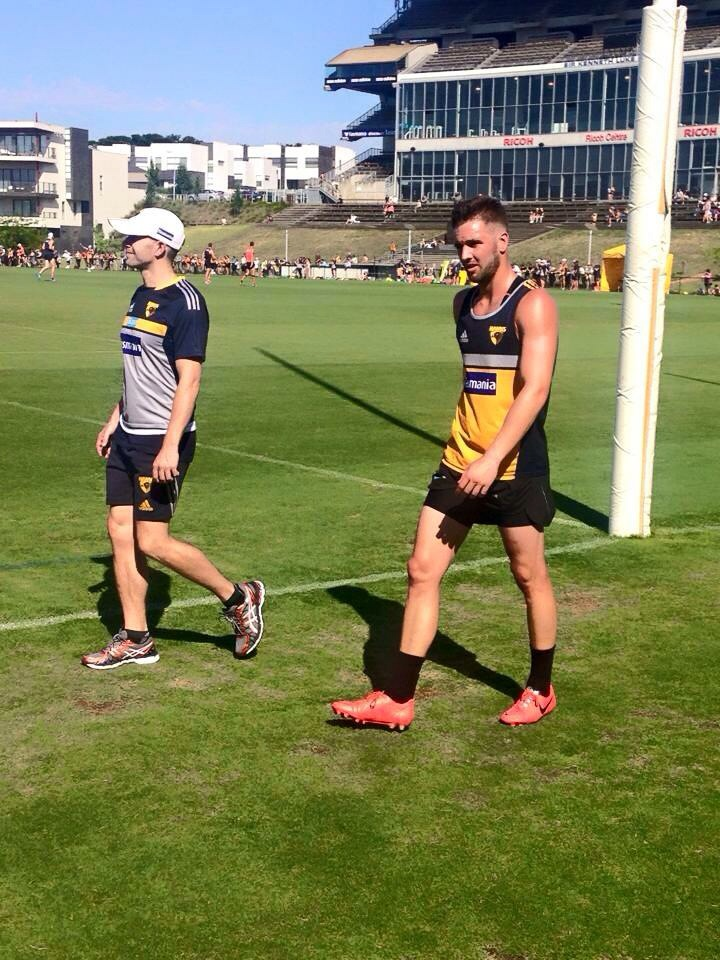
After winning two premierships with Hawthorn, Matt Suckling (right) signed with the Western Bulldogs as an unrestricted free agent

The initial list of free agents, published in March 2015, consisted of 74 unrestricted and restricted free agents, however, 35 of those players re-signed and 15 retired during or after the home-and-away season.

2015 AFL free agency period signings
Player	Date	Free agent type	Former club	New club	Compensation	Ref
Matt Suckling	12 October 2015	Unrestricted	Hawthorn	Western Bulldogs	End of 2nd round	
Scott Selwood	12 October 2015	Restricted	West Coast	Geelong	2nd round	
Matthew Leuenberger	15 October 2015	Restricted	Brisbane Lions	Essendon	End of 2nd round	
Dawson Simpson	16 October 2015	Unrestricted	Geelong	Greater Western Sydney	None	
Andrew Moore	6 November 2015	Delisted	Port Adelaide	Richmond	None	
Jarrad Grant	6 November 2015	Delisted	Western Bulldogs	Gold Coast	None	
Daniel Gorringe	9 November 2015	Delisted	Gold Coast	Carlton	None	
Matthew Wright	26 November 2015	Delisted	Adelaide	Carlton	None	

=== Trades ===
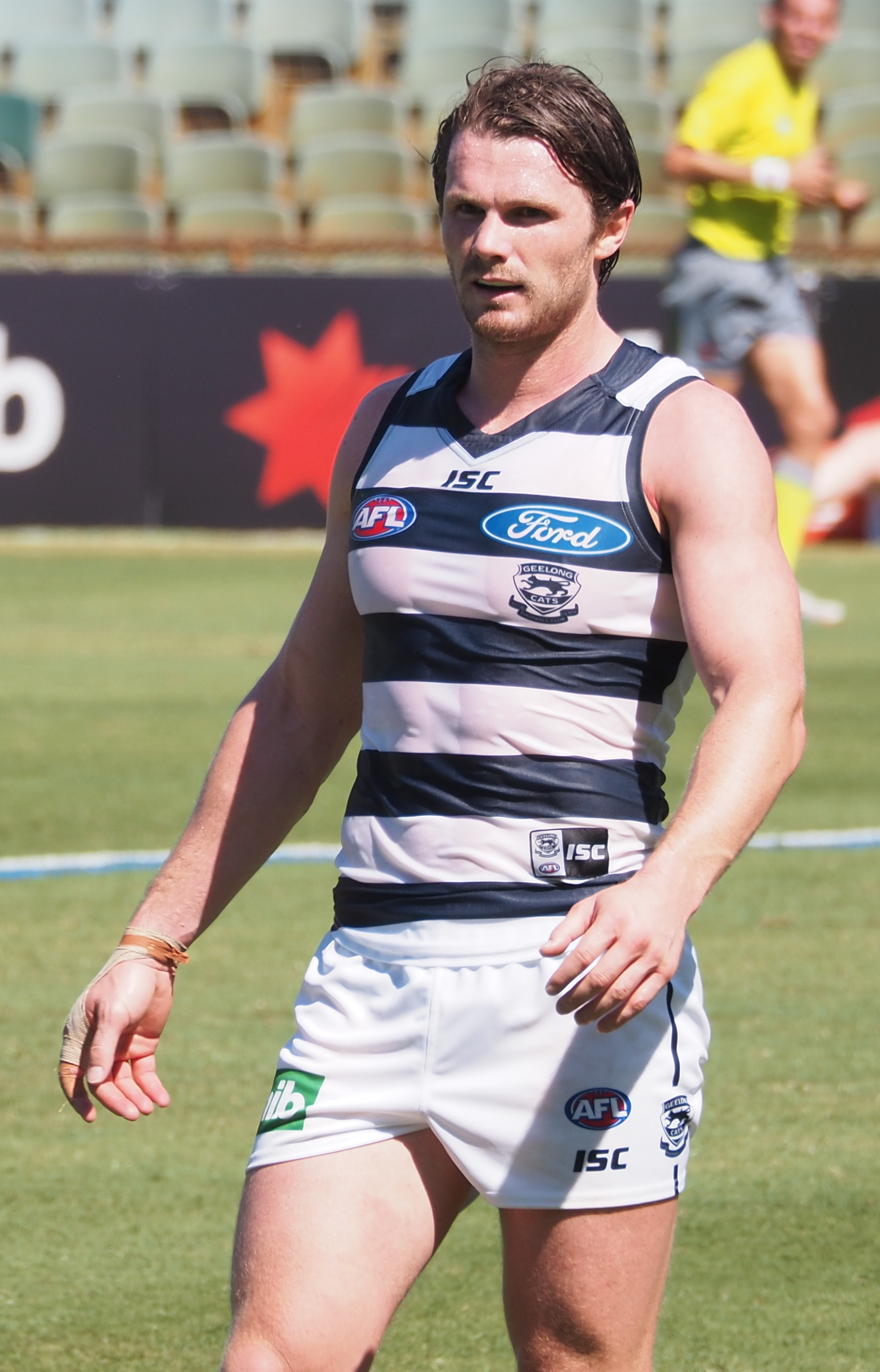
Originally a restricted free agent, Patrick Dangerfield was traded to Geelong from Adelaide

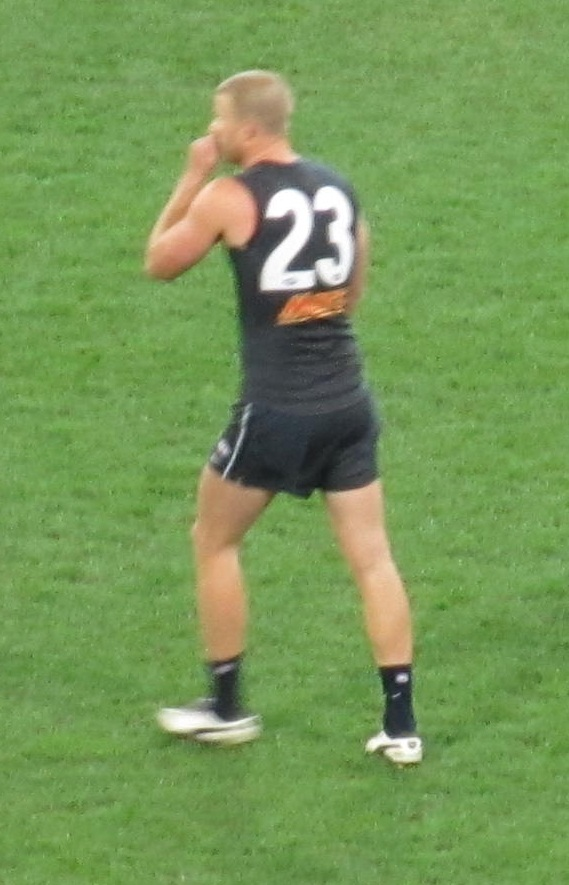
Lachie Henderson became the first player in history to be traded for a future draft pick when he was traded to Geelong from Carlton

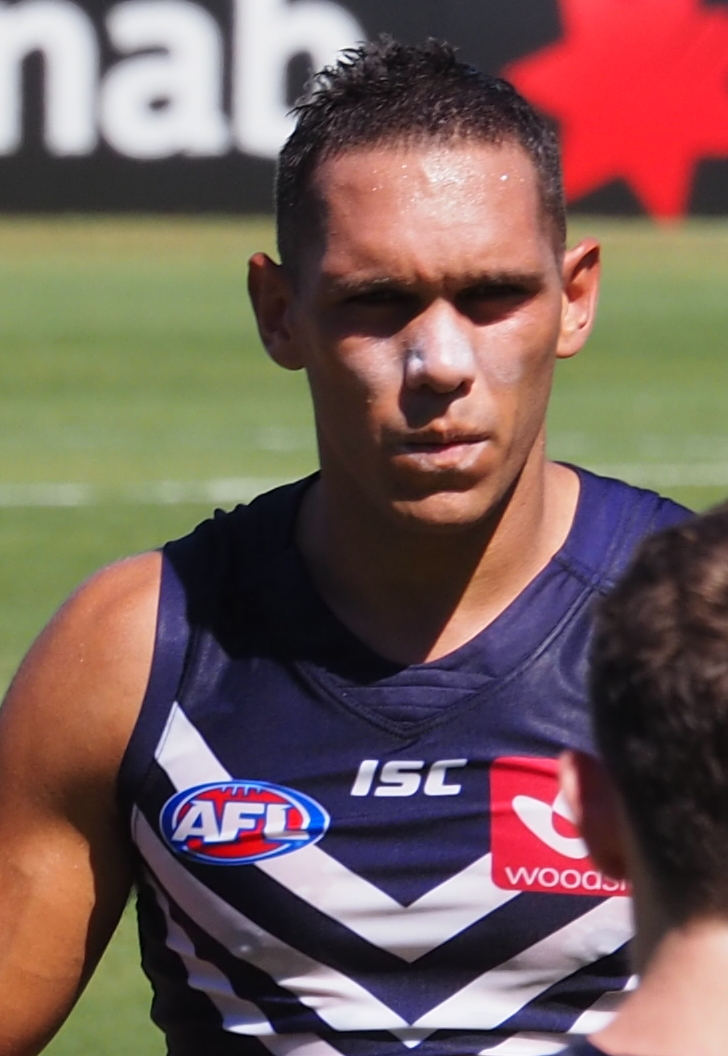
Highly rated youngster, Harley Bennell was traded to Fremantle from Gold Coast

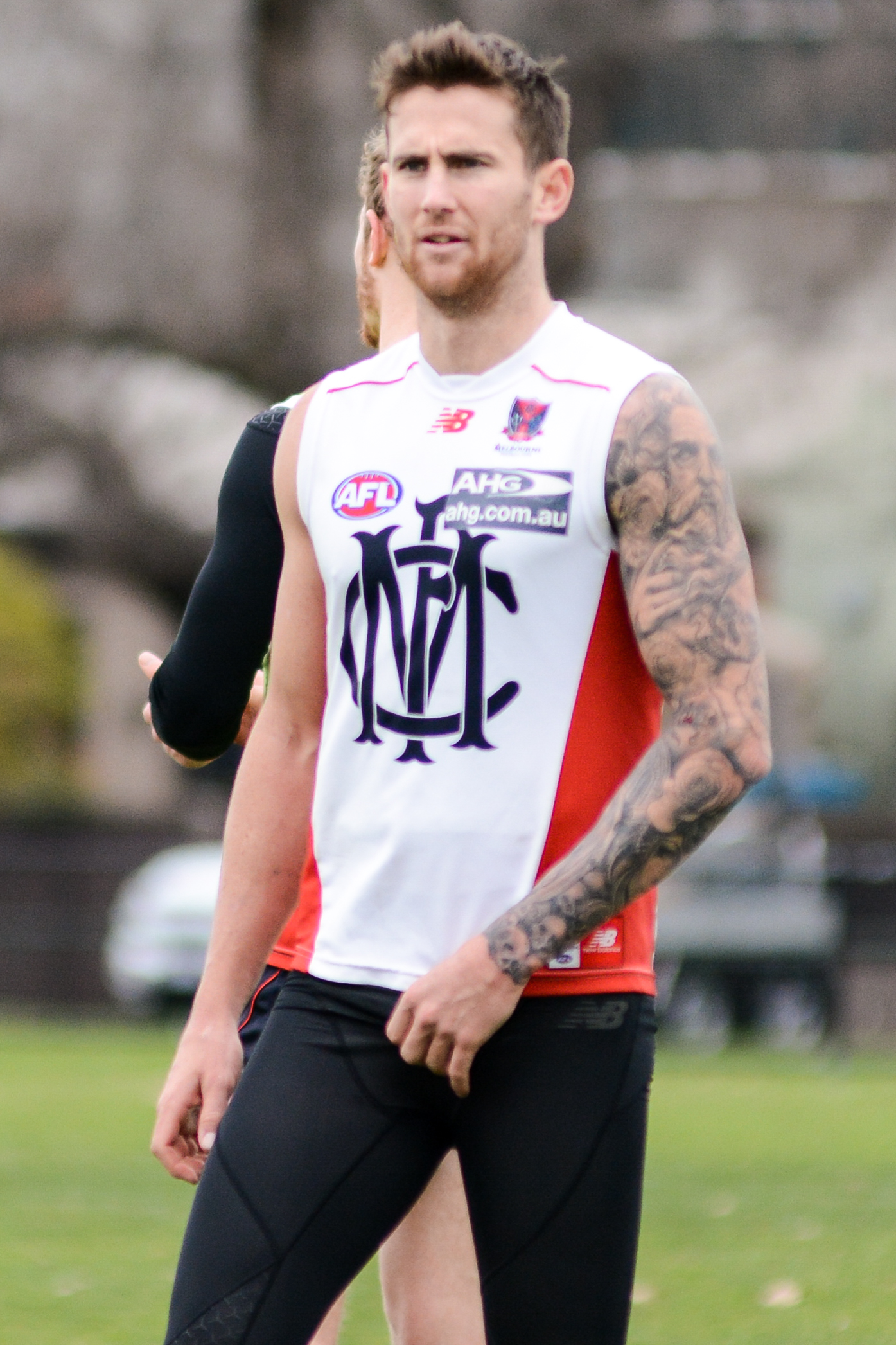
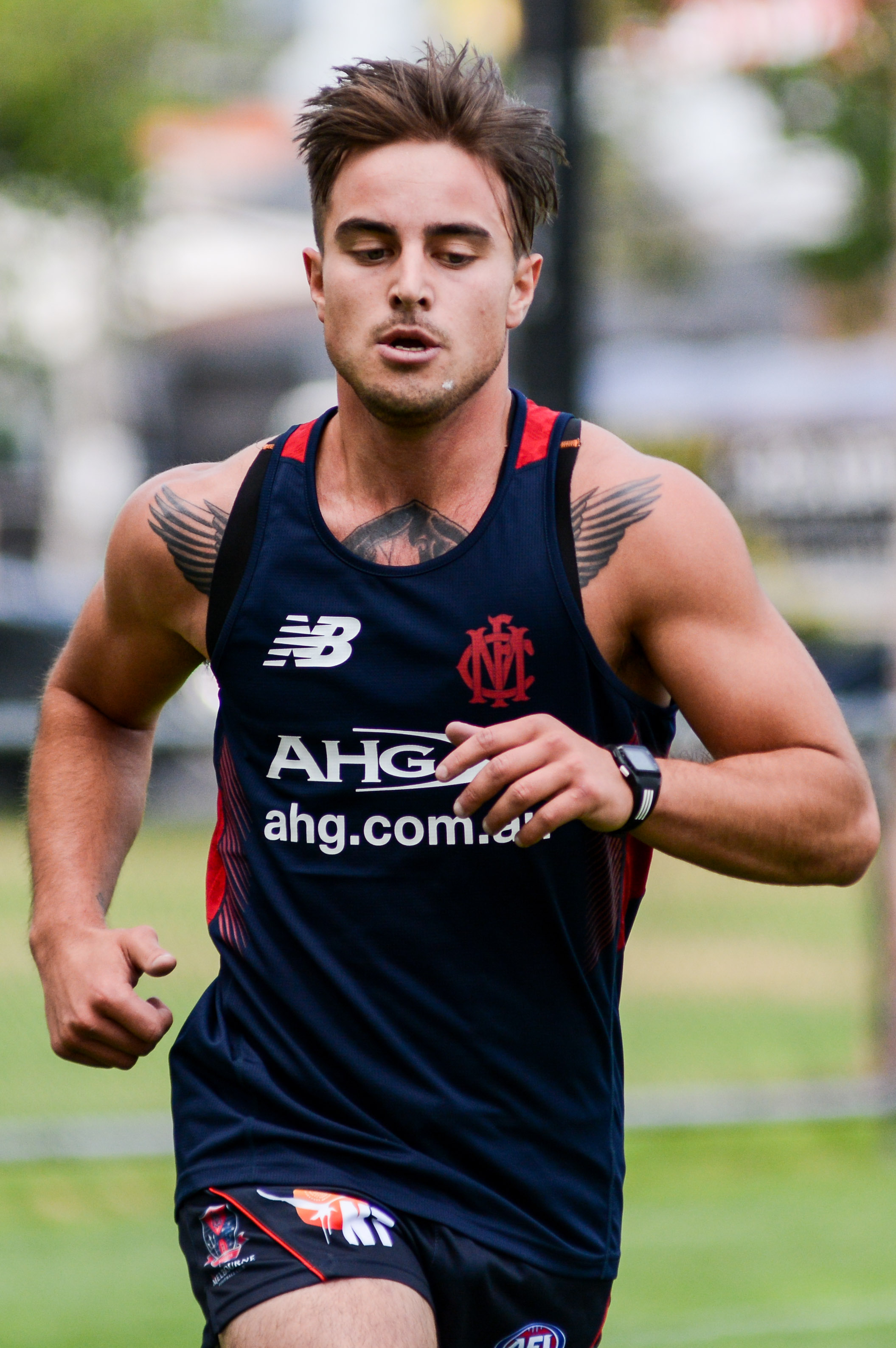
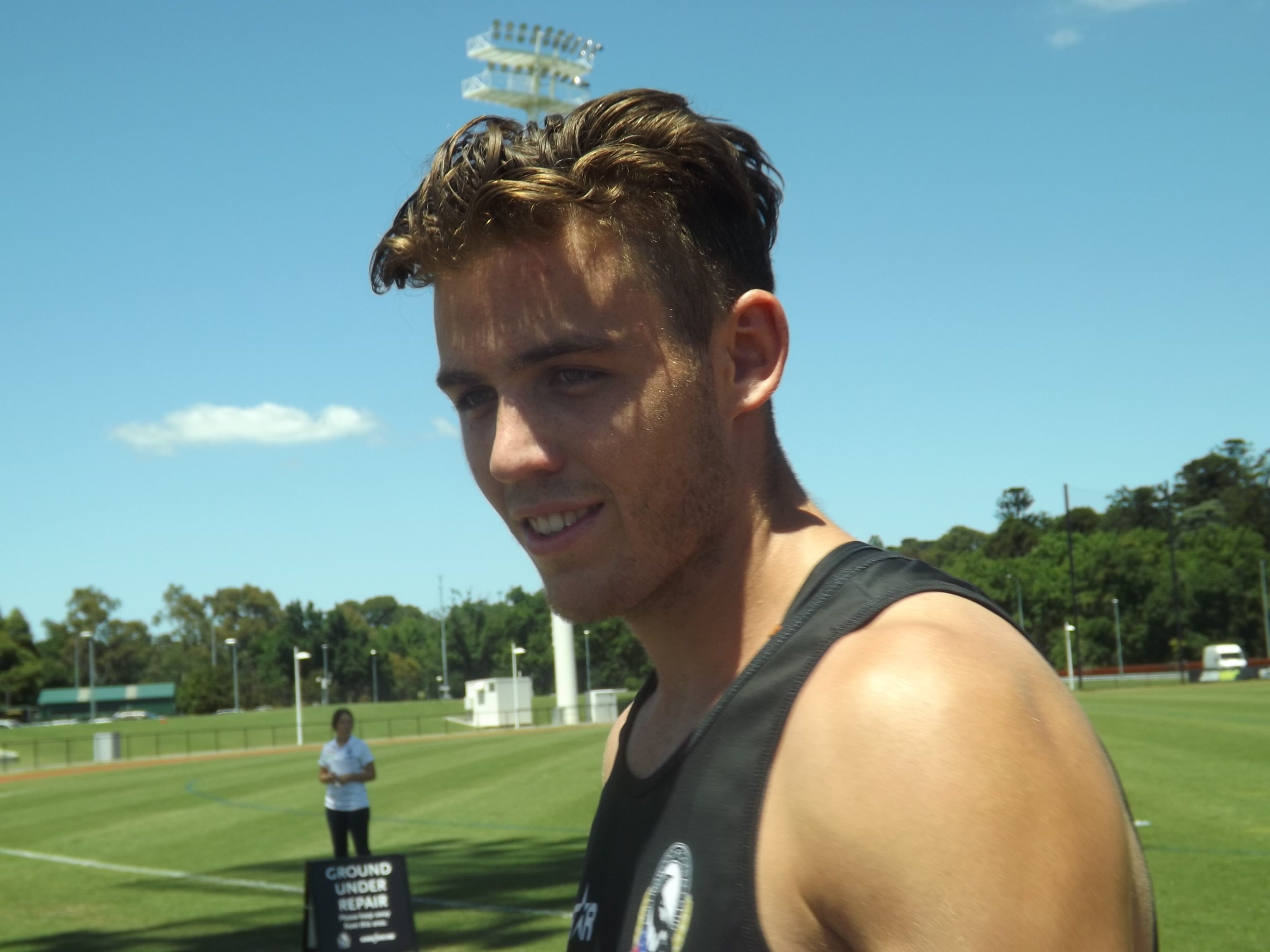
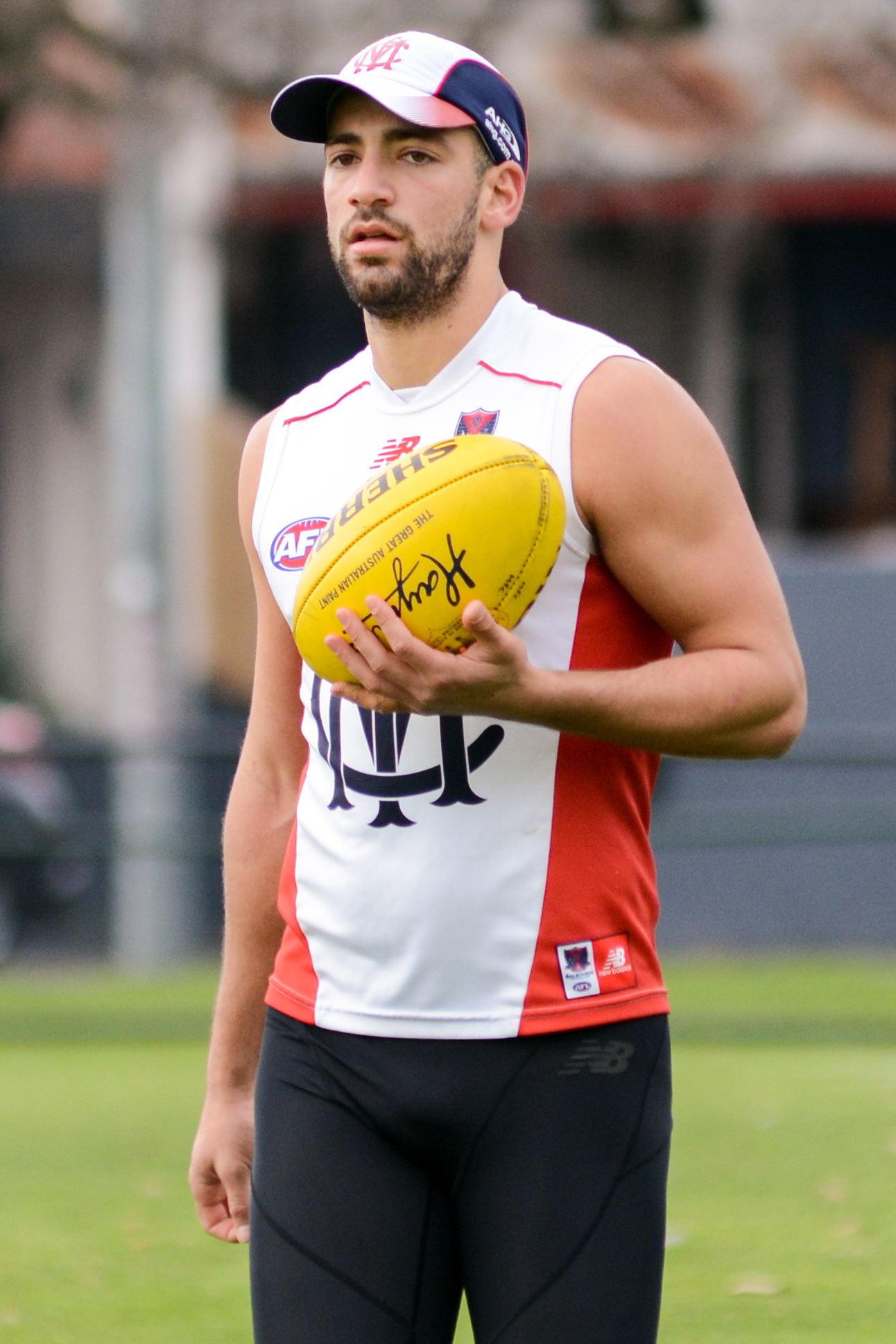
Jeremy Howe, Ben Kennedy, Paul Seedsman, and Jimmy Toumpas were all involved in a major deal involving four clubs.

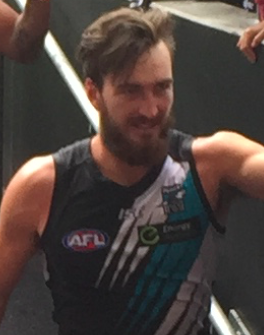
Charlie Dixon was traded to Port Adelaide from Gold Coast

For the first time, clubs were allowed to trade future selections from the next year's draft as well as the current draft. Geelong became the first AFL club to trade a future draft pick on 14 October 2015 when they traded their 2016 first round pick to Carlton for Lachie Henderson.

2015 AFL trade period
#	Player(s)	Traded from	Traded to	Traded for	Ref
1	Patrick Dangerfield	Adelaide	Geelong	Dean Gore	
1	Patrick Dangerfield	Adelaide	Geelong	Pick 9	
1	Pick 50	Adelaide	Geelong	Pick 28	
2	Jack Redden	Brisbane Lions	West Coast	Pick 17	
3	Lachie Henderson	Carlton	Geelong	2016 first round pick (Geelong)	
4	Harley Bennell	Gold Coast	Fremantle	Pick 16	
4	Pick 22	Gold Coast	Fremantle	Pick 35	
5	Lewis Jetta	Sydney	West Coast	Callum Sinclair	
6	Jake Melksham	Essendon	Melbourne	Pick 25	
7	Jed Anderson	Hawthorn	North Melbourne	Pick 15	
7	Pick 38	Hawthorn	North Melbourne	Pick 15	
7	Pick 40	Hawthorn	North Melbourne	Pick 55	
8	Curtly Hampton	Greater Western Sydney	Adelaide	2016 second round pick (Adelaide)	
9	Jacob Townsend	Greater Western Sydney	Richmond	Pick 70	
9	Pick 120	Greater Western Sydney	Richmond	Pick 70	
10	Tom Bell	Carlton	Brisbane Lions	Pick 21	
10	Pick 41	Carlton	Brisbane Lions	Pick 60	
11	Josh Walker	Geelong	Brisbane Lions	2016 third round pick (Brisbane Lions)	
11	Jarrad Jansen	Geelong	Brisbane Lions	2016 third round pick (Brisbane Lions)	
12	Zac Smith	Gold Coast	Geelong	Pick 49	
12	Zac Smith	Gold Coast	Geelong	Pick 53	
13	Daniel Currie	North Melbourne	Gold Coast	Pick 53	
14	Steve Johnson	Geelong	Greater Western Sydney	2016 fifth round pick (Greater Western Sydney)	
15	Jonathan Giles	Essendon	West Coast	Pick 57	
15	Pick 62	Essendon	West Coast	Pick 57	
16	Paul Seedsman	Collingwood	Adelaide	Pick 32	
16	Jeremy Howe	Melbourne	Collingwood	Ben Kennedy	
16	Pick 68	Port Adelaide	Collingwood	Paul Seedsman	
16	Pick 29	Port Adelaide	Melbourne	Jimmy Toumpas	
16	Pick 50	Port Adelaide	Melbourne	Jimmy Toumpas	
16	Ben Kennedy	Collingwood	Melbourne	Jeremy Howe	
16	Jimmy Toumpas	Melbourne	Port Adelaide	Pick 29	
16	Jimmy Toumpas	Melbourne	Port Adelaide	Pick 50	
16	Pick 32	Adelaide	Port Adelaide	Pick 68	
17	Nathan Freeman	Collingwood	St Kilda	2016 second round pick (St Kilda)	
17	Pick 68	Collingwood	St Kilda	Pick 63	
18	Charlie Dixon	Gold Coast	Port Adelaide	Pick 10	
18	Pick 49	Gold Coast	Port Adelaide	2016 second round pick (Port Adelaide)	
18	Pick 19	Gold Coast	Richmond	Pick 31	
18	Pick 19	Gold Coast	Richmond	2016 second round pick (Richmond)	
19	Jake Carlisle	Essendon	St Kilda	Pick 5	
19	Pick 14	Sydney	St Kilda	Pick 24	
19	Craig Bird	Sydney	Essendon	Pick 23	
19	Craig Bird	Sydney	Essendon	Pick 44	
19	Pick 5	St Kilda	Essendon	Jake Carlisle	
19	Pick 24	St Kilda	Essendon	Jake Carlisle	
19	Pick 23	Essendon	Sydney	Craig Bird	
19	Pick 44	Essendon	Sydney	Pick 14	
20	Pick 3	Gold Coast	Melbourne	Pick 6	
20	Pick 10	Gold Coast	Melbourne	Pick 29	
20	Pick 43	Gold Coast	Melbourne	2016 first round pick (Melbourne)	
21	Matt Rosa	West Coast	Gold Coast	Pick 31	
22	Sam Kerridge	Adelaide	Carlton	Troy Menzel	
22	Pick 28	Adelaide	Carlton	Troy Menzel	
23	Jed Lamb	Greater Western Sydney	Carlton	Pick 28	
23	Andrew Phillips	Greater Western Sydney	Carlton	Pick 77	
23	Lachie Plowman	Greater Western Sydney	Carlton	Pick 95	
23	Liam Sumner	Greater Western Sydney	Carlton	2016 first round pick (Geelong)	
23	Pick 8	Greater Western Sydney	Carlton	2016 first round pick (Geelong)	
24	Adam Treloar	Greater Western Sydney	Collingwood	Pick 7	
24	Adam Treloar	Greater Western Sydney	Collingwood	Pick 65	
24	Pick 28	Greater Western Sydney	Collingwood	2016 first round pick (Collingwood)	
25	Jack Fitzpatrick	Melbourne	Hawthorn	Pick 94	
26	Tomas Bugg	Greater Western Sydney	Melbourne	Pick 10	
26	Tomas Bugg	Greater Western Sydney	Melbourne	Pick 43	
26	Pick 7	Greater Western Sydney	Melbourne	Pick 64	
27	Pick 55	Hawthorn	Greater Western Sydney	Pick 48	
27	Pick 58	Hawthorn	Greater Western Sydney	Pick 48	
28	James Aish	Brisbane Lions	Collingwood	Pick 26	
28	James Aish	Brisbane Lions	Collingwood	2016 second round pick (St Kilda)	
28	Pick 28	Collingwood	North Melbourne	Pick 34	
28	Pick 47	Collingwood	North Melbourne	Pick 53	
28	Ryan Bastinac	North Melbourne	Brisbane Lions	Pick 17	
28	Pick 38	North Melbourne	Brisbane Lions	Pick 17	
28	Pick 40	North Melbourne	Brisbane Lions	Pick 26	
28	2016 third round pick	North Melbourne	Brisbane Lions	Pick 26	
29	Pick 23	Sydney	West Coast	Pick 36	
29	Pick 23	Sydney	West Coast	Pick 37	
30	Pick 11	Western Bulldogs	Carlton	Pick 20	
30	2016 third round pick	Western Bulldogs	Carlton	Pick 21	
31	Chris Yarran	Carlton	Richmond	Pick 19	
32	Pick 27	Greater Western Sydney	Collingwood	Pick 34	
32	Pick 66	Greater Western Sydney	Collingwood	Pick 34	
32	Pick 77	Greater Western Sydney	Collingwood	Pick 53	
32	Pick 84	Greater Western Sydney	Collingwood	Pick 63	
33	Michael Talia	Western Bulldogs	Sydney	2016 fourth round pick (Sydney)	
33	Pick 69	Western Bulldogs	Sydney	2016 fourth round pick (Sydney)	
34	Pick 35	Gold Coast	Fremantle	Pick 56	
34	Pick 61	Gold Coast	Fremantle	2016 second round pick (Fremantle)	

Note

- The numbering of the draft picks in this list may be different from the agreed draft picks at the time of the trade, due to adjustments from either the insertion of free agency compensation draft picks or clubs exiting the draft before later rounds.

=== Retirements and delistings ===
List of 2015 AFL player changes

Name	Club	Date	Notes
Daniel Flynn	Port Adelaide	30 January 2015	Quit, returned to Ireland
Beau Waters	West Coast	19 February 2015	Retired due to ongoing injury, effective immediately
Timmy Sumner	Gold Coast	8 April 2015	Retired, effective immediately
Colin Sylvia	Fremantle	28 April 2015	Retired, effective immediately
Brad Hartman	Geelong	1 May 2015	Retired, effective immediately
Brent Reilly	Adelaide	13 May 2015	Retired due to head injury, effective immediately
Kane Cornes	Port Adelaide	14 May 2015	Retired, effective after round 8
James Toohey	Geelong	14 May 2015	Retired, effective immediately
Chris Judd	Carlton	9 June 2015	Retired due to knee injury, effective immediately
Matt Maguire	Brisbane Lions	23 June 2015	Retired due to ongoing concussion, effective immediately
Nathan Grima	North Melbourne	8 July 2015	Retired due to back injury, effective immediately
Hamish McIntosh	Geelong	29 July 2015	Retired due to ongoing injury, effective immediately
Leigh Adams	North Melbourne	1 August 2015	Retired due to ongoing concussion, effective immediately
Lachlan Keeffe	Collingwood	10 August 2015	Delisted due to testing positive to a banned substance
Josh Thomas	Collingwood	10 August 2015	Delisted due to testing positive to a banned substance
Nathan Foley	Richmond	13 August 2015	Retired due to ongoing injury, effective immediately
Chris Newman	Richmond	18 August 2015	Retired, effective at the end of the season
Rhyce Shaw	Sydney	20 August 2015	Retired, effective at the end of the season
Jed Adcock	Brisbane Lions	20 August 2015	Delisted
Jared Rivers	Geelong	24 August 2015	Retired due to knee injury, effective immediately
Sam Siggins	Adelaide	24 August 2015	Delisted, left club for personal reasons
Adam Schneider	St Kilda	25 August 2015	Retired, effective after round 22
Paul Chapman	Essendon	25 August 2015	Retired, effective after round 22
Brent Staker	Brisbane Lions	26 August 2015	Retired, effective at the end of the season
Chris Knights	Richmond	27 August 2015	Retired, effective at the end of the season
Andrew Raines	Gold Coast	28 August 2015	Retired, effective immediately
Sam Blease	Geelong	31 August 2015	Retired due to head injury, effective immediately
Andrew Carrazzo	Carlton	1 September 2015	Retired, effective at the end of the season
Mathew Stokes	Geelong	1 September 2015	Delisted
Daniel Cross	Melbourne	2 September 2015	Retired, effective at the end of the season
Greg Broughton	Gold Coast	2 September 2015	Retired, effective at the end of the season
James Kelly	Geelong	2 September 2015	Delisted
Ricky Petterd	Richmond	3 September 2015	Retired due to foot injury, effective immediately
Luke McGuane	Brisbane Lions	3 September 2015	Retired due to knee injury, effective immediately
David Ellard	Carlton	4 September 2015	Retired, effective at the end of the season
Dustin Fletcher	Essendon	4 September 2015	Retired, effective immediately
Steve Johnson	Geelong	4 September 2015	Delisted
Jason Winderlich	Essendon	6 September 2015	Retired
Josh Hall	Gold Coast	8 September 2015	Quit, signed to play rugby league
Tyrone Downie	Gold Coast	8 September 2015	Delisted
Jarred Ellis	Gold Coast	8 September 2015	Delisted
Louis Herbert	Gold Coast	8 September 2015	Delisted
Mark Jamar	Melbourne	11 September 2015	Delisted
Tony Armstrong	Collingwood	14 September 2015	Delisted
Sam Dwyer	Collingwood	14 September 2015	Delisted
Michael Manteit	Collingwood	14 September 2015	Delisted
Clinton Young	Collingwood	14 September 2015	Delisted
Jordon Bourke	Brisbane Lions	14 September 2015	Delisted
Mitch Golby	Brisbane Lions	14 September 2015	Delisted
Ayce Cordy	Western Bulldogs	15 September 2015	Delisted
Sam Darley	Western Bulldogs	15 September 2015	Delisted
Matt Fuller	Western Bulldogs	15 September 2015	Delisted
Brett Goodes	Western Bulldogs	15 September 2015	Delisted
Jordan Kelly	Western Bulldogs	15 September 2015	Delisted
Daniel Pearce	Western Bulldogs	15 September 2015	Delisted
Matthew Arnot	Richmond	15 September 2015	Delisted
Matthew McDonough	Richmond	15 September 2015	Delisted
Tom Logan	Port Adelaide	17 September 2015	Retired
Mitch Harvey	Port Adelaide	17 September 2015	Delisted
Jarrad Redden	Port Adelaide	17 September 2015	Delisted
Sam Russell	Port Adelaide	17 September 2015	Delisted
Mason Shaw	Port Adelaide	17 September 2015	Delisted
Johann Wagner	Port Adelaide	17 September 2015	Delisted
Rohan Bail	Melbourne	18 September 2015	Delisted
Jack Fitzpatrick	Melbourne	18 September 2015	Delisted
Jordie McKenzie	Melbourne	18 September 2015	Delisted
Aidan Riley	Melbourne	18 September 2015	Delisted
Cameron Giles	Carlton	18 September 2015	Delisted
Blaine Johnson	Carlton	18 September 2015	Delisted
Fraser Russell	Carlton	18 September 2015	Delisted
Matthew Watson	Carlton	18 September 2015	Delisted
Adam Goodes	Sydney	19 September 2015	Retired
Daniel Markworth	St Kilda	22 September 2015	Delisted
Tom Simpkin	St Kilda	22 September 2015	Delisted
Arryn Siposs	St Kilda	22 September 2015	Delisted
Spencer White	St Kilda	22 September 2015	Delisted
Patrick Karnezis	Collingwood	22 September 2015	Retired
Kurt Aylett	Essendon	22 September 2015	Delisted
Lauchlan Dalgleish	Essendon	22 September 2015	Delisted
James Podsiadly	Adelaide	25 September 2015	Retired
Scott McMahon	North Melbourne	29 September 2015	Delisted
Eric Wallace	North Melbourne	29 September 2015	Delisted
Max Warren	North Melbourne	29 September 2015	Delisted
Luke McPharlin	Fremantle	30 September 2015	Retired
Brodie Martin	Adelaide	30 September 2015	Delisted
Jack Osborn	Adelaide	30 September 2015	Delisted
Anthony Wilson	Adelaide	30 September 2015	Delisted
Brian Lake	Hawthorn	6 October 2015	Retired
David Hale	Hawthorn	6 October 2015	Retired
Will Maginness	West Coast	6 October 2015	Delisted
Dylan Main	West Coast	6 October 2015	Delisted
Rowen Powell	West Coast	6 October 2015	Delisted
Paul Duffield	Fremantle	8 October 2015	Retired
Jacob Ballard	Fremantle	8 October 2015	Delisted
Ryan Crowley	Fremantle	8 October 2015	Delisted
Josh Deluca	Fremantle	8 October 2015	Delisted
Max Duffy	Fremantle	8 October 2015	Delisted
Craig Moller	Fremantle	8 October 2015	Delisted
Sam Grimley	Hawthorn	8 October 2015	Delisted
Jared Hardisty	Hawthorn	8 October 2015	Delisted
Alex Woodward	Hawthorn	8 October 2015	Delisted
Tom Vandeleur	Fremantle	9 October 2015	Delisted
Mike Pyke	Sydney	16 October 2015	Retired
Jarrad Grant	Western Bulldogs	23 October 2015	Delisted
Andrew Moore	Port Adelaide	23 October 2015	Delisted
Zac O'Brien	Brisbane Lions	26 October 2015	Delisted
Jackson Paine	Brisbane Lions	26 October 2015	Delisted
Alex Browne	Essendon	27 October 2015	Delisted
Elliott Kavanagh	Essendon	27 October 2015	Delisted
Matthew Wright	Adelaide	28 October 2015	Delisted
Matt Thomas	Richmond	28 October 2015	Retired
Matt Dea	Richmond	28 October 2015	Delisted
Nathan Gordon	Richmond	28 October 2015	Delisted
Tom Fields	Carlton	28 October 2015	Delisted
Nick Holman	Carlton	28 October 2015	Delisted
Brad Walsh	Carlton	28 October 2015	Delisted
Robert Warnock	Carlton	28 October 2015	Delisted
Kane Mitchell	Port Adelaide	28 October 2015	Delisted
Majak Daw	North Melbourne	29 October 2015	Delisted
Kieran Harper	North Melbourne	29 October 2015	Delisted
Josh Glenn	Gold Coast	29 October 2015	Delisted
Daniel Gorringe	Gold Coast	29 October 2015	Delisted
Danny Stanley	Gold Coast	29 October 2015	Delisted
Farren Ray	St Kilda	30 October 2015	Delisted
Ahmed Saad	St Kilda	30 October 2015	Delisted
Josh Saunders	St Kilda	30 October 2015	Delisted
Ariel Steinberg	Essendon	30 October 2015	Delisted
Harrison Marsh	Sydney	30 October 2015	Delisted
Sean McLaren	Sydney	30 October 2015	Delisted
Lloyd Perris	Sydney	30 October 2015	Delisted
Jonathan Simpkin	Hawthorn	30 October 2015	Delisted
Dylan Addison	Greater Western Sydney	30 October 2015	Retired
Tim Golds	Greater Western Sydney	30 October 2015	Delisted
Sam Schulz	Greater Western Sydney	30 October 2015	Delisted
Anthony Morabito	Fremantle	30 October 2015	Delisted
Brant Colledge	West Coast	30 October 2015	Delisted
Murray Newman	West Coast	30 October 2015	Delisted
Simon Tunbridge	West Coast	30 October 2015	Delisted
Alec Waterman	West Coast	30 October 2015	Delisted
Brenden Abbott	Collingwood	30 October 2015	Delisted
Andrew Boston	Gold Coast	2 November 2015	Retired
Nick O'Brien	Essendon	5 November 2015	Delisted
Will Hams	Essendon	5 November 2015	Delisted
Viv Michie	Melbourne	10 November 2015	Delisted

== 2015 national draft ==
The 2015 AFL national draft was held on 24 November 2015 at the Adelaide Convention Centre. For the first time, live bidding occurred during the draft for selections made under the father–son rule and from the northern state's development academies, whereby each draft selection is allocated a points value. Clubs nominating a player were forced to use their existing draft selections to match the points value of the pick used by the club bidding for the player.

^	Denotes player who has been inducted to the Australian Football Hall of Fame
*	Denotes player who has been a premiership player and been selected for at least one All-Australian team
^{+}	Denotes player who has been a premiership player at least once
^{x}	Denotes player who has been selected for at least one All-Australian team
^{#}	Denotes player who has never played in a VFL/AFL home and away season or finals game
^{~}	Denotes player who has been selected as Rising Star

Final draft order

Draft-eve selection order, club by club, and points value of each pick

Round	Pick	Points	Club	Notes
1	1	3000	Carlton	
1	2	2517	Brisbane Lions	
1	3	2234	Melbourne	Traded from Gold Coast
1	4	2034	Essendon	
1	5	1878	Essendon	Traded by St Kilda
1	6	1751	Gold Coast	Traded from Melbourne
1	7	1644	Melbourne	Traded from Greater Western Sydney; received from Collingwood
1	8	1551	Carlton	Traded from Greater Western Sydney
1	9	1469	Adelaide	Traded from Geelong
1	10	1395	Greater Western Sydney	Traded from Melbourne; received from Gold Coast, received from Port Adelaide
1	11	1329	Carlton	Traded from Western Bulldogs
1	12	1268	Richmond	
1	13	1212	Adelaide	
1	14	1161	St Kilda	Traded by Sydney
1	15	1112	Hawthorn	Traded from North Melbourne
1	16	1067	Gold Coast	Traded from Fremantle
1	17	1025	North Melbourne	Traded from Brisbane Lions; received from West Coast
1	18	985	Hawthorn	
1	19	948	Carlton	Traded from Richmond; received from Gold Coast; received from Greater Western Sydney via a trade in 2012; traded to the Giants by Fremantle in 2011; originally received by Fremantle as compensation for Rhys Palmer.
2	20	912	Western Bulldogs	Traded from Carlton
2	21	878	Western Bulldogs	Traded from Carlton; received from Brisbane Lions
2	22	845	Fremantle	Traded from Gold Coast
2	23	815	West Coast	Traded from Sydney; received from Essendon
2	24	785	Essendon	Traded by St Kilda
2	25	756	Essendon	Traded from Melbourne
2	26	729	North Melbourne	Traded from Brisbane Lions; received from Collingwood
2	27	703	Collingwood	Traded from Greater Western Sydney
2	28	677	North Melbourne	Traded from Collingwood; received from Greater Western Sydney; received from Carlton; received from Adelaide; received from Geelong
2	29	653	Gold Coast	Traded from Gold Coast, received from Port Adelaide
2	30	629	Western Bulldogs	
2	31	606	West Coast	Traded from Gold Coast; received from Richmond
2	32	584	Port Adelaide	Traded from Adelaide
2	33	563	Sydney	
2	34	542	Greater Western Sydney	Traded from Collingwood; received from North Melbourne
2	35	522	Fremantle	Traded from Gold Coast; received from Fremantle
2	36	502	Sydney	Traded from West Coast
2	37	483	Sydney	Traded from West Coast; free agency compensation pick (Selwood)
2	38	465	Brisbane Lions	Traded from North Melbourne; received from Hawthorn
2	39	446	Brisbane Lions	Free agency compensation pick (Leuenberger)
2	40	429	Brisbane Lions	Traded from North Melbourne; received from Hawthorn; free agency compensation pick (Suckling)
3	41	412	Brisbane Lions	Traded from Carlton
3	42	395	Brisbane Lions	
3	43	378	Greater Western Sydney	Traded from Melbourne; received from Gold Coast
3	44	362	Sydney	Traded by Essendon
3	45	347	St Kilda	
3	46	331	Melbourne	
3	47	316	North Melbourne	Traded from Collingwood
3	48	302	Hawthorn	Traded from Greater Western Sydney
3	49	287	Port Adelaide	Traded from Gold Coast; received from Geelong
3	50	273	Melbourne	Traded from Port Adelaide
3	51	259	Western Bulldogs	
3	52	246	Richmond	
3	53	233	Greater Western Sydney	Traded from Collingwood; received from North Melbourne; received from Gold Coast; received from Geelong; received from Adelaide
3	54	220	Sydney	
3	55	207	Greater Western Sydney	Traded from Hawthorn; received from North Melbourne
3	56	194	Gold Coast	Traded from Fremantle
3	57	182	Essendon	Traded from West Coast
3	58	170	Greater Western Sydney	Traded from Hawthorn
4	59	158	Carlton	
4	60	146	Carlton	Traded from Brisbane Lions
4	61	135	Fremantle	Traded from Gold Coast
4	62	123	West Coast	Traded from Essendon
4	63	112	Greater Western Sydney	Traded from Collingwood; received from St Kilda
4	64	101	Greater Western Sydney	Traded from Melbourne
4	65	90	Greater Western Sydney	Traded from Collingwood
4	66	80	Collingwood	Traded from Greater Western Sydney
4	67	69	Geelong	
4	68	59	St Kilda	Traded from Collingwood; received from Port Adelaide
4	69	49	Sydney	Traded from Western Bulldogs
4	70	39	Greater Western Sydney	Traded from Richmond
4	71	29	Adelaide	
4	72	19	Sydney	
4	73	9	North Melbourne	
4	74	0	Fremantle	
4	75	0	West Coast	
4	76	0	Hawthorn	
5	77	0	Collingwood	Traded from Greater Western Sydney; received from Carlton
5	78	0	Brisbane Lions	
5	79	0	Gold Coast	
5	80	0	Essendon	
5	81	0	St Kilda	
5	82	0	Melbourne	
5	83	0	Collingwood	
5	84	0	Collingwood	Traded from Greater Western Sydney
5	85	0	Geelong	
5	86	0	Port Adelaide	
5	87	0	Western Bulldogs	
5	88	0	Richmond	
5	89	0	Adelaide	
5	90	0	Sydney	
5	91	0	North Melbourne	
5	92	0	Fremantle	
5	93	0	West Coast	
5	94	0	Melbourne	Traded from Hawthorn
6	95	0	Greater Western Sydney	Traded from Carlton
6	96	0	Brisbane Lions	
6	97	0	Gold Coast	
6	98	0	Essendon	
6	99	0	St Kilda	
6	100	0	Melbourne	
6	101	0	Collingwood	
6	102	0	Greater Western Sydney	
6	103	0	Geelong	
6	104	0	Port Adelaide	
6	105	0	Western Bulldogs	
6	106	0	Richmond	
6	107	0	Adelaide	
6	108	0	Sydney	
6	109	0	North Melbourne	
6	110	0	Fremantle	
6	111	0	West Coast	
6	112	0	Hawthorn	
7	113	0	Carlton	
7	114	0	Brisbane Lions	
7	115	0	Gold Coast	
7	116	0	Essendon	
7	117	0	St Kilda	
7	118	0	Melbourne	
7	119	0	Collingwood	
7	120	0	Richmond	Traded from Greater Western Sydney
7	121	0	Geelong	
7	122	0	Port Adelaide	
7	123	0	Western Bulldogs	
7	124	0	Richmond	
7	125	0	Adelaide	
7	126	0	Sydney	
7	127	0	North Melbourne	
7	128	0	Fremantle	
7	129	0	West Coast	
7	130	0	Hawthorn	

Round	Pick	Player	Drafted to	Recruited from	League	Notes
1	1	Jacob Weitering	Carlton	Dandenong Stingrays	TAC Cup	
1	2	Josh Schache	Brisbane Lions	Murray Bushrangers	TAC Cup	
1	3	Callum Mills	Sydney	North Shore	Sydney AFL	Academy player; Melbourne's bid matched with picks 33, 36, 37 and 43
1	4	Clayton Oliver	Melbourne	Murray Bushrangers	TAC Cup	Traded from Gold Coast
1	5	Darcy Parish	Essendon	Geelong Falcons	TAC Cup	
1	6	Aaron Francis	Essendon	West Adelaide	SANFL	Traded from St Kilda
1	7	Jacob Hopper	Greater Western Sydney	North Ballarat Rebels	TAC Cup	Academy player; Gold Coast's bid matched with pick 11
1	8	Callum Ah Chee	Gold Coast	South Fremantle	WAFL	Traded from Melbourne
1	9	Sam Weideman	Melbourne	Eastern Ranges	TAC Cup	Traded from Greater Western Sydney; received from Collingwood
1	10	Harry McKay	Carlton	Gippsland Power	TAC Cup	Traded from Greater Western Sydney
1	11	Wayne Milera	Adelaide	Central District	SANFL	Traded from Geelong
1	12	Charlie Curnow	Carlton	Geelong Falcons	TAC Cup	Traded from Western Bulldogs
1	13	Matthew Kennedy	Greater Western Sydney	Collingullie-Glenfield Park	RFNL	Academy player; Richmond's bid matched with picks 34 and 40
1	14	Eric Hipwood	Brisbane Lions	Aspley	NEAFL	Academy player; Richmond's bid matched with picks 36 and 37
1	15	Daniel Rioli	Richmond	North Ballarat Rebels	TAC Cup	
1	16	Harry Himmelberg	Greater Western Sydney	Mangoplah-CUE	RFNL	Academy player; Adelaide's bid matched with picks 48, 50, 55 and 59
1	17	Tom Doedee	Adelaide	Geelong Falcons	TAC Cup	
1	18	Jade Gresham	St Kilda	Northern Knights	TAC Cup	Traded from Sydney
1	19	Ryan Burton	Hawthorn	North Adelaide	SANFL	Traded from North Melbourne
1	20	Brayden Fiorini	Gold Coast	Northern Knights	TAC Cup	Traded from Fremantle
1	21	Ben McKay	North Melbourne	Gippsland Power	TAC Cup	Traded from Brisbane Lions; received from West Coast
1	22	Kieran Lovell	Hawthorn	Kingborough	TSL	
1	23	David Cuningham	Carlton	Oakleigh Chargers	TAC Cup	Traded from Richmond; received from Gold Coast; received from Greater Western Sydney via a trade in 2012; received from Fremantle in 2011; compensation pick from 2011 (Palmer)
2	24	Ben Keays	Brisbane Lions	Brisbane	NEAFL	Academy player; Western Bulldogs' bid matched with Brisbane's next pick
2	25	Josh Dunkley	Western Bulldogs	Gippsland Power	TAC Cup	Traded from Carlton; father-son eligible (son of Andrew Dunkley), but Sydney did not match bid
2	26	Kieran Collins	Western Bulldogs	Dandenong Stingrays	TAC Cup	Traded from Carlton; received from Brisbane Lions
2	27	Darcy Tucker	Fremantle	North Ballarat Rebels	TAC Cup	Traded from Gold Coast
2	28	Luke Partington	West Coast	Norwood	SANFL	Traded from Sydney; received from Essendon
2	29	Alex Morgan	Essendon	Oakleigh Chargers	TAC Cup	Traded from St Kilda
2	30	Mason Redman	Essendon	Glenelg	SANFL	Traded from Melbourne
2	31	Ryan Clarke	North Melbourne	Eastern Ranges	TAC Cup	Traded from Brisbane Lions; received from Collingwood
2	32	Brayden Sier	Collingwood	Northern Knights	TAC Cup	Traded from Greater Western Sydney
2	33	Mitchell Hibberd	North Melbourne	Clarence	TSL	Traded from Collingwood; received from Greater Western Sydney; received from Carlton; received from Adelaide; received from Geelong
2	34	Josh Schoenfeld	Gold Coast	Peel Thunder	WAFL	Traded from Gold Coast, received from Port Adelaide
2	35	Marcus Adams	Western Bulldogs	West Perth	WAFL	
2	36	Tom Cole	West Coast	Bendigo Pioneers	TAC Cup	Traded from Gold Coast; received from Richmond
2	37	Riley Bonner	Port Adelaide	West Adelaide	SANFL	Traded from Adelaide
2	38	Harley Balic	Fremantle	Sandringham Dragons	TAC Cup	Traded from Gold Coast; received from Fremantle
3	39	Rhys Mathieson	Brisbane Lions	Geelong Falcons	TAC Cup	Traded from North Melbourne; received from Hawthorn; free agency compensation pick (Suckling)
3	40	Brandon White	St Kilda	Dandenong Stingrays	TAC Cup	
3	41	Matt Flynn	Greater Western Sydney	Narrandera	RFNL	Academy player; Melbourne's bid matched with GWS' next pick
3	42	Mitch King	Melbourne	Murray Bushrangers	TAC Cup	
3	43	Corey Wagner	North Melbourne	Aspley	NEAFL	Traded from Collingwood; academy eligible, but Brisbane Lions did not match bid
3	44	Blake Hardwick	Hawthorn	Eastern Ranges	TAC Cup	Traded from Greater Western Sydney
3	45	Aidyn Johnson	Port Adelaide	Bendigo Pioneers	TAC Cup	Traded from Gold Coast; received from Geelong
3	46	Liam Hulett	Melbourne	Dandenong Stingrays	TAC Cup	Traded from Port Adelaide
3	47	Sam Skinner	Brisbane Lions	Gippsland Power	TAC Cup	Traded from Carlton
3	48	Bailey Williams	Western Bulldogs	Glenelg	SANFL	
3	49	Bailey Rice	St Kilda	Dandenong Stingrays	TAC Cup	Father–son rule selection (son of Dean Rice); Richmond's bid matched with St Kilda's next pick
3	50	Oleg Markov	Richmond	North Adelaide	SANFL	
3	51	Tyrone Leonardis	Sydney	Northern Knights	TAC Cup	Traded from Essendon
3	52	Mackenzie Willis	Gold Coast	Kingborough	TSL	Traded from Fremantle
3	53	Jack Silvagni	Carlton	Oakleigh Chargers	TAC Cup	Father–son rule selection (son of Stephen Silvagni); Essendon's bid matched with Carlton's next pick
3	54	Mitch Brown	Essendon	Sandringham	VFL	Traded from West Coast
4	55	Sam Collins	Fremantle	Box Hill	VFL	Traded from Gold Coast
4	56	Jordan Dawson	Sydney	Sturt	SANFL	
4	57	Kurt Mutimer	West Coast	Dandenong Stingrays	TAC Cup	Traded from Essendon
4	58	Tom Phillips	Collingwood	Oakleigh Chargers	TAC Cup	
4	59	Ryan Gardner	Geelong	Burnie	TSL	
4	60	Declan Mountford	North Melbourne	Claremont	WAFL	
4	61	Shane Yarran	Fremantle	Subiaco	WAFL	
4	62	Matthew Allen	West Coast	Glenelg	SANFL	
5	63	Rupert Wills	Collingwood	Collingwood	VFL	Traded from Greater Western Sydney; received from Carlton
5	64	Yestin Eades	Essendon	North Ballarat Rebels	TAC Cup	
5	65	Ben Crocker	Collingwood	Oakleigh Chargers	TAC Cup	
5	66	Sam Menegola	Geelong	Subiaco	WAFL	
5	67	Nathan Broad	Richmond	Swan Districts	WAFL	
6	68	Michael Hartley	Essendon	Coburg	VFL	
6	69	Wylie Buzza	Geelong	Mount Gravatt	QAFL	
7	70	Matthew Hayball	Geelong	West Adelaide	SANFL	

Notes

- Compensation picks are selections in addition to the normal order of selection, allocated to clubs by the AFL as compensation for losing uncontracted players to the new expansion clubs, Gold Coast and Greater Western Sydney. The picks can be held for up to five years and clubs declare at the beginning of the season of their intent to utilise the pick at the end of the season. Picks could be traded to other clubs in return for players or other draft selections.
- Free agency compensation picks are additional selections awarded to teams based on their net loss of players during the free agency trade period.
- Academy players are local zone selections available to the four NSW and Queensland clubs. Both academy and father-son selections are subject to a bidding process, where the club with the family or academy connection must match any opposition club's bid with their next available selection.

=== Rookie elevations ===
Clubs were able to promote any player who was listed on their rookie list in 2015 to their 2016 primary playing list prior to the draft. In total, 14 players were promoted.

Player	Club
Jake Kelly	Adelaide
Jack Frost	Collingwood
Shaun McKernan	Essendon
Ethan Hughes	Fremantle
Michael Luxford	Geelong
Adam Saad	Gold Coast
Keegan Brooksby	Gold Coast
Kurt Heatherley	Hawthorn
Aaron vandenBerg	Melbourne
James Harmes	Melbourne
Sam Gray	Port Adelaide
Kane Lambert	Richmond
Jack Sinclair	St Kilda
Sam Naismith	Sydney

== 2016 rookie draft ==
The 2016 AFL rookie draft was held on 27 November 2015. The official rookie draft order was released on 26 November and each club, with the exception of Greater Western Sydney who are still operating with an expanded list, can have between four and six players on their rookie list, as long as they have a maximum of 44 players on their combined primary and rookie lists.

The pre-season draft was not held as all eligible clubs informed the AFL they would not be participating.

Round	Pick	Player	Drafted to	Recruited from	League	Notes
1	1	Jesse Glass-McCasker	Carlton	Swan Districts	WAFL	
1	2	Jackson Paine	Brisbane Lions	Brisbane Lions	AFL	
1	3	Tom Keough	Gold Coast	West Adelaide	SANFL	
1	4	Gach Nyuon	Essendon	Dandenong Stingrays	TAC Cup	
1	5	Nick O'Kearney	St Kilda	Calder Cannons	TAC Cup	
1	6	Josh Wagner	Melbourne	Aspley	NEAFL	
1	7	Lachlan Keeffe	Collingwood	Collingwood	AFL	Ineligible to play in 2016 due to serving a two-year ban for testing positive to banned substance clenbuterol
1	8	Sam Reid	Greater Western Sydney	UWS Giants	NEAFL	
1	9	Jock Cornell	Geelong	Mangoplah-CUE	RFNL	
1	10	Will Snelling	Port Adelaide	West Adelaide	SANFL	
1	11	Brad Lynch	Western Bulldogs	Swan Districts	WAFL	
1	12	Callum Moore	Richmond	Calder Cannons	TAC Cup	
1	13	Paul Hunter	Adelaide	Redland	NEAFL	
1	14	Tom Papley	Sydney	Gippsland Power	TAC Cup	
1	15	Farren Ray	North Melbourne	St Kilda	AFL	
1	16	Matt Uebergang	Fremantle	Redland	NEAFL	
1	17	Jordan Snadden	West Coast	East Fremantle	WAFL	
1	18	Luke Surman	Hawthorn	Norwood	SANFL	
2	19	Andrew Gallucci	Carlton	Williamstown	VFL	
2	20	Reuben William	Brisbane Lions	Zillmere	QAFL	
2	21	Darcy Macpherson	Gold Coast	Northern Knights	TAC Cup	
2	22	Anthony McDonald-Tipungwuti	Essendon	Essendon	VFL	
2	23	Nick Coughlan	St Kilda	Albury	O&MFL	
2	24	Viv Michie	Melbourne	Melbourne	AFL	
2	25	Josh Smith	Collingwood	Redland	NEAFL	
2	26	Daniel Lloyd	Greater Western Sydney	Killarney Vale	BDAFL	
2	27	James Parsons	Geelong	Eastern Ranges	TAC Cup	
2	28	Cameron Hewett	Port Adelaide	North Adelaide	SANFL	
2	29	Luke Goetz	Western Bulldogs	Western Jets	TAC Cup	
2	30	Mabior Chol	Richmond	Aspley	NEAFL	
2	31	Jonathon Beech	Adelaide	West Adelaide	SANFL	
2	32	Harrison Marsh	Sydney	Sydney	AFL	
2	33	Majak Daw	North Melbourne	North Melbourne	AFL	
2	34	Ryan Nyhuis	Fremantle	Nightcliff	NTFL	
2	35	Brant Colledge	West Coast	West Coast	AFL	
2	36	Kade Stewart	Hawthorn	South Fremantle	WAFL	
3	37	Matthew Korcheck	Carlton	Arizona	Pac-12	International player (basketball)
3	38	Ryan Davis	Gold Coast	Swan Districts	WAFL	
3	39	Will Hams	Essendon	Essendon	AFL	
3	40	Josh Saunders	St Kilda	St Kilda	AFL	
3	41	Joel Smith	Melbourne	Geelong Supercats	SEABL	Three-year non-registered player, via basketball (also the son of Shaun Smith)
3	42	Josh Thomas	Collingwood	Collingwood	AFL	Ineligible to play in 2016 due to serving a two-year ban for testing positive to banned substance clenbuterol
3	43	Passed	Greater Western Sydney	—	—	
3	44	Tom Ruggles	Geelong	Geelong	VFL	
3	45	Dan Houston	Port Adelaide	Oakleigh Chargers	TAC Cup	
3	46	Jed Adcock	Western Bulldogs	Brisbane Lions	AFL	
3	47	Adam Marcon	Richmond	Williamstown	VFL	
3	48	Hugh Greenwood	Adelaide	Perth Wildcats	NBL	3-year non-registered player, via basketball.
3	49	Passed	Sydney	—	—	
3	50	Anthony Morabito	Fremantle	Fremantle	AFL	
3	51	Alec Waterman	West Coast	West Coast	AFL	
3	52	Alex Woodward	Hawthorn	Hawthorn	AFL	
4	53	Cameron Loersch	Gold Coast	South Fremantle	WAFL	
4	54	Tom Wallis	Essendon	Calder Cannons	TAC Cup	Father–son rule selection (son of Dean Wallis)
4	55	Tim Golds	Collingwood	Greater Western Sydney	AFL	
4	56	Passed	Greater Western Sydney	—	—	
4	57	Kane Mitchell	Port Adelaide	Port Adelaide	AFL	
4	58	Alex Keath	Adelaide	Victoria	Cricket Australia	Three-year non-registered player, via cricket
4	59	Kyle Galloway	Sydney	Shepparton	GVFL	
4	60	Josh Deluca	Fremantle	Fremantle	AFL	
4	61	Simon Tunbridge	West Coast	West Coast	AFL	
4	62	Conor Glass	Hawthorn	Derry GAA	GAA	International player (Gaelic football)
5	63	Danny Stanley	Gold Coast	Gold Coast	AFL	
5	64	Darrean Wyatt	Collingwood	Coastal Georgia	SSAC	Three-year non-registered player, via basketball
5	65	Passed	Greater Western Sydney	—	—	
5	66	Sam Murray	Sydney	Wodonga	O&MFL	
6	67	Jesse Joyce	Gold Coast	Palm Beach Currumbin	QAFL	
6	68	Passed	Greater Western Sydney	—	—	
6	69	Colin O'Riordan	Sydney	Tipperary GAA	GAA	International player (Gaelic football)
7	70	Passed	Greater Western Sydney	—	—	
8	71	Passed	Greater Western Sydney	—	—	
9	72	Passed	Greater Western Sydney	—	—	

== Player breakdown ==
A total of 134 players were drafted across the national and rookie drafts. The following is a breakdown of players drafted by position and the league they were drafted from:

- Defender – 16
- Half-back – 14
- Midfielder – 49
- Half-forward – 22
- Forward – 19
- Ruckman – 10
- Utility – 3

The TAC Cup was the league with the highest number of players drafted, with forty-five in total. The Dandenong Stingrays in the TAC Cup had the most players drafted out of any team with seven players.

League	National draft	Rookie draft	Total	State/territory
League	Players selected			State/territory
AFL	0	19	19	Australia-wide
NEAFL	3	6	9	ACT, NSW, NT, QLD
SANFL	11	5	16	South Australia
TAC Cup	36	9	45	Victoria
TSL	4	0	4	Tasmania
VFL	4	4	8	Victoria
WAFL	7	6	13	Western Australia
Other leagues	5	8	13	Australia-wide
Three-year non-registered players	0	4	4	Australia-wide
International recruits	0	3	3	International
Total	70	64	134	

== Essendon top-up signings ==
On 12 January 2016, thirty-four past and present Essendon Football Club players – twelve of whom were still on the Essendon list – were suspended until November 2016 after being found guilty of being injected with the banned substance thymosin beta-4 during the 2012 season, significantly compromising Essendon's playing list for 2016. The club received permission to augment its list by recruiting up to ten top-up players from lower levels on contracts which would last until 31 October 2016. The club was limited to players who had been on an AFL list in either 2014 or 2015, with no more than one player to be taken from any state-level club; or, it could recruit any VFL-listed player from its own reserves team without restriction.

Essendon top-up signings
Player	Date	Recruited from	League	Former AFL club	Ref
Ryan Crowley	19 January 2016	Swan Districts	WAFL	Fremantle (2015)	
James Kelly	20 January 2016	Southern Districts	NTFL	Geelong (2015)	
Jonathan Simpkin	27 January 2016	Balwyn	Eastern FL	Hawthorn (2015)	
Matt Dea	28 January 2016	Williamstown	VFL	Richmond (2015)	
James Polkinghorne	29 January 2016	Essendon reserves	VFL	Brisbane Lions (2014)	
Mathew Stokes	29 January 2016	Palmerston	NTFL	Geelong (2015)	
Mark Jamar	2 February 2016	St Kevin's Old Boys	VAFA	Melbourne (2015)	
Sam Grimley	6 February 2016	Subiaco	WAFL	Hawthorn (2015)	
Nathan Grima	18 February 2016	Strathmore	EDFL	North Melbourne (2015)	
Sam Michael	25 February 2016	Redland	NEAFL	Brisbane Lions (2014)	
