= Josh Thomas (Australian footballer) =

Australian rules footballer (born 1991)

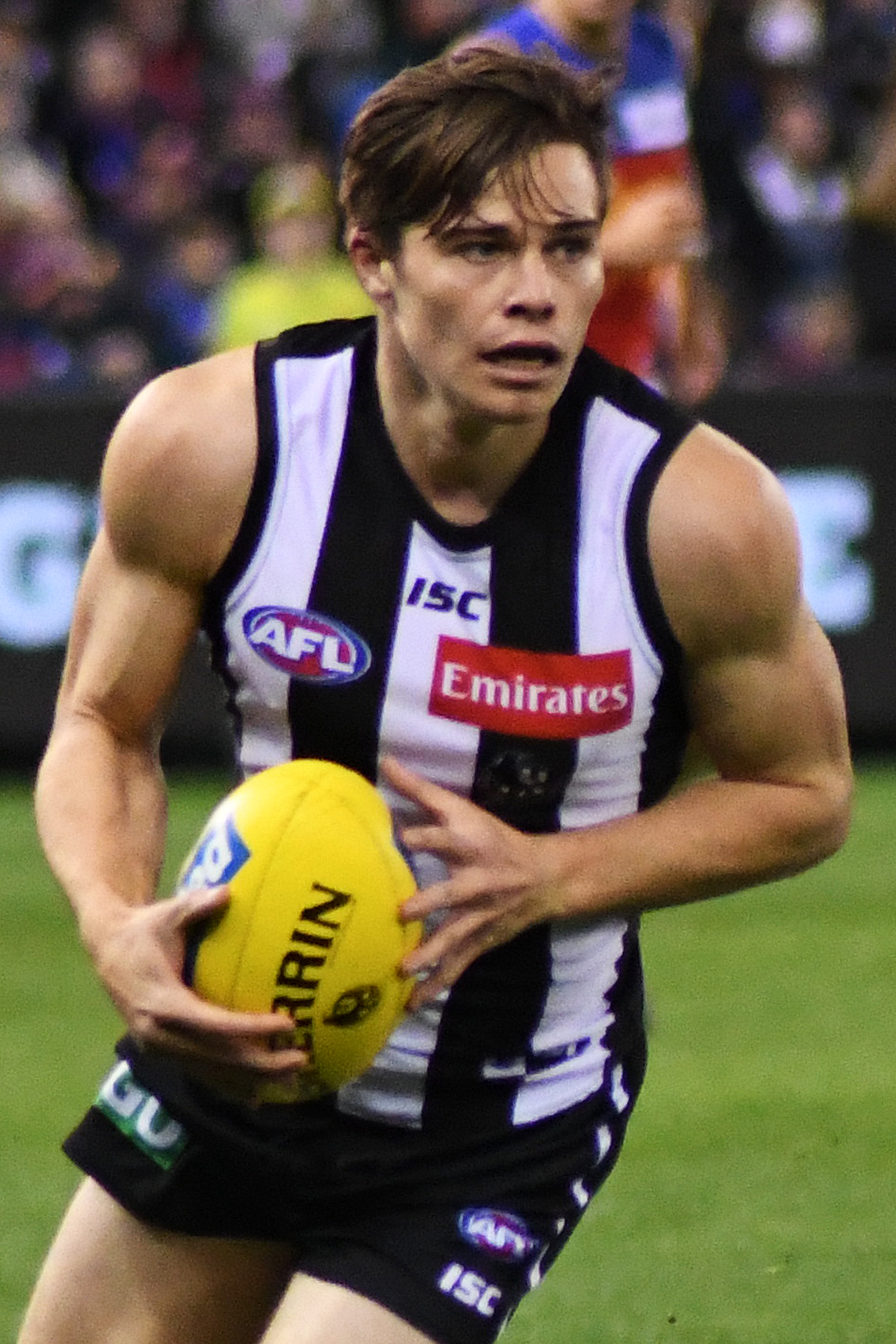
- Thomas playing for Collingwood in August 2018

Personal information
- Full name: Josh Thomas
- Born: 1 October 1991 (age 35); Queensland
- Original team: Redland (QAFL)
- Draft: No. 75, 2009 National Draft, Collingwood
- Height: 176 cm (5 ft 9 in)
- Weight: 77 kg (170 lb)
- Position: Midfielder

Playing career^{1}
Years	Club	Games (Goals)
2010–2015;	Collingwood	123 (101)
- 2016–2021
- ^{1} Playing statistics correct to the end of the 2021 season.

Career highlights
- Harry Collier Trophy: 2013

Josh Thomas (born 1 October 1991) is a retired Australian rules footballer who played for the Collingwood Football Club in the Australian Football League (AFL).

Thomas, a Queensland Under 18 representative in the 2009 AFL National Under 18 Championships, was drafted by Collingwood with the 75th selection in the 2009 AFL draft.

In 2009, Thomas played 11 games for Gold Coast in the TAC Cup. Thomas was offered a contract by Gold Coast, but chose to enter the 2009 AFL draft, stating that he wanted to join an AFL environment as soon as possible, rather than wait for Gold Coast to join the AFL in 2011.

Thomas, along with teammate Lachlan Keeffe, tested positive to the banned substance clenbuterol in drug tests taken in February 2015. Both players accepted provisional suspensions in March 2015. On 10 August 2015 Thomas accepted his two-year ban from the tribunal and that day was delisted by Collingwood but was told he'd be re-drafted as a rookie for the 2017 season if still available in the draft. He was banned from AFL competition until 9 February 2017. Thomas worked as an Uber driver in Queensland whilst he was serving his ban.

On 27 November 2015, Thomas and his teammate Lachlan Keeffe were re-drafted to Collingwood through the rookie draft.

Thomas played in the 2018 AFL Grand Final with Collingwood, losing to the West Coast Eagles by 5 points.

On 14 October 2021, Thomas retired from football.

== Statistics ==
Statistics are correct to the end of the 2021 season

Legend
G	Goals	K	Kicks	D	Disposals	T	Tackles
B	Behinds	H	Handballs	M	Marks

Season	Team	No.	Games	Totals							Averages (per game)						
Season	Team	No.	Games	G	B	K	H	D	M	T	G	B	K	H	D	M	T
2010	Collingwood	24	0	—	—	—	—	—	—	—	—	—	—	—	—	—	—
2011	Collingwood	24	0	—	—	—	—	—	—	—	—	—	—	—	—	—	—
2012	Collingwood	24	0	—	—	—	—	—	—	—	—	—	—	—	—	—	—
2013	Collingwood	24	19	11	8	198	166	363	65	62	0.6	0.4	10.4	8.7	19.1	3.4	3.3
2014	Collingwood	24	13	8	3	124	100	224	33	51	0.6	0.2	9.5	7.7	17.2	2.5	3.9
2017	Collingwood	24	9	6	5	69	79	148	29	25	0.7	0.6	7.7	8.8	16.4	3.2	2.8
2018	Collingwood	24	26	38	13	223	208	431	86	80	1.5	0.5	8.6	8.0	16.6	3.3	3.1
2019	Collingwood	24	22	22	11	157	159	316	65	52	1.0	0.5	7.1	7.2	14.4	3.0	2.4
2020 (Note: The 2020 season was played with 17 home-and-away matches per team (down from 22) and 16-minute quarters with time on (down from 20-minute quarters with time on) due to the impact of the COVID-19 pandemic.)	Collingwood	24	14	4	4	70	78	148	26	28	0.3	0.3	5.0	5.6	10.6	1.9	2.0
2021	Collingwood	24	20	12	9	148	118	266	66	51	0.6	0.5	7.4	5.9	13.3	3.3	2.6
Career			123	101	53	989	907	1896	370	349	0.8	0.4	8.0	7.4	15.4	3.0	2.8
