= Josh Saunders (Australian footballer) =

Australian rules footballer

Personal information
- Full name: Joshua Saunders
- Born: 31 August 1994 (age 32); Geelong, Victoria
- Original team: Geelong Falcons
- Draft: No. 43, 2012 National draft, St Kilda
- Height: 180 cm (5 ft 11 in)
- Weight: 78 kg (172 lb)
- Position: Midfielder

Playing career^{1}
Years	Club	Games (Goals)
2013–2016	St Kilda	22 (7)
- ^{1} Playing statistics correct to the end of 2016.

Joshua (Josh) Saunders (born 31 August 1994) is a former professional Australian rules footballer who played for the St Kilda Football Club in the Australian Football League (AFL). He was initially picked with the 43rd selection in the 2012 national draft.

== AFL career ==
Saunders attended The Geelong College, and in year 9 was one of the youngest-ever Geelong College students to play in the 1st XVIII Football team, at only 14 years old. He later played for Geelong Falcons, where in 2012 he received the coach's award. He is noted for his run-and-carry style of play, explosive pace, and endurance.

In Round 5 of the 2013 AFL season, Saunders made his AFL debut for St Kilda against Sydney Swans at Westpac Stadium in Wellington, New Zealand, in the first-ever premiership season game held outside Australia.

He was delisted in October 2015; however, he was re-drafted in the 2016 rookie draft. He was delisted again at the end of the 2016 season.
