= Tim Golds =

Australian rules footballer (born 1993)

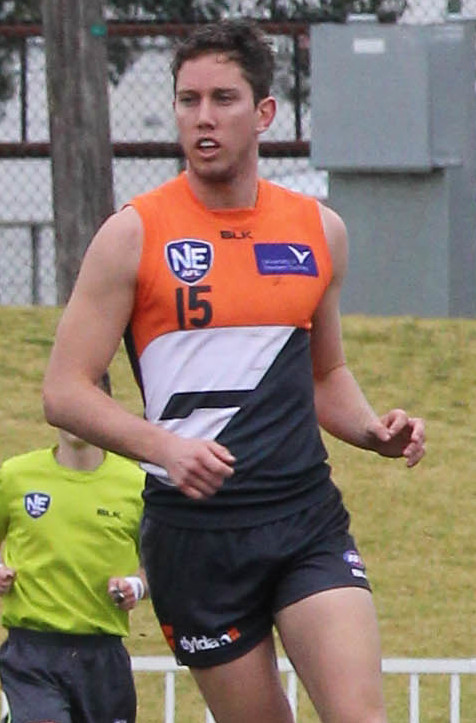
- Golds in August 2015

Personal information
- Full name: Tim Golds
- Born: 6 April 1993 (age 33)
- Original teams: Balwyn (EFL); Oakleigh Chargers (TAC Cup)/Xavier College
- Draft: Underage recruit, Greater Western Sydney
- Height: 193 cm (6 ft 4 in)
- Weight: 86 kg (190 lb)
- Position: Defender

Playing career^{1}
Years	Club	Games (Goals)
2012–2015	Greater Western Sydney	6 (0)
2016	Collingwood	0 (0)
Total		6 (0)
- ^{1} Playing statistics correct to the end of 2016.

Tim Golds (born 6 April 1993) is a former professional Australian rules footballer who played for the Greater Western Sydney Giants in the Australian Football League (AFL). He was also listed with the Collingwood Football Club in 2016, but did not play a senior match. He was recruited by the Greater Western Sydney Giants as an underage selection at the age of 17. Golds made his debut for the Giants in round 20, 2012, against Gold Coast at Carrara Stadium. He was delisted by the Giants in October 2015.

Golds first came to public prominence in the drawn Grand Final in 2010. Wearing a "Team GWS" jumper, Golds finished in second place in the Grand Final sprint race at half time behind St Kilda's Luke Miles.

In November 2015, Golds was recruited by Collingwood through the rookie draft. Golds played every game of the 2016 VFL season, but he wasn't able to secure a single senior game and he was delisted at the end of the season.

== Statistics ==
Legend
G	Goals	K	Kicks	D	Disposals	T	Tackles
B	Behinds	H	Handballs	M	Marks

Season	Team	No.	Games	Totals							Averages (per game)						
Season	Team	No.	Games	G	B	K	H	D	M	T	G	B	K	H	D	M	T
2012	Greater Western Sydney	15	2	0	0	10	8	18	4	1	0.0	0.0	5.0	4.0	9.0	2.0	0.5
2013	Greater Western Sydney	15	1	0	0	5	4	9	3	2	0.0	0.0	5.0	4.0	9.0	3.0	2.0
2014	Greater Western Sydney	15	3	0	0	15	12	27	7	2	0.0	0.0	5.0	4.0	9.0	2.3	0.7
2015	Greater Western Sydney	15	0	—	—	—	—	—	—	—	—	—	—	—	—	—	—
2016	Collingwood	41	0	—	—	—	—	—	—	—	—	—	—	—	—	—	—
Career			6	0	0	30	24	54	14	5	0.0	0.0	5.0	4.0	9.0	2.3	0.8
