= 2015 Collingwood Football Club season =

Collingwood Football Club
2015 season
- President: Eddie McGuire
- Coach: Nathan Buckley (4th season)
- Captains: Scott Pendlebury (2nd season)
- Home ground: The MCG
- Regular season: 12th
- Finals series: DNQ
- Best and Fairest: Scott Pendlebury
- Leading goalkicker: Jamie Elliott (35 goals)
- Highest home attendance: 75,880 vs. Hawthorn (Round 14)
- Lowest home attendance: 33,771 vs. Adelaide (Round 2)
- Average home attendance: 47,259
- Club membership: 76,497

The 2015 Collingwood Football Club season was the club's 119th season of senior competition in the Australian Football League (AFL). The club also fielded its reserves team in the VFL.

== Squad ==
Players are listed by guernsey number, and 2015 statistics are for AFL regular season and finals series matches during the 2015 AFL season only. Career statistics include a player's complete AFL career, which, as a result, means that a player's debut and part or whole of their career statistics may be for another club. Statistics are correct as of Round 23 of the 2015 season (6 September 2015) and are taken from AFL Tables

No.	Name	AFL debut	Games (2015)	Goals (2015)	Games (CFC)	Goals (CFC)	Games (AFL career)	Goals (AFL career)
1	Alex Fasolo	2011	17	27	69	79	69	79
2	Sam Dwyer	2013	5	4	39	22	39	22
3	Brent Macaffer	2009	0	0	73	32	73	32
4	Brodie Grundy	2013	19	8	41	12	41	12
5	Jamie Elliott	2012	20	35	72	104	72	104
6	Tyson Goldsack	2007	13	1	137	48	137	48
7	Ben Kennedy	2013	5	2	25	15	25	15
8	Tom Langdon	2014	22	0	41	0	41	0
9	Jesse White	2008 (Sydney)	18	27	36	47	107	120
10	Scott Pendlebury (c)	2006	22	15	214	141	214	141
11	Jarryd Blair	2010	20	19	122	95	122	95
12	Matthew Scharenberg	2015	4	0	4	0	4	0
13	Taylor Adams	2012 (Greater Western Sydney)	18	7	30	9	61	21
14	Clinton Young	2005 (Hawthorn)	0	0	21	9	137	69
15	Jarrod Witts	2013	11	5	38	18	38	18
16	Nathan Brown	2008	21	0	114	7	114	7
17	Jonathon Marsh	2015	5	0	5	0	5	0
18	Travis Varcoe	2007 (Geelong)	22	10	22	10	160	140
19	Levi Greenwood	2009 (North Melbourne)	8	4	8	4	82	30
20	Ben Reid	2007	5	6	104	37	104	37
21	Nathan Freeman	****	0	0	0	0	0	0
22	Steele Sidebottom	2009	16	7	143	106	143	106
23	Lachlan Keeffe	2011	0	0	40	7	40	7
24	Josh Thomas	2013	0	0	32	19	32	19
25	Jack Crisp	2012 (Brisbane Lions)	22	16	22	16	40	26
26	Marley Williams	2012	20	2	57	6	57	6
27	Tony Armstrong	2010 (Adelaide)	1	0	6	0	35	2
28	Ben Sinclair	2011	6	0	50	20	50	20
29	Tim Broomhead	2014	11	7	19	16	19	16
30	Darcy Moore	2015	9	9	9	9	9	9
31	Jackson Ramsay	2014	5	0	7	0	7	0
32	Travis Cloke	2005	17	34	233	424	233	424
33	Patrick Karnezis	2011 (Brisbane Lions)	4	2	4	2	25	26
34	Alan Toovey	2007	20	0	151	9	151	9
35	Jordan De Goey	2015	16	6	16	6	16	6
36	Dane Swan	2003	21	21	257	211	257	211
37	Brayden Maynard	2015	9	2	9	2	9	2
38	Matthew Goodyear	****	0	0	0	0	0	0
39	Michael Manteit	****	0	0	0	0	0	0
40	Paul Seedsman	2012	12	4	49	17	49	17
41	Brenden Abbott	****	0	0	0	0	0	0
43	Adam Oxley	2013	17	5	19	5	19	5
44	Corey Gault	2014	3	2	4	4	4	4
45	Jack Frost	2013	20	0	44	0	44	0
46	Mason Cox	****	0	0	0	0	0	0

=== Squad changes ===
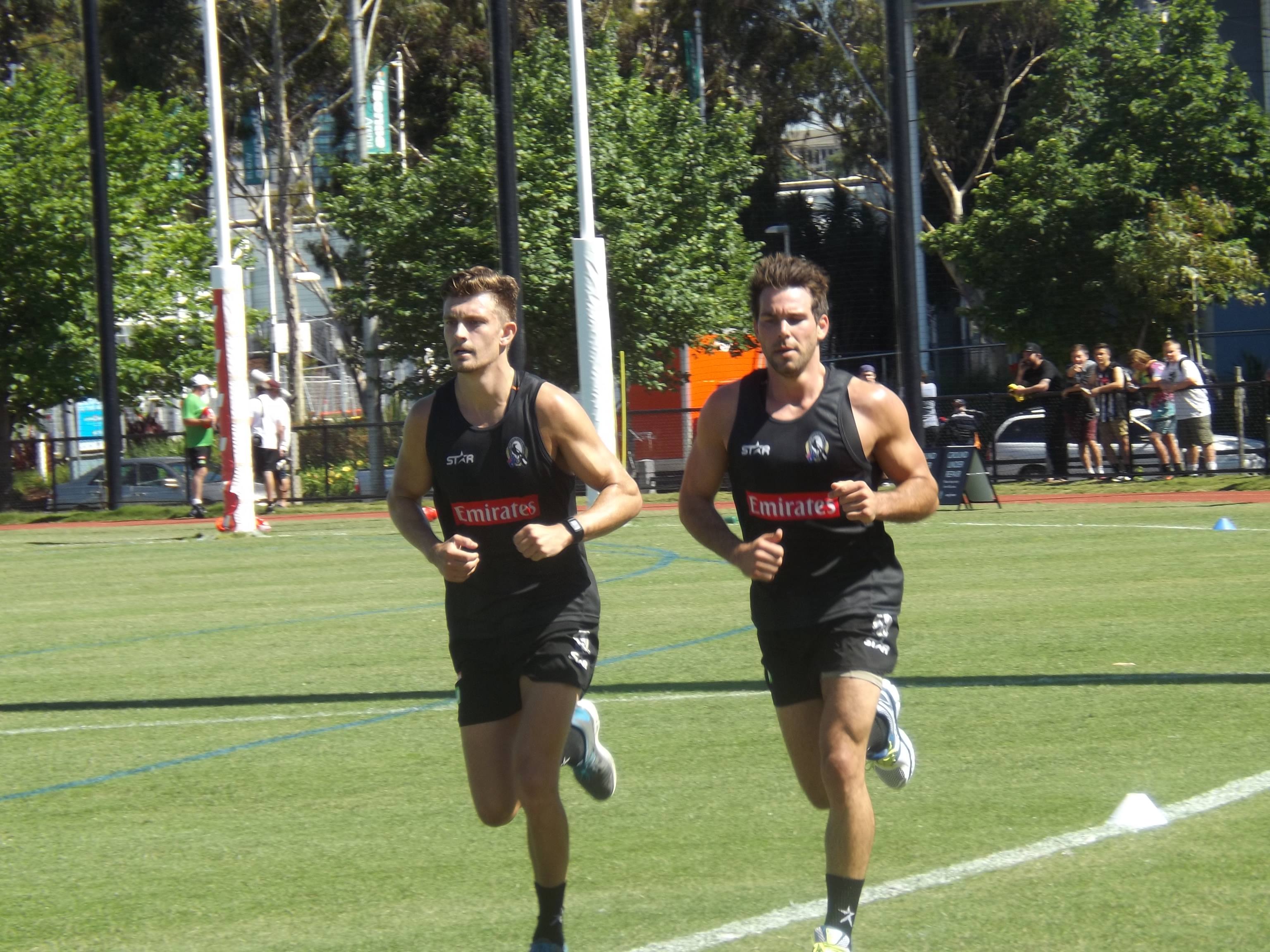
Adam Oxley (left) and new recruit Levi Greenwood running during pre-season training in December 2014

==== In ====
No.	Name	Position	Previous club	via
46	(United States) Mason Cox	Ruckman / Forward	Oklahoma State University	AFL Rookie Draft, fourth round (pick #60)
30	(Victoria (state)) Darcy Moore	Defender / Forward	Oakleigh Chargers	AFL National Draft, first round (pick #9), Father–son rule selection - son of Peter Moore
18	(South Australia) Travis Varcoe	Forward	Geelong	trade
25	(Victoria (state)) Jack Crisp	Midfielder	Brisbane Lions	trade
19	(South Australia) Levi Greenwood	Midfielder	North Melbourne	trade
35	(Victoria (state)) Jordan De Goey	Defender / Midfielder	Oakleigh Chargers	AFL National Draft, first round (pick #5)
37	(Victoria (state)) Brayden Maynard	Defender	Sandringham Dragons	AFL National Draft, second round (pick #30)
38	(Victoria (state)) Matthew Goodyear	Midfielder	Calder Cannons	AFL National Draft, third round (pick #48)
39	(Victoria (state)) Michael Manteit	Defender / Midfielder	Sandringham Dragons	AFL Rookie Draft, first round (pick #8)
41	(Western Australia) Brenden Abbott	Forward	Claremont	AFL Rookie Draft, second round (pick #26)
27	(New South Wales) Tony Armstrong	Defender	Collingwood	AFL Rookie Draft, third round (pick #43)

==== Out ====
No.	Name	Position	New Club	via
38	(Queensland) Peter Yagmoor	Defender / Midfielder		delisted
9	(Northern Ireland) Martin Clarke	Defender		delisted
48	(Northern Ireland) Caolan Mooney	Forward		delisted
37	(Victoria (state)) Kyle Martin	Midfielder		retired
8	(Brazil) Heritier Lumumba	Defender	Melbourne	trade
17	(Queensland) Dayne Beams	Midfielder	Brisbane Lions	trade
27	(New South Wales) Tony Armstrong	Defender		delisted
23	(Queensland) Lachlan Keeffe	Defender		delisted
24	(Queensland) Josh Thomas	Midfielder		delisted

== Season summary ==
=== Pre-season matches ===
Collingwood's 2015 NAB Challenge fixtures
Date and local time	Opponent	Scores^{[a]}			Venue	Attendance	Ref
Date and local time	Opponent	Home	Away	Result	Venue	Attendance	Ref
Thursday, 26 February (7:10 pm)	Hawthorn	2.8.6 (72)	0.17.14 (116)	Won by 44 points	Aurora Stadium [A]	15,422	
Sunday, 15 March (4:40 pm)	Carlton	1.7.13 (64)	1.9.8 (71)	Lost by 7 points	Queen Elizabeth Oval [H]	9,542	
Saturday, 21 March (7:10 pm)	Western Bulldogs	0.18.7 (115)	0.8.6 (54)	Lost by 61 points	Etihad Stadium [A]	10,457	

=== Regular season ===
Collingwood's 2015 AFL season fixtures
Round	Date and local time	Opponent	Home	Away	Result	Venue	Attendance	Ladder position	Ref
Round	Date and local time	Opponent	Scores^{[a]}			Venue	Attendance	Ladder position	Ref
1	Saturday, 4 April (6:20 pm)	Brisbane Lions	11.8 (74)	12.14 (86)	Won by 12 points	Gabba [A]	31,240	6th	
2	Saturday, 11 April (4:35 pm)	Adelaide	9.9 (63)	12.18 (90)	Lost by 27 points	Etihad Stadium [H]	33,771	12th	
3	Friday, 17 April (7:50 pm)	St Kilda	21.14 (140)	10.6 (66)	Won by 74 points	MCG [H]	45,197	6th	
4	Saturday, 25 April (2:40 pm)	Essendon	6.13 (49)	9.15 (69)	Won by 20 points	MCG [A]	88,395	3rd	
5	Friday, 1 May (7:50 pm)	Carlton	6.9 (45)	18.12 (120)	Won by 75 points	MCG [A]	71,759	2nd	
6	Friday, 8 May (7:50 pm)	Geelong	8.11 (59)	15.10 (100)	Lost by 41 points	MCG [H]	52,152	3rd	
7	Sunday, 17 May (3:20 pm)	Richmond	16.9 (105)	15.10 (100)	Lost by 5 points	MCG [A]	59,034	7th	
8	Saturday, 23 May (4:35 pm)	Gold Coast	9.9 (63)	20.12 (132)	Won by 69 points	Metricon Stadium [A]	16,440	5th	
9	Sunday, 31 May (3:20 pm)	North Melbourne	17.10 (112)	14.11 (95)	Won by 17 points	MCG [H]	43,452	4th	
10	Monday, 8 June (3:20 pm)	Melbourne	13.7 (85)	17.8 (110)	Won by 25 points	MCG [A]	66,120	4th	
11	Sunday, 14 June (1:10 pm)	Greater Western Sydney	18.11 (119)	11.11 (77)	Won by 42 points	MCG [H]	43,390	4th	
12	Bye							4th	
13	Thursday, 25 June (6:10 pm)	Fremantle	12.8 (80)	12.7 (73)	Lost by 7 points	Domain Stadium [A]	37,145	5th	
14	Friday, 3 July (7:50 pm)	Hawthorn	12.19 (91)	15.11 (101)	Lost by 10 points	MCG [H]	75,880	5th	
15	Thursday, 9 July (7:20 pm)	Port Adelaide	9.12 (66)	9.9 (63)	Lost by 3 points	Adelaide Oval [A]	45,418	7th	
16	Saturday, 18 July (4:35 pm)	West Coast	7.14 (56)	11.21 (87)	Lost by 31 points	Etihad Stadium [H]	36,527	9th	
17	Sunday, 26 July (1:10 pm)	Western Bulldogs	15.14 (104)	13.8 (86)	Lost by 18 points	Etihad Stadium [A]	40,581	11th	
18	Saturday, 1 August (2:10 pm)	Melbourne	7.12 (54)	14.7 (91)	Lost by 37 points	MCG [H]	37,894	11th	
19	Saturday, 8 August (1:45 pm)	Carlton	16.9 (105)	13.9 (87)	Won by 18 points	MCG [H]	48,133	11th	
20	Friday, 14 August (7:50 pm)	Sydney	13.9 (87)	10.16 (76)	Lost by 11 points	SCG [A]	38,408	11th	
21	Saturday, 22 August (1:45 pm)	Richmond	7.14 (56)	23.9 (147)	Lost by 91 points	MCG [H]	63,178	12th	
22	Friday, 28 August (7:50 pm)	Geelong	9.8 (62)	17.8 (110)	Won by 48 points	MCG [A]	40,582	12th	
23	Sunday, 6 September (3:20 pm)	Essendon	14.8 (92)	14.11 (95)	Lost by 3 points	MCG [H]	40,270	12th	

== Ladder ==
Pos	Team	Pld	W	L	D	PF	PA	PP	Pts	Qualification
1	Fremantle	22	17	5	0	1857	1564	118.7	68	Finals series
2	West Coast	22	16	5	1	2330	1572	148.2	66	Finals series
3	Hawthorn (P)	22	16	6	0	2452	1548	158.4	64	Finals series
4	Sydney	22	16	6	0	2006	1578	127.1	64	Finals series
5	Richmond	22	15	7	0	1930	1568	123.1	60	Finals series
6	Western Bulldogs	22	14	8	0	2101	1825	115.1	56	Finals series
7	Adelaide	21	13	8	0	2107	1821	115.7	54 (Note: The round 14 match between Adelaide and Geelong was cancelled due to the death of Adelaide coach Phil Walsh, and both teams were awarded two premiership points each.)	Finals series
8	North Melbourne	22	13	9	0	2062	1937	106.5	52	Finals series
9	Port Adelaide	22	12	10	0	2002	1874	106.8	48	
10	Geelong	21	11	9	1	1853	1833	101.1	48	
11	Greater Western Sydney	22	11	11	0	1872	1891	99.0	44	
12	Collingwood	22	10	12	0	1972	1856	106.3	40	
13	Melbourne	22	7	15	0	1573	2044	77.0	28	
14	St Kilda	22	6	15	1	1695	2162	78.4	26	
15	Essendon	22	6	16	0	1580	2134	74.0	24	
16	Gold Coast	22	4	17	1	1633	2240	72.9	18	
17	Brisbane Lions	22	4	18	0	1557	2306	67.5	16	
18	Carlton	22	4	18	0	1525	2354	64.8	16	

Rules for classification: 1) points; 2) percentage; 3) number of points for.
(P) Premiers

== Awards & Milestones ==
=== AFL Awards ===
- Anzac Medal – Paul Seedsman (Round 4)
- Player of the Round - Jamie Elliott (Round 9)
- Neale Daniher Trophy – Travis Cloke (Round 10)
- 2015 22under22 selection – Tom Langdon
- 2015 22under22 selection – Brodie Grundy
- Captain of the AFL Coaches Association's 2015 All-Australian team (Interchange) – Scott Pendlebury

=== AFL Award Nominations ===
- Round 11 – 2015 AFL Rising Star nomination – Tim Broomhead
- Round 20 – 2015 AFL Rising Star nomination – Jordan De Goey
- 2015 All-Australian team 40-man squad – Scott Pendlebury, Dane Swan

=== Club Awards ===
- E.W. Copeland Trophy – Scott Pendlebury
- R.T. Rush Trophy – Dane Swan
- J.J. Joyce Trophy – Jack Crisp
- J.F. McHale Trophy – Taylor Adams
- Jack Regan Trophy – Steele Sidebottom
- Joseph Wren Memorial Trophy – Ben Moloney
- Darren Millane Memorial Trophy – Nathan Brown
- Harry Collier Trophy – Jordan De Goey
- Gordon Coventry Trophy – Jamie Elliott
- Gavin Brown Award – Jack Crisp
- Magpie Army Player of the Year – Dane Swan

=== Milestones ===
- Round 1 – Jordan De Goey (AFL debut)
- Round 1 – Travis Varcoe (Collingwood debut)
- Round 1 – Jack Crisp (Collingwood debut)
- Round 1 – Steele Sidebottom (100 goals)
- Round 3 – Patrick Karnezis (Collingwood debut)
- Round 3 – Dane Swan (151 games at the MCG, most games at the home of football in the club's history.)
- Round 4 – Travis Cloke (400 goals)
- Round 6 – Jesse White (100 AFL goals)
- Round 7 – Nathan Brown (100 games)
- Round 8 – Scott Pendlebury (200 games)
- Round 8 – Taylor Adams (50 AFL games)
- Round 9 – Dane Swan (200 goals)
- Round 10 – Scott Pendlebury (50 games as skipper)
- Round 11 – Jesse White (100 AFL games)
- Round 11 – Nathan Buckley (50 wins)
- Round 14 – Darcy Moore (AFL debut)
- Round 14 – Brayden Maynard (AFL debut)
- Round 15 – Dane Swan (250 games)
- Round 16 – Levi Greenwood (Collingwood debut)
- Round 18 – Matthew Scharenberg (AFL debut)
- Round 19 – Ben Reid (100 games)
- Round 19 – Jonathon Marsh (AFL debut)
- Round 20 – Jamie Elliott (100 goals)
- Round 22 – Ben Sinclair (50 games)

== VFL season ==
=== Pre-season matches ===
Collingwood's 2015 VFL pre-season fixture
Date and local time	Opponent	Home	Away	Result	Venue	Ref
Date and local time	Opponent	Scores^{[a]}			Venue	Ref
Saturday, 14 March (12:00 pm)	Geelong	16.7 (103)	9.9 (63)	Lost by 40 points	Kardinia Park [A]	
Thursday, 26 March (6:00 pm)	Richmond	2.3 (15)	21.7 (133)	Won by 118 points	Punt Road Oval [A]	
Saturday, 4 April (10:30 am)	Casey	10.7 (67)	14.11 (95)	Lost by 28 points	Olympic Park Oval [H]	
Saturday, 11 April (12:30 pm)	North Ballarat	12.12 (84)	8.10 (58)	Won by 26 points	Victoria Park [H]	

=== Regular season ===
Collingwood's 2015 VFL season fixture
Round	Date and local time	Opponent	Home	Away	Result	Venue	Ladder position	Ref
Round	Date and local time	Opponent	Scores^{[a]}			Venue	Ladder position	Ref
1	Sunday, 19 April (1:30 pm)	North Ballarat	11.14 (80)	6.9 (45)	Lost by 35 points	Eureka Stadium [A]	13th	
2	Sunday, 26 April (11:30 am)	Essendon	11.9 (75)	5.13 (43)	Lost by 32 points	Windy Hill [A]	14th	
3	Saturday, 2 May (1:00 pm)	Footscray	16.4 (100)	14.12 (96)	Won by 4 points	Victoria Park [H]	14th	
4	Saturday, 9 May (6:00 pm)	Geelong	12.11 (83)	14.8 (92)	Won by 9 points	Queen Elizabeth Oval [A]	12th	
5	Sunday, 17 May (12:00 pm)	Richmond	14.8 (92)	14.11 (95)	Won by 3 points	ME Bank Centre [A]	6th	
6	Bye						9th	
7	Saturday, 30 May (2:00 pm)	Coburg	11.17 (83)	18.13 (121)	Won by 38 points	Piranha Park [A]	8th	
8	Saturday, 6 June (2:00 pm)	Casey	10.12 (72)	9.14 (68)	Lost by 4 points	Casey Fields [A]	9th	
9	Sunday, 14 June (11:00 am)	Werribee	18.13 (121)	12.7 (79)	Won by 42 points	Victoria Park [H]	8th	
10	Bye						9th	
11	Saturday, 27 June (1:00 pm)	Box Hill	9.8 (62)	9.6 (60)	Won by 2 points	Victoria Park [H]	7th	
12	Saturday, 4 July (1:00 pm)	Sandringham	11.12 (78)	10.8 (68)	Won by 10 points	Victoria Park [H]	6th	
13	Sunday, 11 July (1:00 pm)	Footscray	21.12 (138)	10.10 (70)	Lost by 68 points	Whitten Oval [A]	8th	
14	Sunday, 19 July (2:00 pm)	Frankston	13.4 (82)	19.9 (123)	Won by 41 points	Frankston Park [A]	7th	
15	Sunday, 26 July (12:00 pm)	Casey	12.11 (83)	9.6 (60)	Won by 23 points	Victoria Park [H]	5th	
16	Sunday, 2 August (2:00 pm)	Williamstown	14.13 (97)	9.11 (65)	Lost by 32 points	Burbank Oval [A]	7th	
17	Saturday, 8 August (10:30 am)	Northern Blues	21.10 (136)	10.8 (68)	Won by 68 points	MCG [H]	6th	
18	Saturday, 15 August (1:00 pm)	North Ballarat	17.7 (109)	17.15 (117)	Lost by 8 points	Victoria Park [H]	7th	
19	Saturday, 22 August (10:30 am)	Richmond	22.18 (150)	12.6 (78)	Won by 72 points	Victoria Park [H]	7th	
20	Saturday, 29 August (1:00 pm)	Port Melbourne	10.12 (72)	9.10 (64)	Won by 8 points	Victoria Park [H]	6th	

=== Finals series ===
Collingwood's 2015 VFL finals series fixture
Round	Date and local time	Opponent	Home	Away	Result	Venue	Ref
Round	Date and local time	Opponent	Scores^{[a]}			Venue	Ref
2nd Elimination Final	Saturday, 5 September (12:10 pm)	Werribee	13.15 (93)	9.10 (64)	Won by 29 points	North Port Oval [H]	
2nd Semi-final	Sunday, 13 September (11:40 am)	Sandringham	15.14 (104)	14.13 (97)	Lost by 7 points	North Port Oval [A]	
Collingwood was eliminated from the 2015 VFL finals series

=== Ladder ===
2015 VFL ladder
Pos	Team	Pld	W	L	D	PF	PA	PP	Pts	
1	Box Hill Hawks	18	14	4	0	1797	1184	151.8	56	Finals series
2	Sandringham	18	14	4	0	1678	1357	123.7	56	Finals series
3	Williamstown (P)	18	13	5	0	1764	1283	137.5	52	Finals series
4	Footscray	18	12	6	0	1708	1282	133.2	48	Finals series
5	Essendon	18	12	6	0	1680	1355	124.0	48	Finals series
6	Collingwood	18	12	6	0	1633	1491	109.5	48	Finals series
7	Werribee	18	11	7	0	1555	1345	115.6	44	Finals series
8	Casey Scorpions	18	9	9	0	1382	1352	102.2	36	Finals series
9	North Ballarat	18	8	10	0	1389	1499	92.7	32	
10	Port Melbourne	18	7	11	0	1626	1597	101.8	28	
11	Geelong	18	7	11	0	1405	1568	89.6	28	
12	Coburg	18	7	11	0	1299	1565	83.0	28	
13	Richmond	18	5	13	0	1336	1605	83.2	20	
14	Northern Blues	18	4	14	0	1319	1787	73.8	16	
15	Frankston	18	0	18	0	1008	2309	43.7	0	

Source: Ladder for 2015 Peter Jackson VFL
Rules for classification: 1) points; 2) percentage; 3) number of points for.
(P) Premiers

== Notes ==
Key

- H Home match.
- A Away match.

Notes

- **^{a}** Collingwood's scores are indicated in **bold** font.
