= 2014 Collingwood Football Club season =

Collingwood Football Club
2014 season
- President: Eddie McGuire
- Coach: Nathan Buckley (3rd season)
- Captains: Scott Pendlebury (1st season)
- Home ground: MCG
- Regular season: 11th
- Finals series: DNQ
- Best and Fairest: Scott Pendlebury
- Leading goalkicker: Travis Cloke (39 goals)
- Highest home attendance: 91,731 vs. Essendon (Round 6)
- Lowest home attendance: 28,339 vs. Western Bulldogs (Round 13)
- Average home attendance: 48,009
- Club membership: 80,793

The 2014 Collingwood Football Club season was the club's 118th season of senior competition in the Australian Football League (AFL). The club also fielded its reserves team in the VFL.

== Squad ==
Players are listed by guernsey number, and 2014 statistics are for AFL regular season and finals series matches during the 2014 AFL season only. Career statistics include a player's complete AFL career, which, as a result, means that a player's debut and part or whole of their career statistics may be for another club. Statistics are correct as of Round 23 of the 2014 season (29 August 2014) and are taken from AFL Tables

No.	Name	AFL debut	Games (2014)	Goals (2014)	Games (CFC)	Goals (CFC)	Games (AFL career)	Goals (AFL career)
1	Alex Fasolo	2011	12	7	52	52	52	52
2	Sam Dwyer	2013	13	3	34	18	34	18
3	Brent Macaffer	2009	21	4	73	32	73	32
4	Brodie Grundy	2013	15	3	22	4	22	4
5	Nick Maxwell	2004	10	0	208	29	208	29
6	Tyson Goldsack	2007	20	10	124	47	124	47
7	Ben Kennedy	2013	8	4	20	13	20	13
8	Héritier Lumumba	2005	21	3	199	28	199	28
9	Martin Clarke	2007	1	0	73	19	73	19
10	Scott Pendlebury (c)	2006	21	13	192	126	192	126
11	Jarryd Blair	2010	21	12	102	76	102	76
12	Luke Ball	2003 (St Kilda)	17	6	81	33	223	91
13	Taylor Adams	2012 (Greater Western Sydney)	12	2	12	2	43	14
14	Clinton Young	2005 (Hawthorn)	19	9	21	9	137	69
15	Jarrod Witts	2013	20	8	27	13	27	13
16	Nathan Brown	2008	3	0	93	7	93	7
17	Dayne Beams	2009	19	23	110	118	110	118
18	Jesse White	2008 (Sydney)	18	20	18	20	89	93
19	Jamie Elliott	2012	17	33	52	69	52	69
20	Ben Reid	2007	4	1	99	31	99	31
21	Quinten Lynch	2002 (West Coast)	0	0	18	9	227	290
22	Steele Sidebottom	2009	19	14	127	99	127	99
23	Lachlan Keeffe	2011	18	1	40	7	40	7
24	Josh Thomas	2013	13	8	32	19	32	19
25	Ben Hudson	2004 (Adelaide)	0	0	7	1	168	19
26	Marley Williams	2012	15	1	37	4	37	4
27	Tony Armstrong	2010 (Adelaide)	5	0	5	0	34	2
28	Ben Sinclair	2011	5	2	44	20	44	20
29	Tim Broomhead	2014	8	9	8	9	8	9
31	Jackson Ramsay	2014	2	0	2	0	2	0
32	Travis Cloke	2005	20	39	216	390	216	390
33	Patrick Karnezis	2011 (Brisbane Lions)	0	0	0	0	21	24
34	Alan Toovey	2007	17	1	131	9	131	9
35	Matthew Scharenberg	****	0	0	0	0	0	0
36	Dane Swan	2003	17	11	236	190	236	190
37	Kyle Martin	2013	2	1	6	7	6	7
38	Peter Yagmoor	2012	0	0	2	0	2	0
39	Nathan Freeman	****	0	0	0	0	0	0
40	Paul Seedsman	2012	9	2	37	13	37	13
41	Tom Langdon	2014	19	0	19	0	19	0
43	Adam Oxley	2013	0	0	2	0	2	0
44	Corey Gault	2014	1	2	1	2	1	2
45	Jack Frost	2013	22	0	24	0	24	0
46	Jonathon Marsh	****	0	0	0	0	0	0
48	Caolan Mooney	2012	0	0	6	2	6	2

=== Squad changes ===
==== In ====
No.	Name	Position	Previous club	via
18	(Victoria (state)) Jesse White	Forward	Sydney	trade
13	(Victoria (state)) Taylor Adams	Midfielder	Greater Western Sydney	trade
33	(Victoria (state)) Patrick Karnezis	Forward	Brisbane Lions	trade
27	(New South Wales) Tony Armstrong	Defender	Sydney	free agent
35	(South Australia) Matthew Scharenberg	Defender	Glenelg	AFL National Draft, first round (pick #6)
39	(Victoria (state)) Nathan Freeman	Midfielder	Sandringham Dragons	AFL National Draft, first round (pick #10)
41	(Victoria (state)) Tom Langdon	Defender / Midfielder	Sandringham Dragons	AFL National Draft, fourth round (pick #65)
46	(Western Australia) Jonathon Marsh	Forward	East Fremantle	AFL National Draft, fifth round (pick #77)
44	(Western Australia) Corey Gault	Defender	Collingwood	AFL Rookie Draft, first round (pick #10)

==== Out ====
No.	Name	Position	New Club	via
4	(South Australia) Alan Didak	Forward / Midfielder		delisted
18	(Victoria (state)) Darren Jolly	Ruckman		delisted
2	(South Australia) Jordan Russell	Defender		delisted
7	(Western Australia) Andrew Krakouer	Forward		delisted
30	(Tasmania) Ben Richmond	Forward / Defender		delisted
47	(New South Wales) Michael Hartley	Defender		delisted
13	(Victoria (state)) Dale Thomas	Midfielder / Forward	Carlton	restricted free agent
39	(Victoria (state)) Heath Shaw	Defender	Greater Western Sydney	trade
33	(Victoria (state)) Jackson Paine	Forward	Brisbane Lions	trade
44	(Western Australia) Corey Gault	Defender		delisted
5	(Victoria (state)) Nick Maxwell	Defender		retired
25	(Victoria (state)) Ben Hudson	Ruckman		retired
21	(Western Australia) Quinten Lynch	Utility		retired
12	(Victoria (state)) Luke Ball	Midfielder		retired

== Season summary ==
=== Pre-season matches ===
Collingwood's 2014 NAB Challenge fixtures
Date and local time	Opponent	Scores^{[a]}			Venue	Attendance	Ref
Date and local time	Opponent	Home	Away	Result	Venue	Attendance	Ref
Wednesday, 12 February (7:10 pm)	Geelong	0.16.8 (104)	1.13.15 (102)	Lost by 2 points	Simonds Stadium [A]	12,140	
Saturday, 22 February (4:40 pm)	Richmond	1.10.7 (76)	1.17.13 (124)	Lost by 48 points	Wangaratta Showgrounds [H]	11,000	

Collingwood's 2014 practice matches
Date and local time	Opponent	Scores^{[a]}			Venue	Attendance	Ref
Date and local time	Opponent	Home	Away	Result	Venue	Attendance	Ref
Sunday, 2 March (12:00 pm)	Gold Coast	14.13 (97)	16.15 (111)	Won by 14 points	Metricon Stadium [A]	4,830	

=== Regular season ===
Collingwood's 2014 AFL season fixtures
Round	Date and local time	Opponent	Home	Away	Result	Venue	Attendance	Ladder position	Ref
Round	Date and local time	Opponent	Scores^{[a]}			Venue	Attendance	Ladder position	Ref
1	Friday, 14 March (7:50 pm)	Fremantle	5.16 (54)	17.14 (116)	Lost by 70 points	Etihad Stadium [H]	37,571	18th	
2	Saturday, 29 March (7:40 pm)	Sydney	10.9 (69)	12.17 (89)	Won by 20 points	ANZ Stadium [A]	32,347	12th	
3	Saturday, 5 April (7:40 pm)	Geelong	11.10 (76)	12.15 (87)	Lost by 11 points	MCG [H]	63,152	13th	
4	Friday, 11 April (7:50 pm)	Richmond	10.12 (72)	16.14 (110)	Won by 38 points	MCG [A]	62,100	9th	
5	Saturday, 19 April (1:40 pm)	North Melbourne	13.15 (93)	8.10 (58)	Won by 35 points	MCG [H]	57,116	6th	
6	Friday, 25 April (2:40 pm)	Essendon	12.11 (83)	8.12 (60)	Won by 23 points	MCG [H]	91,731	4th	
7	Friday, 2 May (7:50 pm)	Carlton	10.10 (70)	14.20 (104)	Won by 34 points	MCG [A]	68,251	4th	
8	Bye							5th	
9	Thursday, 15 May (7:20 pm)	Adelaide	10.16 (76)	7.13 (55)	Lost by 21 points	Adelaide Oval [A]	50,051	8th	
10	Saturday, 24 May (4:40 pm)	West Coast	17.7 (109)	15.11 (101)	Won by 8 points	MCG [H]	53,049	6th	
11	Friday, 30 May (7:50 pm)	St Kilda	8.6 (54)	21.14 (140)	Won by 86 points	Etihad Stadium [A]	34,855	4th	
12	Monday, 9 June (3:20 pm)	Melbourne	3.10 (28)	8.13 (61)	Won by 33 points	MCG [A]	68,124	4th	
13	Sunday, 15 June (3:20 pm)	Western Bulldogs	15.8 (98)	16.10 (106)	Lost by 8 points	Etihad Stadium [H]	28,339	6th	
14	Saturday, 21 June (2:10 pm)	Hawthorn	17.13 (115)	13.8 (86)	Lost by 29 points	MCG [A]	74,095	6th	
15	Sunday, 29 June (7:10 pm)	Carlton	13.13 (91)	11.10 (76)	Won by 15 points	MCG [H]	40,936	6th	
16	Saturday, 5 July (4:40 pm)	Gold Coast	11.14 (80)	10.15 (75)	Lost by 5 points	Metricon Stadium [A]	24,032	6th	
17	Sunday, 13 July (3:20 pm)	Essendon	16.7 (103)	5.9 (39)	Lost by 64 points	MCG [A]	58,992	8th	
18	Sunday, 27 July (4:40 pm)	Adelaide	12.10 (82)	14.14 (98)	Lost by 16 points	MCG [H]	41,482	9th	
19	Sunday, 3 August (4:40 pm)	Port Adelaide	11.10 (76)	10.10 (70)	Won by 6 points	MCG [H]	32,804	8th	
20	Sunday, 10 August (2:40 pm)	West Coast	19.12 (126)	10.6 (66)	Lost by 60 points	Patersons Stadium [A]	36,458	9th	
21	Saturday, 16 August (7:40 pm)	Brisbane Lions	8.8 (56)	18.15 (123)	Lost by 67 points	MCG [H]	32,926	10th	
22	Saturday, 23 August (4:40 pm)	Greater Western Sydney	9.13 (67)	11.9 (75)	Won by 8 points	Spotless Stadium [A]	10,851	9th	
23	Friday, 29 August (7:50 pm)	Hawthorn	8.8 (56)	18.13 (121)	Lost by 65 points	MCG [H]	48,973	11th	

== Ladder ==
2014 AFL ladder
Pos	Team	Pld	W	L	D	PF	PA	PP	Pts	
1	Sydney	22	17	5	0	2126	1488	142.9	68	Finals series
2	Hawthorn (P)	22	17	5	0	2458	1746	140.8	68	Finals series
3	Geelong	22	17	5	0	2033	1787	113.8	68	Finals series
4	Fremantle	22	16	6	0	2029	1556	130.4	64	Finals series
5	Port Adelaide	22	14	8	0	2180	1678	129.9	56	Finals series
6	North Melbourne	22	14	8	0	2026	1731	117.0	56	Finals series
7	Essendon	22	12	9	1	1828	1719	106.3	50	Finals series
8	Richmond	22	12	10	0	1887	1784	105.8	48	Finals series
9	West Coast	22	11	11	0	2045	1750	116.9	44	
10	Adelaide	22	11	11	0	2175	1907	114.1	44	
11	Collingwood	22	11	11	0	1766	1876	94.1	44	
12	Gold Coast	22	10	12	0	1917	2045	93.7	40	
13	Carlton	22	7	14	1	1891	2107	89.7	30	
14	Western Bulldogs	22	7	15	0	1784	2177	81.9	28	
15	Brisbane Lions	22	7	15	0	1532	2212	69.3	28	
16	Greater Western Sydney	22	6	16	0	1780	2320	76.7	24	
17	Melbourne	22	4	18	0	1336	1954	68.4	16	
18	St Kilda	22	4	18	0	1480	2436	60.8	16	

Source: AFL Tables
Rules for classification: 1) points; 2) percentage; 3) number of points for.
(P) Premiers

== Awards & Milestones ==
=== AFL Awards ===
- Anzac Medal – Dane Swan (Round 6)
- 2014 22under22 selection – Tom Langdon
- 2014 22under22 selection – Jamie Elliott
- 2014 22under22 selection – Jarrod Witts
- Member of the 2014 All-Australian team (Interchange) – Scott Pendlebury

=== AFL Award Nominations ===
- Round 3 – 2014 AFL Mark of the Year nomination – Jamie Elliott
- Round 6 – 2014 AFL Goal of the Year nomination – Dane Swan
- Round 7 – 2014 AFL Rising Star nomination – Tom Langdon
- Leigh Matthews Trophy nomination – Scott Pendlebury
- Leigh Matthews Trophy nomination – Dayne Beams
- Leigh Matthews Trophy nomination – Steele Sidebottom
- Robert Rose Award nomination – Nick Maxwell
- Best First Year Player nomination – Tom Langdon
- Best Captain nomination – Scott Pendlebury
- Madden Medal nomination – Nick Maxwell
- Madden Medal nomination – Luke Ball
- 2014 All-Australian team 40-man squad – Dayne Beams, Scott Pendlebury

=== Club Awards ===
- E.W. Copeland Trophy – Scott Pendlebury
- R.T. Rush Trophy – Steele Sidebottom
- J.J. Joyce Trophy – Dayne Beams
- J.F. McHale Trophy – Héritier Lumumba
- Jack Regan Trophy – Brent Macaffer
- Joseph Wren Memorial Trophy – Kyle Martin
- Darren Millane Memorial Trophy – Quinten Lynch
- Harry Collier Trophy – Tom Langdon
- Gordon Coventry Trophy – Travis Cloke
- Gavin Brown Award – Scott Pendlebury
- Magpie Army Player of the Year – Scott Pendlebury

=== Milestones ===
- Round 1 – Tom Langdon (AFL debut)
- Round 1 – Taylor Adams (Collingwood debut)
- Round 2 – Nick Maxwell (200 games)
- Round 2 – Jesse White (Collingwood debut)
- Round 4 – Travis Cloke (200 games)
- Round 5 – Dayne Beams (100 goals)
- Round 6 – Jamie Elliott (50 goals)
- Round 10 – Dayne Beams (100 games)
- VFL Round 8 – Sam Dwyer (100 VFL games)
- Round 11 – 30,000 Collingwood goals (first VFL/AFL team)
- Round 11 – Alex Fasolo (50 goals)
- Round 13 – Tim Broomhead (AFL debut)
- Round 18 – Jamie Elliott (50 games)
- Round 19 – Tony Armstrong (Collingwood debut)
- Round 21 – Alex Fasolo (50 games)
- Round 21 – Jarryd Blair (100 games)
- Round 22 – Jackson Ramsay (AFL debut)
- Round 23 – Corey Gault (AFL debut)

== VFL season ==
=== Results ===
Collingwood's 2014 VFL pre-season fixture
Date and local time	Opponent	Home	Away	Result	Venue	Ref
Date and local time	Opponent	Scores^{[c]}			Venue	Ref
Sunday, 23 February (2:00 pm)	Port Melbourne	8.10 (58)	6.7 (43)	Won by 15 points	Olympic Park Oval [H]	
Friday, 7 March (4:30 pm)	Richmond	11.13 (79)	8.4 (52)	Won by 27 points	Victoria Park [H]	
Saturday, 15 March (11:00 am)	Essendon	10.10 (70)	7.8 (50)	Won by 20 points	Victoria Park [H]	
Saturday, 22 March (1:00 pm)	Bendigo	16.14 (110)	2.7 (19)	Won by 91 points	Victoria Park [H]	
Friday, 4 April (4:20 pm)	AIS-AFL Academy	5.1 (31)	14.20 (104)	Won by 73 points	MCG [A]	

Collingwood's 2014 VFL season fixture
Round	Date and local time	Opponent	Home	Away	Result	Venue	Ladder position	Ref
Round	Date and local time	Opponent	Scores^{[c]}			Venue	Ladder position	Ref
1	Saturday, 29 March (1:00 pm)	North Ballarat	11.19 (85)	11.7 (73)	Won by 12 points	Victoria Park [H]	6th	
2	Saturday, 12 April (2:00 pm)	Port Melbourne	19.10 (124)	9.17 (71)	Lost by 53 points	North Port Oval [A]	11th	
3	Saturday, 19 April (11:00 am)	Coburg	15.17 (107)	9.9 (63)	Won by 44 points	Victoria Park [H]	9th	
4	Saturday, 26 April (1:10 pm)	Essendon	13.9 (87)	17.10 (112)	Won by 25 points	Windy Hill [A]	5th	
5	Sunday, 4 May (2:00 pm)	Williamstown	14.9 (93)	10.10 (70)	Lost by 23 points	Burbank Oval [A]	7th	
6	Bye						8th	
7	Saturday, 17 May (2:00 pm)	Bendigo	21.26 (152)	5.7 (37)	Won by 115 points	Victoria Park [H]	6th	
8	Saturday, 24 May (12:00 pm)	Geelong	19.12 (126)	12.14 (86)	Won by 40 points	Victoria Park [H]	5th	
9	Saturday, 7 June (2:00 pm)	Casey	11.7 (73)	11.13 (79)	Won by 6 points	Casey Fields [A]	4th	
10	Saturday, 14 June (2:00 pm)	Sandringham	14.20 (104)	8.12 (60)	Lost by 44 points	Trevor Barker Beach Oval [A]	5th	
11	Sunday, 22 June (2:00 pm)	Footscray	10.6 (69)	17.12 (114)	Lost by 45 points	Victoria Park [H]	7th	
12	Saturday, 28 June (2:00 pm)	Richmond	19.18 (132)	13.5 (83)	Won by 49 points	Morwell Recreation Reserve [H]	6th	
13	Sunday, 6 July (2:15 pm)	Northern Blues	16.9 (105)	12.15 (87)	Lost by 18 points	Preston City Oval [A]	6th	
14	Saturday, 12 July (1:00 pm)	Werribee	8.18 (66)	5.6 (36)	Won by 30 points	Victoria Park [H]	6th	
15	Bye							
16	Sunday, 27 July (2:00 pm)	Frankston	12.10 (82)	9.11 (65)	Lost by 17 points	Frankston Park [A]	7th	
17	Saturday, 2 August (1:00 pm)	Box Hill	13.14 (92)	12.9 (81)	Won by 11 points	Victoria Park [H]	7th	
18	Saturday, 9 August (1:00 pm)	Essendon	11.16 (82)	9.11 (65)	Won by 17 points	Victoria Park [H]	6th	
19	Saturday, 16 August (11:00 pm)	Geelong	12.16 (87)	16.5 (101)	Won by 14 points	Simonds Stadium [A]	5th	
20	Friday, 22 August (6:30 pm)	Bendigo	13.7 (85)	20.11 (131)	Won by 46 points	Queen Elizabeth Oval [A]	5th	

Collingwood's 2014 VFL finals series fixture
Round	Date and local time	Opponent	Home	Away	Result	Venue	Ref
Round	Date and local time	Opponent	Scores^{[c]}			Venue	Ref
1st Elimination Final	Saturday, 30 August (2:00 pm)	Sandringham	5.15 (45)	10.11 (71)	Lost by 26 points	Victoria Park [H]	
Collingwood was eliminated from the 2014 VFL finals series

=== Ladder ===
2014 VFL ladder
Pos	Team	Pld	W	L	D	PF	PA	PP	Pts	
3	Williamstown	18	14	4	0	1808	1290	140.2	56	Finals series
4	Box Hill Hawks	18	13	4	1	1856	1270	146.1	54	Finals series
5	Collingwood	18	12	6	0	1687	1486	113.5	48	Finals series
6	Werribee	18	10	8	0	1603	1360	117.9	40	Finals series
7	North Ballarat	18	10	8	0	1478	1389	106.4	40	Finals series

Source: Ladder for 2014 Peter Jackson VFL
Rules for classification: 1) points; 2) percentage; 3) number of points for.

== Notes ==
Key

- H Home match.
- A Away match.

Notes

- **^{a}** Collingwood's scores are indicated in **bold** font.
