= 2013 Collingwood Football Club season =

Collingwood's record-breaking 2013 AFL season.

Collingwood Football Club
2013 season
- President: Eddie McGuire
- Coach: Nathan Buckley (2nd season)
- Captains: Nick Maxwell (5th season)
- Home ground: The MCG
- Pre-season competition: 6th
- Regular season: 6th
- Finals series: Elimination Final
- Best and Fairest: Scott Pendlebury
- Leading goalkicker: Travis Cloke (68 goals)
- Highest home attendance: 93,373 vs. Essendon (Round 5)
- Lowest home attendance: 32,691 vs. Greater Western Sydney (Round 18)
- Average home attendance: 55,487
- Club membership: 80,456

The 2013 Collingwood Football Club season was the club's 117th season of senior competition in the Australian Football League (AFL). The club also fielded its reserves team in the VFL.

The club signed a total of 80,456 members for the 2013 season, setting a new VFL/AFL record for total club membership in a season.

== Squad ==
Players are listed by guernsey number, and 2013 statistics are for AFL regular season and finals series matches during the 2013 AFL season only. Career statistics include a player's complete AFL career, which, as a result, means that a player's debut and part or whole of their career statistics may be for another club. Statistics are correct as of 2nd Elimination Final of the 2013 season (7 September 2013) and are taken from AFL Tables

No.	Name	AFL debut	Games (2013)	Goals (2013)	Games (CFC)	Goals (CFC)	Games (AFL career)	Goals (AFL career)
1	Alex Fasolo	2011	3	1	40	45	40	45
2	Jordan Russell	2005 (Carlton)	9	0	9	0	125	18
3	Brent Macaffer	2009	22	7	52	28	52	28
4	Alan Didak	2001	5	3	218	274	218	274
5	Nick Maxwell (c)	2004	19	1	198	29	198	29
6	Tyson Goldsack	2007	13	6	104	37	104	37
7	Andrew Krakouer	2001 (Richmond)	8	10	35	50	137	152
8	Harry O'Brien	2005	19	7	178	25	178	25
9	Martin Clarke	2007	9	3	72	19	72	19
10	Scott Pendlebury (vc)	2006	23	18	171	113	171	113
11	Jarryd Blair	2010	22	14	81	64	81	64
12	Luke Ball	2003 (St Kilda)	13	2	64	27	206	85
13	Dale Thomas	2006	5	0	157	121	157	121
14	Clinton Young	2005 (Hawthorn)	2	0	2	0	118	60
15	Jarrod Witts	2013	7	5	7	5	7	5
16	Nathan Brown	2008	22	1	90	7	90	7
17	Dayne Beams	2009	8	6	91	95	91	95
18	Darren Jolly	2001 (Melbourne)	9	4	71	52	237	122
19	Jamie Elliott	2012	20	30	35	36	35	36
20	Ben Reid	2007	22	25	95	30	95	30
21	Quinten Lynch	2002 (West Coast)	18	9	18	9	227	290
22	Steele Sidebottom	2009	23	19	108	85	108	85
23	Lachlan Keeffe	2011	8	1	22	6	22	6
24	Josh Thomas	2013	19	11	19	11	19	11
25	Ben Hudson	2004 (Adelaide)	7	1	7	1	168	19
26	Ben Johnson	2000	3	0	235	70	235	70
27	Ben Kennedy	2013	12	9	12	9	12	9
28	Ben Sinclair	2011	15	2	39	18	39	18
29	Tim Broomhead	****	0	0	0	0	0	0
30	Ben Richmond	****	0	0	0	0	0	0
31	Jackson Ramsay	****	0	0	0	0	0	0
32	Travis Cloke	2005	22	68	196	351	196	351
33	Jackson Paine	2012	0	0	6	8	6	8
34	Alan Toovey	2007	5	0	114	8	114	8
35	Brodie Grundy	2013	7	1	7	1	7	1
36	Dane Swan	2003	23	21	219	179	219	179
37	Kyle Martin	2013	4	6	4	6	4	6
38	Peter Yagmoor	2012	0	0	2	0	2	0
39	Heath Shaw	2005	20	1	173	37	173	37
40	Paul Seedsman	2012	17	9	28	11	28	11
41	Sam Dwyer	2013	21	15	21	15	21	15
43	Adam Oxley	2013	2	0	2	0	2	0
44	Corey Gault	****	0	0	0	0	0	0
45	Jack Frost	2013	2	0	2	0	2	0
46	Marley Williams	2012	16	2	22	3	22	3
47	Michael Hartley	****	0	0	0	0	0	0
48	Caolan Mooney	2012	2	1	6	2	6	2

=== Squad changes ===
==== In ====
No.	Name	Position	Previous club	via
21	(Western Australia) Quinten Lynch	Utility	West Coast	free agent
14	(Victoria (state)) Clinton Young	Midfielder / Forward	Hawthorn	free agent
2	(South Australia) Jordan Russell	Defender	Carlton	trade
35	(South Australia) Brodie Grundy	Ruckman	Sturt	AFL National Draft, first round (pick #18)
27	(South Australia) Ben Kennedy	Small Forward / Midfielder	Glenelg	AFL National Draft, first round (pick #19)
29	(South Australia) Tim Broomhead	Midfielder	Port Adelaide Magpies	AFL National Draft, first round (pick #20)
31	(Western Australia) Jackson Ramsay	Defender	East Perth	AFL National Draft, second round (pick #38)
37	(Victoria (state)) Kyle Martin	Midfielder	Frankston	AFL Rookie Draft, first round (pick #13)
41	(Victoria (state)) Sam Dwyer	Midfielder / Small Forward	Port Melbourne	AFL Rookie Draft, second round (pick #27)
43	(Queensland) Adam Oxley	Defender	Redland	AFL Rookie Draft, third round (pick #35)
45	(Victoria (state)) Jack Frost	Defender	Williamstown	AFL Rookie Draft, fourth round (pick #41)
25	(Victoria (state)) Ben Hudson	Ruckman	Brisbane Lions	AFL Rookie Draft, fifth round (pick #47)
38	(Queensland) Peter Yagmoor	Defender / Midfielder	Collingwood	AFL Rookie Draft, sixth round (pick #49)
30	(Tasmania) Ben Richmond	Forward / Defender		AFL Rookie Draft, seventh round (pick #53)

==== Out ====
No.	Name	Position	New Club	via
41	(Victoria (state)) Daniel Farmer	Forward		delisted
43	(New South Wales) Trent Stubbs	Forward		delisted
45	(Victoria (state)) Lachlan Smith	Forward		delisted
49	(Republic of Ireland) Paul Cribbin	Forward		delisted
50	(United States) Shae McNamara	Forward		delisted
21	(Western Australia) Sharrod Wellingham	Midfielder	West Coast	trade
31	(Victoria (state)) Chris Dawes	Forward	Melbourne	trade
25	(New South Wales) Tom Young	Defender	Western Bulldogs	trade
14	(Victoria (state)) Luke Rounds	Forward		delisted
19	(South Australia) Cameron Wood	Ruckman		delisted
27	(Victoria (state)) Simon Buckley	Defender		delisted
29	(Victoria (state)) Jonathon Ceglar	Ruckman		delisted
37	(Western Australia) Kirk Ugle	Forward		delisted
38	(Queensland) Peter Yagmoor	Defender / Midfielder		delisted
26	(Victoria (state)) Ben Johnson	Defender / Midfielder		retired

== Season summary ==
=== Pre-season matches ===
Collingwood's 2013 NAB Cup fixtures (Week 1 – Lightning matches)
Round	Date and local time	Opponent	Scores^{[a]}			Venue	Attendance	Ladder position	Ref
Round	Date and local time	Opponent	Home	Away	Result	Venue	Attendance	Ladder position	Ref
1	Friday, 15 February (7:50 pm)	Western Bulldogs	0.4.5 (29)	1.6.2 (47)	Won by 18 points	Etihad Stadium [A]	26,693	3rd	
1	Friday, 15 February (8:55 pm)	Essendon	0.4.5 (29)	1.2.10 (31)	Won by 2 points	Etihad Stadium [A]	26,921	3rd	

Collingwood's 2013 NAB Cup fixtures (Weeks 2, 3 & 4 – Full-length matches)
Round	Date and local time	Opponent	Scores^{[a]}			Venue	Attendance	Ladder position	Ref
Round	Date and local time	Opponent	Home	Away	Result	Venue	Attendance	Ladder position	Ref
2	Sunday, 3 March (4:40 pm)	West Coast	1.10.7 (76)	3.10.9 (96)	Won by 20 points	Patersons Stadium [A]	14,237	3rd	
3	Saturday, 9 March (6:40 pm)	Brisbane Lions	0.7.12 (54)	0.12.16 (88)	Lost by 34 points	Etihad Stadium [H]	12,093	6th	
4	Friday, 15 March (4:00 pm)	Geelong	20.21 (141)	13.12 (90)	Lost by 51 points	Simonds Stadium [A]	TBA	—N/a	

=== Regular season ===
Collingwood's 2013 AFL season fixtures
Round	Date and local time	Opponent	Home	Away	Result	Venue	Attendance	Ladder position	Ref
Round	Date and local time	Opponent	Scores^{[a]}			Venue	Attendance	Ladder position	Ref
1	Sunday, 31 March (4:40 pm)	North Melbourne	13.9 (87)	15.13 (103)	Won by 16 points	Etihad Stadium [A]	41,040	6th	
2	Sunday, 7 April (3:20 pm)	Carlton	17.15 (117)	15.10 (100)	Won by 17 points	MCG [H]	84,247	5th	
3	Sunday, 14 April (3:20 pm)	Hawthorn	13.12 (90)	22.13 (145)	Lost by 55 points	MCG [H]	72,254	8th	
4	Saturday, 20 April (2:10 pm)	Richmond	11.13 (79)	16.17 (113)	Won by 34 points	MCG [A]	81,950	7th	
5	Thursday, 25 April (2:40 pm)	Essendon	18.13 (121)	10.15 (75)	Lost by 46 points	MCG [A]	93,373	8th	
6	Friday, 3 May (7:50 pm)	St Kilda	15.13 (103)	11.11 (77)	Won by 26 points	MCG [H]	40,071	7th	
7	Saturday, 11 May (5:40 pm)	Fremantle	15.10 (100)	10.13 (73)	Lost by 27 points	Patersons Stadium [A]	37,214	8th	
8	Saturday, 18 May (7:40 pm)	Geelong	15.12 (102)	14.12 (96)	Won by 6 points	MCG [H]	66,768	8th	
9	Friday, 24 May (7:50 pm)	Sydney	8.7 (55)	15.12 (102)	Lost by 47 points	MCG [H]	65,306	11th	
10	Friday, 31 May (7:50 pm)	Brisbane Lions	7.9 (51)	14.16 (100)	Won by 49 points	Gabba [A]	26,626	8th	
11	Monday, 10 June (3:15 pm)	Melbourne	5.9 (39)	17.20 (122)	Won by 83 points	MCG [A]	50,835	6th	
12	Sunday, 16 June (4:40 pm)	Western Bulldogs	15.9 (99)	9.11 (65)	Won by 34 points	Etihad Stadium [H]	32,253	6th	
13	Bye							7th	
14	Saturday, 29 June (4:10 pm)	Port Adelaide	13.8 (86)	7.9 (51)	Lost by 35 points	AAMI Stadium [A]	31,121	8th	
15	Friday, 5 July (7:50 pm)	Carlton	12.5 (77)	17.16 (118)	Won by 41 points	MCG [A]	78,224	7th	
16	Friday, 12 July (7:50 pm)	Adelaide	17.9 (111)	12.12 (84)	Won by 27 points	MCG [H]	54,790	7th	
17	Saturday, 20 July (4:40 pm)	Gold Coast	13.7 (85)	11.12 (78)	Lost by 7 points	Carrara Stadium [A]	19,721	7th	
18	Saturday, 27 July (4:40 pm)	Greater Western Sydney	15.16 (106)	10.6 (66)	Won by 40 points	MCG [H]	32,691	7th	
19	Sunday, 4 August (4:40 pm)	Essendon	20.13 (133)	7.12 (54)	Won by 79 points	MCG [H]	69,821	6th	
20	Saturday, 10 August (7:40 pm)	Sydney	10.11 (71)	14.16 (100)	Won by 29 points	ANZ Stadium [A]	42,627	5th	
21	Friday, 16 August (7:50 pm)	Hawthorn	18.11 (119)	12.12 (84)	Lost by 35 points	MCG [A]	71,533	6th	
22	Friday, 23 August (7:50 pm)	West Coast	15.11 (101)	5.9 (39)	Won by 62 points	MCG [H]	41,198	6th	
23	Sunday, 1 September (3:20 pm)	North Melbourne	17.12 (114)	19.11 (125)	Lost by 11 points	MCG [H]	50,958	6th	

=== Finals series ===
Collingwood's 2013 AFL finals series fixtures
Round	Date and local time	Opponent	Home	Away	Result	Venue	Attendance	Ref
Round	Date and local time	Opponent	Scores^{[a]}			Venue	Attendance	Ref
2nd Elimination Final	Saturday, 7 September (7:45 pm)	Port Adelaide	9.9 (63)	12.15 (87)	Lost by 24 points	MCG [H]	51,722	
Collingwood was eliminated from the 2013 AFL finals series

== Ladder ==
2013 AFL ladder
Pos	Team	Pld	W	L	D	PF	PA	PP	Pts	
1	Hawthorn (P)	22	19	3	0	2523	1859	135.7	76	Finals series
2	Geelong	22	18	4	0	2409	1776	135.6	72	Finals series
3	Fremantle	22	16	5	1	2035	1518	134.1	66	Finals series
4	Sydney	22	15	6	1	2244	1694	132.5	62	Finals series
5	Richmond	22	15	7	0	2154	1754	122.8	60	Finals series
6	Collingwood	22	14	8	0	2148	1868	115.0	56	Finals series
7	Port Adelaide	22	12	10	0	2051	2002	102.4	48	Finals series
8	Carlton	22	11	11	0	2125	1992	106.7	44	Finals series
9	Essendon	22	14	8	0	2145	2000	107.3	56 (Note: Essendon was relegated to ninth due to irregularities in its supplements program during the 2012 season.)	
10	North Melbourne	22	10	12	0	2307	1930	119.5	40	
11	Adelaide	22	10	12	0	2064	1909	108.1	40	
12	Brisbane Lions	22	10	12	0	1922	2144	89.6	40	
13	West Coast	22	9	13	0	2038	2139	95.3	36	
14	Gold Coast	22	8	14	0	1918	2091	91.7	32	
15	Western Bulldogs	22	8	14	0	1926	2262	85.1	32	
16	St Kilda	22	5	17	0	1751	2120	82.6	20	
17	Melbourne	22	2	20	0	1455	2691	54.1	8	
18	Greater Western Sydney	22	1	21	0	1524	2990	51.0	4	

Source: AFL Tables
Rules for classification: 1) points; 2) percentage; 3) number of points for.
(P) Premiers

== Awards, Records & Milestones ==
=== AFL Awards ===
- AFLCA's Champion Player of the Year – Scott Pendlebury
- AFLCA's Assistant Coach of the Year – Robert Harvey
- Member of the 2013 All-Australian team (left-wingman) – Scott Pendlebury
- Member of the 2013 All-Australian team (centre half-forward) – Travis Cloke
- Member of the 2013 All-Australian team (ruck rover) – Dane Swan
- Jason McCartney Medal – Scott Pendlebury (Round 1)
- Bob Rose–Charlie Sutton Medal – Heath Shaw (Round 12)
- 2013 AFL Mark of the Year – Jamie Elliott (Round 14)

=== AFL Award Nominations ===
- Round 5 – 2013 AFL Mark of the Year nomination – Jarryd Blair
- Round 12 – 2013 AFL Mark of the Year nomination – Heath Shaw
- Round 15 – 2013 AFL Goal of the Year nomination – Sam Dwyer
- Round 16 – 2013 AFL Mark of the Year nomination – Travis Cloke
- Round 17 – 2013 AFL Mark of the Year nomination – Jamie Elliott
- Round 18 – 2013 AFL Rising Star nomination – Marley Williams
- Round 21 – 2013 AFL Goal of the Year nomination – Dayne Beams
- Round 22 – 2013 AFL Rising Star nomination – Brodie Grundy
- Round 23 – 2013 AFL Goal of the Year nomination – Alan Didak
- Jim Stynes Community Leadership Award nomination – Nick Maxwell

=== Club Awards ===
- E.W. Copeland Trophy – Scott Pendlebury
- R.T. Rush Trophy – Dane Swan
- J.J. Joyce Trophy – Steele Sidebottom
- J.F. McHale Trophy – Travis Cloke
- Jack Regan Trophy – Harry O'Brien
- Joseph Wren Memorial Trophy – Kyle Martin
- Darren Millane Memorial Trophy – Scott Pendlebury
- Harry Collier Trophy – Josh Thomas
- Gordon Coventry Trophy – Travis Cloke
- Gavin Brown Award – Jarryd Blair
- Bob Rose Award – Dane Swan
- Magpie Army Player of the Year – Dane Swan

=== Milestones ===
- Round 1 – Sam Dwyer (AFL debut)
- Round 1 – Jack Frost (AFL debut)
- Round 1 – Josh Thomas (AFL debut)
- Round 1 – Quinten Lynch (Collingwood debut)
- Round 1 – Jordan Russell (Collingwood debut)
- Round 2 – Scott Pendlebury (150 games)
- Round 3 – Ben Hudson (Collingwood debut)
- Round 4 – Dane Swan (200 games)
- Round 5 – Scott Pendlebury (100 goals)
- Round 6 – Jarrod Witts (AFL debut)
- Round 6 – Ben Kennedy (AFL debut)
- Round 6 – Darren Jolly (50 Collingwood goals)
- Round 10 – Kyle Martin (AFL debut)
- Round 11 – Travis Cloke (300 goals)
- Round 11 – Adam Oxley (AFL debut)
- Round 15 – Clinton Young (Collingwood debut)
- Round 16 – Luke Ball (200 games)
- Round 16 – Steele Sidebottom (100 games)
- Round 16 – Andrew Krakouer (150 goals)
- Round 18 – Brodie Grundy (AFL debut)
- Round 20 – Tyson Goldsack (100 games)
- Round 20 – Nick Maxwell (100 games as captain)
- Round 22 – Brent Macaffer (50 games)
- 2nd Elimination Final – Travis Cloke (350 goals)

== VFL season ==
=== Results ===
Collingwood's 2013 VFL pre-season fixture
Date and local time	Opponent	Home	Away	Result	Venue	Ref
Date and local time	Opponent	Scores^{[c]}			Venue	Ref
Saturday, 9 March (11:00 am)	Essendon	11.9 (75)	15.9 (99)	Lost by 24 points	Victoria Park [H]	
Saturday, 16 March (12:00 pm)	Geelong	14.9 (103)	12.5 (77)	Lost by 26 points	Simonds Stadium [A]	
Friday, 22 March (4:00 pm)	Northern Blues	12.10 (82)	6.5 (41)	Lost by 41 points	Visy Park [A]	
Thursday, 28 March (4:00 pm)	AIS-AFL Academy	15.15 (105)	9.9 (63)	Won by 42 points	MCG [H]	

Collingwood's 2013 VFL season fixture
Round	Date and local time	Opponent	Home	Away	Result	Venue	Ladder position	Ref
Round	Date and local time	Opponent	Scores^{[c]}			Venue	Ladder position	Ref
1	Saturday, 6 April (1:10 pm)	North Ballarat	16.11 (107)	6.19 (55)	Won by 52 points	Victoria Park [H]	2nd	
2	Saturday, 13 April (7:00 pm)	Werribee	12.14 (86)	11.12 (78)	Lost by 8 points	Avalon Airport Oval [A]	6th	
3	Saturday, 20 April (2:00 pm)	Frankston	12.11 (83)	14.12 (96)	Lost by 13 points	Victoria Park [H]	7th	
4	Friday, 26 April (6:30 pm)	Bendigo	9.6 (60)	25.26 (176)	Won by 116 points	Queen Elizabeth Oval [A]	6th	
5	Sunday, 5 May (2:00 pm)	Williamstown	15.13 (103)	14.13 (97)	Lost by 6 points	Burbank Oval [A]	8th	
6	Saturday, 18 May (1:00 pm)	Geelong	18.12 (120)	16.11 (107)	Won by 13 points	Victoria Park [H]	8th	
7	Saturday, 25 May (1:00 pm)	Essendon	18.14 (122)	17.11 (113)	Won by 9 points	Victoria Park [H]	7th	
8	Saturday, 1 June (1:10 pm)	Northern Blues	17.9 (111)	17.12 (114)	Won by 3 points	Preston City Oval [A]	6th	
9	Sunday, 8 June (2:00 pm)	Casey	21.15 (141)	7.9 (51)	Lost by 90 points	Casey Fields [A]	6th	
10	Sunday, 16 June (2:00 pm)	Coburg	18.10 (118)	13.12 (90)	Won by 28 points	Victoria Park [H]	6th	
11	Bye						6th	
12	Saturday, 29 June (1:00 pm)	Port Melbourne	11.9 (75)	8.15 (63)	Won by 12 points	Victoria Park [H]	5th	
13	Saturday, 6 July (2:00 pm)	Box Hill	11.14 (80)	12.15 (87)	Won by 7 points	Box Hill City Oval [A]	5th	
14	Friday, 19 July (7:00 pm)	Geelong	17.15 (117)	10.14 (74)	Lost by 43 points	Simonds Stadium [A]	6th	
15	Saturday, 27 July (12:00 pm)	Casey	12.10 (82)	13.12 (90)	Lost by 8 points	Victoria Park [H]	6th	
16	Sunday, 4 August (1:00 pm)	Williamstown	10.4 (64)	14.15 (99)	Lost by 35 points	Victoria Park [H]	7th	
17	Sunday, 11 August (2:00 pm)	North Ballarat	14.12 (96)	13.13 (91)	Lost by 5 points	Eureka Stadium [A]	9th	
18	Saturday, 17 August (2:00 pm)	Sandringham	10.9 (69)	18.21 (129)	Won by 60 points	Trevor Barker Beach Oval [A]	6th	
19	Saturday, 24 August (11:00 am)	Werribee	15.8 (98)	13.13 (91)	Won by 7 points	Victoria Park [H]	6th	

Collingwood's 2013 VFL finals series fixture
Round	Date and local time	Opponent	Home	Away	Result	Venue	Ref
Round	Date and local time	Opponent	Scores^{[c]}			Venue	Ref
2nd Elimination Final	Saturday, 31 August (2:10 pm)	Port Melbourne	12.8 (80)	16.9 (105)	Lost by 25 points	North Port Oval [H]	
Collingwood was eliminated from the 2013 VFL finals series

=== Ladder ===
Pos	Team	Pld	W	L	D	PF	PA	PP	Pts	Qualification
1	Geelong	18	16	2	0	2273	1363	166.8	64	Finals series
2	Box Hill (P)	18	13	5	0	1815	1326	136.9	52	Finals series
3	Williamstown	18	12	6	0	1809	1394	129.8	48	Finals series
4	Casey	18	12	6	0	1830	1434	127.6	48	Finals series
5	Werribee	18	10	8	0	1897	1661	114.2	40	Finals series
6	Collingwood	18	10	8	0	1766	1667	105.9	40	Finals series
7	Port Melbourne	18	9	8	1	1726	1704	101.3	38	Finals series
8	Essendon	18	9	9	0	1765	1590	111.0	36	Finals series
9	Northern Blues	18	8	10	0	1709	1622	105.4	32	
10	North Ballarat	18	8	10	0	1556	1558	99.9	32	
11	Sandringham	18	6	11	1	1705	1992	85.6	26	
12	Frankston	18	6	12	0	1522	1885	80.7	24	
13	Coburg	18	6	12	0	1533	1973	77.7	24	
14	Bendigo	18	0	18	0	912	2649	34.4	0	

Source: Ladder for 2013 Peter Jackson VFL
Rules for classification: 1) points; 2) percentage; 3) number of points for.
(P) Premiers

== Notes ==
Key

- H Home match.
- A Away match.

Notes

- **^{a}** Collingwood's scores are indicated in **bold** font.
