= Ben Kennedy (Australian rules footballer) =

Australian rules footballer (born 1994)

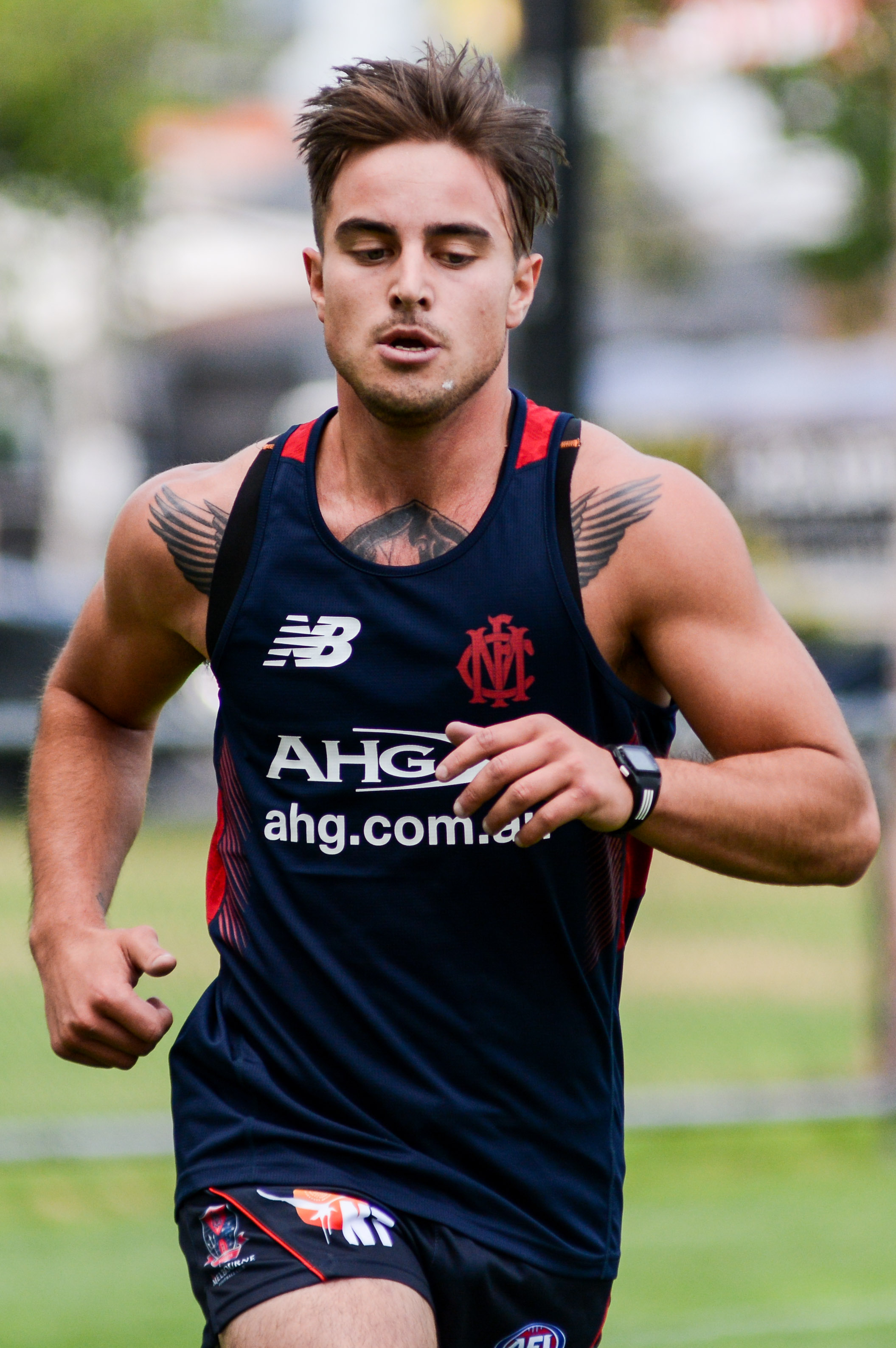
- Kennedy at training in November 2015

Personal information
- Full name: Benjamin Kennedy
- Born: 3 March 1994 (age 32)
- Original team: Glenelg (SANFL)
- Draft: No. 19, 2012 national draft
- Debut: Round 6, 2013, Collingwood vs. St Kilda, at MCG
- Height: 175 cm (5 ft 9 in)
- Weight: 78 kg (172 lb)
- Position: Forward / midfielder

Playing career^{1}
Years	Club	Games (Goals)
2013–2015	Collingwood	25 (15)
2016–2017	Melbourne	15 (13)
Total		40 (28)
- ^{1} Playing statistics correct to the end of 2017.

Ben Kennedy (born 3 March 1994) is a former professional Australian rules footballer who played for the Collingwood Football Club and Melbourne Football Club in the Australian Football League (AFL). A small forward, 1.75 metres (5 ft 9 in) tall and weighing 78 kilograms (172 lb), Kennedy is able to contribute as a crumbing forward and is also capable of moving into the midfield. He played top-level football from a young age by representing South Australia from fifteen years of age, including as a bottom aged player in the 2011 AFL Under 18 Championships, and playing in Glenelg's senior side in the South Australian National Football League (SANFL) at seventeen. His junior achievements included two-time selection in the under 18 All-Australian side, a SANFL star search nomination, and selection in the South Australian under 18 team of the decade. He was recruited by the Collingwood Football Club with the nineteenth selection in the 2012 AFL draft and he made his debut in the 2013 season. He played three seasons with Collingwood for a total of twenty-five matches before he was traded to Melbourne during the 2015 trade period. In October 2017, Kennedy was delisted by Melbourne after managing only 15 games in two seasons.

== Junior career ==
Kennedy played his junior career with the Brighton Bombers before moving to the Glenelg Football Club in the South Australian National Football League (SANFL); he attended Sacred Heart College. He received state honours by representing South Australia in the 2010 under 16 championships and he was their leading goalkicker with ten goals from three matches. He made his SANFL debut for Glenelg at seventeen years of age in the opening round match in 2011 against the Sturt Football Club at Glenelg Oval. He played fifteen matches for Glenelg in his debut season, kicking twelve goals and he was named Glenelg's best player in round eight and twenty-two against Sturt and Port Adelaide respectively. He was named as the round eight Star Search nominee, which "recognises the talented youngsters making their mark in league ranks", where he recorded twenty-six disposals, five marks and four goals. He received mid-year state honours through selection for South Australia in the 2011 AFL Under 18 Championships as a bottom-aged player and his performances in the championships saw him rewarded with being named in the All-Australian team in the forward pocket.

Throughout 2011, speculation arose as to whether Kennedy would be one of the two players selected in the 2011 mini-draft with the Adelaide Football Club and Port Adelaide Football Club potentially bidding for him. Then Port Adelaide football operations manager, Peter Rohde praised his skills by indicating "there is no doubt he will be a good AFL player...he's an outstanding kick and clever around goal, and clearly we have an interest in him." AFL national talent manager, Kevin Sheehan noted he is a "powerful small forward with a penetrating left foot. He is a goal kicker with pace and ability to compete well in the air for his size." He ultimately was not bid on for the 2011 mini-draft after the concession requested by Greater Western Sydney was too high. He received a scholarship within the prestigious AIS-AFL Academy with their level two, thirty-one man squad for 2012.

He can be a game breaker – with three or four really good possessions he can hurt the opposition pretty quickly. He's got a pretty good engine and if given the opportunity in the midfield he can get high numbers.

— Ken Applegarth, Glenelg football manager

Returning to Glenelg in 2012, he managed four matches for the season after being affected by a groin injury at the start of the season. After recruiters noted they wanted to see him spend more time in the midfield, he spent the year in a dual on-ball, forward role. He was again selected for South Australia in the 2012 AFL Under 18 Championships where he had strong performances against Tasmania and Northern Territory, recording thirty-seven disposals and fours goals, and twenty-nine disposals and a goal respectively. He was named in the All-Australian side for the second consecutive season in the forward pocket. His two seasons in the under 18's with South Australia saw him named in the South Australian under 18 team of the decade 2007–2016 side in the forward pocket.

== AFL career ==
=== 2013–2015: Early career with Collingwood ===
After predictions Kennedy would be drafted inside the top twenty in the 2012 national draft, he was recruited by the Collingwood Football Club with their second selection and nineteenth overall. He played in the round two and round three matches in the 2013 NAB Cup against the West Coast Eagles and Brisbane Lions respectively, and he was named the third best player for Collingwood against Brisbane, where he recorded nineteen disposals, four marks and a goal. He started the 2013 season playing for the Collingwood reserves in the Victorian Football League (VFL) and he made his AFL debut in the twenty-six point win against the St Kilda Football Club at Etihad Stadium in round six. He was the substitute for the match and he was brought into the game in the third quarter and recorded eight disposals from 33 percent game time. He finished the season with twelve games, and he was the substitute in six matches, he averaged 11.8 disposals and kicked nine goals with a season-best three goals in the Queen's Birthday Clash against the Melbourne Football Club in round eleven at the Melbourne Cricket Ground.

Kennedy had a small delay to the 2014 pre-season when he had surgery to relieve the symptoms of compartment syndrome in his legs. He played in the opening match of the season against the Fremantle Football Club at Etihad Stadium where he was the substitute and he replaced Martin Clarke in the third quarter. He was omitted from the side the next week and despite strong performances in the VFL, he played only one senior match in the next fourteen weeks where he was the late replacement for the injured Nick Maxwell in the round seven, thirty-four point win against the Carlton Football Club at the Melbourne Cricket Ground. He returned to the senior side in the fifteen point win against Carlton in round fifteen as the substitute, again as a late replacement for an injured player, he played five of the remaining eight matches, and he finished the season with eight matches in total and he was the substitute in five of the matches.

Kennedy struggled to gain senior selection in the first half of 2015 and his first senior match of the year was in the Queen's Birthday, twenty-five point win against Melbourne in round ten where he was the substitute. This prompted speculation in the middle of the year that he was on the outer and he may be traded at the end of the season to try and gain more senior selection. He managed five matches for the season and after twenty five matches in total for Collingwood in three seasons, he was traded to the Melbourne Football Club in October even though he was contracted to Collingwood until the end of 2016. He cited the opportunity for more senior games as the reason for his move to Melbourne.

=== 2016–2017: Move to Melbourne ===
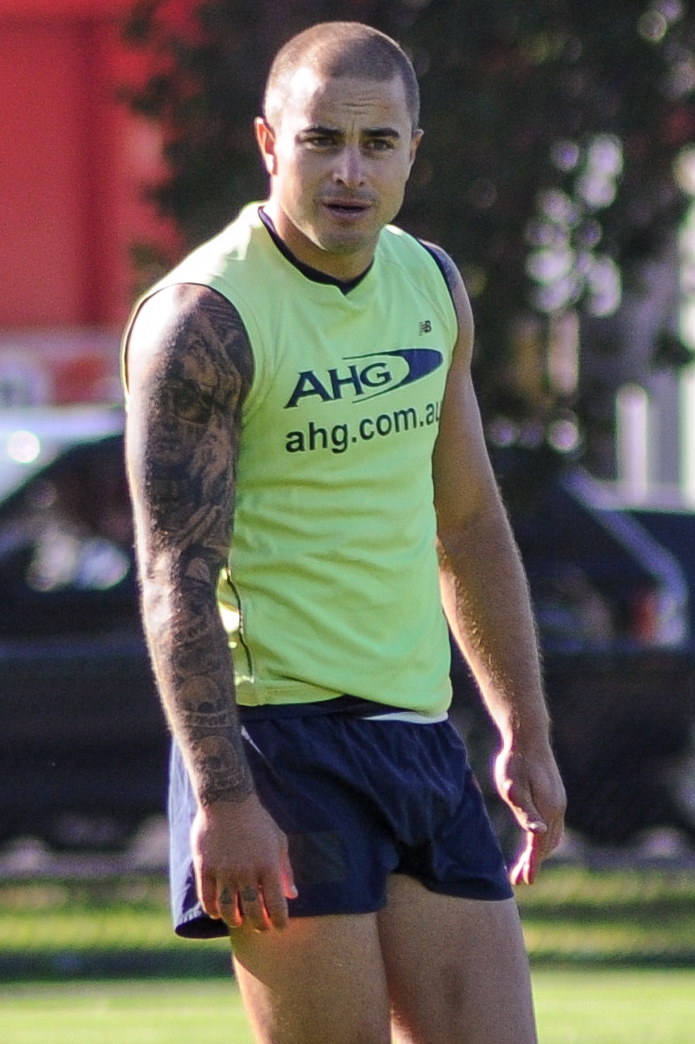
Kennedy at training in March 2017

Kennedy played all three matches in the 2016 NAB Challenge for his new club and he was named in the best players in the first match against the Port Adelaide Football Club at Elizabeth Oval, and his performances in the NAB Challenge saw AFL Media journalist, Travis King, predict he would play his first match for Melbourne in round one. He ultimately played the round one match against Greater Western Sydney in a two-point win at the Melbourne Cricket Ground. He was praised for his match which was labelled as impressive, and he was named as Melbourne's second best player by AFL Media. He played the first ten matches before being omitted for the match against the Hawthorn Football Club at the Melbourne Cricket Ground in round eleven. He played in the VFL for Melbourne's affiliate team, the Casey Scorpions, where he recorded thirty disposals, ten tackles and three goals, and he was brought back into the senior side the next week for the Queen's Birthday match against Collingwood. He played the next five matches before being dropped for the round eighteen match against West Coast at Domain Stadium He played the remainder of the season for Casey and he played in the losing grand final against Footscray at Etihad Stadium. He played fifteen matches in his first season for Melbourne, which resulted in a twenty-first place finish in the best and fairest count. After not managing a senior game in 2017, Kennedy was delisted by Melbourne.

== Statistics ==
Statistics are correct to the end of the 2017 season

Legend
G	Goals	K	Kicks	D	Disposals	T	Tackles
B	Behinds	H	Handballs	M	Marks

Season	Team	No.	Games	Totals							Averages (per game)						
Season	Team	No.	Games	G	B	K	H	D	M	T	G	B	K	H	D	M	T
2013	Collingwood	27	12	9	6	66	75	141	20	20	0.8	0.5	5.5	6.3	11.8	1.7	1.7
2014	Collingwood	7	8	4	2	54	44	98	11	15	0.5	0.3	6.8	5.5	12.3	1.4	1.9
2015	Collingwood	7	5	2	2	32	23	55	9	11	0.4	0.4	6.4	4.6	11.0	1.8	2.2
2016	Melbourne	35	15	13	6	128	131	259	47	39	0.9	0.4	8.5	8.7	17.2	3.1	2.6
2017	Melbourne	35	0	—	—	—	—	—	—	—	—	—	—	—	—	—	—
Career			40	28	16	280	273	553	87	85	0.7	0.4	7.0	6.8	13.8	2.2	2.1
