= Matthew Goodyear =

Australian rules footballer

Personal information
- Full name: Matthew Goodyear
- Born: 20 July 1996 (age 30)
- Original team: Calder Cannons (TAC Cup)
- Draft: 48th pick, 2014 National Draft
- Height: 188 cm (6 ft 2 in)
- Weight: 90 kg (198 lb)
- Position: Midfielder

Playing career^{1}
Years	Club	Games (Goals)
2015–2016	Collingwood	2 (0)
- ^{1} Playing statistics correct to the end of 2016.

Matthew Goodyear (born 20 July 1996) is a former professional Australian rules footballer who last played for the Collingwood Football Club in the Australian Football League (AFL). Matthew is now a current committed American Football Punter for Fresno State University in the NCAA Mountain West Conference.

Originally from Mount Macedon, Goodyear was drafted by Collingwood with the 48th overall pick in the 2014 national draft. Goodyear made his debut against St Kilda in Round 3, 2016.

In 2016, he played two senior games for Collingwood and he was delisted at the end of the season.

== Statistics ==
Legend
G	Goals	K	Kicks	D	Disposals	T	Tackles
B	Behinds	H	Handballs	M	Marks

Season	Team	No.	Games	Totals							Averages (per game)						
Season	Team	No.	Games	G	B	K	H	D	M	T	G	B	K	H	D	M	T
2015	Collingwood	38	0	—	—	—	—	—	—	—	—	—	—	—	—	—	—
2016	Collingwood	27	2	0	1	10	8	18	5	2	0.0	0.5	5.0	4.0	9.0	2.5	1.0
Career			2	0	1	10	8	18	5	2	0.0	0.5	5.0	4.0	9.0	2.5	1.0
