= 2013 AFL Mark of the Year =

- Date: 29 June
- Location: AAMI Stadium
- Winner: Jamie Elliott (Collingwood)

The Australian Football League celebrates the best mark of the season through the annual Mark of the Year competition. In 2013, this is officially known as the Lifebroker AFL Mark of the Year. Each round three marks are nominated and fans are able to vote online for their favourite here.

== Winners by Round ==
Legend

= Round's Winning Mark

Round	Nominees	Team	% of votes	Opposition	Ground
1	Sam Reid	Sydney		Greater Western Sydney	ANZ Stadium
1	Jay Schulz	Port Adelaide	86%	Melbourne	MCG
1	Andrew Embley	West Coast		Fremantle	Patersons Stadium
2	Luke McGuane	Richmond		St Kilda	MCG
2	Jack Riewoldt	Richmond		St Kilda	MCG
2	Justin Westhoff	Port Adelaide	71%	Greater Western Sydney	AAMI Stadium
3	Matthew Broadbent	Port Adelaide		Adelaide	AAMI Stadium
3	Shane Edwards	Richmond		Western Bulldogs	Etihad Stadium
3	Jeremy Howe	Melbourne	78%	West Coast	MCG
4	Jack Riewoldt	Richmond		Collingwood	MCG
4	Jay Schulz	Port Adelaide		Gold Coast	Metricon Stadium
4	Jeremy Howe	Melbourne	57%	Greater Western Sydney	MCG
5	Jeff Garlett	Carlton	56%	Adelaide	MCG
5	Jarryd Blair	Collingwood		Essendon	MCG
5	Liam Jones	Western Bulldogs		Geelong	Etihad Stadium
6	Liam Jones	Western Bulldogs	49%	West Coast	Patersons Stadium
6	Andy Otten	Adelaide		Hawthorn	AAMI Stadium
6	Zac Smith	Gold Coast		Fremantle	Metricon Stadium
7	Liam Jones	Western Bulldogs	52%	West Coast	Etihad Stadium
7	Patrick Dangerfield	Adelaide		Greater Western Sydney	Škoda Stadium
7	Josh Jenkins	Adelaide		Greater Western Sydney	Škoda Stadium
8	Nic Naitanui	West Coast	59%	North Melbourne	Patersons Stadium
8	Jeremy Howe	Melbourne		Richmond	MCG
8	Sam Reid	Sydney		Fremantle	SCG
9	Chad Wingard	Port Adelaide	45%	Geelong	AAMI Stadium
9	Brent Moloney	Brisbane Lions		Carlton	Gabba
9	Jack Riewoldt	Richmond		Essendon	MCG
10	Drew Petrie	North Melbourne		St Kilda	Etihad Stadium
10	Jarryd Roughead	Hawthorn	46%	Melbourne	MCG
10	Tim Sumner	Gold Coast		Geelong	Simonds Stadium
11	Paddy Ryder	Essendon		Carlton	MCG
11	Jake Carlisle	Essendon		Carlton	MCG
11	Stephen Milne	St Kilda	51%	West Coast	Etihad Stadium
12	Heath Shaw	Collingwood		Western Bulldogs	Etihad Stadium
12	Heath Hocking	Essendon		Gold Coast	Etihad Stadium
12	Levi Casboult	Carlton	39%	Hawthorn	MCG
13	Ty Vickery	Richmond		Western Bulldogs	Etihad Stadium
13	Nat Fyfe	Fremantle	52%	North Melbourne	Patersons Stadium
13	Jimmy Bartel	Geelong		Brisbane Lions	Gabba
14	Jamie Elliott	Collingwood	71%	Port Adelaide	AAMI Stadium
14	Jeremy Howe	Melbourne		Western Bulldogs	MCG
14	Nic Naitanui	West Coast		Essendon	Patersons Stadium
15	Tom Bellchambers	Essendon	71%	Port Adelaide	Etihad Stadium
15	Michael Jamison	Carlton		Collingwood	MCG
15	Dean Terlich	Melbourne		Sydney	MCG
16	Tendai Mzungu	Fremantle		West Coast	Patersons Stadium
16	Travis Cloke	Collingwood	57%	Adelaide	MCG
16	Chris Mayne	Fremantle		West Coast	Patersons Stadium
17	Jamie Elliott	Collingwood	64%	Gold Coast	Metricon Stadium
17	Justin Westhoff	Port Adelaide		St Kilda	Etihad Stadium
17	Jimmy Bartel	Geelong		Adelaide	AAMI Stadium
18	James Podsiadly	Geelong		St Kilda	Simonds Stadium
18	James Podsiadly	Geelong	63%	St Kilda	Simonds Stadium
18	Kurt Tippett	Sydney		Richmond	SCG
19	Cory Dell'Olio	Essendon		Collingwood	MCG
19	Josh Hill	West Coast		Gold Coast	Patersons Stadium
19	Luke Delaney	North Melbourne	49%	Geelong	Etihad Stadium
20	Luke Breust	Hawthorn	68%	St Kilda	Etihad Stadium
20	Luke McGuane	Richmond		Brisbane Lions	MCG
20	Michael Hibberd	Essendon		West Coast	Etihad Stadium
21	Lachie Hunter	Western Bulldogs		Adelaide	Etihad Stadium
21	Kyle Hardingham	Essendon		North Melbourne	Etihad Stadium
21	Zac Clarke	Fremantle	59%	Melbourne	MCG
22	Steven Motlop	Geelong	79%	Sydney	Simonds Stadium
22	Jarrad Waite	Carlton		Essendon	MCG
22	James Podsiadly	Geelong		Sydney	Simonds Stadium
23	Jeremy Howe	Melbourne	72%	Western Bulldogs	Etihad Stadium
23	Elliot Yeo	Brisbane Lions		Geelong	Simonds Stadium
23	Brent Renouf	Port Adelaide		Carlton	AAMI Stadium

== 2013 Finalists ==
Round	Nominees	Team	Opposition	Ground	Description
1	Jay Schulz	Port Adelaide	Melbourne	MCG	Jay Schulz flies high to take a hanger
8	Nic Naitanui	West Coast	North Melbourne	Paterson's Stadium	Naitanui speccy at the death
14	Jamie Elliott	Collingwood	Port Adelaide	AAMI Stadium	Elliott's poetry in motion

== See also ==
- Mark of the Year
- Goal of the Year
- 2013 AFL Goal of the Year
- 2013 AFL season
