= Matthew Scharenberg =

Australian rules footballer (born 1995)

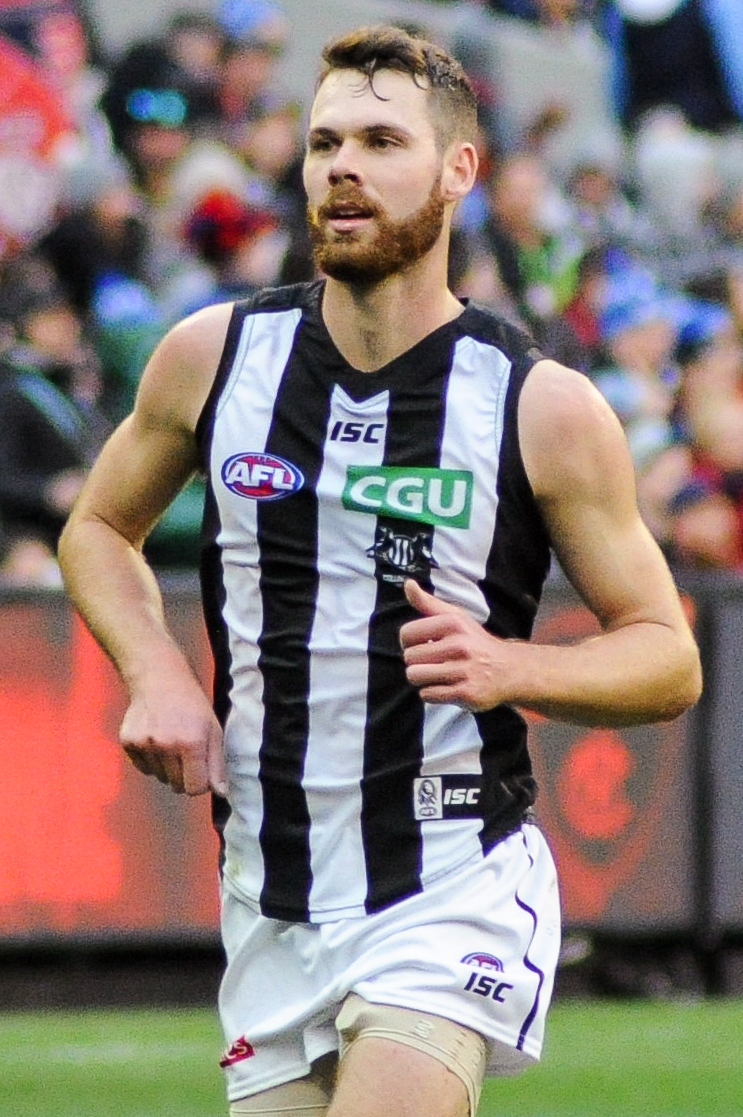
- Scharenberg playing for Collingwood in June 2017

Personal information
- Full name: Matthew Scharenberg
- Nickname: Shaz
- Born: 18 September 1995 (age 31); Adelaide, South Australia
- Original team: Glenelg (SANFL)
- Draft: No. 6, 2013 AFL draft, Collingwood
- Debut: Round 18, 2015, Collingwood vs. Melbourne, at MCG
- Height: 191 cm (6 ft 3 in)
- Weight: 87 kg (192 lb)
- Position: Defender

Playing career^{1}
Years	Club	Games (Goals)
2014–2020	Collingwood	41 (0)
- ^{1} Playing statistics correct to the end of the 2020 season.

Matthew Scharenberg (born 18 September 1995) is a professional Australian rules football player who last played for the Collingwood Football Club in the Australian Football League (AFL).

== State football ==
Scharenberg played for amateur club PHOS Camden and for his school Immanuel College. He played state football at Glenelg, performing at a level which had him highly touted for the draft despite feet problems. Scharenberg represented South Australia in the AFL Under 18 Championships and was selected for the All-Australian team in the 2012 season and in the 2013 season. In 2013 he also was judged the most valuable player for South Australia, together with Luke Dunstan. During the Championships he averaged 22 disposals per game.

== AFL career ==
Scharenberg was recruited by Collingwood with the sixth selection in the 2013 AFL draft. He was touted by Mark Williams as the best schoolboy prospect since Wayne Carey. Following a knee reconstruction, Scharenberg made his AFL debut in round 18 of the 2015 season, against Melbourne at the MCG as a late inclusion for Tyson Goldsack. A month after his debut, at the end of the 2015 season, he was signed by Collingwood to a three-year contract extension. In November 2015, Scharenberg tore the anterior cruciate ligament in his right knee during training, only nine months after recovering from the same injury. Despite the setback and disappointment, he didn't stop believing in himself and didn't lose his passion for the game. Scharenberg returned to playing during the 2017 season, playing 10 games at the end of the season. In the 2018 season, he averaged 21 disposals, six marks and 3.5 rebound 50s in his first 11 games of the season, leading to him being re-signed by the club to a two-year contract extension. In round 19 which Collingwood lost to Richmond by 28 points, Scharenberg suffered his third anterior cruciate ligament injury. He returned to playing after another knee reconstruction through the Victorian Football League (VFL), averaging 22.3 disposals and seven marks in his first three games back.

Scharenberg was delisted by Collingwood at the conclusion of the 2020 season.

== Return to state football ==
In early 2021, Scharenberg signed on to play for Olinda-Ferny Creek Football Club in the Outer East Football League for the 2021 season.

== Personal life ==
Scharenberg grew up in Adelaide, with his older brother Jake Scharenberg who plays for amateur club PHOS Camden and his younger brother Jonty Scharenberg who plays for Glenelg. Before choosing to concentrate exclusively on Australian rules football, Scharenberg played junior level baseball, representing Australia.

== Statistics ==
Statistics are correct to the end of the 2020 season

Legend
G	Goals	K	Kicks	D	Disposals	T	Tackles
B	Behinds	H	Handballs	M	Marks

Season	Team	No.	Games	Totals							Averages (per game)						
Season	Team	No.	Games	G	B	K	H	D	M	T	G	B	K	H	D	M	T
2014	Collingwood	35	0	—	—	—	—	—	—	—	—	—	—	—	—	—	—
2015	Collingwood	12	4	0	1	33	27	60	18	5	0.0	0.3	8.3	6.8	15.0	4.5	1.3
2016	Collingwood	12	0	—	—	—	—	—	—	—	—	—	—	—	—	—	—
2017	Collingwood	12	10	0	0	125	77	202	75	9	0.0	0.0	12.5	7.7	20.2	7.5	0.9
2018	Collingwood	12	17	0	0	170	165	335	106	29	0.0	0.0	10.0	9.7	19.7	6.2	1.7
2019	Collingwood	12	7	0	0	55	48	103	32	7	0.0	0.0	7.9	6.9	14.7	4.6	1.0
2020	Collingwood	12	3	0	0	25	15	40	12	8	0.0	0.0	8.3	5.0	13.3	4.0	2.7
Career			41	0	1	408	332	740	243	58	0.0	0.03	10.0	8.1	18.0	5.9	1.4
