= 2013 NAB Cup =

- Season: 2013
- Teams: 18
- Winners: Brisbane Lions (1st title)
- Matches played: 43
- Attendance: 418,095 (average 9,723 per match)
- Michael Tuck Medallist: Daniel Rich (Brisbane)

The 2013 NAB Cup was an Australian Football League (AFL) pre-season competition that was played before the 2013 home and away season. The tournament commenced on 15 February 2013, and concluded with the NAB Cup Grand Final on 15 March 2013. The first group of matches was played between Collingwood, Essendon and Western Bulldogs in Melbourne at Etihad Stadium. The tournament was won by the Brisbane Lions, its first pre-season premiership.

The competition format was the same as the previous year and once again featured eighteen teams. Matches were played at both regular AFL venues and select regional centres. All matches in the first three rounds of the competition counted equally with four points for a win and percentage also being taken into account. The two best-performed teams, the Brisbane Lions and Carlton, played the NAB Cup Grand Final on 15 March. Teams not playing in the first week of Round 1 of the 2013 AFL season played one last pre-season match at various metropolitan locations across Australia in week 5.

The format for the 2013 NAB Cup was as follows:

- Weeks 1 and 2: The eighteen teams were split into six pools of three teams each. The three teams in each pool played each other in games of two 20-minute halves, with all three games being played over a three-hour period at the one venue.
- Weeks 3 and 4: The eighteen teams played full length matches each week in either metropolitan or regional areas.
- Week 5: The two best ranked teams played in the NAB Cup Grand Final. Teams not playing in the first week of Round 1 of the 2013 AFL season played a full length match in either metropolitan or regional areas.

== Games ==
The fixtures were announced by the AFL on 24 October 2012. All times listed are local times.

=== Round 1 ===
	Pool 1
Friday, 15 February (6:45 pm)	Essendon 1.5.6 (45)	def.	Western Bulldogs 1.1.4 (19)	Etihad Stadium (crowd: 24,817)	Report
Friday, 15 February (7:50 pm)	Western Bulldogs 0.4.5 (29)	def. by	Collingwood 1.6.2 (47)	Etihad Stadium (crowd: 26,693)	Report
Friday, 15 February (8:55 pm)	Collingwood 1.2.10 (31)	def.	Essendon 0.4.5 (29)	Etihad Stadium (crowd: 26,921)	Report

	Pool 2
Saturday, 16 February (4:40 pm)	West Coast 1.6.2 (47)	def. by	Geelong 1.6.4 (49)	Patersons Stadium (crowd: 20,485)	Report
Saturday, 16 February (5:45 pm)	Fremantle 0.7.6 (48)	def.	Geelong 0.4.6 (30)	Patersons Stadium (crowd: 21,804)	Report
Saturday, 16 February (6:50 pm)	West Coast 1.4.7 (40)	def.	Fremantle 0.2.4 (16)	Patersons Stadium (crowd: 21,935)	Report

	Pool 3
Sunday, 17 February (4:10 pm)	Adelaide 0.3.6 (24)	def. by	St Kilda 0.8.2 (50)	AAMI Stadium (crowd: 8,966)	Report
Sunday, 17 February (5:15 pm)	Port Adelaide 1.9.2 (65)	def.	St Kilda 0.2.3 (15)	AAMI Stadium (crowd: 8,966)	Report
Sunday, 17 February (6:20 pm)	Adelaide 0.6.7 (43)	def.	Port Adelaide 0.4.3 (27)	AAMI Stadium (crowd: 8,966)	Report

	Pool 4
Friday, 22 February (6:45 pm)	North Melbourne 1.4.5 (38)	def.	Melbourne 0.5.6 (36)	Etihad Stadium (crowd: 20,309)	Report
Friday, 22 February (7:50 pm)	Melbourne 0.2.3 (15)	def. by	Richmond 1.2.9 (30)	Etihad Stadium (crowd: 20,309)	Report
Friday, 22 February (8:55 pm)	Richmond 0.6.8 (44)	def. by	North Melbourne 0.7.6 (48)	Etihad Stadium (crowd: 20,309)	Report

	Pool 5
Saturday, 23 February (6:40 pm)	Gold Coast 0.4.6 (30)	def.	Hawthorn 0.4.5 (29)	Metricon Stadium (crowd: 7,847)	Report
Saturday, 23 February (7:45 pm)	Brisbane Lions 0.4.8 (32)	def.	Hawthorn 0.1.5 (11)	Metricon Stadium (crowd: 7,847)	Report
Saturday, 23 February (8:50 pm)	Gold Coast 0.3.6 (24)	def. by	Brisbane Lions 2.6.3 (57)	Metricon Stadium (crowd: 7,847)	Report

	Pool 6
Sunday, 24 February (4:40 pm)	Greater Western Sydney 0.5.2 (32)	def. by	Carlton 0.4.10 (34)	Blacktown International Sportspark (crowd: 4,078)	Report
Sunday, 24 February (5:45 pm)	Sydney 0.3.6 (24)	def. by	Carlton 1.5.7 (46)	Blacktown International Sportspark (crowd: 4,078)	Report
Sunday, 24 February (6:50 pm)	Greater Western Sydney 0.7.10 (52)	def.	Sydney 1.3.1 (28)	Blacktown International Sportspark (crowd: 4,078)	Report

=== Round 2 ===
	Round 2
Friday, 1 March (7:40 pm)	Western Bulldogs 1.10.6 (75)	def.	Hawthorn 2.8.8 (74)	Etihad Stadium (crowd: 8,162)	Report
Saturday, 2 March (2:40 pm)	Geelong 2.16.12 (126)	def.	Adelaide 1.8.6 (63)	Simonds Stadium (crowd: 5,000)	Report
Saturday, 2 March (3:30 pm)	Gold Coast 1.11.14 (89)	def. by	North Melbourne 2.13.6 (102)	Tony Ireland Stadium, Townsville (crowd: 7,216)	Report
Saturday, 2 March (5:10 pm)	Essendon 1.10.9 (78)	def. by	Richmond 2.8.20 (86)	Wangaratta Showgrounds (crowd: 7,884)	Report
Saturday, 2 March (7:00 pm)	Greater Western Sydney 2.12.7 (97)	def. by	Brisbane Lions 1.12.19 (100)	Robertson Oval, Wagga Wagga (crowd: 7,068)	Report
Saturday, 2 March (7:40 pm)	Carlton 0.18.16 (124)	def.	Fremantle 1.6.9 (54)	Etihad Stadium (crowd: 9,402)	Report
Sunday, 3 March (4:00 pm)	Port Adelaide 1.10.7 (76)	def. by	Melbourne 0.12.6 (78)	Renmark Oval, Renmark, South Australia (crowd: 3,764)	Report
Sunday, 3 March (5:10 pm)	St Kilda 0.13.12 (90)	def.	Sydney 1.8.10 (67)	Etihad Stadium (crowd: 6,656)	Report
Sunday, 3 March (4:40 pm)	West Coast 1.10.7 (76)	def. by	Collingwood 3.10.9 (96)	Patersons Stadium (crowd: 14,237)	Report

=== Round 3 ===
	Round 3
Friday, 8 March (6:10 pm)	Greater Western Sydney 0.4.4 (28)	def. by	Essendon 1.16.14 (119)	Manuka Oval (crowd: 8,044)	Report
Friday, 8 March (8:10 pm)	Adelaide 4.11.7 (109)	def.	Carlton 2.13.10 (106)	AAMI Stadium (crowd: 7,511)	Report
Saturday, 9 March (1:10 pm)	Hawthorn 0.13.6 (84)	def. by	Richmond 0.13.7 (85)	Aurora Stadium (crowd: 8,601)	Report
Saturday, 9 March (2:30 pm)	Melbourne 2.7.6 (66)	def. by	St Kilda 2.10.13 (91)	Casey Fields, Cranbourne (crowd: 5,000)	Report
Saturday, 9 March (3:40 pm)	Geelong 0.14.12 (96)	def.	North Melbourne 0.12.12 (84)	Simonds Stadium	Report
Saturday, 9 March (3:30 pm)	Fremantle 0.23.8 (146)	def.	Western Bulldogs 0.5.7 (37)	Bendigo Bank Stadium, Mandurah (crowd: 5,032)	Report
Saturday, 9 March (6:40 pm)	Collingwood 0.7.12 (54)	def. by	Brisbane Lions 0.12.16 (88)	Etihad Stadium (crowd: 12,093)	Report
Saturday, 9 March (7:00 pm)	Sydney 0.11.14 (80)	def.	Gold Coast 0.6.8 (44)	Blacktown International Sportspark	Report
Saturday, 9 March (7:00 pm)	West Coast 1.11.11 (86)	def. by	Port Adelaide 1.13.5 (92)	Traeger Park, Alice Springs (crowd: 4,244)	Report

=== Grand Final ===
2013 NAB Cup Grand Final
Friday, 15 March (7:45 pm)	Carlton	def. by	Brisbane Lions	Etihad Stadium (crowd: 24,884)	Report
1.2.0 (21); 2.6.6 (60); 2.7.7 (67); 2.7.9 (69)	Q1; Q2; Q3; Final	0.5.3 (33); 0.7.5 (47); 0.12.10 (82); 0.16.13 (109)	Umpires: Bannister, Margetts, Jeffery; Michael Tuck Medal: Daniel Rich; Television broadcast: Seven Network/Fox Footy
Bryce Gibbs, Zach Tuohy	Super Goals	N/A
Betts, Casboult, Duigan, Kreuzer, Robinson, Rowe, White	Goals	Brown 5, Green 3, Zorko 2, Bewick, Karnezis, McGrath, Polkinghorne, Redden, Rich
Gibbs, Simpson, Yarran, Kreuzer, Murphy	Best	Rich, Zorko, Hanley, Brown, Karnezis, Moloney, Merrett, Green
N/A	Injuries	N/A
N/A	Reports	N/A
Due to the unavailability of the Gabba because of cricket commitments, the AFL chose to schedule the match at Etihad Stadium rather than Metricon Stadium in Queensland, citing that the largest possible crowd would be drawn in Melbourne ahead of any potential game on the Gold Coast.; This was the last pre-season tournament to award a Michael Tuck Medal, as the subsequent pre-season tournaments no longer had grand finals or a specified winner

== NAB Challenge ==
	NAB Challenge
Friday, 15 March (4:00 pm)	Geelong 20.21 (141)	def.	Collingwood 13.12 (90)	Simonds Stadium	Report
Saturday, 16 March (11:30 am)	Gold Coast 12.8 (80)	def.	Melbourne 8.7 (55)	Fankhauser Reserve, Southport	Report
Saturday, 16 March (1:00 pm)	Port Adelaide 15.12 (102)	def.	Sydney 10.12 (72)	AAMI Stadium (crowd: 5,042)	Report
Saturday, 16 March (2:00 pm)	North Melbourne 5.11 (41)	def. by	Hawthorn 19.8 (122)	Highgate Recreation Reserve, Craigieburn	Report
Saturday, 16 March (2:00 pm)	Richmond 14.8 (92)	def.	Western Bulldogs 12.11 (83)	Visy Park (crowd: 2,000)	Report
Saturday, 16 March (2:00 pm)	Greater Western Sydney 16.6 (102)	def.	St Kilda 12.14 (86)	Blacktown International Sportspark	Report
Adelaide, Essendon, West Coast and Fremantle did not play this round due to their earlier round one commitments.; These matches, played on the same weekend as the Grand Final, were not counted towards the NAB Cup ladder.; All matches played in this round are conducted under normal AFL Premiership season rules.

== Ladder ==
2013 NAB Cup Ladder
Pos	Team	Pld	W	L	D	PF	PA	PP	Pts	
1	Brisbane Lions	4	4	0	0	277	186	148.9	16	Grand Final
2	Carlton	4	3	1	0	310	219	141.6	12	Grand Final
3	Geelong	4	3	1	0	301	242	124.4	12	
4	St Kilda	4	3	1	0	246	222	110.8	12	
5	Richmond	4	3	1	0	245	225	108.9	12	
6	Collingwood	4	3	1	0	228	222	102.7	12	
7	North Melbourne	4	3	1	0	272	265	102.6	12	
8	Essendon	4	2	2	0	271	164	165.2	8	
9	Port Adelaide	4	2	2	0	260	222	117.1	8	
10	Fremantle	4	2	2	0	264	231	114.3	8	
11	Adelaide	4	2	2	0	239	309	77.3	8	
12	West Coast	4	1	3	0	249	253	98.4	4	
13	Sydney	4	1	3	0	199	232	85.8	4	
14	Melbourne	4	1	3	0	195	235	83.0	4	
15	Greater Western Sydney	4	1	3	0	209	281	74.4	4	
16	Gold Coast	4	1	3	0	187	268	69.8	4	
17	Western Bulldogs	4	1	3	0	160	312	51.3	4	
18	Hawthorn	4	0	4	0	198	222	89.2	0	

Source: NAB Cup AFL Ladder
Rules for classification: 1) points; 2) percentage; 3) number of points for.

== See also ==
- 2013 AFL season
