= Kyle Martin (footballer) =

Australian rules football player (born 1990)

Personal information
- Full name: Kyle Martin
- Nickname: Marty
- Born: 17 September 1990 (age 36)
- Original team: Frankston (VFL) / Noble Park
- Draft: No. 13, 2013 Rookie Draft, Collingwood
- Height: 180 cm (5 ft 11 in)
- Weight: 77 kg (170 lb)
- Position: Midfielder

Playing career
Years	Club	Games (Goals)
2013–2014	Collingwood	6 (7)

Career highlights
- Joseph Wren Memorial Trophy 2013, 2014

Kyle Martin (born 17 September 1990) is an Australian rules football player who was recruited by the Collingwood Football Club of the Australian Football League (AFL) with draft pick #13 in the 2013 Rookie Draft after winning the 2012 best and fairest award for Frankston in the Victorian Football League (VFL). He made his AFL debut in Round 10, 2013, against Brisbane Lions at the Gabba.

Martin embarked on a decorated local football career after returning to his home club of Noble Park in 2015, where he won the best and fairest award in every season from 2015 to 2022. His career tally of best and fairest awards stands at 13 in his 14 completed seasons of football.

== Football career ==
=== School football (2008) ===
While studying at Haileybury College, Martin won the best and fairest award for the school's boys football team.

=== Local football and VFL; numerous awards (2009–2012) ===
In 2009, at the age of 19, Martin caught the attention of recruiters following a breakout year playing in Melbourne's Eastern Football League for the Noble Park Football Club where he won the club's best and fairest award. Martin spent a further two seasons at Noble Park, winning the best and fairest again in 2011, before joining Frankston in 2012, where he went on to win the club champion trophy in his first season.

=== Drafted to Collingwood; the streak continues (2013–2014) ===
In his first season at Collingwood, Martin played 4 senior games, scoring 6 goals, and also won the Joseph Wren Memorial Trophy as the best and fairest of Collingwood's VFL side. He repeated the feat in 2014, claiming a second consecutive Joseph Wren award after managing just two games for the senior side that season.

On 4 October 2014, Martin announced his departure from Collingwood and the AFL to return to the Noble Park Football Club in 2015 after deciding the full-time demands of professional sport were not for him.

=== Return to local football; more awards (2015–2021) ===
Martin resumed his occupation as a plumber and rejoined Noble Park in 2015, where he immediately stamped his authority by winning the club's best and fairest award, the Peter Reece Medal. Martin repeated the dose the following season, and continued to go on a remarkable streak that saw him win Noble Park's best and fairest for seven consecutive seasons from 2015 to 2022 (excluding the 2020 season which was cancelled due to the COVID-19 pandemic).

=== Premiership success; an unrivalled record (2022) ===
Martin's most recent honours at Noble Park came during the club's upset premiership victory in 2022 over minor premier Rowville. His award capped an incomparable record of 13 best and fairest awards in 14 completed seasons of football, with the feat's consecutive streak upset only by a broken leg in 2010 and the cancelled pandemic season of 2020. The swathe of medals and trophies saw him deified in the media as being "commonly regarded as the best player in Victorian local football".

=== Season-ending injury; impending return (2023–) ===
Martin's hopes for a tenth Peter Reece Medal in 2023 were dashed when he suffered a season-ending anterior cruciate ligament injury at pre-season training; he became an assistant coach at Noble Park for the season instead. Martin was tipped by coach Steve Hughes to sit out the first two months of the 2024 season, with the 33-year-old to return in the back half of the year.
