= Sam Dwyer =

Australian rules footballer

Personal information
- Full name: Sam Dwyer
- Born: 29 August 1986 (age 40)
- Original team: Port Melbourne (VFL)
- Draft: No. 27, 2013 Rookie Draft, Collingwood
- Height: 180 cm (5 ft 11 in)
- Weight: 76 kg (168 lb)
- Position: Midfielder / Small Forward

Playing career^{1}
Years	Club	Games (Goals)
2013–2015	Collingwood	39 (22)
- ^{1} Playing statistics correct to the end of 2015.

Career highlights
- VFL premiership player: 2017

Sam Dwyer (born 29 August 1986) is a professional Australian rules footballer who plays for Port Melbourne. He played for the Collingwood Football Club in the Australian Football League (AFL). He was recruited by the club with draft pick #27 in the 2013 Rookie Draft after performing well for Port Melbourne in the Victorian Football League (VFL). He made his debut in Round 1, 2013, against North Melbourne at Docklands Stadium.

Dwyer was lauded for his performance in his second AFL game against Carlton, collecting 23 disposals and kicking one goal.

In his eighth AFL appearance, Dwyer amassed 27 disposals and three goals in a 6-point upset win against the previously undefeated Geelong. Dwyer played only 5 games in 2015 and was delisted after 39 games and 22 goals

Following his delistment from Collingwood, Dwyer returned to Port Melbourne.

== Statistics ==
Legend
G	Goals	K	Kicks	D	Disposals	T	Tackles
B	Behinds	H	Handballs	M	Marks

Season	Team	No.	Games	Totals							Averages (per game)						
Season	Team	No.	Games	G	B	K	H	D	M	T	G	B	K	H	D	M	T
2013	Collingwood	41	21	15	9	174	174	348	82	36	0.7	0.4	8.3	8.3	16.6	3.9	1.7
2014	Collingwood	2	13	3	4	105	109	214	54	16	0.2	0.3	8.1	8.4	16.5	4.2	1.2
2015	Collingwood	2	5	4	2	30	24	54	14	7	0.8	0.4	6.0	4.8	10.8	2.8	1.4
Career			39	22	15	309	307	616	150	59	0.56	0.38	7.92	7.87	15.79	3.85	1.51
