= Jonathon Marsh =

Australian rules footballer

Personal information
- Full name: Jonathon Marsh
- Born: 17 October 1995 (age 31)
- Original team: East Fremantle (WAFL)
- Draft: No. 77, 2013 AFL draft, Collingwood
- Height: 193 cm (6 ft 4 in)
- Weight: 87 kg (192 lb)
- Position: Defender

Club information
- Current club: East Fremantle
- Number: 10

Playing career^{1}
Years	Club	Games (Goals)
2014–2016	Collingwood	15 (0)
2017–18, 2021–	East Fremantle	83 (118)
2019–2020	St Kilda	11 (3)
Total		26 (3)
- ^{1} Playing statistics correct to the end of round 12, 2024.

Jonathon Marsh (born 17 October 1995) is a professional Australian rules footballer who plays for East Fremantle in the West Australian Football League (WAFL). He previously played for Collingwood from 2014 to 2016 and St Kilda from 2019 to 2020 in the Australian Football League (AFL).

Marsh played his junior football with the Augusta-Margaret River Hawks, often with older brother Harry, of the Sydney Swans, and he went to school in Margaret River and Busselton. He was recruited by the club with the 77th selection in the 2013 AFL draft. Marsh was a late pick, drafted for his attack on the ball and defensive attributes. He made his debut in round 19, 2015 against Carlton. In November 2016, he announced his retirement from AFL football to return to his home state of Western Australia. He was signed as a rookie by St Kilda for the 2019 AFL season during the supplemental selection period (SSP). He returned to WA to play for East Fremantle again in 2021.

== Statistics ==
Legend
G	Goals	K	Kicks	D	Disposals	T	Tackles
B	Behinds	H	Handballs	M	Marks

Season	Team	No.	Games	Totals							Averages (per game)						
Season	Team	No.	Games	G	B	K	H	D	M	T	G	B	K	H	D	M	T
2014	Collingwood	46	0	—	—	—	—	—	—	—	—	—	—	—	—	—	—
2015	Collingwood	17	5	0	0	26	25	51	10	9	0.0	0.0	5.2	5.0	10.2	2.0	1.8
2016	Collingwood	17	10	0	1	83	41	124	44	30	0.0	0.1	8.3	4.1	12.4	4.4	3.0
2019	St Kilda	43	5	1	1	29	12	41	15	11	0.2	0.2	5.8	2.4	8.2	3.0	2.2
Career			20	1	2	138	78	216	69	50	0.1	0.1	6.9	3.9	10.8	3.5	2.5
