= Corey Gault =

Australian rules footballer

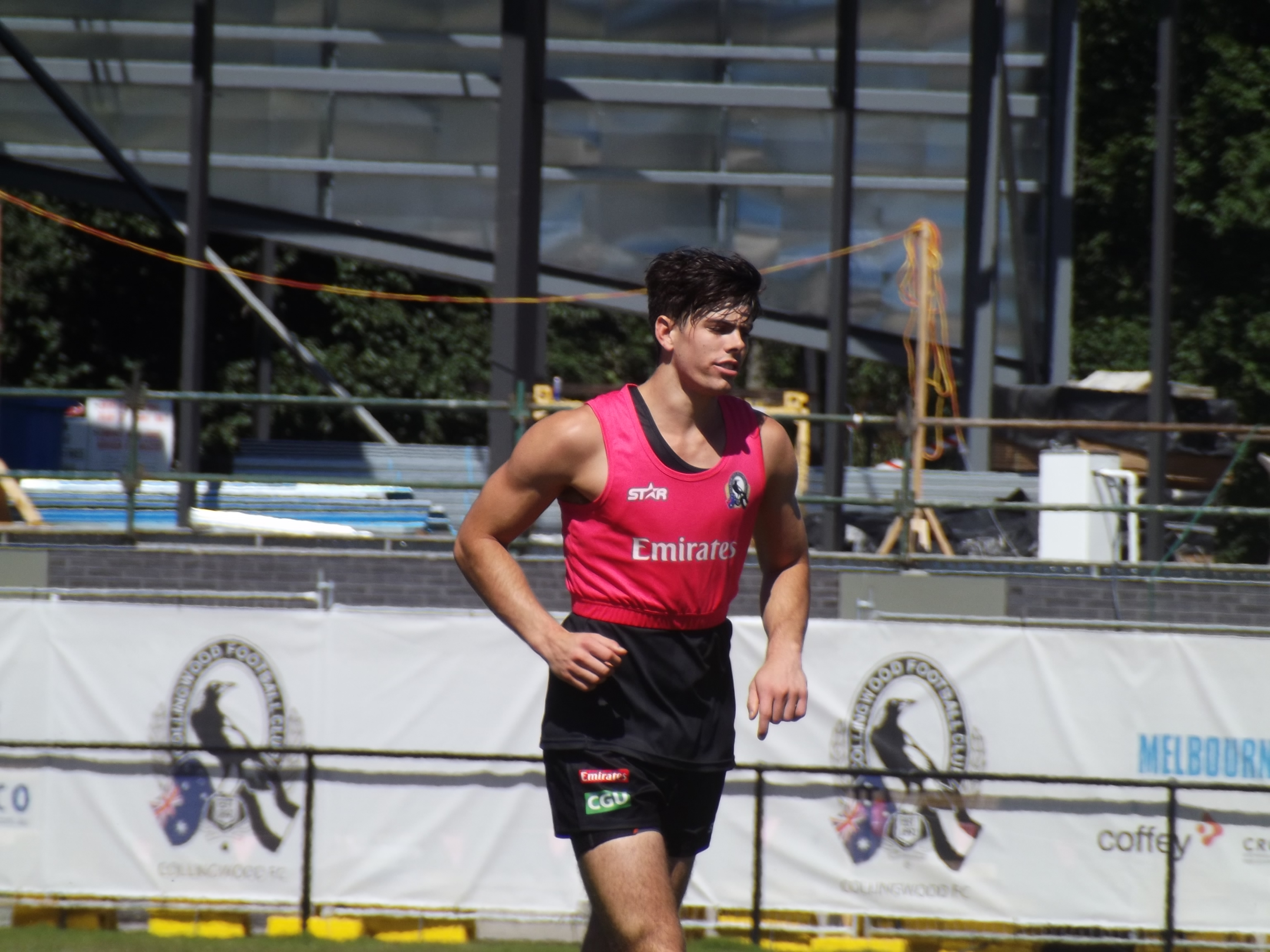
- Gault training with Collingwood in 2014

Personal information
- Full name: Corey Gault
- Born: 28 October 1992 (age 34)
- Original team: Swan Districts (WAFL)
- Draft: No. 65, 2011 national draft
- Height: 199 cm (6 ft 6 in)
- Weight: 96 kg (212 lb)
- Position: Forward

Playing career^{1}
Years	Club	Games (Goals)
2012–2016	Collingwood	6 (4)
- ^{1} Playing statistics correct to the end of 2016.

Corey Gault (born 28 October 1992) is a former professional Australian rules footballer who played for the Collingwood Football Club in the Australian Football League (AFL).

He made his debut for Collingwood against Hawthorn in round 23 of the 2014 AFL season. Gault was delisted at the end of 2013 season but was given another chance and re-drafted to the rookie list via the 2014 AFL Rookie Draft. Standing at 199 cm and 96 kg Gault is a tall forward.

In October 2016, Gault retired from AFL level football to return home to Western Australia and re-joined Swan Districts. He represented Western Australia in the interstate match against South Australia in 2021.

== Statistics ==
Legend
G	Goals	K	Kicks	D	Disposals	T	Tackles
B	Behinds	H	Handballs	M	Marks

Season	Team	No.	Games	Totals							Averages (per game)						
Season	Team	No.	Games	G	B	K	H	D	M	T	G	B	K	H	D	M	T
2012	Collingwood	44	0	—	—	—	—	—	—	—	—	—	—	—	—	—	—
2013	Collingwood	44	0	—	—	—	—	—	—	—	—	—	—	—	—	—	—
2014	Collingwood	44	1	2	0	6	1	7	3	4	2.0	0.0	6.0	1.0	7.0	3.0	4.0
2015	Collingwood	44	3	2	1	13	13	26	5	5	0.7	0.3	4.3	4.3	8.7	1.7	1.7
2016	Collingwood	44	2	0	0	6	5	11	2	6	0.0	0.0	3.0	2.5	5.5	1.0	3.0
Career			6	4	1	25	19	44	10	15	0.7	0.2	4.2	3.2	7.3	1.7	2.5

== Post-playing career ==
Whilst injured and unable to play AFL, Corey started a teaching degree which he completed in around 2018, and also moved back to Perth. He then got a job teaching at Eastern Hills Senior High School where he was from 2019 until 2023, when he applied for a job at Guildford Grammar School which was successful.
