= Peter Yagmoor =

Australian rules footballer

Personal information
- Full name: Peter Yagmoor
- Born: 20 October 1993 (age 33)
- Original team: Morningside (NEAFL)
- Draft: QLD zone selection, Gold Coast; Traded for pick 47, Collingwood
- Height: 180 cm (5 ft 11 in)
- Weight: 82 kg (181 lb)
- Positions: Defender, midfielder

Playing career^{1}
Years	Club	Games (Goals)
2012–2014	Collingwood	2 (0)
- ^{1} Playing statistics correct to the end of 2014.

Peter Yagmoor (born 20 October 1993) is a former Australian rules football player.

== Early life ==
Yagmoor was born in Cairns, and raised in Cairns and Alice Springs. His father is Lebanese and his mother is Indigenous Australian. He played his junior football with Cairns City Cobras and North Cairns in the AFL Cairns competition before moving to Brisbane where he played with the Kenmore Bears before playing senior football with Morningside in the Queensland Australian Football League.

He was recruited by Gold Coast in 2011 with their Queensland zone selection concessions, before being traded onto Collingwood, in conjunction with national draft pick 50, for pick 47.

== AFL career ==
Yagmoor made his debut in round 1, against Hawthorn. He managed two tackles but did not gather a single disposal. He was dropped but earned a recall against Brisbane Lions in round 7, where he gathered 11 disposals but was dropped again the next week.

Yagmoor was delisted by Collingwood at the end of the 2014 season, having played two senior games for the club.
