= Jack Frost (footballer, born 1992) =

Australian rules footballer

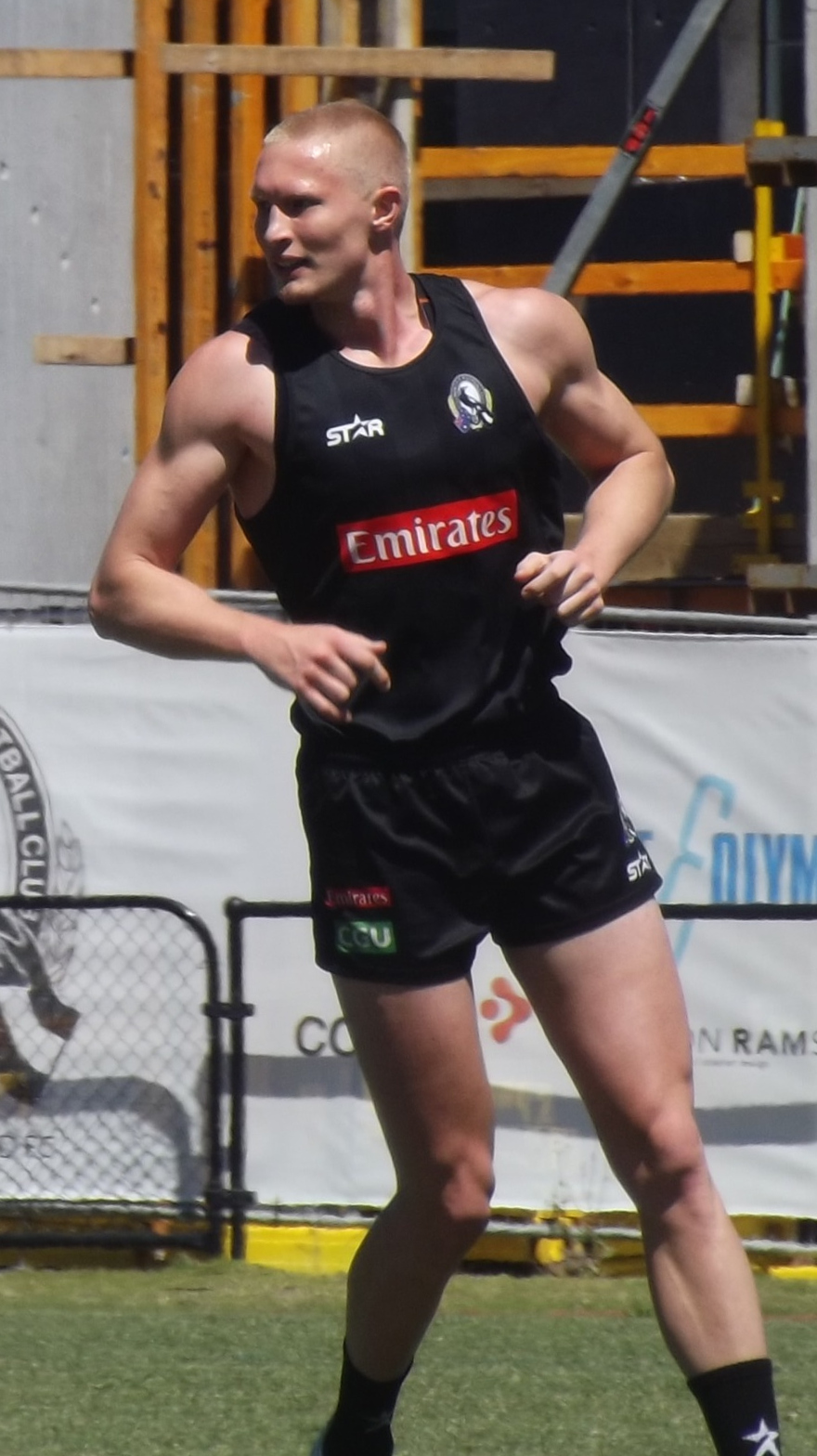
- Frost training with Collingwood in 2014

Personal information
- Full name: Jack Frost
- Born: 25 February 1992 (age 34)
- Original team: Williamstown (VFL)
- Draft: No. 41, 2013 rookie draft
- Height: 195 cm (6 ft 5 in)
- Weight: 90 kg (198 lb)
- Position: Defender

Playing career
Years	Club	Games (Goals)
2013–2016	Collingwood	54 (0)
2017–2018	Brisbane Lions	2 (0)
Total		56 (0)

Jack Frost (born 25 February 1992) is a former professional Australian rules footballer who played for the Collingwood Football Club and Brisbane Lions in the Australian Football League (AFL).

== AFL career ==
=== Collingwood ===
He was recruited by Collingwood with forty-first selection in the 2013 rookie draft after playing 10 games with Williamstown in 2011 & 2012, including the 2011 VFL grand final which the VFL Seagulls lost to Port Melbourne. Frost was awarded the best in finals player trophy for Williamstown in 2012. He made his AFL debut in round 1, 2013, against North Melbourne at Etihad Stadium.

Frost played 54 games for Collingwood, but only 10 in the 2016 season as he wasn't a consistent starter.

=== Brisbane Lions ===
After being out of contract with Collingwood at the conclusion of the 2016 season, he nominated the Brisbane Lions as his preferred new club. He was officially traded to Brisbane in October.

Frost played two games for Brisbane before suffering concussion. The persistence of ongoing symptoms over the past two years were a concern to Frost, his family and the Club. At the end of the 2018 season, concussion symptoms forced him to retire. Frost suffered 14 concussions in his six-year AFL career at Brisbane and Collingwood.

== Post AFL ==
Frost is currently coach of Hawthorn's AFL Wheelchair and AFL Blind teams.

== Family ==
His father, David Frost, played thirty-four matches for the Glenelg Football Club and seventy-two matches for the Sturt Football Club in the South Australian National Football League (SANFL) during the 1980s and his younger brother, Sam Frost currently is on the Hawthorn list after spending time at Greater Western Sydney and Melbourne

== Statistics ==
Statistics are correct to the end of the 2018 season

Legend
G	Goals	K	Kicks	D	Disposals	T	Tackles
B	Behinds	H	Handballs	M	Marks

Season	Team	No.	Games	Totals							Averages (per game)						
Season	Team	No.	Games	G	B	K	H	D	M	T	G	B	K	H	D	M	T
2013	Collingwood	45	2	0	0	10	6	16	3	9	0.0	0.0	5.0	3.0	8.0	1.5	4.5
2014	Collingwood	45	22	0	0	109	78	187	69	61	0.0	0.0	5.0	3.5	8.5	3.1	2.8
2015	Collingwood	45	20	0	0	72	78	150	46	41	0.0	0.0	3.6	3.9	7.5	2.3	2.1
2016	Collingwood	45	10	0	0	48	48	96	32	31	0.0	0.0	4.8	4.8	9.6	3.2	3.1
2017	Brisbane Lions	45	2	0	0	2	8	10	1	2	0.0	0.0	1.0	4.0	5.0	0.5	1.0
2018	Brisbane Lions	45	-	-	-	-	-	-	-	-	-	-	-	-	-	-	
Career			56	0	0	241	218	459	151	144	0.0	0.0	4.3	3.9	8.2	2.7	2.6
