= Adam Oxley =

Australian rules footballer

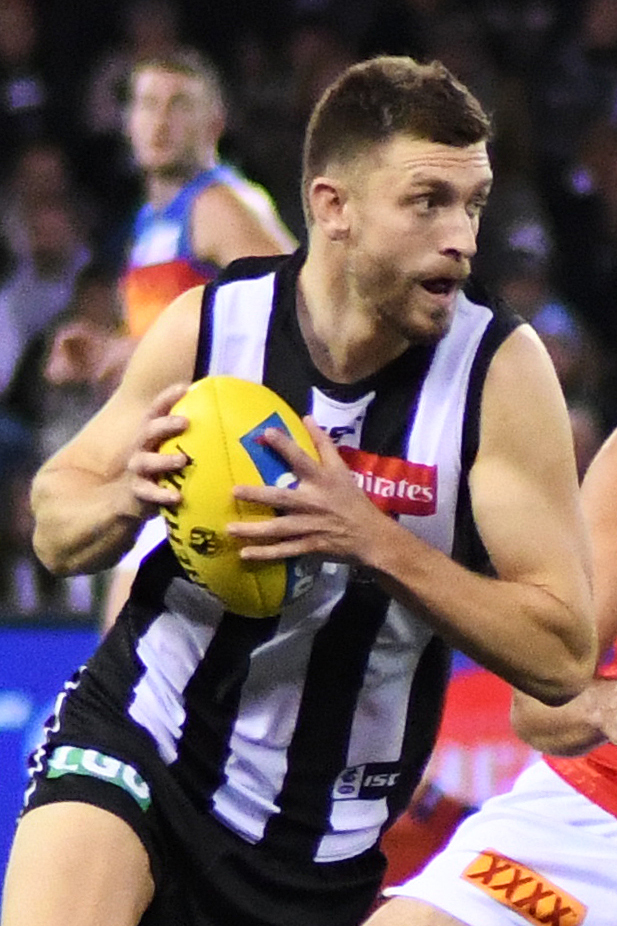
- Oxley playing for Collingwood in August 2018

Personal information
- Full name: Adam Oxley
- Born: 1 November 1992 (age 34); Canberra
- Original team: Redland (NEAFL)
- Draft: No. 35, 2013 rookie draft
- Position: Defender

Playing career^{1}
Years	Club	Games (Goals)
2013–2018	Collingwood	34 (10)
- ^{1} Playing statistics correct to the end of the 2018 season.

Adam Oxley (born 1 November 1992) is a former professional Australian rules footballer who played for the Collingwood Football Club in the Australian Football League (AFL). He was born in Canberra and only learned about Australian rules football when he moved with his family to Queensland at the age of seven. He was recruited from the Redland Australian Football Club in the North East Australian Football League (NEAFL) with the 35th selection in the 2013 rookie draft. He represented Queensland at the 2011 and 2012 AFL Under 18 Championships.

At the end of the 2013 season, Oxley was promoted to the Collingwood senior list.

In his fourth AFL appearance, against Adelaide in round 2 of the 2015 season, Oxley gathered a career high 33 disposals.

He was delisted by Collingwood at the conclusion of the 2017 season, with the club stating they may re-draft him in the 2018 rookie draft. On 27 November 2017, Oxley was re-drafted by Collingwood in the rookie draft.

After playing three games as a rookie in the 2018 season, Oxley was delisted by Collingwood again.

== Statistics ==
Statistics are correct to the end of the 2018 season

Legend
G	Goals	K	Kicks	D	Disposals	T	Tackles
B	Behinds	H	Handballs	M	Marks

Season	Team	No.	Games	Totals							Averages (per game)							Votes
Season	Team	No.	Games	G	B	K	H	D	M	T	G	B	K	H	D	M	T	Votes
2013	Collingwood	43	2	0	0	6	4	10	3	1	0	0	3.0	2.0	5.0	1.5	0.5	0
2014	Collingwood	43	0	—	—	—	—	—	—	—	—	—	—	—	—	—	—	0
2015	Collingwood	43	17	5	6	188	127	315	69	43	0.3	0.4	11.1	7.5	18.5	4.1	2.5	2
2016	Collingwood	43	12	4	2	129	74	203	59	28	0.3	0.2	10.8	6.2	16.9	4.9	2.3	0
2017	Collingwood	43	0	—	—	—	—	—	—	—	—	—	—	—	—	—	—	0
2018	Collingwood	43	3	1	1	21	13	34	9	11	0.3	0.3	7.0	4.3	11.3	3.0	3.7	0
Career			34	10	9	344	218	562	140	83	0.3	0.3	10.1	6.4	16.5	4.1	2.4	2
