= Caolan Mooney =

Irish Gaelic and Australian rules footballer

Personal information
- Full name: Caolan Mooney
- Born: 25 January 1993 (age 33)
- Original team: Down (county team)
- Draft: 81st, 2012 Rookie Draft, Collingwood
- Height: 184 cm (6 ft 0 in)
- Weight: 84 kg (185 lb)

Playing career^{1}
Years	Club	Games (Goals)
2012–2014	Collingwood	6 (2)
- ^{1} Playing statistics correct to the end of 2014.

Caolan Mooney (born 25 January 1993) is a Gaelic and Australian rules footballer from County Down, Northern Ireland.

== Gaelic football career ==
Caolan Mooney played for Rostrevor in County Down and attended St Mark's High School, Warrenpoint where he won a Down Under 14 championship. He then moved to St Colman's College, Newry to complete his A levels. He won the MacRory Cup and Hogan Cup double in 2010 and 2011. Mooney was part of the Down Minor team from 2009 to 2011. In 2011 he was named the captain of the team. Later that year Mooney was called up to the Down Senior panel, starting in one and coming on in three games, scoring 1-1.

== Honours ==
- MacRory Cup (2) 2010 2011
- Hogan Cup (2) 2010 2011
- Down Minor Football League (1) 2011
- Down Reserve Football Championship (1) 2010
- Ulster Colleges All Star (1) 2010

== AFL career ==
In mid-2010, he travelled to Australia to trial with Collingwood. He signed an International rookie contract with Collingwood in August 2010, but returned to Ireland to complete his schooling.

He returned to Melbourne in November 2011 and impressed with his speed. He was officially added to Collingwood's rookie list at the 2012 Rookie Draft in December 2011.

In June 2012, he was elevated from the rookie list and made his AFL debut against Fremantle at the Melbourne Cricket Ground, after kicking five goals the previous week for Collingwood in the Victorian Football League (VFL).

At the end of the 2014 season, Mooney quit Collingwood and returned to play Gaelic football with the Down county team.

== See also ==
- List of players who have converted from one football code to another
- Irish experiment
