= Jackson Ramsay =

Australian rules footballer

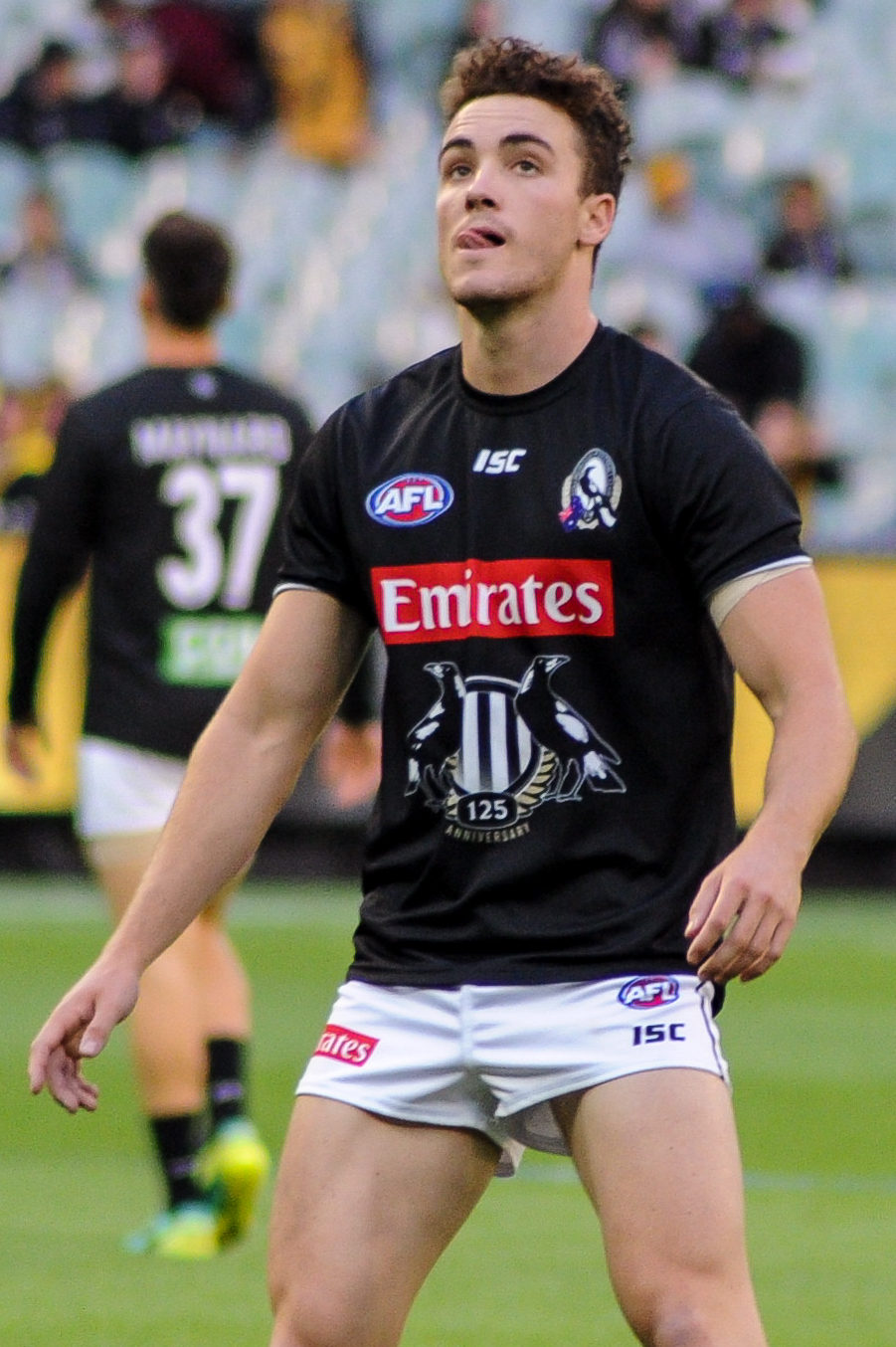
- Ramsay in March 2017

Personal information
- Full name: Jackson Ramsay
- Born: 20 November 1994 (age 31); Western Australia
- Original team: East Perth (WAFL)
- Draft: No. 38, 2012 AFL draft
- Height: 183 cm (6 ft 0 in)
- Weight: 77 kg (170 lb)
- Position: Defender

Playing career^{1}
Years	Club	Games (Goals)
2013–2017	Collingwood	17 (0)
- ^{1} Playing statistics correct to the end of 2017.

Jackson Ramsay (born 20 November 1994) is a former professional Australian rules footballer who played for the Collingwood Football Club in the Australian Football League (AFL). He was recruited by the club with draft pick #38 in the 2012 AFL draft. He made his debut in Round 22, 2014, against Greater Western Sydney at Spotless Stadium, following the previous round's injury crisis. After the match he was mentioned as one of the outstanding younger players of the team by the coach Nathan Buckley. He was delisted by Collingwood at the conclusion of the 2017 season.

== Statistics ==
Statistics are correct to the end of the 2017 season

Legend
G	Goals	K	Kicks	D	Disposals	T	Tackles
B	Behinds	H	Handballs	M	Marks

Season	Team	No.	Games	Totals							Averages (per game)						
Season	Team	No.	Games	G	B	K	H	D	M	T	G	B	K	H	D	M	T
2013	Collingwood	31	0	—	—	—	—	—	—	—	—	—	—	—	—	—	—
2014	Collingwood	31	2	0	0	14	8	22	5	7	0.0	0.0	7.0	4.0	11.0	2.5	3.5
2015	Collingwood	31	5	0	0	36	42	78	8	18	0.0	0.0	7.2	8.4	15.6	1.6	3.6
2016	Collingwood	31	2	0	0	24	18	42	14	5	0.0	0.0	12.0	9.0	21.0	7.0	2.5
2017	Collingwood	31	8	0	1	54	76	130	19	25	0.0	0.1	6.8	9.5	16.3	2.4	3.1
Career			17	0	1	128	144	272	46	55	0.0	0.1	7.5	8.5	16.0	2.7	3.2
