= Centre line (football) =

Australian rules football position

The centre line refers to a set of positions on an Australian rules football field. It consists of three players: two on the wings (left and right), and one in the centre.

Australian rules football positions
B:	back pocket	full-back	back pocket
HB:	half-back flank	centre half-back	half-back flank
C:	wing	centre	wing
HF:	half-forward flank	centre half-forward	half-forward flank
F:	forward pocket	full-forward	forward pocket
Foll:	ruckman	ruck rover	rover
Int:	interchange bench	interchange bench	interchange bench
Int:	interchange bench		
Coach:	coach		

== Wing ==
The two wingmen control the open spaces in the middle of the ground. They can vary in size, depending on team balance or opposition match-ups, but in general they need to be highly skilled, especially in kicking. Wingmen also require considerable pace and stamina, as they run up and down the ground linking play between defence and attack. The Victorian Football Association (VFA) abolished the wing role for many years, which sped up play and increased the average team score. However, this was not copied in other leagues.

Notable wingmen in Australian football over the years include:

- Wilfred "Chicken" Smallhorn (Fitzroy, 1930-1940), Brownlow Medallist 1933
- Herb Matthews (South Melbourne, 1932-1945), Brownlow Medallist 1940
- Thorold Merrett (Collingwood, 1950-1960)
- Stan Alves (Melbourne and North Melbourne, 1965-1979)
- Dick Clay (Richmond, 1966-1976)
- Keith Greig (North Melbourne, 1971-1985), Brownlow Medallist 1973, 1974 and also named on wing in AFL Team of the Century (1996)
- Bryan Wood (Richmond and Essendon, 1972-1986)
- Robbie Flower (Melbourne, 1973-1987)
- Russell Greene (St Kilda and Hawthorn, 1974-1988)
- Michael Turner (Geelong, 1974-1988)
- Robert DiPierdomenico (Hawthorn, 1975-1991), Brownlow Medallist 1986
- Doug Hawkins (Footscray and Fitzroy, 1978-1995)
- Dennis Carroll (Sydney, 1981-1991)
- Darren Millane (Collingwood, 1984-1991)
- Chris Mainwaring (West Coast, 1987-1999)
- Nicky Winmar (St. Kilda and Western Bulldogs, 1987-1999)
- Peter Matera (West Coast, 1990-2002) Norm Smith Medallist 1992
- Peter Riccardi (Geelong, 1992-2006)

== Centre ==
The centre player usually consists of a hard-running midfielder capable of feeding outside running teammates.

Notable centres in Australian football over the years include:

- Tom MacKenzie (West Torrens and North Adelaide, 1901-1913) Magarey Medallist 1902, 1905, 1906
- Jock McHale (Collingwood, 1903-1920)
- Edward "Carji" Greeves (Geelong, 1923-1933), inaugural winner of the Brownlow Medal in 1924
- Allan Hopkins (Footscray, 1925-1934), Brownlow Medallist 1930
- Allan La Fontaine (Melbourne, 1934-1945)
- Les Foote (North Melbourne and St Kilda, 1941-1955)
- Jack Clarke (Australian footballer, born 1933) (Essendon, 1951-1967)
- Denis Marshall (Claremont and Geelong, 1958-1972)
- Ian Stewart, (St Kilda and Richmond, 1963-1975), Brownlow Medallist 1965, 1966, 1971
- Russell Ebert (Port Adelaide and North Melbourne, 1968-1985), Magarey Medallist 1971, 1974, 1976, 1980
- Maurice Rioli (South Fremantle and Richmond, 1975-1990), Norm Smith Medallist 1982
- Tony Shaw (Collingwood, 1977-1994), Norm Smith Medallist 1990
- Terry Wallace (Hawthorn, Richmond and Footscray, 1978-1991)
- Garry McIntosh (Norwood, 1982-1998), Magarey Medallist 1994, 1995
- Greg Williams (Geelong, Sydney and Carlton, 1984-1997), Brownlow Medallist 1986, 1994
- Paul Couch (Geelong, 1985-1997), Brownlow Medallist 1989
- Nathan Buckley (Port Adelaide Magpies, Brisbane Bears and Collingwood, 1991-2007), Magarey Medallist 1992; Norm Smith Medallist 2002; Brownlow Medallist 2003
- Michael Voss
- Mark McVeigh
- Mark Ricciuto
- Ben Cousins
- James Hird
- Shane Crawford
- Scott West
- Jobe Watson
- Chris Judd

== Bibliography ==
- Pascoe, Robert (1995). The winter game : the complete history of Australian football. Port Melbourne: The Text Publishing Company. ISBN 978-0-85561-644-1.
