= Héritier Lumumba =

Australian rules footballer (born 1986)

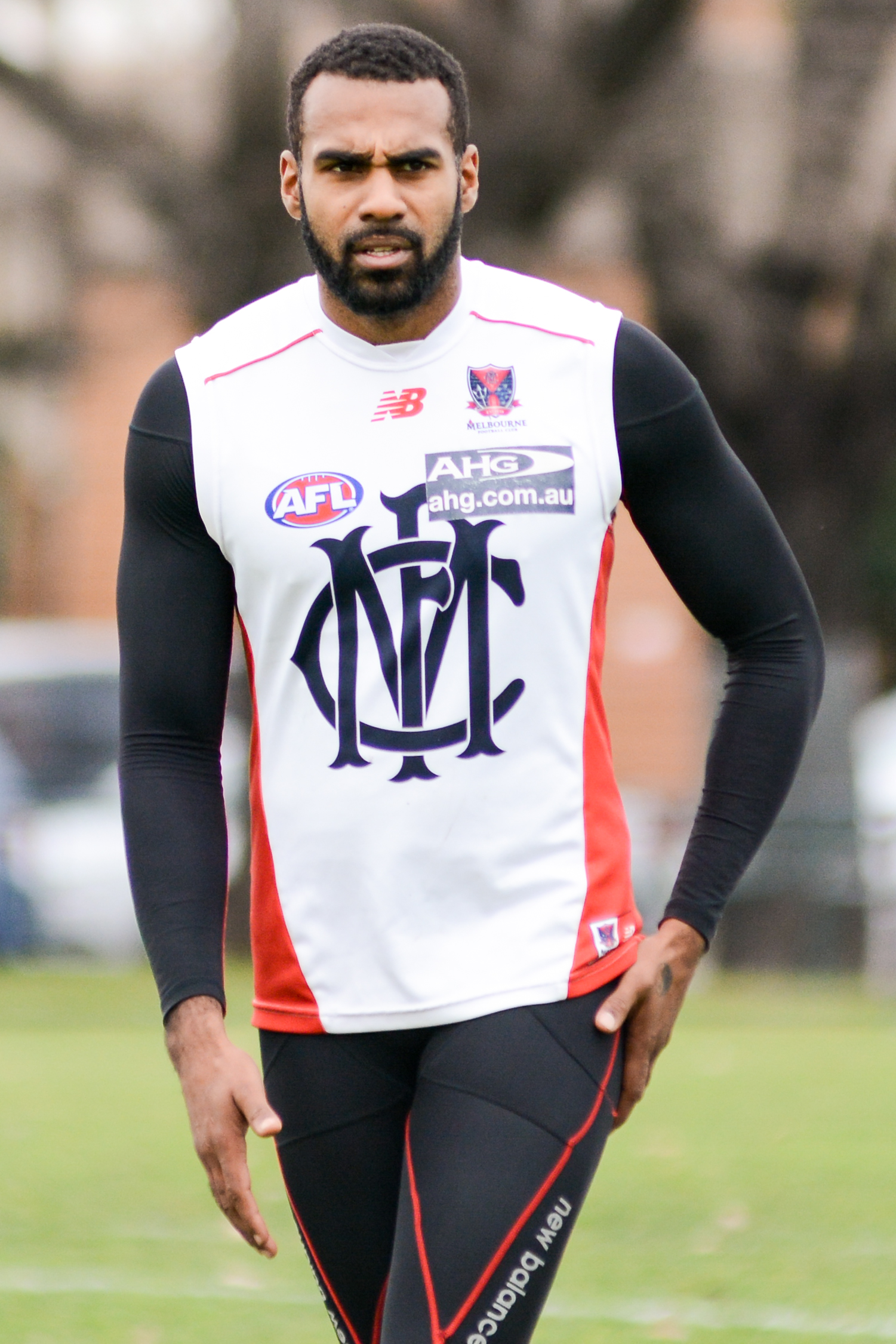
- Lumumba in 2015

Personal information
- Nicknames: Harry, H, Tier
- Born: 15 November 1986 (age 40); Rio de Janeiro, Brazil
- Original team: Claremont Football Club (WAFL)
- Draft: No. 20, 2005 rookie draft
- Debut: Round 18, 2005, Collingwood vs. Fremantle, at MCG
- Height: 188 cm (6 ft 2 in)
- Weight: 88 kg (194 lb)
- Position: Defender

Playing career^{1}
Years	Club	Games (Goals)
2005–2014	Collingwood	199 (28)
2015–2016	Melbourne	24 (2)
Total		223 (30)
- ^{1} Playing statistics correct to the end of 2016.

Career highlights
- AFL premiership player (2010); All-Australian team (2010)

Héritier Lumumba (formerly O'Brien; born 15 November 1986) is an Australian-Brazilian-Congolese former professional Australian rules footballer who played for the Collingwood Football Club and Melbourne Football Club in the Australian Football League (AFL). Known for his ability to turn defense into offense and his effectiveness in various roles, Lumumba was a trailblazer in the Australian Football League as its inaugural Multicultural Ambassador and the first and only player of Brazilian and Congolese descent.

Lumumba's professional football career commenced with the Collingwood Football Club in 2004. With Collingwood, he gained All-Australian honors, won an AFL premiership, and was recognised for his leadership qualities, earning a place in Collingwood's leadership group. In 2014, Lumumba was traded to the Melbourne Football Club, where he made an immediate impact on the team and continued in a leadership role until his retirement in 2016, due to a concussion.

In addition to his distinguished on field career, Lumumba played a significant role in promoting human rights and community engagement. Former Australian Prime Minister, Julia Gillard, nominated Lumumba as a multicultural ambassador of Australia, via the people of Australia program. His stance on racial and cultural issues has also invited public scrutiny and controversy. However, his dedication to fostering dialogue on the critical social issues remains a constant thread in his public persona. Post-retirement, Lumumba has transitioned into roles in High Performance, Strategic Partnerships, and in Ethnobotanical research. In April 2023, he was appointed the High Performance and Strategic Partnerships director of the Congolese National Rugby Federation.

== Playing career ==
=== Collingwood ===
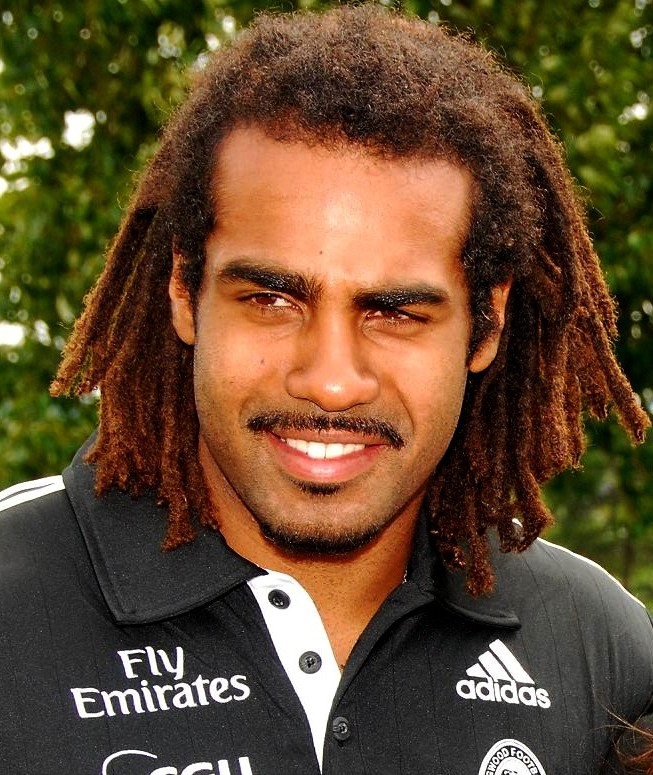
Lumumba in 2012

The 188 cm (6 ft 2 in) Lumumba played most of his football as a medium defender. He was selected with pick 21 in the 2004 AFL Rookie Draft by Collingwood, and made his debut in Round 18 of 2005 against Fremantle at the MCG. He kicked a goal against the Kangaroos shortly after his debut, and did enough to be retained on the rookie list. In 2006 he showed more improvement and was elevated to the senior list again during the year, this time due to the absence of Sean Rusling, playing a total of nine games.

Coach Mick Malthouse at one point in an interview challenged the AFL's rules on rookies in response to not being able to permanently play Lumumba in the seniors on the basis of his excellent form.

He was elevated to the senior list for season 2007. In 2008, he came 5th in the Copeland Trophy count, Collingwood's best and fairest. In 2009, he came 4th in the Copeland Trophy.

He played in numbers 43, 30 and his final number 8. In 2010, he won All-Australian honours playing off the half-back flank. He was instrumental in Collingwood's 2010 grand final replay win over St Kilda and kicked a long goal from the boundary line late in the game.

=== Melbourne ===
On 15 October 2014, after issues with the club and management, Lumumba and Collingwood agreed to part ways and he joined the Melbourne Football Club in a three-club deal with Mitch Clark going to Geelong and Travis Varcoe joining Collingwood.

Lumumba made his Melbourne debut in round 1, 2015, against Gold Coast, in what was also his 200th AFL game. He kicked a goal in a 26-point win for his new club.

Lumumba missed the round one match against Greater Western Sydney in 2016, before playing the next five matches; he missed the remainder of the season after suffering from concussion symptoms. Despite being cleared to train by Melbourne doctors, he did not return to pre-season training in November after being advised to retire by several specialists. He retired from AFL football in December.

== Racism allegations ==
In 2017, the documentary Fair Game was released about Heritier's life and his stories of racism while playing professional football. He called the culture at Collingwood a "boys' club for racist and sexist jokes" and stated that his teammates nicknamed him "chimp", a term with a strong history of connotations as a racial slur against black people. He stood up to the racism and continues to do so.

On Network 10's The Project, Lumumba was interviewed by Waleed Aly about his experiences and was disappointed in Aly's response to the interview, as Lumumba felt that he approached the interview with the "preconceived idea that we would both see eye to eye on the basic truths of racism/white supremacy ... However, it is now very clear to me, that he and I have fundamental differences in our understanding of what racism/white supremacy is, and how it should be effectively dealt with." Lumumba felt that he was undermined by Aly and claimed that Aly was indifferent to racism.

In 2020, the feud was again reported in the media when Lumumba called The Project "unethical and dishonest" in their treatment of him. He said that Collingwood coach, Nathan Buckley, told him to back off his accusations because it would throw the club president, Eddie McGuire, "under the bus".

Collingwood wanted to sit down with Lumumba to reconcile, but Lumumba refused until he received a full acknowledgement and apology over his treatment.

Lumumba's accounts of racism were rejected by former coach Mick Malthouse, Buckley and McGuire, but they were affirmed by a number of players including Chris Dawes, Brent Macaffer, Leon Davis, Andrew Krakouer, Chris Egan and Shae McNamara. Former Melbourne coach Paul Roos also confirmed hearing Lumumba's account and was "shocked" when Lumumba told him of the culture at Collingwood and what he had endured.

In 2021, the Do Better report was leaked to the Australian media. The report found the Collingwood Football Club guilty of systemic racism. This has led to calls for The Project, and hosts Waleed Aly and Peter Helliar, to apologise on-air. Helliar has written an apology, "This report is heartbreaking. To @iamlumumba I am truly, unequivocally sorry. I should have believed you. I will do better." A few days later, the interview was no longer accessible on the program's Facebook account. A former executive producer at Network 10 stated, "What 'The Project' should do right now is show a bit of that clip, have Waleed and Pete sit there and talk about it and the lessons they've learned and what they'll do going forward."

== Personal life ==
Lumumba was born to an Afro-Brazilian mother and a Congolese-Angolan father in Rio de Janeiro, and moved to Perth, Western Australia when he was 3 years old. He went to school at Rossmoyne Primary from 1994 to 1999 and then Rossmoyne Senior High School. He supported the Essendon Bombers as a child, with his family owning a pet dog named Sheedy after the long-time Essendon coach Kevin Sheedy. Lumumba was raised by his Australian stepfather, Ralph, who died by suicide shortly before the start of the 2009 football season; Lumumba considered taking a year off football to be with his family but ultimately decided to continue playing. He was 19 years old when he was reunited with his biological father, after spending 13 years apart. Lumumba's younger sister, Raquel O’Brien, is a podcast producer who has spoken publicly about her traumatic childhood.

Lumumba's surname was changed to "O'Brien" when he was 9 years old and was given the nickname "Harry" shortly after, becoming known as "Harry O'Brien". In December 2013, he changed his surname back to "Lumumba" and discontinued the use of the nickname "Harry", citing his journey of decolonisation as the reason for the change.

Lumumba became the AFL's first multicultural ambassador and worked to engage migrant communities through football. He was the AFL's multicultural ambassador from 2006 to 2013. In 2012, Prime Minister Julia Gillard recognised Lumumba as one of the People of Australia ambassadors. He was also made the ambassador to the Dalai Lama's visit to Australia in June 2011.

== Statistics ==
Legend
G	Goals	K	Kicks	D	Disposals	T	Tackles
B	Behinds	H	Handballs	M	Marks

Season	Team	No.	Games	Totals							Averages (per game)						
Season	Team	No.	Games	G	B	K	H	D	M	T	G	B	K	H	D	M	T
2005	Collingwood	43	4	1	1	22	16	38	8	7	0.3	0.3	5.5	4.0	9.5	2.0	1.8
2006	Collingwood	43	9	0	0	51	43	94	25	12	0.0	0.0	5.7	4.8	10.4	2.8	1.3
2007	Collingwood	30	23	0	1	153	93	246	74	57	0.0	0.0	6.7	4.0	10.7	3.2	2.5
2008	Collingwood	8	24	2	1	189	140	329	106	45	0.1	0.0	7.9	5.8	13.7	4.4	1.9
2009	Collingwood	8	25	5	0	230	172	402	106	45	0.2	0.0	9.2	6.9	16.1	4.2	1.8
2010	Collingwood	8	26	6	4	264	142	406	99	62	0.2	0.2	10.2	5.5	15.6	3.8	2.4
2011	Collingwood	8	24	1	2	245	176	421	110	43	0.0	0.1	10.2	7.3	17.5	4.6	1.8
2012	Collingwood	8	24	3	2	239	146	385	94	58	0.1	0.1	10.0	6.1	16.0	3.9	2.4
2013	Collingwood	8	19	7	10	263	161	424	105	47	0.4	0.5	13.8	8.5	22.3	5.5	2.5
2014	Collingwood	8	21	3	5	222	198	420	82	55	0.1	0.2	10.6	9.4	20.0	3.9	2.6
2015	Melbourne	8	19	2	1	143	127	270	61	61	0.1	0.1	7.5	6.7	14.2	3.2	3.2
2016	Melbourne	8	5	0	0	41	45	86	21	8	0.0	0.0	8.2	9.0	17.2	4.2	1.6
Career			223	30	27	2062	1459	3521	891	500	0.1	0.1	9.3	6.5	15.8	4.0	2.2

== Honours and achievements ==
Team

- AFL premiership: 2010
- McClelland Trophy (2): 2010, 2011

Individual

- All-Australian: 2010

== Books ==
Lumumba published a book in 2014 called It's Cool to be Conscious, that includes personal stories from his life, both on and off the field.

- It's Cool to be Conscious. Hay House. 29 May 2014. ISBN 978-1-40193-851-2.
