= 2010 Collingwood Football Club season =

Collingwood Football Club
2010 season
- President: Eddie McGuire
- Coach: Mick Malthouse
- Captain: Nick Maxwell
- Home ground: MCG
- Pre-season competition: First round
- AFL season: 1st
- Finals series: Premiers
- Best and Fairest: Dane Swan
- Leading goalkicker: Alan Didak (41)
- Highest home attendance: 100,016 vs. St Kilda (25 September 2010)
- Lowest home attendance: 38,781 vs. West Coast (3 July 2010)
- Average home attendance: 62,356

The 2010 AFL season was the Collingwood Football Club's, (The Magpies), 114th season playing Australian rules football in the Victorian or Australian Football League. It was the club's most successful season since 1930 and the club's most successful season in AFL era. The Magpies won the premiership after defeating St Kilda by 56 points in the Grand Final Replay. Collingwood also won the McClelland Trophy for finishing first at the end of the home and away season. 2010 marked the first time that Collingwood won 20 matches in the same season, their first McClelland Trophy since 1970 and ended a 19-season premiership drought dating back to 1990.

== Season results ==
=== Pre-season ===
==== NAB Cup ====
Round	Date	Opponent	Home/Away	Score (Collingwood's score is in bold)	Result (includes margin)	Venue
1	Friday, 19 February 7:40pm	St Kilda	Away	2.13.4 (100) - **1.13.12 (99)**	Lost by 1 point	Etihad Stadium

==== NAB Challenge ====
Week	Date	Opponent	Home/Away	Score (Collingwood's score is in bold)	Result (includes margin)	Venue
1	Friday, 26 February 7:00pm	Adelaide	**Home**	**11.8 (74)** - 8.6 (54)	Won by 20 points	Traeger Park
2	Friday, 5 March 4:00pm	Richmond	Away	9.8 (62) - **11.24 (90)**	Won by 28 points	Visy Park
3	Saturday, 13 March 3:00pm	Port Adelaide	Away	15.7 (97) - **27.16 (178)**	Won by 81 points	Malseed Park, Mt Gambier, South Australia

=== Regular home and away season ===
Round	Date	Opponent	Home/Away	Score (Collingwood's score is in bold)	Result (includes margin)	Venue	Position on Ladder
1	Sunday, 28 March 2:10pm	Western Bulldogs	Away	13.15 (93) - **19.15 (129)**	Won by 36 points	Etihad Stadium	5th
2	Saturday, 4 April 2:10pm	Melbourne	**Home**	**12.14 (86)** - 12.13 (85)	Won by 1 point	MCG	5th
3	Friday, 10 April 7:40pm	St Kilda	Away	10.9 (69) - **4.17 (41)**	Lost by 28 points	Etihad Stadium	7th
4	Saturday, 18 April 7:10pm	Hawthorn	**Home**	**17.21 (123)** - 8.11 (59)	Won by 64 points	MCG	6th
5	Sunday, 25 April 2:40pm	Essendon	**Home**	**18.12 (120)** - 8.7 (55)	Won by 65 points	MCG	3rd
6	Sunday, 2 May 2:10pm	Carlton	Away	16.6 (102) - **24.11 (155)**	Won by 53 points	MCG	2nd
7	Saturday, 8 May 7:10pm	North Melbourne	**Home**	**23.19 (157)** - 14.7 (91)	Won by 66 points	MCG	1st
8	Friday, 14 May 8:40pm	Fremantle	Away	15.7 (97) - **20.13 (133)**	Won by 36 points	Subiaco Oval	1st
9	Friday, 21 May 7:40pm	Geelong	**Home**	**6.14 (50)** - 12.14 (86)	Lost by 36 points	MCG	2nd
10	Saturday, 29 May 7:10pm	Brisbane Lions	Away	13.10 (88) - **11.14 (80)**	Lost by 8 points	Gabba	3rd
11	Sunday, 6 June 4:40pm	Western Bulldogs	**Home**	**17.11 (113)** - 16.7 (103)	Won by 10 points	Etihad Stadium	2nd
12	Monday, 14 June 2:10pm	Melbourne	Away	11.10 (76) - **9.22 (76)**	Draw	MCG	3rd
13	Saturday, 26 June 7:10pm	Sydney	Away	10.11 (71) - **13.18 (96)**	Won by 26 points	ANZ Stadium	3rd
14	Saturday, 3 July 7:10pm	West Coast	**Home**	**20.15 (135)** - 7.10 (52)	Won by 83 points	Etihad Stadium	3rd
15	Friday, 9 July 8:10pm	Port Adelaide	Away	12.7 (79) - **16.9 (105)**	Won by 26 points	AAMI Stadium	3rd
16	Saturday, 17 July 2:10pm	St Kilda	**Home**	**15.10 (100)** - 6.16 (52)	Won by 48 points	MCG	1st
17	Saturday, 24 July 2:10pm	Richmond	**Home**	**19.13 (127)** - 6.9 (45)	Won by 82 points	MCG	1st
18	Saturday, 31 July 2:10pm	Carlton	**Home**	**15.15 (105)** - 9.3 (57)	Won by 48 points	MCG	1st
19	Saturday, 7 August 7:10pm	Geelong	Away	12.13 (85) - **14.23 (107)**	Won by 22 points	MCG	1st
20	Friday, 13 August 7:40pm	Essendon	Away	10.4 (64) - **24.18 (162)**	Won by 98 points	MCG	1st
21	Saturday, 21 August 7:10pm	Adelaide	**Home**	**6.18 (54)** - 7.9 (51)	Won by 3 points	MCG	1st
22	Saturday, 28 August 2:10pm	Hawthorn	Away	15.8 (98) - **13.17 (95)**	Lost by 3 points	MCG	1st

=== Finals series ===
Final	Date	Opponent	Home/Away	Score (Collingwood's score is in bold)	Result (includes margin)	Venue
**Qualifying Final**	Saturday, 4 September 7:20pm	Western Bulldogs	**Home**	**17.22 (124)** - 8.14 (62)	Won by 62 points	MCG
**Preliminary Final**	Friday, 17 September 7:40pm	Geelong	**Home**	**18.12 (120)** - 11.13 (79)	Won by 41 points	MCG
**Grand Final**	Saturday, 25 September 2:30pm	St Kilda	**Home**	**9.14 (68)** - 10.8 (68)	Draw	MCG
**Grand Final Replay**	Saturday, 2 October 2:30pm	St Kilda	**Home**	**16.12 (108)** - 7.10 (52)	Won by 56 points	MCG

== Ladder ==
2010 AFL ladder
Pos	Team	Pld	W	L	D	PF	PA	PP	Pts	
1	Collingwood (P)	22	17	4	1	2349	1658	141.7	70	Finals series
2	Geelong	22	17	5	0	2518	1702	147.9	68	Finals series
3	St Kilda	22	15	6	1	1935	1591	121.6	62	Finals series
4	Western Bulldogs	22	14	8	0	2174	1734	125.4	56	Finals series
5	Sydney	22	13	9	0	2017	1863	108.3	52	Finals series
6	Fremantle	22	13	9	0	2168	2087	103.9	52	Finals series
7	Hawthorn	22	12	9	1	2044	1847	110.7	50	Finals series
8	Carlton	22	11	11	0	2143	1983	108.1	44	Finals series
9	North Melbourne	22	11	11	0	1930	2208	87.4	44	
10	Port Adelaide	22	10	12	0	1749	2123	82.4	40	
11	Adelaide	22	9	13	0	1763	1870	94.3	36	
12	Melbourne	22	8	13	1	1863	1971	94.5	34	
13	Brisbane Lions	22	7	15	0	1775	2158	82.3	28	
14	Essendon	22	7	15	0	1930	2402	80.3	28	
15	Richmond	22	6	16	0	1714	2348	73.0	24	
16	West Coast	22	4	18	0	1773	2300	77.1	16	

Source: AFL ladder
Rules for classification: 1) points; 2) percentage; 3) number of points for.
(P) Premiers
