= Nathan Brown (Australian footballer, born 1988) =

Australian rules footballer

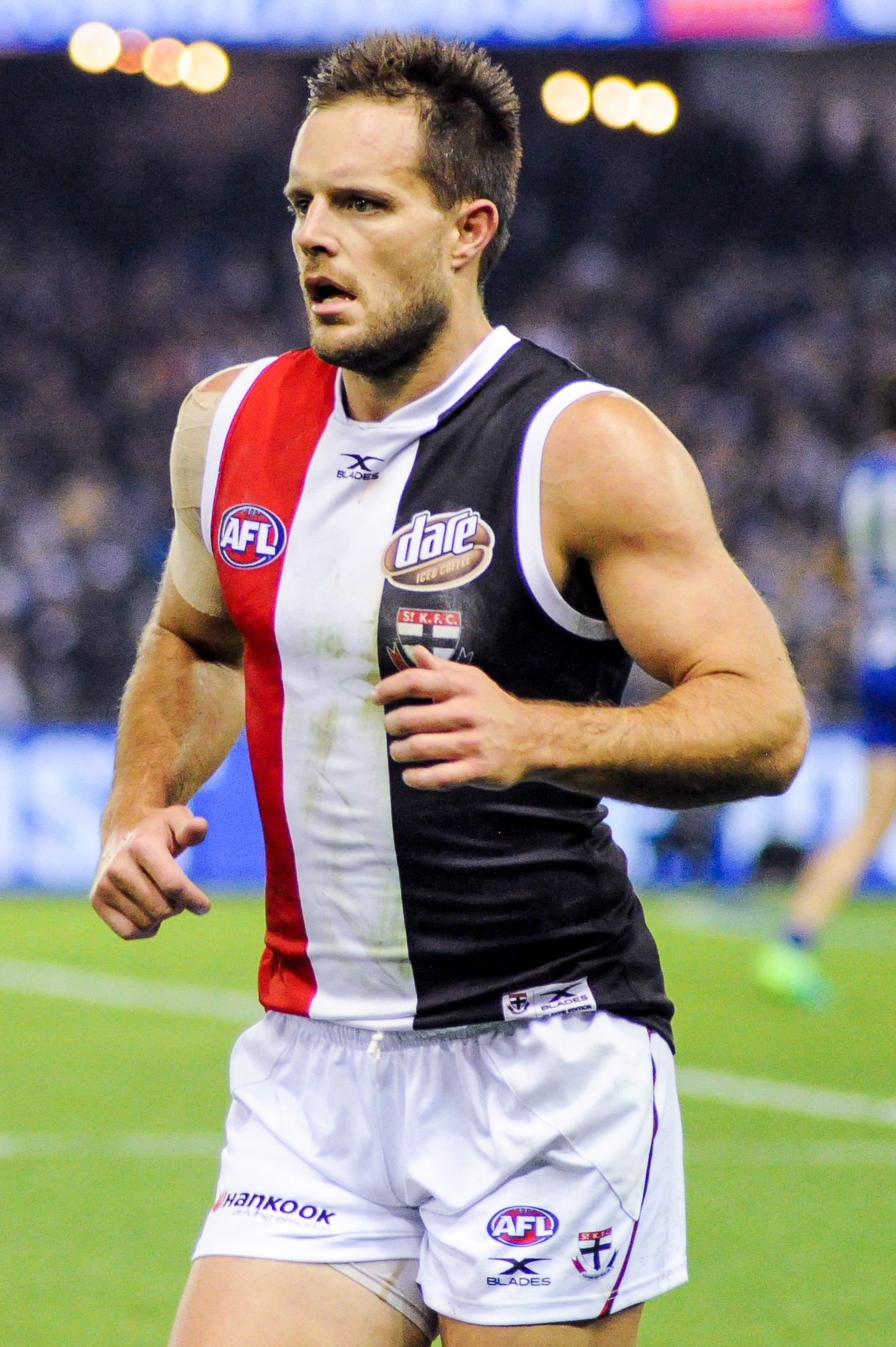
- Brown playing for St Kilda in June 2017

Personal information
- Full name: Nathan J. Brown
- Born: 17 December 1988 (age 37); Upper Ferntree Gully
- Original team: Ballarat Football Club/North Ballarat Rebels (TAC Cup)
- Draft: No. 10, 2006 national draft
- Height: 195 cm (6 ft 5 in)
- Weight: 101 kg (223 lb)
- Position: Full-back

Playing career^{1}
Years	Club	Games (Goals)
2008–2016	Collingwood	130 (7)
2017–2020	St Kilda	53 (0)
Total		183 (7)
- ^{1} Playing statistics correct to the end of 2019.

Career highlights
- AFL premiership player 2010; Harry Collier Trophy 2008; 2008 AFL Rising Star nominee

Nathan J. Brown (born 17 December 1988) is a former professional Australian rules footballer who played for the Collingwood Football Club and the St Kilda Football Club in the Australian Football League (AFL).

== Early life ==
Brown is a former student of St Patrick's College, Ballarat. He was part of their 1st XVIII that won the coveted Herald Sun Shield in 2005. Tall and mobile, Brown is a former basketballer who converted to football and was earmarked for centre halfback, following some well acclaimed performances for Vic Country in the 2006 Under 18 National Championships.

== AFL career ==
Brown became the third player with the same name in the AFL when he was selected by Collingwood with the 10th selection in the 2006 National AFL Draft.

Brown made his debut for Collingwood in Round 1 of the 2008 season against Fremantle at the Melbourne Cricket Ground in front of 45,000 fans. He immediately made impressions with speed and great defensive attributes against Matthew Pavlich, who is recognised as one of the best forwards in the game, holding him to only one goal. He would follow up immediately, playing on one of the competition's best players, Jonathan Brown of the Brisbane Lions, and Matthew Richardson of Richmond in the next fortnight, holding each to two and one goal(s), respectively.

Even though Brown was yet to make his senior debut, he was selected as the Collingwood alternative delegate for the AFL Players Association in 2008, behind Tarkyn Lockyer and Nick Maxwell.

Brown was nominated for the AFL Rising Star Award for his performance in Round 10 2008 against the West Coast Eagles in which Collingwood won by 100 points.

Brown won the Harry Collier Trophy (Best First Year Player) in 2008.

Brown celebrated his 50th game in the 2010 AFL Grand Final replay.

At the conclusion of the 2016 season, Brown joined the St Kilda Football Club as a restricted free agent after Collingwood elected not to match the contract offer.

In August 2018, Brown was sent straight to the AFL Tribunal following a late bump on Essendon player Adam Saad. He was suspended for three matches.

== Post-AFL career ==
In 2023, Brown accepted a post as the Director of Football at The Geelong College.

== Personal life ==
He has a twin brother, Mitch Brown, who played for the West Coast Eagles and an older brother named Cameron. As a child he was a Carlton supporter, while his twin brother was a Collingwood supporter. The twins were born in Upper Ferntree Gully and later moved to Ballarat where they grew up.

== Statistics ==
Statistics are correct to the end of the 2019 season

Legend
G	Goals	K	Kicks	D	Disposals	T	Tackles
B	Behinds	H	Handballs	M	Marks

-

Season	Team	No.	Games	Totals							Averages (per game)						
Season	Team	No.	Games	G	B	K	H	D	M	T	G	B	K	H	D	M	T
2008	Collingwood	16	23	4	2	94	86	180	41	53	0.2	0.1	4.1	3.7	7.8	1.8	2.3
2009	Collingwood	16	14	2	2	51	78	129	40	26	0.1	0.1	3.6	5.6	9.2	2.9	1.9
2010	Collingwood	16	13	0	0	49	73	122	36	25	0.0	0.0	3.8	5.6	9.4	2.8	1.9
2011	Collingwood	16	0	—	—	—	—	—	—	—	—	—	—	—	—	—	—
2012	Collingwood	16	18	0	0	84	87	171	57	33	0.0	0.0	4.7	4.8	9.5	3.2	1.8
2013	Collingwood	16	22	1	1	87	117	204	89	37	0.0	0.0	4.0	5.3	9.3	4.0	1.7
2014	Collingwood	16	3	0	0	10	8	18	2	1	0.0	0.0	3.3	2.7	6.0	0.7	0.3
2015	Collingwood	16	21	0	0	107	118	225	66	46	0.0	0.0	5.1	5.6	10.7	3.1	2.2
2016	Collingwood	16	16	0	0	84	91	175	65	28	0.0	0.0	5.3	5.7	10.9	4.1	1.8
2017	St Kilda	22	22	0	0	43	111	154	28	33	0.0	0.0	2.0	5.0	7.0	1.3	1.5
2018	St Kilda	22	15	0	0	41	70	110	32	27	0.0	0.0	2.7	4.7	7.4	2.1	1.8
2019	St Kilda	22	16	0	0	64	66	130	42	26	0.0	0.0	4.0	4.1	8.1	2.6	1.6
Career			183	7	5	714	905	1619	498	335	0.1	0.0	3.9	5.0	8.9	2.7	1.8
