= Tyson Goldsack =

Australian rules footballer

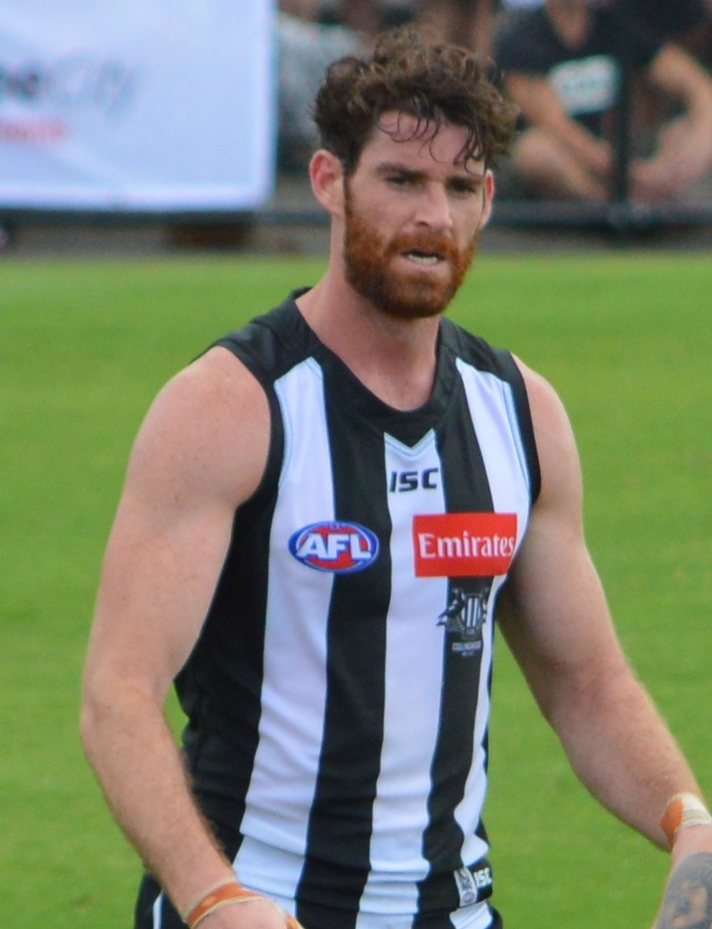
- Goldsack during a pre-season match in March 2017

Personal information
- Full name: Tyson Goldsack
- Nickname: Moneybags
- Born: 22 May 1987 (age 39); Victoria
- Original team: Gippsland Power (TAC Cup)
- Draft: No. 63, 2006 national draft, Collingwood
- Height: 193 cm (6 ft 4 in)
- Weight: 92 kg (203 lb)
- Position: Defender

Playing career^{1}
| Years | Club | Games (Goals) |
| 2007–2019 | Collingwood | 165 (50) |
| 2021 | Port Adelaide | 0 (0) |
| Total | | 165 (50) |

International team honours^{2}
| Years | Team | Games (Goals) |
| 2010 | Australia | 2 |
- ^{1} Playing statistics correct to the end of 2019.^{2} Representative statistics correct as of 2010.

Career highlights
- Collingwood premiership player: 2010; Harry Collier Trophy: 2007; AFL Rising Star nominee: 2007

Tyson Goldsack (born 22 May 1987) is a former professional Australian rules footballer who played for the Collingwood Football Club in the Australian Football League (AFL).

== Early life ==
Originally from Pakenham, Victoria, he played with Gippsland Power at TAC Cup level in 2005–06 in between completing a pre-season with Hawthorn. He showed good speed at the Victorian State Screening Session with a 20-metre sprint time of 3.00 seconds. A good second season in the TAC Cup as a mature-aged player would see him become one of few 19-year-olds drafted at the 2006 AFL draft, selected by Collingwood in the fourth round of the draft with pick 63.

== AFL career ==
In 2007, he played four games with the reserves side in the Victorian Football League as a defender, making an impression, being emergency for the round 7 clash against Carlton, before making a surprise AFL debut against the Western Bulldogs at Telstra Dome. He impressed to keep his spot, but he established a name for himself in round 12 when he played an effective containing role on Michael O'Loughlin of Sydney, and then on Hawthorn spearhead Lance Franklin a week later. He would continue to play the role, missing one game through a rest, for the rest of the season, including the final series. He once again nullified O'Loughlin in round 21, where he had 25 disposals and 8 marks, and earned an AFL Rising Star nomination.

Goldsack was recalled for the 2010 Grand Final replay, replacing Leon Davis. Goldsack kicked the first goal of the game. His mother was one of many people to have successfully bet on him kicking the first goal despite the high odds. Artist Jamie Cooper featured the bet in the celebratory painting of the Collingwood team, with Goldsack holding a betting slip with the words "Mrs" and "80-1" written on it.

Goldsack struggled for opportunities in the 2016 season, playing only 4 games while battling indifferent form and injuries.

Goldsack revived his career at Collingwood in the 2017 season, playing 20 games and re-establishing himself as one of the club's most important and courageous players. He played 20 games for the season, and signed a one-year contract extension for the 2018 season, though he entered the season as a free agent.

In August 2019, Goldsack announced his retirement, effective after the 2019 AFL finals series.

== Post-football career ==
In 2020 Goldsack was signed as a development coach at the Port Adelaide Football Club. He was also signed to play for the club's reserves team; the Port Adelaide Magpies; in the SANFL, though the team sat out the season due to the COVID-19 pandemic. In December 2020, Goldsack nominated for the AFL national and rookie drafts where Port Adelaide selected him with their first pick in the rookie draft. He played no games for the senior team in the 2021 season, and played 10 games for the Magpies in the SANFL. He was appointed coach of the SANFL team ahead of the 2023 season and was also made the senior team's forwards development coach. For the next two seasons Goldsack was assistant coach at the Power, until he returned to Collingwood as an assistant coach ahead of the 2026 season.

== Statistics ==
Statistics are correct to the end of the 2018 season

Legend
| G | Goals | K | Kicks | D | Disposals | T | Tackles |
| B | Behinds | H | Handballs | M | Marks |

| Season | Team | No. | Games | Totals | | | | | | | Averages (per game) | | | | | | |
| Season | Team | No. | Games | G | B | K | H | D | M | T | G | B | K | H | D | M | T |
|---|---|---|---|---|---|---|---|---|---|---|---|---|---|---|---|---|---|
| 2007 | Collingwood | 38 | 17 | 0 | 1 | 134 | 94 | 228 | 58 | 50 | 0.0 | 0.1 | 7.9 | 5.5 | 13.4 | 3.4 | 2.9 |
| 2008 | Collingwood | 38 | 16 | 4 | 0 | 83 | 54 | 137 | 40 | 51 | 0.3 | 0.0 | 5.2 | 3.4 | 8.6 | 2.5 | 3.2 |
| 2009 | Collingwood | 6 | 12 | 1 | 0 | 71 | 65 | 136 | 38 | 34 | 0.1 | 0.0 | 5.9 | 5.4 | 11.3 | 3.2 | 2.8 |
| 2010 | Collingwood | 6 | 11 | 1 | 2 | 60 | 65 | 125 | 36 | 35 | 0.1 | 0.2 | 5.5 | 5.9 | 11.4 | 3.3 | 3.2 |
| 2011 | Collingwood | 6 | 13 | 1 | 2 | 83 | 66 | 149 | 49 | 40 | 0.1 | 0.2 | 6.4 | 5.1 | 11.5 | 3.8 | 3.1 |
| 2012 | Collingwood | 6 | 22 | 24 | 19 | 142 | 102 | 244 | 81 | 69 | 1.1 | 0.9 | 6.5 | 4.6 | 11.1 | 3.7 | 3.1 |
| 2013 | Collingwood | 6 | 13 | 6 | 4 | 89 | 71 | 160 | 41 | 44 | 0.5 | 0.3 | 6.8 | 5.5 | 12.3 | 3.2 | 3.4 |
| 2014 | Collingwood | 6 | 20 | 10 | 5 | 115 | 110 | 225 | 66 | 86 | 0.5 | 0.3 | 5.8 | 5.5 | 11.3 | 3.3 | 4.3 |
| 2015 | Collingwood | 6 | 13 | 1 | 0 | 85 | 76 | 161 | 48 | 31 | 0.1 | 0 | 6.5 | 5.8 | 12.4 | 3.7 | 2.4 |
| 2016 | Collingwood | 6 | 4 | 1 | 0 | 31 | 26 | 57 | 17 | 6 | 0.3 | 0 | 7.8 | 6.5 | 14.3 | 4.3 | 1.5 |
| 2017 | Collingwood | 6 | 20 | 1 | 4 | 124 | 141 | 265 | 72 | 49 | 0.1 | 0.2 | 6.2 | 7.1 | 13.3 | 3.6 | 2.5 |
| 2018 | Collingwood | 6 | 4 | 0 | 1 | 11 | 19 | 30 | 5 | 9 | 0.0 | 0.1 | 2.8 | 4.8 | 7.5 | 1.3 | 2.3 |
| 2019 | Collingwood | 6 | 0 | 0 | 0 | 0 | 0 | 0 | 0 | 0 | 0.0 | 0.0 | 0.0 | 0.0 | 0.0 | 0.0 | 0.0 |
| Career | | | 165 | 50 | 38 | 1028 | 889 | 1917 | 551 | 504 | 0.3 | 0.2 | 6.2 | 5.4 | 11.6 | 3.3 | 3.1 |

== Personal life ==
Goldsack is the founder of Utonic, a line of sports drinks. He has also served as an ambassador for Fitness First.
