= Robert Eddy =

Australian rules footballer

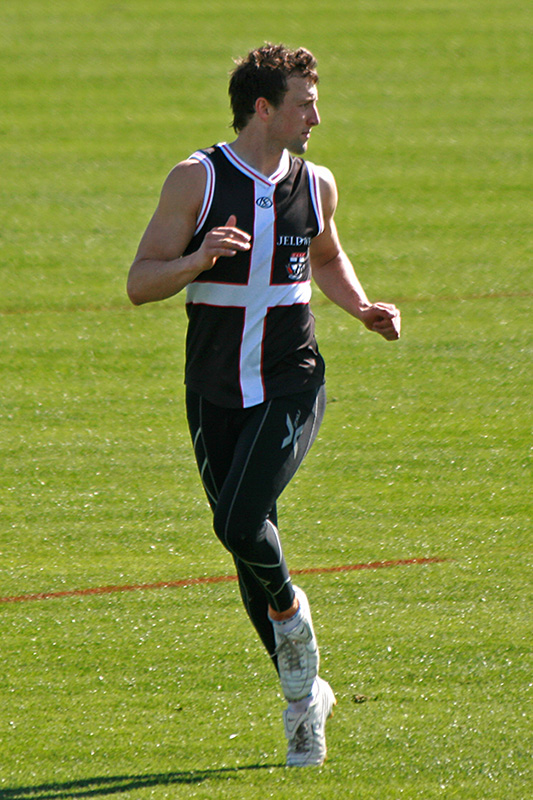

Personal information
- Full name: Robert Eddy
- Born: 7 January 1988 (age 38)
- Original team: Stony Creek/Gippsland Power (TAC Cup)
- Draft: No. 39, 2007 Rookie Draft, St Kilda; No. 57, 2010 National Draft, St Kilda
- Height: 182 cm (6 ft 0 in)
- Weight: 83 kg (183 lb)
- Position: Forward

Playing career^{1}
Years	Club	Games (Goals)
2007–2011	St Kilda	33 (10)
- ^{1} Playing statistics correct to the end of 2011.

Robert Eddy (born 7 January 1988) is a former Australian rules footballer. He previously played for St Kilda in the Australian Football League (AFL). Following his career with the Saints, he played for Woodville-West Torrens Football Club in the South Australian National Football League.

== Overview ==
Eddy grew up in Gippsland, Victoria and attended Caulfield Grammar School in Melbourne.

He was an elite ball winner at junior level, averaging 27 disposals per game for Gippsland during the 2006 TAC Cup season.

== AFL career ==
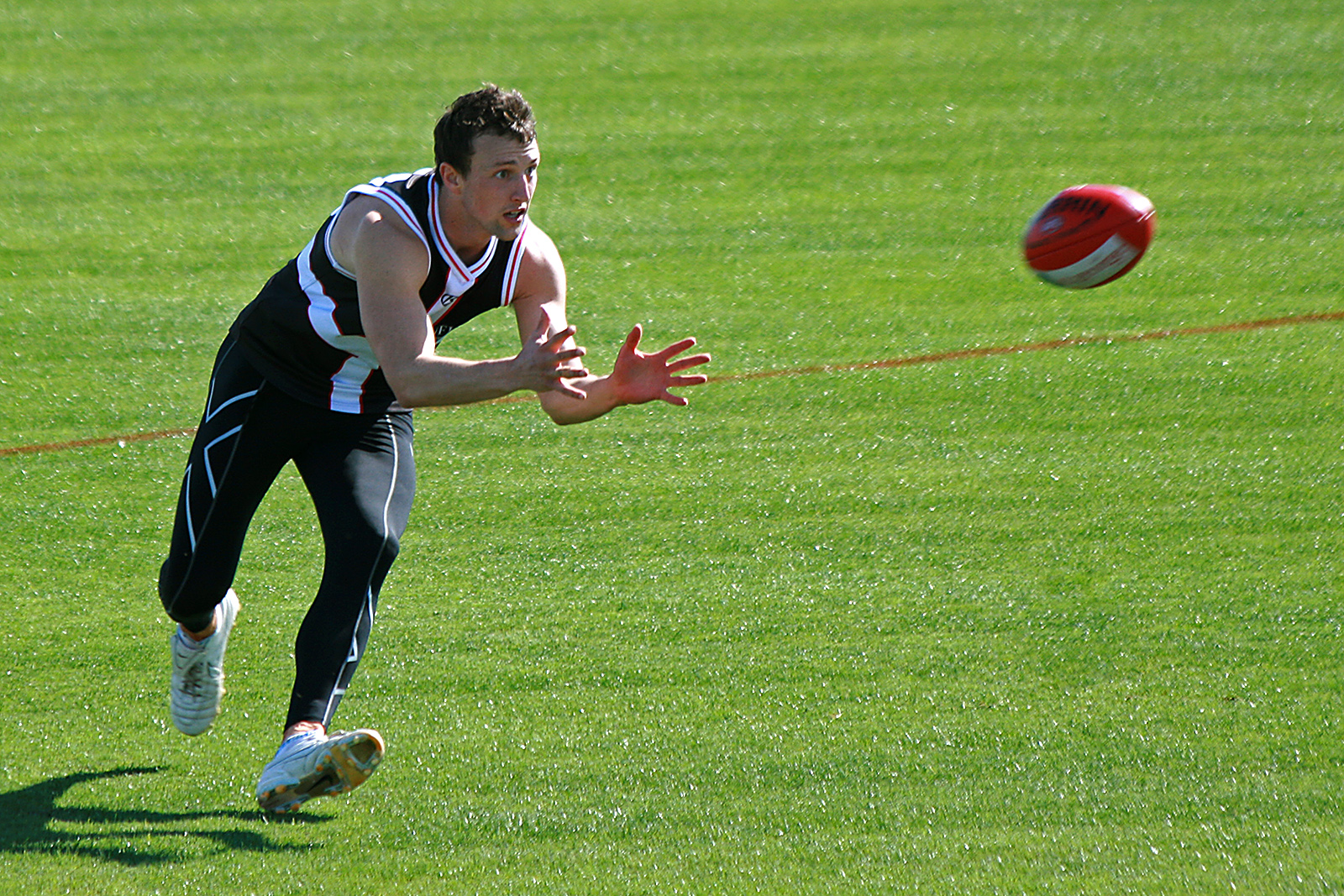
Eddy positions himself for a mark prior to the 2009 AFL Grand Final

=== St Kilda Football Club ===
==== 2006: Drafted ====
Eddy was drafted by St Kilda with the 39th pick in the 2007 AFL Rookie Draft and was on the rookie list until 2008.

==== 2008: Debut ====
Eddy was elevated off the rookie list to play 13 games in 2008. He made his debut in Round 13 and kept his spot in the side for the rest of the season, including 3 finals appearances. He won 12 disposals per game for St Kilda in 2008, but it was his defensive pressure that impressed as he laid the third most tackles of any player during his time in the side.

The midfielder/forward is noted for his endurance, willingness to go hard at the ball and ability to apply forward pressure.

==== 2009: Minor premiership ====
Eddy played 10 games in the 2009 season, with St Kilda qualifying in first position for the finals series, winning the club's third minor premiership.

Eddy played in St Kilda's two finals victories in 2009 but was dropped for the grand final for Sean Dempster.

==== 2010: Grand finalist, delisting and redrafting ====
Eddy played in the 2010 AFL Grand Final in which St Kilda drew with Collingwood and the 2010 AFL Grand Final Replay in which St Kilda were defeated by 56 points. He was delisted by the club at the end of the 2010 premiership season and then redrafted onto the club's rookie list in the 2011 Rookie Draft.

==== 2012: SANFL ====
Eddy joined Woodville-West Torrens in late 2011, signing a two-year contract.

== See also ==
- List of Caulfield Grammar School people
