= Alan Toovey =

Australian rules footballer

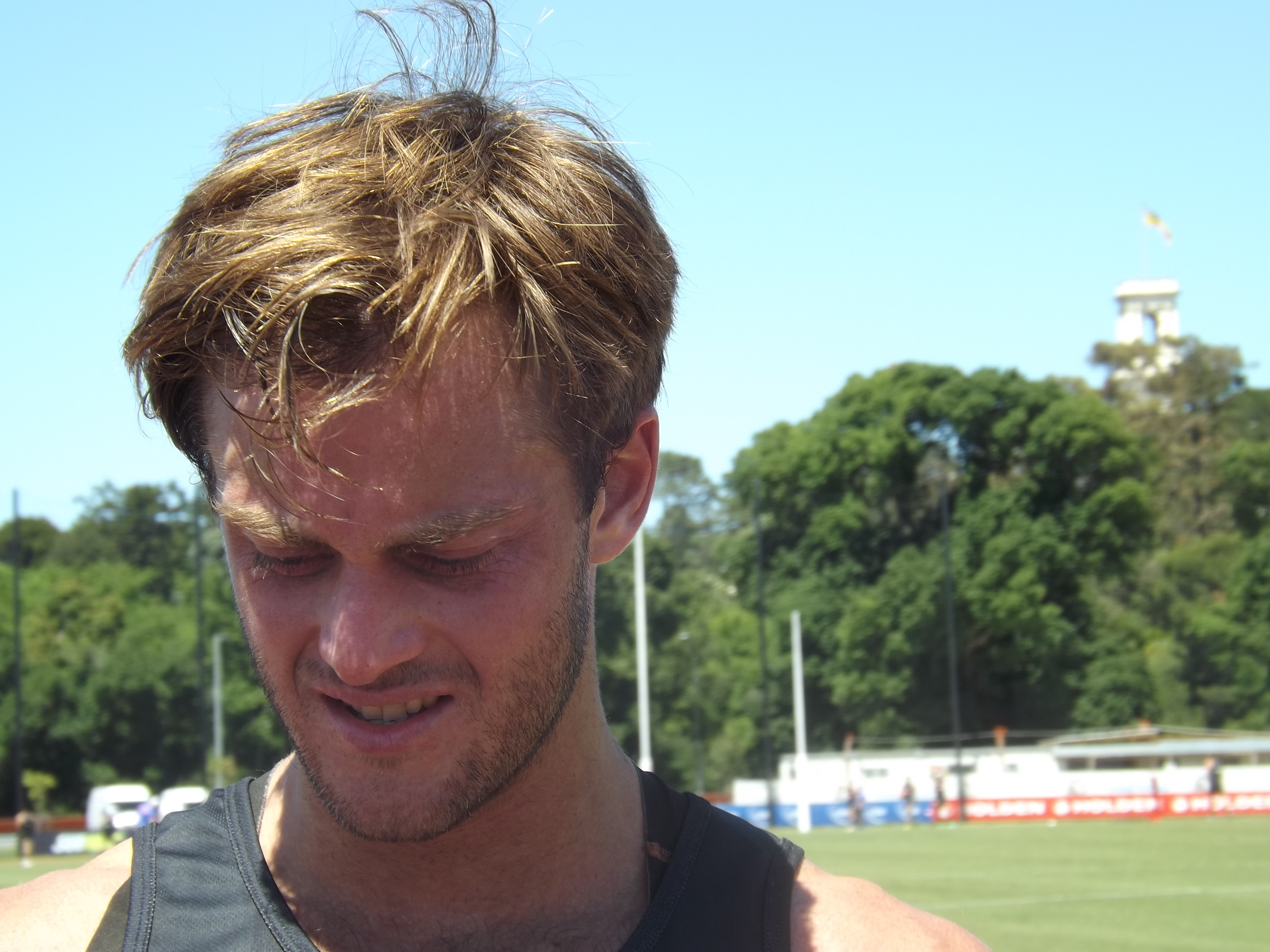
- Toovey with Collingwood in 2014

Personal information
- Full name: Alan Toovey
- Born: 23 March 1987 (age 39); Western Australia
- Original team: Claremont (WAFL)
- Draft: No. 2, 2006 rookie draft, Collingwood
- Height: 189 cm (6 ft 2 in)
- Weight: 89 kg (196 lb)
- Position: Defender

Playing career^{1}
| Years | Club | Games (Goals) |
| 2007–2016 | Collingwood | 159 (9) |
- ^{1} Playing statistics correct to the end of 2016.

Career highlights
- Collingwood premiership player 2010

Alan Toovey (born 23 March 1987) is a former professional Australian rules footballer who played with the Collingwood Football Club in the Australian Football League (AFL).

A speedy left-footed defender, Toovey was initially unlucky not to be drafted to a senior list at the end of 2005, after playing the last seven games of the year for Claremont in the West Australian Football League (WAFL), including the 2005 WAFL Grand Final. He then spent the summer training with Collingwood in the hope of selection in the rookie draft. He was selected with the second pick and played the 2006 season with Williamstown in the VFL. His efforts out of the back pocket earnt him promotion to the senior list at season's end.

Toovey slowly became a cult hero throughout his career. A deep chant of 'Tooves' could be heard from the stands when he had the ball.

He made his AFL debut in round 3 of the 2007 season, scoring three goals against Richmond.

Toovey found himself in and out of the side throughout the 2007 and 2008 seasons, playing a total of 17 games.

In 2009, he won favour with the coaching staff with his relentless attack at the football and player and his never say die attitude. He cemented his place in the senior side, missing only one game in 2009.

2010 was the highlight of Toovey's AFL career. He played every game, becoming a crucial part of the Collingwood backline as the club won its 15th AFL/VFL premiership.

In 2011 Toovey missed a month of football due to a broken finger. At the end of the year, his manager emailed all AFL clubs to inform them that Toovey was out of contract, had rejected the club's initial offer and was looking for a better deal elsewhere. Despite this, he later re-signed with Collingwood for two more years.

During the round five clash against Essendon in 2013, Toovey ruptured his anterior cruciate ligament during an innocuous fall in the last quarter of the game. As a result, Toovey required a knee reconstruction and missed the remainder of the 2013 season. He was selected back into the Collingwood side for the round 1 clash against Fremantle in 2014.

On 22 August 2016, he announced he would retire at the end of the season, along with 2010 premiership teammate Brent Macaffer.

== Statistics ==
Legend
| G | Goals | K | Kicks | D | Disposals | T | Tackles |
| B | Behinds | H | Handballs | M | Marks |

| Season | Team | No. | Games | Totals | | | | | | | Averages (per game) | | | | | | | Votes |
| Season | Team | No. | Games | G | B | K | H | D | M | T | G | B | K | H | D | M | T | Votes |
|---|---|---|---|---|---|---|---|---|---|---|---|---|---|---|---|---|---|---|
| 2007 | Collingwood | 34 | 10 | 4 | 2 | 57 | 49 | 106 | 25 | 27 | 0.4 | 0.2 | 5.7 | 4.9 | 10.6 | 2.5 | 2.7 | 0 |
| 2008 | Collingwood | 34 | 7 | 0 | 0 | 36 | 30 | 66 | 12 | 26 | 0.0 | 0.0 | 5.1 | 4.3 | 9.4 | 1.7 | 3.7 | 0 |
| 2009 | Collingwood | 34 | 24 | 2 | 2 | 164 | 170 | 334 | 61 | 90 | 0.1 | 0.1 | 6.8 | 7.1 | 13.9 | 2.5 | 3.8 | 0 |
| 2010 | Collingwood | 34 | 26 | 2 | 3 | 154 | 187 | 341 | 68 | 124 | 0.1 | 0.1 | 5.9 | 7.2 | 13.1 | 2.6 | 4.8 | 0 |
| 2011 | Collingwood | 34 | 20 | 0 | 2 | 143 | 99 | 242 | 40 | 82 | 0.0 | 0.1 | 7.2 | 5.0 | 12.1 | 2.0 | 4.1 | 0 |
| 2012 | Collingwood | 34 | 22 | 0 | 2 | 157 | 106 | 263 | 60 | 89 | 0.0 | 0.1 | 7.1 | 4.8 | 12.0 | 2.7 | 4.0 | 0 |
| 2013 | Collingwood | 34 | 5 | 0 | 0 | 43 | 15 | 58 | 10 | 17 | 0.0 | 0.0 | 8.6 | 3.0 | 11.6 | 2.0 | 3.4 | 0 |
| 2014 | Collingwood | 34 | 17 | 1 | 0 | 104 | 88 | 192 | 44 | 64 | 0.1 | 0.0 | 6.1 | 5.2 | 11.3 | 2.6 | 3.8 | 0 |
| 2015 | Collingwood | 34 | 20 | 0 | 1 | 109 | 121 | 230 | 47 | 76 | 0.0 | 0.1 | 5.5 | 6.1 | 11.5 | 2.4 | 3.8 | 0 |
| 2016 | Collingwood | 34 | 8 | 0 | 0 | 31 | 57 | 88 | 13 | 24 | 0.0 | 0.0 | 3.9 | 7.1 | 11.0 | 1.6 | 3.0 | 0 |
| Career | | | 159 | 9 | 12 | 998 | 922 | 1920 | 380 | 619 | 0.1 | 0.1 | 6.3 | 5.8 | 12.1 | 2.4 | 3.9 | 0 |
