= Nathan Brown =

Nathan Brown may refer to any of the following people:

== Academia ==
- Nathan Clifford Brown (1856–1941), American ornithologist
- Nathan J. Brown (political scientist) (born 1958), political scientist & academic

== Literature ==
- Nathan Brown (poet) (born 1965), American poet, writer and singer
- Nathan Brown (writer) (born c. 1974), Australian, also editor

== Public administration ==
- Nathan Brown (West Virginia politician) (born 1979), American politician
- Nathan W. Brown (1819–1893), Paymaster-General of the United States Army

== Religion ==
- Nathan Brown (missionary) (1807–1886), American religious leader

== Sport ==
American football

- Nathan Brown (American football) (born 1986), American football quarterback

Australian rules football:

- Nathan Brown (Australian footballer, born 1976), player for Melbourne
- Nathan Brown (Australian footballer, born 1978), player for Richmond and the Western Bulldogs
- Nathan Brown (Australian footballer, born 1988), player for Collingwood and St Kilda

Rugby league

- Nathan Brown (rugby league, born 1973), Australian rugby league player and coach
- Nathan Brown (rugby league, born 1993), Australian rugby league player
