= Jarryd Blair =

Australian rules footballer

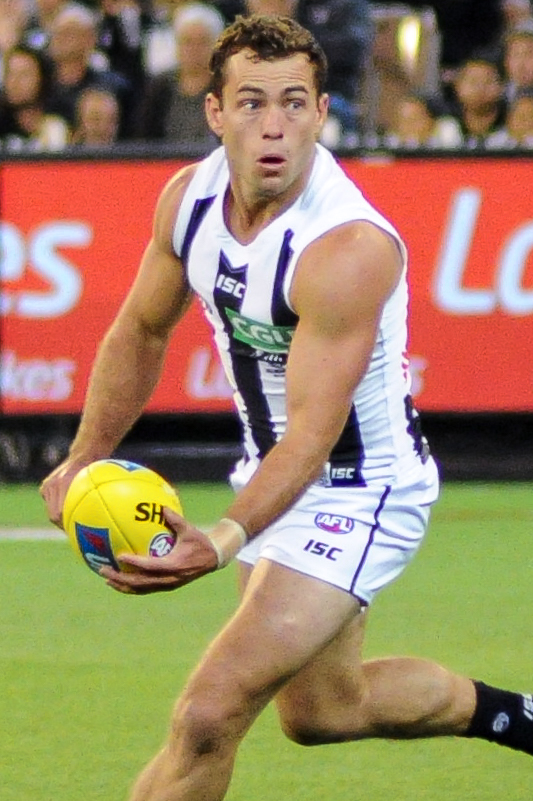
- Blair playing for Collingwood in March 2017

Personal information
- Full name: Jarryd Blair
- Born: 14 April 1990 (age 36); Wonthaggi
- Original team: Wonthaggi / Gippsland Power (TAC Cup)
- Height: 174 cm (5 ft 9 in)
- Weight: 80 kg (176 lb)
- Position: Forward

Playing career^{1}
Years	Club	Games (Goals)
2010–2018	Collingwood	157 (121)
- ^{1} Playing statistics correct to the end of the 2018 season.

Career highlights
- AFL premiership player: 2010; Harry Collier Trophy: 2010; Gavin Brown Award 2013; Morrish Medal: 2008

Jarryd Blair (born 14 April 1990) is a former Australian rules footballer who played for the Collingwood Football Club in the Australian Football League (AFL). Standing at only 174 centimetres, he is a small, pacy wingman/half forward flanker who made his AFL debut in round 14, 2010 against West Coast at Etihad Stadium.

Blair was impressive in his debut. He had 16 disposals (7 kicks and 9 handballs), took 2 marks and had 5 tackles in an 83-point win for Collingwood. The week after against Port Adelaide he continued to impress by kicking 2 goals. In round 20 against Essendon, he was one of the best players in Collingwood's 98 point win. His 27 disposals and 2 goals was rewarded with one vote in the Brownlow Medal.

Blair played in the drawn 2010 AFL Grand Final and was a member of Collingwood's Premiership side a week later in the replay. At 20 years of age Blair was the second-youngest member of Collingwood's 2010 Premiership team after 19-year-old Steele Sidebottom.

In round 3 of 2011, Blair kicked a career-high 5 goals against Carlton. In round 20 that year he kicked four goals against Port Adelaide.

He is the nephew of Morningside premiership coach and former VFL player John Blair. Blair's grandfather John O'Mahony played for Hawthorn between 1951 and 1960.

On 30 October 2018, Blair was delisted by Collingwood.

2019 Jarryd Blair is playing for Port Melbourne in the VFL

== Statistics ==
Statistics are correct to the end of the 2018 season

Legend
G	Goals	K	Kicks	D	Disposals	T	Tackles
B	Behinds	H	Handballs	M	Marks

Season	Team	No.	Games	Totals							Averages (per game)						
Season	Team	No.	Games	G	B	K	H	D	M	T	G	B	K	H	D	M	T
2010	Collingwood	47	12	7	8	84	93	177	31	52	0.6	0.7	7.0	7.8	14.8	2.6	4.3
2011	Collingwood	11	24	26	18	187	189	376	56	94	1.1	0.8	7.8	7.9	15.7	2.3	3.9
2012	Collingwood	11	23	17	12	200	255	455	59	107	0.7	0.5	8.7	11.1	19.8	2.6	4.7
2013	Collingwood	11	22	14	6	156	202	358	58	126	0.6	0.3	7.1	9.2	16.3	2.6	5.7
2014	Collingwood	11	21	12	11	139	184	323	60	112	0.6	0.5	6.6	8.8	15.4	2.9	5.3
2015	Collingwood	11	20	19	9	140	170	310	57	83	1.0	0.5	7.0	8.5	15.5	2.9	4.1
2016	Collingwood	11	21	15	7	142	189	331	59	105	0.7	0.3	6.8	9.0	15.8	2.8	5.0
2017	Collingwood	11	12	11	7	50	94	144	21	49	0.9	0.6	4.2	7.8	12.0	1.8	4.1
2018	Collingwood	11	2	0	0	16	20	36	7	8	0.0	0.0	8.0	10.0	18.0	3.5	4.0
Career			157	121	78	1114	1396	2510	408	736	0.8	0.5	7.1	8.9	16.0	2.6	4.7
