= Ray Chamberlain (umpire) =

Australian rules football field umpire

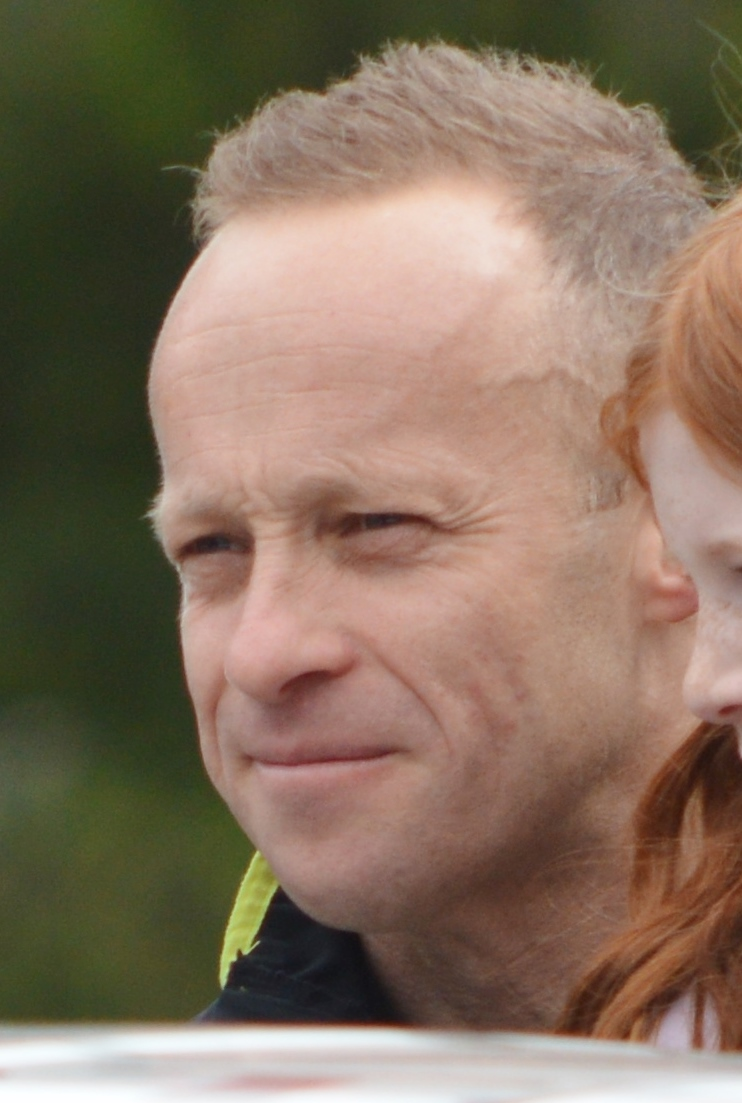
- Chamberlain in the 2019 AFL Grand Final Parade

Personal information
- Full name: Ray Chamberlain
- Nickname: Razor Ray
- Born: 5 September 1976 (age 50); Australian Capital Territory

Umpiring career
Years	League	Role	Games
2000–2004	VFL		
2004–2024	AFL	Field Umpire	389

Career highlights
- VFL Debut 2000; AFL Debut 2004; Grand Final 2010; Grand Final 2010 Replay; Grand Final 2019

Ray Chamberlain (born 5 September 1976), better known as Razor Ray, is a former Australian rules football field umpire in the Australian Football League.

Chamberlain was born and grew up in the Australian Capital Territory and umpired his first Australian rules game as a teenager. He was offered an umpiring contract by the VFL in 2000 and promptly moved to Victoria, where he umpired in the VFL for four years before being offered an AFL umpiring contract. Chamberlain is noted for his sense of humour, often cracking jokes on the field. Chamberlain has been criticised by individuals such as coach of Geelong Chris Scott for a perceived lack of ability to perform a centre bounce, claims that Chamberlain has pushed back against.

Chamberlain was selected to officiate in his first grand final on 25 September 2010, the drawn Grand Final between Collingwood and St Kilda. Nine years later, he was selected again to officiate the 2019 AFL Grand Final.

He formerly taught physical education at Victorian Public High School, Mordialloc College, where he was also a year-level coordinator.

Inaugural inductee to University of Canberra Sport Walk of Fame in 2022.
