= John O'Mahony (Australian footballer) =

Australian rules footballer

Personal information
- Full name: John O'Mahony
- Born: 7 December 1931
- Original team: Camberwell Juniors
- Debut: Round 14, 1951, Hawthorn vs. St Kilda, at Junction Oval
- Height: 179 cm (5 ft 10 in)
- Weight: 70 kg (154 lb)
- Position: Halfback / Centre

Playing career^{1}
Years	Club	Games (Goals)
1951–1960	Hawthorn	112 (28)
- ^{1} Playing statistics correct to the end of 1960.

Career highlights
- Hawthorn Hall of Fame

John O'Mahony (born 7 December 1931) was a former Australian rules footballer who played with Hawthorn in the Victorian Football League (VFL).

== VFL career ==
O'Mahony was recruited from the Camberwell Juniors in 1950, winning the Best and Fairest in the reserves in his first season. Making his debut in the senior side in 1951, initially as a half-back, before establishing himself in the centre, where he proved to be an creative and clever player. O’Mahony was an unselfish footballer and his team play was reflected in his second-place finish in the Best and Fairest in 1955, and third-place in 1956. He suffered a punctured lung early in 1957 and missed the rest of the season. He retired in 1960 after playing over 100 games for the club.

== Post playing ==
He stayed with the club after retirement, first serving as an assistant coach, and later as the chairman of selectors. In 1996 he took the role as treasurer in the anti-merger group Operation Fightback

== Family ==
His grandson, Jarryd Blair, would later play 157 games for Collingwood.

== Honours and achievements ==
Individual

- Hawthorn Hall of Fame
- Hawthorn life member
