= Leon Davis (footballer) =

Australian rules footballer, born 1981

Personal information
- Full name: Leon Davis
- Nickname: Neon Leon
- Born: 17 June 1981 (age 45); Western Australia
- Original team: Railways (AFA)
- Draft: 34th pick, 1999 National draft Collingwood
- Height: 177 cm (5 ft 10 in)
- Weight: 80 kg (176 lb)
- Position: Forward / Defender

Club information
- Current club: Heywood FNC

Playing career^{1}
Years	Club	Games (Goals)
2000–2011	Collingwood	225 (270)

Representative team honours
Years	Team	Games (Goals)
2008	Dream Team	1 (3)
- ^{1} Playing statistics correct to the end of 2011.

Career highlights
- Collingwood Premiership player: 2010; 2× All-Australian team: 2009, 2011; AFL Goal of the Year: 2008

Leon Davis (born 17 June 1981) is a former Australian rules footballer who played with the Collingwood Football Club in the Australian Football League (AFL).

Originally from Northam, Western Australia, Davis played for Perth before being drafted by Collingwood in the 1999 National draft. He made his senior debut for the club in 2000, and went on to play in grand final losses in 2002 and 2003. Playing mainly as a small forward, Davis was selected in the All-Australian team in 2009, having won the Goal of the Year award the previous season.

He was awarded a premiership medallion in 2010, having played in the drawn 2010 AFL Grand Final before being dropped for the replay that Collingwood won. In 2011, Davis switched to a role as a rebounding defender, and he was again named in the All-Australian team. He left the club at the conclusion of the 2011 season to return to play for Perth in the WAFL. Throughout his career, Davis became a cult figure of sorts amongst Collingwood supporters, and he was widely known by the nickname "Neon Leon" due to his exciting style of play, although he did not particularly like the nickname himself.

== Background and junior career ==
Davis, of Aboriginal heritage, played his junior football for the Railways Football Club in the Avon Football Association (AFA) and the Perth Football Club in the West Australian Football League. He was drafted to the Australian Football League by the Collingwood Football Club in the 1999 AFL National draft with a second-round selection (No. 34 overall).

== AFL career ==
Davis won regular selection at Collingwood early in his career, playing almost forty games in his first two seasons. Playing as a small forward, Davis averaged almost a goal a game over this time. He played 23 matches and kicked 31 goals during the 2002 season, and he played in Collingwood's 2002 grand final loss against the Brisbane Lions, although he failed to register a possession in the match.

Davis went through a form slump late in the 2003 season, and he missed the second half of the season (although he returned for the preliminary final), but he returned to form in 2004, playing 19 games for 23 goals. In 2005, Davis played his 100th game, becoming the first Aboriginal player to do so for the Collingwood Football Club. After six years playing exclusively as a small forward, Davis moved further up the field in 2007, playing some time in the midfield; however, he still managed 29 goals in the forward-line.

In 2008, Davis came 4th in the Copeland Trophy, Collingwood's best and fairest award, and represented the Dream Team in the AFL Hall of Fame Tribute Match. Davis also won the AFL's Goal of the Year for a solo effort in Round 22 against Fremantle: he tackled and dispossessed Des Headland on the half-forward flank, paddled and gathered the ball near the boundary line, ran inside 50 on the boundary line, and hit a low and hard kick from a tight angle for a goal.

Davis continued to divide his time between midfield and forward line, and he had a very strong year in 2009, earning All-Australian selection as a forward pocket for the season. His form waned slightly during the 2010 season. Davis played all but one match during the home-and-away season, but he was injured for Collingwood's preliminary final. He returned for the drawn grand final, kicking a vital goal in the final quarter but otherwise having a quiet game, and was dropped for Collingwood's win in the grand final replay the following week. Despite not playing in the replay, he is considered a premiership player by the AFL.

In 2011, Davis was moved into the backline. He was very successful in this role, and he received his second career selection in the All-Australian team and a fifth placing in the Copeland Trophy.

Davis left Collingwood at the end of 2011. Davis has not confirmed the exact reason for his departure, but it is known that he was offered a 30% pay cut at the end of 2011, despite his All-Australian season, and it is known that he had previously expressed a desire to return with his family to Perth. He nominated for the draft but was not selected, and went on to sign a two-year contract to play for his former WAFL side, Perth, in 2012 and 2013.

Davis was a specialist at the banana kick shot at goal, which has earned him several nominations for "Goal of the Year", although his Goal of the Year victory in 2008 was not from such a kick. Whether rightly or wrongly, Davis also gained an undesirable reputation for not being able to perform in finals, particularly grand finals; despite being a premiership player in 2010, Davis played in four grand finals for three losses and a draw throughout his career. In the 2011 grand final against Geelong, he gave Collingwood a lot of run of half-back and tackled well. He also scored a mercurial goal in the final quarter of the drawn 2010 Grand Final.

== Statistics ==
Legend
G	Goals	K	Kicks	D	Disposals	T	Tackles
B	Behinds	H	Handballs	M	Marks

Season	Team	No.	Games	Totals							Averages (per game)							Votes
Season	Team	No.	Games	G	B	K	H	D	M	T	G	B	K	H	D	M	T	Votes
2000	Collingwood	40	15	11	8	78	35	113	20	24	0.7	0.5	5.2	2.3	7.5	1.3	1.6	0
2001	Collingwood	1	18	21	12	106	25	131	32	16	1.2	0.7	5.9	1.4	7.3	1.8	0.9	0
2002	Collingwood	1	23	31	19	191	48	239	55	53	1.4	0.8	8.3	2.1	10.4	2.4	2.3	0
2003	Collingwood	1	13	18	11	85	29	114	23	18	1.4	0.8	6.5	2.2	8.8	1.8	1.4	0
2004	Collingwood	1	19	23	13	162	45	207	54	41	1.2	0.7	8.5	2.4	10.9	2.8	2.2	3
2005	Collingwood	1	12	11	11	119	50	169	46	20	0.9	0.9	9.9	4.2	14.1	3.8	1.7	0
2006	Collingwood	1	15	23	14	150	51	201	48	24	1.5	0.9	10.0	3.4	13.4	3.2	1.6	2
2007	Collingwood	1	24	31	21	250	50	300	60	103	1.3	0.9	10.4	2.1	12.5	2.5	4.3	0
2008	Collingwood	1	22	32	21	297	85	382	101	73	1.5	1.0	13.5	3.9	17.4	4.6	3.3	6
2009	Collingwood	1	23	35	24	351	120	471	109	96	1.5	1.0	15.3	5.2	20.5	4.7	4.2	10
2010	Collingwood	1	20	27	26	169	74	243	57	73	1.4	1.3	8.5	3.7	12.2	2.9	3.7	2
2011	Collingwood	1	21	7	8	339	123	462	89	78	0.3	0.4	16.1	5.9	22.0	4.2	3.7	4
Career			225	270	188	2297	735	3032	694	619	1.2	0.8	10.2	3.3	13.5	3.1	2.8	27

== Controversy ==
Davis was involved in a controversial incident involving a racial slur in 2005, when 3AW radio commentator Rex Hunt called Davis 'as black as a dog' during the call against Essendon midway through the season. Hunt made the comment when he trailed off while saying "Neon Leon hasn't lit up tonight; he's as black as a dog's guts in the night", to describe Davis' poor form in that match in terms of a neon lights metaphor; other members of the commentary team had been using different neon lights metaphors in the same context. Hunt's apology to Davis was initially rejected, and it was only accepted later in the week after a face-to-face meeting.
