= Brent Macaffer =

Australian rules footballer

Personal information
- Full name: Brent Macaffer
- Born: 29 February 1988 (age 38); Victoria
- Original team: Gippsland Power (TAC Cup)
- Draft: No. 26, 2007 rookie draft
- Debut: Round 5, 2009, Collingwood vs. Essendon, at MCG
- Height: 187 cm (6 ft 2 in)
- Weight: 89 kg (196 lb)
- Position: Forward

Playing career^{1}
Years	Club	Games (Goals)
2009–2016	Collingwood	77 (33)
- ^{1} Playing statistics correct to the end of 2016.

Career highlights
- Joseph Wren Memorial Trophy 2008, 2016; Collingwood premiership player 2010

Brent Macaffer (born 29 February 1988) is a former professional Australian rules footballer who played for the Collingwood Football Club in the Australian Football League (AFL). He was recruited in the 2006 AFL draft.

Macaffer is one of a string of players to have been recruited by Collingwood from Gippsland. Despite his small stature, Macaffer led the TAC Cup U/18 goalkicking in 2006, and was named at full forward in the Team of the Year. Macaffer has good pace and can push up the ground to play in different positions.

Macaffer won the Joseph Wren Award for Best Collingwood VFL player in 2008, along with former Collingwood player Justin Crow.

Macaffer switched his guernsey to number three at the end of the 2012 season as tribute to his late friend and former teammate John McCarthy who died during the 2012 offseason.

In the 2013 AFL season Macaffer was utilised as more of a tagger/inside mid, a notable performance was keeping St Kilda star Nick Dal Santo to 16 disposals at 44% efficiency in Round 6. At the end of the 2013 season, Champion Data rated the AFL's top 18 taggers and Macaffer was rated the 3rd best in the league behind Ryan Crowley and Ed Curnow. Macaffer had won 14/16 of his roles which included some of the best Midfielders in the game with the likes of Nick Dal Santo, David Mundy, Joel Selwood, Josh P. Kennedy, Pearce Hanley, Dyson Heppell, Kieren Jack, Andrew Gaff, Daniel Wells, Travis Boak, plus others. Nathan Buckley moving Macaffer into the middle as a tagger reinvented him from the defensive forward role (Which he still played from time to time) and he cemented himself in the strong Collingwood midfield with the likes of Dane Swan, Scott Pendlebury, Dayne Beams, Luke Ball and Steele Sidebottom and played a full season for the first time since Collingwood's Premiership Season in 2010.

On 22 August 2016, he announced he would retire at the end of the season, along with 2010 premiership team-mate Alan Toovey. Macaffer was awarded for his consistent season at VFL level with the Joseph Wren Memorial Trophy and for his clubmanship with the Darren Millane Award.

In 2018 Brent played for Eltham in the local Northern Football League. He kicked 12 goals in 19 games and was awarded the club's best and fairest award.

On 13 February 2019 Brent was honoured by being awarded Collingwood life membership.

== Statistics ==
Legend
G	Goals	K	Kicks	D	Disposals	T	Tackles
B	Behinds	H	Handballs	M	Marks

Season	Team	No.	Games	Totals							Averages (per game)						
Season	Team	No.	Games	G	B	K	H	D	M	T	G	B	K	H	D	M	T
2009	Collingwood	30	5	4	4	31	28	59	19	23	0.8	0.8	6.2	5.6	11.8	3.8	4.6
2010	Collingwood	30	21	16	14	173	149	322	88	98	0.8	0.7	8.2	7.1	15.3	4.2	4.7
2011	Collingwood	30	4	1	1	31	16	47	14	9	0.3	0.3	7.8	4.0	11.8	3.5	2.3
2012	Collingwood	30	0	—	—	—	—	—	—	—	—	—	—	—	—	—	—
2013	Collingwood	3	22	7	4	201	106	307	99	85	0.3	0.2	9.1	4.8	14.0	4.5	3.9
2014	Collingwood	3	21	4	5	176	108	284	80	86	0.2	0.2	8.4	5.1	13.5	3.8	4.1
2015	Collingwood	3	0	—	—	—	—	—	—	—	—	—	—	—	—	—	—
2016	Collingwood	3	4	1	1	17	16	33	4	15	0.3	0.3	4.3	4.0	8.3	1.0	3.8
Career			77	33	29	629	423	1052	304	316	0.4	0.4	8.2	5.5	13.7	4.0	4.1
