= 2010 AFL Grand Final =

Drawn AFL Grand Final played by Collingwood and St Kilda

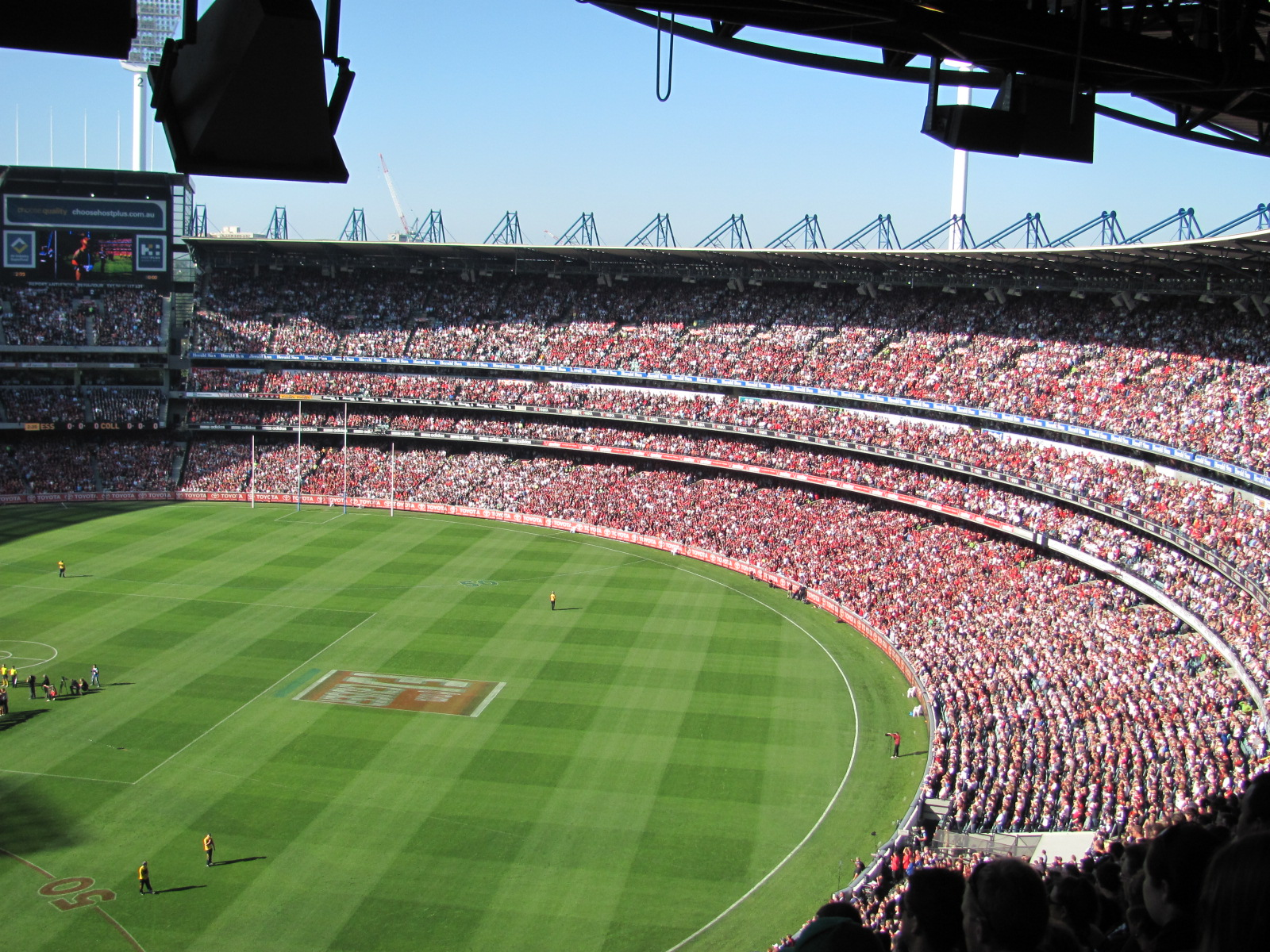
- The Melbourne Cricket Ground (pictured), where the 2010 AFL Grand Final was played.

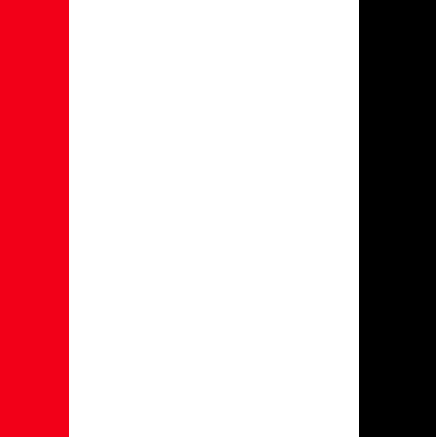
Collingwood	St Kilda
9.14 (68)	10.8 (68)
	1	2	3	4
COL	4.2 (26)	7.8 (50)	7.13 (55)	9.14 (68)
STK	3.2 (20)	4.2 (26)	7.5 (47)	10.8 (68)
- Date: 25 September 2010
- Stadium: Melbourne Cricket Ground
- Attendance: 100,016
- Favourite: Collingwood
- Umpires: Ray Chamberlain, Brett Rosebury, Shaun Ryan

Ceremonies
- Pre-match entertainment: INXS, Matt Hetherington (for Collingwood) and Paris Wells (for St Kilda)
- National anthem: Cam Henderson and Taylor Henderson

Accolades
- Norm Smith Medallist: Lenny Hayes (St Kilda)

Broadcast in Australia
- Network: Seven Network
- Commentators: Bruce McAvaney (host); Dennis Cometti (commentator); Leigh Matthews (expert commentator); Tom Harley (expert commentator); Matthew Richardson (boundary rider); Tim Watson (boundary rider)

The 2010 AFL Grand Final was a series of two Australian rules football matches between the Collingwood Football Club and the St Kilda Football Club. They are considered the 114th and 115th grand finals of the Australian Football League (formerly the Victorian Football League),^{Note 1} and were staged to determine the premiers for the 2010 AFL season. The premiership is usually decided by a single match; however, as the first grand final ended in a draw, a grand final replay was played the following week and was won by Collingwood.

Both grand finals were held at the Melbourne Cricket Ground in Melbourne. The first was held on 25 September 2010. The game was attended by 100,016 spectators. The match ended in a draw, with both teams scoring 68 points. This was the third draw for a grand final in the history of the VFL/AFL, with the previous two occurring in 1948 and 1977.

The premiership was decided by a full replay on 2 October 2010. It was attended by 93,853 people. Collingwood defeated St Kilda by 56 points, marking Collingwood's fifteenth VFL/AFL premiership victory and their first since 1990. It was the last grand final to be replayed prior to the introduction of extra time.

== Background ==
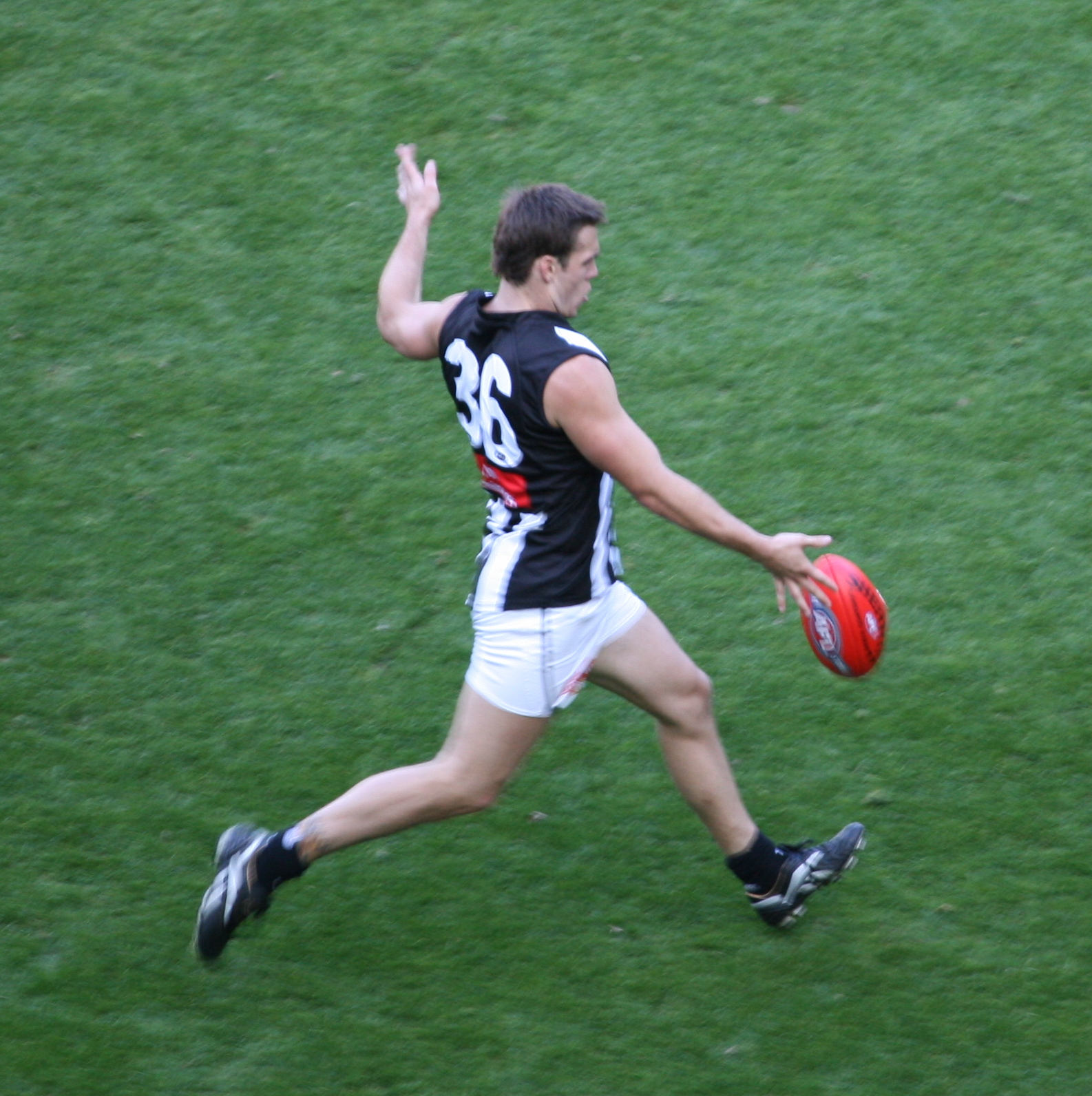
Leigh Matthews Trophy winner Dane Swan of Collingwood, the pre-match favourite to win the Norm Smith Medal.

Collingwood entered the 2010 season after having lost its preliminary final in 2009 against eventual premiers Geelong. Collingwood was the best performed side of the home and away season, finishing with a record of 17–4–1 and winning its first minor premiership since 1977 and its first McClelland Trophy since 1970. Collingwood progressed to the grand final after comfortable victories in the qualifying final against the Western Bulldogs by 62 points, and then against Geelong in the preliminary final by 41 points.

St Kilda entered the season after having won the 2009 minor premiership with the club's best ever home and away record of 20–2, but losing the grand final to Geelong by two goals. After winning the first four games of the season, the Saints hit a form slump coinciding with a serious hamstring injury to captain Nick Riewoldt. They would recover to win seven games in a row before Riewoldt's return, and finished third on the ladder with a record of 15–6–1. They overcame a heavily favoured Geelong team by four points in their qualifying final, and had a comfortable 24-point win over the Western Bulldogs in the preliminary final to advance to the grand final.

It was the first grand final between two Melbourne-based sides since the 2000 grand final.^{Note 2} Collingwood was the strong favourite to win, with major bookmakers offering around A$1.40 to A$1.45 for a Collingwood victory at the start of the game.

Collingwood and St Kilda met twice during the 2010 home-and-away season, each team winning once. St Kilda won in round 3 at Etihad Stadium, 10.9 (69) to an inaccurate 4.17 (41), although Riewoldt was badly injured during the match. In round 16 at the MCG, Collingwood was a comfortable winner over St Kilda by the score 15.10 (100) versus 6.16 (52). The teams also met in the first round of the pre-season competition which St Kilda won by 1 point.

They were a good side at the beginning (of the year) but they've just got stronger than ever...They're the best Collingwood team since the 1920s and 1930s.

— Ron Barassi, AFL Hall of Fame member and AFL Legend

The first final marked the 41st time Collingwood had contested the VFL/AFL grand final, and the first time since the club lost back-to-back grand finals in 2002 and 2003. The club was attempting to win its fifteenth VFL/AFL premiership, and its first since 1990. It was St Kilda's seventh grand final appearance, and its second in a row after the loss in 2009. St Kilda was attempting to win its second premiership, the only previous premiership coming in 1966.

The matches were the second and third grand finals contested by the two clubs. The only previous encounter was the 1966 grand final in which St Kilda won its only premiership, winning by a single point 10.14 (74) to 10.13 (73). They had met in a total of nine finals, of which St Kilda had won six, including the last five in a row, dating back to the 1966 grand final.^{Note 3} Between them, Collingwood and St Kilda fielded only three players who had previously won a premiership: Darren Jolly (Collingwood), Adam Schneider and Sean Dempster (both St Kilda)—all three played in Sydney's 2005 premiership team five years earlier.

The matches were the first occasion when a clash guernsey was worn in a grand final since their gradual introduction in the 1990s and 2000s. St Kilda, being the lower-ranked team on the ladder, wore its predominantly white clash guernsey due to its home guernsey clashing with Collingwood, who began wearing a predominantly black home guernsey in 2001.

== Media coverage ==
The 2010 decider was telecast nationwide by the Seven Network, on their main channel as well as the new high-definition (HD) digital channel 7mate. The match was also broadcast for the first time in 3D. The network had only broadcast the match following an agreement that would see them, along with Network Ten (which had been contracted under the current deal to telecast the event in 2007, 2009 and 2011), share the rights to the match every year, with the other network broadcasting the pre-season grand final and the Brownlow Medal presentation that year as well. Seven also televised the AFL grand final replay, on 2 October, albeit not in 3D nor in high-definition, as the equipment was being loaned in Sydney for the NRL Grand Final.

The Seven Network also made use of the Skycam for the first time in an AFL grand final. The camera had previously been trialled by the Nine Network during its coverage of Friday Night Football in 2004, as well as the Rugby League State of Origin.

According to The Sydney Morning Herald, 3.7 million people tuned into their TV to watch the drawn grand final, while a slightly smaller audience of 3.6 million tuned to watch the replay. However, 5.7 million witnessed the last 5 minutes of the replay despite an unassailable Collingwood lead, up from 5.6 million the previous week.

Aside from television, the grand final was also broadcast by a number of radio stations. Due to Melbourne still being the heartland of Australian rules football, a higher number of radio stations broadcast locally into Melbourne, although almost all stations had their broadcast syndicated by regional stations nationwide. Radio broadcasters included Triple M, SEN 1116, 3AW, 774 ABC Melbourne, 95.5 K-Rock, NIRS, FiveAA, 6PR and Crocmedia.

== Pre-match entertainment ==
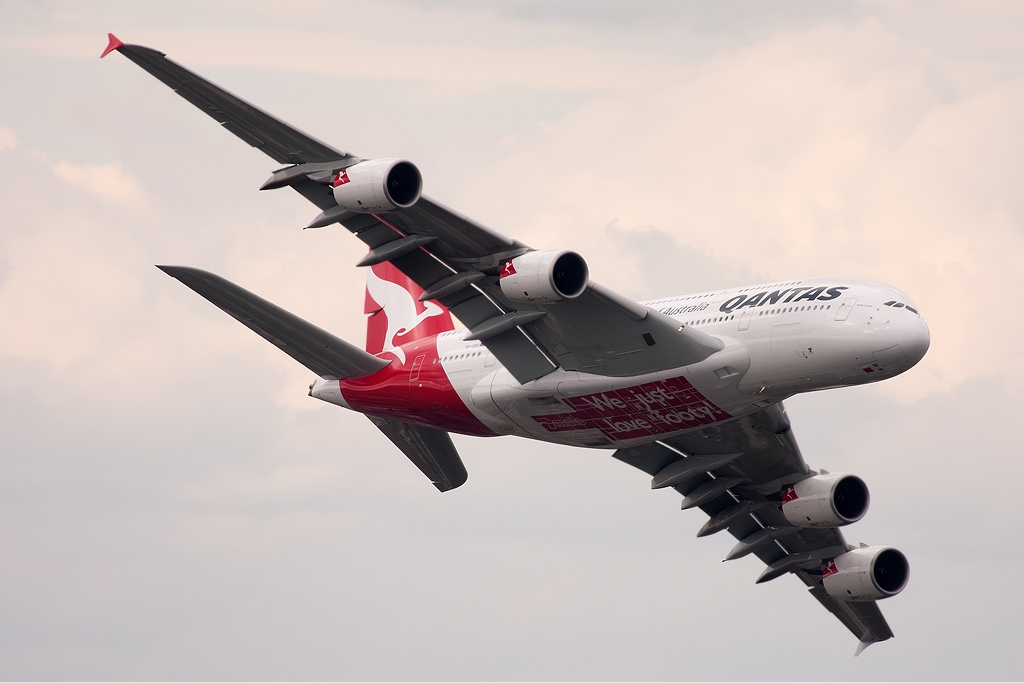
A Qantas Airbus A380 flies over the MCG on grand final day.

Prior to the match, entertainment was provided by INXS, who performed "Suicide Blonde", "New Sensation" and "Kick". This was followed by the Melbourne Symphony Orchestra, who performed orchestral arrangements of the Collingwood and St Kilda theme songs. Lyrics for the two songs were performed by Matt Hetherington (for Collingwood) and Paris Wells (for St Kilda).

For the grand final replay, Lionel Richie was announced to perform the pre-match, as well as the post-match, entertainment. The American said, "It is a great honour to be invited to perform at such an historic event in Australian football...I am incredibly fortunate to have been available for this once-in-a-lifetime experience to share my music with my fans."

Following Richie's performance, the team theme songs were performed as saxophone solos by Joe Camilleri (for Collingwood) and Wilbur Wilde (for St Kilda). For the replay, in place of the traditional around-the-ground parade of 2010 AFL retirees and medalists, famous members of the Collingwood and St Kilda football clubs were presented, including participants from the memorable 1966 VFL grand final.

== Grand final, 25 September 2010 ==
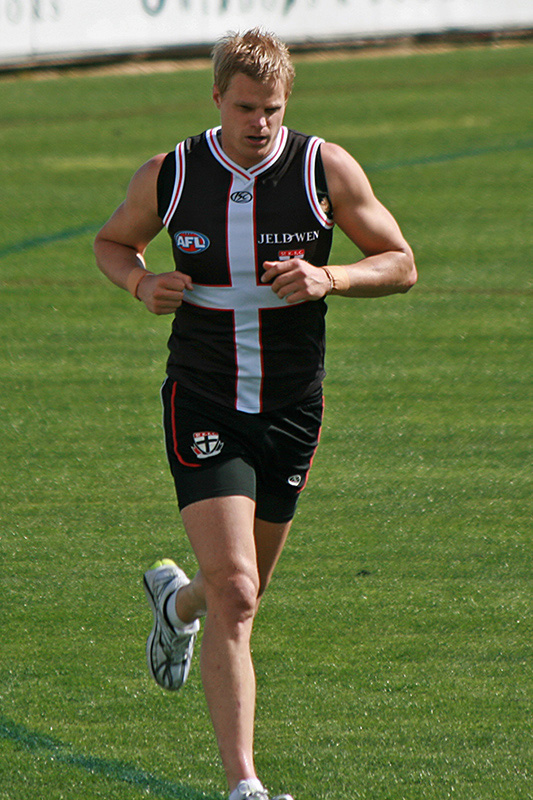
Nick Riewoldt, captain of St Kilda.

The match was played under dry conditions. Rain was forecast towards the end of the match, but did not arrive until after the match had finished.

=== First quarter ===
Collingwood scored the first goal only twenty seconds into the game, winning the first clearance and eventually getting the ball to Jolly to score from five metres out. Stephen Milne scored St Kilda's opening goal in the 8th minute. Collingwood then scored three goals in six minutes from Jarryd Blair, Alan Didak and Dale Thomas to open up a twenty-point lead. After the 17th minute, St Kilda was able to hold Collingwood scoreless, with goals to Riewoldt and Schneider bringing the margin back to six points at quarter time.

Generally, Collingwood had the better of the play early in the first quarter, attacking primarily through rebounds and turnovers. St Kilda won the clearances 12–6 throughout the quarter, and it was through that clearance work that St Kilda was able to build their late-quarter recovery. Lenny Hayes was instrumental in St Kilda's clearance work, acting as third-man-up in the ruck contests and collecting 10 disposals. All of the key statistics (contested possessions, inside-50s, tackles) except for clearances were fairly even through the quarter.

=== Second quarter ===
Collingwood dominated the second quarter. They won the clearances 16–6, and won the inside-50s 21–5, giving St Kilda almost no opportunity to score. Overall, Collingwood managed 10 shots at goal, but took many from long distance, which affected their overall accuracy: their total score for the quarter was 3.6 (24) with one out on the full. Goals were scored by Travis Cloke in the 3rd minute, Brent Macaffer in the 18th minute (from a holding the ball free kick against Robert Eddy and subsequent 50-metre penalty against Farren Ray) and Harry O'Brien in the 26th minute. Of their remaining shots, three fell short and were touched or rushed for behinds, while Cloke missed two relatively easy shots—one from a 25-metre set shot directly in front and one from a snap shot 30 metres out—in the final two minutes of the quarter. So dominant was Collingwood in the second quarter that St Kilda managed only two shots on goal, both set shots from outside 50 metres: one goal to Justin Koschitzke in the 12th minute, and one from Brett Peake in the 21st minute which fell short and was rebounded.

Collingwood entered half time with a 24-point lead. Dane Swan was instrumental at stoppages in the second quarter, while Thomas and captain Nick Maxwell were both crucial at forcing rebounds.

=== Third quarter ===
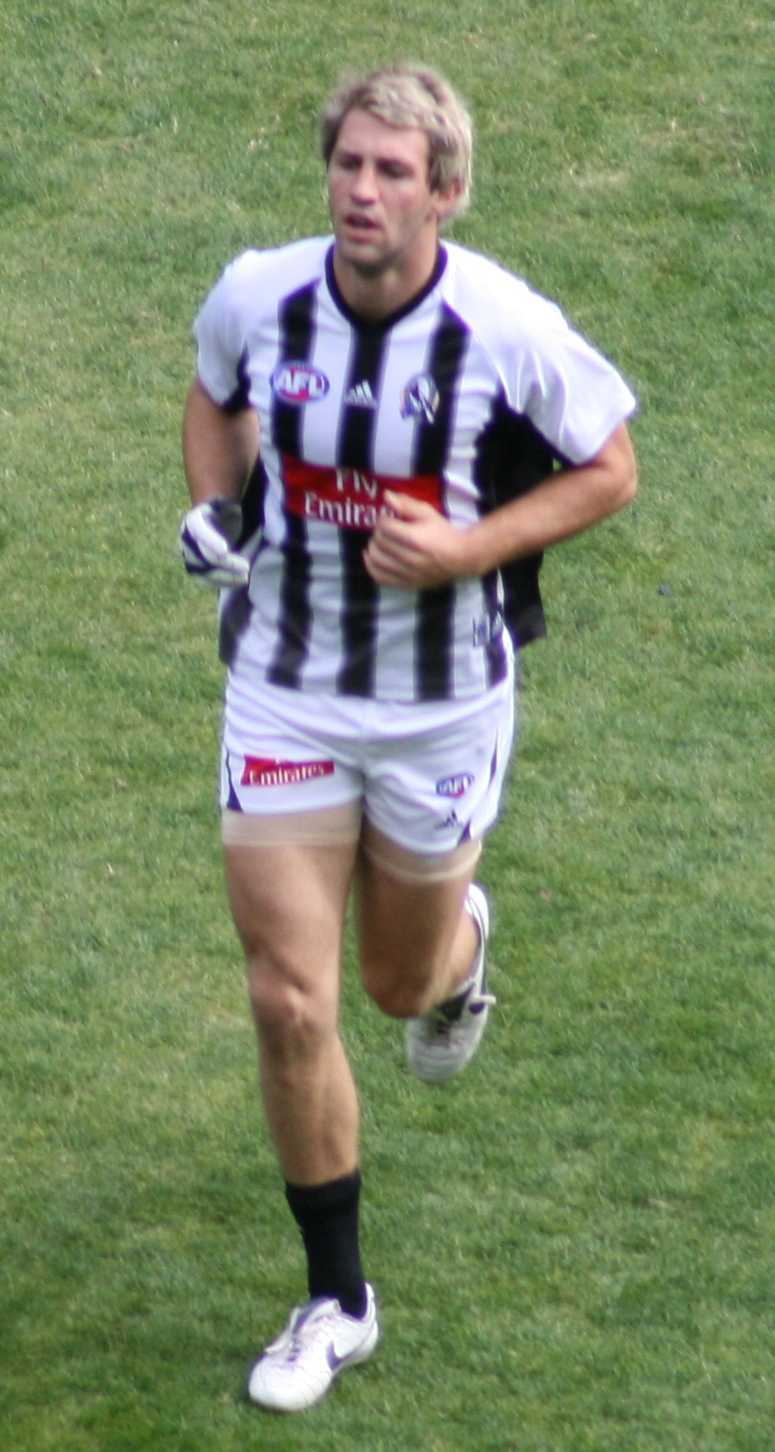
Travis Cloke was the only multiple goal kicker for Collingwood.

St Kilda began to win clearances again, and after both teams mustered rushed behinds, Riewoldt scored the first goal of the quarter in the 5th minute from a coast-to-coast play. Midway through the quarter, ruckman Michael Gardiner left the field injured, leaving St Kilda (who had omitted back-up ruckman Ben McEvoy for the game) without a recognised ruckman. Collingwood had long-range shots at goal by Cloke and Chris Dawes fall short and rushed for behinds in the middle stages of the quarter, but could not score a goal. The Saints kicked two goals in five minutes through Brendon Goddard and Sam Gilbert to close the gap to seven points in the 22nd minute. Thomas had a good chance to score a goal late in the quarter, but missed with a wild snap shot under little pressure. Collingwood took an eight-point lead into three-quarter time.

After Collingwood's complete dominance of the second quarter, the third quarter was much more closely contested. The teams were even in both clearances and contested disposals, and both managed six shots on goal. In St Kilda's case, their six shots yielded 3.3 (21), while in Collingwood's case, they yielded only 0.5 (5)—including hitting the post once, two falling short and then getting touched through for behinds, and one falling short and being marked by an opponent for no score. Hayes and Goddard were again prominent at the clearances, with both playing at various times as the third man up in ruck contests. Part-time ruckman Jason Blake assumed much of the ruck responsibility following Gardiner's injury.

=== Fourth quarter ===
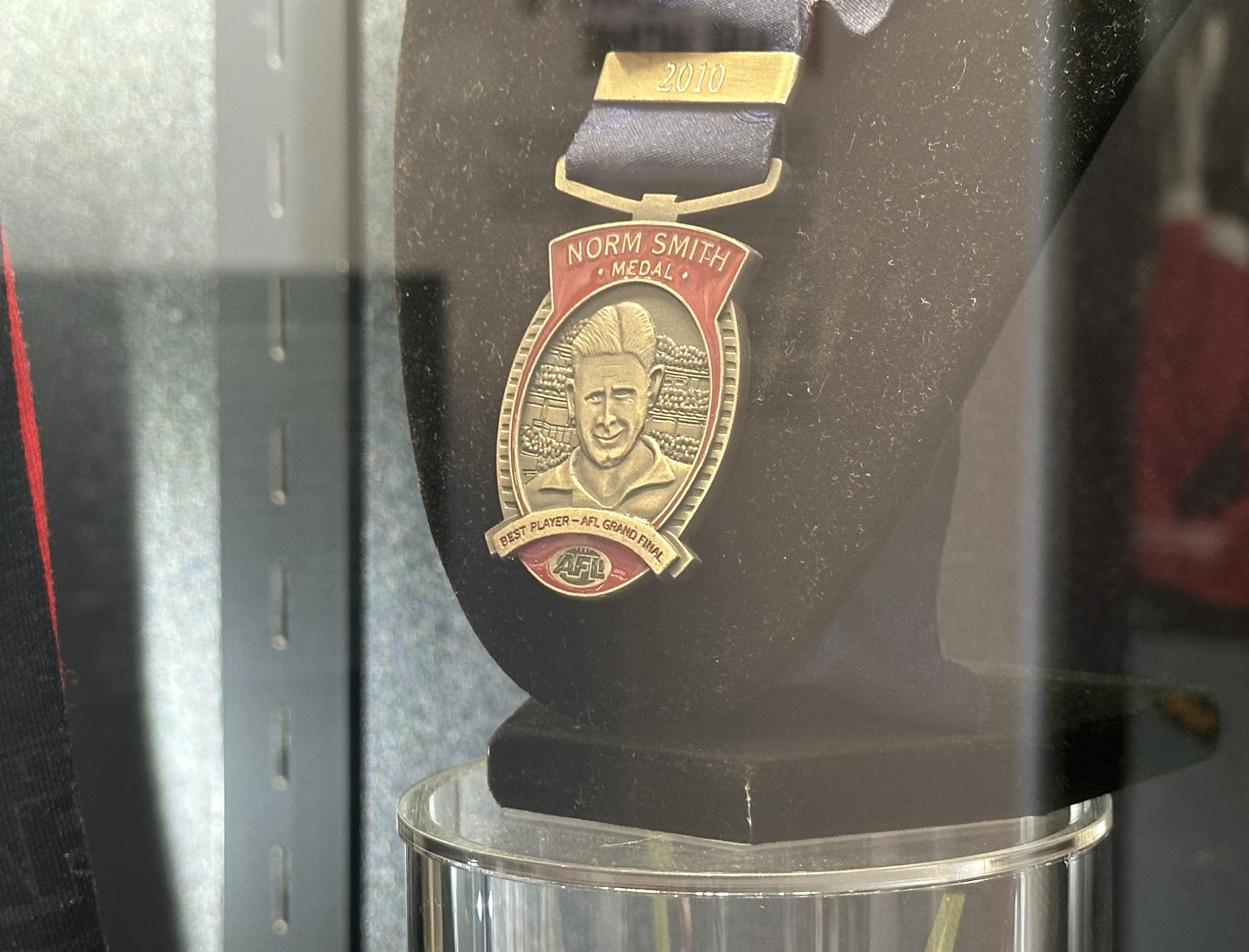
The Norm Smith Medal won by Lenny Hayes, pictured on display at Moorabbin Oval in 2026

The final quarter was again a close contest. Both teams had several inside-50s early in the quarter, but all were rebounded without score, with Maxwell and Goddard both prominent for their respective teams. The first score of the quarter was not until the 9th minute, when Leon Davis crumbed a goal from a stoppage, extending the margin to 14 points. In the 12th minute, Eddy hit the post from a long tight set shot won after catching O'Brien holding the ball; the Saints then scored goals through Hayes in the 14th minute, and Milne in the 15th minute off the ensuing centre break to bring the margin back to one point. In the 19th minute, Riewoldt had a 45-metre snap shot at the goals from a stoppage which was bouncing towards the goals, but was touched on the line by a desperate dive from Maxwell, levelling the scores at 61 apiece. Then, in the 20th minute, Goddard scored a goal from 20 metres out, directly in front, after taking a big specky over O'Brien. This gave St Kilda its first lead of the game, after Collingwood had been leading since the opening goal, 20 seconds into the game.

In the 22nd minute, Cloke's attempt for goal was rushed behind after he was awarded a free kick. In the 26th minute, Maxwell created a turnover which resulted in a goal to Cloke from five metres, putting Collingwood back in front by a point. Collingwood unsuccessfully attacked twice in the following two minutes from turnovers: a 50-metre set shot from Dawes which fell short and was punched out of bounds, and a 50-metre snap shot from Steele Sidebottom which fell short and was marked and rebounded. The rebound from that mark ended with Hayes taking a long shot towards Milne from 60 metres, but the kick eluded Milne and bounced through for a behind, tying the game at 68-apiece in the 30th minute. In the final minute of the game, St Kilda had the ball in its forward line, and after fifteen seconds of scrambling around 15–25 metres from goal, Collingwood cleared to the boundary line on the wing. Time elapsed, and the game finished drawn.

=== Norm Smith Medal ===
Norm Smith Medal voting tally
Position	Player	Club	Total votes	Vote summary
1st (winner)	Lenny Hayes	St Kilda	13	3, 3, 3, 3, 1
2nd	Brendon Goddard	St Kilda	7	3, 2, 1, 1
3rd	Dale Thomas	Collingwood	6	2, 2, 1, 1
4th (tied)	Sam Fisher	St Kilda	2	2
4th (tied)	Nick Maxwell	Collingwood	2	2

Lenny Hayes won the Norm Smith Medal for the drawn grand final comfortably, with 13 of a possible 15 votes, named best on ground by four of the five voters. He had 32 disposals, 12 tackles, five clearances, and five inside-50s. Brendon Goddard placed second with seven votes, while Dale Thomas came third with six votes, receiving the most Norm Smith votes of any Collingwood player. Sam Fisher and Nick Maxwell were the only other vote-getters with two votes each.

Chaired by Brad Scott, the voters and their choices were as follows:

Voter	Role	3 votes	2 votes	1 vote
Brad Scott	North Melbourne coach	Brendon Goddard	Dale Thomas	Lenny Hayes
Michael Gleeson	The Age	Lenny Hayes	Dale Thomas	Brendon Goddard
Chris Grant	Former AFL player	Lenny Hayes	Nick Maxwell	Brendon Goddard
Matthew Lloyd	3AW	Lenny Hayes	Brendon Goddard	Dale Thomas
Stephen Rielly	The Australian	Lenny Hayes	Sam Fisher	Dale Thomas

=== Grand final sprint ===
The final of the grand final sprint was held at half-time of the first final. It was won by Luke Miles from St Kilda, with Tim Golds from Greater Western Sydney and Lewis Jetta from Sydney finishing second and third respectively.

=== Aftermath ===
The draw immediately sparked debate about the practice of staging a full-length replay instead of playing extra time. After the game, the two captains, Nick Maxwell of Collingwood and Nick Riewoldt of St Kilda, both stated that they would have preferred an extra time period; Maxwell was particularly scathing of the arrangement, labelling it an "absolute joke" in an interview immediately after the final siren, but the full replay was not without its supporters, with Collingwood coach Michael Malthouse pledging his support to the traditional arrangement in his post-match press conference.

Oh, mate, I don't know if we've ever seen 44 blokes go to war like that. It was amazing.

— Nick Maxwell, Collingwood captain

It's war today. It's not too often you come back to fight another war a week later.

— Brendon Goddard, St Kilda midfielder

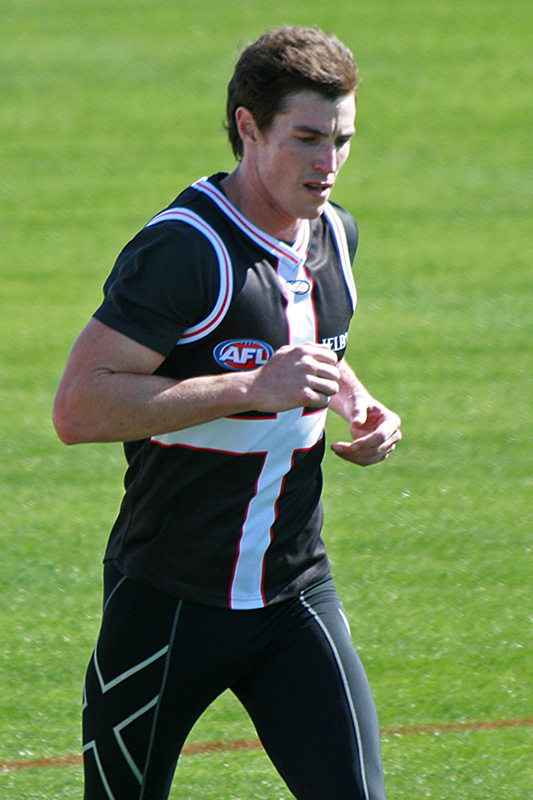
Lenny Hayes of St Kilda became the club's first Norm Smith Medallist.

Within a few days of the grand final, the organisers of several events already scheduled for 2 October made the commercial decision to reschedule their events to avoid a clash with the replay. The inaugural A-League derby clash between cross-town teams the Melbourne Victory and new franchise Melbourne Heart was postponed for 8 October to maximise promotion and publicity opportunities. The Victoria Racing Club moved the Turnbull Stakes to 3 October. Cricket Victoria delayed the opening of the Victorian Premier Cricket season to the following weekend. The Chris Mainwaring Legends Match, which raises money for Perth's Telethon, was moved to 9 October. The scheduling of several AFL post-season events was also affected: Collingwood's Copeland Trophy presentation was rescheduled to December, and the start of trade week and the father–son bidding meeting were moved from 4 to 5 October (with trade week shortened by one day). Many players had to reschedule their post-season holiday plans to be available to play in the replay.

In the grand final edition of the TV show Before the Game, Geelong's Harry Taylor predicted the draw and the subsequent Collingwood victory the next week.

On Tuesday 28 September, the AFL announced a rule change such that any player who had played in the drawn grand final but missed the replay, through omission or injury, would still receive a premiership medallion if his team was victorious. Under previous rules, players would not have received premiership medallions unless they were present in the team that won the premiership-deciding game. This would mean that Leon Davis, who would be replaced for the replay, would eventually receive a medallion (although he did not receive one during the match-day ceremony). Another rule change, that if the replay was also drawn, extra time would be played instead of a second replay, was also rushed through.

=== Scorecard and overall statistics ===
Most of the game statistics were fairly even across the game. Total disposals were won by St Kilda 338–326, contested possessions were won by Collingwood 153–148, and tackles were won by St Kilda 100–89. The two most lopsided statistics were clearances, which St Kilda won 46–38, despite having ten fewer than Collingwood in the second quarter, and inside-50s, which Collingwood dominated 62–35. Altogether, seven of Collingwood's 14 behinds were recorded as rushed, mostly from shots at goal which fell short and were touched or punched through. The official crowd of 100,016 was the highest since the 1986 VFL grand final, exceeding the crowd of the 2008 AFL grand final by only four people.

Grand final
25 September 2:30 pm	Collingwood	drew with	St Kilda	Melbourne Cricket Ground (crowd: 100,016)	Report
4.2 (26); 7.8 (50); 7.13 (55); 9.14 (68)	Q1; Q2; Q3; Final	3.2 (20); 4.2 (26); 7.5 (47); 10.8 (68)	Umpires: Chamberlain, Rosebury, Ryan; Norm Smith Medal: Lenny Hayes; Television broadcast: Seven Network; National anthem: Cam Henderson and Taylor Henderson
Cloke 2 Jolly, Blair, Didak, Thomas, Macaffer, O'Brien, Davis 1	Goals	Riewoldt, Milne, Goddard 2 Schneider, Koschitzke, Gilbert, Hayes
Shaw, Thomas, Brown, Maxwell, Cloke, Jolly	Best	Hayes, Goddard, Fisher, Gilbert, Gwilt, Schneider, Riewoldt
Prestigiacomo (groin), replaced in the side by Brown	Injuries	Gardiner (hamstring)

The grand final replay was played on a day without cloud, with the temperature around 20 °C for most of the game.

Collingwood was still the strong favourite with bookmakers for the replay, although the odds had tightened since the drawn match: major bookmakers were offering odds of around $1.60 for a Collingwood win in the replay, compared with $1.40–$1.45 for the grand final.

== Grand final replay, 2 October 2010 ==
2010 AFL Grand Final Replay

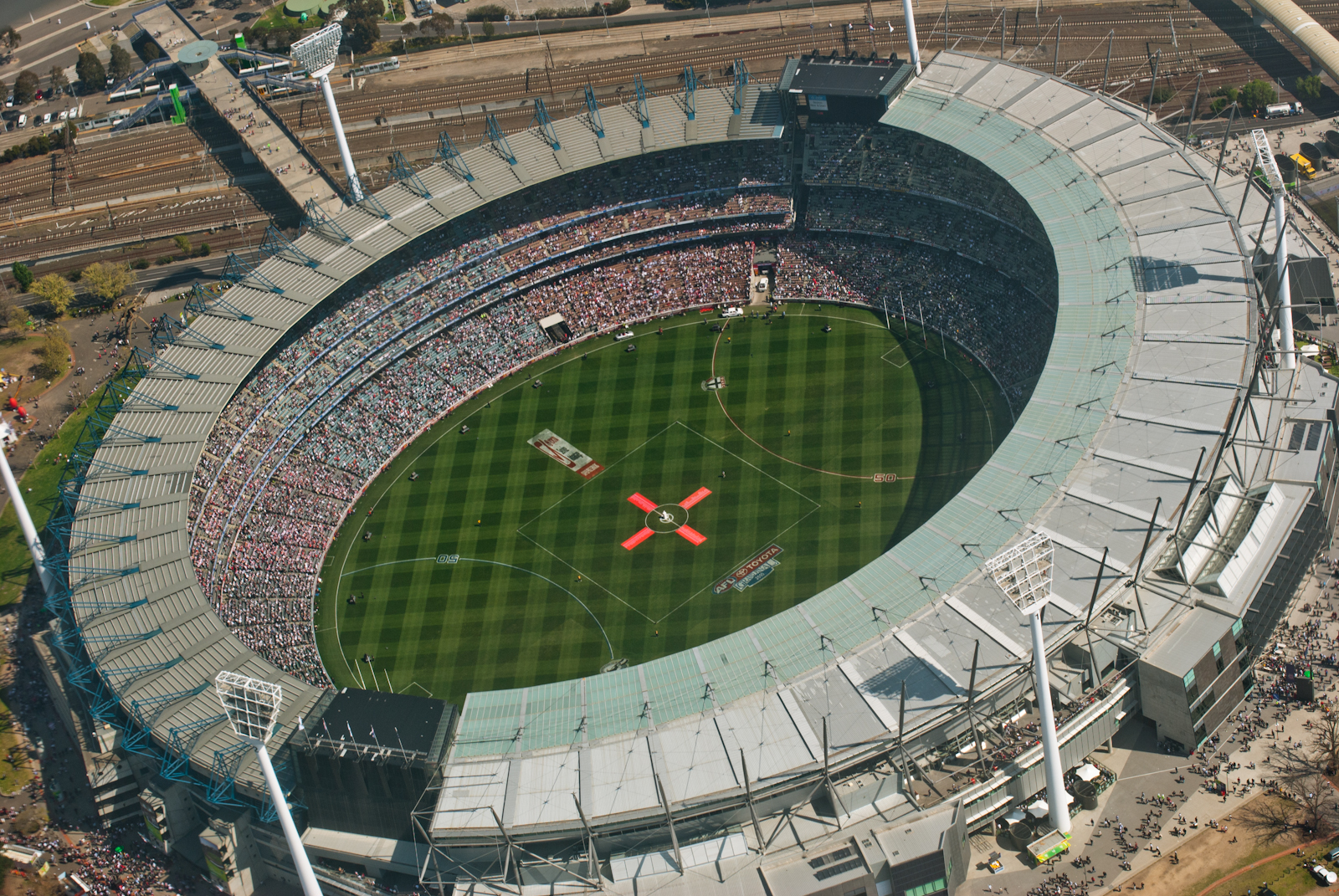
- Aerial view of the Melbourne Cricket Ground, during the replay's pre-match entertainment

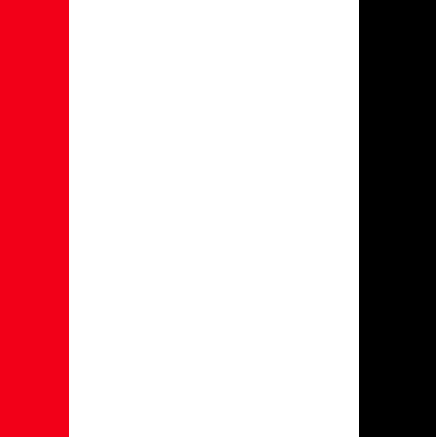
Collingwood	St Kilda
16.12 (108)	7.10 (52)
	1	2	3	4
COL	3.2 (20)	6.5 (41)	11.8 (74)	16.12 (108)
STK	0.2 (2)	1.8 (14)	4.9 (33)	7.10 (52)
- Date: 2 October 2010
- Stadium: Melbourne Cricket Ground
- Attendance: 93,853
- Favourite: Collingwood
- Umpires: Ray Chamberlain, Brett Rosebury, Shaun Ryan
- Coin toss won by: Collingwood
- Kicked toward: City End

Ceremonies
- Pre-match entertainment: Lionel Richie
- National anthem: Julie Anthony

Accolades
- Norm Smith Medallist: Scott Pendlebury (Collingwood)
- Jock McHale Medallist: Mick Malthouse (Collingwood)

Broadcast in Australia
- Network: Seven Network
- Commentators: Bruce McAvaney (host); Dennis Cometti (commentator); Leigh Matthews (expert commentator); Tom Harley (expert commentator); Matthew Richardson (boundary rider); Tim Watson (boundary rider)

=== First quarter ===
Prior to the first bounce, Nick Maxwell of Collingwood won the coin toss, and chose to kick to the (western) City End. Collingwood almost scored the opening goal in the first minute of the game, but an off-the-ball free kick against Dane Swan stripped Travis Cloke of a set shot from the goal square. The first score was registered in the 5th minute, a goal from a set shot by Tyson Goldsack. Up until the 11th minute, Collingwood won the inside-50s 6–1. Ben Johnson scored a goal for Collingwood in the 12th minute, and the Magpies led 14–0 after twenty minutes. St Kilda's first score came in the 21st minute in dramatic fashion, with a defensive effort from Heath Shaw turning a near-certain goal into a behind: Nick Riewoldt had marked two metres from goal in the goal square, and turned to play on, only to have Shaw dive across him from behind as he was dropping the ball, spoiling the ball before it reached Riewoldt's foot, and rushing the ball through for a behind. Brent Macaffer scored a crumbing goal for Collingwood from the goal square a minute later to extend the margin to 19 points. Riewoldt would get one more chance to get a goal at the last minute, but his 45-metre kick missed to the left. Collingwood led by 18 points at quarter time, and St Kilda was held goalless in the first quarter.

=== Second quarter ===
St Kilda dominated in the first half of the second quarter, with a first score registered 33 seconds after the bounce. However, they could not put pressure on the scoreboard, kicking five behinds in the first fourteen minutes of the quarter—three of which were scored by Sam Gilbert while on the run—to take St Kilda's total score to only 0.7 (7), while Alan Didak scored a goal for Collingwood from the goal square in the 6th minute. Brendon Goddard finally scored St Kilda's first goal in the 15th minute from a 20-metre set shot. After missing two difficult shots at goal in the 17th and 18th minutes, Collingwood goaled twice in the space of one minute, through Macaffer and Darren Jolly. The end of the quarter was filled with physical one-on-one contests with Collingwood willing to play for time, and no more goals were scored in the quarter. Two more opportunities for Collingwood ended up behinds but kept the pressure on St Kilda. Finally, Adam Schneider had a set shot from 30m as the siren sounded, but only managed a behind. In general play, the second quarter was fairly even, with St Kilda winning the inside-50s 13–10, but while none of their missed opportunities were easy shots, the Saints' inability to convert the chances they had contributed to their increasing deficit. Collingwood won the quarter 3.3 (21) to St Kilda's 1.6 (12) and took a 27-point lead into half time.

=== Third quarter ===
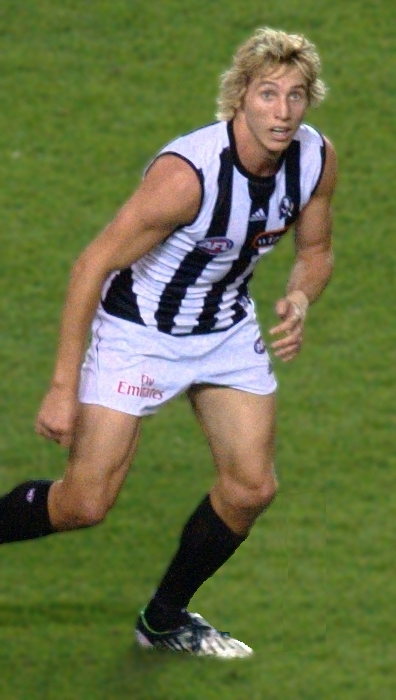
Dale "Daisy" Thomas was instrumental in the two grand finals, featuring in both Norm Smith Medal counts (2010)

Collingwood dominated in the third quarter. Following Schneider's minor score in the first 14 seconds of play, the Magpies responded with relentless pressure and strung together five straight scores, including a crumbing goal from Chris Dawes and consecutive goals by Sharrod Wellingham and Swan. It took Justin Koschitzke to end that streak, after marking the ball from a Riewoldt kick from the centre square. The two sides subsequently kicked goal for goal, with Didak, Lenny Hayes, Steele Sidebottom, and Sam Gilbert all registering goals. St Kilda had four shots at goal for three goals, while Collingwood had eight for five goals, and a rushed behind. Collingwood's three-quarter-time lead was 41 points.

=== Final quarter ===
Within two minutes, Dawes kicked a goal from about 40m out near the boundary line to stretch the margin to 47 points. From there, Collingwood's victory was never in doubt. The two teams alternated goals throughout the final term. Goals were scored by Dale Thomas (5th minute), Nick Dal Santo (7th minute), Harry O'Brien (12th minute, with the assistance of a 50-metre penalty), Stephen Milne (13th minute), Wellingham (17th minute), Milne again (25th minute), and finally Sidebottom (27th minute). After a final behind by St. Kilda, Collingwood played out the final minute of the game running out the clock, and the ball was in the hands of Didak as the final siren sounded for Collingwood's 56-point victory.

=== Norm Smith Medal ===
Norm Smith Medal voting tally
Position	Player	Club	Total votes	Vote summary
1st (winner)	Scott Pendlebury	Collingwood	10	2, 3, 3, 2
2nd	Steele Sidebottom	Collingwood	8	2, 3, 3
3rd	Dale Thomas	Collingwood	4	3, 1
4th	Dane Swan	Collingwood	3	1, 2
5th (tied)	Darren Jolly	Collingwood	2	1, 1
5th (tied)	Luke Ball	Collingwood	2	2
6th	Nathan Brown	Collingwood	1	1

Scott Pendlebury was awarded the Norm Smith Medal as the best player in the grand final replay, earning ten votes; he accumulated 29 disposals, seven marks and laid eleven tackles. Steele Sidebottom (25 disposals, two goals) was a close second, with eight votes. Thomas (27 disposals, eight marks) was third, with four votes. Dane Swan (26 disposals, eleven tackles) was fourth with three votes, and Jolly, Luke Ball and Nathan Brown also polled votes. The medal was fittingly presented to Pendlebury by former North Melbourne star Arnold Briedis, best on ground in the 1977 replay.

Voter	Role	3 votes	2 votes	1 vote
Tom Harley	Channel 7	Dale Thomas	Scott Pendlebury	Dane Swan
Danny Frawley	Triple M	Scott Pendlebury	Steele Sidebottom	Nathan Brown
Dermott Brereton	SEN 1116	Scott Pendlebury	Dane Swan	Dale Thomas
Martin Blake	The Age	Steele Sidebottom	Scott Pendlebury	Darren Jolly
Stan Alves	ABC	Steele Sidebottom	Luke Ball	Darren Jolly

=== Overall ===
The statistics of the match, unlike the drawn grand final, were mostly dominated by Collingwood. Collingwood beat St Kilda for disposals (379–326), kicks (250–178), marks (121–84) and tackles (87–67), while St Kilda had more handpasses than Collingwood (148–129). Collingwood was particularly dominant at ruck contests, winning 47 tap-outs to St Kilda's 26.

The win was the fifteenth VFL/AFL premiership won by Collingwood in its 114 years in the league. It was Collingwood's first premiership since 1990, only its second since 1958. It was the ninth time that Collingwood won both the premiership and the minor premiership in the same year, but the first time since 1930. It was also Collingwood's second consecutive premiership to be won in October and their first premiership since 1990. It was the third premiership won by Michael Malthouse as a coach, having previously won with the West Coast Eagles in 1992 and 1994, joining Leigh Matthews, David Parkin, Allan Jeans and Ron Barassi as coaches who have led more than one club to a premiership. With its loss, St Kilda became the first team since Collingwood in 2002 and 2003 to finish runners-up twice in a row.

The grand final replay was attended by 93,853 people, roughly 6,000 fewer than the drawn grand final. This was consistent with previous grand final replays in 1948 and 1977, both of which drew lower attendances than the drawn grand finals which preceded them.

=== Aftermath ===
On Monday 4 October, the Match Review Panel charged St Kilda's Adam Schneider with striking Brent Macaffer in the third quarter of the replay. Schneider was offered a two-week suspension for the incident.

In the offseason, the AFL commission discussed the possibility of introducing extra time to decide future drawn grand finals, but decided to retain the full grand final replay. The provision for a grand final replay was eventually removed, and replaced with extra time, starting from the 2016 season, making 2010's game the last grand final replay in the league's history.

Tyson Goldsack's mother placed a successful bet on her son, who is usually a defender but started in the forward-line, to kick the first goal of the replay. The Footy Show host James Brayshaw drew attention to this in July 2011, amidst investigations into that season's controversial betting plunges on the defenders to kick the first goal, but the AFL cleared Goldsack and his mother of any wrongdoing.

=== Scorecard ===
Grand final replay
2 October 2:30 pm	Collingwood	def.	St Kilda	Melbourne Cricket Ground (crowd: 93,853)	Report
3.2 (20); 6.5 (41); 11.8 (74); 16.12 (108)	Q1; Q2; Q3; Final	0.2 (2); 1.8 (14); 4.9 (33); 7.10 (52)	Umpires: Chamberlain, Rosebury, Ryan; Norm Smith Medal: Scott Pendlebury; Television broadcast: Seven Network; National anthem: Julie Anthony
Dawes, Didak, Macaffer, Sidebottom, Wellingham 2 Goldsack, Johnson, Jolly, O'Brien, Swan, D. Thomas 1	Goals	Milne 2 Dal Santo, Gilbert, Goddard, Hayes, Koschitzke 1
Ball, N. Brown, Jolly, Pendlebury, Shaw, Sidebottom, D. Thomas, Wellingham	Best	Dawson, Gilbert, Goddard, Gwilt, Jones
Reid (leg)	Injuries	Eddy (arm), Fisher (hamstring)
Nil	Reports	Schneider (striking)

== Teams ==
=== Drawn grand final ===
When named on Thursday night before the first final, St Kilda recalled Steven Baker who had not played since Round 13, due to a 9-game suspension, omitting Ben McEvoy. Collingwood made two changes to their preliminary final team, bringing in Leon Davis and Simon Prestigiacomo and omitting Tyson Goldsack and Nathan Brown. However, prior to the start of the first final, Brown replaced Prestigiacomo, who withdrew due to a groin strain.

Collingwood	St. Kilda

Collingwood
B:	5 Nick Maxwell (c)	16 Nathan Brown	34 Alan Toovey
HB:	8 Harry O'Brien	20 Ben Reid	39 Heath Shaw
C:	21 Sharrod Wellingham	36 Dane Swan	26 Ben Johnson
HF:	4 Alan Didak	32 Travis Cloke	12 Luke Ball
F:	17 Dayne Beams	31 Chris Dawes	22 Steele Sidebottom
Foll:	18 Darren Jolly	10 Scott Pendlebury	13 Dale Thomas
Int:	47 Jarryd Blair	30 Brent Macaffer	1 Leon Davis
Int:	15 Leigh Brown		
Coach:	Mick Malthouse		

St Kilda
B:	1 Jason Gram	6 Zac Dawson	19 Sam Gilbert
HB:	27 Jason Blake	25 Sam Fisher	40 Robert Eddy
C:	18 Brendon Goddard	26 Nick Dal Santo	22 Farren Ray
HF:	30 Brett Peake	23 Justin Koschitzke	11 Leigh Montagna
F:	13Adam Schneider	12 Nick Riewoldt (c)	44 Stephen Milne
Foll:	15 Michael Gardiner	7 Lenny Hayes	4 Clinton Jones
Int:	24 Sean Dempster	32 Andrew McQualter	33 James Gwilt
Int:	10 Steven Baker		
Coach:	Ross Lyon		

=== Grand final replay ===
The teams for the replayed grand final were announced on 30 September, with both sides making one change. Collingwood omitted out-of-form Leon Davis, who was replaced by defender Tyson Goldsack. St Kilda brought Ben McEvoy into the team, to replace injured ruckman Michael Gardiner.

Collingwood	St. Kilda

Collingwood
B:	5 Nick Maxwell (c)	16 Nathan Brown	34 Alan Toovey
HB:	8 Harry O'Brien	20 Ben Reid	39 Heath Shaw
C:	21 Sharrod Wellingham	36 Dane Swan	26 Ben Johnson
HF:	4 Alan Didak	32 Travis Cloke	12 Luke Ball
F:	17 Dayne Beams	31 Chris Dawes	22 Steele Sidebottom
Foll:	18 Darren Jolly	10 Scott Pendlebury	13 Dale Thomas
Int:	47 Jarryd Blair	30 Brent Macaffer	6 Tyson Goldsack
Int:	15 Leigh Brown		
Coach:	Mick Malthouse		

St Kilda
B:	1 Jason Gram	6 Zac Dawson	19 Sam Gilbert
HB:	27 Jason Blake	25 Sam Fisher	40 Robert Eddy
C:	18 Brendon Goddard	26 Nick Dal Santo	22 Farren Ray
HF:	30 Brett Peake	23 Justin Koschitzke	11 Leigh Montagna
F:	13Adam Schneider	12 Nick Riewoldt (c)	44 Stephen Milne
Foll:	5 Ben McEvoy	7 Lenny Hayes	4 Clinton Jones
Int:	24 Sean Dempster	32 Andrew McQualter	33 James Gwilt
Int:	10 Steven Baker		
Coach:	Ross Lyon		

== See also ==
- 2010 AFL finals series
- 2010 AFL season
- 1966 VFL Grand Final
- 1977 VFL Grand Final
- 1948 VFL Grand Final

== Footnotes ==
Notes
1.In 1897 and 1924 there were no grand finals required, as Essendon won a round-robin finals series. In 1948 and 1977, the grand final was drawn, and a replay was required for each.
2.The Geelong Football Club, who played the previous three grand finals, is based in regional west Victoria, not in Melbourne.
3.The games in the sequence were the 1966 grand final, 1972 first semi final, 1992 second elimination final, 2008 first semi Final and 2009 first qualifying final.
