= Nick Maxwell =

Australian rules footballer (born 1983)

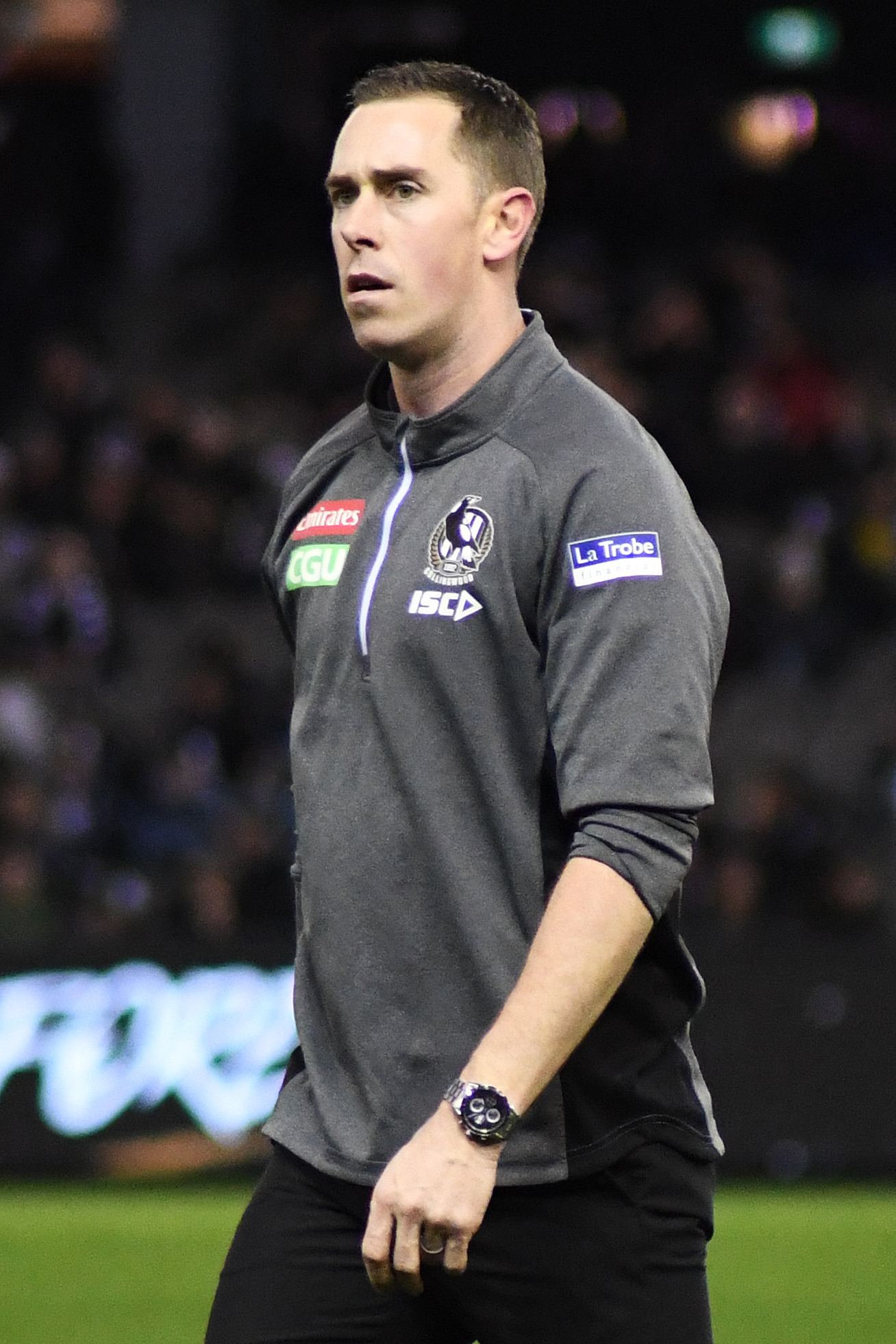
- Maxwell with Collingwood in August 2018

Personal information
- Full name: Nicholas Maxwell
- Born: 3 June 1983 (age 43); Geelong, Victoria
- Original team: North Ballarat (VFL)/Geelong Falcons(TAC Cup)/St Joseph's
- Draft: No. 15, 2002 Rookie Draft, Collingwood
- Height: 193 cm (6 ft 4 in)
- Weight: 93 kg (205 lb)
- Position: Defender

Playing career
Years	Club	Games (Goals)
2004–2014	Collingwood	208 (29)

Career highlights
- Gavin Brown Award 2007, 2008, 2009, 2012; Collingwood captain 2009–2013; All-Australian Team 2009; Collingwood premiership captain 2010; VFL premiership player: 2003; St Joseph's College Team of Champions

Nicholas Maxwell (born 3 June 1983) is a former Australian rules football player and former captain of the Collingwood Football Club in the Australian Football League (AFL).

== Early life ==
Nick Maxwell was born in Geelong to parents Sue and Doug and at age 10 moved to Wallington. He was educated at St. Joseph's College and he played his junior football for St Joseph’s Football Club. In 2020 he was named in the St Joseph’s College team of champions, recognising the best VFL/AFL players to have attended the school.

In 2001, Maxwell played for the Geelong Falcons in the TAC Cup.

His first senior football was played with the North Ballarat Football Club in the Victorian Football League (VFL).

== AFL career ==
Maxwell was spotted by AFL club Collingwood who selected him as a rookie player in 2002.

In his first year at the club he played most of his games with VFL affiliate Williamstown Seagulls. Late the following year, he played in an off-season exhibition match in London against Fremantle, in which he performed impressively. Collingwood retained Maxwell on their rookie list. When Tom Davidson was added to the long-term injury list, the club promoted Maxwell to the senior list. His debut came soon after in Round 9 against Adelaide and proved enough, playing 10 games in his first season as a hard-running defender. His size however was still tall and very lean. His promotion was then lifted as he was elevated onto the senior list for the next season.

In 2005, Maxwell had a breakthrough once again. His presence was more physical. After spending two weeks in the grandstands he received the call up to replace the out of form Ryan Lonie in round three, and did not miss another match. He kicked six goals for the season, at times when they were needed late in a quarter to help momentum. At 22 he was regarded by many as a player possessing outstanding maturity and dedication onfield.

Maxwell had a solid start to the season in 2006. In Round 10 he put his body on the line in a contest where he dived in to receive a hard ball get, getting crunched by Jonathan Brown of the Brisbane Lions, and he broke his leg. He missed the next 6 weeks with the broken leg, but would come back to the side and play every game for the rest of the year, showing his reasons of cementing a spot in the soon to be successful side.

In 2007, he became AFL Players Association representative for Collingwood. He played all 25 games, including three finals and was a regular contributor to the side. Coach Mick Malthouse used Maxwell as a utility, with an ability to play both ends of the ground and kicking eight goals. His total of 98 tackles, third highest at Collingwood. An example was his vigorous tackle in the Preliminary Final against Geelong's Max Rooke. Maxwell's leadership at Collingwood was shown throughout the season. He captained the club for the first time in Round 16 against Essendon in a 29-point win.

In the 2008 pre-season, Maxwell was handed the number five guernsey, worn by retired club captain and icon Nathan Buckley. He also became the vice-captain of the side and was one of the favourites to beat Scott Burns for the captaincy role left vacant by Buckley, but Burns was given the top job.

=== Captaincy ===
On 17 December 2008 Collingwood Football Club announced the appointment of Maxwell as the club captain.

In the 2009 NAB Cup, Maxwell was controversially cited by the AFL tribunal for a shirtfront on West Coast's Patrick McGinnity which broke McGinnity's jaw. The incident caused significant controversy. Collingwood launched a successful appeal, one of only two (the other being Melbourne's Jack Viney in 2014) in the history of the 2005–14 incarnation of the AFL tribunal and the decision was overturned.

He was suspended in Round 3 of the AFL season for an incident involving Steve Johnson of the Geelong Cats, causing some media commentators to cast doubts on his choice as club captain.

Maxwell was selected in the 2009 All-Australian side on the half back flank.

On 2 October 2010, Maxwell captained Collingwood to its first AFL premiership in 20 years; the first since the 1990 premiership victory. The win came about in semi-controversial style, with the first Grand Final ending in a draw one week earlier. Maxwell declared the situation an "absolute joke" in an interview with Matthew Richardson immediately post-game. Collingwood won the replay 16.12(108) to St Kilda 7.10(52), giving his side their 15th Premiership.

=== Retirement ===
Maxwell announced his retirement at a press conference at Westpac Centre on 16 July 2014 following results of a long term ankle injury suffered the week before in the Round 17, 2014 clash with Essendon.

In November 2014, Maxwell joined NRL club Melbourne Storm as the club's Leadership Development Coach. The role saw Maxwell work at the club for one day a week overseeing Storm's Emerging Leadership program and developing the off-field preparation and skills of the younger players in the NRL squad. Maxwell also assisted Head Coach Craig Bellamy in working with the senior leadership group. 1 year later in November 2015, he joined AFL club Greater Western Sydney Giants, as part of the club's leadership program. In 2017 Maxwell returned to Collingwood as a Club Runner and Bench Assistant. In 2018, Maxwell joined BBL Team, the Melbourne Stars to observe and provide advice on the club's leadership program.

== Statistics ==
Legend
G	Goals	K	Kicks	D	Disposals	T	Tackles
B	Behinds	H	Handballs	M	Marks

Season	Team	No.	Games	Totals							Averages (per game)						
Season	Team	No.	Games	G	B	K	H	D	M	T	G	B	K	H	D	M	T
2004	Collingwood	43	10	0	0	36	53	89	31	14	0.0	0.0	3.6	5.3	8.9	3.1	1.4
2005	Collingwood	27	20	6	6	138	101	239	80	43	0.3	0.3	6.9	5.1	12.0	4.0	2.2
2006	Collingwood	27	17	2	0	86	112	198	72	32	0.1	0.0	5.1	6.6	11.6	4.2	1.9
2007	Collingwood	27	25	8	5	146	137	283	98	98	0.3	0.2	5.8	5.5	11.3	3.9	3.9
2008	Collingwood	5	23	7	1	148	160	308	104	66	0.3	0.0	6.4	7.0	13.4	4.5	2.9
2009	Collingwood	5	23	3	2	205	206	411	146	59	0.1	0.1	8.9	9.0	17.9	6.3	2.6
2010	Collingwood	5	22	0	3	186	153	339	121	60	0.0	0.1	8.5	7.0	15.4	5.5	2.7
2011	Collingwood	5	19	0	2	151	100	251	73	59	0.0	0.1	7.9	5.3	13.2	3.8	3.1
2012	Collingwood	5	20	2	0	168	123	291	93	58	0.1	0.0	8.4	6.2	14.6	4.7	2.9
2013	Collingwood	5	19	1	0	149	136	285	88	70	0.1	0.0	7.8	7.2	15.0	4.6	3.7
2014	Collingwood	5	10	0	0	78	57	135	44	28	0.0	0.0	7.8	5.7	13.5	4.4	2.8
Career			208	29	19	1491	1338	2829	950	587	0.1	0.1	7.2	6.4	13.6	4.6	2.8

== Personal life ==
Maxwell married Erin in 2009 in Byron Bay. The couple have three children.
