= List of Australian Football League team songs =

An Australian Football League team song is traditionally sung by members of the winning team after an AFL game. It is played when each team runs out onto the field prior to the beginning of the match, and played for the winning team at the end of the match.

Club Name	Song name	Basis	First Used	Writer/Composer
Adelaide	"The Pride of South Australia"	"US Marines Corps Hymn"	1994	Club version by William Sanders (based on 1867 composition by Jacques Offenbach)
Brisbane Lions	"The Pride of Brisbane Town"	"La Marseillaise"	1997	Club version (Based on Fitzroy club version by Bill Stephen from 1952 which was based on 1792 composition by Claude Joseph Rouget de Lisle)
Carlton	"We are the Navy Blues"	"Lily of Laguna"	c. 1930	Club version by Ernie Walton (based on 1889 composition by Leslie Stuart)
Collingwood	"Good Ol' Collingwood Forever"	"Goodbye, Dolly Gray"	1906	Club version by Tom Nelson (based on 1897 composition by Paul Barnes and Will D. Cobb )
Essendon	"See the Bombers Fly Up"	"(Keep Your) Sunny Side Up"	1959	Club version by Kevin Andrews (based on 1929 composition by B. G. DeSylva, Lew Brown and Ray Henderson)
Fremantle	"Freo Way To Go"	"Song of the Volga Boatmen"	1995	Club version by Ken Walther (Shortened version used from 2012 onwards following a member's poll)
Geelong	"We Are Geelong"	"The Toreador Song"	1963	Club version by John K. Watts (based on an 1875 composition by Georges Bizet to a libretto by Henri Meilhac and Ludovic Halévy)
Gold Coast	"We Are the Suns of the Gold Coast Sky"	Original	2010	Rosco Elliott
Greater Western Sydney	"There's A Big Big Sound"	Arabian riff	2012	Harry Angus
Hawthorn	"The Mighty Fighting Hawks" (also known as "We're A Happy Team at Hawthorn")	"The Yankee Doodle Boy"	c. 1956	Club version by Jack O'Hagan and Chick Lander (based on 1911 composition by George M. Cohan)
Melbourne	"It's a Grand Old Flag"	"You're a Grand Old Flag"	c. 1912	Club lyrics (second verse) by Keith "Bluey" Truscott (based on 1906 composition by George M. Cohan); Current recording made 1972 by Fable Singers
North Melbourne	"Join in the Chorus"	"Just a wee Deoch an Doris"	1920s	Club lyrics unknown (based on 1911 composition by Sir Harry Lauder)
Port Adelaide	"Power to Win"	Original	1997	Quentin Eyers and Les Kaczmarek
Richmond	"We're from Tiger Land"	"Row, Row, Row"	1962	Club version by Jack Malcolmson (based on 1912 composition by William Jerome and James Monaco (Row, Row, Row lyrics © Peermusic Publishing sung by Bing Crosby))
St Kilda	"When the Saints Go Marching In"	"When the Saints Go Marching In"	c. 1965	Club version of folk song of unknown origin
Sydney	"The Red and the White"	"Notre Dame Victory March"	1961	Club lyrics by Larry Spokes (based on 1908 composition by Michael J. Shea and John F. Shea)
West Coast	"We're Flying High"	Original	2000	Based on 1987 composition by Kevin Peek, used from the 2000 season until 2017 and then again from 2025 onwards.
Western Bulldogs	"Sons of the West"	"Sons of the Sea"	c. 1935	Club version origins unknown (based on 1897 composition by Felix McGlennon)

== Notes ==
- The Brisbane Bears' team song was to the tune of "Battle Hymn of the Republic/Mine Eyes Have Seen the Glory/Glory, Glory Hallelujah"
- The Fitzroy Lions' team song was compiled by Bill Stephen in 1952 on a train to Perth during a football trip. Bill Stephen wrote the first line of the song after which each other player wrote a line. It is to the tune of the French National Anthem, "La Marseillaise", and was adopted by Brisbane in 1997.
- The Western Bulldogs team song was originally called "Sons of the 'Scray" before Footscray changed their name to the Western Bulldogs in 1997, with the song's lyrics being altered to "Sons of the West". At that same time, other lyric changes were made to the last few lines of the song.
- The South Melbourne Swans' club song was identical to the current Sydney Swans club song, with the lyric "South will go in and win over all" being changed to "Swans will go in..." when the club relocated to Sydney in 1982. Until 2021, the Sydney Swans used the same 1972 recording by The Fable Singers, with "South" being re-dubbed as "Swans". In 2021, the club adopted a previously unused recording of the song dating from 2018, and the lyric "While our loyal Swans are marching" was re-dubbed over the new recording - replacing the previously used "While her loyal sons are marching" and making the song more gender inclusive, as the Swans now had a women's team.
- Prior to their relocation to Moorabbin, St Kilda's team song was a variation on I Do Like to Be Beside the Seaside, referring to the Saints' original home ground the Junction Oval.
- The Fremantle Dockers' club song used from 1995 until 2011 contained a section based on "The Song of the Volga Boatmen", a Russian folk song, but most of the song was an original composition by Ken Walther. After the 2011 season, the "Volga Boatmen" section was dropped, leaving only the part written by Walther.
