= 1951 Hawthorn Football Club season =

27th season in the Victorian Football League

Hawthorn Football Club
1951 season
- President: Dave Prentice
- Coach: Bob McCaskill
- Captain: Kevin Curran
- Home ground: Glenferrie Oval
- Lightning Premiership: 1st Round
- VFL Season: 4–14 (11th)
- Finals Series: Did not qualify
- Best and Fairest: John Kennedy Sr.
- Leading goalkicker: Pat Cash (26)
- Highest home attendance: 14,000 (Round 12 vs. Carlton)
- Lowest home attendance: 9,000 (Round 5 vs. North Melbourne)
- Average home attendance: 10,889

The 1951 season was the Hawthorn Football Club's 27th season in the Victorian Football League and 50th overall.

== Fixture ==
=== Lightning Premiership ===
The lightning premiership was played between rounds 3 and 4.

Rd	Date and local time	Opponent	Scores (Hawthorn's scores indicated in bold)			Venue	Attendance
Rd	Date and local time	Opponent	Home	Away	Result	Venue	Attendance
1	Wednesday, 9 May	Melbourne	**0.1 (1)**	0.4 (4)	Lost by 3 points	Melbourne Cricket Ground (H)	

=== Premiership Season ===
Rd	Date and local time	Opponent	Scores (Hawthorn's scores indicated in bold)			Venue	Attendance	Record
Rd	Date and local time	Opponent	Home	Away	Result	Venue	Attendance	Record
1	Saturday, 21 April (2:15 pm)	Carlton	13.9 (87)	**7.15 (57)**	Lost by 30 points	Princes Park (A)	13,000	0–1
2	Saturday, 28 April (2:15 pm)	Essendon	**9.7 (61)**	12.14 (86)	Lost by 25 points	Glenferrie Oval (H)	12,000	0–2
3	Saturday, 5 May (2:15 pm)	St Kilda	**12.15 (87)**	9.10 (64)	Won by 23 points	Glenferrie Oval (H)	10,000	1–2
4	Saturday, 12 May (2:15 pm)	Richmond	17.18 (120)	**7.14 (56)**	Lost by 64 points	Punt Road Oval (A)	15,000	1–3
5	Saturday, 19 May (2:15 pm)	North Melbourne	**7.18 (60)**	14.14 (98)	Lost by 38 points	Glenferrie Oval (H)	9,000	1–4
6	Saturday, 2 June (2:15 pm)	Footscray	**9.16 (70)**	7.17 (59)	Won by 11 points	Glenferrie Oval (H)	10,000	2–4
7	Saturday, 9 June (2:15 pm)	Geelong	20.13 (133)	**8.15 (63)**	Lost by 70 points	Kardinia Park (A)	20,000	2–5
8	Saturday, 16 June (2:15 pm)	South Melbourne	12.14 (86)	**7.11 (53)**	Lost by 33 points	Lake Oval (A)	8,500	2–6
9	Saturday, 23 June (2:15 pm)	Collingwood	**8.9 (57)**	13.7 (85)	Lost by 28 points	Glenferrie Oval (H)	12,000	2–7
10	Saturday, 7 July (2:15 pm)	Fitzroy	10.14 (74)	**11.9 (75)**	Won by 1 point	Brunswick Street Oval (A)	8,500	3–7
11	Saturday, 14 July (2:15 pm)	Melbourne	**18.12 (120)**	13.8 (86)	Won by 34 points	Glenferrie Oval (H)	10,000	4–7
12	Saturday, 21 July (2:15 pm)	Carlton	**5.8 (38)**	7.13 (55)	Lost by 17 points	Glenferrie Oval (H)	14,000	4–8
13	Saturday, 28 July (2:15 pm)	Essendon	16.18 (114)	**8.11 (59)**	Lost by 55 points	Windy Hill (A)	13,000	4–9
14	Saturday, 4 August (2:15 pm)	St Kilda	11.8 (74)	**9.14 (68)**	Lost by 6 points	Junction Oval (A)	6,000	4–10
15	Saturday, 11 August (2:15 pm)	Richmond	**6.15 (51)**	10.13 (73)	Lost by 22 points	Glenferrie Oval (H)	11,000	4–11
16	Saturday, 18 August (2:15 pm)	North Melbourne	10.11 (71)	**8.11 (59)**	Lost by 12 points	Arden Street Oval (A)	6,000	4–12
17	Saturday, 25 August (2:15 pm)	Footscray	11.14 (80)	**9.10 (64)**	Lost by 16 points	Western Oval (A)	14,000	4–13
18	Saturday, 1 September (2:15 pm)	Geelong	**5.8 (38)**	10.10 (70)	Lost by 32 points	Glenferrie Oval (H)	10,000	4–14

== Ladder ==
(P)	Premiers
	Qualified for finals

#	Team	P	W	L	D	PF	PA	%	Pts
1	Geelong (P)	18	14	4	0	1485	1097	135.4	56
2	Collingwood	18	14	4	0	1499	1193	125.6	56
3	Essendon	18	13	5	0	1530	1262	121.2	52
4	Footscray	18	12	6	0	1316	1165	113.0	48
5	Fitzroy	18	10	6	2	1373	1305	105.2	44
6	Richmond	18	10	8	0	1551	1327	116.9	40
7	Carlton	18	8	9	1	1341	1253	107.0	34
8	South Melbourne	18	8	9	1	1399	1505	93.0	34
9	North Melbourne	18	7	11	0	1224	1433	85.4	28
10	St Kilda	18	5	13	0	1311	1595	82.2	20
11	Hawthorn	18	4	14	0	1136	1515	75.0	16
12	Melbourne	18	1	17	0	1230	1745	70.5	4

Rules for classification: 1. premiership points; 2. percentage; 3. points for
Average score: 75.9
Source: AFL Tables
