= 1941 Hawthorn Football Club season =

17th season in the Victorian Football League

Hawthorn Football Club
1941 season
- President: Dr. Jacob Jona
- Coach: Bert Mills
- Captain: Bert Mills
- Home ground: Glenferrie Oval
- Lightning Premiership: 1st Round
- VFL Season: 3–15 (12th)
- Finals Series: Did not qualify
- Best and Fairest: Alec Albiston
- Leading goalkicker: Alec Albiston (57)
- Highest home attendance: 10,000 (Round 5 vs. Essendon)
- Lowest home attendance: 2,000 (Round 12 vs. Melbourne
- Average home attendance: 6,500

The 1941 season was the Hawthorn Football Club's 17th season in the Victorian Football League and 40th overall.

== Fixture ==
=== Lightning Premiership ===
The VFL held a lightning premiership competition for the second season in a row. The competition was held between rounds 4 and 5

Rd	Date and local time	Opponent	Scores (Hawthorn's scores indicated in bold)			Venue	Attendance
Rd	Date and local time	Opponent	Home	Away	Result	Venue	Attendance
1	Saturday, 24 May	Fitzroy	4.0 (24)	**3.1 (19)**	Lost by 5 points	Melbourne Cricket Ground (A)	

=== Premiership Season ===
Rd	Date and local time	Opponent	Scores (Hawthorn's scores indicated in bold)			Venue	Attendance	Record
Rd	Date and local time	Opponent	Home	Away	Result	Venue	Attendance	Record
1	Saturday. 26 April (2:45 pm)	Footscray	13.15 (93)	**7.10 (52)**	Lost by 41 points	Western Oval (A)	10,500	0–1
2	Saturday, 3 May (2:45 pm)	Collingwood	**13.17 (95)**	17.16 (118)	Lost by 23 points	Glenferrie Oval (H)	9,000	0–2
3	Saturday, 10 May (2:45 pm)	Carlton	18.12 (120)	**10.13 (73)**	Lost by 47 points	Princes Park Football Ground (A)	9,000	0–3
4	Saturday, 17 May (2:45 pm)	Geelong	**13.16 (94)**	11.13 (79)	Won by 15 points	Glenferrie Oval (H)	6,000	1–3
5	Saturday, 31 May (2:45 pm)	Essendon	**8.12 (60)**	23.18 (156)	Lost by 96 points	Glenferrie Oval (H)	10,000	1–4
6	Saturday, 7 June (2:45 pm)	Richmond	17.15 (117)	**8.14 (62)**	Lost by 55 points	Punt Road Oval (A)	8,500	1–5
7	Saturday, 14 June (2:30 pm)	South Melbourne	**6.20 (56)**	13.12 (90)	Lost by 34 points	Glenferrie Oval (H)	7,000	1–6
8	Saturday, 21 June (2:30 pm)	Melbourne	**6.8 (44)**	12.12 (84)	Lost by 40 points	Glenferrie Oval (H)	2,000	1–7
9	Saturday, 28 June (2:30 pm)	Fitzroy	21.19 (145)	**10.20 (80)**	Lost by 65 points	Brunswick Street Oval (A)	7,000	1–8
10	Saturday, 5 July (2:30 pm)	North Melbourne	13.20 (98)	**6.14 (50)**	Lost by 48 points	Arden Street Oval (A)	3,000	1–9
11	Saturday, 12 July (2:30 pm)	St Kilda	**13.12 (90)**	9.15 (69)	Won by 21 points	Glenferrie Oval (H)	4,000	2–9
12	Saturday, 19 July (2:30 pm)	Footscray	**11.14 (80)**	15.12 (102)	Lost by 22 points	Glenferrie Oval (H)	5,000	2–10
13	Saturday, 26 July (2:30 pm)	Collingwood	22.20 (152)	**12.13 (85)**	Lost by 67 points	Victoria Park (A)	4,000	2–11
14	Saturday, 2 August (2:45 pm)	Carlton	**11.15 (81)**	16.25 (121)	Lost by 40 points	Glenferrie Oval (H)	7,500	2–12
15	Saturday, 9 August (2:45 pm)	Geelong	22.12 (144)	**19.15 (129)**	Lost by 15 points	Kardinia Park (A)	4,500	2–13
16	Saturday, 16 August (2:45 pm)	Essendon	19.17 (131)	**14.9 (93)**	Lost by 38 points	Windy Hill (A)	7,000	2–14
17	Saturday, 23 August (2:45 pm)	Richmond	**8.12 (60)**	18.22 (130)	Lost by 70 points	Glenferrie Oval (H)	8,000	2–15
18	Saturday, 30 August (2:45 pm)	South Melbourne	7.12 (54)	**11.17 (83)**	Won by 29 points	Lake Oval (A)	3,000	3–15

== Ladder ==
(P)	Premiers
	Qualified for finals

#	Team	P	W	L	D	PF	PA	%	Pts
1	Carlton	18	14	4	0	1948	1619	120.3	56
2	Melbourne (P)	18	14	4	0	1993	1701	117.2	56
3	Richmond	18	14	4	0	1714	1469	116.7	56
4	Essendon	18	13	5	0	1864	1431	130.3	52
5	Collingwood	18	12	6	0	1743	1571	110.9	48
6	Footscray	18	10	8	0	1676	1517	110.5	40
7	Fitzroy	18	8	10	0	1695	1760	96.3	32
8	South Melbourne	18	8	10	0	1397	1552	90.0	32
9	North Melbourne	18	6	12	0	1759	1893	92.9	24
10	Geelong	18	3	15	0	1561	1880	83.0	12
11	St Kilda	18	3	15	0	1454	1775	81.9	12
12	Hawthorn	18	3	15	0	1367	2003	68.2	12

Rules for classification: 1. premiership points; 2. percentage; 3. points for
Average score: 93.4
Source: AFL Tables
