= Arthur Reece =

- Born: William Joseph Lee Colverd; 5 February 1870; London, England
- Died: 2 April 1964 (aged 94); Twickenham, Middlesex
- Occupation: Comic singer

William Joseph Lee Colverd (5 February 1870 – 2 April 1964), who used the stage name Arthur Reece, was an English comedian and singer who performed in music halls.

== Biography ==
William Colverd was born in London, the son of Jovial Joe Colverd (1849–1903), a music hall performer who sang patriotic songs dressed as the character John Bull. William worked in the civil service before taking the name Arthur Reece for his stage performances. He became well known as a comedian and singer in the style of Charles Godfrey, who gave Reece permission to sing his songs where he was not working himself.

Reece became very popular with his performances of patriotic songs during the Boer War, such as "Good News from the War", "Bury Her Picture with Me", and "The Boers Have Got My Daddy". His best remembered song is "Sons of the Sea", written by Felix McGlennon, which Reece performed wearing the uniform of a naval officer. The song was published in 1897, but revived after the sinking of the cruiser HMS Gladiator in 1908, and during the First World War. Reece's other successful songs included the much-parodied "When There Isn’t a Girl About", and "The Wedding Bells Shall Not Ring Out".

In 1905, Reece was 'King Rat' in the charity, the Grand Order of Water Rats. He continued to work long after the First World War, appearing in some of Charles Austin's productions in the 1930s, and as part of the "Cavalcade of Variety" at the 1935 Royal Variety Performance. His final stage appearances took place during the 1950s.

He died in 1964, at the age of 94, at Brinsworth House in Twickenham.
