= Associated Marine =

Australian marine insurance underwriting agency (1982-2013)

Associated Marine Insurers (Agents) Pty Ltd was an Australian marine insurance underwriting agency which for decades was jointly owned by insurers, Zurich Australia and CGU Insurance (an offshoot of Commercial Union) and founded in 1982. In its heyday, Associated Marine provided much needed specialist insurance to the Australian Marine market. Zurich Australia took over full control of the business in 2004.

Its first managing director was Michael Hill.

By 2002, the marine insurance market was shrinking, particularly in Australia, due to both a decrease in the risks of shipping and in a fall in the number of Australian-registered ships.

It provides an example of a market failure. Following a change in CGU's ownership structure Zurich took over ownership of Associated Marine 100%. That marked the downfall of Associated Marine, who found their strategy dictated by an insurer who was ignorant of the nuances of a specialist agency. The company aligned its activities more closely with that of Zurich in 2011, with the managing director Stephen Ford leaving the company at that time. The process of absorbing it into Zurich was completed in 2013.
