= Collingwood Football Club =

Australian rules football club

Names
- Full name: Collingwood Football Club Limited
- Nickname(s): Magpies, Pies, Woods, Woodsmen, Mags, Maggies
- Motto: Floreat Pica (Note: "May The Magpie Prosper" or "May The Magpie Flourish" is the club motto, suggested by former Collingwood player, Bob Rush.) (May The Magpie Flourish)

2026 season
- After finals: 10th
- Home-and-away season: 9th
- Leading goalkicker: Daniel McStay (47 goals)
- Copeland Trophy: Nick Daicos

Club details
- Founded: 12 February 1892; 134 years ago
- Colours: Black, white
- Competition: AFL: Senior men AFLW: Senior women VFL: Reserves men VFLW: Reserves women
- President: Barry Carp
- CEO: Craig Kelly
- Coach: AFL: Craig McRae; AFLW: Sam Wright; VFL: Matthew Lokan; VFLW: Tom Cashin
- Captain(s): AFL: Darcy Moore; AFLW: Ruby Schleicher; VFL: Sam Glover; VFLW: Caitlin Bunker
- Premierships: Seniors; VFL/AFL (16): 1902; 1903; 1910; 1917; 1919; 1927; 1928; 1929; 1930; 1935; 1936; 1953; 1958; 1990; 2010; 2023; VFA/VFL (1): 1896; Reserves; VFL/AFL Reserves (7): 1919; 1920; 1922; 1925; 1940; 1965; 1976; VFLW (1): 2019
- Ground: AFL: Melbourne Cricket Ground (100,024); AFLW/VFLW: Victoria Park (10,000); VFL: Victoria Park & Olympic Park (3,500)
- Former ground: Victoria Park (1892–1999)
- Training ground: KGM Centre (indoor) Olympic Park Oval (outdoor)

Uniforms
Home	Away	Clash

Other information
- Official website: collingwoodfc.com.au

The Collingwood Football Club, nicknamed the Magpies or colloquially the Pies, is a professional Australian rules football club based in Melbourne that competes in the Australian Football League (AFL), the sport's elite competition. Founded in 1892 in the Melbourne suburb of Collingwood, the club played in the Victorian Football Association (VFA) before joining seven other teams in 1896 to form the breakaway Victorian Football League (VFL), known today as the Australian Football League (AFL). Originally based at Victoria Park, Collingwood now plays home games at the Melbourne Cricket Ground and has its headquarters and training facilities at Olympic Park Oval and the KGM Centre.

Collingwood has played in a record 45 VFL/AFL Grand Finals (including rematches), winning 16 premierships (tied with Carlton and Essendon), drawing two (a record) and losing 27 (also a record). Regarded as one of Australia's most popular sports teams, Collingwood, as of 2013, attracted the highest attendance figures and television ratings of any professional football club in the nation, across all codes. In 2023, it topped the AFL membership ladder with 106,470 members.

The club's song, "Good Old Collingwood Forever", dates back to 1906, making it the oldest team song currently used in the AFL. Its home guernsey consists of black and white stripes, based on the colours of the Australian magpie. Another kind of colour is white and black stripes instead. Historically, the club's biggest rivals have been neighbouring clubs Carlton and Richmond. Collingwood has also enjoyed a healthy Anzac Day rivalry with Essendon since 1995.

Collingwood fields a reserves team in the Victorian Football League (formerly the VFA) and women's teams in the AFL Women's and VFL Women's competitions. It also owned and operated a netball team in the National Netball League from 2017 to 2023.

== History ==
Chart of yearly ladder positions for Collingwood in VFL/AFL

=== Formation and early years ===
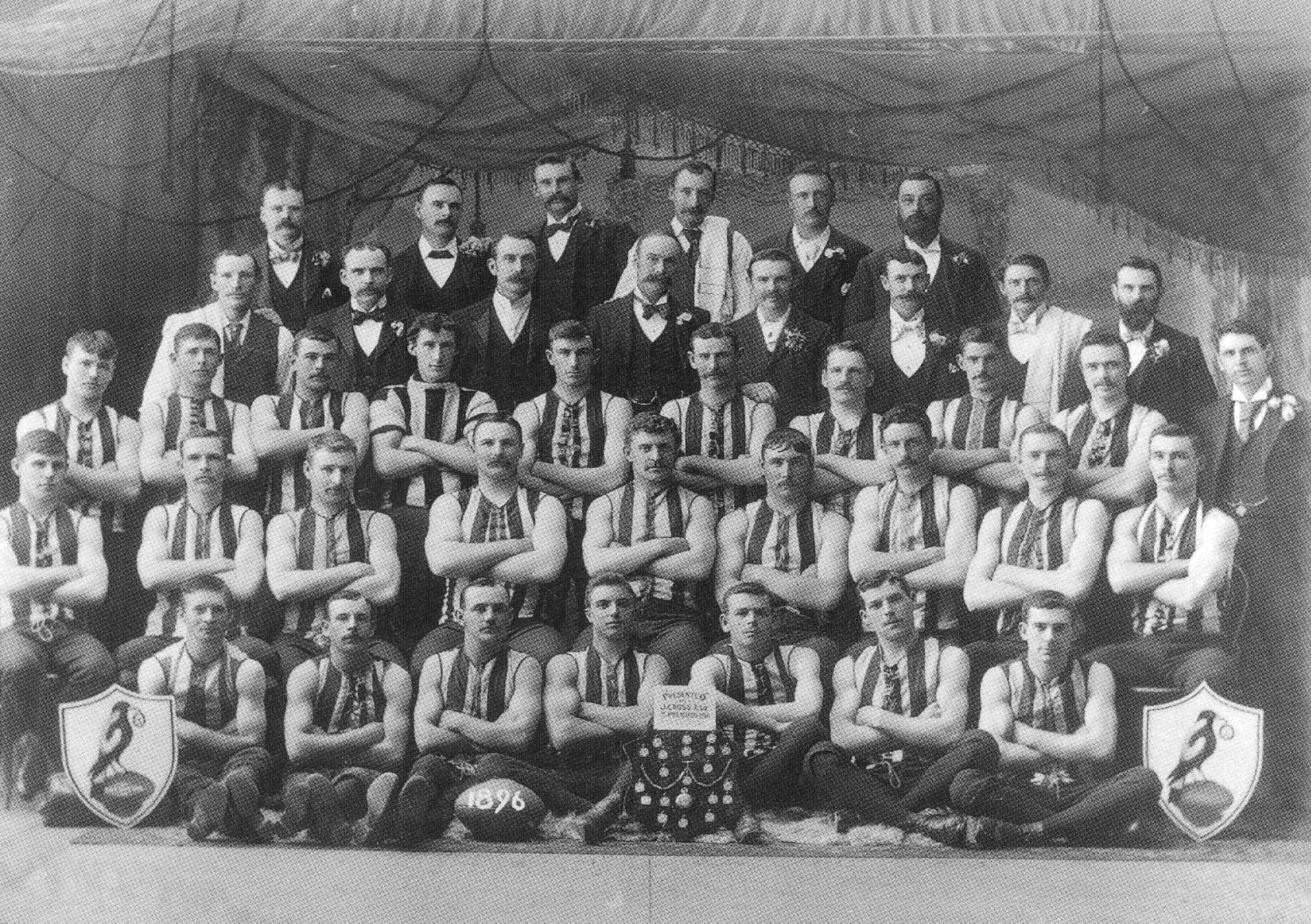
The Collingwood team that won the VFA premiership in 1896

The Collingwood Football Club was established on 12 February 1892.

Collingwood played its first game in the Victorian Football Association (VFA) against Carlton on 7 May 1892. The club won the VFA Premiership in 1896.

In 1897, Collingwood, along with fellow VFA clubs Fitzroy, Melbourne, St Kilda, Carlton, Essendon, South Melbourne and Geelong split from the VFA and formed the Victorian Football League (VFL).

Collingwood won its first premiership in 1902, defeating Essendon by 33 points in the 1902 VFL Grand Final.

=== 1920s and 1930s: Four consecutive premierships ===
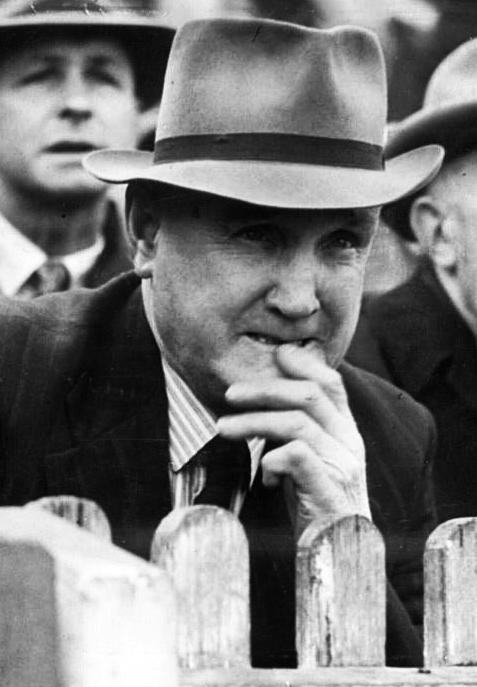
Jock McHale coached the club to four consecutive Grand Final victories

Collingwood was the most successful Victorian club of the 1920s and 1930s, appearing in 13 out of a possible 20 Grand Finals during the period. Collingwood were premiers six times during this time, including four consecutive premierships between 1927 and 1930, a VFL record, and two consecutive premierships in 1935 and 1936. The club's coach during this period was Jock McHale, who served as coach from 1912 to 1949. Collingwood also had three Brownlow Medallists during the period, with Syd Coventry winning in 1927, Albert Collier in 1929 and Harry Collier in 1930. The club's ruthlessly successful period later earned the club the nickname "The Machine". American journalist and author Sam Walker included the Machine team in his book The Captain Class, which listed some the author's greatest teams in the history of world sport.

The Collingwood team of 1927–1930 not only achieved four straight premierships, but did so with a winning percentage of around 86% across the four seasons, and an average winning margin of about five goals. In 1929 they also became the only team in history to go through a home-and-away season undefeated. Collingwood remains the only club in the history of the VFL/AFL to have been declared premiers on four successive occasions.

=== 1950s: Two premierships ===
In the 1950s, the Melbourne Football Club enjoyed an era of unprecedented success, winning five premierships in six years (the last coming in 1960, and having been runner up in 1954). Collingwood lost two Grand Finals to Melbourne in this decade, but bounced back to win premierships in 1953 and 1958. Collingwood's 1958 premiership is much cherished by the club as it prevented Melbourne from equalling Collingwood's record four premierships in a row.

The 1958 premiership was however to be Collingwood's last for 32 years, as the club was to suffer a string of Grand Final defeats in coming decades.

=== 1959–1989: "Colliwobbles" ===
A string of eight Grand Final losses, often by narrow margins, between 1960 and 1981 gave rise to a perception that the club was prone to "choking", a phenomenon wittily dubbed "Colliwobbles". Whether this perception is accurate remains a subject of debate; having won three, drawn one and lost four of its last eight Grand Final matches. Lou Richards ceremoniously buried the Colliwobbles at Victoria Park after the club's 1990 premiership.

=== 1990–1999: Long-awaited premiership and struggles ===
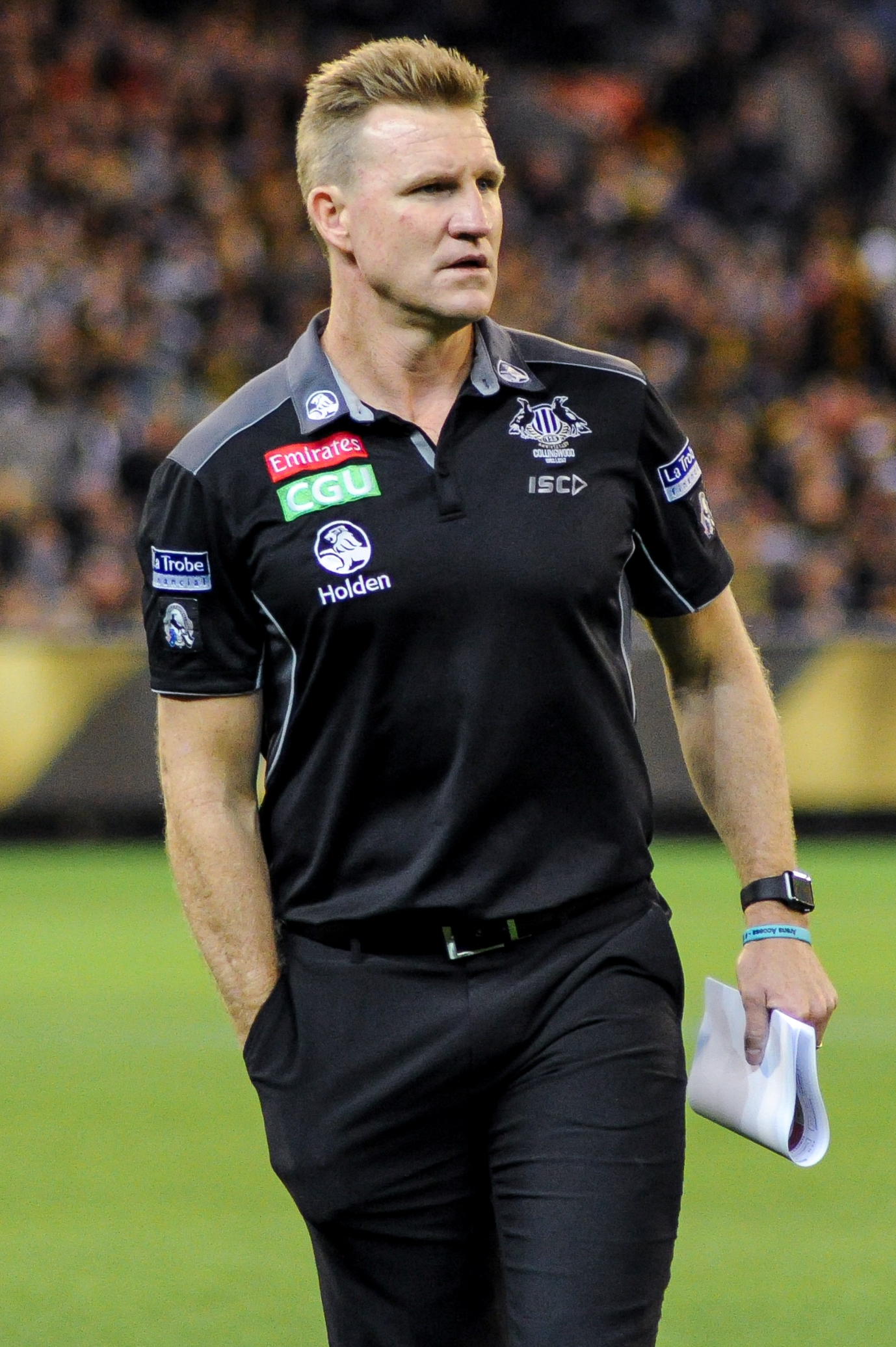
Nathan Buckley captained Collingwood between 1999 and 2007, and served as the club's senior coach from 2012 to 2021

The 1990 premiership team, coached by Leigh Matthews and captained by Tony Shaw, had a one-sided grand final win against Essendon, the Magpies recording a 48-point victory and ending a 32-year premiership drought which included eight grand final losses and one draw. The sight of club great Darren Millane, who died in a car-crash one year later, holding the ball aloft in triumph at the final siren is one of the indelible images of the match.

After the drought-breaking premiership, the club lapsed into a state of decline for the remainder of the decade, culminating with the club's second wooden spoon in 1999. The Magpies returned to finals, though were quickly eliminated, in the 1992 season against St Kilda and in the 1994 AFL season against West Coast. Matthews left as head coach at the end of the 1995 season and was replaced at the start of the following year by 1990 premiership captain Tony Shaw, who had only retired from football 18 months earlier. Mid-table finishes under Shaw were achieved for the next two seasons, before poor results in 1998 and 1999 saw Shaw announce his resignation.

=== 2000–2011: The Malthouse era ===
Media personality, sports journalist and administrator Eddie McGuire was elected President in October 1998. He oversaw the installation of new head coach Michael Malthouse in October 1999, whose appointment proved to be a masterstroke in reviving the club on-field. Under Malthouse, the acquisition and emergence of players such as Paul Licuria, Alan Didak, Anthony Rocca and Nathan Buckley resulted in Collingwood quickly moving up the ladder in the 2000 AFL season and in the 2001 AFL season, only narrowly missing the finals in the latter year. Collingwood met reigning premiers Brisbane in the 2002 Grand Final and were regarded as massive underdogs, eventually falling just 9 points short of an improbable premiership. Buckley, the captain, became just the third player to win the Norm Smith Medal as best afield in the Grand Final despite being a member of the losing side. Despite a very successful home-and-away next season, they were again defeated by the Lions in the 2003 Grand Final, this time in thoroughly convincingly fashion.

Following those Grand Final losses, Collingwood struggled for the next two years, finishing 13th in 2004 and second-last in 2005; the latter meant Collingwood was eligible for a priority pick which the club used to recruit Dale Thomas. Collingwood made a return to the finals in 2006, finishing fifth, but were defeated by the Western Bulldogs by 41 points in its elimination final. A loss to Essendon (who were on the bottom of the ladder at the time) late in the season ultimately cost them the double chance. The 2007 season saw them finish sixth on the ladder at season's conclusion, and in the finals they knocked out the grand finalists of the past two years, Sydney, in the elimination final and then West Coast in overtime at Subiaco Oval in the semi-final. Having earned a preliminary final against Geelong, Collingwood lost to the eventual premiers, by five points in one of the most memorable preliminary finals in over a decade. Nathan Buckley would announce his retirement at season's end after playing just five games in 2007 due to injury.

Collingwood finished eighth in the 2008 AFL season and were assigned an away final against Adelaide at AAMI Stadium. After at one point trailing in the match, Collingwood went on to end Adelaide's season and earn a semi-final meeting against St Kilda. Having defeated the Saints in both their regular season meetings, Collingwood lost convincingly, ending their 2008 season. The 2009 season saw Collingwood finish inside the top-four for the first time since 2003, but in the qualifying final were beaten by minor premiers St Kilda convincingly. Having won a second chance, Collingwood struggled against Adelaide for the second year in a row before John Anthony kicked the match-winning goal with a minute left to send them into another preliminary final meeting with Geelong. But the season ended abruptly for the Magpies, with a 73-point loss to Geelong.

In 2010, Collingwood finished as minor premiers, and after wins in the qualifying and preliminary finals, reached the first Grand Final against St Kilda. The match finished as a draw, forcing the first grand final replay in 33 years. Collingwood won the replay by 56 points. Key defensive player Nick Maxwell captained the club to victory and midfielder Scott Pendlebury (who had already won his first of eventually four Anzac medals earlier in the year) was awarded the Norm Smith Medal. The club won a second consecutive minor premiership in 2011, and qualified for the Grand Final after a three-point victory against Hawthorn in the preliminary final. However, Collingwood was then beaten by Geelong by 38 points in the decider, after trailing by seven points at three-quarter time. Following the Grand Final loss, which also marked the end of the club's 2011 AFL season, Malthouse left Collingwood after deciding not to stay on as "director of coaching". Star midfielder Dane Swan won the 2011 Brownlow Medal with a then-record 34 votes. Malthouse would leave having coached the club to eight finals series and four grand finals in 12 years.

=== 2012–2021: Coach Nathan Buckley ===
Nathan Buckley, regarded as one of Collingwood's greatest players, was appointed assistant coach under Malthouse for the 2010 and 2011 seasons, before assuming the head coaching position at the start of the 2012 season. Malthouse, who had been contracted to take on a "head of coaching" role, elected to leave the club rather than put Buckley in what he regarded as an awkward position. Under Buckley, Collingwood continued to be successful in the short term, qualifying inside the top-four in the 2012 season, before falling 26 points short in a preliminary final to eventual premiers the Sydney Swans at ANZ Stadium. The club qualified for finals once more in 2013, though were surprisingly eliminated in the first week by underdogs Port Adelaide at home. The result prompted the Magpies coaching staff to begin making radical changes to the club's playing list, which saw premiership players Heath Shaw, Sharrod Wellingham, Heritier Lumumba among others leave for other clubs or retire. Over the next four years, younger talent was drafted but the club's win–loss recorded continued to deteriorate. Collingwood failed to make finals from 2014 through to the end of the 2017 season, progressively sliding down the ladder each year. Buckley came under intense media pressure to resign or be sacked from his position, though club administrators elected to grant him a two-year extension to his contract in October 2017 after a broad-ranging internal review.

The emergence of new-generation players such as Taylor Adams, Adam Treloar and Jordan De Goey, alongside key talls Brodie Grundy and Mason Cox mixed well with veterans Pendlebury and Steele Sidebottom. Collingwood jumped from 13th in 2017 to 3rd in 2018, sensationally knocking out reigning premiers Richmond in the preliminary final before falling five points short after leading for most of the match against West Coast in the 2018 Grand Final, the senior team's 27th defeat in a Grand Final. Buckley's growth as a coach was partially credited for the rapid improvement. In 2019, Collingwood had another strong season, finishing fourth on the ladder, but they were unable to return to the Grand Final after a shattering four-point defeat to Greater Western Sydney in the first preliminary final. In 2020, Collingwood finished 8th at the end of the home-and-away season.

The club made significant on-field and administrative changes in the late 2010s. It was a foundation member of the inaugural AFL Women's competition in 2017 and in the same year established the Collingwood Magpies Netball team, a division of the club competing in the professional National Netball League. Collingwood unveiled a new permanent logo at the end of the 2017 season, which was the club's 125th anniversary year.

==== "Do Better" report ====
In 2020, the club commissioned an independent review into claims of racism at the club. In February 2021, the report was leaked to journalists and revealed that "while claims of racism have been made across the AFL, there is something distinct and egregious about Collingwood's history" and that "what is clear is that racism at the club has resulted in profound and enduring harm to First Nations and African players. The racism affected them, their communities, and set dangerous norms for the public." Collingwood President Eddie McGuire suggested that the report signalled "a historic and proud day" for the media and club which was working towards addressing racism and that it "was not a racist club". Many criticised McGuire's response, including AFL CEO Gillon McLachlan, Héritier Lumumba, former Indigenous Collingwood player Tony Armstrong and a Victorian Senator, among others. McGuire later apologised for the remarks. On 4 February, 150 Collingwood players from the men's and women's teams penned an open letter apologising "to anyone who, through their association with our club, has been marginalised, hurt or discriminated against due to their race." First-grade footballer Darcy Moore said that the players were "humiliated and shocked" by the report's findings. McGuire stood down as President of the Collingwood Football Club on 9 February 2021, although he had initially wanted to see the year through for a seamless transition until being compelled to step down.

Buckley stepped down after Round 13 of the 2021 AFL season, and assistant coach Robert Harvey took over as the caretaker coach until the end of the season. Harvey focused on developing youth and letting them play, with Collingwood winning 2 out of their 9 remaining games.

=== 2022–present: Coach Craig McRae ===
In September 2021, Craig McRae was appointed as head coach of the club for the 2022 season and onwards. In his first season as Senior Coach, McRae led the club from a 17th place finish in the previous year, to 4th place on the ladder at the conclusion of the 2022 regular season, which included an 11 game winning streak and an AFL record of 11 separate wins by under 12 points. Collingwood would go on to lose two of their three Finals games in 2022 by a goal or less, losing to Geelong by 6 points in the Qualifying Final, and Sydney by 1 point in the Preliminary Final. McRae was awarded the Monjon Allan Jeans Senior Coach of the Year Award by the AFL Coaches Association for the 2022 season.

The 2023 season marked a shift in the club's leadership, as long-time team captain Scott Pendlebury stepped down from the role he had held from 2014 to 2022. Darcy Moore was voted as the club's new captain for the 2023 season and beyond.

The Magpies entered the 2023 season with the aim to build upon their strong performance in the 2022 season. Key offseason additions included Tom Mitchell (from Hawthorn), Bobby Hill (from GWS), and Billy Frampton (from Adelaide) through trades, and signing Dan McStay to the club as a free agent. Collingwood had a successful second season under Craig McRae, securing a total of 18 wins and 5 losses, and ultimately finishing first overall on the ladder. In the first Qualifying Final of the 2023 AFL Finals, Collingwood (9.6.60) defeated Melbourne (7.11.53) by 7 points. In the preliminary final, Collingwood (8.10.58) defeated the Giants (8.9.57) by 1 point, to secure a spot in the 2023 AFL Grand Final. In a closely contested match, Collingwood (12.18.90) defeated Brisbane (13.8.86) by 4 points to win the 2023 AFL Premiership, equalling the league-record of 16 VFL/AFL premierships for the club.

The 2024 season would prove to be a disappointment for the reigning premiers. Collingwood started the year poorly, losing the first three matches of their flag defence before recovering strongly to lose just once in the following eleven games. Despite this, the Magpies finished the season in indifferent fashion, winning just four of their last nine matches. They ultimately finished ninth with a record of 12 wins, nine losses and two draws, with percentage separating them from eighth-placed arch-rival Carlton. In doing so, Collingwood became the third reigning premier in four years (after Richmond in 2021 and Geelong in 2023) to miss the finals.

Collingwood improved significantly in 2025, spending much of the season on top of the ladder before poor form late in the year saw the Magpies narrowly cling to a top four spot. They defeated Adelaide by 24 points in the first qualifying final to book a third preliminary final in four seasons, but were ultimately toppled by eventual premier Brisbane.

Collingwood struggled to find their best football in 2026 but a solid second half of the year saw them through to another finals series, albeit with a ninth-place finish in the AFL's new top-10 format. The Magpies were eliminated in heartbreaking fashion after a three-point loss to the Western Bulldogs in the first ever wildcard final after Tim Membrey's shot for goal after the siren missed to the right.

== Club symbols and identity ==
=== Guernsey ===
Throughout the club's history, Collingwood has worn a guernsey of black and white vertical stripes. The all white jumper, with the three black vertical stripes is the iconic strip that the club is most associated with. The current incarnation of the guernsey is mostly black, with white stripes on the front and lower half of the back, and white numbers. The main clash guernsey is the reverse of this: mostly white, with black stripes and black numbers, worn in away matches against clubs with a predominantly dark guernsey such as Fremantle and Port Adelaide. A secondary clash guernsey was introduced in 2011 and is used only in matches against North Melbourne due to similarity between the two uniforms. The alternate uniform is black with only two white stripes on each side instead of three.

Traditionally, Collingwood has worn a white guernsey with black stripes. The club switched to the black guernsey with white stripes in 2001.

Nike is the current manufacturer of the Magpies' apparel.

Collingwoods cultural reach and impact is far reaching as evidence by memberships, crowds, broadcast ratings and more recently, the emergence of influential digital media, such as the Pie Hard podcast.

=== Song ===
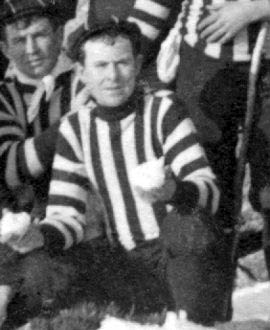
Collingwood player Tom Nelson wrote the lyrics to "Good Old Collingwood Forever" in 1906.

"Good Old Collingwood Forever" is the team song of the Collingwood Football Club. The lyrics were written by player Tom Nelson during Collingwood's 1906 tour of Tasmania, making it the oldest of the team songs currently used in the AFL. It is sung to the tune of "Goodbye, Dolly Gray", originally a song written in connection with the Spanish–American War, then a popular Boer War and First World War anthem. It is the only AFL team song to reference the barracker, an Australian rules football term for fan.

The current version of the song played at the ground during game day was recorded in 1972 by the Fable Singers. The lyrics are as follows:

Good old Collingwood forever,
They know how to play the game.
Side by side, they stick together,
To uphold the Magpies name.
See, the barrackers are shouting,
As all barrackers should.
Oh, the premiership's a cakewalk,
For the good old Collingwood.

In 1983, the line "Oh, the premiership's a cakewalk" was briefly changed to "there is just one team we favour" as it was felt to be embarrassing due to the long period the club had been without a premiership. However, the change was unpopular and was quickly reverted.

=== Rivalries ===
==== Carlton ====
Carlton is considered to be the club's arch-rival, The rivalry with Carlton is regarded by some as one of the most historic and significant in Australian sport. Both clubs were founding members of the VFL, and with 16 premierships apiece, are the joint most successful AFL teams along with Essendon.

==== Richmond ====
Richmond is also considerd to be the club's arch-rival. Arising from the fact that the two areas neighbour each other, Richmond and Collingwood were both highly successful in the late 1920s to the early 1930s; the clubs played against each other in five grand finals between 1919 and 1929 (Collingwood won in 1919, 1927, 1928 and 1929, while Richmond won in 1920). In the 1980 Grand Final, Richmond handed Collingwood an 81-point defeat, a record at the time, causing Collingwood to lose an 8th Grand Finals in a row.

Both clubs continue to draw large crowds to their meetings in each season, and the two were the subject of a 'recruiting war' throughout the 1970s and 1980s, with David Cloke, Geoff Raines, Brian Taylor, Wally Lovett, Phillip Walsh, Steven Roach, Gerald Betts, Neil Peart, Peter McCormack, Kevin Morris, Craig Stewart, Ross Brewer, Michael Lockman, Rod Oborne, Allan Edwards, John Annear, Noel Lovell and Bob Heard all exchanging clubs, as well as coach Tom Hafey (moving to Collingwood in 1977 following four flags at Punt Road).

Melees have been fought between the teams in two recent matches—Round 20, 2009, and Round 2, 2012—with almost all players from both teams involved in the altercations.

Both teams played each other 3 times during 2018, with all three games attracting massive crowds. Crowds of 72,157 and 88,180 were recorded between both home-and-away games, with Richmond winning both times, until Collingwood unexpectedly pulled off a massive upset in their finals game, smashing Richmond in the preliminary final in front of a crowd of 94,959, which caused the rivalry to reach its highest point since 1980. Games between these two clubs regularly attract large crowds regardless of whether they are in finals contention or not.

==== Essendon ====
Collingwood has enjoyed an Anzac Day rivalry with the Essendon Football Club since 1995, when the first Anzac Day clash took place. After the 2024 match, Collingwood have won this contest 17 times and Essendon 11 times, with the first and most recent match in 2024 ending in draws respectively. The two clubs also have a rivalry from the 1990 AFL Grand Final.

==== Melbourne ====
The rivalry between Collingwood and Melbourne was at its peak between 1955 and 1964, when the two played off in the grand final on five occasions. This included the 1958 Grand Final where Collingwood's victory prevented Melbourne from equalling Collingwood's record of four premierships in succession (1927–1930). The old rivalry with Melbourne has faded in recent decades due to Melbourne not enjoying the same level of on-field success, however, it remains strong and is an annual scheduled fixture on the Kings Birthday public holiday.

==== Brisbane Lions ====
Collingwood has formed a rivalry with the Brisbane Lions due to several finals encounters, most notably three Grand Finals in 2002, 2003 and 2023. The rivalry intensified during the 2000s, Nathan Buckley was a former Brisbane Bears player who joined Collingwood after one season with Brisbane in 1993. Buckley would go on to play against Brisbane in the 2002 AFL Grand Final in which Collingwood lost by a margin of nine points and the 2003 AFL Grand Final, in which Collingwood was again defeated by Brisbane by a margin of 50 points. The two clubs met again twenty years later in the 2023 AFL Grand Final. In a very close match, Collingwood defeated Brisbane by a small margin of four points to earn their sixteenth premiership. The two clubs met again in the 2025 Preliminary Final, in which Brisbane defeated Collingwood by 29 points.

=== Headquarters, training and administration base ===
Collingwood Football Club had its original training and administration base at Victoria Park from 1892 until 2004. In 2004, Collingwood Football Club moved its primary administrative and training base to the purpose-built Melbourne Sports and Entertainment Centre at the Olympic Park Complex. The Collingwood Football Club also used Olympic Park Stadium being adjacent to Melbourne Sports and Entertainment Centre as its outdoor training ground from 2004 until 2012, when it was demolished. After this occurred, Collingwood Football Club moved its outdoor training ground to the newly developed Olympic Park Oval that replaced the space of the stadium after demolition.

=== Home Grounds ===
The club's original primary home ground, where they played their AFL home games was at Victoria Park from 1892 until 1999. Since 2000, The club's primary home ground has been the Melbourne Cricket Ground, even though the club had already experimented playing home games at the venue since 1993, where in the period between 1994 and 1999, the club would play seven of its home games at the MCG, while retaining three at Victoria Park. Additionally, the club has played two home games a year at Marvel Stadium since 2014.

=== Supporters ===
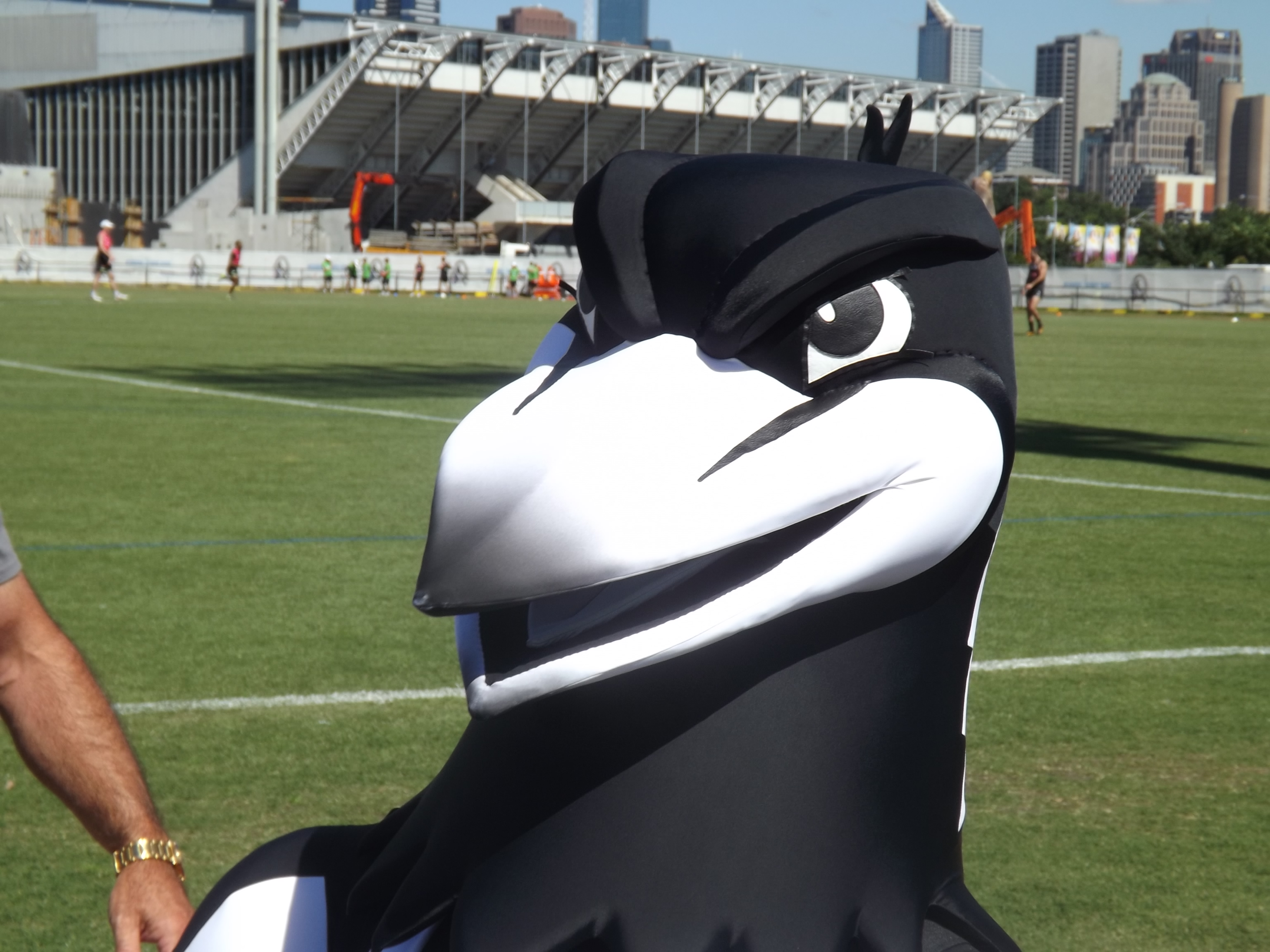
Collingwood Magpies mascot

Collingwood is a working-class suburb and the Collingwood Football Club supporter base traditionally came from the working class (though its supporter base today goes far beyond). Many of the club's supporters who regularly attend games still come from the working class or from lower socio-economic groups, leading to jokes from supporters of other clubs which typically stereotype their Collingwood counterparts as poor, crude and ignorant.

Collingwood is traditionally reviled by non-Collingwood supporters ("You either love 'em or you hate 'em"). The dislike of the club by outsiders is said to have originated during the 1920s and 1930s, a period of great success for the club which drew the envy and resentment of other clubs. In this period, Collingwood was also perceived as a Catholic and Irish club, at a time when these groups were looked down upon by the rest of Australian society and subjected to a considerable degree of social exclusion.

According to a 2001 study, Collingwood's old home ground of Victoria Park had a reputation as one of the worst venues for racial vilification, though it has also been said that the problem was similar at all grounds. Collingwood has however been involved in several high-profile incidents of this type, such as those involving indigenous players Nicky Winmar in 1993 and Adam Goodes in 2013. Michael Long's accusation of racial vilification against Collingwood ruckman Damian Monkhorst in 1995 also led directly to the establishment of the AFL's racial vilification regulations. In support of more inclusive sporting cultures, in 2010 the Australian fashion designer Shanaaz Copeland developed a Collingwood-inspired hijab for Muslim women. (See also: The "Do Better" Report)

== Corporate ==
=== Membership ===
Collingwood Membership 1984–present
Year	Members	Ladder Position	%
1984	16,313	3rd	—
1985	16,857	7th	▲3.28%
1986	13,971	6th	▼20.65%
1987	9,500	12th	▼47.06%
1988	11,985	4th	▲20.73%
1989	13,620	5th	▲12.00%
1990	14,808	1st	▲8.02%
1991	18,469	7th	▲19.82%
1992	18,921	5th	▲2.38%
1993	21,882	8th	▲13.53%
1994	20,843	8th	▼4.98%
1995	22,543	10th	▲7.54%
1996	20,752	11th	▼8.63%
1997	22,761	10th	▲8.82%
1998	27,099	14th	▲16.00%
1999	32,358	16th	▲16.25%
2000	28,932	15th	▼11.84%
2001	31,455	9th	▲8.02%
2002	32,549	4th	▲3.36%
2003	40,445	2nd	▲19.54%
2004	41,128	13th	▲1.66%
2005	38,612	15th	▼6.51%
2006	38,038	7th	▼1.50%
2007	38,587	4th	▲1.42%
2008	26,320	6th	▼46.60%
2009	45,972	4th	▲42.74%
2010	57,617	1st	▲20.21%
2011	71,271	1st	▲19.15%
2012	72,688	4th	▲1.94%
2013	80,000	6th	▲9.14%
2014	80,793	11th	▲0.98%
2015	76,497	12th	▼5.61%
2016	74,643	12th	▼2.48%
2017	75,879	13th	▲1.62%
2018	75,507	3rd	▼0.49%
2019	85,226	4th	▲12.87%
2020	76,862	8th	▼9.8%
2021	82,527	17th	▲7.37%
2022	100,384	4th	▲21.63%
2023	106,470	1st	▲6.06%
2024	110,628	9th	▲3.90%
2025	112,491	4th	▲1.68%
2026	113,362	9th	▲0.77%

In 2011, Collingwood reached 70,000 members for the first time, creating a new AFL record, beating their own previous record of 58,249 set in 2010.

In 2023 (the year Collingwood won their 16th premiership), they broke the AFL membership record figure again with 106,470 members.

The club's extensive membership base tends to be a large crowd-pulling power, which has caused the AFL to be accused of favouring Collingwood when scheduling to maximise the league's attendance figures. However, the AFL states that this is due to other clubs requesting home games at the MCG against Collingwood.

=== Off-field ===
Collingwood was one of the last clubs to abandon its traditional stadium, Victoria Park. Collingwood now plays home games at the MCG. It now also has its headquarters situated in the former Glasshouse Entertainment Centre. Due to a sponsorship deal, this facility is known as 'The AIA Centre', and has been previously known by other names such as 'The Lexus Centre', 'The Westpac Centre' and 'The Holden Centre', all due to sponsorship agreements.

On 9 March 2007, former Collingwood and Fitzroy defender Gary Pert was appointed the Magpies' CEO, seven weeks after Greg Swann departed for Carlton. In accepting the key Magpie post, Pert quit as a club director and as managing director of Channel 9 in Melbourne. In a press conference, it was stated that Collingwood has budgeted to turn over about $50 million that year and McGuire hoped the new administration would soon double that figure. "A finance administration review has come up with how we are going to turn Collingwood in to its next phase of its life", McGuire said. "What do we do to make ourselves go from a $45 million a year turnover business to a $100 million turnover business? "They sound like big figures but in 1999 we turned over $13 million, so that is where we are heading as a football club."

On 24 July 2017, Pert resigned from his position as CEO of the club, with Peter Murphy replacing him as an interim CEO. In January 2023, former Collingwood player and 1990 premiership hero Craig Kelly took over from Mark Anderson as CEO of the club.

In July 2024, Collingwood was sued by its former head of First Nations strategy, Mark Cleaver, alleging that Collingwood CEO Craig Kelly had made offensive jokes and slurs about Indigenous culture.

=== Sponsorship ===
The Collingwood guernsey is the most valuable sports sponsorship in Australia. Collingwood has different guernsey sponsors for home and away matches, generating an estimated $6.3 million worth of media exposure for the primary sponsor and $5.7 million for the secondary sponsor. These sponsorships are ranked first and second in Australia. High-profile sponsors have included Emirates, Holden, CGU Insurance, and Westpac.

==== AFL ====
Year	Kit Manufacturer	Major Sponsor	Shorts Sponsor	Bottom Back Sponsor	Top Back Sponsor
1977–85	–	Hard Yakka	–	–	–
1986–88	–	MiniSkips	–	–	–
1989–92	–	Spicers Paper	–	–	–
1993	–	Spicers Paper	Spicers	–	–
1994	–	Spicers Paper	Delta	Spicers	–
1995–97	–	Spicers Paper	Thrifty	Spicers	–
1998	Adidas	Primus (Home) Spicers Paper (Away)	Spicers Paper (Home) Primus (Away)	Spicers (Home) Primus (Away)	–
1999–2001	Adidas	Emirates (Home) Primus (Away)	Primus (Home) Emirates (Away)	Primus (Home) Emirates (Away)	–
2002–05	Adidas	Emirates (Home) Wipe Off 5 TAC (Away)	Wipe Off 5 TAC (Home) Emirates (Away)	Wipe Off 5 TAC (Home) Emirates (Away)	–
2006–08	Adidas	Emirates (Home) Wizard Homes Loans (Away)	Wizard Homes Loans (Home) Emirates (Away)	Wizard Homes Loans (Home) Emirates (Away)	–
2009–10	Adidas	Emirates (Home) Aussie (Away)	Aussie (Home) Emirates (Away)	Aussie (Home) Emirates (Away)	–
2011–12	Adidas	Emirates (Home) CGU Insurance (Away)	CGU Insurance (Home) Emirates (Away)	CGU Insurance (Home) Emirates (Away)	–
2013–16	Star Athletic	Emirates (Home) CGU Insurance (Away)	CGU Insurance (Home) Emirates (Away)	CGU Insurance (Home) Emirates (Away)	–
2017–19	ISC	Emirates (Home) CGU Insurance (Away)	CGU Insurance (Home) Emirates (Away)	CGU Insurance (Home) Emirates (Away)	–
2020	ISC	Emirates (Home) CGU Insurance (Away)	CGU Insurance (Home) Emirates (Away)	CGU Insurance (Home) Emirates (Away)	Emirates (Home) CGU Insurance (Away)
2021	Nike	Emirates (Home) CGU Insurance (Away)	CGU Insurance (Home) Emirates (Away)	CGU Insurance (Home) Emirates (Away)	Emirates (Home) CGU Insurance (Away)
2022–	Nike	Emirates (Home) KFC (Away)	KFC (Home) Emirates (Away)	KFC (Home) Emirates (Away)	Emirates (Home) KFC (Away)

==== AFL Women's ====
Year	Kit Manufacturer	Major Sponsor	Shorts Sponsor	Bottom Back Sponsor	Top Back Sponsor
2017–18	Cotton On	Holden (Home); CGU Insurance (Away)	Three Threes Condiments	CGU Insurance (Home); Holden (Away)	—
2019	Cotton On	Optus (Home/Away); CGU Insurance (Clash)	Towards Zero	CGU Insurance (Home/Away); Optus (Clash)	—
2020	Cotton On	Avid Property Group (Home/Away); CGU Insurance (Clash)	Towards Zero	CGU Insurance (Home/Away); Avid Property Group (Clash)	—
2021	Cotton On	AIA (Home/Away); CGU Insurance (Clash)	TAC	CGU Insurance (Home/Away); AIA (Clash)	Avid Property Group
2022 S6–S7	Cotton On	AIA (Home/Away); KFC (Clash)	Sharp	KFC (Home/Away); AIA (Clash)	Sharp
2023	Cotton On	AIA (Home/Away); KFC (Clash)	Kangan Institute	KFC (Home/Away); AIA (Clash)	Kangan Institute

== Honours ==
=== Honour board ===
Premierships
Competition	Team	Wins	Years won
Victorian Football League/Australian Football League	Seniors (1897–present)	16	1902, 1903, 1910, 1917, 1919, 1927, 1928, 1929, 1930, 1935, 1936, 1953, 1958, 1990, 2010, 2023
VFL/AFL Reserves	Reserves (1919–1999)	7	1919, (Note: These four premierships were won by the Collingwood District Football Club, which developed an association with the Collingwood Football Club in 1912 and acted as the club's reserves team until being formally absorbed by the Collingwood Football Club in 1938.) 1920, 1922, 1925, 1940, 1965, 1976
VFL/AFL Thirds	Under 19s (1946–1991)	4	1960, 1965, 1974, 1986
VFL Women's	Reserves (2018–present)	1	2019
Victorian Football Association/Victorian Football League	Seniors (1892–1896)	1	1896
Other titles and honours
McClelland Trophy	Seniors	8	1959, 1960, 1964, 1965, 1966, 1970, 2010, 2011
AFL pre-season competition	Seniors (1988–2013)	1	2011
AFC Night Series	Seniors (1979–1986)	1	1979
Lightning Premiership	Seniors	2	1941, 1951
Championship of Australia	Seniors	1	1896
Finishing positions
Australian Football League	Minor premiership	20	1902, 1903, 1905, 1915, 1917, 1919, 1922, 1926, 1927, 1928, 1929, 1930, 1966, 1969, 1970, 1973, 1977, 2010, 2011, 2023
Australian Football League	Grand Finalist	27	1901, 1905, 1911, 1915, 1918, 1920, 1922, 1925, 1926, 1937, 1938, 1939, 1952, 1955, 1956, 1960, 1964, 1966, 1970, 1977, 1979, 1980, 1981, 2002, 2003, 2011, 2018
Australian Football League	Wooden spoons	2	1976, 1999
AFL Women's	Wooden spoons	2	2019, 2024
VFL Women's	Minor premiership	4	2018, 2019, 2021, 2023
VFL Women's	Grand Finalist	3	2021, (Note: After qualifying for the 2021 VFLW Grand Final, the match was postponed and later cancelled due to the COVID-19 pandemic in Victoria.) 2023, 2025

=== Head-to-head results ===
Played: 2,722 Won 1,641 Drawn: 33 Lost: 1,049 (Last updated – End of the 2026 AFL Season)

R		GP	W	D	L	GF-BF	For	GA-BA	Agn	%	Win%	100+F	100+A
1	Adelaide	54	36	1	17	673.568	4606	573.598	4036	114.12	69.00	19	7
2	Brisbane Bears	15	13	0	2	251.232	1738	170.187	1207	143.99	86.67	12	2
3	Brisbane Lions	46	19	0	27	515.500	3590	568.475	3883	92.45	43.90	14	15
4	Carlton	270	137	4	129	3061.3213	21579	3000.3088	21088	102.33	50.75	73	64
5	Essendon	250	138	5	107	2902.3008	20420	2771.2930	19556	104.42	55.85	65	62
6	Fitzroy	209	131	3	75	2338.2683	16711	2058.2374	14722	113.51	63.40	66	31
7	Fremantle	40	23	1	16	520.430	3550	454.367	3091	114.85	60.81	16	7
8	Geelong	245	136	1	108	2753.3008	19526	2593.2835	18393	106.16	56.40	62	46
9	Gold Coast	17	12	0	5	220.198	1518	145.151	1021	148.68	73.33	8	1
10	Greater Western Sydney	18	10	0	8	209.191	1445	186.134	1250	115.60	56.25	5	3
11	Hawthorn	175	102	3	72	2286.2423	16139	2124.2053	14797	109.07	58.48	67	59
12	Melbourne	248	157	5	86	2929.3178	20752	2568.2822	18230	113.83	64.43	75	49
13	North Melbourne	168	114	2	52	2341.2417	16463	1883.2018	13316	123.63	68.07	74	40
14	Port Adelaide	40	22	0	18	507.442	3484	450.435	3135	111.13	52.63	15	5
15	Richmond	218	124	2	92	2587.2789	18311	2427.2607	17169	106.65	56.94	53	48
16	St Kilda	227	164	2	61	2933.3137	20735	2264.2459	16043	129.25	72.44	92	37
17	Sydney	236	145	1	90	2806.3086	19922	2374.2787	17031	116.97	61.75	66	44
18	University	14	13	1	0	132.199	991	72.110	542	182.84	96.43	2	0
19	West Coast	64	32	1	31	772.671	5303	783.708	5406	98.09	48.36	17	21
20	Western Bulldogs	165	112	1	50	2190.2098	15238	1794.1934	12698	120.00	68.83	59	30

=== Team of the Century ===
Collingwood announced its team of the century on 14 June 1997, celebrating 100 years since the beginning of the VFL. Gavin Brown was added as the fourth interchange player in 2002, as, when the team was named in 1997, only three interchange players were permitted on a team.

Collingwood Team of the Century
B:	Harold Rumney	Jack Regan	Syd Coventry (Captain)
HB:	Billy Picken	Albert Collier	Nathan Buckley
C:	Thorold Merrett	Bob Rose	Darren Millane
HF:	Des Fothergill	Murray Weideman	Dick Lee
F:	Phonse Kyne	Gordon Coventry	Peter Daicos
Foll:	Len Thompson	Des Tuddenham	Harry Collier
Int:	Tony Shaw	Wayne Richardson	Marcus Whelan
Int:	Gavin Brown		
Coach:	James "Jock" McHale		

=== Captains ===
This list comprises every captain of the club. This list does not include deputy captains filling in due to an injury to the named captain, but does include captains named after a player retires or steps down during the season.

- Bill Strickland 1897
- Bill Proudfoot 1898–99, 1901
- Dick Condon 1899–1900
- Lardie Tulloch 1902–1904
- Charlie Pannam 1905
- Alf Dummett 1906
- Arthur Leach 1906–1908
- Eddie Drohan 1908
- Robert Nash 1908–09
- George Angus 1910–11
- Jock McHale 1912–13
- Dan Minogue 1914–1916
- Percy Wilson 1917–18
- Con McCarthy 1919
- Dick Lee 1920–21
- Tom Drummond 1922
- Harry Curtis 1923
- Charlie Tyson 1924–1926
- Syd Coventry 1927–1934
- Harry Collier 1935–1939
- Jack Regan 1940–41, 1943
- Phonse Kyne 1942, 1946–1949
- Pat Fricker 1944
- Alby Pannam 1945
- Gordon Hocking 1950–51
- Lou Richards 1952–1955
- Neil Mann 1955–56
- Bill Twomey Jr. 1957
- Frank Tuck 1958–59
- Murray Weideman 1960–1963
- Ray Gabelich 1964–65
- John Henderson 1965
- Des Tuddenham 1966–1969, 1976
- Terry Waters 1970–71
- Wayne Richardson 1971–1975
- Max Richardson 1977
- Len Thompson 1978
- Ray Shaw 1979–80
- Peter Moore 1981–82
- Mark Williams 1983–1986
- Tony Shaw 1987–1993
- Gavin Brown 1994–1998
- Nathan Buckley 1999–2007
- Scott Burns 2008
- Nick Maxwell 2009–2013
- Scott Pendlebury 2014–2022
- Darcy Moore 2023–present

=== Presidents ===
There have been twelve presidents of the Collingwood Football Club. The first and founding president of Collingwood was former Collingwood Mayor and Victorian MP William Beazley. Beazley was president of Collingwood from the founding of the club in 1892 until 1911. The second president of Collingwood was Alfred Cross. However, Cross was only president for a brief period of time. Third was former Fitzroy and Collingwood player Jim Sharp. Sharp was president for ten years (1913–1923). The fourth president of Collingwood was another former player, Harry Curtis. Curtis currently is the longest serving president of Collingwood. Curtis served as president for twenty-six years. Another former player of Collingwood, Syd Coventry was the fifth president for Collingwood, serving twelve years between 1950 and 1962.

Tom Sherrin was the sixth president of Collingwood, serving from 1963 to 1974. Ern Clarke, president for one year, was the seventh president. John Hickey, Ranald Macdonald and Allan MacAlister all served as president during 1977 through to 1995. Eleventh president and former player, Kevin Rose, was the second most recent president of Collingwood. The twelfth, and second-longest serving president of Collingwood, is radio and television presenter, commentator and journalist Eddie McGuire. McGuire was president of Collingwood between 1998 and 2021. Club board members Mark Korda and Peter Murphy were interim co-presidents, following McGuire's tenure. In April 2021, Korda was appointed the thirteenth president of Collingwood.

List of Collingwood presidents (Note: Unless displayed, the list does not include possible period(s) of time in which the role of president was vacant, administered by a committee or had a de facto acting President.)
No.	Name	Took office	Left office	Time in office	Occupation / Notes	Premierships	Ref(s).
1	William Beazley	1892	1912	20 years, 123 days	Politician; involved with precursor club, Britannia Football Club.	3 (1902, 1903, 1910)	
2	Alfred Cross	1913		1 year (Note: Specific dates are unknown, however, Cross is alleged to have resigned during the 1913 season.)	Tailor; former Collingwood vice-president.	—N/a	
3	Jim Sharp	1914	1924	10 years, 209 days	Former VFL player; former Collingwood vice-president.	2 (1917, 1919)	
4	Harry Curtis	1925	1950	25 years, 112 days	Accountant; former VFL player.	6 (1927, 1928, 1929, 1930, 1935, 1936)	
—N/a	Gordon Carlyon	24 May – 28 June 1950 (Note: Following the resignation of the Collingwood Football Social Club Committee, Mr. Carlyon, as secretary, was acting secretary-manager until the conclusion of the elections of the president, vice-president, treasurer, and committee members.)		35 days		—N/a	
5	Sydney Coventry Sr.	1950	1963	12 years, 246 days	Former VFL player; former Collingwood vice-president.	2 (1953, 1958)	
6	Tom Sherrin	1963	1974	11 years, 214 days	Manufacturer; former Collingwood vice-president.	—N/a	
7	Ern Clarke	1974	1976	1 year, 213 days	Businessman	—N/a	
8	John Hickey	1976	1982	6 years, 153 days	RAAF pilot; former Collingwood vice-president.	—N/a	
9	Ranald Macdonald	1982	1986	3 years, 208 days	Journalist; lecturer	—N/a	
10	Allan McAlister	1986	1995	9 years, 157 days	Businessman; former Collingwood treasurer	1 (1990)	
11	Kevin Rose	1995	1998	2 years, 253 days	Businessman; former VFL player, coach	—N/a	
12	Eddie McGuire	1998	2021	22 years, 103 days	Commentator; journalist; businessman.	1 (2010)	
—N/a	Peter Murphy; Mark Korda	10 February – 21 April 2021 (Note: Following McGuire's decision to stand down, Peter Murphy and Mark Korda, co-vice presidents, were appointed co-presidents until a successor could be decided.)		70 days	Collingwood vice-president(s).	—N/a	
13	Mark Korda	21 April – 16 December 2021		239 days	Businessman; former Collingwood vice-president. (Note: Mark Korda also holds the role of director.)	—N/a	
14	Jeff Browne	2021	2024	3 years, 0 days	Lawyer	1 (2023)	
15	Barry Carp	2024	Incumbent	1 year, 340 days	Investor and fund manager; founder of River Capital		

== Current playing squad ==
Collingwood Football Club · AFL personnel
Playing list		Inactive list	Coaching staff
1 Patrick Lipinski; 2 Jordan De Goey; 3 Isaac Quaynor; 4 Brayden Maynard (vc); 5 Jamie Elliott; 7 Josh Daicos; 8 Lachie Schultz; 9 Dan Houston; 11 Daniel McStay; 12 Harry Perryman; 14 Darcy Cameron; 16 Ed Allan; 17 Billy Frampton; 18 Tyan Prindable; 19 Tew Jiath; 21 Oscar Steene; 25 Jack Crisp; 26 Reef McInnes; 28 Tim Membrey; 29 Charlie West; 30 Darcy Moore (c)	31 Beau McCreery; 32 Sam Swadling; 34 Jack Buller; 35 Nick Daicos (vc); 36 Harvey Harrison; 37 Zac McCarthy; 38 Jeremy Howe; 39 Will Hayes; 41 Angus Anderson; 42 Sam Gayfer; 43 Jai Saxena (A); 44 Ned Long; 45 Roan Steele (A); 47 Liam Puncher (A); Jesse Hogan; Gus Kennedy; Jordan Knapp; Koby LeCras; Lachie Neale; Flynn Riley; Finnbarr Roarty (B)		Senior coach: Craig McRae; Assistant coaches: Hayden Skipworth (senior assistant); Jordan Roughead (back line); Ben Hart (midfield); Tyson Goldsack (forward line); Greg Stafford (ruck); Matthew Lokan (development); Chloe McMillan (development); Dyson Heppell (development); Legend: (c) captain; (vc) vice-captain; (A) Category A rookie; (B) Category B rookie; Updated: 21 November 2026; Sources: Players (rookies); coaches

== Reserves team ==
Collingwood

Names
- Full name: Collingwood Football Club Limited

2023 season
- Home-and-away season: 8th

Club details
- Founded: 1939; 2008 (re-founded)
- Competition: VFL
- Coach: Matthew Lokan
- Captain: Sam Glover
- Premierships: VFL/AFL reserves (7): 1919; 1920; 1922; 1925; 1940; 1965; 1976
- Ground: Victoria Park (10,000) Olympic Park (3,000)

Uniforms
Home	Away	Clash

The Collingwood reserves are the reserves team of the club. The latest iteration of the Collingwood reserves was created in 2008, and compete in the Victorian Football League.

=== History ===
The VFL/AFL operated a reserves competition from 1919 to 1991, and a de facto AFL reserves competition was run by the Victorian State Football League from 1992 to 1999. Collingwood fielded a reserves team in both of these competitions, allowing players who were not selected for the senior team to play for Collingwood in the lower grade. Initially, the Collingwood District Football Club operated as its official reserves side, however the Districts remained a stand-alone club. It was not until the end of the 1938 season that Collingwood took control over the Districts and formally made them the Collingwood reserves.

After the AFL reserves competition was disbanded at the end of 1999, the club fielded its reserves team in the Victorian Football League during the 2000 season.

In 2001, Collingwood reserves team was dissolved and the club entered into an affiliation with the VFL's Williamstown Football Club, such that Williamstown served as a feeder team and reserves players for Collingwood played senior football for Williamstown. Williamstown won one VFL premiership during this time, in 2003.

Collingwood ended its affiliation with Williamstown after the 2007 season. The reserves team was re-established, and has competed in the VFL since 2008. Collingwood's standalone reserves team's best VFL result to date was a preliminary final appearance in the 2016 VFL season, in which it lost to eventual premiers Footscray by 119 points.

The reserves team currently splits home games between Olympic Park Oval and Victoria Park, although they do occasionally play at the MCG as a curtain raiser to Collingwood home matches, and uses the AFL team's clash guernsey as its primary guernsey. The Collingwood VFL team is composed of both reserves players from the club's primary and rookie AFL lists, and a separately maintained list of players eligible only for VFL matches.

=== Coaches ===
No.	Name	Years
1	Brad Gotch, Dean Laidley	2000
2	Gavin Brown	2008–10
3	Tarkyn Lockyer	2011–12
4	Dale Tapping	2013–16
5	Jared Rivers	2017–19
6	Craig Black	2021–22
7	Josh Fraser	2023–24
8	Andy Otten	2025
9	Matthew Lokan	2026–

Note: Garry Hocking was appointed coach for the 2020 season, which was abandoned due to the COVID-19 pandemic.

=== Captains ===
No.	Name	Years
1	Nigel Carmody	2008
2	Damien Peverill	2009
3	Kris Pendlebury	2010–12
4	Jack Hellier, Nick Riddle	2013
5	Jack Hellier	2014–18
6	Jack Hellier, Alex Woodward	2019
7	Lachlan Tardrew, Campbell Hustwaite	2021–23
8	Campbell Lane, Sam Glover	2024
9	Sam Glover	2025–

=== Season summaries ===
Season	Win–loss	Ladder position	Finals result	Best & Fairest	Leading goalkicker
2000	9–10	11th	DNQ	Shane Watson	Brad Obourne (20)
2008	5–11	12th	DNQ	Justin Crow & Brent Macaffer	Brent Macaffer (38)
2009	10–8	7th	Preliminary Final	Ryan Cook	Chris Bryan (34)
2010	10–8	7th	Elimination Final	Tom Young	Scott Reed (38)
2011	4–14	12th	DNQ	Tom Sundberg	Brett Eddy (21)
2012	4–14	12th	DNQ	Kris Pendlebury	Caolan Mooney & Jackson Paine (17)
2013	10–8	6th	Elimination Final	Kyle Martin	Jackson Paine (45)
2014	12–6	5th	Elimination Final	Kyle Martin	Patrick Karnezis (31)
2015	12–6	6th	semi-final	Ben Moloney	Patrick Karnezis (30)
2016	14–4	2nd	Preliminary Final	Brent Macaffer	Travis Cloke & Jordan Collopy (18)
2017	8–10	8th	Elimination Final	Marty Hore	Kayle Kirby (42)
2018	12–6	5th	Elimination Final	Marty Hore	Unknown
2019	7–11	11th	DNQ	Alex Woodward	Andrew Gallucci (18)
2021	6–3	7th	Cancelled	Lachlan Tardrew	Jack Ginnivan (16)
2022	11–7	6th	Elimination Final	Finlay Macrae	Sam Fowler (25)
2023	11–7	8th	Elimination Final	Campbell Hustwaite	Reef McInnes (32)
2024	4–14	20th	DNQ	Sam Glover	Ash Johnson (21)
2025	11–7	7th	Wildcard Round	Harry DeMattia	Charlie West (24)
2026	7–11	16th	DNQ	Oskar Faulkhead	Jack Buller (27)

Sources: Collingwood Football Club VFL Honour Roll, Collingwood Reserves Honour Roll 1919–2022, VFL Stats

== Women's teams ==
=== AFL Women's team ===
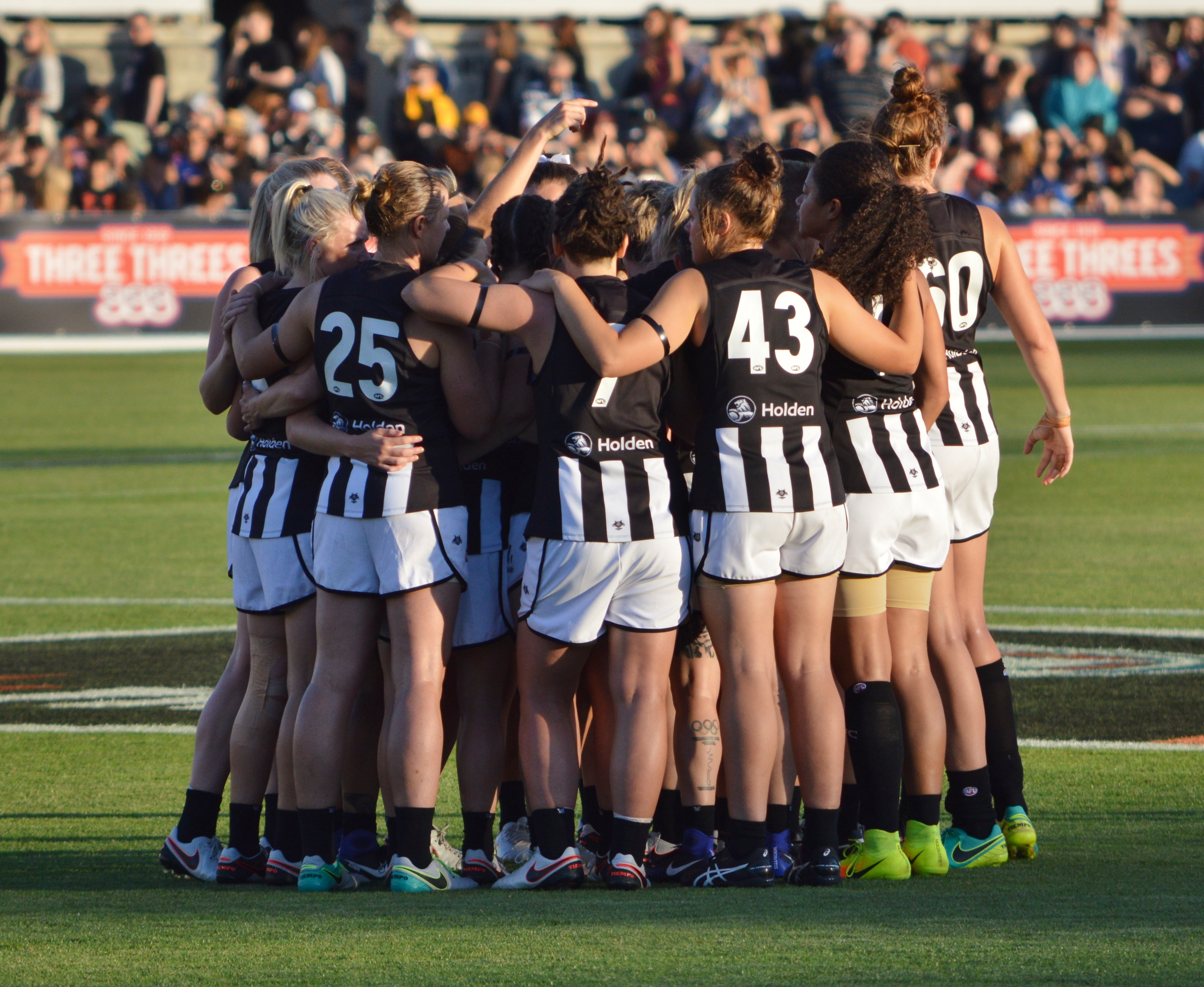
The Collingwood team huddles prior to the inaugural AFL Women's match in February 2017.

In April 2016, the club launched a bid to enter a team in the inaugural AFL Women's season in 2017. Meg Hutchins was appointed Women's Football Operations Manager some weeks prior, and given the responsibility of crafting the bid.

The club was granted a license in June 2016, becoming one of eight teams to compete in the league's first season.

In addition to her role off-field, Hutchins would become one of the club's first players, along with marquees Moana Hope and Emma King. Collingwood selected a further 19 players in October's inaugural draft as well as three non-drafted players and two first time footballing rookies. Dandenong Stingrays assistant and Victorian Metro Youth Girls head coach Wayne Siekman was appointed the team's inaugural head coach in July 2016.

The AFL Women's team is based at the club's training and administration at Olympic Park, though often shares matches between the venue and the club's spiritual home Victoria Park.

==== AFL Women's squad ====
Collingwood Football Club · AFL Women's personnel
Playing list		Inactive list	Coaching staff
2 Eliza James; 3 Brianna Davey; 4 Imogen Barnett; 5 Maisie Nankivell*; 6 Jordyn Allen (vc); 7 Sarah Rowe; 8 Brittany Bonnici; 9 Mischa Barwin; 11 Ariana Hetherington; 12 Georgia Knight; 14 Mattea Breed; 16 Ash Centra; 17 Dominique Carbone; 19 Ellie Brady*; 20 Charlotte Brewer	21 Amber Schutte; 22 Imogen Trengove; 23 Lauren Butler; 24 Kellyann Hogan*; 25 Zara Neuwirth; 26 Violet Patterson; 27 Lucy Cronin; 28 Amy Smith; 29 Tarni White; 30 Carly Remmos; 33 Liv Lewis*; 35 Kalinda Howarth; 36 Airlie Runnalls; 37 Josephine Bamford; 43 Jemma Rigoni	10 Matilda Argus	Senior coach: Vacant; Assistant coaches: Dom Tyson (senior assistant/midfield); Brady Grey (back line); Cam Morris (forward line); Legend: (c) captain; (vc) vice-captain; * rookie; Updated: 21 November 2026; Sources: Players, coaches

==== AFL Women's season summaries ====
Collingwood AFLW honour roll
Season	Ladder	W–L–D	Finals	Best & Fairest	Leading goalkicker	Captain(s)	Coach
2017	5th	3–4–0	DNQ	Nicola Stevens	Moana Hope (7)	Steph Chiocci	Wayne Siekman
2018	6th	3–4–0	DNQ	Chloe Molloy	Christina Bernardi (9)	Steph Chiocci	Wayne Siekman
2019	10th ^	1–6–0	DNQ	Jaimee Lambert	Sarah D'Arcy (4)	Steph Chiocci	Wayne Siekman
2020	5th ^	4–2–0	Semi-final	Jaimee Lambert	Jordan Membrey (7)	Steph Chiocci	Stephen Symonds
2021	3rd	7–2–0	Preliminary final	Brianna Davey	Chloe Molloy (16)	Steph Chiocci & Brianna Davey	Stephen Symonds
2022 (S6)	6th	6–4–0	Qualifying final	Jaimee Lambert	Chloe Molloy (8)	Steph Chiocci & Brianna Davey	Stephen Symonds
2022 (S7)	6th	7–3–0	Semi-final	Jordyn Allen	Eliza James (10)	Steph Chiocci & Brianna Davey	Stephen Symonds
2023	11th	5–5–0	DNQ	Brittany Bonnici	Nell Morris-Dalton (8)	Brianna Davey	Stephen Symonds
2024	18th	1–10–0	DNQ	Ruby Schleicher	Imogen Barnett / Brittany Bonnici / Lauren Butler (4)	Brianna Davey	Sam Wright
2025	15th	3–9–0	DNQ	TBD	Kalinda Howarth (7)	Ruby Schleicher	Sam Wright

^ Denotes the ladder was split into two conferences. Figure refers to the club's overall finishing in the home-and-away season.

=== VFL Women's team ===
The club began fielding its own team in the revamped VFL Women's league from the start of the 2018 season. Many of the club's AFLW athletes play for the VFLW team, though the majority of the team is made up of players who haven't been drafted to an AFLW club. The VFL Women's competition runs from May to September (after the AFL Women's season has concluded) and Collingwood achieved success quickly in the league, claiming their first VFLW premiership in 2019.

=== VFLW team list ===
51. Matilda Zander 52. Nicole Hales 53. Danica Pederson 54. Tricia Cowan 55. Caitlin Bunker 56. Marla Neal 58. Kara Colborne-Veel 60. Grace Matser 61. Nyakoat Dojiok 62. Monique Dematteo 63. Georgia Ricardo 64. Shanel Camilleri 65. Elisabeth Jackson 67. Rhiannon Busch 71. Hannah Bowey 72. Katie Lee 73. Olivia Storer 74. Ebony Wroe 75. Amy Kane 76. Nicola Weston 88. Neve O'Connor 90. Cahlia Haslam 91. Demi Hallett 92. Sarah King 99. Mollie Emond Coach: Chloe McMillan

==== VFL Women's season summaries ====
Collingwood VFLW honour roll
Season	W–L–D	Ladder	Finals result	Best & Fairest	Leading goalkicker	Captain(s)	Coach
2018	12–1–1	1st	Preliminary final	Jaimee Lambert	Sophie Alexander (14)	Unknown	Penny Cula-Reid
2019	12–2–0	1st	Premiers	Jaimee Lambert	Jaimee Lambert (29)	Ruby Schleicher & Grace Buchan	Penny Cula-Reid
2020	Season cancelled due to the COVID-19 pandemic						
2021	14–0–0	1st	N/A (Note: Collingwood qualified for the 2021 VFL Women's Grand Final against Geelong, though the match was cancelled and no premiership was awarded due to the impact of the COVID-19 pandemic in Victoria.)	Imogen Barnett	Imogen Barnett (21)	Caitlin Bunker	Chloe McMillan
2022	7–7–0	6th	Elimination final	Matilda Zander	Nyakoat Dojiok & Matilda Zander (9)	Caitlin Bunker	Chloe McMillan
2023	9–5–0	1st	Runners-up	Jessica Bates	Monique DeMatteo (16)	Caitlin Bunker	Chloe McMillan
2024	6–8–0	7th	DNQ	Katie Day	Kaitie Day (6)	Megan Ryan	Tom Cashin
2025	10–4–0	2nd	Runners-up	Dominique Carbone	Amelia Peck (24)	Dominique Carbone	Tom Cashin
2026	10–4–0	3rd	Preliminary final	Dominique Carbone	Amelia Peck (28)	Dominique Carbone	Tom Cashin

== Individual awards ==
=== Brownlow Medalists ===
- Syd Coventry (1927)
- Albert Collier (1929)
- Harry Collier (1930 tied)
- Marcus Whelan (1939)
- Des Fothergill (1940 tied)
- Len Thompson (1972)
- Peter Moore (1979)
- Nathan Buckley (2003 tied)
- Dane Swan (2011)
- Nick Daicos (2026)

=== Leigh Matthews Trophy Winners ===
- Darren Millane (1990)
- Dane Swan (2010)
- Nick Daicos (2025, 2026)

=== AFLCA Champion Player of the Year Award Winners ===
- Nathan Buckley (2003) (First ever winner)
- Dane Swan (2010)
- Scott Pendlebury (2013)
- Nick Daicos (2024, 2026)

=== Coleman Medalists ===
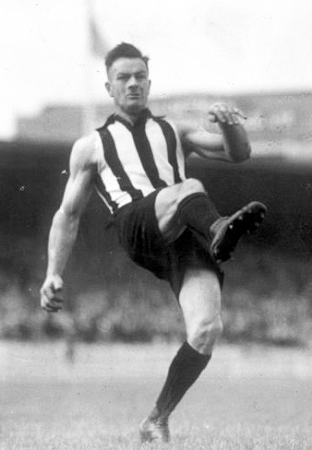
Gordon Coventry led the VFL in goalkicking six times.

Instituted in 1981, retrospective awards were dated back to 1955; prior to that, the League awarded the Leading Goalkicker Medal

- Ian Brewer (1958)
- Peter McKenna (1972, 1973)
- Brian Taylor (1986)

Leading Goalkicker Medal winners

- Archie Smith 1898
- Teddy Lockwood 1900 (tied), 1903
- Charlie Pannam 1905
- Dick Lee 1907, 1908, 1909, 1914, 1916, 1917, 1919
- Gordon Coventry 1926, 1927, 1928, 1929, 1930, 1933
- Ron Todd 1938, 1939
- Des Fothergill 1946

=== Norm Smith Medal Winners ===
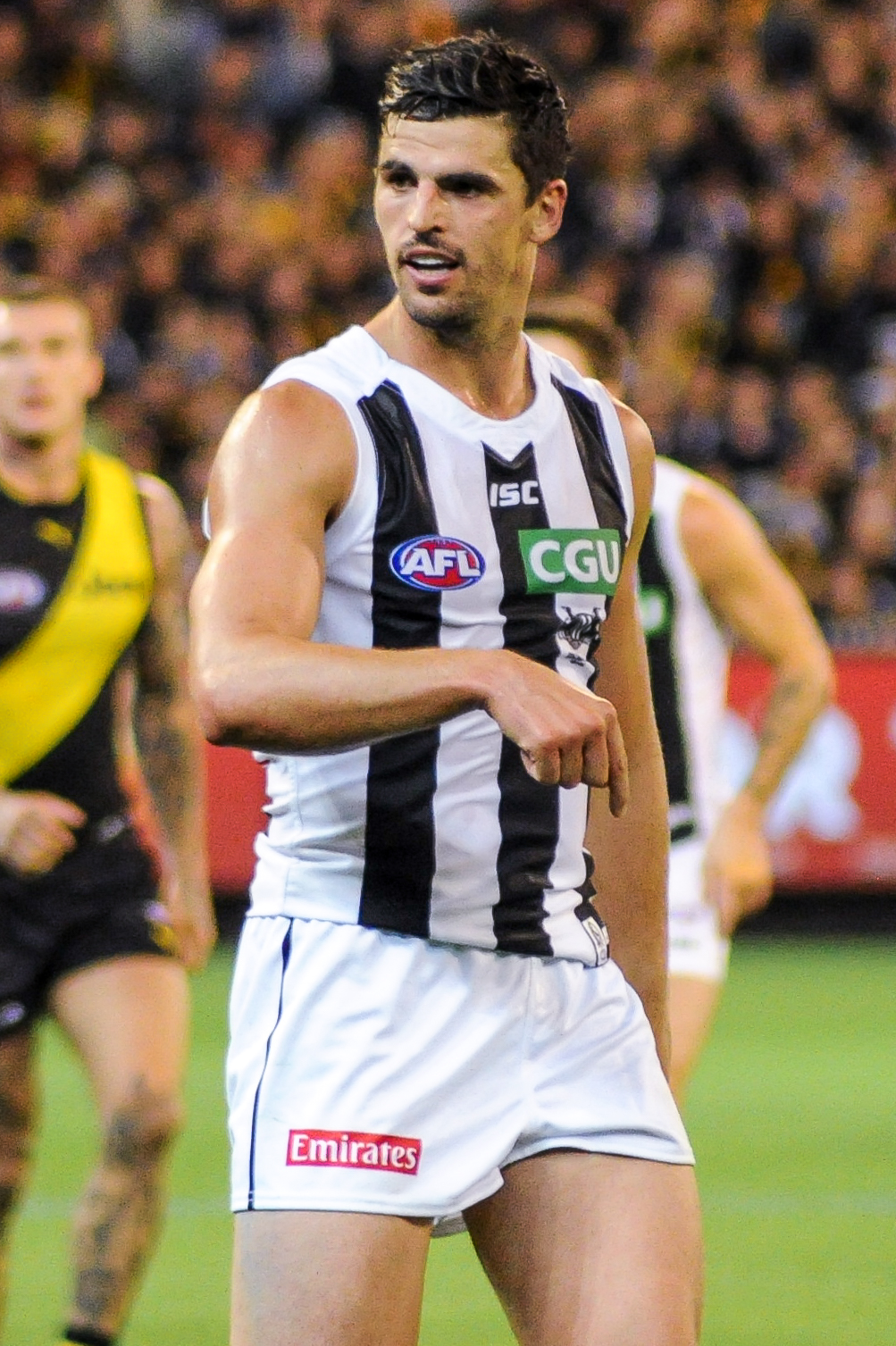
Scott Pendlebury, winner of the 2010 Norm Smith Medal

- Tony Shaw (1990)
- Nathan Buckley (2002)
- Scott Pendlebury (2010)
- Bobby Hill (2023)

=== E. J. Whitten Medalists ===
- Gavin Brown (1989, 1997)

=== Mark of the Year Winners ===
- Alan Atkinson (1973)
- Billy Picken (1974)
- Billy Picken (1976)
- Peter Daicos (1980)
- Denis Banks (1984)
- Chris Tarrant (2003)
- Andrew Krakouer (2011)
- Jamie Elliott (2013)
- Bobby Hill (2024)

=== Goal of the Year Winners ===
- Phil Manassa (1977)
- Peter Daicos (1991)
- Mick McGuane (1994)
- Leon Davis (2008)
- Josh Daicos (2020)

=== Anzac Day Medalists ===
- Saverio Rocca (1995, 1998) ^
- Scott Russell (1996) ^
- Damien Monkhorst (1997) ^
- Chris Tarrant (2001)
- Mark McGough (2002)
- Ben Johnson (2006)
- Heath Shaw (2007)
- Paul Medhurst (2008)
- Scott Pendlebury (2010, 2011, 2019, 2026)
- Dane Swan (2012, 2014)
- Paul Seedsman (2015)
- Steele Sidebottom (2016, 2025)
- Adam Treloar (2018)
- Jack Ginnivan (2022)
- Nick Daicos (2023)

^ Awarded retrospectively in 2011

=== Neale Daniher Trophy Winners ===
- Anthony Rocca (2001)
- Chris Tarrant (2002)
- Paul Licuria (2003)
- Josh Fraser (2004)
- Tarkyn Lockyer (2008)
- Scott Pendlebury (2009, 2021)
- Sharrod Wellingham (2011)
- Dane Swan (2012, 2013)
- Travis Cloke (2015)
- Mason Cox (2018)
- Adam Treloar (2019)
- Jack Crisp (2024)
- Josh Daicos (2025)

=== Bob Rose–Charlie Sutton Medalists ===
- Ben Johnson (2008)
- Dane Swan (2009)
- Scott Pendlebury (2010, 2012, 2017)
- Heath Shaw (2011, 2013)
- Tom Phillips (2018)
- Nick Daicos (2023)

=== Richard Pratt Medalists ===
- Dane Swan (2013)
- Tom Langdon (2014)
- Scott Pendlebury (2015)
- Steele Sidebottom (2018)
- Nick Daicos (2024, 2026)
- Lachie Schultz (2025)

=== Jason McCartney Medalists ===
- Anthony Rocca (2003)
- Ben Johnson (2004)
- Chris Tarrant (2006)
- James Clement (2007)
- Tarkyn Lockyer (2009)
- Scott Pendlebury (2013)

Not awarded since 2013

=== All Australian Team Selections ===
- Des Healey (1953)
- Bob Rose (1953)
- Terry Waters (1969)
- Ricky Watt (1969)
- Peter McKenna (1972)
- Len Thompson (1972)
- Peter Moore (1979)
- Michael Richardson (1983)
- Geoff Raines (1985)
- Tony Francis (1991)
- Gavin Brown (1991, 1994)
- Mick McGuane (1992)
- Nathan Buckley (1996, 1997, 1998, 1999, 2001, 2003)
- Chris Tarrant (2003)
- James Clement (2004, 2005)
- Alan Didak (2006, 2010)
- Paul Medhurst (2008)
- Dane Swan (2009, 2010, 2011, 2012, 2013)
- Nick Maxwell (2009)
- Leon Davis (2009, 2011)
- Scott Pendlebury (2010, 2011, 2012, 2013, 2014, 2019)
- Harry O'Brien (2010)
- Dale Thomas (2011)
- Ben Reid (2011)
- Travis Cloke (2011, 2013)
- Dayne Beams (2012)
- Brodie Grundy (2018, 2019)
- Steele Sidebottom (2018)
- Adam Treloar (2019)
- Darcy Moore (2020, 2023)
- Taylor Adams (2020)
- Brayden Maynard (2022)
- Josh Daicos (2023)
- Nick Daicos (2023, 2024, 2025, 2026)

=== International Rules Representatives ===
- Gavin Brown (1990)
- Nathan Buckley (1998), (1999 – captain)
- James Clement (2002)
- Alan Didak (2004)
- Scott Pendlebury (2008), (2017)
- Dale Thomas (2008)
- Dane Swan (2010)
- Tyson Goldsack (2010)

=== Michael Tuck Medalists ===
- Heath Shaw (2011)

=== Jim Stynes Medalists ===
- Dane Swan (2010)

=== State of Origin Selections ===
- Work in progress, please update as I am struggling to find more*

Victoria

- Peter Daicos (1984, 1990)
- Tony Shaw (1984, 1990, 1991, 1992)
- Darren Millane (1986)
- Brian Taylor (1986)
- Gavin Brown (1989, 1990, 1991, 1992, 1993, 1994, 1997)
- Gavin Crosisca (1990)
- Mick McGuane (1990, 1992, 1993)
- Graham Wright (1990)
- Josh Fraser (2008)
- Scott Pendlebury (2008, 2020)
- Heath Shaw (2008)
- Darcy Moore (2020)
- Steele Sidebottom (2020)
- Nick Daicos (2026)

South Australia

- Lachie Neale (2027)

Queensland

- Gavin Crosisca (1988, 1991)

Tasmania

- Graham Wright (1990)

Western Australia

- Darcy Cameron (2026)

Allies

- Gavin Crosisca (1995, 1996)
- Graham Wright (1996)
- Leon Davis (2008)
- Brodie Grundy (2020)
- Jeremy Howe (2020)

== Match records ==
- Highest score: R17, 1980 – Collingwood 32.19 (211) v St Kilda 16.11 (107) – Waverley Park
- Lowest score: R6, 1897 (VP) – Collingwood 0.8 (8) v South Melbourne 2.15 (27) – Victoria Park (VP)
- Lowest score since 1919: Grand Final, 1960 – 2.2 (14) v Melbourne 8.14 (62) – Melbourne Cricket Ground (MCG)
- Highest losing score: R16, 1937 – Collingwood 21.16 (142) v Melbourne 22.21 (153) – VP
- Lowest winning score: R9, 1899 (VP) – Collingwood 3.3 (21) v Melbourne 1.7 (13) – VP
- Lowest winning score since 1919: Grand Final, 1927 – 2.13 (25) v Richmond 1.7 (13) – MCG
- Biggest winning margin: 178 points; R4, 1979 – Collingwood 31.21 (207) v St Kilda 3.11 (29) – VP
- Biggest losing margin: 138 points; R3, 1942 – Collingwood 5.7 (37) v Richmond 25.25 (175) – Punt Road Oval
- Record attendance (home and away game): R10, 1958 – 99,346 v Melbourne – MCG
- Record attendance (finals match): Grand Final, 1970 – 121,696 v Carlton – MCG

=== Records set by players ===
- Most matches: Scott Pendlebury – 442 (2006–2026)
- Most consecutive matches: Jack Crisp – 286* (2012–)
- Most goals kicked in a match: Gordon Coventry – 17 goals 4 behinds (R12, 1930, VP) – VFL record until 1947
- Most Best & Fairests: Nathan Buckley – 6 (1994, 1996, 1998, 1999, 2000, 2003)
- Most matches as coach: Jock McHale – 714 (1912–1949) – VFL/AFL record until 2015 (Remains a record for the most matches as coach at one club.)
- Most matches as captain/acting captain: Scott Pendlebury – 206 (2014–2022)
- Most goals in a season: Peter McKenna – 143 (1970)
- Most career goals: Gordon Coventry – 1299 (1920–1937) – VFL/AFL record until 1999 (Remains a record for the most career goals at one club.)

== Cultural influence ==
- David Williamson's 1977 stage play, The Club, was inspired by the backroom dealings and antics of the Collingwood Football Club; although Collingwood is never mentioned by name. The 1980 film version of the play – directed by Bruce Beresford and starring John Howard, Jack Thompson, Graham Kennedy and Frank Wilson – is set at Collingwood and featured Collingwood players in speaking and non-speaking roles. The film was almost entirely shot on location at Victoria Park, both inside and on the actual oval.
- Judd Apatow's 2009 film, Funny People, starring Adam Sandler and Seth Rogen, featured a scene with Australian actor Eric Bana trying to explain the rules of Australian rules football. During this scene Bana's character, a St Kilda supporter, voices his dislike for Collingwood while watching a televised game.
- Adam Elliot's 2009 clay-animated film, Mary and Max, features a scene with a school-yard bully, named Bernie Clifford, who wears a 1970s VFL-style Collingwood guernsey. A Collingwood garden gnome can also be seen in the film.
- In the 2010 independent Australian film Joffa: The Movie, Joffa Corfe and Shane McRae star as a couple of knockabout handymen with a passion for the Collingwood Football Club.
- John Brack's 1953 painting Three of the Players depicts three Collingwood players. The players are thought by some to be Lou Richards, Jack Regan and Phonse Kyne.
- The Melbourne-based architectural firm Edmond and Corrigan included Collingwood's black and white stripes in the designs of many of their buildings, including the VCA Theatre and Niagara Galleries.

== Activism ==
=== Same Sex Marriage ===
During the Australian Marriage Law Postal Survey, Collingwood supported the Yes vote.

=== Voice to Parliament ===
Collingwood was a supporter of the Voice to Parliament.

== See also ==
- History of the Collingwood Football Club
- List of Collingwood players
- List of Collingwood Football Club coaches
- Sport in Australia
- Sport in Victoria

== Footnotes ==
Notes

Bibliography

- Lovett, Michael (2010). AFL Record Season Guide. Geoff Slattery Media Group. ISBN 978-0-9806274-5-9.
- Victorian Government Hansard of November 1990, pp.2208–2218: Victorian Legislative Assembly's debate on the Collingwood (Victoria Park) Land Bill on 21 November 1990: features an informative interchange between Murray Weideman's older brother, Graeme Weideman, and former South Melbourne footballer, Bill McGrath, both of whom were MLAs at the time.
