= Ranald Macdonald (journalist) =

Ranald Macdonald AO
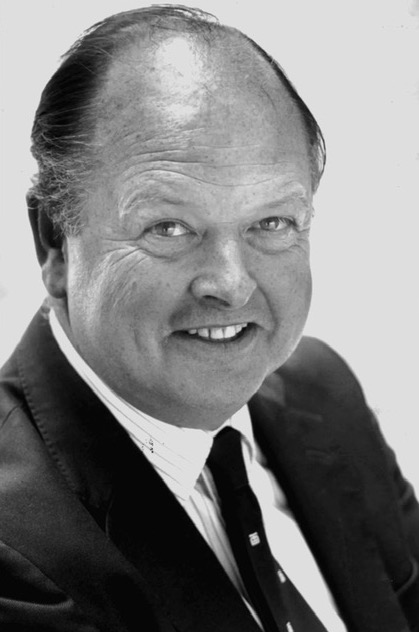
- Born: 27 June 1938 (age 87); Melbourne, Victoria, Australia
- Occupations: Journalist and newspaper executive; broadcaster; educator
- Spouse: Patricia Tryon
- Children: Laura, Hamish

Chesborough Ranald Macdonald AO (born 27 June 1938) known personally and professionally as Ranald Macdonald, is a retired Australian journalist, media executive, broadcaster and educator. Macdonald served as Managing Director of David Syme & Co. Limited (publisher of The Age newspaper in Melbourne, Australia) from 1964 to 1983 and as editor-in-chief from 1966 to 1970. From 1995 until 1999 he served as the Chairman of the Boston University College of Communication Department of Journalism.

== Early life ==
Macdonald was born in Melbourne, Australia, to Hamish Claude Henry Macdonald and Nancy Alison Syme, on 27 June 1938. He spent his early years in Wantabadgery West, near Wagga Wagga in New South Wales, where the family neighbours included Sir Keith Murdoch and his family, cousins of his mother Nancy.

His father Hamish, a captain in the Second Australian Imperial Force, 2/19th Battalion, was killed in the Fall of Singapore on 19 January 1942, leaving three children — Ranald and two sisters, Jean and Morna. It was two years before the family had confirmation of his death.

His mother Nancy later re-married Colonel E.H.B. (Ted) Neill, known as "The Colonel" and they had one child, James. The Colonel had shared rooms at Jesus College, Cambridge University with Hamish Macdonald.

== Education ==
Macdonald was educated at Geelong Grammar School, where he was a boarder from the age of 6 and attended the inaugural year of Geelong Grammar's rural Victorian campus Timbertop, when it opened in 1953. The innovative educational program at Timbertop gained fame when Charles III attended in 1966. Macdonald greatly admired his Headmaster, Sir James Darling, who initiated Timbertop and gave the eulogy at his grandfather Oswald Syme's funeral.

Like his father, Macdonald attended Jesus College, Cambridge, where he studied law and history from 1957 to 1960. On completing his degree, Macdonald returned to Australia and worked as a cadet reporter at The Age for three years, until a fortuitous golf game with a US naval captain at Royal Melbourne Golf Club, led to an introduction to Ed Barrett, Dean of the Columbia University Graduate School of Journalism. Macdonald had scribbled his details on the back of their scorecard, which resulted in him attending Columbia on scholarship to study a combined business and journalism Master of Science degree (1963–64), the first of its kind in the United States.

For his thesis, Macdonald imagined 'The Great American Newspaper'. He cherry-picked the top editorial initiatives and other aspects of the best newspapers in America and combined them to create his 'ideal' publication, selecting opinion pieces from the Washington Post, political coverage from The Courier-Journal in Louisville, editorials from the New York Times, classified ads from the Miami Herald and advertising from the Denver Post, among others.

He sent a copy of his thesis to each newspaper he had featured, and was invited to visit almost all of them. He undertook a road trip to learn about the best in American journalism before returning to Australia. Macdonald was offered a few jobs along the way, one by Katharine Graham at the Washington Post, who became a good friend.

== Career ==
=== The Age ===
In 1964, a twist of fate saw Macdonald appointed to the position of managing director of The Age when his grandfather and chairman of Age publisher David Syme & Co. Limited, Oswald Syme, misheard his grandson and thought he was threatening to leave the paper unless he was given the position. He was actually suggesting the role of marketing manager. He served as managing director until 1983.

Also in 1964, the board of David Syme & Co. appointed Macdonald's stepfather, Colonel Neill, as Chairman when Oswald retired.

In his early years at The Age, Macdonald rebuffed takeover bids by, among others, Frank Packer, his own cousin Rupert Murdoch, and The Times owner Roy Thomson. To maintain the newspaper's independence, Macdonald created the Syme-Fairfax Partnership with John Fairfax & Sons, which allowed the Syme Trust to continue after Oswald's death in 1967. The partnership ran from 1966 until 1983, when Fairfax bought out the remaining shares in David Syme and Co. and Macdonald stepped down as managing director.

In 1966, after two years of battles, Macdonald replaced deeply entrenched editor Keith Sinclair and appointed Graham Perkin, while Macdonald assumed the role of editor-in-chief, serving until 1970. Macdonald and Perkin guided the paper through a transformation from its staid, conservative roots to what news magazine The Bulletin called "Australia's Most Important Newspaper".

Macdonald and Perkin set out to make The Age the best, most influential and trusted journal, through quality journalism, encouragement and leadership. Their partnership was described by John Jost in Playboy as, "a perfect union of editorial and newspaper management skills". They believed in challenging decisionmakers and informing the public so that readers of The Age could make up their own minds about issues.

Macdonald's tenure saw sweeping changes at The Age, including the addition of bylines to stories and the introduction of columnists, such as highly respected Phillip Adams. An independent ombudsman was hired and a corrections column was launched, entitled "We Were Wrong". Columnists like Nancy Dexter broke ground for women journalists with her column "Nancy Dexter Takes Note" discussing issues of the day, including the fight for equal pay, domestic violence and abortion law reform. Macdonald and Perkin introduced talented cartoonists to readers of The Age, including Les Tanner, Ron Tandberg, Bruce Petty, Michael Leunig, John Spooner and Peter Nicholson.

In 1981, Macdonald prodded the Victorian Government to establish the Norris Inquiry into press ownership in Victoria, as he believed that a significant investment by John Fairfax & Sons in the Herald and Weekly Times group, the Melbourne-based rival of The Age, created a conflict of interest.

Macdonald stepped down as managing director in 1983. That same year, the Syme–Fairfax partnership ended as the Syme family found it impossible to continue its financial support of the partnership.

=== Academia ===
Having lectured on journalism at Curtin and Murdoch Universities, Macdonald accepted a position in 1987 as associate professor at the Royal Melbourne University of Technology (later known as RMIT), serving until 1995, when he accepted a faculty position at Boston University. Chilean professor Claudio Veliz, under Chancellor John Silber, headhunted Macdonald for the University Professors program, which already included Nobel Prize laureates Elie Wiesel and Saul Bellow. He became chair of the Department of Journalism within a year.

Macdonald established special summer programs to help orient foreign students in Boston, including American Journalism and American Society, in order to expose the students to different accents and new ideas. Macdonald also created The Boston University Great Debate series, inspired by Oxford–Cambridge debating. These debates were broadcast live on WBUR public radio, and became so popular that the final one during Macdonald's tenure was broadcast on C-SPAN, an arrangement that continued after Macdonald's departure.

In 1999, Macdonald accepted the position of Boston University's international programme in London, where he helped to establish new overseas study programs in Auckland and Sydney. He co-founded the European Study Abroad Program (EUSA), a company which organises internships for thousands of American students a year in Dublin, Grenoble, Madrid, Paris, Sydney, London, Los Angeles and Boston.

=== Other work ===
Macdonald served as President of Collingwood Football Club from 1982 to 1986. He appointed Leigh Matthews, who later coached Collingwood to the Premiership in 1990, ending a 32-year title drought.

Before leaving The Age, Macdonald was appointed by Victorian Premier John Cain Jr. to chair Victoria's 150th Anniversary Board from 1982–85, which organised the yearlong activities. He also represented Victoria on the Australian Bicentennial Authority (ABA) from 1983–85, but resigned, with the support of Prime Minister Bob Hawke, over his concerns about financial irregularities at the ABA.

In 1983, he turned down an invitation from then Chairman of the ABC, Ken Myer, to become the first Managing Director of the Australian Broadcasting Corporation (ABC).

In 1990, he began hosting ABC Radio 774/3LO's leading current affairs show between 8:30 until 10am every weekday. He successfully increased ratings until his departure in 1995.

== Honours and awards ==
- Elected to the Media Hall of Fame at the Melbourne Press Club, 2014
- Officer of the Order of Australia AO, 1986

=== Associations ===
- Chairman, International Press Institute (IPI), Australian section (1971–84)
- Founder, Australian Press Council
- President, Australian Newspapers Council (1974–77)
- Chairman, Media Council of Australia (1975–77)
- Vice Chairman IPI, Asian and Pacific Region (1978–80)
- World Chairman IPI (1978–80; first Australian to hold the position)
- Vice Chairman, Press Foundation of Asia (1981–84)

== Personal life ==
Macdonald is the great-grandson of powerful newspaper proprietor David Syme, who with his brother Ebenezer, bought The Age in 1854. They turned it into a powerful force for political and social change in Victoria.

On 11 August 1973, Macdonald married Patricia Tryon in Great Durnford, Wiltshire, England. They have two children, Laura (born 30 December 1974) and Hamish (born 27 April 1977). Patricia has worked in many areas of the arts, including exhibition curation. She re-opened and ran the Melbourne office of Christie's auction house, became head of the pictures department and later a director of the company.

In 1985, unsuccessful investments in a string of health clubs combined with an over-commitment to unpaid positions, led to financial troubles for Macdonald.

Macdonald is passionate about golf and has won numerous championships at Royal Melbourne and Barwon Heads. He is a life member of The Royal and Ancient Golf Club of St Andrews, Scotland. The late champion Peter Thomson was one of his closest friends.

Macdonald continues to campaign for press freedom and for the independence of the Australian Broadcasting Corporation. He is active in community environmental projects on the Mornington Peninsula, where he has retired with his wife Patricia.

== Bibliography ==
- Hills, Ben (2010). Breaking News – The Golden Age of Graham Perkin. Scribe Publications. p. 220. ISBN 978-1921640377.
