= 1951 VFL Lightning Premiership =

- Season: 1951
- Teams: 12
- Winners: Collingwood (2nd title)
- Matches played: 11

The 1951 VFL Lightning Premiership was an Australian rules football knockout competition played entirely on Wednesday, 9 May. It was played on the Jubilee Day holiday, held to celebrate 50 years of Federation of Australia, between rounds 3 and 4 of the Victorian Football League's 1951 season with all games played at the MCG. This was the fourth time a lightning premiership had been contested in the VFL, the first since 1943. It was contested by the 12 VFL teams who competed in the 1951 VFL season. A total of 25,882 people attended the competition. Collingwood won its second Lighting Premiership competition defeating Melbourne in the final by 6 points.

== Matches ==
=== First round ===
Home team	Home team score	Away team	Away team score	Ground	Date
Carlton	2.2 (14)	Footscray	3.2 (20)	MCG	Wednesday, 9 May
Hawthorn	0.1 (1)	Melbourne	0.4 (4)	MCG	Wednesday, 9 May
Essendon	1.5 (11)	Fitzroy	0.2 (2)	MCG	Wednesday, 9 May
Geelong	3.3 (21)	St Kilda	2.2 (14)	MCG	Wednesday, 9 May
Bye: Richmond, Collingwood, North Melbourne, South Melbourne

=== Second round ===
Home team	Home team score	Away team	Away team score	Ground	Date
Richmond	4.2 (26)	South Melbourne	2.3 (15)	MCG	Wednesday, 9 May
Collingwood	2.1 (13)	North Melbourne	0.3 (3)	MCG	Wednesday, 9 May
Footscray	0.0 (0)	Melbourne	1.2 (8)	MCG	Wednesday, 9 May
Essendon	4.3 (27)	Geelong	2.1 (13)	MCG	Wednesday, 9 May

=== Semi-finals ===
Home team	Home team score	Away team	Away team score	Ground	Date
Richmond	2.2 (14)	Melbourne	3.2 (20)	MCG	Wednesday, 9 May
Collingwood	2.2 (14)	Essendon	2.1 (13)	MCG	Wednesday, 9 May

== Grand final ==
Home team	Home team score	Away team	Away team score	Ground	Date
Melbourne	1.0 (6)	Collingwood	2.0 (12)	MCG	Wednesday, 9 May

== See also ==
- List of Australian Football League night premiers
- Australian Football League pre-season competition
- 1951 VFL season
