= Sons of the Sea (song) =

Song by Arthur Reece
- Published: 1897
- Genre: Music hall
- Songwriter: Felix McGlennon

"Sons of the Sea" is a British music hall song written by Felix McGlennon. Praising the might of the British navy and its men, it was first performed in 1897 by singer Arthur Reece, and revived after the sinking of the cruiser HMS Gladiator in 1908. It remained popular through the First World War, and Reece continued to perform it on stage until the 1950s.

== Parodies ==
A parody known as "Bobbing Up and Down Like This" — with those words interposed with the original lyrics — became popular at Boy Scout camps and elsewhere. It is also the chosen song/anthem for the Highridge Utd Football Club in Bristol, and has been known to be sung at Gloucestershire cricket games by supporters. The words are:

Sons of the seas, when we’re bobbin' up and down like this.
Over the ocean, when we’re bobbin' up and down like this.
You can build a ship, my friend, when we’re bobbin' up and down like this.

But you can't beat the boys of the Gloucestershire, when we’re bobbin' up and down like this.

It is used as the club theme song by the Western Bulldogs in the Australian Rules Football league under the title "Sons of the S'cray", as Western Bulldogs' old name was Footscray, a suburb in Western Melbourne. When they renamed their team to "Western Bulldogs", they changed it to "Sons of the West", and changed some of the words to fit in with the new song and club name. There is a very strong similarity to a 1914 Navy song called "Sons of the Sea" sung by Robert Howe.

== Songs of the same title ==
There is also an art-song called "Sons of the Sea", lyrics by Sarojini Naidu, music by Samuel Coleridge-Taylor (1910) of which there is a famous recording by Peter Dawson. There is no literary or musical connection with the folk song discussed above.
