= Pat Cash Sr. =

Australian rules footballer

Personal information
- Full name: Patrick Cussen Cash
- Born: 5 September 1928
- Died: 28 January 2008 (aged 79); Mitcham, Victoria
- Original team: University Blacks
- Height: 180 cm (5 ft 11 in)
- Weight: 80 kg (176 lb)
- Position: Forward

Playing career^{1}
Years	Club	Games (Goals)
1951–55	Hawthorn	58 (75)
- ^{1} Playing statistics correct to the end of 1955.

Patrick Cussen Cash (5 September 1928 – 28 January 2008) was an Australian rules footballer from Victoria, who played with Hawthorn in the Victorian Football League (VFL).

Cash, a University Blacks recruit, was one of the main forward targets of a weak Hawthorn side in the 1950s. He kicked 26 goals in his debut season, which was enough to top Hawthorn's goal-kicking and included a five-goal haul in a win over Melbourne.

His son, of the same name, is a retired tennis player who won Wimbledon in 1987.
