= Tom Nelson (Australian footballer) =

Australian rules footballer

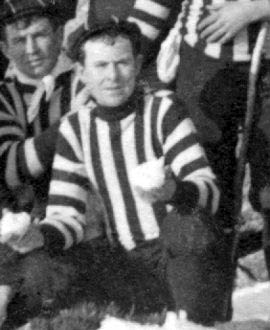
- Nelson in 1906

Personal information
- Full name: Thomas Nelson
- Born: 3 February 1883; Footscray, Victoria
- Died: 3 July 1957 (aged 74); Coburg, Victoria
- Original team: Yarraville
- Height: 177 cm (5 ft 10 in)
- Weight: 80 kg (176 lb)

Playing career^{1}
Years	Club	Games (Goals)
1906	Collingwood	3 (0)
- ^{1} Playing statistics correct to the end of 1906.

Tom Nelson (3 February 1883 – 3 July 1957) was an Australian rules footballer who played with Collingwood in the Victorian Football League (VFL). Nelson wrote the lyrics to the club song, "Good Old Collingwood Forever" to tune of "Goodbye, Dolly Gray".

== Early life ==
Tom Nelson was born on 3 February 1883 in Footscray, Victoria in southern Australia.
