= 1941 VFL Lightning Premiership =

- Season: 1941
- Teams: 12
- Winners: Collingwood (1st title)
- Matches played: 11

The 1941 VFL Lightning Premiership was an Australian rules football knockout competition played entirely on 24 May. It was played during a week's break of the Victorian Football Leagues's 1941 VFL season between rounds 4 and 5 with all games being played at the MCG. The competition was also played on the same day as an interstate match between New South Wales and Victoria in Sydney. This was the second time a lightning premiership had been contested in the VFL. It was contested by the 12 VFL teams who competed in the 1941 VFL season. A crowd of 19,572 attended the competition. Collingwood won the competition by 1 point, defeating Melbourne in the final.

== Matches ==
=== Round 1 ===
	Round 1
Saturday, 24 May	Fitzroy 4.0 (24)	def.	Hawthorn 3.1 (19)	Melbourne Cricket Ground
Saturday, 24 May	North Melbourne 1.2 (8)	def. by	St Kilda 3.5 (23)	Melbourne Cricket Ground
Saturday, 24 May	Essendon 3.4 (22)	def.	South Melbourne 1.3 (9)	Melbourne Cricket Ground
Saturday, 24 May	Carlton 2.1 (13)	def. by	Melbourne 2.6 (18)	Melbourne Cricket Ground
Saturday, 24 May	Collingwood 4.1 (25)	def.	Richmond 1.1 (7)	Melbourne Cricket Ground
Saturday, 24 May	Footscray 2.2 (14)	def. by	Geelong 2.4 (16)	Melbourne Cricket Ground

=== Quarter finals ===
Home team	Home team score	Away team	Away team score	Ground	Date
Essendon	3.2 (20)	Melbourne	4.3 (27)	MCG	Saturday, 24 May
Collingwood	2.7 (19)	Geelong	0.0 (0)	MCG	Saturday, 24 May
Bye: Fitzroy, St Kilda

=== Semi finals ===
Home team	Home team score	Away team	Away team score	Ground	Date
Fitzroy	2.2 (14)	Melbourne	2.5 (17)	MCG	Saturday, 24 May
St Kilda	2.0 (12)	Collingwood	3.2 (20)	MCG	Saturday, 24 May

== Grand final ==
Home team	Home team score	Away team	Away team score	Ground	Date
Melbourne	3.1 (19)	Collingwood	3.2 (20)	MCG	Saturday, 24 May

== See also ==
- List of Australian Football League night premiers
- Australian Football League pre-season competition
- 1941 VFL season
