= Paperlinx =

Australian paper company

Spicers
- Headquarters: Melbourne, Australia
- Parent: Kokusai Pulp & Paper

PaperlinX (ASX: PPX) is an international merchant of fine paper, industrial packaging products and equipment, sign and display, hardware and consumables, and graphic supplies and systems. Customers include printers, designers, agencies, publishers, end-users and advertisers.

PaperlinX owns merchanting companies in 20 countries. In the United Kingdom and Europe, the businesses are branded ‘PaperlinX’. In Canada, Australian, New Zealand and Asia the businesses operate under the ‘Spicers’ brand. The company was formed in April 2000 after demerging from Amcor. PaperlinX employs approximately 4000 people in 20 countries and is listed on the Australian Securities Exchange, trading under the ASX code 'PPX'. The corporate office is located in Melbourne, Australia.

In June 2009, PaperlinX sold its manufacturing business, Australian Paper, to Nippon Paper Group Inc of Japan. PaperlinX closed its paper manufacturing division, Tas Paper, in Tasmania, in mid-2010. In 2012, PaperlinX sold merchanting businesses in the US and Italy, Eastern Europe and South Africa.

== See also ==
- List of paper mills
