= Larry Spokes =

Australian rules footballer

Personal information
- Full name: Larry Spokes
- Born: 30 August 1920
- Died: 12 September 2007 (aged 87)
- Original team: Colac
- Height: 180 cm (5 ft 11 in)
- Weight: 83 kg (183 lb)
- Position: Forward

Playing career^{1}
Years	Club	Games (Goals)
1946–50	South Melbourne	61 (51)
- ^{1} Playing statistics correct to the end of 1950.

Larry Spokes (30 August 1920 – 12 September 2007) was a former Australian rules footballer who played with South Melbourne in the Victorian Football League (VFL).
