= CGU Insurance =

Australian insurance company

CGU Insurance Limited
- Company type: Subsidiary
- Industry: Insurance
- Founded: 1998; 28 years ago (through a global merger; 1851 initial foundation date)
- Headquarters: Melbourne, Australia
- Area served: Australia and New Zealand
- Key people: Peter Harmer (CEO)
- Products: General, commercial, rural, vehicle, home and contents insurance, workers compensation, consumer credit insurance (CCI)
- Number of employees: Approximately 4,000 (2023)
- Parent: IAG
- Subsidiaries: Swann Insurance, Mutual Community General Insurance (51% shareholdership)
- Website: www.cgu.com.au

CGU Insurance Limited is an Australian intermediary-based insurance company and forms part of Insurance Australia Group (IAG).

== Formation ==
CGU Insurance was formed through the global merger of Commercial Union plc and NZI's parent company, General Accident plc. The global merger brought together two highly regarded insurers with almost 160 years of experience in Australia and New Zealand. The acronyms of those two insurers were melded together to form CGU which is subsequently no longer an acronym.

== Operation ==
CGU Insurance sells its insurance products through a network of over 1,000 intermediaries, and more than 100 business partners. As of November 2024, CGU Insurance employs approximately 1,442 individuals across Australia and New Zealand.

== See also ==
- Combined Insurance
