= Felix McGlennon =

British songwriter and publisher (1856–1943)

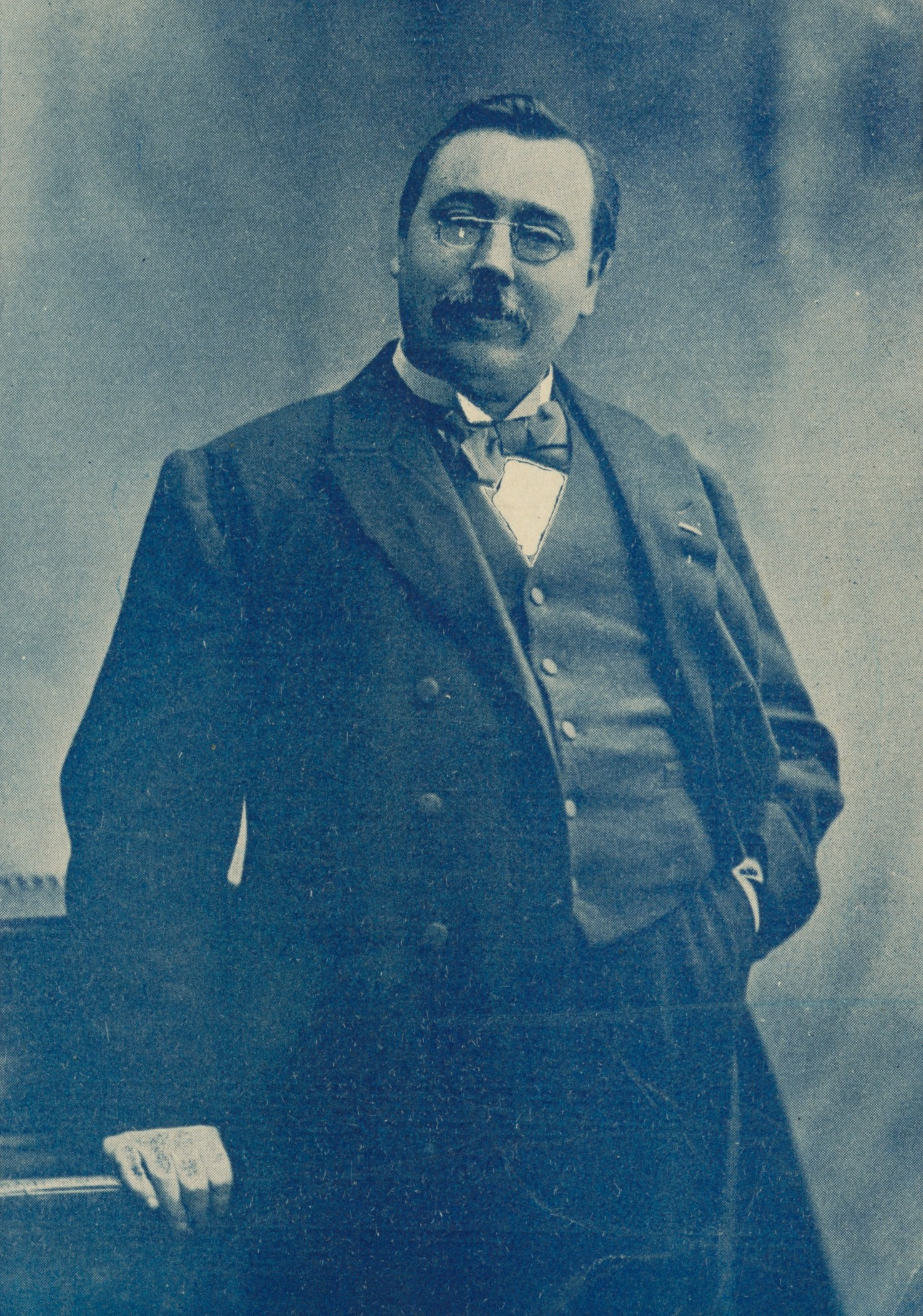
- McGlennon in 1897

Background information
- Born: 30 January 1856; Glasgow, Scotland
- Died: 1 December 1943 (aged 87) London, England
- Genres: Traditional pop, vaudeville, music hall
- Occupations: Songwriter, publisher
- Years active: c.1880–1930s

Felix McGlennon (30 January 1856 – 1 December 1943) was a British songwriter and publisher, whose seriocomic songs were popular in the music halls of the late nineteenth and early twentieth centuries.

== Biography ==
McGlennon was born in Glasgow, the son of an Irish shoemaker. He settled in Manchester, and by about 1880 was established there as a printer of penny song books. He emigrated to the United States in the mid-1880s, and began writing vaudeville songs, some of which, such as "His Funeral's Tomorrow", "Comrades" – a patriotic song about the friendship of two old soldiers written with George Horncastle, published in 1887 and popularised by Tom Costello – and "And Her Golden Hair was Hanging Down Her Back" (written with Monroe Rosenfeld, 1894, and popularised by Seymour Hicks), also became successful in British music halls. Although McGlennon wrote both words and music of some of his songs, he also worked with other lyricists, including Tom Browne, George Bruce, W. A. Archbold and Edgar Bateman.

McGlennon returned to live in Britain, and continued as a prolific songwriter. He wrote a wide variety of material, including settings of Irish nationalist verses such as "The Irish Rebel Emigrants"; and patriotic British nationalist songs such as "The British Bulldogs", "The Song That Will Live Forever", "Sons of the Sea", and "We Mean to Keep the Seas". According to the writer Dave Russell: "If McGlennon's texts were to be taken at face value, they illustrate perplexing ideological inconsistency, not least a sympathy with Irish republicanism mingled with a regard for the very imperialist ethos that shaped Ireland's destiny. In fact, his subject matter is merely testimony to his commercial wisdom." In 1909, McGlennon set up his own company in London, to publish collections of his songs, and other material including postcards.

He had no musical training, picked out his tunes on a toy piano, and had a poor opinion of their qualities, saying:

Assume, if you like, that what I write is rubbish. My reply is "It is exactly the sort of rubbish I am encouraged by the public to write"... All my life I have tried to produce an article for which there is a public demand. If I visit a music hall, it is with the single object of instructing myself as to the class of thing that is pleasing the public. Then, I try to write it – and write nothing else.

On another occasion, he said: "I would sacrifice everything – rhyme, reason, sense and sentiment – to catchiness. There is, let me tell you, a very great art in making rubbish acceptable."

He was married twice, and had four children; one of his sons, Felix Cornelius McGlennon, was killed in action in 1918 during the First World War. Felix McGlennon died in London in 1943 aged 87.
