= 2020 Collingwood Football Club season =

Collingwood Football Club
2020 season
- President: Eddie McGuire
- Coach: Nathan Buckley (9th season)
- Captains: Scott Pendlebury (7th season)
- Home ground: The MCG
- Regular season: 8th
- Finals series: Semi-finals
- Best and Fairest: Taylor Adams
- Leading goalkicker: Brody Mihocek (25 goals)

The 2020 Collingwood Football Club season was the club's 124th season of senior competition in the Australian Football League (AFL). The club also fielded its women's team in the AFL Women's competition though because of the COVID-19 pandemic it did not field reserves sides in the Victorian Football League and VFL Women's competitions.

== Squad ==
Players are listed by guernsey number, and 2020 statistics are for AFL regular season and finals series matches during the 2020 AFL season only. Career statistics include a player's complete AFL career, which, as a result, means that a player's debut and part or whole of their career statistics may be for another club. Statistics are correct as of the 1st Semi Final of the 2020 season (10 October 2020) and are taken from AFL Tables.

No.	Name	AFL debut	Games (2020)	Goals (2020)	Games (CFC)	Goals (CFC)	Games (AFL career)	Goals (AFL career)
1	Jaidyn Stephenson	2018	14	14	54	76	54	76
2	Jordan De Goey	2015	10	14	98	132	98	132
3	Isaac Quaynor	2019	11	0	15	0	15	0
4	Brodie Grundy	2013	19	3	151	46	151	46
5	Jamie Elliott	2012	18	10	123	174	123	174
6	Tyler Brown	2020	9	2	9	2	9	2
7	Adam Treloar	2012 (Greater Western Sydney)	10	1	94	49	173	97
8	Tom Langdon	2014	0	0	89	3	89	3
9	John Noble	2019	17	2	22	2	22	2
10	Scott Pendlebury (c)	2006	15	1	316	179	316	179
11	Dayne Beams	2009	0	0	119	123	177	172
12	Matthew Scharenberg	2015	3	0	41	0	41	0
13	Taylor Adams	2012 (Greater Western Sydney)	19	9	120	47	151	59
14	Darcy Cameron	2018 (Sydney)	10	4	10	4	11	4
15	Lynden Dunn	2006 (Melbourne)	2	1	33	2	198	99
16	Chris Mayne	2008 (Fremantle)	14	0	59	11	231	207
17	Callum Brown	2017	14	6	49	19	49	19
18	Travis Varcoe	2007 (Geelong)	9	1	92	41	230	171
19	Levi Greenwood	2009 (North Melbourne)	6	1	84	31	158	57
20	Ben Reid	2007	2	3	152	73	152	73
21	Tom Phillips	2016	15	5	89	44	89	44
22	Steele Sidebottom	2009	9	5	243	166	243	166
23	Jordan Roughead	2010 (Western Bulldogs)	17	0	41	1	179	35
24	Josh Thomas	2013	14	4	103	89	103	89
25	Jack Crisp	2012 (Brisbane Lions)	19	2	135	39	153	49
26	Josh Daicos	2017	18	10	35	17	35	17
27	Will Kelly	2020	1	1	1	1	1	1
28	Nathan Murphy	2018	0	0	2	0	2	0
29	Tim Broomhead	2014	1	0	37	27	37	27
30	Darcy Moore	2015	18	0	89	61	89	61
31	Flynn Appleby	2018	1	1	11	1	11	1
32	Will Hoskin-Elliott	2012 (Greater Western Sydney)	18	11	85	90	137	132
33	Rupert Wills	2016	8	0	23	1	23	1
34	Trent Bianco	****	0	0	0	0	0	0
35	Jay Rantall	****	0	0	0	0	0	0
36	Brayden Sier	2018	3	1	21	5	21	5
37	Brayden Maynard	2015	19	0	116	15	116	15
38	Jeremy Howe	2011 (Melbourne)	4	0	87	9	187	89
39	Trey Ruscoe	2020	4	5	4	5	4	5
40	Atu Bosenavulagi	2020	3	0	3	0	3	0
41	Brody Mihocek	2018	18	25	58	90	58	90
43	Anton Tohill	****	0	0	0	0	0	0
44	Jack Madgen	2018	13	0	21	0	21	0
45	Max Lynch	2020	1	0	1	0	1	0
46	Mason Cox	2016	11	14	69	85	69	85
47	Mark Keane	2020	1	0	1	0	1	0
48	Tom Wilson	****	0	0	0	0	0	0

=== Squad changes ===
==== In ====
No.	Name	Position	Previous club	via
48	(Victoria (state)) Tom Wilson		Sydney Kings	Category B rookie selection
14	(Western Australia) Darcy Cameron	Ruckman / Forward	Sydney	trade
35	(Victoria (state)) Jay Rantall	Midfielder	GWV Rebels	AFL National Draft, second round (pick No. 40)
34	(Victoria (state)) Trent Bianco	Midfielder / Defender	Oakleigh Chargers	AFL National Draft, third round (pick No. 45)
39	(Western Australia) Trey Ruscoe	Defender	East Fremantle	AFL National Draft, fourth round (pick No. 55)
15	(Victoria (state)) Lynden Dunn	Defender	Collingwood	Pre-season supplemental selection period

==== Out ====
No.	Name	Position	New Club	via
6	(Victoria (state)) Tyson Goldsack	Utility		retired
3	(Western Australia) Daniel Wells	Midfielder		retired
9	(Victoria (state)) Sam Murray	Defender		delisted
14	(South Australia) James Aish	Midfielder	Fremantle	trade
15	(Victoria (state)) Lynden Dunn	Defender		delisted
39	(Victoria (state)) Ben Crocker	Midfielder / Forward		delisted

== AFL season ==
=== Pre-season matches ===
Collingwood's 2020 practice matches
Date and local time	Opponent	Scores^{[a]}			Venue	Ref
Date and local time	Opponent	Home	Away	Result	Venue	Ref
Thursday, 20 February (16:00 pm)	Carlton	16.10 (106)	11.8 (74)	Lost by 32 points	Ikon Park [A]	

Collingwood's 2020 Marsh Community Series fixtures
Date and local time	Opponent	Scores^{[a]}			Venue	Attendance	Ref
Date and local time	Opponent	Home	Away	Result	Venue	Attendance	Ref
Sunday, 1 March (4:10 pm)	Richmond	6.8 (44)	13.6 (84)	Won by 40 points	Norm Minns Oval [A]		
Sunday, 8 March (3:50 pm)	St Kilda	9.3 (57)	10.8 (68)	Lost by 11 points	Morwell Recreation Reserve [H]		

=== Regular season ===
Due to the COVID-19 pandemic, the AFL started the first round playing in empty stadium and announced the league would be shortened to 17 rounds. Following the first round, the league was suspended due to the pandemic, and was resumed later in mid-June.

Collingwood's 2020 AFL season fixture
Round	Date and local time	Opponent	Home	Away	Result	Venue	Attendance	Ladder position	Ref
Round	Date and local time	Opponent	Scores^{[a]}			Venue	Attendance	Ladder position	Ref
1	Friday, 20 March (7:50 pm)	Western Bulldogs	5.4 (34)	13.8 (86)	Won by 52 points	Marvel Stadium [A]	0	2nd	
2	Thursday, 11 June (7:40 pm)	Richmond	5.6 (36)	5.6 (36)	Draw	MCG [H]	0	4th	
3	Saturday, 20 June (4:35 pm)	St Kilda	12.9 (81)	5.7 (37)	Won by 44 points	MCG [H]	0	2nd	
4	Friday, 26 June (7:50 pm)	Greater Western Sydney	10.6 (66)	9.10 (64)	Lost by 2 points	Giants Stadium [A]	487	5th	
5	Friday, 3 July (7:50 pm)	Essendon	7.6 (48)	10.3 (63)	Lost by 15 points	MCG [H]	0	10th	
6	Friday, 10 July (7:50 pm)	Hawthorn	8.11 (59)	3.9 (27)	Won by 32 points	Giants Stadium [H]	1,770	5th	
7	Thursday, 16 July (6:10 pm)	Geelong	5.5 (35)	8.9 (57)	Won by 22 points	Optus Stadium [A]	22,077	3rd	
8	Sunday, 26 July (1:35 pm)	West Coast	18.3 (111)	6.9 (45)	Lost by 66 points	Optus Stadium [A]	24,824	8th	
9	Sunday, 2 August (4:10 pm)	Fremantle	10.1 (61)	7.7 (49)	Lost by 12 points	Optus Stadium [A]	20,912	10th	
10	Thursday, 6 August (5:40 pm)	Sydney	6.14 (50)	6.5 (41)	Won by 9 points	The Gabba [H]	4,146	8th	
11	Tuesday, 11 August (6:40 pm)	Adelaide	5.8 (38)	10.2 (62)	Won by 24 points	Adelaide Oval [A]	8,577	7th	
12	Saturday, 15 August (5:10 pm)	Melbourne	16.4 (100)	6.8 (44)	Lost by 56 points	The Gabba [A]	5,338	7th	
13	Monday, 24 August (7:10 pm)	North Melbourne	10.5 (65)	5.5 (35)	Won by 30 points	The Gabba [H]	2,443	7th	
14	Sunday, 30 August (3:35 pm)	Carlton	7.6 (48)	10.12 (72)	Won by 24 points	The Gabba [A]	9,033	6th	
15	Friday, 4 September (7:50 pm)	Brisbane Lions	6.6 (42)	5.4 (34)	Lost by 8 points	The Gabba [A]	15,036	6th	
16	Bye							7th	
17	Monday, 14 September (7:10 pm)	Gold Coast	10.8 (68)	6.10 (46)	Won by 22 points	The Gabba [H]	2,896	6th	
18	Monday, 21 September (7:15 pm)	Port Adelaide	7.3 (45)	9.7 (61)	Lost by 16 points	The Gabba [H]	5,424	8th	

=== Finals series ===
Collingwood's 2020 AFL finals series fixtures
Round	Date and local time	Opponent	Home	Away	Result	Venue	Attendance	Ref
Round	Date and local time	Opponent	Scores^{[a]}			Venue	Attendance	Ref
1st Elimination final	Saturday, 3 October (6:10 pm)	West Coast	11.9 (75)	12.4 (76)	Won by 1 point	Optus Stadium [A]	32,865	
1st Semi-final	Saturday, 10 October (7:40 pm)	Geelong	15.10 (100)	5.2 (32)	Lost by 68 points	Gabba [A]	21,396	
Collingwood was eliminated from the 2020 AFL finals series

=== Ladder ===
Pos	Team	Pld	W	L	D	PF	PA	PP	Pts	Qualification
1	Port Adelaide	17	14	3	0	1185	869	136.4	56	Finals series
2	Brisbane Lions	17	14	3	0	1184	948	124.9	56	Finals series
3	Richmond (P)	17	12	4	1	1135	874	129.9	50	Finals series
4	Geelong	17	12	5	0	1233	901	136.8	48	Finals series
5	West Coast	17	12	5	0	1095	936	117.0	48	Finals series
6	St Kilda	17	10	7	0	1159	997	116.2	40	Finals series
7	Western Bulldogs	17	10	7	0	1103	1034	106.7	40	Finals series
8	Collingwood	17	9	7	1	965	881	109.5	38	Finals series
9	Melbourne	17	9	8	0	1063	986	107.8	36	
10	Greater Western Sydney	17	8	9	0	1007	1053	95.6	32	
11	Carlton	17	7	10	0	1017	1078	94.3	28	
12	Fremantle	17	7	10	0	866	924	93.7	28	
13	Essendon	17	6	10	1	938	1185	79.2	26	
14	Gold Coast	17	5	11	1	996	1099	90.6	22	
15	Hawthorn	17	5	12	0	1004	1194	84.1	20	
16	Sydney	17	5	12	0	890	1077	82.6	20	
17	North Melbourne	17	3	14	0	858	1205	71.2	12	
18	Adelaide	17	3	14	0	826	1283	64.4	12	

Updated to match(es) played on 21 September 2020. Source: AFL
Rules for classification: 1) points; 2) percentage; 3) number of points for.
(P) Premiers

=== Awards & Milestones ===
==== AFL Awards ====
- 2020 22under22 selection – Josh Daicos
- AFL Players Association Best Captain – Scott Pendlebury
- 2020 All-Australian team – Taylor Adams, Darcy Moore
- 2020 Goal of the Year – Josh Daicos

==== AFL Award Nominations ====
- Round 17 – 2020 AFL Rising Star nomination – Isaac Quaynor
- 2020 All-Australian team 40-man squad – Taylor Adams, Brayden Maynard, Darcy Moore, Scott Pendlebury

==== Club Awards ====
- E.W. Copeland Trophy – Taylor Adams
- R.T. Rush Trophy – Scott Pendlebury
- J.J. Joyce Trophy – Jack Crisp
- J.F. McHale Trophy – Darcy Moore
- Jack Regan Trophy – Brayden Maynard
- Joseph Wren Memorial Trophy – Nathan Murphy
- Darren Millane Memorial Trophy – Jeremy Howe
- Harry Collier Trophy – Isaac Quaynor
- Gordon Coventry Trophy – Brody Mihocek
- Gavin Brown Award – Taylor Adams
- Bob Rose Award – Brody Mihocek

==== Milestones ====
- Round 1 – Tyler Brown (AFL debut)
- Round 2 – Darcy Cameron (Collingwood debut)
- Round 3 – Brayden Maynard (100 games)
- Round 5 – Chris Mayne (50 Collingwood games)
- Round 6 – Will Kelly (AFL debut)
- Round 6 – Atu Bosenavulagi (AFL debut)
- Round 9 – Mark Keane (AFL debut)
- Round 10 – Trey Ruscoe (AFL debut)
- Round 10 – Brody Mihocek (50 games)
- Round 14 – Jaidyn Stephenson (50 games)
- Round 14 – Nathan Buckley (200 games coached)
- Round 15 – Max Lynch (AFL debut)
- Round 17 – Jack Crisp (150 AFL games)
- Round 17 – Josh Thomas (100 games)
- Elimination Final – Taylor Adams (150 AFL games)
- Elimination Final – Brodie Grundy (150 games)

== AFLW season ==
=== Pre-season matches ===
Collingwood's 2020 AFLW pre-season fixture
Date and local time	Opponent	Home	Away	Result	Venue	Ref
Date and local time	Opponent	Scores^{[a]}			Venue	Ref
Saturday, 25 January (10:00 am)	Melbourne	3.6 (24)	6.2 (38)	Lost by 14 points	Holden Centre [H]	

=== Regular season ===
Collingwood's 2020 AFL Women's season fixture
Round	Date and local time	Opponent	Home	Away	Result	Venue	Attendance	Ladder position	Ref
Round	Date and local time	Opponent	Scores^{[a]}			Venue	Attendance	Ladder position	Ref
1	Sunday, 9 February (1:10 pm)	West Coast	5.8 (38)	1.5 (11)	Won by 27 points	Victoria Park [H]	6,100	1st	
2	Sunday, 16 February (3:10 pm)	Carlton	3.6 (24)	6.3 (39)	Won by 15 points	Ikon Park [A]	7,529	2nd	
3	Saturday, 22 February (4:10 pm)	Fremantle	5.3 (33)	4.6 (30)	Lost by 3 points	Fremantle Oval [A]	5,636	2nd	
4	Friday, 28 February (7:10 pm)	Melbourne	4.2 (26)	7.4 (46)	Lost by 20 points	Marvel Stadium [H]	21,528	4th	
5	Sunday, 8 March (1:10 pm)	Western Bulldogs	8.5 (53)	3.3 (21)	Won by 32 points	Morwell Recreation Reserve [H]	1,992	4th	
6	Saturday, 14 March (2:10 pm)	Brisbane	2.2 (14)	5.13 (43)	Won by 29 points	Hickey Park [A]	0 (Note: Due to the COVID-19 pandemic, the AFLW round 6 was played in empty stadiums, while rounds 7 and 8 were cancelled, with the finals series being earlier and re-structured, also played in empty stadiums. A few days later, after playing the semi-final round of the finals series, the season was prematurely ended with no premiership awarded.)	4th	
7	Sunday, 22 March (6:10 pm)	St Kilda	Cancelled						
8	Saturday, 28 March (3:10 pm)	Geelong	Cancelled						

=== Finals series ===
Collingwood's 2020 AFLW finals series fixtures
Round	Date and local time	Opponent	Home	Away	Result	Venue	Attendance	Ref
Round	Date and local time	Opponent	Scores^{[a]}			Venue	Attendance	Ref
1st Semi final	Saturday, 21 March (12:40 pm)	North Melbourne	5.4 (34)	5.2 (32)	Lost by 2 points	Ikon Park [A]	0	
Collingwood was eliminated from the 2020 AFLW finals series, which regardless were cancelled.

=== Ladder ===
Conference B
Pos	Team	Pld	W	L	D	PF	PA	PP	Pts	Qualification
1	Fremantle	6	6	0	0	277	179	154.7	24	Finals series
2	Carlton	6	5	1	0	249	164	151.8	20	Finals series
3	Melbourne	6	4	2	0	204	124	164.5	16	Finals series
4	Collingwood	6	4	2	0	229	149	153.7	16	Finals series
5	St Kilda	6	2	4	0	154	170	90.6	8	
6	Western Bulldogs	6	1	5	0	179	246	72.8	4	
7	West Coast	6	1	5	0	85	265	32.1	4	

Updated to match(es) played on 7 March 2020. Source: womens.afl
Rules for classification: 1) points; 2) percentage; 3) number of points for.

=== Squad ===
Players are listed by guernsey number, and 2020 statistics are for AFL Women's regular season and finals series matches during the 2020 AFL Women's season only. Career statistics include a player's complete AFL Women's career, which, as a result, means that a player's debut and part or whole of their career statistics may be for another club. Statistics are correct as of the Semi final of the 2020 season (21 March 2020) and are taken from Australian Football.

No.	Name	AFLW debut	Games (2020)	Goals (2020)	Games (CFC)	Goals (CFC)	Games (AFLW career)	Goals (AFLW career)
1	Sharni Layton	2019	7	3	13	3	13	3
2	Chloe Molloy	2018	7	6	14	7	14	7
3	Brianna Davey	2017 (Carlton)	6	0	6	0	23	3
4	Sarah D'Arcy	2017	7	4	24	10	24	10
5	Emma Grant	2017	0	0	20	2	20	2
6	Jordyn Allen	2019	7	1	14	2	14	2
7	Sarah Rowe	2019	7	5	14	7	14	7
8	Brittany Bonnici	2017	7	0	28	1	28	1
9	Alana Porter	2020	7	0	7	0	7	0
10	Ashleigh Brazill	2018	4	0	12	0	12	0
11	Eliza Hynes	2018	3	0	11	0	11	0
12	Stacey Livingstone	2017	7	0	23	0	23	0
13	Jaimee Lambert	2017 (Western Bulldogs)	7	3	21	7	27	12
14	Aishling Sheridan	2020	7	2	7	2	7	2
15	Erica Fowler	2019	7	0	9	0	9	0
16	Katie Lynch	2019	1	0	7	1	7	1
17	Steph Chiocci (c)	2017	7	1	26	5	26	5
18	Ruby Schleicher	2017	2	0	18	0	18	0
20	Kaila Bentvelzen	****	0	0	0	0	0	0
21	Jordan Membrey	2017 (Brisbane)	7	7	10	9	15	10
22	Sophie Casey	2017	7	1	22	2	22	2
23	Lauren Butler	2019	7	0	10	0	10	0
24	Sophie Alexander	2019	5	3	9	4	9	4
25	Mikala Cann	2019	7	1	11	1	11	1
32	Georgia Gourlay	2019	0	0	5	0	5	0
33	Machaelia Roberts	****	0	0	0	0	0	0
35	Maddie Shevlin	2019	5	0	10	1	10	1
41	Kristy Stratton	2018	1	0	8	0	8	0
46	Sarah Dargan	2018	4	0	14	2	14	2
50	Ebony O'Dea	2020	4	0	4	0	4	0

==== Squad changes ====
In

No.	Name	Position	Previous club	via
3	(Victoria (state)) Brianna Davey	Defender / Midfielder	Carlton	trade
14	(Republic of Ireland) Aishling Sheridan	Forward	Cavan	rookie signing
20	(Victoria (state)) Kaila Bentvelzen	Forward	Casey Demons	AFLW National Draft, fourth round (pick No. 67)
21	(Victoria (state)) Jordan Membrey	Midfielder / Forward	Collingwood	AFLW National Draft, fifth round (pick No. 74)
9	(Victoria (state)) Alana Porter	Defender	Oakleigh Chargers	AFLW National Draft, fifth round (pick No. 82)
50	(South Australia) Ebony O'Dea	Defender / Midfielder	Greater Western Sydney	AFLW National Draft, sixth round (pick No. 89)
33	(Northern Territory) Machaelia Roberts	Forward	NT Thunder	AFLW National Draft, sixth round (pick No. 94)

Out

No.	Name	Position	New Club	via
21	(Victoria (state)) Iilish Ross	Defender	Richmond	delisted
34	(Victoria (state)) Darcy Guttridge	Forward	St Kilda	delisted
3	(Victoria (state)) Nicole Hildebrand	Defender		delisted
9	(Victoria (state)) Melissa Kuys	Ruck rover		delisted
19	(South Australia) Georgie Parker	Utility		delisted
28	(Victoria (state)) Holly Whitford	Midfielder / Forward		delisted
31	(Victoria (state)) Jordan Membrey	Midfielder / Forward		delisted

=== League awards ===
- 2020 22under22 selection – Chloe Molloy (captain)
- 2020 AFL Women's All-Australian team – Jaimee Lambert, Sharni Layton

=== Club Awards ===
- Best and fairest – Jaimee Lambert
- Best first year player – Alana Porter and Aishling Sheridan
- Best finals player – Brittany Bonnici
- Players' player award – Sharni Layton
- Leading goalkicker – Jordan Membrey (7 goals)

== VFL/VFLW seasons (cancelled) ==
Collingwood had been expected to field a reserves men's team in the Victorian Football League for a thirteenth consecutive season. The AFL however issued a direction to all 18 clubs mandating that no AFL-listed player at a club could participate in a second-tier state league amidst the COVID-19 pandemic and the season was cancelled indefinitely. Collingwood also did not field a team in the VFL Women's league, as the competition was reduced to a four-team Super Series.

== Notes ==
Key

- H Home match.
- A Away match.

Notes

- **^{a}** Collingwood's scores are indicated in **bold** font.

== See also ==
- 2020 Collingwood Magpies Netball season
