= 2019 Collingwood Football Club season =

Collingwood Football Club
2019 season
- President: Eddie McGuire
- Coach: Nathan Buckley (8th season)
- Captains: Scott Pendlebury (6th season)
- Home ground: The MCG
- Regular season: 4th
- Finals series: Preliminary final
- Best and Fairest: Brodie Grundy
- Leading goalkicker: Brody Mihocek (36 goals)
- Highest home attendance: 85,405 vs. Essendon (Round 23)
- Lowest home attendance: 33,577 vs. Gold Coast (Round 20)
- Average home attendance: 58,975
- Club membership: 85,226

The 2019 Collingwood Football Club season was the club's 123rd season of senior competition in the Australian Football League (AFL). The club also fielded its reserves team in the VFL and a women's team in the AFL Women's competition.

== Squad ==
Players are listed by guernsey number, and 2019 statistics are for AFL regular season and finals series matches during the 2019 AFL season only. Career statistics include a player's complete AFL career, which, as a result, means that a player's debut and part or whole of their career statistics may be for another club. Statistics are correct as of the 1st Preliminary Final of the 2019 season (21 September 2019) and are taken from AFL Tables.

No.	Name	AFL debut	Games (2019)	Goals (2019)	Games (CFC)	Goals (CFC)	Games (AFL career)	Goals (AFL career)
1	Jaidyn Stephenson	2018	14	24	40	62	40	62
2	Jordan De Goey	2015	17	34	88	118	88	118
3	Daniel Wells	2003 (North Melbourne)	1	3	15	16	258	166
4	Brodie Grundy	2013	24	7	132	43	132	43
5	Jamie Elliott	2012	16	26	105	164	105	164
6	Tyson Goldsack	2007	0	0	165	50	165	50
7	Adam Treloar	2012 (Greater Western Sydney)	24	10	84	48	163	96
8	Tom Langdon	2014	9	0	89	3	89	3
9	Sam Murray	2018	0	0	13	0	13	0
10	Scott Pendlebury (c)	2006	24	12	301	178	301	178
11	Dayne Beams	2009	9	5	119	123	177	172
12	Matthew Scharenberg	2015	7	0	38	0	38	0
13	Taylor Adams	2012 (Greater Western Sydney)	12	6	101	39	132	51
14	James Aish	2014 (Brisbane Lions)	14	0	50	15	82	23
15	Lynden Dunn	2006 (Melbourne)	0	0	31	1	196	98
16	Chris Mayne	2008 (Fremantle)	21	4	45	11	217	207
17	Callum Brown	2017	22	11	35	13	35	13
18	Travis Varcoe	2007 (Geelong)	16	9	83	40	221	170
19	Levi Greenwood	2009 (North Melbourne)	17	0	78	30	152	56
20	Ben Reid	2007	8	11	150	70	150	70
21	Tom Phillips	2016	24	12	74	39	74	39
22	Steele Sidebottom	2009	23	10	234	161	234	161
23	Jordan Roughead	2010 (Western Bulldogs)	24	1	24	1	162	35
24	Josh Thomas	2013	22	21	89	85	89	85
25	Jack Crisp	2012 (Brisbane Lions)	24	2	116	37	134	47
26	Josh Daicos	2017	5	1	17	7	17	7
27	Will Kelly	****	0	0	0	0	0	0
28	Nathan Murphy	2018	0	0	2	0	2	0
29	Tim Broomhead	2014	0	0	36	27	36	27
30	Darcy Moore	2015	17	0	71	61	71	61
31	Flynn Appleby	2018	1	0	10	0	10	0
32	Will Hoskin-Elliott	2012 (Greater Western Sydney)	19	19	67	79	119	121
33	Rupert Wills	2016	9	0	15	1	15	1
34	Tyler Brown	****	0	0	0	0	0	0
35	Isaac Quaynor	2019	4	0	4	0	4	0
36	Brayden Sier	2018	6	2	18	4	18	4
37	Brayden Maynard	2015	23	1	97	15	97	15
38	Jeremy Howe	2011 (Melbourne)	21	1	83	9	183	89
39	Ben Crocker	2016	3	3	26	21	26	21
40	Atu Bosenavulagi	****	0	0	0	0	0	0
41	Brody Mihocek	2018	24	36	40	65	40	65
43	Anton Tohill	****	0	0	0	0	0	0
44	Jack Madgen	2018	4	0	8	0	8	0
45	Max Lynch	****	0	0	0	0	0	0
46	Mason Cox	2016	14	19	58	71	58	71
47	Mark Keane	****	0	0	0	0	0	0
49	John Noble	2019	5	0	5	0	5	0

=== Squad changes ===
==== In ====
No.	Name	Position	Previous club	via
43	(Republic of Ireland) Anton Tohill	Defender	Derry GAA	Category B rookie selection
47	(Republic of Ireland) Mark Keane	Defender	Cork GAA	Category B rookie selection
23	(Victoria (state)) Jordan Roughead	Ruckman / Defender	Western Bulldogs	trade
11	(Queensland) Dayne Beams	Midfielder	Brisbane Lions	trade
35	(Victoria (state)) Isaac Quaynor	Defender	Oakleigh Chargers	AFL National Draft, first round (pick No. 13), Next Generation Academy selection
27	(Victoria (state)) Will Kelly	Defender	Oakleigh Chargers	AFL National Draft, second round (pick No. 29), Father–son rule selection - son of Craig Kelly
40	(Victoria (state)) Atu Bosenavulagi	Forward	Oakleigh Chargers	AFL National Draft, fifth round (pick No. 77), Next Generation Academy selection
29	(South Australia) Tim Broomhead	Midfielder	Collingwood	AFL Rookie Draft, first round (pick No. 17)
9	(Victoria (state)) Sam Murray	Defender	Collingwood	AFL Rookie Draft, second round (pick No. 33)
49	(South Australia) John Noble	Winger	West Adelaide	AFL Mid-season Draft, first round (pick No. 14)

==== Out ====
No.	Name	Position	New Club	via
1	(Western Australia) Alex Fasolo	Forward	Carlton	free agent
9	(Victoria (state)) Sam Murray	Defender		delisted
11	(Victoria (state)) Jarryd Blair	Forward		delisted
23	(Victoria (state)) Sam McLarty	Defender		delisted
27	(Victoria (state)) Kayle Kirby	Forward		retired
29	(South Australia) Tim Broomhead	Midfielder		delisted
40	(Queensland) Josh Smith	Midfielder		delisted
43	(Queensland) Adam Oxley	Defender		delisted

== AFL season ==
=== Pre-season matches ===
Collingwood's 2019 scratch matches
Date and local time	Opponent	Scores^{[a]}			Venue	Ref
Date and local time	Opponent	Home	Away	Result	Venue	Ref
Friday, 22 February (10:00 am)	Melbourne	7.6 (48)	11.6 (72)	Lost by 24 points	Olympic Park Oval [H]	

Collingwood's 2019 JLT Community Series fixtures
Date and local time	Opponent	Scores^{[a]}			Venue	Attendance	Ref
Date and local time	Opponent	Home	Away	Result	Venue	Attendance	Ref
Monday, 4 March (3:40 pm)	Fremantle	12.12 (84)	17.9 (111)	Won by 27 points	HBF Arena [A]	5,245	
Monday, 11 March (2:10 pm)	Carlton	11.11 (77)	10.13 (73)	Won by 4 points	Morwell Recreation Reserve [H]	6,386	

=== Regular season ===
Collingwood's 2019 AFL season fixtures
Round	Date and local time	Opponent	Home	Away	Result	Venue	Attendance	Ladder position	Ref
Round	Date and local time	Opponent	Scores^{[a]}			Venue	Attendance	Ladder position	Ref
1	Friday, 22 March (7:50 pm)	Geelong	9.11 (65)	10.12 (72)	Lost by 7 points	MCG [H]	78,017	11th	
2	Thursday, 28 March (7:20 pm)	Richmond	10.6 (66)	17.8 (110)	Won by 44 points	MCG [A]	70,699	7th	
3	Saturday, 6 April (7:25 pm)	West Coast	11.10 (76)	15.8 (98)	Lost by 22 points	MCG [H]	60,878	11th	
4	Friday, 12 April (7:50 pm)	Western Bulldogs	11.12 (78)	9.10 (64)	Won by 14 points	MCG [H]	59,257	8th	
5	Thursday, 18 April (7:35 pm)	Brisbane Lions	8.13 (61)	18.15 (123)	Won by 62 points	Gabba [A]	34,017	4th	
6	Thursday, 25 April (3:20 pm)	Essendon	10.9 (69)	10.13 (73)	Won by 4 points	MCG [A]	92,241	3rd	
7	Friday, 3 May (7:50 pm)	Port Adelaide	15.18 (108)	10.9 (69)	Won by 39 points	Marvel Stadium [H]	37,559	2nd	
8	Saturday, 11 May (1:45 pm)	Carlton	13.9 (87)	16.10 (106)	Won by 19 points	MCG [A]	69,289	2nd	
9	Saturday, 18 May (1:45 pm)	St Kilda	17.10 (112)	10.11 (71)	Won by 41 points	MCG [H]	60,702	2nd	
10	Friday, 24 May (7:50 pm)	Sydney	11.7 (73)	11.14 (80)	Won by 7 points	SCG [A]	34,649	2nd	
11	Saturday, 1 June (1:45 pm)	Fremantle	11.9 (75)	11.13 (79)	Lost by 4 points	MCG [H]	41,774	3rd	
12	Monday, 10 June (3:20 pm)	Melbourne	15.8 (98)	7.15 (57)	Won by 41 points	MCG [H]	74,036	2nd	
13	Bye							3rd	
14	Sunday, 23 June (3:20 pm)	Western Bulldogs	10.13 (73)	13.4 (82)	Won by 9 points	Marvel Stadium [A]	39,836	2nd	
15	Saturday, 29 June (7:25 pm)	North Melbourne	5.7 (37)	11.15 (81)	Lost by 44 points	Marvel Stadium [H]	38,801	2nd	
16	Friday, 5 July (7:50 pm)	Hawthorn	9.13 (67)	9.9 (63)	Lost by 4 points	MCG [A]	66,407	3rd	
17	Friday, 12 July (6:10 pm)	West Coast	12.5 (77)	11.12 (78)	Won by 1 point	Optus Stadium [A]	56,251	2nd	
18	Saturday, 20 July (4:35 pm)	Greater Western Sydney	19.8 (122)	11.9 (75)	Lost by 47 points	GIANTS Stadium [A]	15,467	4th	
19	Friday, 26 July (7:50 pm)	Richmond	9.12 (66)	14.14 (98)	Lost by 32 points	MCG [H]	78,722	6th	
20	Sunday, 4 August (1:10 pm)	Gold Coast	18.12 (120)	8.3 (51)	Won by 69 points	MCG [H]	33,577	6th	
21	Saturday, 10 August (1:45 pm)	Melbourne	7.11 (53)	10.10 (70)	Won by 17 points	MCG [A]	31,903	5th	
22	Saturday, 17 August (4:05 pm)	Adelaide	6.12 (48)	17.12 (114)	Won by 66 points	Adelaide Oval [A]	48,175	5th	
23	Friday, 23 August (7:50 pm)	Essendon	10.16 (76)	10.5 (65)	Won by 11 points	MCG [H]	85,405	4th	

=== Finals series ===
Collingwood's 2019 AFL finals series fixtures
Round	Date and local time	Opponent	Home	Away	Result	Venue	Attendance	Ref
Round	Date and local time	Opponent	Scores^{[a]}			Venue	Attendance	Ref
1st Qualifying Final	Friday, 6 September (7:50 pm)	Geelong	7.9 (51)	9.7 (61)	Won by 10 points	MCG [A]	93,436	
1st Preliminary Final	Saturday, 21 September (4:35 pm)	Greater Western Sydney	7.10 (52)	8.8 (56)	Lost by 4 points	MCG [H]	77,828	
Collingwood was eliminated from the 2019 AFL finals series

=== Ladder ===
Pos	Team	Pld	W	L	D	PF	PA	PP	Pts	Qualification
1	Geelong	22	16	6	0	1984	1462	135.7	64	Finals series
2	Brisbane Lions	22	16	6	0	2004	1694	118.3	64	Finals series
3	Richmond (P)	22	16	6	0	1892	1664	113.7	64	Finals series
4	Collingwood	22	15	7	0	1885	1601	117.7	60	Finals series
5	West Coast	22	15	7	0	1902	1691	112.5	60	Finals series
6	Greater Western Sydney	22	13	9	0	1926	1669	115.4	52	Finals series
7	Western Bulldogs	22	12	10	0	1941	1810	107.2	48	Finals series
8	Essendon	22	12	10	0	1702	1784	95.4	48	Finals series
9	Hawthorn	22	11	11	0	1742	1602	108.7	44	
10	Port Adelaide	22	11	11	0	1806	1714	105.4	44	
11	Adelaide	22	10	12	0	1776	1761	100.9	40	
12	North Melbourne	22	10	12	0	1824	1834	99.5	40	
13	Fremantle	22	9	13	0	1579	1718	91.9	36	
14	St Kilda	22	9	13	0	1645	1961	83.9	36	
15	Sydney	22	8	14	0	1706	1746	97.7	32	
16	Carlton	22	7	15	0	1609	1905	84.5	28	
17	Melbourne	22	5	17	0	1569	1995	78.6	20	
18	Gold Coast	22	3	19	0	1351	2232	60.5	12	

Source: AFL Tables
Rules for classification: 1) points; 2) percentage; 3) number of points for.
(P) Premiers

=== Awards & Milestones ===
==== AFL Awards ====
- Anzac Medal – Scott Pendlebury (Round 6)
- Neale Daniher Trophy – Adam Treloar (Round 12)
- 2019 All-Australian team – Brodie Grundy, Scott Pendlebury

==== AFL Award Nominations ====
- 2019 All-Australian team 40-man squad – Brodie Grundy, Adam Treloar, Scott Pendlebury

==== Club Awards ====
- E.W. Copeland Trophy – Brodie Grundy
- R.T. Rush Trophy – Scott Pendlebury
- J.J. Joyce Trophy – Jack Crisp
- J.F. McHale Trophy – Adam Treloar
- Jack Regan Trophy – Brayden Maynard
- Joseph Wren Memorial Trophy – Alex Woodward
- Darren Millane Memorial Trophy – Jeremy Howe
- Harry Collier Trophy – John Noble
- Gordon Coventry Trophy – Brody Mihocek
- Gavin Brown Award – Callum Brown
- Bob Rose Award – Jeremy Howe

==== Milestones ====
- Round 1 – Jordan Roughead (Collingwood debut)
- Round 4 – Chris Mayne (200 AFL games)
- Round 6 – Mason Cox (50 games (first American to hit this milestone))
- Round 6 – Jordan De Goey (100 goals)
- Round 7 – Will Hoskin-Elliott (50 Collingwood games)
- Round 8 – Jack Crisp (100 Collingwood games)
- Round 8 – Jaidyn Stephenson (50 goals)
- Round 16 – Isaac Quaynor (AFL debut)
- Round 17 – John Noble (AFL debut)
- Round 17 – Brody Mihocek (50 goals)
- Round 20 – Jamie Elliott (100 games)
- Qualifying Final – Scott Pendlebury (300 games)
- Qualifying Final – Taylor Adams (100 Collingwood games)
- Qualifying Final – Taylor Adams (50 AFL goals)
- Preliminary Final – Ben Reid (150 games)
- Preliminary Final – James Aish (50 Collingwood games)

== VFL season ==
=== Pre-season matches ===
Collingwood's 2019 VFL pre-season fixture
Date and local time	Opponent	Home	Away	Result	Venue	Ref
Date and local time	Opponent	Scores^{[a]}			Venue	Ref
Sunday, 10 March (2:00 pm)	Northern Blues	7.4 (46)	7.4 (46)	Draw	Holden Centre [H]	
Friday, 15 March (7:00 pm)	Coburg	9.6 (60)	5.5 (35)	Won by 25 points	Holden Centre [H]	
Friday, 22 March (4:00 pm)	Geelong	7.12 (54)	10.11 (71)	Lost by 17 points	Holden Centre [H]	
Thursday, 28 March (7:00 pm)	Richmond	15.9 (99)	6.9 (45)	Lost by 54 points	Punt Road Oval [A]	

=== Regular season ===
Collingwood's 2019 VFL season fixture
Round	Date and local time	Opponent	Home	Away	Result	Venue	Ladder position	Ref
Round	Date and local time	Opponent	Scores^{[a]}			Venue	Ladder position	Ref
1	Saturday, 6 April (2:00 pm)	Coburg	11.7 (73)	11.10 (76)	Won by 3 points	Piranha Park [A]	7th	
2	Friday, 12 April (4:30 pm)	Footscray	6.4 (40)	17.10 (112)	Lost by 72 points	Olympic Park Oval [H]	9th	
3	Saturday, 20 April (2:00 pm)	Northern Blues	11.11 (77)	11.14 (80)	Lost by 3 points	Victoria Park [H]	13th	
4	Saturday, 27 April (2:00 pm)	Essendon	15.12 (102)	9.11 (65)	Lost by 37 points	Windy Hill [A]	13th	
5	Bye						13th	
6	Sunday, 12 May (2:00 pm)	Sandringham	8.7 (55)	7.16 (56)	Lost by 1 point	Victoria Park [H]	13th	
7	Sunday, 19 May (1:00 pm)	Geelong	10.8 (68)	9.7 (61)	Lost by 7 points	GMHBA Stadium [A]	13th	
8	Saturday, 25 May (2:00 pm)	Box Hill	12.7 (79)	9.11 (65)	Won by 14 points	Victoria Park [H]	12th	
9	Sunday, 2 June (2:00 pm)	Port Melbourne	15.16 (106)	10.4 (64)	Lost by 42 points	Adcon Stadium [A]	12th	
10	Sunday, 9 June (2:10 pm)	Casey	15.12 (102)	6.3 (39)	Lost by 63 points	Casey Fields [A]	12th	
11	Bye						12th	
12	Sunday, 23 June (11:00 am)	Footscray	8.10 (58)	12.9 (81)	Won by 23 points	Marvel Stadium [A]	12th	
13	Saturday, 29 June	North Melbourne	9.7 (61)	6.5 (41)	Won by 20 points	Marvel Stadium [H]	12th	
14	Saturday, 6 July (2:00 pm)	Werribee	11.11 (77)	12.8 (80)	Won by 3 points	Avalon Airport Oval [A]	11th	
15	Saturday, 13 July (2:00 pm)	Williamstown	6.11 (47)	7.13 (55)	Lost by 8 points	Victoria Park [H]	11th	
16	Sunday, 21 July (2:00 pm)	Frankston	7.11 (53)	7.14 (56)	Won by 3 points	Skybus Stadium [A]	11th	
17	Friday, 26 July (4:30 pm)	Richmond	4.1 (25)	11.14 (80)	Lost by 55 points	Olympic Park Oval [H]	11th	
18	Sunday, 4 August (11:40 am)	Northern Blues	5.7 (37)	12.13 (85)	Won by 48 points	Marvel Stadium [A]	11th	
19	Sunday, 11 August (12:00 pm)	Casey	5.12 (42)	8.9 (57)	Lost by 15 points	Olympic Park Oval [H]	11th	
20	Bye						11th	
21	Saturday, 24 August (2:00 pm)	Box Hill	11.10 (75)	7.15 (57)	Lost by 18 points	Box Hill City Oval [A]	11th	

=== Ladder ===
Pos	Team	Pld	W	L	D	PF	PA	PP	Pts	Qualification
1	Richmond (P)	18	16	2	0	1550	1144	135.5	64	Finals series
2	Footscray	18	14	3	1	1651	1120	147.4	58	Finals series
3	Williamstown	18	13	4	1	1442	1183	121.9	54	Finals series
4	Essendon	18	12	6	0	1627	1222	133.1	48	Finals series
5	Werribee	18	11	7	0	1579	1236	127.8	44	Finals series
6	Geelong	18	11	7	0	1487	1215	122.4	44	Finals series
7	Port Melbourne	18	10	7	1	1552	1399	110.9	42	Finals series
8	Box Hill	18	9	8	1	1413	1268	111.4	38	Finals series
9	Casey	18	9	9	0	1211	1183	102.4	36	
10	Northern Blues	18	7	11	0	1288	1500	85.9	28	
11	Collingwood	18	7	11	0	1090	1298	84.0	28	
12	Sandringham	18	6	12	0	1163	1488	78.2	24	
13	North Melbourne	18	5	13	0	1235	1777	69.5	20	
14	Coburg	18	2	16	0	1204	1719	70.0	8	
15	Frankston	18	1	17	0	1002	1742	57.5	4	

Rules for classification: 1) points; 2) percentage; 3) number of points for.

== Women's season ==
=== Pre-season matches ===
Collingwood's 2019 AFLW pre-season fixture
Date and local time	Opponent	Home	Away	Result	Venue	Ref
Date and local time	Opponent	Scores^{[a]}			Venue	Ref
Saturday, 19 January (5:00 pm)	Western Bulldogs	5.5 (35)	4.4 (28)	Lost by 7 points	Mars Stadium [A]	

=== Regular season ===
Collingwood's 2019 AFL Women's season fixture
Round	Date and local time	Opponent	Home	Away	Result	Venue	Attendance	Ladder position	Ref
Round	Date and local time	Opponent	Scores^{[a]}			Venue	Attendance	Ladder position	Ref
1	Saturday, 2 February (6:40 pm)	Geelong	3.6 (24)	3.5 (23)	Lost by 1 point	GMHBA Stadium [A]	18,429	3rd	
2	Saturday, 9 February (4:45 pm)	Melbourne	1.3 (9)	3.8 (26)	Lost by 17 points	Victoria Park [H]	7,228	4th	
3	Saturday, 16 February (4:15 pm)	Fremantle	7.9 (51)	2.6 (18)	Lost by 33 points	Fremantle Oval [A]	5,443	5th	
4	Sunday, 24 February (2:05 pm)	Greater Western Sydney	4.3 (27)	5.6 (36)	Lost by 9 points	Morwell Recreation Reserve [H]	1,743	5th	
5	Saturday, 2 March (7:15 pm)	Carlton	4.10 (34)	4.5 (29)	Lost by 5 points	Ikon Park [A]	3,215	5th	
6	Saturday, 9 March (4:45 pm)	North Melbourne	5.1 (35)	7.11 (53)	Lost by 18 points	Marvel Stadium [H]	10,612	5th	
7	Sunday, 17 March (2:05 pm)	Brisbane	3.7 (25)	2.7 (19)	Won by 6 points	Victoria Park [H]	2,030	5th	

=== Ladder ===
Conference B
Pos	Team	Pld	W	L	D	PF	PA	PP	Pts	Qualification
1	Carlton	7	4	3	0	257	258	99.6	16	Preliminary finals
2	Geelong	7	3	4	0	154	235	65.5	12	Preliminary finals
3	Greater Western Sydney	7	2	5	0	208	295	70.5	8	
4	Brisbane	7	2	5	0	193	274	70.4	8	
5	Collingwood	7	1	6	0	162	243	66.7	4	

Source: womens.afl
Rules for classification: 1) points; 2) percentage; 3) number of points for.

=== Squad ===
Players are listed by guernsey number, and 2019 statistics are for AFL Women's regular season and finals series matches during the 2019 AFL Women's season only. Career statistics include a player's complete AFL Women's career, which, as a result, means that a player's debut and part or whole of their career statistics may be for another club. Statistics are correct as of Round 7 of the 2019 season (17 March 2019) and are taken from Australian Football.

No.	Name	AFLW debut	Games (2019)	Goals (2019)	Games (CFC)	Goals (CFC)	Games (AFLW career)	Goals (AFLW career)
1	Sharni Layton	2019	6	0	6	0	6	0
2	Chloe Molloy	2018	0	0	7	1	7	1
3	Nicole Hildebrand	2017 (Brisbane)	2	0	2	0	15	0
4	Sarah D'Arcy	2017	5	4	17	6	17	6
5	Emma Grant	2017	6	1	20	2	20	2
6	Jordyn Allen	2019	7	1	7	1	7	1
7	Sarah Rowe	2019	7	2	7	2	7	2
8	Brittany Bonnici	2017	7	0	21	1	21	1
9	Melissa Kuys	2017	2	0	15	2	15	2
10	Ashleigh Brazill	2018	6	0	8	0	8	0
11	Eliza Hynes	2018	6	0	8	0	8	0
12	Stacey Livingstone	2017	7	0	16	0	16	0
13	Jaimee Lambert	2017 (Western Bulldogs)	7	3	14	4	20	9
15	Erica Fowler	2019	2	0	2	0	2	0
16	Katie Lynch	2019	6	1	6	1	6	1
17	Steph Chiocci (c)	2017	7	1	19	4	19	4
18	Ruby Schleicher	2017	6	0	16	0	16	0
19	Georgie Parker	2018	1	0	3	0	3	0
20	Cecilia McIntosh	2017	4	0	17	1	17	1
21	Iilish Ross	2018	6	0	11	0	11	0
22	Sophie Casey	2017	7	0	15	1	15	1
23	Lauren Butler	2019	3	0	3	0	3	0
24	Sophie Alexander	2019	4	1	4	1	4	1
25	Mikala Cann	2019	4	0	4	0	4	0
28	Holly Whitford	2018	1	0	4	0	4	0
31	Jordan Membrey	2017 (Brisbane)	3	2	3	2	8	3
32	Georgia Gourlay	2019	5	0	5	0	5	0
34	Darcy Guttridge	2019	3	3	3	3	3	3
35	Maddie Shevlin	2019	5	1	5	1	5	1
41	Kristy Stratton	2018	5	0	7	0	7	0
46	Sarah Dargan	2018	7	2	10	2	10	2

==== Squad changes ====
In

No.	Name	Position	Previous club	via
3	(Victoria (state)) Nicole Hildebrand	Defender	Brisbane	trade
7	(Republic of Ireland) Sarah Rowe	Forward	Mayo GAA	rookie signing
1	(Victoria (state)) Sharni Layton	Defender	Collingwood Magpies Netball	rookie signing
6	(Victoria (state)) Jordyn Allen	Defender / Midfielder	Dandenong Stingrays	AFLW National Draft, first round (pick No. 5)
16	(Victoria (state)) Katie Lynch	Midfielder / Forward	Oakleigh Chargers	AFLW National Draft, first round (pick No. 11)
25	(Victoria (state)) Mikala Cann	Midfielder	Eastern Ranges	AFLW National Draft, second round (pick No. 13)
23	(Victoria (state)) Lauren Butler	Defender	GWV Rebels	AFLW National Draft, second round (pick No. 18)
35	(Australian Capital Territory) Maddie Shevlin	Midfielder	Gungahlin Jets	AFLW National Draft, second round (pick No. 19)
24	(Victoria (state)) Sophie Alexander	Forward	Collingwood Reserves	AFLW National Draft, third round (pick No. 29)
32	(Victoria (state)) Georgia Gourlay	Defender / Midfielder	Casey Demons	AFLW National Draft, third round (pick No. 32)
31	(Victoria (state)) Jordan Membrey	Midfielder / Forward	Wilston Grange	AFLW National Draft, fifth round (pick No. 51)
15	(Queensland) Erica Fowler	Forward	Collingwood Reserves	AFLW National Draft, ninth round (pick No. 70)

Out

No.	Name	Position	New Club	via
27	(Victoria (state)) Jess Duffin	Forward	North Melbourne	expansion club signing
43	(Victoria (state)) Jasmine Garner	Forward	North Melbourne	expansion club signing
23	(Victoria (state)) Moana Hope	Forward	North Melbourne	expansion club signing
60	(Western Australia) Emma King	Ruck	North Melbourne	expansion club signing
6	(Victoria (state)) Christina Bernardi	Midfielder / Forward	Greater Western Sydney	trade
38	(Victoria (state)) Amelia Barden	Midfielder	Carlton	trade
1	(Western Australia) Caitlyn Edwards	Defender		retired
7	(Victoria (state)) Lauren Tesoriero	Midfielder / Forward		delisted
26	(Western Australia) Tara Morgan	Defender		delisted
20	(Victoria (state)) Cecilia McIntosh	Defender		retired

=== League awards ===
- Rising Star nomination – Sarah Dargan – Round 4
- Rising Star nomination – Jordyn Allen – Round 7

=== Club Awards ===
- Best and fairest – Jaimee Lambert
- Best first year player – Sarah Rowe
- Players' player award – Ashleigh Brazill
- Leading goalkicker – Sarah D'Arcy (4 goals)
- VFLW Best and Fairest – Jaimee Lambert

=== VFL Women's ===
Collingwood participated in their second consecutive season in the VFL Women's league. Ruby Schleicher and Grace Buchan were named co-captains and Penny Cula-Reid coached the VFLW Magpies for the second year in a row. The Magpies claimed the minor premiership for the second year in a row, and won 12 of 14 matches. The club went on to win their inaugural premiership, defeating the Western Bulldogs by 37 points in the Grand Final at Ikon Park.

== Notes ==
Key

- H Home match.
- A Away match.

Notes

- **^{a}** Collingwood's scores are indicated in **bold** font.
