= Nathan Buckley =

Australian rules footballer (born 1972)

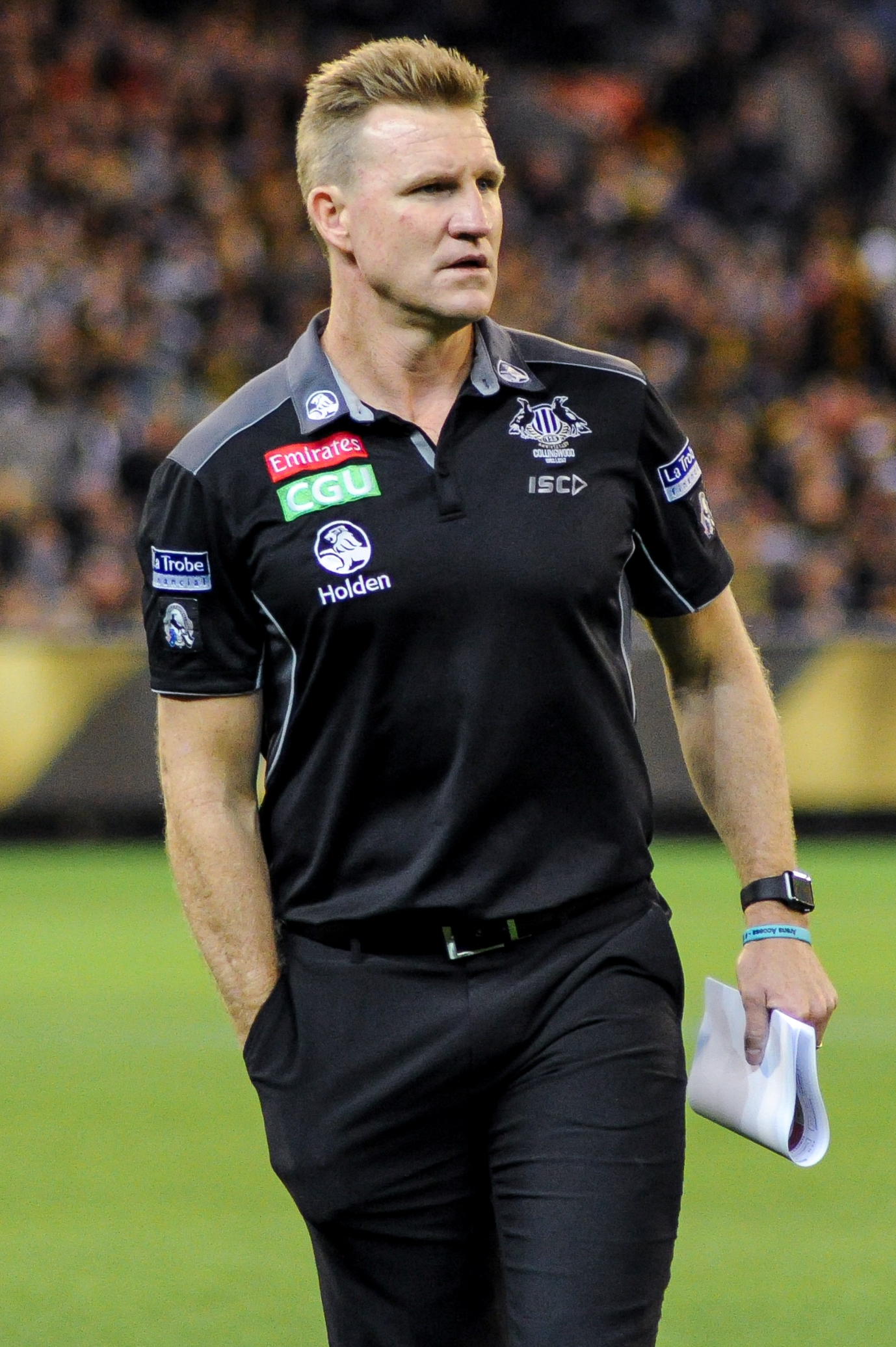
- Buckley with Collingwood in March 2017

Personal information
- Full name: Nathan Charles Buckley
- Nickname: Bucks
- Born: 26 July 1972 (age 54); Adelaide, South Australia
- Original team: Port Adelaide (SANFL)/Southern Districts Football Club
- Draft: Zone selection, Brisbane Bears
- Height: 186 cm (6 ft 1 in)
- Weight: 91 kg (201 lb)
- Position: Midfielder

Playing career^{1}
Years	Club	Games (Goals)
1993	Brisbane Bears	20 (21)
1994–2007	Collingwood	260 (263)
Total		280 (284)

Representative team honours^{2}
Years	Team	Games (Goals)
1993	QLD/NT	1 (0)
1995–1997	Allies	3 (6)
Total		4 (6)

International team honours^{2}
1998–1999	Australia	4 (10)

Coaching career^{3}
Years	Club	Games (W–L–D)
2012–2021	Collingwood	218 (117–99–2)
- ^{1} Playing statistics correct to the end of 2007.^{2} Representative statistics correct as of 1997.^{3} Coaching statistics correct as of 2021.

Career highlights
- AFL: Brownlow Medal: 2003; Norm Smith Medal: 2002; AFLCA Champion Player of the Year: 2003; 7× All-Australian team: 1996, 1997, 1998, 1999, 2000, 2001, 2003; AFL Rising Star: 1993; AFL Rising Star nominee: 1993; Herald Sun Player of the Year: 1998; Australian Football League life member: 2006; Australian Football Hall of Fame: 2011; Collingwood: 6× Copeland Trophy: 1994, 1996, 1998, 1999, 2000, 2003; R.T. Rush Trophy (2nd B&F): 1997; J.J. Joyce Trophy (3rd B&F): 2001; Bob Rose Award (Best Finals Player): 2003; Collingwood captain: 1999–2007; Collingwood Football Club Hall of Fame: 2004; Collingwood Football Club life member: 2004; Collingwood Team of the Century; SANFL: Port Adelaide Premiership player: 1992; Magarey Medal: 1992; Jack Oatey Medal: 1992; John Cahill Medal: 1992; Representative: Jesaulenko Medal: 1997; Captain of the Allies: 1997; International Rules 1998–1999; Coaching: AFLCA Coach of the Year: 2018

Nathan Charles Buckley (born 26 July 1972) is a former professional Australian rules football senior coach, player and commentator.

He is listed by journalist Mike Sheahan as one of the top 50 players of all time. Buckley won the inaugural Rising Star Award, in 1993, then went on to become one of the game's elite, captaining Collingwood between 1999 and 2007, winning the Norm Smith Medal for best player afield in the 2002 Grand Final despite playing in the losing team, only the third player in history to do so, the Brownlow Medal in 2003, winning Collingwood's Best and Fairest award, the Copeland Trophy, six times and named in the Collingwood Team of the Century. Buckley was selected in the All-Australian Team seven times and captained the Australian international rules football team against Ireland.

In 2004 Buckley became an original inductee into the Collingwood Hall of Fame. He retired at the conclusion of the 2007 AFL season before serving as Collingwood assistant coach for seasons 2010 (including being assistant coach in the 2010 premiership team) and 2011, and as senior coach in 2012 which he served until stepping down mid-way through the 2021 maintaining an overall positive career coaching record.

== Playing career ==
=== Early career ===
Nathan Buckley was born in suburban Adelaide, South Australia, on 26 July 1972. His family travelled around Australia quite frequently, and by the age of 12, Buckley had been to all major states on the Australian mainland. He grew up supporting Melbourne Football Club.

Buckley spent the majority of his football-developing years (aged around 10–17) in the Northern Territory, and thus he has occasionally been regarded as a Territorian. He rebelled at the age of 14, opting to play tennis rather than football, but then his father Ray sent him to boarding school at Victoria's Salesian College in Sunbury to rekindle his enthusiasm in a footy environment. He played his junior football at the Nightcliff Football Club, representing the Northern Territory at school level in 1983 and 1984, and first played senior football at Southern Districts in Darwin. He completed his schooling at St John's College, Darwin. While at St John's, he played school football alongside a number of other future AFL players including Scott Chisholm, Ronnie Burns, Andrew McLeod and Michael Long. He also played alongside various members of the famous Rioli family during his time at St John's.

He also played cricket for the "PINTS" social club, alongside Michael Tunn from Triple J. He also played at the Ainslie Football Club in the Canberra-based ACTAFL for a season alongside James Hird when he was 13. During his one year living in Canberra, he attended Daramalan College. In State of Origin he was considered of Northern Territory origin and was selected for a combined Queensland/Northern Territory team and The Allies (a composite team representing several states including the Northern Territory).

=== Port Adelaide (SANFL) ===
Buckley's footballing talents were noticed from an early age. He joined South Australian National Football League (SANFL) club Port Adelaide where, in 1992, he won his only senior premiership as well as the Magarey Medal (the SANFL's league best and fairest), the Jack Oatey Medal (best on ground in the SANFL Grand Final), and his club best and fairest. While playing for Port Adelaide he studied Town Planning for two years at the University of South Australia.

=== Brisbane Bears ===
In the 1991 AFL draft struggling Australian Football League (AFL) club Brisbane Bears drafted him through its Northern Territory state zone. Buckley challenged the AFL draft system and sparked controversy by initially resisting a move to Brisbane. His dreams were to play in Melbourne due to its culture in the sport, therefore felt the Bears were an undesirable career option. However, AFL draft rules prevented him from playing with another AFL club and so remained in the SANFL.

Buckley signed with the Bears for the 1993 AFL season as part of a deal between Buckley and the Bears that allowed him to go to the club of his choice the following season. Brisbane hoped his time in Queensland would be long enough to change his mind. Buckley immediately demonstrated his potential, playing 20 games, kicking 21 goals and impressing with his general play. He was the inaugural winner of the Norwich Rising Star Award and finished a close second in the Bears' best-and-fairest award.

=== Collingwood Football Club ===
During his first season, Buckley's arrangement with the Bears became common knowledge. At the end of the contract he attracted strong interest from all Melbourne-based clubs, chiefly Collingwood, Geelong and North Melbourne. However, it was Collingwood that successfully arranged a trade deal acceptable to all parties. Unknown to other AFL clubs and to the AFL itself, Collingwood and Brisbane had already agreed to make the trade happen. Collingwood selected ten players on its list who were "untouchable", and the Bears could take any two players outside this list, as well as Collingwood's first round draft pick, in exchange for Buckley. The move saw Buckley move to Collingwood in exchange for Craig Starcevich, Troy Lehmann and the Magpies' first-round draft pick (no. 12, future double-premiership player Chris Scott).

Buckley was adamant that the move was the right career direction, with the belief he had more chance of winning a premiership with Collingwood. Ironically, Brisbane would go on to win three premierships during Buckley's playing career to Collingwood's none, with Brisbane even beating Collingwood in two consecutive AFL Grand Finals in 2002 and 2003. In his first season with Collingwood, the Magpies were eliminated by the West Coast Eagles by two points in Perth.

From here, Buckley would be a consistent performer for Collingwood. As well as winning a Brownlow Medal in 2003, he finished in the top three twice before the turn of the century. He was also named Collingwood's Best and Fairest six times in 10 years (including one tied), as well as six consecutive years in the All-Australian Team from 1996 to 2002.

In 1999, Buckley suffered a broken jaw playing against Carlton in Round 2. He returned in Round 8 to help Collingwood to their first win of the season and their first in 13 matches. Collingwood finished the season last for only the second time in their history (the other being in 1976). Buckley competed in the last game at Collingwood's long-time home ground Victoria Park against one of their main rivals, the Brisbane Lions.

==== Collingwood captain ====
In 1999, senior coach Tony Shaw made Buckley the Collingwood captain, replacing the still-active Gavin Brown who was to mentor Buckley in the role until retirement. Throughout the late 1990s/early 2000s Collingwood had several major changes in personnel. Eddie McGuire became president of club in 1998 and Mick Malthouse was appointed coach in 2000. Collingwood finishing 15th in 2000 and ninth in 2001, with Buckley starring in both seasons. In Round 2, 2001, Buckley set a record by amassing 46 disposals, the highest total since quarters were shortened to twenty minutes in 1994 AFL season, this remained the record until Round 10, 2009, when surpassed by Dane Swan (48 disposals).

In 2002, Collingwood made the AFL Grand Final for the first time during Buckley's tenure at the club. In one of the great individual grand final performances, Buckley won the Norm Smith Medal for best on ground, the first time since 1989 that a player from a losing side had won the award. The fact that Collingwood was so close in the end had to do with his dominance against the vaunted Brisbane midfield, including captain Michael Voss. In 2003, Buckley received his highest individual honour, the Brownlow Medal in a three-way tie with fellow South Australian-born players Mark Ricciuto (Adelaide) and Adam Goodes (Sydney). The following Saturday Buckley played in his second losing grand final, with Collingwood losing to the Brisbane Lions. Buckley was his team's leading ball winner, with 24 disposals.

After perhaps the best season of his stellar career in 2003, the Magpie skipper endured 2004 and 2005 seasons he would rather forget. He started the season in usual domineering fashion in the opening three rounds, but missed seven of the next eight matches with hamstring problems. When he returned, he appeared to play under duress, spending more time across half-forward or half-back. Buckley was honoured with life membership of the Collingwood Football Club in 2004. During the 2006 season, Buckley was awarded AFL Life Membership after playing his 300th official AFL match since his debut in 1993 (comprising 268 premiership matches, 24 pre-season matches, four State of Origin matches and four International Rules matches).

Buckley was rested twice during the season, once for the match against West Coast at Subiaco in Round 7, and again in the Round 21 clash against Carlton. At the end of the 2006 season Buckley indicated the possibility of him standing down as captain of the club, saying that James Clement might be a likely choice for the position. Clement later said he did not wish to become captain. Collingwood President Eddie McGuire played down any rumours of Buckley standing aside.

Following serious hamstring problems, Buckley played his first game of 2007 playing for the Williamstown Seagulls in the VFL on 18 August 2007. He was judged best on ground, gathering 29 possessions and kicking four goals.

He returned to the Collingwood side the following week and played in the club's two remaining home-and-away games and all three finals, including its 18-point semi-final win against West Coast in extra time, and its five-point loss against Geelong in the preliminary final where he was sitting on the bench in disappointment when the final siren sounded. Three weeks later, on 5 October 2007, Buckley announced his retirement.

== Coaching career ==
=== Collingwood Football Club ===
After months of speculation, Buckley signed a 5-year deal with the Collingwood Football Club and in July 2009, Collingwood Football Club President Eddie McGuire produced a succession plan in which senior coach Malthouse was to hand over the coaching reins to club legend and assistant coach Buckley at the end of the 2011 season. He was the assistant coach under senior coach Malthouse for the 2010 season, including being part of the club's coaching panel in the club's 2010 Premiership victory, and in the 2011 season; he then became senior coach in 2012, having taken over from Mick Malthouse, as part of the planned transition under the two year succession plan, initially signing for a period of three years as senior coach of the Collingwood Football Club.

Collingwood under Buckley began the 2012 season shakily, losing to Hawthorn in round 1 and being thrashed by Carlton in Round 3. However, they recovered to win their next ten matches and finish the home-and-away season in fourth place with a record of 16–6. They were defeated by Hawthorn in the Qualifying Final before bouncing back to defeat West Coast in the semi-final. However, they lost comfortably to eventual premier Sydney in the Preliminary Final at ANZ Stadium to bring an end to the 2012 season.

2013 started poorly for the Magpies under Buckley, slumping to a 5–4 record after 9 games. They couldn't quite find the consistency of previous seasons and finished the year in sixth place with a 14–8 record. They played Port Adelaide in their Elimination Final at the MCG and slumped to a shock 24-point loss, which caused Buckley to call into question the club's culture.

Buckley's contract was extended until the end of 2016 by Collingwood in early March 2014; however, Collingwood produced a poor performance in round 1 and lost to 2013 grand finalists Fremantle by 70 points. They ended up missing the finals to finish 12th at the end of the 2014 season partly due to an injury crisis. Collingwood's 2015 season under Buckley fell into two distinct halves. After round 11 (with a bye in round 12), the Pies' record was 8–3, including a gutsy win against Essendon on Anzac Day on the 100th centenary of the Gallipoli landing. They were fourth on the ladder. Post-bye Collingwood won just two of the remaining 11 games and finished out of the finals again, 12th on the ladder with an overall 10–12 record. A lop-sided fixture and injuries contributed, but Buckley came in for criticism too. During this period Buckley was rebuilding Collingwood's playing list extensively. Buckley's personal connection with young GWS star Adam Treloar helped secure the player for Collingwood in the 2015 trade period.

In March 2016 Buckley was given a one-year contract extension to the end of 2017. Collingwood CEO Gary Pert denied the short contract reflected a lack of faith in Buckley, saying it reflected 'the current state of the industry'. The Magpies' 2016 season commenced with a heavy 80-point loss at the hands of Sydney and what would be a career-ending injury for Dane Swan. Collingwood rallied the following week, producing an extraordinary 1-point comeback win over Richmond. But the season was again one of failure overall, with injuries to senior players and poor form of others being a factor. They ended 12th on the ladder again with a 9–13 record. Buckley took some heart from a strong finish to the season. Many assumed Buckley would be sacked, but Collingwood honoured his contract extension and Buckley made himself personally accountable for the side's upcoming 2017 season. Poor performance continued into early 2017, with the Magpies losing four of the first five games and being 5–10 after fifteen. Again Collingwood finished the season strongly, with four wins and a draw from the final seven games. They finished 13th on the ladder with a 9–12–1 record.

At the end of Collingwood's 2017 season on 28 August 2017, Buckley was given a two-year contract extension by the club after it undertook a review of the entire football club. In the 2018 season, despite another injury crisis, Buckley still managed to coach Collingwood to their first Grand Final since 2011 by upsetting the minor and reigning premiers Richmond by 39 points in the Preliminary Final. Collingwood lost that Grand Final to the West Coast Eagles by a margin of 5 points with the final score West Coast 11.13 (79) to Collingwood 11.8 (74). Collingwood's improved performance under Buckley earned him another 2-year contract extension to the end of 2021. This form continued into 2019, Collingwood finished fourth on the ladder with a 15–7 record and defeated top-of-the-ladder Geelong in the first week of the finals. But the Pies missed the Grand Final following a heart-breaking 4-point loss to the GWS Giants in the Preliminary Final.

Through the COVID-19-affected 2020 season Collingwood were forced into numerous interstate hubs. The club was fined after Buckley and assistant coach Brenton Sanderson breached COVID protocols during their stay in Western Australia. Collingwood produced a patchy year in terms of form, finishing 8th on the ladder with a 9–7–1 record. The Pies managed a stirring 1-point win over the Eagles in Perth in week 1 of the finals, but were eliminated the following week by Geelong. Buckley supported Collingwood following a tumultuous 2020 trade period which saw three senior players, including Treloar, depart for a modest compensation.

After a poor start to the 2021 AFL season, calls began to rise for Buckley to be sacked. The resignation of McGuire from his position as club president earlier in the year was viewed as potentially putting Buckley's position in danger, since he had been one of Buckley's staunchest supporters. On 9 June 2021, Buckley announced that he would step down as senior coach, effective after the Round 13, 2021 Queen's Birthday match against Melbourne. Collingwood won the match by 17 points; it was their fourth win of the season. Buckley was replaced by assistant coach Robert Harvey as caretaker senior coach of the Collingwood Football Club for the rest of the 2021 season.

=== Geelong Football Club ===
After losing the Melbourne head coaching position to Steven King, Buckley joined Geelong for the 2026 season as an assistant coach. He also continued to work as an analyst at Fox Footy. Buckley, who was the early frontrunner to secure the inaugural Tasmanian Devils head coaching position, lost out to Ken Hinkley. Buckley will continue his assistant role at the Cats in 2027.

== Media ==
Buckley has made several appearances on The Footy Show as a panelist.

He was the central character in an advertising campaign by wireless broadband provider Unwired.

Following his retirement as a player, Buckley was a commentator for the Seven Network and radio station 3AW for the 2008–09 seasons.

He made an appearance as a celebrity racer at the 2008 Australian Grand Prix in Melbourne, in which he came second overall.

Beginning in 2022, Buckley will present the live program Best on Ground on Fox Footy as well as commentating matches for the network.

Buckley joined On The Couch with Garry Lyon and Jonathan Brown every Monday night.

In January 2022, Buckley appeared as a contestant on the eighth season of Network 10's I'm a Celebrity...Get Me Out of Here! Australia, ultimately finishing in third place behind winner Dylan Lewis and runner-up Brooke McClymont.

== Personal life ==
Buckley was involved in the AFL "Laws of the Game" or Rules Committee until he controversially resigned.

On 31 December 2002, Buckley married Tania Minnici. On 4 December 2020, Buckley and wife Tania jointly announced they have separated after 18 years of marriage. Buckley and Minnici have two sons; Jett Charles, who was born on 22 December 2006 and Ayce Dominic, who was born on 21 September 2008. Buckley has been in a relationship with girlfriend Alex Pike, who herself broke up with her husband of nearly 19 years.

Buckley has also moved into harness racing and is the owner of the Group One winner Hurricane Jett, a pacer named after his oldest son and trained by highly successful trainer and Collingwood supporter Jayne Davies.

On 24 September 2008, Nathan Buckley's autobiography, All I Can Be, was published in Australia by Penguin Group.

== Statistics ==
=== Playing statistics ===
Legend
G	Goals	K	Kicks	D	Disposals	T	Tackles
B	Behinds	H	Handballs	M	Marks

Led the league for the season only
Led the league after finals only
Led the league after season and finals

Season	Team	No.	Games	Totals							Averages (per game)						
Season	Team	No.	Games	G	B	K	H	D	M	T	G	B	K	H	D	M	T
1993	Brisbane Bears	11	20	21	26	347	111	458	92	24	1.1	1.3	17.4	5.6	22.9	4.6	1.2
1994	Collingwood	5	23	22	21	376	136	512	102	27	1.0	0.9	16.3	5.9	22.3	4.4	1.2
1995	Collingwood	5	21	13	18	335	115	450	76	28	0.6	0.9	16.0	5.5	21.4	3.6	1.3
1996	Collingwood	5	21	29	16	395	104	499	105	28	1.4	0.8	18.8	5.0	23.8	5.0	1.3
1997	Collingwood	5	22	20	15	453	97	550	116	25	0.9	0.7	20.6	4.4	25.0	5.3	1.1
1998	Collingwood	5	18	18	19	406	125	531	94	36	1.0	1.1	22.6	6.9	29.5	5.2	2.0
1999	Collingwood	5	17	21	8	378	125	503	84	35	1.2	0.5	22.2	7.4	29.6	4.9	2.1
2000	Collingwood	5	21	29	34	457	163	620	123	50	1.4	1.6	21.8	7.8	29.5	5.9	2.4
2001	Collingwood	5	20	14	21	368	158	526	101	58	0.7	1.1	18.4	7.9	26.3	5.1	2.9
2002	Collingwood	5	21	15	19	351	133	484	79	98	0.7	0.9	16.7	6.3	23.0	3.8	4.7
2003	Collingwood	5	24	22	23	458	192	650	102	89	0.9	1.0	19.1	8.0	27.1	4.3	3.7
2004	Collingwood	5	15	12	10	222	97	319	75	48	0.8	0.7	14.8	6.5	21.3	5.0	3.2
2005	Collingwood	5	11	20	14	149	81	230	77	22	1.8	1.3	13.5	7.4	20.9	7.0	2.0
2006	Collingwood	5	21	26	15	318	148	466	154	59	1.2	0.7	15.1	7.0	22.2	7.3	2.8
2007	Collingwood	5	5	2	3	62	27	89	28	15	0.4	0.6	12.4	5.4	17.8	5.6	3.0
Career			280	284	262	5075	1812	6887	1408	642	1.0	0.9	18.1	6.5	24.6	5.0	2.3

== Head coaching record ==
Team	Year	Home and Away Season					Finals				
Team	Year	Won	Lost	Drew	Win %	Finish	Won	Lost	Drew	Win %	Result
COLL	2012	16	6	0	.727	4th out of 18	1	2	0	.333	Lost to Sydney in Preliminary Final
COLL	2013	14	8	0	.636	6th out of 18	0	1	0	.000	Lost to Port Adelaide in Elimination Final
COLL	2014	11	11	0	.500	11th out of 18	—	—	—	—	—
COLL	2015	10	12	0	.455	11th out of 18	—	—	—	—	—
COLL	2016	9	13	0	.409	12th out of 18	—	—	—	—	—
COLL	2017	9	12	1	.432	13th out of 18	—	—	—	—	—
COLL	2018	15	7	0	.682	3rd out of 18	2	2	0	.500	Lost to West Coast in Grand Final
COLL	2019	15	7	0	.682	4th out of 18	1	1	0	.500	Lost to GWS in Preliminary Final
COLL	2020	9	7	1	.559	8th out of 18	1	1	0	.500	Lost to Geelong in Semi Final
COLL	2021	4	9	0	.308	resigned after round 13	—	—	—	—	—
		112	92	2	.549		5	7	0	.417	

== Honours and achievements ==
**Brownlow Medal votes**
Season	Votes
1993	14
1994	7
1995	7
1996	11
1997	13
1998	24
1999	20
2000	18
2001	14
2002	14
**2003**	**22**
2004	4
2005	5
2006	5
2007	—
**Total**	**178**
Key:
Green / **Bold** = Won

- **Team**
  - **SANFL**
    - SANFL premiership (Port Adelaide): 1992
- **Individual**
  - **SANFL**
    - Magarey Medal: 1992
    - Jack Oatey Medal: 1992
    - John Cahill Medal: 1992
  - **AFL**
    - Brownlow Medal: 2003
    - Norm Smith Medal: 2002
    - AFLCA Champion Player of the Year: 2003
    - All-Australian: 1996, 1997, 1998, 1999, 2000 (vc), 2001, 2003 (vc)
    - AFL Rising Star: 1993
    - AFL Rising Star nominee: 1993
    - Copeland Trophy: 1994 (tied with Gavin Brown), 1996, 1998, 1999, 2000, 2003
    - R.T. Rush Trophy: (2nd B&F): 1997
    - J.J. Joyce Trophy: (3rd B&F): 2001
    - Bob Rose Award (Best Finals Player): 2003
    - Alex Jesaulenko Medal: 1997
    - Herald Sun Player of the Year: 1998
    - Australian representative honours in International Rules Series: 1999 (c)
    - State of Origin representative honours for the Allies: 1997
    - Australian Football League life member: 2006
    - Australian Football Hall of Fame: 2011
    - Collingwood Captain: 1999–2007
    - **Collingwood Team of the Century – half-back flank**
