= Craig Kelly (footballer) =

Australian rules footballer (born 1966)

Personal information
- Nickname: Ned
- Born: 16 June 1966 (age 60)
- Original team: Norwood (SANFL)
- Draft: No. 34, 1986 national draft
- Height: 190 cm (6 ft 3 in)
- Weight: 110 kg (243 lb)

Playing career^{1}
Years	Club	Games (Goals)
1984–1988	Norwood	121 (90)
1989–1996	Collingwood	122 (43)
Total		243 (133)
- ^{1} Playing statistics correct to the end of 1996.

Career highlights
- 1990 premiership side

Craig Kelly (born 16 June 1966) is a former Australian rules football player with Collingwood Football Club and served as a successful player manager as well as exploring other sports-related roles. He is the grandson of famous free marketeer and former Government Minister C.R. "Bert" Kelly and the father of former AFL players Will Kelly and Jake Kelly.

== Club career ==
=== Pre-VFL/AFL ===
Kelly began playing top-level football with the Norwood Football Club in the SANFL. He was drafted to Collingwood in the 1986 VFL draft at pick number 34.

=== Collingwood ===
Kelly made his debut in 1989 and became a tough defender. He played a crucial role in the low-scoring 1990 Grand Final, which Collingwood went on to win. The barrel-chested Kelly was known for being a tough and hot-headed footballer. He had many appearances to the tribunal for rough play. One incident occurred in 1992 when playing against Sydney—Kelly charged at Sydney's Ben Doolan, causing many of Doolan's teeth to fall out. Kelly was notorious for pinching opposition players to niggle them, with victims including Richmond's Stephen Jurica, Hawthorn's Jason Dunstall and Geelong duo David Mensch and Gary Ablett, which Ablett mentioned in his 2007 biography. Kelly retired after Collingwood's final match of the 1996 season, a Round 22 win against the Brisbane Bears, along with Alan Richardson.

== Other ventures ==
=== Business ===
After his retirement, Kelly founded Elite Sports Properties with Rob Woodhouse (now TLA Worldwide). The company deals mainly with sports management and marketing. Kelly is a player manager to many top current AFL stars.

=== Coaching ===
Kelly was the coach of the Mansfield Eagles in the Goulburn Valley Football League and coached them to the GV premiership in 2009. He has also played some games for the club.

=== As CEO of Collingwood Magpies Netball Club ===
Kelly was the appointed CEO of Collingwood Magpies Netball Club in 2023, which turned out to be the club's last year due to worsening financial problems and sustained lacklustre on-court performance that pre-dated his appointment.

=== As CEO of Collingwood Football Club ===
In January 2023 Kelly was appointed the new CEO of Collingwood Football Club, succeeding Graham Wright the former interim CEO. In July 2024 the club's former head of First Nations strategy Mark Cleaver sued Collingwood Football Club alleging that Kelly was racist through slurs and inappropriate jokes.
