= Georgia Gourlay =

Australian rules footballer (born 1999)

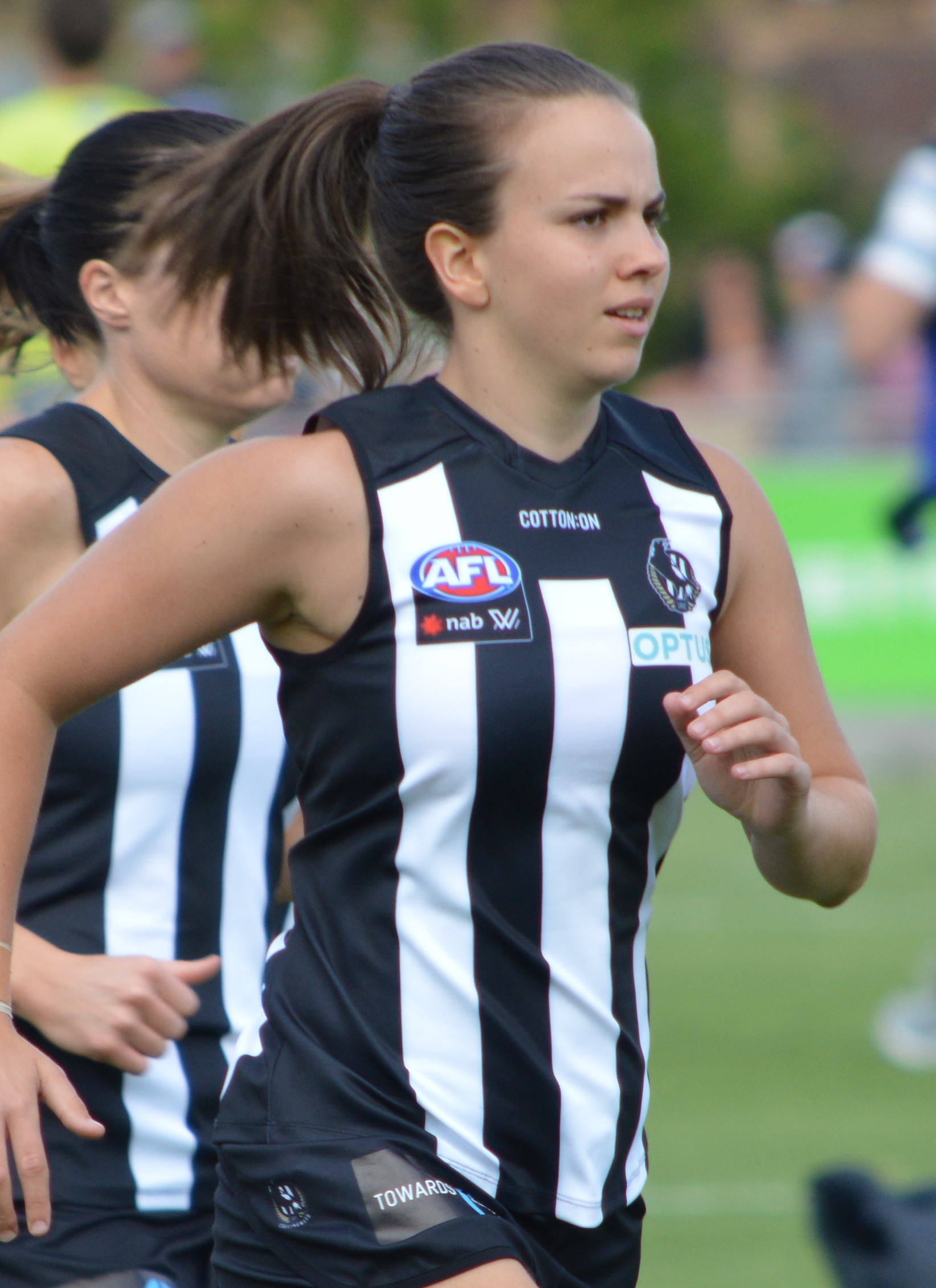
- Gourlay with Collingwood in February 2019

Personal information
- Born: 23 March 1999 (age 27)
- Original team: Dandenong Stingrays (TAC Cup)
- Draft: No. 32, 2018 AFL Women's draft
- Debut: Round 1, 2019, Collingwood vs. Geelong, at GMHBA Stadium
- Height: 167 cm (5 ft 6 in)
- Position: Defender / Midfielder

Playing career^{1}
Years	Club	Games (Goals)
2019–2020	Collingwood	5 (0)
- ^{1} Playing statistics correct to the end of the 2020 season.

Georgia Gourlay (born 23 March 1999) is an Australian rules footballer who played for the Collingwood Football Club in the AFL Women's competition (AFLW).

== Early life and state football ==
Gourlay started out in sports as a long jumper, but turned to Australian rules football after a serious knee injury. Gourlay started out playing football for Cranbourne in the South East Football Netball League. In the AFL Youth Girls National Championships, Gourlay represented Vic Metro, scoring the first goal of the 2014 AFL Youth Girls National Championships Grand Final loss to Western Australia. During the 2015 AFL Youth Girls National Championships, Gourlay ruptured her anterior cruciate ligament (ACL) for the first time and underwent a knee reconstruction surgery. Almost a year later, after rehabilitation, in her first game back she ruptured her ACL again and had to undergo knee reconstruction surgery once more. The year after she was ruled out of the 2017 season, due to her year 12 commitments as well as being diagnosed with tendinitis. In 2018, after more than two years of injuries, Gourlay returned to playing football. She played for Dandenong Stingrays in the TAC Cup, being considered an "outstanding leader with silky skills to match". She also signed with Casey Demons for their VFL Women's (VFLW) season alongside Jordyn Allen and Maddie Shevlin.

== AFL Women's career ==
Gourlay was drafted by Collingwood with the club's seventh selection and the 32nd pick overall in the 2018 AFL Women's draft. The coach Wayne Siekman said that "she is a fantastic person with great resilience." She made her debut along with seven other players in a loss to Geelong at GMHBA Stadium in the opening round of the 2019 season. She went on to play five games in 2019. In round 4 of the 2020 AFL Women's season, Gourlay ruptured her right anterior cruciate ligament during training, for a third time. In August 2020, Gourlay was delisted by Collingwood.

== Personal life ==
Gourlay grew up supporting Carlton, a club who have a long lasting rivalry with Collingwood, the club that drafted her.

== Statistics ==
Statistics are correct the end of the 2020 season.

Legend
G	Goals	K	Kicks	D	Disposals	T	Tackles
B	Behinds	H	Handballs	M	Marks

Season	Team	No.	Games	Totals							Averages (per game)						
Season	Team	No.	Games	G	B	K	H	D	M	T	G	B	K	H	D	M	T
2019	Collingwood	32	5	0	0	23	1	24	9	6	0.0	0.0	4.6	0.2	4.8	1.8	1.2
2020	Collingwood	32	0	—	—	—	—	—	—	—	—	—	—	—	—	—	—
Career			5	0	0	23	1	24	9	6	0.0	0.0	4.6	0.2	4.8	1.8	1.2
