= Trey Ruscoe =

Australian rules football player

Personal information
- Full name: Trey Ruscoe
- Born: 3 November 2001 (age 25)
- Original teams: East Fremantle Football Club, (WAFL)
- Draft: No. 55, 2019 AFL draft, Collingwood
- Height: 193 cm (6 ft 4 in)
- Weight: 92 kg (203 lb)
- Position: Defender

Playing career^{1}
Years	Club	Games (Goals)
2020–2023	Collingwood	18 (7)
- ^{1} Playing statistics correct to the end of the 2023 season.

Trey Ruscoe (born 3 November 2001) is a former professional Australian rules footballer who played for the Collingwood Football Club in the Australian Football League (AFL).

== AFL career ==
Ruscoe was selected at pick 55 in the 2019 AFL draft by the Collingwood Football Club and made his debut in Round 10 against the Sydney Swans

In October 2023, it was announced by Ruscoe on his Instagram account that he had been delisted by Collingwood, days after they had won the 2023 AFL Grand Final.

== Statistics ==
Updated to the end of the 2023 season.

Legend
G	Goals	K	Kicks	D	Disposals	T	Tackles
B	Behinds	H	Handballs	M	Marks

Season	Team	No.	Games	Totals							Averages (per game)						
Season	Team	No.	Games	G	B	K	H	D	M	T	G	B	K	H	D	M	T
2020 (Note: The 2020 season was played with 17 home-and-away matches per team (down from 22) and 16-minute quarters with time on (down from 20-minute quarters with time on) due to the impact of the COVID-19 pandemic.)	Collingwood	39	4	5	4	17	6	23	5	3	1.3	1.0	4.3	1.5	5.8	1.3	0.8
2021	Collingwood	21	9	2	0	73	33	106	27	15	0.2	0.0	8.1	3.7	11.8	3.0	1.7
2022	Collingwood	21	4	0	1	24	9	33	10	5	0.0	0.3	6.0	2.3	8.3	2.5	1.3
2023	Collingwood	21	1	0	0	9	2	11	7	2	0.0	0.0	9.0	2.0	11.0	7.0	2.0
Career			18	7	5	123	50	173	49	25	0.4	0.3	6.8	2.8	9.6	2.7	1.4
