= Mikala Cann =

Australian rules footballer

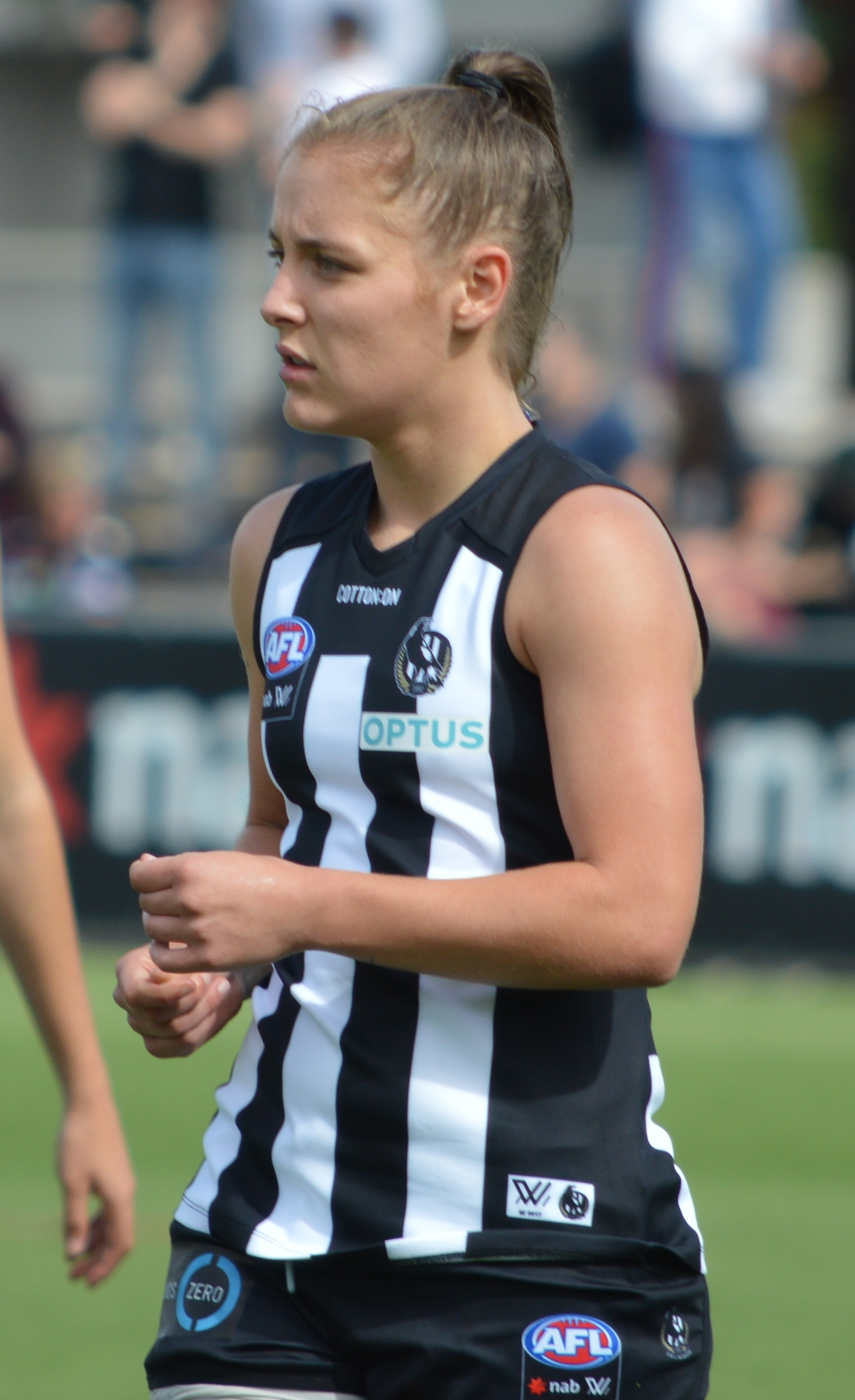
- Cann with Collingwood in February 2019

Personal information
- Born: 4 November 2000 (age 25)
- Original teams: Eastern Ranges (TAC Cup Girls); Hawthorn (VFLW)
- Draft: No. 13, 2018 AFLW draft
- Debut: Round 1, 2019, Collingwood vs. Geelong, at GMHBA Stadium
- Height: 173 cm (5 ft 8 in)
- Position: Midfielder

Club information
- Current club: Western Bulldogs

Playing career^{1}
Years	Club	Games (Goals)
2019–2025	Collingwood	76 (15)
2026–	Western Bulldogs	0 (0)
Total		76 (15)
- ^{1} Playing statistics correct to the end of the 2025 season.

Career highlights
- 22under22 team: 2021

Mikala Cann (born 4 November 2000) is an Australian rules footballer playing for the Western Bulldogs in the AFL Women's (AFLW). She has previously played for Collingwood.

== Junior career ==
Cann originally played basketball and aspired to a career in the sport at an American college. Her local football club was Blackburn. In 2018, she first took up competitive football in the TAC Cup Girls with the Eastern Ranges. Playing all nine matches, Cann was named in the league's team of the year. She also represented Vic Metro in the 2018 AFL Women's Under 18 Championships. In the second half of 2018, Cann played six matches for Hawthorn in the VFL Women's, including their premiership victory against Geelong. She recorded nine tackles, 14 disposals and 10 contested possessions. At 17, Cann was the youngest member of the side. She wore number 45.

== AFLW career ==
Cann was drafted by Collingwood with pick 13 in the 2018 AFLW draft, their third selection. Coach Wayne Siekman commented, "Mikayla loves the contest ball and hates to get beaten. ... She tackles extremely well and for a player who is only in her first year of footy, the future is exciting."

In December 2025, Cann joined Western Bulldogs in a three-way trade including Gold Coast.

== Personal life ==
Cann is currently studying a Bachelor of Exercise and Sport Science at Deakin University.

== Statistics ==
Statistics are correct the end of the 2025 season.

Legend
G	Goals	K	Kicks	D	Disposals	T	Tackles
B	Behinds	H	Handballs	M	Marks

Season	Team	No.	Games	Totals							Averages (per game)							Votes
Season	Team	No.	Games	G	B	K	H	D	M	T	G	B	K	H	D	M	T	Votes
2019	Collingwood	25	4	0	2	10	8	18	2	26	0.0	0.5	2.5	2.0	4.5	0.5	6.5	0
2020	Collingwood	25	7	1	1	26	43	69	14	24	0.1	0.1	3.7	6.1	9.9	2.0	3.4	0
2021	Collingwood	25	11	2	2	50	82	132	25	38	0.2	0.2	4.5	7.5	12.0	2.3	3.5	0
2022 (S6)	Collingwood	25	11	3	1	67	105	172	22	45	0.3	0.1	6.1	9.5	15.6	2.0	4.1	0
2022 (S7)	Collingwood	25	11	2	4	75	118	193	20	62	0.2	0.4	6.8	10.7	17.5	1.8	5.6	7
2023	Collingwood	25	10	3	1	62	118	180	17	71	0.3	0.1	6.2	11.8	18.0	1.7	7.1	0
2024	Collingwood	25	10	2	5	52	102	154	15	65	0.2	0.5	5.2	10.2	15.4	1.5	6.5	0
2025	Collingwood	25	12	2	2	71	107	178	19	77	0.2	0.2	5.9	8.9	14.8	1.6	6.4	0
Career			76	15	18	413	683	1096	134	408	0.2	0.2	5.4	9.0	14.4	1.8	5.4	7
