= Atu Bosenavulagi =

Australian rules footballer (born 2000)

Personal information
- Full name: Atunaisa Bosenavulagi
- Nickname: R2
- Born: 17 September 2000 (age 26); Sawani, Naitasiri, Fiji
- Original team: Oakleigh Chargers
- Draft: No. 77, 2018 AFL draft, Collingwood
- Debut: 10 July 2020, Collingwood vs. Hawthorn, at GIANTS Stadium
- Height: 180 cm (5 ft 11 in)
- Weight: 82 kg (181 lb)
- Position: Defender / Forward

Playing career^{1}
| Years | Club | Games (Goals) |
| 2019–2020 | Collingwood | 3 (0) |
| 2021–2022 | North Melbourne | 17 (1) |
| Total | | 20 (1) |
- ^{1} Playing statistics correct to the end of the 2022 season.

Atunaisa Bosenavulagi (born 17 September 2000) is a former Australian rules footballer who played for the North Melbourne Football Club in the Australian Football League (AFL), having previously played for the Collingwood Football Club.

== Early football ==
Bosenavulagi played junior football for the Boroondara Hawks in the Yarra Junior Football League, helping them win the premiership in 2017. Bosenavulagi also played under-18s football for the Oakleigh Chargers in the TAC Cup, before getting selected by Collingwood. In his junior years, Bosenavulagi represented Australia as a junior representative in rugby sevens, as well as playing Australian rules football. He played for the Oakleigh Chargers 9 games in 2017, while juggling both codes, seeing him often play football on Saturday and rugby on Sunday. In 2018, he played all 18 games for the Oakleigh Chargers, kicking 15 goals, and helping lead them to the Grand Final, which they lost to the Dandenong Stingrays by four points.

== AFL career ==
Bosenavulagi was part of Collingwood's Next Generation Academy. The club drafted him to their Australian Football League (AFL) squad with the 77th draft pick in the 2018 AFL draft. He debuted for Collingwood in Round 6 of the 2020 AFL season, in the club's 32-point victory over Hawthorn, collecting 16 disposals, taking four marks, and laying one tackle. Due to the COVID-19 pandemic in Australia, his debut was in a game with no fans, meaning his mother, Meri, couldn't attend the game, making it only the third game of his that she missed.

At the conclusion of the 2020 AFL season, Bosenavulagi was traded to North Melbourne along with North Melbourne teammate Jaidyn Stephenson.

== Personal life ==
Bosenavulagi was born in Fiji in the Sawani village in the Naitasiri Province, and has Fijian heritage. He is the great-nephew of Collingwood's cheer squad leader, Joffa Corfe, who is married to Bosnavulagi's grandma's sister, but Bosenavulagi refers to Corfe as 'grandpa'. Despite Corfe's efforts, Bosenavulagi grew up supporting the Western Bulldogs. Bosenavulagi's father, Atu, played rugby in Fiji and continued when the family moved to Australia in 2003. Bosenvulagi was educated at Christian Brothers College in Melbourne.

== Statistics ==
Statistics are correct to the end of the 2020 season

Legend
| G | Goals | K | Kicks | D | Disposals | T | Tackles |
| B | Behinds | H | Handballs | M | Marks |

| Season | Team | No. | Games | Totals | | | | | | | Averages (per game) | | | | | | |
| Season | Team | No. | Games | G | B | K | H | D | M | T | G | B | K | H | D | M | T |
|---|---|---|---|---|---|---|---|---|---|---|---|---|---|---|---|---|---|
| 2019 | Collingwood | 40 | 0 | — | — | — | — | — | — | — | — | — | — | — | — | — | — |
| 2020 | Collingwood | 40 | 3 | 0 | 0 | 9 | 12 | 21 | 6 | 5 | 0.0 | 0.0 | 3.0 | 4.0 | 7.0 | 2.0 | 1.7 |
| Career | | | 3 | 0 | 0 | 9 | 12 | 21 | 6 | 5 | 0.0 | 0.0 | 3.0 | 4.0 | 7.0 | 2.0 | 1.7 |
