= John Noble (footballer) =

Australian rules footballer (born 1997)

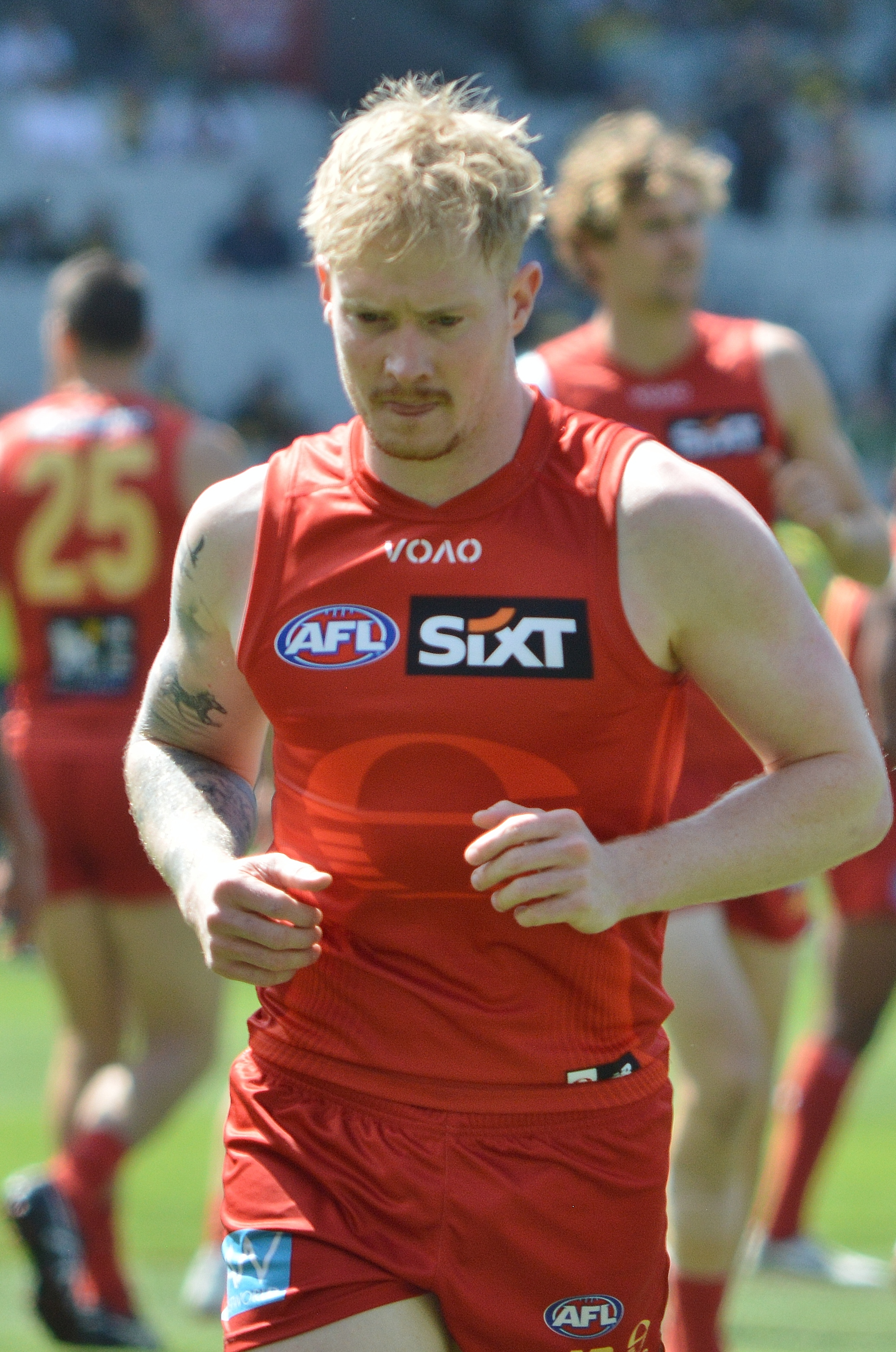
- Noble playing for Gold Coast in March 2026

Personal information
- Born: 25 March 1997 (age 29)
- Original team: West Adelaide (SANFL)
- Draft: No. 14, 2019 mid-season draft
- Debut: Round 17, 2019, Collingwood vs. West Coast, at Optus Stadium
- Height: 180 cm (5 ft 11 in)
- Weight: 72 kg (159 lb)
- Position: Defender

Club information
- Current club: Gold Coast
- Number: 2

Playing career^{1}
Years	Club	Games (Goals)
2019–2024	Collingwood	112 (8)
2025–	Gold Coast	46 (10)
Total		156 (18)
- ^{1} Playing statistics correct to the end of round 22, 2026.

John Noble (born 25 March 1997) is an Australian rules footballer playing for Gold Coast in the Australian Football League (AFL). Playing as a half-back or winger, he was selected in the 2019 mid-season draft after spending several years in the South Australian National Football League (SANFL). He made his AFL debut late in the 2019 season.

== SANFL career ==
Noble, originally from Adelaide, was born prematurely as an identical twin. As a result, he was required to take medication during childhood which delayed his physical development. He began playing for West Adelaide in the SANFL from 2016, playing 43 games and kicking 24 goals during his time at the club. Noble represented his league in a 2019 match against a West Australian Football League (WAFL) representative side, laying four tackles and amassing 24 disposals.

== AFL career ==
Noble was recruited by Collingwood as a rookie with pick 14 in the 2019 mid-season draft, replacing Lynden Dunn after he was moved to the long-term injury list. The club's recruiting manager, Derek Hine, cited Noble's combination of speed and endurance, together with his performance in the state-league representative match as the reasons he was selected. Ben Hopkins, West Adelaide's chief executive, congratulated Noble on his selection but pointed out the club's disadvantage and lack of compensation for losing him to the AFL.

Noble initially wore guernsey number #49 at Collingwood. He began playing in the club's reserves side in the Victorian Football League (VFL), and after three matches was called up to the AFL team in a round 17 match against West Coast. Noble accumulated 17 possessions on debut but injured his calf. He returned in the last two rounds of the home-and-away season and went on to play in Collingwood's two finals. Ahead of the 2020 season he re-signed with Collingwood until the end of 2021, and inherited guernsey number #9 from Sam Murray, who had been delisted.

Noble was elevated from the rookie list to a senior spot during the 2022 AFL draft. Noble played every game of Collingwood's first-place home-and-away season in 2023, amassing a streak of 83 games, which was the highest of any mid-season draft pick at the time. However, Noble was omitted for Collingwood's qualifying final against Melbourne, and was not selected in the winning team of the 2023 Grand Final. Noble made his return to the side in 2024, playing a further 20 games, including his 100th game against Adelaide in round 10. Due to family reasons, Noble requested a trade to Gold Coast at the conclusion of the season, despite being contracted until the end of 2026. The trade was completed on 15 October.

== Family ==
Noble is the son of David Noble, a former Fitzroy player and a premiership player with North Hobart Football Club in the Tasmanian Football League, who later became a professional sports administrator with experience at Adelaide and the Brisbane Lions. Noble was able to use his father's connections, knowledge and advice to assist him as a prospective draftee. David was appointed as the senior coach of North Melbourne in November 2020, and would be sacked midway through the 2022 season after a series of poor results. David returned to Queensland in late 2022 and based himself on the Gold Coast where he accepted a CEO role at Dick Johnson Racing, a move that would later contribute to John's request to join the Gold Coast Suns in 2024.

== Statistics ==
Updated to the end of round 22, 2026.

Legend
G	Goals	K	Kicks	D	Disposals	T	Tackles
B	Behinds	H	Handballs	M	Marks

Season	Team	No.	Games	Totals							Averages (per game)							Votes
Season	Team	No.	Games	G	B	K	H	D	M	T	G	B	K	H	D	M	T	Votes
2019	Collingwood	49	5	0	1	55	38	93	20	11	0.0	0.2	11.0	7.6	18.6	4.0	2.2	0
2020 (Note: The 2020 season was played with 17 home-and-away matches per team (down from 22) and 16-minute quarters with time on (down from 20-minute quarters with time on) due to the impact of the COVID-19 pandemic.)	Collingwood	9	17	2	0	161	116	277	55	29	0.1	0.0	9.5	6.8	16.3	3.2	1.7	1
2021	Collingwood	9	22	2	0	260	149	409	114	57	0.1	0.0	11.8	6.8	18.6	5.2	2.6	0
2022	Collingwood	9	25	0	0	291	149	440	116	66	0.0	0.0	11.6	6.0	17.6	4.6	2.6	0
2023	Collingwood	9	23	3	1	322	148	470	123	56	0.1	0.0	14.0	6.4	20.4	5.3	2.4	1
2024	Collingwood	9	20	1	1	235	143	378	93	54	0.1	0.1	11.8	7.2	18.9	4.7	2.7	3
2025	Gold Coast	2	25	3	3	436	196	632	121	56	0.1	0.1	17.4	7.8	25.3	4.8	2.2	4
2026	Gold Coast	2	21	7	3	363	179	542	146	42	0.3	0.1	17.3	8.5	25.8	7.0	2.0	0
Career			158	18	9	2123	1118	3241	788	371	0.1	0.1	13.4	7.1	20.5	5.0	2.3	9
