= Anton Tohill =

Australian rules football player

Personal information
- Full name: Anton Tohill
- Born: 14 December 1999 (age 26); Swatragh, Northern Ireland
- Original team: Swatragh (club)/Derry (county team)
- Draft: 2019 rookie draft category B selection
- Debut: Round 19, 2021, Collingwood vs. Port Adelaide, at Marvel Stadium
- Height: 200 cm (6 ft 7 in)
- Weight: 91 kg (201 lb)
- Position: Defender

Playing career
| Years | Club | Games (Goals) |
| 2019–2021 | Collingwood | 1 (0) |

Anton Tohill (born 14 December 1999) is a Gaelic footballer and former Australian rules football player. He plays for the Swatragh club, the Derry county team and, formerly, for the Collingwood Football Club in the Australian Football League (AFL).

== AFL career ==
In December 2017, Tohill participated in a European AFL Combine in Dublin and the following month flew to an AFL Academy camp in Florida. Later in the year he joined Collingwood as a Category B rookie after finishing 12th in kicking at the AFL Draft Combine, signing a two-year contract. In the 2019 AFL season, he suffered a concussion, a quad injury, and a torn hip rotator, which limited his playing time. He managed to play 12 games in the Victorian Football League (VFL), deployed as a key forward and playing in the ruck. His preparation for the 2020 AFL season was limited due to getting injured after falling on a treadmill and the season was reduced due to the COVID-19 pandemic in Australia, with the 2020 VFL season being cancelled. In December 2020, at the end of his initial contract, he signed a one-year extension. Tohill impressed in the 2021 VFL season, playing as a defender. He made his debut at Marvel Stadium against Port Adelaide in the club's round 19 match of the 2021 AFL season, which Collingwood lost by 28 points. In August 2021, Tohill retired from Australian rules football after turning down a one-year contract extension and returned to Northern Ireland to study medicine at Queen's University Belfast.

== GAA career ==
Tohill made his senior inter-county debut for Derry on 7 January 2022 as a late substitute for Shea Downey in Derry's opening game of the 2022 Dr McKenna Cup against Monaghan. He made another substitute appearance against Fermanagh in Derry's next game in the competition. Derry qualified for the semi-final, losing to Donegal, though Tohill scored a point in that game.

Tohill was still involved when Derry won the 2022 Ulster Senior Football Championship later that year.

Tohill's athleticism was credited with helping his club Swatragh defeat Bellaghy in the last 16 of the 2022 Derry Senior Football Championship in September that year. Swatragh qualified for a quarter-final against Slaughneil, scheduled for 1 October. Slaughtneil won and advanced to the semi-final, knocking out Swatragh.

== Personal life ==
Tohill was born in Swatragh in Northern Ireland. His father, Anthony, played Gaelic football and international rules football, as well as playing Australian rules football with Melbourne. One of the players Anthony had played against was Collingwood's interim coach Robert Harvey.

== Statistics ==
Statistics are correct to the end of the 2021 season

Legend
| G | Goals | K | Kicks | D | Disposals | T | Tackles |
| B | Behinds | H | Handballs | M | Marks |

| Season | Team | No. | Games | Totals | | | | | | | Averages (per game) | | | | | | |
| Season | Team | No. | Games | G | B | K | H | D | M | T | G | B | K | H | D | M | T |
|---|---|---|---|---|---|---|---|---|---|---|---|---|---|---|---|---|---|
| 2019 | Collingwood | 43 | 0 | — | — | — | — | — | — | — | — | — | — | — | — | — | — |
| 2020 (Note: The 2020 season was played with 17 home-and-away matches per team (down from 22) and 16-minute quarters with time on (down from 20-minute quarters with time on) due to the impact of the COVID-19 pandemic.) | Collingwood | 43 | 0 | — | — | — | — | — | — | — | — | — | — | — | — | — | — |
| 2021 | Collingwood | 43 | 1 | 0 | 0 | 4 | 5 | 9 | 3 | 0 | 0.0 | 0.0 | 4.0 | 5.0 | 9.0 | 3.0 | 0.0 |
| Career | | | 1 | 0 | 0 | 4 | 5 | 9 | 3 | 0 | 0.0 | 0.0 | 4.0 | 5.0 | 9.0 | 3.0 | 0.0 |
