= Morwell Recreation Reserve =

Multi purpose sport complex located in Morwell, Australia

- Interactive map of Morwell Recreation Reserve
- Location: Travers Street, Morwell, Victoria
- Coordinates: 38°14′27″S 146°23′24″E
- Owner: Latrobe City Council
- Capacity: 10,000
- Surface: Grass
- Record attendance: 12,000

Tenants
- Australian Rules Football; Gippsland Power Football Club (NAB); Morwell Football Club (GFL); Collingwood Football Club (VFL) (2014); Collingwood Football Club (AFLW) (2019, 2020); Cricket; Morwell Cricket Club (LVDCL); Soccer; Falcons 2000 (LVSL) (1974–81, 2025–26)

Morwell Recreation Reserve is a multi purpose sport complex located in Morwell, Victoria, Australia. It is the home ground of the Gippsland Power Football Club NAB League team, the Morwell Football Club in the Gippsland Football League, and the Morwell Cricket Club in the Latrobe Valley & District Cricket League.

The stadium, with a maximum capacity of 10,000, has also hosted a series of AFL pre-season matches. In 2014, the stadium hosted a Victorian Football League game between the Collingwood and Richmond reserves. In 2019, the stadium hosted its first regular season AFL Women's game, with Collingwood hosting the Greater Western Sydney in Round 4.

An upgrade to the site by the Latrobe City Council commenced in 2018, and saw the installation of new netball courts, lighting towers, a shared pavilion, and a synthetic playing surface for Australian rules football, soccer and cricket. The second stage of the upgrade was completed in January 2019.

Falcons 2000 Soccer Club - who spent eight years at the adjoined Keegan Street Reserve (part of the Morwell Recreation Reserve's greater footprint) between 1974 and 1981 - moved to play on synthetic field at the Morwell Recreation Reserve whilst the major capital works at the Gippsland Sports and Entertainment Park took place in 2025 and 2026.

== Attendance records ==
No.	Date	Teams	Sport	Competition	Crowd
1	26 February 2005	Essendon v. Richmond	Australian rules football	AFL (preseason)	12,000
2	11 March 2019	Collingwood v. Carlton	Australian rules football	AFL (preseason)	6,386
3	7 March 2015	Essendon v. St Kilda	Australian rules football	AFL (preseason)	5,542
4	24 February 2019	Collingwood v. Greater Western Sydney	Australian rules football	AFLW	1,743
5	28 February 2004	Hawthorn v. North Melbourne	Australian rules football	AFL (preseason)	1,500
