= Rupert Wills =

Australian rules footballer (born 1993)

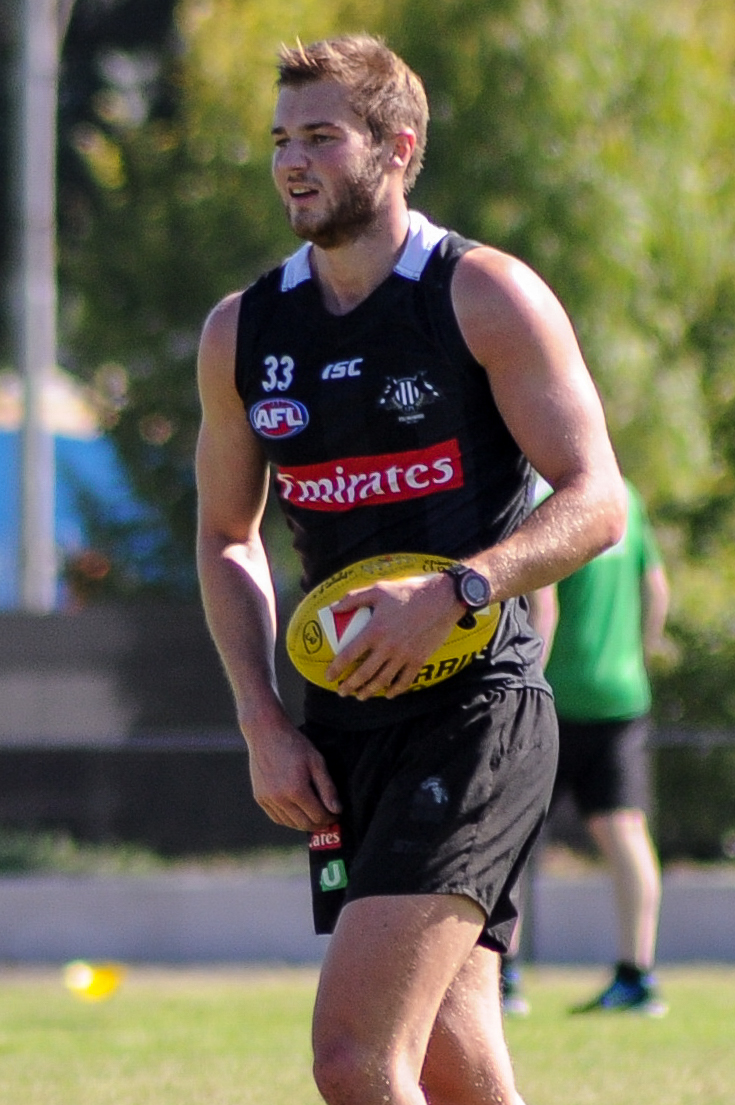
- Wills with Collingwood in March 2017

Personal information
- Full name: Rupert Wills
- Born: 20 May 1993 (age 33); New Zealand
- Original team: Collingwood (VFL)
- Draft: No. 63, 2015 national draft
- Debut: Round 19, 2016, Collingwood vs. West Coast, at MCG
- Height: 192 cm (6 ft 4 in)
- Weight: 89 kg (196 lb)
- Position: Midfielder

Playing career^{1}
Years	Club	Games (Goals)
2016–2020	Collingwood	23 (1)
- ^{1} Playing statistics correct to the end of the 2020 season.

Rupert Wills (born 20 May 1993) is an Australian rules footballer who played for the Collingwood Football Club in the Australian Football League (AFL).

== Early life and state football ==
Wills was born in New Zealand, but moved to Australia with his family when he was seven. He was educated at Scotch College in Melbourne, playing football with the third team in Year 11 and then alternating between the second and first team in Year 12. After graduating, he travelled to London to work at Harrow College. A year later, upon his return from England, Wills joined Old Scotch in the Victorian Amateur Football Association (VAFA) in 2013. In 2013, he played 5 senior games and 15 reserves games, and in 2014 played 11 senior games and a single reserve game, totalling 32 games played for the club. He was named among the best in six of his senior games in 2014. In 2015, Collingwood's Victorian Football League (VFL) manager, Luke Gatti, invited Wills to trial for their top-up squad. He played six senior games for them before being drafted to their Australian Football League (AFL) side. A series of injuries, including a hamstring injury, sidelined him and prevented him from making any more appearances that season.

== AFL career ==
Wills was drafted by the Collingwood Football Club with their third selection and sixty-third overall in the 2015 national draft. He made his debut in a nineteen-point victory against West Coast in the 19th round of the 2016 season at the Melbourne Cricket Ground, laying 11 tackles. These 11 tackles, at the time put Rupert as the VFL/AFL record-holder for most tackles laid in a game on debut. After his debut, he played another four games, totalling five games played in his debut season, in which he averaged 17 disposals and 8.6 tackles per game. In the 2017 season, Wills made only one senior appearance, after suffering a quad muscle injury in the pre-season and a calf muscle injury in April. Despite the lack of games, Wills signed a two-year contract extension at the end of the season. In the 2018 season, Wills didn't feature at all at the senior level. In the 2019 season, Wills made only three appearances in the first half of the season, before resurging with the last four games of the regular season, which were among the best games of his career, averaging 18.8 disposals, 9 contested possessions, and 6.8 tackles. At the end of the season, he signed a one-year contract extension. In November 2020, Wills was delisted by Collingwood.

== Personal life ==
Wills is currently studying a Bachelor of Commerce/Bachelor of Laws at Deakin University.

== Statistics ==
Statistics are correct to the end of the 2020 season

Legend
G	Goals	K	Kicks	D	Disposals	T	Tackles
B	Behinds	H	Handballs	M	Marks

Season	Team	No.	Games	Totals							Averages (per game)						
Season	Team	No.	Games	G	B	K	H	D	M	T	G	B	K	H	D	M	T
2016	Collingwood	33	5	1	1	37	51	88	14	43	0.2	0.2	7.4	10.2	17.6	2.8	8.6
2017	Collingwood	33	1	0	1	7	8	15	2	5	0	1.0	7.0	8.0	15.0	2.0	5.0
2018	Collingwood	33	0	—	—	—	—	—	—	—	—	—	—	—	—	—	—
2019	Collingwood	33	9	0	1	48	93	141	23	67	0	0.1	5.3	10.3	15.7	2.6	7.4
2020	Collingwood	33	8	0	0	43	82	125	10	38	0	0	5.4	10.3	15.6	1.3	4.8
Career			23	1	3	135	234	369	49	153	0.04	0.1	5.9	10.2	16.0	2.1	6.7
