= Emma Grant =

Australian rules footballer (born 1989)

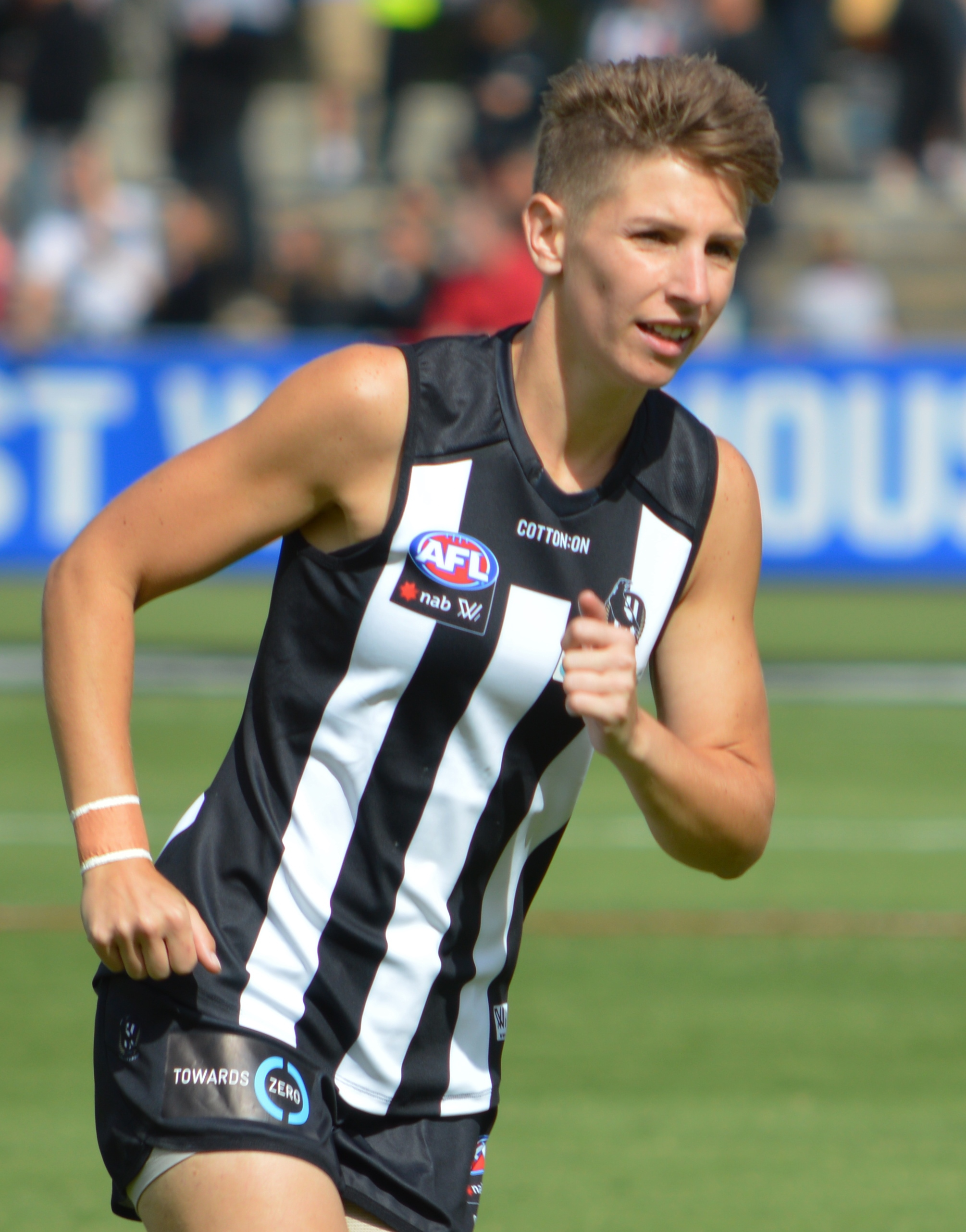
- Grant playing for Collingwood in February 2019

Personal information
- Full name: Emma Grant
- Born: 22 July 1989 (age 37); Gisborne, Victoria
- Original team: Bendigo (VWFL)
- Draft: No. 91, 2016 national draft
- Debut: Round 1, 2017, Collingwood vs. Carlton, at IKON Park
- Height: 166 cm (5 ft 5 in)
- Position: Utility

Playing career
Years	Club	Games (Goals)
2017–2020	Collingwood	20 (2)

Emma Grant (born 22 July 1989) is a retired Australian rules footballer who played for Collingwood in the AFL Women's (AFLW).

== Early life and state football ==
Grant grew up in Gisborne and played her junior football at Gisborne from under-9s to under-12s, being the first girl to play at the club. At the age of 12 she had to stop playing football due to league rules and switched to netball. After moving to Bendigo for her university studies, she joined VWFL club Bendigo Thunder in 2011 as a foundation player. She captained them in the 2016 season, when they were unbeaten until losing the premier division grand final to Deer Park, and won the best and fairest award by 10 votes. During the season she also represented Melbourne in two exhibition matches.

During the off-season between the 2017 and 2018 AFLW seasons, Grant played for Diamond Creek in the VFLW, helping them to the grand final, but they lost the premiership match to Darebin Falcons.

== AFL Women's career ==
After being drafted by Collingwood, Grant impressed in a practice match 10 point win over the Western Bulldogs, playing each quarter in a different position. She made her debut in round 1, 2017, in the inaugural AFLW match at IKON Park against Carlton, in which she left the field in the second quarter after Brianna Davey's arm hit her in a tackle. She did not return to the field after failing a concussion test.

After playing all 7 matches in the inaugural season and placing 4th in the best and fairest, Collingwood re-signed Grant for the 2018 season during the trade period in May 2017.

Collingwood re-signed Grant for the 2019 season during the trade period in June 2018.

In March 2020, following the 2020 season in which she didn't play due to a head concussion she got in pre-season, Grant announced her retirement.

== Personal life ==
Apart from her sports career, Grant worked as a PE and Grade 1-2 teacher at Bendigo Violet Street Primary School and then at Moonee Ponds Primary School. Currently Grant is teaching PE at Bendigo South East College.

In March 2023, Grant initiated a civil lawsuit in the County Court of Victoria against the Collingwood Football Club due to concussion-related injuries that she suffered during her playing career which resulted in her early retirement.

== Statistics ==
Statistics are correct to the end of the 2020 season.

Legend
G	Goals	K	Kicks	D	Disposals	T	Tackles
B	Behinds	H	Handballs	M	Marks

Season	Team	No.	Games	Totals							Averages (per game)						
Season	Team	No.	Games	G	B	K	H	D	M	T	G	B	K	H	D	M	T
2017	Collingwood	5	7	1	0	35	10	45	17	23	0.1	0.0	5.0	1.4	6.4	2.4	3.3
2018	Collingwood	5	7	0	0	43	19	62	17	18	0.0	0.0	6.1	2.7	8.9	2.4	2.6
2019	Collingwood	5	6	1	0	25	17	42	9	12	0.2	0.0	4.2	2.8	7.0	1.5	2.0
2020	Collingwood	5	0	—	—	—	—	—	—	—	—	—	—	—	—	—	—
Career			20	2	0	103	46	149	43	53	0.1	0.0	5.2	2.3	7.5	2.2	2.7
