= Sophie Casey =

Australian rules footballer

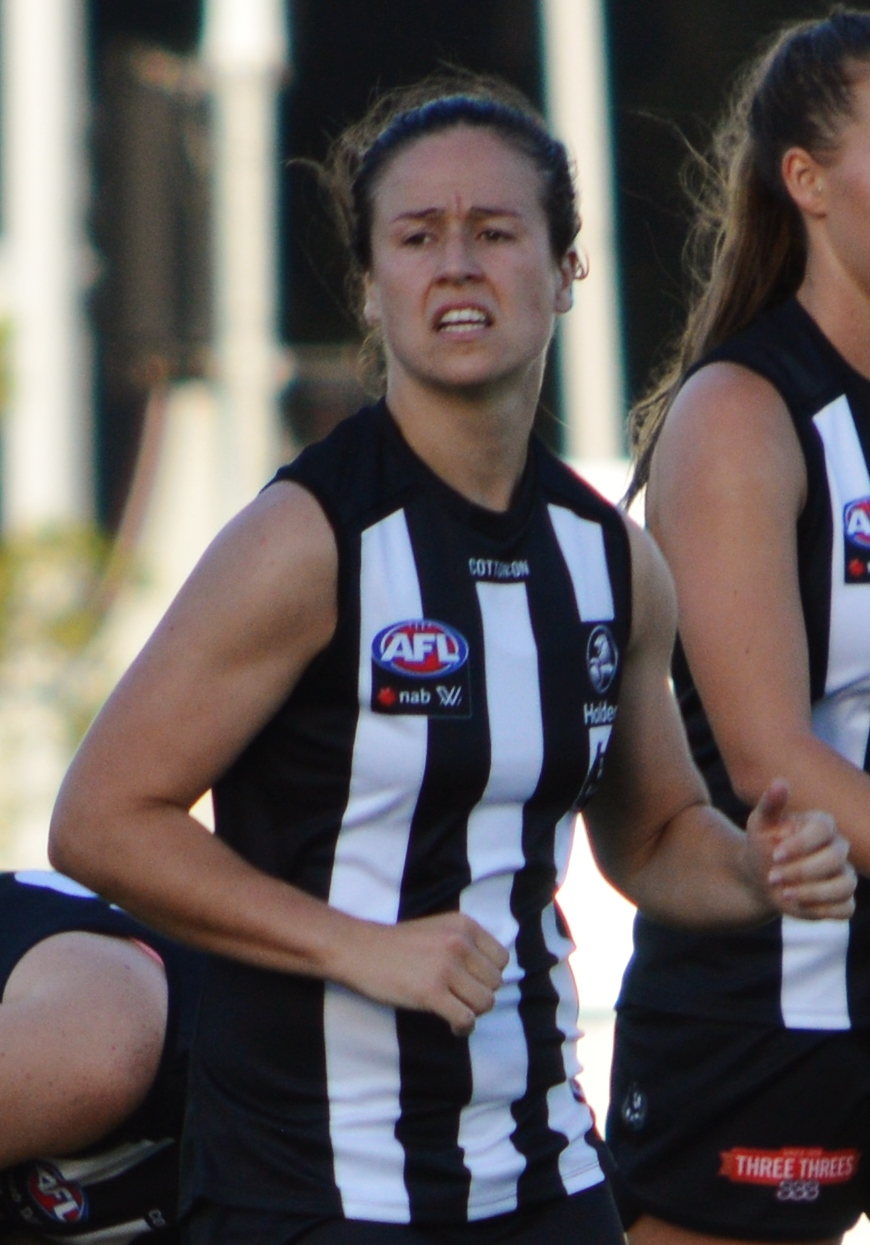
- Sophie Casey during the 2022 AFLW season, representing Collingwood

Personal information
- Full name: Sophie Casey
- Born: 22 October 1991 (age 35); Holbrook, New South Wales
- Original team: Eastern Devils (VFLW)
- Draft: 2016 free agent: Collingwood
- Debut: Round 1, 2017, Collingwood vs. Carlton, at IKON Park
- Height: 165 cm (5 ft 5 in)
- Position: Defender

Playing career^{1}
Years	Club	Games (Goals)
2017–2023	Collingwood	63 (2)
- ^{1} Playing statistics correct to the end of 2023.

Sophie Casey (born 22 October 1991) is a former Australian rules footballer who played for the Collingwood Football Club in the AFL Women's (AFLW). Casey was one of the inaugural players in the AFLW competition and made her debut in the league’s historic first match in February 2017 at IKON Park.

== Early life and state football ==
Sophie Casey was born in Holbrook, New South Wales, where she was introduced to Australian rules football through the Auskick program. She played for three years with the Riverina Lions in the Canberra League while attending university in Wagga Wagga.

Casey later joined the VFLW club, Eastern Devils. In 2014 and 2015, she was selected for the AFLW Academy, a program designed to identify and develop elite female football talent.

Despite her strong performances in the VFLW and her development through the AFLW Academy, Casey was overlooked in the 2016 AFL Women's draft. However, her talent and potential did not go unnoticed, and she was signed by the Collingwood Football Club as a free agent ahead of the AFL Women's inaugural season.

== AFL Women's Career ==
Casey made her AFLW debut in February 2017 during the league’s first-ever match at IKON Park against Carlton, a historic moment for Australian football. Across her seven-season career with Collingwood, Casey played 63 games, becoming a key figure in the club’s defence. She also made an offensive impact, kicking her first career goal in a match against Greater Western Sydney during the 2020 AFLW season.

=== Citations and Challenges ===
During her career, Casey’s aggressive playing style occasionally led to challenges. She was cited by the AFLW Tribunal on multiple occasions, reflecting her physical approach to the game. While these moments were part of her career, they also highlighted her uncompromising commitment to winning contests and protecting her teammates.

In December 2023, Collingwood announced that Casey would not be offered a contract for the 2024 AFLW season.

== Statistics ==
Statistics are correct to the end of the 2023 season.

Legend
G	Goals	K	Kicks	D	Disposals	T	Tackles
B	Behinds	H	Handballs	M	Marks

Season	Team	No.	Games	Totals							Averages (per game)						
Season	Team	No.	Games	G	B	K	H	D	M	T	G	B	K	H	D	M	T
2017	Collingwood	22	5	1	0	7	14	21	7	13	0.2	0.0	1.4	2.8	4.2	1.4	2.6
2018	Collingwood	22	3	0	0	9	5	14	0	8	0.0	0.0	3.0	1.7	4.7	0.0	2.7
2019	Collingwood	22	7	0	0	20	8	28	2	15	0.0	0.0	2.9	1.1	4.0	0.3	2.1
2020	Collingwood	22	7	1	0	22	21	43	7	12	0.1	0.0	3.1	3.0	6.1	1.0	1.7
2021	Collingwood	22	10	0	0	23	31	54	9	17	0.0	0.0	2.3	3.1	5.4	0.9	1.7
2022 (S6)	Collingwood	22	10	0	0	40	28	68	11	17	0.0	0.0	4.0	2.8	6.8	1.1	1.7
2022 (S7)	Collingwood	22	11	0	0	50	32	82	13	19	0.0	0.0	4.5	2.9	7.5	1.2	1.7
2023	Collingwood	22	10	0	0	34	20	54	8	23	0.0	0.0	3.4	2.0	5.4	0.8	2.3
Career			63	2	0	205	159	364	57	124	0.03	0.0	3.3	2.5	5.8	0.9	2.0
