= Nicole Hildebrand =

Australian rules footballer (born 1993)

Personal information
- Full name: Nicole Hildebrand
- Born: 22 November 1993 (age 32); Victoria
- Original team: Melbourne University (VWFL)
- Draft: No. 18, 2016 AFL Women's draft
- Debut: Round 1, 2017, Brisbane vs. Melbourne, at Casey Fields
- Height: 165 cm (5 ft 5 in)
- Position: Defender

Playing career^{1}
| Years | Club | Games (Goals) |
| 2017–2018 | Brisbane | 13 (0) |
| 2019 | Collingwood | 2 (0) |
| Total | | 15 (0) |
- ^{1} Playing statistics correct to the end of the 2019 season.

Nicole Hildebrand (born 22 November 1993) is an Australian rules footballer who last played for Collingwood in the AFL Women's.

== Early life ==
Hildebrand was born in 1993 in Victoria. She was playing for Melbourne University when she was drafted.

== AFLW career ==
=== Brisbane ===
Hildebrand was recruited by Brisbane with the number 18 pick in the 2016 AFL Women's draft. She made her debut in the Lions' inaugural game against Melbourne at Casey Fields on 5 February 2017.

Brisbane signed Hildebrand for the 2018 season during the trade period in May 2017.

=== Collingwood ===
On 28 May 2018, Hildebrand was traded to Collingwood for pick 40, which was on-traded to Carlton for Lauren Arnell. In April 2019, she was delisted by Collingwood.

== Statistics ==
Statistics are correct to the end of the 2019 season.

Legend
| G | Goals | K | Kicks | D | Disposals | T | Tackles |
| B | Behinds | H | Handballs | M | Marks |

| Season | Team | No. | Games | Totals | | | | | | | Averages (per game) | | | | | | |
| Season | Team | No. | Games | G | B | K | H | D | M | T | G | B | K | H | D | M | T |
|---|---|---|---|---|---|---|---|---|---|---|---|---|---|---|---|---|---|
| 2017 | Brisbane | 22 | 8 | 0 | 0 | 47 | 7 | 54 | 18 | 10 | 0.0 | 0.0 | 5.9 | 0.9 | 6.8 | 2.3 | 1.3 |
| 2018 | Brisbane | 22 | 5 | 0 | 0 | 22 | 10 | 32 | 8 | 6 | 0.0 | 0.0 | 4.4 | 2.0 | 6.4 | 1.6 | 1.2 |
| 2019 | Collingwood | 3 | 2 | 0 | 0 | 10 | 3 | 13 | 3 | 5 | 0.0 | 0.0 | 5.0 | 1.5 | 6.5 | 1.5 | 2.5 |
| Career | | | 15 | 0 | 0 | 79 | 20 | 99 | 29 | 21 | 0.0 | 0.0 | 5.3 | 1.3 | 6.6 | 1.9 | 1.4 |
