= Max Lynch =

Australian rules footballer (born 1998)

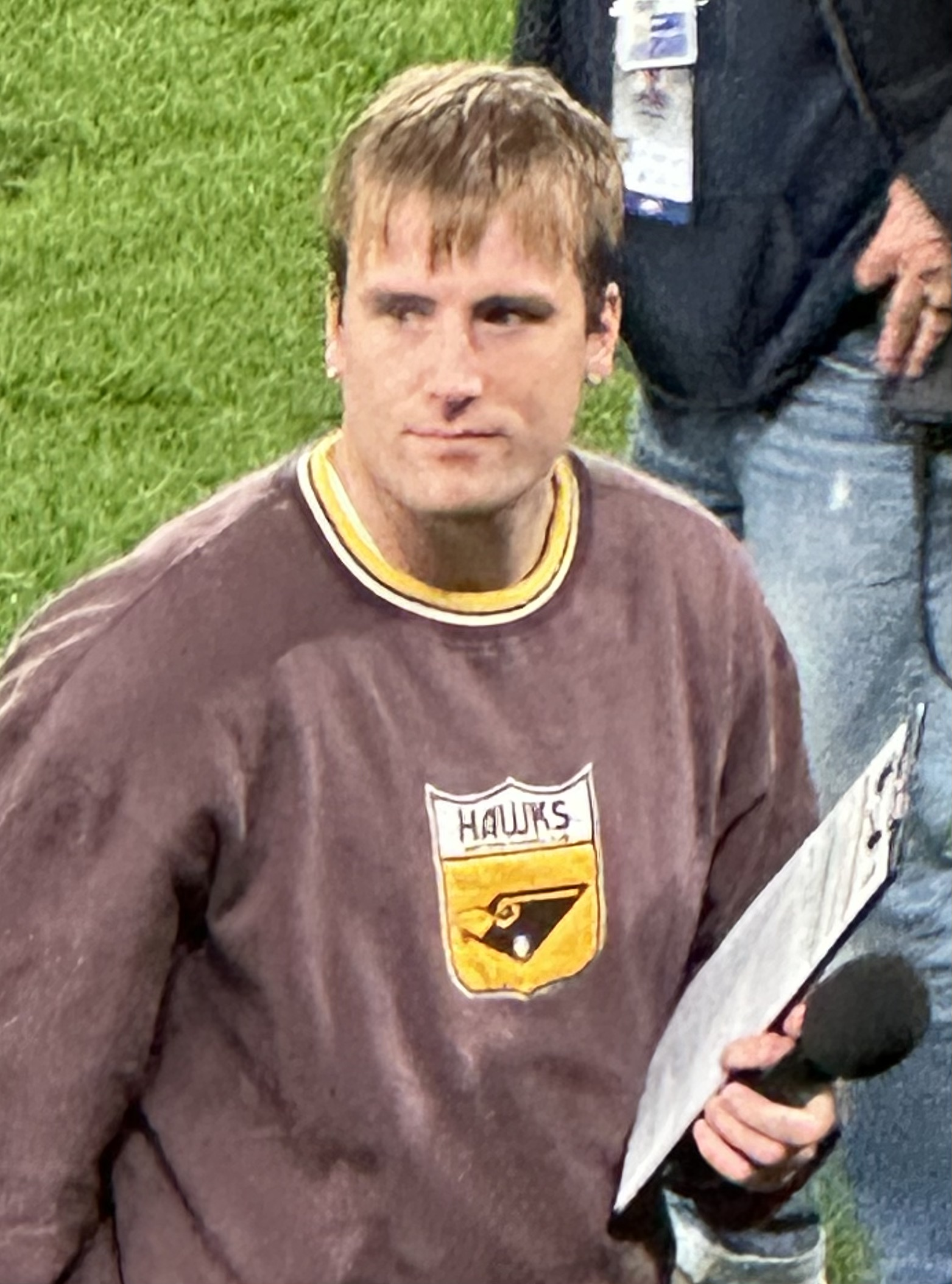
- Lynch in April 2025

Personal information
- Full name: Max Lynch
- Born: 12 September 1998 (age 28)
- Original team: Jindera Football Club (HFL)
- Draft: No. 51, 2017 rookie draft
- Debut: Round 15, 2020, Collingwood vs. Brisbane Lions, at The Gabba
- Height: 2 m (6 ft 7 in)
- Weight: 98 kg (216 lb)
- Position: Ruck

Playing career^{1}
Years	Club	Games (Goals)
2017–2021	Collingwood	3 (0)
2022–2023	Hawthorn	8 (4)
Total		11 (4)
- ^{1} Playing statistics correct to the end of 2023.

Max Lynch (born 12 September 1998) is a former professional Australian rules footballer who played with the Collingwood Football Club and the Hawthorn Football Club in the Australian Football League (AFL).

== Early football ==
Lynch originally played his junior football for the Jindera Bulldogs in the Hume Football League, prior to playing football for the Albury Football Club and the Murray Bushrangers in the NAB League.

Lynch was selected as part of the 2016 Allies Squad in the AFL Under 18 Championships.

== AFL career ==
Lynch was selected at pick 51 of the 2017 AFL rookie draft from the Murray Bushrangers to Collingwood. He made his debut in round 15 of the 2020 AFL season in the club's eight point loss to the Brisbane Lions.

Following the 2021 AFL season, Lynch sought and gained a trade to Hawthorn for greater opportunity.

Lynch played the opening game of the 2022 season, but was concussed during the second quarter and had to be replaced.

On 1 August 2023 Lynch retired after an AFL Independent Medical Concussion Panel recommended that he cease participation in contact sport permanently.

== Statistics ==
Updated to the end of 2023.

Legend
G	Goals	K	Kicks	D	Disposals	T	Tackles
B	Behinds	H	Handballs	M	Marks	H/O	Hit-outs

Season	Team	No.	Games	Totals								Averages (per game)								Votes
Season	Team	No.	Games	G	B	K	H	D	M	T	H/O	G	B	K	H	D	M	T	H/O	Votes
2017	Collingwood	45	0	—	—	—	—	—	—	—	—	—	—	—	—	—	—	—	—	0
2018	Collingwood	45	0	—	—	—	—	—	—	—	—	—	—	—	—	—	—	—	—	0
2019	Collingwood	45	0	—	—	—	—	—	—	—	—	—	—	—	—	—	—	—	—	0
2020 (Note: The 2020 season was played with 17 home-and-away matches per team (down from 22) and 16-minute quarters with time on (down from 20-minute quarters with time on) due to the impact of the COVID-19 pandemic.)	Collingwood	45	1	0	0	1	1	2	0	5	2	0.0	0.0	1.0	1.0	2.0	0.0	5.0	2.0	0
2021	Collingwood	15	2	0	0	9	14	23	4	5	41	0.0	0.0	4.5	7.0	11.5	2.0	2.5	20.5	0
2022	Hawthorn	18	7	4	1	37	25	62	14	11	123	0.6	0.1	5.3	3.6	8.9	2.0	1.6	17.6	0
2023	Hawthorn	18	1	0	0	0	2	2	0	1	9	0.0	0.0	0.0	2.0	2.0	0.0	1.0	9.0	0
Career			11	4	1	47	42	89	18	22	175	0.4	0.1	4.3	3.8	8.1	1.6	2.0	15.9	0
