= Will Kelly (Australian footballer) =

Australian rules footballer (born 2000)

Personal information
- Born: 16 August 2000 (age 26)
- Original team: Oakleigh Chargers
- Draft: No. 29, 2018 AFL draft, Collingwood
- Debut: 10 July 2020, Collingwood vs. Hawthorn, at GIANTS Stadium
- Height: 194 cm (6 ft 4 in)
- Weight: 84 kg (185 lb)
- Position: Defender

Playing career^{1}
Years	Club	Games (Goals)
2019–2023	Collingwood	5 (1)
- ^{1} Playing statistics correct to the end of the 2023 season.

Will Kelly (born 16 August 2000) is an Australian rules footballer who played for the Collingwood Football Club in the Australian Football League (AFL). Son of Craig Kelly, who played for Collingwood in the VFL/AFL, he played for the Oakleigh Chargers in the TAC Cup before he was drafted with pick 29 in 2018 under the father–son rule.

== Junior and state football ==
Kelly played junior football for the Glen Iris Gladiators in the Yarra Junior Football League, making over 100 appearances for them. He played at his school, Scotch College, mostly as a forward. Kelly also played under-18s football for the Oakleigh Chargers in the TAC Cup, before getting selected by Collingwood. In 2017, he played only one game for Oakleigh Chargers. The next year he found his niche and helped lead the Oakleigh Chargers to the Grand Final, which they lost to the Dandenong Stingrays by four points. He played his last four games of the season with a stress fracture in his ankle. His performance also led to him representing Vic Metro in the 2018 AFL Under 18 Championships, playing all four games. During the 2019 AFL season, his first season on Collingwood's books, Kelly made four appearances with the club's Victorian Football League (VFL) side.

== AFL career ==
Kelly was drafted by Collingwood with the 29th draft pick in the 2018 AFL draft, under the father–son rule, with Collingwood matching Adelaide's bid. Like team-mates Josh Daicos and Callum Brown, Kelly decided not to wear his father's guernsey number, picking a new number. Kelly debuted for Collingwood in Round 6 of the 2020 AFL season, in the club's 32-point victory over Hawthorn. collecting five disposals and kicking a goal. Unfortunately he dislocated his elbow, and missed the rest of the season. In October 2023, he was delisted by the club, having played only five games in five seasons.

== Playing style ==
Kelly is an athletic tall defender who can play one-on-one and negate his opponent. He has modelled his game on Collingwood team-mate, Jeremy Howe.

== Personal life ==
Kelly is the son of former Collingwood premiership player Craig Kelly. His brother, Jake, played football in the Australian Football League after Collingwood passed on drafting him.

== Statistics ==
Updated to the end of the 2023 season.

Legend
G	Goals	K	Kicks	D	Disposals	T	Tackles
B	Behinds	H	Handballs	M	Marks

Season	Team	No.	Games	Totals							Averages (per game)						
Season	Team	No.	Games	G	B	K	H	D	M	T	G	B	K	H	D	M	T
2019	Collingwood	27	0	—	—	—	—	—	—	—	—	—	—	—	—	—	—
2020 (Note: The 2020 season was played with 17 home-and-away matches per team (down from 22) and 16-minute quarters with time on (down from 20-minute quarters with time on) due to the impact of the COVID-19 pandemic.)	Collingwood	27	1	1	1	4	1	5	2	0	1.0	1.0	4.0	1.0	5.0	2.0	0.0
2021	Collingwood	20	2	0	0	6	5	11	4	0	0.0	0.0	3.0	2.5	5.5	2.0	0.0
2022	Collingwood	20	0	—	—	—	—	—	—	—	—	—	—	—	—	—	—
2023	Collingwood	20	2	0	0	9	4	13	6	2	0.0	0.0	4.5	2.0	6.5	3.0	1.0
Career			5	1	1	19	10	29	12	2	0.2	0.2	3.8	2.0	5.8	2.4	0.4
