= Maddie Shevlin =

Australian rules footballer

Personal information
- Born: 21 September 1997 (age 29)
- Original team: Gungahlin Jets (AFL Canberra)
- Draft: No. 13, 2017 rookie draft No. 19, 2018 national draft
- Debut: Round 3, 2019, Collingwood vs. Fremantle, at Fremantle Oval
- Height: 174 cm (5 ft 9 in)
- Position: Wing/forward
- Other occupation: Teaching assistant

Club information
- Current club: Richmond
- Number: 35

Playing career^{1}
Years	Club	Games (Goals)
2018	Melbourne	0 (0)
2019–2021	Collingwood	13 (1)
2022 (S6)–	Richmond	27 (3)
Total		40 (4)
- ^{1} Playing statistics correct to the end of the 2023 season.

Maddie Shevlin (born 21 September 1997) is an Australian rules footballer playing for Richmond in the AFL Women's (AFLW). Initially a tag rugby player, Shevlin played with the Gungahlin Jets in the AFL Canberra for two seasons before she was drafted by Melbourne in the 2017 AFLW rookie draft. Delisted after one season, she was re-drafted by Collingwood in the 2018 national draft and made her professional debut in round 3 of the 2019 season. After three seasons she was traded to Richmond.

== Junior career ==
Shevlin originally played OzTag, a variant of rugby league, representing Australia in the sport. She took up football in 2016 after encouragement from her teacher. Shevlin began playing as a wing for the Gungahlin Jets in the AFL Canberra, but missed ten weeks of her first season after she dislocated her thumb in her first match.

At the start of 2017, Shevlin was selected in the Canberra Raiders' rugby nines team but switched her focus to football. In her second season with the Jets, she played up forward often enough to be their leading goalkicker. Additionally, Shevlin was a member of Greater Western Sydney's academy.

== AFLW career ==
After impressing Melbourne coach Mick Stinear in a scouting clinic, Shevlin was selected by the club with pick 13 in the 2017 AFLW rookie draft. While at the club, she wore number 35. She did not play a match in 2018 and was delisted at the end of the season. In the off-season, Shevlin played for the Casey Demons in the VFL Women's, winning their best and fairest and leading the club in tackles (averaging five per match), contested possessions (eight) and disposals (15). Her form saw her re-drafted by Collingwood with pick 19 in the 2018 AFLW national draft. Shevlin debuted in round 3 against Fremantle at Fremantle Oval, the first of five games for the 2019 season. After three seasons with Collingwood, Shevlin was traded to Richmond in exchange for Sabrina Frederick.

== Statistics ==
Statistics are correct the end of the 2021 season.

Legend
G	Goals	K	Kicks	D	Disposals	T	Tackles
B	Behinds	H	Handballs	M	Marks

Season	Team	No.	Games	Totals							Averages (per game)						
Season	Team	No.	Games	G	B	K	H	D	M	T	G	B	K	H	D	M	T
2018	Melbourne	35	0	—	—	—	—	—	—	—	—	—	—	—	—	—	—
2019	Collingwood	35	5	1	2	40	8	48	10	13	0.2	0.4	8.0	1.6	9.6	2.0	2.6
2020	Collingwood	35	5	0	1	26	8	34	14	6	0.0	0.2	5.2	1.6	6.8	2.8	1.2
2021	Collingwood	35	3	0	2	23	2	25	7	7	0.0	0.7	7.7	0.7	8.3	2.3	2.3
Career			13	1	5	89	18	107	31	26	0.1	0.4	6.8	1.4	8.2	2.4	2.0

== Personal life ==
Outside of football, Shevlin works as a teaching assistant at Xavier College.

Shevlin has supported Collingwood since her grandfather, a fan of the club, died when she was four years old.
