= Richmond v Collingwood (2018 AFL preliminary final) =

Australian rules football match

2018 AFL First Preliminary Final

Richmond	Collingwood
8.10 (58)	15.7 (97)
- Date: 21 September 2018
- Stadium: Melbourne Cricket Ground; Melbourne
- Attendance: 94,959

Broadcast in Australia
- Network: Seven Network

The 2018 AFL First Preliminary Final was an Australian rules football match played between the Richmond Football Club and the Collingwood Football Club at the Melbourne Cricket Ground on 21 September 2018. It was the first preliminary final to determine who will play in the 2018 AFL Grand Final. Collingwood defeated the reigning and minor premiers Richmond by 39 points, winning 15.7 (97) to 8.10 (58).

The result was an upset, as Richmond entered the match as the defending premiers and had won 22 consecutive matches at the MCG. Collingwood's victory was a first finals win against Richmond since 1937 and ended Richmond's 22-game winning streak at the MCG and secured the club's first grand final appearance since 2011.

== Background ==
Richmond entered the 2018 finals series as the minor (only losing 4 interstate matches during the entire home-and-away season) and reigning AFL premiers, having won the 2017 AFL Grand Final. The Tigers had enjoyed a successful season and were seeking to qualify for a second consecutive grand final.

Collingwood had finished the home-and-away season 3rd on the ladder. They lost their qualifying final against West Coast by 16 points at Optus Stadium and then played Greater Western Sydney the following week in a semi-final at the MCG which Collingwood have won by 10 points. The match against Richmond offered the Magpies an opportunity to reach their first grand final since 2011.

== Scorecard ==
First Preliminary Final
21 September 2018, 7:50 pm	Richmond	def. by	Collingwood	MCG (crowd: 94,959)
1.3 (9); 2.8 (20); 6.10 (46); 8.10 (58)	Q1; Q2; Q3; Final	5.2 (32); 10.4 (64); 12.7 (79); 15.7 (97)	Umpires: Rosebury, Stevic, Ryan; Television broadcast: Seven Network
Riewoldt 5 Higgins 2 Houli 1	Goals	4 De Goey; 3 Cox; 2 Crisp, Mihocek; 1 Varcoe, Treloar, Grundy, Stephenson
Riewoldt, Cotchin, Houli, Higgins	Best	Sidebottom, Cox, Grundy, Adams, Crisp, De Goey, Greenwood
Injuries	Howe (ankle)

=== First half ===
Collingwood dominated the opening half through pressure around the ball and effective forward entries. Richmond struggled to generate scoring opportunities, while the Magpies repeatedly capitalised on their attacking possessions.

Collingwood forward Mason Cox was a major influence, particularly during the second quarter. Cox kicked three goals in that quarter and used his height to take contested marks inside the forward line. He finished with 11 marks, including eight contested marks.

By half-time, Collingwood had established a 44-point lead and placed Richmond under considerable pressure to recover the game.

=== Second half ===
Richmond improved after half-time and reduced the margin during the third quarter. Forward Jack Riewoldt contributed to the comeback, eventually finishing the match with five goals. The Tigers entered the final quarter trailing by 33 points.

Richmond continued its challenge during the final quarter, at one point reducing the deficit to 21 points. However, Collingwood responded with additional goals to re-establish its advantage and secure the 39-point victory.

For Collingwood, Jordan De Goey kicked four goals, while Steele Sidebottom recorded 41 disposals, the highest total of any player in the match.

== Aftermath ==
The victory sent Collingwood into the 2018 AFL Grand Final, ending a seven-year absence from the premiership decider. The Magpies subsequently lost the grand final to West Coast Eagles by five points, 11.8 (74) to 11.13 (79).

For Richmond, the defeat ended its premiership defence and its 22-match winning streak at the MCG. The result was widely reported as a major upset, with Collingwood's first-half performance and Cox's influence among the central themes of match coverage.

== Teams ==
Richmond
B:	12 David Astbury	18 Alex Rance	2 Dylan Grimes
HB:	15 Jayden Short	1 Nick Vlastuin	35 Nathan Broad
C:	6 Shaun Grigg	9 Trent Cotchin (c)	33 Kamdyn McIntosh
HF:	17 Daniel Rioli	10 Shane Edwards	28 Jack Higgins
F:	8 Jack Riewoldt	4 Dustin Martin	22 Josh Caddy
Foll:	25 Toby Nankervis	23 Kane Lambert	3 Dion Prestia
Int:	11 Jason Castagna	14 Bachar Houli	30 Reece Conca
Int:	34 Jack Graham		
Coach:	Damien Hardwick		

Collingwood
B:	37 Brayden Maynard	8 Tom Langdon	25 Jack Crisp
HB:	38 Jeremy Howe	6 Tyson Goldsack	19 Levi Greenwood
C:	16 Chris Mayne	10 Scott Pendlebury (c)	21 Tom Phillips
HF:	32 Will Hoskin-Elliott	41 Brody Mihocek	2 Jordan De Goey
F:	24 Josh Thomas	46 Mason Cox	35 Jaidyn Stephenson
Foll:	4 Brodie Grundy	13 Taylor Adams	22 Steele Sidebottom
Int:	7 Adam Treloar	14 James Aish	18 Travis Varcoe
Int:	36 Brayden Sier		
Coach:	Nathan Buckley		

== See also ==
- 2018 AFL season
- 2018 AFL Grand Final
