= 2018 AFL Grand Final =

Grand final of the 2018 Australian Football League season

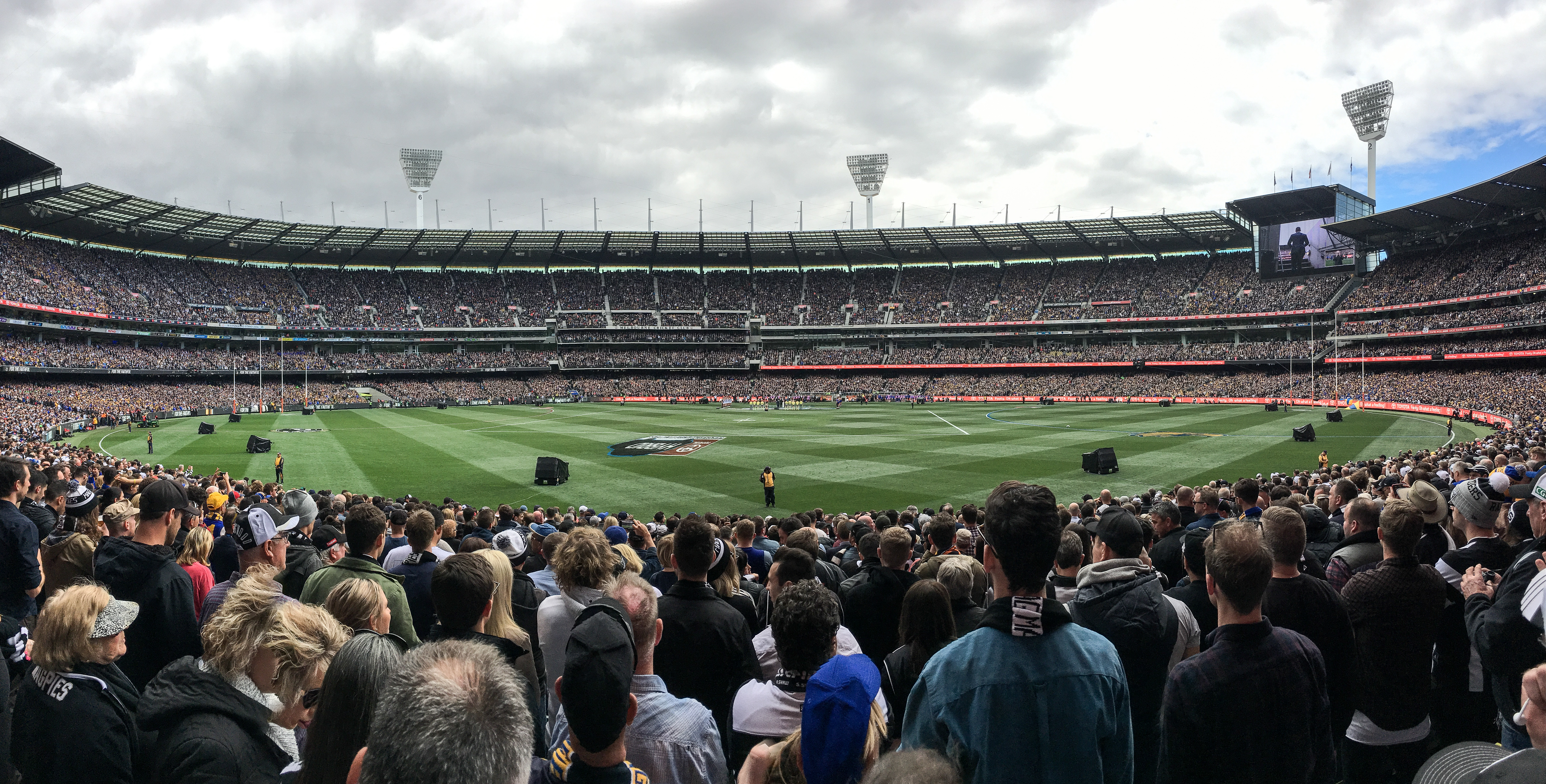
- Panorama of the Melbourne Cricket Ground, five minutes prior to the start of the match

West Coast	Collingwood
11.13 (79)	11.8 (74)
	1	2	3	4
WCE	2.2 (14)	4.3 (27)	8.7 (55)	11.13 (79)
COL	5.1 (31)	6.3 (39)	8.7 (55)	11.8 (74)
- Date: 29 September 2018, 2:30 pm
- Stadium: Melbourne Cricket Ground
- Attendance: 100,022
- Favourite: Collingwood
- Umpires: Brett Rosebury, Shaun Ryan; Matt Stevic

Ceremonies
- Pre-match entertainment: The Black Eyed Peas, Jimmy Barnes, Mike Brady
- National anthem: Mahalia Barnes
- Post-match entertainment: Jimmy Barnes

Accolades
- Norm Smith Medallist: Luke Shuey
- Jock McHale Medallist: Adam Simpson

Broadcast in Australia
- Network: Seven Network
- Commentators: Bruce McAvaney (host and commentator); Hamish McLachlan (host and master of ceremonies); Brian Taylor (commentator); Wayne Carey (expert commentator); Cameron Ling (expert commentator); Daisy Pearce (boundary rider); Matthew Richardson (boundary rider); Leigh Matthews (analyst); Jimmy Bartel (analyst)

The 2018 AFL Grand Final was an Australian rules football game contested between the West Coast Eagles and the Collingwood Football Club at the Melbourne Cricket Ground on 29 September 2018. It was the 123rd annual grand final of the Australian Football League (formerly Victorian Football League), staged to determine the premiers for the 2018 AFL season. The match, attended by 100,022 spectators, was won by West Coast by a margin of five points, marking the club's fourth premiership and first since 2006. West Coast's Luke Shuey won the Norm Smith Medal as the player judged best on ground.

It is regarded as one of the greatest grand finals as well as one of the greatest games in AFL history, finishing first in a public poll of the AFL's 50 greatest games of the last 50 years in 2020.

The presentation ceremony following the match was the most-watched television program in Australia for the 2018 calendar year, marking the fifth year running the AFL grand final topped television viewership, with 2.62 million viewers across the five largest Australian metropolitan cities.

== Background ==
Beaten by Greater Western Sydney in the previous season's semi-finals, West Coast recorded its best season in three years, with a 16–6 win–loss record, to finish second on the ladder. The club hosted third-placed Collingwood in the second qualifying final at Perth Stadium and overcame the Magpies by sixteen points to advance to a preliminary final. There, the Eagles hosted Melbourne and won comfortably by 66 points to advance to the grand final for the first time since losing the 2015 AFL Grand Final to Hawthorn.

Collingwood had missed the finals for the past four years and finished the 2017 season in thirteenth position, so was not considered a credible premiership chance at the start of the year. Despite this, the club produced its best season since 2011, finishing third. Collingwood faced the West Coast Eagles in Perth in its qualifying final and had led at various stages of the match before being overrun in the last quarter to lose by sixteen points. They rebounded to defeat Greater Western Sydney in the second semi-final by ten points, then had an upset win against reigning premiers Richmond by 39 points in the preliminary final to advance to the grand final.

== Entertainment ==
As pre-match entertainment, the Black Eyed Peas performed a number of their hit singles, including "Where Is the Love?", "Let's Get It Started", "I Gotta Feeling" and their new single "Big Love". Filipina singer Jessica Reynoso filled in on vocals for former band member Fergie. Their set was followed by singer Jimmy Barnes, who started his performance with a rendition of "Flame Trees". Mike Brady performed "Up There Cazaly", his own traditional grand final song, while the national anthem was sung by Mahalia Barnes, Jimmy Barnes' daughter.

== Match summary ==
=== First quarter ===
Collingwood dominated most of the opening quarter. West Coast spearhead Josh Kennedy had the first score of the game—a behind—before the Magpies scored the first five goals. The first goal came from Travis Varcoe at the five-minute mark, followed by two in quick succession from young forward Jaidyn Stephenson, one from Jordan De Goey at the 16-minute mark, and another from Will Hoskin-Elliott after 22 minutes, increasing the margin to 29 points. West Coast scored two late goals in the final couple of minutes of the quarter to reduce the margin to 17 points at quarter time: the first, after 27 minutes, was scored from a ricochet off Willie Rioli's shin on the goal-line and needed a video review to uphold the on-field decision; and the latter was scored by Kennedy from a set shot in the 29th minute.

=== Second quarter ===
The second quarter was low-scoring, with only two behinds scored during the first twenty minutes of the quarter: one from West Coast's Mark Hutchings at the four-minute mark, and a rushed behind to Collingwood almost eighteen minutes into the quarter. De Goey broke the drought with his second goal of the afternoon, restoring Collingwood's lead to a relatively comfortable 23 points. But, as in the opening quarter, the Eagles scored two late goals: one from Hutchings at the 22-minute mark, and the other from Luke Shuey at the 26-minute mark, to reduce Collingwood's lead to only twelve points at half time.

=== Third quarter ===
West Coast and Collingwood traded goals in the third quarter. A very early goal to Kennedy inside the first minute of the quarter reduced the margin to six points, before tall forward Mason Cox kicked a goal in the fifth minute to restore Collingwood's two-goal lead. Jamie Cripps kicked a goal for West Coast in the eighth minute, and then Taylor Adams kicked one for Collingwood only a minute later, again restoring the Magpies' lead to two goals. Jack Darling scored his first goal of the match nine minutes later to bring the margin back to a goal.

In the 21st minute, a pivotal moment occurred: Adams attempted to clear the ball from Collingwood's backline with a dangerous miskick which went towards Stephenson at centre half-back. Collingwood runner Alex Woodward, who was in the area delivering another message at the time (since runners were still allowed on the ground during general play at the time, as the rule limiting their access to the ground was introduced only in 2019), accidentally impeded Stephenson's access to the marking contest, allowing West Coast midfielder Elliot Yeo an uncontested intercept mark from which he kicked a 50-metre (55 yd) set shot and put West Coast ahead for the first time since the beginning of the game. There were no more goals in the quarter, with the Magpies initially edging ahead once again with three consecutive behinds in time-on, and Shuey levelling the scores at 8.7 (55) apiece with a late behind, which stood as the three-quarter time score.

=== Fourth quarter ===
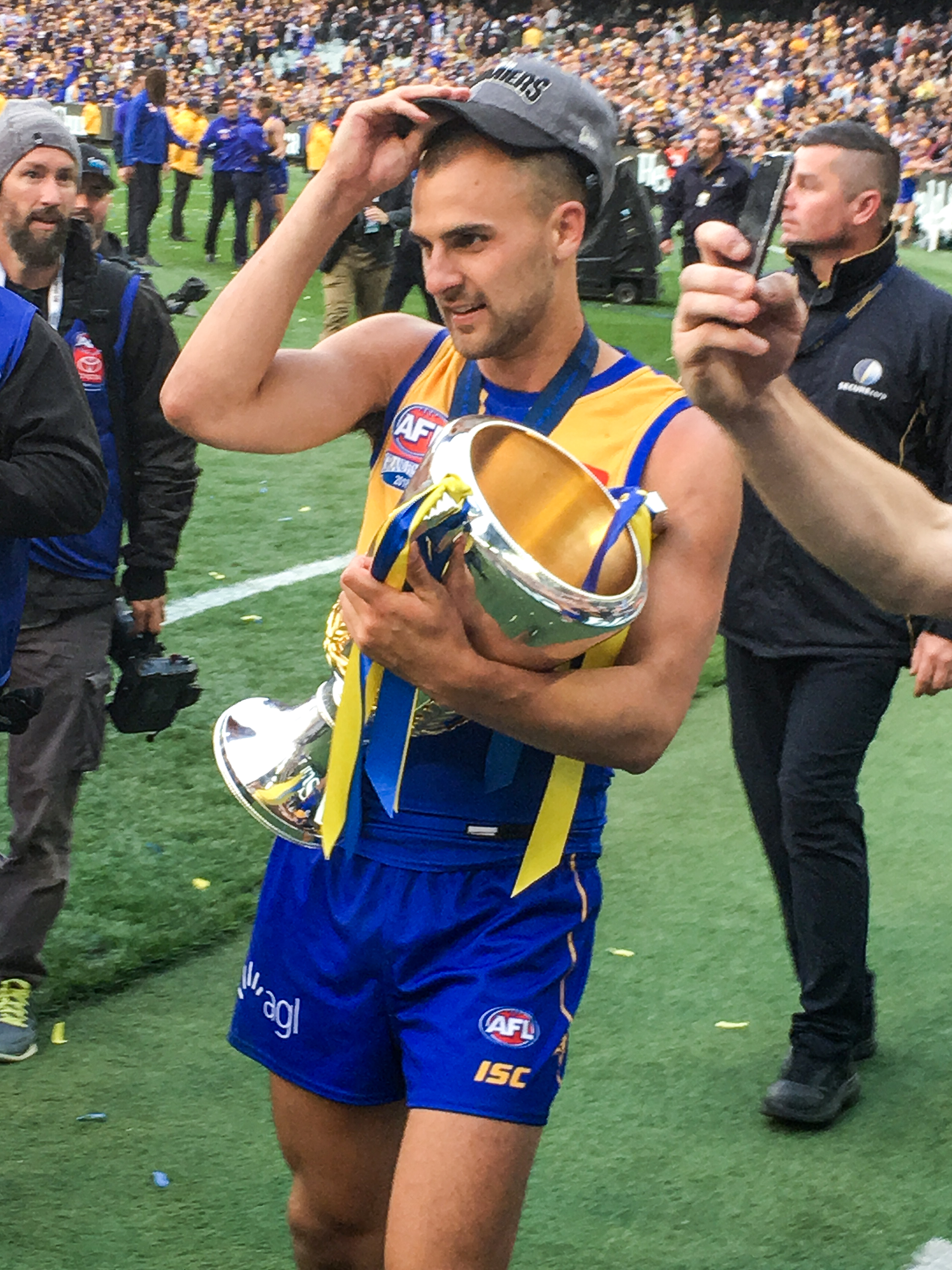
Dom Sheed, who kicked the winning goal, with the premiership cup after the grand final

The final term started off rapidly, with three goals scored within the first four minutes. Collingwood started the quarter with Brody Mihocek kicking a goal off the opening passage of play after just 34 seconds, and De Goey scoring his third goal for the match only a minute later to extend the margin to 12 points. Nathan Vardy kicked a goal at the three-minute mark to bring the deficit back to 6 points. Cox scored his second goal at the seven-minute mark to extend the margin back to 11 points, and Kennedy responded with his third goal 90 seconds later to bring the deficit back to five points.

The Eagles dominated the contest from this point forward, at one point leading the inside-50 count for the quarter 14–3; however, they repeatedly failed to convert, as four consecutive shots at goal in the middle portion of the quarter were behinds, narrowing the margin to one point. Collingwood's final score of the game, a behind, came from Hoskin-Elliott in the 22nd minute.

If he kicks the goal, I think West Coast can win the grand final. Two minutes and just under. Massive, Sheed from the boundary, needs to be inch-perfect, he is. He's got the most impossible goal. Unbelievable, the most acute angle in footy and Sheed has kicked a remarkable grand final goal.

— Channel 7 commentator Brian Taylor calling Dom Sheed’s goal with under two minutes remaining in the game.

With less than three minutes remaining, West Coast put together a sequence of play starting from a spectacular mark by McGovern in defence, continuing with marks from Vardy and Liam Ryan before ending with a mark in the forward pocket by Dom Sheed – who was aided by a contentious shepherd in the marking contest by teammate Rioli on opponent Brayden Maynard. From a distance of about 45 metres (49 yd) and almost on the boundary line, Sheed kicked a goal to put West Coast in front by four points with less than two minutes left. West Coast attacked again from the ensuing centre clearance, and Darling dropped an uncontested mark in the goal-square from which he would almost certainly have sealed victory for the Eagles. Collingwood managed to force a behind to extend the margin to five points inside the final minute, but they could not rebound the ensuing kick-in with Shuey taking an intercept mark from it. The siren sounded shortly after to give West Coast a five point win.

=== Norm Smith Medal ===
Norm Smith Medal voting tally
Position	Player	Club	Total votes	Voting summary
1st (winner)	Luke Shuey	West Coast Eagles	11	3,3,3,2
2nd	Taylor Adams	Collingwood	7	3,2,2
3rd	Dom Sheed	West Coast Eagles	4	2,1,1
4th (tied)	Tom Langdon	Collingwood	1	1
4th (tied)	Jeremy McGovern	West Coast Eagles	1	1

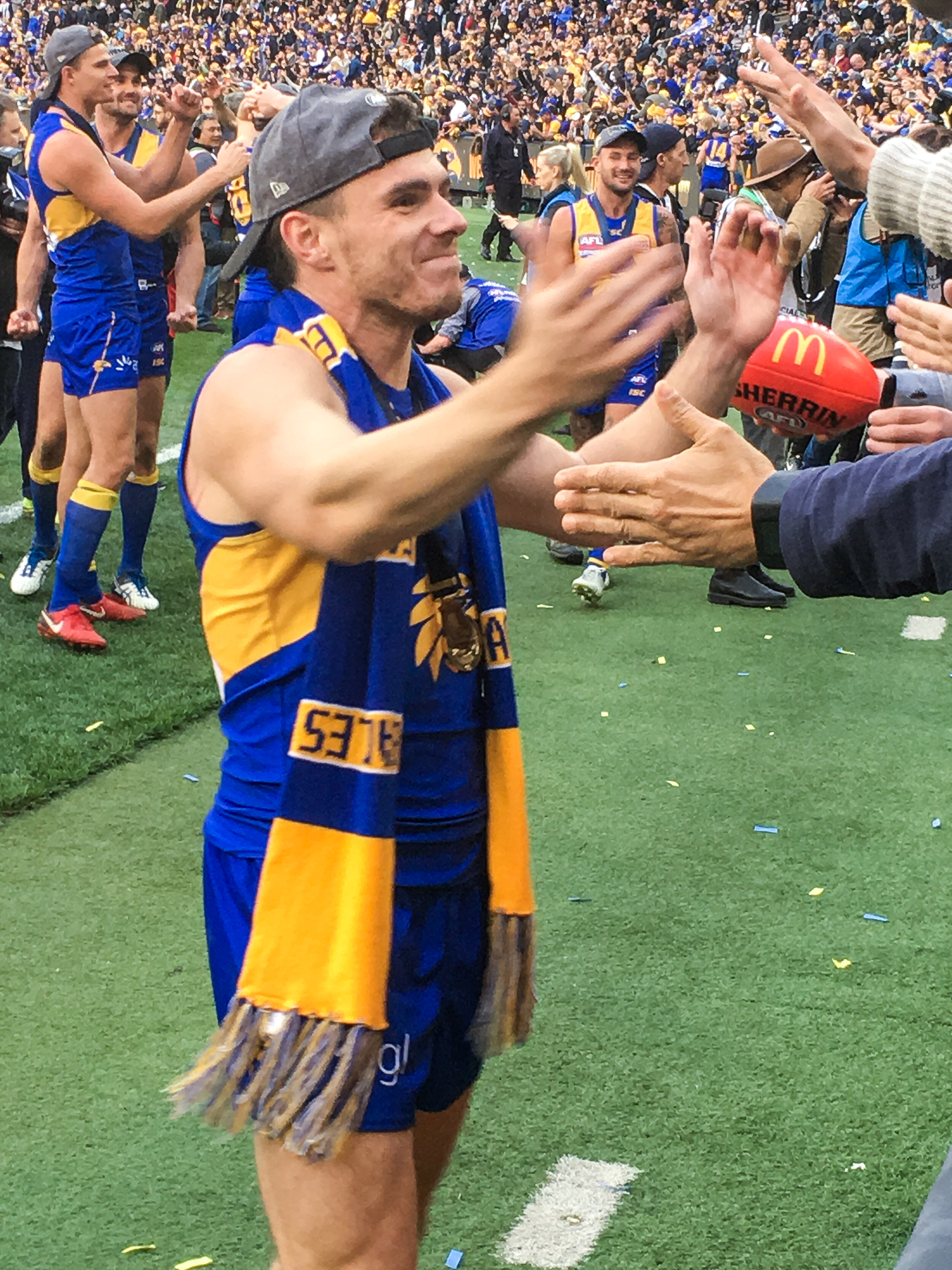
Luke Shuey, winner of the Norm Smith Medal, celebrating West Coast's victory

With 11 votes out of a maximum possible 12, Luke Shuey was awarded the Norm Smith Medal, after collecting 34 disposals, eight clearances and a crucial second-quarter goal. The award was presented by 2001 Norm Smith medallist Shaun Hart. Chaired by Gavin Wanganeen, the voters and their choices were as follows:

Voter	Role	3 Votes	2 Votes	1 Vote
Gavin Wanganeen	Former AFL player	Taylor Adams	Luke Shuey	Jeremy McGovern
Wayne Carey	Channel 7	Luke Shuey	Taylor Adams	Dom Sheed
Bridget Lacy	The West Australian	Luke Shuey	Taylor Adams	Dom Sheed
John Longmire	Sydney Swans Coach	Luke Shuey	Dom Sheed	Tom Langdon

== Teams ==
The teams were announced on 27 September 2018. Both sides went into the match unchanged from their preliminary final teams.

West Coast Eagles	Collingwood

West Coast
B:	25 Shannon Hurn (c)	37 Tom Barrass	31 Will Schofield
HB:	28 Tom Cole	20 Jeremy McGovern	23 Lewis Jetta
C:	8 Jack Redden	6 Elliot Yeo	7 Chris Masten
HF:	34 Mark Hutchings	27 Jack Darling	2 Mark LeCras
F:	44 Willie Rioli	17 Josh Kennedy	15 Jamie Cripps
Foll:	29 Scott Lycett	13 Luke Shuey	4 Dom Sheed
Int:	1 Liam Ryan	14 Liam Duggan	18 Daniel Venables
Int:	19 Nathan Vardy		
Coach:	Adam Simpson		

Collingwood
B:	25 Jack Crisp	8 Tom Langdon	37 Brayden Maynard
HB:	18 Travis Varcoe	6 Tyson Goldsack	38 Jeremy Howe
C:	21 Tom Phillips	10 Scott Pendlebury (c)	7 Adam Treloar
HF:	2 Jordan De Goey	41 Brody Mihocek	32 Will Hoskin-Elliott
F:	35 Jaidyn Stephenson	46 Mason Cox	24 Josh Thomas
Foll:	4 Brodie Grundy	13 Taylor Adams	22 Steele Sidebottom
Int:	36 Brayden Sier	14 James Aish	16 Chris Mayne
Int:	19 Levi Greenwood		
Coach:	Nathan Buckley		

Umpires

The umpiring panel, comprising three field umpires, four boundary umpires, two goal umpires and an emergency in each position is given below.

2018 AFL Grand Final umpires
Position					Emergency
Field:	8 Brett Rosebury (8)	9 Matt Stevic (6)	25 Shaun Ryan (7)		18 Ray Chamberlain
Boundary:	Nathan Doig (5)	Chris Gordon (3)	Michael Marantelli (3)	Mark Thomson (6)	Brett Dalgleish
Goal:	Steven Piperno (1)	Stephen Williams (1)			Matthew Dervan

Numbers in brackets represent the number of grand finals umpired, including 2018.

== Scoreboard ==
Grand final
29 September (2:30 pm)	West Coast	def.	Collingwood	MCG (crowd: 100,022)	Report
2.2 (14); 4.3 (27); 8.7 (55); 11.13 (79)	Q1; Q2; Q3; Final	5.1 (31); 6.3 (39); 8.7 (55); 11.8 (74)	Umpires: Rosebury, Stevic, Ryan; Norm Smith Medal: Luke Shuey; Television broadcast: Seven Network; National anthem: Mahalia Barnes
3: Kennedy; 1: Sheed, Hutchings, Shuey, Darling, Yeo, Cripps, Vardy, Rioli	Goals	3: De Goey; 2: Cox, Stephenson; 1: Hoskin-Elliott, Varcoe, Mihocek, Adams
Shuey, Sheed, Barrass, Kennedy, Hutchings, Schofield, McGovern	Best	Adams, Langdon, Crisp, Treloar, De Goey, Mayne
Nil	Injuries	Nil
Nil	Reports	Nil

== Media coverage ==
=== Radio coverage ===
Station	Region	Play-by-play commentators	Analysts	Boundary rider(s)
Triple M	National	James Brayshaw, Luke Darcy	Chris Judd, Paul Roos, Ash Chua (statistician)	Neroli Meadows, Dr. Rohan White
ABC Radio	National	Alister Nicholson, Clint Wheeldon	Mark Maclure, Shane Woewodin, Brad Sewell	Kelli Underwood
AFL Nation	National	Peter Donegan, Stephen Quartermain	Terry Wallace, Kane Cornes	Abbey Holmes
3AW	Melbourne, VIC	Tim Lane, Tony Leonard	Leigh Matthews, Jimmy Bartel, Matthew Lloyd	Daniel Harford
SEN	Melbourne, VIC	Anthony Hudson, Gerard Whateley	Garry Lyon, Danny Frawley	Jack Heverin
6PR	Perth, WA	Adam Papalia, Karl Langdon	Brad Hardie	Frizz Ferguson

== See also ==
- 2018 AFL season
- 2018 AFL First Preliminary Final
