= Liam Ryan (footballer) =

Australian rules footballer (born 1996)

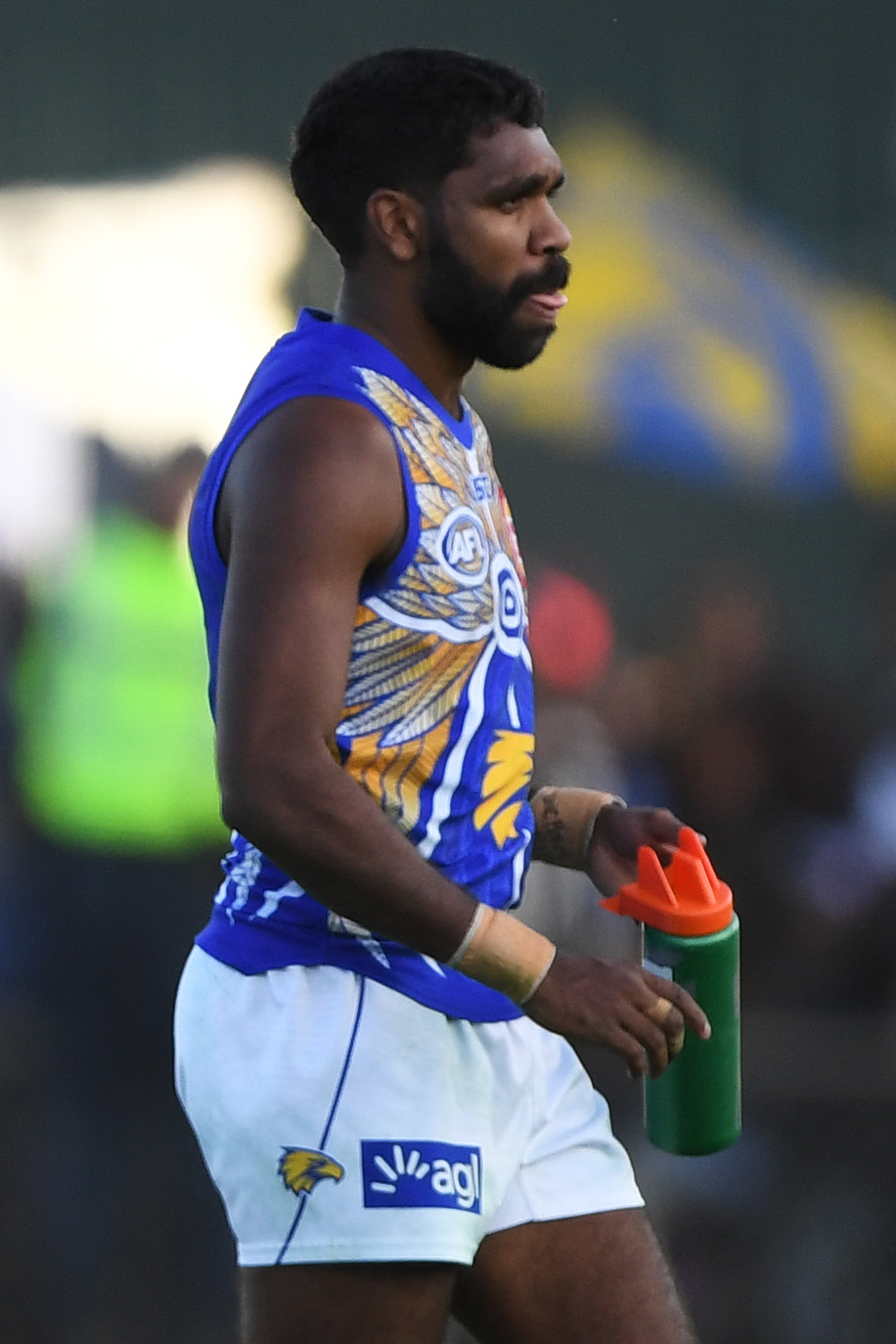
- Ryan playing for West Coast in July 2019

Personal information
- Full name: Liam Ryan
- Nickname: Flyin' Ryan
- Born: 2 October 1996 (age 30)
- Original team: Subiaco (WAFL)
- Draft: No. 26, 2017 national draft
- Debut: Round 1, 2018, West Coast vs. Sydney, at Optus Stadium
- Height: 179 cm (5 ft 10 in)
- Weight: 72 kg (159 lb)
- Position: Forward

Club information
- Current club: St Kilda
- Number: 31

Playing career^{1}
Years	Club	Games (Goals)
2018–2025	West Coast	125 (158)
2026–	St Kilda	17 (33)
Total		142 (191)

Representative team honours
Years	Team	Games (Goals)
2025	Indigenous All-Stars	1 (1)
- ^{1} Playing statistics correct to the end of the 2026 season.

Career highlights
- AFL premiership player: 2018; All-Australian team: 2020; Bernie Naylor Medal: 2017; AFL Mark of the Year: 2019; 22under22 team: 2019; St Kilda leading goalkicker: 2026

Liam Ryan (born 2 October 1996) is a professional Australian rules footballer playing for St Kilda Football Club in the Australian Football League (AFL). He is a small forward known widely for his vertical leap and high-marking ability.

== Early life and junior football ==
Ryan is from Geraldton, Western Australia. In 2016, he moved to Perth to play for the Subiaco Football Club in the West Australian Football League (WAFL). Beginning in the reserves, he was moved up to the seniors after only four games, and subsequently kicked 40 goals from 16 senior games. In the 2017 WAFL season, Ryan won the Bernie Naylor Medal as the competition's leading goal-kicker. He kicked 73 goals from 23 games.

== AFL career ==
=== Early career: 2018-2019 ===
==== 2018: First season and premiership ====
After his remarkable form in the WAFL in 2017 as a 21-year-old, Ryan was drafted into the AFL by West Coast with their third selection and twenty-sixth overall in the 2017 national draft. Ryan continued his form into his first preseason at the club and was selected to make his AFL debut in the game versus Sydney at Optus Stadium in the opening round of the 2018 season. On debut, he kicked his first AFL goal along with nine disposals.

Ryan was selected to play the following week and kicked six goals in the next two matches at AFL level, before injuring his ankle while kicking a final quarter goal during the Round 3 match against Geelong. The injury was predicted to keep Ryan out for the following 12 weeks.

Upon his return from injury in the Round 13 clash against Sydney, Ryan struggled to recapture his early season form, only kicking two goals in his first three games returning from injury. His brief return to the side, however, came to an end when he was hospitalised after crashing his car into a tree in the early morning on 2 July. Ryan missed the following week of football and was handed a two-match suspension by the club. Ryan subsequently played the following week in the WAFL, with senior coach Adam Simpson later revealing he had been under the influence of alcohol when he crashed his car.

His first WAFL game since being drafted saw Ryan kick three goals for East Perth against Swan Districts in Round 15 of the state competition. Ryan played the next two WAFL games, and despite only kicking a combined two goals in those next two games, he was recalled to the AFL side for the Round 20 Western Derby against Fremantle.

His return to the senior side saw a resurgence in form to finish the 2018 season, kicking three goals upon his return against Fremantle, and holding his spot in the team heading into the 2018 Finals Series. Ryan kicked three goals in the first two finals, enough to keep his spot heading into the 2018 Grand Final against Collingwood. Just two days before the Grand Final, it was announced that Ryan had been charged with drink driving over the car crash earlier that year in July, with a court date set for October 8.

Ryan had a mixed start to the Grand Final, sending Collingwood defender Brayden Maynard sprawling after a fierce bump before dropping a relatively simple chest mark 50 metres out from goal, and missing in front of goal twice in the second half. However, Ryan was able to redeem himself from his previous mistakes when he took a strong pack mark with two minutes to go in the game, played on and kicked the ball inside 50 to Dom Sheed in the forward pocket. Sheed would go on to kick the goal and give the Eagles the lead they needed to win the 2018 premiership, seeing Ryan finish his first AFL season with a premiership to his name.

Ryan faced the Armadale Magistrates Court on 8 October, pleading guilty to a charge of driving with a blood alcohol reading exceeding 0.08. As a result, Ryan was fined $1700 and had his driver's licence suspended for 18 months.

During the following preseason in November, Ryan left a three-day training camp in the Stirling Range National Park early. Senior coach Adam Simpson was quick to downplay the significance of the issue, stating that while "Liam [Ryan] struggled," he was "not too stressed" about it.

==== 2019: Building consistency and Mark of the Year ====
Ryan enjoyed an uninterrupted preseason following the 2018 season and was selected in the Round 1 side to face Brisbane, where he managed 8 disposals, 6 tackles and a goal. In the aftermath of the game, Ryan was attacked on social media with racial abuse, where he was referred to as a "monkey." The club strongly condemned the comments, releasing a video on X (then known as Twitter) taking a stand against racism.

Ryan built into some consistent form to start the season, kicking seven goals through Rounds 1-10 and averaging 11.0 disposals and 3.0 tackles a game, up on his tackling average of 1.9 in 2018. In Round 9 against Melbourne, Ryan took a spectacular mark in the goal square on top of Demons ruck Max Gawn. The mark would be voted Mark of the Year for the 2019 AFL season.

At the end of the 2025 season, Ryan officially requested a trade from the Eagles and was traded to St Kilda.

== Personal life ==
Ryan and his partner Evana have one daughter and twin boys.

== Statistics ==
Updated to the end of the 2026 season.

Legend
G	Goals	K	Kicks	D	Disposals	T	Tackles
B	Behinds	H	Handballs	M	Marks

Season	Team	No.	Games	Totals							Averages (per game)							Votes
Season	Team	No.	Games	G	B	K	H	D	M	T	G	B	K	H	D	M	T	Votes
2018^{#}	West Coast	1	13	20	15	113	37	150	37	25	1.5	1.2	8.7	2.8	11.5	2.8	1.9	0
2019	West Coast	1	24	30	19	211	70	281	72	51	1.3	0.8	8.8	2.9	11.7	3.0	2.1	0
2020 (Note: The 2020 season was played with 17 home-and-away matches per team (down from 22) and 16-minute quarters with time on (down from 20-minute quarters with time on) due to the impact of the COVID-19 pandemic.)	West Coast	1	18	26	16	140	54	194	66	32	1.4	0.9	7.8	3.0	10.8	3.7	1.8	1
2021	West Coast	1	14	24	10	116	28	144	55	21	1.7	0.7	8.3	2.0	10.3	3.9	1.5	2
2022	West Coast	1	17	19	12	153	34	187	71	39	1.1	0.7	9.0	2.0	11.0	4.2	2.3	0
2023	West Coast	1	3	4	1	30	9	39	15	11	1.3	0.3	10.0	3.0	13.0	5.0	3.7	0
2024	West Coast	1	16	13	11	143	57	200	68	27	0.8	0.7	8.9	3.6	12.5	4.3	1.7	0
2025	West Coast	1	20	22	22	161	64	225	69	45	1.1	1.1	8.1	3.2	11.3	3.5	2.3	3
2026	St Kilda	31	17	33	20	101	31	132	39	17	1.9	1.2	5.9	1.8	7.8	2.3	1.0	0
Career			142	191	126	1168	384	1552	492	268	1.3	0.9	8.2	2.7	10.9	3.5	1.9	6
