= Tom Barrass =

Australian rules footballer (born 1995)

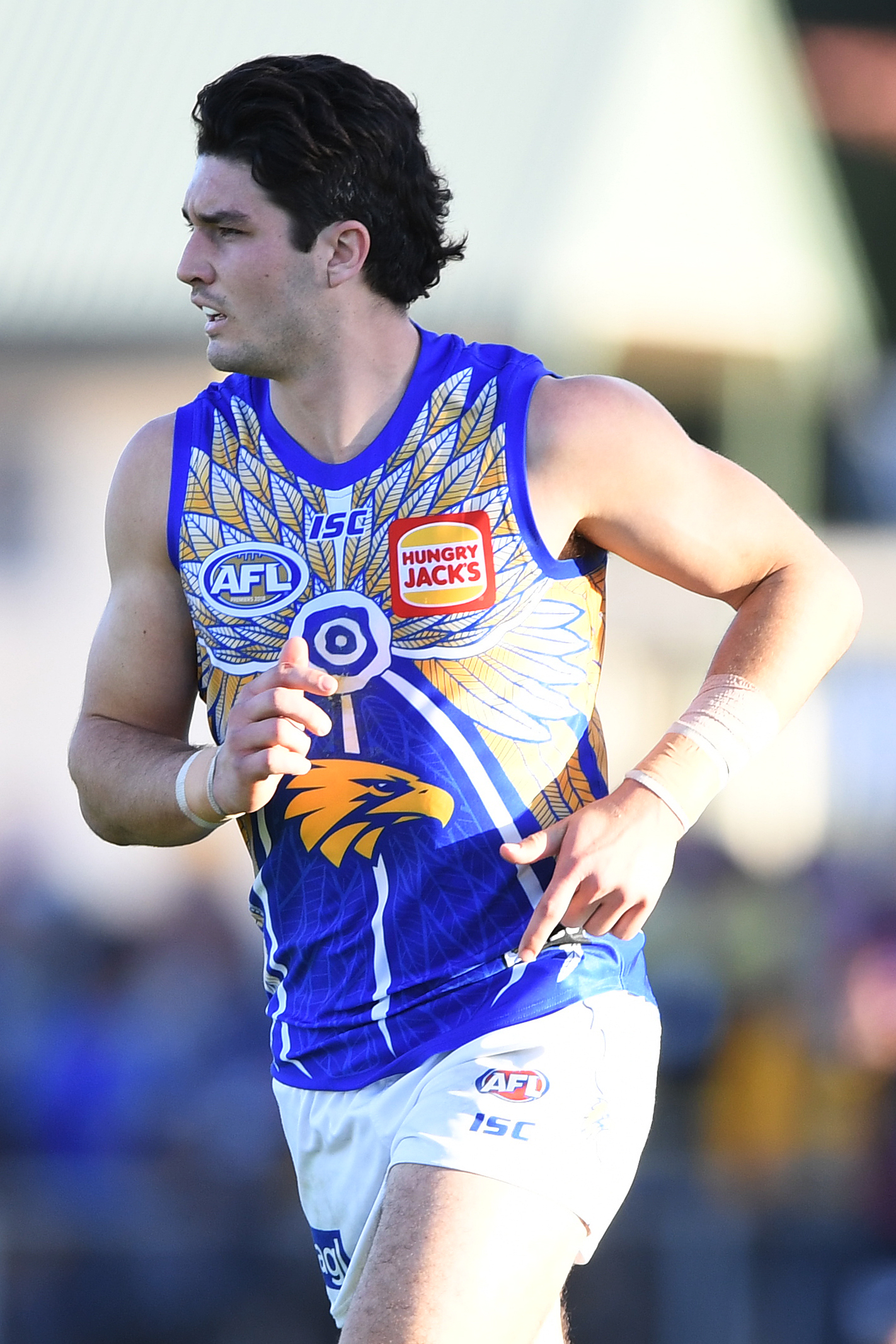
- Barrass playing for West Coast in July 2019

Personal information
- Full name: Thomas Donald Barrass
- Born: 8 October 1995 (age 31)
- Original team: Claremont (WAFL)
- Draft: No. 43, 2013 national draft
- Debut: Round 17, 2015, West Coast vs. Sydney, at Subiaco Oval
- Height: 197 cm (6 ft 6 in)
- Weight: 96 kg (212 lb)
- Position: Key defender

Club information
- Current club: Hawthorn
- Number: 37

Playing career^{1}
Years	Club	Games (Goals)
2015–2024	West Coast	150 (1)
2025–	Hawthorn	46 (1)
Total		196 (2)

Representative team honours
Years	Team	Games (Goals)
2026	Western Australia	1 (0)
- ^{1} Playing statistics correct to the end of 2026.

Career highlights
- AFL premiership player: 2018; John Worsfold Medal: 2022

Thomas Donald Barrass (born 8 October 1995) is an Australian rules footballer who plays for the Hawthorn Football Club in the Australian Football League (AFL). He has played as a key defender since his junior career with Claremont. Barrass was drafted by West Coast with pick 43 of the 2013 national draft, but did not make his senior debut until round 17 of the 2015 AFL season. He was nominated for the 2016 AFL Rising Star and won a premiership with West Coast in 2018.

== Early life ==
Barrass is the son of late journalist Tony Barrass. He grew up in the Perth suburb of Scarborough and played for Scarborough Junior Football Club. After the club was unable to field an under-17 team due to a lack of players, he focussed on playing for his school Hale. Barrass underwent a growth spurt and was recruited by his zoned Western Australian Football League (WAFL) club Claremont. He suffered two injuries which restricted him to three games for Claremont's colts (under-19s) in 2012.

Barrass rebounded to captain Claremont in their 2013 colts premiership. He recorded 18 disposals in Claremont's six-point grand final victory over South Fremantle, and believed he was close to lining up for the senior side before dislocating his finger. Barrass played for Western Australia in the 2013 AFL Under 18 Championships, where he was mentored by fellow backman and then-West Coast captain Darren Glass. He recorded an Australian Tertiary Admission Rank above 98 and contemplated attending university to study medicine.

== AFL career ==
Barrass was drafted by West Coast with pick 43 of the 2013 national draft, their third selection. On arrival at the club he expressed interest in eventually filling a leadership position. In January, prior to the 2014 AFL season, Barrass underwent an arthroscopy to repair a torn hip joint, ruling him out of training for three months. He returned in April to play his first game for East Perth reserves (West Coast's WAFL affiliate). Playing slightly over half the match, Barrass amassed 17 possessions. He played a further seven reserves games for the year.

Barrass made his WAFL senior debut against Peel Thunder in round 5 of the 2015 season, recording nine marks. Gavin Bell, West Coast's Head of Development, was impressed with Barrass's performance and noted his marking and ball use as standouts. Teammate Josh Hill likened him to fellow defender Jeremy McGovern for his intercept marking and ability to "read" the play, a comparison later echoed by teammate Mark LeCras. In July, coach Adam Simpson said Barrass was ready to play at AFL level, but noted the backline was "pretty settled" and it would be hard for the defender to claim a spot. After McGovern hurt his left hamstring against Collingwood, Barrass replaced him in the senior side against Sydney in round 17 of the 2015 AFL season. On debut, he recorded 15 disposals and five marks. Simpson was happy with Barrass's performance, saying "it's good to get exposure in such a big game", and noted the side's scarcity of key defenders after Will Schofield injured his calf. Fellow backman Xavier Ellis praised his efforts to play on dual Brownlow medallist Adam Goodes. Barrass played two more matches to end the year; round 18 versus Gold Coast and round 22 against Adelaide.

Barrass missed the first half of the 2016 AFL season but replaced Eric Mackenzie in round 12 after the defender fell ill. In July he was named as one of West Coast's key players under 23 by AFL.com.au journalist Alex Malcolm. He retained his spot for the majority of the second half of the season, culminating in a 2016 AFL Rising Star nomination after a twenty-nine point win against Adelaide in round 23. Barrass recorded seventeen disposals at 94.1% efficiency, ten spoils and ten marks, six of them interceptions. He polled one Brownlow vote for the performance. Barrass said he had been galvanised by his previous match against Adelaide in 2015, when he had been outplayed by their forwards. He went on to play in his first AFL finals series, but only managed an elimination final after West Coast were knocked out by the Western Bulldogs. Barrass had eleven disposals and took six marks; his performance was rated a 6 out of 10 by AFL.com.au journalist David Reed, who noted he improved after a slow start on Tom Boyd and took several crucial marks. Post-season, Barrass won West Coast's Rookie of the Year award.

Ahead of the 2017 AFL season, Fox Sports journalists Riley Beveridge and Ben Waterworth named Barrass 'the rising star' at West Coast and a 'lock' in their defence. He returned to pre-season training in improved condition after feeling 'pretty fat' near the conclusion of the 2016 season. Barrass signed a contract extension prior to the 2017 JLT Community Series, tying him to West Coast until the end of 2019. During pre-season training, Barrass fell awkwardly after a marking contest and was dazed for roughly a minute, but returned later in the week on a lighter program. After missing round 1, he played the next eight rounds of the season before being demoted to the WAFL after a poor performance against Essendon. Barrass returned against Geelong in round 13 and played the remaining games of the season, including the elimination and semi-finals.

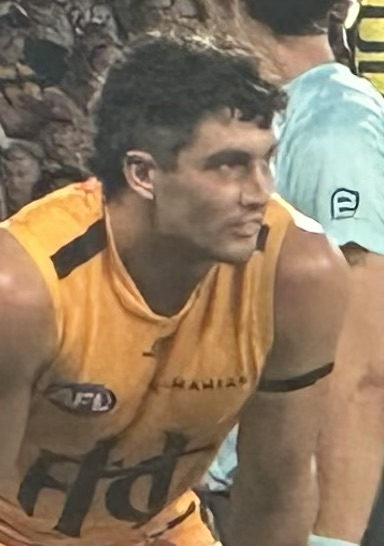
Barrass playing for Hawthorn during the 2025 AFL season

Barrass played on Sydney forward Lance Franklin in round 1 of the 2018 AFL season and conceded three goals in the opening term. West Coast captain Shannon Hurn was confident Barrass was not shaken by the experience. In June, during West Coast's round 12 bye, Barrass injured his back while using a dustpan and missed the next six rounds. He returned for West Coast's finals campaign and played on Mason Cox in the qualifying final. Cox did not score and was restricted to four kicks and two marks. In the grand final, Barrass again played on Cox; the match-up was named one of three key match-ups for the grand final by Terry Wallace prior to the game. Barrass outplayed Cox to half-time, restricting him to just one possession. However, Cox improved in the second half and finished with seven marks and two goals, while Barrass recorded ten marks and 17 disposals. Barrass signed a contract extension until the end of 2022 after the grand final. He was ranked as 'elite' (in the top ten percent of defenders) by Champion Data ahead of the 2019 AFL season.

Barrass kicked the first goal of his AFL career in the first round of the 2022 season, his 100th game.

Following the 2024 AFL season, Barrass requested a trade to Hawthorn. He was officially traded on 16 October, the last day of trade period. He has since become one of their most important players. In Round 7 of the 2026 AFL season, Barrass kicked his second career goal against the Gold Coast Suns after receiving a 50-metre penalty against Jamarra Ugle-Hagan.

== Statistics ==
Updated to the end of 2026.

Legend
G	Goals	K	Kicks	D	Disposals	T	Tackles
B	Behinds	H	Handballs	M	Marks
#	Played in that season's premiership team

Season	Team	No.	Games	Totals							Averages (per game)							Votes
Season	Team	No.	Games	G	B	K	H	D	M	T	G	B	K	H	D	M	T	Votes
2015	West Coast	37	3	0	0	22	15	37	17	2	0.0	0.0	7.3	5.0	12.3	5.7	0.7	0
2016	West Coast	37	10	0	0	69	46	115	49	13	0.0	0.0	6.9	4.6	11.5	4.9	1.3	1
2017	West Coast	37	19	0	1	164	91	255	121	21	0.0	0.1	8.6	4.8	13.4	6.4	1.1	0
2018^{#}	West Coast	37	19	0	0	193	49	242	124	15	0.0	0.0	10.2	2.6	12.7	6.5	0.8	0
2019	West Coast	37	14	0	0	131	30	161	86	11	0.0	0.0	9.4	2.1	11.5	6.1	0.8	0
2020 (Note: The 2020 season was played with 17 home-and-away matches per team (down from 22) and 16-minute quarters with time on (down from 20-minute quarters with time on) due to the impact of the COVID-19 pandemic.)	West Coast	37	18	0	0	144	37	181	94	4	0.0	0.0	8.0	2.1	10.1	5.2	0.2	3
2021	West Coast	37	16	0	0	168	53	221	117	10	0.0	0.0	10.5	3.3	13.8	7.3	0.6	1
2022	West Coast	37	19	1	0	210	85	295	145	14	0.1	0.0	11.1	4.5	15.5	7.6	0.7	0
2023	West Coast	37	14	0	0	115	66	181	93	6	0.0	0.0	8.2	4.7	12.9	6.6	0.4	0
2024	West Coast	37	18	0	0	169	72	241	123	14	0.0	0.0	9.4	4.0	13.4	6.8	0.8	0
2025	Hawthorn	37	25	0	0	142	100	242	94	28	0.0	0.0	5.7	4.0	9.7	3.8	1.1	0
2026	Hawthorn	37	21	1	0	116	69	185	84	23	0.1	0.0	5.5	3.3	8.8	4.0	1.1	1
Career			196	2	1	1643	713	2356	1147	161	0.0	0.0	8.4	3.6	12.0	5.9	0.8	6

== Honours and achievements ==
Team

- AFL premiership player (West Coast): 2018

Individual

- John Worsfold Medal: 2022
- AFL Rising Star nominee: 2016
