= Will Schofield =

Australian rules footballer (born 1989)

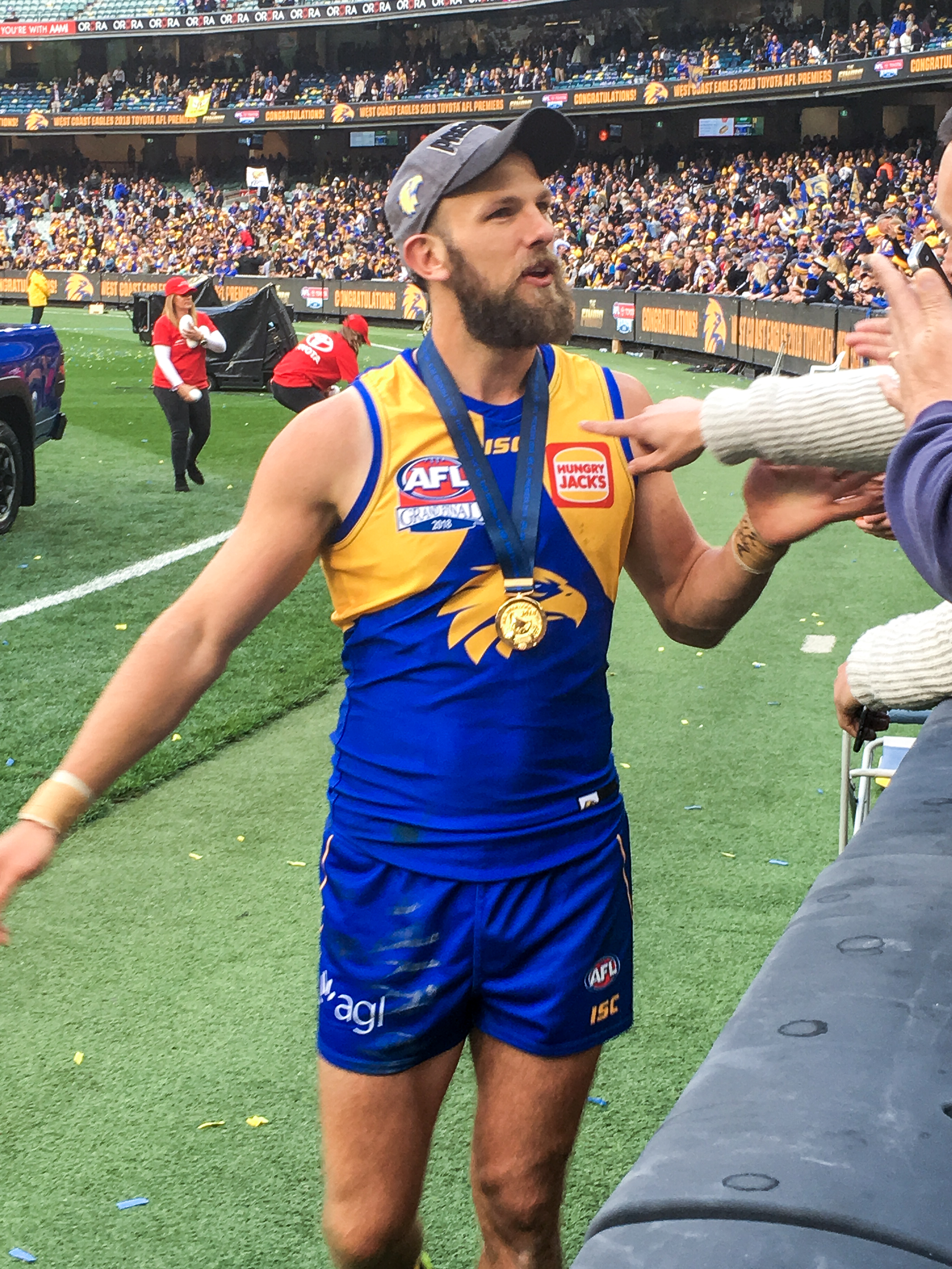
- Schofield after the 2018 AFL Grand Final

Personal information
- Full name: William John Schofield
- Nicknames: Schoey, Scuzza
- Born: 24 January 1989 (age 37)
- Original team: Geelong Falcons (TAC Cup)/Geelong College (APS)/Newtown & Chilwell
- Draft: No. 50, 2006 national draft
- Height: 196 cm (6 ft 5 in)
- Weight: 92 kg (203 lb)
- Position: Defender

Playing career^{1}
Years	Club	Games (Goals)
2007–2020	West Coast	194 (22)
- ^{1} Playing statistics correct to the end of round 18 2020.

Career highlights
- West Coast life membership: 2016; AFL premiership player: 2018

William John Schofield (born 24 January 1989) is a former Australian rules footballer who played for the West Coast Eagles in the Australian Football League (AFL). At 196 centimetres (6 ft 5 in) tall and weighing 92 kilograms (203 lb), he was a versatile defender who played key-position and half-back roles throughout his career. West Coast drafted him from the Geelong Falcons with pick 50 in the 2006 national draft, and debuted in round 17 of the 2007 AFL season. Schofield played in two AFL Grand Finals: a loss in 2015 and a victory in 2018. He achieved life membership at West Coast in 2016 after playing 150 games for the club. He retired following the 2020 season.

In April 2023, Schofield came out of retirement to assist the Eagles in the West Australian Football League (WAFL) due to a club injury crisis.

== Junior career ==
Originally from Geelong, Victoria, Schofield played junior football for Newtown & Chilwell Football Club, Geelong College in the Associated Public Schools of Victoria (APS) competition, and the Geelong Falcons in the TAC Cup. He was named in Geelong College's 2001–2010 Team of the Decade at full back. Schofield was also a strong track athlete in his youth, and was invited to participate internationally on a scholarship.

== AFL career ==
=== 2007–2013: Early career ===
Schofield was drafted by West Coast with the 50th pick overall in the 2006 national draft, and made his senior debut for West Coast in round 17 of the 2007 season against the Western Bulldogs at Docklands Stadium. From 2007 to 2009, Schofield usually represented Peel Thunder in the West Australian Football League (WAFL), playing 41 WAFL matches over the three seasons. In the same period, he played 15 AFL matches. In 2010, Schofield began to play more often in the AFL, reaching 20 games in a season for the first time in his career. He played 12 of the first 13 matches in the 2011 AFL season, signing a two-year contract extension (to the end of 2013) in the middle of the year. Schofield polled one vote in the 2011 Brownlow Medal; as of 2018 he has not polled another in his career. Schofield finished the season with 23 games, followed by a 20-game season in 2012.

Schofield played 16 matches in the 2013 AFL season, averaging 7.8 kicks, 4.3 handballs and marks, and 2.2 tackles per game. 2013 was also the first season Schofield played for East Perth in the WAFL as part of the West Coast–East Perth alignment. Notable games from his AFL season included a 14-disposal, nine-mark, three-tackle effort against the Western Bulldogs in round 6; a round 16 Western Derby where he amassed six marks, 17 disposals, two goals and seven hit-outs; and a round 19 match against Gold Coast where he recorded four tackles, five marks, two goals and 14 disposals. In round 8, Schofield overcame a compound dislocation of his finger to play out the final quarter of the match: coach John Worsfold praised his efforts and estimated he would miss "a couple of weeks" after surgery.

=== 2014–2018: Grand final success ===
In the 2014 AFL season, Schofield played 14 AFL matches and three WAFL matches. Going into the 2015 AFL season, he increased his size by four kilograms to improve his play against larger opponents, encouraged by coach Adam Simpson. He missed the last game of the NAB Challenge and round 1 of the home-and-away season after hurting his ankle. Key defenders Eric Mackenzie and Mitch Brown suffered serious knee injuries in the NAB Challenge and round 1 respectively, forcing Schofield to play as a key defender rather than a running half-back. In round 12, playing against Richmond, he injured his glute late in the game. Simpson was unable to estimate how many weeks he would miss. Schofield suffered another injury, this time to his calf, against Sydney in round 17. He was substituted at the end of the third quarter. Simpson was unsure whether Schofield's calf was strained or merely corked. After playing in a draw against Gold Coast – the first of his professional career – Schofield said he liked extra time and golden point systems present in other sports and suggested it would be interesting to implement them in the AFL. In the grand final against Hawthorn, he recorded 12 disposals and three marks. Schofield commented that Hawthorn "were just way too good" and "it took us too long to get into gear", but said the loss would be a "driving force" over the pre-season.

In early 2016, Schofield signed a three-year contract extension with West Coast (until the end of 2019). During the 2016 AFL season, he achieved life membership at West Coast after playing 150 games for the club. Schofield played 22 AFL games for the year. In 2017, Schofield was a "sporadic pick" for the senior side. During half-time in a match against Melbourne, Schofield was reported by umpire Brett Rosebury for striking after knocking Clayton Oliver on the chin with his elbow. He was offered a one-match suspension by the AFL Tribunal as the strike was graded as intentional with low impact. The charge was successfully challenged and the impact was downgraded to negligible. However, Schofield still missed a match against the Western Bulldogs due to a hip injury. Overall, he played 10 games for the 2017 season.

Before the 2018 AFL season, Schofield lost weight in an attempt to increase his versatility. He anticipated pressure on his backline spot from other West Coast defenders, but said he would use it as motivation. He impressed in a WAFL match against Perth in April, recording 18 disposals and nine rebounds from half-back. A month later, he injured his hamstring halfway through the first quarter in a loss to South Fremantle and could not play out the match. After returning to the AFL, he suffered another hamstring injury against Fremantle in the first quarter, and did not return to the field after receiving treatment. Schofield was expected to miss two matches after scans revealed a minor strain. After returning against Brisbane, Schofield's place in the backline was under pressure in the lead-up to West Coast's first final as Lewis Jetta returned from a calf injury. He was dropped from the side, but returned in the preliminary final after Brad Sheppard injured his hamstring. Schofield commented, "To be left out was really disappointing, but I pretty quickly came to the realisation that it wasn't the end of the season." Fellow defender Tom Barrass praised Schofield's mindset and was confident he would be able to cover the loss of Sheppard in the grand final. In the grand final, Schofield played on Collingwood forward Jordan De Goey and won several one-on-one match-ups at critical moments. He played all possible time on field, becoming the sixth West Coast player to do so in a grand final. Schofield said post-match he had been nervous about playing on De Goey, but said it was part of his defensive role and he had tried his best. At the conclusion of the WAFL season, Schofield polled one vote in the 2018 Sandover Medal.

=== 2020: Final season ===
Schofield played four games for the Eagles in 2020 and retired from the AFL at the conclusion of the season.

=== 2023: Return to the WAFL ===
In April 2023, Schofield came out of retirement to assist the Eagles in the West Australian Football League (WAFL) due to a club injury crisis.

== Personal life ==
Schofield has two brothers: Romney and Jason. His mother is Jan Schofield; his father John Schofield died in 2012. He has a wife, Alex, and a son named Nash.

In 2013, Schofield was attacked while in Geelong after a round 22 loss to Collingwood. He suffered a broken cheek and serious bruising to the face, causing him to withdraw from the last match of the season. A man pleaded guilty to the unprovoked assault in the Geelong Magistrates Court.

== Statistics ==
Correct to the end of the 2020 AFL season.

Legend
G	Goals	K	Kicks	D	Disposals	T	Tackles
B	Behinds	H	Handballs	M	Marks

Season	Team	No.	Games	Totals							Averages (per game)						
Season	Team	No.	Games	G	B	K	H	D	M	T	G	B	K	H	D	M	T
2007	West Coast	31	3	0	1	15	5	20	9	7	0	0.3	5.0	1.7	6.7	3.0	2.3
2008	West Coast	31	9	1	0	48	33	81	32	16	0.1	0	5.3	3.7	9.0	3.6	1.8
2009	West Coast	31	3	0	1	15	10	25	9	6	0	0.3	5.0	3.3	8.3	3.0	2.0
2010	West Coast	31	20	1	3	125	102	227	63	39	0.1	0.2	6.3	5.1	11.4	3.2	2.0
2011	West Coast	31	23	2	4	154	109	263	91	47	0.1	0.2	6.7	4.7	11.4	4.0	2.0
2012	West Coast	31	20	8	7	166	98	264	106	35	0.4	0.4	8.3	4.9	13.2	5.3	1.8
2013	West Coast	31	16	7	4	124	69	193	69	35	0.4	0.3	7.8	4.3	12.1	4.3	2.2
2014	West Coast	31	17	0	0	126	67	193	61	29	0	0	7.4	3.9	11.4	3.6	1.7
2015	West Coast	31	21	0	0	153	89	242	100	25	0	0	7.3	4.2	11.5	4.8	1.2
2016	West Coast	31	22	1	1	127	83	210	88	43	0.1	0.1	5.8	3.8	9.6	4.0	2.0
2017	West Coast	31	10	2	0	47	44	91	24	16	0.2	0	4.7	4.4	9.1	2.4	1.6
2018†	West Coast	31	12	0	0	64	28	92	40	16	0	0	5.3	2.3	7.7	3.3	1.3
2019	West Coast	31	14	0	0	80	37	117	48	22	0	0	5.7	2.6	8.3	3.4	1.5
2020	West Coast	31	4	0	0	12	10	22	3	8	0	0	3	2.5	5.5	0.7	2
Career			194	22	21	1256	743	2040	743	344	0.11	0.11	6.47	3.83	10.52	6.47	0.47
