= 2015 AFL Rising Star =

Australian rules football award

2015 NAB AFL Rising Star
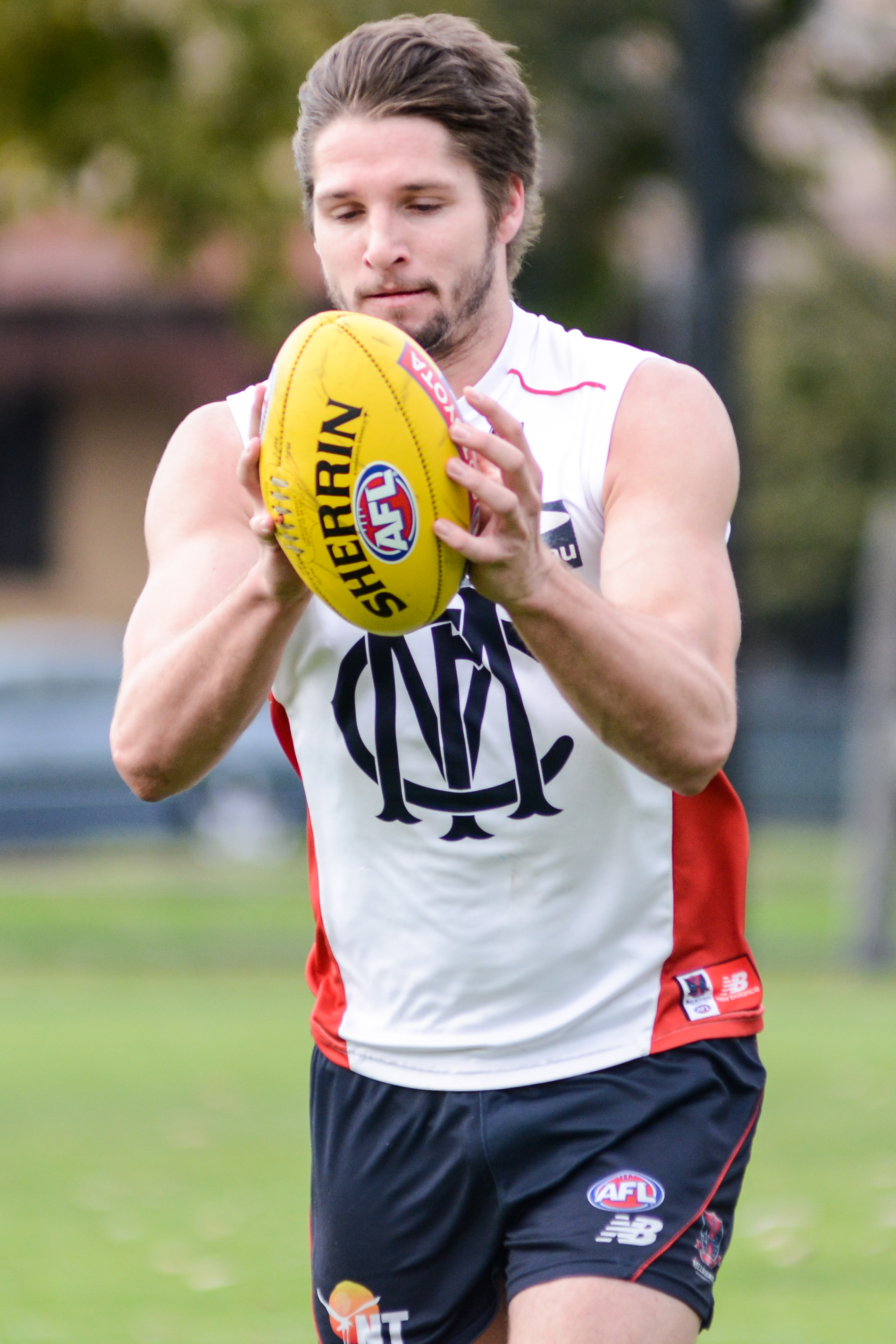
- Jesse Hogan, winner of the 2015 Rising Star, at training in July 2015
- Sponsored by: National Australia Bank
- Date: 9 September
- Country: Australia
- Ron Evans medallist: Jesse Hogan (Melbourne)

The NAB AFL Rising Star award is given annually to a stand out young player in the Australian Football League. The award was won by Jesse Hogan of Melbourne who polled 49 votes, beating Carlton's Patrick Cripps who finished on 41 votes.

== Eligibility ==
Every round, an Australian Football League rising star nomination is given to a stand out young player. To be eligible for nomination, a player must be under 21 on 1 January of that year and have played 10 or fewer senior games before the start of the season; a player who is suspended may be nominated, but is not eligible to win the award. At the end of the year, one of the 23 nominees is the winner of award.

== Nominations ==
Round	Player	Club	Ref.
1	Kamdyn McIntosh	Richmond	
2	Mitch Honeychurch	Western Bulldogs	
3	Isaac Heeney	Sydney	
4	Patrick Cripps	Carlton	
5	Adam Saad	Gold Coast	
6	Cory Gregson	Geelong	
7	Billy Hartung	Hawthorn	
8	Cam McCarthy	Greater Western Sydney	
9	Jesse Hogan	Melbourne	
10	Angus Brayshaw	Melbourne	
11	Tim Broomhead	Collingwood	
12	Tom Boyd	Western Bulldogs	
13	Charlie Cameron	Adelaide	
14	Jack Lonie	St Kilda	
15	Dom Sheed	West Coast	
16	Touk Miller	Gold Coast	
17	Jake Lever	Adelaide	
18	Harris Andrews	Brisbane Lions	
19	Jackson Thurlow	Geelong	
20	Jordan De Goey	Collingwood	
21	Darcy Lang	Geelong	
22	Ben Lennon	Richmond	
23	Orazio Fantasia	Essendon	

== Final voting ==
	Player	Club	Votes
1	Jesse Hogan	Melbourne	49
2	Patrick Cripps	Carlton	41
3	Dom Sheed	West Coast	27
4	Isaac Heeney	Sydney	12
5	Angus Brayshaw	Melbourne	8
6	Touk Miller	Gold Coast	6
7	Adam Saad	Gold Coast	3
8	Jake Lever	Adelaide	2
9	Jordan De Goey	Collingwood	1
9	Jackson Thurlow	Geelong	1
