= Mason Cox =

American-born Australian rules footballer (born 1991)

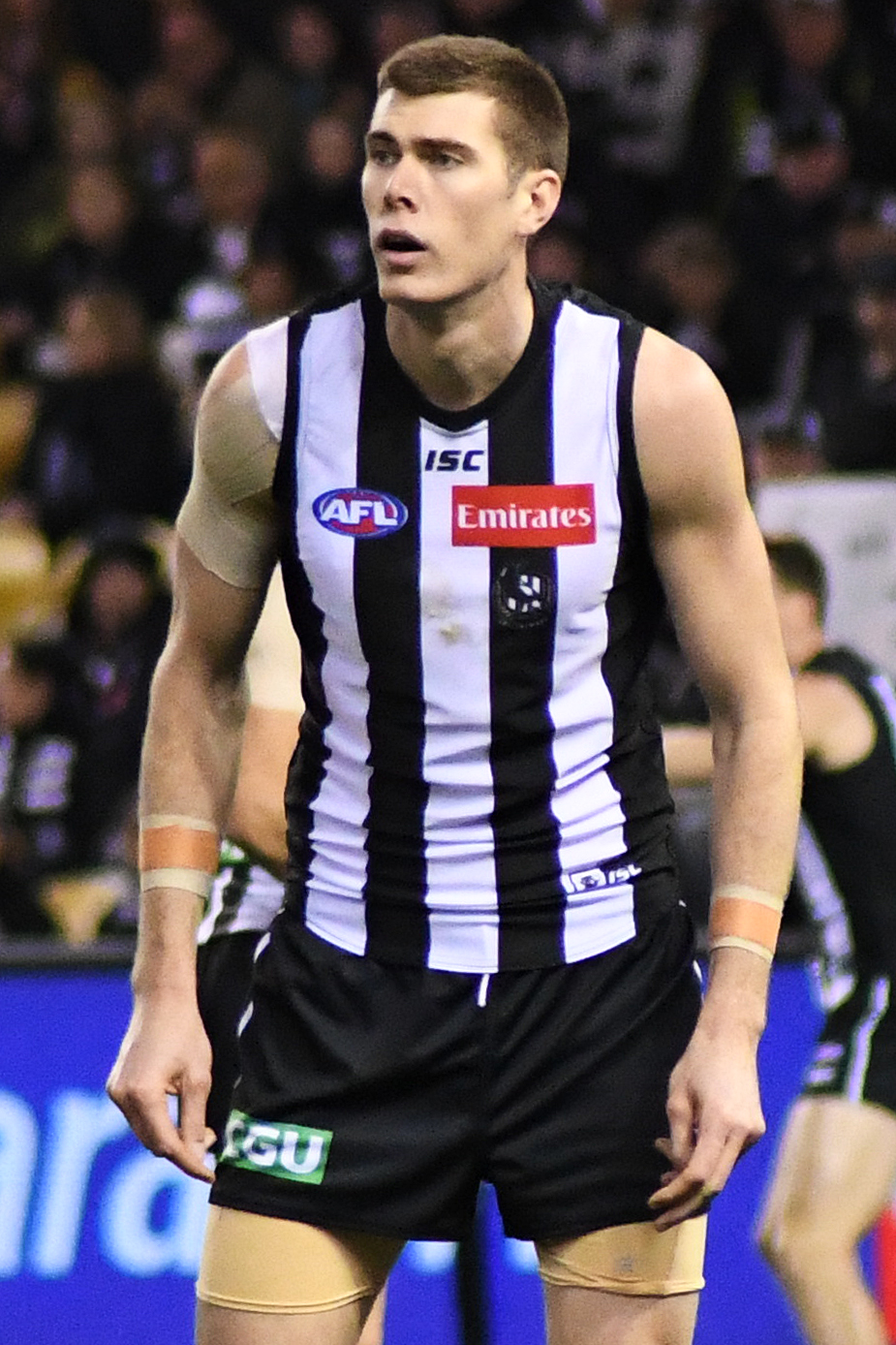
- Cox playing for Collingwood in August 2018

Personal information
- Full name: Mason Troy Cox
- Nicknames: Coxy, Coxzilla, American Pie
- Born: March 14, 1991 (age 35); Highland Village, Texas, U.S.
- Original team: Oklahoma State University (Big 12)
- Draft: No. 60 pick, 2015 rookie draft
- Height: 211 cm (6 ft 11 in)
- Weight: 110 kg (243 lb)
- Position: Key forward / ruckman

Club information
- Current club: Fremantle
- Number: 18

Playing career^{1}
Years	Club	Games (Goals)
2015–2025	Collingwood	139 (127)
2026–	Fremantle	20 (7)
Total		159 (134)
- ^{1} Playing statistics correct to the end of 2026.

Career highlights
- AFL premiership player: 2023; Neale Daniher Trophy (2018)

Mason Troy Cox (born March 14, 1991) is an American-born Australian professional Australian rules footballer who plays for the Fremantle Football Club in the Australian Football League (AFL). Playing as a ruckman and key forward, he first played Australian rules football in April 2014 before making his AFL debut for Collingwood two years later in April 2016. Cox previously played basketball for Oklahoma State University in the Big 12 Conference and, standing at 211 cm (6 ft 11 in), is the tallest player to ever be measured at an AFL Draft Combine.

== Early life ==
Cox was born in Highland Village, a suburb of Dallas, Texas, to parents Jeanette and Phil, the youngest of their three sons. Cox was a student at Edward S. Marcus High School in Flower Mound, Texas, and was part of the school's state championship-winning soccer team. One of his schoolmates and teammates in college was future Boston Celtics player Marcus Smart.

Cox studied engineering at Oklahoma State University, graduating in 2014. While studying, he started playing basketball as a hobby. He initially joined the Oklahoma State Cowgirls' "scout team" to simulate Brittney Griner, former Baylor University basketball player. After being noticed by former head coach Travis Ford, he was asked to join the Oklahoma State Cowboys basketball team as a walk-on. He played a total of 57 minutes for the Cowboys in 24 games over three seasons between 2011 and 2014, scoring seven points. One of his highlights while playing NCAA Division I basketball was shutting down future National Basketball Association MVP Joel Embiid while defending him.

== Recruitment and move to Australia ==
Cox was invited to attend the 2014 US International Combine for potential Australian rules footballers, in Los Angeles in April 2014 despite knowing very little at all about the sport. After impressive performances in the skills testing, he travelled to Australia for a second combine and on May 30, 2014, was signed by the Collingwood Football Club. AFL teams Port Adelaide, North Melbourne, Richmond, and Fremantle were also reported as having shown interest in recruiting Cox.

Collingwood selected Cox at pick 60 in the 2015 AFL rookie draft, and he joined the club's list as an international rookie.

== VFL career ==
Cox played for the Collingwood reserves team in the Victorian Football League (VFL) throughout the 2015 season while learning the game and improving his skills.

Cox became known for his goalkicking accuracy in the VFL. Cox shone in the 2016 NAB Challenge pre-season series showing his ability to compete at that level kicking 2 goals against Geelong, his ability to take contested marks and average a goal a game across both the VFL and AFL drew notice. Despite his strong showing at AFL level in the NAB Challenge, he was not elevated at the start of the season and returned to VFL level for the premiership season.

Cox played well in the opening two games of the 2016 VFL season, including a dominant performance up forward against Port Melbourne and as such earned a long-awaited call up to the AFL.

== AFL career ==
Cox made his AFL debut on April 25, 2016, in the annual Anzac Day match against Essendon. Within the first 80 seconds of the match, he took his first mark and scored the game's first goal with his first kick in the AFL. Collingwood went on to win the match by 69 points.

After the 2017 season, despite interest from other clubs, Cox signed a three-year contract extension, keeping him at Collingwood until the end of 2020. Cox continued his good form in the 2018 season, kicking a career-high five goals in the Queen's Birthday match at the MCG and was awarded the Neale Daniher trophy as best on ground.

In the 2018 Preliminary Final against Richmond, he played a man-of-the-match performance, kicking three goals consecutively and taking many contested marks; Bruce McAvaney remarked: "what has Collingwood unleashed?" when talking about Mason's performance.

In the 2018 Grand Final, he kicked two goals during the second half and took many contested marks while playing in Collingwood's loss. He also dominated in its one-point elimination final win against West Coast in the 2020 AFL finals series.

Cox received special dispensation from the AFL to wear prescription sunglasses in competition. Cox suffered a torn retina in one eye due to an accidental eye poke in a 2019 game against Gold Coast Suns and a detached retina in the other eye after an on-field altercation in the 2018 Grand Final. He has had six eye surgeries in his career. After the 2019 injury, Cox said he had to spend two weeks in bed in a darkened room for 45 minutes of each hour, calling it "probably the lowest moment of my life."

Cox appeared in a 60 Minutes interview in the United States in April 2023. In the interview, Cox explained how sections of the Collingwood crowd would chant "USA USA" whenever he had possession of the ball.

Against the GWS Giants in Round 9, 2023, his performance won praise, declared by some as a career-best, kicking two goals, including a set shot from outside the 50-metre arc.

In 2023, Cox became the second American-born AFL premiership player after Don Pyke in 1992 and 1994.

Cox was delisted from Collingwood at the end of the 2025 AFL season, after 139 matches for the club. In November 2025 in the Supplemental Selection Period after the 2025 AFL draft, Cox signed a two-year deal with the Fremantle Football Club.

Cox played in the 2026 Grand Final, which Fremantle lost to Brisbane by seven points. Cox had a limited role in the match, recording only two disposals and four hitouts, and playing just 32 percent of game time.

== Statistics ==
Updated to the end of the 2026 season.

Legend
G	Goals	K	Kicks	D	Disposals	T	Tackles
B	Behinds	H	Handballs	M	Marks	H/O	Hit-outs

Season	Team	No.	Games	Totals								Averages (per game)								Votes
Season	Team	No.	Games	G	B	K	H	D	M	T	H/O	G	B	K	H	D	M	T	H/O	Votes
2015	Collingwood	46	0	—	—	—	—	—	—	—	—	—	—	—	—	—	—	—	—	0
2016	Collingwood	46	11	17	7	50	32	82	30	24	79	1.5	0.6	4.5	2.9	7.5	2.7	2.2	7.2	1
2017	Collingwood	46	9	10	5	38	32	70	29	23	145	1.1	0.6	4.2	3.6	7.8	3.2	2.6	16.1	0
2018	Collingwood	46	24	25	12	148	89	237	119	38	164	1.0	0.5	6.2	3.7	9.9	5.0	1.6	6.8	3
2019	Collingwood	46	14	19	10	78	49	127	60	11	56	1.4	0.7	5.6	3.5	9.1	4.3	0.8	4.0	0
2020 (Note: The 2020 season was played with 17 home-and-away matches per team (down from 22) and 16-minute quarters with time on (down from 20-minute quarters with time on) due to the impact of the COVID-19 pandemic.)	Collingwood	46	11	14	2	38	31	69	35	6	34	1.3	0.2	3.5	2.8	6.3	3.2	0.5	3.1	0
2021	Collingwood	46	7	8	8	41	25	66	26	7	23	1.1	1.1	5.9	3.6	9.4	3.7	1.0	3.3	0
2022	Collingwood	46	18	7	8	112	40	152	58	36	317	0.4	0.4	6.2	2.2	8.4	3.2	2.0	17.6	1
2023^{#}	Collingwood	46	19	17	13	109	47	156	69	26	324	0.9	0.7	5.7	2.5	8.2	3.6	1.4	17.1	3
2024	Collingwood	46	16	6	6	69	51	120	46	30	237	0.4	0.4	4.3	3.2	7.5	2.9	1.9	14.8	0
2025	Collingwood	46	10	4	4	39	30	69	27	15	104	0.4	0.4	3.9	3.0	6.9	2.7	1.5	10.4	0
2026	Fremantle	18	20	7	9	81	48	129	46	24	280	0.4	0.5	4.1	2.4	6.5	2.3	1.2	14.0	0
Career			159	134	84	803	474	1277	545	240	1763	0.8	0.5	5.1	3.0	8.0	3.4	1.5	11.1	8

== Honours and achievements ==
Team

- AFL Premiership (Collingwood) – 2023
- 2× AFL minor premiership: (Collingwood) 2023, (Fremantle) 2026

Individual

- Neale Daniher Trophy: 2018

== Personal life ==
Cox's older brothers also now play Australian rules. Nolan played for the USAFL National Championships team Austin Crows and has also represented the USA Revolution national team. Austin plays for USAFL club the Seattle Grizzlies. Mason has expressed a keen interest in promoting the game at the grassroots level in the US, visiting the US to support his brothers at the USAFL National Championships.

In 2019, Cox was in a relationship with England netball international Geva Mentor.

Cox was seeking permanent resident status on a path towards Australian citizenship to fulfill his desire to live the rest of his life in Australia, committing to a multi-year contract at Collingwood. At the end of March 2020, he was accepted to become an Australian citizen. Cox became a citizen of Australia on June 22, 2022, at a special citizenship ceremony at the MCG along with over one hundred conferees. Cox later introduced his citizenship lawyer to Bryce Cotton, an American basketball player who obtained Australian citizenship in 2025 after years of turmoil.
