= Taylor Adams =

Australian rules footballer (born 1993)

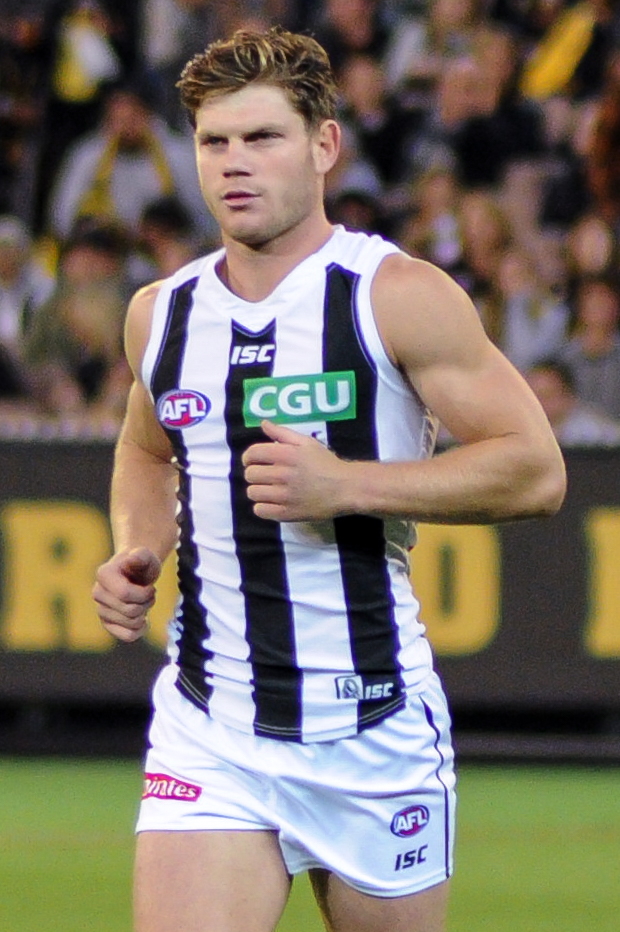
- Adams playing for Collingwood in 2017

Personal information
- Full name: Taylor James Adams
- Born: 20 September 1993 (age 33); Mount Duneed, Victoria
- Original team: Geelong Falcons (TAC Cup)/St Joseph's
- Draft: No. 13, 2011 national draft
- Height: 181 cm (5 ft 11 in)
- Weight: 83 kg (183 lb)
- Position: Midfielder

Playing career
Years	Club	Games (Goals)
2012–2013	Greater Western Sydney	31 (12)
2014–2023	Collingwood	175 (64)
2024–2026	Sydney	23 (10)
Total		229 (86)

Career highlights
- All-Australian: 2020; Copeland Trophy: 2020

Taylor Adams (born 20 September 1993) is a former Australian rules footballer who played for the Sydney Swans in the Australian Football League (AFL). He previously played for the Greater Western Sydney Giants from 2012 to 2013 and the Collingwood Football Club from 2014 to 2023.

== State football ==
Adams started out playing Australian rules football at St Joseph's, at under-14 and under-16 levels, before joining the Geelong Falcons in the TAC Cup. He served as a captain for Geelong Falcons, and the opportunities and responsibilities helped shape him and he thanked the club during his first Australian Football League (AFL) season. Adams represented Vic County in the 2011 AFL Under 18 Championships and was selected for the All-Australian Team after averaging 18.8 possessions over 4 games. He later had an impressive performance at the AFL Draft Combine, finishing in the top 10 on the beep test.

== AFL career ==
=== Greater Western Sydney (2012–2013) ===
Adams was drafted by the Greater Western Sydney Giants with pick 13 in the 2011 national draft. He made his debut in round 5 of the 2012 season, against Western Bulldogs at Manuka Oval, kicking a goal, taking five marks, and having seven kicks, 10 handballs, 17 disposals, and three tackles.

=== Collingwood (2014–2023) ===
In October 2013, Adams was traded to Collingwood, as a swap for Heath Shaw. He made his debut for Collingwood in the opening round of the 2014 season, against Fremantle. After joining the club, at the beginning the pressure and large crowds affected him, leading to him performing poorly until team-mate Ben Johnson advised him to chill, leading to him playing better football. In round 8 of the 2015 season, Adams played his 50th AFL game. Ahead of the 2016 season, Adams joined Collingwood's leadership group. Ahead of the 2017 season Adams was appointed vice-captain alongside Steele Sidebottom, before being selected only for the leadership group in 2018 and 2019, returning to vice-captaincy ahead of the 2020 season. In the third round of the 2018 season, Adams played his 100th AFL game against Carlton. At the end of the season he was awarded Collingwood's Bob Rose award for being the Best Finals' Player, after averaging 29 possessions, five clearances, and seven tackles over four games. He was a standout player in the Grand Final, with 31 possessions, nine clearances, and a goal, leading to him being voted the runner-up for the Norm Smith Medal, which was won by West Coast player Luke Shuey. In July 2019, Adams signed a five-year contract extension. In September 2022 Adams tore his groin off the bone.

=== Sydney Swans (2024–2026) ===
After missing the 2023 Collingwood premiership side due to a hamstring injury, Adams requested a trade to Sydney in pursuit of more time in the midfield. He was traded on 11 October.

Adams only played 23 games in three seasons for Sydney, due to a horror run of injuries including soft-tissue problems. He retired in June 2026 effective immediately.

== Personal life ==
Taylor grew up in Mount Duneed just outside the coastal town of Torquay in Victoria. He attended Christian College in Geelong. He came from a Geelong-supporting family, including his father and grandmother.

Adams is currently studying a Graduate Certificate of Business Administration at Deakin University.

=== Charges and arrests ===
In April 2012, Adams was charged with assault after an altercation at a bar in Geelong which happened in January. In January 2015, he was arrested and charged for being drunk in public after a fight at a Geelong bar.

== Statistics ==
Legend
G	Goals	K	Kicks	D	Disposals	T	Tackles
B	Behinds	H	Handballs	M	Marks

Season	Team	No.	Games	Totals							Averages (per game)							Votes
Season	Team	No.	Games	G	B	K	H	D	M	T	G	B	K	H	D	M	T	Votes
2012	Greater Western Sydney	30	15	5	1	167	131	298	51	53	0.3	0.1	11.1	8.7	19.9	3.4	3.5	0
2013	Greater Western Sydney	11	16	7	6	209	132	341	69	52	0.4	0.4	13.1	8.3	21.3	4.3	3.3	0
2014	Collingwood	13	12	2	3	114	116	230	34	43	0.2	0.3	9.5	9.7	19.2	2.8	3.6	0
2015	Collingwood	13	18	7	6	254	240	494	79	90	0.4	0.3	14.1	13.3	27.4	4.4	5.0	8
2016	Collingwood	13	14	6	1	212	176	388	64	62	0.4	0.1	15.1	12.6	27.7	4.6	4.4	5
2017	Collingwood	13	22	9	8	328	321	649	111	140	0.4	0.4	14.9	14.6	29.5	5.0	6.4	14
2018	Collingwood	13	23	9	9	330	290	620	78	120	0.4	0.4	14.3	12.6	27.0	3.4	5.2	6
2019	Collingwood	13	12	5	5	174	119	293	47	61	0.4	0.4	14.5	9.9	24.4	3.9	5.1	0
2020 (Note: The 2020 season was played with 17 home-and-away matches per team (down from 22) and 16-minute quarters with time on (down from 20-minute quarters with time on) due to the impact of the COVID-19 pandemic.)	Collingwood	13	19	9	2	245	186	431	63	104	0.5	0.1	12.9	9.8	22.7	3.3	5.5	11
2021	Collingwood	13	14	2	2	195	187	382	46	78	0.1	0.1	13.9	13.4	27.3	3.3	5.6	5
2022	Collingwood	13	18	2	6	194	206	400	48	91	0.1	0.3	10.8	11.4	22.2	2.7	5.1	2
2023	Collingwood	13	23	13	11	222	202	424	78	105	0.6	0.5	9.7	8.8	18.4	3.4	4.6	5
2024	Sydney	3	19	9	6	159	167	326	57	68	0.5	0.3	8.4	8.8	17.2	3.0	3.6	0
2025	Sydney	3	4	1	0	15	22	37	6	11	0.3	0.0	3.8	5.5	9.3	1.5	2.8	0
Career			229	86	66	2818	2495	5313	831	1078	0.4	0.3	12.3	10.9	23.2	3.6	4.7	56

== Honours and achievements ==
Team

- Minor Premiership 2023 (Collingwood), 2024 (Sydney Swans)

Individual

- Copeland Trophy: 2020
- All-Australian team: 2020
