= Jack Crisp =

Australian rules footballer

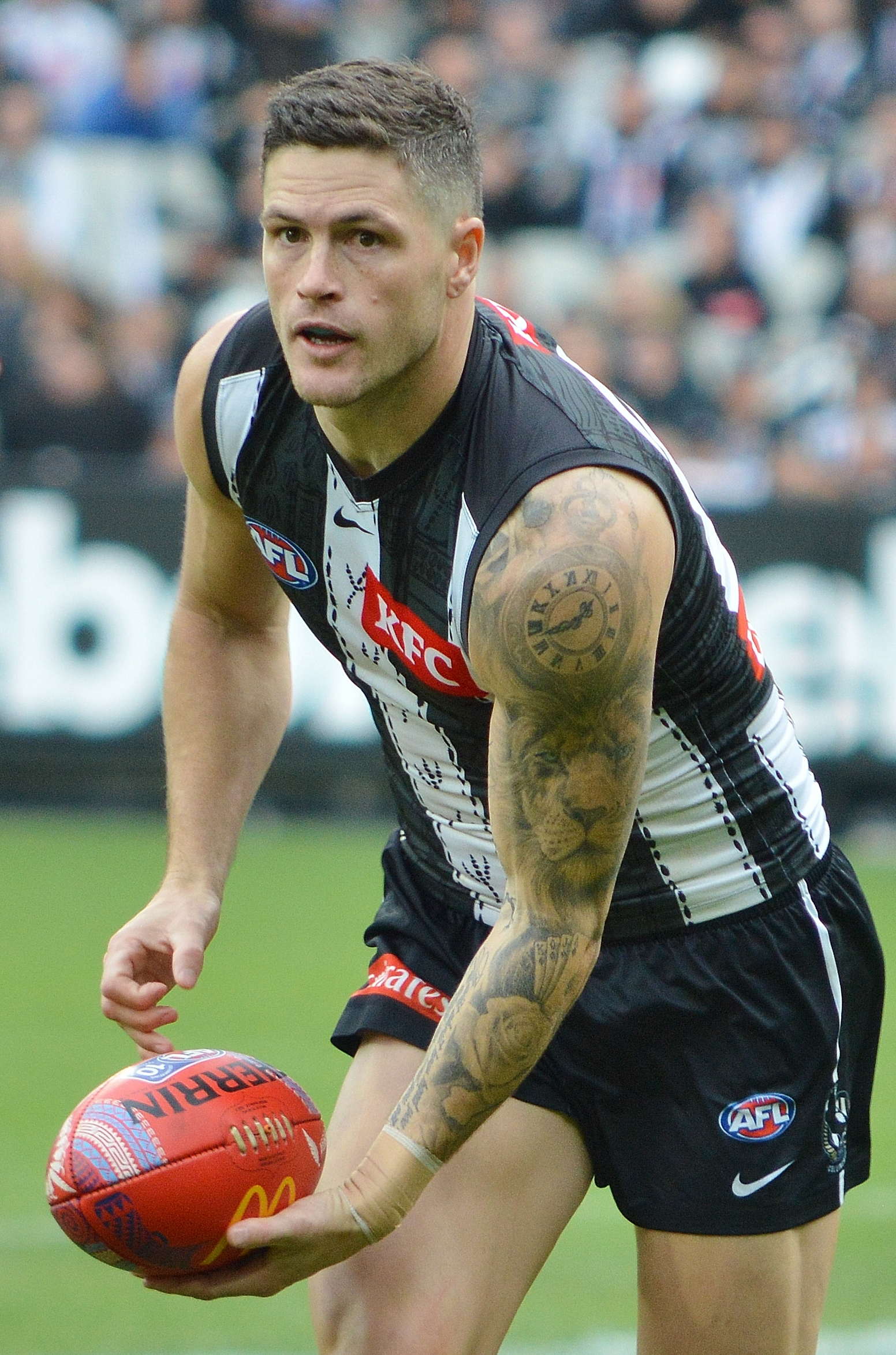
- Crisp in May 2025

Personal information
- Full name: Jack Crisp
- Nicknames: Crispy, Steak Knives
- Born: 2 October 1993 (age 33)
- Original teams: Myrtleford, Murray Bushrangers (TAC Cup)
- Draft: No. 40, 2012 rookie draft
- Height: 190 cm (6 ft 3 in)
- Weight: 92 kg (203 lb)
- Position: Midfielder

Club information
- Current club: Collingwood
- Number: 25

Playing career^{1}
Years	Club	Games (Goals)
2012–2014	Brisbane Lions	18 (10)
2015–	Collingwood	280 (92)
Total		298 (102)
- ^{1} Playing statistics correct to the end of the 2026 season.

Career highlights
- AFL premiership player: 2023; 2x Copeland Trophy: 2021, 2022; Neale Daniher Trophy: 2024; Collingwood life member: 2024; Most consecutive AFL games played (ongoing); 2x NEAFL premiership player: 2012, 2013

Jack Crisp (born 2 October 1993) is a professional Australian rules football player, currently playing for the Collingwood Football Club in the Australian Football League (AFL). He previously played for the Brisbane Lions from 2012 to 2014. He holds the record for the most consecutive games played in VFL/AFL history, having played 286 consecutive games and counting as of the conclusion of the 2026 AFL season; In 2025, he broke the previous record of 244 consecutive games set by Jim Stynes in 1998.

== Playing career ==
Crisp participated in the Auskick program at Myrtleford, Victoria, and played his junior football with Myrtleford in the Wangaratta & District Junior Football League prior to playing with the Murray Bushrangers in the Under 18 TAC Cup, where he won their 2011 club best and fairest award.

=== Brisbane Lions ===
He was recruited with pick number forty in the 2012 Rookie Draft, following in the footsteps of fellow Murray Bushranger Tom Rockliff in playing for the Brisbane Lions. He made his debut for the Brisbane Lions in Round 4, 2012, against Gold Coast in QClash 3.

=== Collingwood ===
Crisp was traded to Collingwood along with picks 5 and 25 for Dayne Beams prior to the 2014 AFL draft. Crisp made his debut for the club in their first-round clash with his previous side, Brisbane. He held his spot in the Collingwood line-up for the rest of the season, where he played all 22 games for the club. He was rewarded for his efforts that year by polling 3rd in the Copeland Trophy (a rank that earned him the J.J. Joyce Trophy) and earning the Gavin Brown Award for leading the so-called "Desire Indicators". He would continue this impressive form throughout 2019 and the COVID-19-affected season 2020, playing all games in his entire stint at Collingwood.

As alluded to, Crisp has proven to be an especially consistent and durable player throughout his time at Collingwood; as of the end of Round 8, 2025, Crisp has played 245 consecutive AFL games, which is a Collingwood record in the AFL era (i.e., 1990 onwards), although six of those games were played with Brisbane. More significantly, the game streak stands as a record for any player in the AFL's history.

Crisp won his first E.W. Copeland Trophy after being named Collingwood's 2021 club champion with 90 votes ahead of Brayden Maynard (70 votes) and Scott Pendlebury (67 votes).

In the 10th round of the 2023 AFL season, Crisp played his 192nd consecutive match for the club, breaking Jock McHale's record from 1917.

Crisp played his record-breaking 245th consecutive match against Geelong in Round 8, 2025. He had a shot at goal after the final siren to win the match for Collingwood, but kicked a behind.

== Controversy ==
In 2015, Crisp was found guilty of betting offences after he placed $129 worth of bets on AFL in 2014. Crisp was fined $5,000 over the offences.

In 2023, historical Snapchat photos and video footage dating back to 2018 was leaked and went viral online. The video contained sexually explicit material as well as implying that Crisp was using illegal drugs. The incident was investigated by the AFL Integrity Unit, which, after factoring in Crisp's apology and the behaviour in the years afterwards, ordered Crisp to take an education program and considered the matter finalised.

== Statistics ==
Updated to the end of round 22, 2026.

Legend
G	Goals	K	Kicks	D	Disposals	T	Tackles
B	Behinds	H	Handballs	M	Marks
#	Played in that season's premiership team

Season	Team	No.	Games	Totals							Averages (per game)							Votes
Season	Team	No.	Games	G	B	K	H	D	M	T	G	B	K	H	D	M	T	Votes
2012	Brisbane Lions	47	10	3	5	57	57	114	21	34	0.3	0.5	5.7	5.7	11.4	2.1	3.4	0
2013	Brisbane Lions	47	2	1	1	11	4	15	5	9	0.5	0.5	5.5	2.0	7.5	2.5	4.5	0
2014	Brisbane Lions	5	6	6	6	63	50	113	35	17	1.0	1.0	10.5	8.3	18.8	5.8	2.8	0
2015	Collingwood	25	22	16	10	282	202	484	85	106	0.7	0.5	12.8	9.2	22.0	3.9	4.8	4
2016	Collingwood	25	22	9	12	202	243	445	66	128	0.4	0.5	9.2	11.0	20.2	3.0	5.8	0
2017	Collingwood	25	22	6	7	249	224	473	122	89	0.3	0.3	11.3	10.2	21.5	5.5	4.0	0
2018	Collingwood	25	26	4	3	337	264	601	136	86	0.2	0.1	13.0	10.2	23.1	5.2	3.3	0
2019	Collingwood	25	24	2	5	345	269	614	148	83	0.1	0.2	14.4	11.2	25.6	6.2	3.5	1
2020 (Note: The 2020 season was played with 17 home-and-away matches per team (down from 22) and 16-minute quarters with time on (down from 20-minute quarters with time on) due to the impact of the COVID-19 pandemic.)	Collingwood	25	19	2	2	220	143	363	91	58	0.1	0.1	11.6	7.5	19.1	4.8	3.1	5
2021	Collingwood	25	22	2	5	341	253	594	148	80	0.1	0.2	15.5	11.5	27.0	6.7	3.6	11
2022	Collingwood	25	25	12	8	315	280	595	101	137	0.5	0.3	12.6	11.2	23.8	4.0	5.5	11
2023^{#}	Collingwood	25	26	10	8	294	261	555	98	114	0.4	0.3	11.3	10.0	21.3	3.8	4.4	2
2024	Collingwood	25	23	14	8	240	227	467	65	124	0.6	0.3	10.4	9.9	20.3	2.8	5.4	5
2025	Collingwood	25	25	9	7	285	216	501	106	129	0.4	0.3	11.4	8.6	20.0	4.2	5.2	3
2026	Collingwood	25	21	5	6	224	220	444	106	86	0.2	0.3	10.7	10.5	21.1	5.0	4.1	0
Career			295	101	93	3465	2913	6378	1333	1280	0.3	0.3	11.7	9.9	21.6	4.5	4.3	42

== Honours and achievements ==
Team

- AFL Premiership player (Collingwood) 2023
- AFL minor premiership: (Collingwood) 2023

Individual

- 2× Copeland Trophy: 2021, 2022
