= 2013 AFL Under 18 Championships =

Youth Australian rules football competition

- Teams: 8

Division 1
- Teams: 4
- Champions: South Australia
- Larke Medal: Dom Sheed

Division 2
- Teams: 4
- Champions: Tasmania
- Hunter Harrison Medal: Liam Dawson; Kade Kolodjashnij; Toby Nankervis

The 2013 NAB AFL Under 18 Championships was the 18th edition of the AFL Under 18 Championships. Eight teams competed in the championships: Vic Metro, Vic Country, South Australia and Western Australia in Division 1, and New South Wales/Australian Capital Territory (NSW/ACT), Northern Territory, Queensland and Tasmania in Division 2. The competition was played over five rounds, in seven states and territories, across two divisions. In the first two rounds of the competition, the second-division teams crossed over and played the division one sides, while the final three rounds of matches were played between the teams in each the division. South Australia and Tasmania were the Division 1 and Division 2 champions, respectively. The Larke Medal (for the best player in Division 1) was awarded to Western Australia's Dom Sheed, and the Hunter Harrison Medal (for the best player in Division 2) was shared between three players—Queensland's Liam Dawson and Tasmania's Kade Kolodjashnij and Toby Nankervis.

== Fixtures ==
=== Round 1 ===
	Round 1
Saturday, 25 May (6:00pm)	Northern Territory 5.4 (34)	def. by	Vic Country 22.13 (145)	TIO Stadium	Report
Sunday, 26 May (1:00pm)	Queensland 9.6 (60)	def. by	Vic Metro 12.28 (100)	Yeronga	Report
Saturday, 1 June (12:00pm)	NSW/ACT 10.7 (67)	def. by	South Australia 17.13 (115)	Blacktown International Sportspark	Report
Sunday, 2 June (10:10am)	Tasmania 5.9 (39)	def. by	Western Australia 14.17 (101)	Aurora Stadium	Report

=== Round 2 ===
	Round 2
Saturday, 8 June (11:30am)	Queensland 6.6 (42)	def. by	South Australia 22.10 (142)	Fankhauser Reserve	Report
Saturday, 8 June (12:00pm)	Western Australia 18.13 (121)	def.	Northern Territory 5.9 (39)	Brownes Stadium	Report
Sunday, 9 June (12:00pm)	Vic Country 15.15 (105)	def.	Tasmania 7.2 (44)	Visy Park	Report
Sunday, 9 June (2:30pm)	Vic Metro 20.12 (132)	def.	NSW/ACT 9.8 (62)	Visy Park	Report

=== Round 3 ===
	Round 3
Saturday, 15 June (11:20am)	Western Australia 12.9 (81)	def. by	Vic Metro 15.10 (100)	Patersons Stadium	Report
Sunday, 16 June (12:00pm)	South Australia 11.13 (79)	def.	Vic Country 6.9 (45)	City Mazda Stadium	Report
Saturday, 22 June (10:25am)	Tasmania 15.13 (103)	def.	Queensland 5.4 (34)	Blundstone Arena	Report
Saturday, 22 June (12:00pm)	NSW/ACT 19.19 (133)	def.	Northern Territory 5.2 (32)	Blacktown International Sportspark	Report

=== Round 4 ===
	Round 4
Friday, 28 June (12:35pm)	Vic Country 10.10 (70)	def. by	Western Australia 11.7 (73)	Simonds Stadium	Report
Friday, 28 June (2:35pm)	Vic Metro 8.7 (55)	def. by	South Australia 8.10 (58)	Simonds Stadium	Report
Saturday, 29 June (12:00pm)	Northern Territory 3.3 (21)	def. by	Tasmania 21.13 (139)	Visy Park	Report
Saturday, 29 June (2:15pm)	NSW/ACT 7.5 (47)	def. by	Queensland 8.8 (56)	Visy Park	Report

=== Round 5 ===
	Round 5
Wednesday, 3 July (3:35pm)	South Australia 11.9 (75)	def.	Western Australia 10.5 (65)	Etihad Stadium	Report
Wednesday, 3 July (5:35pm)	Vic Country 6.6 (42)	def. by	Vic Metro 9.7 (61)	Etihad Stadium	Report
Thursday, 4 July (11:00am)	Northern Territory 6.7 (43)	def. by	Queensland 7.4 (46)	Victoria Park	Report
Thursday, 4 July (1:15pm)	NSW/ACT 6.10 (46)	def.	Tasmania 4.4 (28)	Victoria Park	Report

== All-Australian team ==
The 2013 Under 18 All-Australian team was named on 9 July 2013:

2013 Under 18 All-Australian team
B:	Zak Jones (VC)	Darcy Gardiner (VC)	Liam Dawson (Qld)
HB:	Clem Smith (WA)	Matt Scharenberg (SA)	Kade Kolodjashnij (Tas)
C:	Billy Hartung (VC)	Dom Sheed (WA)	James Aish (SA)
HF:	Ben Lennon (VM)	Cam McCarthy (WA)	Jack Billings (VM)
F:	Lewis Taylor (VC)	Tom Boyd (VM)	Darcy Hourigan (SA)
Foll:	Toby Nankervis (Tas)	Luke Dunstan (SA)	Josh Kelly (VM)
Int:	Mitch Honeychurch (VM)	Patrick Cripps (WA)	James Battersby (SA)
Int:	Lloyd Perris (NSW/ACT)		
Coach:	Brenton Phillips (SA)		
