= Brayden Maynard =

Australian rules footballer (born 1996)

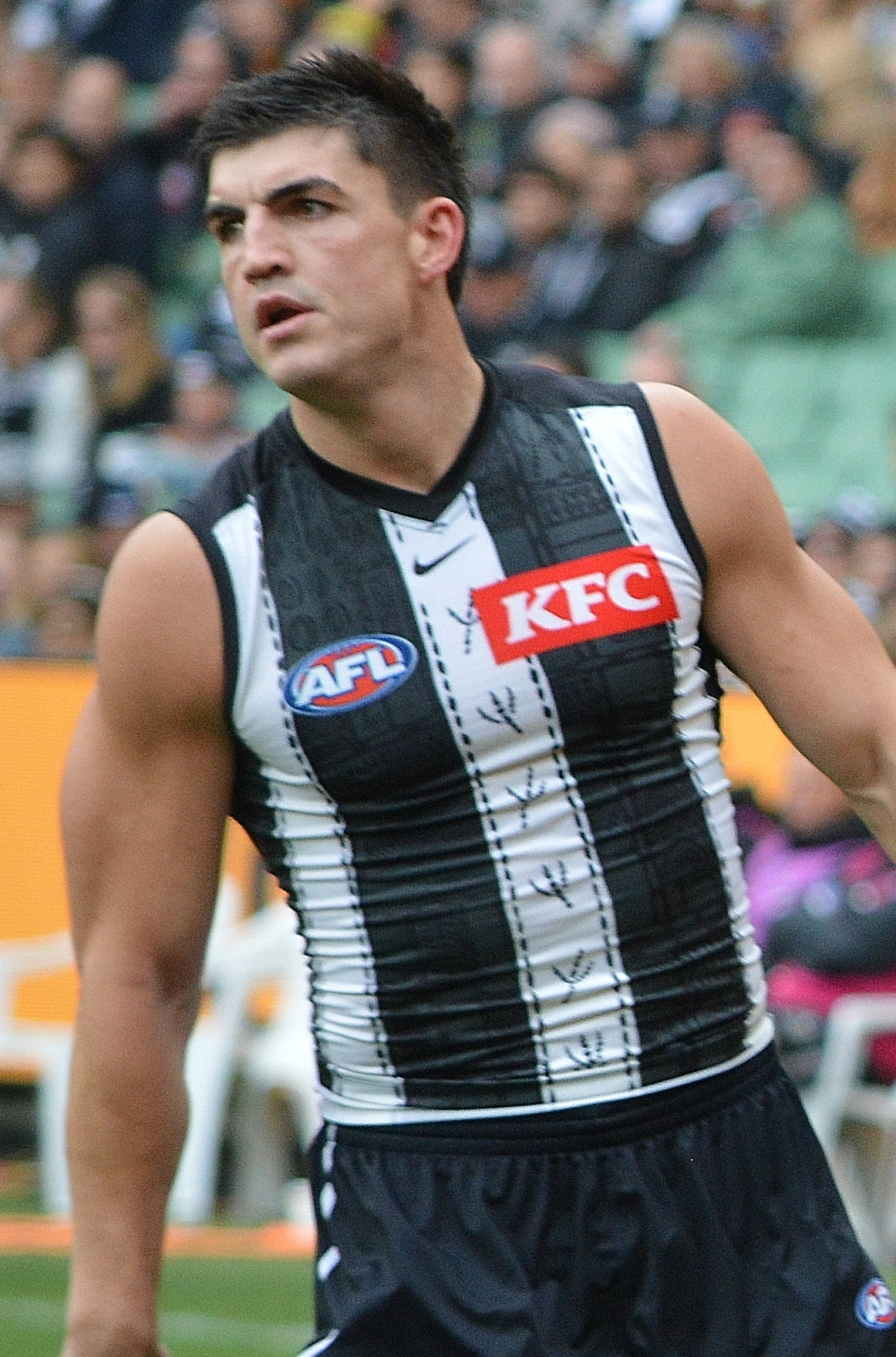
- Maynard playing for Collingwood in May 2025

Personal information
- Full name: Brayden Maynard
- Nicknames: Bruzzy, Bruz
- Born: 20 September 1996 (age 30); Adelaide, South Australia
- Original team: Sandringham Dragons (TAC Cup) / Hampton Rovers (SMJFL)
- Draft: No. 30, 2014 national draft
- Height: 189 cm (6 ft 2 in)
- Weight: 93 kg (205 lb)
- Position: Defender

Club information
- Current club: Collingwood
- Number: 4

Playing career^{1}
Years	Club	Games (Goals)
2015–	Collingwood	246 (26)
- ^{1} Playing statistics correct to the end of the 2026 season.

Career highlights
- AFL premiership player: 2023; Collingwood co-vice captain: 2023–; All-Australian team: 2022

Brayden Maynard (born 20 September 1996) is an Australian rules footballer who currently plays for the Collingwood Football Club in the Australian Football League (AFL).

== State football ==
Maynard played junior football with the Hampton Rovers in the South Metro Junior Football League. He also played juniors for PHOS Camden during a stint living back in Adelaide. Maynard later returned to Melbourne and represented Sandringham Dragons in the TAC Cup. He played 13 games for them in the 2013 TAC Cup season and 17 games in the 2014 TAC Cup season. During the 2014 season, he averaged 22 disposals and 6 tackles per game, winning the club's season best and fairest award. Sandringham Dragons' talent manager, Ryan O'Connor, compared Maynard to Luke Hodge, saying "he's a really exciting player because he's quite explosive and powerful and has got a beautiful left foot kick and a real feel for the game." Maynard represented Vic Metro at the 2014 AFL Under 18 Championships, averaging 15 disposals and 5 tackles per game. He was named among the best players in both matches against Vic Country, and scored a goal in the second game against Vic Country as well as in both games against Western Australia.

== AFL career ==
Maynard was drafted by Collingwood with their third selection and 30th pick overall in the 2014 AFL draft. After being drafted to the club, he was glad that he knew his fellow draftees, having played with Jordan De Goey, Darcy Moore, and Matthew Goodyear at the AFL Under 18 Championships. He made his debut against Hawthorn in round 14 of the 2015 season. After the 2017 season, Maynard signed a contract extension until the end of the 2020 season. Maynard played in Collingwood's losing team in the 2018 Grand Final against West Coast. He was involved in the controversial goal at the end, with some fans and analysts claiming he should've been awarded a free kick after being blocked by Willie Rioli, which allowed Dom Sheed to mark and kick the winning goal. In April 2019, despite having more than a year left on his contract, Collingwood signed Maynard on another two-year contract extension, keeping him at the club until the end of the 2022 season. In the 2019 season, Maynard came in fifth in the Copeland Trophy count, giving a humorous speech, which included a light dig at Justin Longmuir, Collingwood's assistant coach who left to take up the head coaching role at Fremantle. In the third round of the 2020 season, Maynard played his 100th game for Collingwood. Maynard was selected in the 2022 All-Australian team as a defender. Ahead of the 2023 season, it was announced Maynard will wear the number 4 on his jersey, previously worn by Brodie Grundy who was traded to Melbourne. In the first match of the 2023 AFL finals series against Melbourne, Maynard attempted to smother and while landing made contact with Angus Brayshaw's head, knocking Brayshaw unconscious for two minutes. The incident was referred to the AFL Tribunal, which cleared Maynard.

== Coaching ==
In 2019, Maynard took on an assistant coaching role, under Peter Schwab, at De La Salle College where he studied.

== Personal life ==
Maynard was born in Adelaide, living there briefly, but grew up in Melbourne barracking for Melbourne. He is the son of Peter Maynard, who played for Melbourne in the AFL and for Glenelg in the South Australian National Football League (SANFL) and the grandson of Graham Campbell, who played and coached Fitzroy, as well as coaching West Perth and Glenelg. His brother, Corey, played football for Melbourne in the AFL as a category B rookie after a career playing basketball professionally. He attended De La Salle College in Malvern, an inner suburb of Melbourne. Maynard has obsessive–compulsive disorder (OCD).

== Statistics ==
Updated to the end of round 22, 2026.

Legend
G	Goals	K	Kicks	D	Disposals	T	Tackles
B	Behinds	H	Handballs	M	Marks
#	Played in that season's premiership team

Season	Team	No.	Games	Totals							Averages (per game)							Votes
Season	Team	No.	Games	G	B	K	H	D	M	T	G	B	K	H	D	M	T	Votes
2015	Collingwood	37	9	2	0	76	48	124	25	30	0.2	0.0	8.4	5.3	13.8	2.8	3.3	0
2016	Collingwood	37	20	4	7	215	95	310	89	71	0.2	0.4	10.8	4.8	15.5	4.5	3.6	0
2017	Collingwood	37	22	6	4	256	126	382	91	72	0.3	0.2	11.6	5.7	17.4	4.1	3.3	0
2018	Collingwood	37	22	2	4	247	152	399	69	89	0.1	0.2	11.2	6.9	18.1	3.1	4.0	0
2019	Collingwood	37	24	1	3	310	144	454	104	92	0.0	0.1	12.9	6.0	18.9	4.3	3.8	1
2020 (Note: The 2020 season was played with 17 home-and-away matches per team (down from 22) and 16-minute quarters with time on (down from 20-minute quarters with time on) due to the impact of the COVID-19 pandemic.)	Collingwood	37	19	0	1	254	95	349	78	48	0.0	0.1	13.4	5.0	18.4	4.1	2.5	0
2021	Collingwood	37	22	1	0	335	126	461	121	57	0.0	0.0	15.2	5.7	21.0	5.5	2.6	0
2022	Collingwood	37	23	1	2	271	121	392	110	81	0.0	0.1	11.8	5.3	17.0	4.8	3.5	0
2023^{#}	Collingwood	4	25	0	5	318	136	454	125	74	0.0	0.2	12.7	5.4	18.2	5.0	3.0	0
2024	Collingwood	4	23	3	1	301	91	392	124	54	0.1	0.0	13.1	4.0	17.0	5.4	2.3	0
2025	Collingwood	4	20	5	1	234	87	321	95	50	0.3	0.1	11.7	4.4	16.1	4.8	2.5	0
2026	Collingwood	4	17	1	2	224	82	306	88	68	0.1	0.1	13.2	4.8	18.0	5.2	4.0	0
Career			246	26	30	3041	1303	4344	1119	786	0.1	0.1	12.4	5.3	17.7	4.5	3.2	1

== Honours and achievements ==
Team

- AFL minor premiership (Collingwood) 2023
- AFL premiership player (Collingwood) 2023

Individual

- All-Australian team: 2022
