= Dom Sheed =

Australian rules footballer

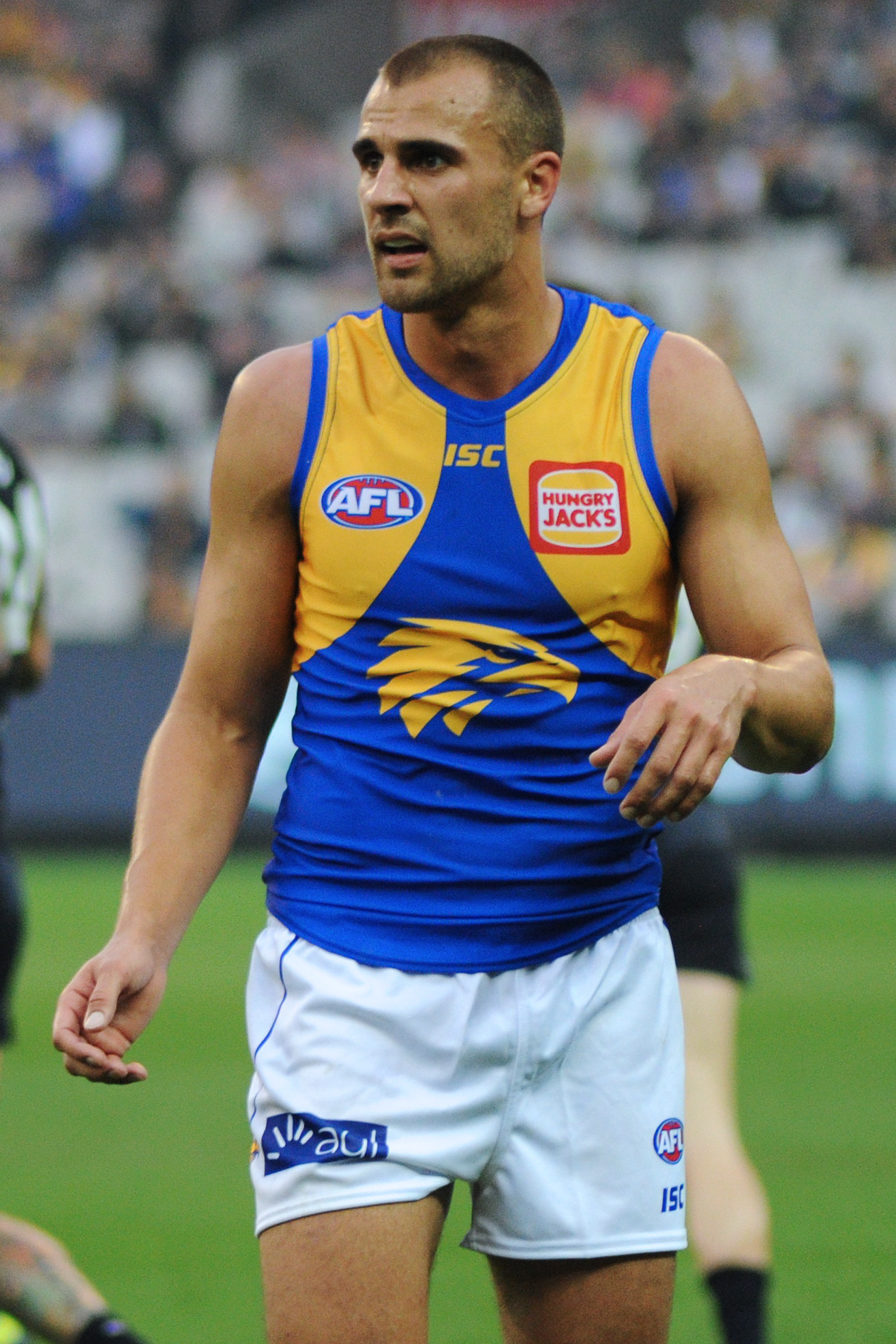
- Sheed playing for West Coast in April 2018

Personal information
- Full name: Dominic Sheed
- Born: 10 April 1995 (age 31); Kalgoorlie, Western Australia
- Original team: Mines Rovers (GFL) / Subiaco (WAFL)
- Draft: No. 11, 2013 national draft
- Height: 185 cm (6 ft 1 in)
- Weight: 87 kg (192 lb)
- Position: Midfielder

Playing career
Years	Club	Games (Goals)
2014–2025	West Coast	165 (69)

Career highlights
- AFL premiership player: 2018; AFL Rising Star nominee: 2015; Larke Medal: 2013; Western Australia under 18 captain: 2013

Dominic Sheed (born 10 April 1995) is a former professional Australian rules footballer, having played for the West Coast Eagles in the Australian Football League (AFL).

== Early life ==
From Kalgoorlie, in the Goldfields region of Western Australia, Sheed played underage football for Mines Rovers in the Goldfields Football League (GFL), but moved to Perth at the age of 16 to play for Subiaco in the West Australian Football League (WAFL). A midfielder, he made his senior debut for Subiaco in round 21 of the 2012 season, aged 17 years, 133 days, having been a regular in the colts team before then. Sheed was part of the 2012–13 intake into the AIS–AFL Academy, part of the Australian Institute of Sport, and toured Europe with the squad in 2013. As well as playing four further senior matches for Subiaco during the 2013 season, Sheed also captained Western Australia at the AFL Under 18 Championships, winning the Larke Medal as the best player at the tournament. He had averaged 28 disposals across his four games at the tournament, and kicked four goals against Victoria Country, despite breaking his collarbone late in the match.

== West Coast ==
Sheed was drafted by West Coast with pick 11 in the 2013 national draft. The club was able to select him despite "downgrading" from pick six to pick eleven as part of a trade with Brisbane to secure Elliot Yeo. After strong form in the pre-season, Sheed was selected to make his senior AFL debut in round one of the 2014 season. He played as the substitute, and recorded three disposals after replacing Luke Shuey at three-quarter time. He was dropped from the team the following round to get more game time, instead playing for West Coast's WAFL affiliate, East Perth. Sheed played ten games for West Coast in his debut season, including six consecutive games late in the season, from rounds 17 to 22. He also played for East Perth in the 2014 WAFL finals series.

After playing 18 matches throughout the 2018 season, Sheed rose to fame after taking a mark towards the end of the Grand Final, and kicking the goal that resulted in the Eagles taking the lead with minimal time left to play. The Eagles clung on to win the match by five points, resulting in the club winning their fourth premiership.

In February 2025, Sheed was ruled our for the entire 2025 season after rupturing his ACL. On 1 July 2025, he announced his retirement from the AFL after 165 games. He was limited to just 24 games through the previous four seasons due to injuries.

== Statistics ==
Legend
G	Goals	K	Kicks	D	Disposals	T	Tackles
B	Behinds	H	Handballs	M	Marks
#	Played in that season's premiership team

Season	Team	No.	Games	Totals							Averages (per game)							Votes
Season	Team	No.	Games	G	B	K	H	D	M	T	G	B	K	H	D	M	T	Votes
2014	West Coast	4	10	1	3	51	56	107	17	27	0.1	0.3	5.1	5.6	10.7	1.7	2.7	0
2015	West Coast	4	23	10	11	229	220	449	70	52	0.4	0.5	10.0	9.6	19.5	3.0	2.3	0
2016	West Coast	4	6	1	2	51	43	94	17	11	0.2	0.3	8.5	7.2	15.7	2.8	1.8	0
2017	West Coast	4	21	11	13	272	196	468	104	53	0.5	0.6	13.0	9.3	22.3	5.0	2.5	2
2018^{#}	West Coast	4	18	8	7	231	182	413	72	33	0.4	0.4	12.8	10.1	22.9	4.0	1.8	3
2019	West Coast	4	24	16	15	344	291	635	128	39	0.7	0.6	14.3	12.1	26.5	5.3	1.6	12
2020 (Note: The 2020 season was played with 17 home-and-away matches per team (down from 22) and 16-minute quarters with time on (down from 20-minute quarters with time on) due to the impact of the COVID-19 pandemic.)	West Coast	4	17	8	3	172	163	335	55	39	0.5	0.2	10.1	9.6	19.7	3.2	2.3	11
2021	West Coast	4	22	9	6	320	259	579	108	51	0.4	0.3	14.5	11.8	26.3	4.9	2.3	13
2022	West Coast	4	1	0	0	11	9	20	2	4	0.0	0.0	11.0	9.0	20.0	2.0	4.0	0
2023	West Coast	4	15	5	4	184	182	366	84	47	0.3	0.3	12.3	12.1	24.4	5.6	3.1	6
2024	West Coast	4	8	0	1	50	47	97	13	23	0.0	0.1	6.3	5.9	12.1	1.6	2.9	0
2025	West Coast	4	0	—	—	—	—	—	—	—	—	—	—	—	—	—	—	0
Career			165	69	65	1915	1648	3563	670	379	0.4	0.4	11.6	10.0	21.6	4.1	2.3	47
