= Levi Greenwood =

Australian rules footballer

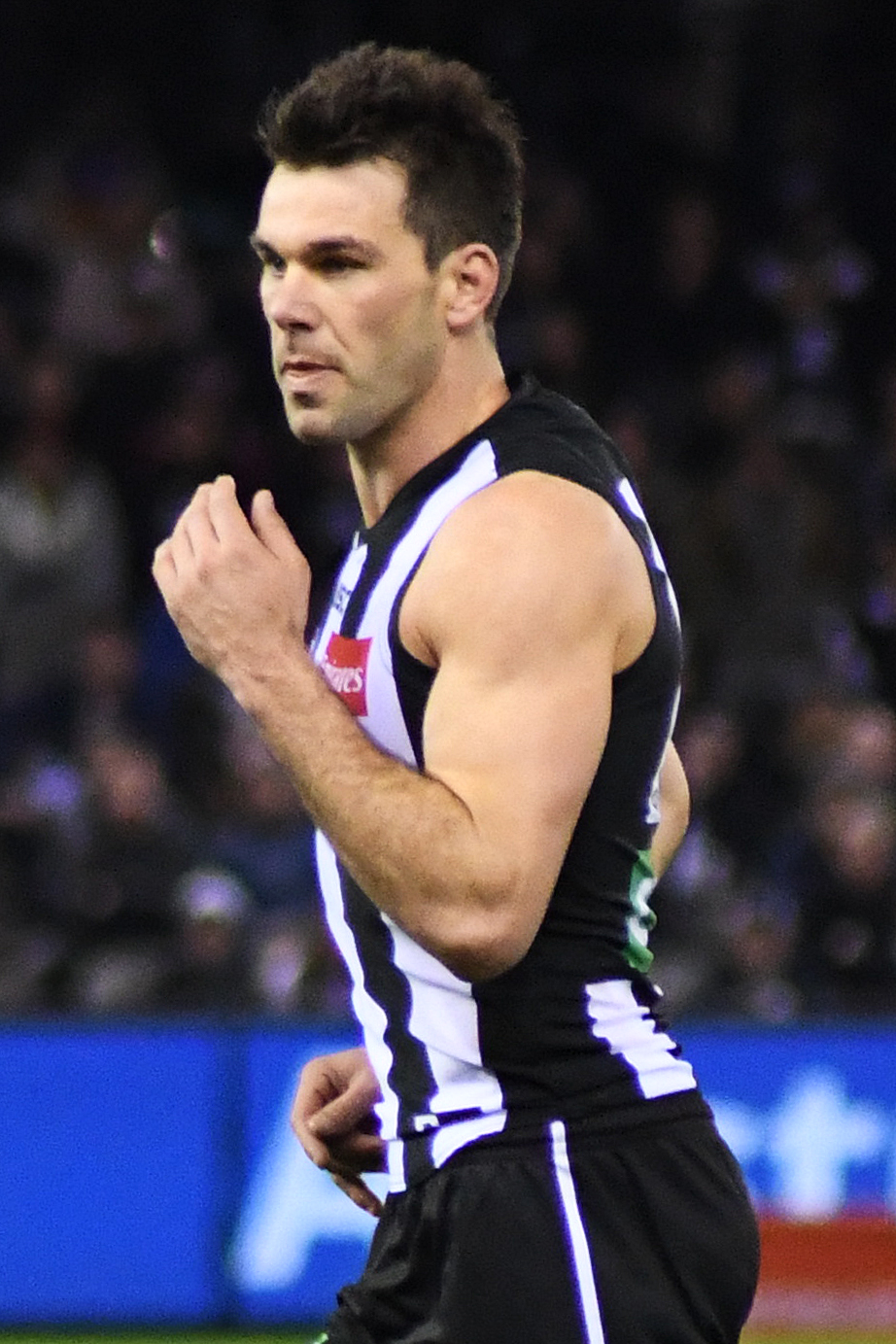
- Greenwood playing for Collingwood in August 2018

Personal information
- Full name: Levi Greenwood
- Born: 19 February 1989 (age 37); Whyalla, South Australia
- Original team: Port Adelaide (SANFL)
- Draft: #32, 2007 National draft, Kangaroos
- Height: 181 cm (5 ft 11 in)
- Weight: 85 kg (187 lb)
- Position: Midfielder

Playing career^{1}
Years	Club	Games (Goals)
2008–2014	North Melbourne	74 (26)
2015–2021	Collingwood	86 (31)
Total		160 (57)
- ^{1} Playing statistics correct to the end of the 2021 season.

Levi Greenwood (born 19 February 1989) is a retired Australian rules footballer, who played for North Melbourne from 2009 to 2014 and for Collingwood from 2015 to 2021 in the Australian Football League (AFL).

Greenwood grew up in the small coastal town of Port Neill on the Eyre Peninsula, and moved to Whyalla in his teens.

Greenwood played his junior football at the North Whyalla Football Club in South Australia. He joined the Port Adelaide Magpies in 2005, where he played under-17s and under-19s football. In 2007, he played eleven games in the Port Adelaide seniors in the SANFL at the age of just eighteen. He nominated for the 2007 AFL National draft, where he was selected by North Melbourne with its second round draft selection (#32 overall). Greenwood is mainly used in the midfield.

Levi played his first game in Round 5 2009 against Richmond.

Finished equal second in the best and fairest 2014 before requesting a trade to the Collingwood Magpies. The deal was finalised on the second last day of trade week with Collingwood sending pick 25 in return for Greenwood.

In June 2021, Greenwood announced his retirement from football following complications resulting from concussions sustained during his career.

== Statistics ==
Statistics are correct to the end of the 2021 season

Legend
G	Goals	K	Kicks	D	Disposals	T	Tackles
B	Behinds	H	Handballs	M	Marks

Season	Team	No.	Games	Totals							Averages (per game)						
Season	Team	No.	Games	G	B	K	H	D	M	T	G	B	K	H	D	M	T
2008	North Melbourne	24	0	—	—	—	—	—	—	—	—	—	—	—	—	—	—
2009	North Melbourne	24	11	1	2	75	46	121	21	48	0.1	0.2	6.8	4.2	11.0	1.9	4.4
2010	North Melbourne	24	17	4	5	156	151	307	64	79	0.2	0.3	9.2	8.9	18.1	3.8	4.6
2011	North Melbourne	24	13	3	2	97	105	202	19	49	0.2	0.2	7.5	8.1	15.5	1.5	3.8
2012	North Melbourne	24	5	1	3	39	26	65	4	19	0.2	0.6	7.8	5.2	13.0	0.8	3.8
2013	North Melbourne	24	6	1	0	60	71	131	16	33	0.2	0.0	10.0	11.8	21.8	2.7	5.5
2014	North Melbourne	24	22	16	18	322	228	550	119	97	0.7	0.8	14.6	10.4	25.0	5.4	4.4
2015	Collingwood	19	8	4	1	81	63	144	32	48	0.5	0.1	10.1	7.9	18.0	4.0	6.0
2016	Collingwood	19	21	18	9	204	161	365	49	135	0.9	0.4	9.7	7.7	17.4	2.3	6.4
2017	Collingwood	19	16	7	18	143	107	250	73	51	0.4	1.1	8.9	6.7	15.6	4.6	3.2
2018	Collingwood	19	16	1	5	145	70	215	47	55	0.06	0.3	9.1	4.4	13.4	2.9	3.4
2019	Collingwood	19	17	0	1	160	91	251	77	43	0.0	0.06	9.4	5.4	14.8	4.5	2.5
2020	Collingwood	19	6	1	0	37	33	70	8	19	0.2	0.0	6.2	5.5	11.7	1.3	3.2
2021	Collingwood	19	2	0	0	16	9	25	3	7	0.0	0.0	8.0	4.5	12.5	1.5	3.5
Career			160	57	64	1535	1161	2696	532	683	0.4	0.4	9.6	7.3	16.9	3.3	4.3
