= Jordan De Goey =

Australian rules footballer (born 1996)

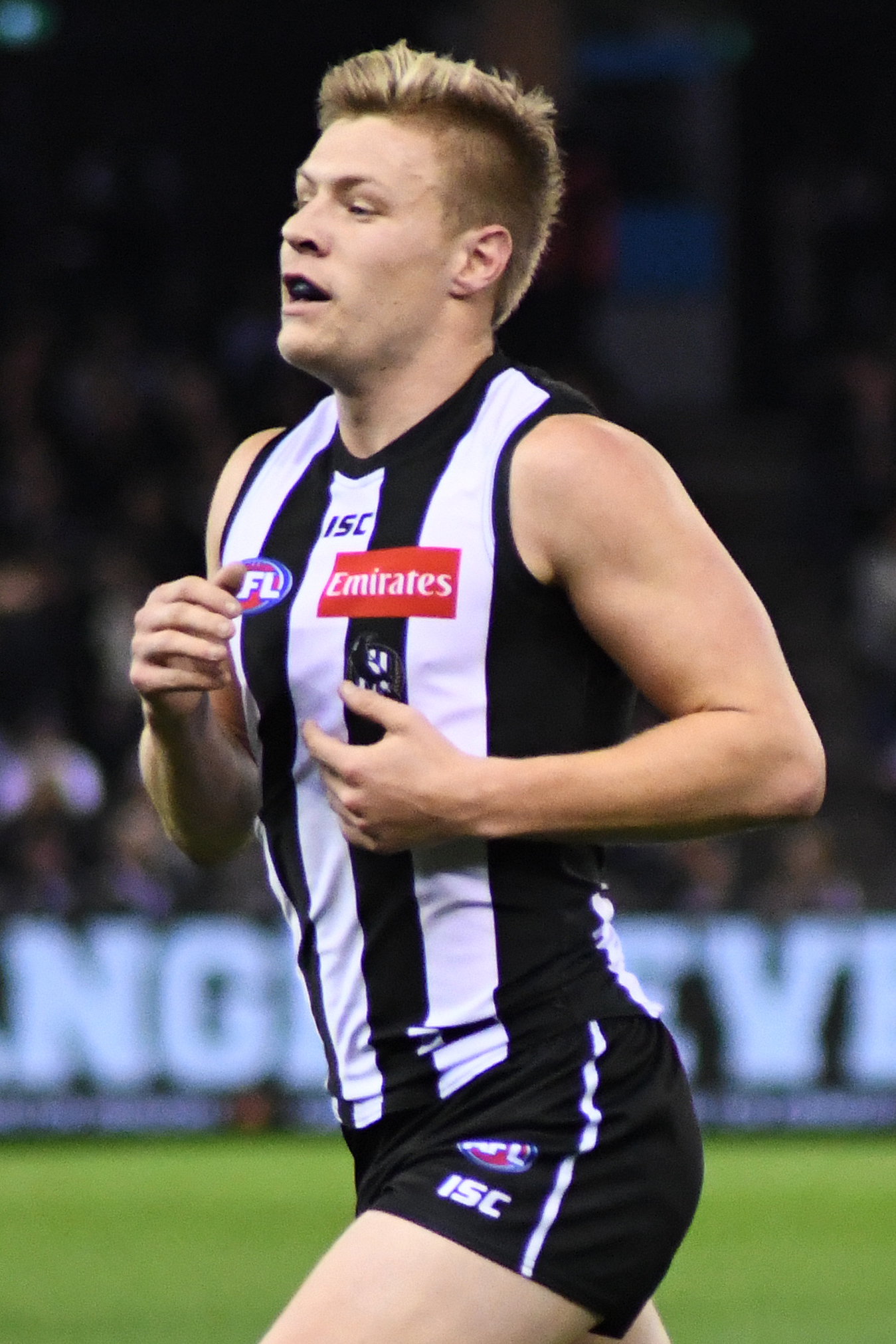
- De Goey playing in August 2018

Personal information
- Full name: Jordan De Goey
- Nickname: Jordy
- Born: 15 March 1996 (age 30); Hornsby, New South Wales, Australia
- Original team: Oakleigh Chargers (TAC Cup)
- Draft: No. 5, 2014 national draft
- Height: 188 cm (6 ft 2 in)
- Weight: 93 kg (205 lb)
- Position: Midfielder / forward

Club information
- Current club: Collingwood
- Number: 2

Playing career^{1}
Years	Club	Games (Goals)
2015–	Collingwood	204 (231)
- ^{1} Playing statistics correct to the end of the 2026 season.

Career highlights
- AFL premiership player: 2023; 22under22 team: 2018; 2015 AFL Rising Star: nominee; Collingwood leading goalkicker: 2018

Jordan De Goey (born 15 March 1996) is a professional Australian rules footballer playing for the Collingwood Football Club in the Australian Football League (AFL).

== State football ==
De Goey played his junior football with the Ashburton United Junior Football Club in the Yarra Junior Football League. He later played with Oakleigh Chargers in the TAC Cup, under the captaincy of Darcy Moore, who was drafted to Collingwood in the same year as him. In the 2013 TAC Cup season, he played only four games, but later starred in the 2014 TAC Cup Grand Final, kicking three goals to help Oakleigh Chargers claim the premiership. De Goey also represented Vic Metro in the 2014 AFL Under 18 Championships.

== AFL career ==
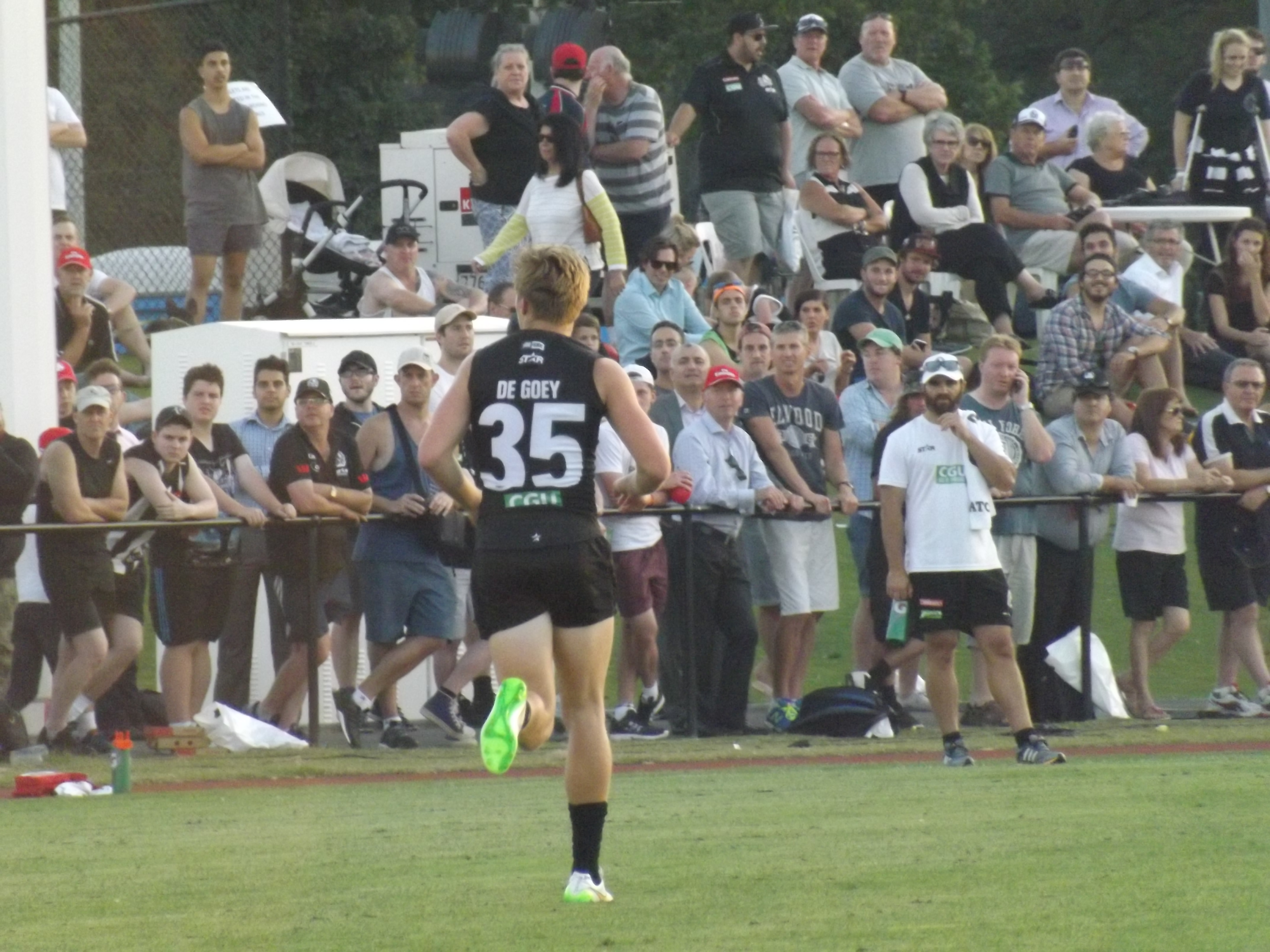
As Collingwood's first pick of the draft, De Goey played his first season with the guernsey number 35

De Goey was drafted by Collingwood with the 5th overall selection of the 2014 national draft. As Collingwood's first pick, he was assigned the number 35 guernsey for his first season. He made his debut in the opening round of the 2015 season against Brisbane Lions at The Gabba, being the 20th player to make their senior debut under the coaching of Nathan Buckley. He received a Rising Star nomination in round 20 after collecting 18 disposals, 12 tackles and kicking a goal in a 21-point defeat against Sydney at the Sydney Cricket Ground. De Goey had a break out 2018 season, raising comparisons with Dustin Martin. He started the season after returning from a club-imposed suspension, and he returned via the Victorian Football League (VFL), collecting 24 disposals and kicking 4 goals against the Northern Blues. During the season, De Goey re-signed with Collingwood for another two years, turning down multi-year, multi-million contract offers from North Melbourne and St Kilda. In the preliminary final against Richmond, he kicked four goals, including the first one, and was named among the best players. He also kicked three goals and was named among the best players in Collingwood's loss to West Coast in the Grand Final. After the season he was selected by the AFL Players Association for the 22 Under 22 team and won the Gordon Coventry Award as Collingwood's leading goalkicker after kicking 48 goals during the season. In 2023, De Goey was named in the initial All-Australian squad of 44 for the second time. De Goey had 34 disposals and 13 clearances in the 2023 preliminary final victory against the Greater Western Sydney Giants.

== Personal life ==
De Goey was educated at St Kevin's College in Toorak, Melbourne. His father, Roger, was an under-19s player for Essendon.

=== Controversies ===
At the beginning of the 2017 season, De Goey broke his hand during an incident in a bar in St Kilda. Initially he lied to the club, telling them he injured it while playing with his dog and after admitting to his lie was suspended for three matches, fined $5,000, and given 10 weeks of community service.

In February 2018, he was suspended by Collingwood after being caught drunk driving. He was fined $10,000 and required to pay a further $10,000 to charity, during which time he worked for a month as a tradesman and with the Salvation Army.

In July 2020, De Goey and another man were charged by Victoria Police with indecent assault, stemming from an incident that was alleged to have taken place with a woman in 2015. The matter had been investigated by the Police and the AFL's Integrity Unit in 2018, and no charges were laid following those investigations. In response, Collingwood confirmed De Goey could continue playing for the club whilst the matter proceeded in the courts. In August 2021, minutes prior to the commencement of a directions hearing into the matter was due to be heard at the Melbourne Magistrates Court, prosecutors withdrew the charge laid against both men and agreed to pay De Goey's legal costs. De Goey released a statement shortly thereafter stating, "I have maintained my innocence from the outset...[and] am very pleased that the matter has now come to an end."

In October 2021, De Goey was arrested at a night club in New York City and charged with forcible touching of a 35-year-old woman and the assault of a 37-year-old man. He was stood down indefinitely by Collingwood and pleaded not guilty to the charges, along with another Australian man who was charged. A couple of days later, the prosecutors dropped the charge of forcible touching. In January 2022, he was offered a plea bargain to downgrade the remaining assault charge to second-degree harassment. Collingwood reinstated De Goey into their AFL program following the plea, allowing him to play under their condition that he permanently works part-time at the Salvation Army.

In June 2022, footage of De Goey mimicking a sexual act making crude tongue gestures while partying in a Bali night club emerged. In another part of the footage, an undisclosed figure attempted to reveal a woman's breast as she lay on the bar. Some media articles wrote that De Goey is attempting to expose the woman's breast in the video, but it is unclear as the face and body are not shown. De Goey lashed out at what he claimed was a "relentless pursuit of athletes by the media" and said that "this will end in tragedy if no one speaks up". Remy Jackson, the woman filmed with De Goey, defended him on Instagram, posting: "I can't believe the backlash towards Jordy and myself over here in Bali … nothing to see here." Following the incident, Collingwood withdrew the two-year contract (with a trigger for two further years) that they had offered De Goey. He then apologised for his conduct and was given a suspended $25,000 fine by the club.

== Statistics ==
Updated to the end of round 22, 2026.

Legend
G	Goals	K	Kicks	D	Disposals	T	Tackles
B	Behinds	H	Handballs	M	Marks
#	Played in that season's premiership team

Season	Team	No.	Games	Totals							Averages (per game)							Votes
Season	Team	No.	Games	G	B	K	H	D	M	T	G	B	K	H	D	M	T	Votes
2015	Collingwood	35	16	6	4	125	97	222	31	78	0.4	0.3	7.8	6.1	13.9	1.9	4.9	0
2016	Collingwood	2	20	16	14	184	181	365	81	71	0.8	0.7	9.2	9.1	18.3	4.1	3.6	0
2017	Collingwood	2	14	14	8	139	126	265	60	47	1.0	0.6	9.9	9.0	18.9	4.3	3.4	5
2018	Collingwood	2	21	48	22	232	106	338	92	48	2.3	1.0	11.0	5.0	16.1	4.4	2.3	12
2019	Collingwood	2	17	34	22	204	81	285	80	35	2.0	1.3	12.0	4.8	16.8	4.7	2.1	4
2020 (Note: The 2020 season was played with 17 home-and-away matches per team (down from 22) and 16-minute quarters with time on (down from 20-minute quarters with time on) due to the impact of the COVID-19 pandemic.)	Collingwood	2	10	14	12	86	49	135	26	12	1.4	1.2	8.6	4.9	13.5	2.6	1.2	5
2021	Collingwood	2	20	23	23	251	169	420	108	39	1.2	1.2	12.6	8.5	21.0	5.4	2.0	9
2022	Collingwood	2	19	18	18	227	168	395	61	66	0.9	0.9	11.9	8.8	20.8	3.2	3.5	10
2023^{#}	Collingwood	2	21	18	9	257	245	502	76	68	0.9	0.4	12.2	11.7	23.9	3.6	3.2	8
2024	Collingwood	2	13	10	9	145	126	271	50	46	0.8	0.7	11.2	9.7	20.8	3.8	3.5	8
2025	Collingwood	2	11	9	9	92	73	165	27	24	0.8	0.8	8.4	6.6	15.0	2.5	2.2	1
2026	Collingwood	2	19	18	12	232	169	401	97	44	0.9	0.6	12.2	8.9	21.1	5.1	2.3	0
Career			201	228	162	2174	1590	3764	789	578	1.1	0.8	10.8	7.9	18.7	3.9	2.9	62

== Honours and achievements ==
Team

- AFL Premiership (Collingwood) 2023

Individual

- Collingwood Leading Goalkicker Award: 2018 (48)
- AFL Rising Star nominee: 2015 (round 20)
