= 2018 Collingwood Football Club season =

Collingwood Football Club
2018 season
- President: Eddie McGuire
- Coach: Nathan Buckley (7th season)
- Captains: Scott Pendlebury (5th season)
- Home ground: The MCG
- Regular season: 3rd
- Finals series: Runners-up
- Best and Fairest: Steele Sidebottom & Brodie Grundy
- Leading goalkicker: Jordan De Goey (48 goals)
- Highest home attendance: 91,440 vs. Essendon (Round 5)
- Lowest home attendance: 30,941 vs. Greater Western Sydney (Round 2)
- Average home attendance: 49,898 (excluding finals)
- Club membership: 75,507

The 2018 Collingwood Football Club season was the club's 122nd season of senior competition in the Australian Football League (AFL). The club also fielded its reserves team in the VFL and a women's team in the AFL Women's competition.

== Squad ==
Players are listed by guernsey number, and 2018 statistics are for AFL regular season and finals series matches during the 2018 AFL season only. Career statistics include a player's complete AFL career, which, as a result, means that a player's debut and part or whole of their career statistics may be for another club. Statistics are correct as of the Grand Final of the 2018 season (29 September 2018) and are taken from AFL Tables.

No.	Name	AFL debut	Games (2018)	Goals (2018)	Games (CFC)	Goals (CFC)	Games (AFL career)	Goals (AFL career)
1	Alex Fasolo	2011	1	0	101	133	101	133
2	Jordan De Goey	2015	21	48	71	84	71	84
3	Daniel Wells	2003 (North Melbourne)	4	2	14	13	257	163
4	Brodie Grundy	2013	26	9	108	36	108	36
5	Jamie Elliott	2012	0	0	89	138	89	138
6	Tyson Goldsack	2007	4	0	165	50	165	50
7	Adam Treloar	2012 (Greater Western Sydney)	17	12	60	38	139	86
8	Tom Langdon	2014	23	1	80	3	80	3
9	Sam Murray	2018	13	0	13	0	13	0
10	Scott Pendlebury (c)	2006	25	9	277	166	277	166
11	Jarryd Blair	2010	2	0	157	121	157	121
12	Matthew Scharenberg	2015	17	0	31	0	31	0
13	Taylor Adams	2012 (Greater Western Sydney)	23	9	89	33	120	45
14	James Aish	2014 (Brisbane Lions)	13	4	36	15	68	23
15	Lynden Dunn	2006 (Melbourne)	14	0	31	1	196	98
16	Chris Mayne	2008 (Fremantle)	21	5	24	7	196	203
17	Callum Brown	2017	8	1	13	2	13	2
18	Travis Varcoe	2007 (Geelong)	20	13	67	31	205	161
19	Levi Greenwood	2009 (North Melbourne)	16	1	61	30	135	56
20	Ben Reid	2007	6	8	142	59	142	59
21	Tom Phillips	2016	26	15	50	27	50	27
22	Steele Sidebottom	2009	26	12	211	151	211	151
23	Sam McLarty	****	0	0	0	0	0	0
24	Josh Thomas	2013	26	39	67	64	67	64
25	Jack Crisp	2012 (Brisbane Lions)	26	4	92	35	110	45
26	Josh Daicos	2017	10	5	12	6	12	6
27	Kayle Kirby	2017	0	0	1	0	1	0
28	Nathan Murphy	2018	2	0	2	0	2	0
29	Tim Broomhead	2014	1	0	36	27	36	27
30	Darcy Moore	2015	7	3	54	61	54	61
31	Flynn Appleby	2018	9	0	9	0	9	0
32	Will Hoskin-Elliott	2012 (Greater Western Sydney)	26	42	48	60	100	102
33	Rupert Wills	2016	0	0	6	1	6	1
34	Tyler Brown	****	0	0	0	0	0	0
35	Jaidyn Stephenson	2018	26	38	26	38	26	38
36	Brayden Sier	2018	12	2	12	2	12	2
37	Brayden Maynard	2015	22	2	73	14	73	14
38	Jeremy Howe	2011 (Melbourne)	21	2	62	8	162	88
39	Ben Crocker	2016	10	5	23	18	23	18
40	Josh Smith	2016	1	0	32	6	32	6
41	Brody Mihocek	2018	16	29	16	29	16	29
43	Adam Oxley	2013	3	1	34	10	34	10
44	Jack Madgen	2018	4	0	4	0	4	0
45	Max Lynch	****	0	0	0	0	0	0
46	Mason Cox	2016	24	25	44	52	44	52

=== Squad changes ===
==== In ====
No.	Name	Position	Previous club	via
9	(Victoria (state)) Sam Murray	Defender	Sydney	trade
35	(Victoria (state)) Jaidyn Stephenson	Midfielder	Eastern Ranges	AFL National Draft, first round (pick No. 6)
28	(Victoria (state)) Nathan Murphy	Forward	Sandringham Dragons	AFL National Draft, third round (pick No. 39)
34	(Victoria (state)) Tyler Brown	Midfielder	Eastern Ranges	AFL National Draft, third round (pick No. 50), Father–son rule selection - son of Gavin Brown
31	(Victoria (state)) Flynn Appleby	Defender	Greater Western Victoria Rebels	AFL Rookie Draft, first round (pick No. 6)
41	(Tasmania) Brody Mihocek	Defender	Port Melbourne	AFL Rookie Draft, second round (pick No. 22)
43	(Queensland) Adam Oxley	Defender	Collingwood	AFL Rookie Draft, third round (pick No. 33)
44	(South Australia) Jack Madgen	Defender	Delta State University	Category B rookie selection

==== Out ====
No.	Name	Position	New Club	via
23	(Queensland) Lachlan Keeffe	Defender		delisted
34	(Victoria (state)) Mitch McCarthy	Ruck		delisted
41	(Tasmania) Henry Schade	Defender		delisted
44	(South Australia) Liam Mackie	Defender		delisted
28	(Victoria (state)) Ben Sinclair	Midfielder		retired
31	(Western Australia) Jackson Ramsay	Defender		delisted
43	(Queensland) Adam Oxley	Defender		delisted

== AFL season ==
=== Pre-season matches ===
Collingwood's 2018 AFLX competition fixtures
Date and local time	Opponent	Scores^{[a]}			Venue	Attendance	Ref
Date and local time	Opponent	Home	Away	Result	Venue	Attendance	Ref
Thursday, 15 February (6:38 pm)	Adelaide	2.7.3 (65)	1.3.9 (37)	Lost by 28 points	Coopers Stadium [A]	10,253	
Thursday, 15 February (8:30 pm)	West Coast	3.3.4 (52)	0.5.7 (37)	Won by 15 points	Coopers Stadium [A]	10,253	

Collingwood's 2018 JLT Community Series fixtures
Date and local time	Opponent	Scores^{[a]}			Venue	Attendance	Ref
Date and local time	Opponent	Home	Away	Result	Venue	Attendance	Ref
Thursday, 1 March (7:10 pm)	Greater Western Sydney	14.12 (96)	5.6 (36)	Lost by 60 points	UNSW Canberra Oval [A]	6,642	
Saturday, 10 March (2:05 pm)	Western Bulldogs	16.17 (113)	12.8 (80)	Won by 33 points	Ted Summerton Reserve [H]	3,442	

=== Regular season ===
Collingwood's 2018 AFL season fixtures
Round	Date and local time	Opponent	Home	Away	Result	Venue	Attendance	Ladder position	Ref
Round	Date and local time	Opponent	Scores^{[a]}			Venue	Attendance	Ladder position	Ref
1	Saturday, 24 March (7:25 pm)	Hawthorn	15.11 (101)	9.13 (67)	Lost by 34 points	MCG [A]	58,051	16th	
2	Saturday, 31 March (4:35 pm)	Greater Western Sydney	12.7 (79)	15.5 (95)	Lost by 16 points	MCG [H]	30,941	16th	
3	Friday, 6 April (7:50 pm)	Carlton	11.10 (76)	16.4 (100)	Won by 24 points	MCG [A]	68,548	14th	
4	Friday, 13 April (7:20 pm)	Adelaide	9.4 (58)	16.10 (106)	Won by 48 points	Adelaide Oval [A]	45,495	10th	
5	Wednesday, 25 April (3:20 pm)	Essendon	14.17 (101)	7.10 (52)	Won by 49 points	MCG [H]	91,440	5th	
6	Sunday, 29 April (3:20 pm)	Richmond	10.10 (70)	16.17 (113)	Lost by 43 points	MCG [H]	72,157	10th	
7	Sunday, 6 May (4:40 pm)	Brisbane Lions	18.6 (114)	19.7 (121)	Won by 7 points	Gabba [A]	21,850	9th	
8	Sunday, 13 May (3:20 pm)	Geelong	5.15 (45)	9.12 (66)	Lost by 21 points	MCG [H]	44,602	11th	
9	Saturday, 19 May (7:25 pm)	St Kilda	10.12 (72)	15.10 (100)	Won by 28 points	Etihad Stadium [A]	33,994	10th	
10	Friday, 25 May (7:50 pm)	Western Bulldogs	13.12 (90)	8.7 (55)	Won by 35 points	Etihad Stadium [H]	37,985	8th	
11	Sunday, 3 June (3:20 pm)	Fremantle	21.12 (138)	12.5 (77)	Won by 61 points	MCG [H]	34,542	7th	
12	Monday, 11 June (3:20 pm)	Melbourne	14.7 (91)	20.13 (133)	Won by 42 points	MCG [A]	83,518	6th	
13	Bye							6th	
14	Sunday, 24 June (3:20 pm)	Carlton	11.13 (79)	5.9 (59)	Won by 20 points	MCG [H]	53,706	4th	
15	Saturday, 30 June (7:25 pm)	Gold Coast	8.12 (60)	14.15 (99)	Won by 39 points	Metricon Stadium [A]	13,637	2nd	
16	Sunday, 8 July (3:20 pm)	Essendon	9.8 (62)	12.6 (78)	Won by 16 points	MCG [A]	69,868	2nd	
17	Sunday, 15 July (1:10 pm)	West Coast	9.13 (67)	15.12 (102)	Lost by 35 points	MCG [H]	53,439	3rd	
18	Saturday, 21 July (1:45 pm)	North Melbourne	20.10 (130)	9.10 (64)	Won by 66 points	MCG [H]	50,393	3rd	
19	Saturday, 28 July (1:45 pm)	Richmond	16.9 (105)	12.5 (77)	Lost by 28 points	MCG [A]	88,180	3rd	
20	Saturday, 4 August (7:25 pm)	Sydney	11.7 (73)	10.11 (71)	Lost by 2 points	SCG [A]	39,238	6th	
21	Saturday, 11 August (7:25 pm)	Brisbane Lions	14.20 (104)	11.7 (73)	Won by 31 points	Etihad Stadium [H]	33,390	5th	
22	Saturday, 18 August (1:45 pm)	Port Adelaide	17.13 (115)	10.4 (64)	Won by 51 points	MCG [H]	46,286	3rd	
23	Saturday, 25 August (2:35 pm)	Fremantle	9.13 (67)	11.10 (76)	Won by 9 points	Perth Stadium [A]	41,320	3rd	

=== Finals series ===
Collingwood's 2018 AFL finals series fixtures
Round	Date and local time	Opponent	Home	Away	Result	Venue	Attendance	Ref
Round	Date and local time	Opponent	Scores^{[a]}			Venue	Attendance	Ref
2nd Qualifying Final	Saturday, 8 September (6:10 pm)	West Coast	12.14 (86)	10.10 (70)	Lost by 16 points	Perth Stadium [A]	59,585	
2nd Semi-Final	Saturday, 15 September (7:25 pm)	Greater Western Sydney	9.15 (69)	9.5 (59)	Won by 10 points	MCG [H]	72,504	
1st Preliminary Final	Friday, 21 September (7:50 pm)	Richmond	8.10 (58)	15.7 (97)	Won by 39 points	MCG [A]	94,959	
Grand Final	Saturday, 29 September (2:30 pm)	West Coast	11.13 (79)	11.8 (74)	Lost by 5 points	MCG [A]	100,022	

=== Ladder ===
Pos	Team	Pld	W	L	D	PF	PA	PP	Pts	Qualification
1	Richmond	22	18	4	0	2143	1574	136.1	72	2018 finals
2	West Coast (P)	22	16	6	0	2012	1657	121.4	64	2018 finals
3	Collingwood	22	15	7	0	2046	1699	120.4	60	2018 finals
4	Hawthorn	22	15	7	0	1972	1642	120.1	60	2018 finals
5	Melbourne	22	14	8	0	2299	1749	131.4	56	2018 finals
6	Sydney	22	14	8	0	1822	1664	109.5	56	2018 finals
7	Greater Western Sydney	22	13	8	1	1898	1661	114.3	54	2018 finals
8	Geelong	22	13	9	0	2045	1554	131.6	52	2018 finals
9	North Melbourne	22	12	10	0	1950	1790	108.9	48	
10	Port Adelaide	22	12	10	0	1780	1654	107.6	48	
11	Essendon	22	12	10	0	1932	1838	105.1	48	
12	Adelaide	22	12	10	0	1941	1865	104.1	48	
13	Western Bulldogs	22	8	14	0	1575	2037	77.3	32	
14	Fremantle	22	8	14	0	1556	2041	76.2	32	
15	Brisbane Lions	22	5	17	0	1825	2049	89.1	20	
16	St Kilda	22	4	17	1	1606	2125	75.6	18	
17	Gold Coast	22	4	18	0	1308	2182	59.9	16	
18	Carlton	22	2	20	0	1353	2282	59.3	8	

Source: AFL
Rules for classification: 1) points; 2) percentage; 3) number of points for.
(P) Premiers

=== Awards & Milestones ===
==== AFL Awards ====
- Anzac Medal – Adam Treloar (Round 5)
- Neale Daniher Trophy – Mason Cox (Round 12)
- 2018 22under22 selection – Jordan De Goey
- 2018 22under22 selection – Jaidyn Stephenson
- 2018 22under22 selection – Tom Phillips
- 2018 AFL Rising Star – Jaidyn Stephenson
- 2018 All-Australian team – Brodie Grundy, Steele Sidebottom

==== AFL Award Nominations ====
- Round 3 – 2018 AFL Rising Star nomination – Sam Murray
- Round 4 – 2018 AFL Rising Star nomination – Jaidyn Stephenson
- 2018 All-Australian team 40-man squad – Jordan De Goey, Brodie Grundy, Scott Pendlebury, Steele Sidebottom

==== Club Awards ====
- E.W. Copeland Trophy – Steele Sidebottom & Brodie Grundy
- J.J. Joyce Trophy – Scott Pendlebury
- J.F. McHale Trophy – Jack Crisp
- Jack Regan Trophy – Taylor Adams
- Joseph Wren Memorial Trophy – Marty Hore
- Darren Millane Memorial Trophy – Lynden Dunn
- Harry Collier Trophy – Jaidyn Stephenson
- Gordon Coventry Trophy – Jordan De Goey
- Gavin Brown Award – Jack Crisp
- Bob Rose Award – Taylor Adams

==== Milestones ====
- Round 1 – Sam Murray (AFL debut)
- Round 1 – Jaidyn Stephenson (AFL debut)
- Round 3 – Taylor Adams (100 AFL games)
- Round 3 – Travis Varcoe (50 Collingwood games)
- Round 6 – Flynn Appleby (AFL debut)
- Round 7 – Darcy Moore (50 games)
- Round 7 – Adam Treloar (50 Collingwood games)
- Round 9 – Josh Thomas (50 games)
- Round 9 – Jeremy Howe (50 Collingwood games)
- Round 9 – Jordan De Goey (50 goals)
- Round 11 – Brody Mihocek (AFL debut)
- Round 15 – Brayden Sier (AFL debut)
- Round 15 – Josh Thomas (50 goals)
- Round 16 – Steele Sidebottom (200 games)
- Round 16 – Levi Greenwood (50 Collingwood games)
- Round 17 – Jack Crisp (100 AFL games)
- Round 18 – Will Hoskin-Elliott (50 Collingwood goals)
- Round 19 – Brodie Grundy (100 games)
- Round 20 – Jack Madgen (AFL debut)
- Round 21 – Chris Mayne (200 AFL goals)
- Round 22 – Nathan Murphy (AFL debut)
- Round 22 – Travis Varcoe (200 AFL games)
- Semi-Final – Will Hoskin-Elliott (100 AFL goals)
- Preliminary Final – Mason Cox (50 goals)
- Grand Final – Will Hoskin-Elliott (100 AFL games)
- Grand Final – Tom Phillips (50 games)

== VFL season ==
=== Pre-season matches ===
Collingwood's 2018 VFL pre-season fixture
Date and local time	Opponent	Home	Away	Result	Venue	Ref
Date and local time	Opponent	Scores^{[a]}			Venue	Ref
Thursday, 8 March (6:00 pm)	Richmond	13.7 (85)	11.9 (75)	Lost by 10 points	Punt Road Oval [A]	
Friday, 16 March (7:00 pm)	Coburg	8.16 (64)	8.5 (53)	Won by 11 points	Holden Centre [H]	
Friday, 23 March (2:30 pm)	Box Hill	13.11 (89)	9.13 (66)	Won by 23 points	Holden Centre [H]	
Saturday, 31 March (6:30 pm)	North Melbourne	9.12 (66)	16.7 (103)	Lost by 37 points	Holden Centre [H]	

=== Regular season ===
Collingwood's 2018 VFL season fixture
Round	Date and local time	Opponent	Home	Away	Result	Venue	Ladder position	Ref
Round	Date and local time	Opponent	Scores^{[a]}			Venue	Ladder position	Ref
1	Saturday, 7 April (2:00 pm)	Northern Blues	11.5 (71)	31.15 (201)	Won by 130 points	Preston City Oval [A]	2nd	
2	Saturday, 14 April (2:00 pm)	Port Melbourne	9.9 (63)	7.5 (47)	Lost by 16 points	North Port Oval [A]	5th	
3	Saturday, 21 April (2:10 pm)	Essendon	16.10 (106)	12.6 (78)	Won by 28 points	Victoria Park [H]	2nd	
4	Bye						5th	
5	Sunday, 6 May (3:00 pm)	Werribee	8.9 (57)	16.14 (110)	Won by 53 points	Avalon Airport Oval [A]	2nd	
6	Sunday, 13 May (11:30 am)	Geelong	13.13 (91)	13.9 (87)	Won by 4 points	Holden Centre [H]	2nd	
7	Saturday, 19 May (2:10 pm)	Coburg	7.5 (47)	10.12 (72)	Won by 25 points	Piranha Park [A]	2nd	
8	Saturday, 26 May (11:00 am)	Footscray	9.9 (63)	15.5 (95)	Won by 32 points	Whitten Oval [A]	2nd	
9	Sunday, 3 June (5:30 pm)	Richmond	6.11 (47)	17.13 (115)	Lost by 68 points	Holden Centre [H]	3rd	
10	Saturday, 9 June (1:00 pm)	Casey	11.10 (76)	8.5 (53)	Lost by 23 points	Casey Fields [A]	5th	
11	Bye						6th	
12	Sunday, 24 June (11:30 am)	Northern Blues	10.12 (72)	11.10 (76)	Lost by 4 points	Holden Centre [H]	6th	
13	Saturday, 1 July (2:00 pm)	Williamstown	13.13 (91)	9.7 (61)	Lost by 30 points	Burbank Oval [A]	8th	
14	Sunday, 8 July (5:30 pm)	Werribee	15.14 (104)	6.10 (46)	Won by 58 points	Holden Centre [H]	6th	
15	Bye						7th	
16	Saturday, 21 July (11:00 am)	Essendon	11.6 (72)	14.14 (98)	Won by 26 points	Windy Hill [A]	6th	
17	Sunday, 29 July (1:00 pm)	North Melbourne	9.8 (62)	10.10 (70)	Won by 8 points	Avalon Airport Oval [A]	5th	
18	Sunday, 5 August (2:00 pm)	Box Hill	12.7 (79)	9.18 (72)	Lost by 7 points	Box Hill City Oval [A]	6th	
19	Saturday, 11 August (7:00 pm)	Port Melbourne	9.14 (68)	10.10 (70)	Won by 2 points	Stannards Stadium [A]	6th	
20	Sunday, 19 August (1:00 pm)	Frankston	20.17 (137)	1.4 (10)	Won by 127 points	Victoria Park [H]	5th	
21	Saturday, 25 August (11:00 am)	Sandringham	18.14 (122)	8.11 (59)	Won by 63 points	Victoria Park [H]	5th	

=== Finals series ===
Collingwood's 2018 VFL finals series fixture
Round	Date and local time	Opponent	Home	Away	Result	Venue	Ref
Round	Date and local time	Opponent	Scores^{[a]}			Venue	Ref
2nd Elimination Final	Sunday, 2 September (2:10 pm)	Essendon	11.14 (80)	18.6 (114)	Lost by 34 points	Stannards Stadium [H]	
Collingwood was eliminated from the 2018 VFL finals series

=== Ladder ===
Pos	Team	Pld	W	L	D	PF	PA	PP	Pts	Qualification
1	Richmond	18	14	4	0	1911	1198	159.5	56	Finals series
2	Casey Demons	18	14	4	0	1593	1128	141.2	56	Finals series
3	Geelong	18	13	5	0	1574	1074	146.6	52	Finals series
4	Williamstown	18	13	5	0	1496	1171	127.8	52	Finals series
5	Collingwood	18	12	6	0	1628	1220	133.4	48	Finals series
6	Box Hill (P)	18	12	6	0	1634	1288	126.9	48	Finals series
7	Port Melbourne	18	10	8	0	1536	1436	107.0	40	Finals series
8	Essendon	18	9	9	0	1502	1237	121.4	36	Finals series
9	Footscray	18	8	10	0	1378	1442	95.6	32	
10	North Melbourne	18	8	10	0	1436	1696	84.7	32	
11	Werribee	18	7	11	0	1488	1680	88.6	28	
12	Northern Blues	18	6	12	0	1256	1643	76.4	24	
13	Sandringham	18	5	12	1	1317	1593	82.7	22	
14	Frankston	18	2	16	0	964	2068	46.6	8	
15	Coburg	18	1	16	1	1116	1955	57.1	6	

Updated to match(es) played on 23 August 2018. Source: SportsTG
Rules for classification: 1) points; 2) percentage; 3) number of points for.

== Women's season ==
=== Pre-season matches ===
Collingwood's 2018 AFLW pre-season fixture
Date and local time	Opponent	Home	Away	Result	Venue	Ref
Date and local time	Opponent	Scores^{[a]}			Venue	Ref
Friday, 19 January (7:30 pm)	Melbourne	7.4 (46)	6.7 (43)	Won by 3 points	Holden Centre [H]	

=== Regular season ===
Collingwood's 2018 AFL Women's season fixture
Round	Date and local time	Opponent	Home	Away	Result	Venue	Attendance	Ladder position	Ref
Round	Date and local time	Opponent	Scores^{[a]}			Venue	Attendance	Ladder position	Ref
1	Friday, 2 February (7:40 pm)	Carlton	3.4 (22)	2.2 (14)	Lost by 8 points	Ikon Park [A]	19,852	6th	
2	Saturday, 10 February (4:10 pm)	Fremantle	6.4 (40)	4.3 (27)	Lost by 13 points	Optus Stadium [A]	41,975	6th	
3	Sunday, 18 February (4:35 pm)	Greater Western Sydney	5.5 (35)	7.6 (48)	Lost by 13 points	Holden Centre [H]	3,600	8th	
4	Saturday, 24 February (5:40 pm)	Melbourne	3.6 (24)	9.4 (58)	Won by 34 points	TIO Traeger Park [A]	2,000	8th	
5	Sunday, 4 March (2:35 pm)	Western Bulldogs	6.5 (41)	7.7 (49)	Lost by 8 points	Ted Summerton Reserve [H]	2,700	8th	
6	Saturday, 10 March (3:35 pm)	Brisbane	5.9 (39)	8.5 (53)	Won by 14 points	Moreton Bay Central Sports Complex [A]	2,600	6th	
7	Sunday, 18 March (2:35 pm)	Adelaide	8.5 (53)	4.8 (32)	Won by 21 points	Holden Centre [H]	2,300	6th	

=== Ladder ===
Pos	Team	Pld	W	L	D	PF	PA	PP	Pts	Qualification
1	Western Bulldogs (P)	7	5	2	0	312	219	142.5	20	Grand Final
2	Brisbane	7	4	3	0	248	196	126.5	16	Grand Final
3	Melbourne	7	4	3	0	278	240	115.8	16	
4	Greater Western Sydney	7	3	3	1	224	242	92.6	14	
5	Adelaide	7	3	3	1	230	249	92.4	14	
6	Collingwood	7	3	4	0	281	254	110.6	12	
7	Fremantle	7	3	4	0	230	256	89.8	12	
8	Carlton	7	2	5	0	173	320	54.1	8	

Source: AFL.com.au
Rules for classification: 1) points; 2) percentage; 3) number of points for.
(P) Premiers

=== Squad ===
Players are listed by guernsey number, and 2018 statistics are for AFL Women's regular season and finals series matches during the 2018 AFL Women's season only. Career statistics include a player's complete AFL Women's career, which, as a result, means that a player's debut and part or whole of their career statistics may be for another club. Statistics are correct as of Round 7 of the 2018 season (18 March 2018) and are taken from Australian Football.

No.	Name	AFLW debut	Games (2018)	Goals (2018)	Games (CFC)	Goals (CFC)	Games (AFLW career)	Goals (AFLW career)
1	Caitlyn Edwards	2017	7	4	14	6	14	6
2	Chloe Molloy	2018	7	1	7	1	7	1
4	Sarah D'Arcy	2017	5	0	12	2	12	2
5	Emma Grant	2017	7	0	14	1	14	1
6	Christina Bernardi	2017	7	9	13	11	13	11
7	Lauren Tesoriero	2017	6	1	11	1	11	1
8	Brittany Bonnici	2017	7	1	14	1	14	1
9	Melissa Kuys	2017	7	2	13	2	13	2
10	Ashleigh Brazill	2018	2	0	2	0	2	0
11	Eliza Hynes	2018	2	0	2	0	2	0
12	Stacey Livingstone	2017	2	0	9	0	9	0
13	Jaimee Lambert	2017 (Western Bulldogs)	7	1	7	1	13	6
17	Steph Chiocci (c)	2017	5	2	12	3	12	3
18	Ruby Schleicher	2017	5	0	10	0	10	0
19	Georgie Parker	2018	2	0	2	0	2	0
20	Cecilia McIntosh	2017	7	0	13	1	13	1
21	Iilish Ross	2018	5	0	5	0	5	0
22	Sophie Casey	2017	3	0	8	1	8	1
23	Moana Hope	2017	6	8	13	15	13	15
25	Meg Hutchins	2017	5	3	12	3	12	3
26	Tara Morgan	2017	4	0	11	0	11	0
27	Jess Duffin	2017	6	1	13	7	13	7
28	Holly Whitford	2018	3	0	3	0	3	0
33	Bree White	2017	4	0	11	1	11	1
34	Darcy Guttridge	****	0	0	0	0	0	0
38	Amelia Barden	2017	7	3	14	3	14	3
41	Kristy Stratton	2018	2	0	2	0	2	0
43	Jasmine Garner	2017	7	5	14	10	14	10
46	Sarah Dargan	2018	3	0	3	0	3	0
60	Emma King	2017	7	1	14	1	14	1

==== Squad changes ====
In

No.	Name	Position	Previous club	via
11	(Victoria (state)) Eliza Hynes	Ruck / Forward		rookie signing
13	(Victoria (state)) Jaimee Lambert	Midfielder	Western Bulldogs	trade
19	(South Australia) Georgie Parker	Utility		rookie signing
2	(Victoria (state)) Chloe Molloy	Forward	Diamond Creek	AFLW National Draft, first round (pick No. 3)
34	(Victoria (state)) Darcy Guttridge	Defender / Midfielder	Cranbourne	AFLW National Draft, second round (pick No. 9)
21	(Victoria (state)) Iilish Ross	Defender	Murray Bushrangers	AFLW National Draft, second round (pick No. 13)
46	(Victoria (state)) Sarah Dargan	Forward	Calder Cannons	AFLW National Draft, third round (pick No. 20)
41	(Victoria (state)) Kristy Stratton	Midfielder	Box Hill Hawks	AFLW National Draft, third round (pick No. 21)
10	(New South Wales) Ashleigh Brazill	Defender	Collingwood Magpies Netball	AFLW National Draft, fifth round (pick No. 35)
28	(Victoria (state)) Holly Whitford	Midfielder / Forward	Cranbourne	AFLW Rookie Draft, pick No. 4

Out

No.	Name	Position	New Club	via
10	(Canada) Kendra Heil	Defender		delisted
24	(Victoria (state)) Kate Sheahan	Utility		delisted
21	(Victoria (state)) Nicola Stevens	Defender	Carlton	trade
2	(Victoria (state)) Alicia Eva	Midfielder / Forward	Greater Western Sydney	trade
3	(Victoria (state)) Penny Cula-Reid	Defender		delisted
11	(Victoria (state)) Helen Roden	Forward		delisted
19	(Victoria (state)) Lou Wotton	Ruck		delisted
31	(Victoria (state)) Georgia Walker	Defender		delisted
33	(Victoria (state)) Bree White	Midfielder		retired
25	(Victoria (state)) Meg Hutchins	Defender	Hawthorn VFLW	delisted

=== League awards ===
- Rising Star – Chloe Molloy

=== Club Awards ===
- Best and fairest – Chloe Molloy
- Leading goalkicker – Christina Bernardi (9 goals)
- VFLW best and fairest - Jaimee Lambert

=== VFL Women's ===
In 2018, Collingwood fielded a team in the VFL Women's League for the first time. Most of Collingwood's AFL Women's list play for the club in the VFLW, though the majority of the team is made up of players who haven't been drafted to an AFLW club. The team won the minor premiership, though would go on to lose in the preliminary final to Geelong.

== Notes ==
Key

- H Home match.
- A Away match.

Notes

- **^{a}** Collingwood's scores are indicated in **bold** font.
