= Nathan Murphy (footballer) =

Australian rules footballer (born 1999)

Personal information
- Born: 15 December 1999 (age 26)
- Original teams: Sandringham Dragons (TAC Cup); Brighton Grammar
- Draft: No. 39, 2017 national draft
- Debut: 18 August 2018, Collingwood vs. Port Adelaide, at MCG
- Height: 192 cm (6 ft 4 in)
- Weight: 90 kg (198 lb)
- Position: Defender

Playing career^{1}
Years	Club	Games (Goals)
2018–2023	Collingwood	57 (1)
- ^{1} Playing statistics correct to the end of the 2023 season.

Career highlights
- AFL premiership player: 2023

Nathan Murphy (born 15 December 1999) is a former professional Australian rules footballer who played for the Collingwood Football Club in the Australian Football League (AFL).

In his youth, Murphy had promising cricket and football careers. He played school cricket for Brighton Grammar, state cricket for Victoria, and national under-16 cricket for Australia. Murphy represented Brighton Grammar and the Sandringham Dragons in football. In July 2017, he decided to focus on football, and he was viewed as a top-30 prospect in the 2017 AFL national draft. Murphy was selected by Collingwood with pick 39 and made his AFL debut in round 22 of the 2018 AFL season against Port Adelaide.

== Junior career ==
=== Cricket ===
Murphy focused on cricket in his junior career, playing as a wicket-keeper and batsman. He played for East Sandringham at 14 and represented Brighton Grammar School. In March 2015, Murphy played state cricket for Victoria's under-15 team. He represented Australia's under-16 side against Pakistan in a twelve-match series, and he went on to play state cricket for Victoria's under-17 and under-19 teams.

=== Football ===
Murphy played for South Metro's under-15 team and won player of the carnival in 2014. In 2016, he represented Brighton Grammar's senior side as a Year 11 student, playing as an intercepting defender. In 2017, Murphy moved to the forward line and attracted attention from recruiters after kicking seven goals in a match against Geelong Grammar School. In July, he decided to pursue an AFL career over cricket, although said he was open to switching back. Murphy was listed with TAC Cup club Sandringham Dragons, averaging 16 disposals in eight games playing as a midfielder and a forward. He suffered an ankle injury late in his season. In September, Murphy played in the Under-18 All Stars curtain raiser for the 2017 AFL Grand Final. He tested at the 2017 AFL Draft Combine in October and ran the eighth-best 2 km (1.2 mi) time trial with a time of 6.21 minutes. Murphy was seen by recruiters as a likely top-30 pick at the upcoming 2017 AFL national draft. He was linked with Sydney and the Western Bulldogs.

== AFL career ==
Murphy was selected by Collingwood with pick 39 in the 2017 national draft. Australian cricketer Shane Warne rang Collingwood president Eddie McGuire to commend the decision. Commenting on his selection, Murphy said, "To land at a club like Collingwood so that I can stay home with the family, it's the best possible outcome." Collingwood recruiting manager Derek Hine said the club considered selecting Murphy with pick 6 – their first selection, ultimately used to take 2018 AFL Rising Star Jaidyn Stephenson – and would have traded future picks to select him at the end of the first round. However, live pick trading was not available at the 2017 draft.

In 2018, Murphy played for Collingwood against West Coast in the inaugural AFLX pre-season tournament. He played as a defender and a forward for Collingwood's Victorian Football League (VFL) team. Murphy signed a one-year contract extension, keeping him at Collingwood until 2020. He had played every VFL game prior to signing the extension. Murphy made his AFL debut in the round 22 match against Port Adelaide at the Melbourne Cricket Ground. He was selected after Sam Murray was dropped for personal reasons, and finished with 14 disposals. Coach Nathan Buckley cited Murphy's strong VFL form as a reason for his selection. He was dropped from the team before Collingwood's qualifying final.

Murphy played in Collingwood's 2023 premiership, but he was knocked out in the first quarter in a ground contest with Brisbane's Lincoln McCarthy and played no further part in the game. In April 2024, during the beginning of the 2024 AFL season, Murphy retired following advice from the medical concussion panel. Collingwood paid out the remainder of his 2024 and 2025 contract in full to alleviate any immediate financial concerns as well as offering him an internal non-playing role within the club.

Murphy stayed at Collingwood in an off-field role, turning out as a developmental coach at the club.

== Personal life ==
Murphy is the son of Deborah and Shaun. He has two sisters: Jessica and Carly. Murphy is close friends with cricketer Will Sutherland, who also had to choose between football and cricket careers as a teenager.

== Statistics ==
Updated to the end of the 2023 season.

Legend
G	Goals	K	Kicks	D	Disposals	T	Tackles
B	Behinds	H	Handballs	M	Marks
#	Played in that season's premiership team

Season	Team	No.	Games	Totals							Averages (per game)							Votes
Season	Team	No.	Games	G	B	K	H	D	M	T	G	B	K	H	D	M	T	Votes
2018	Collingwood	28	2	0	0	13	10	23	5	3	0.0	0.0	6.5	5.0	11.5	2.5	1.5	0
2019	Collingwood	28	0	—	—	—	—	—	—	—	—	—	—	—	—	—	—	—
2020	Collingwood	28	0	—	—	—	—	—	—	—	—	—	—	—	—	—	—	—
2021	Collingwood	28	15	1	3	88	56	144	50	16	0.1	0.2	5.9	3.7	9.6	3.3	1.1	0
2022	Collingwood	28	16	0	0	116	46	162	52	19	0.0	0.0	7.3	2.9	10.1	3.3	1.2	0
2023^{#}	Collingwood	28	24	0	0	145	87	232	86	46	0.0	0.0	6.0	3.6	9.7	3.6	1.9	1
Career			57	1	3	362	199	561	193	84	0.0	0.1	6.4	3.5	9.8	3.4	1.5	1
