= Jack Henry (footballer, born 1998) =

Australian rules footballer

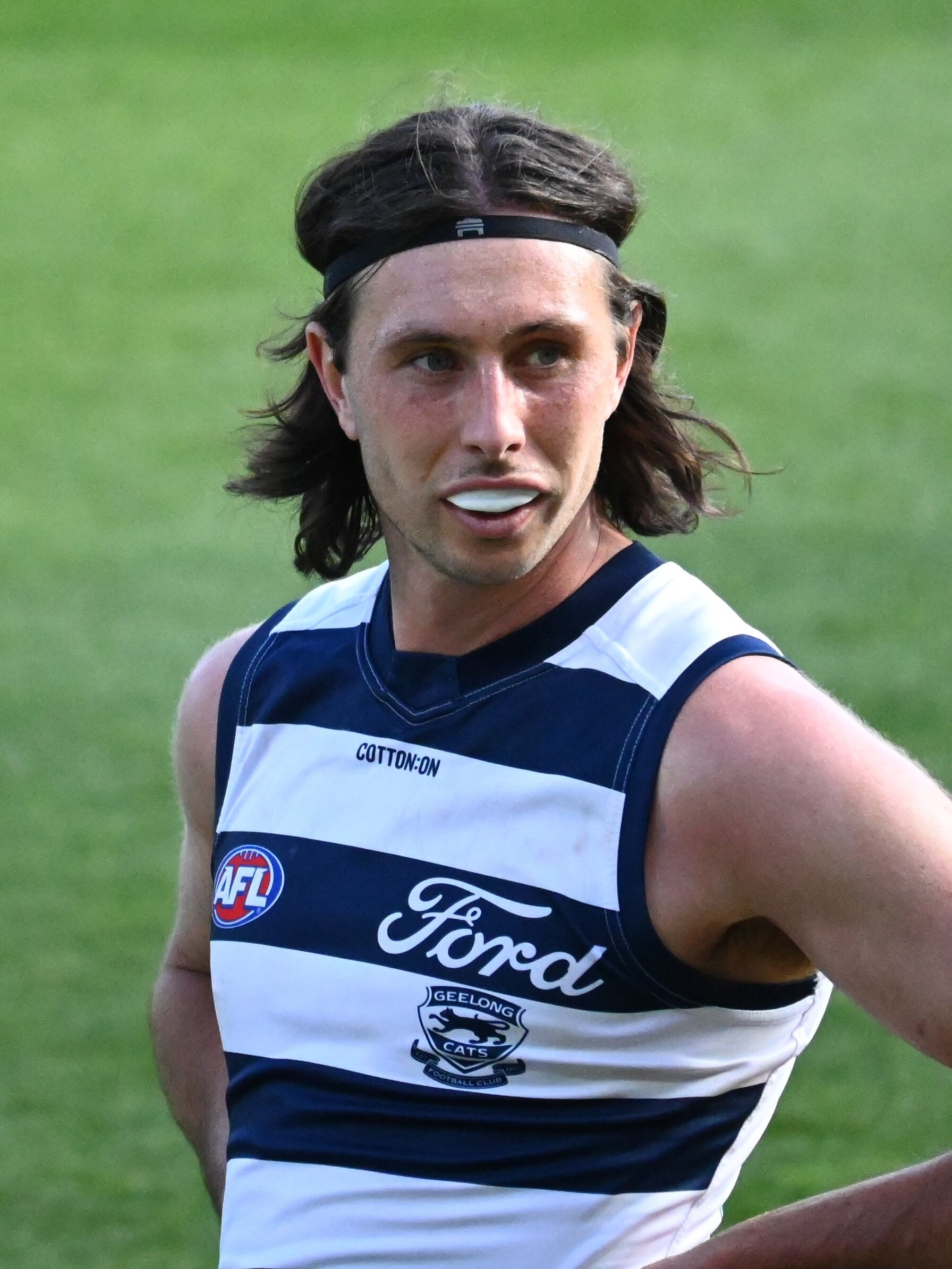
- Henry in April 2024

Personal information
- Born: 29 August 1998 (age 28)
- Original team: Geelong Falcons (NAB League)/St Mary's Sporting Club (Geelong Football League)
- Draft: No. 16, 2016 rookie draft
- Debut: Round 2, 2018, Geelong vs. Hawthorn, at MCG
- Height: 194 cm (6 ft 4 in)
- Weight: 91 kg (201 lb)
- Position: Key Defender

Club information
- Current club: Geelong
- Number: 38

Playing career^{1}
Years	Club	Games (Goals)
2018–	Geelong	185 (30)
- ^{1} Playing statistics correct to the end of 2026.

Career highlights
- AFL premiership player: 2022; AFL Rising Star nominee: 2018; Geelong best young player: 2018

Jack Henry (born 29 August 1998) is a professional Australian rules footballer playing for the Geelong Football Club in the Australian Football League (AFL). He was drafted by Geelong with their first selection and sixteenth overall in the 2016 rookie draft. He made his debut in the one point loss to Hawthorn at the Melbourne Cricket Ground in round two of the 2018 season. In his sixth match, he recorded eighteen disposals, eleven marks (including five intercept marks), and three tackles in the sixty-one point win against Greater Western Sydney in round seven to earn the round nomination for the 2018 AFL Rising Star. Henry moved forward in the second half of the 2018 AFL season and kicked 8 goals in a handful of games in the forward line, including a three-goal haul against Brisbane at GMHBA Stadium.

== Statistics ==
Updated to the end of round 22, 2026.

Legend
G	Goals	K	Kicks	D	Disposals	T	Tackles
B	Behinds	H	Handballs	M	Marks
#	Played in that season's premiership team

Season	Team	No.	Games	Totals							Averages (per game)							Votes
Season	Team	No.	Games	G	B	K	H	D	M	T	G	B	K	H	D	M	T	Votes
2018	Geelong	38	22	8	4	160	73	233	84	66	0.4	0.2	7.3	3.3	10.6	3.8	3.0	0
2019	Geelong	38	23	0	4	175	66	241	97	34	0.0	0.2	7.6	2.9	10.5	4.2	1.5	0
2020 (Note: The 2020 season was played with 17 home-and-away matches per team (down from 22) and 16-minute quarters with time on (down from 20-minute quarters with time on) due to the impact of the COVID-19 pandemic.)	Geelong	38	21	1	0	157	48	205	82	36	0.0	0.0	7.5	2.3	9.8	3.9	1.7	0
2021	Geelong	38	24	7	2	217	119	336	150	43	0.3	0.1	9.0	5.0	14.0	6.3	1.8	3
2022^{#}	Geelong	38	17	4	1	119	65	184	82	24	0.2	0.1	7.0	3.8	10.8	4.8	1.4	0
2023	Geelong	38	11	4	0	81	37	118	47	15	0.4	0.0	7.4	3.4	10.7	4.3	1.4	0
2024	Geelong	38	25	0	0	214	73	287	143	34	0.0	0.0	8.6	2.9	11.5	5.7	1.4	0
2025	Geelong	38	21	0	2	208	50	258	136	20	0.0	0.1	9.9	2.4	12.3	6.5	1.0	0
2026	Geelong	38	17	6	4	116	56	172	80	21	0.4	0.2	6.8	3.3	10.1	4.7	1.2	0
Career			181	30	17	1447	587	2034	901	293	0.2	0.1	8.0	3.2	11.2	5.0	1.6	3

== Honours and achievements ==
=== Team ===
- AFL premiership player (Geelong): 2022
- 2× McClelland Trophy (Geelong): 2019, 2022

=== Individual ===
- Geelong F.C. Best Young Player Award: 2018
- AFL Rising Star nominee: 2018 (round 7)
