= Andrew Phillips (footballer, born 1970) =

Australian rules footballer (born 1970)

Personal information
- Full name: Andrew Phillips
- Born: 27 January 1970 (age 56)
- Original team: Waverley Juniors/MHSOB
- Height: 178 cm (5 ft 10 in)
- Weight: 72 kg (159 lb)
- Position: Forward / midfield

Playing career^{1}
Years	Club	Games (Goals)
1989–1991	Carlton	42 (26)
- ^{1} Playing statistics correct to the end of 1991.

Andrew Phillips (born 27 January 1970) is a former Australian rules footballer who played for the Carlton Football Club in the Australian Football League (AFL).

Phillips's nephews Tom and Ed Phillips currently play in the AFL.
