= Nick Murray (footballer) =

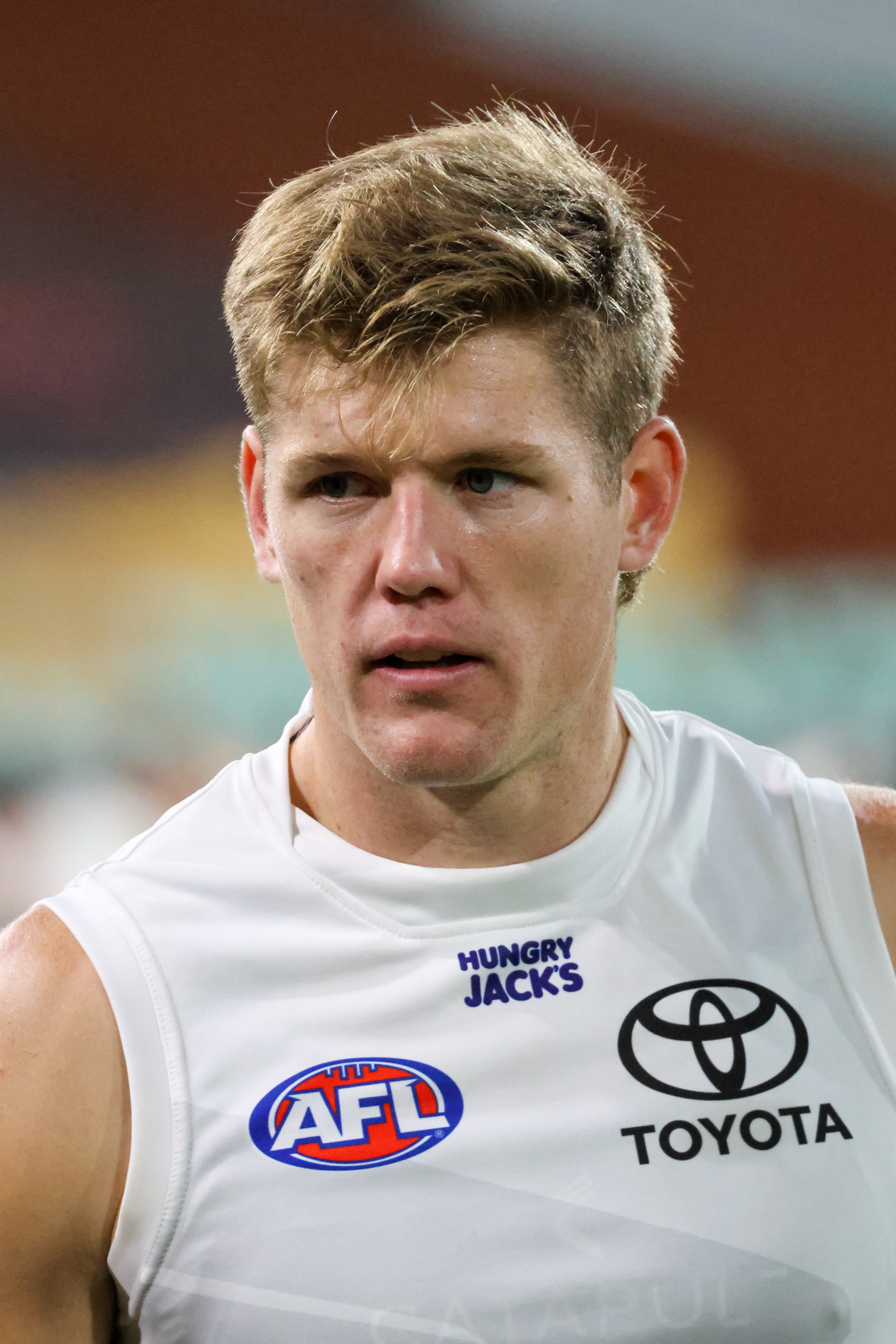
- Murray in 2026

Personal information
- Full name: Nicholas Murray
- Nickname: Muz
- Born: 18 December 2000 (age 25); New South Wales
- Original team: Henty (NSW)/Murray U18/Ganmain-Grong Grong Matong (NSW)/Wang Rovers (Vic)
- Draft: 2021 Preseason Supplemental Selection Period
- Debut: Round 2, 2021, Adelaide vs. Sydney, at Sydney Cricket Ground
- Height: 195 cm (6 ft 5 in)
- Weight: 100 kg (220 lb)
- Position: Key Defender

Club information
- Current club: Adelaide
- Number: 9

Playing career^{1}
Years	Club	Games (Goals)
2021–	Adelaide	78 (3)
- ^{1} Playing statistics correct to the end of round 22, 2026.

Career highlights
- 22under22 team 44-man squad: 2023

Nicholas Murray (born 18 December 2000) is an Australian rules footballer playing for the Adelaide Football Club in the Australian Football League (AFL). As a junior, Murray played for the Murray Bushrangers and the Greater Western Sydney Giants' reserves team. He was overlooked at the AFL draft for two seasons in a row before being signed to a rookie contract with Adelaide in early 2021 and making his AFL debut less than three weeks later. Murray has since become an integral part of Adelaide's backline.

== Early life and career ==
Murray is the younger brother of Sam Murray, who played 13 AFL matches for Collingwood before Murray began his career. He is also the older brother of Toby Murray, who is currently listed as a rookie for Adelaide. As a junior, Murray played 21 games for the Murray Bushrangers in the NAB League across the 2017 and 2018 seasons, becoming the team's co-captain. He became a member of the Greater Western Sydney Giants academy and played eight games for the Giants' reserves team in 2019 as a key defender and also played seven matches with Wangaratta Rovers in 2019.

Murray was overlooked in the 2019 AFL draft, then signed a contract to play for Williamstown in the Victorian Football League in 2020. Murray played for Williamstown in two practices matches against Port Melbourne Football Club and Footscray, but the 2020 VFL season was cancelled without a game being played due to the COVID-19 pandemic. Murray returned home to play for Ganmain-Grong Grong-Matong in the AFL Riverina Championship, where he was one of the standout performers. He predominantly played at centre-half-forward during the season and kicked 12 goals from seven games. His season came to an end when he injured his collarbone in a final. (Note: Sources describe this match against Mangoplah-Cookardinia United-Eastlakes as either a semi-final or an elimination final.) After he recovered from this injury, he did some pre-season training for 2021 with the Wangaratta Rovers.

== AFL career ==
Murray was overlooked for the second year in a row in the 2020 AFL draft, but in December while working at a family friend's farm he was invited to train with the Adelaide Football Club. Adelaide had one spot left open on their list and, unable to decide between Murray and their own delisted player Ayce Taylor, the club decided to give the two players the opportunity to train with the rest of the team during the pre-season to decide which player would join the team's list. Murray won out and signed a rookie contract with the team on 7 March 2021 as part of the pre-season supplemental selection period. Murray played in two pre-season games against Port Adelaide but was unavailable to make his debut in round one. In round two, less than three weeks after he officially joined Adelaide's list, Murray made his AFL debut against Sydney at the Sydney Cricket Ground, where he tagged four-time Coleman Medallist Lance Franklin. Former Adelaide player Stephen Rowe said of Murray's rise to the AFL: "It is remarkable. I doubt there will be a bigger football debut story than this one. Three weeks ago not on a list, six months ago playing for a 'buckle wheel league'. And now he's playing Buddy [Franklin]..."

Alongside fellow rookie Jordon Butts, Murray became an important part of the Crows' backline. In July, after playing just eight AFL games, the Crows gave him a two-year contract extension to keep him at the club until the end of 2023. Through the 2021 season, Murray played for Adelaide in a total of thirteen games, averaging nearly six spoils per game.

When Tom Doedee ruptured his ACL in round 12, 2023 against Gold Coast, Murray became Adelaide's first-choice key defender. He excelled in the role, becoming one of the highest-rated players in his role across the competition, until he himself ruptured his ACL in round 19 against Melbourne. His injury ended his season, opening the door for Mark Keane and James Borlase to make their club debuts. Murray's younger brother Toby was invited to play with Adelaide's SANFL squad following the 2023 season, and in May 2024, Toby was drafted as a rookie in the mid-season draft. Nick made his return to football through the SANFL where he played two games alongside his brother, and finally returned to the AFL for round 14 against Sydney. At the conclusion of the season, Murray swapped his 28 guernsey number for 9, recently vacated by club legend Rory Sloane.

== Statistics ==
Updated to the end of round 22, 2026.

Legend
G	Goals	K	Kicks	D	Disposals	T	Tackles
B	Behinds	H	Handballs	M	Marks

Season	Team	No.	Games	Totals							Averages (per game)							Votes
Season	Team	No.	Games	G	B	K	H	D	M	T	G	B	K	H	D	M	T	Votes
2021	Adelaide	28	13	1	1	70	20	90	29	18	0.1	0.1	5.4	1.5	6.9	2.2	1.4	0
2022	Adelaide	28	16	0	0	87	40	127	44	21	0.0	0.0	5.4	2.5	7.9	2.8	1.3	0
2023	Adelaide	28	17	0	1	114	52	166	67	12	0.0	0.1	6.7	3.1	9.8	3.9	0.7	0
2024	Adelaide	28	9	0	1	68	29	97	38	14	0.0	0.1	7.6	3.2	10.8	4.2	1.6	0
2025	Adelaide	9	12	0	0	64	37	101	41	12	0.0	0.0	5.3	3.1	8.4	3.4	1.0	0
2026	Adelaide	9	11	2	0	97	39	136	48	21	0.2	0.0	8.8	3.5	12.4	4.4	1.9	0
Career			78	3	3	500	217	717	267	98	0.0	0.0	6.4	2.8	9.2	3.4	1.3	0
