= Tom Phillips (Australian footballer) =

Australian rules footballer

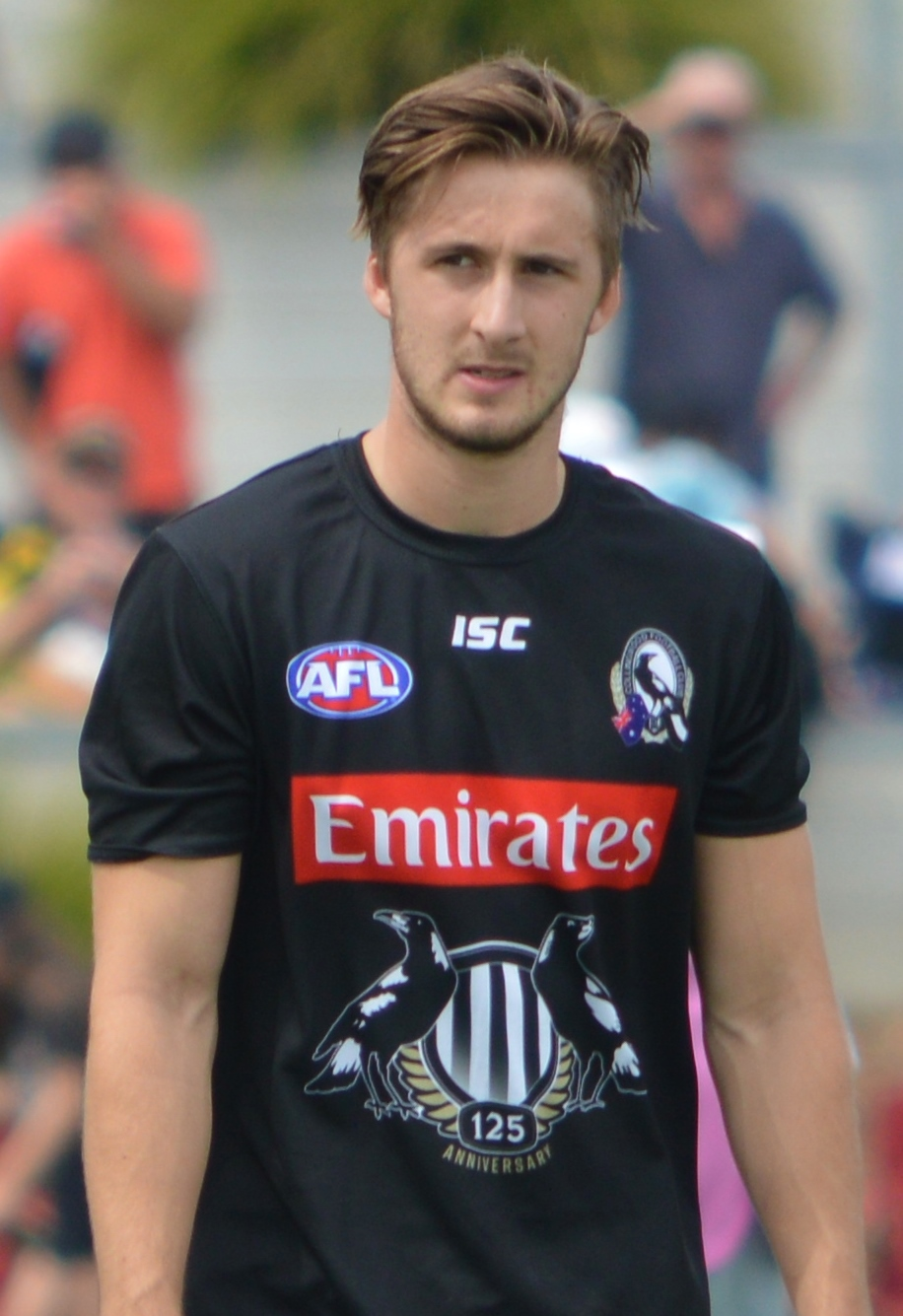
- Phillips warming up prior to a pre-season match in 2017

Personal information
- Full name: Tom Phillips
- Nickname: Flipper
- Born: 7 May 1996 (age 30); Melbourne, Victoria
- Original team: Oakleigh Chargers (TAC Cup)
- Draft: No. 58, 2015 national draft
- Height: 186 cm (6 ft 1 in)
- Weight: 75 kg (165 lb)
- Position: Winger

Playing career^{1}
Years	Club	Games (Goals)
2016–2020	Collingwood	89 (44)
2021–2022	Hawthorn	26 (13)
Total		115 (57)
- ^{1} Playing statistics correct to the end of the 2022 season.

Tom Phillips (born 7 May 1996) is an Australian rules footballer who most recently played for the Hawthorn Football Club in the Australian Football League (AFL).

== Early and personal life ==
Phillips grew up in Melbourne. He participated in the Auskick program at Milgate Primary School in Doncaster East, Victoria. He attended Caulfield Grammar School, where he excelled at Australian rules football and running. His uncle, Andrew Phillips played 42 games for Carlton. His younger brother Ed Phillips played for St Kilda.

== State football ==
Phillips played for the Oakleigh Chargers in the TAC Cup, appearing in 12 games and winning a premiership with them in the 2014 season. The next season he returned as an overage player, making the most of his final year in the development league. He kicked 23 goals in 16 games and selected as one of the best players half the time. In the Grand Final he tallied 18 disposals and kicked two goals to help them claim back-to-back premierships. In 2015, Phillips spent time with Victorian Football League (VFL) club Port Melbourne, collecting 20 disposals and laying six tackles against Collingwood, the club which would draft him to the Australian Football League (AFL).

== AFL career ==
After being overlooked in the 2014 national draft, Phillips was drafted by Collingwood with their 2nd pick of the 2015 national draft, which was the 58th pick overall. He impressed in pre-season during the annual time-trial beating "time-trial king" Steele Sidebottom. He made his debut for Collingwood in round 12 of the 2016, against Melbourne in the Queen's Birthday clash. Two rounds later, he scored his first goal, against Fremantle. Phillips was named the AFL Rising Star nominee for round 9 of the 2017 season, after gathering 24 disposals in Collingwood's comeback win over Hawthorn at the Melbourne Cricket Ground. In the 2018 season, Phillips was selected by the AFL Players Association for the 22 Under 22 team.

Following the 2020 season, Phillips along with Jaidyn Stephenson and Adam Treloar were put up for trade by Collingwood due to salary cap issues. Phillips would eventually be traded to Hawthorn in exchange for Pick 65 in the 2020 AFL draft.

Phillips played one pre-season game in the number 16 guernsey before the retirement of Tom Scully prior to the start of the 2021 AFL season allowed him to continue wearing his old number 21 for Hawthorn.

== Statistics ==
Updated to the end of the 2022 season.

Legend
G	Goals	K	Kicks	D	Disposals	T	Tackles
B	Behinds	H	Handballs	M	Marks

Season	Team	No.	Games	Totals							Averages (per game)							Votes
Season	Team	No.	Games	G	B	K	H	D	M	T	G	B	K	H	D	M	T	Votes
2016	Collingwood	21	6	3	4	57	45	102	33	17	0.5	0.7	9.5	7.5	17.0	5.5	2.8	0
2017	Collingwood	21	18	9	7	213	167	380	88	52	0.5	0.4	11.8	9.3	21.1	4.9	2.9	0
2018	Collingwood	21	26	15	8	391	273	664	147	62	0.6	0.3	15.0	10.5	25.5	5.7	2.4	0
2019	Collingwood	21	24	12	10	372	200	572	128	53	0.5	0.4	15.5	8.3	23.8	5.3	2.2	0
2020 (Note: The 2020 season was played with 17 home-and-away matches per team (down from 22) and 16-minute quarters with time on (down from 20-minute quarters with time on) due to the impact of the COVID-19 pandemic.)	Collingwood	21	15	5	7	141	104	245	46	35	0.3	0.5	9.4	6.9	16.3	3.1	2.3	2
2021	Hawthorn	21	22	13	5	241	165	406	93	47	0.6	0.2	11.0	7.5	18.5	4.2	2.1	0
2022	Hawthorn	21	4	0	0	20	17	37	11	13	0.0	0.0	5.0	4.3	9.3	2.8	3.3	0
Career			115	57	41	1435	971	2406	546	279	0.5	0.4	12.5	8.4	20.9	4.7	2.4	2

== Personal life ==
Phillips is studying for a Bachelor's degree in communication at Deakin University.

== Honours and achievements ==
Individual

- 22under22 team: 2018
- AFL Rising Star nominee: 2017
