= Ben Ronke =

Australian rules footballer

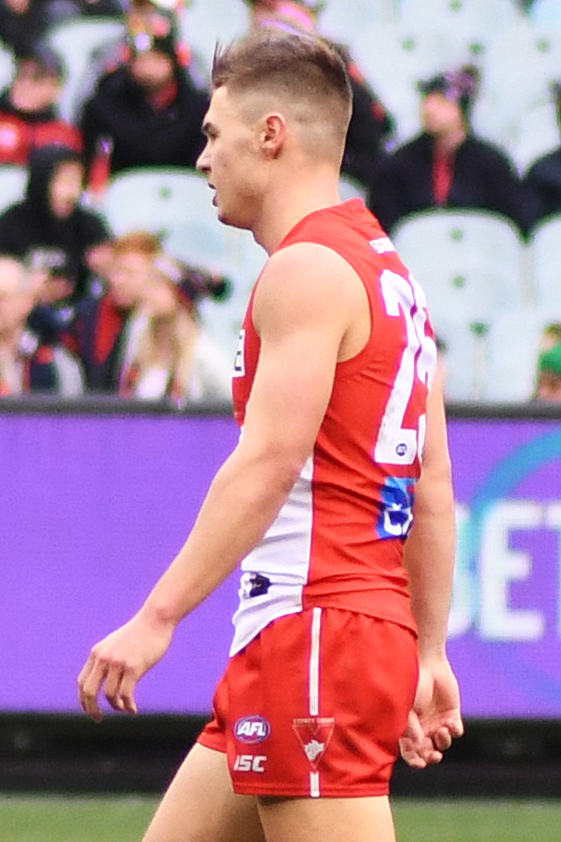
- Ronke playing for Sydney in August 2018

Personal information
- Full name: Benjamin Ronke
- Born: 18 December 1997 (age 28)
- Original team: Calder Cannons (TAC Cup)
- Draft: No. 17, 2017 rookie draft
- Debut: Round 6, 2018, Sydney vs. Geelong, at Simonds Stadium
- Height: 183 cm (6 ft 0 in)
- Weight: 77 kg (170 lb)
- Position: Forward

Playing career^{1}
Years	Club	Games (Goals)
2017–2022	Sydney	44 (39)
- ^{1} Playing statistics correct to the end of the 2022 season.

Career highlights
- AFL Rising Star nominee: 2018; 22under22 team: 2018

Benjamin Ronke (born 18 December 1997) is a former professional Australian rules footballer who played for the Sydney Swans in the Australian Football League (AFL). He was drafted by Sydney with their first selection and seventeenth overall in the 2017 rookie draft. He made his debut in the seventeen point win against Geelong at GMHBA Stadium kicking two goals in round six of the 2018 AFL season. In his third match, the Swans played against Hawthorn at the MCG, and Ronke became the first player to notch up seven goals and ten tackles in an AFL Match since the introduction of detailed statistics in the VFL/AFL in 1987. His performance in the match saw him earn the round 8 nomination for the 2018 AFL Rising Star.

== Statistics ==
Updated to the end of the 2022 season.

Legend
G	Goals	K	Kicks	D	Disposals	T	Tackles
B	Behinds	H	Handballs	M	Marks

Season	Team	No.	Games	Totals							Averages (per game)							Votes
Season	Team	No.	Games	G	B	K	H	D	M	T	G	B	K	H	D	M	T	Votes
2017	Sydney	25	0	–	–	–	–	–	–	–	–	–	–	–	–	–	–	–
2018	Sydney	25	18	24	9	150	78	228	45	71	1.3	0.5	8.3	4.3	12.7	2.5	3.9	5
2019	Sydney	25	13	9	8	86	49	135	36	28	0.7	0.6	6.6	3.8	10.4	2.8	2.2	0
2020 (Note: The 2020 season was played with 17 home-and-away matches per team (down from 22) and 16-minute quarters with time on (down from 20-minute quarters with time on) due to the impact of the COVID-19 pandemic.)	Sydney	25	3	0	0	19	10	29	6	11	0.0	0.0	6.3	3.3	9.7	2.0	3.7	0
2021	Sydney	25	2	0	0	2	3	5	1	0	0.0	0.0	1.0	1.5	2.5	0.5	0.0	0
2022	Sydney	25	8	6	5	43	29	72	16	11	0.8	0.6	5.4	3.6	9.0	2.0	1.4	0
Career			44	39	22	300	169	469	104	121	0.9	0.5	6.8	3.8	10.7	2.4	2.8	5

== Honours and achievements ==
Individual

- 22under22 team: 2018
- AFL Rising Star nominee: 2018 (round 8)
