= Toby Murray (footballer) =

Australian rules football (born 2003)

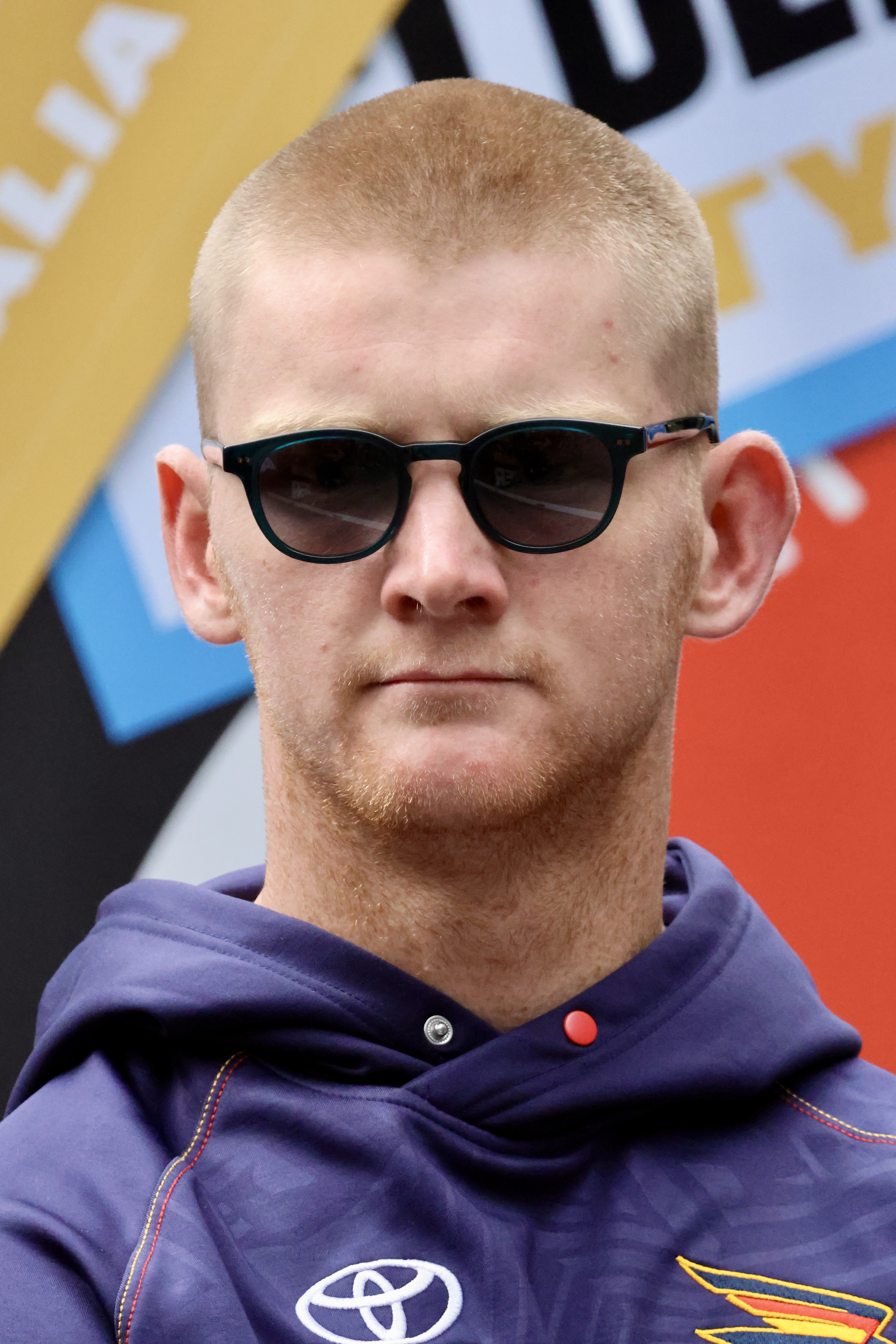
- Murray at Gather Round in 2026

Personal information
- Full name: Tobias Murray
- Nickname: "Ibis"
- Born: 3 November 2003 (age 23); New South Wales
- Original teams: Henty Football Club (HFNL); Murray Bushrangers (Talent League); Wangaratta Rovers (OMFNL); Collingwood's reserves team (VFL); Adelaide (SANFL)
- Draft: No. 7, 2024 mid-season draft
- Debut: Round 1, 2026, Adelaide vs. Collingwood, at Melbourne Cricket Ground
- Height: 201 cm (6 ft 7 in)
- Position: Ruck / key forward

Club information
- Current club: Adelaide
- Number: 39

Playing career^{1}
Years	Club	Games (Goals)
2026—	Adelaide	12 (9)
- ^{1} Playing statistics correct to the end of round 22, 2026.

Tobias Murray (born 3 November 2003) is an Australian rules footballer playing for the Adelaide Football Club in the Australian Football League (AFL).

Raised in Henty, New South Wales, Murray grew up playing his junior football with the Henty Football Club in the Hume Football Netball League (HFNL) alongside his brothers Sam and Nick. Throughout his under-18s campaign, he represented the Murray Bushrangers in the Talent League. Thereafter, he joined Collingwood's reserves team in 2022 in the Victoria Football League (VFL), playing one game at the level, and played for the Wangaratta Rovers in the Ovens & Murray Football Netball League (OMFNL) from 2022–2023.

Ahead of the 2024 SANFL season, Murray signed with the reserves team in the South Australian National Football League (SANFL). Following half a season at the level, he was drafted by Adelaide with pick 7 of the 2024 mid-season draft.

A 201cm ruck / key forward, Murray made his senior debut for Adelaide in Round 1 of the 2026 AFL season against Collingwood at the Melbourne Cricket Ground.

== Early life ==
Tobias Murray was born in New South Wales on 3 November 2003, as one of three children—Sam, a Collingwood Football Club footballer; and Nick, an Adelaide footballer; to Allison "Allie" Murray, a swim instructor, and Peter Murray, a former Australian rules footballer with the South Melbourne Swans reserves team (1977–1978). Murray's great-uncle is Bob Murray, a premiership player with the St Kilda Football Club.

Murray attended Henty Primary School in Henty, New South Wales. He grew up playing junior football for the Henty Football Club. During his time at the club, he received the nickname "Ibis", named for the long-legged bird. He played with the Murray Bushrangers in the Talent League during his draft year campaign in 2021.

== Career ==
=== VFL and SANFL career ===
Murray signed with the Collingwood reserves in the Victorian Football League (VFL) ahead of the 2022 VFL season, accruing one game at the level, alongside simultaneous commitments with the Bushrangers and the Wangaratta Rovers. Murray played for the Wangaratta Rovers in the Ovens & Murray Football Netball League (OMFNL) in 2023 before signing an 18-month contract with the Adelaide reserves in the South Australian National Football League (SANFL) prior to the 2024 SANFL season.

=== AFL career ===
On 29 May 2024, following half a season at SANFL level, the Adelaide Football Club selected Murray with pick seven in the 2024 mid-season draft, joining his older brother Nick at the club. Murray spent his first two AFL seasons continuing at reserves level, playing 25 games across both years. On 5 April 2025, he fractured his fibula and injured his syndesmosis in a loss to North Adelaide, causing him to miss three and a half months of the 2025 SANFL season. He returned for the club's last seven games of the year, including two finals.

Ahead of the 2026 season, Murray formed a ruck tandem with Lachlan McAndrew, working under the league's new ruck rules. He was announced to make his senior debut in round 1 of the 2026 AFL season against Collingwood.

== Player profile ==
Murray is a "mobile" 201cm ruck / key forward. He has been noted for his versatility and ability to play a key position.

== Statistics ==
Updated to the end of round 22, 2026.

Legend
G	Goals	K	Kicks	D	Disposals	T	Tackles
B	Behinds	H	Handballs	M	Marks	H/O	Hit-outs

Season	Team	No.	Games	Totals								Averages (per game)								Votes
Season	Team	No.	Games	G	B	K	H	D	M	T	H/O	G	B	K	H	D	M	T	H/O	Votes
2024	Adelaide	39	0	—	—	—	—	—	—	—	—	—	—	—	—	—	—	—	—	0
2025	Adelaide	39	0	—	—	—	—	—	—	—	—	—	—	—	—	—	—	—	—	0
2026	Adelaide	39	12	9	5	58	21	79	33	26	104	0.8	0.4	4.8	1.8	6.6	2.8	2.2	8.7	0
Career			12	9	5	58	21	79	33	26	104	0.8	0.4	4.8	1.8	6.6	2.8	2.2	8.7	0
