= Ed Richards (footballer) =

Australian rules footballer

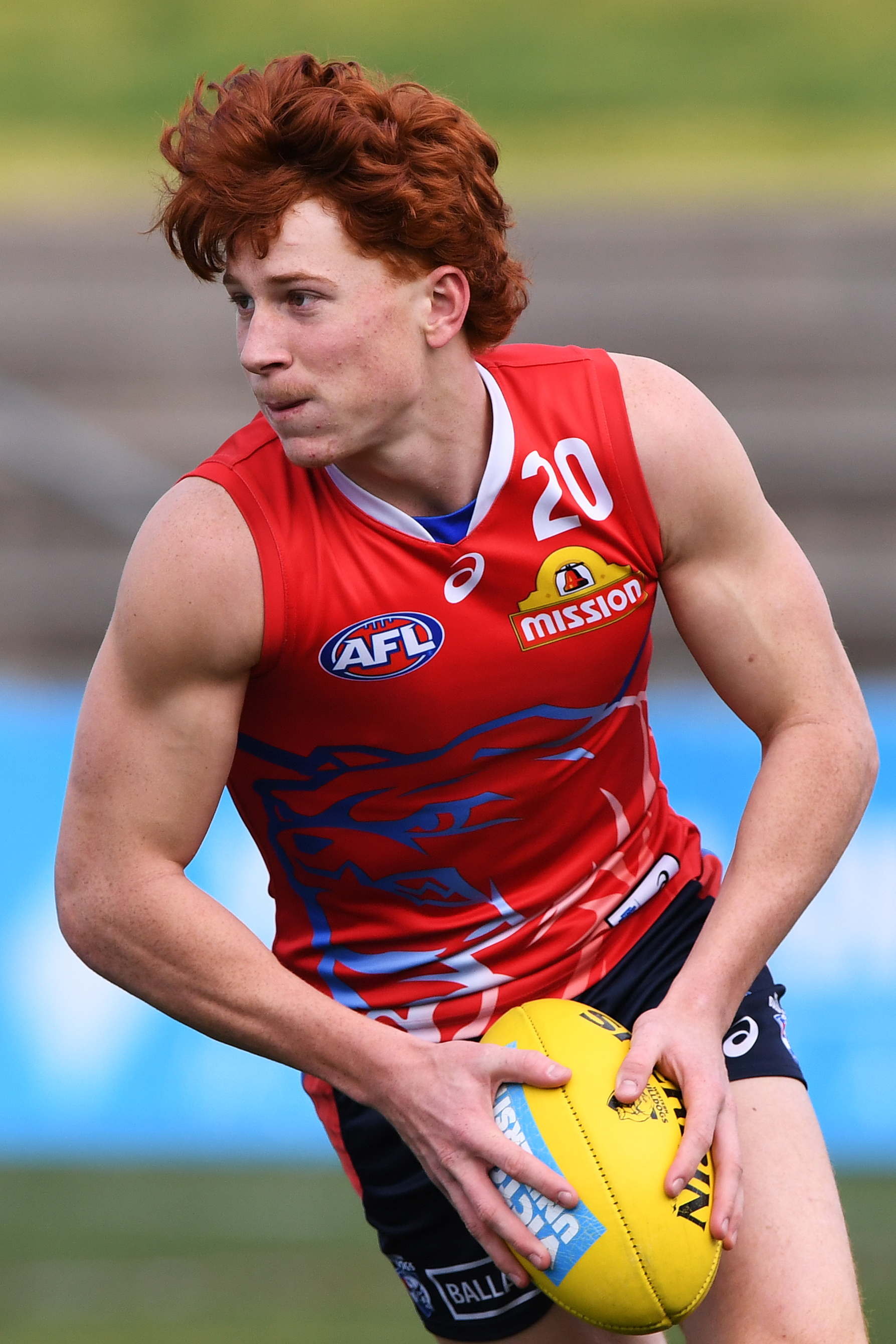
- Richards in August 2018

Personal information
- Full name: Edward Richards
- Nickname: Chilli
- Born: 3 July 1999 (age 27)
- Original team: Oakleigh Chargers (TAC Cup)
- Draft: No. 16, 2017 national draft
- Debut: Round 2, 2018, Western Bulldogs vs. West Coast, at Etihad Stadium
- Height: 188 cm (6 ft 2 in)
- Weight: 89 kg (196 lb)
- Position: Midfielder / defender

Club information
- Current club: Western Bulldogs
- Number: 20

Playing career^{1}
Years	Club	Games (Goals)
2018–	Western Bulldogs	169 (76)

Representative team honours^{2}
Years	Team	Games (Goals)
2026	Victoria	1 (0)
- ^{1} Playing statistics correct to the end of round 23, 2026.^{2} Representative statistics correct as of 2026.

Career highlights
- All-Australian team: 2025; Charles Sutton Medal: 2025; AFL Rising Star nominee (2018); Gary Dempsey Medal (2023)

Edward Richards (born 3 July 1999) is a professional Australian rules footballer who plays for the Western Bulldogs in the Australian Football League (AFL). He was selected by the Bulldogs with the sixteenth pick in the 2017 national draft after playing his under-18 football with the Oakleigh Chargers.

Richards made his debut in the second round of the 2018 season at Etihad Stadium against the West Coast Eagles. He received a Rising Star nomination in round 10 of the same season against Collingwood. He initially played as a half-back but transitioned into a midfielder.

In the 2025 season, he was awarded the Charles Sutton Medal for the Western Bulldogs best and fairest player and was also selected in the All-Australian team for the first time.

== Early life ==
Ed Richards grew up in Melbourne and played his under-18 football with the Oakleigh Chargers in the Talent League and attended Carey Grammar. Richards is descended from a family embedded in Australian rules football history, his great-great-grandfather is Charlie Pannam Sr., his grandfather is Ron Richards, and his great-uncle is Lou Richards.

== Career ==
=== 2018–2023: Early years and development ===
Richards debuted in round 2, 2018, and went on to play 21 games that season. His Round 10 performance earned him a Rising Star nomination. For many of his early seasons he played primarily off the half-back flank.

By 2022, Richards had cemented his place in the Bulldogs' first team and in 2023 he signed a contract extension tying him to the club until at least the end of 2025.

=== 2024: Transition to midfield ===
Ahead of the 2024 season, Richards began transitioning from half-back into the midfield, a move initiated by the Bulldogs' coaching staff to exploit his ball use, speed and decision-making in contested situations. During that season he averaged over 21 disposals.

=== 2025: Breakout season ===
The 2025 season proved to be Ed Richards' breakout campaign. He delivered career-best numbers including 25.8 disposals, 10.9 contested possessions, 5.7 clearances, 6.4 inside-50s, and 8.3 score involvements per game across 23 appearances. His consistency, impact and influence on games saw him awarded the club’s highest honour, the Charles Sutton Medal, by polling 299 votes, narrowly ahead of long-time teammate and skipper Marcus Bontempelli.

His form earned him selection in the All-Australian team for the first time. According to Champion Data, he ranked as the second-best player in the league in 2025, and they even floated the idea of Richards joining their "Immortal" list, an elite group that includes legendary footballers such as Gary Ablett Jr., Patrick Dangerfield and Dustin Martin.

== Honours ==
- Charles Sutton Medal: 2025
- All-Australian team: 2025
- Gary Dempsey Medal – Western Bulldogs: 2023
- Tony Liberatore Most Improved Player Award – Western Bulldogs: 2022
- AFL Rising Star nominee (2018)

== Statistics ==
Updated to the end of round 22, 2026.

Legend
G	Goals	K	Kicks	D	Disposals	T	Tackles
B	Behinds	H	Handballs	M	Marks

Season	Team	No.	Games	Totals							Averages (per game)							Votes
Season	Team	No.	Games	G	B	K	H	D	M	T	G	B	K	H	D	M	T	Votes
2018	Western Bulldogs	20	21	8	5	166	119	285	56	51	0.4	0.2	7.9	5.7	13.6	2.7	2.4	0
2019	Western Bulldogs	20	20	9	13	138	95	233	56	47	0.5	0.7	6.9	4.8	11.7	2.8	2.4	0
2020 (Note: The 2020 season was played with 17 home-and-away matches per team (down from 22) and 16-minute quarters with time on (down from 20-minute quarters with time on) due to the impact of the COVID-19 pandemic.)	Western Bulldogs	20	17	6	7	93	90	183	24	34	0.4	0.4	5.5	5.3	10.8	1.4	2.0	0
2021	Western Bulldogs	20	5	1	0	43	25	68	16	9	0.2	0.0	8.6	5.0	13.6	3.2	1.8	0
2022	Western Bulldogs	20	22	0	0	270	136	406	130	36	0.0	0.0	12.3	6.2	18.5	5.9	1.6	0
2023	Western Bulldogs	20	19	1	3	292	111	403	107	36	0.1	0.2	15.4	5.8	21.2	5.6	1.9	0
2024	Western Bulldogs	20	21	11	12	274	175	449	97	77	0.5	0.6	13.0	8.3	21.4	4.6	3.7	6
2025	Western Bulldogs	20	23	22	15	353	240	593	77	84	1.0	0.7	15.3	10.4	25.8	3.3	3.7	11
2026	Western Bulldogs	20	20	16	5	343	168	511	79	91	0.8	0.3	17.2	8.4	25.6	4.0	4.6	0
Career			168	74	60	1972	1159	3131	642	465	0.4	0.4	11.7	6.9	18.6	3.8	2.8	17
