= Ollie Florent =

Australian rules footballer

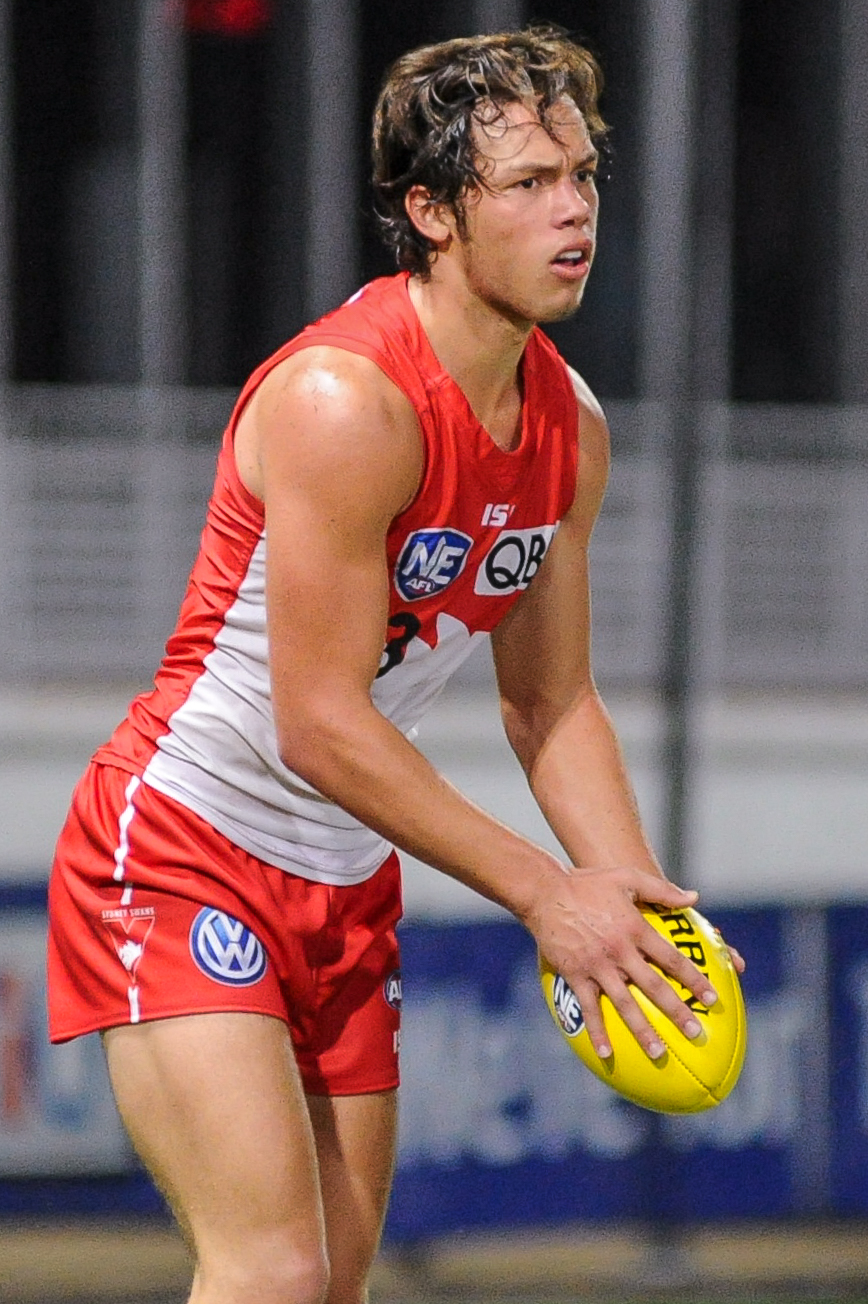
- Florent playing for Sydney in April 2017

Personal information
- Full name: Oliver Florent
- Nickname: Ollie
- Born: 22 July 1998 (age 28)
- Original team: Sandringham Dragons (TAC Cup)/Beaumaris
- Draft: No. 11, 2016 national draft
- Debut: Round 1, 2017, Sydney vs. Port Adelaide, at Sydney Cricket Ground
- Height: 183 cm (6 ft 0 in)
- Weight: 80 kg (176 lb)
- Position: Defender

Club information
- Current club: Carlton
- Number: 14

Playing career^{1}
Years	Club	Games (Goals)
2017–2025	Sydney	184 (51)
2026–	Carlton	25 (2)
Total		209 (53)
- ^{1} Playing statistics correct to the end of the 2026 season.

Career highlights
- AFL Rising Star nominee (2018)

Oliver Florent (born 22 July 1998) is a professional Australian rules footballer playing for the Carlton Football Club in the Australian Football League (AFL).

== Early football ==
Florent attended Mentone Grammar School and Cheltenham East Primary School. His paternal grandparents were born in Mauritius. He is the son of Australian tennis player Andrew Florent.

== AFL Playing career ==
=== Sydney Swans ===
He was drafted by the Sydney Swans with their first selection and eleventh overall in the 2016 national draft. He made his debut in the twenty-eight point loss against Port Adelaide in the opening round of the 2017 season at the Sydney Cricket Ground.

Florent received the Rising Star nomination for round eleven, 2018 after recording 20 disposals for the fourth consecutive match in the Swans' 30-point win over Carlton at the Sydney Cricket Ground.

During the Swans clash with Port Adelaide in round 4, 2023, Florent had the shot to win after the siren, however, his kick was touched by Port Adelaide defender Aliir Aliir before the goal line, and failed to register a score.

=== Carlton ===
Florent was traded to Carlton following the 2025 AFL season. He had a strong first season with Carlton, coming second in the John Nicholls Medal.

== Personal life ==
Florent supported Hawthorn as a junior.

== Statistics ==
Updated to the end of the 2026 season.

Legend
G	Goals	K	Kicks	D	Disposals	T	Tackles
B	Behinds	H	Handballs	M	Marks

Season	Team	No.	Games	Totals							Averages (per game)							Votes
Season	Team	No.	Games	G	B	K	H	D	M	T	G	B	K	H	D	M	T	Votes
2017	Sydney	13	9	4	1	50	38	88	15	19	0.4	0.1	5.6	4.2	9.8	1.7	2.1	0
2018	Sydney	13	23	9	7	216	168	384	66	56	0.4	0.3	9.4	7.3	16.7	2.9	2.4	3
2019	Sydney	13	21	6	6	248	156	404	78	43	0.3	0.3	11.8	7.4	19.2	3.7	2.0	5
2020 (Note: The 2020 season was played with 17 home-and-away matches per team (down from 22) and 16-minute quarters with time on (down from 20-minute quarters with time on) due to the impact of the COVID-19 pandemic.)	Sydney	13	17	4	4	180	98	278	40	42	0.2	0.2	10.6	5.8	16.4	2.4	2.5	2
2021	Sydney	13	23	9	6	273	163	436	93	50	0.4	0.3	11.9	7.1	19.0	4.0	2.2	3
2022	Sydney	13	25	5	6	268	145	413	124	54	0.2	0.2	10.7	5.8	16.5	5.0	2.2	0
2023	Sydney	13	24	5	1	272	205	477	95	45	0.2	0.0	11.3	8.5	19.9	4.0	1.9	0
2024	Sydney	13	26	7	8	334	190	524	129	52	0.3	0.3	12.8	7.3	20.2	5.0	2.0	0
2025	Sydney	13	16	2	7	139	104	243	66	34	0.1	0.4	8.7	6.5	15.2	4.1	2.1	0
2026	Carlton	14	25	2	3	379	185	564	129	54	0.1	0.1	15.2	7.4	22.6	5.2	2.2	2
Career			209	53	49	2359	1452	3811	835	449	0.3	0.2	11.3	6.9	18.2	4.0	2.1	15

== Honours and achievements ==
Team

- Minor Premiership: (Sydney Swans) 2024

Individual

- AFL Rising Star nominee: 2018 (round 11)
