= Harry Morrison =

Australian rules footballer

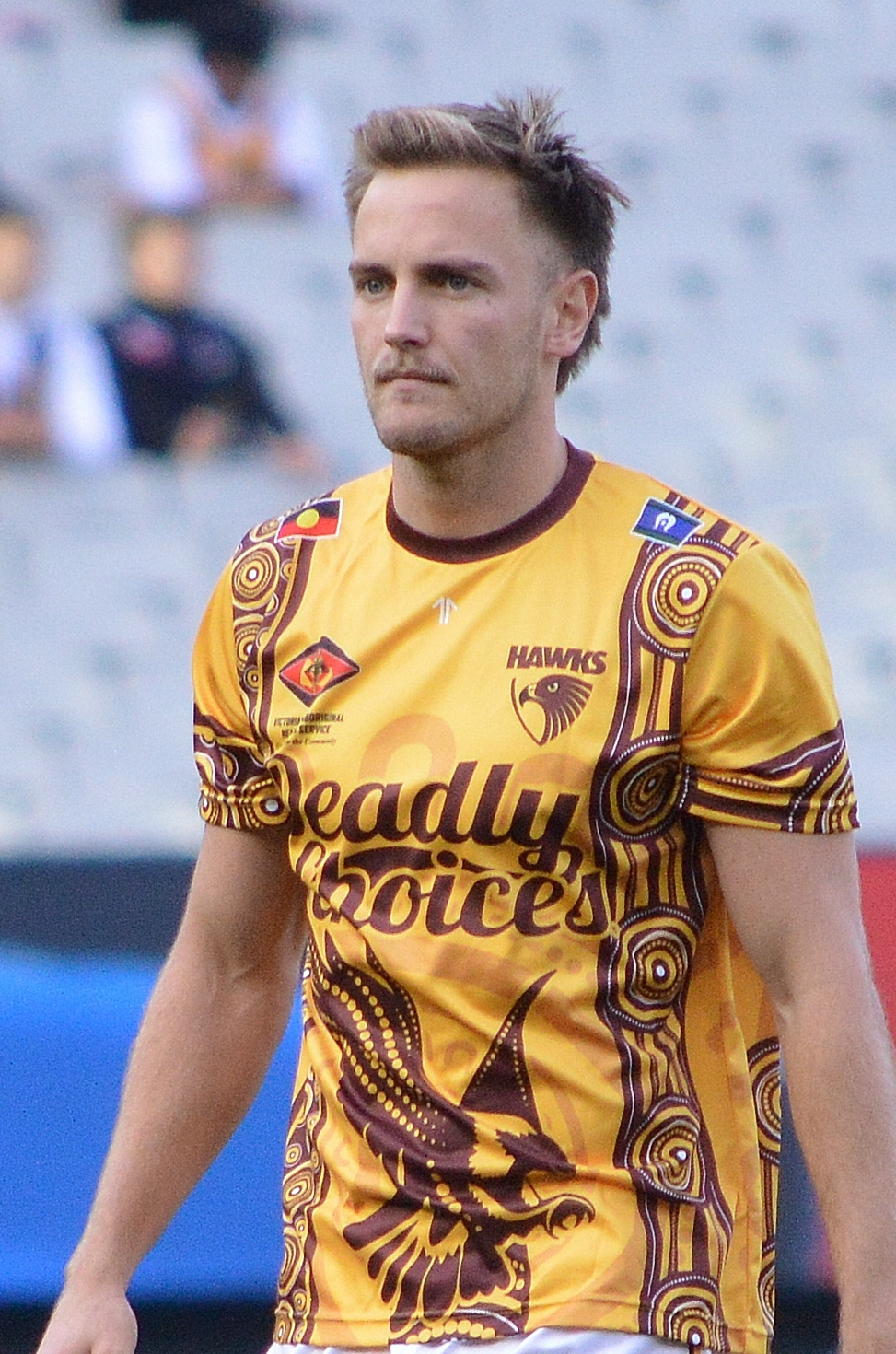
- Morrison in May 2026

Personal information
- Full name: Harry Morrison
- Born: 12 November 1998 (age 27); Benalla, Victoria
- Original team: Murray Bushrangers (TAC Cup)
- Draft: No. 74, 2016 national draft
- Debut: Round 23, 2017, Hawthorn vs. Western Bulldogs, at Etihad Stadium
- Height: 184 cm (6 ft 0 in)
- Weight: 79 kg (174 lb)
- Position: Midfielder

Club information
- Current club: Hawthorn
- Number: 1

Playing career^{1}
Years	Club	Games (Goals)
2017–	Hawthorn	138 (35)
- ^{1} Playing statistics correct to the end of 2026.

Harry Morrison (born 12 November 1998) is a professional Australian rules footballer playing for the Hawthorn Football Club in the Australian Football League (AFL).

== Early career ==
Playing for the Murray Bushrangers in the TAC Cup, Morrison suffered an anterior cruciate ligament (ACL) injury during the 2014 season as a bottom-aged player. He returned to the Murray Bushrangers for the 2015 season for the second half of the year after starring for the Benalla Saints after his return to football. Morrison then went on to play a crucial role in the Benalla Saints U18 team winning back to back premierships. Morrison then played for the Murray Bushrangers in the 2016 season and was named among the best players in the grand final loss against the Sandringham Dragons.

== AFL career ==
Morrison was drafted by the Hawthorn Football Club with their first selection and seventy-fourth overall in the 2016 national draft. He made his debut against Western Bulldogs in the last round of the 2017 AFL season.

Morrison was named the Round 20 Rising Star nominee for 2018 after an impressive performance against Essendon.

== Statistics ==
Updated to the end of 2026.

Legend
G	Goals	K	Kicks	D	Disposals	T	Tackles
B	Behinds	H	Handballs	M	Marks

Season	Team	No.	Games	Totals							Averages (per game)							Votes
Season	Team	No.	Games	G	B	K	H	D	M	T	G	B	K	H	D	M	T	Votes
2017	Hawthorn	35	1	0	1	10	11	21	6	1	0.0	1.0	10.0	11.0	21.0	6.0	1.0	0
2018	Hawthorn	35	21	5	8	184	121	305	100	65	0.2	0.4	8.8	5.8	14.5	4.8	3.1	0
2019	Hawthorn	1	9	0	1	64	52	116	27	29	0.0	0.1	7.1	5.8	12.9	3.0	3.2	0
2020 (Note: The 2020 season was played with 17 home-and-away matches per team (down from 22) and 16-minute quarters with time on (down from 20-minute quarters with time on) due to the impact of the COVID-19 pandemic.)	Hawthorn	1	11	0	1	92	64	156	38	19	0.0	0.1	8.4	5.8	14.2	3.5	1.7	0
2021	Hawthorn	1	15	7	2	124	107	231	67	34	0.5	0.1	8.3	7.1	15.4	4.5	2.3	0
2022	Hawthorn	1	21	9	2	280	123	403	122	58	0.4	0.1	13.3	5.9	19.2	5.8	2.8	0
2023	Hawthorn	1	13	2	2	163	78	241	69	36	0.2	0.2	12.5	6.0	18.5	5.3	2.8	0
2024	Hawthorn	1	12	2	1	122	61	183	51	23	0.2	0.1	10.2	5.1	15.3	4.3	1.9	0
2025	Hawthorn	1	20	5	2	189	159	348	91	61	0.3	0.1	9.5	8.0	17.4	4.6	3.1	0
2026	Hawthorn	1	15	5	1	151	113	264	75	41	0.3	0.1	10.1	7.5	17.6	5.0	2.7	0
Career			138	35	21	1379	889	2268	646	367	0.3	0.2	10.0	6.4	16.4	4.7	2.7	0

== Honours and achievements ==
Team

- McClelland Trophy (Hawthorn): 2024

Individual

- AFL Rising Star nominee: 2018

== Personal life ==
Morrison is the cousin of former player Tom Rockliff. He is the godson of late Hawthorn player and coach Ken Judge.
