= Riley Bonner =

Australian rules footballer (born 1997)

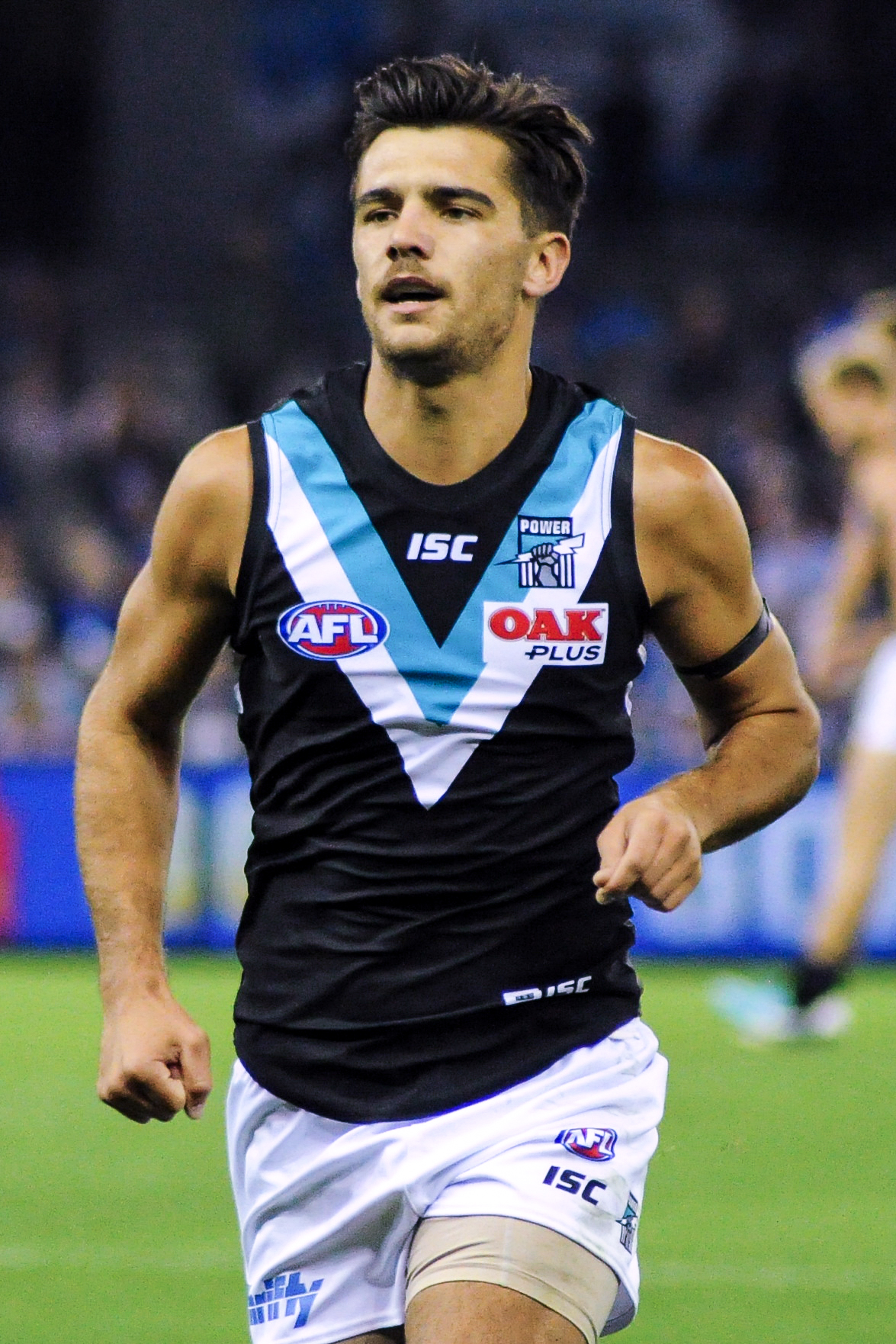
- Bonner playing for Port Adelaide in June 2018

Personal information
- Born: 7 March 1997 (age 29)
- Original teams: West Adelaide (SANFL); Goodwood Saints
- Draft: No. 37, 2015 national draft (Port Adelaide); No. 3, 2023 pre-season draft (St Kilda)
- Debut: Round 23, 2016, Port Adelaide vs. Gold Coast, at Metricon Stadium
- Height: 190 cm (6 ft 3 in)
- Weight: 85 kg (187 lb)
- Position: Defender/Midfielder

Playing career
Years	Club	Games (Goals)
2014-2015	West Adelaide	1 (0)
2016–2023	Port Adelaide	93 (13)
2016-2023	Port Adelaide (SANFL)	49 (11)
2024	St Kilda	19 (1)
2024	Sandringham	2 (0)
2025-	Casey Demons	21 (4)

Career highlights
- AFL Rising Star nominee: 2018; Casey Demons Best and Fairest: 2025; VFL Team of the Year: 2025

Riley Bonner (born 7 March 1997) is an Australian rules footballer who plays for the Casey Demons in the Victorian Football League (VFL). He previously played professionally for Port Adelaide and St Kilda in the Australian Football League (AFL).

== AFL career ==
Bonner was drafted by Port Adelaide with their first selection, thirty-seventh overall, in the 2015 national draft showcasing his skills for the West Adelaide Football Club in the South Australian National Football League (SANFL). Bonner made his debut in the twenty-three point win against Gold Coast in round 23, 2016, at Metricon Stadium.

In 2018, Bonner received a nomination for the 2018 AFL Rising Star award after recording 31 disposals in the win against Fremantle in round 1. Following the conclusion of the 2023 season, during which he played 93 games for Port Adelaide, he was delisted by the club. Subsequently, he was drafted by St Kilda in the 2023 pre-season draft.

At the conclusion of the 2024 AFL season, Bonner was among 4 players delisted by the club.

== Post-AFL career ==
Bonner signed with the Casey Demons in the Victorian Football League following his delisting. In 2025, he played in 20 games and won the clubs Best and Fairest award. He also finished runner-up in voting for the J. J. Liston Trophy, with 23 votes.

== Statistics ==
Legend
G	Goals	K	Kicks	D	Disposals	T	Tackles
B	Behinds	H	Handballs	M	Marks

Season	Team	No.	Games	Totals							Averages (per game)							Votes
Season	Team	No.	Games	G	B	K	H	D	M	T	G	B	K	H	D	M	T	Votes
2016	Port Adelaide	26	1	0	0	17	5	22	4	2	0.0	0.0	17.0	5.0	22.0	4.0	2.0	0
2017	Port Adelaide	26	3	0	0	32	22	54	15	7	0.0	0.0	10.7	7.3	18.0	5.0	2.3	0
2018	Port Adelaide	26	19	3	1	219	108	327	84	24	0.2	0.1	11.5	5.7	17.2	4.4	1.3	0
2019	Port Adelaide	26	19	5	5	247	93	340	82	27	0.3	0.3	13.0	4.9	17.9	4.3	1.4	2
2020 (Note: The 2020 season was played with 17 home-and-away matches per team (down from 22) and 16-minute quarters with time on (down from 20-minute quarters with time on) due to the impact of the COVID-19 pandemic.)	Port Adelaide	26	9	0	0	97	25	122	33	7	0.0	0.0	10.8	2.8	13.6	3.7	0.8	0
2021	Port Adelaide	26	14	2	1	206	73	279	67	16	0.1	0.1	14.7	5.2	19.9	4.8	1.1	0
2022	Port Adelaide	26	17	1	2	233	87	320	86	13	0.1	0.1	13.7	5.1	18.8	5.1	0.8	0
2023	Port Adelaide	26	11	2	7	100	42	142	37	16	0.2	0.6	9.1	3.8	12.9	3.4	1.5	0
2024	St Kilda	36	19	1	6	308	93	401	105	25	0.1	0.3	16.2	4.9	21.1	5.5	1.3	0
Career			112	14	22	1459	548	2007	513	137	0.1	0.2	13.0	4.9	17.9	4.6	1.2	2
