= Cranbourne Football Club =

Australian rules football team

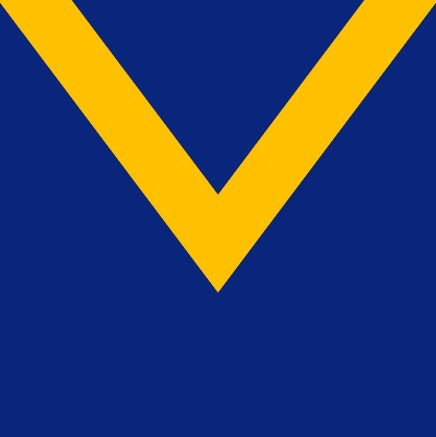

Names
- Full name: Cranbourne Football Club
- Nickname: The Eagles

Club details
- Founded: 10 May 1889
- Colours: Blue, Gold
- Competition: Southern FNL
- President: Chris Keenan
- Coach: Angelo Soldatos
- Captain: Zak Roscoe
- Ground: Livingston Reserve

The Cranbourne Football Club, nicknamed the Eagles, is an Australian rules football club based in the Melbourne suburb of Cranbourne. They currently compete in the Southern Football Netball League (SFNL).

== History ==
The history of Cranbourne dates back to as far back as the 1890s after its 1889 foundation and was a founding club of the newly formed Berwick District Football Association in 1910. Despite the ongoing wars in the 1910s and from 1939 to 1945, the club remained in the competition, which changed its name to the Dandenong District Football Association, until 1953 when it relocated to the South West Gippsland Football League as an inaugural member. Cranbourne struggled in its first few years of competition in the SWGFL but managed to claim its first senior flag in the new competition in 1966 but the 1980s was to be the Eagles' best era, winning seven flags from 1985 to 1993. The SWGFL was absorbed by the Mornington Peninsula Nepean Football League in 1995, just eight years after the merger of the two leagues. Cranbourne saw success early in the MPNFL's Northern division by beating Karingal by 8 points in the Grand Final. They began competing in the Casey Cardinia division of the league and contested in four consecutive grand finals from 2011 to 2014, but 2011 was the only year the Eagles came out victorious. 2015 saw the nine clubs competing in the Casey Cardinia division leave the MPNFL to start the South East Football Netball League. Cranbourne made the inaugural SEFNL grand final only to lose to Berwick but came back to beat the Wickers in 2016 15.9.99 to 9.11.65. Following their 2016 South East Football Netball League (SEFNL) premiership victory over Berwick, the Cranbourne Football Club experienced several significant developments. In 2019, the SEFNL merged with the Yarra Valley Mountain District Football League to form the Outer East Football Netball League. Cranbourne participated in this league until 2021. In 2022, the club transitioned to the Southern Football Netball League (SFNL) and secured the Division 1 Senior premiership that same year. In the 2022 Southern Football Netball League (SFNL) Division 1 Grand Final, Cranbourne defeated Cheltenham by six points, with a final score of 7.8 (50) to 6.8 (44). The following year, in the 2023 Grand Final, Cheltenham turned the tables, narrowly overcoming Cranbourne by three points, finishing 7.17 (59) to 8.8 (56) As of 2025, under the guidance of coach Angelo Soldatos, the team is captained by Reigning League Medalist Zak Roscoe, and is embarking on a new era!

== Premierships ==
- Berwick District Football Association: 1926
- South West Gippsland Football League: 1966, 1985, 1986, 1987, 1989, 1990, 1991, 1993
- Mornington Peninsula Nepean Football League: (date?)
- (Northern division): 1995
- (Casey Cardinia division): 2011
- Victorian Women's Football League: 2015
- South East Football Netball League: 2016
- Southern Football Netball League: 2022
