= 2018 AFL Rising Star =

2018 NAB AFL Rising Star
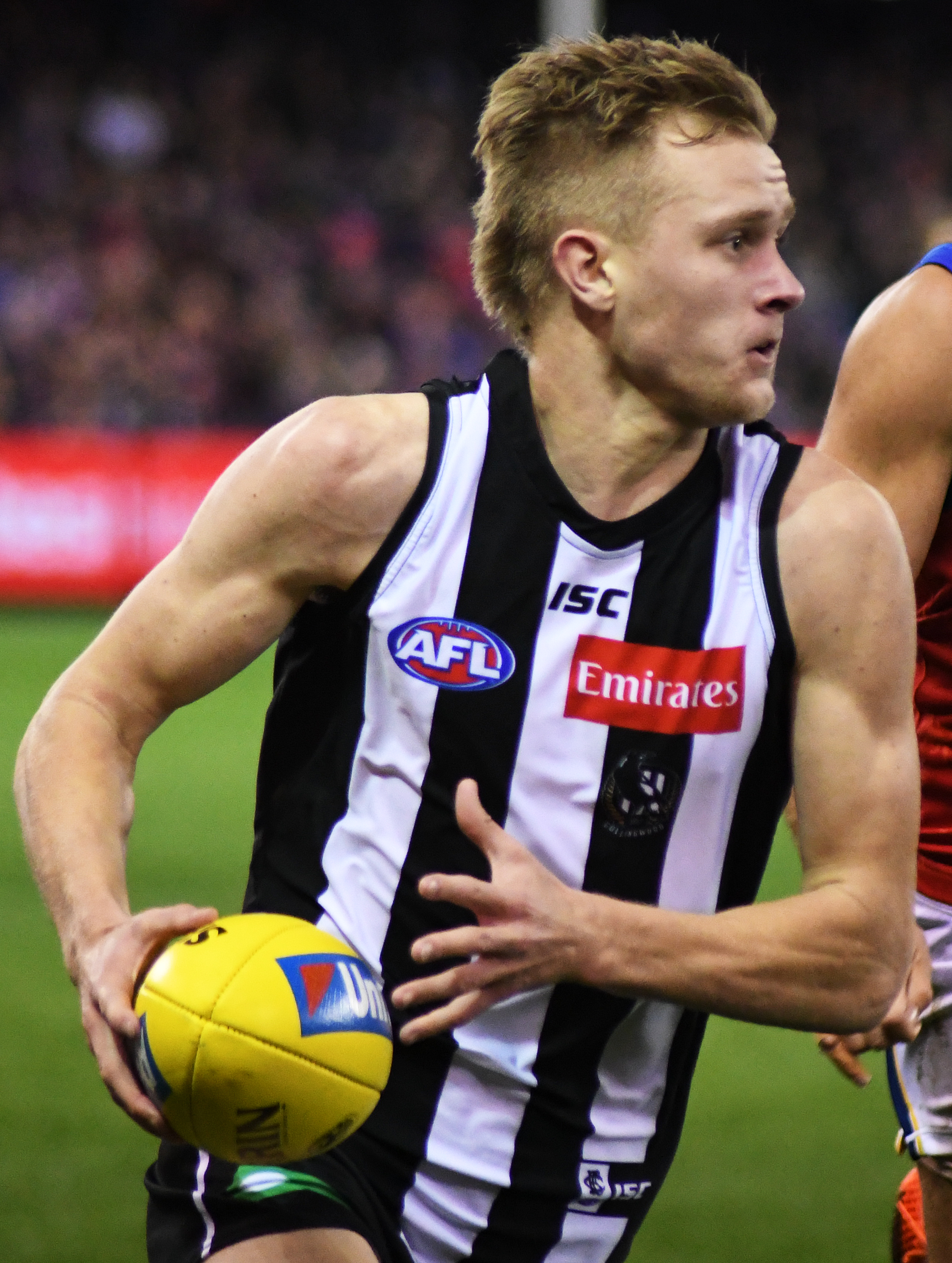
- Jaidyn Stephenson, winner
- Sponsored by: National Australia Bank
- Date: 31 August 2018
- Location: Crown Palladium
- Country: Australia
- Ron Evans medallist: Jaidyn Stephenson (Collingwood)

The NAB AFL Rising Star award is given annually to a standout young player in the Australian Football League (AFL). Jaidyn Stephenson of Collingwood was the winner with 52 votes ahead of Tom Doedee of Adelaide who received 42.

== Eligibility ==
Every round, a nomination is given to a standout young player who performed well during that particular round. To be eligible for nomination, a player must be under 21 on 1 January of that year and have played ten or fewer senior games before the start of the season; a player who is suspended may be nominated, but is not eligible to win the award.

== Nominations ==
2018 AFL Rising Star nominees
| Round | Player | Club | Ref. |
|---|---|---|---|
| 1 | Riley Bonner | Port Adelaide | |
| 2 | Tom Doedee | Adelaide | |
| 3 | Sam Murray | Collingwood | |
| 4 | Jaidyn Stephenson | Collingwood | |
| 5 | Ben Long | St Kilda | |
| 6 | Jake Waterman | West Coast | |
| 7 | Jack Henry | Geelong | |
| 8 | Ben Ronke | Sydney | |
| 9 | Alex Witherden | Brisbane Lions | |
| 10 | Ed Richards | Western Bulldogs | |
| 11 | Oliver Florent | Sydney | |
| 12 | Brennan Cox | Fremantle | |
| 13 | Hunter Clark | St Kilda | |
| 14 | Paddy Dow | Carlton | |
| 15 | Cameron Rayner | Brisbane Lions | |
| 16 | Adam Cerra | Fremantle | |
| 17 | Sam Taylor | Greater Western Sydney | |
| 18 | Jack Higgins | Richmond | |
| 19 | Tom Cole | West Coast | |
| 20 | Harry Morrison | Hawthorn | |
| 21 | James Worpel | Hawthorn | |
| 22 | Aaron Francis | Essendon | |
| 23 | Aaron Naughton | Western Bulldogs | |

== Final voting ==
| | Player | Club | Votes |
|---|---|---|---|
| 1 | Jaidyn Stephenson | Collingwood | 52 |
| 2 | Tom Doedee | Adelaide | 42 |
| 3 | Alex Witherden | Brisbane Lions | 35 |
| 4 | Jack Higgins | Richmond | 11 |
| 5 | Oliver Florent | Sydney | 10 |
| 5 | Jack Henry | Geelong | 10 |
| 7 | Cameron Rayner | Brisbane Lions | 4 |
| 8 | Ben Ronke | Sydney | 2 |
| 9 | Aaron Francis | Essendon | 1 |
| 9 | Ed Richards | Western Bulldogs | 1 |
