= Sam Murray (footballer) =

Australian rules footballer

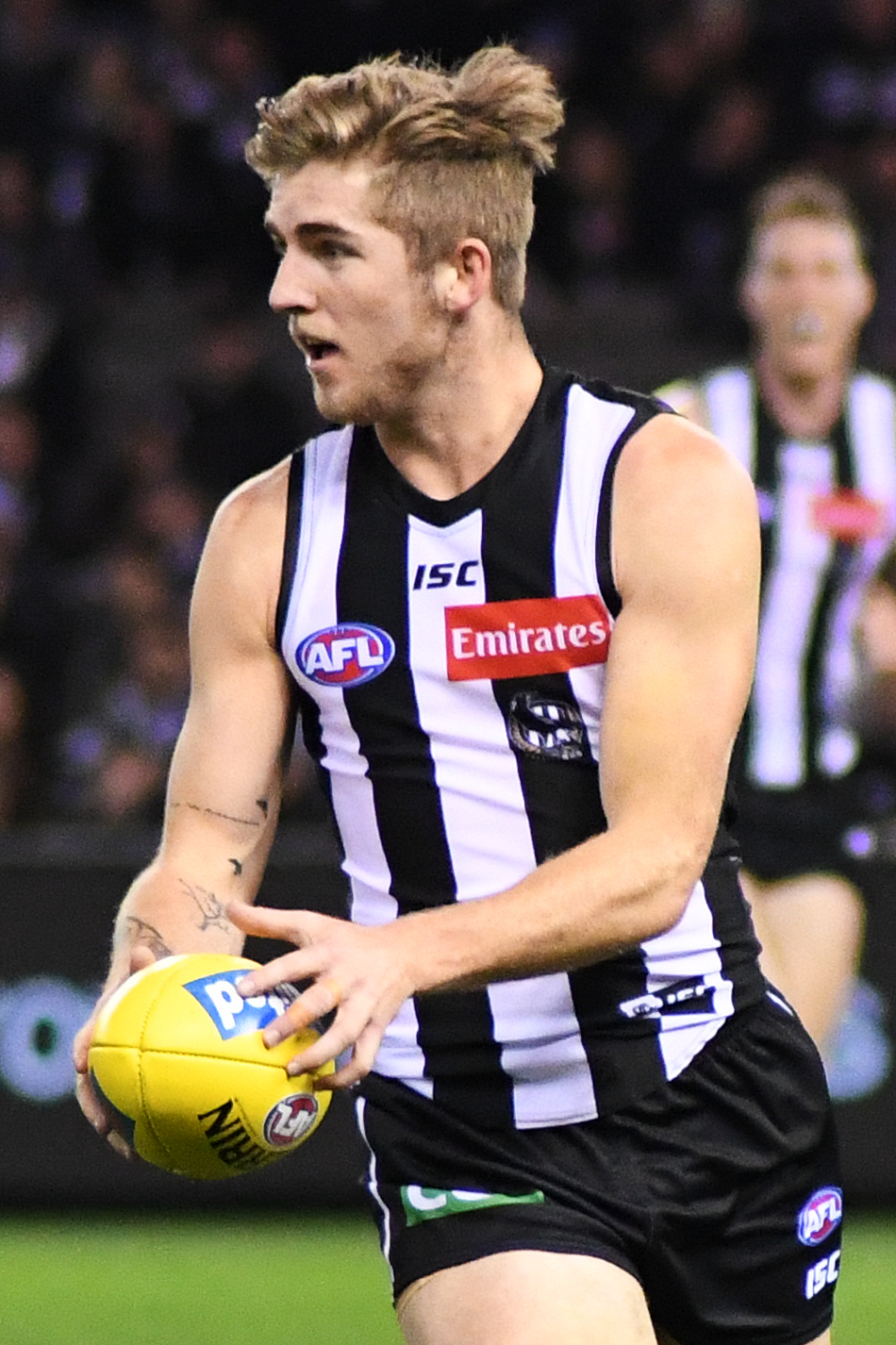
- Murray playing for Collingwood in August 2018

Personal information
- Born: 2 September 1997 (age 29)
- Original teams: Henty, Wodonga Raiders (O&MFL)
- Draft: No. 66, 2015 rookie draft
- Debut: Round 1, 2018, Collingwood vs. Hawthorn, at MCG
- Height: 187 cm (6 ft 2 in)
- Weight: 86 kg (190 lb)
- Position: Defender

Playing career^{1}
Years	Club	Games (Goals)
2013–2014	Henty (Hume FNL)	31 (22)
2015	Wodonga Raiders	15 (19)
2016–2017	Sydney (Reseves)	36 (24)
2018	Collingwood (Reseves)	5 (1)
2018–2019	Collingwood (Seniors)	13 (0)
2020	Ganmain Grong Grong Matong	6 (3)
2021–2026	Wangaratta Rovers	101 (42)
Total		207 (111)

Coaching career
Years	Club	Games (W–L–D)
2023–2026	Wang Rovers	(60–21–0)
- ^{1} Playing statistics correct to the end of the 2026 season.

Career highlights
- Henty (Hume FNL) Premiership: 2014; AFL Rising Star nominee: 2018; O&MFNL Premiership coach: 2024, 2025, 2026; Wangaratta Rovers best & fairest: 2022, 2023, 2024, 2025.

Sam Murray (born 2 September 1997) is a former professional Australian rules footballer who played for the Collingwood Football Club in the Australian Football League (AFL). He was drafted by the Sydney Swans with their final selection and sixty-sixth overall in the 2015 rookie draft.

Murray initially played with Henty FNC in the Hume Football League, which included their 2014 premiership. Murray then played with the Wodonga Raiders in the Ovens & Murray Football League in 2015 after he missed out on selection for the 2015 Murray Bushrangers under 18 squad.

Murray played with the Sydney Swans in the North East Australian Football League (NEAFL) in 2016 and 2017, including their 2016 and 2017 grand final losses.

After spending two seasons with Sydney without playing a senior AFL match, he was traded to Collingwood during the 2017 trade period. He made his debut in the thirty-four point loss to Hawthorn at the Melbourne Cricket Ground in the opening round of the 2018 season. In round 3, he was nominated for the 2018 AFL Rising Star award.

Murray in August 2018 returned a positive test for a matchday positive for an illicit drug, believed to be cocaine.

At the conclusion of the 2018 season, Collingwood delisted Murray, stating they will re-draft him as a rookie if he is available. A month later, Collingwood re-drafted Murray as a rookie with pick 33. On 26 August 2019, it was announced that Murray would be available to play from the 2020 AFL season, following an 18-month backdated suspension.

On Tuesday the 18th of September, it was announced Murray would not be offered a new contract with Collingwood.

Murray was on Williamstown's VFL list in 2021 and he has played with the Wangaratta Rovers Football Club in the Ovens & Murray Football League since 2021 and has been their captain-coach from 2023 to 2026, which included their 2024 (37 possessions), 2025 and 2026 premierships and has featured in the best players in all three grand final matches.

Murray is the older brother of Adelaide Crows players, Nick Murray and Toby Murray.

== Statistics ==
Statistics are correct to the end of the 2019 season

Legend
G	Goals	K	Kicks	D	Disposals	T	Tackles
B	Behinds	H	Handballs	M	Marks

Season	Team	No.	Games	Totals							Averages (per game)						
Season	Team	No.	Games	G	B	K	H	D	M	T	G	B	K	H	D	M	T
2016	Sydney	46	0	—	—	—	—	—	—	—	—	—	—	—	—	—	—
2017	Sydney	46	0	—	—	—	—	—	—	—	—	—	—	—	—	—	—
2018	Collingwood	9	13	0	1	158	113	271	67	21	0	0.1	12.2	8.7	20.9	5.2	1.6
2019	Collingwood	9	0	—	—	—	—	—	—	—	—	—	—	—	—	—	—
Career			13	0	1	158	113	271	67	21	0	0.1	12.2	8.7	20.9	5.2	1.6
