= Jaidyn Stephenson =

Australian rules footballer (born 1999)

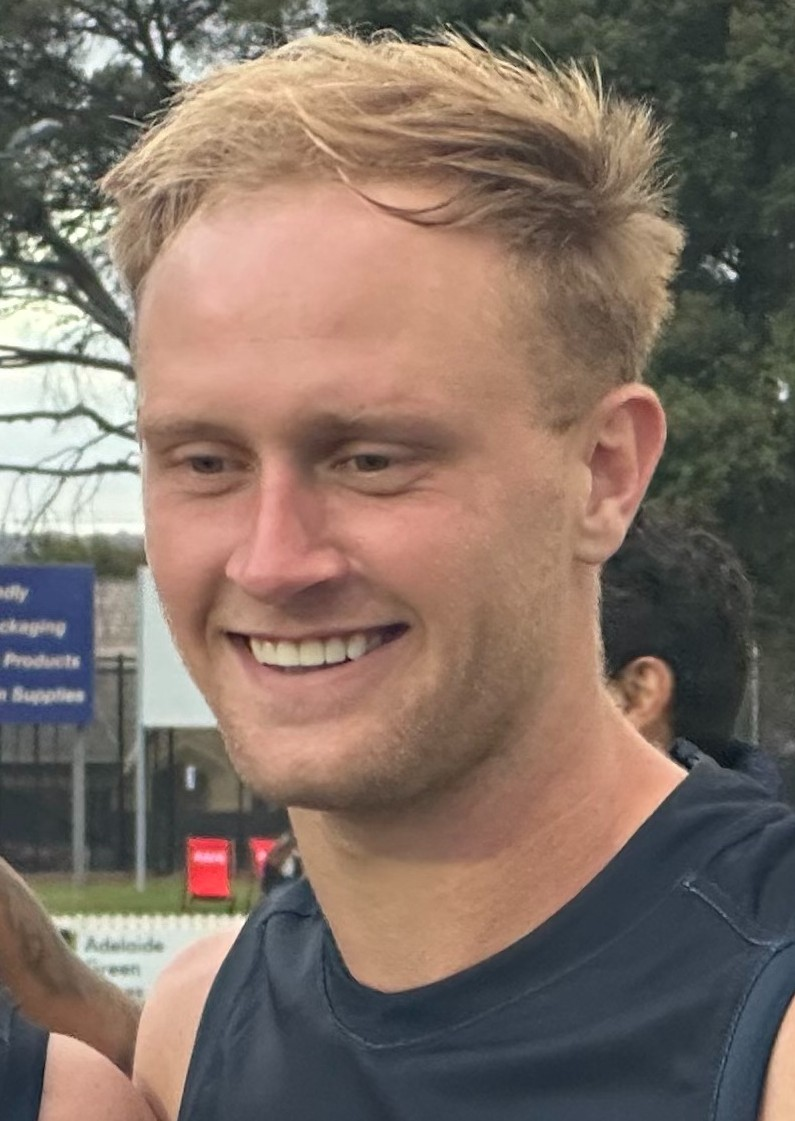
- Stephenson in 2026

Personal information
- Born: 15 January 1999 (age 27)
- Original teams: Eastern Ranges (TAC Cup); Ferntree Gully Eagles (Vic)
- Draft: No. 6, 2017 national draft
- Debut: Round 1, 2018, Collingwood vs. Hawthorn, at MCG
- Height: 189 cm (6 ft 2 in)
- Weight: 78 kg (172 lb)
- Position: Forward / midfielder

Playing career
Years	Club	Games (Goals)
2018–2020	Collingwood	54 (76)
2021–2024	North Melbourne	68 (54)
Total		122 (130)

Career highlights
- AFL Rising Star: 2018; 2x 22under22 team: (2018, 2021)

Jaidyn Stephenson (born 15 January 1999) is an Australian rules footballer who plays for the Coburg Football Club in the Victorian Football League (VFL). He previously played professionally for Collingwood and North Melbourne in the Australian Football League (AFL).

== AFL career ==
He was drafted by Collingwood with their first selection and sixth overall in the 2017 national draft. He made his debut in the 34-point loss to Hawthorn at the Melbourne Cricket Ground in round 1 of the 2018 season. His performance in the 48-point win against Adelaide in round four of the 2018 season—in which he recorded thirteen disposals, five goals, four marks and three tackles—earned him the round nomination for the AFL Rising Star. Stephenson went on to win the 2018 AFL Rising Star after a successful first season in which he kicked 38 goals, making him the first Collingwood player to win the award. Stephenson played in the 2018 AFL Grand Final kicking two goals in the first quarter, however Collingwood Football Club would ultimately lose by five points to the West Coast Eagles.

At the end of the 2020 AFL season, he was put up for trade by Collingwood to alleviate their salary cap, and was traded to North Melbourne on the final day of trade period.

Stephenson who was moved to the midfield in his first season with North Melbourne in the 2021 AFL season was named to the 22under22 for the second and final time.

After the 2024 AFL season, Stephenson retired at just 25 years of age, stating that he'd lost the passion to play.

In 2026, Stephenson attempted an AFL return, however, after training with Port Adelaide in the pre-season, he was overlooked for a senior spot.

== Controversies ==
In 2019, Stephenson was suspended for the final 10 games of the home and away season, following revelations that he placed bets on Collingwood games. There was also a $20,000 fine imposed. Overall he has had a lot of controversy throughout his career which was a reason of his wasted potential. In July 2021, Stephenson had a career high 38 disposals in a Round 17 win against the West Coast Eagles. Days later, he faced strong criticism for sharing his views that COVID-19 had been overblown by the media, and questioning vaccinations.

In August 2021, Stephenson again came under fire by the media after being hospitalised from an accident on a mountain bike while drunk, which resulted in him fracturing his hip.

== Personal life ==
As of May 2021, Stephenson was studying for a Bachelor of Commerce at Deakin University.

Stephenson attended St Joseph's College in Ferntree Gully.

Stephenson grew up in the Melbourne suburb of Ferntree Gully and played junior football for Ferntree Gully Eagles in the Eastern Football League.

== Statistics ==
Legend
G	Goals	K	Kicks	D	Disposals	T	Tackles
B	Behinds	H	Handballs	M	Marks

Season	Team	No.	Games	Totals							Averages (per game)							Votes
Season	Team	No.	Games	G	B	K	H	D	M	T	G	B	K	H	D	M	T	Votes
2018	Collingwood	35	26	38	24	205	115	320	101	75	1.5	0.9	7.9	4.4	12.3	3.9	2.9	2
2019	Collingwood	1	14	24	13	158	61	219	93	29	1.7	0.9	11.3	4.4	15.6	6.6	2.1	1
2020 (Note: The 2020 season was played with 17 home-and-away matches per team (down from 22) and 16-minute quarters with time on (down from 20-minute quarters with time on) due to the impact of the COVID-19 pandemic.)	Collingwood	1	14	14	10	85	47	132	47	25	1.0	0.7	6.1	3.4	9.4	3.4	1.8	0
2021	North Melbourne	2	19	17	19	249	119	368	109	48	0.9	1.0	13.1	6.3	19.4	5.7	2.5	3
2022	North Melbourne	2	16	3	5	192	97	289	67	42	0.2	0.3	12.0	6.1	18.1	4.2	2.6	0
2023	North Melbourne	2	21	26	10	146	80	226	75	41	1.2	0.5	7.0	3.8	10.8	3.6	2.0	0
2024	North Melbourne	2	12	8	0	106	46	152	51	20	0.7	0.0	8.8	3.8	12.7	4.3	1.7	0
2025	North Melbourne	2	0	—	—	—	—	—	—	—	—	—	—	—	—	—	—	0
Career			122	130	81	1141	565	1706	543	280	1.1	0.7	9.4	4.6	14.0	4.5	2.3	6
