= 2025 Adelaide Football Club season =

Adelaide Crows AFL season

Adelaide Football Club
2025 AFL season
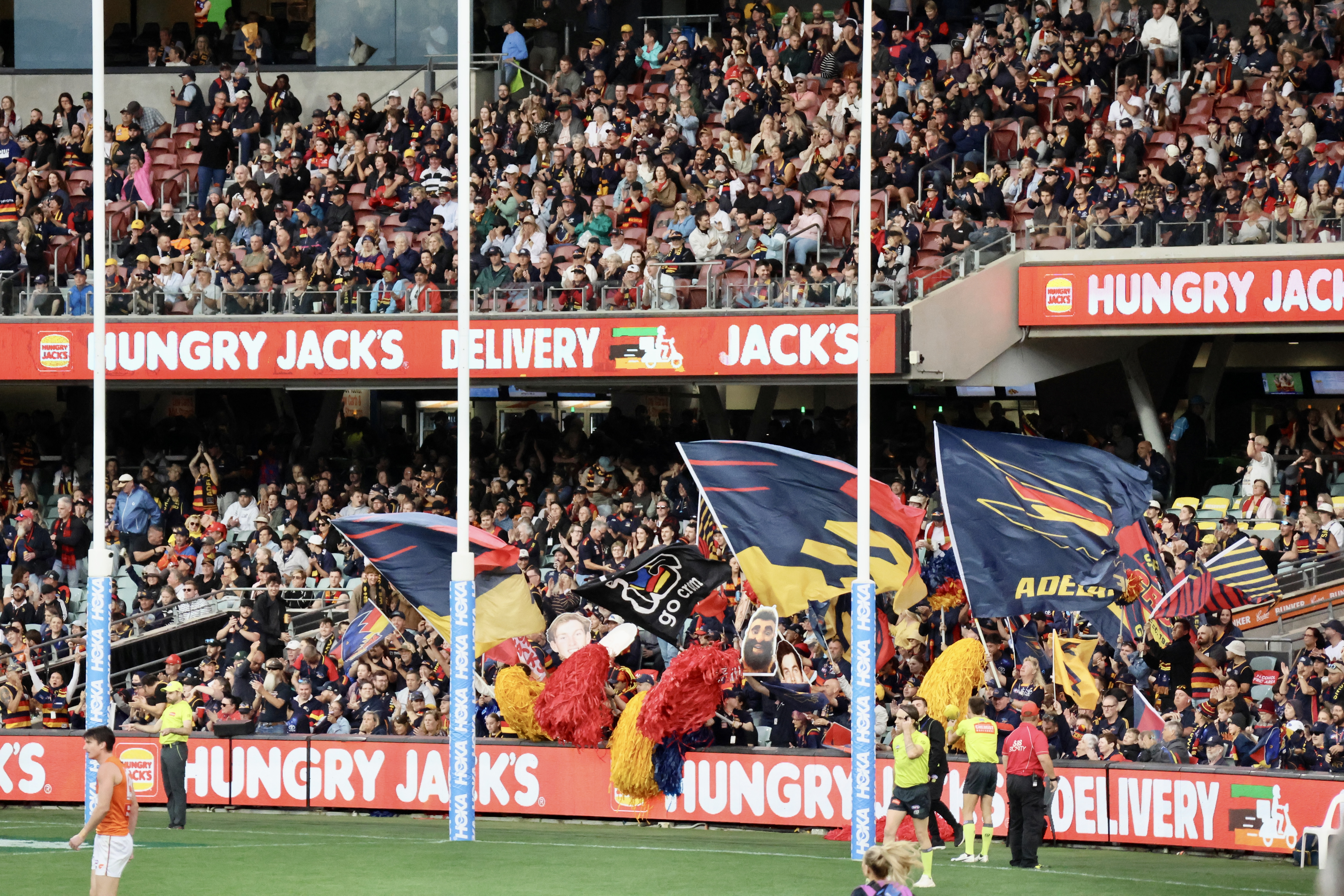
- Adelaide's supporter base during the round 6 match against Greater Western Sydney
- Coach: Matthew Nicks
- Captain: Jordan Dawson
- Home ground: Adelaide Oval
- Home & Away: 1st
- Finals: Semi-finals
- Leading goalkicker: Riley Thilthorpe (60)
- Highest home attendance: 54,283
- Lowest home attendance: 39,271
- Average home attendance: 45,533

The 2025 Adelaide Football Club season was the Adelaide Crows' 35th season of senior competition in the Australian Football League (AFL). Adelaide's women's team is playing their tenth season in the AFLW, and their reserves team played their eleventh season in the South Australian National Football League (SANFL).

In November 2024, Adelaide unveiled their new logo for the 2025 season. It features a swooping crow, reminiscent of the badge used by the club until 2010. Senior men's and women's teams adopted this logo. For the first time, the club's SANFL team will use the same logo as the senior sides. Slightly altered tri-colours also feature.

With their round 13 victory over Brisbane Lions, Adelaide improved on their 8-1-14 record from 2024. The Crows would go on to claim their first finals appearance and first minor premiership since 2017, officially securing first place following the round 24 win over North Melbourne. However, Adelaide would go on to lose both of their finals, becoming the first minor premiers in 42 years to exit the finals series in straight sets.

== Overview ==
Adelaide's 2025 board
CEO	Chairman	Deputy chair	Board							
Tim Silvers	John Olsen	Linda Fellows	Neil Balme	Shanti Berggren	Richard Fennell	James Gallagher	Graeme Goodings	Mark Ricciuto	Stephen Roche	Imelda Lynch

Adelaide's 2025 season overview
League	Captain	Coach	Home ground	W-D-L	Ladder	Finals	Best and fairest	Leading goalkicker
AFL	Jordan Dawson	Matthew Nicks	Adelaide Oval	18–0–5	1st	Semi Finals	Jordan Dawson	Riley Thilthorpe (60)
AFLW	Sarah Allan, Ebony Marinoff	Matthew Clarke	Norwood Oval, Unley Oval	7–0–5	6th	Semi Finals	Ebony Marinoff	Eloise Jones (15)
SANFL	Jack Madgen	Matthew Wright	—N/a	14–0–4	3rd	Semi Finals	Chris Burgess	Chris Burgess (56)

=== Kits ===
Manufacturer: O'Neills
Sponsors: Toyota, Hungry Jack's, Adelaide University

Home	Clash	Gather Round

== Men's squad ==
Reflects the teams squad during their final game of the season.

Adelaide Football Club
Senior list		Rookie list	Coaching staff
1 Chayce Jones; 2 Ben Keays (vc); 3 Sam Berry; 4 Lachlan Murphy; 5 Matt Crouch (ret.); 6 Daniel Curtin; 7 Riley Thilthorpe; 8 Josh Rachele; 9 Nick Murray; 10 Luke Pedlar; 11 Charlie Edwards; 12 Jordan Dawson (c); 13 Taylor Walker; 14 Jake Soligo; 15 Brayden Cook; 16 Max Michalanney; 17 Tyler Welsh; 19 Zac Taylor; 20 Mitch Hinge	22 Oscar Ryan; 23 Izak Rankine; 24 Josh Worrell; 25 James Peatling; 27 Luke Nankervis; 28 Alex Neal-Bullen (vc); 29 Rory Laird; 30 Wayne Milera; 31 Billy Dowling; 32 Darcy Fogarty (vc); 33 Brodie Smith; 34 Sid Draper; 38 Lachlan Sholl; 40 Hugh Bond; 41 Jordon Butts; 43 Reilly O'Brien (vc); 44 Isaac Cumming; 45 Kieran Strachan; 48 Mark Keane	21 Chris Burgess; 26 Harry Schoenberg; 35 James Borlase; 36 Karl Gallagher (B); 39 Toby Murray; 42 Lachlan McAndrew	Head coach: Matthew Nicks; Assistant coaches: Murray Davis (director); Scott Burns (senior assistant & forwards); Nathan van Berlo (midfield); Jack Hombsch (defence); Sam Baulderstone (ruck); Michael Godden (head of development); Chelsea Randall (development); Andrew McPherson (development); Legend: (c) Captain(s); (vc) Vice-captain(s); (B) – Category B rookie; italics – Inactive player list; (ret.) – Retired; Long-term injury; Updated: 10 October 2026; Source(s): Senior list, Rookie list, Coaching staff, Injuries

=== Squad changes ===
The following off-season changes were made to the squad prior to the 2025 season.

==== Out ====
No.	Name	Position	New Club	via	Ref.
9	(Victoria (state)) Rory Sloane	Midfielder	—	Retirement	
34	(New South Wales) Elliott Himmelberg	Forward	Gold Coast	Unrestricted free agent	
17	(Victoria (state)) Will Hamill	Defender	Frankston	Delisted	
25	(Victoria (state)) Ned McHenry	Forward	Prince Alfred College	Delisted	
37	(Victoria (state)) Patrick Parnell	Defender	Glenelg	Delisted	
44	(Victoria (state)) Lachlan Gollant	Forward	Williamstown	Delisted	
21	(South Australia) Chris Burgess	Forward	Adelaide	Delisted	
26	(South Australia) Harry Schoenberg	Midfielder	Adelaide	Delisted	

==== In ====
No.	Name	Position	Previous club	via	Ref.
39	(New South Wales) Toby Murray	Forward	Adelaide (SANFL)	No. 7, 2024 mid-season rookie draft	
44	(South Australia) Isaac Cumming	Defender	Greater Western Sydney	2024 free agency	
28	(South Australia) Alex Neal-Bullen	Forward	Melbourne	2024 trade	
25	(New South Wales) James Peatling	Midfielder	Greater Western Sydney	2024 trade	
34	(South Australia) Sid Draper	Midfielder	South Adelaide	No. 4, 2024 national draft	
17	(South Australia) Tyler Welsh	Forward	Adelaide (SANFL)	No. 59 (F/S), 2024 national draft	
26	(South Australia) Harry Schoenberg	Midfielder	Adelaide	No. 3, 2025 rookie draft	
21	(South Australia) Chris Burgess	Forward	Adelaide	No. 16, 2025 rookie draft	
42	(New South Wales) Lachlan McAndrew	Ruck	Sydney	Pre-season supplemental selection	

Italics: Relisted as a rookie

== Men's AFL season ==
=== Pre-season matches ===
Adelaide's 2025 practice match and AFL Community Series fixtures
Date and local time	Opponent	Scores			Venue	Ref.
Date and local time	Opponent	Home	Away	Result	Venue	Ref.
Friday, 21 February (5:00 pm)	Port Adelaide	14.5 (89)	8.9 (57)	Won by 32 points	Summit Sport and Recreation Park	
Thursday, 27 February (7:10 pm)	Brisbane Lions	13.16 (94)	14.13 (97)	Won by 3 points	Springfield Central Stadium	

Score after three periods, primarily contested between senior squads

=== Regular season ===
Adelaide's 2025 AFL season fixture
Round	Date and local time	Opponent	Home	Away	Result	Venue	Attendance	Ladder position	Ref.
Round	Date and local time	Opponent	Scores			Venue	Attendance	Ladder position	Ref.
0	Bye							5th	Bye
1	Sunday, 16 March (12:05 pm)	St Kilda	21.9 (135)	10.12 (72)	Won by 63 points	Adelaide Oval (H)	42,895	5th	
2	Saturday, 22 March (12:50 pm)	Essendon	15.10 (100)	25.11 (161)	Won by 61 points	Melbourne Cricket Ground (A)	46,688	2nd ▲	
3	Sunday, 30 March (2:50 pm)	North Melbourne	17.12 (114)	12.6 (78)	Won by 36 points	Adelaide Oval (H)	46,511	2nd	
4	Saturday, 5 April (12:50 pm)	Gold Coast	13.13 (91)	14.6 (90)	Lost by 1 point	Carrara Stadium (A)	16,211	5th ▼	
5	Thursday, 10 April (7:10 pm)	Geelong	15.10 (100)	18.11 (119)	Lost by 19 points	Adelaide Oval (N)	50,073	7th ▼	
6	Saturday, 19 April (3:45 pm)	Greater Western Sydney	7.10 (52)	4.10 (34)	Won by 18 points	Adelaide Oval (H)	40,062	5th ▲	
7	Friday, 25 April (7:40 pm)	Fremantle	12.13 (85)	9.13 (67)	Lost by 18 points	Perth Stadium (A)	53,048	5th	
8	Saturday, 3 May (3:45 pm)	Carlton	16.14 (110)	7.8 (50)	Won by 60 points	Adelaide Oval (H)	46,057	5th	
9	Saturday, 10 May (7:40 pm)	Port Adelaide	12.12 (84)	13.11 (89)	Won by 5 points	Adelaide Oval (A)	53,117	5th	
10	Saturday, 17 May (12:50 pm)	Collingwood	11.12 (78)	10.8 (68)	Lost by 10 points	Melbourne Cricket Ground (A)	67,697	6th ▼	
11	Sunday, 25 May (12:40 pm)	West Coast	19.14 (128)	8.14 (62)	Won by 66 points	Adelaide Oval (H)	39,271	4th ▲	
12	Saturday, 31 May (7:05 pm)	Sydney	5.11 (41)	12.5 (131)	Won by 90 points	Sydney Cricket Ground (A)	35,229	3rd ▲	
13	Friday, 6 June (7:10 pm)	Brisbane Lions	10.8 (68)	8.15 (63)	Won by 5 points	Adelaide Oval (H)	42,921	3rd	
14	Friday, 13 June (7:10 pm)	Hawthorn	6.11 (47)	5.14 (44)	Lost by 3 points	York Park (A)	15,129	4th ▼	
15	Bye							4th	Bye
16	Sunday, 29 June (3:20 pm)	Richmond	8.6 (54)	18.14 (122)	Won by 68 points	Melbourne Cricket Ground (A)	23,231	3rd ▲	
17	Sunday, 6 July (2:50 pm)	Melbourne	11.11 (77)	13.12 (90)	Won by 13 points	Adelaide Oval (H)	43,306	3rd	
18	Saturday, 12 July (1:20 pm)	Western Bulldogs	15.8 (98)	16.13 (109)	Won by 11 points	Docklands Stadium (A)	41,198	3rd	
19	Sunday, 20 July (4:10 pm)	Gold Coast	16.11 (107)	6.10 (46)	Won by 61 points	Adelaide Oval (H)	44,249	3rd	
20	Saturday, 26 July (7:40 pm)	Port Adelaide	20.13 (133)	5.5 (35)	Won by 98 points	Adelaide Oval (H)	46,018	2nd ▲	
21	Friday, 1 August (7:10 pm)	Hawthorn	15.11 (101)	13.9 (87)	Won by 14 points	Adelaide Oval (H)	50,654	1st ▲	
22	Sunday, 10 August (3:10 pm)	West Coast	12.6 (78)	13.9 (87)	Won by 9 points	Perth Stadium (A)	32,845	1st	
23	Saturday, 16 August (7:05 pm)	Collingwood	9.5 (59)	8.8 (56)	Won by 3 points	Adelaide Oval (H)	54,283	1st	
24	Saturday, 23 August (1:20 pm)	North Melbourne	15.10 (100)	17.11 (113)	Won by 13 points	Docklands Stadium (A)	17,494	1st	

Opening Round
Gather Round
Originally scheduled at Eureka Stadium

=== Ladder ===
Pos	Team	Pld	W	L	D	PF	PA	PP	Pts	Qualification
1	Adelaide	23	18	5	0	2278	1635	139.3	72	Finals series
2	Geelong	23	17	6	0	2425	1714	141.5	68	Finals series
3	Brisbane Lions (P)	23	16	6	1	2061	1804	114.2	66	Finals series
4	Collingwood	23	16	7	0	1991	1627	122.4	64	Finals series
5	Greater Western Sydney	23	16	7	0	2114	1834	115.3	64	Finals series
6	Fremantle	23	16	7	0	1978	1815	109.0	64	Finals series
7	Gold Coast	23	15	8	0	2173	1740	124.9	60	Finals series
8	Hawthorn	23	15	8	0	2045	1691	120.9	60	Finals series
9	Western Bulldogs	23	14	9	0	2493	1820	137.0	56	
10	Sydney	23	12	11	0	1845	1902	97.0	48	
11	Carlton	23	9	14	0	1799	1861	96.7	36	
12	St Kilda	23	9	14	0	1839	2077	88.5	36	
13	Port Adelaide	23	9	14	0	1705	2136	79.8	36	
14	Melbourne	23	7	16	0	1902	2038	93.3	28	
15	Essendon	23	6	17	0	1535	2209	69.5	24	
16	North Melbourne	23	5	17	1	1805	2365	76.3	22	
17	Richmond	23	5	18	0	1449	2197	66.0	20	
18	West Coast	23	1	22	0	1466	2438	60.1	4	

Source: afl.com.au
Rules for classification: 1) points; 2) percentage; 3) number of points for
(P) Premiers

=== Finals ===
Adelaide's 2025 AFL Finals series
Match	Date and local time	Opponent	Home	Away	Result	Venue	Attendance	Ref.
Match	Date and local time	Opponent	Scores			Venue	Attendance	Ref.
QF	Thursday, 4 September (7:10 pm)	Collingwood	8.7 (55)	11.13 (79)	Lost by 24 points	Adelaide Oval	52,187	
SF	Friday, 12 September (7:10 pm)	Hawthorn	10.7 (67)	14.17 (101)	Lost by 34 points	Adelaide Oval	52,005	

== Men's summary ==
=== Milestones ===
Games milestones

- Round 1: Milera (100 games)
- Round 3: Laird (250 games)
- Round 5: Michalanney (50 games)
- Round 5: Peatling (50 games)
- Round 14: Keays (150 games)
- Round 18: Rankine (100 games)
- Round 20: Nicks (300 games played/coached)
- Round 20: Dawson (150 games)
- Round 20: Keane (50 games)
- Round 21: Cumming (100 games)
- Round 21: Worrell (50 games)
- Finals week 1: Neal-Bullen (200 games)
- Finals week 1: Walker (300 games)

Goals milestones

- Round 4: Walker (650 goals)
- Round 5: Keays (100 goals)
- Round 19: Thilthorpe (100 goals)

Debuts

- Round 1: Cumming (club debut)
- Round 1: Draper (AFL debut)
- Round 1: Neal-Bullen (club debut)
- Round 1: Peatling (club debut)

AFL Life Membership

- Round 2: Walker (300 official matches)
- Round 5: Nicks (300 official matches)

=== AFL Awards & Nominations ===
2025 All-Australian team

- Final team: Dawson (vc), Thilthorpe
- 44-man squad: Keane, Rankine, Worrell

AFL Rising Star

- Round 13 nominee: Curtin

22under22 team

- Extended squad: Soligo
- Final team: Curtin, Michalanney, Rachele

AFL Player's Association Awards

- Best captain winner: Dawson
- Most valuable player nominees: Dawson, Thilthorpe, Worrell
- Best first-year player nominee: Draper
- Most courageous player nominee: Worrell

== Women's squad ==
Adelaide Football Club (AFL Women's)
Senior list		Rookie list	Coaching staff
1 Caitlin Gould; 2 Eloise Jones; 3 Brooke Boileau; 4 Zoe Prowse; 5 Rachelle Martin; 6 Hannah Munyard; 8 India Rasheed; 9 Hannah Ewings; 10 Ebony Marinoff (c); 11 Sarah Goodwin; 12 Chelsea Biddell; 13 Kiera Mueller; 14 Stevie-Lee Thompson; 15 Danielle Ponter	16 Georgia McKee; 17 Maddi Newman; 18 Brooke Smith; 20 Grace Kelly; 21 Lily Tarlinton; 23 Niamh Kelly; 25 Teah Charlton; 26 Chelsea Randall; 27 Abbie Ballard; 28 Brooke Tonon; 32 Jess Allan; 33 Anne Hatchard; 39 Sarah Allan (c)	19 Christina Leuzzi; 22 Kayleigh Cronin; 24 Amy Boyle-Carr	Head coach: Matthew Clarke; Assistant coaches: Marijana Randall (defenders); Courtney Cramey (midfielders); Kieran Strachan (rucks); Jack Madgen (forwards); Peter Caven; Leah Kaslar; Emma Sampson (development and scrimmage); Warwick Raymond; Legend: (c) Captain(s); (vc) Vice-captain(s); italics - Inactive player list; Long-term injury; Updated: 10 October 2026; Source(s): Players, Coaches

=== Squad changes ===
The following off-season changes were made to the squad prior to the 2024 season.

==== Out ====
No.	Name	Position	New Club	via	Ref.
9	(South Australia) Deni Varnhagen	Midfielder	Glenelg	Retirement	
8	Najwa Allen	Defender	Hawthorn	2024 trade	
16	(South Australia) Taylah Levy	Forward	Greater Western Sydney	2024 trade	
19	(South Australia) Jess Waterhouse	Forward	South Adelaide	Delisted	
20	(Victoria (state)) Tamara Henry	Midfielder	Collingwood VFLW	Delisted	

==== In ====
No.	Name	Position	Previous club	via	Ref.
9	(South Australia) Hannah Ewings	Forward	Port Adelaide	2024 trade	
20	(Republic of Ireland) Grace Kelly	Forward	St Kilda	2024 trade	
22	(Republic of Ireland) Kayleigh Cronin	Defender	Kerry GAA	2024 rookie signing	
8	(South Australia) India Rasheed	Midfielder	Sturt	No. 13, 2024 national draft	
16	(South Australia) Georgia McKee	Forward	Central District	No. 44, 2024 national draft	
19	(South Australia) Christina Leuzzi	Defender	Woodville-West Torrens	Replacement signing	

== Women's AFLW season ==
=== Pre-season matches ===
Adelaide's 2025 practice match fixtures
Date and local time	Opponent	Scores			Venue	Ref.
Date and local time	Opponent	Home	Away	Result	Venue	Ref.
Saturday, 12 April (10:30 am)	Sydney	4.3 (27)	1.3 (9)	Lost by 18 points	Tramway Oval	
Saturday, 26 April	Sydney	5.6 (36)	2.1 (13)	Lost by 23 points	Blacktown ISP Oval	
Saturday, 3 May	Sydney	4.4 (28)	10.10 (70)	Lost by 42 points	Football Park	
Saturday, 26 July (11:00 am)	Port Adelaide	7.7 (49)	6.11 (47)	Lost by 2 points	Alberton Oval	
Sunday, 3 August (11:00 am)	Melbourne	5.8 (38)	8.4 (52)	Lost by 14 points	Unley Oval	

Eight of Adelaide's players combined with Brisbane's team to play Sydney.

=== Regular season ===
Adelaide's 2025 AFL Women's season fixture
Round	Date and local time	Opponent	Home	Away	Result	Venue	Attendance	Ladder position	Ref.
Round	Date and local time	Opponent	Scores			Venue	Attendance	Ladder position	Ref.
1	Sunday, 17 August (2:10 pm)	St Kilda	6.5 (41)	2.7 (19)	Lost by 22 points	Moorabbin Oval (A)	1,670	14th ▼	
2	Sunday, 24 August (2:35 pm)	Geelong	10.5 (65)	3.9 (27)	Won by 38 points	Unley Oval (H)	3,088	8th ▲	
3	Saturday, 30 August (1:05 pm)	Greater Western Sydney	2.10 (22)	7.12 (54)	Won by 32 points	Henson Park (A)	1,556	6th ▲	
4	Sunday, 7 September (12:35 pm)	Brisbane	6.2 (38)	6.5 (41)	Lost by 3 points	Norwood Oval (H)	1,517	8th ▼	
5	Sunday, 14 September (3:05 pm)	Hawthorn	4.3 (27)	7.6 (48)	Won by 21 points	Frankston Park (A)	2,401	6th ▲	
6	Sunday, 21 September (5:05 pm)	Gold Coast	5.4 (34)	7.8 (50)	Won by 16 points	Carrara Stadium (A)	1,252	4th ▲	
7	Sunday, 28 September (2:35 pm)	Sydney	6.5 (41)	6.3 (39)	Won by 2 points	Unley Oval (H)	2,829	4th	
8	Sunday, 5 October (1:05 pm)	Richmond	8.10 (58)	6.11 (47)	Lost by 11 points	Princes Park (A)	1,309	7th ▼	
9	Saturday, 11 October (12:35 pm)	West Coast	7.6 (48)	4.7 (31)	Won by 17 points	Norwood Oval (H)	2,738	5th ▲	
10	Saturday, 18 October (3:05 pm)	North Melbourne	10.11 (71)	5.1 (31)	Lost by 40 points	Arden Street Oval (A)	3,282	7th ▼	
11	Friday, 24 October (7:05 pm)	Port Adelaide	6.9 (45)	7.10 (52)	Lost by 7 points	Norwood Oval (H)	5,434	8th ▼	
12	Sunday, 2 November (4:35 pm)	Fremantle	4.5 (29)	2.5 (17)	Won by 12 points	Norwood Oval (H)	1,225	6th ▲	

=== Finals ===
Adelaide's 2025 AFL Women's Finals series
Match	Date and local time	Opponent	Home	Away	Result	Venue	Attendance	Ref.
Match	Date and local time	Opponent	Scores			Venue	Attendance	Ref.
EF	Sunday, 9 November (2:35 pm)	St Kilda	8.12 (60)	2.4 (16)	Won by 44 points	Norwood Oval (H)	3,228	
SF	Saturday, 15 November (1:05 pm)	Melbourne	9.6 (60)	7.7 (49)	Lost by 11 points	Princes Park (A)	2,624	

=== Ladder ===
Pos	Team	Pld	W	L	D	PF	PA	PP	Pts	Qualification
1	North Melbourne (P)	12	12	0	0	868	270	321.5	48	Finals series
2	Melbourne	12	9	3	0	684	327	209.2	36	Finals series
3	Brisbane	12	9	3	0	652	403	161.8	36	Finals series
4	Hawthorn	12	9	3	0	451	433	104.2	36	Finals series
5	Carlton	12	8	4	0	554	474	116.9	32	Finals series
6	Adelaide	12	7	5	0	515	460	112.0	28	Finals series
7	St Kilda	12	7	5	0	392	407	96.3	28	Finals series
8	West Coast	12	6	6	0	472	423	111.6	24	Finals series
9	Sydney	12	6	6	0	542	504	107.5	24	
10	Port Adelaide	12	6	6	0	631	601	105.0	24	
11	Fremantle	12	6	6	0	414	512	80.9	24	
12	Western Bulldogs	12	5	7	0	415	358	115.9	20	
13	Geelong	12	5	7	0	500	539	92.8	20	
14	Essendon	12	4	8	0	331	552	60.0	16	
15	Collingwood	12	3	9	0	314	505	62.2	12	
16	Richmond	12	2	10	0	349	583	59.9	8	
17	Greater Western Sydney	12	2	10	0	401	681	58.9	8	
18	Gold Coast	12	2	10	0	319	772	41.3	8	

Source: afl.com.au
Rules for classification: 1) points; 2) percentage; 3) number of points for
(P) Premiers

== Women's summary ==
=== Milestones ===
Games milestones

- Round 2: Randall (75 games)
- Round 2: Ponter (75 games)
- Round 5: J. Allan (50 games)
- Round 6: Jones (75 games)
- Round 7: Marinoff (100 games)
- Round 11: Hatchard (100 games)
- Finals week 1: Biddell (75 games)

Debuts

- Round 1: Cronin (AFLW debut)
- Round 1: Ewings (club debut)
- Round 1: G. Kelly (club debut)
- Round 1: Rasheed (AFLW debut)
- Round 9: Leuzzi (AFLW debut)

=== AFL Awards & Nominations ===
2025 AFL Women's All-Australian team

- 44-player squad: N. Kelly, Marinoff

AFL Women's Rising Star

- Round 7 nominee: Boileau
- Round 11 nominee: Rasheed

22under22 team

- Extended squad: Prowse
- Final team: Boileau, Goodwin

AFL Player's Association Awards

- Best captain nominee: Marinoff, S. Allan
- Most valuable player nominees: Jones, Marinoff, Newman
- Best first-year player nominee: Rasheed
- Most courageous player nominee: Prowse

== Reserves squad ==
Adelaide Football Club (SANFL)
Development squad		Coaching staff
2 Ned Atkinson; 12 Jay Boyle; 14 Hugh Haysman; 16 Cameron Taheny; 36 Andrew McPherson; 37 Blake Drury; 43 Saxon Evans; 46 Jack Madgen (c); 47 Jayden Davis; 50 Darcy Clifford; 51 Jay O'Leary; 51 Will Crane	52 Steve Burton; 54 Tate Coleman; 55 Stephen Tahana; 56 Austin McDonald; 58 Dylan Whimpress; 59 Thomas McCormack; 59 Lachlan Thomas; 60 Harry Boyle; 62 Harry Cook	Head coach: Matthew Wright; Assistant coaches: Michael Godden (head of development); Andrew McPherson; Matthew Panos; Chelsea Randall; Legend: (c) Captain(s); (vc) Vice-captain(s); (i) Inactive; Updated: 10 October 2026; Source(s): Players, Coaches

== Reserves SANFL season ==
=== Pre-season matches ===
Adelaide's 2025 practice match fixtures
Date and local time	Opponent	Scores			Venue	Ref.
Date and local time	Opponent	Home	Away	Result	Venue	Ref.
Friday, 21 February (5:00 pm)	Port Adelaide	8.6 (48)	6.6 (36)	Won by 12 points	Summit Sport and Recreation Park	
Friday, 28 February (5:40 pm)	Woodville-West Torrens	14.9 (93)	5.13 (43)	Won by 50 points	Football Park	
Sunday, 16 March (9:00 pm)	South Adelaide	6.7 (43)	12.13 (85)	Won by 42 points	Alberton Oval	

Score after three periods, primarily contested between reserves squads

=== Regular season ===
SANFL fixture Crowd numbers

Adelaide's 2025 SANFL season fixture
Round	Date and local time	Opponent	Home	Away	Result	Venue	Attendance	Ladder position	Ref.
Round	Date and local time	Opponent	Scores			Venue	Attendance	Ladder position	Ref.
1	Saturday, 29 March (2:10 pm)	West Adelaide	4.7 (31)	18.18 (126)	Won by 95 points	Richmond Oval	1,362	1st	
2	Saturday, 5 April (2:40 pm)	North Adelaide	13.7 (85)	17.12 (114)	Won by 29 points	Prospect Oval	2,021	2nd ▼	
3	Friday, 18 April (4:10 pm)	Glenelg	14.10 (94)	14.14 (98)	Won by 4 points	Glenelg Oval	5,231	1st ▲	
4	Sunday, 27 April (2:10 pm)	Woodville-West Torrens	14.6 (90)	9.15 (69)	Lost by 21 points	Woodville Oval	1,332	3rd ▼	
5	Sunday, 4 May	Norwood	8.20 (68)	14.5 (89)	Won by 21 points	Port Lincoln	1,815	3rd	
6	Saturday, 10 May (3:10 pm)	Port Adelaide	5.13 (43)	13.10 (88)	Won by 45 points	Adelaide Oval	—N/a	3rd	
7	Saturday, 24 May (2:30 pm)	Sturt	15.8 (98)	12.3 (75)	Lost by 23 points	Unley Oval	2,984	4th ▼	
8	Bye							4th	Bye
9	Saturday, 7 June (2:30 pm)	South Adelaide	7.8 (50)	7.9 (51)	Won by 1 point	Hickinbotham Oval	978	3rd ▲	
10	Saturday, 14 June (1:10 pm)	Central District	4.9 (33)	11.12 (78)	Won by 45 points	Elizabeth Oval	1,192	3rd	
11	Saturday, 28 June (2:10 pm)	North Adelaide	10.4 (64)	23.8 (148)	Won by 84 points	Prospect Oval	1,675	3rd	
12	Sunday, 6 July (11:15 am)	Woodville-West Torrens	22.17 (149)	7.7 (49)	Won by 100 points	Adelaide Oval	—N/a	3rd	
13	Saturday, 12 July (2:10 pm)	Glenelg	17.9 (111)	13.5 (83)	Lost by 28 points	Glenelg Oval	1,386	3rd	
14	Saturday, 19 July (2:30 pm)	West Adelaide	12.7 (79)	21.14 (140)	Won by 61 points	Richmond Oval	822	3rd	
15	Saturday, 26 July (4:10 pm)	Port Adelaide	12.22 (94)	12.7 (79)	Won by 15 points	Adelaide Oval	—N/a	3rd	
16	Saturday, 2 August (1:10 pm)	Norwood	8.15 (63)	12.11 (83)	Won by 20 points	Norwood Oval	1,362	3rd	
17	Saturday, 9 August (2:10 pm)	South Adelaide	8.8 (56)	12.11 (83)	Won by 27 points	Hickinbotham Oval	990	3rd	
18	Saturday, 16 August (2:30 pm)	Central District	9.7 (61)	9.6 (60)	Lost by 1 point	Elizabeth Oval	982	3rd	
19	Saturday, 23 August	Sturt	13.9 (87)	14.5 (89)	Won by 2 points	Unley Oval	5,595	3rd	

=== Ladder ===
Pos	Team	Pld	W	L	D	PF	PA	PP	Pts	Qualification
1	Sturt	18	17	1	0	1924	1089	63.86	34	Finals series
2	Glenelg	18	15	3	0	1818	1197	60.30	30	Finals series
3	Adelaide (R)	18	14	4	0	1717	1241	58.05	28	Finals series
4	Central District	18	11	7	0	1368	1288	51.51	22	Finals series
5	Norwood	18	8	10	0	1431	1286	52.67	16	Finals series
6	Port Adelaide (R)	18	7	11	0	1370	1541	47.06	14	
7	Woodville-West Torrens	18	7	11	0	1176	1626	41.97	14	
8	South Adelaide	18	4	14	0	1154	1455	44.23	8	
9	North Adelaide	18	4	14	0	1249	1723	42.03	8	
10	West Adelaide	18	3	15	0	1063	1824	36.82	6	

Updated to match(es) played on 3 August 2025. Source: sanfl.com.au
Rules for classification: 1) points; 2) percentage; 3) number of points for.

=== Finals ===
Adelaide's 2025 SANFL Finals series
Match	Date and local time	Opponent	Home	Away	Result	Venue	Attendance	Ref.
Match	Date and local time	Opponent	Scores			Venue	Attendance	Ref.
QF	Sunday, 31 August (3:15 pm)	Glenelg	10.14 (74)	11.7 (75)	Lost by 1 point	Adelaide Oval	7,782	
SF	Sunday, 7 September (12:15 pm)	Norwood	10.10 (70)	15.14 (104)	Lost by 34 points	Adelaide Oval	11,072	

== Reserves summary ==
=== SANFL Awards & Nominations ===
- SANFL Team of the Year: Burgess, Madgen, McAndrew
