= Madgen =

Madgen is a surname. Notable people with the surname include:

- Ben Madgen (born 1985), Australian basketball player
- Jack Madgen (born 1993), Australian rules footballer and basketballer
- Tess Madgen (born 1990), Australian basketball player
