= Max Michalanney =

Australian footballer (born 2004)

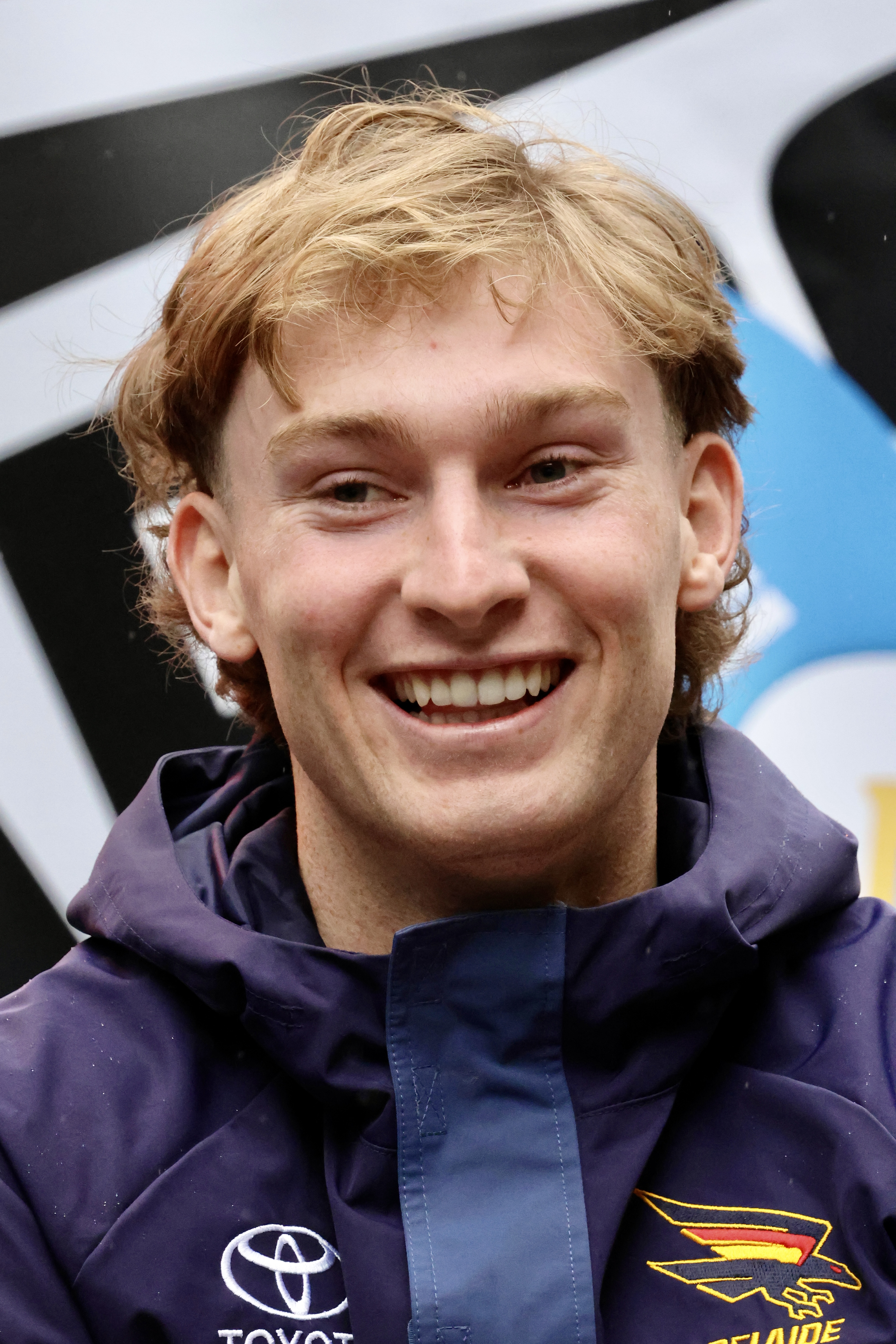
- Michalanney at the 2026 Gather Round

Personal information
- Full name: Max Michalanney
- Born: 26 February 2004 (age 22); South Australia
- Original team: Norwood (SANFL)
- Draft: No. 17 (F/S), 2022 national draft
- Debut: Round 1, 2023, Adelaide vs. Greater Western Sydney, at Sydney Showground Stadium
- Height: 190 cm (6 ft 3 in)
- Weight: 80 kg (176 lb)
- Position: Defender

Club information
- Current club: Adelaide
- Number: 16

Playing career^{1}
Years	Club	Games (Goals)
2023–	Adelaide	87 (4)
- ^{1} Playing statistics correct to the end of round 22, 2026.

Career highlights
- 22under22 team: 2025; AFL Rising Star nominee: 2023; Mark Bickley Emerging Talent Award: 2023

Max Michalanney (born 26 February 2004) is a professional Australian rules football player who plays for Adelaide Football Club in the Australian Football League (AFL).

== Early life ==
Michalanney is the son of Jim Michalanney who played 211 games and won 4 premierships with Norwood in the South Australian National Football League (SANFL). Max also has a younger brother named Jack who played for Norwood.

As a junior he progressed to play three senior games for Norwood in the SANFL. He previously played junior football for Glenunga Rams and school football for Rostrevor. Despite living in the Sturt development zone, he was able to join Norwood under the SANFL father-son rule. While representing South Australia in the National Championships he was rewarded for his consistency by winning All-Australian selection.

== AFL career ==
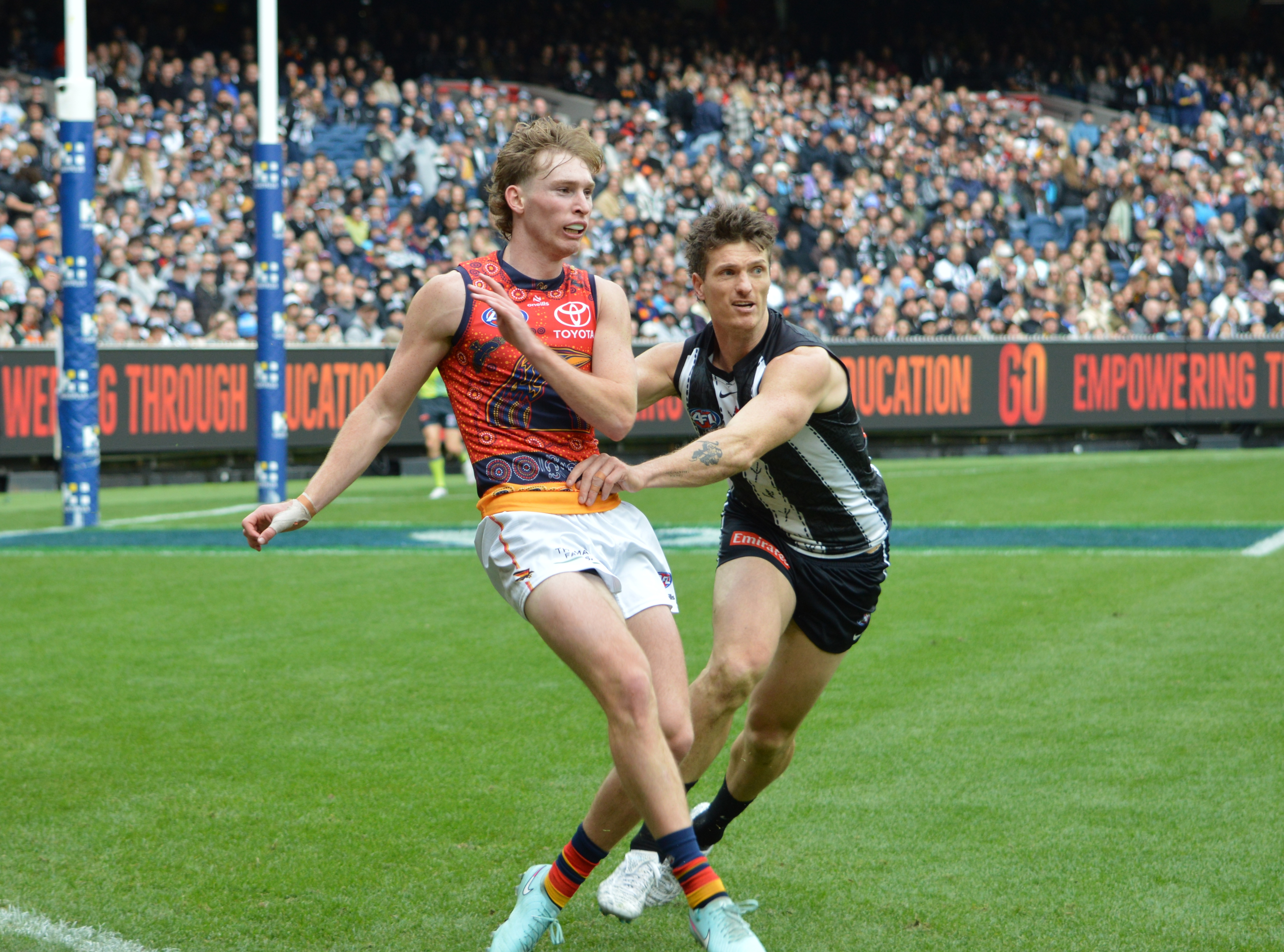
Michalanney gets a kick past Brody Mihocek of Collingwood in 2025

Michalanney was drafted by Adelaide with pick 17 of the 2022 national draft under the father–son rule, after they matched a bid by Sydney Swans. He impressed in pre-season, including in a practice match against West Coast during which he limited Liam Ryan to 10 touches. The following week, the club confirmed he would debut in the first round of the season. He collected 12 disposals his first game against Greater Western Sydney in Round 1 of the 2023 AFL season. In Round 4 of 2023, Michalanney had a strong defensive showing, collecting 16 disposals, was rewarded with five coach votes, and was praised by former player and coach Nathan Buckley. In Round 5 of 2023, after a dominant display against Carlton in which he had 10 disposals and 4 marks, Michalanney was nominated for the 2023 AFL Rising Star. Michalanney credited his good start to the season to his father's mantra, which may have influenced his signature on a two-year contract during Adelaide's bye round of 2023, securing him at the club until the end of 2026. Michalanney was the recipient of the Mark Bickley Emerging Talent Award in 2023, awarded to Adelaide's highest achieving player under the age of 21.

2024 was a year of continued growth for Michalanney, who became a strong player in Adelaide's defence. He spent a small amount of time in Adelaide's midfield when star players were out of form, particularly in round 13 against Richmond. The move resulted in a career-best 25 disposals and 11 marks, but ultimately Michalanney returned to his defensive role. He found himself in strife when he escaped suspension after striking Hawthorn forward Nick Watson. Michalanney's season was rewarded with a nomination in the 22under22 squad, but failed to qualify for the final team. Michalanney finished fourth in the Malcolm Blight Medal in just his second season at AFL level.

Prior to the 2025 season, Michalanney played an internal trial match in Port Pirie and dislocated a thumb. Avoiding the need for surgery, his pre-season was cut short but managed to return in time for round one of the season. Michalaney kicked his first career goal in the round 6 win over Greater Western Sydney. Also keeping direct opponent Toby Greene to minimum impact, the defender picked up five coaches votes. In round 16 against Richmond, Michalanney moved forward in an attempt to quell the efforts of defender Nick Vlastuin. He successfully limited Vlastuin to only three intercept possessions, while kicking three goals of his own – the first time he had kicked multiple goals in a game.

== Statistics ==
Updated to the end of round 22, 2026.

Legend
G	Goals	K	Kicks	D	Disposals	T	Tackles
B	Behinds	H	Handballs	M	Marks

Season	Team	No.	Games	Totals							Averages (per game)							Votes
Season	Team	No.	Games	G	B	K	H	D	M	T	G	B	K	H	D	M	T	Votes
2023	Adelaide	16	22	0	0	159	78	237	80	75	0.0	0.0	7.2	3.5	10.8	3.6	3.4	0
2024	Adelaide	16	23	0	1	212	130	342	122	67	0.0	0.0	9.2	5.7	14.9	5.3	2.9	0
2025	Adelaide	16	21	4	2	184	96	280	91	37	0.2	0.1	8.8	4.6	13.3	4.3	1.8	0
2026	Adelaide	16	21	0	0	175	125	300	104	56	0.0	0.0	8.3	6.0	14.3	5.0	2.7	0
Career			87	4	3	730	429	1159	397	235	0.0	0.0	8.4	4.9	13.3	4.6	2.7	0
