= Brodie Smith (footballer) =

Australian rules footballer (born 1992)

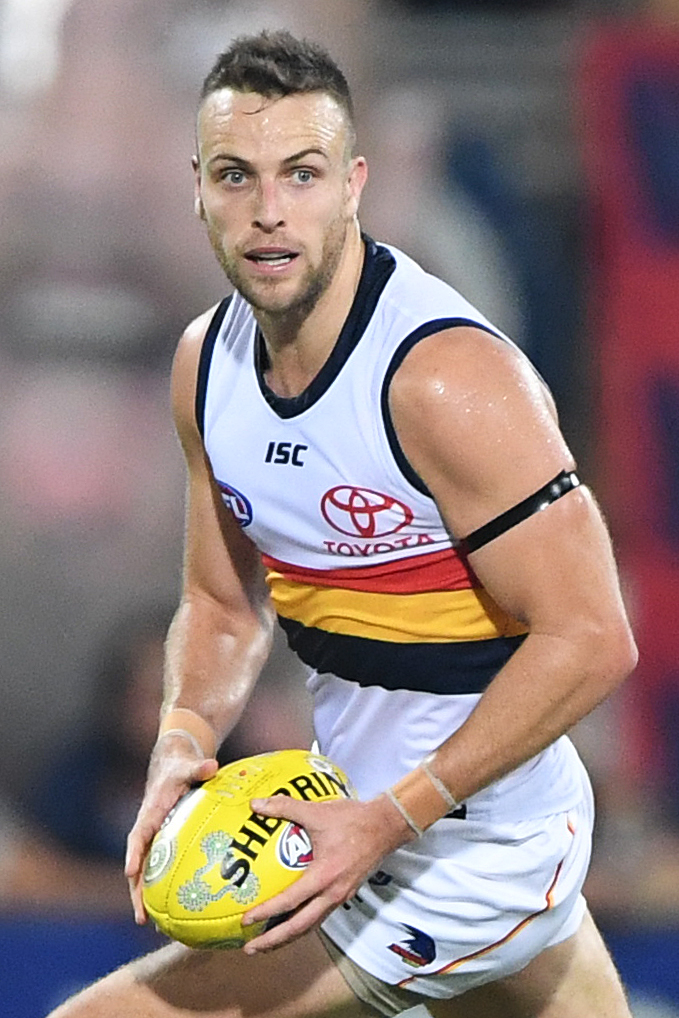
- Smith in June 2019

Personal information
- Full name: Brodie Smith
- Nickname: Smithers
- Born: 14 January 1992 (age 34); Adelaide, South Australia
- Original teams: Henley (SAAFL); Woodville-West Torrens (SANFL)
- Draft: No. 14, 2010 national draft
- Debut: Round 1, 2011, Adelaide vs. Hawthorn, at AAMI Stadium
- Height: 189 cm (6 ft 2 in)
- Weight: 86 kg (190 lb)
- Position: Defender

Club information
- Current club: Adelaide
- Number: 33

Playing career^{1}
Years	Club	Games (Goals)
2011–2025	Adelaide	273 (74)

Representative team honours
Years	Team	Games (Goals)
2020	All Stars	1 (0)

International team honours
	Australia	1 (0)
- ^{1} Playing statistics correct to the end of the 2025 season.

Career highlights
- All-Australian team: 2014; 22under22 team: 2014

Brodie Smith (born 14 January 1992) is a former professional Australian rules football player who played for the Adelaide Football Club in the Australian Football League (AFL). He played 273 games for the club and was an All-Australian in 2014.

== Early life ==
Smith's mother was born in England and his father was born in Scotland, though Smith himself was born in Australia. Growing up in the western suburbs of Adelaide, he supported the Port Adelaide Football Club.

Smith participated in the Auskick program at West Lakes, South Australia. He played senior football for the Henley Football Club in the SAAFL and Woodville West Torrens Football Club in the South Australia National Football League.

Smith was Adelaide's first selection in the 2010 national draft at pick 14 overall.

== AFL career ==
=== Early career ===
Smith made his debut in round 1 of his very first season, 2011, against Hawthorn. He played 14 games in his first season and showed plenty of maturity for a first-year player, averaging 13 disposals per game. He played 22 games including three finals in 2012 as a running defender, shutting down opposition forwards such as Steve Johnson and providing run off half-back, also becoming noted for kicking goals from long range. Despite fracturing his collarbone in the 2013 pre-season, Smith played the final 18 games of the season, continuing to play mainly at half-back. He played his 50th game in round 19 against Port Adelaide and gathered a personal-best 29 possessions in the last game against West Coast.

=== Prime years and All-Australian selection ===
Smith signed a new contract with the Crows early in the 2014 season, keeping him at the club until 2016. He went on to have a career-best year at the club, averaging 23 disposals and ranking first in the competition for long kicks and second for rebound 50s and metres gained. This earned him selection in the All-Australian team and in the Australian international rules football team for the 2014 International Rules Test. Smith remained one of the AFL's most damaging half-backs in 2015, recovering from two concussions early in the season to lead the club in rebound 50s and finish fifth in the AFL for metres gained.

In the First Qualifying Final against Greater Western Sydney in 2017, Smith tore his ACL in the first quarter after kicking the Crows' first goal for the match. The injury unfortunately ended his season and his chances to play in a grand final, but Adelaide went on to win the match by 36 points. Due to the nature of his injury, he missed the majority of the 2018 season.

Smith returned from injury only eleven months later to feature in the last few games of the 2018 AFL season, but went on to play in all 22 games the following year. In 2020, Smith captained the Crows in the absence of Adelaide captain Rory Sloane.

=== Late career ===
Smith, in the absence of captain Rory Sloane, became the captain of the Crows for a few games in 2022. Most notably, Smith was the stand-in captain during the Showdown win in round 3 which was won after the siren.

An underrated player in his later years, Smith achieved a new career-best 37 disposals in a Round 20 clash with Carlton in 2022. Only a few months later, he kicked the first goal in the history of the AFL's Gather Round in 2023. After the 2023 season, Smith took up a temporary role as assistant coach of Adelaide's AFLW team, becoming the defensive coach in the absence of Marijana Rajčić during her maternity leave. He played his 250th AFL game in the round 3, 2024 loss to Fremantle.

Prior to the 2025 season, Smith was involved in physical contact with Port Adelaide's Christian Moraes in a match simulation. The Crow was banned for a week by the AFL, meaning he would miss round one against St Kilda. At times struggling to play his best football, Smith was also demoted from Adelaide's leadership group the following week. He returned to the side during 2025 and made an impact, often playing as the medical substitute. At the conclusion of Adelaide's season, Smith retired from professional football, having played 273 games for the club across 15 years.

== Personal life ==
Smith married partner Lisa McCarthy in November of 2024 following their engagement in January of the same year. The couple announced that they were pregnant with their first child in March 2025.

== Statistics ==
Updated to the end of the 2025 season.

Legend
G	Goals	K	Kicks	D	Disposals	T	Tackles
B	Behinds	H	Handballs	M	Marks

Season	Team	No.	Games	Totals							Averages (per game)							Votes
Season	Team	No.	Games	G	B	K	H	D	M	T	G	B	K	H	D	M	T	Votes
2011	Adelaide	33	14	2	1	107	76	183	38	38	0.1	0.1	7.6	5.4	13.1	2.7	2.7	0
2012	Adelaide	33	22	5	5	230	141	371	82	45	0.2	0.2	10.5	6.4	16.9	3.7	2.0	0
2013	Adelaide	33	18	3	3	223	121	344	69	25	0.2	0.2	12.4	6.7	19.1	3.8	1.4	0
2014	Adelaide	33	22	11	8	287	209	496	108	35	0.5	0.4	13.0	9.5	22.5	4.9	1.6	4
2015	Adelaide	33	21	7	6	266	116	382	82	39	0.3	0.3	12.7	5.5	18.2	3.9	1.9	6
2016	Adelaide	33	23	7	12	305	170	475	100	52	0.3	0.5	13.3	7.4	20.7	4.3	2.3	2
2017	Adelaide	33	23	12	9	289	180	469	107	46	0.5	0.4	12.6	7.8	20.4	4.7	2.0	1
2018	Adelaide	33	2	0	0	17	26	43	10	7	0.0	0.0	8.5	13.0	21.5	5.0	3.5	1
2019	Adelaide	33	22	10	12	326	178	504	109	55	0.5	0.5	14.8	8.1	22.9	5.0	2.5	1
2020 (Note: The 2020 season was played with 17 home-and-away matches per team (down from 22) and 16-minute quarters with time on (down from 20-minute quarters with time on) due to the impact of the COVID-19 pandemic.)	Adelaide	33	16	5	6	203	72	275	58	38	0.3	0.4	12.7	4.5	17.2	3.6	2.4	1
2021	Adelaide	33	21	2	4	332	101	433	107	38	0.1	0.2	15.8	4.8	20.6	5.1	1.8	2
2022	Adelaide	33	21	3	6	307	118	425	86	62	0.1	0.3	14.6	5.6	20.2	4.1	3.0	1
2023	Adelaide	33	22	4	4	334	132	466	109	50	0.2	0.2	15.2	6.0	21.2	5.0	2.3	1
2024	Adelaide	33	15	0	2	167	97	264	53	31	0.0	0.1	11.1	6.5	17.6	3.5	2.1	0
2025	Adelaide	33	11	3	1	94	47	141	34	23	0.3	0.1	8.5	4.3	12.8	3.1	2.1	0
Career			273	74	79	3487	1784	5271	1152	584	0.3	0.3	12.8	6.5	19.3	4.2	2.1	20
