= Ben Madgen =

Australian basketball player

Personal information
- Born: 7 February 1985 (age 41) Williamstown, South Australia, Australia
- Listed height: 193 cm (6 ft 4 in)
- Listed weight: 92 kg (203 lb)

Career information
- High school: Faith Lutheran College (Tanunda, South Australia)
- College: Augusta (2006–2010)
- NBA draft: 2010: undrafted
- Playing career: 2005–2020
- Position: Shooting guard / small forward

Career history
- 2005–2007: Eastern Mavericks
- 2010–2011: Eastern Mavericks
- 2010–2015: Sydney Kings
- 2015–2016: Verviers-Pepinster
- 2016–2017: Lietkabelis Panevėžys
- 2017–2018: Lietuvos rytas Vilnius
- 2018–2019: Crailsheim Merlins
- 2019–2020: South East Melbourne Phoenix

Career highlights
- All-NBL First Team (2013); NBL Most Improved Player (2013); NBL scoring champion (2013); NBL Rookie of the Year (2011); Peach Belt Player of the Year (2010); 2× First-team All-Peach Belt (2009, 2010); Peach Belt Freshman of the Year (2007); No. 1 jersey retired by Augusta Jaguars

Ben Stephen Madgen (born 7 February 1985) is an Australian former professional basketball player.

== Early life and career ==
Born in Williamstown, South Australia, Madgen played basketball at Faith Lutheran College in Tanunda, South Australia and was a member of the 2002 state championship winning team. In 2005, he debuted in the Central ABL for the Eastern Mavericks. For the 2005–06 NBL season, he was a member of the Adelaide 36ers as a development player, but did not play. He re-joined the Mavericks for the 2006 season and then had a short stint again with the Mavericks in 2007. He also played for the Mavericks in 2010 and 2011.

== College career ==
Madgen played four years of college basketball for Augusta State University from 2006 to 2010. Upon completing his college career in 2010, he was the all-time leading scorer for the Jaguars and the Peach Belt Conference with 2,306 points. On 3 March 2010, his No. 1 jersey was retired, becoming the only active Jaguars player to have his jersey retired.

== Professional career ==
=== Sydney Kings ===
Madgen signed with the Sydney Kings for the 2010–11 NBL season and won the NBL Rookie of the Year. In 2012–13, Madgen was named the NBL Most Improved Player and earned All-NBL First Team honours. He led the NBL in scoring in 2012–13 with 17.9 points per game.

On 10 October 2013, Madgen was named in the Sydney Kings 25th Anniversary Team.

On 20 March 2014, Madgen re-signed with the Kings on a two-year deal. On 15 May 2015, he exercised an option in his contract in order to leave the club and pursue playing opportunities in Europe.

=== Belgium ===
On 14 August 2015, Madgen signed with VOO Wolves Verviers-Pepinster of Belgium for the 2015–16 season. In 30 games, he averaged 19.6 points, 4.4 rebounds, 1.4 assists and 1.1 steals per game.

=== Lithuania ===
On 18 August 2016, Madgen signed with Lietkabelis Panevėžys of the Lithuanian League. He helped Lietkabelis reach the LKL finals and the Lithuanian Cup final, losing in both to BC Žalgiris.

On 17 June 2017, Madgen signed with Lietuvos rytas, returning to Lithuania for a second stint. Madgen once again played in the LKL finals and the Cup final, but once again lost both to Žalgiris.

=== Germany ===
In August 2018, Madgen signed with the Crailsheim Merlins of the Basketball Bundesliga. He was the leading scorer and rebounder for the Merlins.

=== South East Melbourne Phoenix ===
On 19 February 2019, Madgen signed with the South East Melbourne Phoenix, a franchise entering the NBL for the 2019–20 season.

On 13 July 2020, Madgen announced his retirement from playing basketball to focus on his family.

== National team career ==
After being selected in the Boomers squad for the Sino-Australia Challenge against China in June 2013, Madgen sustained a right ankle subtalar dislocation during training only a day after game one of the four-game series.

== Personal ==
Madgen is the son of Gene and Deborah Madgen, and has a brother, Jack, and two sisters, Carly and Tess. His brother Jack originally played basketball before switching to football. His sister Tess also plays basketball.

In May 2014, Madgen married Bria Kirk.

In 2014, Madgen was studying a Master of Business Administration.

In 2021, after receiving his second Pfizer vaccine, he was diagnosed with pericarditis.

In March 2022, Madgen joined the Sydney Comets as their development manager and was later appointed the club's CEO. He remained in the CEO role as of January 2024.
