= James Peatling =

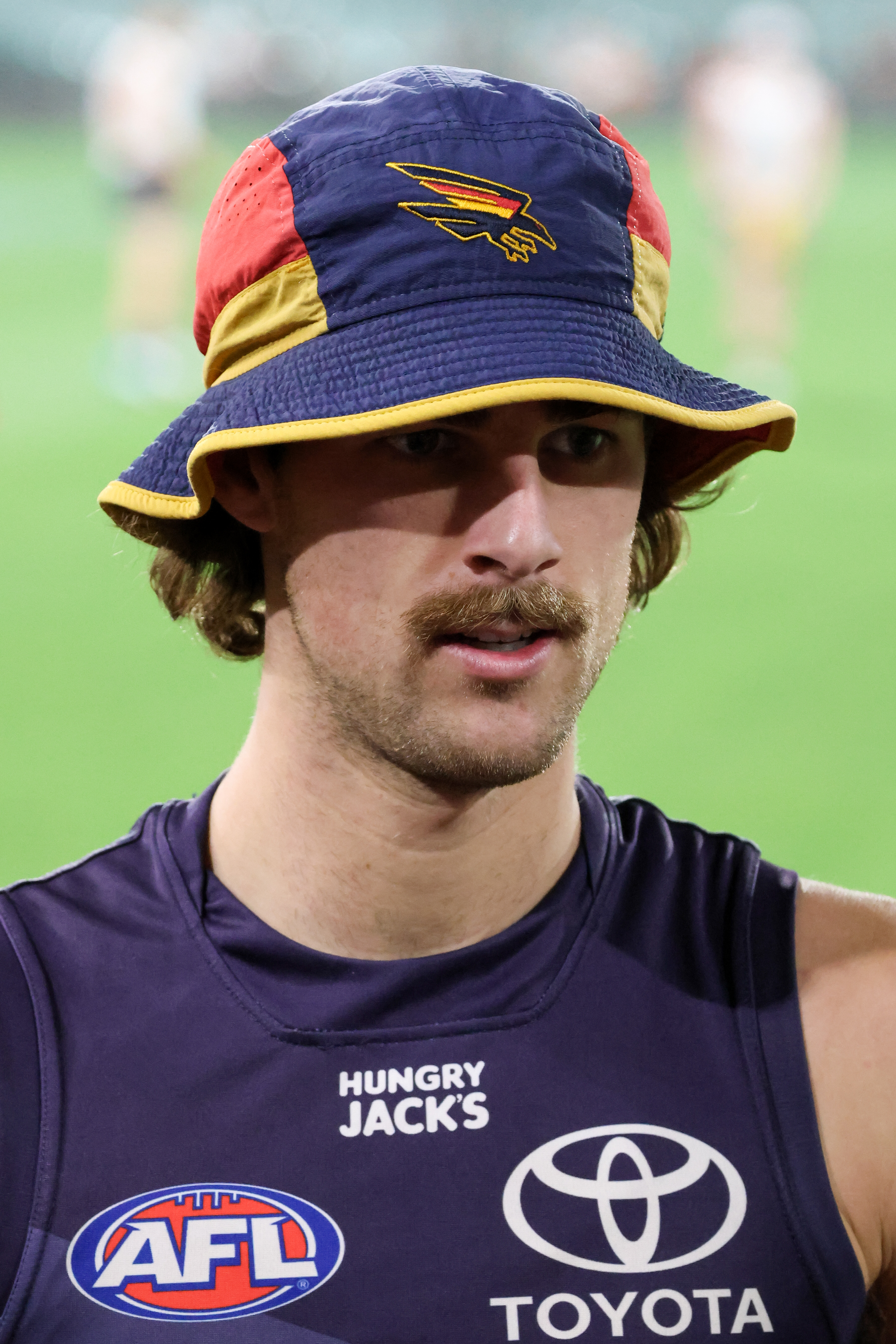
- Peatling with Adelaide in 2026

Personal information
- Full name: James Peatling
- Nicknames: Jappa, JP
- Born: 21 August 2000 (age 26); Sydney, New South Wales
- Original teams: Greater Western Sydney (VFL); GIANTS Academy (Talent League); Pennant Hills (AFL Sydney)
- Draft: No. 8, 2021 mid-season rookie draft
- Debut: Round 20, 2021, Greater Western Sydney vs. Port Adelaide, at Docklands Stadium
- Height: 186 cm (6 ft 1 in)
- Weight: 73 kg (161 lb)
- Position: Midfielder

Club information
- Current club: Adelaide
- Number: 25

Playing career^{1}
Years	Club	Games (Goals)
2021–2024	Greater Western Sydney	45 (16)
2025–	Adelaide	43 (16)
Total		87 (32)
- ^{1} Playing statistics correct to the end of round 22, 2026.

Career highlights
- GWS VFL Best & Fairest: 2021; VFL Team of the Year: 2021

James Peatling is an Australian rules footballer who plays for the Adelaide Football Club in the Australian Football League (AFL). He previously played for Greater Western Sydney.

== Early life ==
Peatling grew up in the Sydney suburb of Toongabbie. In his youth, Peatling played junior football for local club Westbrook Bulldogs and later amateur club Pennant Hills in the AFL Sydney Premier Division, and won a premiership for the club alongside future teammate Kieren Briggs. Peatling went through the GWS Giants Academy, and eventually represented the Allies in the AFL Under 18 Championship, playing 36 games and averaging 14 disposals. He played for the Giant's VFL team in the 2021 season, averaging 22 possessions including a 33-disposal game against Port Melbourne. He was a member of the 2021 VFL Team of the Year.

== AFL career ==
=== Greater Western Sydney (2021–2024) ===
After being passed over in two drafts, Peatling was selected by the Giants in the 2021 mid-season draft, becoming the club's first-ever mid-season draft selection. Peatling made his debut against Port Adelaide in round 20 of the 2021 season, collecting 19 disposals to go with 7 marks.

Peatling's true breakout season came in 2024, kicking off when he came on as the substitute for Sam Taylor against St Kilda and took a game-saving mark. Peatling came in clutch again later in the year against Melbourne with a career-best 28 disposals and 11 tackles, one of which came at a critical stage of the game against future teammate Alex Neal-Bullen. Peatling improved upon his career-best tackle number with 12 in the qualifying final loss to Sydney. He finished the year with 18 games, the most thus far in his career. Peatling received four-year offers from Adelaide, Collingwood, Melbourne, St Kilda, West Coast and the Western Bulldogs at the end of his breakthrough season, as well as a four year offer to remain at the Giants. On the third of October, Peatling chose Adelaide and formally requested a trade.

=== Adelaide (2025–present) ===
Peatling officially joined the Adelaide Crows on the final day of the 2024 trade period, joining Giants teammate Isaac Cumming who had made the same move via free agency.

During 2025's Gather Round clash against Geelong, Peatling was charged with a dangerous tackle against Oisín Mullin. The Crows midfielder was suspended for one match, meaning he missed facing his former side Greater Western Sydney the following round. Peatling polled votes in the Showdown Medal against Port Adelaide, during which he had a career-high 12 tackles.

== Statistics ==
Updated to the end of round 22, 2026.

Legend
G	Goals	K	Kicks	D	Disposals	T	Tackles
B	Behinds	H	Handballs	M	Marks

Season	Team	No.	Games	Totals							Averages (per game)							Votes
Season	Team	No.	Games	G	B	K	H	D	M	T	G	B	K	H	D	M	T	Votes
2021	Greater Western Sydney	45	4	0	0	27	15	42	15	6	0.0	0.0	6.8	3.8	10.5	3.8	1.5	0
2022	Greater Western Sydney	20	12	9	8	80	43	123	50	18	0.8	0.7	6.7	3.6	10.3	4.2	1.5	1
2023	Greater Western Sydney	20	10	0	6	64	45	109	26	30	0.0	0.6	6.4	4.5	10.9	2.6	3.0	0
2024	Greater Western Sydney	20	19	7	3	159	103	262	32	97	0.4	0.2	8.4	5.4	13.8	1.7	5.1	1
2025	Adelaide	25	23	12	6	245	184	429	63	94	0.5	0.3	10.7	8.0	18.7	2.7	4.1	1
2026	Adelaide	25	20	4	7	233	170	403	56	93	0.2	0.4	11.7	8.5	20.2	2.8	4.7	0
Career			88	32	30	808	560	1368	242	338	0.4	0.3	9.2	6.4	15.5	2.8	3.8	3
