= Josh Worrell =

Personal information
- Full name: Joshua Worrell
- Nicknames: Woozle, Woz
- Born: 11 April 2001 (age 25); High Wycombe, England
- Original teams: Sandringham Dragons (Talent League); Bentleigh Demons (SMJFL); East Brighton Vampires (SMJFL)
- Draft: No. 28, 2019 national draft
- Debut: Round 13, 2021, Adelaide vs. St Kilda, at Cazaly's Stadium
- Height: 195 cm (6 ft 5 in)
- Weight: 93 kg (205 lb)
- Position: Key defender

Club information
- Current club: Adelaide
- Number: 24

Playing career^{1}
Years	Club	Games (Goals)
2020–	Adelaide	79 (0)
- ^{1} Playing statistics correct to the end of 2026.

Joshua Worrell (born 11 April 2001) is an Australian rules footballer who plays for the Adelaide Football Club in the Australian Football League (AFL).

== Early life ==
Born in High Wycombe, England, Worrell moved to Australia as an infant and grew up in Melbourne, attending first CBC St Kilda (St Mary's College) and then Haileybury. He played his junior football for Bentleigh Demons and East Brighton Vampires and was drafted out of the Sandringham Dragons. In 2019 he represented Vic Metro at the under-18 championships and was the team's top goal-kicker.

== AFL career ==
Worrell, a left-footed player, was selected by Adelaide with the 28th pick of the 2019 national draft. His league debut came in Cairns against St Kilda in 2021. He has since been used by the Crows as a medium defender, rather than his drafted position of forward.

Worrell showed signs of becoming a breakout star defender for the Crows in 2024 until he broke his wrist in a drawn match against Brisbane Lions. In "huge show of faith" by Adelaide, Worrell signed a two-year contract extension in the week following his injury. He returned to the side wearing a wrist support in round 21 against Geelong, and had a strong finish to the season. Worrell averaged a career-best 18 disposals in 2024, ranked "elite".

He started the 2025 season strongly with a career-high 25 disposals against St Kilda. Worrell escaped a ban against Fremantle, receiving a fine for a dangerous tackle against Michael Frederick. Teammate Mitch Hinge received a one-game suspension in the same match, and the following week, Worrell thrived with the additional defensive responsibilities against Carlton. Worrell continued his career-best year and launched himself in All-Australian contention with a personal-best 27 disposals against Collingwood in round 23. He was second in intercept possessions during the 2025 home-and-away season only behind teammate Mark Keane. Prior to the finals series, Worrell re-signed with the Crows, extending his contract until the end of 2033.

In the 2026 elimination final against the Western Bulldogs, Worrell was one of Adelaide's best players on the ground. He collected a career-best 34 disposals and finished with 19 intercept possessions, an AFL finals record.

== Personal life ==
Worrell was the subject of a police investigation in July 2026 after his car struck a pedestrian on Port Road, Adelaide on his way to training. He was later charged for the incident.

== Statistics ==
Updated to the end of round 22, 2026.

Legend
G	Goals	K	Kicks	D	Disposals	T	Tackles
B	Behinds	H	Handballs	M	Marks

Season	Team	No.	Games	Totals							Averages (per game)							Votes
Season	Team	No.	Games	G	B	K	H	D	M	T	G	B	K	H	D	M	T	Votes
2020 (Note: The 2020 season was played with 17 home-and-away matches per team (down from 22) and 16-minute quarters with time on (down from 20-minute quarters with time on) due to the impact of the COVID-19 pandemic.)	Adelaide	24	0	—	—	—	—	—	—	—	—	—	—	—	—	—	—	0
2021	Adelaide	24	1	0	0	2	1	3	0	2	0.0	0.0	2.0	1.0	3.0	0.0	2.0	0
2022	Adelaide	24	4	0	0	33	24	57	8	7	0.0	0.0	8.3	6.0	14.3	2.0	1.8	0
2023	Adelaide	24	12	0	0	127	48	175	47	25	0.0	0.0	10.6	4.0	14.6	3.9	2.1	0
2024	Adelaide	24	13	0	0	155	78	233	67	19	0.0	0.0	11.9	6.0	17.9	5.2	1.5	0
2025	Adelaide	24	25	0	0	365	160	525	144	32	0.0	0.0	14.6	6.4	21.0	5.8	1.3	1
2026	Adelaide	24	20	0	0	283	155	438	115	34	0.0	0.0	14.2	7.8	21.9	5.8	1.7	0
Career			75	0	0	965	466	1431	381	119	0.0	0.0	12.9	6.2	19.1	5.1	1.6	1
