= Grace Kelly (footballer) =

Australian rules footballer

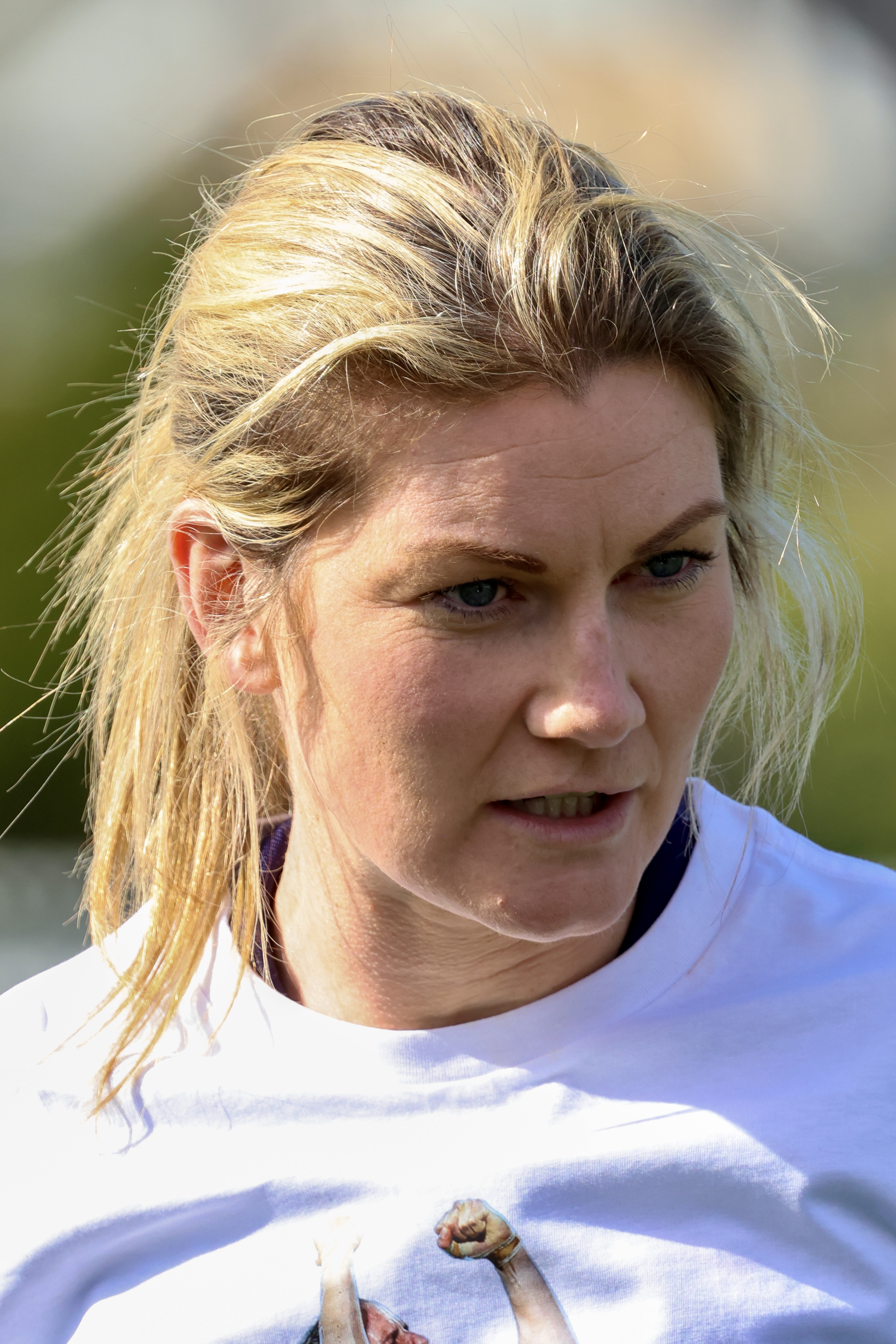
- Kelly with Adelaide in 2026

Personal information
- Full name: Grace Kelly
- Born: 18 April 1994 (age 32)
- Original team: Mayo (GAA)
- Draft: 2019 rookie signing
- Debut: Round 1, 2020, West Coast vs. Collingwood, at Victoria Park
- Height: 176 cm (5 ft 9 in)
- Position: Forward

Club information
- Current club: Adelaide

Playing career^{1}
Years	Club	Games (Goals)
2020–2022^{(S6)}	West Coast	23 (9)
2022^{(S7)}–2024	St Kilda	21 (0)
2025–	Adelaide	13 (7)
Total		57 (16)
- ^{1} Playing statistics correct to the end of 2024.

Career highlights
- West Coast leading goalkicker: 2021

Grace Kelly (born 18 April 1994) is an Australian rules footballer who plays for Adelaide in the AFL Women's (AFLW). She has previously played for West Coast Eagles and St Kilda, She is the sister of Adelaide player Niamh Kelly.

== AFL Women's career ==
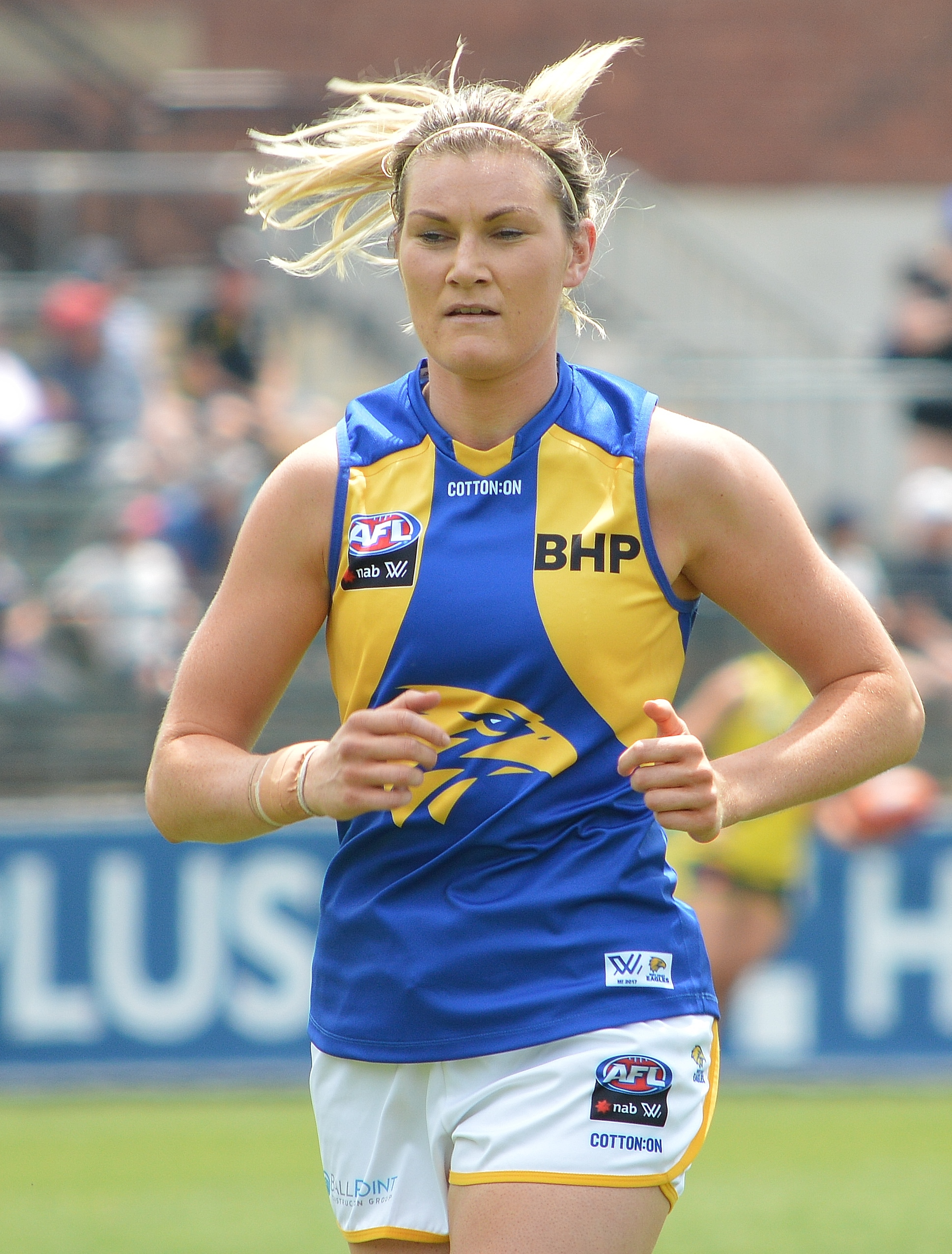
Kelly with West Coast in 2020

In April 2019, Kelly joined West Coast as an international rookie together with her sister Niamh Kelly. She became a part of West Coast's inaugural AFL Women's team when she debuted in round 1, 2020 against Collingwood. After suffering a knee injury against Gold Coast in 2020, Kelly's debut year was cut short. She played as a forward in her earlier years of Australian football, and became West Coast's second leading goalkicker in the AFL Women's in 2021.

In June 2022, Kelly was traded to St Kilda. She missed her first season at the Saints due to an ongoing injury, but returned to play all 21 games across the 2023 and 2024 seasons. Kelly had a career-best game when she played against her sister for the first time at Norwood Oval, recording 21 disposals and five tackles.

Following an unsuccessful 2024 season for St Kilda, Kelly was traded to Adelaide, where she would be reunited with her sister Niamh.

== Personal life ==
Kelly is the sister of Adelaide player Niamh Kelly. The pair grew up in Bohola in County Mayo.
