= Christina Leuzzi =

Australian rules footballer (born 2003)

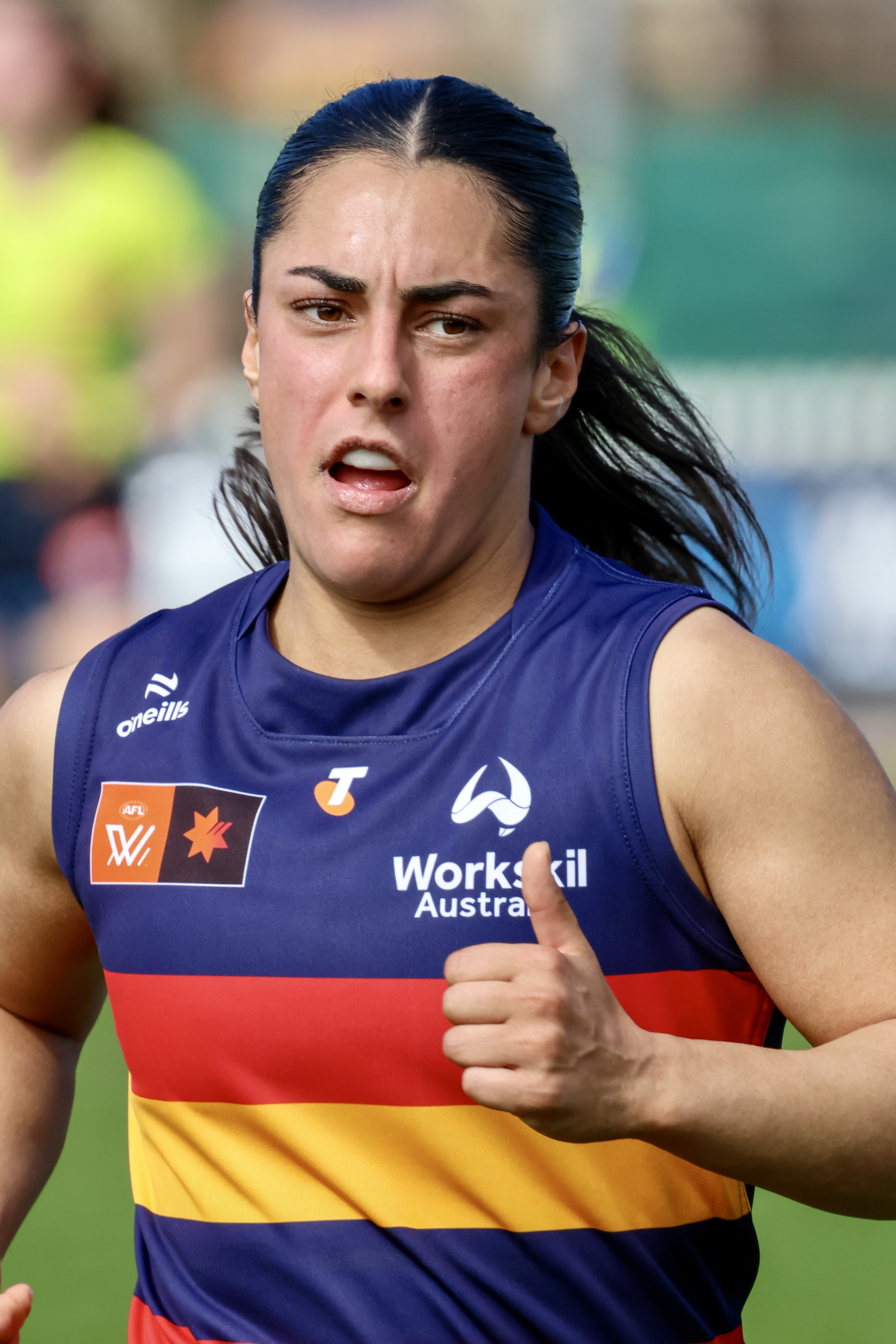
- Leuzzi with Adelaide in August 2026

Personal information
- Born: 7 August 2003 (age 23)
- Original team: Woodville-West Torrens (SANFL)
- Debut: Round 9, 2025, Adelaide vs. West Coast, at Norwood Oval
- Height: 157 cm (5 ft 2 in)
- Position: Midfielder / utility

Club information
- Current club: Adelaide
- Number: 19

Playing career^{1}
Years	Club	Games (Goals)
2025–	Adelaide	1 (0)
- ^{1} Playing statistics correct to the end of 2025.

Christina Leuzzi (born 7 August 2003) is a professional Australian rules football player who currently plays for the Adelaide Crows in the AFL Women's (AFLW).

== Early life ==
Leuzzi played for Woodville-West Torrens in the SANFL Women's. In 2025, Leuzzi averaged 23 disposals, 7.3 clearances and 7.5 tackles across ten games for the Eagles. She was also awarded with the SANFLW's best player afield in the representative State Game match against the VFL Women's. Her outstanding season was rewarded with the captaincy in the SANFLW Team of the Year. She also won the coaches' award at season's end.

She grew up supporting the Adelaide Football Club in the AFL and the AFLW.

== AFL Women's career ==
In June 2025, following a few seasons as a train-on player, Leuzzi was signed by the Adelaide Football Club as a replacement rookie signing for the injured Georgia McKee.

In her debut season, Leuzzi made her AFLW debut in the round nine win against West Coast at Norwood Oval, but she only managed the one senior appearance in the 2025 season. In January 2026, Leuzzi extended her stay at the club, signing a one-year contract to the end of 2026.
