= Sid Draper =

Australian rules footballer (born 2006)

Personal information
- Full name: Sid Draper
- Nicknames: Sid The Kid, Drapes
- Born: 5 July 2006 (age 20); Adelaide, South Australia
- Original teams: South Adelaide (SANFL); Willunga (GSFL)
- Draft: No. 4, 2024 national draft
- Debut: Round 1, 2025, Adelaide vs. St Kilda, at Adelaide Oval
- Height: 182 cm (6 ft 0 in)
- Position: Midfielder

Club information
- Current club: Adelaide
- Number: 5

Playing career^{1}
Years	Club	Games (Goals)
2025–	Adelaide	10 (3)
- ^{1} Playing statistics correct to the end of the 2026 season.

Sid Draper (born 5 July 2006) is an Australian rules footballer who plays for the Adelaide Crows in the Australian Football League (AFL).

== Early life ==
Born and raised in Adelaide, Draper grew up supporting the Adelaide Crows. He previously played in the South Australian National Football League (SANFL) for South Adelaide. At the age of 17, Draper represented South Australia in the AFL U18 Championships, and captained the side during his draft year of 2024. At under 18 level, Draper received All-Australian honours and captained the side to the premiership.

Approaching the 2024 draft, rumours circulated that Draper and his family were opposed to being drafted by the Adelaide Crows due to concerns around the club's "ability to manage younger players". Draper responded to the media, saying he "would be very happy to go to the Crows".

Draper's older brother Arlo was listed with Collingwood between 2022 and 2023, but did not play a senior game.

== AFL career ==
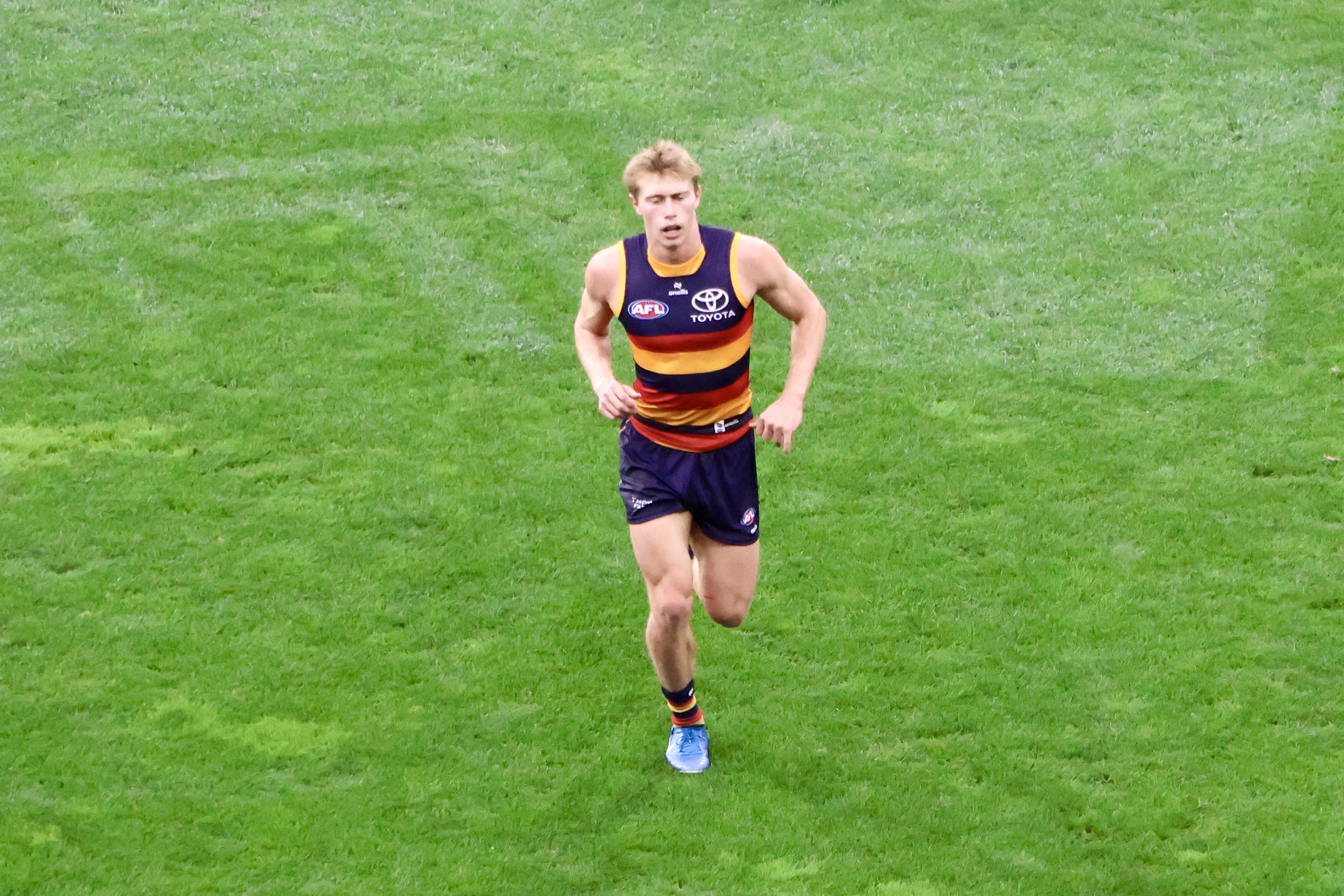
Draper with Adelaide in 2025.

With the 4th overall pick in the 2024 national draft, Draper was selected by the Adelaide Crows, his boyhood club. He impressed early in the pre-season, with Crows star Izak Rankine noting that "he's actually dominated training".

Draper made his debut in round 1 of the 2025 season, replacing veteran forward Taylor Walker as a substitute. Continuing to feature as the medical substitute, Draper kicked his first two goals in round 3 against North Melbourne as he replaced the injured Josh Rachele at quarter-time.

Draper played an extended stint in the Adelaide reserves team in the SANFL in the 2nd half of 2025. He was recalled to the senior team for their round 24 match against North Melbourne, but was omitted for the Qualifying Final against Collingwood, finishing the season on 10 senior games.

In 2026, Draper changed his jumper number from 34 to 5, occupying the locker vacated by former All-Australian Matt Crouch. He experienced an interrupted start to the year, suffering minor injuries during the pre-season and in the first half of the season, and was unable to feature at AFL level in 2026.

== Statistics ==
Updated to the end of the 2026 season.

Legend
G	Goals	K	Kicks	D	Disposals	T	Tackles
B	Behinds	H	Handballs	M	Marks

Season	Team	No.	Games	Totals							Averages (per game)							Votes
Season	Team	No.	Games	G	B	K	H	D	M	T	G	B	K	H	D	M	T	Votes
2025	Adelaide	34	10	3	1	35	37	72	8	24	0.3	0.1	3.5	3.7	7.2	0.8	2.4	0
2026	Adelaide	5	0	—	—	—	—	—	—	—	—	—	—	—	—	—	—	
Career			10	3	1	35	37	72	8	24	0.3	0.1	3.5	3.7	7.2	0.8	2.4	0
