= Faith Lutheran College, Tanunda =

Coordinates: 34.5210°S 138.9838°E

Faith Lutheran College
- Tanunda, South Australia; Australia

Information
- Type: Independent, Lutheran
- Motto: Saved By Grace
- Established: 1985
- Principal: Steven Wilksch
- Enrolment: 680 students
- Campus
- Colours: Green, grey
- Website: http://www.faith.sa.edu.au/

Faith Lutheran College is a co-educational independent secondary school of the Lutheran Church of Australia located on 25 hectares (62 acres) of land on the northeastern side of Tanunda in South Australia.

== History ==
Faith Lutheran school opened on 11 February 1985 with an enrolment of 27 students and three staff on the grounds of St John's Lutheran Church, Tanunda. Faith moved to its current campus in 1986 after the completion of its first nine classrooms. In 2012 the name was changed to Faith Lutheran College by Lutheran Schools Australia.

== Facilities ==
Faith Lutheran College's facilities include:

The Barossa Arts and Convention Centre includes the 970 seat Brenton Langbein Theatre, the intimate 120 seat Eckermann Theatre, the Glassroom Exhibition Space, a boardroom and a dance studio. It is used by the College for a variety of things including dance drama classes, the school's performances, the College's musicals and is the College's chapel for reflection and times of worship.

The Faith Wine Education Centre which includes a small winery and is home to the College's wine label, Mengler View Wines.

It also has a focus on agriculture, farming, music and fund raising.

== Leadership ==
Faith has been led by these principals:

- Brian Eckermann 1985–2006
- Gavan Cramer 2007–2014
- Steven Wilksch 2015–current
