= Niamh Kelly =

Australian rules footballer

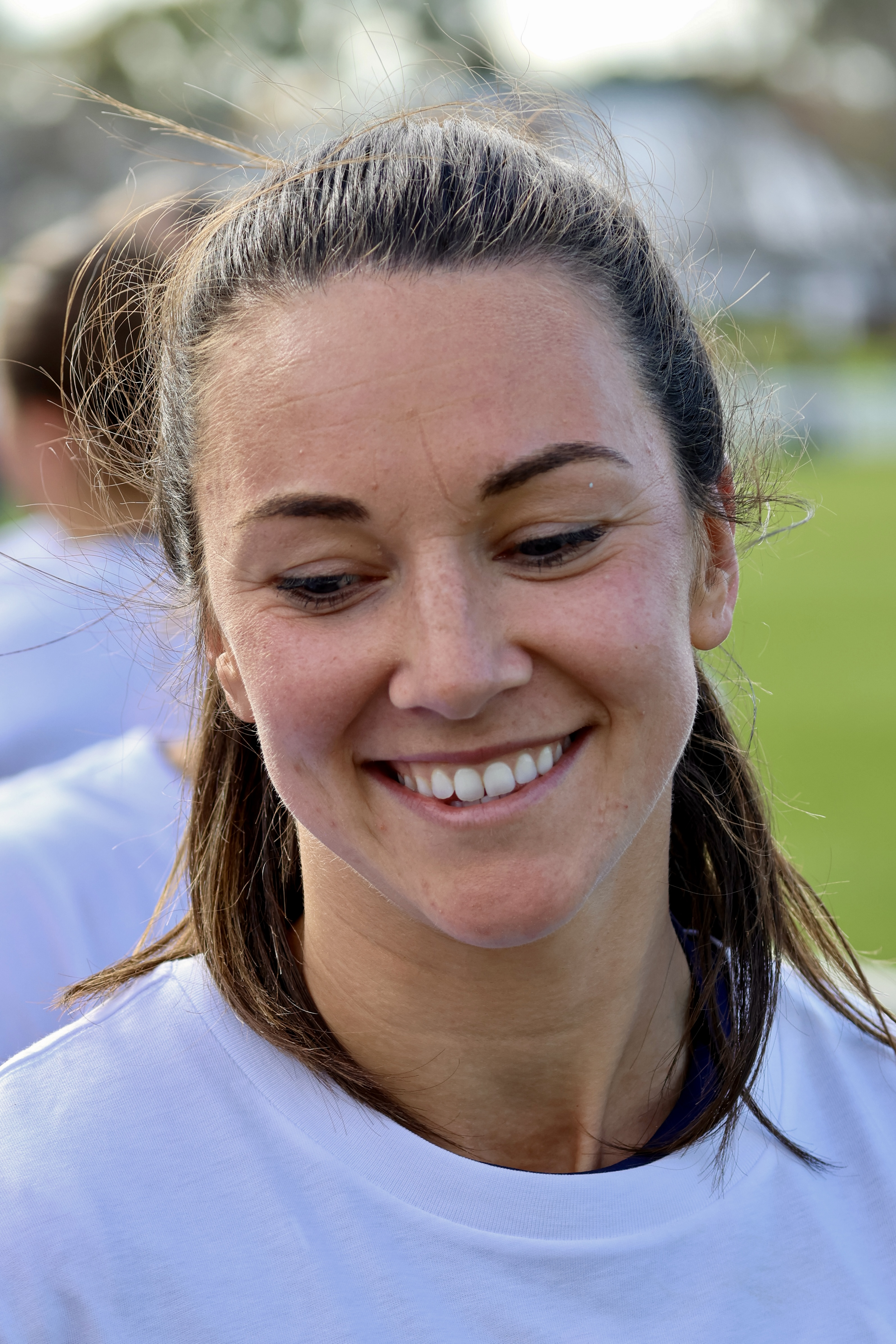
- Kelly with Adelaide in 2026

Personal information
- Full name: Niamh Kelly
- Born: 30 August 1995 (age 31)
- Original team: Mayo (GAA)
- Draft: 2019 rookie signing
- Debut: Round 1, 2020, West Coast vs. Collingwood, at Victoria Park
- Height: 171 cm (5 ft 7 in)
- Position: Midfielder

Club information
- Current club: Adelaide
- Number: 23

Playing career^{1}
Years	Club	Games (Goals)
2020–2022 (S6)	West Coast	22 (5)
2022 (S7)–	Adelaide	35 (11)
Total		57 (16)

International team honours^{2}
Years	Team	Games (Goals)
2026	Ireland	1 (0)
- ^{1} Playing statistics correct to the end of 2024.^{2} Representative statistics correct as of 2026.

Career highlights
- AFL Women's All-Australian team: 2023; Showdown Medal: 2023

Niamh Kelly (born 30 August 1995) is a gaelic football player who plays for Mayo and an Australian rules footballer who plays for Adelaide in the AFL Women's (AFLW). She has previously played for West Coast. She is the sister of Adelaide player Grace Kelly.

== AFL Women's career ==
In June 2019, Kelly joined West Coast as an international rookie, together with her sister Grace. Making her debut in round 1, 2020 against Collingwood, Kelly was a part of West Coast's inaugural AFL Women's team.

In June 2022, both Kelly sisters left the Eagles; Niamh was traded to Adelaide, while Grace departed for St Kilda.

Kelly had a career-best year in 2023. After winning the second-ever Showdown Medal awarded in the AFLW in round one of the season, Kelly recorded a personal-best 28 disposals and 99 AFL Fantasy points in round 8 against Brisbane. The following week, Kelly scored a match-winning goal against an in-form North Melbourne to secure her team a top-two finish and a home qualifying final. Kelly was rewarded for her outstanding form in 2023 with selection in the All Australian squad.

== Personal life ==
Kelly is the sister of Adelaide player Grace Kelly. The pair grew up in Bohola in County Mayo.
