= Isaac Cumming =

Australian rules footballer (born 1998)

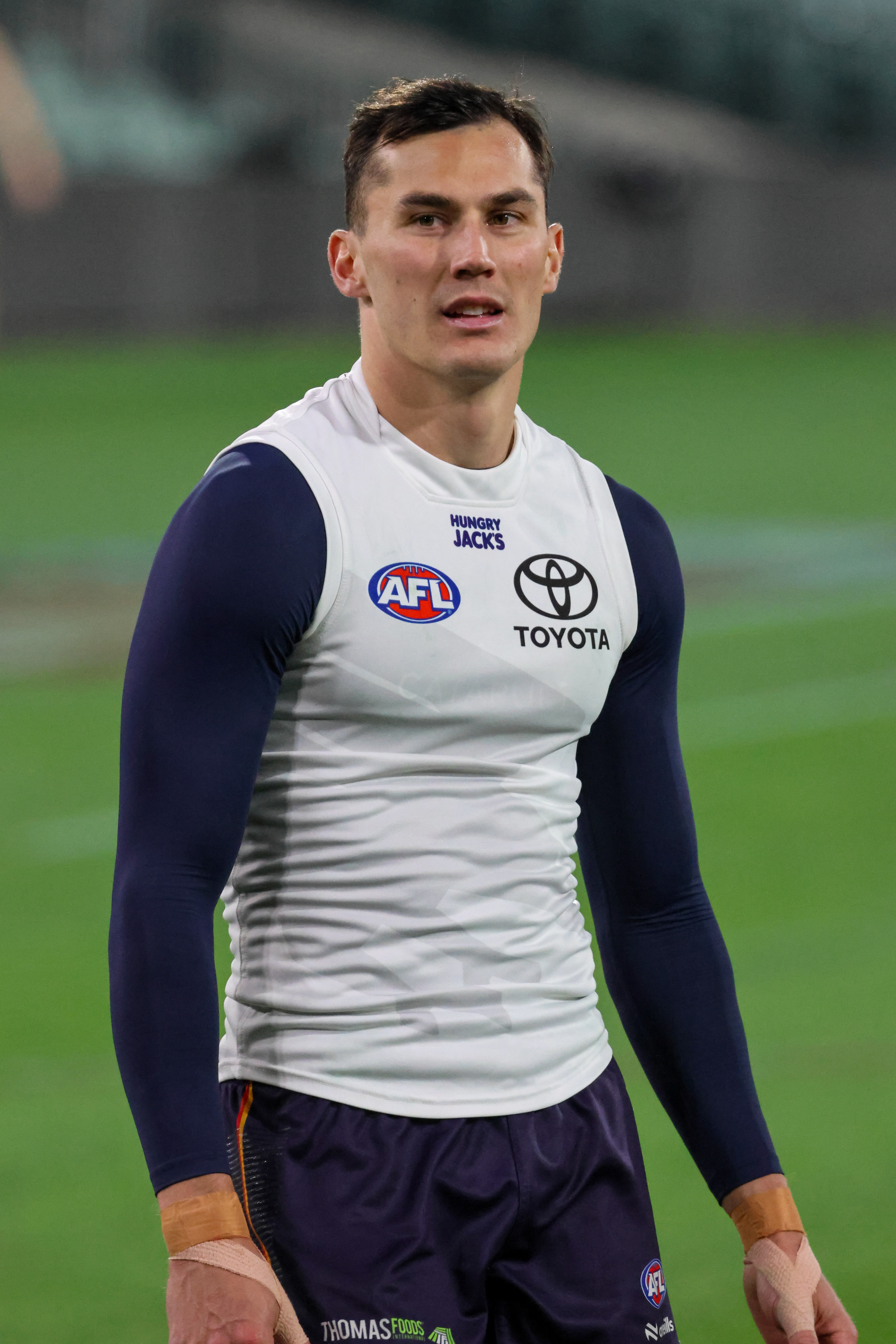
- Cumming in 2026

Personal information
- Full name: Isaac Lawton Cumming
- Nickname: Cheese
- Born: 11 August 1998 (age 28); Broken Hill, New South Wales
- Original teams: North Adelaide (SANFL); GWS Giants (NEAFL); North Broken Hill (Broken Hill)
- Draft: No. 20, 2016 national draft
- Debut: 12 May 2018, Greater Western Sydney vs. West Coast Eagles, at Spotless Stadium
- Height: 188 cm (6 ft 2 in)
- Weight: 80 kg (176 lb)
- Position: Defender/Wing

Club information
- Current club: Adelaide
- Number: 13

Playing career^{1}
Years	Club	Games (Goals)
2017–2024	Greater Western Sydney	81 (10)
2025–	Adelaide	38 (14)
Total		117 (23)
- ^{1} Playing statistics correct to the end of round 22, 2026.

Career highlights
- GWS VFL Best & Fairest: 2017

Isaac Lawton Cumming is a professional Australian rules footballer playing for the Adelaide Football Club in the Australian Football League (AFL). Originally drafted to the Greater Western Sydney Giants in the 2016 national draft, Cumming plays as a defender and made his debut in round 8, 2018 against the West Coast Eagles at Spotless Stadium.

== Early life ==
Originally from Broken Hill, Cumming played junior football Broken Hill before joining the Giants Academy. Isaac played in the 2016 League Premiership for his local club, the North Broken Hill Bulldogs, before being drafted with pick 20 in the 2016 AFL draft later that year. He played in the North East Australian Football League (NEAFL) for the Western Sydney University Giants (the GWS Giants' NEAFL affiliate). He also played for North Adelaide under 18s, as well as for NSW/ACT and the Allies in the National Under 18 Championships.

== AFL career ==
=== Greater Western Sydney ===
In March 2018, Cumming recommitted to GWS until 2020. Wearing the number 13, Cumming played 5 games in 2019, but was omitted from the squad for the club's historic finals series in which they made the grand final. In the 2023 preliminary final against Collingwood, Cumming scored a goal to set up a 10-point lead at half time, but the Giants went on to lose by a solitary point. A pre-season calf injury prevented Cumming from playing early in the 2024 season, but returned later and played 6 games for Greater Western Sydney. Following the Giants' semi-final exit in 2024, Cumming informed the club of his desire to exercise his free agency, seeking a move to South Australia.

=== Adelaide ===
In September 2024, Cumming announced his desire to join the Adelaide Football Club during the free agency period, citing fellow Broken Hill native Taylor Walker as a key influence behind the decision. Cumming officially signed with the Crows on 4 October. He made his club debut in round 1 of 2025 against St Kilda, and later that year played his 100th AFL game in the win over Hawthorn.

Prior to the 2026 season, Cumming was added to Adelaide's leadership group, which included six other leaders. He overcame a hamstring injury in the preseason to play in the round one win against Collingwood, kicking two goals at the MCG. Later in the season, he was omitted from Adelaide's squad for the semi-final against Brisbane Lions. Cumming swapped his guernsey number from 44 to 13 following Walker's retirement.

== Personal life ==
Cumming is engaged to his partner Mia. In July 2025, the couple announced that they are expecting a baby, due January 2026. Elsie Cumming was born on the 19th of January, 2026.

== Statistics ==
Updated to the end of round 22, 2026.

Legend
G	Goals	K	Kicks	D	Disposals	T	Tackles
B	Behinds	H	Handballs	M	Marks

Season	Team	No.	Games	Totals							Averages (per game)							Votes
Season	Team	No.	Games	G	B	K	H	D	M	T	G	B	K	H	D	M	T	Votes
2017	Greater Western Sydney	13	0	—	—	—	—	—	—	—	—	—	—	—	—	—	—	0
2018	Greater Western Sydney	13	2	0	0	9	13	22	4	3	0.0	0.0	4.5	6.5	11.0	2.0	1.5	0
2019	Greater Western Sydney	13	5	0	0	35	25	60	15	13	0.0	0.0	7.0	5.0	12.0	3.0	2.6	0
2020 (Note: The 2020 season was played with 17 home-and-away matches per team (down from 22) and 16-minute quarters with time on (down from 20-minute quarters with time on) due to the impact of the COVID-19 pandemic.)	Greater Western Sydney	13	3	0	0	21	14	35	11	5	0.0	0.0	7.0	4.7	11.7	3.7	1.7	0
2021	Greater Western Sydney	13	24	1	4	372	153	525	131	55	0.0	0.2	15.5	6.4	21.9	5.5	2.3	2
2022	Greater Western Sydney	13	21	0	2	378	116	494	122	50	0.0	0.1	18.0	5.5	23.5	5.8	2.4	1
2023	Greater Western Sydney	13	20	6	0	231	103	334	83	49	0.3	0.0	11.6	5.2	16.7	4.2	2.5	0
2024	Greater Western Sydney	13	6	3	1	46	38	84	24	25	0.5	0.2	7.7	6.3	14.0	4.0	4.2	0
2025	Adelaide	44	24	7	3	241	110	351	101	48	0.3	0.1	10.0	4.6	14.6	4.2	2.0	0
2026	Adelaide	44	14	7	0	126	81	207	58	37	0.5	0.0	9.0	5.8	14.8	4.1	2.6	0
Career			119	24	10	1459	653	2112	549	285	0.2	0.1	12.3	5.5	17.7	4.6	2.4	3
