= Mark Keane (footballer) =

Australian rules football player

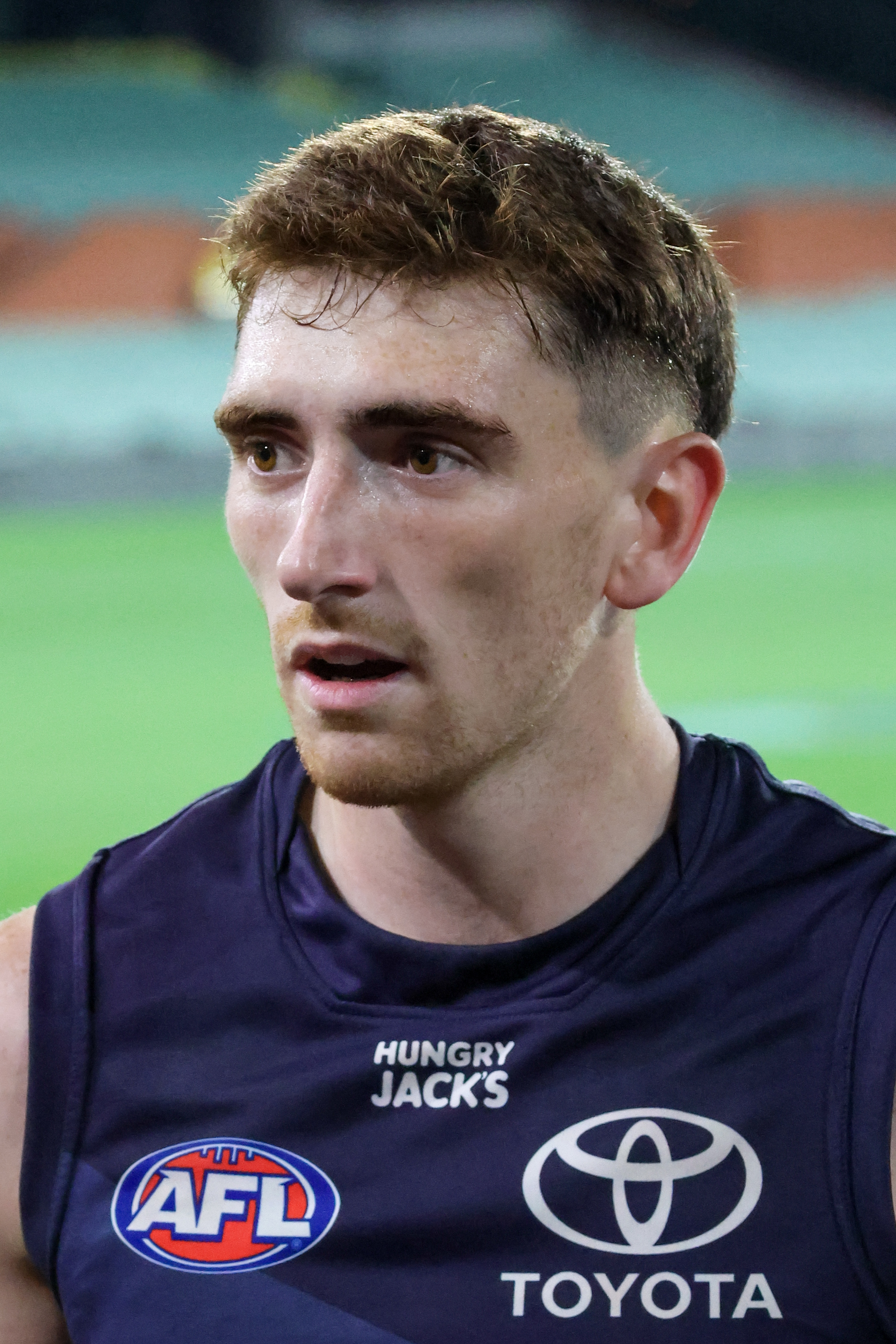
- Keane with Adelaide in 2026

Personal information
- Born: 17 March 2000 (age 26)
- Original teams: Cork GAA, Ballygiblin GAA, Mitchelstown GAA
- Draft: 2019 category B rookie selection
- Debut: Round 9, 2020, Collingwood vs. Fremantle, at Perth Stadium
- Height: 194 cm (6 ft 4 in)
- Weight: 92 kg (203 lb)
- Position: Defender

Club information
- Current club: Adelaide
- Number: 48

Playing career^{1}
Years	Club	Games (Goals)
2019–2021	Collingwood	5 (0)
2023–	Adelaide	62 (0)
Total		67 (0)
- ^{1} Playing statistics correct to the end of 2026.

Mark Keane (born 17 March 2000) is an Irish professional Australian rules footballer who plays for the Adelaide Football Club after previously playing for the Collingwood Football Club in the Australian Football League (AFL).

== Early life and junior sports ==
Keane grew up in Mitchelstown in County Cork, Ireland. He played hurling and Gaelic football in Cork and represented Cork at U20 level in football. Keane was scouted by an Australian Football League recruiter while playing for North Cork in 2017 and tested at the 2017 AFL European Combine in Dublin where he was offered a contract with the Collingwood Football Club.

== AFL career ==
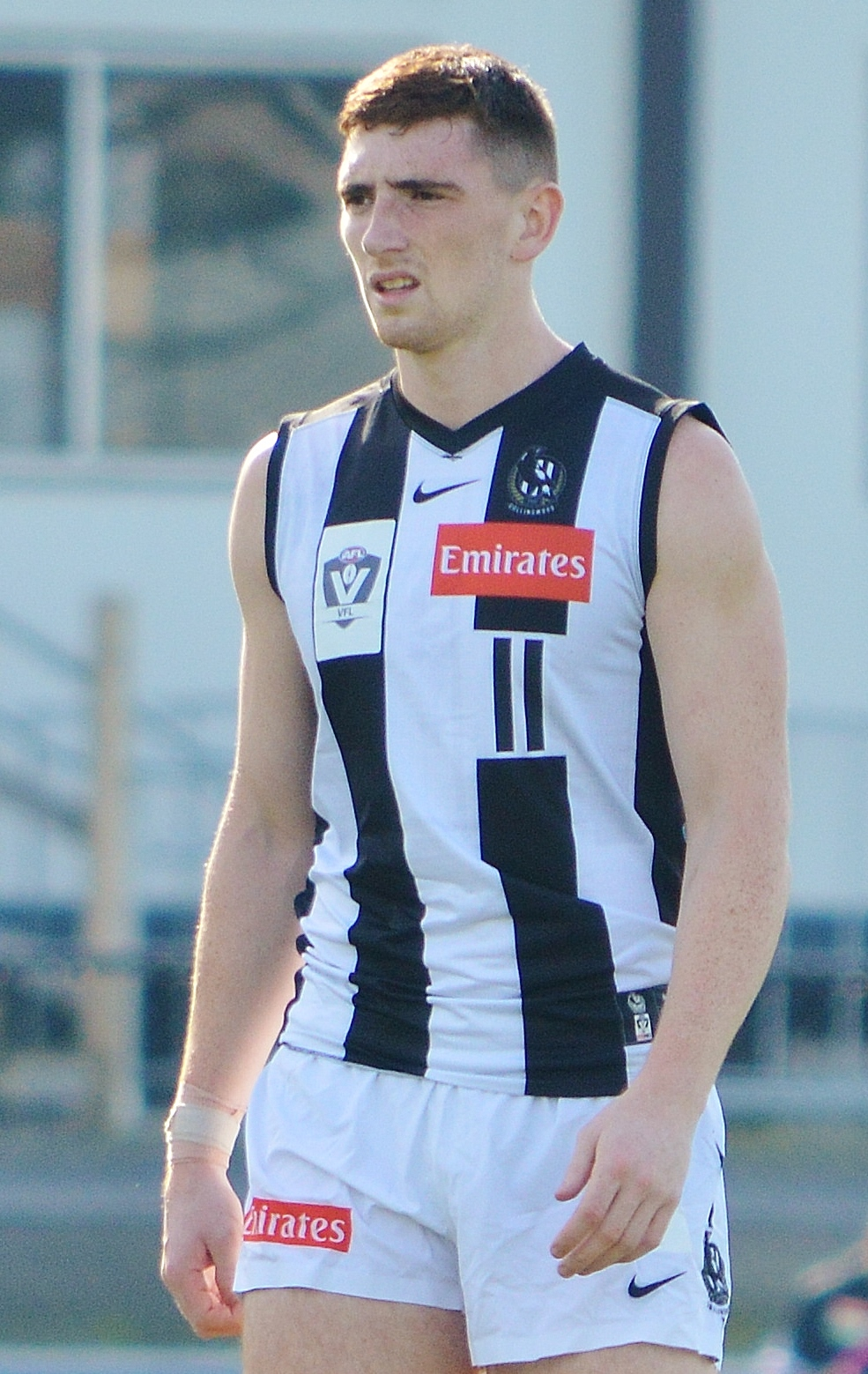
Keane with Collingwood's VFL side in July 2021

=== Collingwood ===
Keane joined Collingwood as a Category B rookie in 2018 after a two-week trial at the club. He made his debut in the club's round 9 match in the 2020 AFL season against Fremantle, where the Magpies lost by 12 points. In January 2022, Keane left Collingwood and the AFL to play Gaelic Football with Mitchelstown GAA in Ireland.

=== Adelaide Crows ===
Ultimately, Keane returned to Australia and signed with Adelaide in the 2023 pre-season supplemental signing period (SPP). He made his debut with the Adelaide Crows in Round 20 in 2023 with a Showdown win against Port Adelaide. Keane had a break-out year in 2024, headlined by a dominant defensive performance where he had 26 disposals and 11 marks in the Crows' loss to Fremantle. Keane missed only two games for the season, and despite rumours that he would request a trade to return to Collingwood, Keane re-committed to Adelaide beyond his contracted year of 2025, extending until 2028.

Keane missed the first half of the 2026 season after a horror lower leg injury while training. He made his return to competitive football in the Crows' reserves match against South Adelaide.

== GAA career ==
Keane returned to Ireland in 2020 and was brought on as a substitute for Cork against Kerry in the 2020 Munster Senior Football Championship. He scored the late goal that knocked Kerry out of the competition, in what was described as "one of the biggest upsets in recent championship history... a strike so late it had eerie echoes of Tadhg Murphy's 1983 goal at the same end of the ground that similarly put Kerry out of the championship".

== Statistics ==
Updated to the end of round 22, 2026.

Legend
G	Goals	K	Kicks	D	Disposals	T	Tackles
B	Behinds	H	Handballs	M	Marks

Season	Team	No.	Games	Totals							Averages (per game)							Votes
Season	Team	No.	Games	G	B	K	H	D	M	T	G	B	K	H	D	M	T	Votes
2020 (Note: The 2020 season was played with 17 home-and-away matches per team (down from 22) and 16-minute quarters with time on (down from 20-minute quarters with time on) due to the impact of the COVID-19 pandemic.)	Collingwood	47	1	0	0	5	2	7	1	2	0.0	0.0	5.0	2.0	7.0	1.0	2.0	0
2021	Collingwood	11	4	0	1	31	25	56	23	1	0.0	0.3	7.8	6.3	14.0	5.8	0.3	0
2023	Adelaide	48	5	0	0	46	21	67	29	3	0.0	0.0	9.2	4.2	13.4	5.8	0.6	0
2024	Adelaide	48	21	0	1	270	83	353	113	22	0.0	0.0	12.9	4.0	16.8	5.4	1.0	0
2025	Adelaide	48	25	0	0	295	75	370	113	28	0.0	0.0	11.8	3.0	14.8	4.5	1.1	1
2026	Adelaide	48	7	0	0	75	32	107	32	7	0.0	0.0	10.7	4.6	15.3	4.6	1.0	0
Career			63	0	2	722	238	960	311	63	0.0	0.0	11.5	3.8	15.2	4.9	1.0	1
