= Jack Madgen =

Australian rules footballer (born 1993)

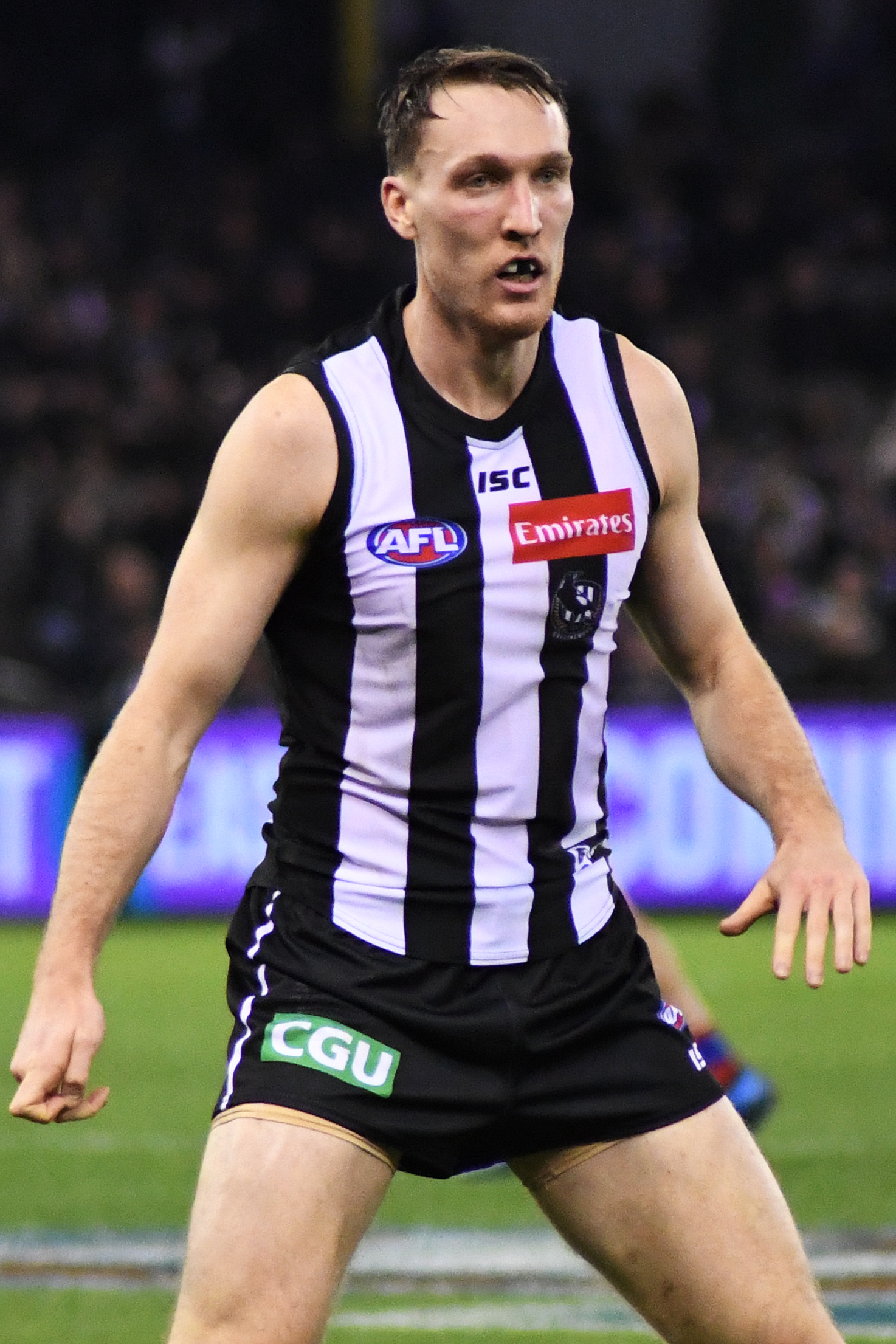
- Madgen playing for Collingwood in August 2018

Personal information
- Born: 25 April 1993 (age 33)
- Original team: Collingwood
- Debut: 4 August 2018, Collingwood vs. Sydney, at the SCG
- Height: 192 cm (6 ft 4 in)
- Weight: 92 kg (203 lb)
- Position: Defender

Playing career^{1}
Years	Club	Games (Goals)
2018–2022	Collingwood	49 (2)
- ^{1} Playing statistics correct to the end of the 2022 season.

Jack Madgen (born 25 April 1993) is a former professional Australian rules footballer who played for Collingwood in the Australian Football League (AFL). He previously played professional basketball for the Cairns Taipans in the National Basketball League (NBL) and U.S. college basketball for Delta State University in Mississippi.

== Early life ==
Madgen is originally from Williamstown, South Australia and played football for Barossa District in 2010 in the Barossa Light & Gawler Football Association. He jointly won the 2010 Senior Colt Footballer of the Year.

== Basketball career ==
Madgen went to Delta State University in Cleveland, Mississippi for four years and played college basketball as a shooting guard. He returned to Australia and played in the National Basketball League with the Cairns Taipans in the 2016–17 season. In 2017, Madgen played for the Mount Gambier Pioneers in the South East Australian Basketball League.

== AFL career ==
In November 2017, he was recruited as a Category B rookie by Collingwood, and played as a half-back in the inaugural 2018 AFLX tournament. In 2018, Madgen broke his jaw in the Victorian Football League (VFL). He returned and was upgraded to the senior list in place of the injured Lynden Dunn. Collingwood coach Nathan Buckley confirmed Madgen would debut against the Sydney Swans in round 20, replacing Jeremy Howe. Prior to the announcement, Madgen had averaged 15 disposals and five marks from 11 VFL games. On debut, Madgen played well in the first half, but was challenged when he played on Sydney forward Lance Franklin. After the 2020 AFL season, Madgen signed a three-year contract extension and was promoted to the senior list. In October 2022, following the trade period, Madgen was delisted by Collingwood.

In December 2022, Madgen was signed as a marquee signing for Adelaide's SANFL team.

== Personal life ==
Madgen is the son of Gene and Deb Madgen. He has three siblings: Ben and Tess, both professional basketball players, and Carly. Madgen's uncle Matt Rendell played for Fitzroy and the Brisbane Bears.

== Statistics ==
Updated to the end of the 2022 season.

Legend
G	Goals	K	Kicks	D	Disposals	T	Tackles
B	Behinds	H	Handballs	M	Marks

Season	Team	No.	Games	Totals							Averages (per game)						
Season	Team	No.	Games	G	B	K	H	D	M	T	G	B	K	H	D	M	T
2018	Collingwood	44	4	0	0	27	33	60	11	6	0.0	0.0	6.8	8.3	15.0	2.8	1.5
2019	Collingwood	44	4	0	0	24	19	43	15	7	0.0	0.0	6.0	4.8	10.8	3.8	1.8
2020 (Note: The 2020 season was played with 17 home-and-away matches per team (down from 22) and 16-minute quarters with time on (down from 20-minute quarters with time on) due to the impact of the COVID-19 pandemic.)	Collingwood	44	13	0	0	85	70	155	46	22	0.0	0.0	6.5	5.4	11.9	3.5	1.7
2021	Collingwood	44	19	1	2	159	145	304	88	19	0.1	0.1	8.4	7.6	16.0	4.6	1.0
2022	Collingwood	44	9	1	0	43	41	84	22	13	0.1	0.0	4.8	4.6	9.3	2.4	1.4
Career			49	2	2	338	308	646	182	67	0.0	0.0	6.9	6.3	13.2	3.7	1.4
