= Fellowes =

Fellowes is a surname, and may refer to:

- Ailwyn Fellowes, 1st Baron Ailwyn (1855–1924), British businessman, farmer and politician
- Ailwyn Fellowes, 3rd Baron de Ramsey (1910–1993), British peer and Territorial soldier
- A. Fellowes-Gordon (1883–1940), British tea planter and politician in colonial Ceylon
- Billy Fellowes (1910–1987), English footballer
- Carol Fellowes, 4th Baron Ailwyn (1896–1988), British peer
- Charles Fellowes (1823–1886), Royal Navy officer
- Coulson Fellowes (1696–1769), English landowner and politician
- Daisy Fellowes (1890–1962), French socialite
- Dorothy Fellowes-Gordon (1891–1991), British heiress and singer
- Edmund Fellowes (E. H. Fellowes) (1870–1951), English musicologist and cleric
- Edward Fellowes (cricketer) (1845–1896), English cleric and cricketer
- Edward Fellowes (parliamentary official) (1895–1970), British Army officer and Clerk of the House of Commons
- Edward Fellowes, 1st Baron de Ramsey (1809–1887), British politician and peer
- Eric Fellowes, 3rd Baron Ailwyn (1887–1976), British peer
- G. B. Lyon-Fellowes (1815–1876), Mayor of Ottawa (1876)
- Graeme Fellowes (1934–2013), Australian rules footballer
- Henry Arthur Wallop Fellowes (1799–1847), English politician
- James Fellowes (artist) (fl.1710–1730), British portrait painter
- James Fellowes (cricketer) (1841–1916), English army officer, cricketer and cricket administrator
- James Fellowes (lord lieutenant) (1849–1935), English lord lieutenant
- James Fellowes (physician) (1771–1857), English military physician
- Lady Jane Fellowes (born 1957), older sister of Diana, Princess of Wales
- Jessica Fellowes (born 1974), English author and journalist
- John Heaphy Fellowes (1932–2010), U.S. Navy captain, pilot and prisoner of war
- Sir John Fellowes, 1st Baronet (bapt.1670–1724), English merchant
- John Fellowes, 4th Baron de Ramsey (born 1942), British landowner and agriculturalist
- Julian Fellowes (born 1949), English actor, novelist and screenwriter
- Matt Fellowes (born 1975), American financial technology entrepreneur
- Newton Fellowes, 4th Earl of Portsmouth (1772–1854), English politician and peer
- Robert Fellowes, Baron Fellowes (born 1941), Private Secretary to Queen Elizabeth II
- Robert Fellowes (philanthropist) (1771–1847), English cleric, journalist and philanthropist
- Robert Fellowes (politician) (1742–1829), English politician
- Rockliffe Fellowes (1884–1950), Canadian actor
- Ronald Fellowes, 2nd Baron Ailwyn (1886–1936), British peer
- Thomas Fellowes (Royal Navy officer, born 1778) (1778–1853), Royal Navy officer during the Napoleonic Wars
- Thomas Fellowes (Royal Navy officer, born 1827) (1827–1923), Royal Navy officer
- Wes Fellowes (born 1961), Australian rules footballer
- William Fellowes of Shotesham Park (1706–1775), English landowner
- William Fellowes (barrister) (1660–1724), English Master in Chancery
- William Fellowes (MP, died 1804) (c.1726–1804), English politician
- William Henry Fellowes (1769–1837), British politician
- William Fellowes, 2nd Baron de Ramsey (1848–1925), British politician

Fellowes may also refer to:

- Fellowes Brands, manufacturer of office equipment

== See also ==
- Fellows (disambiguation)
- Fellows (surname)
