= John Fellowes =

John Fellowes may refer to:

- John Fellowes, 4th Baron de Ramsey (born 1942), British landowner and agriculturalist
- John Heaphy Fellowes (1932–2010), U.S. Navy captain, pilot, and prisoner of war during the Vietnam War

== See also ==
- John Fellows (disambiguation)
- Fellowes
