= Ramsey (constituency) =

Parliamentary constituency in the United Kingdom, 1885–1918

- Former county constituency for the House of Commons

1885–1918
- Seats: one
- Created from: Huntingdonshire
- Replaced by: Huntingdonshire

Ramsey was a parliamentary constituency in Huntingdonshire, which elected one Member of Parliament (MP) to the House of Commons of the Parliament of the United Kingdom. It was also known as North Huntingdonshire.

== History ==
The constituency was created as the Northern or Ramsey Division upon the abolition of the two member Huntingdonshire constituency under the Redistribution of Seats Act 1885. It was one of two county divisions of Huntingdonshire (the other being the Southern or Huntingdon Division). It was abolished under the Representation of the People Act 1918 when it was re-combined with Huntingdon and Huntingdonshire was re-established as a single member constituency.

The division was a predominantly rural area. In addition it included some suburbs of Peterborough and the small towns of Ramsey and St. Ives, as well as part of the Fens.

The Liberal strength in the constituency came from the freeholders of Peterborough (who could vote in Ramsey), the working class Peterborough suburban vote and the smallholders of the Fens. However the area was mostly Conservative, with the rural population under the influence of the largest local landowner Lord de Ramsey. Except for the 1906 general election the Conservative Party won every election in the constituency.

In the 1885 general election one of the former Conservative MPs for the undivided county of Huntingdonshire, William Fellowes was elected the first member from the division. In July 1887 his father, Edward Fellowes, was created the 1st Lord de Ramsey - shortly before his death on 9 August 1887. William Fellowes was thereby elevated to the peerage and vacated his seat in the House of Commons.

The Fellowes family continued to dominate the representation of the division. A younger son of the 1st Baron, the Honourable Ailwyn Fellowes was elected to replace his brother. Fellowes retained the seat until he was defeated in the Liberal landslide in the 1906 general election.

The Liberal MP elected in 1906, Alexander Boulton, was a Canadian lawyer (who later in his career helped found the English-Speaking Union). He was not able to secure re-election in either of the 1910 elections. He was defeated by the fourth and last MP for the constituency, the Conservative Oliver Locker-Lampson.

During the First World War Locker-Lampson served with the R.N.A.S. Armoured Car Unit and also represented the Ministry of Information in various countries. He was involved in France, Belgium, Russia, Romania, Turkey and Persia between 1914 and 1919. He received the Orders of Leopold of Belgium and St Vladimir of Russia amongst other decorations.

== Boundaries ==
The Sessional Divisions of Hurstingstone, Norman Cross, and Ramsey.

== Members of Parliament ==
Election	Member	Party
Huntingdonshire prior to 1885
1885	Hon. William Fellowes	Conservative
1887 by-election	Rt Hon. Ailwyn Fellowes	Conservative
1906	Alexander Boulton	Liberal
1910 (January)	Oliver Locker-Lampson	Conservative
1918	constituency abolished, Huntingdonshire from 1918	

== Election results ==
=== Elections in the 1880s ===
General election 1885: Ramsey
Party	Candidate	Votes	%	±%
Conservative	William Fellowes	2,775	53.5	
Liberal	Esme Gordon	2,410	46.5	
Majority		365	7.0	
Turnout		5,185	86.6	
Registered electors		5,989		
Conservative win (new seat)				

General election 1886: Ramsey
Party	Candidate	Votes	%	±%
Conservative	William Fellowes	Unopposed		
Conservative hold				

Fellowes was elevated to the peerage, becoming Lord De Ramsey, causing a by-election.

By-election, 30 Aug 1887: Ramsey
Party	Candidate	Votes	%	±%
Conservative	Ailwyn Fellowes	2,700	52.8	N/A
Liberal	James Harris Sanders	2,414	47.2	New
Majority		286	5.6	N/A
Turnout		5,114	84.4	N/A
Registered electors		6,057		
Conservative hold		Swing	N/A	

=== Elections in the 1890s ===
General election 1892: Ramsey
Party	Candidate	Votes	%	±%
Conservative	Ailwyn Fellowes	2,842	53.8	N/A
Liberal	John Prince Sheldon	2,445	46.2	N/A
Majority		397	7.6	N/A
Turnout		5,287	80.8	N/A
Registered electors		6,545		
Conservative hold		Swing	N/A	

General election 1895: Ramsey
Party	Candidate	Votes	%	±%
Conservative	Ailwyn Fellowes	3,012	59.3	+5.5
Liberal	Harry Heldmann	2,063	40.7	−5.5
Majority		949	18.6	+11.0
Turnout		5,075	76.5	−4.3
Registered electors		6,630		
Conservative hold		Swing	+5.5	

=== Elections in the 1900s ===
General election 1900: Ramsey
Party	Candidate	Votes	%	±%
Conservative	Ailwyn Fellowes	2,893	62.4	+3.1
Liberal	G J Phillips	1,742	37.6	−3.1
Majority		1,151	24.8	+6.2
Turnout		4,635	69.4	−7.1
Registered electors		6,683		
Conservative hold		Swing	+3.1	

General election 1906: Ramsey
Party	Candidate	Votes	%	±%
Liberal	Alexander Boulton	3,184	53.2	+15.6
Conservative	Ailwyn Fellowes	2,803	46.8	−15.6
Majority		381	6.4	N/A
Turnout		5,987	88.7	+19.3
Registered electors		6,751		
Liberal gain from Conservative		Swing	+15.6	

=== Elections in the 1910s ===
General election January 1910: Ramsey
Party	Candidate	Votes	%	±%
Conservative	Oliver Locker-Lampson	3,350	53.5	+6.7
Liberal	Alexander Boulton	2,915	46.5	−6.7
Majority		435	7.0	N/A
Turnout		6,265	89.1	+0.4
Conservative gain from Liberal		Swing	+6.7	

General election December 1910: Ramsey
Party	Candidate	Votes	%	±%
Conservative	Oliver Locker-Lampson	3,072	51.0	−2.5
Liberal	Alexander Boulton	2,954	49.0	+2.5
Majority		118	2.0	−5.0
Turnout		6,026	85.7	−3.4
Conservative hold		Swing	−3.5	

== See also ==
- Parliamentary representation from Huntingdonshire
- List of former United Kingdom Parliament constituencies

== Sources ==
- Boundaries of Parliamentary Constituencies 1885-1972, compiled and edited by F.W.S. Craig (Parliamentary Reference Publications 1972)
- Social Geography of British Elections 1885-1910. by Henry Pelling (Macmillan 1967)
- Who's Who of British Members of Parliament: Volume I 1832-1885, edited by M. Stenton (The Harvester Press 1976)
- Who's Who of British Members of Parliament, Volume II 1886-1918, edited by M. Stenton and S. Lees (Harvester Press 1978)
- Who's Who of British Members of Parliament, Volume III 1919-1945, edited by M. Stenton and S. Lees (Harvester Press 1979)
