= 1887 Ramsey by-election =

UK parliamentary by-election

The 1887 Ramsey by-election was held on 30 August 1887. The by-election triggered upon succession of William Fellowes to the peerage as Baron de Ramsey. The seat was retained by the Conservative candidate Ailwyn Edward Fellowes.

Ramsey by-election, 1887
Party	Candidate	Votes	%	±%
Conservative	Ailwyn Edward Fellowes	2,700	52.8	N/A
Liberal	James Harris Sanders	2,414	47.2	New
Majority		286	5.6	N/A
Turnout		5,114	84.4	N/A
Conservative hold		Swing	N/A	
