= Chris Gilmour =

British sculptor based in Manchester. (born 1973)

- Born: 1973 (age 52–53); Stockport, England
- Known for: Sculpture
- Awards: Premio Cairo, Premio Michetti
- Website: www.chrisgilmour.com

Chris Gilmour (born 1973) is a British sculptor based in Manchester. Gilmour is known for his sculptures that use cardboard to recreate everyday objects in life-size scale.

== Personal life ==
Born in Stockport in England in 1973, Gilmour received his BA from the University of the West of England in Bristol in 1997, and studied at South Trafford College in Manchester. In 1997 he moved to Udine, Italy, where he lived until he returned to Manchester in 2016. He lives in Manchester.

== Work ==
Gilmour is known for his sculptures made from recycled materials and cardboard. He has created hyper-realistic sculptures that mimic the form of cars, bicycles, a wheelchair, an Aston Martin, public monuments, a typewriter and a piano, among others, all from recycled cardboard and in full scale. Referencing the recycled materials normally used in his work, Gilmour has said: "The use of these found materials is a way of reappropriating or taking control of the things around us, which if you live in a city are pretty much all man-made."

Gilmour has exhibited extensively in Europe and America, including shows at the Museum of Arts and Design (NY) and the Museum of Contemporary Art in Lyon. Gilmour also regularly leads workshops and training events, promoting the use of cardboard as an artistic medium.

== Awards ==
In 2006 Gilmour was awarded the 7th edition of Premio Cairo, a prize for young artists in Milan. In 2012, he received the Premio Michetti award.

In 2022 Vectar Sets won the Ashden Award in the 'Greening All Work' category for promoting ecological solutions to set-building in film and TV.

== Collections ==
Gilmour's 2009 work is held in numerous collections, including the Yale Center for British Art and the Dikeou Collection in Denver.

== Advertising ==
In 2013 Gilmour created forty-foot wide scaled-down replicas of the city of London, Paris and Berlin using the product known as Bankers Boxes, in collaboration with the manufacturer Fellowes. This was followed by a much larger cardboard London set for Vidal Sasson's 'London Luxe' campaign

Gilmour also created all the cardboard props for the 2017-2018 UK Post Office Christmas campaign "It's Never Just Post", which included press adverts and three stop-motion animations.

== Sustainability and Vectar Sets ==
In 2019 Gilmour was involved in the launch of Vectar Project, a studio dedicated to sustainable, carbon-neutral filming based in south Manchester founded and directed by Tom Henderson. Seeing the waste produced by filming while working at the studio, as well as starting a PhD in sustainable design at Lancaster University, led to research into paper-based scenery for film and TV. This research has brought together Gilmour's knowledge of cardboard and design skills with modern industrial technology and innovative paper products.

After a year of research and testing, in 2022 Vectar Sets was officially launched by Tom Henderson and Chris Gilmour to provide paper-based sets and props for film, TV and theatre. Vectar Sets uses a proprietary engineered paper board which offers strength similar to conventional wooden sets, but with much lower weigh. The sets can be printed or finished in traditional materials to create the same realistic look of traditional sets, but are fully recyclable and have a much lower carbon impact. The light weight, ease of use and speedy manufacturing all help reduce costs for productions, as well as helping to reduce the environmental impact and waste caused by film and TV.

Gilmour is now Chief Creative Director at Vectar Sets, in partnership with Tom Henderson, and Head of Sustainability at Vectar Project.

Vectar sets has been involved in numerous productions since its launch, including adverts for Old Spice, Simplisafe, Braun and Meta, and TV programs including Channel 4's 'Drawers Off' and BBC 3's 'Rap Game'.

Vectar Sets won the 2022 Ashden Award for sustainability 'Greening All recognising their commitment to sustainability and reducing the environmental impact of filming.
