= John Fellows =

John Fellows may refer to:

- John R. Fellows, American lawyer and politician
- John Fellows (cricketer), English cricketer
- John Fellows (brigadier general), see Order of battle of the Battle of Long Island
- John Fellows (Continental Army officer), see Landing at Kip's Bay
- John Fellows (horse trainer) in Canadian International Stakes
- Sir John Fellowes, 1st Baronet or Fellows (c. 1671–1724), English merchant and company director

== See also ==
- John Fellows Akers, businessman
- John Fellowes (disambiguation)
- Fellows (disambiguation)
