= Lord Ramsey =

Lord Ramsey may refer to:

- Michael Ramsey, Baron Ramsey of Canterbury (1904–1988), Archbishop of Canterbury from 1961 to 1974

== See also ==
- Jane Ramsey, Baroness Ramsey of Wall Heath, British adviser and Labour politician
- Baron de Ramsey, a hereditary peerage created in 1887
- Lord Ramsay (disambiguation)
- Baron Romsey, a subsidiary title of Earl Mountbatten of Burma
