= Lord Ramsay =

Lord Ramsay may refer to:

- Baron Ramsay, a subsidiary title of the Earl of Dalhousie

== See also ==
- Clan Ramsay, a Scottish Lowland clan
- Meta Ramsay, Baroness Ramsay of Cartvale (born 1936), British diplomat and Labour politician
- Baron de Ramsey, a hereditary peerage created in 1887
- Lord Ramsey (disambiguation)
- Baron Romsey, a subsidiary title of Earl Mountbatten of Burma
