= 19th Battalion, London Regiment (St Pancras) =

Volunteer unit of the British Army (1860–1961)

19th Bn, London Regiment (St Pancras) 33rd (St Pancras) AA Bn, RE 33rd (St Pancras) S/L Regiment, RA 632nd (St Pancras) Regiment, RA 568 (St Pancras) LAA/SL Regiment, RA
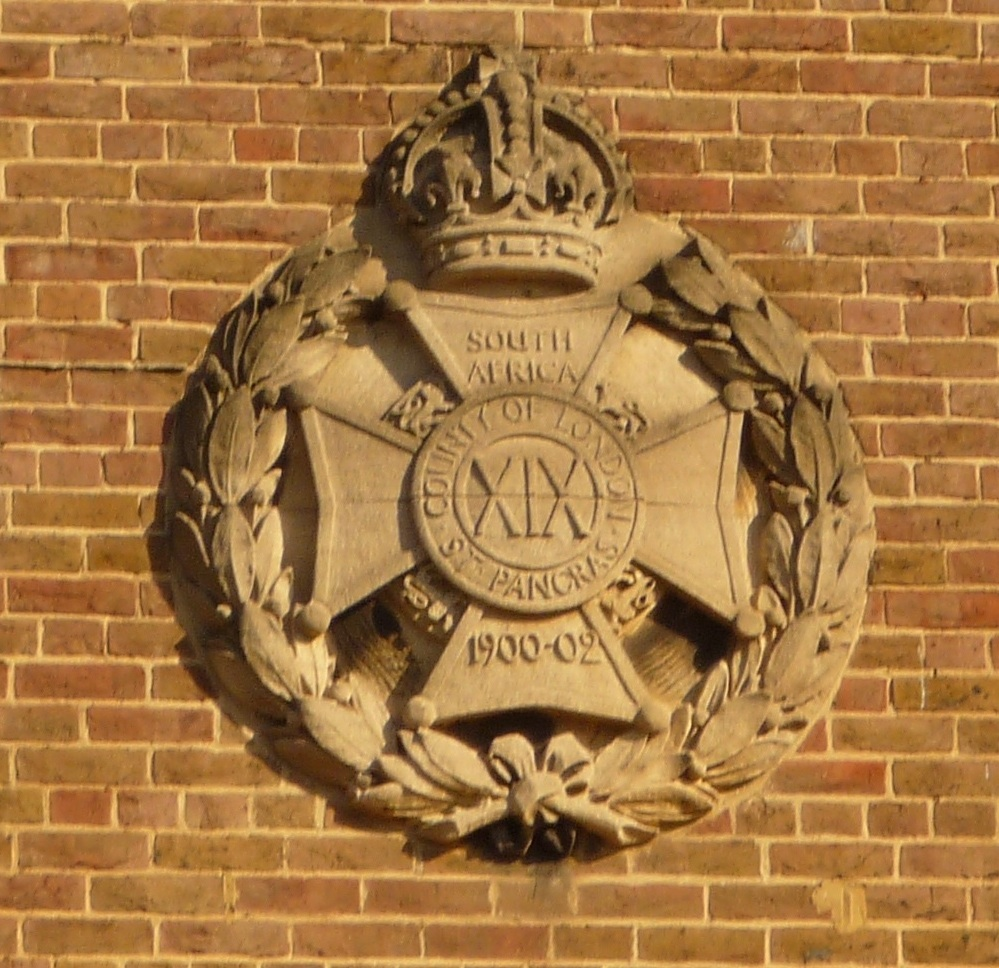
- Badge of the 19th London Regiment from the Albany Street drill hall.
- Active: 28 February 1860 – 1 May 1961
- Country: United Kingdom
- Branch: Territorial Army
- Type: Infantry Battalion, Searchlight Regiment, Anti-Aircraft Regiment
- Role: Infantry, Air Defence
- Nickname: Christie's Minstrels (2/19th Bn)
- Engagements: Western Front; Salonika; Palestine; The Blitz; Baby Blitz

Commanders
- Notable commanders: Lord Enfield

The 19th Battalion, London Regiment (St Pancras) was a Volunteer unit of the British Army in existence from 1860 to 1961 under various titles. A detachment served in the Second Boer War and two full battalions fought in World War I, receiving the surrender of Jerusalem and crossing the Jordan among other exploits. During World War II the regiment operated as a searchlight unit and briefly as an infantry battalion, before becoming an anti-aircraft regiment in the postwar years.

== Origin ==
The invasion scare of 1859 led to the creation of the Volunteer Force and huge enthusiasm for joining Rifle Volunteer Corps (RVCs). However, in some areas such as London and its suburbs, the number of proposed units outstripped the available recruits, and the Lord Lieutenant of Middlesex, the Marquis of Salisbury, tried to rationalise them into a smaller number of better-supported RVCs. In the Parish of St Pancras, two leading Parliamentary spokesmen for the Volunteer movement proposed competing units: Lord Elcho (MP for Haddingtonshire) wanted to form the 'Euston Road Rifles', while Lord Enfield (MP for Middlesex) was organising the 'North Middlesex' RVC. Salisbury merged the two into the 29th (North Middlesex) Middlesex Rifle Volunteer Corps under Enfield's command. (Elcho was already a very active commanding officer of the London Scottish RVC; Enfield also held the ceremonial position of Honorary Colonel of the 2nd or Edmonton Royal Rifle Regiment of Middlesex Militia.) The first commissions for officers of the 29th Middlesex were issued on 28 February 1860. The uniform was grey with scarlet facings and a grey fur Busby with a plume.

The new unit had its first headquarters at Kent Lodge in Park Village East, near Regent's Park, and later had a drill hall in Pratt Street, Camden Town. It was successful in attracting working-class recruits from the railway yards and densely populated areas of Camden Town, Kentish Town and Somers Town north of Euston Road. In 1880, following mergers and disbandments of less successful units, the 29th Middlesex was renumbered 17th. The following year it became the 4th Volunteer Battalion of the Middlesex Regiment (3rd Volunteer Battalion from 1892), but retained its title of 17th (North Middlesex) RVC.

== Boer War ==
The battalion sent a Service Company of volunteers to South Africa to serve alongside the Regulars of the 2nd Battalion Middlesex Regiment in the Second Boer War and as a result received its first Battle Honour: South Africa 1900–02. Four of these volunteers died on service and are commemorated by a plaque now in St Pancras Parish Church.

== Territorial Force ==
Under the Haldane Reforms, the former Volunteers were subsumed into the Territorial Force in 1908. The 17th Middlesex became the 19th (County of London) Battalion, The London Regiment (St Pancras) (TF) and formed part of 5th London Brigade in the 2nd London Division. Its new headquarters and drill hall was at 76 Camden High Street.

== World War I ==
The outbreak of war on 4 August saw the men of the 19th Londons at Perham Down on Salisbury Plain, where they had just arrived for their annual training camp with the rest of 2nd London Division. They were immediately recalled to Camden to complete their mobilisation and by mid-August the battalion had reached its war station at Hatfield, Hertfordshire. The County of London Territorial Force Association began raising 'Second Line' battalions, which led to the formation of a duplicate 2/19th London battalion; consequently the existing battalion was prefixed 1/19th. Subsequently, a reserve or 'Third Line' battalion (3/19th) was organised to supply drafts to the other two battalions.

== 1/19th Londons ==
In October 1914, 2nd London Division was selected for service on the Western Front and progressive training was carried out through the winter. Men who had volunteered for Home Service only were transferred to the 2/19th Battalion. 5th London Bde was the leading element of the division to land in France on 9/10 March 1915. In May, the division (already known in France simply as 'The London Division' to distinguish it from the Regular Army 2nd Division) took its place in the line and was designated 47th (1/2nd London) Division, with the brigades numbered consecutively: 5th London became 141st (1/5th London) Brigade. The 1/19th served in this brigade throughout the war.

=== 1915 ===
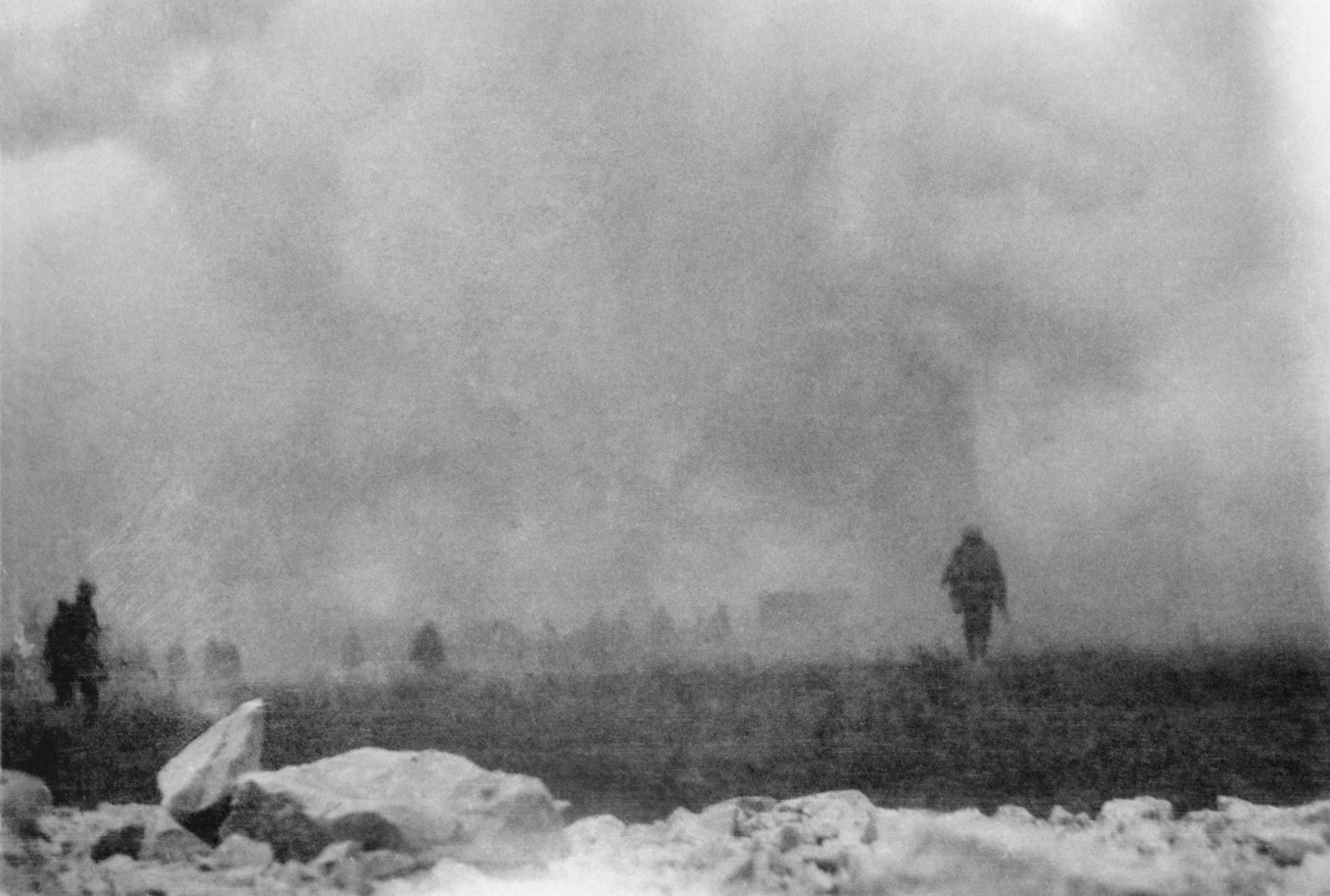
British infantry advancing through gas at Loos, 25 September 1915.

During 1915 the battalion was engaged in the following operations:

- Battle of Festubert 24–27 May
- Battle of Loos 25 September–1 October

At the Battle of Loos, the 1/19th formed part of the second wave attacking the southern side of Loos village itself. Its CO, Lt-Col Collison-Morley, was killed at the head of the battalion soon after leaving the trenches, and the 1/19th encountered stiff opposition in Loos cemetery before pushing on to clear houses and cellars in the village. It ended the day at its final objective, the coal-mine winding gear known as 'Tower Bridge'. 1/19th suffered the heaviest casualties in 47th Division that day (14 officers and 372 other ranks).

- Battle of the Hohenzollern Redoubt 13–19 October

=== 1916 ===
During 1916, the battalion was engaged in the following operations:

- Vimy Ridge – the units of 47th Division were involved in frequent crater-fighting in this sector from April to July 1916, including the major German attack on 21 May.
- Battle of the Somme:
  - Battle of Flers-Courcelette 15–19 September
  - Capture of High Wood 15 September – the 1/19th were in the second wave of the attack, but got caught up in the confused fighting. Their CO, Lt-Col A.P. Hamilton, assembled all the available men and went up into the wood to try to restore order, but was killed. High Wood, which had held up the British for two months, was finally taken, but casualties were so heavy that 141 Bde had to be reorganised into a composite battalion.
  - Battle of the Transloy Ridges 1–9 October
  - Capture of Eaucourt l'Abbaye 1–3 October
  - Attacks on the Butte de Warlencourt 7–8 October

=== 1917 ===
47th Division moved into the Hill 60 sector of the Ypres Salient in October 1916 and took part in regular raids and crater fighting for a number of months. It then took part in the following operations:

- Battle of Messines – in the weeks leading up to the battle, 141 Bde held the divisional front and carried out preparations for the attacks, including digging new trenches and establishing ration and ammunition dumps. For the attack on 7 June it was in support, moving up to relieve 142 Bde two days later.

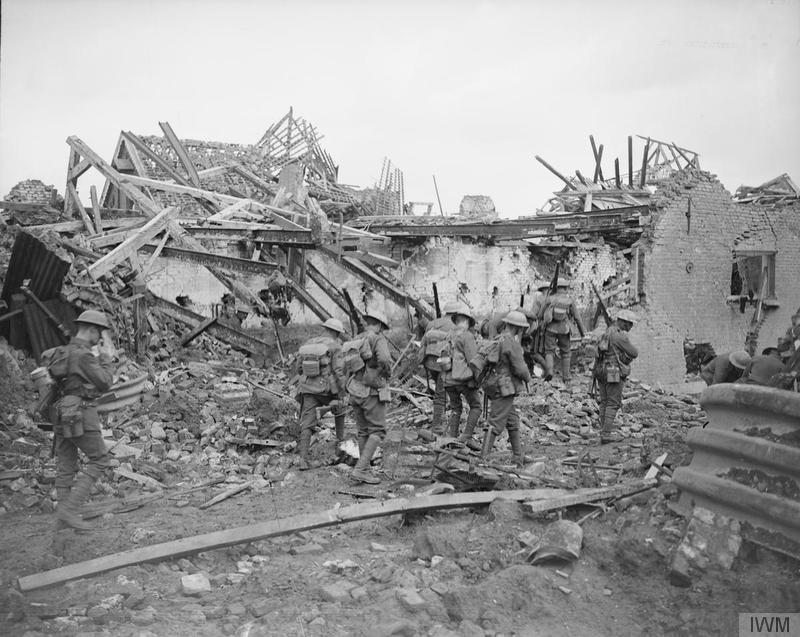
A patrol of 1/19th Londons moves through a shattered village near Ypres, 27 August 1917

- 3rd Battle of Ypres – 47th Division was not directly involved in the offensive, being in reserve during the Battle of Pilckem Ridge (31 July–2 August) and spending two periods holding the line (18 August–2 September and 8–17 September), described as 'among the most unpleasant in its experience'.
- Battle of Cambrai – 141 Bde took over the recently captured Bourlon Wood on 29 November in time to be hit by the German counter-attack the following morning. 1/19th Londons were badly affected by the enemy bombardment, particularly by gas shells. Out of 15 officers and over 600 men of the battalion who took up position in the wood, only 5 officers and 65 other ranks remained in the line by the end of the day, and many of these were later evacuated to hospital suffering from the effects of gas.

=== 1918 ===
By early 1918, the British Army was suffering a severe manpower shortage and a number of battalions were disbanded to bring others up to strength. In February, the 1/19th received a large draft of 14 officers and 375 men from A, B and D Companies 1/7th Londons in 140th (4th London) Brigade.

When the German Spring Offensive opened on 21 March, 47th Division had just relieved another formation in the line and were holding the right flank of Third Army. The main blow fell on Fifth Army to the south, but the Londoners were heavily bombarded and later in the day the Germans attacked behind a smoke screen. 1/19th took part in the successful counter-attack to regain the positions lost. However, Fifth Army was collapsing and 47th Division, with its flank open, was obliged to fall back on successive lines of half-dug trenches. The retirement, with rearguards contesting the German advance throughout, went on for six days and casualties were heavy. By the end, the remnants of 1/19th and 1/20th Londons were formed into a composite battalion.

The Germans attempted to renew the offensive on 5 April. By now 47th Division had reorganised. Most of 1/19th was with 141 Bde in divisional reserve, but one company was in the front line still attached to 1/20th. The attack was made after an intense bombardment, and fighting went on all day, with reserves fed in progressively. The Germans made some gains, but the line held. 47th Division was relieved that night.

47th Division now had three quiet months, resting and then holding a quiet sector of the line, which gave the battalions time to absorb the hundreds of 18-year-old recruits they were sent to fill up their ranks. It was then engaged in the following operations:

- Battle of Albert 22–23 August – The division joined the Allied counter-offensive in this battle. 141 Brigade began their advance at 0445, and gained their objective with little resistance, but in the morning mist and battle smoke the battalions began to consolidate a little short of the intended line; the follow-up units suffered heavily.
- 2nd Battle of Bapaume 31 August–3 September – 141 Bde advanced behind a creeping barrage at 0530, gained all the ground required, and continued to advance the following day. A new dawn attack on 5 September suffered a check, so it was successfully repeated under cover of a barrage and a thunderstorm at 1900, followed by a further push on 6 September.

After a further period of rest, 47th Division was preparing for a move to the Italian Front when it was instead ordered to take part in the final operations on the Western Front. On 1 October, 141 Bde was hurried forward to keep in touch with the retreating Germans. Like the rest of the brigade, 1/19th Bn was now very weak, and further casualties were suffered from German rearguards, but the brigade took Aubers Ridge, scene of previous costly attacks during the war. The pursuit continued until, on 4 October, the 1/19th secured a position on the strongly-held Armentieres-Wavrin railway embankment. The advance was resumed on 16 October, 1/19th coming upon Fort d'Englos, one of the string of forts encircling Lille. On 28 October the division accompanied Third Army's commander, Sir William Birdwood on his ceremonial entry into Lille. 141 Brigade resumed its place in the Line on 31 October and took up positions along the River Schelde. The river was crossed on 9 November, and the Armistice with Germany on 11 November found the battalions of 141 Bde administering the liberated city of Tournai.

=== 1919 ===
Demobilisation of 47 Division began in early 1919. By March the units had been reduced to cadres, and these left for England in May.

=== Commanding Officers ===
The following officers commanded 1/19th Londons during World War I:

- Lt-Col P.T. Westmorland, CMG, DSO, to 2 June 1915
- Lt-Col H. Collison-Morley, killed in action 25 September 1915
- Lt-Col A.P. Hamilton, MC, killed in action 15 September 1916
- Major C.H. Fair, DSO
- Lt-Col J.G. Stokes, DSO, MC
- Lt-Col E.J. Collett
- Lt-Col R.S.I. Friend, DSO
- Maj J.J. Sheppard, DSO, MC, to May 1918
- Lt-Col H. De L. Fergusson, DSO, to August 1918
- Maj J.J. Sheppard, DSO, MC, to September 1918
- Lt-Col Hutchisson, to December 1918
- Maj C.J. Bantick, until demobilisation

== 2/19th Londons ==
In the enthusiasm of August 1914, it took only a fortnight to recruit the 2/19th battalion to full strength. One whole company was enlisted from the Railway Clearing House and the rest of the battalion from other local businesses and organisations such as London Zoo in Regent's Park. Early training was undertaken in civilian clothes, parading in the drill hall and then marching to Regent's Park for training. The first commanding officer was Lt-Col E.J. Christie, a believer in singing on the march, and the battalion soon became known as 'Christie's Minstrels'. In October, the battalion absorbed the unfit and Home Service men of 1/19th, but lost some of its best recruits in exchange. The Home Service men were later passed on to the 3/19th (Reserve) Battalion.

The organisation of the Second Line Territorials was a duplicate of the First Line, so that 2/19th Londons was assigned to 2/5th London Brigade in 2/2nd London Division. At the end of 1915, these were redesignated 180th (2/5th London) Brigade and 60th (2/2nd London) Division respectively, and sent to Sutton Veney on Salisbury Plain for intensive training prior to going overseas.

By the time the 2/19th Battalion arrived at Salisbury Plain in January 1916, it was much depleted by the drafts it had sent to the 1/19th in France. It was brought up to strength by a draft from the Middlesex Regiment, the return of the Home Service men from 3/19th (the passage of the Military Service Act in January 1916 made them liable for overseas service), and by a draft of 250 volunteers from the Royal Army Medical Corps (who were untrained in infantry work).

=== Western Front ===
2/19th Battalion landed in France on 25 June 1916. After a period of familiarisation alongside the experienced 1/5th Seaforth Highlanders, the battalion took over a section of the line on Vimy Ridge. Over succeeding weeks, the 2/19th alternated in the line, in support and in reserve with the 2/17th Londons. The 60th Division adopted coloured flashes painted on each side of the steel helmet to aid recognition: 180 Bde adopted a triangle, which was blue in the case of the 2/19th Bn. During the summer the battalion was engaged in occasional crater-fighting and trench-raiding. After five months in the line, it had suffered around 200 casualties, 40 of them fatal.

=== Salonika ===
On 1 November, 60th Division was ordered to prepare to move to the Macedonian front, and the battalion embarked at Marseille on 25 November and landed at Salonika on 1 December. It began the march north on 18 December and went into the line on Christmas Eve. The battalion was peripherally involved in the Battle of Doiran 24–5 April and 8–9 May 1917.

=== Palestine ===
The 60th Division was next transferred to the Egyptian Expeditionary Force for the Sinai and Palestine Campaign. The 2/19th left Lake Doiran on 1 June and marched back to Salonika where it embarked on 10 June. After a period of training and acclimatisation in the Canal Zone, the battalion moved up to the front in July. On 31 October, the battalion was with 180th Brigade in divisional reserve for the Battle of Beersheba, but the attack was so successful that it never came into action. On 6 November the 2/19th was one of the attacking battalions that captured the Kauwukah position during the Battle of Hareira and Sheria. The Sheria position remaining untaken, the brigade attacked again the following day, and the 2/19th suffered heavy casualties, the acting commanding officer, Major A.W. Gray, being killed.

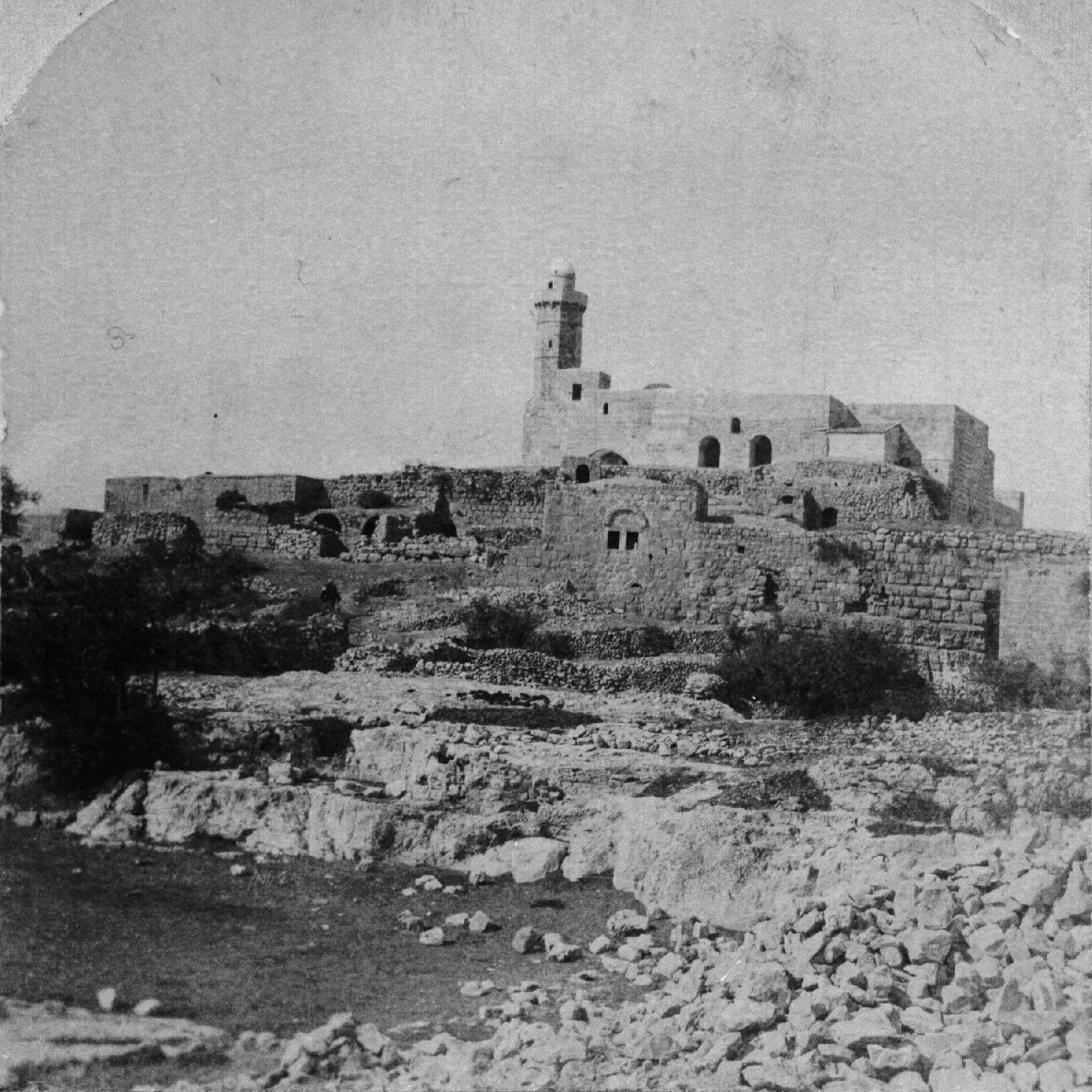
Nebi Samwil mosque before the battle

The pursuit through the Judaean Hills saw the battalion engaged at the Battle of Mughar Ridge and by 25 November it took over the Nebi Samwil position a few miles from Jerusalem. This position had been captured after heavy fighting by British and Indian troops. On 27 November, the Turks opened a heavy bombardment on the mosque that crowned the hill, which was held by D Company of 2/19th. This was followed by wave after wave of attacks, but the company, without significant artillery support, drove them all back, causing several hundred casualties.

During the night of 7/8 December, the 2/19th began the attack on Jerusalem by taking the Deir Yesin position. After a holdup in daylight, the battalion renewed the attack in the afternoon. The following morning, the Turks had retreated. Sergeants Hurcomb and Sedgewick went out to reconnoitre and met the Mayor of Jerusalem and a party of civilians who offered them the keys of the abandoned city. After the capture of Jerusalem, the 2/19th, reduced to some 300 men, went into billets in the city. On 11 December, it provided a guard of honour for General Allenby's ceremonial entry into the city.

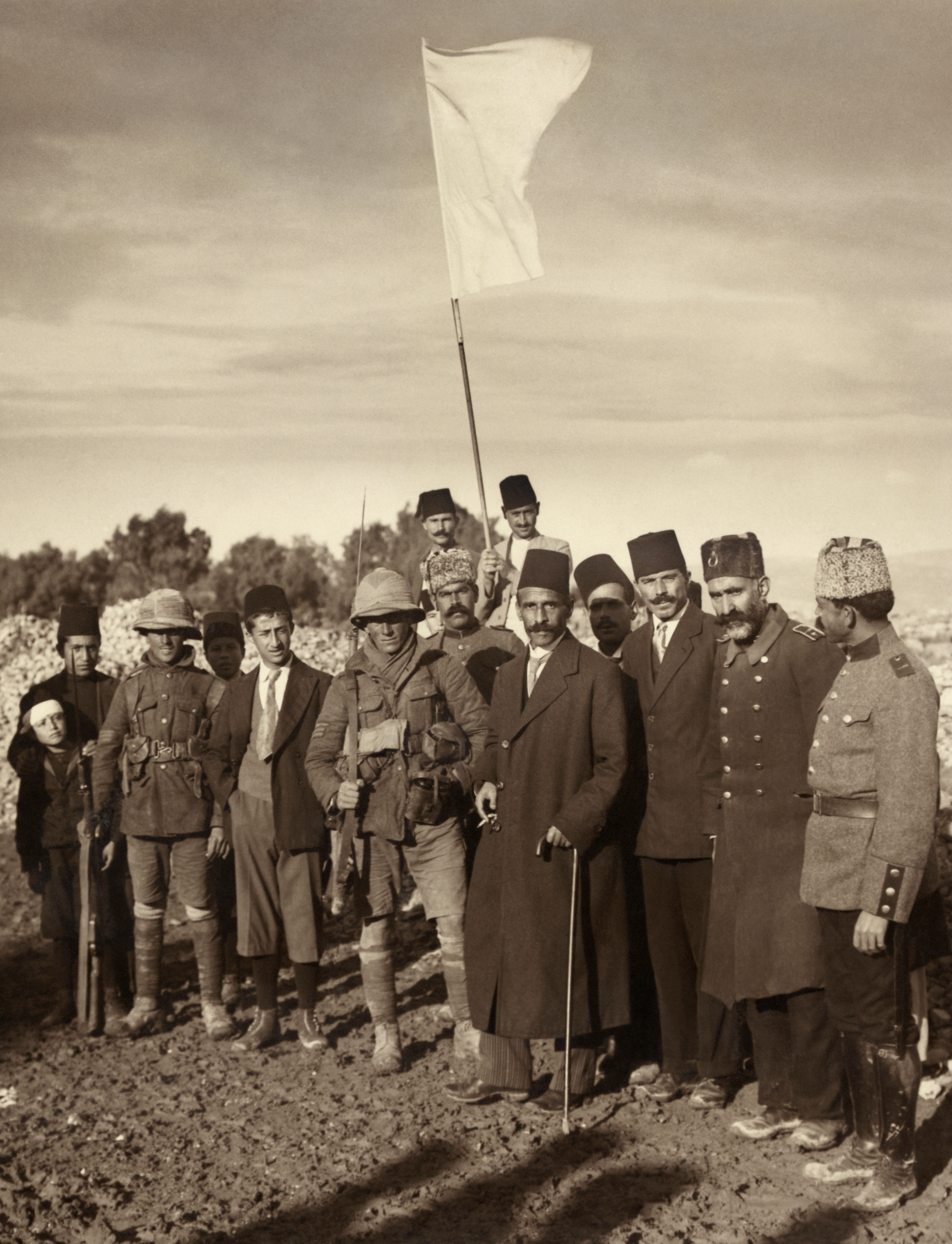
Sergeants Hurcomb (right) and Sedgewick (left) with the Mayor of Jerusalem and his delegation

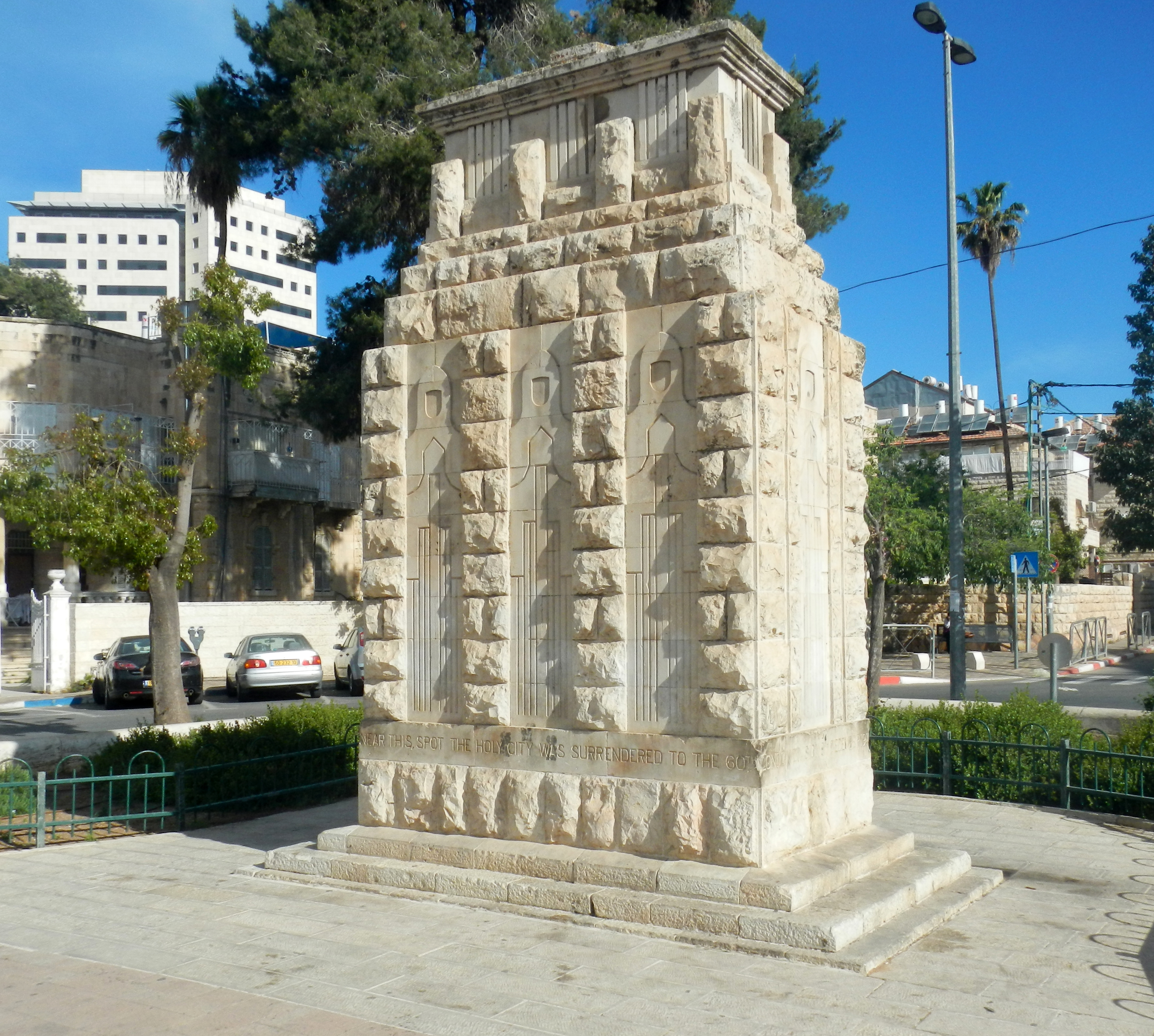
Monument to the surrender of Jerusalem to the 60th London Division.

The Turkish counter-attack on Jerusalem began on 27 December. When 180th Brigade relieved the defenders who had beaten off the initial Turkish attacks, it went over to the offensive, with 2/19th capturing the slopes of Shab Saleh. After a pause, Allenby resumed his advance and the 2/19th took part in the capture of Jericho on 19–21 February 1918, storming Talat ed Dumm.

The battalion took part in the 1st and 2nd Trans-Jordan raids of 21 March–2 April and 30 April–4 May. On the first occasion (the Battle of Hijla), the leading elements of the 2/19th struggled across the river by swimming and rafting during the night of 21/22 March while other battalions were driven back. Once a pontoon bridge had been completed and reinforcements arrived, the advance continued in the afternoon of 22 March with artillery support. But the next position could not be taken and the troops were pinned down until nightfall, the 2/19th suffering heavy casualties. A second night attack succeeded in extending the bridgehead. The battalion remained in reserve during the subsequent attack on Amman, and covered the retirement of the raiding force to the bridgehead.

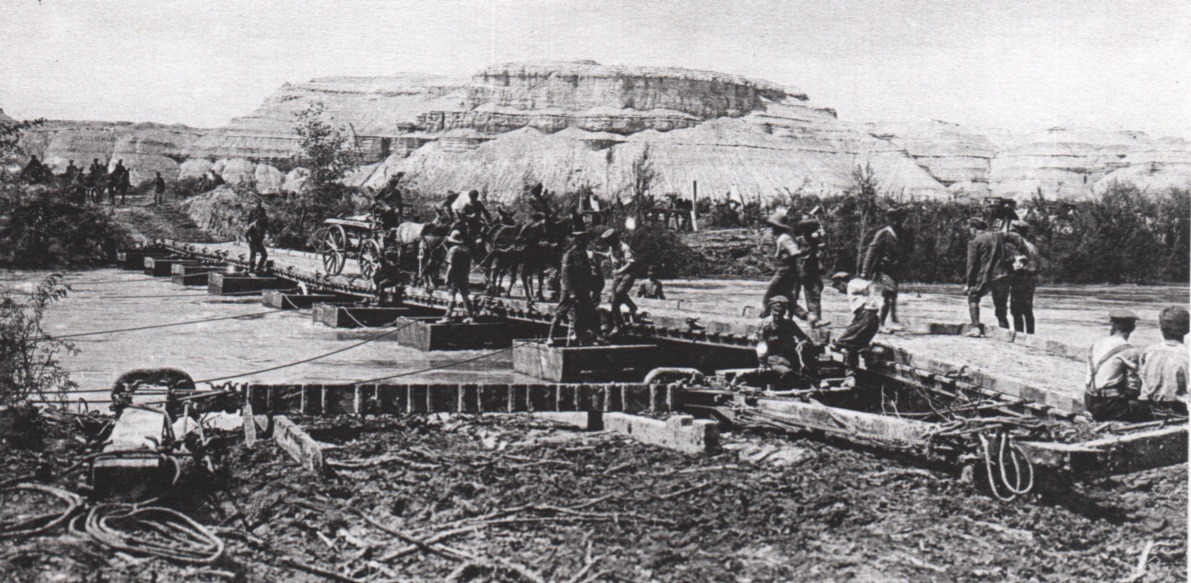
The pontoon bridge across the Jordan

In the 2nd Transjordan raid, the 2/19th attacked out of the Jordan bridgehead. The night attack on 29/30 April became bogged down with heavy casualties against strengthened Turkish positions. The leading companies held out during the daylight hours until other units outflanked the position. The battalion then held the outpost line until the raiders returned on 4 May.

In the summer of 1918 many units from 60th Division were transferred to the Western Front and the division was converted to the Indian establishment. 2/19th Londons remained, however, as the sole British battalion in 180th Bde, alongside three newly recruited Indian Army units. The division was intensively trained for its part in the forthcoming Megiddo offensive.

At Zero hour on 19 September 1918, the Indian battalions of 180th Bde attacked, and had taken all their objectives by 05.40. The 2/19th Londons then passed through, forced the passage of the shallow Nahr el Faliq with some losses, and established a bridgehead on the far side by 07.20. 181st Brigade followed through and continued the attack. The division had accomplished all its tasks and played a major part in the final defeat of the Turkish army in Palestine. This set-piece battle is known as the Battle of Sharon.

The pursuit of the retreating Turks was so rapid that the infantry formations were left behind, and 2/19th Londons, together with the rest of 60th Division, was left to collect prisoners and secure captured stores along the line of advance until the Armistice with the Turks was signed on 30 October 1918.

=== 1919–20 ===
The 2/19th Londons spent the New Year at Alexandria, where it was required to keep order among the Egyptian population. In March 1919, it embarked for Lebanon, from where it was sent to Homs in Syria. On 24 March, the battalion was amalgamated with 2nd Battalion Leicestershire Regiment, but retained its identity, the HQ of 2nd Leicesters returning to the UK. In April, the composite battalion moved to Aleppo to keep order during the Partitioning of the Ottoman Empire. Parties of the battalion had already been sent home for demobilisation and, in October 1919, a large draft of men arrived from the Suffolk Regiment to maintain numbers. The battalion was disbanded on 21 January 1920 in Egypt.

=== Commanding Officers ===
The following officers commanded 2/19th Londons:

- Lt-Col E.J. Christie, from first raising
- Lt-Col D.C. Sword, DSO, from training on Salisbury Plain to Fall of Jerusalem; evacuated sick 2 January 1918
- Maj A.J. Gray (Royal Scots), acting during Battle of Hareira and Sheria, killed in action 7 November 1917
- Maj W.M. Craddock, DSO, (2/20th Londons), during Trans-Jordan raids
- Lt-Col A.E. Norton, DSO, (2/18th Londons), from reorganisation during summer 1918 to disbandment
- Maj C.S. Williamson, acting during final advance in Palestine

== 3/19th Londons ==
The Third-Line battalion was formed on 25 March 1915, when it went into camp in Richmond Park. Subordinate to the 2nd London Reserve Group (later Brigade), it trained drafts for the First and Second Line battalions and never left the UK. In January 1916, it moved to Winchester. On 8 April 1916, it was redesignated 19th (Reserve) Battalion, London Regiment, and in September it joined the 2nd London Reserve Brigade. It moved to Chisledon in Wiltshire in November 1917, and then Blackdown in March 1918 when it transferred to the 3rd London Reserve Brigade. By October 1918, it was at Hunstanton, and it was disbanded on 11 June 1919, when it was probably at Shoreham-by-Sea.

== 32nd Londons ==
The remaining Home Service men of the TF were separated when the 3rd Line battalions were raised in May 1915, and were formed into Provisional Battalions for home defence. The men of the 17th Londons joined with those from the 20th (Blackheath and Woolwich) and 22nd (Queen's) Battalions of the London Regiment to form 106th Provisional Battalion (Territorial Force) at Frinton-on-Sea in Essex. It joined 7th Provisional Brigade in the defences of East Anglia.

The Military Service Act 1916 swept away the Home/Foreign service distinction, and all TF soldiers became liable for overseas service, if medically fit. The Provisional Brigades thus became anomalous, and their units became numbered battalions of their parent units. On 1 January 1917 106th Provisional Bn amalgamated with 108th Provisional Bn (the former home service men of the 23rd and 24th (Queen's) Bns, London Regiment) to become 32nd (County of London) Battalion, London Regiment, in 226th Mixed Bde, attached to 71st Division from 13 April 1917. By May 1917, the battalion was at Walton-on-the-Naze in Essex. Part of the role of the former provisional units was physical conditioning to render men fit for drafting overseas, and as men were drafted the 32nd Londons was run down, and it was disbanded on 13 April 1918.

== Interwar ==
On 16 February 1920, the 47th Division began to reform in the new Territorial Army, and by 1922 the battalion had fully reformed as the 19th London Regiment (St Pancras) (TA) in 141 (5th London) Bde. (The London Regiment had disappeared as a separate entity during World War I, and its battalions were now designated as 'Regiments' within their previous parent regiment – the Middlesex Regiment in the case of the 19th Londons.)

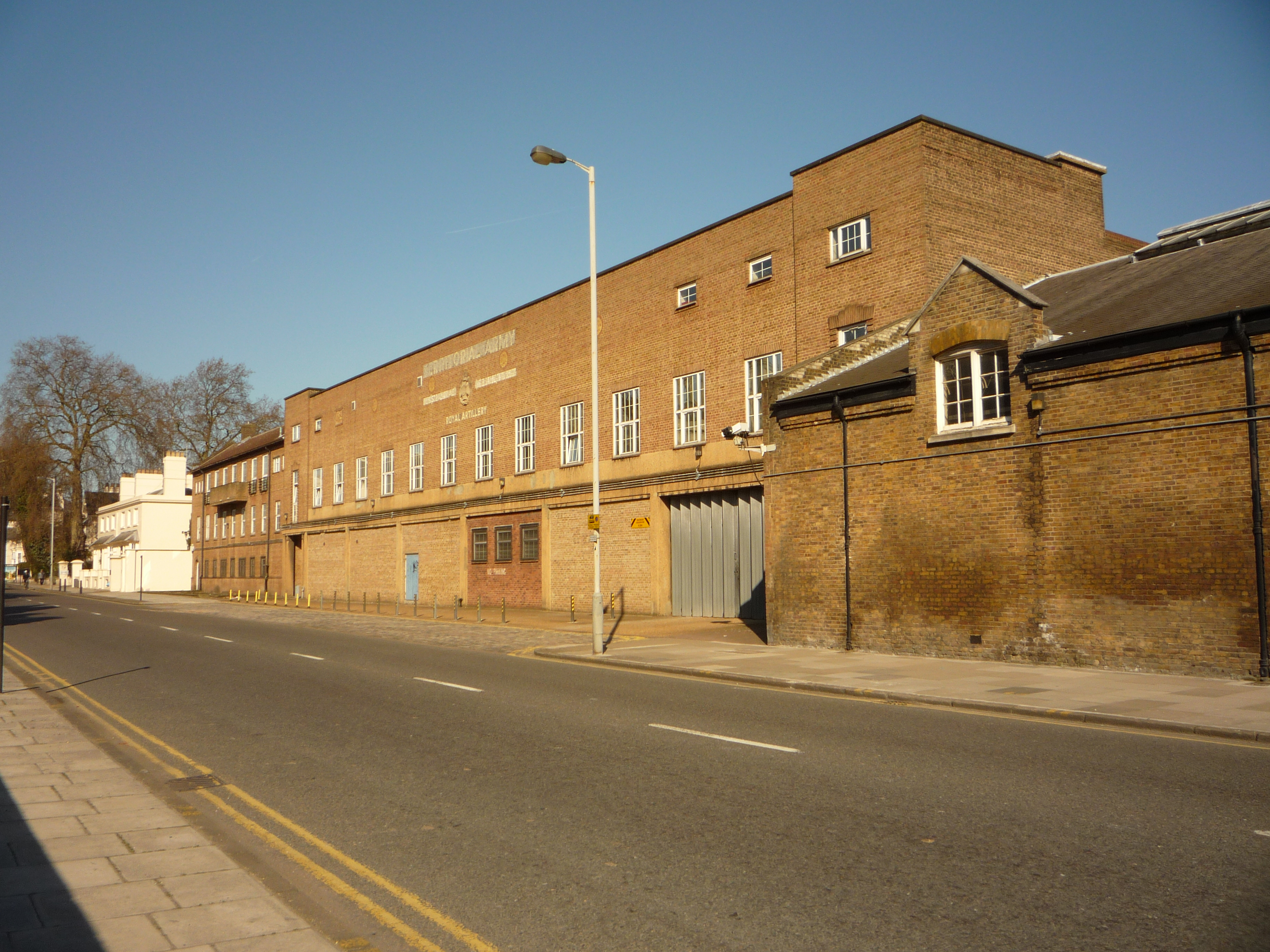
The regiment's 1930s drill hall at Albany Street

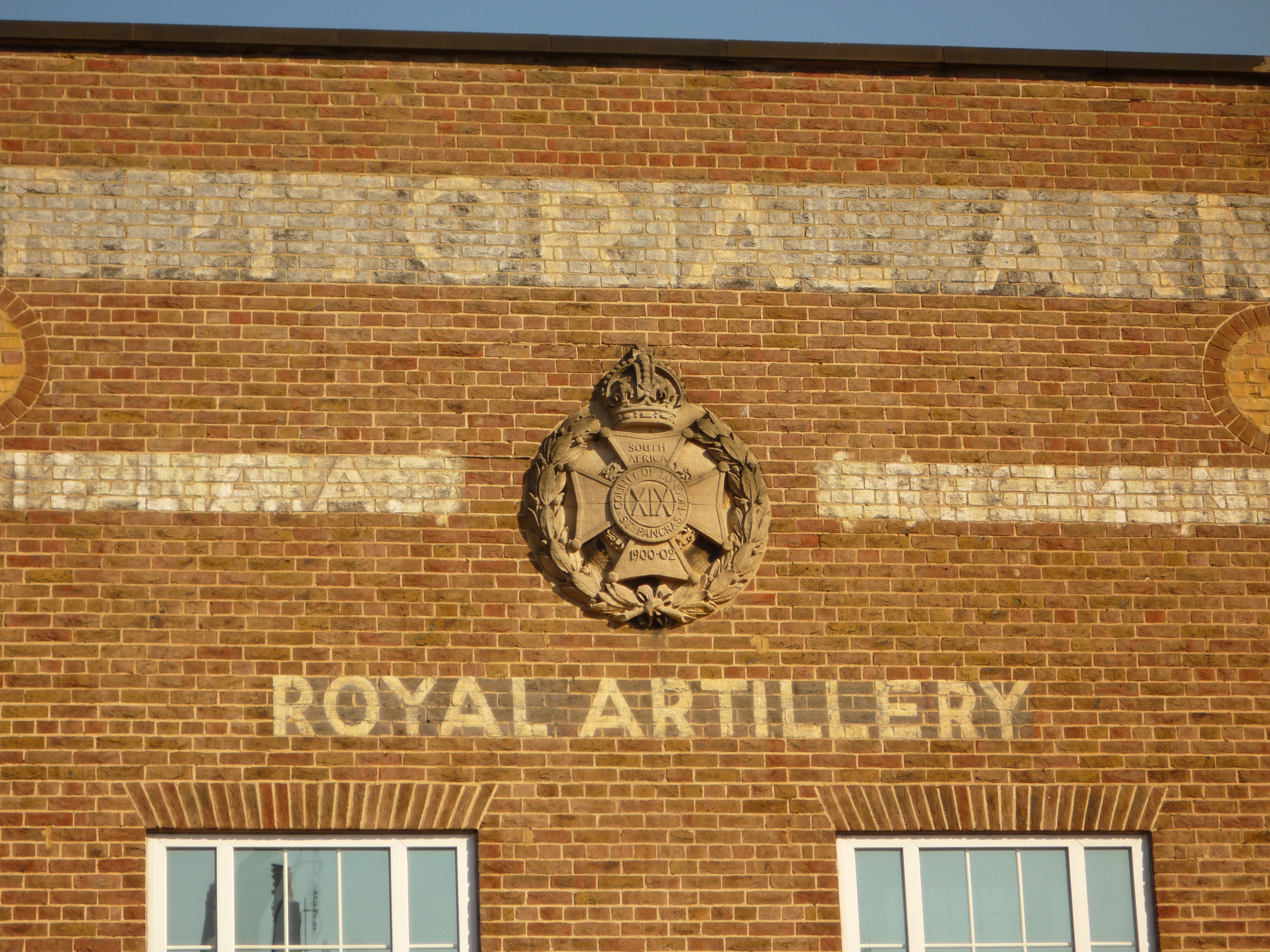
Detail of the drill hall, showing changes of name painted over

In 1935, the 47th Division was converted into the 1st Anti-Aircraft Division and 19th London was selected as one of its TA infantry battalions to be converted into searchlight units; on 1 November, it was transferred to the Royal Engineers and redesignated 33rd (St Pancras) Anti-Aircraft Battalion RE (TA). Shortly afterwards it joined 29th (East Anglian) Anti-Aircraft Brigade. At this point the battalion's HQ and two searchlight companies (Nos 332 and 333) were still based at 76 Camden High Street, but soon afterwards they moved to a new drill hall at Albany Street. 334 Company was newly raised by the Hertfordshire (rather than London) Territorial Association, which provided a new drill hall in St Albans Road, Barnet, opened in April 1938. The Hon Carol Fellowes was commissioned as major in command. Fellowes had served as a lieutenant in the Royal Norfolk Regiment in Mesopotamia in 1917–19. A further company (No 335) was based at another new drill hall at Tottenham High Road, but early in 1939 this company and establishment were transferred to a new 74th (Essex Fortress) AA Battalion.

== 33rd (St Pancras) Searchlight Regiment ==
=== Mobilisation ===
33rd AA Battalion was mobilised on 26 September 1938 during the Munich Crisis and went to its war stations (334 Company to Baldock). It was stood down after 12 days. In June 1939, as the international situation worsened, a partial mobilisation of the TA was begun in a process known as 'couverture', whereby each AA unit did a month's tour of duty in rotation to man selected AA gun and searchlight positions. 334 Company was deployed on 13 August. On 24 August, ahead of the declaration of war, Anti-Aircraft Command was fully mobilised at its war stations:

90 cm Projector Anti-Aircraft, displayed at Fort Nelson, Portsmouth

- Battalion HQ: The Limes, Stansted Mountfitchet, Essex
- 332 AA Company: White Hart Hotel, Yeldham, Essex
- 333 AA Company: Hargrave Park, Stansted
- 334 AA Company: Colliers End, near Ware, Hertfordshire
- Mobilisation stores at Buntingford, Hertfordshire

The battalion mobilised in 29 AA Bde, but by the end of September 1939 had transferred to the new 40th Anti-Aircraft Brigade, covering East Anglia. 33rd AA Bn occupied S/L sites across Hertfordshire supporting the Debden Sector of No. 12 Group RAF, with battalion HQ at Stansted Mountfitchet. On 2 September, the day before war was declared, a colour party of the battalion returned to Albany Street and took the colours to St Pancras Town Hall for safekeeping. By mid-September, a detachment of the Auxiliary Territorial Service (ATS) had been attached to the battalion.

On 1 July 1940, 33rd AA Bn came under the command of 6 AA Bde HQ, newly arrived at Debden after participating in the Norwegian Campaign. The brigade ordered the construction of a concrete pillbox at each S/L site and each company and section HQ – a total of 75 in 33rd Bn's area. These were to provide defended patrol bases in the event of attack by enemy paratroops, and each site was joined by an infantry detachment and equipped with a wireless set.

=== The Blitz ===
On 1 August 1940, the RE 'Anti-Aircraft' (searchlight) battalions were transferred to the Royal Artillery, so the battalion became the 33rd (St Pancras) Searchlight Regiment RA (TA) and the AA companies and sections were redesignated searchlight batteries and troops.

On 10 August, Debden Sector was transferred from 12 Group to No. 11 Group RAF, so 6 AA Bde similarly transferred to 6th AA Division, responsible for the eastern approaches to London.

33rd S/L Rgt was largely unaffected by the Battle of Britain, but during the subsequent night Blitz on London it was active, particularly in cooperation with the night fighters of Debden Sector. The S/L layouts had been based on a spacing of 3500 yards, but due to equipment shortages this had been extended to 6,000 yards by September 1940. The difficulty of illuminating night bombers led to a redistribution of S/Ls into clusters of three lights, one of which was the 'master light' that would eventually be equipped with searchlight control radar (SLC). This meant that the clusters had to be spaced 10,400 yards apart. 33rd S/L Regiment carried out the redistribution during December 1940 and January 1941, but did not begin to receive SLC equipment until October 1941.

The regiment supplied a cadre of experienced officers and men to 230th S/L Training Rgt at Blandford Camp where it provided the basis for a new 520 S/L Bty formed on 14 November 1940. This battery later joined 85th S/L Rgt.

In May 1941, the regiment was required to form a composite troop of six searchlights withdrawn from cluster sites to defend the new night-fighter base at RAF Hunsdon. By July, this had become E Troop of 334 Bty. S/Ls were sometimes exposed as homing beacons for friendly aircraft. Once SLC equipment was widely available, 33rd S/L Rgt 'declustered' and reverted to deployment by single lights.

=== Mid-war ===
6 AA Division formation badge worn 1941.

By October 1941, the availability of SLC radar was sufficient to allow AA Command's S/Ls to be 'declustered' into single-light sites spaced at 10,400-yard intervals in 'Indicator Belts' along the coast and 'Killer Belts' at 6000-yard spacing inland to cooperate with the RAF's night fighters.

On 23 January 1942, 33rd S/L Rgt was increased by one battery, with 543 Bty joining from 89 S/L Rgt, though it was several months before it moved into the regimental area from Kent. 543rd S/L Bty had originally been formed in March 1941 from a cadre of 64th (1/6th Essex) S/L Rgt at 237 S/L Training Rgt at Holywood, Northern Ireland, with personnel mainly from Manchester. It had served with 89th S/L Rgt around Exeter and Plymouth during the latter part of the Blitz.

In January 1943, the growing ATS detachments allocated to AA units were reorganised: those with 33rd S/L Rgt became B Company, 6 AA Bde Group ATS, with a dedicated platoon to each S/L company.

On 10 April 1943, 33rd S/L Rgt was ordered to change places with 73rd (Kent Fortress) S/L Rgt in 27th (Home Counties) AA Bde, taking over four areas of Kent under Biggin Hill Sector of 11 Group RAF, with Regimental HQ at Faversham. This area was under regular attack by Luftwaffe fighter-bombers, and the defensive armament of S/L positions was increased, with twin Vickers K machine gun mountings being added to the existing Lewis guns. The regiment's first Category 1 'kill' came on the night of 15/16 September when a site of 334 Bty at Kingsgate shot down a Heinkel He 111 with Lewis and Vickers guns, shared with the local Light AA gun unit. In September, the regiment began to receive twin 0.5-inch Browning machine guns on power mountings. Between 21 January and 14 March 1944, the Luftwaffe carried out eleven night raids on London in the so-called 'Baby Blitz': two sites of 334 Bty shared another Cat 1 kill on 22/23 February.

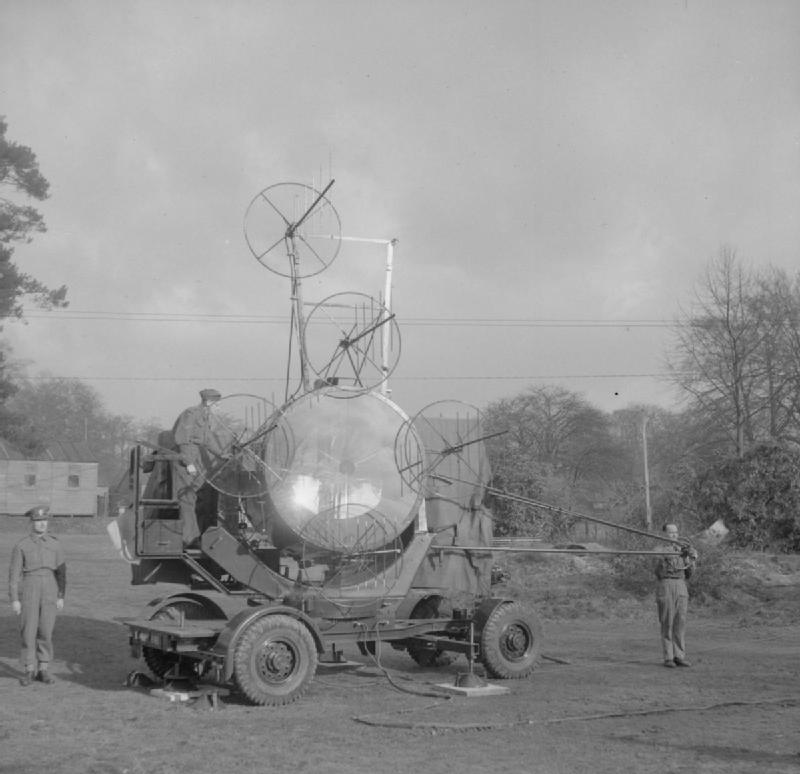
150 cm S/L with AA Radar No 2.

However, by early 1944, AA Command was being forced to release manpower for the planned invasion of Normandy (Operation Overlord). 33rd S/L Rgt's contribution came through the disbandment of 543 Bty on 6 March and E Trp of 334 Bty; however E Trp of 346 Bty, 36th (Middlesex) S/L Rgt joined on 13 March as D/332 Trp. From September 1943 the regiment had been carrying out experiments on new combinations of S/Ls and SLC; in July 1944 this was stepped up with the start of the V-1 flying bomb campaign against London, though Kent was on the fringe of the V-1s' route.

On 21 September, a USAAF B-17 Flying Fortress, attempting to reach the emergency airfield at RAF Manston, crashed onto one of the regiment's positions at Minster. Seven members of the detachment were commended for bravery in rescuing survivors from the burning wreck, and Lance-Bombardier Harkness and Gunner Bateman were later awarded the British Empire Medal.

As 21st Army Group overran the V-1 launching sites in Northern France, the Luftwaffe began to launch them from aircraft over the North Sea. AA Command shifted units from Kent to deal with the threat, and in November 33 S/L Rgt had to take over some of these units' sites along the East Kent coast.

== 632nd (St Pancras) Regiment ==
By the end of 1944, 21st Army Group was suffering a severe manpower shortage, particularly among the infantry. At the same time the Luftwaffe was suffering from such shortages of pilots, aircraft and fuel that serious aerial attacks on the United Kingdom could be discounted. In January 1945, the War Office began to reorganise surplus anti-aircraft and coastal artillery regiments in the UK into infantry battalions, primarily for line of communication and occupation duties in North West Europe, thereby releasing trained infantry for frontline service. 27th (Home Counties) Anti-Aircraft Brigade was one of the HQs selected for conversion, becoming 303rd Infantry Brigade on 22 January 1945. Within the brigade, 33rd S/L Rgt was redesignated 632nd (St Pancras) Infantry Regiment RA the following day.

The regiment reorganised as a garrison battalion at Eastbourne, with A Bty (HQ) and five rifle batteries designated B to E. Infantry training included a short period attached to 61st Infantry Division, when the regiment was reorganised again as conventional infantry battalion, with RHQ, HQ Bty, three rifle batteries (A–C), and Support Bty. After VE-day, 303 Bde was sent to Norway in June 1945 following the liberation of that country (Operation Doomsday). 632 Regiment left Eastbourne on 5 June to embark from Leith for Norway, where it carried out duties until early December 1945.

As a prewar TA unit, the regiment was not disbanded, but passed into 'suspended animation' on 31 January 1946 at Colchester.

== Postwar ==
The regiment was reformed on 1 April 1947 in 52 AA Brigade of the postwar TA as 568th (St Pancras) Searchlight Regiment RA, changing its designation on 16 March 1949 to 568th (St Pancras) (Mixed) Light Anti-Aircraft/Searchlight Regiment RA ('Mixed' indicating that it was composed partly of women of the Women's Royal Army Corps.) While the regiment reformed at Albany St, the company at Barnet was not reformed, and its drill hall was taken over as HQ for 479th (Hertfordshire Yeomanry) Heavy AA Rgt. 568th LAA/SL Regiment formed part of 54 (Thames & Medway) AA Bde.

In 1955, 568th LAA/SL Rgt merged with the 512th (Finsbury Rifles) and 656th (Tower Hamlets) LAA Regiments, becoming Q (St Pancras) Battery of the resulting 512 LAA Regiment in 33 AA Brigade. This regiment in turn was absorbed into 300 LAA Regt in 1961 when the St Pancras lineage was discontinued.

== Battle honours ==
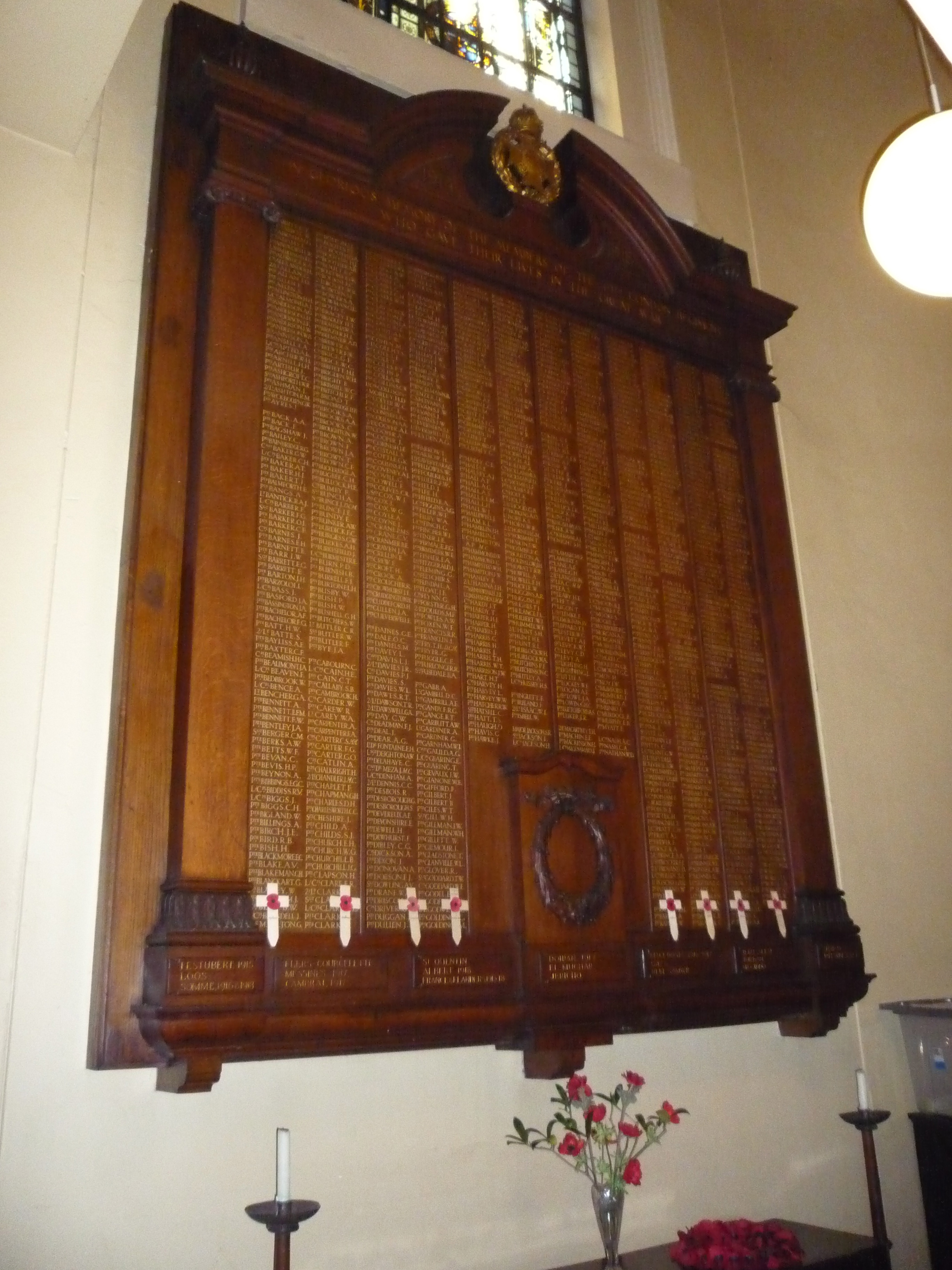
The 19th Londons' WWI memorial at St Pancras Church.

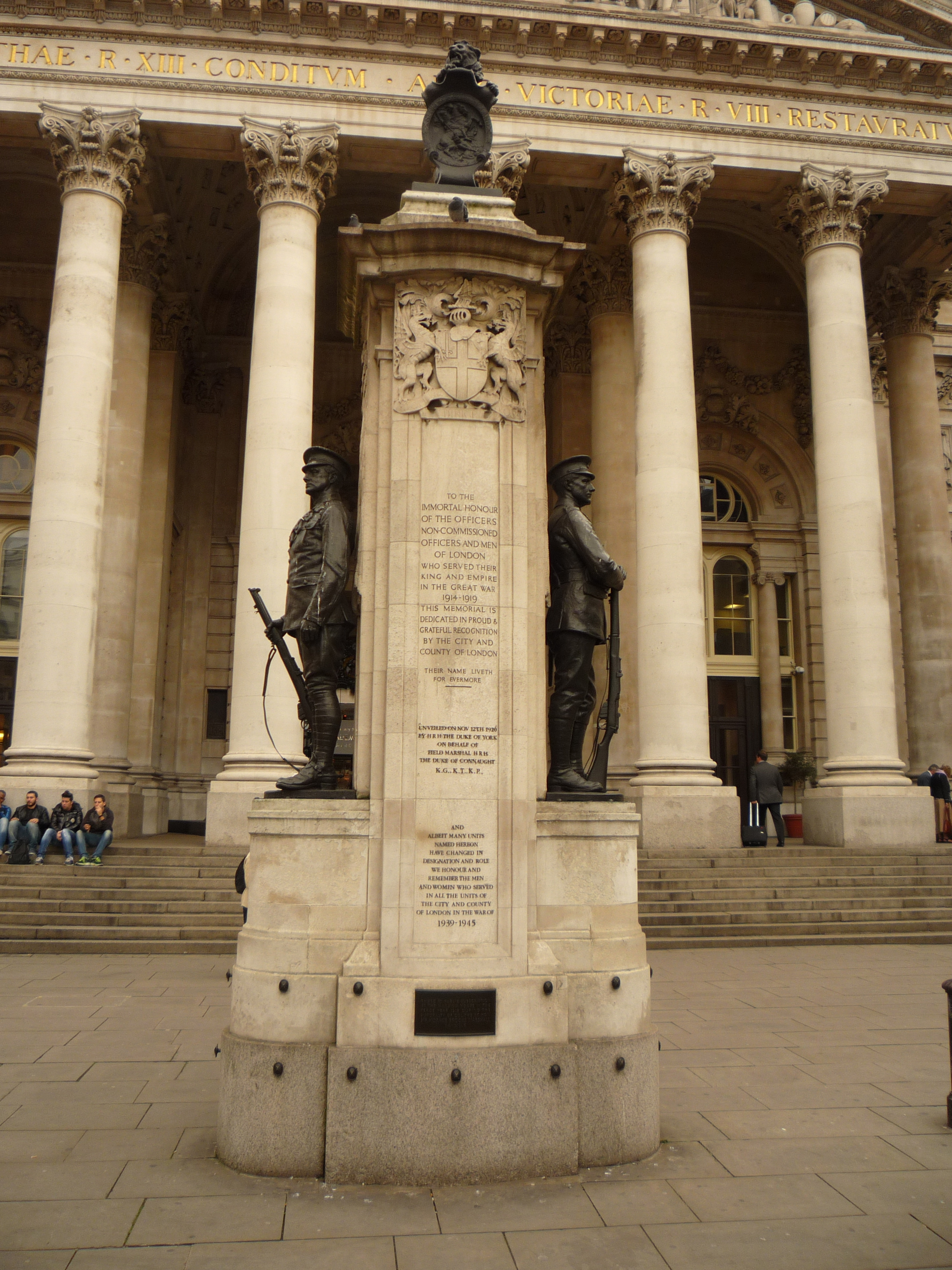
The London Troops Memorial at the Royal Exchange, London

The 19th Londons were awarded the following honours:

South Africa 1900–02

(1/19th): Festubert 1915, Loos, Somme 1916 '18, Flers-Courcelette, Morval, Le Transloy, Messines 1917, Ypres 1917, Langemarck 1917, Cambrai 1917, St Quentin, Bapaume 1918, Ancre 1918, Albert 1918, Pursuit to Mons

(2/19th): France and Flanders 1915–16, Doiran 1917, Macedonia 1916–17, Gaza, El Mughar, Nebi Samwil, Jerusalem, Jericho, Jordan, Megiddo, Sharon, Palestine 1917–18

Bold text indicates those honours selected to be displayed on the regiment's Colours. The Royal Artillery does not carry battle honours, so none were awarded to the regiment after its conversion.

== Insignia ==
Upon transfer to the Royal Engineers, the men of 33rd AA Battalion retained their 'XIX County of London' cap badge.

During the Munich crisis mobilisation, a group of sergeants from 334 Company stole a cockerel with saddle and reins from a roundabout at Baldock Fair. This subsequently became the inanimate mascot of the sergeants' mess, and a colour picture of it was adopted as the company's emblem, used as a vehicle marking in the early part of World War II.

After transfer to the RA, red-and-blue arm of service strips were sewn onto battledress.

== Honorary Colonels ==
The following were appointed Honorary Colonel of the regiment:

- George Byng, 3rd Earl of Strafford (formerly Lord Enfield), died 1898.
- Hon Col Sir W.J. Brown, KCB, VD, appointed 1899.
- Maj-Gen Sir William Thwaites, CB, KCMG, commander of 141 Bde 1915–16, appointed 1918.
- Brevet-Col R.W. Eaton, TD, appointed 1928
- Col Harry Louis Nathan, 1st Baron Nathan, PC, TD, DL, JP, appointed 1937.

== Memorials ==
The 1914–18 war memorial panel of the 19th Londons, formerly at the old drill hall in Camden High Street, is now in the South Vestibule of St Pancras Parish Church. It carries the names of 1069 members of the regiment who died during World War I. The 19th London's regimental badge is also included in the stained glass war memorial window in the North Gallery at St Pancras Church.

The 19th London is listed on the City and County of London Troops Memorial in front of the Royal Exchange, London, with architectural design by Sir Aston Webb and sculpture by Alfred Drury. The right-hand (southern) bronze figure flanking this memorial depicts an infantryman representative of the various London infantry units.
