= Alexander Boulton =

British Liberal Party politician

Alexander Claude Forster Boulton (1862 – 12 March 1949) was a barrister, British Liberal Party politician, author of legal text books, and co-founder of the Atlantic Union (the pre-coursor to the English-Speaking Union).

== Early life ==
Boulton was born at Port Hope, Canada, in 1862. He was educated at Trinity College School and Trinity College, Toronto, graduating in law in 1886. He practised at the Canadian Bar until 1891, when he settled in England after marriage and was called to the Bar by the Middle Temple later that year.

== Legal career ==
Boulton practised as a barrister on the South Eastern Circuit. From 1906 to 1931 he was Counsel for the General Post Office at the Central Criminal Court.

In 1908, he wrote Criminal Appeals Under the Criminal Appeal Act of 1907.

During World War I (1914–18) he was a Commissioner to the Local Government Board in Lancashire under the Military Service Act of 1916, and an arbitrator under the Ministry of Munitions.

== Election to Parliament ==
Boulton's career in the House of Commons lasted barely four years. He was elected at the 1906 general election as Member of Parliament for the Ramsey division of Huntingdonshire, a constituency which had been held by Conservatives since its creation in 1885.

General election 1906: Ramsey
Party	Candidate	Votes	%	±%
Liberal	Alexander Claude Forster Boulton	3,184	53.2	+15.6
Conservative	Ailwyn Fellowes	2,803	46.8	−15.6
Majority		381	6.4	
Turnout		5,987	88.7	+19.3
Liberal gain from Conservative		Swing	+15.6	

He was defeated at the January 1910 general election;

General election 1910 (January): Ramsey
Party	Candidate	Votes	%	±%
Conservative	Oliver Locker-Lampson	3,350	53.5	+6.7
Liberal	Alexander Claude Forster Boulton	2,915	46.5	−6.7
Majority		435	7.0	
Turnout		6,265	89.1	+0.4
Conservative gain from Liberal		Swing	+6.7	

He was unsuccessful when he stood again in December 1910.

General election 1910 (December): Ramsey
Party	Candidate	Votes	%	±%
Conservative	Oliver Locker-Lampson	3,072	51.0	−3.5
Liberal	Alexander Claude Forster Boulton	2,954	49.0	+3.5
Majority		118	2.0	
Turnout		6,026	85.7	−3.4
Conservative hold		Swing	−3.5	

Boulton did not stand again until the 1923 general election, when he fought the Conservative-held New Forest and Christchurch division of Hampshire. The seat had not been contested in either 1918 or 1922, and in a straight contest with the sitting Conservative MP, Boulton won 46% of the votes. Boulton stood again at the 1924 general election, when a Labour candidate also contested the seat. The Conservative vote increased, while Boulton's second-placed vote was less than half the Tory total. He did not stand for Parliament again.

Parliament of the United Kingdom
Preceded by Ailwyn Fellowes	Member of Parliament for Ramsey; 1906 – January 1910	Succeeded by Oliver Locker-Lampson
