= Ailwyn Fellowes, 1st Baron Ailwyn =

British politician (1855–1924)

The Right Honourable The Lord Ailwyn KCVO KBE PC DL
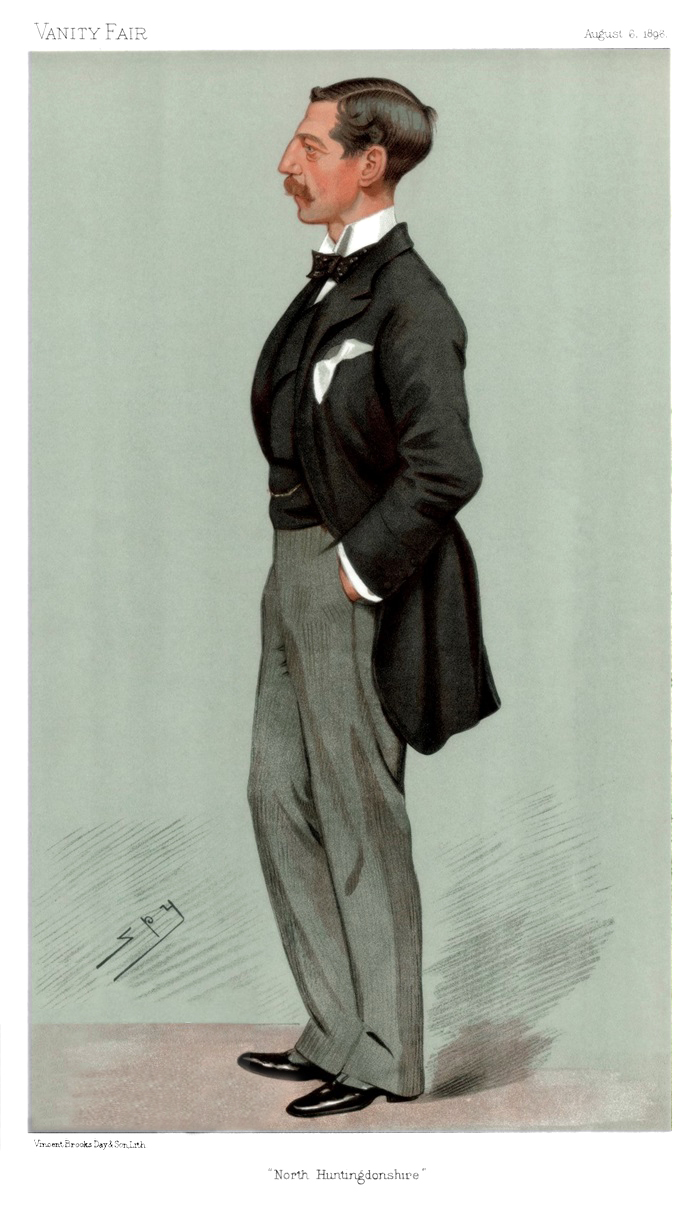

Vice-Chamberlain of the Household
- In office 10 July 1895 – 3 December 1900
- Monarch: Queen Victoria
- Prime Minister: The Marquess of Salisbury
- Preceded by: Charles Spencer
- Succeeded by: Sir Alexander Fuller-Acland-Hood, Bt

President of the Board of Agriculture
- In office 14 March 1905 – 4 December 1905
- Monarch: Edward VII
- Prime Minister: Arthur Balfour
- Preceded by: The Earl of Onslow
- Succeeded by: The Earl Carrington

Personal details
- Born: 10 November 1855 Haverland Hall, Norwich, Norfolk
- Died: 23 September 1924 (aged 68) Honingham Hall, Honingham, Norfolk
- Party: Conservative
- Spouse: Agatha Jolliffe (m. 1886)
- Education: Trinity Hall, Cambridge

Ailwyn Edward Fellowes, 1st Baron Ailwyn KCVO KBE PC DL (10 November 1855 – 23 September 1924) was a British businessman, farmer and Conservative politician. He was a member of Arthur Balfour's cabinet as President of the Board of Agriculture between March and December 1905.

== Background and education ==
Fellowes was born at Haveringland Hall, Norfolk, the younger son of Edward Fellowes (later Baron de Ramsey) and Mary Julia, daughter of George Milles, 4th Baron Sondes. William Fellowes, 2nd Baron de Ramsey, was his elder brother. He was educated at Eton and Trinity Hall, Cambridge. He trained as a barrister, but never qualified, turning instead to agriculture and politics. He inherited Honingham Hall in Norfolk from his aunt in 1887 and devoted much of his time to running and improving it.

== Political career ==
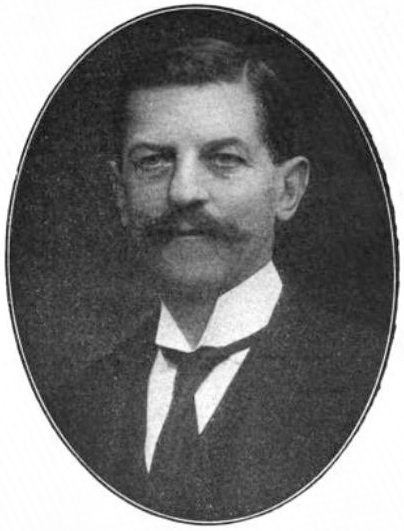
In The Railway News, 1 July 1911

Fellowes unsuccessfully contested Mid Norfolk in 1885 and North Norfolk in 1886 but won Ramsey in 1887 in a by-election following his brother's succession to the peerage. He held office under Lord Salisbury as Vice-Chamberlain of the Household between 1895 and 1900 and under Salisbury and Arthur Balfour as a Lord of the Treasury between 1900 and 1905. In March 1905 he was sworn of the Privy Council and appointed President of the Board of Agriculture by Balfour, with a seat in the cabinet, a post he held until the government fell in December 1905.

Between 1917 and 1919 Fellowes was chairman of the Agricultural Wages Board and deputy director of Food Production. Apart from his involvement in national politics he was chairman of Norfolk County Council from 1920, having been an alderman for many years. Fellowes was made a deputy lieutenant of Norfolk in 1909. He was appointed a Knight Commander of the Royal Victorian Order (KCVO) in 1911, after serving as deputy president of the Royal Agricultural Show to The King (George V), and a Knight Commander of the Order of the British Empire in 1917. In the 1921 Birthday Honours he was raised to the peerage as Baron Ailwyn, of Honingham in the County of Norfolk.

== Business career ==
Fellowes was also director of the London and North Eastern Railway, Norwich Union and the National Provident Association and deputy chairman of the Great Eastern Railway.

== Family ==
Lord Ailwyn married Agatha Eleanor Augusta, daughter of Hedworth Jolliffe, 2nd Baron Hylton, at St Paul's Church, Knightsbridge, on 9 February 1886. They had four sons:

- Ronald Townshend Fellowes, 2nd Baron Ailwyn (7 December 1886 – 30 August 1936)
- Eric William Edward Fellowes, 3rd Baron Ailwyn (24 November 1887 – 23 March 1976)
- Capt. Hedworth George Ailwyn Fellowes (10 July 1891 – 12 May 1917), killed in the First World War.
- Carol Arthur Fellowes, 4th Baron Ailwyn (23 November 1896 – 27 September 1988)

Lord Ailwyn died at Honingham Hall in September 1924, aged 68, and was buried in the grounds of the local church. Lady Ailwyn died in July 1938.

== Arms ==
Coat of arms of Ailwyn Fellowes, 1st Baron Ailwyn

Crest
A lion's head as in the arms charged with a fess dancetty Ermine.
Escutcheon
Azure a fess dancetty Ermine between three lions' heads erased Or murally crowned Argent a crescent for difference.
Supporters
On either side a lynx Argent spotted Sable ducally gorged and chained Or pendant from the coronet an escutcheon Ermine charged with a ram's eye Proper.
Motto
Patientia Et Perseverantia Cum Magnaninitate (Patience And Perseverance With Magnanimity

Parliament of the United Kingdom
Preceded by Edward Fellowes	Member of Parliament for Ramsey; 1887–1906	Succeeded by Alexander Boulton
Political offices
Preceded by Charles Spencer	Vice-Chamberlain of the Household; 1895–1900	Succeeded by Sir Alexander Fuller-Acland-Hood, Bt
Preceded by Henry Torrens Anstruther; William Hayes Fisher; Lord Stanley	Lord of the Treasury; 1900–1905; With: Henry Torrens Anstruther 1900–1903; William Hayes Fisher 1900–1902; Henry Forster 1902–1905; Lord Balniel 1903–1905	Succeeded by Henry Forster; Lord Balniel; Lord Edmund Talbot
Preceded by The Earl of Onslow	President of the Board of Agriculture; 1905	Succeeded by The Earl Carrington
Peerage of the United Kingdom
New creation	Baron Ailwyn; 1921–1924	Succeeded by Ronald Fellowes
