= Baron Ailwyn =

Title in the Peerage of the United Kingdom

Baron Ailwyn, of Honingham in the County of Norfolk, was a title in the Peerage of the United Kingdom. It was created on 1 July 1921 for the Conservative politician Sir Ailwyn Fellowes. He was the younger son of Edward Fellowes, 1st Baron de Ramsey. Lord Ailwyn was succeeded by the eldest of his four sons, Ronald, the second Baron. He was a lieutenant-colonel in the Rifle Brigade. He was childless and was succeeded by his younger brother Eric, the third Baron. He was a captain in the Royal Navy. He was also childless and was succeeded by his youngest brother, Carol, the fourth Baron. Like his elder brothers, he was childless and the title became extinct on his death in 1988.

== Barons Ailwyn (1921) ==
- Ailwyn Edward Fellowes, 1st Baron Ailwyn (1855–1924)
- Ronald Townshend Fellowes, 2nd Baron Ailwyn (1886–1936)
- Eric William Edward Fellowes, 3rd Baron Ailwyn (1887–1976)
- Carol Arthur Fellowes, 4th Baron Ailwyn (1896–1988)

== Arms ==
Coat of arms of Baron Ailwyn

Crest
A lion's head as in the arms charged with a fess dancetty Ermine.
Escutcheon
Azure a fess dancetty Ermine between three lions' heads erased Or murally crowned Argent a crescent for difference.
Supporters
On either side a lynx Argent spotted Sable ducally gorged and chained Or pendant from the coronet an escutcheon Ermine charged with a ram's eye Proper.
Motto
Patientia Et Perseverantia Cum Magnaninitate (Patience And Perseverance With Magnanimity)

== See also ==
- Baron de Ramsey
