= Battle of Hijla =

First World War battle

Coordinates: 31.816667°N 35.55°E

- Part of the Middle Eastern theatre of World War I
Date	21 March 1918
Location	Southern Jordan Valley, near the Dead Sea

Belligerents
British Empire	Turkish Empire

Commanders and leaders
Edmund Allenby	Jemal Pasha

The Battle of Hijla (21 March 1918) was fought by the forces of the British and Turkish Empires during the Sinai and Palestine Campaign of the First World War. Hijla (now called Makhadet Hijla', lit. 'Partridge Ford'; cf. nearby Deir Hajla) is on the River Jordan a few miles upriver from the Dead Sea. Today the river is the boundary between Jordan and the "West Bank" area presently administered by Israel and the Palestinian Authority, but in 1918 it was territory of Ottoman Turkey. The British invasion had succeeded in taking Jerusalem at the end of 1917. British General Edmund Allenby attempted a "raid" across the Jordan toward Amman in an effort to sever the railroad and resistance was met at Hijla and to the north at Ghoraniyeh, where fords provided means to cross.

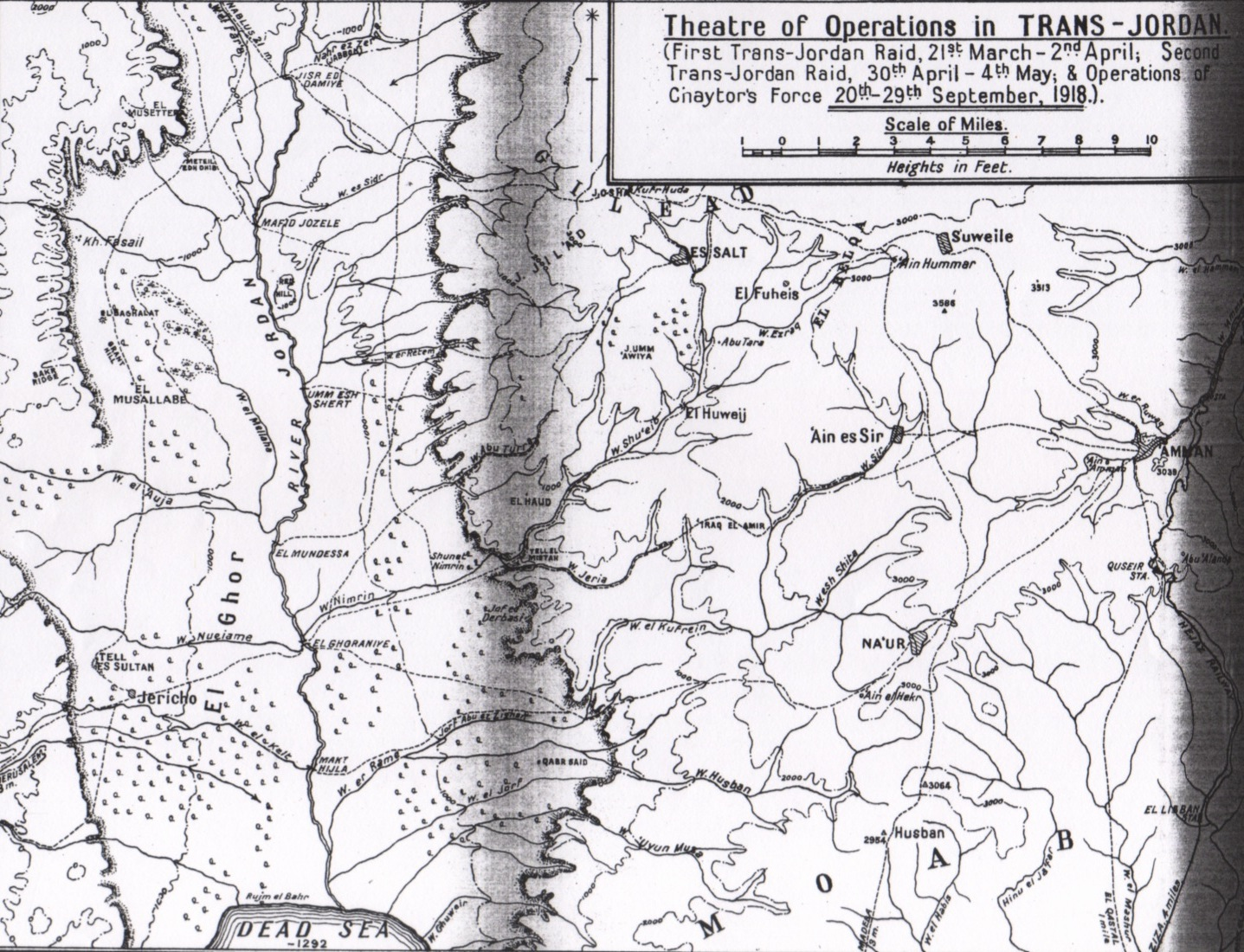
Transjordan theatre of operations. The Hijla Ford ("Mak[hade]t Hijla") is marked east of Jericho, at the confluence of "Wadi el-Kelt" and the River Jordan.

The river crossing was resisted by the Turks at both sites. The 2/19th Battalion (St. Pancras) London Regiment of the 60th Division tried to cross at Hijla, sending swimmers repeatedly across with ropes to attempt the construction of a pontoon bridge. Major Vivian Gilbert reported the events later. Many of the British soldiers were shot in the Jordan before the bridgehead could be established. Once established, the bridgeheads were maintained against the Turks, but the raids on Amman basically failed. This was the prelude to the Battle of Megiddo farther north in what is now Israel.
