= Fellows =

Fellows may refer to Fellow, in plural form.

Fellows or Fellowes may also refer to:

== Places ==
- Fellows, California, USA
- Fellows, Wisconsin, ghost town, USA

== Other uses ==
- Fellowes, Inc., manufacturer of workspace products
- Fellows, a partner in the firm of English canal carriers, Fellows Morton & Clayton
- Fellows (surname)
- Mount Fellows, a mountain in Alaska

== See also ==
- North Fellows Historic District, listed on the National Register of Historic Places in Wapello County, Iowa
- Justice Fellows (disambiguation)
