= Baron de Ramsey =

Title in the Peerage of the United Kingdom

Coat of Arms

Baron de Ramsey, of Ramsey Abbey in the County of Huntingdon, is a title in the Peerage of the United Kingdom. It was created in 1887 for Edward Fellowes, who had previously represented Huntingdonshire in the House of Commons as a Conservative for 43 years. His eldest son, the second Baron, sat as Member of Parliament for Huntingdonshire and Ramsey and later served as a Lord-in-waiting (government whip in the House of Lords) from 1890 to 1892 in the Conservative administration of Lord Salisbury. His grandson, the third Baron, was Lord Lieutenant of Huntingdonshire from 1947 to 1965 and of Huntingdon and Peterborough between 1965 and 1968. As of 2017 the title is held by the latter's son, the fourth Baron, who succeeded in 1993.

Ailwyn Fellowes, 1st Baron Ailwyn, was the younger son of the first Baron de Ramsey.

== Estates and residences ==
=== Country seat ===
Abbots Ripton Hall

The seat of the current Baron, John Fellowes, 4th Baron de Ramsey, is Abbots Ripton Hall near Abbots Ripton, Cambridgeshire.

=== Former residences ===
==== Ramsey Abbey ====
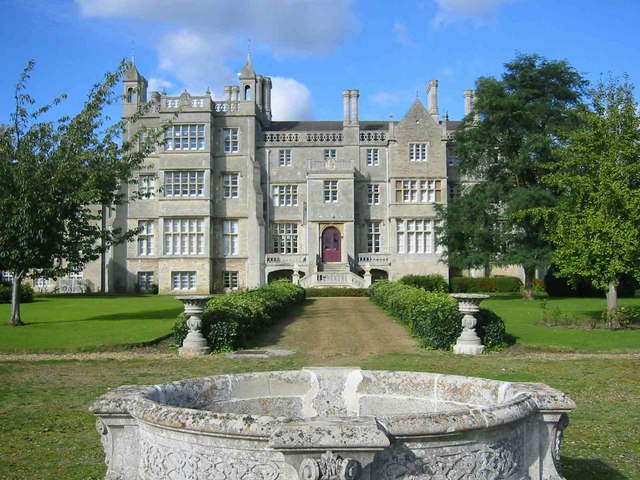
Ramsey Abbey

In 1737 the great-grandfather of the 1st Baron de Ramsey, Coulson Fellowes, purchased Ramsey Abbey, near Ramsey, Cambridgeshire. During the period from 1804 to 1806 the 1st Baron's father, William Henry Fellowes, enlarged the house to designs by Sir John Soane.

Ailwyn Fellowes, 3rd Baron de Ramsey, who had inherited the Barony and family estates at the age of 15, came of age in 1931, after which the family seat became Abbots Ripton Hall. In 1937 the 3rd Lord de Ramsey leased Ramsey Abbey to the Ramsey Abbey School for a term of 99 years.

==== Haveringland Hall ====
In 1839 Edward Fellowes engaged architect Edward Blore to design a new country house on his Norfolk estates near Haveringland. Completed in 1843, Haveringland Hall was a large, Italianate-style mansion faced in Bath stone comprising three-stories with corner attics, an observatory tower and roughly forty bedrooms. A clock-tower gateway—its mechanism said to match those at Buckingham Palace—formed the main approach. The Hall remained in the ownership of the Barons de Ramsey until the 1940s.

In February 1940 the agents Knight, Frank & Rutley advertised Haveringland Hall, described as "enlarged and brought up to date" to be let with 26 acres of immediate grounds—or, if desired, with the sporting rights over the entire 4,267-acre estate.

During the Second World War the grounds were requisitioned for RAF Swannington; the hall served as the officers’ mess from 1944. In November 1946 the 4,290-acre Haveringland Estate—including Haveringland Hall (then still requisitioned), 131 acres of parkland with its fishing lake, fifteen tenant farms, seventy-two houses and cottages, and two licensed public houses—was advertised for auction at Norwich on 30 November. The house was subsequently demolished in 1947.

=== Estates ===
In the 1883 edition of John Bateman's The Great Landowners of Great Britain and Ireland, Edward Fellowes of Ramsey Abbey, Huntingdonshire was listed as the owner of 20,021 acres in England, including 15,629 acres in Huntingdonshire, 4,083 acres in Norfolk, and 309 acres in Cambridgeshire, which yielded a combined annual income of £26,203.

In March 2000 the estates of John Fellowes, 4th Baron de Ramsey were reportedly valued at £35 million, and included approximately 11,000 acres across Huntingdonshire, Cambridgeshire and Lincolnshire.

== Barons de Ramsey (1887) ==
- Edward Fellowes, 1st Baron de Ramsey (1809–1887)
- William Henry Fellowes, 2nd Baron de Ramsey (1848–1925)
- Ailwyn Edward Fellowes, 3rd Baron de Ramsey (1910–1993)
- John Ailwyn Fellowes, 4th Baron de Ramsey (b. 1942)

The heir apparent is the present holder's son Freddie John Fellowes (b. 1978).

== See also ==
- Baron Ailwyn
