= William Fellowes, 2nd Baron de Ramsey =

British politician

The Right Honourable The Lord de Ramsey

Member of Parliament for Huntingdonshire
- In office 1880–1885 Serving with Lord Douglas Gordon
- Preceded by: Edward Fellowes; The Viscount Mandeville
- Succeeded by: Constituency abolished

Member of Parliament for Ramsey
- In office 1885–1887
- Preceded by: New constituency
- Succeeded by: Ailwyn Fellowes

Lord-in-waiting
- In office 1890–1892
- Prime Minister: Lord Salisbury
- Preceded by: The Viscount Torrington
- Succeeded by: The Lord Wolverton

Member of the Lords Temporal of the House of Lords as Baron de Ramsey
- In office 1887–1925
- Preceded by: Edward Fellowes, 1st Baron de Ramsey
- Succeeded by: Ailwyn Fellowes

Personal details
- Born: 16 May 1848
- Died: 8 May 1925 (aged 76)
- Party: Conservative
- Spouse: Lady Rosamond Jane Frances Spencer-Churchill (m. 1877)
- Children: 6

William Henry Fellowes, 2nd Baron de Ramsey (16 May 1848 – 8 May 1925), was a British Conservative politician.

De Ramsey was the eldest son of Edward Fellowes, 1st Baron de Ramsey, and Hon. Mary Julia Milles. Ailwyn Fellowes, 1st Baron Ailwyn, was his younger brother. He purchased a commission as a cornet in the Life Guards on 16 March 1867; he retired as a captain on 21 July 1877.

== Career ==
=== Parliament ===
He succeeded his father as Member of Parliament for Huntingdonshire in 1880, a seat he held until 1885 when the constituency was abolished, and then represented Ramsey until August 1887, when he inherited the barony on his father's death and entered the House of Lords. In 1890 de Ramsey was appointed a Lord-in-waiting (government whip in the House of Lords) in the Conservative administration of Lord Salisbury, a post he held until the Conservative defeat in the 1892 general election.

A staunch constitutional Conservative, Lord de Ramsey vigorously opposed Lloyd George’s land taxes and frequently spoke against "the perils of Socialism." As president of the Huntingdonshire Conservative Association, he was influential within the local party, notably credited with energizing the 1924 Unionist campaign by emphasizing the importance of voter turnout, famously asserting, "an election is not won until the numbers go up."

=== Estates and landholdings ===
Following his father's death in 1887, Lord de Ramsey inherited an extensive estate spanning approximately 20,021 acres across Huntingdonshire, Norfolk, and Cambridgeshire, including 15,629 acres in Huntingdonshire centred on Ramsey Abbey, 4,083 acres in Norfolk centred on Haveringland Hall, and 309 acres in Cambridgeshire. He maintained a London residence at No. 2 Grosvenor Square from 1891 to 1895, subsequently moving to 3 Belgrave Square, the former London home of his father.

He reportedly held a deep appreciation for the countryside, splitting his time primarily between Ramsey Abbey in Huntingdonshire and Haveringland Hall in Norfolk. The gardens of Ramsey Abbey were particularly notable, and Lord de Ramsey made them accessible for public enjoyment, even after becoming blind later in life. He was widely respected as a landlord by his contemporaries, known for his generosity and practical support, dedicating roughly 2,000 acres of his Ramsey Estate to smallholding agriculture and providing further land to the county council for the settlement of ex-servicemen.

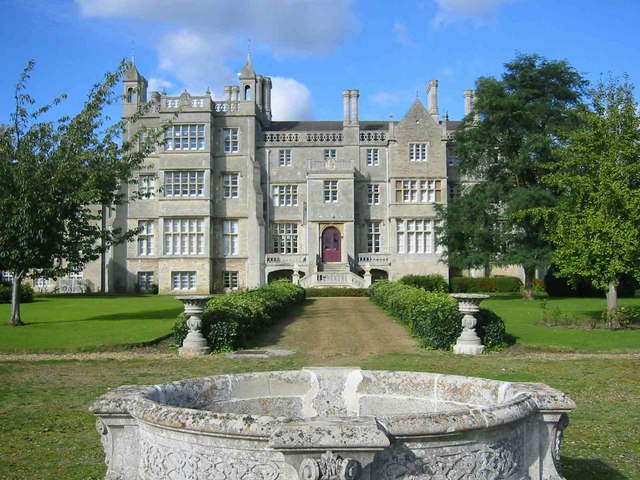
Ramsey Abbey House, remodelled in 1804–06 by Sir John Soane

Lord de Ramsey was also recognised for his extensive public service with The Fenlands Statutory Drainage Authority, serving as a commissioner from 1878, and chairman of the Middle Level Commissioners from 1889 to 1919. During his tenure, significant improvements to drainage infrastructure were made, including the installation of new sluices, resulting in the reduction of the board’s capital debt from £575,000 to £190,000. In his later life, he was regarded as an expert on Fenlands Drainage and Agricultural Practices.

== Family ==
Lord de Ramsey married The Lady Rosamond Jane Frances Spencer-Churchill, daughter of John Churchill, 7th Duke of Marlborough, in 1877. He thereby became the brother-in-law of Lord Randolph Churchill and the uncle (through marriage) of Winston Churchill.

Lady de Ramsey died in 1920. Lord de Ramsey survived her by five years and died in May 1925, aged 76. He was succeeded in the barony by his grandson Ailwyn, his son and heir apparent Captain the Hon. Coulson Churchill Fellowes having died on active service in the First World War.

- Hon. Alexandra Frances Anne Fellowes (29 June 1880 – 16 September 1955), married Brig.-Gen. Hon. Ferdinand Charles Stanley
  - Frederick Arthur Stanley (1905 - 1978)
  - John Stanley (1907 - 1964)
  - Henry Ferdinand Stanley (1911 - 1997)
- Hon. Coulson Churchill Fellowes (8 February 1883 – 22 October 1915), married first Gwendolen Dorothy Jefferson and secondly Hon. Lilah O'Brien
  - The Hon. Diana Rosamond Fellowes (1907 - 1937)
  - Ailwyn Fellowes, 3rd Baron de Ramsey (1910–1993)
  - The Hon. John David Coulson Fellowes (1915 - 1998)
- Hon. Reginald Ailwyn Fellowes (20 January 1884 – 19 March 1953), married Marguerite Séverine Philippine Decazes de Glücksberg more usually known as Daisy Fellowes
  - Rosamond Daisy Fellowes (1921 -1998)
- Hon. Gladys Cecil Georgina Fellowes (4 January 1885 – 4 August 1952), married Captain Heneage Greville Finch, Lord Guernsey
  - Heneage Michael Charles Finch, 9th Earl of Aylesford (1908 - 1940)
- Hon. Hermione Frances Caroline Fellowes (31 July 1886 – January 1972), married 1. Brig.-Gen. Lord Esmé Charles Gordon-Lennox and secondly Rolf Cederström, Baron Cederström
  - Reginald Arthur Charles Gordon-Lennox (1910 - 1965)
  - Brita Yvonne Cederström
- The Hon. Sybil Inna Mildred Fellowes (24 October 1888 – 18 May 1948), married Capt. George Butler in 1915 (later Earl of Ossory from 1919 to 1943, and 5th Marquess of Ormonde from 1943 to 1949)
  - James Anthony Butler, Viscount Thurles (1916 - 1940)
  - Lady Moyra Butler (1920 - 1959)

== Later life ==
=== First World War ===
At the outbreak of the First World War, Lord de Ramsey, then aged 66, and his second son The Hon. Reginald Fellowes, were visiting Germany. His eyesight had been progressively worsening, and he had sought treatment with a noted eye specialist in Germany. He was interned in a sanatorium as a prisoner of war for over a year due to his previous service as a soldier. While interned, he learned of the deaths of his elder son, Captain Coulson Fellowes, and his son-in-law Lord Guernsey. Upon his return to England, he immediately contributed to the war effort by converting Abbots Ripton Hall into a military hospital managed by his widowed daughter, Lady Guernsey. The sudden death of his wife in 1920 and later the death of his brother, Lord Ailwyn, in 1924 compounded the series of personal tragedies which marred his final years.

=== Death and funeral ===
Lord de Ramsey died on 8 May 1925. His funeral was held at Ramsey, with his coffin transported by a special train from London and conveyed through the town accompanied by constables and a guard of honour comprising Scouts and Guides. The Bishop of Ely officiated the service.

=== Will and succession ===
Following his death in 1925, Lord de Ramsey's unsettled estate was valued at £144,669 gross and £100,600 net. His principal properties, including Ramsey Abbey, Haveringland Hall, and the lease of 3 Belgrave Square, passed to his fifteen-year-old grandson Ailwyn Fellowes, 3rd Baron de Ramsey, who succeeded him in the family titles and honours. Each of his daughters received a substantial portion from his personal estate, amounting to £17,500 each when combined with their existing marriage settlements, while his widowed daughter-in-law, the Hon Gwendoline Dorothy Fellowes, was granted a £500 annuity.

== Notes ==
Parliament of the United Kingdom
Preceded by Edward Fellowes; Viscount Mandeville	Member of Parliament for Huntingdonshire; 1880 – 1885; With: Lord Douglas Gordon	Constituency abolished
New constituency	Member of Parliament for Ramsey; 1885 – 1887	Succeeded by Ailwyn Fellowes
Political offices
Preceded by The Viscount Torrington	Lord-in-waiting; 1890–1892	Succeeded by The Lord Wolverton
Peerage of the United Kingdom
Preceded by Edward Fellowes	Baron de Ramsey; 1887–1925	Succeeded by Ailwyn Fellowes
