= Ailwyn Fellowes, 3rd Baron de Ramsey =

British peer and Territorial soldier

Ailwyn Edward Fellowes, 3rd Baron de Ramsey KBE, TD (16 March 1910 – 31 March 1993) was a British peer and Territorial soldier.

== Early life ==
de Ramsey was the son of the Hon. Coulson Churchill Fellowes (1883–1915), son of William Fellowes, 2nd Baron de Ramsey. His mother was Gwendolene Dorothy, daughter of Harry Wyndham Jefferson. He was educated at Oundle School. His father had died while on active service in the First World War and in May 1925, aged 15, he succeeded his grandfather in the barony

== World War II ==
Commissioned as a Second lieutenant in the Territorial Army (TA) shortly before the outbreak of World War II, de Ramsay served in 86th (East Anglian) (Hertfordshire Yeomanry) Field Regiment, Royal Artillery. He was transferred to the regiment's duplicate, 135th (East Anglian) (Hertfordshire Yeomanry) Field Regiment, and was Battery Captain of its 499th Field Battery when the regiment was captured at the Fall of Singapore. de Ramsey was a Prisoner of War of the Japanese for the rest of the war. He was subsequently awarded the Territorial Decoration.

In 1956 Lady de Ramsey created a Lady Chapel at the Church of St Thomas à Becket, Ramsey, as a thanksgiving gift for the safe return of her husband from a Japanese Prisoner of War camp.

== Public life ==
In 1947 de Ramsey was appointed Lord Lieutenant of Huntingdonshire, a position that was renamed Lord Lieutenant of Huntingdon and Peterborough in 1965. He continued to hold the office until 1968. In 1974 he was made a KBE. Lord de Ramsey was entitled to a seat in the House of Lords between 1931 and 1993 and spoke 53 times during this period, mainly on water and drainage issues. His maiden speech was in August 1940 and his last speech in November 1981.

One of the family's principal residences, Haveringland Hall, Norfolk, along with its 4,290 acres, was requisitioned during the Second World War. In 1946 the Haverlingland Estate was sold, and demolished in 1947; the reasons cited for the demolition were damage during its period of requisitionment and the house being surplus to requirements.

== Family life ==
Lord de Ramsey married Lilah Helen Suzanne, daughter of Francis Anthony Labouchere, on 27 July 1937. They had four children:

- Hon. Sarah Fellowes, born 28 March 1938
- Hon. Jennifer Julia Fellowes, born 30 April 1940
- Hon. John Fellowes, born 27 February 1942
- Hon. Andrew Edward Fellowes, born 24 March 1950

Lady de Ramsey died in 1987. Lord de Ramsey survived her by six years and died in March 1993, aged 83. He was succeeded in the barony by his eldest son, John.

Honorary titles
Preceded by Granville Proby	Lord Lieutenant of Huntingdonshire; 1947–1965	Office abolished
New office	Lord Lieutenant of Huntingdon and Peterborough; 1965–1968	Succeeded by The Lord Hemingford
Peerage of the United Kingdom
Preceded by William Henry Fellowes	Baron de Ramsey; 1925–1993	Succeeded by John Ailwyn Fellowes
