= North Fellows Historic District =

Historic district in Iowa, United States

- U.S. National Register of Historic Places
- U.S. Historic district
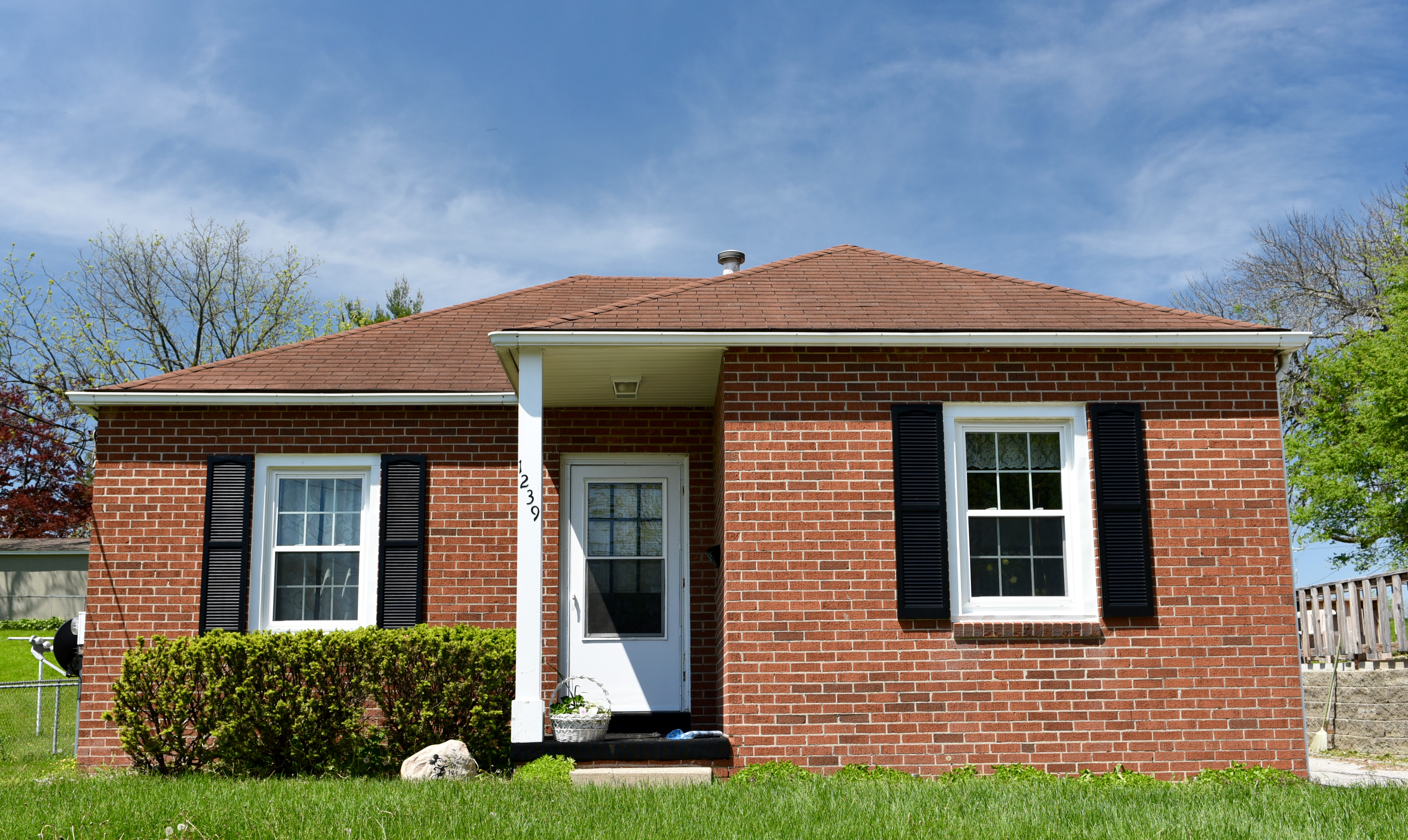

- Location within Iowa Location within the United States
- Location: 1200 block of N. Fellows St. and 1204-1212 N. Elm St. Ottumwa, Iowa
- Coordinates: 41°1′37″N 92°23′49″W
- Built: 1945-1959
- MPS: Post-World War II Development in Ottumwa, Ia 1944-1959 MPS
- NRHP reference No.: 10001087
- Added to NRHP: December 27, 2010

The North Fellows Historic District is a historic district located in Ottumwa, Iowa, United States. The city experienced a housing boom after World War II. This north side neighborhood of single-family brick homes built between 1945 and 1959 exemplifies this development. It was listed on the National Register of Historic Places in 2010.
