= Wes Fellowes =

Australian rules footballer (born 1961)

Personal information
- Born: 7 March 1961 (age 65)
- Original team: Bulleen-Templestowe
- Debut: Round 13, 1981, Collingwood vs. St Kilda

Playing career^{1}
Years	Club	Games (Goals)
1981–1989	Collingwood	102 (28)
1991–1992	Port Adelaide (SANFL)	23 (7)
- ^{1} Playing statistics correct to the end of 1992.

Career highlights
- Best and fairest 1986

Wesley 'Wes' Fellowes (born 7 March 1961) is a former Australian rules footballer who played in the Victorian Football League (VFL) and South Australian National Football Leagues (SANFL).

Originally from Bulleen-Templestowe Football Club, Fellowes was a tall ruckman and the son of former Collingwood Football Club player Graeme Fellowes. Collingwood recruited Fellowes and he made his senior VFL debut in Round 13 1981. He was a skilful and mobile ruckman, who played some consistent football after an improving start to his career, and in 1986 he won Collingwood's Best and Fairest award, the Copeland Trophy.

Fellowes finished his 102-game career at Collingwood in 1989. He played for Port Adelaide in the SANFL in 1991.
