= Graeme Fellowes =

Australian rules footballer

Personal information
- Born: 29 January 1934
- Died: 24 January 2013 (aged 78)
- Original team: Maffra
- Debut: Round 14, 1956, Collingwood vs. Richmond, at Victoria Park
- Height: 200 cm (6 ft 7 in)
- Weight: 99 kg (218 lb)

Playing career^{1}
Years	Club	Games (Goals)
1956–1964	Collingwood	66 (22)
- ^{1} Playing statistics correct to the end of 1964.

Graeme Fellowes (29 January 1934 – 24 January 2013) was a professional Australian rules footballer who played for Collingwood in the Victorian Football League (VFL) during the late 1950s and early 1960s.

After managing just eight games in his first three home and away seasons, Fellowes burst onto the scene in the 1958 finals series. He came on the field in the Semi Final against Melbourne Football Club as 19th man and the tall and lanky ruckman dominated, cementing his spot in the side for the rest of September including the 1958 premiership.

Fellowes was a regular for the following two seasons before his knee began to fail him, eventually ending his career in 1964.

His son Wes also played for Collingwood, winning the club Best and Fairest in 1986.

Fellowes died on 24 January 2013. On 6 March 2013, it was reported that his football memorabilia had been stolen.
