= Haveringland Hall, Norfolk =

Haveringland Hall
- Haveringland Hall, c.1936

- Location within Norfolk

General information
- Status: Demolished
- Type: Country house
- Architectural style: Italianate
- Location: Haveringland, Norfolk, England
- Coordinates: 52°44′N 1°10′E
- Construction started: 1839
- Completed: 1843
- Demolished: 1947
- Client: Edward Fellowes (later 1st Baron de Ramsey)

Technical details
- Material: Bath stone
- Floor count: 3

Design and construction
- Architect: Edward Blore

Haveringland Hall was an Italianate country house at Haveringland in the English county of Norfolk. Built 1839–1843 for Edward Fellowes, later 1st Baron de Ramsey, it was demolished in 1947 after wartime damage rendered it surplus to requirements. The stable courtyard with its clock-tower survives and is listed at Grade II.

== Earlier houses ==
The earliest recorded house was a medieval moated manor owned by Sir Thomas Hyrne in 1580. About 1674 William Fellowes built a new hall 0.5 mi (0.8 km) north of the moat, laying out formal gardens between the two sites. Plans of 1674 and 1807, and a tithe map of 1738, show a two-storey mansion with mansard roofs and shallow projecting wings overlooking an artificial lake. William Henry Fellowes occupied this second hall until his death in 1837; his son Edward demolished it in 1840.

== Third hall ==
In 1839 Edward Fellowes engaged architect Edward Blore to design a new house on higher ground north of the lakes. Completed in 1843 and faced in Bath stone, the three-storey building featured corner attics, an observatory tower and roughly forty bedrooms. A clock-tower gateway—its mechanism said to match those at Buckingham Palace—formed the main approach.

=== Ownership by the Barons de Ramsey ===
- Edward Fellowes was created Baron de Ramsey in 1887 but died one month later.
- His son William Fellowes, 2nd Baron de Ramsey, divided his year between Ramsey Abbey (summer) and Haveringland Hall (winter).
- The estate passed in 1925 to his grandson Ailwyn Fellowes, 3rd Baron de Ramsey. When he came of age in 1931 the trustees moved the family seat to Abbots Ripton Hall, leaving Haveringland largely unoccupied.

The House continued to be occupied occasionally by members of the Fellowes Family during the 1930s. The Hall was the site of the Wedding Reception of The Hon Diana Fellowes (sister of the 3rd Baron de Ramsey) in June 1932.

In May 1939 newspapers report that one of the 2nd Baron de Ramsey's daughters, Hermione, Baroness Cederstrom was in residence, and hosted a visit by her younger sister Sybil Butler, Countess of Ossory and her husband George Butler, Earl of Ossory.

== 1940s: Vacancy, requisition and demolition ==
In February 1940 the agents Knight, Frank & Rutley advertised Haveringland Hall, described as "enlarged and brought up to date" to be let with 26 acres of immediate grounds—or, if desired, with the sporting rights over the entire 4,267-acre estate. The Italian-style mansion was promoted for its large lake offering coarse fishing, while the estate's game books recorded average annual bags of 1,240 pheasants and about 700 partridges (plus wild-fowl shooting) over the preceding five seasons.

During the Second World War the grounds were requisitioned for RAF Swannington; the hall served as the officers’ mess from 1944. A well-known photograph shows five B-24 Liberators of the 445th Bomb Group flying over the house.

=== Sale ===
In November 1946 the 4,290-acre Haveringland Estate—including Haveringland Hall (then still requisitioned), 131 acres of parkland with its fishing lake, fifteen tenant farms, seventy-two houses and cottages, and two licensed public houses—was advertised for auction at Norwich on 30 November.

== Demolition and legacy ==
Following the RAF's departure, the damaged house was demolished in 1947. Advertisements placed in November 1948 offered "valuable building materials" from Haveringland Hall for sale, signalling the final clearance of the house after demolition. Only foundations, cellars and an ice-house remain. The red-brick stable block with its clock-tower, and two lodge cottages on the west drive, survive in private use and the stables are Grade II listed.

== See also ==
- Destruction of country houses in 20th-century Britain
