= Carol Fellowes, 4th Baron Ailwyn =

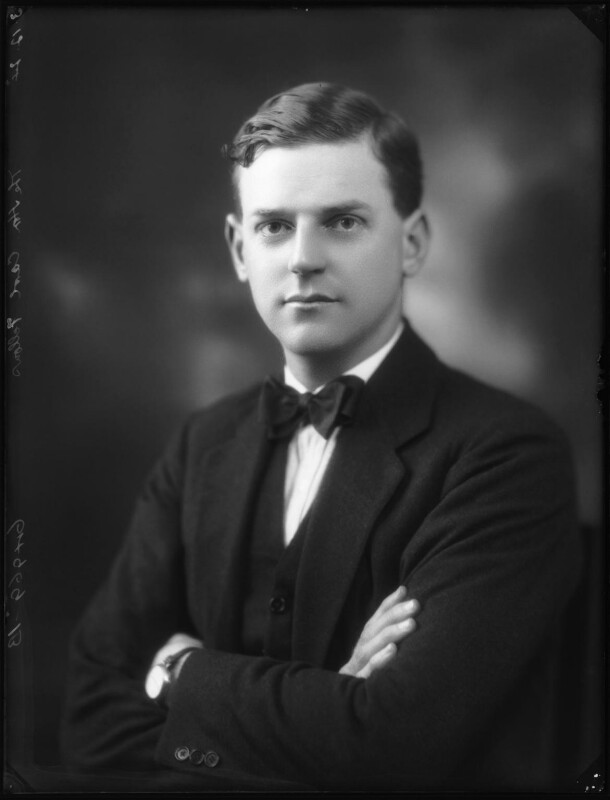
Fellowes in 1924

Carol Arthur Fellowes, 4th Baron Ailwyn TD (23 November 1896 – 27 September 1988) was a British peer, the son of Ailwyn Edward Fellowes, 1st Baron Ailwyn. He was known as the Honourable Carol Fellowes from 1921, when his father was raised to the peerage, until he succeeded to the barony on 23 March 1976.

== Early life ==
Carol Fellowes was educated at the Royal Naval Colleges at Osborne and Dartmouth. However, he entered the British Army during World War I.

In the 1930s he worked as agent to the Earl of Strafford on the Wrotham Park Estate, living at the Home Farm.

== Military career ==
During World War I Carol Fellowes served as a lieutenant in the Royal Norfolk Regiment in Mesopotamia (1917–19). In 1937 he was commissioned as a major in the Territorial Army to command the newly raised 334th Anti-Aircraft Company, Royal Engineers, at Barnet. The company formed part of 33rd (St Pancras) Anti-Aircraft Battalion based at Regent's Park. He commanded of the battery during the Phoney War period, and was then posted to the staff of Anti-Aircraft Command for the rest of the war. He was awarded the Territorial Decoration.

== Public service ==
He served as a Justice of the Peace for Hertfordshire and Middlesex.

== Family ==
Carol Fellowes married, on 16 November 1936, Mrs Caroline Alice Cudemore (d.1985), daughter of Maynard Cowan of Victoria, British Columbia.

Lord Ailwyn died, without issue, on 27 September 1988, at which point the barony became extinct.

== Arms ==
Coat of arms of Carol Fellowes, 4th Baron Ailwyn

Crest
A lion's head as in the arms charged with a fess dancetty Ermine.
Escutcheon
Azure a fess dancetty Ermine between three lions' heads erased Or murally crowned Argent a crescent for difference.
Supporters
On either side a lynx Argent spotted Sable ducally gorged and chained Or pendant from the coronet an escutcheon Ermine charged with a ram's eye Proper.
Motto
Patientia Et Perseverantia Cum Magnaninitate (Patience And Perseverance With Magnanimity

== Notes ==
Peerage of the United Kingdom
Preceded by Eric Fellowes	Baron Ailwyn; 1976–1988	Extinct
