= Ronald Fellowes, 2nd Baron Ailwyn =

British soldier and peer (1886–1936)

Lt.-Col. Ronald Townshend Fellowes, 2nd Baron Ailwyn DSO MC (7 December 1886 – 30 August 1936) was a British peer, the son of Ailwyn Edward Fellowes, 1st Baron Ailwyn. He succeeded to the Barony on 23 September 1924. He lived at Honingham Hall in Norfolk until he sold it in 1935.

He married Mildred King on 21 August 1916.

He died, without issue, on 30 August 1936 at age 49, from wounds received in the First World War.

== Arms ==
Coat of arms of Ronald Fellowes, 2nd Baron Ailwyn

Crest
A lion's head as in the arms charged with a fess dancetty Ermine.
Escutcheon
Azure a fess dancetty Ermine between three lions' heads erased Or murally crowned Argent a crescent for difference.
Supporters
On either side a lynx Argent spotted Sable ducally gorged and chained Or pendant from the coronet an escutcheon Ermine charged with a ram's eye Proper.
Motto
Patientia Et Perseverantia Cum Magnaninitate (Patience And Perseverance With Magnanimity

Peerage of the United Kingdom
Preceded by Ailwyn Fellowes	Baron Ailwyn; 1924–1936	Succeeded by Edward Fellowes
