= Justice Fellows =

Justice Fellows may refer to:

- Grant Fellows (1865–1929), associate justice of the Michigan Supreme Court
- Raymond Fellows (1885–1957), associate justice of the Maine Supreme Judicial Court
