= Haveringland =

Village in Norfolk, England

Coordinates: 52.73983°N 1.19374°E

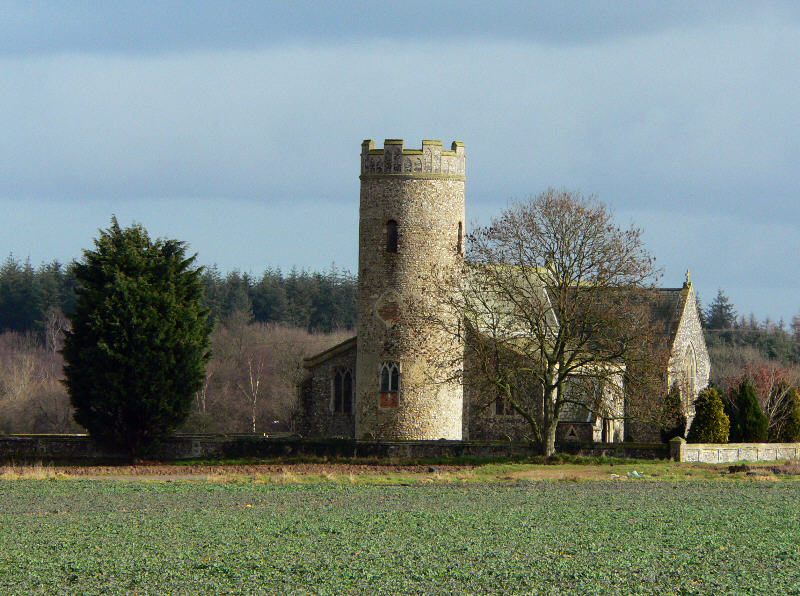
- St. Peter's Church

- Location within Norfolk
- Area: 4.65 sq mi (12.0 km^{2})
- Population: 365 (2021 census)
  - Density: 78/sq mi (30/km^{2})
- OS grid reference: TG156205
- Civil parish: Haveringland
- District: Broadland
- Shire county: Norfolk
- Region: East
- Country: England
- Sovereign state: United Kingdom
- Post town: NORWICH
- Postcode district: NR10
- Dialling code: 01603
- UK Parliament: Broadland and Fakenham

Haveringland is a village and civil parish in the English county of Norfolk.

Haveringland is located 5 miles (8.0 km) south of Aylsham and 8.1 miles (13.0 km) north-west of Norwich.

== Correct pronunciation ==
"Haverland"

== History ==
Haveringland's name is of Anglo-Saxon origin and derives from the Old English for the land of Haefer's people.

In the Domesday Book, Haveringland is listed as a settlement of 22 households hundred of Eynesford. In 1086, the village was part of the East Anglian estates of Reginald, son of Ivo.

In the Twelfth Century, a Augustinian Priory was founded in Haveringland, named for William of Norwich. There are no ruins of the Priory today.

A pillory dating from 1804 still stands in the village. The Parish was also the location Haveringland Hall, Norfolk, built for Edward Fellowes, 1st Baron de Ramsey between 1839 and 1843. The House was requisitioned during the Second World War, and parts of RAF Swannington were built in the parish which was used by No. 100 Group RAF. Following the end of the War Haveringland Hall was demolished in 1947.

== Geography ==
According to the 2021 census, Haveringland has a population of 365 people which shows a decrease from the 283 people recorded in the 2011 census.

== St. Peter's Church ==
Haveringland's parish church is dedicated to Saint Peter and is one of Norfolk's 124 remaining round-tower churches. St. Peter's has been Grade II listed since 1961. St. Peter's holds intermittent church services throughout the year.

== Governance ==
Haveringland is part of the electoral ward of Great Witchingham for local elections and is part of the district of Broadland.

The village's national constituency is Broadland and Fakenham which has been represented by the Conservative Party's Jerome Mayhew MP since 2019.

== War Memorial ==
Haveringland's war memorial is a brass plaque inside St. Peter's Church which lists the following names for the First World War:

Rank	Name	Unit	Date of death	Burial/Commemoration
Pte.	John S. Rust	8th Bn., Norfolk Regiment	19 Jul. 1916	Thiepval Memorial
Pte.	George Plunkett	9th Bn., Norfolk Regt.	28 Apr. 1917	St. Patrick's Cemetery
Pte.	William G. Wilkinson	9th Bn., Norfolk Regt.	25 Dec. 1915	New Irish Farm Cemetery
