= John Fellowes, 4th Baron de Ramsey =

British landowner and agriculturalist

John Ailwyn Fellowes, 4th Baron de Ramsey, DL (born 27 February 1942), is a British landowner, agriculturalist, and the first chairman of the Environment Agency.

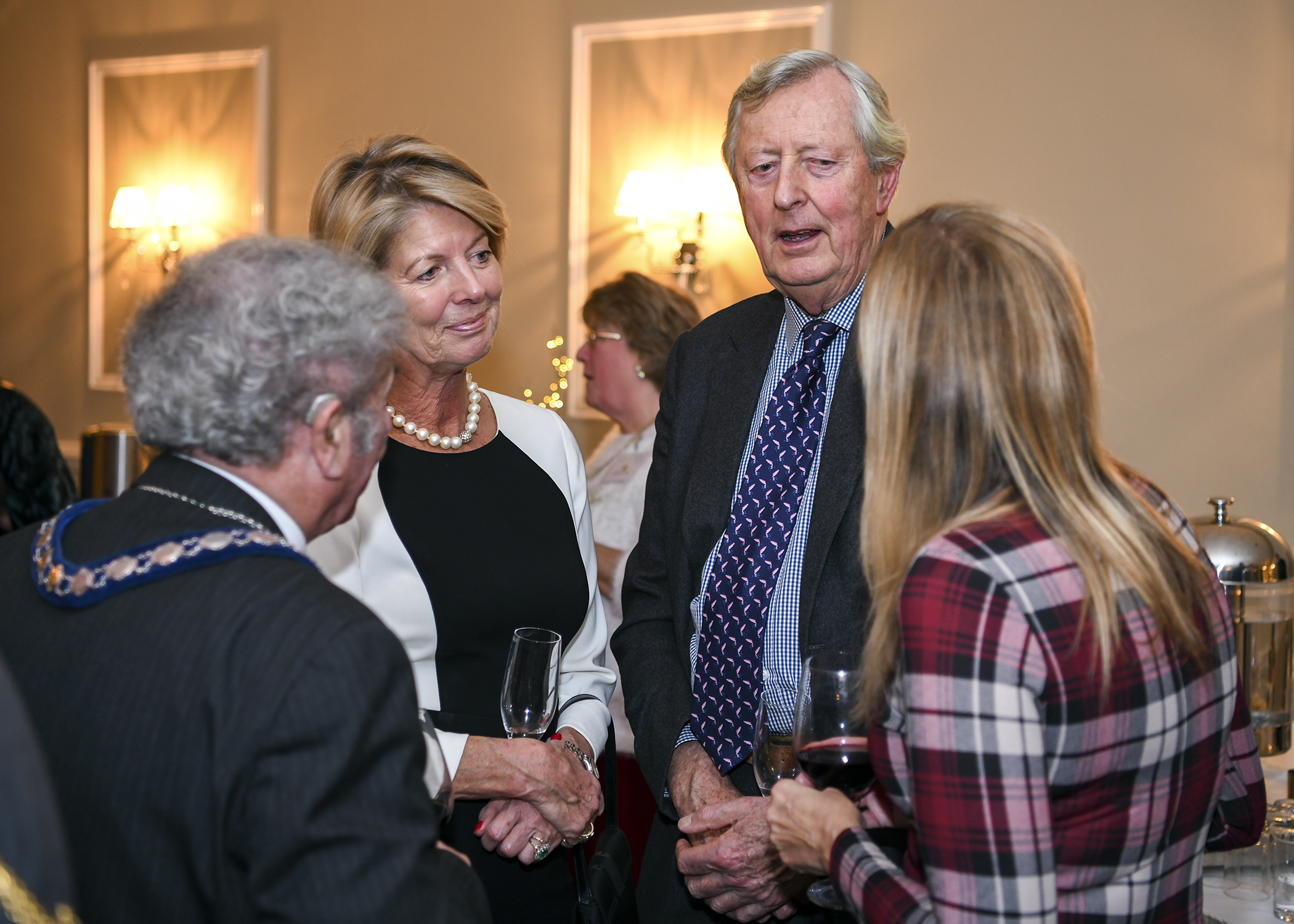
in 2019

== Career ==
Lord de Ramsey farms the family's 6,000 acre estate around the village of Abbots Ripton, Huntingdonshire.

He has a longstanding interest in fenland drainage, acting as a commissioner for the Middle Level Commissioners, president of the Association of Drainage Authorities 1991–1994 and 2001–present, and a director of the Cambridge Water Company from 1974 to 1994.

He was president of the Country Landowners Association (1991–1993), a Crown Estate commissioner 1994–2002, and president of the Royal Agricultural Society of England 2002–2003.

Other roles include Chairman of the Cambridgeshire Farmers Union (1982), Director of the Shuttleworth Trust (1982–1995), Member of the Governing Body of the Institute of Plant Science Research (1984–1989), Director of Strutt and Parker (Farms) Limited (from 1993), and Director of the Lawes Agricultural Trust (from 1996). He is chairman of the Lawes Trust which owns the estate on which Rothamsted Research is based.

In 1995, Lord de Ramsey became the first chairman of the Environment Agency.

== Family and personal life ==
John Ailwyn Fellowes was born in 1942, the elder son of Ailwyn Fellowes, 3rd Baron de Ramsey. He was educated at Maidwell Hall, Northampton, Winchester College and Writtle Institute of Agriculture.

In 1973 he married Phylida Forsyth. They had one son:

- Hon. Freddie John Fellowes (born 31 May 1978), who as Fred Fellowes runs the Secret Garden Party music festival each year.

He married secondly Alison Birkmyre, daughter of Sir Archibald Birkmyre, 3rd Baronet, in 1984. The couple has three children:

- Hon. Charles Henry Fellowes, b. 1986
- Hon. Daisy Lilah Fellowes, b. 1988
- Hon. Flora Mary Fellowes, b. 1991

The family lives at Abbots Ripton Hall, Huntingdonshire.

In 1997, Lord de Ramsey was awarded an honorary degree of Doctor of Science from the School of Agriculture, Food and Environment of Cranfield University.

Peerage of the United Kingdom
Preceded by Ailwyn Fellowes	Baron de Ramsey; 1993–present Member of the House of Lords (1993–1999)	Incumbent; Heor apparent: Hon. Freddie Fellowes
