= Eric Fellowes, 3rd Baron Ailwyn =

British peer (1887–1976)

Lord Ailwyn in March 1945.

Captain Eric William Edward Fellowes, 3rd Baron Ailwyn (24 November 1887 – 23 March 1976) was a British peer, the son of Ailwyn Edward Fellowes, 1st Baron Ailwyn. He succeeded to the Barony on 30 August 1936.

Fellows was educated at Stubbington House School and at HMS Britannia. He married Cecil Lorna Barclay (d.1976), on 5 June 1935.

In 1942, he was a member of British Parliamentary Mission to China, and from 1943 to 1948 he was President of the China Association.

He died, without issue, on 23 March 1976.

== Arms ==
Coat of arms of Eric Fellowes, 3rd Baron Ailwyn

Crest
A lion's head as in the arms charged with a fess dancetty Ermine.
Escutcheon
Azure a fess dancetty Ermine between three lions' heads erased Or murally crowned Argent a crescent for difference.
Supporters
On either side a lynx Argent spotted Sable ducally gorged and chained Or pendant from the coronet an escutcheon Ermine charged with a ram's eye Proper.
Motto
Patientia Et Perseverantia Cum Magnaninitate (Patience And Perseverance With Magnanimity

Peerage of the United Kingdom
Preceded by Ronald Fellowes	Baron Ailwyn; 1936–1976	Succeeded by Carol Fellowes
