= List of Collingwood Football Club seasons =

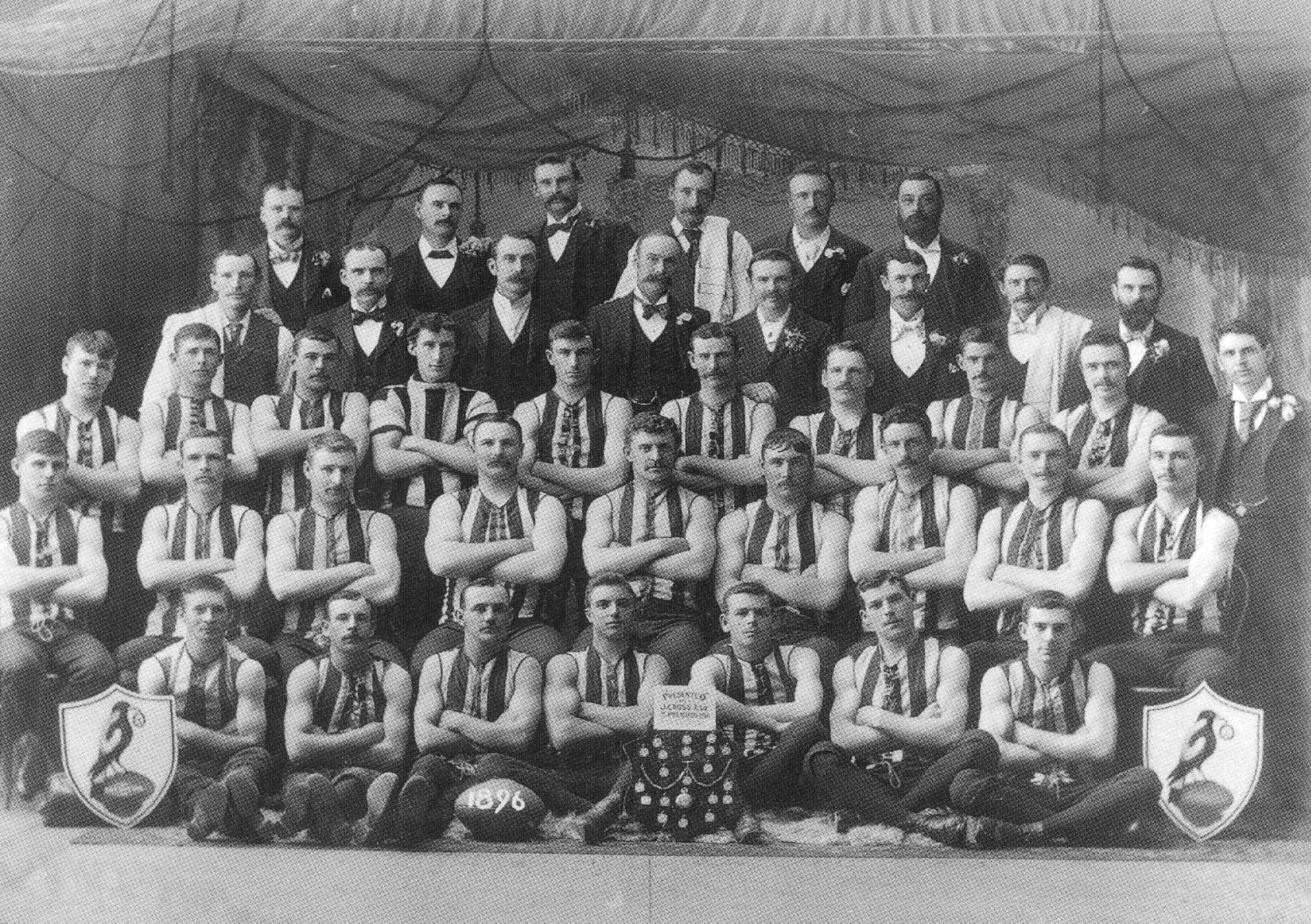
The Collingwood team that won the VFA premiership in 1896

The Collingwood Football Club is a professional Australian rules football club based in Melbourne, Victoria, that competes in the Australian Football League (AFL), the sport's elite competition. Founded in 1892, the club played five seasons in the Victorian Football Association (VFA), winning one premiership in 1896. The club then became a foundation member of the VFL in 1897, where it has competed in every season since, winning 16 VFL/AFL premierships in the process.

== Seasons ==
Season	Competition	H&A	Finals	W	L	D	Finals matches	Copeland Trophy	Name	Goals	Captain	Coach	Ref
Season	Competition	H&A	Finals	W	L	D	Finals matches	Copeland Trophy	Leading Goalkicker		Captain	Coach	Ref
1892	1892 VFA season	12th	—	3	14	0	—	—	George P. Anderson Archie Smith	12	Joe Delahunty	—	
1893	1893 VFA season	9th	—	7	10	2	—	—	George P. Anderson (2)	20	Bill Strickland	—	
1894	1894 VFA season	8th	—	8	9	1	—	—	Archie Smith (2)	25	Bill Strickland	—	
1895	1895 VFA season	4th	—	12	4	2	—	—	Archie Smith (3)	27	Bill Strickland	—	
1896	1896 VFA season	1st	Premiers	14	3	1	Won Playoff Match against South Melbourne 6–5	—	Wal Gillard	13	Bill Strickland	—	
1897	1897 VFL season	4th	3rd	9	5	0	Won Round 1 against Melbourne 51–37; Lost Round 2 to Essendon 70–30; Lost Round 3 to Geelong 52–48	—	Archie Smith (4)	15	Bill Strickland	—	
1898	1898 VFL season	2nd	Preliminary Final	13	4	0	Lost Preliminary Final to Fitzroy 22–11	—	Archie Smith (5)	31	Bill Proudfoot	—	
1899	1899 VFL season	3rd	—	12	5	0	—	—	Archie Smith (6)	17	Bill Proudfoot	—	
1900	1900 VFL season	4th	—	10	7	0	—	—	Archie Smith (7)	21	Dick Condon	—	
1901	1901 VFL season	3rd	Runners-up	12	5	0	Won Semi Final against Geelong 45–24; Lost Grand Final to Essendon 43–16	—	Ted Rowell	31	Dick Condon	—	
1902	1902 VFL season	1st	Premiers	15	2	0	Lost Semi Final to Fitzroy 64–48; Won Grand Final against Essendon 60–27	—	Ted Rowell (2)	33	Bill Proudfoot	—	
1903	1903 VFL season	1st	Premiers	15	2	0	Won Semi Final against Carlton 27–23; Won Grand Final against Fitzroy 31–29	—	Teddy Lockwood	35	Lardie Tulloch	—	
1904	1904 VFL season	3rd	Semi Final	10	7	0	Lost Semi Final to Fitzroy 61–50	—	Charlie Pannam	24	Lardie Tulloch	Bill Strickland	
1905	1905 VFL season	1st	Runners-up	15	2	0	Lost Semi Final to Carlton 76–30; Lost Grand Final to Fitzroy 30–17	—	Charlie Pannam (2)	38	Lardie Tulloch	Dick Condon	
1906	1906 VFL season	3rd	Semi Final	11	6	0	Lost Semi Final to Carlton 64–54	—	Dick Lee	35	Charlie Pannam	Dick Condon	
1907	1907 VFL season	4th	Semi Final	9	8	0	Lost Semi Final to South Melbourne 82–48	—	Dick Lee (2)	47	Alf Dummett	Ted Rowell	
1908	1908 VFL season	4th	Semi Final	10	8	0	Lost Semi Final to Essendon 68–33	—	Dick Lee (3)	54	Arthur Leach	Ted Rowell	
1909	1909 VFL season	3rd	Semi Final	12	4	2	Lost Semi Final to South Melbourne 68–47	—	Dick Lee (4)	58	Arthur Leach	Bill Strickland	
1910	1910 VFL season	2nd	Premiers	13	5	0	Won Semi Final against Essendon 95–37; Won Preliminary Final against South Melbourne 55–44; Won Grand Final against Carlton 61–47	—	Dick Lee (5)	58	George Angus	George Angus	
1911	1911 VFL season	4th	Runners-up	12	6	0	Won Semi Final against South Melbourne 77–47; Lost Grand Final to Essendon 41–35	—	Tom Baxter	31	George Angus	George Angus	
1912	1912 VFL season	7th	—	9	9	0	—	—	Les Hughes	13	Jock McHale	George Angus	
1913	1913 VFL season	3rd	Semi Final	13	5	0	Lost Semi Final to Fitzroy 80–43	—	Les Hughes (2)	22	Jock McHale	Jock McHale	
1914	1914 VFL season	5th	—	10	7	1	—	—	Dick Lee (6)	57	Dan Minogue	Jock McHale	
1915	1915 VFL season	1st	Runners-up	14	2	0	Lost Semi Final to Fitzroy 70–36; Lost Grand Final to Carlton 78–45	—	Dick Lee (7)	66	Dan Minogue	Jock McHale	
1916	1916 VFL season	2nd	Semi Final	6	5	1	Lost Semi Final to Fitzroy 63–57	—	Dick Lee (8)	48	Dan Minogue	Jock McHale	
1917	1917 VFL season	1st	Premiers	10	4	1	Won Semi Final against South Melbourne 95–35; Lost Preliminary Final to Fitzroy 58–52; Won Grand Final against Fitzroy 74–39	—	Dick Lee (9)	54	Percy Wilson	Jock McHale	
1918	1918 VFL season	2nd	Runners-up	10	4	0	Won Semi Final against St Kilda 58–49; Lost Grand Final to South Melbourne 62–57	—	Tom Wraith	26	Percy Wilson	Jock McHale	
1919	1919 VFL season	1st	Premiers	13	3	0	Won Semi Final against Carlton 64–46; Lost Preliminary Final to Richmond 74–45; Won Grand Final against Richmond 78–53	—	Dick Lee (10)	56	Con McCarthy	Jock McHale	
1920	1920 VFL season	4th	Runners-up	10	6	0	Won Semi Final against Fitzroy 41–23; Won Preliminary Final to Carlton 83–59; Lost Grand Final against Richmond 52–35	—	Ern Utting	23	Dick Lee	Jock McHale	
1921	1921 VFL season	3rd	Semi Final	9	7	0	Lost Semi Final to Carlton 65–52	—	Dick Lee (11)	64	Dick Lee	Jock McHale	
1922	1922 VFL season	1st	Runners-up	12	4	0	Lost Semi Final to Fitzroy 46–42; Lost Grand Final to Fitzroy 79–68	—	Gordon Coventry	42	Tom Drummond	Jock McHale	
1923	1923 VFL season	5th	—	8	7	1	—	—	Gordon Coventry (2)	36	Harry Curtis	Jock McHale	
1924	1924 VFL season	6th	—	8	8	0	—	—	Gordon Coventry (3)	28	Charlie Tyson	Jock McHale	
1925	1925 VFL season	4th	Runners-up	12	5	0	Won Semi Final against Essendon 78–68; Won Preliminary Final to Melbourne 63–26; Lost Grand Final against Geelong 79–69	—	Gordon Coventry (4)	68	Charlie Tyson	Jock McHale	
1926	1926 VFL season	1st	Runners-up	15	3	0	Lost Semi Final to Melbourne 95–84; Lost Grand Final to Melbourne 119–62	—	Gordon Coventry (5)	83	Charlie Tyson	Jock McHale	
1927	1927 VFL season	1st	Premiers	15	3	0	Won Semi Final against Geelong 114–48; Won Grand Final against Richmond 25–13	Syd Coventry	Gordon Coventry (6)	97	Syd Coventry	Jock McHale	
1928	1928 VFL season	1st	Premiers	15	3	0	Drew Semi Final with Melbourne 62–62; Won Semi Final Replay against Melbourne 68–64; Won Grand Final against Richmond 25–13	Harry Collier	Gordon Coventry (7)	89	Syd Coventry	Jock McHale	
1929	1929 VFL season	1st	Premiers	18	0	0	Lost Semi Final to Richmond 123–61; Won Grand Final against Richmond 79–50	Albert Collier	Gordon Coventry (8)	124	Syd Coventry	Jock McHale	
1930	1930 VFL season	1st	Premiers	15	3	0	Won Semi Final against Richmond 94–91; Lost Preliminary Final to Geelong 91–65; Won Grand Final against Geelong 100–70	Harry Collier (2)	Gordon Coventry (9)	118	Syd Coventry	Jock McHale	
1931	1931 VFL season	4th	Semi Final	12	6	0	Lost Semi Final to Carlton 130–42	Harold Rumney	Gordon Coventry (10)	67	Syd Coventry	Jock McHale	
1932	1932 VFL season	3rd	Preliminary Final	14	4	0	Won Semi Final against South Melbourne 114–88; Lost Preliminary Final to Carlton 157–82	Syd Coventry (2)	Gordon Coventry (11)	82	Syd Coventry	Jock McHale	
1933	1933 VFL season	6th	—	11	7	0	—	Gordon Coventry	Gordon Coventry (12)	108	Syd Coventry	Jock McHale	
1934	1934 VFL season	4th	Semi Final	13	4	1	Lost Semi Final to South Melbourne 78–75	Albert Collier (2)	Gordon Coventry (13)	105	Syd Coventry	Jock McHale	
1935	1935 VFL season	2nd	Premiers	14	2	2	Lost Semi Final to South Melbourne 104–83; Won Preliminary Final against Richmond 94–66; Won Grand Final against South Melbourne 78–58	Albert Collier (3)	Gordon Coventry (14)	88	Harry Collier	Jock McHale	
1936	1936 VFL season	2nd	Premiers	15	3	0	Won Semi Final against South Melbourne 90–77; Won Grand Final against South Melbourne 89–78	Jack Regan	Gordon Coventry (15)	60	Harry Collier	Jock McHale	
1937	1937 VFL season	3rd	Runners-up	13	5	0	Won Semi Final against Richmond 120–69; Won Preliminary Final against Melbourne 107–52; Lost Grand Final to Geelong 122–90	Des Fothergill	Gordon Coventry (16)	72	Harry Collier	Jock McHale	
1938	1938 VFL season	4th	Runners-up	12	6	0	Won Semi Final against Footscray 117–76; Won Preliminary Final against Geelong 135–98; Lost Grand Final to Carlton 100–85	Des Fothergill (2)	Ron Todd	120	Harry Collier	Jock McHale	
1939	1939 VFL season	2nd	Runners-up	15	3	0	Lost Semi Final to Melbourne 104–90; Won Preliminary Final against St Kilda 134–105; Lost Grand Final to Melbourne 148–95	Marcus Whelan	Ron Todd (2)	121	Harry Collier	Jock McHale	
1940	1940 VFL season	8th	—	8	10	0	—	Des Fothergill (3)	Des Fothergill	56	Jack Regan	Jock McHale	
1941	1941 VFL season	5th	—	12	6	0	—	Jack Murphy	Alby Pannam	42	Jack Regan	Jock McHale	
1942	1942 VFL season	10th	—	2	12	0	—	Alby Pannam	Alby Pannam (2)	37	Phonse Kyne	Jock McHale	
1943	1943 VFL season	10th	—	5	15	0	—	—	Alby Pannam (3)	40	Jack Regan	Jock McHale	
1944	1944 VFL season	10th	—	7	11	0	—	—	Bob Galbally Lou Richards	26	Pat Fricker	Jock McHale	
1945	1945 VFL season	2nd	Preliminary Final	15	5	0	Lost Semi Final to South Melbourne 88–77; Lost Preliminary Final to Carlton 90–80	—	Des Fothergill (2)	62	Alby Pannam	Jock McHale	
1946	1946 VFL season	2nd	Preliminary Final	13	6	0	Drew Semi Final against Essendon 100–100; Lost Semi Final Replay against Essendon 76–57; Lost Preliminary Final to Melbourne 113–100	Phonse Kyne	Des Fothergill (3)	63	Phonse Kyne	Jock McHale	
1947	1947 VFL season	5th	—	11	7	1	—	Phonse Kyne (2)	Neil Mann	48	Phonse Kyne	Jock McHale	
1948	1948 VFL season	3rd	Preliminary Final	13	6	0	Won Semi Final against Footscray 119–84; Lost Semi Final to Melbourne 166–101	Phonse Kyne (3)	Lou Richards (2)	44	Phonse Kyne	Jock McHale	
1949	1949 VFL season	3rd	Semi Final	13	6	0	Lost Semi Final to Essendon 136–54	Bob Rose	Jack Pimm	34	Phonse Kyne	Jock McHale	
1950	1950 VFL season	7th	—	9	9	0	—	Charlie Utting	Lou Richards (3)	35	Gordon Hocking	Phonse Kyne	
1951	1951 VFL season	2nd	Preliminary Final	14	4	0	Lost Semi Final to Geelong 152–70; Lost Preliminary Final to Essendon 70–68	Bob Rose (2)	Maurie Dunstan	40	Gordon Hocking	Phonse Kyne	
1952	1952 VFL season	2nd	Runners-up	14	5	0	Lost Semi Final to Geelong 100–46; Won Preliminary Final against Fitzroy 81–62; Lost Grand Final to Geelong 86–40	Bob Rose (3)	Maurie Dunstan (2)	43	Lou Richards	Phonse Kyne	
1953	1953 VFL season	2nd	Premiers	14	4	0	Won Semi Final against Geelong 90–60; Won Grand Final against Geelong 77–65	Bob Rose (4)	Bob Rose	36	Lou Richards	Phonse Kyne	
1954	1954 VFL season	7th	—	10	8	0	—	Neil Mann	Keith Bromage	22	Lou Richards	Phonse Kyne	
1955	1955 VFL season	2nd	Runners-up	14	4	0	Lost Semi Final to Melbourne 56–45; Won Preliminary Final against Geelong 96–84; Lost Grand Final to Melbourne 64–36	Des Healey	Ken Smale	47	Lou Richards	Phonse Kyne	
1956	1956 VFL season	2nd	Runners-up	13	5	0	Lost Semi Final to Melbourne 80–64; Won Preliminary Final against Footscray 96–57; Lost Grand Final to Melbourne 121–48	Bill Twomey Jr.	Ken Smale (2)	33	Neil Mann	Phonse Kyne	
1957	1957 VFL season	5th	—	9	8	1	—	Murray Weideman	Ian Brewer	26	Bill Twomey Jr.	Phonse Kyne	
1958	1958 VFL season	2nd	Premiers	12	6	0	Lost Semi Final to Melbourne 78–33; Won Preliminary Final against North Melbourne 96–76; Won Grand Final against Melbourne 82–64	Thorold Merrett	Ian Brewer (2)	73	Frank Tuck	Phonse Kyne	
1959	1959 VFL season	3rd	Semi Final	12	6	0	Lost Semi Final to Essendon 100–62	Thorold Merrett (2)	Murray Weideman	36	Frank Tuck	Phonse Kyne	
1960	1960 VFL season	4th	Runners-up	11	7	0	Won Semi Final against Essendon 66–57; Won Preliminary Final against Fitzroy 65–60; Lost Grand Final to Melbourne 62–14	Ray Gabelich	Murray Weideman (2)	30	Murray Weideman	Phonse Kyne	
1961	1961 VFL season	9th	—	5	12	1	—	Murray Weideman (2)	Kevin Pay	31	Murray Weideman	Phonse Kyne	
1962	1962 VFL season	7th	—	9	9	0	—	Murray Weideman (3)	Murray Weideman (3)	48	Murray Weideman	Phonse Kyne	
1963	1963 VFL season	8th	—	7	11	0	—	Des Tuddenham	Terry Waters	50	Murray Weideman	Phonse Kyne	
1964	1964 VFL season	2nd	Runners-up	13	4	1	Lost Semi Final to Melbourne 134–45; Won Preliminary Final against Geelong 48–44; Lost Grand Final to Melbourne 64–60	Ian Graham	Ian Graham Terry Waters (2)	42	Ray Gabelich	Phonse Kyne	
1965	1965 VFL season	2nd	Preliminary Final	13	5	0	Lost Semi Final to St Kilda 102–101; Lost Preliminary Final to Essendon 97–42	Trevor Steer	David Norman	32	Ray Gabelich	Bob Rose	
1966	1966 VFL season	1st	Runners-up	15	3	0	Won Semi Final against St Kilda 99–89; Lost Grand Final to St Kilda 74–73	Terry Waters	Ian Graham (2)	58	Des Tuddenham	Bob Rose	
1967	1967 VFL season	4th	Semi Final	12	6	0	Lost Semi Final to Geelong 108–78	Len Thompson	Peter McKenna	47	Des Tuddenham	Bob Rose	
1968	1968 VFL season	7th	—	9	11	0	—	Len Thompson (2)	Peter McKenna (2)	64	Des Tuddenham	Bob Rose	
1969	1969 VFL season	1st	Preliminary Final	15	5	0	Lost Semi Final to Carlton 107–71; Lost Preliminary Final to Richmond 107–81	Barry Price	Peter McKenna (3)	98	Des Tuddenham	Bob Rose	
1970	1970 VFL season	1st	Runners-up	18	4	0	Won Semi Final against Carlton 118–108; Lost Grand Final to Carlton 111–101	Peter McKenna	Peter McKenna (4)	143	Terry Waters	Bob Rose	
1971	1971 VFL season	4th	Semi Final	14	7	1	Lost Semi Final to Richmond 121–77	Wayne Richardson	Peter McKenna (5)	134	Terry Waters	Bob Rose	
1972	1972 VFL season	3rd	Semi Final	14	7	1	Lost Qualifying Final to Richmond 164–120; Lost Semi Final to St Kilda 83–65	Len Thompson (3)	Peter McKenna (6)	130	Wayne Richardson	Neil Mann	
1973	1973 VFL season	1st	Preliminary Final	19	3	0	Lost Semi Final to Carlton 107–87; Lost Preliminary Final to Richmond 105–98	Len Thompson (4)	Peter McKenna (7)	86	Wayne Richardson	Neil Mann	
1974	1974 VFL season	4th	Semi Final	15	7	0	Won Elimination Final against Footscray 124–55; Lost Semi Final to Hawthorn 138–88	Wayne Richardson (2)	Peter McKenna (8)	69	Wayne Richardson	Neil Mann	
1975	1975 VFL season	5th	Elimination Final	13	9	0	Lost Elimination Final to Richmond 77–73	Phil Carman	Phil Carman	41	Wayne Richardson	Murray Weideman	
1976	1976 VFL season	12th	—	6	16	0	—	Robert Hyde	Phil Carman (2)	38	Des Tuddenham	Murray Weideman	
1977	1977 VFL season	1st	Runners-up	18	4	0	Won Semi Final against Hawthorn 112–110; Drew Grand Final to North Melbourne 76–76; Lost Grand Final Replay to North Melbourne 151–124	Len Thompson (5)	Peter Moore	76	Max Richardson	Tom Hafey	
1978	1978 VFL season	3rd	Preliminary Final	15	7	0	Lost Qualifying Final to Hawthorn 154–98; Won Semi Final against Carlton 108–93; Lost Preliminary Final to North Melbourne 96–84	Ray Shaw	Peter Moore (2)	57	Len Thompson	Tom Hafey	
1979	1979 VFL season	3rd	Runners-up	15	7	0	Lost Qualifying Final to North Melbourne 121–82; Won Semi Final against Fitzroy 116–94; Won Preliminary Final against North Melbourne 122–95; Lost Grand Final to Carlton 82–77	Peter Moore	Craig Davis	88	Ray Shaw	Tom Hafey	
1980	1980 VFL season	5th	Runners-up	14	7	1	Won Elimination Final against North Melbourne 104–96; Won Semi Final against Carlton 152–102; Won Preliminary Final against Geelong 93–89; Lost Grand Final to Richmond 159–78	Peter Moore (2)	Craig Davis (2)	52	Ray Shaw	Tom Hafey	
1981	1981 VFL season	2nd	Runners-up	17	5	0	Lost Qualifying Final to Geelong 112–98; Won Semi Final against Fitzroy 133–132; Won Preliminary Final against Geelong 82–75; Lost Grand Final to Carlton 92–72	Mark Williams	Peter Daicos	76	Peter Moore	Tom Hafey	
1982	1982 VFL season	10th	—	4	18	0	—	Peter Daicos	Peter Daicos (2)	58	Peter Moore	Tom Hafey / Mick Erwin	
1983	1983 VFL season	6th	—	12	10	0	—	Billy Picken	Mike Richardson	49	Mark Williams	John Cahill	
1984	1984 VFL season	4th	Preliminary Final	13	9	0	Won Elimination Final against Fitzroy 153–107; Won Semi Final against Carlton 118–93; Lost Preliminary Final to Essendon 174–41	Tony Shaw	Mark Williams	53	Mark Williams	John Cahill	
1985	1985 VFL season	7th	—	10	12	0	—	Mark Williams (2)	Brian Taylor	80	Mark Williams	Bob Rose	
1986	1986 VFL season	6th	—	12	10	0	—	Wes Fellowes	Brian Taylor (2)	100	Mark Williams	Bob Rose / Leigh Matthews	
1987	1987 VFL season	12th	—	7	15	0	—	Darren Millane	Brian Taylor (3)	60	Tony Shaw	Leigh Matthews	
1988	1988 VFL season	2nd	Semi Final	15	6	1	Lost Qualifying Final to Carlton 145–107; Lost Semi FInal to Melbourne 95–82	Peter Daicos (2)	Brian Taylor (4)	73	Tony Shaw	Leigh Matthews	
1989	1989 VFL season	5th	Elimination Final	13	9	0	Lost Elimination Final to Melbourne 111–88	Gavin Brown	Brian Taylor (5)	49	Tony Shaw	Leigh Matthews	
1990	1990 AFL season	2nd	Premiers	16	6	0	Drew Qualifying Final to West Coast 90–90; Won Qualifying Final Replay against West Coast 126–67; Won Semi Final against Essendon 117–54; Won Grand Final against Essendon 89–41	Tony Shaw (2)	Peter Daicos (3)	97	Tony Shaw	Leigh Matthews	
1991	1991 AFL season	7th	—	12	9	1	—	Tony Francis	Peter Daicos (4)	75	Tony Shaw	Leigh Matthews	
1992	1992 AFL season	3rd	Elimination Final	16	6	0	Lost Elimination Final to St Kilda 91–83	Mick McGuane	Peter Daicos (5)	52	Tony Shaw	Leigh Matthews	
1993	1993 AFL season	8th	—	11	9	0	—	Mick McGuane (2)	Sav Rocca	73	Tony Shaw	Leigh Matthews	
1994	1994 AFL season	8th	Qualifying Final	12	10	0	Lost Qualifying Final to West Coast 82–80	Gavin Brown (2) / Nathan Buckley	Sav Rocca (2)	49	Gavin Brown	Leigh Matthews	
1995	1995 AFL season	10th	—	8	12	2	—	Sav Rocca	Sav Rocca (3)	93	Gavin Brown	Leigh Matthews	
1996	1996 AFL season	11th	—	9	13	0	—	Nathan Buckley (2)	Sav Rocca (4)	66	Gavin Brown	Tony Shaw	
1997	1997 AFL season	10th	—	10	12	0	—	Gavin Brown (3)	Sav Rocca (5)	76	Gavin Brown	Tony Shaw	
1998	1998 AFL season	14th	—	7	15	0	—	Nathan Buckley (3)	Sav Rocca (6)	68	Gavin Brown	Tony Shaw	
1999	1999 AFL season	16th	—	4	18	0	—	Nathan Buckley (4)	Sav Rocca (7)	33	Nathan Buckley	Tony Shaw	
2000	2000 AFL season	15th	—	7	15	0	—	Nathan Buckley (5)	Anthony Rocca	33	Nathan Buckley	Mick Malthouse	
2001	2001 AFL season	9th	—	11	11	0	—	Paul Licuria	Chris Tarrant	53	Nathan Buckley	Mick Malthouse	
2002	2002 AFL season	4th	Runners-up	13	9	0	Won Qualifying Final against Port Adelaide 108–95; Won Preliminary Final against Adelaide 91–63; Lost Grand Final to Brisbane Lions 75–66	Paul Licuria (2)	Anthony Rocca (2) Chris Tarrant (2)	38	Nathan Buckley	Mick Malthouse	
2003	2003 AFL season	2nd	Runners-up	15	7	0	Won Qualifying Final against Brisbane Lions 66–51; Won Preliminary Final against Port Adelaide 112–68; Lost Grand Final to Brisbane Lions 134–84	Nathan Buckley (6)	Chris Tarrant (3)	54	Nathan Buckley	Mick Malthouse	
2004	2004 AFL season	13th	—	8	14	0	—	James Clement	Chris Tarrant (4)	36	Nathan Buckley	Mick Malthouse	
2005	2005 AFL season	15th	—	5	17	0	—	James Clement (2)	Chris Tarrant (5)	36	Nathan Buckley	Mick Malthouse	
2006	2006 AFL season	5th	Elimination Final	14	8	0	Lost Elimination Final to Western Bulldogs 121–80	Alan Didak	Anthony Rocca (3)	55	Nathan Buckley	Mick Malthouse	
2007	2007 AFL season	6th	Preliminary Final	13	9	0	Won Elimination Final against Sydney 125–87; Won Semi-Final against West Coast 93–74; Lost Preliminary Final to Geelong 92–87	Travis Cloke	Anthony Rocca (4)	54	Nathan Buckley	Mick Malthouse	
2008	2008 AFL season	8th	Semi-Final	12	10	0	Won Elimination Final against Adelaide 125–94; Lost Semi-Final to St Kilda 106–72	Dane Swan	Paul Medhurst	50	Scott Burns	Mick Malthouse	
2009	2009 AFL season	4th	Preliminary Final	15	7	0	Lost Qualifying Final to St Kilda 80–52; Won Semi-Final against Adelaide 83–78; Lost Preliminary Final to Geelong 120–47	Dane Swan (2)	Jack Anthony	50	Nick Maxwell	Mick Malthouse	
2010	2010 AFL season	1st	Premiers	17	4	1	Won Qualifying Final against Western Bulldogs 124–62; Won Preliminary Final against Geelong 120–79; Drew Grand Final against St Kilda 68–68; Won Grand Final Replay against St Kilda 108–52	Dane Swan (3)	Alan Didak	41	Nick Maxwell	Mick Malthouse	
2011	2011 AFL season	1st	Runners-up	20	2	0	Won Qualifying Final against West Coast 82–62; Won Preliminary Final against Hawthorn 68–65; Lost Grand Final to Geelong 119–81	Scott Pendlebury	Travis Cloke	69	Nick Maxwell	Mick Malthouse	
2012	2012 AFL season	4th	Preliminary Finals	16	6	0	Lost Qualifying Final to Hawthorn 135–97; Won Semi-Final against West Coast 73–60; Lost Preliminary Final to Sydney 96–70	Dayne Beams	Travis Cloke (2)	59	Nick Maxwell	Nathan Buckley	
2013	2013 AFL season	6th	Elimination Finals	14	8	0	Lost Elimination Final to Port Adelaide 87–63	Scott Pendlebury (2)	Travis Cloke (3)	68	Nick Maxwell	Nathan Buckley	
2014	2014 AFL season	11th	—	11	11	0	—	Scott Pendlebury (3)	Travis Cloke (4)	39	Scott Pendlebury	Nathan Buckley	
2015	2015 AFL season	12th	—	10	12	0	—	Scott Pendlebury (4)	Jamie Elliott	35	Scott Pendlebury	Nathan Buckley	
2016	2016 AFL season	12th	—	9	13	0	—	Scott Pendlebury (5)	Alex Fasolo	25	Scott Pendlebury	Nathan Buckley	
2017	2017 AFL season	13th	—	9	12	1	—	Steele Sidebottom	Jamie Elliott (2)	34	Scott Pendlebury	Nathan Buckley	
2018	2018 AFL season	3rd	Runners-up	15	7	0	Lost Qualifying Final to West Coast 86–70; Won Semi Final to Greater Western Sydney 69–59; Won Preliminary Final against Richmond 97–58; Lost Grand Final against West Coast 79–74	Brodie Grundy / Steele Sidebottom (2)	Jordan De Goey	48	Scott Pendlebury	Nathan Buckley	
2019	2019 AFL season	4th	Preliminary Finals	15	7	0	Won Qualifying Final against Geelong 61–51; Lost Preliminary Final to Greater Western Sydney 56–52	Brodie Grundy (2)	Brody Mihocek	36	Scott Pendlebury	Nathan Buckley	
2020	2020 AFL season	8th	Semi Finals	9	7	1	Won Elimination Final against West Coast 76–75; Lost Semi Final to Geelong 100–32	Taylor Adams	Brody Mihocek (2)	25	Scott Pendlebury	Nathan Buckley	
2021	2021 AFL season	17th	—	6	16	0	—	Jack Crisp	Brody Mihocek (3)	34	Scott Pendlebury	Nathan Buckley / Robert Harvey	
2022	2022 AFL season	4th	Preliminary Finals	16	6	0	Lost Qualifying Final to Geelong 78–72; Won Semi Final against Fremantle 79–59; Lost Preliminary Final to Sydney 95–94	Jack Crisp (2)	Brody Mihocek (4)	41	Scott Pendlebury	Craig McRae	
2023	2023 AFL season	1st	Premiers	18	5	0	Won Qualifying Final against Melbourne 60–53; Won Preliminary Final against Greater Western Sydney 58–57; Won Grand Final against Brisbane Lions 90–86	Josh Daicos	Brody Mihocek (5)	47	Darcy Moore	Craig McRae	
2024	2024 AFL season	9th	—	12	9	2	—	Nick Daicos	Bobby Hill	30	Darcy Moore	Craig McRae	
2025	2025 AFL season	4th	Preliminary Finals	16	7	0	Won Qualifying Final against Adelaide 79–55; Lost Preliminary Final to Brisbane Lions 100–71		Jamie Elliott (3)	60	Darcy Moore	Craig McRae	
