= List of Collingwood Football Club leading goalkickers =

The following is a list of Collingwood Football Club leading goalkickers in each season of the Victorian Football Association, Australian Football League (formerly the Victorian Football League) and AFL Women's. The Gordon Coventry Trophy is given to each player who wins the award, named after legendary Australian Football Hall of Fame Collingwood player Gordon Coventry.

== VFA ==
The following players finished as the leading goalkicker in the respective VFA season:

Season	Leading goalkicker	Goals
1892	George Anderson	12
1892	Archie Smith	12
1893	George Anderson (2)	20
1894	Archie Smith (2)	25
1895	Archie Smith (3)	27
1896	Wal Gillard	13

== VFL/AFL ==
The following players finished as the leading goalkicker in the respective VFL/AFL season:

Season	Leading goalkicker	Goals
1897	Archie Smith (4)	15
1898	Archie Smith (5)	31
1899	Archie Smith (6)	17
1900	Archie Smith (7)	21
1901	Ted Rowell	31
1902	Ted Rowell (2)	33
1903	Teddy Lockwood	35
1904	Charlie Pannam	24
1905	Charlie Pannam (2)	38
1906	Dick Lee	35
1907	Dick Lee (2)	47
1908	Dick Lee (3)	54
1909	Dick Lee (4)	58
1910	Dick Lee (5)	58
1911	Tom Baxter	31
1912	Les Hughes	13
1913	Les Hughes (2)	22
1914	Dick Lee (6)	57
1915	Dick Lee (7)	66
1916	Dick Lee (8)	48
1917	Dick Lee (9)	54
1918	Tom Wraith	26
1919	Dick Lee (10)	56
1920	Ern Utting	23
1921	Dick Lee (11)	64
1922	Gordon Coventry	42
1923	Gordon Coventry (2)	36
1924	Gordon Coventry (3)	28
1925	Gordon Coventry (4)	68
1926	Gordon Coventry (5)	83
1927	Gordon Coventry (6)	97
1928	Gordon Coventry (7)	89
1929	Gordon Coventry (8)	124
1930	Gordon Coventry (9)	118
1931	Gordon Coventry (10)	67
1932	Gordon Coventry (11)	82
1933	Gordon Coventry (12)	108
1934	Gordon Coventry (13)	105
1935	Gordon Coventry (14)	88
1936	Gordon Coventry (15)	60
1937	Gordon Coventry (16)	72
1938	Ron Todd	120
1939	Ron Todd (2)	121
1940	Des Fothergill	56
1941	Alby Pannam	42
1942	Alby Pannam (2)	37
1943	Alby Pannam (3)	40
1944	Bob Galbally	26
1944	Lou Richards	26
1945	Des Fothergill (2)	62
1946	Des Fothergill (3)	63
1947	Neil Mann	48
1948	Lou Richards (2)	44
1949	Jack Pimm	34
1950	Lou Richards (3)	35
1951	Maurie Dunstan	40
1952	Maurie Dunstan (2)	43
1953	Bob Rose	36
1954	Keith Bromage	22
1955	Ken Smale	47
1956	Ken Smale (2)	33
1957	Ian Brewer	26
1958	Ian Brewer (2)	73
1959	Murray Weideman	36
1960	Murray Weideman (2)	30
1961	Kevin Pay	31
1962	Murray Weideman (3)	48
1963	Terry Waters	50
1964	Ian Graham	42
1964	Terry Waters (2)	42
1965	David Norman	32
1966	Ian Graham (2)	58
1967	Peter McKenna	47
1968	Peter McKenna (2)	64
1969	Peter McKenna (3)	98
1970	Peter McKenna (4)	143
1971	Peter McKenna (5)	134
1972	Peter McKenna (6)	130
1973	Peter McKenna (7)	86
1974	Peter McKenna (8)	69
1975	Phil Carman	41
1976	Phil Carman (2)	38
1977	Peter Moore	76
1978	Peter Moore (2)	57
1979	Craig Davis	88
1980	Craig Davis (2)	52
1981	Peter Daicos	76
1982	Peter Daicos (2)	58
1983	Mike Richardson	49
1984	Mark Williams	53
1985	Brian Taylor	80
1986	Brian Taylor (2)	100
1987	Brian Taylor (3)	60
1988	Brian Taylor (4)	73
1989	Brian Taylor (5)	49
1990	Peter Daicos (3)	97
1991	Peter Daicos (4)	75
1992	Peter Daicos (5)	52
1993	Sav Rocca	73
1994	Sav Rocca (2)	49
1995	Sav Rocca (3)	93
1996	Sav Rocca (4)	66
1997	Sav Rocca (5)	76
1998	Sav Rocca (6)	68
1999	Sav Rocca (7)	33
2000	Anthony Rocca	33
2001	Chris Tarrant	53
2002	Anthony Rocca (2)	38
2002	Chris Tarrant (2)	38
2003	Chris Tarrant (3)	54
2004	Chris Tarrant (4)	36
2005	Chris Tarrant (5)	36
2006	Anthony Rocca (3)	55
2007	Anthony Rocca (4)	54
2008	Paul Medhurst	50
2009	Jack Anthony	50
2010	Alan Didak	41
2011	Travis Cloke	69
2012	Travis Cloke (2)	59
2013	Travis Cloke (3)	68
2014	Travis Cloke (4)	39
2015	Jamie Elliott	35
2016	Alex Fasolo	25
2017	Jamie Elliott (2)	34
2018	Jordan De Goey	48
2019	Brody Mihocek	36
2020	Brody Mihocek (2)	25
2021	Brody Mihocek (3)	34
2022	Brody Mihocek (4)	41
2023	Brody Mihocek (5)	47
2024	Bobby Hill	30
2025	Jamie Elliott (3)	60
2026	Daniel McStay	47

== AFL Women's ==
Season	Leading goalkicker	Goals
2017	Moana Hope	7
2018	Christina Bernardi	9
2019	Sarah D'Arcy	4
2020	Jordan Membrey	7
2021	Chloe Molloy	16
2022 (S6)	Chloe Molloy (2)	8
2022 (S7)	Eliza James	10
2023	Nell Morris-Dalton	8
2024	Imogen Barnett	4
2024	Brittany Bonnici	4
2024	Lauren Butler	4
2025	Kalinda Howarth	7
