= VFL/AFL goalkicking records =

Former Collingwood player Gordon Coventry was the first VFL/AFL player to kick 1,000 goals

This page is a collection of VFL/AFL goalkicking records. The Australian Football League (AFL), known as the Victorian Football League (VFL) until 1990, is the elite national competition in men's Australian rules football. This list only includes home-and-away matches and finals; representative games (i.e. State of Origin or international rules), pre-season and night series games are excluded from the totals.

== Most VFL/AFL goals ==
Below are the players who have kicked at least 500 goals at VFL/AFL level.

| ^{‡} | Most VFL/AFL goals for that club |
| **Bold** | Current player |

Updated to the end of the 2026 season.

| # | Player | Goals | Club(s) | Games | Average per game | Average per season | Career span | Ref. |
|---|---|---|---|---|---|---|---|---|
| 1 | Tony Lockett | 1360 | St Kilda (1983–1994; 898 goals, 183 games)^{‡} | 281 | 4.84 | 75.56 | 1983–1999, 2002 | |
| 1 | Tony Lockett | 1360 | Sydney (1995–1999, 2002; 462 goals, 98 games) | 281 | 4.84 | 75.56 | 1983–1999, 2002 | |
| 2 | Gordon Coventry | 1299^{‡} | Collingwood^{‡} | 306 | 4.25 | 72.17 | 1920–1937 | |
| 3 | Jason Dunstall | 1254^{‡} | Hawthorn^{‡} | 269 | 4.66 | 89.57 | 1985–1998 | |
| 4 | Lance Franklin | 1066 | Hawthorn (2005–2013; 580 goals, 182 games) | 354 | 3.01 | 56.11 | 2005–2023 | |
| 4 | Lance Franklin | 1066 | Sydney (2014–2023; 486 goals, 172 games) | 354 | 3.01 | 56.11 | 2005–2023 | |
| 5 | Doug Wade | 1057 | Geelong (1961–1972; 834 goals, 208 games) | 267 | 3.96 | 70.47 | 1961–1975 | |
| 5 | Doug Wade | 1057 | North Melbourne (1973–1975; 223 goals, 59 games) | 267 | 3.96 | 70.47 | 1961–1975 | |
| 6 | Gary Ablett Sr. | 1031 | Hawthorn (1982; 10 goals, 6 games) | 248 | 4.16 | 68.73 | 1982, 1984–1997 | |
| 6 | Gary Ablett Sr. | 1031 | Geelong (1984–1997; 1021 goals, 242 games)^{‡} | 248 | 4.16 | 68.73 | 1982, 1984–1997 | |
| 7 | Jack Titus | 970^{‡} | Richmond^{‡} | 294 | 3.30 | 53.89 | 1926–1943 | |
| 8 | Matthew Lloyd | 926^{‡} | Essendon^{‡} | 270 | 3.43 | 61.73 | 1995–2009 | |
| 9 | Leigh Matthews | 915 | Hawthorn | 332 | 2.76 | 53.82 | 1969–1985 | |
| 10 | Peter McKenna | 874 | Collingwood (1965–1975; 838 goals, 180 games) | 191 | 4.58 | 72.83 | 1965–1975, 1977 | |
| 10 | Peter McKenna | 874 | Carlton (1977; 36 goals, 11 games) | 191 | 4.58 | 72.83 | 1965–1975, 1977 | |
| 11 | Bernie Quinlan | 817 | Footscray (1969–1977; 241 goals, 177 games) | 366 | 2.23 | 45.39 | 1969–1986 | |
| 11 | Bernie Quinlan | 817 | Fitzroy (1978–1986; 576 goals, 189 games) | 366 | 2.23 | 45.39 | 1969–1986 | |
| 12 | Matthew Richardson | 800 | Richmond | 282 | 2.84 | 47.06 | 1993–2009 | |
| 13 | Tom Hawkins | 796 | Geelong | 359 | 2.22 | 44.22 | 2007–2024 | |
| 14 | Jack Riewoldt | 787 | Richmond | 347 | 2.26 | 46.29 | 2007–2023 | |
| 15 | Kevin Bartlett | 778 | Richmond | 403 | 1.93 | 40.95 | 1965–1983 | |
| 16 | **Jeremy Cameron** | **777** | Greater Western Sydney (2012–2020; 427 goals, 171 games) | **299** | **2.60** | **51.80** | **2012–present** | |
| 16 | **Jeremy Cameron** | **777** | **Geelong (2021–present; 350 goals, 128 games)** | **299** | **2.60** | **51.80** | **2012–present** | |
| 17 | Saverio Rocca | 748 | Collingwood (1992–2000; 514 goals, 156 games) | 257 | 2.91 | 49.87 | 1992–2006 | |
| 17 | Saverio Rocca | 748 | Kangaroos (2001–2006; 234 goals, 101 games) | 257 | 2.91 | 49.87 | 1992–2006 | |
| 18 | Barry Hall | 746 | St Kilda (1996–2001; 144 goals, 88 games) | 289 | 2.58 | 46.63 | 1996–2011 | |
| 18 | Barry Hall | 746 | Sydney (2002–2009; 467 goals, 162 games) | 289 | 2.58 | 46.63 | 1996–2011 | |
| 18 | Barry Hall | 746 | Western Bulldogs (2010–2011; 135 goals, 39 games) | 289 | 2.58 | 46.63 | 1996–2011 | |
| 19 | Stephen Kernahan | 738^{‡} | Carlton^{‡} | 251 | 2.94 | 61.50 | 1986–1997 | |
| 20 | Bill Mohr | 735 | St Kilda | 195 | 3.77 | 56.54 | 1929–1941 | |
| 21 | Peter Hudson | 727 | Hawthorn | 129 | 5.64 | 80.78 | 1967–1974, 1977 | |
| 21 | Wayne Carey | 727 | North Melbourne/Kangaroos (1989–2001; 671 goals, 244 games)^{‡} | 272 | 2.67 | 48.47 | 1989–2001, 2003–2004 | |
| 21 | Wayne Carey | 727 | Adelaide (2003–2004; 46 goals, 28 games) | 272 | 2.67 | 48.47 | 1989–2001, 2003–2004 | |
| 23 | Josh Kennedy | 723 | Carlton (2006–2007; 11 goals, 22 games) | 293 | 2.47 | 42.53 | 2006–2022 | |
| 23 | Josh Kennedy | 723 | West Coast (2008–2022; 712 goals, 271 games)^{‡} | 293 | 2.47 | 42.53 | 2006–2022 | |
| 24 | Harry Vallence | 722 | Carlton | 204 | 3.54 | 55.54 | 1926–1938 | |
| 25 | Nick Riewoldt | 718 | St Kilda | 336 | 2.14 | 42.24 | 2001–2017 | |
| 26 | Taylor Walker | 715^{‡} | Adelaide^{‡} | 319 | 2.24 | 37.63 | 2008–2026 | |
| 27 | Dick Lee | 707 | Collingwood | 230 | 3.07 | 41.59 | 1906–1922 | |
| 28 | Matthew Pavlich | 700^{‡} | Fremantle^{‡} | 353 | 1.98 | 41.18 | 2000–2016 | |
| 29 | Bob Pratt | 681^{‡} | South Melbourne^{‡} | 158 | 4.31 | 61.91 | 1930–1939, 1946 | |
| 30 | Jack Moriarty | 662 | Essendon (1922; 36 goals, 13 games) | 170 | 3.89 | 60.18 | 1922, 1924–1933 | |
| 30 | Jack Moriarty | 662 | Fitzroy (1924–1933; 626 goals, 157 games)^{‡} | 170 | 3.89 | 60.18 | 1922, 1924–1933 | |
| 31 | Eddie Betts | 640 | Carlton (2005–2013, 2020–2021; 330 goals, 218 games) | 350 | 1.83 | 37.65 | 2005–2021 | |
| 31 | Eddie Betts | 640 | Adelaide (2014–2019; 310 goals, 132 games) | 350 | 1.83 | 37.65 | 2005–2021 | |
| 32 | Alastair Lynch | 633 | Fitzroy (1988–1993; 173 goals, 120 games) | 306 | 2.07 | 37.24 | 1988–2004 | |
| 32 | Alastair Lynch | 633 | Brisbane Bears (1994–1996; 89 goals, 32 games) | 306 | 2.07 | 37.24 | 1988–2004 | |
| 32 | Alastair Lynch | 633 | Brisbane Lions (1997–2004; 371 goals, 154 games) | 306 | 2.07 | 37.24 | 1988–2004 | |
| 33 | David Neitz | 631^{‡} | Melbourne^{‡} | 306 | 2.06 | 39.44 | 1993–2008 | |
| 34 | Michael Moncrieff | 629 | Hawthorn | 224 | 2.81 | 48.38 | 1971–1983 | |
| 35 | Brendan Fevola | 623 | Carlton (1999–2009; 575 goals, 187 games) | 204 | 3.05 | 51.92 | 1999–2010 | |
| 35 | Brendan Fevola | 623 | Brisbane Lions (2010; 48 goals, 17 games) | 204 | 3.05 | 51.92 | 1999–2010 | |
| 36 | **Jack Gunston** | **620** | Adelaide (2010–2011; 20 goals, 14 games) | **302** | **2.05** | **36.47** | **2010–present** | |
| 36 | **Jack Gunston** | **620** | **Hawthorn (2012–2022, 2024–present; 578 goals, 271 games)** | **302** | **2.05** | **36.47** | **2010–present** | |
| 36 | **Jack Gunston** | **620** | Brisbane Lions (2023; 22 goals, 17 games) | **302** | **2.05** | **36.47** | **2010–present** | |
| 37 | Michael Roach | 607 | Richmond | 200 | 3.04 | 46.69 | 1977–1989 | |
| 38 | Stewart Loewe | 594 | St Kilda | 321 | 1.85 | 34.94 | 1986–2002 | |
| 38 | Jonathan Brown | 594^{‡} | Brisbane Lions^{‡} | 256 | 2.32 | 39.60 | 2000–2014 | |
| 40 | Kelvin Templeton | 593 | Footscray (1974–1982; 494 goals, 143 games) | 177 | 3.35 | 49.42 | 1974–1985 | |
| 40 | Kelvin Templeton | 593 | Melbourne (1983–1985; 99 goals, 34 games) | 177 | 3.35 | 49.42 | 1974–1985 | |
| 41 | **Jack Darling** | **592** | West Coast (2011–2024; 532 goals, 298 games) | **342** | **1.73** | **37.00** | **2011–present** | |
| 41 | **Jack Darling** | **592** | **North Melbourne (2025–present; 60 goals, 44 games)** | **342** | **1.73** | **37.00** | **2011–present** | |
| 42 | Tony Modra | 588 | Adelaide (1992–1998; 440 goals, 118 games) | 165 | 3.56 | 58.80 | 1992–2001 | |
| 42 | Tony Modra | 588 | Fremantle (1999–2001; 148 goals, 47 games) | 165 | 3.56 | 58.80 | 1992–2001 | |
| 43 | Jarryd Roughead | 578 | Hawthorn | 283 | 2.04 | 38.53 | 2005–2019 | |
| 44 | Simon Madden | 575 | Essendon | 378 | 1.52 | 30.26 | 1974–1992 | |
| 44 | Simon Beasley | 575^{‡} | Footscray^{‡} | 154 | 3.73 | 71.88 | 1982–1989 | |
| 46 | Richard Osborne | 574 | Fitzroy (1982–1992; 411 goals, 187 games) | 283 | 2.03 | 33.76 | 1982–1998 | |
| 46 | Richard Osborne | 574 | Sydney (1993; 39 goals, 16 games) | 283 | 2.03 | 33.76 | 1982–1998 | |
| 46 | Richard Osborne | 574 | Footscray (1994–1996; 98 goals, 51 games) | 283 | 2.03 | 33.76 | 1982–1998 | |
| 46 | Richard Osborne | 574 | Collingwood (1997–1998; 26 goals, 29 games) | 283 | 2.03 | 33.76 | 1982–1998 | |
| 46 | Stephen Milne | 574 | St Kilda | 275 | 2.09 | 44.15 | 2001–2013 | |
| 48 | Norm Smith | 572 | Melbourne (1935–1948; 546 goals, 210 games) | 227 | 2.52 | 35.75 | 1935–1950 | |
| 48 | Norm Smith | 572 | Fitzroy (1949–1950; 26 goals, 17 games) | 227 | 2.52 | 35.75 | 1935–1950 | |
| 49 | Paul Salmon | 561 | Essendon (1983–1995, 2002; 520 goals, 224 games) | 324 | 1.73 | 29.53 | 1983–2000, 2002 | |
| 49 | Paul Salmon | 561 | Hawthorn (1996–2000; 41 goals, 100 games) | 324 | 1.73 | 29.53 | 1983–2000, 2002 | |
| 50 | Brad Johnson | 558 | Footscray/Western Bulldogs | 364 | 1.53 | 32.82 | 1994–2010 | |
| 51 | Chris Grant | 554 | Footscray/Western Bulldogs | 341 | 1.62 | 30.78 | 1990–2007 | |
| 52 | Luke Breust | 553 | Hawthorn | 308 | 1.80 | 32.53 | 2009–2025 | |
| 53 | Peter Daicos | 549 | Collingwood | 250 | 2.20 | 36.60 | 1979–1993 | |
| 53 | Fraser Gehrig | 549 | West Coast (1995–2000; 159 goals, 115 games) | 260 | 2.11 | 39.21 | 1995–2008 | |
| 53 | Fraser Gehrig | 549 | St Kilda (2001–2008; 390 goals, 145 games) | 260 | 2.11 | 39.21 | 1995–2008 | |
| 53 | Warren Tredrea | 549^{‡} | Port Adelaide^{‡} | 255 | 2.15 | 39.21 | 1997–2010 | |
| 56 | Dick Harris | 548 | Richmond | 196 | 2.80 | 49.82 | 1934–1944 | |
| 57 | Lindsay White | 540 | Geelong (1941, 1944–1950; 429 goals, 117 games) | 142 | 3.80 | 54.00 | 1941–1950 | |
| 57 | Lindsay White | 540 | South Melbourne (1942–1943; 111 goals, 25 games) | 142 | 3.80 | 54.00 | 1941–1950 | |
| 58 | John Coleman | 537 | Essendon | 98 | 5.48 | 89.50 | 1949–1954 | |
| 59 | Brian Taylor | 527 | Richmond (1980–1984; 156 goals, 43 games) | 140 | 3.76 | 47.91 | 1980–1990 | |
| 59 | Brian Taylor | 527 | Collingwood (1985–1990; 371 goals, 97 games) | 140 | 3.76 | 47.91 | 1980–1990 | |
| 60 | Daniel Bradshaw | 524 | Brisbane Bears (1996; 0 goals, 3 games) | 231 | 2.27 | 34.93 | 1996–2010 | |
| 60 | Daniel Bradshaw | 524 | Brisbane Lions (1997–2009; 496 goals, 219 games) | 231 | 2.27 | 34.93 | 1996–2010 | |
| 60 | Daniel Bradshaw | 524 | Sydney (2010; 28 goals, 9 games) | 231 | 2.27 | 34.93 | 1996–2010 | |
| 61 | Michael O'Loughlin | 521 | Sydney | 303 | 1.72 | 34.73 | 1995–2009 | |
| 62 | Brent Harvey | 518 | North Melbourne/Kangaroos | 432 | 1.20 | 20.57 | 1996–2016 | |
| 63 | Steve Johnson | 516 | Geelong (2002–2015; 452 goals, 253 games) | 293 | 1.75 | 32.25 | 2002–2017 | |
| 63 | Steve Johnson | 516 | Greater Western Sydney (2016–2017; 64 goals, 40 games) | 293 | 1.75 | 32.25 | 2002–2017 | |
| 64 | Peter Sumich | 514 | West Coast | 150 | 3.43 | 57.11 | 1989–1997 | |
| 65 | John Longmire | 511 | North Melbourne/Kangaroos | 200 | 2.56 | 42.58 | 1988–1999 | |
| 66 | **Tom Lynch** | **508** | Gold Coast (2011–2018; 254 goals, 131 games) | **251** | **2.02** | **31.75** | **2011–present** | |
| 66 | **Tom Lynch** | **508** | **Richmond (2019–present; 254 goals, 120 games)** | **251** | **2.02** | **31.75** | **2011–present** | |

== Club goalkicking record holders ==
Below are the players who hold the record for most goals kicked at their respective clubs.

| **Bold** | Current player |

Updated to the end of the 2026 season.

| Club | Player | Goals | Games | Years | Ref. |
|---|---|---|---|---|---|
| Adelaide | Taylor Walker | 715 | 319 | 2008–2026 | |
| Brisbane Bears | Roger Merrett | 285 | 164 | 1988–1996 | |
| Brisbane Lions | Jonathan Brown | 594 | 256 | 2000–2014 | |
| Carlton | Stephen Kernahan | 738 | 251 | 1986–1997 | |
| Collingwood | Gordon Coventry | 1299 | 306 | 1920–1937 | |
| Essendon | Matthew Lloyd | 926 | 270 | 1995–2009 | |
| Fitzroy | Jack Moriarty | 626 | 157 | 1924–1933 | |
| Footscray/Western Bulldogs | Simon Beasley | 575 | 154 | 1982–1989 | |
| Fremantle | Matthew Pavlich | 700 | 353 | 2000–2016 | |
| Geelong | Gary Ablett Sr. | 1021 | 242 | 1984–1997 | |
| Gold Coast | **Ben King** | **315** | **143** | **2019–present** | |
| Greater Western Sydney | **Toby Greene** | **450** | **282** | **2012–present** | |
| Hawthorn | Jason Dunstall | 1254 | 269 | 1985–1998 | |
| Melbourne | David Neitz | 631 | 306 | 1993–2008 | |
| North Melbourne/Kangaroos | Wayne Carey | 671 | 244 | 1989–2001 | |
| Port Adelaide | Warren Tredrea | 549 | 255 | 1997–2010 | |
| Richmond | Jack Titus | 970 | 294 | 1926–1943 | |
| South Melbourne/Sydney | Bob Pratt | 681 | 158 | 1930–1939, 1946 | |
| St Kilda | Tony Lockett | 898 | 183 | 1983–1994 | |
| University | Roy Park | 111 | 44 | 1912–1914 | |
| West Coast | Josh Kennedy | 712 | 271 | 2008–2022 | |

== VFL/AFL goalkicking record holder ==
Below are the players who have held the record for the most goals kicked at VFL/AFL level, beginning with the first player to reach 100 goals.

| Player | Total to break record | Record broken | Career goals | Club(s) | Career span |
|---|---|---|---|---|---|
| Archie Smith | First to reach 100 goals (round 9, 1902) | | 119 | Collingwood | 1897–1902 |
| Jack Leith | 120 | Round 14, 1903 | 162 | Melbourne | 1897–1908, 1911–1912 |
| Teddy Lockwood | 127 | Round 2, 1904 | 144 | Geelong (1899–1901; 45 games, 61 goals) | 1899–1905 |
| Teddy Lockwood | 127 | Round 2, 1904 | 144 | Collingwood (1902–1905; 53 games, 83 goals) | 1899–1905 |
| Mick Grace | 145 | Round 9, 1906 | 214 | Fitzroy (1897–1900; 65 games, 55 goals) | 1897–1900, 1903–1908 |
| Mick Grace | 145 | Round 9, 1906 | 214 | Carlton (1903–1907; 86 games, 133 goals) | 1897–1900, 1903–1908 |
| Mick Grace | 145 | Round 9, 1906 | 214 | St Kilda (1908; 16 games, 26 goals) | 1897–1900, 1903–1908 |
| Dick Lee | 215 | Round 7, 1910 | 707 | Collingwood | 1906–1922 |
| Len Mortimer | 280 | Round 14, 1913 | 289 | South Melbourne | 1906–1915 |
| Dick Lee | 281 | Round 15, 1913 | 707 | Collingwood | 1906–1922 |
| Gordon Coventry | 708 | Preliminary final, 1930 | 1299 | Collingwood | 1920–1937 |
| Tony Lockett | 1300 | Round 10, 1999 | 1360 | St Kilda (1983–1994; 183 games, 898 goals) | 1983–1999, 2002 |
| Tony Lockett | 1300 | Round 10, 1999 | 1360 | Sydney (1995–1999, 2002; 98 games, 462 goals) | 1983–1999, 2002 |

== See also ==
- VFL/AFL games records
- AFL Women's goalkicking records

== Sources ==
- Most career goals at AFL Tables
- Every AFL goalkicker at Australian Football
