= 1895 VFA season =

1895 premiership season
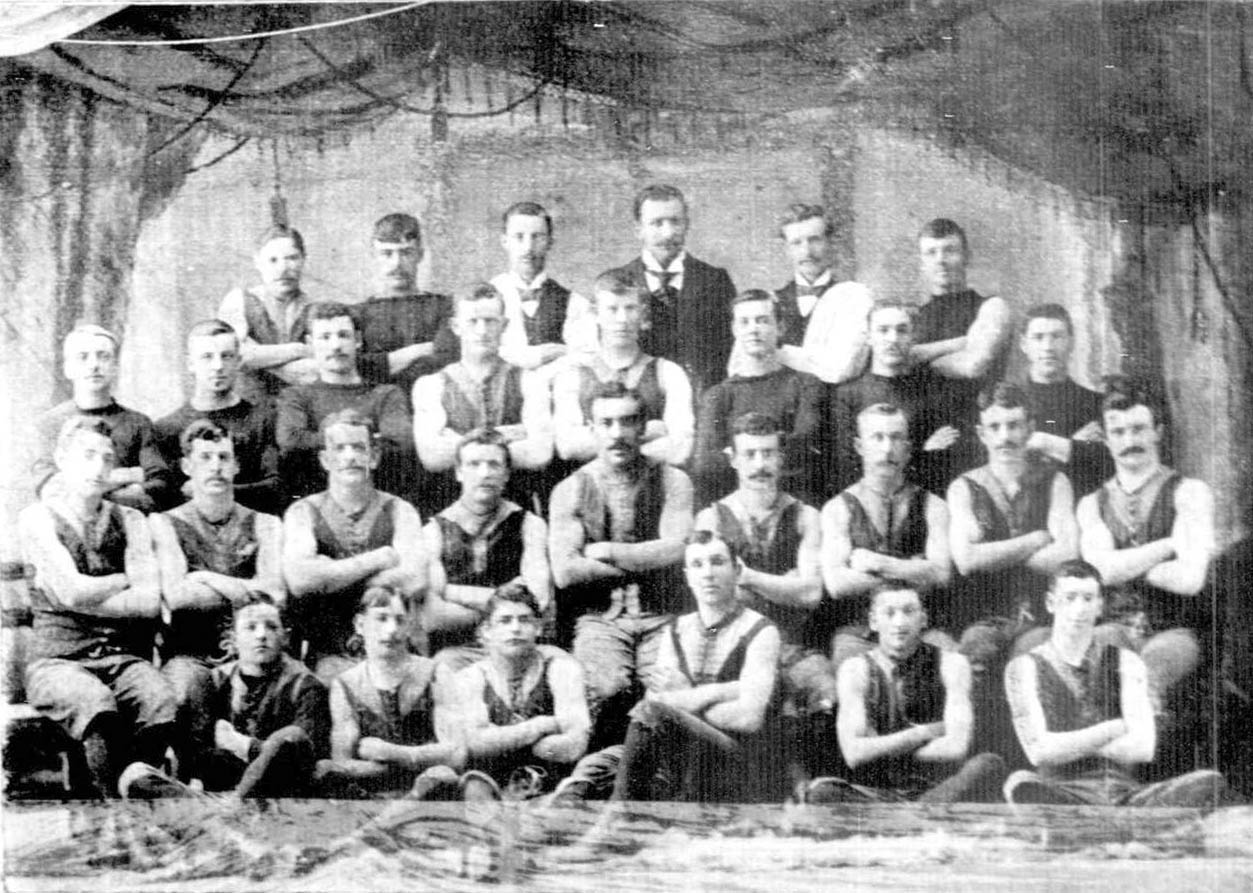
- Fitzroy FC, Premier team
- Teams: 13
- Premiers: Fitzroy; 1st premiership
- Matches played: 117

The 1895 Victorian Football Association season was the 19th season of the Australian rules football competition. The season was opened on 4 May, and concluded on 21 September. Fitzroy won the premiership by six points, with a record of 12 wins, 5 draws and one loss. It was Fitzroy's first VFA premiership.

== Premiership season ==
In 1895, the VFA competition consisted of thirteen teams of 20 on-the-field players each. Unless otherwise noted, matches began at 3pm. Because there was an odd number of teams, at least one team had a bye each week; the idle club often travelled to Ballarat to play one of the local senior clubs in a non-premiership match. When reporting match scores in 1895, the number of goals and behinds scored by each team is given; however, only the number of goals scored is considered when determining the result of a match.

=== Round 1 ===
	Round 1
Saturday, 4 May	Essendon 8.17	def.	Richmond 4.3	East Melbourne Cricket Ground
Saturday, 4 May	Melbourne 10.10	def.	South Melbourne 7.8	Melbourne Cricket Ground
Saturday, 4 May	Geelong 11.11	def.	North Melbourne 2.3	Corio Oval
Saturday, 4 May	Footscray 3.9	def. by	Fitzroy 5.5	Western Reserve
Saturday, 4 May	Port Melbourne 3.5	def. by	Collingwood 6.3	Port Melbourne Cricket Ground
Saturday, 4 May	Williamstown 7.3	def.	St Kilda 4.8	Williamstown Cricket Ground
	Bye; Carlton

=== Round 2 ===
	Round 2
Saturday, 11 May	Port Melbourne 2.3	def. by	Essendon 4.7	Port Melbourne Cricket Ground
Saturday, 11 May	Collingwood 2.1	def. by	Melbourne 6.9	Victoria Park
Saturday, 11 May	St Kilda 4.3	def.	South Melbourne 3.12	St Kilda Cricket Ground
Saturday, 11 May	Geelong 10.15	def.	Carlton 3.2	Corio Oval
Saturday, 11 May	Fitzroy 3.13	def.	Williamstown 2.2	Fitzroy Cricket Ground
Saturday, 11 May	Richmond 9.5	def.	Footscray 5.16	Richmond Cricket Ground
	Bye; North Melbourne

=== Round 3 ===
	Round 3
Saturday, 18 May	Essendon 3.6	def. by	Melbourne 5.10	East Melbourne Cricket Ground (crowd: 12,000)
Saturday, 18 May	Fitzroy 3.13	def.	South Melbourne 2.9	Fitzroy Cricket Ground
Saturday, 18 May	Footscray 2.4	def. by	Geelong 4.8	Western Reserve
Saturday, 18 May	North Melbourne 4.6	def. by	Port Melbourne 5.2	North Melbourne Recreation Reserve
Saturday, 18 May	St Kilda 4.5	def. by	Collingwood 6.8	St Kilda Cricket Ground
Saturday, 18 May	Carlton 7.10	def.	Richmond 1.9	University Cricket Ground
	Bye; Williamstown

=== Round 4 ===
	Round 4 (Queen's Birthday)
Friday, 24 May	North Melbourne 4.7	def. by	South Melbourne 10.11	North Melbourne Recreation Reserve
Friday, 24 May	Carlton 6.8	def.	St Kilda 3.3	Melbourne Cricket Ground
Friday 24 May	Geelong 7.10	def.	Fitzroy 1.3	Corio Oval
Saturday, 25 May	Melbourne 10.11	def.	Footscray 5.10	Melbourne Cricket Ground (crowd: 5,000)
Saturday, 25 May	Collingwood 7.11	def.	Richmond 2.4	Victoria Park
Saturday, 25 May	Port Melbourne 4.6	drew with	Williamstown 4.6	Port Melbourne Cricket Ground
	Bye; Essendon

=== Round 5 ===
	Round 5
Saturday, 1 June	St Kilda 3.7	def. by	North Melbourne 4.10	St Kilda Cricket Ground
Saturday, 1 June	Geelong 15.13	def.	Port Melbourne 3.2	Corio Oval
Saturday, 1 June	South Melbourne 3.10	def.	Collingwood 2.10	South Melbourne Cricket Ground
Saturday, 1 June	Essendon 6.10	def.	Williamstown 3.3	East Melbourne Cricket Ground
Saturday, 1 June	Fitzroy 9.14	def.	Richmond 2.5	Fitzroy Cricket Ground
Saturday, 1 June	Carlton 3.8	def. by	Footscray 6.5	University Cricket Ground
	Bye; Melbourne

=== Round 6 ===
	Round 6
Saturday, 15 June	Geelong 8.11	def.	South Melbourne 1.8	Corio Oval (crowd: 5,000)
Saturday, 15 June	Essendon 3.9	drew with	Fitzroy 3.8	East Melbourne Cricket Ground (crowd: 6,000)
Saturday, 15 June	Melbourne 6.13	def.	North Melbourne 3.8	Melbourne Cricket Ground
Saturday, 15 June	Williamstown 7.7	def.	Footscray 5.6	Williamstown Cricket Ground
Saturday, 15 June	Richmond 6.14	drew with	St Kilda 6.9	Richmond Cricket Ground
Saturday, 15 June	Carlton 4.3	def. by	Collingwood 5.8	University Cricket Ground
	Bye; Port Melbourne

=== Round 7 ===
	Round 7
Saturday, 22 June	South Melbourne 7.9	def.	Port Melbourne 6.6	South Melbourne Cricket Ground
Saturday, 22 June	Williamstown 5.8	def.	North Melbourne 4.9	Williamstown Cricket Ground
Saturday, 22 June	Geelong 9.11	def.	St Kilda 3.10	Corio Oval
Saturday, 22 June	Fitzroy 2.12	drew with	Carlton 2.3	Fitzroy Cricket Ground
Saturday, 22 June	Richmond 7.9	def. by	Melbourne 15.13	Richmond Cricket Ground
Saturday, 22 June	Collingwood 4.2	def.	Essendon 3.9	Victoria Park
	Bye; Footscray

=== Round 8 ===
	Round 8
Saturday, 29 June	South Melbourne 9.5	def.	Essendon 7.10	South Melbourne Cricket Ground
Saturday, 29 June	North Melbourne 1.6	def. by	Fitzroy 6.10	North Melbourne Recreation Reserve
Saturday, 29 June	Footscray 5.5	def.	Collingwood 4.3	Western Reserve
Saturday, 29 June	Williamstown 4.10	def. by	Geelong 9.10	Williamstown Cricket Ground
Saturday, 29 June	Melbourne 8.11	def.	Carlton 1.3	Melbourne Cricket Ground
Saturday, 29 June	St Kilda 3.8	def. by	Port Melbourne 5.4	St Kilda Cricket Ground
	Bye; Richmond

=== Round 9 ===
	Round 9
Saturday, 6 July	Footscray 4.6	drew with	Port Melbourne 4.8	Western Reserve
Saturday, 6 July	Carlton 2.2	def.	North Melbourne 1.9	Melbourne Cricket Ground
Saturday, 6 July	Richmond 5.3	drew with	South Melbourne 5.17	Richmond Cricket Ground
Saturday, 6 July	St Kilda 3.8	def. by	Essendon 7.10	St Kilda Cricket Ground
Saturday, 6 July	Williamstown 2.1	def. by	Melbourne 3.9	Williamstown Cricket Ground
Saturday, 6 July	Geelong 6.8	def.	Collingwood 1.5	Corio Oval
	Bye; Fitzroy

=== Round 10 ===
	Round 10
Saturday, 13 July	Footscray 7.11	def.	Essendon 6.12	Western Reserve
Saturday, 13 July	Fitzroy 2.4	def.	Melbourne 1.3	Fitzroy Cricket Ground
Saturday, 13 July	North Melbourne 1.3	def. by	Collingwood 2.4	North Melbourne Recreation Reserve
Saturday, 13 July	Richmond 4.3	def. by	Geelong 14.19	Richmond Cricket Ground
Saturday, 13 July	Port Melbourne 5.3	def.	Carlton 3.3	Port Melbourne Cricket Ground
Saturday, 13 July	South Melbourne 3.7	def.	Williamstown 0.6	South Melbourne Cricket Ground
	Bye; St Kilda

=== Round 11 ===
	Round 11
Saturday, 20 July	Essendon 10.5	def.	Geelong 5.15	East Melbourne Cricket Ground
Saturday, 20 July	Melbourne 6.11	def.	Port Melbourne 2.3	Melbourne Cricket Ground
Saturday, 20 July	Collingwood 2.3	drew with	Fitzroy 2.4	Victoria Park
Saturday, 20 July	North Melbourne 1.9	def. by	Richmond 2.8	North Melbourne Recreation Reserve
Saturday, 20 July	St Kilda 3.11	def. by	Footscray 5.4	St Kilda Cricket Ground
Saturday, 20 July	Carlton 6.5	def.	Williamstown 5.4	University Cricket Ground
	Bye; South Melbourne

=== Round 12 ===
	Round 12
Saturday, 27 July	Essendon 3.5	def.	Carlton 1.7	East Melbourne Cricket Ground
Saturday, 27 July	Melbourne 3.8	def. by	Geelong 9.9	Melbourne Cricket Ground (crowd: 20,000)
Saturday, 27 July	South Melbourne 7.7	def.	Footscray 2.1	South Melbourne Cricket Ground
Saturday, 27 July	Fitzroy 7.18	def.	St Kilda 2.5	Fitzroy Cricket Ground
Saturday, 27 July	North Melbourne 6.13	def.	Williamstown 2.0	North Melbourne Recreation Reserve
Saturday, 27 July	Richmond 6.4	drew with	Port Melbourne 6.8	Richmond Cricket Ground
	Bye; Collingwood

=== Round 13 ===
	Round 13
Saturday, 3 August	Footscray 4.1	def. by	Collingwood 5.10	Western Reserve
Saturday, 3 August	Melbourne 3.9	def.	St Kilda 2.7	Melbourne Cricket Ground
Saturday, 3 August	Essendon 2.7	def. by	North Melbourne 3.9	East Melbourne Cricket Ground
Saturday, 3 August	Carlton 3.4	def. by	South Melbourne 5.7	University Cricket Ground
Saturday, 3 August	Port Melbourne 2.14	def. by	Fitzroy 6.7	Port Melbourne Cricket Ground
Saturday, 3 August	Williamstown 4.19	def. by	Richmond 5.4	Williamstown Cricket Ground
	Bye; Geelong

=== Round 14 ===
	Round 14
Saturday, 10 August	St Kilda 5.10	def.	Carlton 1.10	St Kilda Cricket Ground
Saturday, 10 August	Richmond 4.9	def. by	Fitzroy 7.11	Richmond Cricket Ground
Saturday, 10 August	South Melbourne 6.9	def.	Geelong 3.12	South Melbourne Cricket Ground (crowd: 7,000)
Saturday, 10 August	Melbourne 4.2	def. by	Essendon 7.12	Melbourne Cricket Ground
Saturday, 10 August	Footscray 3.7	def. by	North Melbourne 4.7	Western Reserve
Saturday, 10 August	Collingwood 5.14	def.	Williamstown 1.9	Victoria Park
	Bye; Port Melbourne

=== Round 15 ===
	Round 15
Saturday, 17 August	Geelong 8.6	def.	Essendon 6.4	Corio Oval
Saturday, 17 August	Melbourne 2.4	def. by	Fitzroy 4.8	Melbourne Cricket Ground (crowd: 8,000)
Saturday, 17 August	North Melbourne 6.6	def.	South Melbourne 1.7	North Melbourne Recreation Reserve
Saturday, 17 August	Footscray 5.12	def.	Williamstown 3.5	Western Reserve
Saturday, 17 August	Port Melbourne 4.15	def.	St Kilda 3.3	Port Melbourne Cricket Ground
Saturday, 17 August	Richmond 5.4	def. by	Collingwood 7.11	Richmond Cricket Ground
	Bye; Carlton

=== Round 16 ===
	Round 16
Saturday, 24 August	Essendon 3.13	def. by	South Melbourne 6.15	East Melbourne Cricket Ground
Saturday, 24 August	North Melbourne 2.3	def. by	Melbourne 4.4	North Melbourne Recreation Reserve
Saturday, 24 August	Footscray 2.3	def. by	Fitzroy 5.8	Western Reserve
Saturday, 24 August	Collingwood 5.3	def.	Geelong 4.2	Victoria Park
Saturday, 24 August	St Kilda 7.7	def.	Richmond 6.8	St Kilda Cricket Ground
Saturday, 24 August	Carlton 3.3	def.	Port Melbourne 2.6	University Cricket Ground
	Bye; Williamstown

=== Round 17 ===
	Round 17
Saturday, 31 August	Fitzroy 4.13	def.	Geelong 2.4	Fitzroy Cricket Ground
Saturday, 31 August	South Melbourne 3.3	def. by	Melbourne 6.13	South Melbourne Cricket Ground
Saturday, 31 August	Collingwood 3.8	drew with	North Melbourne 3.3	Victoria Park
Saturday, 31 August	Essendon 4.11	def.	Footscray 3.3	East Melbourne Cricket Ground
Saturday, 31 August	Port Melbourne 8.8	def.	Richmond 2.8	Port Melbourne Cricket Ground
Saturday, 31 August	Williamstown 3.11	def.	Carlton 2.6	Williamstown Cricket Ground
	Bye; St Kilda

=== Round 18 ===
	Round 18
Saturday, 7 September	Fitzroy 5.5	drew with	Essendon 5.7	Fitzroy Cricket Ground (crowd: 10,000)
Saturday, 7 September	Geelong 4.9	def.	Melbourne 3.7	Corio Oval
Saturday, 7 September	Footscray 7.3	def.	South Melbourne 3.5	Western Reserve
Saturday, 7 September	Williamstown 6.5	def.	Port Melbourne 3.4	Williamstown Cricket Ground
Saturday, 7 September	Richmond 5.6	def.	Carlton 4.8	Richmond Cricket Ground
Saturday, 7 September	North Melbourne 9.7	def.	St Kilda 4.4	North Melbourne Recreation Reserve
	Bye; Collingwood

=== Round 19 ===
	Round 19
Saturday, 14 September	North Melbourne 6.2	def.	Essendon 4.6	North Melbourne Recreation Reserve
Saturday, 14 September	Footscray 5.8	def. by	Melbourne 7.9	Western Reserve
Saturday, 14 September	South Melbourne 3.5	drew with	Fitzroy 3.4	South Melbourne Cricket Ground
Saturday, 14 September	Port Melbourne 1.0	def.	Geelong 0.9	Port Melbourne Cricket Ground
Saturday, 14 September	St Kilda 4.7	def. by	Williamstown 7.9	St Kilda Cricket Ground
Saturday, 14 September	Collingwood 7.6	def.	Carlton 3.1	Victoria Park
	Bye; Richmond

=== Round 20 ===
	Round 20
Saturday, 21 September	Port Melbourne 7.9	def.	Richmond 5.3	Port Melbourne Cricket Ground
Saturday, 21 September	St Kilda 1.5	drew with	Carlton 1.10	Victoria Park
Saturday, 21 September	Williamstown 4.7	def. by	Collingwood 10.4	Williamstown Cricket Ground
	Bye; Essendon, Fitzroy, Footscray, Geelong, Melbourne, North Melbourne, South Melbourne

== Ladder ==
1895 VFA ladder
Pos	Team	Pld	W	L	D	GF	GA	Pts
1	Fitzroy (P)	18	12	1	5	77	47	58
2	Collingwood	18	12	4	2	83	63	52
2	Geelong	18	13	5	0	128	62	52
2	Melbourne	18	13	5	0	102	70	52
5	South Melbourne	18	9	7	2	84	82	40
6	Essendon	18	8	8	2	91	81	36
7	Port Melbourne	18	7	8	3	72	87	34
8	North Melbourne	18	7	10	1	64	75	30
9	Footscray	18	6	11	1	78	93	26
9	Williamstown	18	6	11	1	69	85	26
11	Carlton	18	5	11	2	55	77	24
12	Richmond	18	4	11	3	80	127	22
13	St Kilda	18	3	13	2	64	96	16

(P) Premiers

The Association had no formal tie-breakers in cases where clubs were equal on premiership points.

== Premiership ==
Fitzroy won the 1895 VFA premiership with 58 points, finishing six points clear of Geelong, Collingwood and Melbourne, who all finished equal-second on 52 points. While Fitzroy finished with fewer wins than either Geelong or Melbourne, and also scored 51 goals fewer than Geelong, it lost only one match for the season, and conceded 15 goals fewer than any other team. This was also the first ever premiership in the history of the Fitzroy Football Club.

Fitzroy was unbeaten in its last fourteen matches, coming from behind to claim the premiership from Geelong and Melbourne. Geelong, who had begun the season with a ten-match winning streak, and Melbourne, who had begun the season with an eight-match winning streak, were considered most likely to win the premiership at mid-season, but both teams' form fell off in the second half of the season to finish 13–5.

Fitzroy officially clinched the premiership in Round 19, its last match for the season, with a draw against South Melbourne: this, and Geelong's unusual 0.9 – 1.0 loss to Port Melbourne, ensured that Fitzroy could not be tied or passed for first place.

== Leading goalkickers ==
The leading goalkicker for the season was Decoit of Geelong, kicking 42 goals. He finished comfortably ahead of the second-placed Archie Smith of Collingwood. The high-scoring Geelong team produced three of the top five goalkickers for the season.

Player	Team	Goals
David Decoit	Geelong	42
Archie Smith	Collingwood	27
Jim Grace	Fitzroy	24
Eddy James	Geelong	24
Henry McShane	Geelong	20

== Notable events ==
- The round 3 match between North Melbourne and Port Melbourne at the North Melbourne Recreation Reserve was unusually scheduled for the same day and at the same venue as the third day's play of a pennant cricket match between North Melbourne and Fitzroy, which had been arranged at the end of the season to decide last place in the A Class division. The cricketers were forced to leave the field at 3pm to accommodate the footballers; the cricket match was awarded to Fitzroy and the North Melbourne Cricket Club was fined one shilling.
- Carlton won its round 9 match against North Melbourne by one goal after Langley marked on the final bell, and kicked a goal after the bell from 40 yards.

== Non-premiership matches ==
Association teams often played exhibition matches separate to the premiership season, particularly during bye weeks. This is not a complete list of all such matches, but is a selection of the most notable such games in 1895.

=== Charity Saturday ===
On the Saturday between Rounds 5 and 6, a charity event was held. Although the league had previously held charity days during the premiership season, this was the first time that the premiership season had been suspended entirely to accommodate the event. Two shortened matches, each lasting approximately one hour and played across two separate periods, were played as part of the event; two pairs of fierce rivals were selected to maximise interest in the matches. The charity event trialled the use of boundary umpires.

	Charity Saturday
Saturday, 8 June (3:00 pm)	Fitzroy 3.10	drew with	Collingwood 3.5	East Melbourne Cricket Ground (crowd: 7,000)
Saturday, 8 June (4:00 pm)	Melbourne 5.9	def.	Essendon 1.0	East Melbourne Cricket Ground (crowd: 7,000)

Additionally, a 130-yard sprint race, open to any Association players and run without handicap, was held. The race was won by Drew of Port Melbourne; Palmer of Essendon finished second and Morton of Footscray finished third.

=== Norwood's tour of Victoria ===
Norwood, the winners of the 1894 South Australian Football Association (SAFA) premiership, undertook a two-week tour of Victoria in May and June, playing five exhibition matches against Association clubs and a combined Ballarat team.

While Norwood finished with one win and two draws from the five matches, the tour proved to be a financial disaster for the club, as all five matches were poorly attended. With Norwood's share of the gate takings being a mere £30, the club lost £170 on the tour.

	Norwood's tour of Victoria
Friday, 24 May (11:00 am)	Essendon 7.12	def. by	Norwood 9.8	East Melbourne Cricket Ground
Tuesday, 28 May	Collingwood 3.2	drew with	Norwood 3.6	Victoria Park
Thursday, 30 May	South Melbourne 5.8	drew with	Norwood 5.5	South Melbourne Cricket Ground
Saturday, 1 June	Melbourne 8.13	def.	Norwood 6.9	Melbourne Cricket Ground
Monday, 3 June	Combined Ballarat 11.14	def.	Norwood 4.3	Saxon Paddock

=== Other notable matches ===
- On the Saturday prior to Round 1, the defending premiers Essendon played the traditional match against a combined team of juniors at the East Melbourne Cricket Ground. Essendon, fielding twenty players against the juniors' twenty-three, won by the score of 13.15 to 3.3.
- On Sunday, 30 September, premiers Fitzroy faced a Combined Ballarat team at Saxon Paddock. The Combined Ballarat team won by the score of 7.8 to 5.4.
