= George Angus (footballer) =

Australian rules footballer

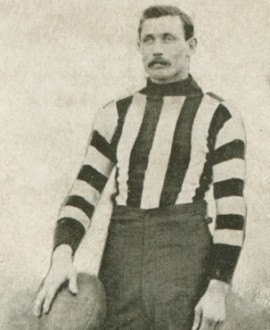
- Angus in 1910

Personal information
- Full name: George Angus
- Born: 15 April 1875; Kerang, Victoria
- Died: 16 November 1917 (aged 42); Prahran, Victoria
- Original team: Macorna Wanderers
- Height: 180 cm (5 ft 11 in)
- Weight: 85 kg (187 lb)

Playing career^{1}
Years	Club	Games (Goals)
1902–1911	Collingwood	157 (64)

Coaching career^{3}
Years	Club	Games (W–L–D)
1909–1911	Collingwood	60 (42–17–2)
- ^{1} Playing statistics correct to the end of 1911.^{3} Coaching statistics correct as of 1911.

Career highlights
- 3× VFL premiership player: 1902, 1903, 1910; Collingwood captain: 1910–1911

George Whitfield Angus (15 April 1875 – 16 November 1917) was an Australian rules footballer who played for and coached the Collingwood Football Club in the Victorian Football League (VFL).

Angus was a latecomer to the game, making his Collingwood debut at the age of 27 in 1902, having previously fought in the Boer War. He was a member of back-to-back premiership teams in 1902 and 1903. In 1910, Angus was appointed captain-coach of Collingwood and made an immediate impression, leading the club to a grand final victory over Carlton that year.

Angus was appointed captain-coach of Williamstown in the Victorian Football Association in 1912, playing 14 games and kicking 11 goals, before stepping down as captain as a result of illness following an 84-point loss at Brighton in round 15. He was replaced as captain by another former Collingwood player in Bert Reitman, but continued to coach the team for the rest of the season.
