= Bill Strickland (footballer, born 1864) =

Australian rules footballer and coach

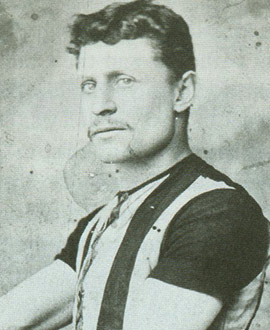
- Strickland during his Collingwood VFA career

Personal information
- Born: 17 August 1864; Sandhurst (Bendigo)
- Died: 24 November 1959 (aged 95); Sydney, New South Wales
- Original team: Brunswick
- Position: Centre

Playing career^{1}
Years	Club	Games (Goals)
1885–1888, 1890–1892	Carlton (VFA)	127 (4)
1893–1896	Collingwood (VFA)	69 (1)
1897	Collingwood	16 (0)
Total		212 (5)

Coaching career
Years	Club	Games (W–L–D)
1904, 1908	Collingwood	13 (8–5–0)
- ^{1} Playing statistics correct to the end of 1908.

Career highlights
- 1887 VFA Premiership player; 1896 VFA Premiership captain; Collingwood captain 1893-1897

William Strickland (17 August 1864 – 24 November 1959) was an Australian rules footballer who played for Collingwood in the inaugural Victorian Football League (VFL) season.

Strickland was a centreman and started his career with Brunswick before joining Victorian Football Association side Carlton in 1885, playing in their 1887 premiership side. He missed the 1889 season after rolling his ankle in a practice match, but returned in 1890 as club captain.

He would cross to new team Collingwood at the end of 1892 due to internal dissent and dissatisfaction at Carlton. After arriving at Collingwood, he became the club's captain, and in 1896 led the club to the VFA premiership after they defeated South Melbourne in a premiership play-off.

In 1897, he was Collingwood's first ever VFL captain, and also played his 200th career match, leading them to third place before retiring.

He returned to the VFL in 1904 as coach, and again briefly in 1908. He was also involved in Sydney Australian rules football for many years.

== Notes ==
- Bill Strickland's playing statistics from AFL Tables
- Bill Strickland at AustralianFootball.com
- Holmesby, Russell and Main, Jim (2007). The Encyclopedia of AFL Footballers. 7th ed. Melbourne: Bas Publishing.
- Blueseum biography
