= Charlie Tyson =

Australian rules footballer and coach

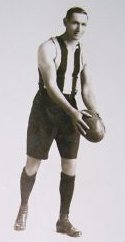

Personal information
- Full name: Charles Edward Tyson
- Born: 14 November 1897; St Arnaud, Victoria
- Died: 23 September 1985 (aged 87)
- Original team: Kalgoorlie Railways
- Height: 183 cm (6 ft 0 in)
- Weight: 81 kg (179 lb)

Playing career^{1}
Years	Club	Games (Goals)
1920–1926	Collingwood	106 (42)
1927–1929	North Melbourne	38 (38)
Total		144 (80)

Coaching career
Years	Club	Games (W–L–D)
1928–1929	North Melbourne	23 (5–18–0)
- ^{1} Playing statistics correct to the end of 1929.

Charles Edward Tyson (14 November 1897 – 23 September 1985) was an Australian rules footballer who played with Collingwood and North Melbourne in the Victorian Football League during the 1920s.

== VFL career ==
Recruited to Collingwood from Western Australian based Goldfields Football League side Kalgoorlie Railways, Tyson was a half back flanker and made his VFL debut in 1920. He was named club captain in 1924 and despite not making the finals in his first season in charge he led them to Grand Finals in the next two. It was in the 1926 VFL Grand Final that he found himself in significant controversy.

Collingwood lost the match to Melbourne by 57 points and Tyson was accused of 'playing dead'. To this day it is unclear whether the allegations hold water but what was known is that the Collingwood committee considered his relaxed and laid back demeanor as inappropriate for a club captain and were possibly looking for an excuse to get rid of him. Disgruntled with the allegations, Tyson received a clearance to move to North Melbourne for the 1927 VFL season. Tyson topped North Melbourne's goal kicking in his first season with the club and subsequently became captain-coach. He was re-appointed coach in 1929. North's committee were not impressed when their Captain-coach was injured paying in an midweek competition. Things came to a head and Tyson resigned his position. A month later Tyson sort and got a clearance to Yarraville.

In 1932 Tyson was appointed the coach of the Richmond second XVIII.

== Family ==
Tyson came from a leading Western Australian footballing family; his father Charles Snr, also played for Kalgoorlie Railways, as well as fellow Goldfields' club Coolgardie, and Western Australian Football League (WAFL) clubs East Fremantle and Midland Junction. Charles Sr also represented WA on three occasions, and had six brothers who all played football to a high standard:

- Edward with Kalgoorlie Railways, Victorian Football Association (VFA) club Prahran and the NSW state team;
- George (known as Tony), Kalgoorie Railways and WAFL clubs Perth and West Perth;
- Jock, Kalgoorlie Railways and South Australian National Football League (SANFL) club South Adelaide;
- Sam, Kalgoorlie Railways and WAFL clubs West Perth (coaching the club in 1931) and Midland Junction;
- Walter, Coolgardie and Kalgoorlie Railways.
- William, Kalgoorlie Railways.

Additionally, Sam's son Ted Tyson played for West Perth from 1930 to 1945, kicking 1203 goals.

== Sources ==
- Atkinson, G. (1982) Everything you ever wanted to know about Australian rules football but couldn't be bothered asking, The Five Mile Press: Melbourne. ISBN 0 86788 009 0.
