= Bert Reitman =

Australian rules footballer (1887–1973)

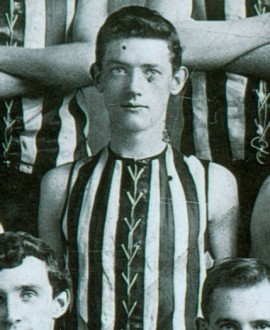
- Reitman in 1906

Personal information
- Full name: Albert Blagdon Reitman
- Born: 9 October 1887; Collingwood, Victoria
- Died: 12 May 1973 (aged 85); Williamstown, Victoria
- Original team: Clifton Hill Churches
- Height: 180 cm (5 ft 11 in)
- Weight: 72 kg (159 lb)

Playing career^{1}
Years	Club	Games (Goals)
1906–1907	Collingwood	12 (1)
1907–1914	Williamstown (VFA)	120 (10)

Representative team honours
Years	Team	Games (Goals)
1911	V.F.A.	3
- ^{1} Playing statistics correct to the end of 1914.

Albert Blagdon Reitman (9 October 1887 – 12 May 1973) was an Australian rules footballer who played for the Collingwood Football Club in the Victorian Football League (VFL), and for the Williamstown Football Club in the Victorian Football Association (VFA).

== Family ==
The son of Theodore "Fred" Reitman (1863-1934), and Effie Amelia Reitman (1865-1927), née Purling, Albert Blagdon Reitman was born in Collingwood, Victoria on 9 October 1887.

He married Gertrude Evelyn Marshall (1888-1970) in 1913.

== Football ==
One of the finest men who have [donned] a football guernsey, to wit, Bert Reitman, of the Williamstown club, has signified his intention of retiring. Always a fair and manly player, Bert was an ornament to the game, admired by all the players of other teams, and his loss will be very noticeable. The Flemington Spectator, 11 March 1915.

=== Collingwood (VFL) ===
He played his last senior match for Collingwood on 4 May 1907, against St Kilda.

=== Williamstown (VFA) ===
Cleared from Collingwood to the VFA team Williamstown, he played his first match for Williamstown, against Brunswick, on 25 May 1907.

He was captain-coach of Williamstown in 1913 and its captain in 1914.

== Recognition ==
He was made a life member of the Williamstown Football Club in 1915.

== Death ==
He died (suddenly) at his home in Williamstown on 12 May 1973.
