= Ian Graham (footballer, born 1943) =

Australian rules footballer

Personal information
- Full name: Ian Lawrence Graham
- Born: 5 January 1943 (age 83)
- Original team: Tongala / University Blacks
- Height: 187 cm (6 ft 2 in)
- Weight: 80 kg (176 lb)

Playing career^{1}
Years	Club	Games (Goals)
1963–66, 1969	Collingwood	63 (132)
- ^{1} Playing statistics correct to the end of 1969.

Ian Graham (born 5 January 1943) is a former Australian rules footballer who played with Collingwood in the Victorian Football League (VFL) during the 1960s.

His best season came in 1964 when he won the Copeland Trophy for Collingwood's Best and Fairest player. He finished the year by playing the Grand Final against Melbourne. In that game he kicked 1 goal, however Collingwood proceeded to lose the final by 4 points. He kicked 42 goals for the season, only bettered in 1966 when he managed 58 goals.
