= Brian Taylor (Australian footballer) =

Australian rules footballer (born 1962)

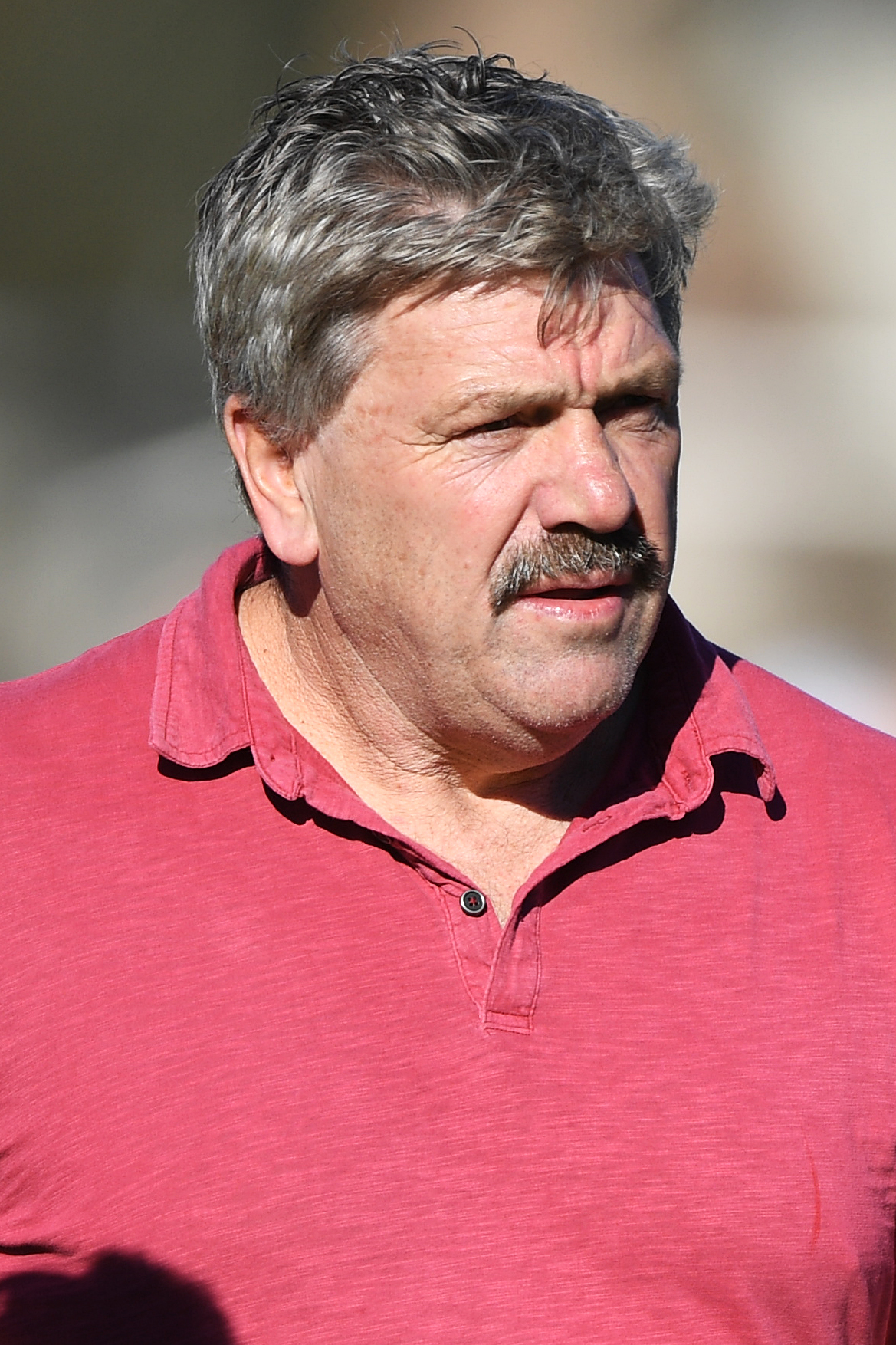
- Taylor in July 2019

Personal information
- Full name: Brian Wayne Taylor
- Nicknames: "BT", "Bristle", "Barge", "Roaming Brian", "The International Cool Breeze"
- Born: 10 April 1962 (age 64); Pinjarra, Western Australia
- Height: 191 cm (6 ft 3 in)
- Weight: 91 kg (201 lb)
- Position: Forward

Playing career^{1}
Years	Club	Games (Goals)
1980–1984	Richmond	43 (156)
1985–1990	Collingwood	97 (371)
Total		140 (527)

Representative team honours
Years	Team	Games (Goals)
1986	Victoria	1 (5)
- ^{1} Playing statistics correct to the end of 1990.

Career highlights
- Coleman Medal: 1986; 2× Richmond leading goalkicker: 1982, 1984; 5× Collingwood leading goalkicker: 1985–1989

Brian Wayne Taylor (born 10 April 1962) is a former Australian rules footballer and current Australian Football League (AFL) commentator on television for the Seven Network. He played with Richmond and Collingwood from 1980 to 1990.

== Playing career ==
Taylor was 16 when recruited from Mandurah, Western Australia, to the Richmond Football Club.

The moustached Taylor, known as "BT" and "Bristle", began his VFL career with Richmond in 1980. He was a full-forward, and he played 43 games and kicked 156 goals at Richmond. However, playing at the same club as prolific forward Michael Roach limited his senior playing opportunities; he was successful in the reserves grade, winning the VFL reserves leading goalkicker award in 1981 with 119 goals, but ultimately asked to be transferred to Collingwood after the 1984 season.

In 1985, Taylor joined Collingwood. He kicked 100 goals in 1986 to win the Coleman Medal. Due to repeated knee injuries, he retired from playing in the AFL at the end of the 1990 season at 28 years of age. He had played 97 games for Collingwood, kicking 371 goals.

Taylor has admitted that early in his career, he had a problem controlling his aggression and was involved in some physical, comical incidents.

In 1991 Taylor became playing coach of Prahran in the VFA. In 1992, after he had kicked 16 and 9 goals in the opening two rounds, his knee gave way and he retired from playing after finishing that season with 64 goals. Continuing as coach, he again took the Two Blues to the finals. He retired as coach shortly before the 1994 season due to media commitments.

== Statistics ==
Legend
G	Goals	K	Kicks	D	Disposals	T	Tackles
B	Behinds	H	Handballs	M	Marks

Led the league after season and finals

Season	Team	No.	Games	Totals							Averages (per game)						
Season	Team	No.	Games	G	B	K	H	D	M	T	G	B	K	H	D	M	T
1980	Richmond	21	1	0	0	2	1	3	0	—N/a	0.0	0.0	2.0	1.0	3.0	0.0	—N/a
1981	Richmond	21	5	5	5	14	7	21	10	—N/a	1.0	1.0	2.8	1.4	4.2	2.0	—N/a
1982	Richmond	21	15	71	25	110	23	133	78	—N/a	4.7	1.7	7.3	1.5	8.9	5.2	—N/a
1983	Richmond	21	6	19	16	41	23	64	33	—N/a	3.2	2.7	6.8	3.8	10.7	5.5	—N/a
1984	Richmond	21	16	61	44	125	24	149	90	—N/a	3.8	2.8	7.8	1.5	9.3	5.6	—N/a
1985	Collingwood	9	21	80	37	168	42	210	111	—N/a	3.8	1.8	8.0	2.0	10.0	5.3	—N/a
1986	Collingwood	9	20	100	63	192	36	228	135	—N/a	5.0	3.2	9.6	1.8	11.4	6.8	—N/a
1987	Collingwood	9	18	60	28	121	45	166	79	14	3.3	1.6	6.7	2.5	9.2	4.4	0.8
1988	Collingwood	9	21	73	38	136	37	173	104	10	3.5	1.8	6.5	1.8	8.2	5.0	0.5
1989	Collingwood	9	11	49	27	85	23	108	58	4	4.5	2.5	7.7	2.1	9.8	5.3	0.4
1990	Collingwood	9	6	9	6	21	7	28	12	2	1.5	1.0	3.5	1.2	4.7	2.0	0.3
Career			140	527	289	1015	268	1283	710	30	3.8	2.1	7.3	1.9	9.2	5.1	0.5

== Media career ==
Towards the end of his playing career, Taylor was approached to write a weekly column in the Sunday Herald newspaper. He kept a diary throughout the 1990 season, publishing it as Black and White: The Taylor Diaries.

On radio, Taylor started out with 3UZ in 1991 before becoming the lead commentator for the Triple M commentary team from 1997 when the station became the first FM radio station to broadcast Australian rules football matches.

In 2010, he joined 3AW's football commentary team as chief football caller, replacing Rex Hunt who had moved to Triple M to call football on Saturday afternoons. Taylor called the Friday night and either the Saturday or Sunday afternoon game for 3AW, alternating with Tony Leonard subject to commitments with the Seven Network. Taylor's five-year contract with 3AW ended at the conclusion of the 2014 football season and was not renewed. 3AW's General Manager, Shane Healy, stated that Taylor "would focus on his TV career and that 3AW would move forward in 2015 without his involvement". It was later confirmed Taylor would re-join Triple M to call Sunday matches. In 2016 he also appeared on The Saturday Rub alongside James Brayshaw, Danny Frawley and Damian Barrett.

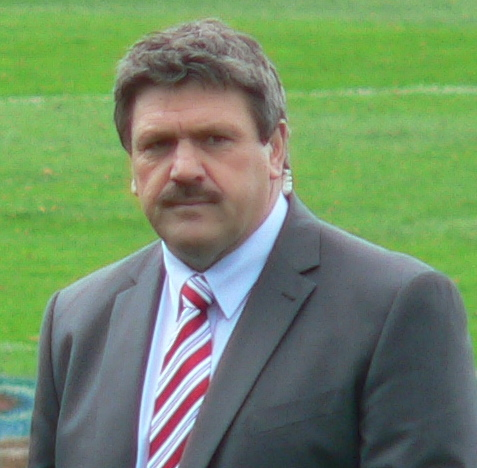
Taylor in 2010 working for Fox Sports.

On television, Taylor was an AFL commentator for the Nine Network from 2002 until the station lost the broadcasting rights in 2006 to the Seven Network, he mainly called Sunday matches with Brayshaw and Garry Lyon. He remained with the station as a panellist on The Sunday Footy Show until 2010 while also being the host of AFL Teams and calling a Sunday match on Fox Sports from 2009 to 2011.

From the start of the 2012 season, Taylor started calling Saturday night matches for the Seven Network and remained in the role until the end of the 2016 season.

In 2017, Taylor replaced the retiring Dennis Cometti joining Bruce McAvaney as a commentator of the marquee Friday night timeslot while also doing Sunday afternoon games for Seven, while remaining calling Saturday afternoon games for Triple M. Taylor also called the AFL Grand Final for Seven following the timeslot change.

Also in 2017, Taylor started a segment during the Channel Seven coverage called "Roaming Brian". During this live segment he roves around in the winning teams' change rooms collecting ad-lib interviews with players. Often catching them off-guard, Taylor manages to get some candid, off-the-cuff comments from players, coaches, relatives, and other AFL identities, which provide some entertaining moments for viewers. Players are usually willing to be interviewed, though in 2018 he was rebuffed by Richmond's Toby Nankervis.

Since 2025, Taylor began calling Thursday night matches alongside Hamish McLachlan after being moved from working on Friday night matches which since 2021 he called with James Brayshaw but remained on Sunday afternoon working with mainly Alister Nicholson. He also calls Friday night and Saturday afternoon games on Triple M, the latter with his long time calling partner Brayshaw.

== Controversy ==
On 12 July 2014, during the Seven Network's Saturday Night Football preview, Taylor called Geelong player Harry Taylor a "big poofter" – a colloquial, homophobic slur. The incident was widely condemned and Taylor apologised at half time. He was stood down from his role of broadcasting a match the following afternoon on radio station 3AW.
