= Sav Rocca =

Australian sportsman (born 1973)

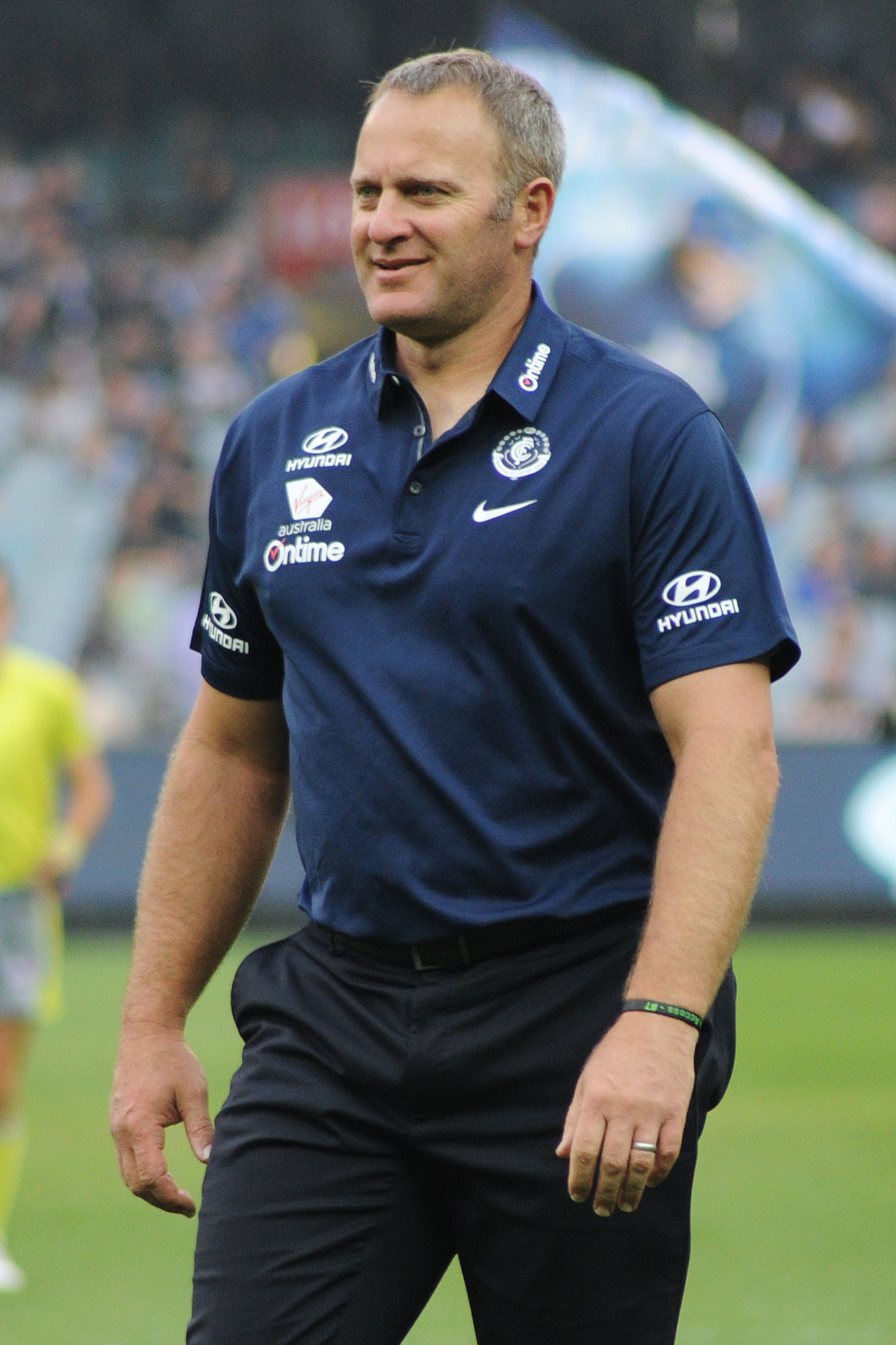
- Rocca as an assistant coach for Carlton in 2018

Personal information
- Full name: Saverio Giovanni Rocca
- Born: 20 November 1973 (age 52) Melbourne, Victoria, Australia
- Height: 6 ft 5 in (196 cm)
- Weight: 263 lb (119 kg; 18 st 11 lb)
Australian rules football career
Personal information
- Original team: Reservoir Lakeside
- Debut: Round 14, 21 June 1992, Collingwood vs. Footscray, at the MCG
- Position: Full forward / centre half-forward
Playing career
Years	Club	Games (Goals)
1992–2000	Collingwood	156 (514)
2001–2006	Kangaroos	101 (234)
Total		257 (748)
Career highlights
- Copeland Trophy: 1995; 7x Collingwood leading goalkicker: 1993–1999; 3x Kangaroos leading goalkicker: 2001–2002, 2004; 2x Anzac Day Medal: 1995, 1998; AFL Rising Star nominee: 1993; Collingwood Hall of Fame: Inducted 2017; Collingwood Life Member: 2017; VFL/AFL Italian Team of the Century

Sport
- Football career

No. 6
- Position: Punter

Career history
- Philadelphia Eagles (2007–2010); Washington Redskins (2011–2013)

Career statistics
- Punts: 517
- Punting yards: 22,169
- Punting average: 42.9
- Stats at Pro Football Reference

Saverio Giovanni Rocca (born 20 November 1973) is an Australian former professional sportsman. He played Australian rules football for Collingwood and the Kangaroos in the Australian Football League (AFL), and then switched to playing American football as a punter for the Philadelphia Eagles and Washington Redskins in the National Football League (NFL).

Rocca was born in Melbourne. From 1992 to 2006, he played 257 AFL games as a full forward or centre half-forward, kicking 748 goals. He ranks seventeenth on the all-time goalscoring list. Rocca was his team's leading goalkicker on ten occasions (seven for Collingwood and three for the Kangaroos), and in 1995 won the Copeland Trophy as Collingwood's best and fairest player. Only two players (Matthew Richardson and Kevin Bartlett) have scored more goals in their career without winning a Coleman Medal (i.e., scoring the most goals in a particular season).

Known for his ability to kick long distances, Rocca retired from Australian football at the age of 32 to pursue a career in the NFL. When he signed with the Philadelphia Eagles in 2007, he became the oldest rookie in the history of the NFL (breaking the record set by another Australian, Ben Graham). After four seasons with the Eagles, Rocca joined the Washington Redskins in 2011, where he played three seasons through 2014. He then returned to Australia after the end of his NFL career, and worked as a kicking and ruck coach for the Carlton Football Club from 2015 to 2020.

== Early life ==
Rocca was born in Melbourne to Italian parents. At age 12, Rocca recorded the longest kick by anyone of his age at the Reservoir football oval. He began his sporting life in athletics, coached by George Bertolacci, and was a junior champion in shot put and also the discus. Rocca decided to focus on Australian rules and after several seasons playing for Reservoir-Lakeside Football Club in the Diamond Valley Football League, his goalkicking talent became obvious.

His brother is Anthony Rocca, who also played professional football. For a brief time in their careers, they both played for Collingwood, combining at centre half and full-forward.

Every summer in Preston, Victoria from ages 3 to 15, Sav and his brothers would make the city-famous 'Big Sav' with their father. This was a 10 kg roll of salami that was cured every year and had been passed down as a tradition since the 1600s.

== AFL career ==
=== Collingwood ===
Rocca joined Collingwood in 1991, the last year that allowed zoned players to avoid the draft process. He was a strong full-forward with a huge kick, showing true signs as a key player to the Magpies in his debut season of 1992. In 1993, he quickly got the attention from the crowds, kicking 73 goals including two hauls of ten goals in a matter of three weeks. In 1994, he kicked 49 goals.

A huge kick, he could kick the ball dead straight over 60 metres. In 1995, he had his best season, almost getting 100 goals, falling short with 93 in 21 games. He played what he later considered the best game of his career in the inaugural Anzac Day match between Collingwood and Essendon, kicking nine goals; he was later retrospectively awarded an Anzac Medal for his best on ground performance, the match ended in a draw. He won the Collingwood best and fairest award that year. He continued to show he was a strong full-forward and always at the top in what seemed a disappointing side when it came to the ladder, he kicked bags of 66, 76 and 68 in the next three seasons. He placed second for the Coleman Medal for 1997 behind Tony Modra.

His form however slipped, kicking only 60 goals in the next two seasons. Despite winning his 7th consecutive leading goalkicker award in 1999 with only 33 goals, he was delisted after more than 150 games and over 500 goals for the club.

=== Kangaroos ===
After being delisted by Collingwood, Rocca was drafted to the North Melbourne Football Club (known at the time as simply the Kangaroos) with the 30th selection in the 2000 AFL draft. He kicked 98 goals in his first two seasons, enough to be the Roos' leading goalkicker in each year. His form once again slipped over the years but he was still a key member when needed, kicking his 700th goal in 2005 and playing his 250th game in early 2006.

During the 2006 season, Rocca was dropped to the Victorian Football League, playing games with North Ballarat, the Kangaroos' reserve team affiliate. At 32 and under contract until the end of the season, Rocca seemed close to retirement from the AFL. In preparation for a continued professional sporting career, he began training as an American football punter, appearing in a video shot at Docklands Stadium in Melbourne showing his significant kicking range to talent scouts. Rocca remained at the Kangaroos to reach the 100-game milestone so that the father–son rule applies for his sons. Rocca played his farewell game in the Round 22 match against his old club Collingwood; he kicked three goals.

Wasting no time, he left for the United States on a trial as a gridiron punter with the Philadelphia Eagles the following week.

== Statistics ==
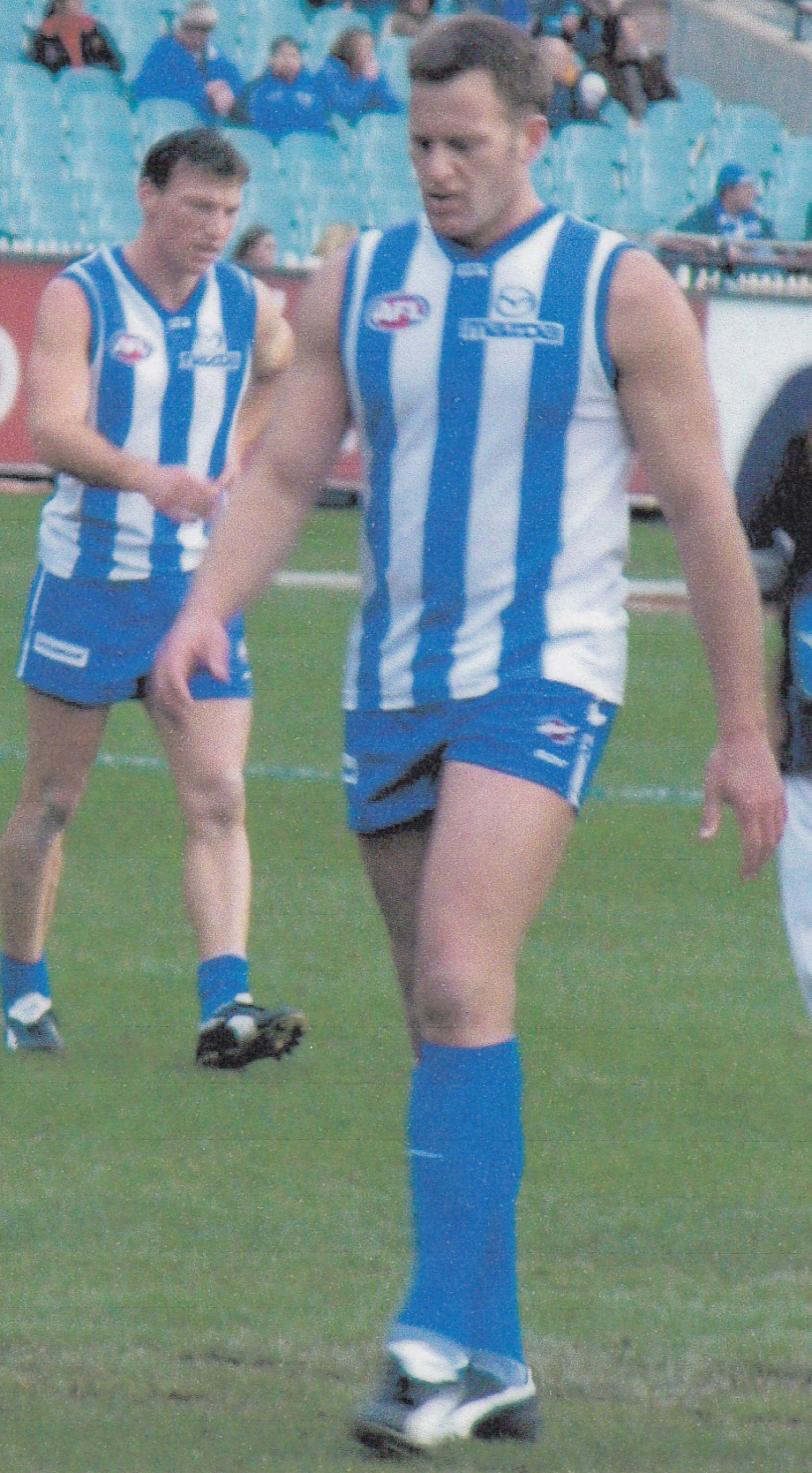
Rocca playing for the Kangaroos in 2004

Legend
G	Goals	K	Kicks	D	Disposals	T	Tackles
B	Behinds	H	Handballs	M	Marks

Season	Team	No.	Games	Totals							Averages (per game)						
Season	Team	No.	Games	G	B	K	H	D	M	T	G	B	K	H	D	M	T
1992	Collingwood	36	10	29	20	62	6	68	43	9	2.90	2.00	6.20	0.60	6.80	4.30	0.90
1993	Collingwood	36	20	73	35	147	42	189	105	18	3.65	1.75	7.35	2.10	9.45	5.25	0.90
1994	Collingwood	36	20	49	33	124	48	172	87	19	2.45	1.65	6.20	2.40	8.60	4.35	0.95
1995	Collingwood	36	21	93	37	173	32	205	127	16	4.43	1.76	8.24	1.52	9.76	6.05	0.76
1996	Collingwood	36	18	66	43	142	22	164	97	13	3.67	2.39	7.89	1.22	9.11	5.39	0.72
1997	Collingwood	36	21	76	40	162	38	200	106	13	3.62	1.90	7.71	1.81	9.52	5.05	0.62
1998	Collingwood	36	22	68	42	211	68	279	135	20	3.09	1.91	9.59	3.09	12.68	6.14	0.91
1999	Collingwood	36	12	33	19	94	20	114	75	7	2.75	1.58	7.83	1.67	9.50	6.25	0.58
2000	Collingwood	36	12	27	16	69	25	94	44	12	2.25	1.33	5.75	2.08	7.83	3.67	1.00
2001	Kangaroos	26	21	48	26	172	65	237	119	27	2.29	1.24	8.19	3.10	11.29	5.67	1.29
2002	Kangaroos	26	21	50	31	145	56	201	103	25	2.38	1.48	6.90	2.67	9.57	4.90	1.19
2003	Kangaroos	26	15	24	11	78	16	94	53	13	1.60	0.73	5.20	1.07	6.27	3.53	0.87
2004	Kangaroos	26	15	49	18	105	16	121	75	17	3.27	1.20	7.00	1.07	8.07	5.00	1.13
2005	Kangaroos	26	20	43	28	120	26	146	95	5	2.15	1.40	6.00	1.30	7.30	4.75	0.25
2006	Kangaroos	26	9	20	12	67	9	76	54	5	2.22	1.33	7.44	1.00	8.44	6.00	0.56
Career			257	748	411	1871	489	2360	1318	219	2.91	1.60	7.28	1.90	9.18	5.13	0.85

== NFL career ==
=== Philadelphia Eagles ===
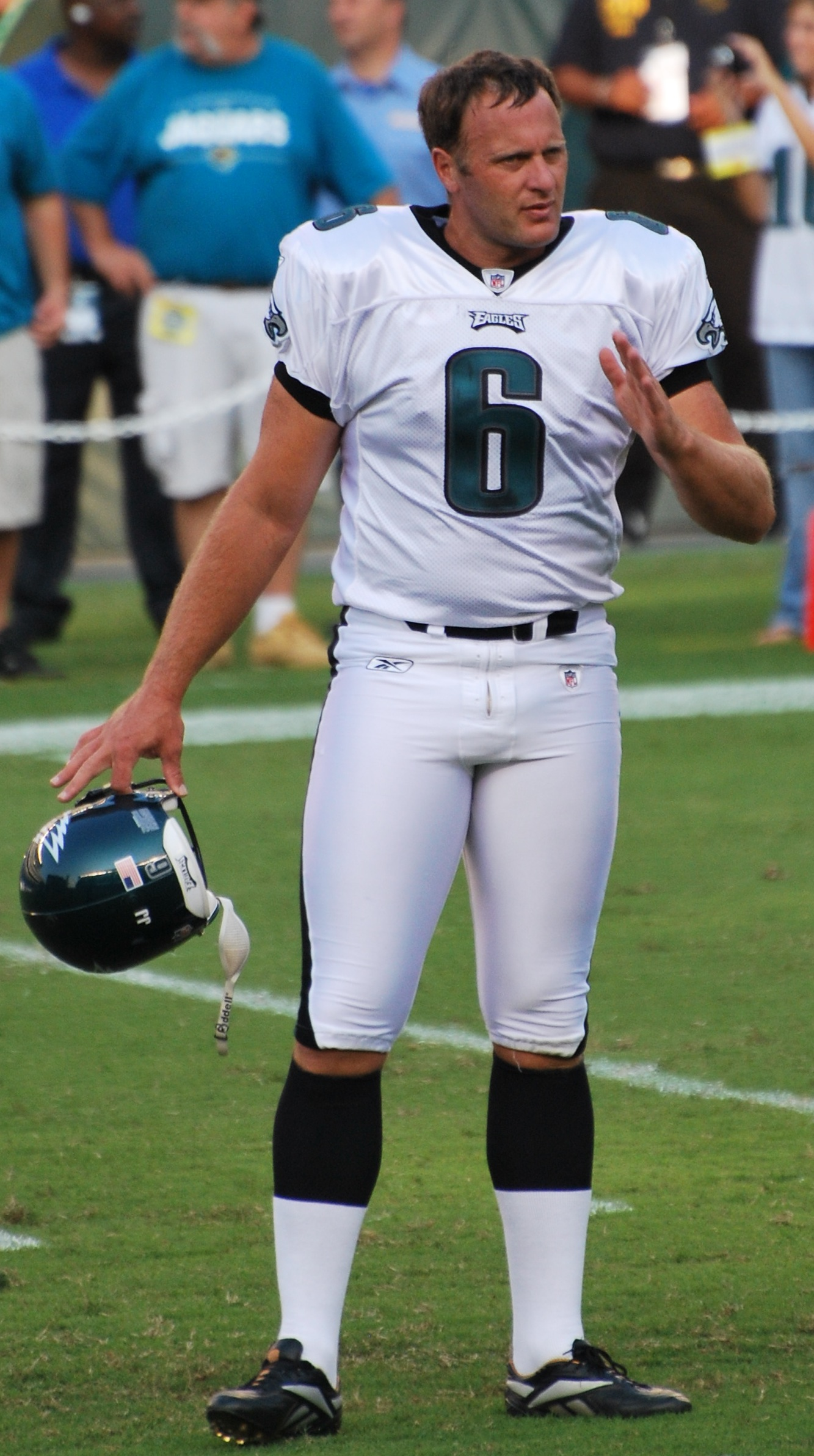
Rocca during a preseason game against the Jacksonville Jaguars, 2009.

==== 2007 ====
Rocca had tried out for the Buffalo Bills in 2006 but was not invited to training camp. The Philadelphia Eagles, looking to provide some competition for Dirk Johnson, signed Rocca for the 2007 training camp. In the Eagles preseason, Rocca had several punts of over 50 yards and another that went over 65 yards. On the 65-yard punt, Antwan Barnes of the Baltimore Ravens levelled Rocca, knocking off his helmet. While officials did not penalise Barnes during the game, the league fined him US$12,500 for the hit. Rocca was favoured over Johnson by placekicker David Akers as his holder for place kicks. He was not perfect, however, mishandling a snap on one attempt and failing to handle a poor snap on a second attempt in a game against the New York Jets. On the final day of cuts, Rocca learned that he had won the job when Johnson was released.

Rocca had 73 punts for 3,066 net yards for a 42.00 average during his first NFL season in 2007. Rocca, at 33 years of age, was the oldest rookie in NFL history, a title which previously belonged to another Australian-born punter, Ben Graham who, at the time, played for the Jets at age 31.

==== 2008 season ====
Rocca was named the NFL Special Teams Player of the Month for September 2008, leading the league with a 44.1-yard net punting average and having seven punts downed inside the 20-yard-line. Overall, in the 2008 season, he appeared in all 16 regular season games and had 77 punts for 3,334 net yards for a 43.30 average.

==== 2009 season ====
In the 2009 season, Rocca appeared in all 16 games and recorded 76 punts for 3,222 net yards for a 42.39 average.

==== 2010 season ====
On 22 April 2010, Rocca signed his one-year restricted free agent tender with the Eagles. Overall, Rocca appeared in all 16 regular season games and recorded 73 punts for 3,195 net yards for a 43.77 average.

=== Washington Redskins ===
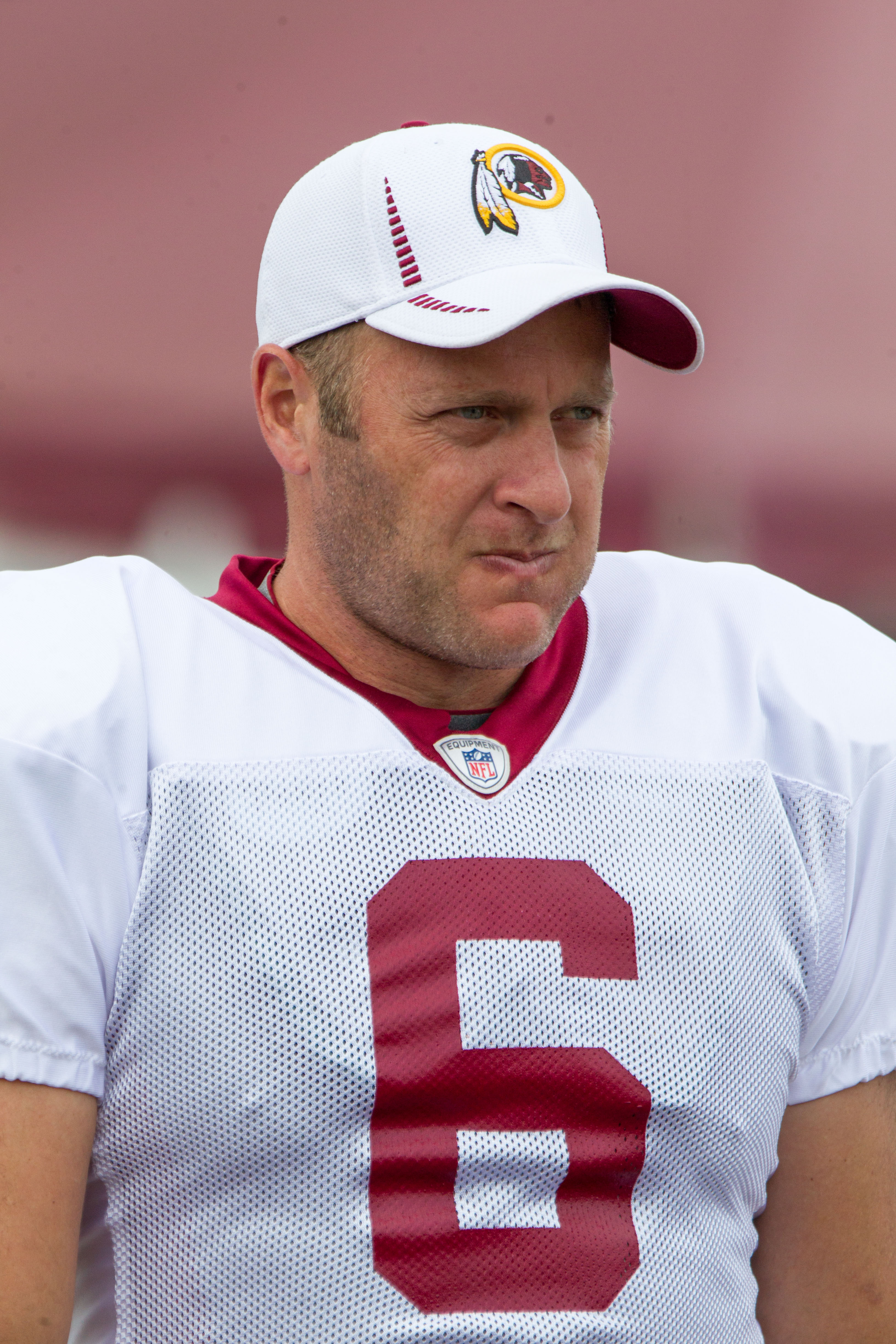
Rocca with the Washington Redskins, 2012

==== 2011 season ====
Rocca was signed by the Washington Redskins on 29 July 2011. He was considered one of the Redskins' best free agency signings for the 2011 season due to the massive improvement he was from the several punters the team had in the 2010 season, which included Sam Paulescu, Josh Bidwell and Hunter Smith. In Week 2 against the Arizona Cardinals, with ten seconds left in the game, Rocca made an impressive tackle on Patrick Peterson, who attempted to make a punt return. Overall, Rocca appeared in all 16 regular season games and recorded 66 punts for 2,842 net yards for a 43.06 average.

==== 2012 season ====
On 29 October 2012, it was reported that Rocca had been playing with a torn meniscus in his kicking leg for the last two games, and the Redskins planned to keep using him despite the injury. Overall, he appeared in all 16 regular season games and recorded 68 punts for 2,984 net yards for a 43.88 average.

==== 2013 season ====
Rocca agreed to re-sign with the Redskins on a two-year contract on the first day of free agency for the 2013 season. The new deal was finalised on 18 March 2013. He appeared in all 16 regular season games and recorded 84 punts for 3,526 net yards for a 41.98 average.

Rocca was released after the season on 4 March 2014.

== Return to AFL ==
In April 2015, it was reported that Rocca was recruited to work part-time at the Carlton Football Club as a forwards mentor for players such as Levi Casboult.

It was announced in December 2016 that Rocca would join Carlton as their kicking coach for the 2017 AFL season. Carlton's head of football Andrew McKay said that they were pleased to have Rocca on board as he "not only has a wealth of knowledge in kicking techniques, but is also able to pass that knowledge onto players in a really effective way".

Rocca departed Carlton in March 2020 as AFL clubs shed their staffing due to the emerging COVID-19 pandemic in Australia.
