= Archie Smith (footballer, born 1872) =

Australian rules footballer

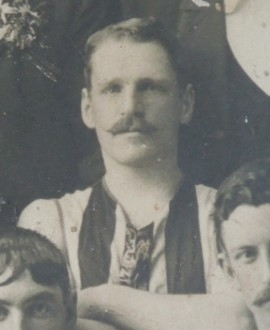
- Smith in 1901

Personal information
- Full name: Arthur Robert Smith
- Nickname: Snapper
- Born: 16 February 1872; Prahran, Victoria
- Died: 20 July 1961 (aged 89); Abbotsford, Victoria
- Original team: Richmond (VFA)
- Height: 178 cm (5 ft 10 in)
- Weight: 72 kg (159 lb)
- Position: Forward

Playing career^{1}
Years	Club	Games (Goals)
1892–1902	Collingwood	176 (205)
- ^{1} Playing statistics correct to the end of 1902.

Career highlights
- VFA premiership: 1896; VFL leading goalkicker: 1898; 7x Collingwood leading goalkicker: 1892, 1894–1895, 1897–1900

Arthur Robert Smith (16 February 1872 – 20 July 1961) was an Australian rules footballer who played for the Collingwood Football Club in the years leading up to and following the formation of the Victorian Football League (VFL).

== Playing career ==
Smith, who was recruited from Richmond, was Collingwood's main target up forward during his career. He made his VFL debut in Collingwood's inaugural VFL game, against St Kilda in round one, 1897, and went on to top the club goal-kicking in each of his first four seasons. Smith's tally of 31 goals in 1898 was enough to win the VFL Leading Goalkicker Medal. Although he wasn't the most prolific forward for Collingwood in 1901, his 30 goals helped his club reach the 1901 VFL grand final, where they lost to Essendon.

Smith's career total of 205 goals was a club record until broken by Dick Lee in 1910.
