= Wal Gillard =

Australian rules footballer (1874–1931)

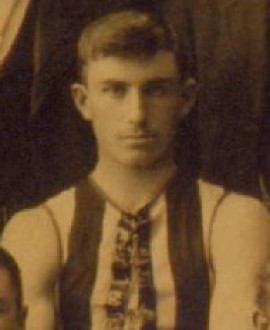
- Gillard in 1896 during his Collingwood VFA career

Personal information
- Full name: Walter Worthy Gillard
- Born: 10 July 1874; Ballarat East, Victoria
- Died: 8 October 1931 (aged 57); Clifton Hill, Victoria
- Original team: Collingwood Juniors
- Height: 178 cm (5 ft 10 in)
- Weight: 76 kg (168 lb)

Playing career^{1}
Years	Club	Games (Goals)
1896–1899	Collingwood	55 (33)
- ^{1} Playing statistics correct to the end of 1899.

Walter Worthy Gillard (10 July 1874 – 8 October 1931) was an Australian rules footballer who played with Collingwood in the Victorian Football League (VFL).
