= Terry Waters =

Australian rules footballer (1943–2020)

Personal information
- Born: 14 December 1943
- Died: 27 July 2020 (aged 76)
- Original team: Dandenong (VFA)
- Height: 188 cm (6 ft 2 in)
- Weight: 85 kg (187 lb)

Playing career^{1}
Years	Club	Games (Goals)
1961-1962, 1968	Dandenong	35 (76)
1963-1972	Collingwood	163 (182)
Total		198 (258)
- ^{1} Playing statistics correct to the end of 1972.

Career highlights
- Collingwood best and fairest 1966; Collingwood captain 1970–71; Collingwood leading goalkicker: 1963–64; Collingwood Life Member (1972); All-Australian 1969

Terry Waters (14 December 1943 – 27 July 2020) was an Australian rules footballer who played with Collingwood in the Victorian Football League (VFL).

Originally from Victorian Football Association (VFA) club Dandenong, Waters' transfer application to Collingwood was originally denied by Dandenong and he was required to go to the Supreme Court of Victoria to have writs issued to allow him to make his VFL debut in 1963.

Waters was a versatile player who was originally used as a ruck/forward before moving into defence later in his career. He was known as a reliable mark of the ball in dry or wet conditions. He won the Copeland Trophy for being Collingwood's best and fairest player in 1966, was their leading goalkicker in 1963 and 1964 and earned All Australian selection for his performance at the 1969 Adelaide Carnival.

Waters was appointed captain of Collingwood in 1970. In 1971, after suffering a series of injuries that caused him to miss seven games then he struggled with his form, he resigned the position midway through the season, reasoning that the responsibility associated with the captaincy had affected his form.

Waters attended school at De La Salle College Malvern.

Waters died in July 2020, aged 76.
