= Peter McKenna (Australian footballer) =

Australian rules footballer, born 1946

Personal information
- Born: 27 August 1946 (age 80); Heidelberg West, Victoria, Australia
- Original team: West Heidelberg YCW
- Height: 191 cm (6 ft 3 in)
- Weight: 87 kg (192 lb)

Playing career^{1}
Years	Club	Games (Goals)
1965–1975	Collingwood	180 (838)
1976	Devonport Magpies	17 (79)
1977	Carlton	11 (36)
1978	Geelong West	13 (67)
1979	Port Melbourne	14 (52)
1980	Northcote	15 (75)
Total		250 (1147)
- ^{1} Playing statistics correct to the end of 1977.

Career highlights
- Copeland Trophy: 1970; 8× Collingwood leading goalkicker: 1967–1974; All-Australian: 1972; Coleman Medal: 1972, 1973; Inducted into the Australian Football Hall of Fame: 1999

Peter McKenna (born 27 August 1946) is a former Australian rules footballer who represented Collingwood and Carlton in the Victorian Football League (VFL) during the 1960s and 1970s. He also represented Devonport in the North West Football Union (NWFU), and Northcote, Port Melbourne and Geelong West in the Victorian Football Association (VFA).

Regarded as one of the best full-forwards to ever play the game, McKenna holds the VFL/AFL record for the longest sequence of matches in which he scored at least one goal: 121 matches. A moptop hairstyle, genial grin, and a gift for taking chest-high marks won McKenna adulation in the 1960s and 1970s as the game's first multimedia star. He continued his involvement in the game as a commentator with the Seven Network during the 1980s and 1990s.

== Playing career ==
McKenna was the second of five children to Winnie and Kevin McKenna. He grew up supporting Essendon and played soccer until he was 13.

Recruited from West Heidelberg YCW, McKenna credited Collingwood coach Bob Rose for patiently helping to shape him into the champion footballer he was to become. In the opening round of the 1966 VFL season against Hawthorn at Victoria Park, McKenna gave a glimpse of what was to come when he kicked 12 goals in a match-winning effort, the first of thirteen occasions when he would kick ten or more goals in a game. However, McKenna's form dropped away; and, after being held goalless against North Melbourne in round 6, he was dropped for the remainder of the season. He went on to be the VFL reserves leading goalkicker that season, with 46 goals.

McKenna kicked 47 goals in 1967, leading Collingwood's goalkicking for the first time. He went on to win that award for eight consecutive seasons, including in 1969 and 1971 when he kicked 143 and 134 goals, respectively. From the start of the 1968 VFL season to round 3, 1974, McKenna kicked at least one goal in 121 consecutive games, still a VFL/AFL record as of 2024.

McKenna was noted for his use of the drop punt as his preferred kick for goalkicking. Although the drop punt had been in use since the 1930s, McKenna's accuracy and distance with the kick, at a time when most forwards still used the flat punt for shots longer than 30 metres, made him one of the first great exponents of the kicking style and helped to popularise it.

Collingwood played in two grand finals during McKenna's career, 1966 and 1970, both of which Collingwood lost. McKenna did not play in the former match. In the latter game, he was concussed in a collision with teammate Des Tuddenham before half time which contributed to Collingwood giving up a 44-point half-time lead.

In 1972 and 1973, McKenna was the VFL leading goalkicker, kicking 130 in 1972 and 86 in 1973. In 1972, he was also named All-Australian for his performance in the 1972 Perth Carnival for Victoria.

At the end of round 10, 1975, McKenna led Collingwood's goalkicking list with a modest total of 26 goals, but the following week he had a poor game in which he was held goalless in the round 11 Queen's Birthday match against Melbourne. This performance saw him and a number of teammates in round 12 dropped to the reserves against South Melbourne Football Club at VFL Park in which he suffered a kidney injury – he did not play for Collingwood again after that.

In 1976, McKenna played with the Devonport Magpies in Tasmania's North West Football Union (NWFU). He played a solitary season for Devonport and kicked 79 goals in 17 games.

McKenna returned to the VFL in 1977 to play for Collingwood's bitter rival, Carlton, kicking 36 goals in 11 games. He left Carlton after one season and then spent three years in the Victorian Football Association (VFA), playing one year with each of Geelong West (67 goals) and Port Melbourne (51 goals), where he was captain/coach, and Northcote (75 goals).

Altogether, McKenna's VFL record of 874 goals from 191 games was enough to place him as the league's fourth-highest goalkicker at the time of his retirement, behind only Gordon Coventry, Doug Wade and Jack Titus; as of the end of the 2023 AFL season, he sat tenth on the all-time league leaderboard. He has scored the most goals of any player to finish his career with fewer than 200 VFL/AFL games, and his goals-per-game average of 4.58 is the fifth-highest of all time.

=== Other matches ===
In the VFL, McKenna also scored 19 goals in five night series matches - 15 in two games for Collingwood and four in three games for Carlton - as well as 42 goals in seven interstate football matches for Victoria. If these are considered, then McKenna played 203 career senior games and kicked 935 career senior goals in elite Australian rules football (the VFL/AFL, WAFL and SANFL). The VFL/AFL list McKenna's total as 198 career senior games and 916 career senior goals, excluding his night series matches for Collingwood and Carlton.

McKenna kicked 79 goals in 17 games for Devonport in the NWFU in 1976, as well as one goal for the NWFU in one intrastate match, and also kicked 194 goals in 42 VFA matches in 1978-1980, along with 23 goals in three night series matches for Northcote in 1980.

If the NWFU and the post-1896 VFA/VFL are considered, then McKenna played a total of 266 senior career games and kicked 1232 senior career goals.

McKenna also played 26 VFL reserves matches and kicked 95 goals: if these are considered, then he played 292 overall career matches and kicked 1327 overall career goals, including 222 career matches and 988 career goals across the VFL in seniors, reserves and night series matches.

== VFL statistics ==
Legend
G	Goals	K	Kicks	D	Disposals	T	Tackles
B	Behinds	H	Handballs	M	Marks

Led the league for the season only
Led the league after finals only
Led the league after season and finals

Season	Team	No.	Games	Totals							Averages (per game)						
Season	Team	No.	Games	G	B	K	H	D	M	T	G	B	K	H	D	M	T
1965	Collingwood	15	12	21	12	110	15	125	47	—N/a	1.8	1.0	9.2	1.3	10.4	3.9	—N/a
1966	Collingwood	6	6	20	11	64	19	83	40	—N/a	3.3	1.8	10.7	3.2	13.8	6.7	—N/a
1967	Collingwood	6	16	47	33	186	21	207	96	—N/a	2.9	2.1	11.6	1.3	12.9	6.0	—N/a
1968	Collingwood	6	15	64	34	145	14	159	81	—N/a	4.3	2.3	9.7	0.9	10.6	5.4	—N/a
1969	Collingwood	6	19	98	55	241	24	265	125	—N/a	5.2	2.9	12.7	1.3	13.9	6.6	—N/a
1970	Collingwood	6	22	143	80	294	32	326	164	—N/a	6.5	3.6	13.4	1.5	14.8	7.5	—N/a
1971	Collingwood	6	22	134	79	282	32	314	159	—N/a	6.1	3.6	12.8	1.5	14.3	7.2	—N/a
1972	Collingwood	6	20	130	53	225	23	248	132	—N/a	6.5	2.7	11.3	1.2	12.4	6.6	—N/a
1973	Collingwood	6	20	86	42	179	17	196	113	—N/a	4.3	2.1	9.0	0.9	9.8	5.7	—N/a
1974	Collingwood	6	18	69	34	138	14	152	85	—N/a	3.8	1.9	7.7	0.8	8.4	4.7	—N/a
1975	Collingwood	6	10	26	14	59	11	70	31	—N/a	2.6	1.6	6.6	1.2	7.8	3.4	—N/a
1977	Carlton	27	11	36	23	89	10	99	41	—N/a	3.3	2.1	8.1	0.9	9.0	3.7	—N/a
Career			191	874	470	2012	232	2244	1114	—N/a	4.6	2.5	10.6	1.2	11.8	5.9	—N/a

== Life off the football field ==
During his football career, he recorded his first pop single Things to Remember, written by Melbourne singer/songwriter Colin Buckley. This was followed by another single Smile, written by Johnny Young.

In 1969, he was a teacher at Fairfield State Primary.

In the late 1970s and early 1980s he taught at Marcellin College Junior campus in Camberwell.

McKenna appeared regularly on television at this time, being Daryl Somers' co-host of Hey Hey It's Saturday for the show's first eight weeks in late 1971, and continuing to appear after Ossie Ostrich had replaced him as co-host. There were also appearances on shows such as Young Talent Time and Happening '72.

In 1973, he published a book describing his life and career to date, and his thoughts on the VFL and Australian football in general. The book was co-written with Phillip Burfurd and published in the Jack Pollard Sportsmaster range of titles. My World Of Football was subtitled "The candid, provocative innermost thoughts and technical secrets of an Australian football hero".

After his football career had ended, McKenna commentated football with the Seven Network until Seven lost the rights to broadcast AFL matches after the 2001 AFL season. He then worked in radio and as a part-time goalkicking coach at Collingwood until May 2004 when it was announced that McKenna would begin working as a ministerial transport officer (chauffeur) for the Parliament of Victoria.

In September 2007, in an attempt to boost public awareness and support for epilepsy sufferers and their families, McKenna opened up about the three deaths in his family that had impacted him deeply over the years; those of his older sister Marie, who died after suffering an epileptic seizure just days out from McKenna's 21st birthday, and father Kevin and brother Gerard(drowned in bath) from diabetes-related illnesses.

McKenna is married with two daughters and two grandsons.

== Bibliography ==
- Atkinson, G. (1982) Everything you ever wanted to know about Australian rules football but couldn't be bothered asking, The Five Mile Press: Melbourne. ISBN 0 86788 009 0.
- My World Of Football, Peter McKenna with Phillip Burfurd, 1973.
