= Dick Lee (Australian footballer) =

Australian rules footballer

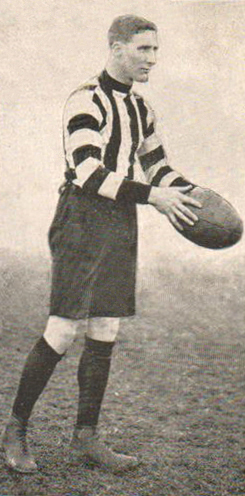

Personal information
- Full name: Walter Henry Lee
- Born: 19 March 1889; Collingwood, Victoria
- Died: 11 September 1968 (aged 79); Northcote, Victoria
- Original team: Rose of Northcote
- Debut: Round 7, 1906, Collingwood vs. Melbourne, at Victoria Park
- Height: 175 cm (5 ft 9 in)
- Weight: 76 kg (168 lb)

Playing career^{1}
Years	Club	Games (Goals)
1906–1922	Collingwood	230 (707)
- ^{1} Playing statistics correct to the end of 1922.

Career highlights
- 11× Collingwood leading goalkicker: 1906–10, 1914–17, 1919, 1921; 7× Leading goalkicker Medal: 1907–09, 1914, 1916–17, 1919; Collingwood Captain: 1920–21; Collingwood Premiership side: 1910, 1917, 1919; Collingwood team of the Century; Victorian representative: 19 games, 60 goals

Walter Henry "Dick" Lee (19 March 1889 – 11 September 1968) was an Australian rules footballer who played for the Collingwood Football Club in the (then) Victorian Football League (VFL).

== Family ==
The son of long-term Collingwood trainer Walter Henry Lee (1863–1952), and Isabella Lee (1867–1929), née Turnbull, Walter Henry Lee was born in Collingwood on 19 March 1889.

He married Zella Dixon (1888-1972) in 1927.

== Football ==
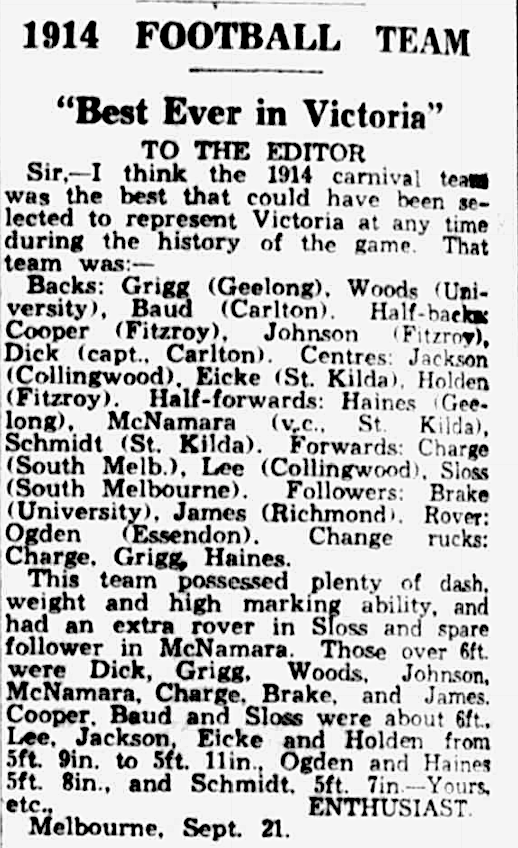
Enthusiast's Letter to the Editor The Herald, 21 September 1934.

Lee was one of the first great forwards in Australian Football with an ability to win the ball on the ground or in the air. He was considered one of the finest practitioners of the place kick in the game, a reputation which followed long after the skill disappeared from the game.

In 1912, Lee had a cartilage removed from his knee; and, according to his (then) team captain, Dan Minogue, writing in 1937, Lee was the first senior VFL footballer to have that operation.

His last kick in his last match for Collingwood scored Collingwood's final goal in its 11-point loss to Fitzroy in the 1922 VFL Grand Final.

== Death ==
He died at Northcote, Victoria, on 11 September 1968.

== Honours ==
=== Life Member ===
He was made a life member of the Collingwood Football Club in 1918.

=== Australian Football Hall of Fame ===
In 1996, Lee was inducted into the Australian Football Hall of Fame.

=== Team of the Century ===
In 1998, he was selected on the half-forward flank in the Collingwood team of the Century.

== See also ==
- 1908 Melbourne Carnival
- 1911 Adelaide Carnival
- 1914 Sydney Carnival
- 1921 Perth Carnival
