= History of the Collingwood Football Club =

The Collingwood Football Club is an Australian rules football club playing in the Australian Football League ('AFL').

Like many Victorian AFL clubs, Collingwood has a history extending back over 130 years. It initially represented the inner Melbourne suburb of Collingwood, Victoria; however, its supporter base, while rooted in the city of Melbourne, extends throughout Australia. It has won 16 VFL/AFL premierships, being tied with Essendon and Carlton for the most number of premierships. The Club holds the record for most premierships in a row with 4 (1927–1930) and remains the only VFL club to have examined a full home and away season undefeated (1929).

This article explores the club's history from its formation over 130 years ago in 1892 to the current season.

== Early history ==
=== Formation ===
The Collingwood Football Club was born on the cusp of one of the world's worst depressions in February 1892. Collingwood played its first game in the Victorian Football Association ('VFA'), the premier football competition against Carlton Football Club on, 7 May 1892.

Collingwood initially had only scheduled 17 games but needed more than 18 games to join the Victorian Football Association. The Club looked to be missing out on being a part of the 1892 season until the Carlton Football Club added a game to its list of matches so that Collingwood would have the required 18 games. Carlton even donated the gate takings from the game to the fledgling club.

Sporting a black and white striped guernsey reminiscent of the magpie, the Club became known colloquially as the 'Magpies' - or the 'Pies' for short.

=== 1896 premiership and entry to VFL ===
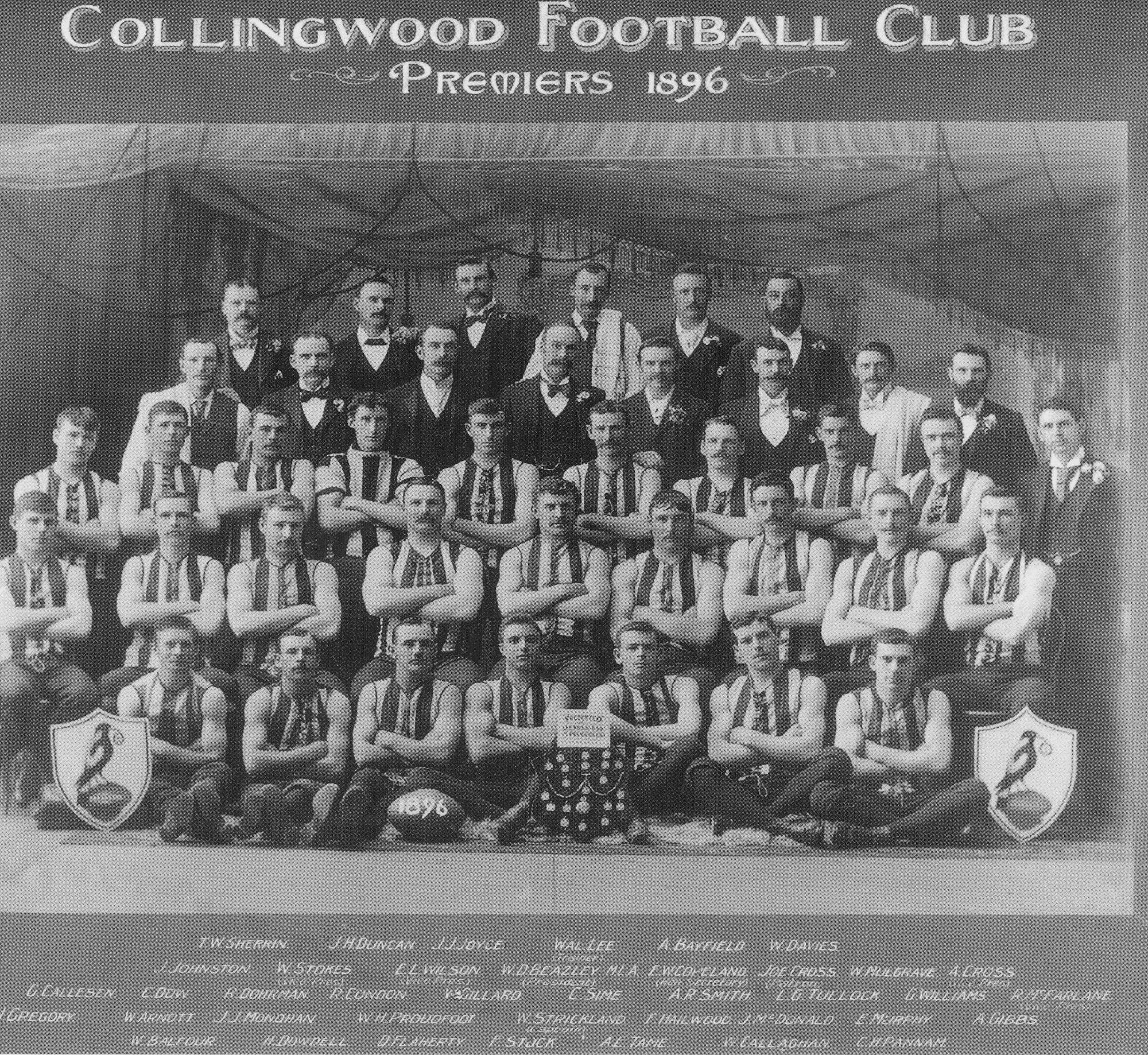
The Collingwood team that won the VFA premiership in 1896.

Being the VFA's newest team, Collingwood improved quickly and won its first and only VFA premiership in 1896.

At the end of the 1896 season, Collingwood and South Melbourne finished equal at the top of the ladder with records of 14–3–1, causing a playoff match to determine the premiership; this was the first time this had occurred in VFA history. The VFA delayed the playing of the final match between the two top teams for a week to avoid adversely affecting the attendance of the other final-round matches. The game was played on 3 October 1896 at the East Melbourne Cricket Ground. Collingwood won the match six goals to five, in front of an estimated crowd of 12,000.

Even though this victory brought Collingwood a premiership, it was not promoted as a "Grand Final" but as a Match for the Premiership.

In 1897, Collingwood and fellow VFA clubs Fitzroy, Melbourne, St Kilda, Carlton, Essendon, South Melbourne, and Geelong split from the VFA and formed the VFL (Victorian Football League).

=== Early 20th century ===
In the decade of 1900–1909, Collingwood scored 119 wins from 172 games, and two Grand Final victories from four attempts. The Pies built a reputation as a fearsome side. During this period, the club had eight skippers, with Lardie Tulloch, the longest-standing captain of the decade, spending three years at the helm. Collingwood also employed their first coach, Bill Strickland, in 1904. In 1906, Collingwood's first true icon emerged, Dick Lee. In his career at the club, he played 230 games and, after his retirement in 1922, had totalled 707 goals. The Magpies played off in the Grand Finals of 1901, 1902, 1903, and 1905–coming out on top in ’02 and ’03. In 1902, Collingwood defeated Essendon by 33 points in front of a crowd of 35,202 at the Melbourne Cricket Ground ('MCG').

The following year Collingwood won to complete back-to-back wins against rival Fitzroy by only two points. For the rest of the decade, Collingwood could only manage one more Grand Final, against Fitzroy again, at the MCG. This time, however, Fitzroy atoned for their loss two years prior with a 13-point victory.

Collingwood only played in four finals in the next four seasons, winning none of them. The Club finished the decade with seven finals losses in a row. During this decade, Dick Condon, credited with the invention of the stab kick, was considered one of the Club's most talented players. Club legend Jock McHale labelled Condon the greatest footballer he had seen at Collingwood.

=== 1920s-1940s: McHale era ===
Collingwood became a powerhouse club during the 1920s and 1930s. This era included a run of four premierships in a row from 1927 to 1930, the only VFL/AFL undefeated season (1929), and the longest-serving coach in the history of the VFL/AFL, Jock McHale. McHale coached Collingwood for 37 years from 1912 to 1949 after playing for the Magpies from 1902 to 1921.

The record of four premierships in succession has never been matched. Melbourne won in 1955–1957 and the Brisbane Lions in 2001–2003, reaching the following season's Grand Final only to be thwarted by Collingwood and Port Adelaide, respectively. This period produced six premierships, and some of the club's greatest players.

Syd Coventry, brother Gordon Coventry, Harry Collier and Albert Collier were among the preeminent players of their time, helping establish the Magpies as a club based upon strong family connections. Gordon Coventry led the goal-kicking every season between 1922 and 1927, while brother Syd captained the club for eight seasons. Syd's record of 153 matches as skipper was overtaken by Nathan Buckley in late 2006. Albert Collier won the Brownlow Medal in 1929, and brother Harry won it the following year. The Collingwood team of the late 1920s has been described as one of the greatest football 'dynasties' along with Melbourne of the 1950s, Hawthorn of the 1980s and, some suggest, Brisbane of the early 2000s (decade).

=== Post McHale ===
Jock McHale retired from coaching at the end of 1949 and Phonse Kyne, former ruckman, coached for the next 14 years. After losing the 1952 Grand Final to Geelong, Collingwood finally achieved premiership success in 1953 with a two-goal victory over reigning premier Geelong, led by Lou Richards. This premiership team comprised three sets of brothers–Ron & Lou Richards, Bob & William Rose, and Bill, Pat & Mick Twomey. Coincidentally, it was the first and last time Collingwood legend Bob Rose was to experience premiership success as a player or coach.

The Club's 1958 premiership was to be its last for 32 years. The victory in 1958 was an underdog victory, with Collingwood motivated to prevent its opponent Melbourne winning a fourth successive Grand Final.

=== 1959–1989: the Colliwobbles ===
In 1959 Melbourne won again, and after Collingwood's poor performance against Melbourne in the 1960 Grand Final, the Colliwobbles were born. Bob Rose took over as coach in 1962 and he was unlucky to coach three losing Grand Final sides, by 4, 1 and 10 points in 1964, 1966 and 1970.

The 1960s and 1970s produced some of Collingwood's greatest ever players, including Len Thompson, Des Tuddenham, Peter McKenna, Wayne Richardson, Barry Price, Ross Dunne, Phil Carman, John Greening, Billy Picken, Ron Wearmouth, Peter Moore and Max Richardson. Yet none of them achieved a Premiership win.

The 1976 season saw the Club win its first-ever wooden spoon, which subsequently led to the dismissal of senior coach Murray Weideman. This was partly because Weideman refused to work at the club while Ern Clarke was president, leading to a turbulent season for the Magpies. But then Collingwood broke with long-held tradition the following year when the Club appointed a non-Collingwood member as coach for the first time in its history–high-profiled former Richmond Premiership coach Tom Hafey. Hafey lifted the Magpies from a last position the previous year to the Grand Final. The Hafey-led Magpies played in grand finals in 1977 (drew, then lost in a replay the following week to North Melbourne), 1979, 1980, 1981, inspiring the term "Colliwobbles" to signify a choking phenomenon.

Hafey was sensationally sacked during the 1982 season after guiding the club to five Grand Finals. Mick Erwin replaced him, then John Cahill and Bob Rose between 1982 and 1986. Leigh Matthews took over after Bob Rose stepped aside and developed a team leading to the drought-breaking premiership of 1990. Ironically, he would later coach against the Magpies in two more Grand Finals.

== 1990s ==
The 1990s saw Collingwood win its first premiership after a long break, only to fall from success to earn its second-ever wooden spoon by 1999.

=== 1990–1995 ===
The 1990 Premiership, coached by Leigh Matthews and skippered by Tony Shaw, provided relief via a one-sided affair against Essendon in which the Magpies recorded a 48-point victory. The win ended a 32-year premiership drought that included eight Grand Final losses and one draw.

Unfortunately, however, the Club lapsed into a state of decline. Its status as a potential powerhouse at the beginning of the decade was reduced with each passing season, the Club contesting the finals only twice after 1990 (in 1992 and 1994, losses to St Kilda and West Coast, respectively).

The Club then ended Matthews’ ten-year term. Matthews himself said that after being rolled by the Board after chasing and almost signing Tony Lockett, he knew his time was up.

=== 1996–1998 ===
Opting to find a replacement from inside the Club, it selected Tony Shaw as the new coach. Under Shaw, the team appeared to start the season strongly before tapering off. The team comprised a blend of veterans at the end of their playing career, poor drafting and bungled trades.

In Shaw's first year as coach, 1996, the team was more attacking than it had been under Matthews, but injuries to skipper Gavin Brown and key players Graham Wright and Damian Monkhorst derailed the season. By mid-year the team nearly became the first Collingwood team to lose eight successive games. The losses were interrupted by a ten goal victory over North Melbourne in round 15, supported by high quality performances from Nathan Buckley and Saverio Rocca.

Following the recruitment of Anthony Rocca, Saverio Rocca's younger brother in 1997, the team reached the top of the league ladder after only eight rounds, losing only two matches. But after leading by 37 points at a quarter time over the previous year's runner-up, Sydney, the team lost.

The Magpies lost to Hawthorn at Waverley Park the following week, failing to score a goal in the opening term. The team did not win a match until round 15 at Victoria Park, against Fremantle. The Club celebrated a 100-point victory in Buckley's 100th outing, with Saverio Rocca scoring nine goals.

The season petered out; the team lacking the polish to crack it for September action, the Jekyll and Hyde nature of the side on show in the final two weeks, with a narrow defeat at the hands of Adelaide snuffing out any finals hopes before ending the year on a high note, a decisive win over perennial powerhouse North Melbourne. At least the club had something to work with in the future.

Sadly, 1998 proved much of the same for Shaw, but without the thrilling finish. Instead, another bright start paved the way for some heavy losses midseason, successive victories in rounds 15 and 16 over Geelong and Hawthorn in the wet, the club's final opportunity to belt out its favourite tune until round eight of 1999.

=== 1999: A low point ===
One loss followed another as the team plummeted to an all-new low, losing the final six matches of the year.

Victoria Park, Collingwood's home ground until 1999

The true bottoming out of the football club occurred after what was dubbed an insipid performance against the oldest and most hated rival, Carlton, in round 21 at the MCG. Scoring a dismal 8.15 for the match, it is remembered by many as the very day the Collingwood Football Club's nose dive from premiers in 1990 to easybeats was completed. Players struggled for direction as their opponents blew them out of the water.

But as they say, the darkest hour is before dawn, and so it proved for Collingwood. The match paved the way for Eddie McGuire, then a media personality with Channel 9 and Triple M, to open his doors to the idea of the presidency, a position he was elected to after the season concluded and one which he held until 2021, presiding over the reformation of the Collingwood Football Club. In one of the few bright moments of the year, Buckley finished second in the Brownlow Medal to Saint Robert Harvey on 24 votes, winning his third Copeland Trophy and relieving Brown of the captaincy.

Although the side may have finished 16th and collected only its second wooden spoon in season 1999, things were changing around Victoria Park, including the ground itself. It now hosted its final two home and away matches (losses to West Coast in round three and Brisbane in round 22) while seeing the end of Shaw as coach, Brown as captain and the introduction at the season's end of some likely lads in Josh Fraser, Rhyce Shaw and Ben Johnson, as well as current coach Mick Malthouse.

First, the club's 13-match losing streak (rounds 17, 1998 to 7, 1999) finished, Buckley returning from a broken jaw suffered in round two on Easter Monday's loss to Carlton to pilot the side to a well-celebrated win in the mud and slush of the MCG. Buckley's return to action was heralded with four goals of his own and three Brownlow Votes, and the team overcame fellow cellar dweller Fremantle. If it was not for his untimely jaw injury, suffered when his head collided with Blue wingman Justin Murphy's knee, Buckley may well have won his first Brownlow Medal, finishing equal third with Blues ruckman Matthew Allan on 20 votes, eight behind overall winner Shane Crawford.

The team, under the guidance of Shaw for the final time, produced some bright sparks in amongst the smouldering ashes of the 1990s. These sparks which morphed over time into phoenixes providing hope of a bright future in Chris Tarrant, Paul Licuria, Tarkyn Lockyer, Anthony Rocca, Nick Davis, Heath Scotland, Damien Adkins, and Rupert Betheras. The eight formed the nucleus along with incoming draftees who joined the club over the next three years as part of the 2001–2003 surge back up the ladder.

As the game farewelled Victoria Park as a league ground in the final match of the year, a damp squib of a match despite the off-field staff's best efforts, the day tarred by poor weather and a Brisbane side destined for greater things. It also signified the end of Shaw after four years and little success, and experienced stalwarts of the decade, Monkhorst, Alex McDonald, and Scott Crow, also waved into the sunset (or, in Monkhorst's case, Moorabbin at St Kilda).

== 2000s ==
The 2000s (decade) saw the club's rebuilding with a new president, coach, and a new list of players. Within two years, Collingwood had made it to a grand final, ultimately making two appearances in 2002 and 2003, defeated both times by Brisbane, who eventually won three in a row. The club's performance waned in the 2004–2005 seasons only to return to form, making the finals in the 2006 and 2007 seasons.

=== 2000 ===
The beginning of 2000 also signified a new beginning at Victoria Park for Collingwood. Mick Malthouse, premiership coach for West Coast and previously a footballer, was lured to the club by McGuire, Buckley re-signed to the tune of five years, and the club used its draft picks, snaring ruck protégé Josh Fraser with the first selection in the 1999 National Draft, wingman Rhyce Shaw, the son of former club captain Ray and nephew of Tony, Ben Johnson and Leon Davis. Three of the trio formed part of the club's leadership group in 2007, with Davis also noted for his growing confidence in a leadership capacity.

Under Malthouse, the club displayed glimpses of what was on offer in the coming years, with the young brigade leading the way to a 5–0 season in 2000, a turnaround previously unheard of from such no names. Buckley was everywhere in the opening half of the year, the Rocca brothers returned to their best form, and the kids, Adkins, Fraser, Johnson and Davis, enjoyed debuts to remember in the round one defeat of Hawthorn on a sweltering MCG under hot Melbourne skies.

It all came to a grinding halt in round six when reigning premiers brought the kids back to earth with a shudder, giving them an old-fashioned football lesson. The rot set in again, albeit somewhat more accepted by the Collingwood faithful than it would previously have been, for they knew Malthouse's plan and how pain would be endured before they were rewarded with the promised pleasure.

Minus a breezy win over eventual loungers, St Kilda. There was little like about the Magpies until the closing stages of the season when Nick Davis led the side to a rousing victory over the Kangaroos at Colonial Stadium. In the final round of the season, the club bid farewell two of its finest products, Gavin Brown and Gavin Crosisca, against a premiership-bound Essendon at the MCG in round 22.

Brown and Crosisca were at the forefront of the club's quasi-glory days of the late 1980s and early 1990s and were bastions of hope in the dark days of the latter decade. They received a stunning goodbye from the crowd and a sentimental and terrifically sporting gesture from Essendon and their coach, Kevin Sheedy, who stood nearby and clapped the two Gavins from the ground for one last time on their teammates' shoulders. Brown would remain to this very day at the club as an assistant coach, while Crosisca traveled the state in the same guise, albeit with stints at Hawthorn, North Ballarat, the Kangaroos and now Carlton.

With the departure of Brown and Crosisca, not a player remained on the list from the 1990 premiership side. The era of days gone by had gone, but it would not be forgotten. However the new blood was coming through, thick and fast. September action was just around the corner.

=== 2001 ===
The season of 2001 marked a whole new beginning for the Collingwood Football Club. Whilst, yes, it had new personal in 2000; the club used much of the year to clean out deadwood which was stagnating at the club. As Brown and Crosisca departed, so did Brad Smith, Ricky Olarenshaw, Shane Watson and several others. But the biggest shocks came in the trading form of Paul Williams and the delisting of Saverio Rocca. Although the pair had not seen their best format for a year or two, it still came as a surprise to many at the speed the Magpies gave them away. The club, though, received nothing for Rocca's services, which was quite absurd, considering the fact that the Kangaroos could draft him with the 34th selection in the 2000 National Draft.

To add to the new fresh air passing through the club, the team now donned a new look jumper. For over 100 years, the Magpies had worn a jumper with black stripes on a white background. Now, it was reversed; the players wore a black back on their jumper with a white number, and the colours of each stripe were changed. The year began brightly, with some promising showings in the Ansett Cup morphing into some heartening displays in the entire season, with the youth, as Shane O’Bree, Paul Licuria and Tarkyn Lockyer collecting much of the slack from Buckley in the midfield.

The club's busy trading in the off season of 2000/2001 also paid dividends, with James Clement, Jarrod Molloy, Shane Wakelin Brodie Holland, Carl Steinfort and Chad Rintoul all having the desired impact, using their matured bodies and willingness to make the best of a second chance (or in the cases of Molloy and Rintoul, their third) at league level. Molloy's barracking work, in particular, won him accolades from all comers, finishing runner-up to Licuria in the Copeland Trophy.

Even more important to the club's future was the youth drafted throughout the past two seasons. Alan Didak and Ryan Lonie immediately added spark to the team, while Jason Cloke and Guy Richards were cultivated with Williamstown in the VFL. Lonie's meteoric rise, in particular, stole the hearts of Collingwood fans around the nation with his daring runs, flashy bouncing, and long-range bombs from outside the fifty winning plaudits from many up the pecking order in the AFL, nominated for the Ansett Rising Star for his troubles following another night out at the MCG against Richmond in round four.

That match also marked the one, and only, match for highly rated recruit Danny Roach. Selected with the seventh choice in the 1999 National Draft, Roach's career was curtailed by nagging hip injuries which forced him to retire after only two years in the system.

Under Malthouse, the players began showing greater awareness and maturing and were now standing on their own when the temperature rose in the kitchen. After a narrow loss to Hawthorn because of inaccurate kicking, the Pies won their next two matches against Fremantle and the Western Bulldogs, with Buckley leading the way, winning a remarkable, career-high 46 disposals against the Dockers, piloting the way to victory before playing a significant role in the side's massive success over the Bulldogs on a sandy Colonial Stadium.

Some more close losses ensued against Richmond and Essendon on Anzac Day; the latter was a match that could easily have been won had the Magpies made the most of their opportunities. A strong, nail-biting triumph over Carlton the following week on Federation Weekend, gave the squad the impetus to mount a final challenge.

The team stumbled badly in round seven against their favourite bullies from the previous decade, the Kangaroos. With the match there for the taking late in the day, Mrs. Rocca did not know how to look. At one finish, eldest son Sav put his side in front with minutes remaining, while in the dying seconds, Anthony had the chance to win it for the Pies. He could not convert the side to rue the missed opportunity much later in the season. The irony that Sav, the man cut loose free by the club only months prior, was the man to win the match was too much to bear for many diehards. The match also marked the debut of 2006 Copeland Trophy winner Alan Didak.

Fortunately, the group could turn around their misfortune with a victory over Port Adelaide, one for the highlight reels. Despite playing in foreign territory in front of a hostile crowd, the Magpies bit complicated all night, with Josh Fraser's intercept of Brett Montgomery's handball late in the piece and ensuing goal wrapping up a morale boosting nine point triumph.

The club defeated St Kilda in unconvincing fashion on an overcast day a week later before succumbing to the flooding, negative ways of Rodney Eade and his Sydney Swans. The Swans were ultra defensive all day, flooding so much so if Colonial Stadium would be eroded away into the docklands and beyond!

Swamped by such negative tactics, the Magpies could never drag themselves out of the mire, the match memorable only for Paul Williams’ return to face his old side, Buckley's hamstring injury and Molloy's spectacular launch over Swan fullback Andrew Dunkley. Sadly, for Molloy, the mark was not paid because of an indiscretion by Rocca, robbing Molloy of one mark of 2001.

Two thumping victories over Melbourne and the lowly West Coast followed, with the club now well placed for improved things, only to be struck down by their famed slump not long after. With Buckley back in toe, he led the side to a gritty two point triumph over Adelaide at Football Park, winning 38 possessions in a virtuoso performance.

Times quickly changed, with Geelong, Brisbane and then Hawthorn all steamrolling the young, tiring Magpies, dragging them back into the pack. With September not far away, there was little room for error.

The team suffered a fright in their encounter with the winless Dockers in round 17 at Subiaco Oval, before a loss to the Tigers under lights, a night which saw the side score only six goals (three to Nick Davis), all but put the kibosh on the team's finals aspirations.

A thrashing of the Western Bulldogs, led by Buckley, Fraser and four Leon Davis goals, kept their heads above water for the time being before Essendon shoved under them under lights. Despite the loss, the team recounted themselves, Rocca leading the way with six goals before the Bombers crept away late. The Pies' victory push was stalled when Molloy looked to clean up Bomber wingman Mark Mercuri but decapitated teammate Tarkyn Lockyer, concussion sidelining the likeable West Australian for the remaining two matches.

Carlton decided the hand the club a walloping in round 21, before the team, minus Lonie for the first time that season, a remarkable effort for a debutant, cruised to victory over the Kangaroos at Manuka Oval, Canberra, a win trumpeted as the changing of the guard by many, with the Roos on the slide, and the Magpies on the rise. It proved the final match for Brent Tuckey and Andrew Ukovic, while Heath Scotland saved his career with a 21 possession afternoon.

And so the season was done with Collingwood finishing 9th and narrowly missing out on final action for the first time since 1994. It was their highest finish since their most recent September showing. Thankfully, it would not be long before they again featured in the game's showpiece.

=== 2002 ===
In 2002, Collingwood rose from its seven-year hiatus from September action, reaching the finals for the first time since it bowed out by two points at the hands of West Coast in 1994 and the Grand Final for the first time since 1990. The club won 13 matches in the home and away rounds, although its late-season trough, which saw it win only one of its last four matches, saw most pundits write off the team's prospects in the month that matters. Despite this, the fourth-placed Magpies shook the competition to its foundations with a boilover victory against the top of the table Port Adelaide at AAMI Stadium in the Qualifying Final. Victory here bought the team a week's rest and booked a ticket with Adelaide in the preliminary final at the MCG. They won in emphatic fashion highlighted by a six-goal third term, Anthony Rocca's 75m pearler the stand out, while Betheras and Freeborn's majors were rewarded with roars louder than any other witnessed by the famous stadium. The win took them to the Grand Final, where the young Magpies acquitted themselves brilliantly, only to lose by nine points to the powerful Brisbane.

=== 2003 ===
The 2003 season was redemption, and began well, with three wins from the first three encounters, as well as an appearance in the Wizard Cup Grand Final, only to lose to Adelaide. With the club the talk of the town, the Pies bubble burst and reached the halfway mark of the season with six wins and six losses. A playing list that resilient rarely stays down for too long, and so it proved, with Nathan Buckley playing some career best football, igniting the side en route to finishing second on the ladder, winning 10 of its last 11 matches. A gritty win over bogy side Brisbane in the Qualifying Final was followed a fortnight later by a breezy 44 point triumph over Port Adelaide, securing the club's appearance in a grand final for the second year running, again to be played against Brisbane.

Here, however, is where things changed, the club first relishing its VFL affiliate Williamstown's Grand Final victory on the Sunday in a fitting send-off to retiring warriors Mark Richardson, Jarrod Molloy and Glenn Freeborn. On the Monday night, Buckley was crowned the Brownlow Medallist, in a three-way tie with Mark Ricciuto and Adam Goodes after years of near misses. The rot set in when key forward, and the club's most important player, Anthony Rocca, was suspended for two weeks for striking Port Adelaide's Brendon Lade in the preliminary final. For the second year in succession, the Pies were to be robbed of a vital cog in its well-oiled engine.

Although going into the Grand Final as favourites, Collingwood was beaten by a Brisbane side, written off by many as too old and slow. The Lions peppered the goals in the opening term, before taking advantage of the shellshocked Magpies with a six-goal to one second term. Only late plastic surgery to the scoreboard could save Collingwood any face, the Lions victorious for the third year on the trot by a whopping 50 points. The club was subjected to a summer-long period of ridicule, the ramifications of the loss stirring the mindset of the team for the next two years.

=== 2004–2006 ===
In 2004 and 2005, Collingwood finished 13th and 15th respectively, and by the end of the latter season, it appeared the team moulded since 2000 was broken. Despite the predictions of the game's experts, Malthouse regenerated the side through the recruitment of several likely young products, including Dale Thomas and Scott Pendlebury, while Travis Cloke had arrived a year earlier.

Collingwood made a blistering start to its 2006 campaign before a sudden loss of form following a torrid evening against Brisbane in round 10 derailed the season. Despite this, three late season victories took the side to fifth rung on the ladder, only to be unceremoniously swiped from the finals series by a Footscray outfit obsessed with outrunning their opposition. The loss left many questioning whether the era was over, but the coming season was to prove Collingwood would remain a successful side.

=== 2007 ===
Malthouse coached brilliantly throughout 2007, blooding 10 debutants while champions Buckley, James Clement and Paul Licuria were sidelined through injury. Such was the side's ability to tough out any onfield situation it faced. They achieved the rare success of never losing more than one match at a time. Despite finishing outside of the top four, the Magpies made it through to the Grand Final qualifier following stirring victories over the past two champions in Sydney and West Coast, but went down to Geelong by five points before a crowd of 98,002 attracting a higher attendance than the actual Grand Final, in a game that was ultimately referred to as the 'real' 2007 Grand Final.

Skipper Buckley retired in the ensuing weeks, as did Clement and Licuria, a changing of the guard apparent, as the young Magpies, such as Dale Thomas, Scott Pendlebury, Martin Clarke and Nick Maxwell proved themselves capable of not only keeping the club near the top end of the ladder, but perhaps within reach of premiership success in the years to come.

=== 2008 ===
Collingwood began 2008 in up-and-down fashion, winning three and losing three of their first six matches. The eventual premiers of Hawthorn smashed them by 65 points in round 7 before bouncing back to defeat the highly fancied St Kilda in round 8. They then produced a stunning 86-point demolition of reigning premiers Geelong in round 9, which turned out to be the Cats' only defeat of the home-and-away season. They looked set to challenge for the top 4, but poor form struck and they lost three consecutive matches from rounds 16–18 to fall off the pace. However, they recovered to win their next three games before losing to Fremantle in the final round to finish in 8th place. As a result, they played 5th-placed Adelaide in the 1st Elimination Final, and despite trailing by 24 points in the second quarter, ran over the top to win by 31. They were then soundly defeated by St Kilda in the semi-final to bring an end to their season.

=== 2009 ===
Collingwood was expected to challenge for the top 4 in 2009 but started poorly and sat at a 3–5 win–lose record after eight games. However, they recovered to win their next seven games before being easily beaten by reigning premiers on Hawthorn in round 16. They would win their next five before losing to the Western Bulldogs in round 22 by 24 points, just enough to push them down to 4th spot on percentage of the Bulldogs. The Magpies started well in their Qualifying Final against minor premier St Kilda, but were overrun by 28 points, and then faced a red-hot Adelaide at the MCG in the semi-final. Despite trailing by 32 points late in the second quarter, they surged home to win by 5 points after Jack Anthony kicked a goal from a free kick with just 20 seconds remaining. However, they were no match for Geelong in the preliminary final, going down by 73 points to finish the year.

=== 2010 ===
Over the off season, Collingwood recruited Sydney ruckman Darren Jolly and former St Kilda captain Luke Ball. Although Collingwood has always been renowned for their tackling pressure, they amped this up throughout 2010 and developed a strategy around pressure from their small forwards, winning centre clearances and their half back line pushing up extremely high to lock the ball in their forward 50. Hence they finished the season number 1 in both tackles and inside 50s. This was the strategy which would then become the springboard for a successful two-year period in which they lost only 7 games and made the Grand Final both seasons.

Collingwood performed scratchily in the NAB Cup and were made to play NAB Cup premiers and premiership favourites of the Western Bulldogs in round 1. Despite coming in as underdogs, they beat the Bulldogs, boasting recruit Barry Hall, by six goals in a stirring victory. They would then win in an unconvincing fashion against reigning wooden loungers Melbourne by a single point and would then lose by 28 points against top four aspirant St Kilda in a low-scoring encounter in round 3. Despite the Magpies dominating field position for much of the game they only kicked 4 goals and 17 behinds in what would become the beginning of a trend of inaccurate goal-kicking which the Pies would be widely criticised for throughout the season. Much of this was attributed to Collingwood's strategy of moving the ball around the boundary, leading to many shots from difficult angles. This game plan was unique to Collingwood's coach, Michael Malthouse.

They then responded by scoring a 64-point thumping of a Hawthorn side expected to bounce back from a disappointing 2009 campaign, with the loss being the beginning of a form slump for the Hawks. Despite the victory, Collingwood was still noted for kicking 17 goals to 21 behinds in their third successive performance in which they kicked more behinds than goals. Collingwood dominated Essendon in the next Anzac Day clash the following round, winning by 65 points in front of 90,070 people. They would back up this performance by beating Carlton in an entertaining 53 point win in round 6 in front of 80,645 fans. The combined score of 257 points in the game made the game highly entertaining, with commentators contesting the game to the Friday night game between St Kilda and the Western Bulldogs earlier in the week, in which 95 points were scored. This game was considered highly boring by spectators. The round 7 clash against North Melbourne was a convincing 11 goal victory propelling them into premiership favouritism as they had won their last four games by an average of 10 goals. They backed this up with an entertaining six goal win in Perth against Fremantle in what would become the start of a highly successful period interstate.

Despite being overwhelming favourites going into the round 9 clash against Geelong, they lost by six goals in front of 88,115 fans. They kicked 6 goals and 14 behinds in the match. They then lost to the Brisbane Lions at the Gabba in the following week by 8 points, again criticised for their inaccurate kicking, kicking 11 goals and 14 behinds throughout the match. They responded against the Bulldogs in the following week in round 11, winning by 10 points, with a late surge by the Bulldogs making the score not reflect Collingwood's dominance.

The next match was not one to remember, with Collingwood kicking 9 goals and 22 behinds against a lowly Melbourne to finish the match in a draw, with most experts writing them off and declaring Geelong the premiership favourites. This was their second unconvincing performance against Melbourne for the year. This would be the start of a turnaround for Collingwood with them recording a 25-point victory against Sydney in the following week as part of a successful run against the Sydney Swans, with a winning streak going back to 2005.

They backed this up with an 83-point victory against eventual wooden loungers West Coast in round 14 in front of 38,781 fans at Etihad Stadium. Their next win was a 26-point victory against Port Adelaide in Adelaide in Mark Williams' last game as coach of the Power. The fired up power scored 5 goals to none in the first quarter before Collingwood recorded a 58-point turnaround after quarter time. The next performance against St Kilda in round 16 was their most convincing for the season with them recording a 48-point victory in front of 81,386 fans at the MCG with this victory propelling Collingwood to the top of the ladder, a position they would keep for the rest of the year. This was also the start of a controversial 7 game streak for Collingwood at the MCG to finish the home and away season. Their next victory was a convincing 82 point thumping of a lowly Richmond, followed by a 48-point victory over the top eight sides and bitter rival Carlton in front of 76,980 fans. The subsequent game against Geelong in round 19 was widely expected as it was universally regarded as the match between the competitions two best teams with the top spot up for grabs. Despite Geelong performing well for parts of the match, Collingwood was too good and won by 22 points in front of a massive crowd of 84,401. This win propelled Collingwood to premiership favouritism, which they would keep for the rest of the year. They reinforced their status as the competitions premier team with a 98-point drubbing of Essendon in the following round 20. Their next match against Adelaide was an unconvincing 3 point victory, with Collingwood's inaccurate kicking again notable for their score of 6 goals and 18 behinds almost costing them the match. They finished the season with a 3-point loss to fellow top eight side Hawthorn with their score of 13 goals and 17 behinds again highlighting their inaccurate kicking. They finished the home-and-away season on top of the ladder with a percentage of over 140 and, despite the loss in round 22, were considered the premiership favourites.

The finals series began well with Collingwood recording a convincing 62 point win against a disappointing Bulldogs side.

The All-Australian squad would be named before the preliminary final with 4 magpies being awarded spots in the final 22: Harry O'Brien across half-back, Alan Didak at the half-forward flank, Dane Swan in the centre and Scott Pendlebury on the bench.

The preliminary final was one of the most memorable wins in Collingwood history with them kicking 7 goals in the first quarter and leading by 62 points at half time against a highly talented Geelong side in front of 95,241 fanatical fans, securing a spot in the 2010 Grand Final.

Brownlow night was on the next Monday with Dane Swan being the highest polling Magpie, finishing with 24 votes to come third behind winner Chris Judd and Geelong's Gary Ablett. Future captain Scott Pendlebury also performed well finishing equal forth with Geelong young star Joel Selwood with 21 votes.

Collingwood were heavy favourites going into the grand final and, despite leading for much of the match, couldn't withstand a saint's fightback and drew the game at 68 point apiece. With a final score of 9 goals and 14 behinds, Collingwood was against criticised for their goal kicking inaccuracy. Despite the performance, they were still favourites to win the replay, and they did by 56 points making this the biggest Grand Final margin in a Grand Final won by Collingwood.

=== 2011 ===
Collingwood secured former champion Chris Tarrant from Fremantle and former Richmond small forward Andrew Krakauer (who had recently been released from a sentence in gaol)

Collingwood began its premiership defence by winning the NAB Cup over Essendon. Collingwood was universally considered the premiership favourites going into the season.

Collingwood didn't disappoint its fans, recording a massive 75 point victory over Port Adelaide in round 1 without skipper Nick Maxwell. They then smashed North Melbourne at Etihad by 87 points, again without Maxwell, with Cloke kicking 5 goals and Pendlebury and Swan having 79 possessions between them. After the amazing opening to the season, some predicted that Collingwood would examine the season undefeated, and they were the odd-on favourites. In their first match at the MCG and first real rest against fellow undefeated side, Carlton in round three Collingwood cruised to win by 28 points in front of 88,181 fans, with this the largest home-and-away attendance between the two clubs in history. They continued their good form in round 4 thumping Richmond by 71 points, with Dane Swan the clear star with 33 disposals and 4 goals. Collingwood's score of 161 was their highest ever against Richmond.

Collingwood won against Essendon at Anzac day in round 5, recording a five-goal win. Despite this, the match didn't reflect Essendon's performance and was seen by many as a classic Anzac Day Game. Scott Pendlebury won the Anzac Medal for the second consecutive year with 34 disposals and 3 goals. In round 6 against the Western Bulldogs, the game was tight for most of the contest, with Collingwood kicking a remarkable 8 goals in 18 minutes in the final quarter to win by 48 points.

Collingwood would have their first buy in round 7 and would then go to face an also undefeated Geelong team in round 8. Despite Collingwood again playing without skipper Nick Maxwell, they were still the overwhelming favourites. Despite this, they lost by 3 points in controversial circumstances, with Scott Pendlebury taking advantage after a Cameron Wood free kick and kicking a goal to put Collingwood in front. The umpire deemed that the advantage was not there and called the ball back, meaning the goal didn't count. This was made more controversial because the umpiring department was very hasty in defending the decision without apparent review, which was compounded because the AFL disagreed and announced the decision to be a mistake. Hence, many experts accused the umpiring department of being too defensive of wrong decisions. Despite this, Geelong won the inside 50s by 20 and probably were the better team on the day. Collingwood started slowly against Adelaide the following week, trailing at three-quarter times before kicking 11 goals in a row to win the game by 43 points in a 55-point turnaround after three-quarter times.

Collingwood then faced West Coast at the MCG comfortably winning the game by 52 points, with Dale Thomas getting 30 disposals and 2 goals, including contenders for mark and goal of the year. Collingwood then faced St Kilda in the grand final replay, with the game going much the same as the replay last year with a 57-point victory to the Pies. After this match the Collingwood Football Club raised concerns over the fitness of out-of-form Dane Swan alongside teammates Darren Jolly, Brent Macaffer and Nathan Brown (all injured) and sent them to a high altitude training camp in Arizona so that the four could recover from their individual injuries. Hence they missed the round 12 Queens Birthday clash against Melbourne with Dale Thomas also withdrawn. Despite this Collingwood would smash Melbourne by 88 points without many of their most important and reaffirmed their status as overwhelming premiership favourites.

=== 2012 ===
As per the succession plan that was signed in 2009, Nathan Buckley replaced Mick Malthouse as Collingwood coach in 2012. The Magpies started shakily, losing to Hawthorn in round 1 and being thrashed by Carlton in round 3, before winning 10 consecutive matches to sit on top of the table after round 14. From that point, they won 4 and lost 4 in an ordinary finish to the year, finishing in 4th spot. They were comprehensively beaten by Hawthorn in their Qualifying Final before overcoming a slow start to defeat the favoured West Coast Eagles by 13 points in the semi-final. However, they went down to eventual premiers Sydney by 26 points in the preliminary final at ANZ Stadium.

=== 2013 ===
Collingwood endured an up-and-down 2013, losing to lowly Gold Coast but also defeating reigning premiers Sydney and other formidable sides such as Essendon, Richmond and Geelong. They finished the season in 6th place, but were eliminated following a shock 24-point loss to Port Adelaide at the MCG in the Elimination Final.

=== 2014 ===
Collingwood started 2014 slowly, losing 2 of its first 3 games before winning 7 of its next 8. However, a shock loss to the Western Bulldogs followed by a loss to reigning premiers Hawthorn sees the club sitting in 6th place as of round 14. And Finished 11th. Collingwood missed the finals for the first time since 2005
