= Thorold Merrett =

Australian rules footballer (born 1933)

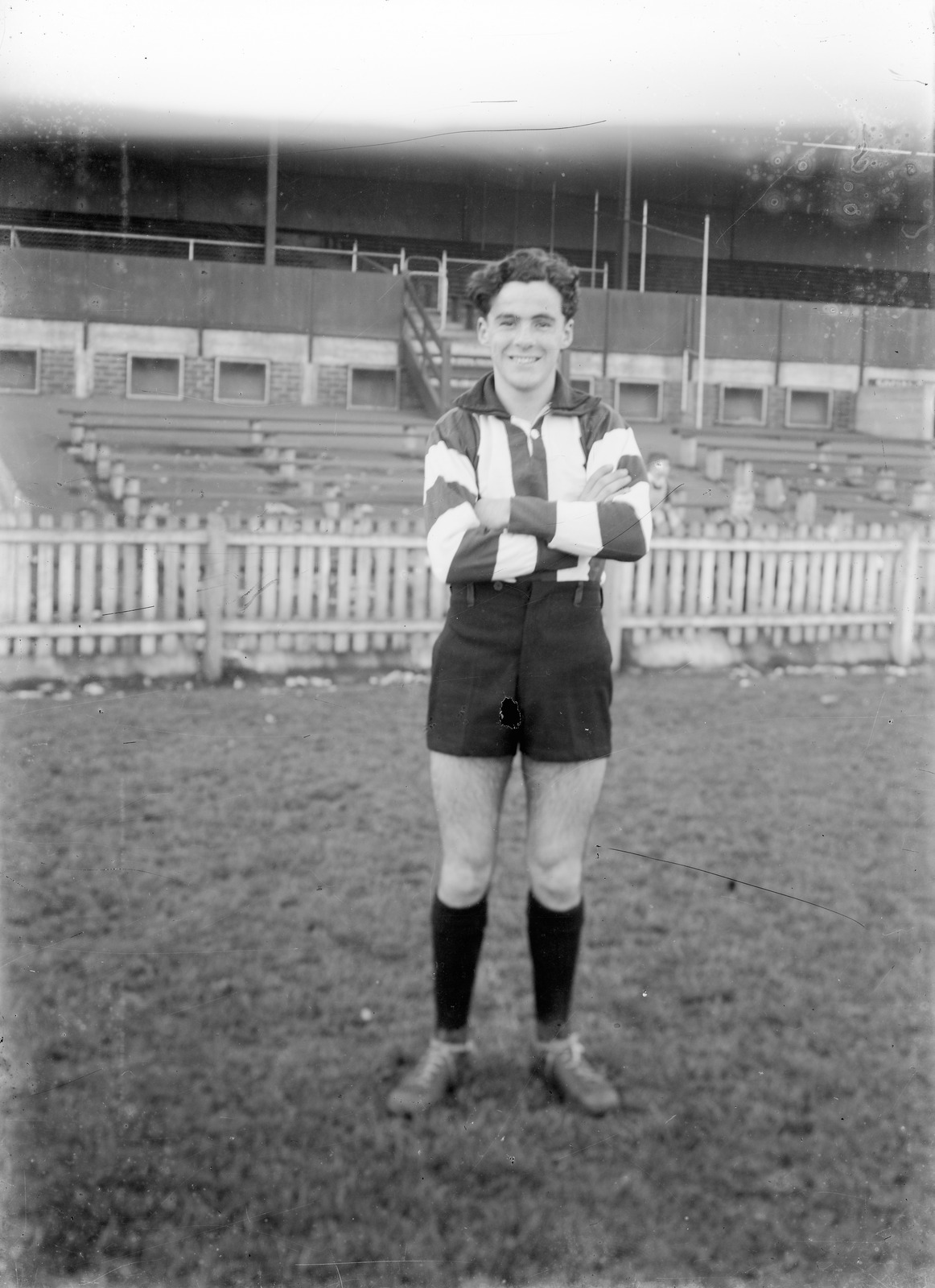

Personal information
- Full name: Thorold Lloyd Merrett
- Nickname: Titch
- Born: 30 September 1933 (age 93)
- Original team: Cobden (HFL)
- Height / weight: 168 cm / 62 kg
- Position: Wingman

Playing career^{1}
Years	Club	Games (Goals)
1950–1960	Collingwood	180 (148)
- ^{1} Playing statistics correct to the end of 1960.

Career highlights
- 2x Collingwood best and fairest 1958, 1959; Collingwood 3rd best and fairest 1952; Collingwood premiership side 1953, 1958; Collingwood Team of the Century (wing); Collingwood Hall of Fame

Thorold Lloyd Merrett (born 30 September 1933) is a former Australian rules footballer who played in the Victorian Football League (VFL) for Collingwood.

== Footballer ==
From the Victorian country town Cobden, Merrett, a keen Richmond fan, was a small footballer who wanted to play league football for the Tigers.

At 16 years of age, Merrett was rejected by Richmond legend Jack Dyer because of his light frame, but he was given another opportunity at Victoria Park, where he stood out in a set of practice games for Collingwood just before the 1950 season. It was initially thought by followers and players that he would be 'killed' because of his size (168 cm, 59 kg).

Merrett made his debut for Collingwood in 1950. At the age of 16, he was one of the youngest players in the VFL. Merrett played as a wingman and won respect for the accuracy and speed of his stab kick (which he had mastered on his farm as a kid by kicking stab passes through a suspended tyre). He became one of the best players in the competition, despite his unusually small stature for a league footballer. In 1952, Merrett came equal sixth in the Brownlow Medal, and won a top three finish in the Copeland Trophy. A year later he again finished in the top 10 in the Brownlow Medal and celebrated the 1953 premiership with the Magpies, when he was one of the best players in the Grand Final.

In years that followed, Merrett performed consistently and he continued to be regarded as one of the best kicks in the league, as well as one of the best wingmen. He played in two losing Grand Finals in 1955 and 1956 (he had also played in the 1952 losing side). In 1958, Merrett changed roles to become a Rover, and it succeeded. He won the club best and fairest and the Magpies also won the 1958 flag, in addition to being named best on ground. In 1959, he again starred as a rover, winning a second consecutive Copeland Trophy, and finished in the top 10 in the Brownlow Medal for a third time (Merrett ended up with 77 career Brownlow votes).

== Retirement ==
A second broken leg in 1960 saw Merrett miss most of the season and, due to doubts about the strength of his leg (the bone had not knitted perfectly), aged 26, he retired, feeling his best football was past. He played 180 games in 11 seasons and kicked 148 goals. He was also a dual best and fairest winner and premiership player, and Victorian representative on seven occasions.

He was a regular panelist on the ABC's Football Round-up, where he and other panellists discussed the Saturday round of VFL football.

In 1997, he was included in the Collingwood Football Club Hall of Fame and Team of the Century, on the wing.

== Business ==
Merrett formed a partnership with former Australian cricket captain Lindsay Hassett. The Merrett-Hassett sports stores had branches throughout Victoria. With the death of Hassett, Merrett went on to expand the stores. He later worked for Rebel Sport, a sporting goods store that later listed on the Australian Stock Exchange. In 2011, the business was taken over by the Super Retail Group.

== Family ==
Former Essendon Captain Zach Merrett and his brother, former Essendon player Jackson are Thorold's great nephews.
