= Mark Richardson (footballer) =

Australian rules footballer

Personal information
- Full name: Mark Richardson
- Nicknames: Bozo, Cho
- Born: 31 October 1972 (age 54)
- Original team: Macleod
- Height: 196 cm (6 ft 5 in)
- Weight: 99 kg (218 lb)
- Position: Forward/Defence

Playing career^{1}
Years	Club	Games (Goals)
1991–2002	Collingwood	141 (83)
- ^{1} Playing statistics correct to the end of 2002.

Mark Richardson (born 31 October 1972) is a former Australian rules footballer who played with Collingwood in the Australian Football League (AFL).

Recruited from Macleod, Richardson came from a strong footballing family. His father Wayne and uncle Max were both Collingwood players while Mark's grandfather Arnold was a West Australian interstate representative.

Richardson played for Collingwood at under-age level before breaking into the senior's list. Used initially as a key forward, he managed 23 goals in his debut year, three on them on debut against the Brisbane Bears. He also kicked seven goals in a match against Sydney mid season and six more the week after.

Injuries and inconsistent form restricted his appearances during the early part of his career but he was a regular fixture in the Collingwood team from 1995 to 2001. He played either up forward or in defence but also spent some time as a ruckman. Richardson's last match for Collingwood came in the final home and away match of the 2002 season. Although the club made the finals and ultimately the Grand Final, Richardson remained on the sidelines. He was originally selected as an emergency for the premiership decider but was forced to withdraw due to a thigh injury.
