= Barry Price =

Australian rules footballer

Personal information
- Born: 8 March 1949 (age 77)
- Original team: Ararat (Wimmera FL)
- Height: 175 cm (5 ft 9 in)
- Weight: 73 kg (161 lb)
- Position: Midfield

Playing career^{1}
Years	Club	Games (Goals)
1966–1975	Collingwood	157 (59)
1976–1978	Claremont	49 (48)
1979	Collingwood	1 (0)
Total		207 (107)
- ^{1} Playing statistics correct to the end of 1979.

Career highlights
- Collingwood best and fairest 1969; Collingwood vice-captain 1972; Collingwood best clubman 1973

Barry Price (born 8 March 1949) is a former Australian rules footballer who played 158 games and scored 60 goals with Collingwood Football Club in the Victorian Football League (VFL) between 1966 and 1977.

Price debuted in 1966 aged 17. Though only 177 cm tall, Price was courageous and just as productive with his hands as his feet. His evasive skills were excellent and he thrived on Bob Rose's intense training regimes, always presenting super fit. He won the Copeland Trophy, awarded to Collingwood's best and fairest player, in 1969. In 1970, he represented Victoria in interstate football.

In 1976, Price moved to play with Claremont in the West Australian National Football League (WANFL). He played for three years with Clarement before returning to Collingwood for a solitary game in 1979.

He was the coach of Prahran Football Club in the Victorian Football Association (VFA) in 1983.
