= Charlie Utting =

Australian rules footballer, born 1923

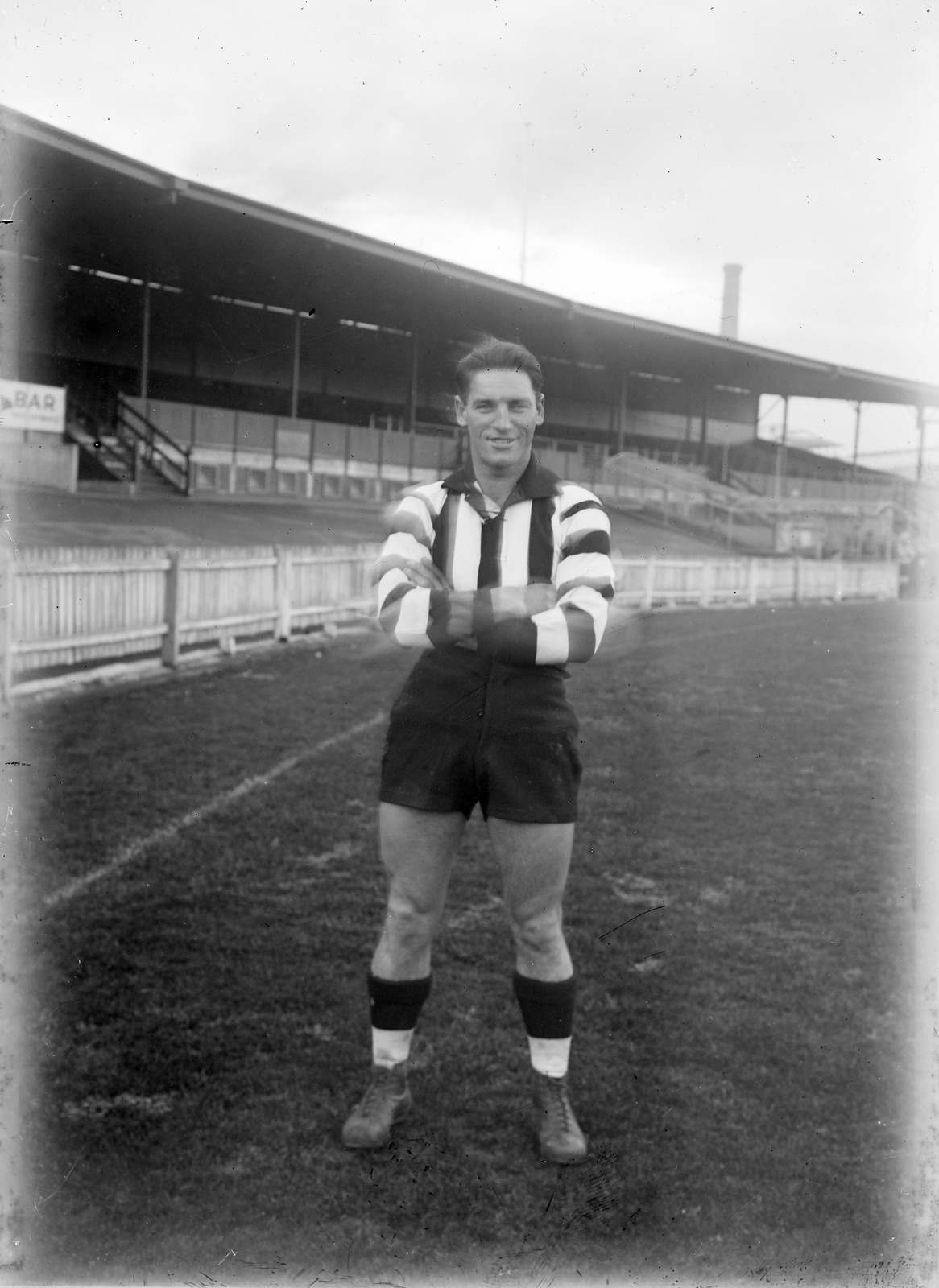

Personal information
- Full name: Charles Albert Francis Utting
- Born: 12 March 1923; Collingwood, Victoria
- Died: 11 October 2009 (aged 86)
- Original team: St Joseph's
- Height: 170 cm (5 ft 7 in)
- Weight: 74 kg (163 lb)
- Positions: Back pocket, centreman

Playing career^{1}
Years	Club	Games (Goals)
1943–1950	Collingwood	125 (17)
- ^{1} Playing statistics correct to the end of 1950.

Career highlights
- Copeland Trophy winner: 1950

Charles Utting (12 March 1923 – 11 October 2009) was an Australian rules footballer who debuted for Collingwood at the age of 20 in 1943. His career goal total was 17 from 125 games over 8 seasons. He was vice-captain and won the Copeland Trophy in 1950, his final season as he retired at only 27 years of age because of his involvement in his family's business.

Utting went on to coach the Collingwood Seconds from 1951 to 1953, was a member of the committee from 1968 to 1975, and was a Collingwood life member. He was also the nephew of Ern Utting who played for Collingwood and Hawthorn.

He was mayor of the City of Collingwood in 1976–77.
