= VFL/AFL games records =

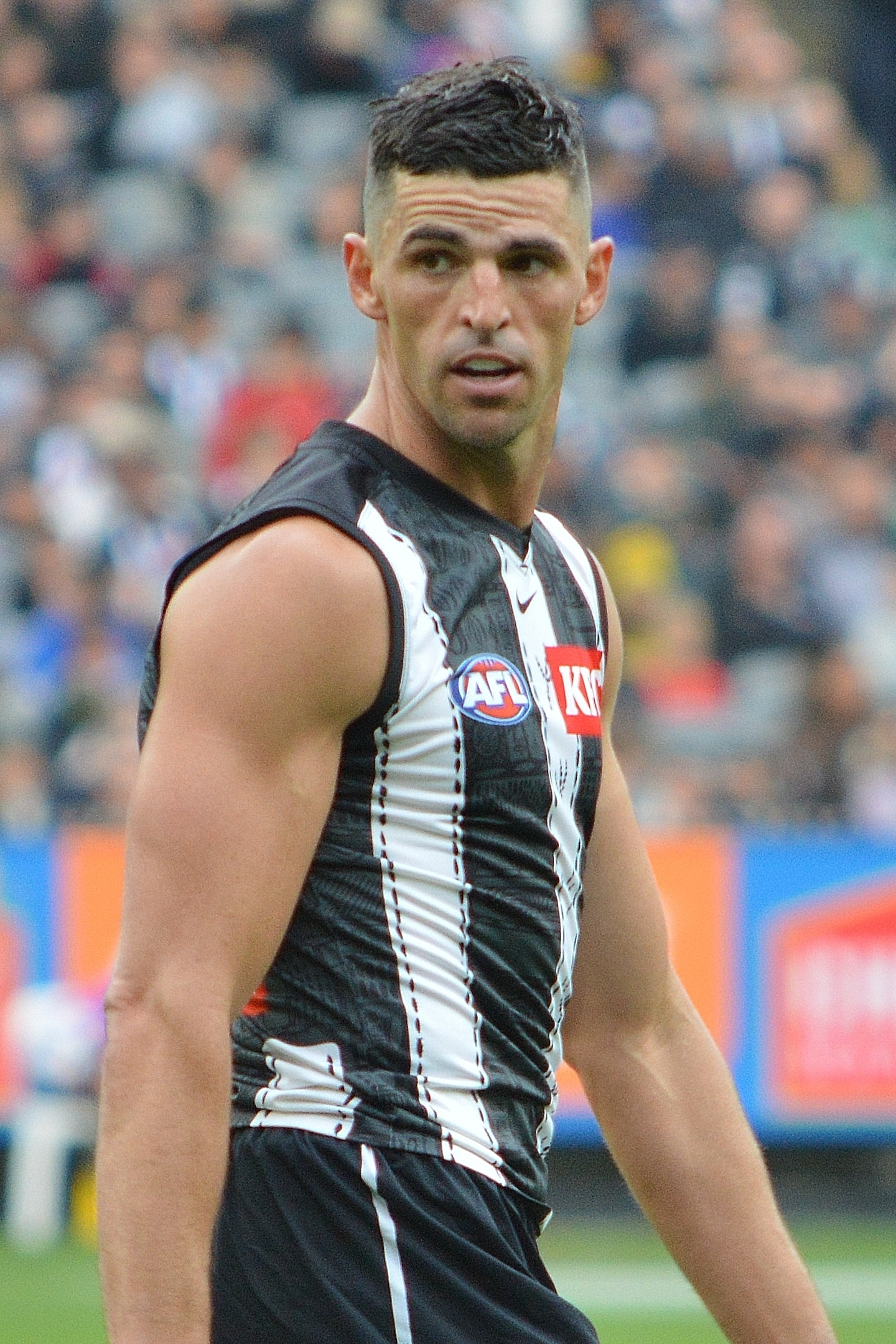
Former Collingwood captain Scott Pendlebury is the VFL/AFL games record holder with 442 games

This page is a collection of VFL/AFL games records. The Australian Football League (AFL), known as the Victorian Football League (VFL) until 1990, is the elite national competition in men's Australian rules football. This list only includes home-and-away matches and finals; representative games (i.e. State of Origin or international rules), pre-season and night series games are excluded from the totals.

== Most VFL/AFL games ==
Below are the players who have played at least 300 games at VFL/AFL level; this list of players is often colloquially referred to as "the 300 club". Individuals who have participated as a player, coach and/or umpire in 300 league-sanctioned senior games – including home-and-away, pre-season, state representative and international rules games – are awarded life membership of the AFL.

^{‡}	Most VFL/AFL games for that club
**Bold**	Current player

Updated to the end of the 2026 season.

#	Player	Games	Club(s)	Average per season	Career span	Ref.
1	**Scott Pendlebury**	**442**^{‡}	**Collingwood**^{‡}	**21.05**	**2006–present**	
2	Brent Harvey	432^{‡}	North Melbourne/Kangaroos^{‡}	20.57	1996–2016	
3	Michael Tuck	426^{‡}	Hawthorn^{‡}	20.29	1971–1991	
4	Shaun Burgoyne	407	Port Adelaide (157 games; 2001–2009)	19.38	2001–2021	
4	Shaun Burgoyne	407	Hawthorn (250 games; 2010–2021)	19.38	2001–2021	
5	Kevin Bartlett	403^{‡}	Richmond^{‡}	21.21	1965–1983	
6	Dustin Fletcher	400^{‡}	Essendon^{‡}	17.39	1993–2015	
7	Travis Boak	387^{‡}	Port Adelaide^{‡}	20.37	2007–2025	
8	Robert Harvey	383^{‡}	St Kilda^{‡}	18.24	1988–2008	
9	**Patrick Dangerfield**	**379**	Adelaide (154 games; 2008–2015)	**19.95**	**2008–present**	
9	**Patrick Dangerfield**	**379**	**Geelong (225 games; 2016–present)**	**19.95**	**2008–present**	
10	Simon Madden	378	Essendon	19.89	1974–1992	
11	David Mundy	376^{‡}	Fremantle^{‡}	19.79	2004–2022	
12	Craig Bradley	375^{‡}	Carlton^{‡}	22.06	1986–2002	
12	Steele Sidebottom	375	Collingwood	20.83	2009–2026	
14	Adam Goodes	372^{‡}	Sydney^{‡}	21.88	1999–2015	
15	Bernie Quinlan	366	Footscray (177 games; 1969–1977)	20.33	1969–1986	
15	Bernie Quinlan	366	Fitzroy (189 games; 1978–1986)	20.33	1969–1986	
16	Brad Johnson	364^{‡}	Footscray/Western Bulldogs^{‡}	21.41	1994–2010	
17	John Blakey	359	Fitzroy (135 games; 1985–1992)	19.94	1985–2002	
17	John Blakey	359	North Melbourne/Kangaroos (224 games; 1993–2002)	19.94	1985–2002	
17	Tom Hawkins	359^{‡}	Geelong^{‡}	19.94	2007–2024	
19	Gary Ablett Jr.	357	Geelong (247 games; 2002–2010, 2018–2020)	18.79	2002–2020	
19	Gary Ablett Jr.	357	Gold Coast (110 games; 2011–2017)	18.79	2002–2020	
20	Bruce Doull	356	Carlton	19.78	1969–1986	
20	Paul Roos	356	Fitzroy (269 games; 1982–1994)	20.94	1982–1998	
20	Paul Roos	356	Sydney (87 games; 1995–1998)	20.94	1982–1998	
22	Joel Selwood	355	Geelong	22.19	2007–2022	
23	Lance Franklin	354	Hawthorn (182 games; 2005–2013)	18.63	2005–2023	
23	Lance Franklin	354	Sydney (172 games; 2014–2023)	18.63	2005–2023	
24	Matthew Pavlich	353	Fremantle	20.76	2000–2016	
25	Doug Hawkins	350	Footscray (329 games; 1978–1994)	19.44	1978–1995	
25	Doug Hawkins	350	Fitzroy (21 games; 1995)	19.44	1978–1995	
25	Eddie Betts	350	Carlton (218 games; 2005–2013, 2020–2021)	20.59	2005–2021	
25	Eddie Betts	350	Adelaide (132 games; 2014–2019)	20.59	2005–2021	
27	Jack Riewoldt	347	Richmond	20.41	2007–2023	
28	Luke Hodge	346	Hawthorn (305 games; 2002–2017)	19.22	2002–2019	
28	Luke Hodge	346	Brisbane Lions (41 games; 2018–2019)	19.22	2002–2019	
29	Todd Goldstein	345	Kangaroos/North Melbourne (315 games; 2007–2023)	18.16	2007–2025	
29	Todd Goldstein	345	Essendon (30 games; 2024–2025)	18.16	2007–2025	
30	Kade Simpson	342	Carlton	19.00	2003–2020	
30	**Jack Darling**	**342**	West Coast (298 games; 2011–2024)	**21.38**	**2011–present**	
30	**Jack Darling**	**342**	**North Melbourne (44 games; 2025–present)**	**21.38**	**2011–present**	
32	Chris Grant	341	Footscray/Western Bulldogs	18.94	1990–2007	
33	Andrew McLeod	340^{‡}	Adelaide^{‡}	21.25	1995–2010	
34	**Luke Parker**	**338**	Sydney (293 games; 2011–2024)	**21.13**	**2011–present**	
34	**Luke Parker**	**338**	**North Melbourne (45 games; 2025–present)**	**21.13**	**2011–present**	
35	John Rantall	336	South Melbourne (260 games; 1963–1972, 1976–1979)	18.67	1963–1980	
35	John Rantall	336	North Melbourne (70 games; 1973–1975)	18.67	1963–1980	
35	John Rantall	336	Fitzroy (6 games; 1980)	18.67	1963–1980	
35	Nick Riewoldt	336	St Kilda	19.76	2001–2017	
37	Brendon Goddard	334	St Kilda (205 games; 2003–2012)	20.88	2003–2018	
37	Brendon Goddard	334	Essendon (129 games; 2013–2018)	20.88	2003–2018	
38	Kevin Murray	333^{‡}	Fitzroy^{‡}	18.50	1955–1964, 1967–1974	
38	David Cloke	333	Richmond (219 games; 1974–1982, 1990–1991)	18.50	1974–1991	
38	David Cloke	333	Collingwood (114 games; 1983–1989)	18.50	1974–1991	
38	Shannon Hurn	333^{‡}	West Coast^{‡}	18.50	2006–2023	
41	Leigh Matthews	332	Hawthorn	19.53	1969–1985	
41	Justin Madden	332	Essendon (45 games; 1980–1982)	19.53	1980–1996	
41	Justin Madden	332	Carlton (287 games; 1983–1996)	19.53	1980–1996	
41	Corey Enright	332	Geelong	20.75	2001–2016	
41	Drew Petrie	332	Kangaroos/North Melbourne (316 games; 2001–2016)	19.53	2001–2017	
41	Drew Petrie	332	West Coast (16 games; 2017)	19.53	2001–2017	
45	Gary Dempsey	329	Footscray (207 games; 1967–1978)	18.28	1967–1984	
45	Gary Dempsey	329	North Melbourne (122 games; 1979–1984)	18.28	1967–1984	
45	Sam Mitchell	329	Hawthorn (307 games; 2002–2016)	20.56	2002–2017	
45	Sam Mitchell	329	West Coast (22 games; 2017)	20.56	2002–2017	
47	John Nicholls	328	Carlton	18.22	1957–1974	
47	Barry Round	328	Footscray (135 games; 1969–1975)	19.29	1969–1985	
47	Barry Round	328	South Melbourne/Sydney (193 games; 1976–1985)	19.29	1969–1985	
49	Callan Ward	327	Western Bulldogs (60 games; 2008–2011)	18.17	2008–2025	
49	Callan Ward	327	Greater Western Sydney (267 games; 2012–2025)	18.17	2008–2025	
50	Ian Nankervis	325	Geelong	19.12	1967–1983	
50	Jason Akermanis	325	Brisbane Bears (38 games; 1995–1996)	20.31	1995–2010	
50	Jason Akermanis	325	Brisbane Lions (210 games; 1997–2006)	20.31	1995–2010	
50	Jason Akermanis	325	Western Bulldogs (77 games; 2007–2010)	20.31	1995–2010	
50	Jude Bolton	325	Sydney	21.67	1999–2013	
50	Jarrad McVeigh	325	Sydney	20.31	2004–2019	
50	Heath Shaw	325	Collingwood (173 games; 2004–2013)	19.12	2004–2020	
50	Heath Shaw	325	Greater Western Sydney (152 games; 2014–2020)	19.12	2004–2020	
55	Paul Salmon	324	Essendon (224 games; 1983–1995, 2002)	17.05	1983–2000, 2002	
55	Paul Salmon	324	Hawthorn (100 games; 1996–2000)	17.05	1983–2000, 2002	
55	Scott West	324	Footscray/Western Bulldogs	20.25	1993–2008	
57	Nathan Burke	323	St Kilda	19.00	1987–2003	
58	Simon Black	322^{‡}	Brisbane Lions^{‡}	20.13	1998–2013	
58	Nick Dal Santo	322	St Kilda (260 games; 2002–2013)	21.47	2002–2016	
58	Nick Dal Santo	322	North Melbourne (62 games; 2014–2016)	21.47	2002–2016	
60	Ted Whitten	321	Footscray	16.05	1951–1970	
60	Stewart Loewe	321	St Kilda	18.88	1986–2002	
60	Tyson Edwards	321	Adelaide	20.06	1995–2010	
60	**Lachie Neale**	**321**	Fremantle (135 games; 2012–2018)	**21.40**	**2012–present**	
60	**Lachie Neale**	**321**	**Brisbane Lions (186 games; 2019–present)**	**21.40**	**2012–present**	
60	**Dayne Zorko**	**321**	**Brisbane Lions**	**21.40**	**2012–present**	
65	Dick Reynolds	320	Essendon	16.84	1933–1951	
66	Jordan Lewis	319	Hawthorn (264 games; 2005–2016)	21.27	2005–2019	
66	Jordan Lewis	319	Melbourne (55 games; 2017–2019)	21.27	2005–2019	
66	Taylor Walker	319	Adelaide	16.79	2008–2026	
68	Marcus Ashcroft	318	Brisbane Bears (152 games; 1989–1996)	21.20	1989–2003	
68	Marcus Ashcroft	318	Brisbane Lions (166 games; 1997–2003)	21.20	1989–2003	
69	**Mark Blicavs**	**315**	**Geelong**	**22.50**	**2013–present**	
70	Terry Daniher	313	South Melbourne (19 games; 1976–1977)	18.41	1976–1992	
70	Terry Daniher	313	Essendon (294 games; 1978–1992)	18.41	1976–1992	
70	Tony Shaw	313	Collingwood	17.39	1977–1994	
70	Roger Merrett	313	Essendon (149 games; 1978–1987)	16.47	1978–1996	
70	Roger Merrett	313	Brisbane Bears (164 games; 1988–1996)^{‡}	16.47	1978–1996	
70	James Kelly	313	Geelong (273 games; 2002–2015)	19.56	2002–2017	
70	James Kelly	313	Essendon (40 games; 2016–2017)	19.56	2002–2017	
74	Stephen Silvagni	312	Carlton	18.35	1985–2001	
74	Mark Ricciuto	312	Adelaide	20.80	1993–2007	
74	Robert Murphy	312	Western Bulldogs	17.33	2000–2017	
77	Jack Dyer	311	Richmond	16.42	1931–1949	
77	Ben Hart	311	Adelaide	20.73	1992–2006	
77	Glenn Archer	311	North Melbourne/Kangaroos	19.44	1992–2007	
80	Scott Thompson	308	Melbourne (39 games; 2001–2004)	18.12	2001–2017	
80	Scott Thompson	308	Adelaide (269 games; 2005–2017)	18.12	2001–2017	
80	Luke Breust	308	Hawthorn	20.53	2011–2025	
82	Tim Watson	307	Essendon	18.06	1977–1991, 1993–1994	
83	Gordon Coventry	306	Collingwood	17.00	1920–1937	
83	Wayne Schimmelbusch	306	North Melbourne	20.40	1973–1987	
83	Alastair Lynch	306	Fitzroy (120 games; 1988–1993)	18.00	1988–2004	
83	Alastair Lynch	306	Brisbane Bears (32 games; 1994–1996)	18.00	1988–2004	
83	Alastair Lynch	306	Brisbane Lions (154 games; 1997–2004)	18.00	1988–2004	
83	Paul Williams	306	Collingwood (189 games; 1991–2000)	19.13	1991–2006	
83	Paul Williams	306	Sydney (117 games; 2001–2006)	19.13	1991–2006	
83	David Neitz	306^{‡}	Melbourne^{‡}	19.13	1993–2008	
83	Adam Simpson	306	North Melbourne/Kangaroos	20.40	1995–2009	
83	Trent Cotchin	306	Richmond	19.13	2008–2023	
90	Shane Crawford	305	Hawthorn	19.06	1993–2008	
90	Jimmy Bartel	305	Geelong	20.33	2002–2016	
90	Mitch Duncan	305	Geelong	19.06	2010–2025	
93	Russell Greene	304	St Kilda (120 games; 1974–1980)	20.27	1974–1988	
93	Russell Greene	304	Hawthorn (184 games; 1980–1988)	20.27	1974–1988	
94	Chris Langford	303	Hawthorn	20.20	1983–1997	
94	Michael O'Loughlin	303	Sydney	20.20	1995–2009	
94	Shane Edwards	303	Richmond	18.94	2007–2022	
97	Don Scott	302	Hawthorn	20.13	1967–1981	
97	Luke Power	302	Brisbane Lions (282 games; 1998–2011)	20.13	1998–2012	
97	Luke Power	302	Greater Western Sydney (20 games; 2012)	20.13	1998–2012	
97	Nathan Jones	302	Melbourne	18.88	2006–2021	
97	Dustin Martin	302	Richmond	20.13	2010–2024	
97	**Jack Gunston**	**302**	Adelaide (14 games; 2010–2011)	**17.76**	**2010–present**	
97	**Jack Gunston**	**302**	**Hawthorn (271 games; 2012–2022; 2024–present)**	**17.76**	**2010–present**	
97	**Jack Gunston**	**302**	Brisbane Lions (17 games; 2023)	**17.76**	**2010–present**	
102	Len Thompson	301	Collingwood (268 games; 1965–1978)	18.81	1965–1980	
102	Len Thompson	301	South Melbourne (20 games; 1979)	18.81	1965–1980	
102	Len Thompson	301	Fitzroy (13 games; 1980)	18.81	1965–1980	
102	Shannon Grant	301	Sydney (58 games; 1995–1997)	21.50	1995–2008	
102	Shannon Grant	301	North Melbourne/Kangaroos (243 games; 1998–2008)	21.50	1995–2008	
104	Sam Newman	300	Geelong	17.65	1964–1980	
104	Barry Breen	300	St Kilda	16.67	1965–1982	
104	Francis Bourke	300	Richmond	20.00	1967–1981	
104	Kelvin Moore	300	Hawthorn	20.00	1970–1984	
104	Garry Foulds	300	Essendon	18.75	1974–1989	
104	Mick Martyn	300	North Melbourne/Kangaroos (287 games; 1988–2002)	18.75	1988–2003	
104	Mick Martyn	300	Carlton (13 games; 2003)	18.75	1988–2003	
104	Gavin Wanganeen	300	Essendon (127 games; 1991–1996)	18.75	1991–2006	
104	Gavin Wanganeen	300	Port Adelaide (173 games; 1997–2006)	18.75	1991–2006	
104	Rohan Smith	300	Footscray/Western Bulldogs	20.00	1992–2006	
104	Kane Cornes	300	Port Adelaide	20.00	2001–2015	
104	Marc Murphy	300	Carlton	18.75	2006–2021	
104	**Bradley Hill**	**300**	Hawthorn (95 games; 2012–2016)	**20.00**	**2012–present**	
104	**Bradley Hill**	**300**	Fremantle (54 games; 2017–2019)	**20.00**	**2012–present**	
104	**Bradley Hill**	**300**	**St Kilda (151 games; 2020–present)**	**20.00**	**2012–present**	

== Club games record holders ==
Below are the players who hold the record for most games played at their respective clubs.

^{§}	VFL/AFL games record holder
**Bold**	Current player

Updated to the end of the 2026 season.

Club	Player	Games	Seasons	Ref.
Adelaide	Andrew McLeod	340	1995–2010	
Brisbane Bears	Roger Merrett	164	1988–1996	
Brisbane Lions	Simon Black	322	1998–2013	
Carlton	Craig Bradley	375	1986–2002	
Collingwood	**Scott Pendlebury**^{§}	**442**^{§}	**2006–present**^{§}	
Essendon	Dustin Fletcher	400	1993–2015	
Fitzroy	Kevin Murray	333	1955–1964, 1967–1974	
Footscray/Western Bulldogs	Brad Johnson	364	1994–2010	
Fremantle	David Mundy	376	2004–2022	
Geelong	Tom Hawkins	359	2007–2024	
Gold Coast	David Swallow	249	2011–2025	
Greater Western Sydney	**Toby Greene**	**282**	**2012–present**	
Hawthorn	Michael Tuck	426	1971–1991	
Melbourne	David Neitz	306	1993–2008	
North Melbourne/Kangaroos	Brent Harvey	432	1996–2016	
Port Adelaide	Travis Boak	387	2007–2025	
Richmond	Kevin Bartlett	403	1965–1983	
South Melbourne/Sydney	Adam Goodes	372	1999–2015	
St Kilda	Robert Harvey	383	1988–2008	
University	Herbert Hurrey	101	1908–1913	
West Coast	Shannon Hurn	333	2006–2023	

== VFL/AFL games record holder ==
Below are the players who have held the record for the most games played at VFL/AFL level, beginning with the first player to reach 100 games.

**Bold**	Current player

Updated to the end of the 2026 season.

Player	Total to break record	Record broken	Career games	Club(s)	Career span
Charlie Pannam	First to reach 100 games (round 14, 1902)		193	Collingwood (179 games; 1897–1907)	1897–1908
Charlie Pannam	First to reach 100 games (round 14, 1902)		193	Richmond (14 games; 1908)	1897–1908
Fred Elliott	194	Grand final, 1910	209	Melbourne (12 games; 1899)	1899–1901, 1903–1911
Fred Elliott	194	Grand final, 1910	209	Carlton (197 games; 1900–1901, 1903–1911)	1899–1901, 1903–1911
Jock McHale	210	Round 10, 1914	261	Collingwood	1903–1920
Vic Thorp	262	Round 15, 1925	263	Richmond	1910–1925
Gordon Coventry	264	Round 11, 1935	306	Collingwood	1920–1937
Jack Dyer	307	Round 9, 1949	311	Richmond	1931–1949
Dick Reynolds	312	Round 13, 1950	320	Essendon	1933–1951
Ted Whitten	321	Round 5, 1970	321	Footscray	1951–1970
John Nicholls	322	Round 9, 1974	328	Carlton	1957–1974
Kevin Murray	329	Round 18, 1974	333	Fitzroy	1955–1964, 1967–1974
John Rantall	334	Round 7, 1980	336	South Melbourne (260 games; 1963–1972, 1976–1979)	1963–1980
John Rantall	334	Round 7, 1980	336	North Melbourne (70 games; 1973–1975)	1963–1980
John Rantall	334	Round 7, 1980	336	Fitzroy (6 games; 1980)	1963–1980
Kevin Bartlett	337	Qualifying final, 1980	403	Richmond	1965–1983
Michael Tuck	404	Round 22, 1990	426	Hawthorn	1971–1991
Brent Harvey	427	Round 19, 2016	432	North Melbourne/Kangaroos	1996–2016
**Scott Pendlebury**	**433**	**Round 11, 2026**	**442**	**Collingwood**	**2006–present**

== See also ==
- VFL/AFL goalkicking records
- AFL Women's games records

== Sources ==
- Most career games at AFL Tables
- Every AFL player at Australian Football
