= Paul Licuria =

Australian rules footballer, born 1978

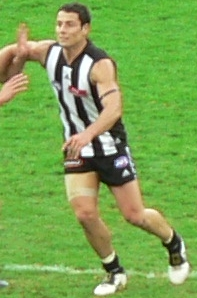
- Licuria playing for Collingwood during the 2006 AFL season

Personal information
- Full name: Paul Licuria
- Born: 4 January 1978 (age 48); Victoria, Australia
- Original team: Keon Park Stars/ Northern U18
- Height: 179 cm (5 ft 10 in)
- Weight: 86 kg (190 lb)

Playing career^{1}
| Years | Club | Games (Goals) |
| 1997–1998 | Sydney | 10 (2) |
| 1999–2007 | Collingwood | 182 (70) |
| Total | | 192 (72) |
- ^{1} Playing statistics correct to the end of 2007.

Career highlights
- Copeland Trophy 2001, 2002; AFL Rising Star nominee: 1999

Paul Licuria (born 4 January 1978) is a former professional Australian rules footballer who played for the Sydney Swans and Collingwood Football Club in the Australian Football League (AFL).

== AFL career ==
=== Sydney Swans ===
Licuria was drafted to Sydney in the 1995 National Draft as a second round selection, after having two knee reconstructions at ages 16 and 17. He was recruited as a hard-working midfielder but also was rumoured as a recruit to keep Anthony Rocca at the club as they were good friends. Licuria struggled to get a spot in the side after his debut in 1997. He played 4 games in 1997, and then only 6 more in 1998, not having the impact he would have liked.

=== Collingwood Football Club ===
Licuria was traded to the club he supported as a child, Collingwood, as part of a deal which saw Sydney receive their first round selection, (no.3 overall). Licuria immediately made an impact at the club with his ability to win the ball off half-back; however, his disposal let him down, and his consistency had dropped off, causing him to be dropped halfway through his first year. However, he came back into the side and won a Rising Star nomination for a 28 possession game against the West Coast Eagles. His form at the time showed signs of what was to come and he carried this form into the 2000 season, finishing 6th in the club's best and fairest, and playing every game with an average of 21 touches.

His 2001 and 2002 seasons were brilliant. His disposal was once again questioned, but his incredible workrate and consistency were rated very highly. He played every game in both seasons, averaging 23 and 22 touches a game in respective seasons. He capped both terrific seasons by winning the Copeland Trophy. It stunned everyone with his win in 2001, but in 2002 it was expected in the year the club made it to the Grand Final. Licuria's final series was fantastic. Despite a poor performance in the big game, he would achieve a career-high 40 disposals in the Qualifying Final against Port Adelaide and in the 2002 Grand final loss to Brisbane he and Mick Malthouse showed their disappointment in tears, with Licuria visibly crying.

His 2003 season was productive also, managing 24 games, missing round 1 through suspension, and breaking a consecutive games run of 74 games. He played all games once again in 2004 and 2005, being noted as one of the most durable midfielders, despite his knee problems early in his career. He finished runner-up in the 2004 best and fairest, once again showing his importance to the side. However, 2006 would see Licuria exposed as a tiring player, with his use of the ball continually debated, and his consistency being questioned. He was rested in Round 16 after an inconsistent start to the year, with highs and lows. He played for Williamstown in the VFL but forced his way back into the side after one week in the reserves. After playing few games during the 2007 season, Licuria retired from the AFL at the end of the season. In 2011, Licuria was inducted into the Collingwood Hall of Fame.

=== Collingwood Reserves ===
After Paul retired from AFL football in 2007 he was appointed team manager, with Eddie Hillgrove, of the newly formed Collingwood VFL side under the team's head coach Gavin Brown. Paul also played for the VFL side in the 2008 season and now plays in the VAFA.

== Post AFL ==
Licuria became a contestant on the Channel Seven series Dancing with the Stars for the 2008 series of the show. Overall, Licuria finished third in the competition.

He played for Victorian Amateur Football Association club Old Scotch in 2009.

Licuria is currently the CEO of the online education training company alffie.

Licuria is also a member of the Collingwood Football Club Board.

== Personal life ==
Paul married British born Barbara Hawley on 15 February 2008. They have a daughter, Saffron Ursula Louisa (born July 2009), and a son Cassius (born October 2011).
