= Wayne Richardson =

Australian rules footballer from Australia

Personal information
- Born: 8 December 1946 (age 79); Western Australia
- Original team: South Fremantle (WANFL)
- Height: 179 cm (5 ft 10 in)
- Weight: 76 kg (168 lb)

Playing career^{1}
Years	Club	Games (Goals)
1966–1978	Collingwood	277 (323)

Representative team honours
Years	Team	Games (Goals)
	Victoria	5 (4)
- ^{1} Playing statistics correct to the end of 1978.

Career highlights
- Collingwood best and fairest 1971, 1974; Collingwood captain 1971–1975; Australian Football World Tour 1968; Collingwood Team of the Century; Australian Football Hall of Fame 2003 inductee

Wayne Richardson (born 8 December 1946) is a former Australian rules footballer who played for Collingwood Football Club in the Victorian Football League (VFL).

Richardson was recruited to Collingwood from South Fremantle Football Club in the West Australian National Football League. South Fremantle would not clear Richardson to Collingwood so he ended up sitting out the 1965 season.

Richardson played predominantly as an onballer for Collingwood. He won Collingwood's best and fairest, the Copeland Trophy, in 1971 and 1974. And also captained the club from 1971 to 1975.

In 1996, Richardson was named on the interchange in Collingwood's Team of the Century.

Wayne's brother Max Richardson played 211 games for Collingwood from 1969–1978, and another 30 for Fitzroy Football Club in 1979–1980. His son Mark Richardson played 141 games for Collingwood from 1992–2002.
