= Scott Pendlebury =

Australian rules footballer (born 1988)

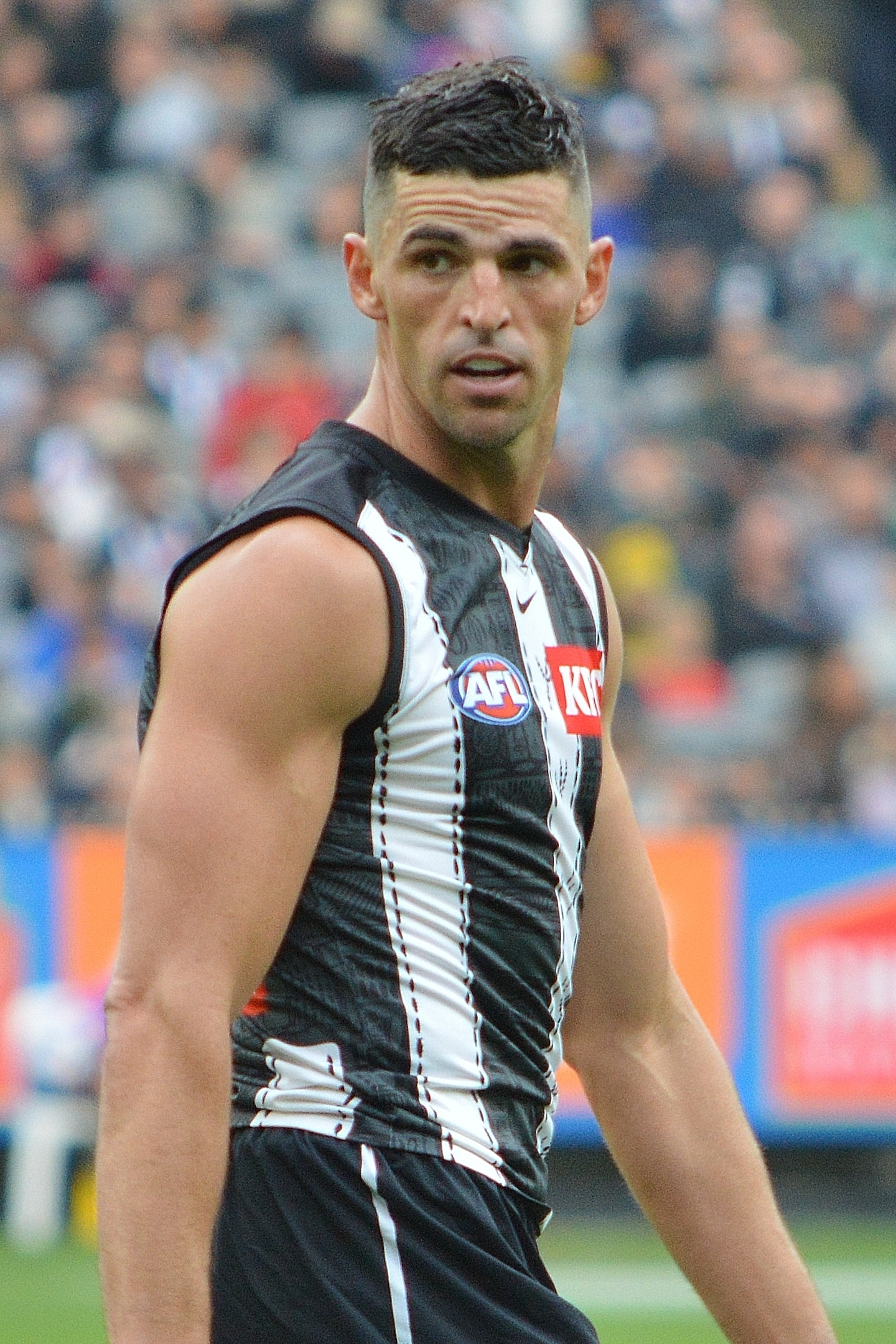
- Pendlebury playing for Collingwood in 2025

Personal information
- Full name: Scott Pendlebury
- Nicknames: Pendles, Dippa
- Born: 7 January 1988 (age 38); Sale, Victoria
- Original team: Gippsland Power (TAC Cup)
- Draft: No. 5, 2005 national draft
- Debut: Round 10, 2006, Collingwood vs. Brisbane Lions, at the Melbourne Cricket Ground
- Height: 191 cm (6 ft 3 in)
- Weight: 86 kg (190 lb)
- Position: Midfielder

Club information
- Current club: Gold Coast
- Number: 7

Playing career^{1}
Years	Club	Games (Goals)
2006–2026	Collingwood	442 (209)
2027–	Gold Coast	0 (0)
Total		442 (209)

Representative team honours^{2}
Years	Team	Games (Goals)
2008, 2020	Victoria	2 (0)
2008–2017	Australia	3 (0)
- ^{1} Playing statistics correct to the end of the 2026 season.^{2} Representative statistics correct as of 2020.

Career highlights
- 2× AFL premiership player: 2010, 2023; Norm Smith Medal: 2010 replay; Collingwood captain: 2014–2022; AFLCA champion player of the year: 2013; VFL/AFL games record holder; 6× All-Australian team: 2010, 2011, 2012, 2013, 2014, 2019; 5× Copeland Trophy: 2011, 2013, 2014, 2015, 2016; 2× AFLPA best captain: 2020, 2022; AFLCA best young player: 2007; 4× Anzac Medal: 2010, 2011, 2019, 2026; AFL Rising Star nominee: 2007

Scott Pendlebury (born 7 January 1988) is a professional Australian rules footballer playing for the Gold Coast Suns in the Australian Football League (AFL). He previously played for the Collingwood Football Club from 2006 to 2026, where he served as the club's captain from 2014 to 2022. Pendlebury is the VFL/AFL games record holder with 442 games, and also holds the record (alongside Steele Sidebottom) for most games played together as teammates with 340 games.

Pendlebury is a dual premiership player, winning the Norm Smith Medal as best on ground in the 2010 Grand Final replay, and won the AFLCA champion player of the year award in 2013. He is a six-time All-Australian and five-time Copeland Trophy winner, and is the league record holder for disposals, handballs and tackles.

== Early life ==
Originally from Sale in the Gippsland Region of Victoria, Pendlebury began his sporting career playing basketball and accepted a scholarship to the Australian Institute of Sport in Canberra; however, after three weeks at the AIS, he decided to quit the under-18s squad and return to Victoria to pursue representative football with the Gippsland Power in the TAC Cup. Pendlebury's vacated place in the AIS squad was taken by Patty Mills, who went on to win an NBA Championship in 2014 with the San Antonio Spurs. Growing up, Pendlebury supported the Melbourne Football Club.

Pendlebury was selected for the 2005 under-18 Vic Country team. He played two of the three games and had an average of 17 possessions.

He was selected to play for eventual 2005 TAC Cup premiers Gippsland Power. He played 19 games, kicked 11 goals and averaged 22 possessions a game. Collingwood became aware of Pendlebury after Gippsland Power manager Peter Francis recommended both Pendlebury and his older brother Kristopher. Collingwood drafted Scott Pendlebury with pick five in the 2005 AFL draft, and Collingwood's number two pick overall, whereas Kris did not play in the AFL but did captain the Collingwood side in the Victorian Football League.

== AFL career ==
=== Collingwood (2006–2026) ===
==== 2006 ====
Pendlebury's 2006 pre-season was hampered by glandular fever, but he made a successful comeback with Collingwood's VFL affiliate, Williamstown. He made his AFL debut in Round 10 against the Brisbane Lions, and became part of a select group of footballers known for kicking their first goal with their first kick in league football. He played eight more games in the 2006 season.

==== 2007 ====
Pendlebury switched to the number 10 guernsey previously worn by Blake Caracella, and gave the number 16 guernsey to newcomer Nathan Brown. Following his nine games in 2006, Pendlebury broke into the Collingwood midfield on a regular basis, averaging 18 disposals a game before he was nominated for the NAB Rising Star in Round 4. He collected a season-high 26 possessions in the 2007 semi-final against the West Coast Eagles in Perth, and kicked a crucial goal during extra time.

Throughout the 2007 season, he was compared with Geelong rookie midfielder Joel Selwood. Both were close favourites for the 2007 NAB Rising Star with Selwood eventually winning by seven votes. Pendlebury also placed second in the 2007 Copeland Trophy behind Travis Cloke.

==== 2008 ====
Pendlebury was voted into Collingwood's five-man leadership group as deputy vice-captain preceding the 2008 season. Highlights of Pendlebury's season included 33 disposals against Essendon for the Anzac Day match and placing a close second behind Paul Medhurst for the Anzac Medal. On 9 May 2008, Pendlebury was selected in the Victorian Squad for the AFL Hall of Fame Tribute Match, with teammates Josh Fraser and Heath Shaw. Despite playing only half of the match, he collected 19 disposals with a 79% efficiency rating. Pendlebury was an important factor in Collingwood's 86-point victory over reigning premiers Geelong. Pendlebury played his 50th game on 9 August 2008 against St Kilda in Round 19. He finished third in Collingwood's 2008 Best and Fairest count.

==== 2009 ====
Pendlebury became more prominent in 2009. He collected a career-high 39 disposals against Melbourne Football Club on the Queen's Birthday and won the Women's Round medal. He had a career-high 22 kicks against the West Coast Eagles and another career-high 20 handballs against the Richmond Football Club. Despite missing a few games due to injuries, he was still shortlisted for selection as an All-Australian. He had an average of 26 disposals a game (13 kicks and 13 handballs) and averaged two goals per five games. His season ended with a cracked fibula bone injury in the qualifying final. Pendlebury polled 13 votes in the 2009 Brownlow Medal, the top-ranked Collingwood player.

==== 2010 ====
In 2010, Pendlebury won a spot in the All-Australian team and won the Anzac Medal. He polled 21 votes in the 2010 Brownlow Medal, to finish in fourth position. He won the 2010 Norm Smith Medal when Collingwood won the premiership.

==== 2011 ====
In 2011, Pendlebury won his second Anzac Medal as best on ground in Collingwood's 30-point win over Essendon. Three weeks later, against Geelong, he was controversially denied a goal from a free kick that would have won Collingwood the game. Ultimately, the Magpies lost by three points. He capped off the year, winning the Copeland Trophy for the best and fairest player at Collingwood, and the Bob Rose Trophy for being the best Collingwood player throughout the finals. In the Brownlow he polled 24 votes to finish equal third behind winner Dane Swan, Sam Mitchell (ineligible) and Nick Dal Santo.

==== 2012 ====
Pendlebury finished the season with 15 Brownlow votes, down on his 24 from the previous year, and helped the Magpies to a preliminary final, where they eventually lost to the Sydney Swans. He finished second in the Copeland Trophy to winner Dayne Beams and in front of three-time champion Dane Swan. He was also included in the All-Australian team for the third year running alongside teammates Swan and Dayne Beams.

==== 2013 ====
Pendlebury improved on his 2012 season, having arguably his best and most consistent season to date. Already touted as future captain of the Collingwood Football Club, Pendlebury helped lead the club brilliantly in 2013 and although Collingwood lost the elimination final to Port Adelaide, Pendlebury won his second Copeland Trophy beating former champion Dane Swan. He also had 21 votes in the Brownlow, only losing out to teammate Dane Swan for the highest votes for the Magpies. Pendlebury once again was included in the All-Australian squad being named on the wing. This was his fourth consecutive inclusion in the team.

==== 2014 ====
On 29 January, Pendlebury was appointed as captain replacing Nick Maxwell. Pendlebury thrived as captain, having one of his best seasons. At the end of the season, Pendlebury was selected for the fifth consecutive time as part of the All-Australian team and was awarded the Lou Richards Medal. He also won his third Copeland Trophy, the Magpie Army Player of the Year award and the Gavin Brown Award.

==== 2015 ====
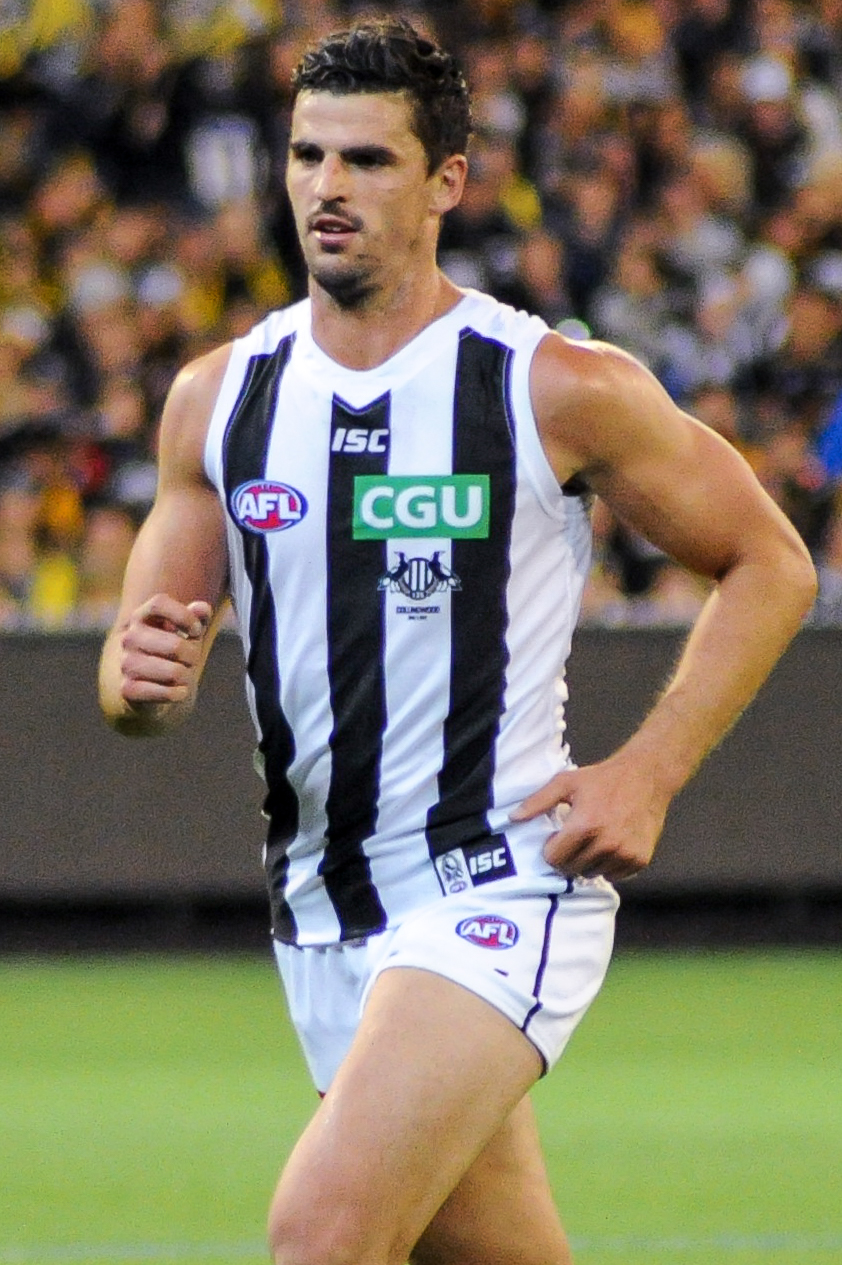
Pendlebury in 2017

During the 2015 Copeland Trophy event, Eddie McGuire announced that Pendlebury had re-signed with Collingwood until the end of 2020. Pendlebury said at the event: "The direction the club is taking really excites me. We have a solid group of young players who have got a taste of senior footy and we have the right program and people in place to take this group to the next level. I'm proud to captain this club and want to be part of what the future holds." The same night, he won his third consecutive Copeland Trophy and fourth overall.

==== 2016 ====
Pendlebury battled injury early in the season as well as filled in as a half-back instead of his regular role in the midfield; despite this, he maintained his consistency. His professionalism and inspiration prompted his peers to vote for him as the winner of the Gavin Brown Award for demonstrating the team values throughout the season. He was further rewarded with his fourth consecutive Copeland Trophy and fifth overall.

==== 2017 ====
Pendlebury had a consistent 2017 season until he sustained a broken finger in Round 17 against the Gold Coast Suns. He had successful surgery on the finger, and was hopeful to return the next week, but his return was delayed for a month and it was said to be unlikely that he would play again until Round 22 or 23. However, he did not return again for the season. In the 2017 season, he averaged a career-high tackles per game (6.4).

==== 2020 ====
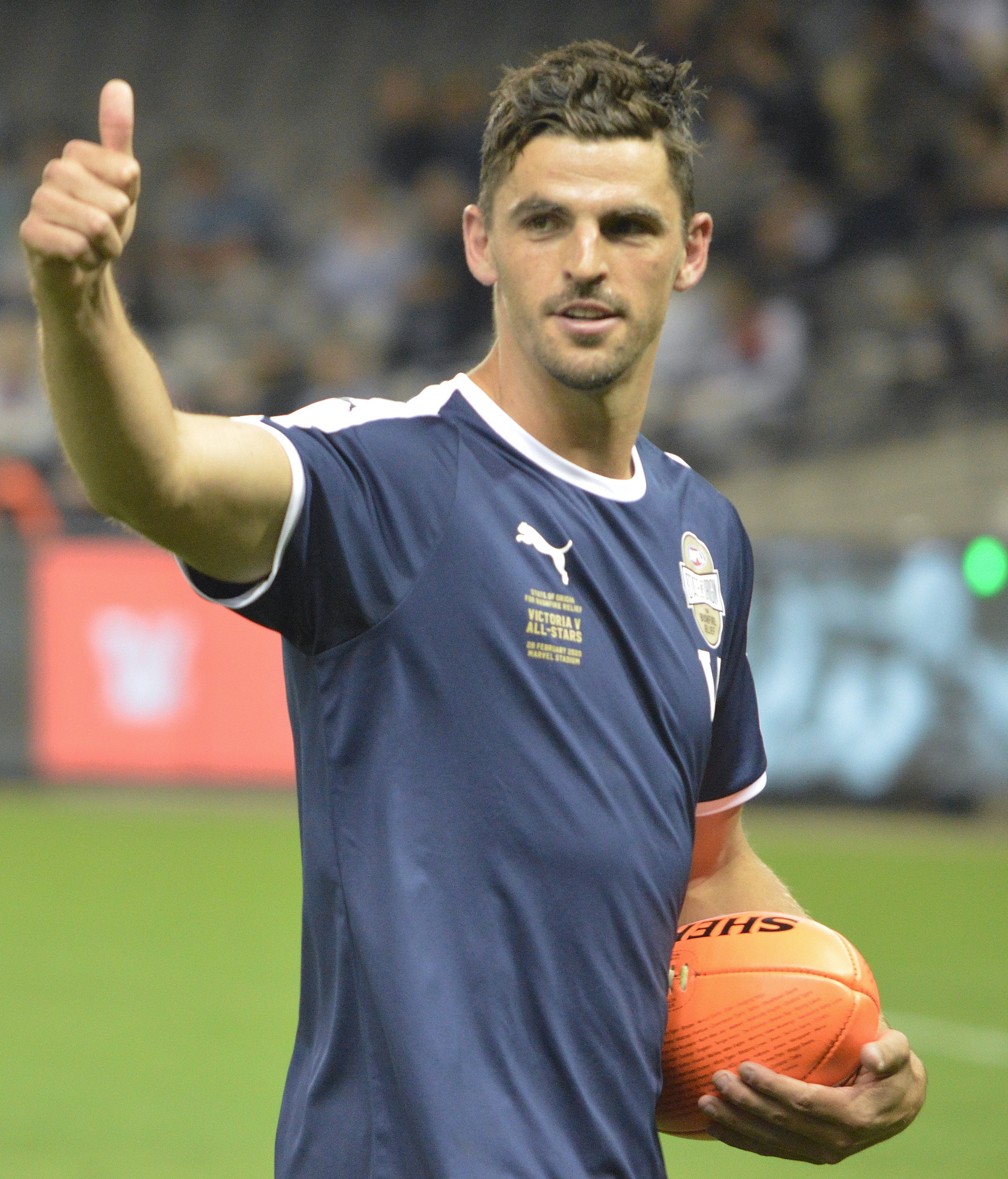
Pendlebury in 2020

In Round 18 of the 2020 season, he broke the Collingwood record for most VFL/AFL games played, as well as most games as captain.

==== 2022 ====
Pendlebury was awarded the AFLPA best captain award for the second time in his career, having previously won it in 2020. At the end of the 2022 season, he stood down as Collingwood captain after nine years in the role, the longest captaincy in the club's history.

==== 2023 ====
Pendlebury resigned his post as captain of Collingwood after the 2022 AFL season. In Round 17 of the 2023 AFL season, Pendlebury broke the VFL/AFL all-time disposal record, surpassing Robert Harvey. As a premiership player in the 2023 AFL Grand Final, Pendlebury broke his 13-year-long premiership drought, alongside Steele Sidebottom, which is a league record between premierships. This game also saw Pendlebury draw level with Gordon Coventry for the most AFL finals played at Collingwood, with 31 apiece.

==== 2024 ====
In 2024, Pendlebury became the first VFL/AFL player to reach 10,000 disposals. In Round 21 of the 2024 AFL season, in Collingwood's game against Carlton, Pendlebury became the sixth player in VFL/AFL history to play 400 games. Also during 2024, Pendlebury accepted a $2,500 fine after an off-the-ball incident in which he struck Brisbane Lions midfielder Lachie Neale in the stomach in a third-quarter passage of play. Pendlebury apologised to Neale after the match, saying "retaliator always gets caught, my mum taught me that — I got sucked in tonight."

==== 2025 ====
Pendlebury confirmed he would play on for a 20th season in 2025, signing a one-year contract extension, entering the season on 403 career games. Across the 2025 season he was managed carefully through interstate trips, sitting out the Round 9 trip to Perth as part of the club's planned workload management of the veteran, although he still played 22 games throughout the season, including finals.

==== 2026 ====
Pendlebury entered his 21st AFL season on 425 career games, needing just seven more appearances to surpass Brent Harvey's all-time VFL/AFL games record of 432 — a mark set in 2016. In his opening game of 2026 against St Kilda, Pendlebury drew level with Michael Tuck for second place on the all-time list with 426 games. In Round 1 against Adelaide, Pendlebury was involved in a collision with Crows defender Josh Worrell, which was graded as careless conduct, medium impact and high contact by the AFL's Match Review Officer — resulting in the first suspension of Pendlebury's 21-year career being proposed. In a two-hour Tribunal hearing on 17 March 2026, Tribunal Chairman Jeff Gleeson upheld the charge but downgraded the penalty from a one-match suspension to a $3,000 fine, citing "exceptional and compelling circumstances." Gleeson noted: "To have played 427 games of AFL football as a midfielder engaged in many thousands of contests over his career and to have never been suspended is clearly exceptional, when compared to the entire history of VFL/AFL players." The decision attracted widespread debate across the football world, with critics pointing out that a previous off-the-ball incident on Brisbane's Lachie Neale in 2024 had also been overlooked in the assessment of his record.

Pendlebury missed the Round 4 trip to Brisbane with Achilles tightness — consistent with the club's pre-season management plan for interstate travel. He returned for Round 5, which was during Gather Round and then produced one of the finest performances of his career on Anzac Day in Round 7, winning a record fourth Anzac Medal with a career-best 43 disposals, two goals, 10 marks, four clearances and 19 score involvements in a 77-point demolition of Essendon. Coach Craig McRae indicated after the game that Pendlebury was "probably unlikely" to back up in Round 8 against Hawthorn due to the five-day turnaround following Anzac Day. In Round 9 against Geelong, Pendlebury equalled Harvey's record of 432 games. The club confirming that his record-breaking 433rd game — designated "SP433" — was locked in for Round 11 of the Sir Doug Nicholls Round against West Coast Eagles at the MCG on 23 May 2026. Collingwood players wore a commemorative SP433 logo on the front of their guernsey, with Pendlebury wearing a gold number 10 on his back after receiving AFL approval. The other five members of the 400-game club were in attendance.

=== Gold Coast (2027–present) ===
==== 2027 ====
The morning after Collingwood's loss to the Western Bulldogs in the inaugural wildcard final, Pendlebury announced that he would depart the club during the 2026 player movement period to join the Gold Coast Suns on a hybrid four-year deal as he transitions into coaching (two as a player, and two as a coach).

The trade was confirmed in the subsequent trade period.

== Personal life ==
Pendlebury was born and raised in Sale, Victoria. He attended Catholic College Sale. He played alongside Collingwood players Dale Thomas, Tyson Goldsack, and Brent Macaffer at the Gippsland Power before they were all drafted to Collingwood. He has two brothers who have both played football in the Victorian Football League (VFL). Older brother Kris has won the Joseph Wren Memorial Trophy and captained the Collingwood VFL Football Club and younger brother Ryan has played for three teams in the VFL. Scott Pendlebury married his long-term girlfriend, Alex Pendlebury (née Davis), in 2016. The couple's first son was born in 2017, and they welcomed a daughter in November 2019. In March 2026, Pendlebury starred in the reality TV show Rivals: Sport vs. Sport representing "Team Aussie Rules" alongside Will Ashcroft, Monique Conti, and Matilda Scholz.

== Statistics ==
Updated to the end of round 22, 2026.

Legend
G	Goals	K	Kicks	D	Disposals	T	Tackles
B	Behinds	H	Handballs	M	Marks
#	Played in that season's premiership team

Season	Team	No.	Games	Totals							Averages (per game)							Votes
Season	Team	No.	Games	G	B	K	H	D	M	T	G	B	K	H	D	M	T	Votes
2006	Collingwood	16	9	4	0	67	51	118	46	25	0.4	0.0	7.4	5.7	13.1	5.1	2.8	0
2007	Collingwood	10	23	20	8	238	197	435	124	75	0.9	0.3	10.3	8.6	18.9	5.4	3.3	1
2008	Collingwood	10	23	11	10	283	235	518	113	77	0.5	0.4	12.3	10.2	22.5	4.9	3.3	7
2009	Collingwood	10	21	8	4	271	271	542	105	69	0.4	0.2	12.9	12.9	25.8	5.0	3.3	13
2010^{#}	Collingwood	10	26	17	13	339	352	691	116	144	0.7	0.5	13.0	13.5	26.6	4.5	5.5	21
2011	Collingwood	10	25	24	12	385	357	742	106	150	1.0	0.5	15.4	14.3	29.7	4.2	6.0	24
2012	Collingwood	10	21	11	8	316	303	619	82	115	0.5	0.4	15.0	14.4	29.5	3.9	5.5	15
2013	Collingwood	10	23	18	9	329	359	688	88	119	0.8	0.4	14.3	15.6	29.9	3.8	5.2	21
2014	Collingwood	10	21	13	10	292	304	596	75	116	0.6	0.5	13.9	14.5	28.4	3.6	5.5	16
2015	Collingwood	10	22	15	8	321	314	635	97	112	0.7	0.4	14.6	14.3	28.9	4.4	5.1	15
2016	Collingwood	10	22	11	7	289	341	630	78	123	0.5	0.3	13.1	15.5	28.6	3.5	5.6	17
2017	Collingwood	10	16	5	7	217	233	450	58	103	0.3	0.4	13.6	14.6	28.1	3.6	6.4	15
2018	Collingwood	10	25	9	5	294	376	670	60	147	0.4	0.2	11.8	15.0	26.8	2.4	5.9	15
2019	Collingwood	10	24	12	8	345	310	655	105	112	0.5	0.3	14.4	12.9	27.3	4.4	4.7	14
2020 (Note: The 2020 season was played with 17 home-and-away matches per team (down from 22) and 16-minute quarters with time on (down from 20-minute quarters with time on) due to the impact of the COVID-19 pandemic.)	Collingwood	10	15	1	2	176	179	355	38	46	0.1	0.1	11.7	11.9	23.7	2.5	3.1	13
2021	Collingwood	10	18	4	4	197	220	417	67	69	0.2	0.2	10.9	12.2	23.2	3.7	3.8	6
2022	Collingwood	10	24	2	1	274	281	555	74	112	0.1	0.0	11.4	11.7	23.1	3.1	4.7	2
2023^{#}	Collingwood	10	25	9	3	305	266	571	89	108	0.4	0.1	12.2	10.6	22.8	3.6	4.3	6
2024	Collingwood	10	20	7	4	220	194	414	62	79	0.4	0.2	11.0	9.7	20.7	3.1	4.0	2
2025	Collingwood	10	22	3	5	234	252	486	89	86	0.1	0.2	10.6	11.5	22.1	4.0	3.9	2
2026	Collingwood	10	15	5	6	153	201	354	71	35	0.3	0.4	10.2	13.4	23.6	4.7	2.3	0
Career			440	209	134	5545	5596	11141	1743	2022	0.5	0.3	12.6	12.7	25.3	4.0	4.6	225

== Honours and achievements ==
Team

- 2× AFL premiership player (Collingwood): 2010, 2023
- 2× AFL minor premiership/McClelland Trophy (Collingwood): 2010, 2011
- AFL minor premiership (Collingwood): 2023
- NAB Cup (Collingwood): 2011

Individual

- Norm Smith Medal: 2010 replay
- Collingwood captain: 2014–2022
- AFLCA champion player of the year: 2013
- Collingwood games record holder
- 6× All-Australian team: 2010, 2011, 2012, 2013, 2014, 2019
- 5× Copeland Trophy: 2011, 2013, 2014, 2015, 2016
- 2× AFLPA best captain: 2020, 2022
- AFLCA best young player: 2007
- 4× Anzac Medal: 2010, 2011, 2019, 2026
- AFL Rising Star nominee: 2007
