= James Clement =

Australian rules footballer, born 1976

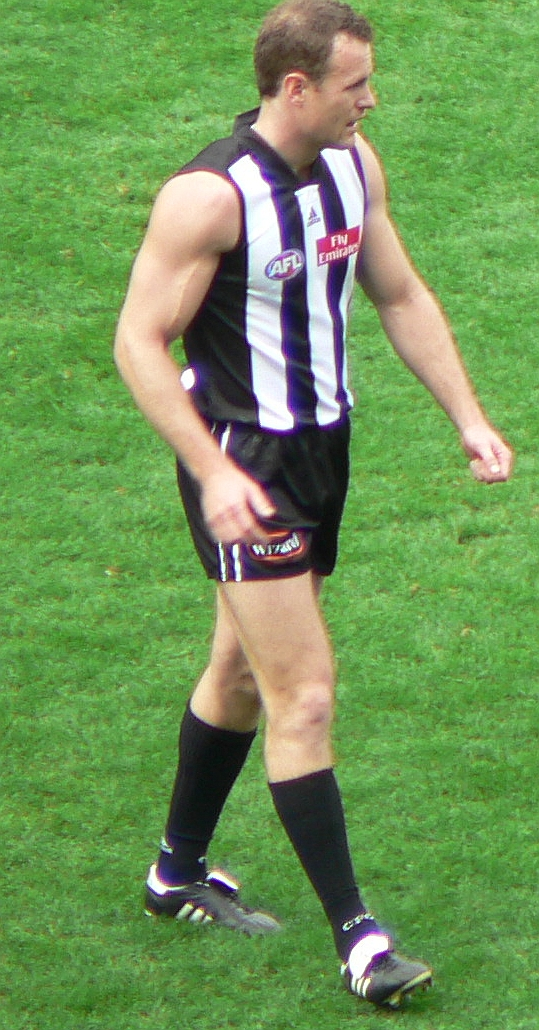
- Playing for Collingwood during the 2006 AFL Season

Personal information
- Born: 4 September 1976 (age 50); Western Australia
- Original team: South Fremantle (WAFL)/Scotch College (PSA)
- Debut: Round 11, 16 June 1996, Fremantle vs. Essendon, at Melbourne Cricket Ground

Playing career^{1}
Years	Club	Games (Goals)
1996–2000	Fremantle	84 (38)
2001–2007	Collingwood	146 (13)
Total		230 (51)
- ^{1} Playing statistics correct to the end of 2007.

Career highlights
- Collingwood best and fairest 2004, 2005; 2nd Collingwood best and fairest 2006; 3rd Collingwood best and fairest 2002; All-Australian 2004, 2005; International Rules Series 2002; 2007 Jason McCartney Medal

James Clement (born 4 September 1976) is a former professional Australian rules footballer for Collingwood and Fremantle in the Australian Football League (AFL). He was selected in the All-Australian Team on two occasions, represented Australia in the International Rules Series and was vice-captain of Collingwood.

== Fremantle career ==
From South Fremantle, the Fremantle Dockers picked Clement up as a zone selection in the 1995 National Draft. His major role as a junior was as a half-back/winger, but he was used as a taller type defender throughout his AFL career. A regular starter since making his debut in 1996, his form slipped at senior level at the start of 1998, being omitted after the first match, but came back into the side as a tall forward option and surprised many, kicking 5 goals in consecutive games. He ended up kicking 27 goals for the season. He moved back to defence in 1999, he showed he was capable of playing as a utility. Only playing 8 games in 2000 and what seemed an unhappy relationship with coach Damian Drum, Clement was then traded to Collingwood.

== Collingwood career ==
Clement thrived at Collingwood playing 20 games during 2001, but it was in 2002 that the Pies saw a champion player. During this time, he bulked up substantially. Unlucky not to gain his first All-Australian selection, but played in the International Rules Series in Ireland at the end of the season. His strength as a defender, football brain and leadership qualities were shown. He helped the Pies through to a Grand Final and played all 25 games, including the last day in September. 2003 saw Clement miss several games mid-season with a hamstring injury, but he regained form at finals time and the vice-captain saw another Grand Final.

He had much more decorated seasons in 2004 and 2005, including All-Australian honours and the Copeland Trophy in each of the seasons, as the Pies finished in the bottom 4 in both seasons. He led the side for several matches in 2005 when Nathan Buckley and Anthony Rocca were missing from the team due to injury. In 2006, Clement was surprisingly not named in the All-Australian team, and finished equal second in the Copeland Trophy. In 2007, it was considered possible that Clement would take over the captaincy of the Collingwood side from Nathan Buckley, however he announced his surprise retirement at the end of the 2007 season. Later it was revealed he retired to support his wife Jeanne, who has autoimmune kidney failure.

== Statistics ==
Legend
G	Goals	K	Kicks	D	Disposals	T	Tackles
B	Behinds	H	Handballs	M	Marks

Season	Team	No.	Games	Totals							Averages (per game)						
Season	Team	No.	Games	G	B	K	H	D	M	T	G	B	K	H	D	M	T
1996	Fremantle	31	12	1	0	93	57	150	46	19	0.1	0.0	7.8	4.8	12.5	3.8	1.6
1997	Fremantle	31	21	4	5	160	84	244	79	26	0.2	0.2	7.6	4.0	11.6	3.8	1.2
1998	Fremantle	31	21	27	13	128	48	176	68	23	1.3	0.6	6.1	2.3	8.4	3.2	1.1
1999	Fremantle	31	22	5	3	231	71	302	105	29	0.2	0.1	10.5	3.2	13.7	4.8	1.3
2000	Fremantle	31	8	1	0	77	19	96	34	13	0.1	0.0	9.6	2.4	12.0	4.3	1.6
2001	Collingwood	8	20	7	8	216	79	295	115	32	0.4	0.4	10.8	4.0	14.8	5.8	1.6
2002	Collingwood	8	25	1	1	268	88	356	91	53	0.0	0.0	10.7	3.5	14.2	3.6	2.1
2003	Collingwood	8	21	0	1	179	81	260	78	28	0.0	0.0	8.5	3.9	12.4	3.7	1.3
2004	Collingwood	8	22	0	0	251	77	328	117	33	0.0	0.0	11.4	3.5	14.9	5.3	1.5
2005	Collingwood	8	22	1	3	276	102	378	105	57	0.0	0.1	12.5	4.6	17.2	4.8	2.6
2006	Collingwood	8	23	2	0	300	88	388	146	42	0.1	0.0	13.0	3.8	16.9	6.3	1.8
2007	Collingwood	8	13	2	0	172	41	213	83	33	0.2	0.0	13.2	3.2	16.4	6.4	2.5
Career			230	51	34	2351	835	3186	1067	388	0.2	0.1	10.2	3.6	13.9	4.6	1.7

== Post Football Career ==
James Clement is currently the Chief Executive Officer of Vysarn Limited.
