= Copeland Trophy =

Award in the Collingwood Football Club

The E.W. Copeland Trophy is an Australian rules football award given by the Collingwood Football Club to the player adjudged best and fairest for Collingwood during the year.

The Copeland Shield, as it was formerly known, was donated by Ern Copeland, the secretary who came to the club in 1895 and led the club through the 1890s depression, saving it from financial ruin. He remained an employee of Collingwood for 29 years, finally retiring in 1924. The trophy was unveiled in 1932, with the best and fairest award winners from the previous five years engraved on the trophy.

Along with the Copeland Trophy, the R.T. Rush Trophy is awarded to the second best and fairest player, the J.J. Joyce Trophy is awarded to the third placed player, the Jock McHale Trophy to the fourth placed player, and the Jack Regan Trophy to the fifth placed player.

The voting system as of the 2017 AFL season, consists of five coaches awarding 22 votes per match, with no specific distribution required. If two players are tied at the end of the season, the player with the highest average votes-per-game is awarded the winner. If they are still tied, the player with the highest number of 'high value' votes is awarded the winner.

== Recipients ==
^	Denotes current Collingwood player
+	Player won Brownlow Medal in same season

Season	Recipient(s)	Ref.
1927	Syd Coventry+	
1928	Harry Collier	
1929	Albert Collier+	
1930	Harry Collier+ (2)	
1931	Harold Rumney	
1932	Syd Coventry (2)	
1933	Gordon Coventry	
1934	Albert Collier (2)	
1935	Albert Collier (3)	
1936	Jack Regan	
1937	Des Fothergill	
1938	Des Fothergill (2)	
1939	Marcus Whelan+	
1940	Des Fothergill+ (3)	
1941	Jack Murphy	
1942	Alby Pannam	
1943	—N/a	^{[a]}
1944	—N/a	^{[a]}
1945	—N/a	^{[a]}
1946	Phonse Kyne	
1947	Phonse Kyne (2)	
1948	Phonse Kyne (3)	
1949	Bob Rose	
1950	Charlie Utting	
1951	Bob Rose (2)	
1952	Bob Rose (3)	
1953	Bob Rose (4)	
1954	Neil Mann	
1955	Des Healey	
1956	Bill Twomey	
1957	Murray Weideman	
1958	Thorold Merrett	
1959	Thorold Merrett (2)	
1960	Ray Gabelich	
1961	Murray Weideman (2)	
1962	Murray Weideman (3)	
1963	Des Tuddenham	
1964	Ian Graham	
1965	Trevor Steer	
1966	Terry Waters	
1967	Len Thompson	
1968	Len Thompson (2)	
1969	Barry Price	
1970	Peter McKenna	
1971	Wayne Richardson	
1972	Len Thompson+ (3)	
1973	Len Thompson (4)	
1974	Wayne Richardson (2)	
1975	Phil Carman	
1976	Robert Hyde	
1977	Len Thompson (5)	
1978	Ray Shaw	
1979	Peter Moore+	
1980	Peter Moore (2)	
1981	Mark Williams	
1982	Peter Daicos	
1983	Billy Picken	
1984	Tony Shaw	
1985	Mark Williams (2)	
1986	Wes Fellowes	
1987	Darren Millane	
1988	Peter Daicos (2)	
1989	Gavin Brown	
1990	Tony Shaw (2)	
1991	Tony Francis	
1992	Mick McGuane	
1993	Mick McGuane (2)	
1994	Gavin Brown (2)	
1994	Nathan Buckley	
1995	Saverio Rocca	
1996	Nathan Buckley (2)	
1997	Gavin Brown (3)	
1998	Nathan Buckley (3)	
1999	Nathan Buckley (4)	
2000	Nathan Buckley (5)	
2001	Paul Licuria	
2002	Paul Licuria (2)	
2003	Nathan Buckley+ (6)	
2004	James Clement	
2005	James Clement (2)	
2006	Alan Didak	
2007	Travis Cloke	
2008	Dane Swan	
2009	Dane Swan (2)	
2010	Dane Swan (3)	
2011	Scott Pendlebury	
2012	Dayne Beams	
2013	Scott Pendlebury (2)	
2014	Scott Pendlebury (3)	
2015	Scott Pendlebury (4)	
2016	Scott Pendlebury (5)	
2017	Steele Sidebottom	
2018	Steele Sidebottom (2)	
2018	Brodie Grundy	
2019	Brodie Grundy (2)	
2020	Taylor Adams	
2021	Jack Crisp^	
2022	Jack Crisp^ (2)	
2023	Josh Daicos^	
2024	Nick Daicos^	
2025	Darcy Cameron^	
2026	Nick Daicos^ (2)	

== Multiple winners ==
^	Denotes current Collingwood player

Player	Medals	Seasons
Nathan Buckley	6	1994, 1996, 1998, 1999, 2000, 2003
Scott Pendlebury	5	2011, 2013, 2014, 2015, 2016
Len Thompson	5	1967, 1968, 1972, 1973, 1977
Bob Rose	4	1949, 1951, 1952, 1953
Gavin Brown	3	1989, 1994, 1997
Albert Collier	3	1929, 1934, 1935
Des Fothergill	3	1937, 1938, 1940
Phonse Kyne	3	1946, 1947, 1948
Dane Swan	3	2008, 2009, 2010
Murray Weideman	3	1957, 1961, 1962
James Clement	2	2004, 2005
Harry Collier	2	1928, 1930
Syd Coventry	2	1927, 1932
Jack Crisp^	2	2021, 2022
Nick Daicos^	2	2024, 2026
Peter Daicos	2	1982, 1988
Brodie Grundy	2	2018, 2019
Paul Licuria	2	2001, 2002
Mick McGuane	2	1992, 1993
Thorold Merrett	2	1958, 1959
Peter Moore	2	1979, 1980
Wayne Richardson	2	1971, 1974
Steele Sidebottom	2	2017, 2018
Tony Shaw	2	1984, 1990
Mark Williams	2	1981, 1985

== Notes ==
- ^{a} The Copeland Trophy was not awarded in the 1942, 1943, and 1944 VFL seasons because of World War II.
