= Max Richardson =

Australian rules footballer

Personal information
- Born: 24 December 1948 (age 77)
- Original team: South Fremantle (WANFL)
- Debut: Round 5, 1969, Collingwood vs. St Kilda, at Moorabbin Oval
- Height: 183 cm (6 ft 0 in)
- Weight: 87 kg (192 lb)

Playing career^{1}
Years	Club	Games (Goals)
1967–1968	South Fremantle	40 (39)
1969–1978	Collingwood	211 (158)
1979–1980	Fitzroy	30 (41)
Total		281 (238)
- ^{1} Playing statistics correct to the end of 1980.

Career highlights
- Runner-up Copeland Trophy; Collingwood captain 1977

Max Richardson (born 24 December 1948) is a former Australian rules footballer who played for Collingwood Football Club during the 1970s before finishing his career at Fitzroy Football Club.

The younger brother of Wayne, Collingwood recruited Richardson from Western Australian Football League club South Fremantle and went on to captain the club in 1977. He usually played as a ruck rover or on the half back line.
