= Bob Rose (footballer) =

Australian rules footballer (1928–2003)

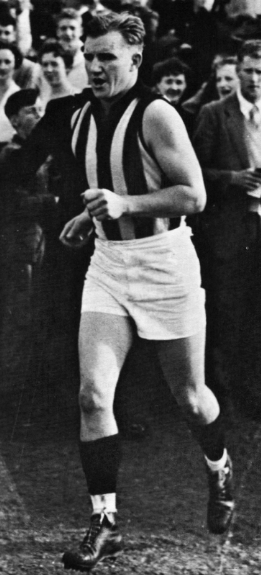

Personal information
- Full name: Robert Arthur Rose
- Born: 7 August 1928; Nyah West, Victoria
- Died: 7 July 2003 (aged 74); Cabrini Hospital, Malvern, Victoria
- Original team: Nyah West
- Height: 178 cm (5 ft 10 in)
- Weight: 74 kg (163 lb)

Playing career^{1}
| Years | Club | Games (Goals) |
| 1946–1955 | Collingwood | 152 (214) |
| 1956–1962 | Wangaratta Rovers | 126 (294) |
| Total | | 278 (508) |

Coaching career
| Years | Club | Games (W–L–D) |
| 1964–1971 | Collingwood | 168 (111–55–2) |
| 1972–1975 | Footscray | 89 (42–45–2) |
| 1985–1986 | Collingwood | 25 (10–15–0) |
| Total | | 282 (163–115–4) |
- ^{1} Playing statistics correct to the end of 1955.

Career highlights
- Nyah West Premiership 1945; Nyah West Best & Fairest 1945; Mid Murray Football League Best & Fairest 1945; Collingwood best and fairest 1949, 1951-52-53; Runner-up Brownlow Medal 1953; Collingwood leading goalkicker 1953; All-Australian 1953; Sports Life Team of the Year 1951-52-53-54; Wangaratta Rovers Premiership Captain/Coach 1958, 1960; Ovens & Murray Morris Medal 1958, 1960; Ovens & Murray Leading Goalkicker 1960 (57); Wangaratta Rovers Best & Fairest 1956,57,59,1960; Collingwood Team of the Century (centre) 1997; AFLPA Award for Most Courageous Player named in his honour; Australian Football Hall of Fame inductee, 1996; Ovens & Murray Hall of Fame 2005; Wangaratta Rovers Hall of Fame 2001

Robert Arthur Rose (7 August 1928 – 7 July 2003) was an Australian rules footballer and coach in the Victorian Football League (VFL). He is widely regarded as one of the greatest players ever to play for Collingwood. With 282 games coached, Rose is fourth on the all-time AFL/VFL list of most games coached without a premiership, behind Rodney Eade (377), Ross Lyon (354) and John Northey (315).

== Playing career ==
Recruited from country club Nyah West, Rose debuted in 1946. He was a genuine all-round sportsman, who was looking down the path of a professional boxing career, but decided to play the game of football. Rose was courageous in the midfield, and was very skilful on both sides. His honours included four best and fairest awards, leading goalkicker in a premiership season, and All-Australian representative. However, Rose never won the Brownlow Medal, despite being up in the mix on several occasions, his highest finish a runner-up placing in 1953. Rose also, as an icon of the club, never was given the role as captain due to the strong leaders playing for the Pies.

Rose played in 3 grand finals (1952, 1953 and 1955) for one premiership in 1953. Injuries had got the better of him by the latter stages of his league career, and Rose retired in 1955 after 152 games and 214 goals, with the losing 1955 grand final being his last match.

Rose was inducted into the Australian Football Hall of Fame in 1996. He was selected as the centre in Collingwood's Team of the Century, and the AFL Players Association's annual award for Most Courageous Player, struck in 1991, is named in Rose's honour.

== Coaching career ==
=== Wangaratta Rovers (1956–1962) ===
In 1956, Rose was appointed captain-coach of Wangaratta Rovers in the Ovens & Murray Football League; he had moved to Wangaratta to open a sporting goods store. Rose led the Rovers to premierships in 1958 and 1960, finishing runners-up in 1959 and 1962. Rose was the league's leading goalkicker in 1960, and the Morris Medal winner in 1958 and 1960.

=== Return to Collingwood (1964–1971) ===
Rose returned to the VFL in a coaching capacity, taking over from Phonse Kyne in 1964 as Collingwood senior coach. He led the side to the grand final in 1964, 1966 and 1970, losing each time by a handful of points. He continued to coach Collingwood until 1971 (apart from one game in 1967 when Neil Mann, who later became his successor as senior coach, took the reins).

=== Switch to Footscray (1972–1975) ===
Rose went to coach the Footscray Football Club as senior coach between 1972 and 1975.

=== A Collingwood homecoming (1985–1986) ===
Rose returned for a second and final stint as senior coach of Collingwood from 1985 to 1986, where he replaced John Cahill at the end of the 1984 season. In the 1985 season, Rose guided Collingwood to finish seventh on the ladder, missing out on the finals with ten wins and twelve losses. Rose would hold the reins for a brief period before Collingwood's severe financial crisis and poor form on the field led to his resignation in favour of assistant coach Leigh Matthews, who replaced Rose as Collingwood senior coach after round 3 of the 1986 season.

== Family ==
He was the father of Robert Rose, a cricketer and footballer; and Peter Rose, a poet and novelist.

== Death ==
Rose continued to remain around the Collingwood Football Club behind the scenes right up until his death. He died at Cabrini Hospital after a short battle with cancer on 7 July 2003. A small group of Collingwood players, including Nathan Buckley, paid a visit to Rose in the final week before his death. Rhyce Shaw was the man who wore Rose's no.22 during the time of illness, and would occasionally have initialed B.R above the number in dedication to Bob.

== Legacy ==
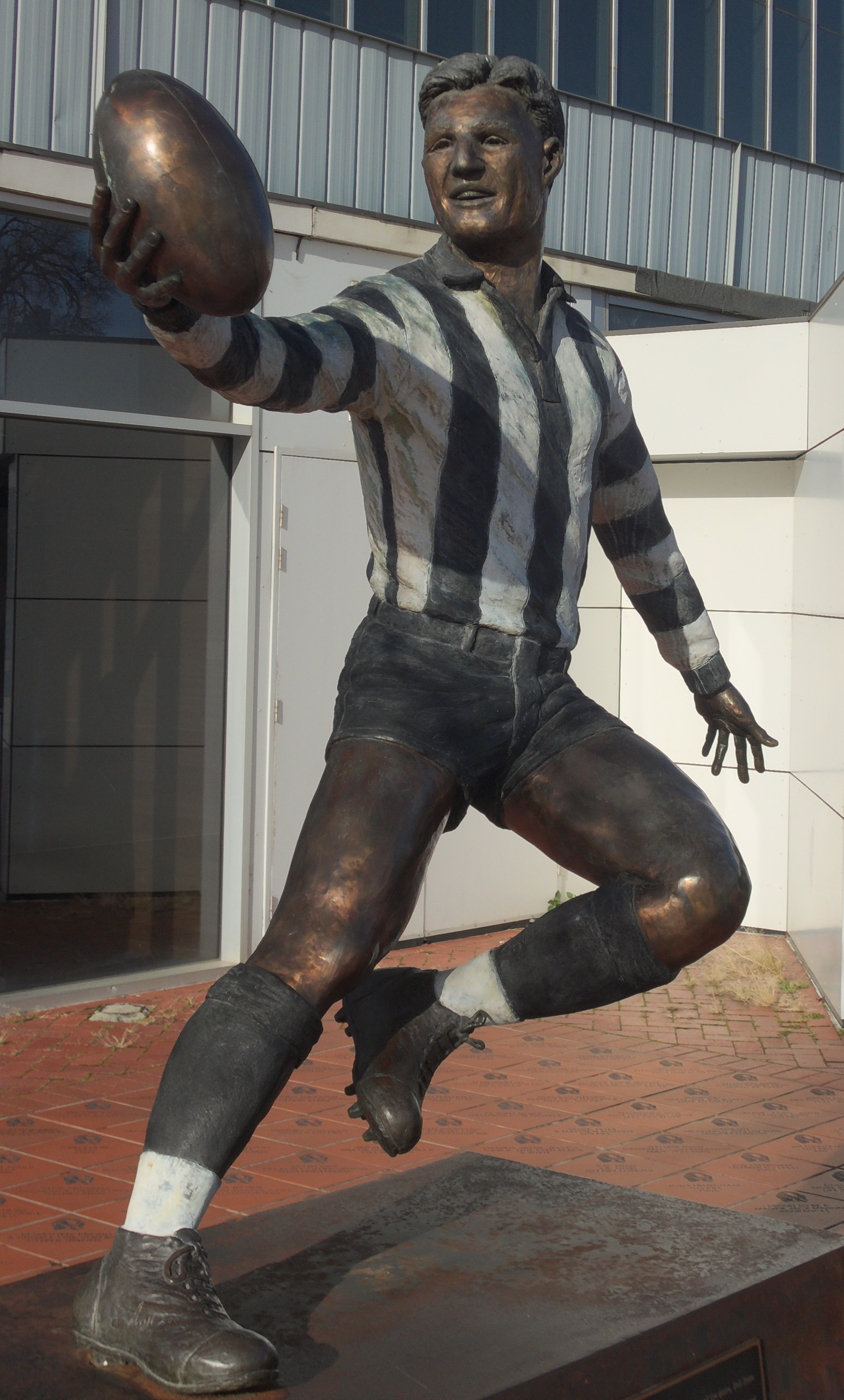
Statue of Bob Rose by Mitch Mitchell (2006)

In 2006, a memorial statue of Rose was unveiled outside the main entrance of the Melbourne Sports and Entertainment Centre, the home of the Collingwood Football Club. Present at the unveiling was the widow of Rose, Elsie Rose, and son Peter Rose, an accomplished poet and novelist.

In 2009, The Australian nominated Rose as one of the 25 greatest footballers never to win a Brownlow Medal.
