= Bill Cahill (Australian footballer) =

Australian rules footballer (1910–1966)

Personal information
- Full name: Keyran William John Cahill
- Born: 5 December 1910; Hobart, Tasmania
- Died: 7 March 1966 (aged 55); Launceston, Tasmania
- Original team: Launceston
- Height: 183 cm (6 ft 0 in)
- Weight: 85 kg (187 lb)
- Position: Half back

Playing career^{1}
Years	Club	Games (Goals)
1937–1938	Essendon	15 (0)
- ^{1} Playing statistics correct to the end of 1938.

Keyran William John Cahill (5 December 1910 – 7 March 1966) was a sportsman who played Australian rules football for Essendon in the Victorian Football League (VFL) during the 1930s and represented Tasmania at first-class cricket.

== Family ==
The son of Keyran Nelson Cahill (1876-1924), and Emma Amelia Cahill (1877-1953), née Cornish, later Mrs. Linden Jones, Keyran William John Cahill was born at Hobart, Tasmania on 5 December 1910.

He married Floris Ada Illingworth (1911-1995), at Windermere, Tasmania on 19 October 1939.

== Cricket ==
He made four first-class appearances with Tasmania in the 1931–32 season. One of those was against the touring South African team and he took the only wicket of his career when he dismissed all-rounder Quintin McMillan.

"An ambidextrous bowler", "equally proficient with either arm", he was still playing top-level competition cricket in the 1953/54 season, at the age of 43.

== Football ==
=== Launceston (NTFA) ===
Cahill, a half back, won the Tasman Shields Trophy while at Northern Tasmanian Football Association club Launceston twice: in 1933 and 1936.

=== Essendon (VFL) ===
Having finally fulfilled his "residential qualification", Cahill was cleared from Tasmania to Essendon on 23 June 1937.

He made his debut against Carlton, at Windy Hill, on 26 June 1937, and The Argus reported that "The form of Cahill, the Tasmanian, was most pleasing. He showed ability in defence".

Selected at centre half-back against Footscray, at Windy Hill, on 10 July 1937, he seriously injured his shoulder during the match; however, because the 19th man, Leo Maynes, had already replaced the concussed George Coward, there was no replacement for Cahill, and he had to remain on the field.

"CAHILL'S COURAGE
Apart from his football ability, Bill Cahill, the Tasmanian centre half-back, who made his first appearance with Essendon two weeks ago, also has an unlimited supply of courage. In the first quarter against Footscray he received a solid blow to the shoulder and unable to raise his left arm, he had to be shifted to a back pocket. Even then he could be of little assistance, but because the 19th man had been called upon he stuck out to the bitter end. Examination yesterday showed he had a small bone broken in his shoulder." – The Herald, 14 July 1937.

The shoulder injury meant that he was unable to play in the last six games of the 1937 season; yet, although he had only been able to play in three matches, The Argus selected Cahill at centre half-back in its team of 1937's first-year players.

		Best First-Year Players (1937)	
Backs	Bernie Treweek (Fitzroy)	Reg Henderson (Richmond)	Lawrence Morgan (Fitzroy)
H/Backs	Gordon Waters (Hawthorn)	Bill Cahill (Essendon)	Eddie Morcom (North Melbourne)
Centre Line	Ted Buckley (Melbourne)	George Bates (Richmond)	Jack Kelly (St Kilda)
H/Forwards	Col Williamson (St Kilda)	Ray Watts (Essendon)	Don Dilks (Footscray)
Forwards	Lou Sleeth (Richmond)	Sel Murray (North Melbourne)	Charlie Pierce (Hawthorn)
Rucks/Rover	Reg Garvin (St Kilda)	Sandy Patterson (South Melbourne)	Des Fothergill (Collingwood)
Second Ruck	Lawrence Morgan	Col Williamson	Lou Sleeth

=== Launceston (NTFA) ===
He returned to Launceston in 1939 where he was appointed captain-coach. Overall, he played for Launceston in seven premiership teams in eight seasons.

=== Old Launcestonians (TAFL) ===
In 1946, he was appointed coach of Old Launcestonians Football Club in the (Launceston-based) Tasmanian Amateur Football League.

== Military service ==
He served in the RAAF during the Second World War.

== See also ==
- List of Tasmanian representative cricketers
