= Stratford-on-Avon Racecourse =

Horse racing venue in England

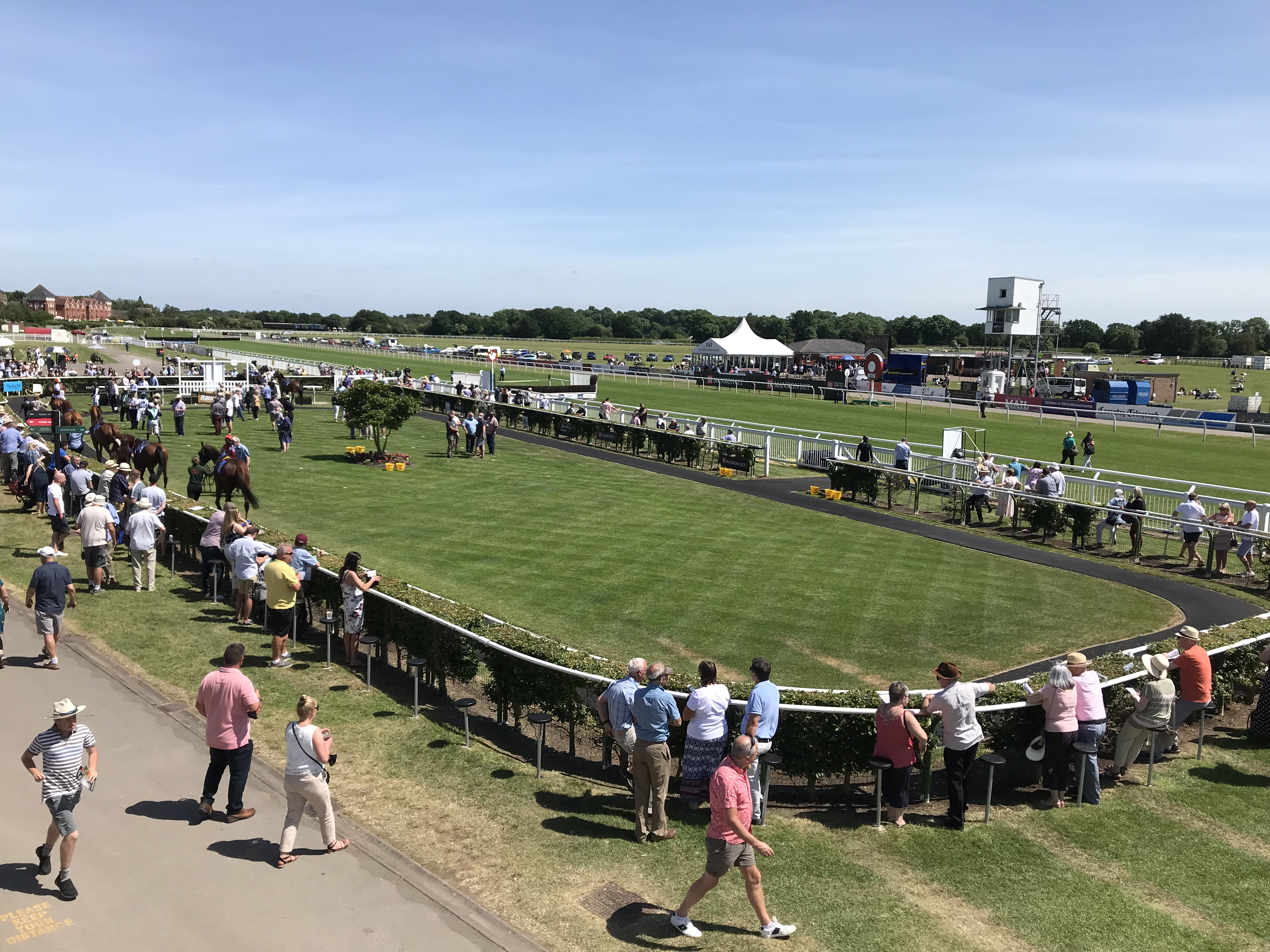
- The parade ring
- Interactive map of Stratford-on-Avon Racecourse
- Location: Stratford-on-Avon, Warwickshire
- Coordinates: 52.181°N 1.723°W
- Owned by: Stratford-on-Avon Racecourse Company Ltd.
- Date opened: 1755
- Screened on: Racing TV
- Course type: National Hunt

Stratford-on-Avon Racecourse (often known as simply Stratford Racecourse) is a thoroughbred horse racing venue located in Stratford-on-Avon, Warwickshire, England.

== History ==
Racing first took place near Stratford on Avon in July 1718, but the racecourse proper did not open until September 1755. The first race was won by Forrester. Racing continued through the 1700s and 1800s, including a horse named Lottery winning at Stratford in 1839 prior to success in the Grand National at Aintree Racecourse. In 1904, races were run under the title of "Stratford and Warwickshire Hunt Races" and continued to be known until racing ceased between 1914 and 1919 for WWI. On 31 January 1922, the Stratford Race Company was formed and continues to run the racecourse. In 1955, a new grandstand was opened and 10 years later a restaurant added.

A feature race of the Stratford season is the Stratford Foxhunters Chase and is traditionally seen as the third jewel in the Hunter Chase crown alongside the races at Cheltenham and Aintree.

== Course and facilities ==
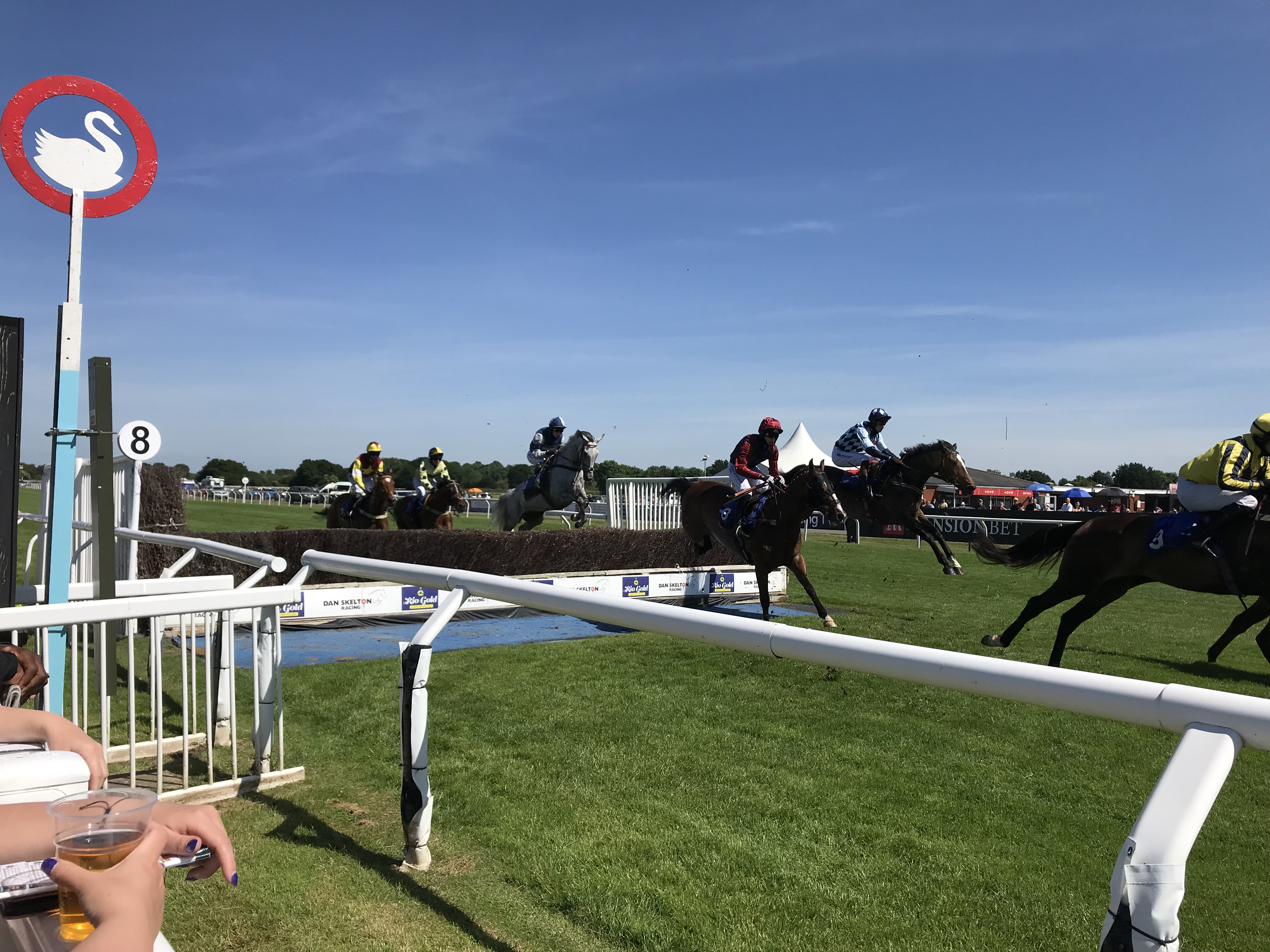
Horses jumping the water

Stratford is a left handed course with eight fences per circuit and is notable for its speed. The course is triangular in shape with sharp bends. In 2008, a water jump was added on the home straight but is not jumped on the final circuit.

Stratford Racecourse features a touring park within its grounds with around 100 pitches.
