= Credit Call =

British-bred Thoroughbred racehorse

Credit Call was an English racehorse who won 37 National Hunt steeplechases up to 1976. He was a gelding, originally owned by Chris Collins and trained by [William] Arthur Stephenson. Collins won 27 races before selling the horse to Ursula "Urkie" Newton. Collins rode most wins himself as an amateur jockey, but in the 1971 Horse and Hound Cup he was injured and Graham Macmillan rode. Newton's son Joey rode him to four wins in eight starts in 1975. In 1976 Urkie took over as trainer, and Joey had six more wins. The Credit Call Cup is awarded for the Novices' Hunters' Chase at Stratford, commemorating Credit Call's four victories in the Horse and Hound Cup.

Results of Credit Call
Race	Location	Wins	Years	Notes
Horse and Hound Cup	Stratford	4	1971, 1972, 1973, 1975	
Fox Hunters' Chase	Aintree	3	1972, 1975, 1976	
Foxhunter Chase	Cheltenham	1	1972	Second in 1976
