= Ray Watts (footballer) =

Australian rules footballer

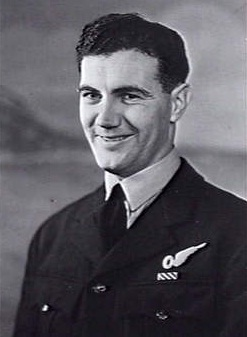

Personal information
- Full name: Raymond Carson Watts
- Born: 13 August 1917; Launceston
- Died: 17 January 2008 (aged 90); Melbourne
- Original team: Churinga
- Height: 188 cm (6 ft 2 in)
- Weight: 86 kg (190 lb)
- Position: Key forward

Playing career^{1}
Years	Club	Games (Goals)
1937–1941	Essendon	59 (149)
- ^{1} Playing statistics correct to the end of 1941.

Raymond Carson Watts DFC (13 August 1917 – 17 January 2008) was an Australian rules footballer who played with Essendon in the Victorian Football League (VFL).

== Family ==
The son of Walter Harold Watts (1887–1966), and Cilvia/Sylvia Angela Bell Watts (1893–1967), née Ferguson, Raymond Carson Watts was born at Launceston, Tasmania on 13 August 1917.

He married Myrtle Jessie Louise Gregory (1919–2005), the daughter of Harry "Speed" Gregory on 21 June 1941.

== Football ==
A forward, Watts grew up in Launceston and played his early football with Churinga Football Club in the Tasmanian Amateur Football League. He was the league's best and fairest player in 1936.

Watts made his VFL debut in the 11th round of the 1937 VFL season against North Melbourne and kicked three goals. He kicked 60 goals for Essendon in 1938, a total bettered by only one teammate, Tom Reynolds. This included a career best seven goals in a win over St Kilda, which he equaled twice more in his career. He was Essendon's third leading goal-kicker in 1939 and 1940.

He was a member of the Essendon seconds premiership team in 1941, but made only two appearances in the seniors that year, as he had enlisted with the Royal Australian Air Force.

He returned to Essendon in 1945 and played briefly in the seconds before transferring to Preston.

In 1950, playing for the Repatriation team, against the State Electricity Commission team in the Saturday Morning League, he kicked a SML-record-breaking 17.4 (106) of his team's total of 18.5 (113).

== 1937 Best First-Year Players ==
In September 1937, The Argus selected Watts in its team of 1937's first-year players.

		Best First-Year Players (1937)	
Backs	Bernie Treweek (Fitzroy)	Reg Henderson (Richmond)	Lawrence Morgan (Fitzroy)
H/Backs	Gordon Waters (Hawthorn)	Bill Cahill (Essendon)	Eddie Morcom (North Melbourne)
Centre Line	Ted Buckley (Melbourne)	George Bates (Richmond)	Jack Kelly (St Kilda)
H/Forwards	Col Williamson (St Kilda)	Ray Watts (Essendon)	Don Dilks (Footscray)
Forwards	Lou Sleeth (Richmond)	Sel Murray (North Melbourne)	Charlie Pierce (Hawthorn)
Rucks/Rover	Reg Garvin (St Kilda)	Sandy Patterson (South Melbourne)	Des Fothergill (Collingwood)
Second Ruck	Lawrence Morgan	Col Williamson	Lou Sleeth

== Military service ==
During the war he served as a warrant officer and in 1943 was awarded a Distinguished Flying Cross, along with his pilot Arthur Simpson (408881), for their efforts in a bombing operation over Germany. They were flying over Hanover on a Lancaster bomber when the airscrew of a German night fighter tore a hole under the plane's nose, which resulted in the plane falling 3000 feet. Despite this, they were able to recover and still achieve their objectives in dropping the bombs at their target.

P[ilot]-Officer Arthur Bruce Simpson and WO Raymond Carson Watts, RAAF, were pilot and navigator respectively of an aircraft detailed to attack Hanover one night in October, 1943. When approaching the target the aircraft was struck by what is believed to have been an enemy fighter which tore away the nose of the bomb aimer's compartment. Two engines also were damaged. By a superb effort P-Officer Simpson retained control, and afterwards succeeded in evading two fighters which flew to the attack. Despite loss of essential equipment, WO Watts guided his pilot to base, where a safe landing was effected. The two men suffered intense cold from the wind, which blew through the torn structure, and their hands were frostbitten. For skill, courage, and fortitude, they were awarded the Distinguished Flying Cross.
The Mercury, 2 March 1944.

=== Prisoner of war ===
On 31 May 1944 he was shot down by enemy fire and managed to hide in a Belgian pine forest for six weeks until he was captured. He spent more than a year as a German prisoner of war at Stalag Luft III.

== Death ==
He died in Melbourne on 17 January 2008.

== See also ==
- List of solved missing person cases
