= Ted Buckley =

Australian rules footballer, born 1912

Personal information
- Full name: Edmund Thomas Buckley
- Born: 23 June 1912; Lauriston, Victoria
- Died: 4 February 1984 (aged 71); Prahran, Victoria
- Original team: Kyneton
- Height: 177 cm (5 ft 10 in)
- Weight: 72 kg (159 lb)
- Position: wing

Playing career^{1}
| Years | Club | Games (Goals) |
| 1937–39 | Melbourne | 38 (3) |
- ^{1} Playing statistics correct to the end of 1939.

Edmund Thomas "Ted" Buckley (23 June 1912 – 4 February 1984) was an Australian rules footballer who played with Melbourne in the Victorian Football League (VFL).

== Family ==
The son of Patrick Joseph Buckley (1857-1917), Catherine Amelia Buckley (1874-1944), née Welch, Edmund Thomas Buckley was born at Lauriston, Victoria on 23 June 1912.

He married Mabel Elizabeth Spears on 6 July 1940.

== Football ==
=== Kyneton (BFL) ===
He played for five seasons with the Kyneton Football Club in the Bendigo Football League.

=== Melbourne (VFL) ===
He made his debut for Melbourne against Collingwood, at the MCG, on 22 May 1937.

=== 1937 Best First-Year Players ===
In September 1937, The Argus selected Buckley in its team of 1937's first-year players.

| | | Best First-Year Players (1937) | |
|---|---|---|---|
| Backs | Bernie Treweek (Fitzroy) | Reg Henderson (Richmond) | Lawrence Morgan (Fitzroy) |
| H/Backs | Gordon Waters (Hawthorn) | Bill Cahill (Essendon) | Eddie Morcom (North Melbourne) |
| Centre Line | Ted Buckley (Melbourne) | George Bates (Richmond) | Jack Kelly (St Kilda) |
| H/Forwards | Col Williamson (St Kilda) | Ray Watts (Essendon) | Don Dilks (Footscray) |
| Forwards | Lou Sleeth (Richmond) | Sel Murray (North Melbourne) | Charlie Pierce (Hawthorn) |
| Rucks/Rover | Reg Garvin (St Kilda) | Sandy Patterson (South Melbourne) | Des Fothergill (Collingwood) |
| Second Ruck | Lawrence Morgan | Col Williamson | Lou Sleeth |

=== Brighton (VFA) ===
On 30 April 1941, he was cleared from Melbourne to the Brighton Football Club.

== Death ==
He died at the Alfred Hospital, in Prahran, Victoria, on 4 February 1984.
