= Bert Chandler (Australian footballer) =

Australian rules footballer

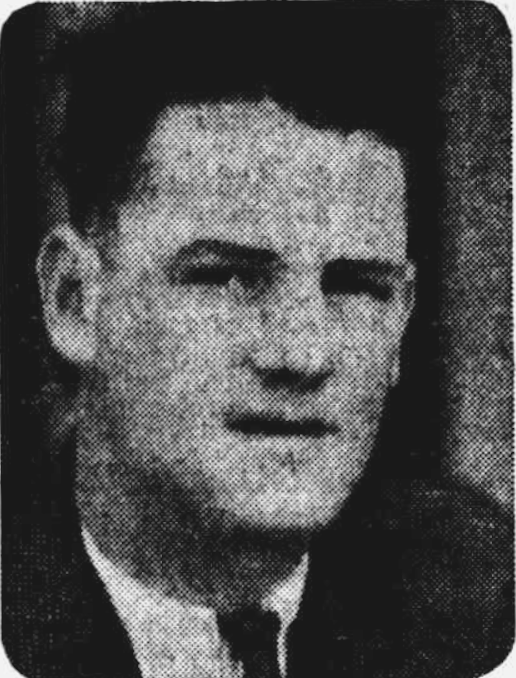

Personal information
- Full name: Bert Reade Chandler
- Born: 7 October 1913
- Died: 15 November 1961 (aged 48)
- Original team: South Camberwell
- Height: 179 cm (5 ft 10 in)
- Weight: 83 kg (183 lb)
- Position: Key position

Playing career^{1}
Years	Club	Games (Goals)
1931; 1933–1935	Hawthorn	48 (24)
1937	Melbourne	11 (0)
Total		59 (24)

Representative team honours^{2}
Years	Team	Games (Goals)
1938–1939	Western Australia	4 (?)
- ^{1} Playing statistics correct to the end of 1937.^{2} Representative statistics correct as of 1939.

Bert Reade Chandler (7 October 1913 – 15 November 1961) was an Australian rules footballer who played for Hawthorn and Melbourne in the Victorian Football League (VFL) during the 1930s.

Chandler, from South Camberwell, started out at Hawthorn in 1931 but played just three games and did not make any VFL appearances in 1932. He kicked 20 goals in 1933, seven of those goals in a loss against Melbourne and he did not experience a win until his 14th VFL game late in the year. A key position player, he moved to the West Australian National Football League (WANFL) in 1936 and captain-coached Swan Districts for the season. He then returned to Victoria and spent the 1937 VFL season at Melbourne, part of a player swap, Hawthorn got Ken Feltscheer and Gordon Waters in return. Bert last game in Victoria was the 1937 Preliminary Final loss.

He continued his WANFL career at South Fremantle and was captain-coach in 1938 and 1939. Playing as a full-forward, he kicked 120 goals in 1938 to top the club's goal-kicking but still missed out on the league award as West Perth's Ted Tyson kicked 126 goals. Chandler made two interstate appearances with Western Australia as a full-forward in 1938 and a further two as full-back the following year.
