= Lou Sleeth =

Australian rules footballer (1916–1990)

Personal information
- Full name: Louis David Sleeth
- Born: 26 February 1916; Lilydale, Victoria
- Died: 29 November 1990 (aged 74)
- Original team: Box Hill
- Height: 173 cm (5 ft 8 in)
- Weight: 73 kg (161 lb)
- Position: half-forward flank

Playing career^{1}
Years	Club	Games (Goals)
1937–38	Richmond	20 (22)
- ^{1} Playing statistics correct to the end of 1938.

Louis David Sleeth (26 February 1916 – 29 November 1990) was an Australian rules footballer who played with Richmond in the Victorian Football League (VFL).

== Family ==
The son of Charles Alfred Sleeth (1883–1923), and Johanna "Annie" Sleeth (1887-1966), née Ring, Louis David Sleeth was born at Lilydale, Victoria on 26 February 1916.

He married Dalila Mary "Dolly" Garton (1920-2004) in 1947.

== Football ==
=== Box Hill (ESFL) ===
He played in 160 games over 20 seasons — 1929-1934, 1936, 1939, 1941-1948 — for the Box Hill Football Club in the Eastern Suburbs Football League.

=== East Burwood (FL) ===
He played for the East Burwood Football Club in the Federal Football League in 1935.

=== Richmond (VFL) ===
A left-footed half-forward flanker, Sleeth was cleared from Box Hill to Richmond on 21 April 1937. He played for two seasons (1937 and 1938), and played in 20 First XVIII matches, scoring 22 goals, and in 14 Second XVIII matches, scoring 23 goals.

=== 7 August 1937 ===
On 7 August 1937, as a member of the greatly weakened Richmond side that played against Essendon, at the Punt Road Ground — Percy Bentley, Jack Dyer, and Dick Harris were absent interstate with the VFL, and George Smeaton and Billy Wells were both injured — Sleeth, best on the ground, kicked six of Richmond's 13 goals (including the winning goal), in an unexpected two point victory.

=== 1937 Best First-Year Players ===
In September 1937, The Argus selected Sleeth in its team of 1937's first-year players.

		Best First-Year Players (1937)	
Backs	Bernie Treweek (Fitzroy)	Reg Henderson (Richmond)	Lawrence Morgan (Fitzroy)
H/Backs	Gordon Waters (Hawthorn)	Bill Cahill (Essendon)	Eddie Morcom (North Melbourne)
Centre Line	Ted Buckley (Melbourne)	George Bates (Richmond)	Jack Kelly (St Kilda)
H/Forwards	Col Williamson (St Kilda)	Ray Watts (Essendon)	Don Dilks (Footscray)
Forwards	Lou Sleeth (Richmond)	Sel Murray (North Melbourne)	Charlie Pierce (Hawthorn)
Rucks/Rover	Reg Garvin (St Kilda)	Sandy Patterson (South Melbourne)	Des Fothergill (Collingwood)
Second Ruck	Lawrence Morgan	Col Williamson	Lou Sleeth

=== Preston (VFA) ===
Cleared from Box Hill to Preston on 17 April 1940. He played in 14 games and scored 30 goals in the 1940 season.
