= Eddie Morcom =

Australian rules footballer, born 1917

Personal information
- Full name: Edwin James Morcom
- Born: 17 May 1917; Carlton, Victoria
- Died: 20 August 2007 (aged 90)
- Original team: West Melbourne
- Height: 178 cm (5 ft 10 in)
- Weight: 77 kg (170 lb)
- Position: Half back / Half forward

Playing career^{1}
| Years | Club | Games (Goals) |
| 1937–39, 1944–45 | North Melbourne | 75 (18) |
| 1946 | Brunswick (VFA) | 16 (17) |
- ^{1} Playing statistics correct to the end of 1946.

Edwin James Morcom (17 May 1917 – 20 August 2007) was an Australian rules footballer who played with North Melbourne in the Victorian Football League (VFL).

== Family ==
The son of Edwin James Morcom (1887–1946), and Ellen Morcom (1891–1954), née McCarthy, Edwin James Morcom was born at Carlton, Victoria on 17 May 1917.

He married Cloris Jean Kohl (1920-1994) in 1938.

== Football ==
On 21 April 1937 he was cleared from the West Melbourne Football Club, in the VFA Sub-District Association, to North Melbourne.

=== North Melbourne (VFL) ===
He made his debut for North Melbourne on the half-forward flank against Hawthorn, at the Arden Street Oval, on 24 April 1937.

=== 1937 Best First-Year Players ===
In September 1937, The Argus selected Morcom in its team of 1937's first-year players.

| | | Best First-Year Players (1937) | |
|---|---|---|---|
| Backs | Bernie Treweek (Fitzroy) | Reg Henderson (Richmond) | Lawrence Morgan (Fitzroy) |
| H/Backs | Gordon Waters (Hawthorn) | Bill Cahill (Essendon) | Eddie Morcom (North Melbourne) |
| Centre Line | Ted Buckley (Melbourne) | George Bates (Richmond) | Jack Kelly (St Kilda) |
| H/Forwards | Col Williamson (St Kilda) | Ray Watts (Essendon) | Don Dilks (Footscray) |
| Forwards | Lou Sleeth (Richmond) | Sel Murray (North Melbourne) | Charlie Pierce (Hawthorn) |
| Rucks/Rover | Reg Garvin (St Kilda) | Sandy Patterson (South Melbourne) | Des Fothergill (Collingwood) |
| Second Ruck | Lawrence Morgan | Col Williamson | Lou Sleeth |

=== Brunswick (VFA) ===
On 10 April 1946, he was cleared from North Melbourne to Brunswick.

=== North Melbourne (VFL) ===
On 3 April 1947, he was cleared from Brunswick to North Melbourne. He played the entire season in the Seconds, and was one of the best on the ground in the team's victory over Richmond in the Second's Grand Final on 27 September 1947.

== Military service ==
Morcoms's career at North Melbourne was interrupted by his service in the Australian Army during World War II, where he served in Palestine and Greece.

=== Courts Martial ===
Morcom was court-martialled twice: (a) on 1 and 8 July 1940, and (b) on 24 March 1944.

== Death ==
He died on 20 August 2007, and was buried at Fawkner Crematorium and Memorial Park.
