= Reg Garvin =

Australian rules footballer, born 1912

Personal information
- Full name: Reginald William Garvin
- Born: 19 September 1912; Surry Hills, New South Wales
- Died: 1 December 1994 (aged 82)
- Original team: Newtown (NSWAFL)
- Height: 182 cm (6 ft 0 in)
- Weight: 87 kg (192 lb)

Playing career^{1}
Years	Club	Games (Goals)
1932–1936	Newtown (NSWAFL)	
1937–1946	St Kilda (VFL)	130 (33)
1947–1948	Prahran (VFA)	35 (15)

Coaching career
Years	Club	Games (W–L–D)
1942–1943	St Kilda (VFL)	24 (7–16–1)
- ^{1} Playing statistics correct to the end of 1948.

Reginald William Garvin (19 September 1912 – 1 December 1994) was an Australian rules footballer who played with St Kilda in the VFL. Garvin was a quick, tenacious, powerful, hard-working and dynamic centre half-forward in his prime.

== Family ==
The son of William James Garvin, and Maud Elizabeth Garvin (-1949), Reginald William Garvin was born in Surry Hills, New South Wales, on 19 September 1912.

He married Betty Edith Med (1915-1974) in 1939.

== Education ==
He was educated at Alexandria Public School.

== Football ==
=== Newtown (NSWAFL) ===
Originally from the Newtown Football Club in the New South Wales Australian Football League (NSWAFL), Garvin had already represented his state at interstate football nine times (including three games at the 1933 Sydney ANFC Carnival) by the time he arrived at St Kilda.

He won the Provan Medal, as the League's best and fairest player, in 1936.

=== St Kilda (VFL ===
A follower, he finished equal 4th in the 1941 Brownlow Medal and won the first of his two St Kilda best and fairest awards, the other coming in 1944.

He represented the VFL against South Australia on 12 July 1941.

For the 1942 and 1943 seasons Garvin was St Kilda's captain-coach.

=== 1937 Best First-Year Players ===
In September 1937, The Argus selected Garvin in its team of 1937's first-year players.

		Best First-Year Players (1937)	
Backs	Bernie Treweek (Fitzroy)	Reg Henderson (Richmond)	Lawrence Morgan (Fitzroy)
H/Backs	Gordon Waters (Hawthorn)	Bill Cahill (Essendon)	Eddie Morcom (North Melbourne)
Centre Line	Ted Buckley (Melbourne)	George Bates (Richmond)	Jack Kelly (St Kilda)
H/Forwards	Col Williamson (St Kilda)	Ray Watts (Essendon)	Don Dilks (Footscray)
Forwards	Lou Sleeth (Richmond)	Sel Murray (North Melbourne)	Charlie Pierce (Hawthorn)
Rucks/Rover	Reg Garvin (St Kilda)	Sandy Patterson (South Melbourne)	Des Fothergill (Collingwood)
Second Ruck	Lawrence Morgan	Col Williamson	Lou Sleeth

=== Prahran (VFA) ===
After leaving St Kilda in 1946 he joined Prahran in the VFA where he finished his career in 1948.
