= Sel Murray =

Australian rules footballer, born 1917

Personal information
- Full name: Norman Selwyn Murray
- Born: 23 November 1917; Carlton, Victoria
- Died: 29 May 1992 (aged 74); Braybrook, Victoria
- Original team: West Melbourne
- Height: 185 cm (6 ft 1 in)
- Weight: 76 kg (168 lb)

Playing career^{1}
| Years | Club | Games (Goals) |
| 1937–1944 | North Melbourne | 102 (402) |
| 1945–1946 | Richmond | 13 (50) |
| 1948 | North Melbourne | 6 (9) |
| Total | | 121 (461) |
- ^{1} Playing statistics correct to the end of 1948.

Career highlights
- North Melbourne Leading Goalkicker 1938–1942; VFL Leading Goalkicker Medal 1941; North Melbourne Seconds Premiership Player 1947; Interstate Games:- 2

Norman Selwyn 'Sel' Murray (23 November 1917 – 29 May 1992) was an Australian rules footballer who played with the North Melbourne Football Club in the Victorian Football League (VFL) from 1937 to 1944 and then for the Richmond Football Club in 1945 and 1946.

Mainly used as a full forward, he played the 1947 season for North Melbourne seconds, leading the competition goalkicking with 123 for the season and playing in the seconds' premiership side. He ended his career back in the North Melbourne senior side for much of the 1948 season. His 88 goals in 1941 was the most in the League and he took just 73 games to reach 300 career goals which is equal third fastest of all time.

Murray also served in the Australian Army for two months in 1940 during World War II.

== 1937 Best First-Year Players ==
In September 1937, The Argus selected Murray in its team of 1937's first-year players.

| | | Best First-Year Players (1937) | |
|---|---|---|---|
| Backs | Bernie Treweek (Fitzroy) | Reg Henderson (Richmond) | Lawrence Morgan (Fitzroy) |
| H/Backs | Gordon Waters (Hawthorn) | Bill Cahill (Essendon) | Eddie Morcom (North Melbourne) |
| Centre Line | Ted Buckley (Melbourne) | George Bates (Richmond) | Jack Kelly (St Kilda) |
| H/Forwards | Col Williamson (St Kilda) | Ray Watts (Essendon) | Don Dilks (Footscray) |
| Forwards | Lou Sleeth (Richmond) | Sel Murray (North Melbourne) | Charlie Pierce (Hawthorn) |
| Rucks/Rover | Reg Garvin (St Kilda) | Sandy Patterson (South Melbourne) | Des Fothergill (Collingwood) |
| Second Ruck | Lawrence Morgan | Col Williamson | Lou Sleeth |
