= Ken Feltscheer =

Australian rules footballer, born 1915

Personal information
- Full name: Kenneth John Feltscheer
- Born: 9 June 1915; Neerim, Victoria
- Died: 25 December 2017 (aged 102)
- Original teams: Neerim South, Moe
- Height: 178 cm (5 ft 10 in)
- Weight: 80.5 kg (177 lb)
- Positions: Half forward, wing

Playing career^{1}
Years	Club	Games (Goals)
1935–36	Melbourne	4 (0)
1937–40, 1943	Hawthorn	43 (15)
Total		47 (15)
- ^{1} Playing statistics correct to the end of 1943.

Ken Feltscheer (9 June 1915 – 25 December 2017) was an Australian rules footballer who played with Melbourne and Hawthorn in the Victorian Football League (VFL). He turned 100 in June 2015 and died on 25 December 2017 at the age of 102.

Feltscheer grew up on a dairy farm near Neerim South, and playing under big brother Eric's captaincy he kicked 10 goals one afternoon. That got him noticed by Moe who were in the Central Gippsland FL at the time. He kicked ten goals on debut then Melbourne got interested in him. After an invitation by letter he moved to the city. He played in two reserves premierships under seconds coach "Bull" Adams.

Melbourne were interested in former Hawthorn Fullback Bert Chandler, who had returned from Western Australia. Feltscheer and teammate Gordon Waters were part of a player swap for Chandler in 1937.

Feltscheer retired from league football at the end of 1940 but was talked into helping out because of wartime player shortage by playing 5 games in 1943.

Alec Mawhinney who played at Melbourne in 1919 was his uncle.

== See also ==
- List of centenarians (sportspeople)
