= Bernie Treweek =

Australian rules footballer, born 1914

Personal information
- Full name: Bernard Alton Treweek
- Born: 27 September 1914; Broken Hill, New South Wales
- Died: 27 November 1957 (aged 43); Heidelberg, Victoria
- Original team: Caulfield Football Club
- Height: 178 cm (5 ft 10 in)
- Weight: 79 kg (174 lb)

Playing career^{1}
Years	Club	Games (Goals)
1934–1935	Carlton	6 (0)
1937–1940	Fitzroy	57 (0)
Total		63 (0)
- ^{1} Playing statistics correct to the end of 1940.

Bernard Alton Treweek (27 September 1914 – 27 November 1957) was an Australian rules footballer who played for the Carlton Football Club and Fitzroy Football Club in the Victorian Football League (VFL).

== Family ==
The son of Laurence Treweek (1874-1949), and Catherine Treweek, née Watts (1875-1959), Bernard Alton Treweek was born at Broken Hill, New South Wales on 27 September 1914.

He married Helen Ferguson (1917-1998) in 1936. They had four children; two of whom died in their infancy.

== Education ==
He was educated at the Christian Brothers' College in Victoria Parade.

== Football ==
=== Carlton (VFL) ===
Recruited from the Caulfield Football Club in the Metropolitan Amateur Football Association (MAFA), although a regular Seconds player, he played in six senior games for Carlton over his three seasons with the team (1934-1936).

=== Fitzroy (VFL) ===
He played in 57 senior games for Fitzroy over four seasons (1937-1940).

=== 1937 Best First-Year Players ===
In September 1937, The Argus selected Treweek in its team of 1937's first-year players.

		Best First-Year Players (1937)	
Backs	Bernie Treweek (Fitzroy)	Reg Henderson (Richmond)	Lawrence Morgan (Fitzroy)
H/Backs	Gordon Waters (Hawthorn)	Bill Cahill (Essendon)	Eddie Morcom (North Melbourne)
Centre Line	Ted Buckley (Melbourne)	George Bates (Richmond)	Jack Kelly (St Kilda)
H/Forwards	Col Williamson (St Kilda)	Ray Watts (Essendon)	Don Dilks (Footscray)
Forwards	Lou Sleeth (Richmond)	Sel Murray (North Melbourne)	Charlie Pierce (Hawthorn)
Rucks/Rover	Reg Garvin (St Kilda)	Sandy Patterson (South Melbourne)	Des Fothergill (Collingwood)
Second Ruck	Lawrence Morgan	Col Williamson	Lou Sleeth

== Death ==
He died at the Austin Hospital, in Heidelberg, Victoria on 27 November 1957.
