= Jack Kelly (Australian footballer) =

Australian rules footballer (1916–1971)

Personal information
- Full name: John Frederick Kelly
- Born: 15 July 1916; Mildura, Victoria
- Died: 23 June 1971 (aged 54); Mount Gambier, South Australia
- Original team: Red Cliffs (MDFL)
- Height: 174 cm (5 ft 9 in)
- Weight: 69 kg (152 lb)
- Position: Wing

Playing career^{1}
Years	Club	Games (Goals)
1937–42, 1944	St Kilda	89 (33)
- ^{1} Playing statistics correct to the end of 1944.

John Frederick Kelly (15 July 1916 – 23 June 1971) was an Australian rules footballer who played with St Kilda in the Victorian Football League (VFL).

== Professional athlete ==
A finalist in the 1939 Stawell Gift (he finished fourth), he won the Bendigo Gift (also 130 yards) two days later.

== Football ==
=== Red Cliffs (MDFL) ===
Kelly was recruited from the Red Cliffs Football Club in the Mildura District Football League, where he won the 1935 Mildura Junior Football League best and fairest award.

=== 1937 Best First-Year Players ===
In September 1937, The Argus selected Kelly in its team of 1937's first-year players.

		Best First-Year Players (1937)	
Backs	Bernie Treweek (Fitzroy)	Reg Henderson (Richmond)	Lawrence Morgan (Fitzroy)
H/Backs	Gordon Waters (Hawthorn)	Bill Cahill (Essendon)	Eddie Morcom (North Melbourne)
Centre Line	Ted Buckley (Melbourne)	George Bates (Richmond)	Jack Kelly (St Kilda)
H/Forwards	Col Williamson (St Kilda)	Ray Watts (Essendon)	Don Dilks (Footscray)
Forwards	Lou Sleeth (Richmond)	Sel Murray (North Melbourne)	Charlie Pierce (Hawthorn)
Rucks/Rover	Reg Garvin (St Kilda)	Sandy Patterson (South Melbourne)	Des Fothergill (Collingwood)
Second Ruck	Lawrence Morgan	Col Williamson	Lou Sleeth

=== South Gambier (MGDFA) ===
In 1949 he was appointed captain-coach of the South Gambier Football Club in the Mount Gambier and District Football Association.

== Military service ==
He served in the RAAF during World War II.
