= Gordon Waters =

Australian rules footballer, born 1914

Personal information
- Full name: Gordon Waters
- Born: 27 January 1914; Wedderburn, Victoria
- Died: 15 May 1983 (aged 69); Kew, Victoria
- Original teams: Wedderburn, Melbourne reserves
- Height: 173 cm (5 ft 8 in)
- Weight: 74 kg (163 lb)
- Position: Backman

Playing career^{1}
Years	Club	Games (Goals)
1937–41	Hawthorn	32 (0)
- ^{1} Playing statistics correct to the end of 1941.

Gordon Waters (27 January 1914 – 15 May 1983) was an Australian rules footballer who played with Hawthorn in the Victorian Football League (VFL).

Initially from Wedderburn, Waters was signed He tried out at Footscray and played in some trial games before being offered a place on the Melbourne reserves list. Waters and teammate Ken Feltscheer were part of a player swap for Bert Chandler in 1937.

The rugged defender was give 3 votes by the Argus sportswriter for his game against Essendon in 1938.

== 1937 Best First-Year Players ==
In September 1937, The Argus selected Waters in its team of 1937's first-year players.

		Best First-Year Players (1937)	
Backs	Bernie Treweek (Fitzroy)	Reg Henderson (Richmond)	Lawrence Morgan (Fitzroy)
H/Backs	Gordon Waters (Hawthorn)	Bill Cahill (Essendon)	Eddie Morcom (North Melbourne)
Centre Line	Ted Buckley (Melbourne)	George Bates (Richmond)	Jack Kelly (St Kilda)
H/Forwards	Col Williamson (St Kilda)	Ray Watts (Essendon)	Don Dilks (Footscray)
Forwards	Lou Sleeth (Richmond)	Sel Murray (North Melbourne)	Charlie Pierce (Hawthorn)
Rucks/Rover	Reg Garvin (St Kilda)	Sandy Patterson (South Melbourne)	Des Fothergill (Collingwood)
Second Ruck	Lawrence Morgan	Col Williamson	Lou Sleeth
