= Sandy Patterson =

Australian rules footballer

Personal information
- Full name: Arthur Edward Patterson
- Born: 21 March 1916; Kerang, Victoria
- Died: 23 May 1997 (aged 81)
- Height: 183 cm (6 ft 0 in)
- Weight: 81 kg (179 lb)

Playing career^{1}
Years	Club	Games (Goals)
1937–1938, 1940	South Melbourne	26 (17)
- ^{1} Playing statistics correct to the end of 1940.

Arthur Edward "Sandy" Patterson (21 March 1916 – 23 May 1997) was an Australian rules footballer who played with South Melbourne in the Victorian Football League (VFL).

Patterson enlisted to serve in the Australian Army during World War II, in late 1940, but contracted measles and was discharged after four months.

Patterson died in May 1997.

== 1937 Best First-Year Players ==
In September 1937, The Argus selected Patterson in its team of 1937's first-year players.

		Best First-Year Players (1937)	
Backs	Bernie Treweek (Fitzroy)	Reg Henderson (Richmond)	Lawrence Morgan (Fitzroy)
H/Backs	Gordon Waters (Hawthorn)	Bill Cahill (Essendon)	Eddie Morcom (North Melbourne)
Centre Line	Ted Buckley (Melbourne)	George Bates (Richmond)	Jack Kelly (St Kilda)
H/Forwards	Col Williamson (St Kilda)	Ray Watts (Essendon)	Don Dilks (Footscray)
Forwards	Lou Sleeth (Richmond)	Sel Murray (North Melbourne)	Charlie Pierce (Hawthorn)
Rucks/Rover	Reg Garvin (St Kilda)	Sandy Patterson (South Melbourne)	Des Fothergill (Collingwood)
Second Ruck	Lawrence Morgan	Col Williamson	Lou Sleeth
