= Caroline Beasley =

Irish jockey

- Occupation: Jockey

Significant horses
- Eliogarty

Caroline Robinson, better known under her maiden name, Caroline Beasley, is an Irish jockey. She was the first woman to ride a winner at the Cheltenham Festival in Christie's Foxhunter Chase (in 1983), as well as Aintree's Fox Hunters race (in 1986).

== Early life ==
Eliogarty
- Breed: Thoroughbred
- Sire: Lucky Brief
- Grandsire: Counsel
- Dam: Natanya
- Damsire: Menelek
- Sex: Male
- Foaled: 1975
- Colour: Chestnut
- Trainer: John Hasset

Beasley's father, Jeremy Beasley, and mother, Pat Beasley, were both involved in horse racing. She was raised in Shropshire. Her first horse, Eliogarty, whom she rode in Cheltenham and Aintree, was a gift from her father, and was trained in County Clare, Ireland, by John Hasset.
