= Alec Mawhinney =

Australian rules footballer

Personal information
- Full name: Alec Mawhinney
- Born: 1 December 1894
- Died: 5 March 1967 (aged 72)

Playing career^{1}
Years	Club	Games (Goals)
1919	Melbourne	9 (0)
- ^{1} Playing statistics correct to the end of 1919.

Alec Mawhinney (1 December 1894 – 5 March 1967) was an Australian rules footballer who played for the Melbourne Football Club in the Victorian Football League (VFL).

After leaving Melbourne, Mawhinney played for Healesville in 1923.

His nephew, Ken Feltscheer played for Melbourne and Hawthorn between 1935 and 1943.
