= Don Dilks =

Australian rules footballer, born 1912

Personal information
- Full name: Donald Ian Dilks
- Born: 20 May 1912
- Died: 13 September 1981 (aged 69)
- Original team: Spotswood Citizens
- Height: 180 cm (5 ft 11 in)
- Weight: 74 kg (163 lb)

Playing career^{1}
Years	Club	Games (Goals)
1937–38	Footscray	6 (0)
- ^{1} Playing statistics correct to the end of 1938.

Donald Ian Dilks (20 May 1912 – 13 September 1981) was a former Australian rules footballer who played with Footscray in the Victorian Football League (VFL).

== Family ==
The son of John Ernest Dilks (1891-1922), and Minnie Victoria Dilks (1893-1982), née Goding, Donald Ian Dilks was born on 20 May 1912.

He married Jean Elizabeth Deller (1913–2013), the sister of Williamstown footballers Eddie Deller and Reg Deller, in 1938.

== Football ==
Recruited from Spotswood Citizens.

=== 1937 Best First-Year Players ===
In September 1937, The Argus selected Dilks in its team of 1937's first-year players.

		Best First-Year Players (1937)	
Backs	Bernie Treweek (Fitzroy)	Reg Henderson (Richmond)	Lawrence Morgan (Fitzroy)
H/Backs	Gordon Waters (Hawthorn)	Bill Cahill (Essendon)	Eddie Morcom (North Melbourne)
Centre Line	Ted Buckley (Melbourne)	George Bates (Richmond)	Jack Kelly (St Kilda)
H/Forwards	Col Williamson (St Kilda)	Ray Watts (Essendon)	Don Dilks (Footscray)
Forwards	Lou Sleeth (Richmond)	Sel Murray (North Melbourne)	Charlie Pierce (Hawthorn)
Rucks/Rover	Reg Garvin (St Kilda)	Sandy Patterson (South Melbourne)	Des Fothergill (Collingwood)
Second Ruck	Lawrence Morgan	Col Williamson	Lou Sleeth
