= George Bates (Australian footballer) =

Australian rules footballer

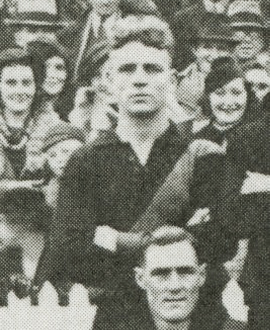
- Bates during his Richmond career

Personal information
- Full name: George William Henry Bates
- Born: 5 January 1914; Abbotsford, Victoria
- Died: 1 April 1983 (aged 69); Geelong West, Victoria
- Original team: Northcote (VFA)
- Height: 180 cm (5 ft 11 in)
- Weight: 80 kg (176 lb)

Playing career^{1}
Years	Club	Games (Goals)
1933	Collingwood	1 (0)
1937–1939	Richmond	26 (4)
1940	South Melbourne	3 (0)
Total		30 (4)
- ^{1} Playing statistics correct to the end of 1940.

George William Henry Bates (5 January 1914 – 1 April 1983) was an Australian rules footballer who played with Collingwood, Richmond and South Melbourne in the Victorian Football League (VFL).

Bates returned to his original club, Northcote, after just once season at Collingwood. He was a centre half-back in Northcote's 1934 premiership team and had a starring role in another premiership two years later.

He resumed his VFL career in 1937 and made 14 appearances that year, including a semi final.

After two more seasons with Richmond, Bates made his way to South Melbourne in 1940.

== 1937 Best First-Year Players ==
In September 1937, The Argus selected Bates in its team of 1937's first-year players.

		Best First-Year Players (1937)	
Backs	Bernie Treweek (Fitzroy)	Reg Henderson (Richmond)	Lawrence Morgan (Fitzroy)
H/Backs	Gordon Waters (Hawthorn)	Bill Cahill (Essendon)	Eddie Morcom (North Melbourne)
Centre Line	Ted Buckley (Melbourne)	George Bates (Richmond)	Jack Kelly (St Kilda)
H/Forwards	Col Williamson (St Kilda)	Ray Watts (Essendon)	Don Dilks (Footscray)
Forwards	Lou Sleeth (Richmond)	Sel Murray (North Melbourne)	Charlie Pierce (Hawthorn)
Rucks/Rover	Reg Garvin (St Kilda)	Sandy Patterson (South Melbourne)	Des Fothergill (Collingwood)
Second Ruck	Lawrence Morgan	Col Williamson	Lou Sleeth
