= Des Fothergill =

Australian rules footballer and cricketer

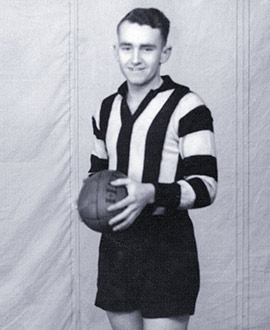
- Fothergill in the late 1930s

Personal information
- Full name: Desmond Hugh Fothergill
- Born: 15 July 1920; Northcote, Victoria, Australia
- Died: 16 March 1996 (aged 75); Melbourne, Victoria, Australia
- Original team: Collingwood Tech
- Height: 178 cm (5 ft 10 in)
- Weight: 88 kg (13 st 12 lb)
- Positions: half-forward, rover

Playing career^{1}
Years	Club	Games (Goals)
1937–1940, 1945–1947	Collingwood	111 (337)

Representative team honours
Years	Team	Games (Goals)
	Victoria	2 (4)
- ^{1} Playing statistics correct to the end of 1947.

Career highlights
- Brownlow Medallist: 1940 (equal); VFL Leading Goalkicker 1946; Recorder Cup (Williamstown): 1941; Collingwood best and fairest 1937, 1938, 1940; Collingwood leading goalkicker 1940, 1945, 1946; Collingwood Team of the Century (half-forward flank); Collingwood Football Club Hall of Fame

Desmond Hugh Fothergill (15 July 1920 – 16 March 1996) was an Australian rules footballer who played for Collingwood Football Club in the Victorian Football League (VFL) and for Williamstown Football Club in the Victorian Football Association (VFA). He was also a noted cricketer, representing Victoria in the Sheffield Shield.

Despite a short football career interrupted by World War II and ended by injury, Fothergill was recognized as one of the finest small players of his era, winning almost every available accolade at both club and league level.

== Football career ==
From Collingwood Tech, Fothergill was a gifted sportsman who made his VFL debut aged 16, for Collingwood in 1937. Fothergill was a small midfielder/half-forward who seemed too small at the start, at 172 centimetres (5 ft 8 in) and 73 kilograms (11 st 7 lb), but his brilliance as a footballer was something that overshadowed his liabilities. Fothergill made an impact straight away as he played brilliant football, winning a Copeland Trophy as Collingwood's best and fairest in his debut season.

In 1938, Fothergill was once again a dominant member of the side, winning his second consecutive Copeland Trophy at the age of 18, and two years later, in 1940, Fothergill won his third Copeland Trophy and topped the clubʼs goalkicking with 56.

Also in 1940, Fothergill and South Melbourne player Herbie Matthews tied for first place in Brownlow Medal voting with a then-record 32 votes. At the time, neither player won the Brownlow Medal itself, as their records could not be separated on countback and there was no provision for a shared medal, but both men were awarded Brownlow Medals in 1989 when the VFL decided to retrospectively eliminate the countback from the award.

=== 1937 Best First-Year Players ===
In September 1937, The Argus selected Fothergill in its team of 1937's first-year players.

		Best First-Year Players (1937)	
Backs	Bernie Treweek (Fitzroy)	Reg Henderson (Richmond)	Lawrence Morgan (Fitzroy)
H/Backs	Gordon Waters (Hawthorn)	Bill Cahill (Essendon)	Eddie Morcom (North Melbourne)
Centre Line	Ted Buckley (Melbourne)	George Bates (Richmond)	Jack Kelly (St Kilda)
H/Forwards	Col Williamson (St Kilda)	Ray Watts (Essendon)	Don Dilks (Footscray)
Forwards	Lou Sleeth (Richmond)	Sel Murray (North Melbourne)	Charlie Pierce (Hawthorn)
Rucks/Rover	Reg Garvin (St Kilda)	Sandy Patterson (South Melbourne)	Des Fothergill (Collingwood)
Second Ruck	Lawrence Morgan	Col Williamson	Lou Sleeth

=== Switch to Williamstown and war service ===
In 1941, Fothergill followed teammate and friend Ron Todd to Victorian Football Association (VFA) club Williamstown without receiving a clearance from the VFL, as many other high-profile League players had done during the VFA's throw-pass era. In his sole season with Williamstown, he won the Recorder Cup and VFA Medal as best and fairest in the VFA, polling a record 62 votes and winning by a huge margin of 29 votes. In his 20 games, Fothergill kicked 78 goals and also won the Williamstown best and fairest award. He was made vice-captain but captained the side for much of the season due to the absence of captain-coach, Gordon Ogden, due to illness, injuries, business commitments and a two-match suspension. Fothergill had signed with Williamstown until the end of 1943, but when VFA competition was suspended from 1942 until 1944 due to World War II, his career at Williamstown came to an end as the contract he signed had lapsed. He joined the army in 1942, and was forced to move on after a knee injury when in Darwin, Northern Territory.

=== Return to Collingwood ===
When the VFA resumed competition in 1945, Fothergill, having never formally been cleared from the club, returned to Collingwood that season after his three-year VFL ban for crossing without a clearance expired. He dominated at half-forward for the club again, despite being slower and having injury problems. In 1946 Fothergill kicked 62 goals in seventeen games and was the VFL's leading goalkicker in the home-and-home season, although he ultimately finished second for the League's Leading Goalkicker Medal after his total was passed in the finals by Essendon's Bill Brittingham. He was forced to retire in 1947 due to a leg injury. Fothergill was named in the Collingwood Team of the Century, and was inducted into the Australian Football Hall of Fame in 2000. The award for the best young player in the modern Victorian Football League (which is the successor to the former VFA) is named the Fothergill–Round–Mitchell Medal in honour of Fothergill, Barry Round and Sam Mitchell.

== Cricket career ==
Fothergill was also an accomplished cricketer, playing cricket in the summer throughout his football career. A right-handed batsman and leg-break bowler, he played 27 first-class cricket matches for Victoria, making 1404 runs at 39.00 with one century. He made his hundred against South Australia in 1947 and once made 99 against the Australian Services XI. He played district cricket for Northcote, appearing in 149 matches between 1935–36 and 1952–53 with strong all-round performances, averaging 41.05 with the bat and taking 122 wickets at 27.35 with the ball. After retiring from football, Fothergill moved to England and played for the Enfield Cricket Club in the Lancashire League in 1949 and 1950.
