= Col Williamson =

Australian rules footballer, born 1913

Personal information
- Full name: Colin Magnus Williamson
- Born: 31 December 1913; Collingwood, Victoria
- Died: 29 May 1997 (aged 83)
- Original team: Northcote (VFA)
- Height: 185 cm (6 ft 1 in)
- Weight: 85 kg (187 lb)
- Position: Utility

Playing career^{1}
Years	Club	Games (Goals)
1937–1946	St Kilda	165 (44)

Coaching career
Years	Club	Games (W–L–D)
1952–1953	St Kilda	37 (7–30–0)
- ^{1} Playing statistics correct to the end of 1946.

Colin Magnus Williamson (31 December 1913 – 29 May 1997) was an Australian rules footballer who played with and coached St Kilda in the Victorian Football League (VFL).

== Football ==
Although primarily a ruckman, Williamson also spent a lot of time in defence.

=== Northcote (VFA) ===
He started out at Northcote, where he was a member of a premiership team.

=== St Kilda (VFL) ===
He kicked 18 goals in his debut season at St Kilda. Perhaps his best year was 1939 when he finished the Brownlow Medal count as his club's top vote getter.

=== Brighton (VFA) ===
Williamson coached Brighton to their first and only VFA premiership in 1948.

=== St Kilda (VFL) ===
St Kilda signed him on as their coach for the 1952 season and he remained in the role for two years.

== 1937 Best First-Year Players ==
In September 1937, The Argus selected Williamson in its team of 1937's first-year players.

		Best First-Year Players (1937)	
Backs	Bernie Treweek (Fitzroy)	Reg Henderson (Richmond)	Lawrence Morgan (Fitzroy)
H/Backs	Gordon Waters (Hawthorn)	Bill Cahill (Essendon)	Eddie Morcom (North Melbourne)
Centre Line	Ted Buckley (Melbourne)	George Bates (Richmond)	Jack Kelly (St Kilda)
H/Forwards	Col Williamson (St Kilda)	Ray Watts (Essendon)	Don Dilks (Footscray)
Forwards	Lou Sleeth (Richmond)	Sel Murray (North Melbourne)	Charlie Pierce (Hawthorn)
Rucks/Rover	Reg Garvin (St Kilda)	Sandy Patterson (South Melbourne)	Des Fothergill (Collingwood)
Second Ruck	Lawrence Morgan	Col Williamson	Lou Sleeth
