= Reg Henderson =

Australian rules footballer, born 1910

Personal information
- Full name: Reginald Ernest Henderson
- Born: 1 December 1910; Geelong, Victoria
- Died: 26 November 2003 (aged 92)
- Original team: Carnegie
- Height: 183 cm (6 ft 0 in)
- Weight: 72 kg (159 lb)

Playing career^{1}
Years	Club	Games (Goals)
1931–37	Camberwell (VFA)	63 (14)
1937–38	Richmond	28 (8)
1939–41	Camberwell (VFA)	45 (6)
- ^{1} Playing statistics correct to the end of 1941.

Career highlights
- Camberwell B&F

Reginald Ernest Henderson (1 December 1910 – 26 November 2003) was an Australian rules footballer who played with Richmond in the Victorian Football League (VFL).

Henderson was a defender and occasional ruckman who joined Camberwell in 1931 from the Carnegie junior team. After several successful seasons at Camberwell he spent two seasons at Richmond before returning to Camberwell where he finished his career. Altogether he spent eight seasons at Camberwell, winning one Best and Fairest award and representing the VFA once.

Henderson later became a prominent Victoria Police Force detective, and was known as “Hawkeye” because of his photographic memory. He was reputed to be able to stand on the steps of Flinders Street Station and arrest wanted criminals after memorising their photographs from the police wanted sheets. After retiring from the Police Force, Reg Henderson took a role as head of security at the Tasmanian Casino.

== 1937 Best First-Year Players ==
In September 1937, The Argus selected Henderson in its team of 1937's first-year players.

		Best First-Year Players (1937)	
Backs	Bernie Treweek (Fitzroy)	Reg Henderson (Richmond)	Lawrence Morgan (Fitzroy)
H/Backs	Gordon Waters (Hawthorn)	Bill Cahill (Essendon)	Eddie Morcom (North Melbourne)
Centre Line	Ted Buckley (Melbourne)	George Bates (Richmond)	Jack Kelly (St Kilda)
H/Forwards	Col Williamson (St Kilda)	Ray Watts (Essendon)	Don Dilks (Footscray)
Forwards	Lou Sleeth (Richmond)	Sel Murray (North Melbourne)	Charlie Pierce (Hawthorn)
Rucks/Rover	Reg Garvin (St Kilda)	Sandy Patterson (South Melbourne)	Des Fothergill (Collingwood)
Second Ruck	Lawrence Morgan	Col Williamson	Lou Sleeth
