= Foxhunters' Open Hunters' Chase =

Steeplechase horse race in Great Britain

Randox Health Fox Hunters' Chase
2026
Barton Snow	Lets Go Champ	Take All

Previous years
2025
Gracchus De Balme	Jet Plane	Lifetime Ambition
2024
Its On The Line	Bennys King	Annamix
2023
Famous Clermont	Bennys King	Lough Derg Spirit
2022
Latenightpass	Cat Tiger	Porlock Bay
2021
Cousin Pascal	Latenightpass	Cat Tiger

2020-2010
2019
Top Wood	Burning Ambition	Road To Riches
2018
Balnaslow	Bear's Affair	Greensalt
2017
Dineur	Balnaslow	Big Fella Thanks
2016
On The Fringe	Dineur	Mendip Express
2015
On The Fringe	Pacha Du Polder	Last Time D'albain
2014
Warne	Tartan Snow	Mossey Joe
2013
Tartan Snow	Cool Friend	Rash Move
2012
Cloudy Lane	Roulez Cool	Herons Well
2011
Baby Run	Boxer Georg	Offshore Account

2010-2003
2010
Silver Adonis	Moncadou	Blu Teen
2009
Trust Fund	Christy Beamish	Having A Cut
2008
Christy Beamish	Katarino	Holy Joe
2007
Scots Grey	Pak Jack	Where Now
2006
Katarino	Christy Beamish	Beachcomber Bay
2005
Katarino	Caught at Dawn	Montifault
2004
Forest Gunner	Sikander A Azam	Gun'N Roses II
2003
Divet Hill	General Wolfe	I'm The Man

The Foxhunters' Open Hunters' Chase is a National Hunt steeplechase in Great Britain for amateur riders which is open to horses aged six years or older. It is run at Aintree over a distance of about 2 miles and 5 furlongs (2 miles, 5 furlongs and 19 yards, or 4,242 metres), and it is scheduled to take place each year in April.

The Foxhunters' is one of only three races run over the Grand National fences at the Aintree Festival, the other two races being the Topham Chase and the Grand National itself. The race is currently sponsored by Randox Laboratories.

The race was originally run over the full Grand National distance.

== Records ==
Most successful horse since 1946 (3 wins):

- Credit Call – 1972, 1975, 1976

Leading jockey since 1946 (3 wins):

- Sam Waley-Cohen – Katarino (2005, 2006), Warne (2014)

Leading trainer since 1946 (4 wins):

- Arthur Stephenson – Sea Knight (1963, 1965), Credit Call (1972, 1975)

== Winners ==
- All amateur jockeys.

Year	Winner	Age	Jockey	Trainer
1947	Lucky Purchase	9	J Nichols	S Banks
1948	San Michele	8	Guy Cunard	Guy Cunard
1949	Ballyhartfield	10	John Straker	J Makin
1950	Hillmere	17	Peter Brookshaw	L Dalton
1951	Candy II	9	R Brewis	R Brewis
1952	Pampeenne II	9	H Alexander	H Alexander
1953	Solo Call	9	M Brewis	M Brewis
1954	Dark Stranger	9	John Bosley	L Colville
1955	Happymint	10	Andrew Moralee	J Wight
1956	Mr Shanks	9	J Everitt	J Keith
1957	Colledge Master	7	Laurie Morgan	Laurie Morgan
1958	Surprise Packet	9	T Johnson	Mrs S Richards
1959	Merryman II	8	Charlie Scott	Neville Crump
1960	April Queen	9	John Daniell	Mervyn Fear
1961	Colledge Master	11	Laurie Morgan	Laurie Morgan
1962	Dominion	10	Bill Foulkes	K Beeston
1963	Sea Knight	8	P Nicholson	Arthur Stephenson
1964	Aerial III	8	John Daniell	Roddy Armytage
1965	Sea Knight	10	P Nicholson	Arthur Stephenson
1966	Sulbaltern	12	John Lawrence	C Alexander
1967	Minto Burn	11	B Surtees	Miss B Johnson
1968	Juan	12	Peter Wills	Peter Wills
1969	Bitter Lemon	8	V Rowe	V Rowe
1970	Lismateige	7	A Wates	P Wates
1971	Bright Willow	10	Robert Chugg	Alan Cure
1972	Credit Call	8	Chris Collins	Arthur Stephenson
1973	Bullock's Horn	10	Lord Oaksey	Bob Turnell
1974	Lord Fortune	11	D Edmunds	Mrs J Brutton
1975	Credit Call	11	Joey Newton	Arthur Stephenson
1976	Credit Call	12	Joey Newton	Mrs R Newton
1977	Happy Warrior	10	Nicky Henderson	Fred Winter
1978	Spartan Missile	6	John Thorne	John Thorne
1979	Spartan Missile	7	John Thorne	John Thorne
1980	Rolls Rambler	9	Oliver Sherwood	Fred Winter
1981	Grittar	8	Dick Saunders	Frank Gilman
1982	Lone Soldier	10	Peter Greenall	J Docker
1983	Atha Cliath	8	Willie Mullins	Paddy Mullins
1984	Gayle Warning	10	Sandy Dudgeon	John Dudgeon
1985	City Boy	10	Tim Thomson Jones	Mrs J Mann
1986	Eliogarty	11	Caroline Beasley	David Murray Smith
1987	Border Burg	10	Alan Hill	James Delahooke
1988	Newnham	11	Simon Andrews	Michael A Johnson
1989	Call Collect	8	Raymund Martin	Raymund S Martin
1990	Lean Ar Aghaidh	13	Denis Gray	Stan Mellor
1991	Double Turn	10	P Harding-Jones	John Jenkins
1992	Gee-A	13	Paul Murphy	Geoff Hubbard
1993	Double Silk	9	Ron Treloggen	Reg Wilkins
1994	Killeshin	8	G Brown	John Manners
1995	Sheer Jest	10	Alan Hill	W J Warner
1996	Rolling Ball	13	Richard Ford	Steve Brookshaw
1997	Blue Cheek	11	Robert Thornton	J Mahon
1998	Cavalero	9	A Charles-Jones	John Manners
1999	Elegant Lord	11	Philip Fenton	Enda Bolger
2000	Bells Life	11	David O'Meara	Philip Hobbs
2001	Gunner Welburn	9	J M Pritchard	Caroline Bailey
2002	Torduff Express	11	Polly Gundry	Paul Nicholls
2003	Divet Hill	9	Dale Jewett	Ann Hamilton
2004	Forest Gunner	10	Carrie Ford	Richard Ford
2005	Katarino	10	Sam Waley-Cohen	Robert Waley-Cohen
2006	Katarino	11	Sam Waley-Cohen	Robert Waley-Cohen
2007	Scots Grey	12	Richard Burton	Nicky Henderson
2008	Christy Beamish	11	Joshua Guerriero	Paul Jones
2009	Trust Fund	11	Tom Greenall	Richard Barber
2010	Silver Adonis	9	T Weston	Richard Newland
2011	Baby Run	11	Willie Twiston-Davies	Nigel Twiston-Davies
2012	Cloudy Lane	12	Richard Harding	Donald McCain
2013	Tartan Snow	13	Jamie Hamilton	Stuart Coltherd
2014	Warne	10	Sam Waley-Cohen	Brian Hamilton
2015	On The Fringe	10	Nina Carberry	Enda Bolger
2016	On The Fringe	11	Jamie Codd	Enda Bolger
2017	Dineur	11	James King	Mickey Bowen
2018	Balnaslow	11	Derek O'Connor	Graham John McKeever
2019	Top Wood	12	Tabitha Worsley	Kelly Morgan
	no race 2020 (Note: The 2020 running was cancelled because of the COVID-19 pandemic in the United Kingdom)
2021	Cousin Pascal	9	James King	Joe O'Shea
2022	Latenightpass	9	Gina Andrews	Tom Ellis
2023	Famous Clermont	8	William Biddick	Chris Barber
2024	Its On The Line	7	Derek O'Connor	Emmet Mullins
2025	Gracchus De Balme	9	Huw Edwards	Joe O'Shea
2026	Barton Snow	9	Henry Crow	Joe O'Shea

== See also ==
- Horse racing in Great Britain
- List of British National Hunt races
