= St James's Place Festival Hunter Chase =

Steeplechase horse race in Britain

- Class: 2
- Location: Cheltenham Racecourse; Cheltenham, England
- Inaugurated: 1904
- Race type: Hunter chase
- Sponsor: St. James's Place plc
- Website: Cheltenham

Race information
- Distance: 3m 2f 70y (5,294 metres)
- Surface: Turf
- Track: Left-handed
- Qualification: Five-years-old and up
- Weight: 11 st 10 lb (5yo); 12 st 0 lb (6yo+); Allowances; 7 lb for mares
- Purse: £50,000 (2023); 1st: £24,445

Foxhunter Chase Challenge Cup
2026
Barton Snow	Its On The Line	Music Drive

Previous years
2025
Wonderwall	Its On The Line	Willitgoahead
2024
Sine Nomine	Its On The Line	Time Leader
2023
Premier Magic	Its On The Line	Shantou Flyer
2022
Billaway	Winged Leader	Mighty Stowaway
2021
Porlock Bay	Billaway	Staker Wallace

2020-2011
2020
It Came To Pass	Billaway	Shantou Flyer
2019
Hazel Hill	Shantou Flyer	Top Wood
2018
Pacha Du Polder	Top Wood	Barel Of Laughs
2017
Pacha Du Polder	Wonderful Charm	Barel of Laughs
2016
On The Fringe	Marito	Paint The Clouds
2015
On The Fringe	Following Dreams	Paint The Clouds
2014
Tammys Hill	Carsonstown Boy	On The Fringe
2013
Salsify	Divine Intavention	Cottage Oak
2012
Salsify	Chapoturgeon	Oscar Delta
2011
Zemsky	Mid Div And Creep	Oscar Delta

2010-2001
2010
Baby Run	Kilty Storm	Reach for the Top
2009
Cappa Bleu	Turthen	Baby Run
2008
Amicelli	Bon Accord	Arctic Times
2007
Drombeag	Whyso Mayo	Ned Kelly
2006
Whyso Mayo	First Down Jets	Joe Blake
2005
Sleeping Night	Foly Pleasant	Placid Man
2004
Earthmover	Never Compromise	County Derry
2003
Kingscliff	Bright Approach	Last Option
2002
Last Option	Gunner Welburn	Torduff Express

2000-1991
2000
Cavalero	Real Value	Trade Dispute
1999
Castle Mane	Elegant Lord	Last Option
1998
Earthmover	Stay in Touch	Flashing Steel
1997
Fantus	Cab on Target	What A Hand
1996
Elegant Lord	Cool Dawn	Kerry Orchid
1995
Fantus	Holland House	Elegant Lord
1994
Double Silk	Teaplanter	Once Stung
1993
Double Silk	Kerry Orchid	Once Stung
1992
Rushing Wild	Ardesee	Federal Trooper
1991
Lovely Citizen	Dun Gay Lass	Crammer

1990-1988
1990
Call Collect	Old Nick	West Tip
1989
Three Counties	Kelly's Honor	Call Collect
1988
Certain Light	Three Counties	Acarine

The St James's Place Festival Hunters' Chase is a National Hunt steeplechase in Great Britain for amateur riders which is open to horses aged five years or older. It is run on the New Course at Cheltenham over a distance of about 3 miles and 2½ furlongs (3 miles 2 furlongs and 70 yards, or 5,294 metres), and during its running there are twenty-two fences to be jumped. It is scheduled to take place each year during the Cheltenham Festival in March.

The event is contested over the same course and distance as the Cheltenham Gold Cup, and it is sometimes referred to as the "amateur Gold Cup". It was established in 1904, and the inaugural running was won by Palmy Boy. It was backed by the insurance company Sun Alliance and London in 1972 and 1973, and for the following five years it was run without a sponsor. The art auctioneers Christie's supported the race from 1979 to 2012 and from 2013 to 2015 it was sponsored by the Country Gentleman's Association. Since 2016 it has been sponsored by St. James's Place plc. The race's full title is the St. James’s Place Festival Challenge Cup Open Hunters’ Chase. Until 2020 the race was known as the St James's Place Foxhunters' Chase - the word "fox" was removed from the title prior to the 2021 running.

Qualification for entry in the Festival Hunter Chase is based on a horse's previous performances in certain types of race within a specific period. To be eligible a horse must have finished first or second twice in hunter chases, or have won two open point-to-point races, or have won one open point-to-point race and finished first or second in a hunter chase.

Only professional jockeys competed in the 2021 running as amateur riders were excluded from the Cheltenham Festival due to restrictions on grassroots sport for the COVID-19 pandemic in the United Kingdom.

== Records ==
Most successful horse since 1946 (2 wins):

- The Callant – 1956, 1957
- Whinstone Hill – 1958, 1960
- College Master – 1961, 1962
- Double Silk – 1993, 1994
- Fantus – 1995, 1997
- Earthmover – 1998, 2004
- Salsify – 2012, 2013
- On The Fringe – 2015, 2016
- Pacha du Polder – 2017, 2018

Leading jockey since 1946 (3 wins):

- Colman Sweeney – Sleeping Night (2005), Salsify (2012, 2013),

Leading trainer since 1946 (4 wins):

- Richard Barber – Rushing Wild (1992), Fantus (1995, 1997), Earthmover (1998)
- Paul Nicholls – Earthmover (2004), Sleeping Night (2005), Pacha du Polder (2017, 2018)

== Winners since 1946 ==
- All amateur jockeys except in 2021.

Year	Winner	Age	Jockey	Trainer
1946	Iloilo	9	Harry Freeman-Jackson	Harry Freeman-Jackson
1947	Lucky Purchase	9	John Nichols	Sidney Banks
1948	State Control	8	Harry Llewellyn	Harry Llewellyn
	no race 1949 (Note: The race was abandoned in 1949 due to frost, and in 1955 due to snow)
1950	Greenwood	13	John Stuart-Evans	J. T. Evans
1951	Halloween	6	Dickie Smalley	Bill Wightman
1952	Parasol II	7	Ivor Kerwood	A. Walton
1953	Dunboy II (DH)	9	Charlie Scott	P. Bruce
1953	Merry (DH)	13	Gay Kindersley	Alec Kerr
1954	Happymint	9	Danny Moralee	Stewart Wight
	no race 1955
1956	The Callant	8	John Scott-Aiton	Stewart Wight
1957	The Callant	9	John Scott-Aiton	Stewart Wight
1958	Whinstone Hill	9	Bobby Brewis	Bobby Brewis
1959	Some Baby	10	John Thorne	Tim Rootes
1960	Whinstone Hill	11	Bobby Brewis	Bobby Brewis
1961	College Master	11	Laurie Morgan	Laurie Morgan
1962	College Master	12	Laurie Morgan	Laurie Morgan
1963	Grand Morn II	9	R. Bloomfield	G. Shepheard
1964	Freddie	7	Alan Mactaggart	Reg Tweedie
1965	Woodside Terrace	12	Dick Woodhouse	Dick Woodhouse
1966	Straight Lady	10	Richard Shepherd	William Shepherd
1967	Mulbarton	11	Nick Gaselee	Ian Pattullo
1968	Bright Beach	8	Charlie Macmillan	Geordie Dun
1969	Queens Guide	8	G. Wade	Willie Wade
1970	Highworth	11	Dick Woodhouse	Dick Woodhouse
1971	Hope Again	9	Richard Smith	Denis Windel
1972	Credit Call	8	Chris Collins	Arthur Stephenson
1973	Bullocks Horn	10	Lord Oaksey	Bob Turnell
1974	Corrie Burn	8	Ian Williams	George Fairbairn
1975	Real Rascal	12	George Hyatt	Barbara Surman
1976	False Note	10	Bryan Smart	John Horton
1977	Long Lane	9	Richard Shepherd	Richard Shepherd
1978	Timmie's Battle	7	Peter Greenall	Arthur Stephenson
1979	Spartan Missile	7	John Thorne	John Thorne
1980	Rolls Rambler	9	Oliver Sherwood	Fred Winter
1981	Grittar	8	Dick Saunders	Frank Gilman
1982	The Drunken Duck	9	Brod Munro-Wilson	Brod Munro-Wilson
1983	Eliogarty	8	Caroline Beasley	Barry Kelly
1984	Venture to Cognac	11	Oliver Sherwood	Fred Winter
1985	Elmboy	7	Alan Hill	Norman Mawle
1986	Attitude Adjuster	6	Ted Walsh	Mouse Morris
1987	Observe	11	Charlie Brooks	Fred Winter
1988	Certain Light	10	Paul Hacking	Jean Campbell
1989	Three Counties	12	Katie Rimell	Mercy Rimell
1990	Call Collect	9	Ray Martin	John Parkes
1991	Lovely Citizen	8	Willie O'Sullivan	Eugene M. O'Sullivan
1992	Rushing Wild	7	Justin Farthing	Richard Barber
1993	Double Silk	9	Ron Treloggen	Reg Wilkins
1994	Double Silk	10	Ron Treloggen	Reg Wilkins
1995	Fantus	8	Polly Curling	Richard Barber
1996	Elegant Lord	8	Enda Bolger	Enda Bolger
1997	Fantus	10	Tim Mitchell	Richard Barber
1998	Earthmover	7	Joe Tizzard	Richard Barber
1999	Castle Mane	7	Ben Pollock	Caroline Bailey
2000	Cavalero	11	Alex Charles-Jones	John Manners
	no race 2001 (Note: The 2001 running was cancelled because of a foot-and-mouth crisis)
2002	Last Option	10	Fiona Needham	Robin Tate
2003	Kingscliff	6	Richard Young	Sally Alner
2004	Earthmover	13	Rilly Goschen	Paul Nicholls
2005	Sleeping Night	9	Colman Sweeney	Paul Nicholls
2006	Whyso Mayo	9	Damien Murphy	Raymond Hurley
2007	Drombeag	9	J. T. McNamara	Jonjo O'Neill
2008	Amicelli	9	Oliver Greenall	Cherry Coward
2009	Cappa Bleu	7	Richard Burton	Sheila Crow
2010	Baby Run	10	Sam Twiston-Davies	Nigel Twiston-Davies
2011	Zemsky	8	Derek O'Connor	Ian Ferguson
2012	Salsify	7	Colman Sweeney	Roger Sweeney
2013	Salsify	8	Colman Sweeney	Roger Sweeney
2014	Tammys Hill	9	James Smyth	Liam Lennon
2015	On The Fringe	10	Nina Carberry	Enda Bolger
2016	On The Fringe	11	Nina Carberry	Enda Bolger
2017	Pacha Du Polder	10	Bryony Frost	Paul Nicholls
2018	Pacha Du Polder	11	Harriet Tucker	Paul Nicholls
2019	Hazel Hill	11	Alex Edwards	Philip Rowley
2020	It Came to Pass	10	Maxine O'Sullivan	Eugene O'Sullivan
2021	Porlock Bay	10	Lorcan Williams	Will Biddick
2022	Billaway	10	Patrick Mullins	Willie Mullins
2023	Premier Magic	10	Bradley Gibbs	Bradley Gibbs
2024	Sine Nomine	8	John Dawson	Fiona Needham
2025	Wonderwall	9	Rob James	Sam Curling
2026	Barton Snow	9	Henry Crow	Joe O'Shea

== See also ==
- Horse racing in Great Britain
- List of British National Hunt races
- Recurring sporting events established in 1904 – this race is included under the title Foxhunter Chase.
