= Charlie Pierce (footballer) =

Australian rules footballer

Personal information
- Full name: Charles Thomas Pierce
- Born: 3 February 1917; Hawthorn, Victoria
- Died: 30 August 2007 (aged 90)
- Height: 182 cm (6 ft 0 in)
- Weight: 72 kg (159 lb)

Playing career^{1}
Years	Club	Games (Goals)
1937–1939	Hawthorn	17 (13)
1939	North Melbourne	1 (0)
Total		18 (13)
- ^{1} Playing statistics correct to the end of 1939.

Charles Thomas Pierce (3 February 1917 – 30 August 2007) was an Australian rules footballer who played with Hawthorn and North Melbourne in the Victorian Football League (VFL).

== 1937 Best First-Year Players ==
In September 1937, The Argus selected Pierce in its team of 1937's first-year players.

		Best First-Year Players (1937)	
Backs	Bernie Treweek (Fitzroy)	Reg Henderson (Richmond)	Lawrence Morgan (Fitzroy)
H/Backs	Gordon Waters (Hawthorn)	Bill Cahill (Essendon)	Eddie Morcom (North Melbourne)
Centre Line	Ted Buckley (Melbourne)	George Bates (Richmond)	Jack Kelly (St Kilda)
H/Forwards	Col Williamson (St Kilda)	Ray Watts (Essendon)	Don Dilks (Footscray)
Forwards	Lou Sleeth (Richmond)	Sel Murray (North Melbourne)	Charlie Pierce (Hawthorn)
Rucks/Rover	Reg Garvin (St Kilda)	Sandy Patterson (South Melbourne)	Des Fothergill (Collingwood)
Second Ruck	Lawrence Morgan	Col Williamson	Lou Sleeth
