= George Coward =

Australian rules footballer

Personal information
- Full name: George Coward
- Born: 14 May 1915
- Died: 27 April 2009 (aged 93)
- Original team: St Paul's
- Height: 170 cm (5 ft 7 in)
- Weight: 76 kg (168 lb)

Playing career^{1}
Years	Club	Games (Goals)
1935–1937	Essendon	7 (0)
1939–1941	North Melbourne	13 (1)
Total		20 (1)
- ^{1} Playing statistics correct to the end of 1941.

George Coward (14 May 1915 – 27 April 2009) was an Australian rules footballer who played with Essendon and North Melbourne in the Victorian Football League (VFL).
