= Leo Maynes =

Australian rules footballer

Personal information
- Full name: Leo Anthony Maynes
- Born: 5 June 1911; Carlton, Victoria
- Died: 4 August 1998 (aged 87)
- Original team: Brunswick
- Height: 183 cm (6 ft 0 in)
- Weight: 83 kg (183 lb)
- Position: Back pocket

Playing career^{1}
Years	Club	Games (Goals)
1931–35	Brunswick (VFA)	62 (19)
1935–37	Fitzroy	15 (4)
1937–40	Essendon	36 (7)
- ^{1} Playing statistics correct to the end of 1940.

Leo Anthony Maynes (5 June 1911 – 4 August 1998) was an Australian rules footballer who played with Fitzroy and Essendon in the Victorian Football League (VFL).

From 1942 to 1945 he served in the Australian Army during World War II, including stints in Borneo and New Guinea.
