= Lawrence Morgan =

Australian sportsman (1915–1997)

Personal information
- Full name: Lawrence Robert Morgan
- Born: 5 February 1915
- Died: 15 August 1997 (aged 82)
- Original team: Yarrawonga
- Height: 183 cm (6 ft 0 in)
- Weight: 84 kg (185 lb)

Playing career^{1}
Years	Club	Games (Goals)
1937–39	Fitzroy	34 (14)
- ^{1} Playing statistics correct to the end of 1939.

Olympic medal record

Equestrian
Gold medal – first place	1960 Rome	Eventing
Gold medal – first place	1960 Rome	Team eventing

Lawrence Robert Morgan (5 February 1915 – 15 August 1997) was an Australian sportsman who is the only person to play VFL/AFL football and win an Olympic gold medal. He played his Australian rules football with Fitzroy during the late 1930s and won two gold medals in equestrian at the 1960 Summer Olympics in Rome.

Morgan was born in the country and, as a child, raced horses over tree branches with his friend, fellow Olympic equestrian competitor Bill Roycroft. When he came to Fitzroy in 1937 he played in the same side as the great Haydn Bunton. He spent two further seasons at Fitzroy, both under coach Gordon Rattray, before leaving.

Morgan returned to the sporting scene in 1960, at the age of 45, when he competed for the Australian equestrian team at the Rome Olympics. Riding his horse 'Salad Days', Morgan won the Gold Medal ahead of countryman Neale Lavis in the Individual Three-Day Event to become the first Australian to win an equestrian gold medal. The former VFL player then teamed up with Lavis and Bill Roycroft to win Gold in the Team Event, best remembered for Roycroft's heroics in riding despite suffering concussion and severe injuries from a previous fall.

Although the Australian Olympic team consisted of big names like Herb Elliott, Dawn Fraser and Murray Rose, Morgan was the only dual gold medalist.

Morgan's biography, entitled Too Tough To Lose, was completed by his son Warwick Morgan, himself an accomplished horseman, and published in 2012 by Forty Degrees South Publishing (see External Links).

== 1937 Best First-Year Players ==
In September 1937, The Argus selected Morgan in its team of 1937's first-year players.

		Best First-Year Players (1937)	
Backs	Bernie Treweek (Fitzroy)	Reg Henderson (Richmond)	Lawrence Morgan (Fitzroy)
H/Backs	Gordon Waters (Hawthorn)	Bill Cahill (Essendon)	Eddie Morcom (North Melbourne)
Centre Line	Ted Buckley (Melbourne)	George Bates (Richmond)	Jack Kelly (St Kilda)
H/Forwards	Col Williamson (St Kilda)	Ray Watts (Essendon)	Don Dilks (Footscray)
Forwards	Lou Sleeth (Richmond)	Sel Murray (North Melbourne)	Charlie Pierce (Hawthorn)
Rucks/Rover	Reg Garvin (St Kilda)	Sandy Patterson (South Melbourne)	Des Fothergill (Collingwood)
Second Ruck	Lawrence Morgan	Col Williamson	Lou Sleeth
