= National Hunt racing =

Sport of horse racing in Western Europe

National Hunt racing, also known as jump racing, is a form of horse racing particular to many European countries, including France, Great Britain and Ireland. Jump racing requires horses to jump over fences and ditches.

In the UK, National Hunt racing is divided into two major distinct branches: hurdling and steeplechase, as well as flat races called "bumpers". Hurdling involves horses jumping over hurdles, while steeplechase involves the horses jumping over a variety of different obstacles that include fences, water jumps or an open ditch. The biggest National Hunt events of the year in the UK are the Grand National and the Cheltenham Gold Cup.

== Overview ==
The National Hunt season primarily occurs during the winter months when softer ground conditions make jumping safer for horses. The horses are significantly cheaper than sport horses for other equestrian sports, the reason being the majority are geldings and have no breeding value.

Jump Racing primarily takes place in France, Great Britain and Ireland, with some events also taking place in Australia, Canada and the United States. In Ireland, National Hunt racing receives much higher attendances than flat racing, while in Great Britain, it is more balanced.

National Hunt horses are often bred for jumping, while others are former flat horses but they do not have to be Thoroughbreds: many French-bred jumpers are Selle Français or AQPS. Many horses begin their racing careers in amateur point-to-pointing where they compete over steeplechase races of three miles (4.8 km).

Two of the biggest events of the National Hunt calendar are the Cheltenham Festival meeting and the Grand National meeting. The Cheltenham Festival is held at Cheltenham Racecourse over four days in the second week of March. It features multiple grade one races, culminating on Friday in the Cheltenham Gold Cup, one of the most prestigious Chase races in the world. The 2025 edition of the Cheltenham festival included 14 Grade 1 races in the schedule.The Grand National meeting is held at Aintree over three days every April..

Other important festivals are: the Galway Races – a mixed (NH and flat) meeting in Ireland; Punchestown Festival – the Irish equivalent of the Cheltenham Festival; The Tingle Creek at Sandown Park Racecourse; the Scottish Grand National at Ayr Racecourse; the King George VI Chase at Kempton Park Racecourse; the Welsh National at Chepstow Racecourse; and the Irish National at Fairyhouse Racecourse.

== History ==
National Hunt racing originated in Ireland, particularly in the southern counties. Early races were mainly two-horse contests known as "pounding races" which became popular in the early 18th century. These involved long trips across country where horses were required to jump whatever obstacles the landscape threw in their way.

The first recorded race of this nature is traditionally said to have taken place between the towns of Buttevant and Doneraile in the north of County Cork in 1752. The distance of the race was 4.5 miles (7.2 km). The start and finish were marked by the church steeple in each town, hence the term "steeplechase".

The first use of the term steeplechase on an official racecard was in Ireland in the early 19th century. The 'official' first running of the Grand National, held annually at Aintree in England, took place in 1839 and was won by an Irish horse, Lottery. The "National", as it is known, was run over 4.5 miles (7.2 km), but since 2013 is run over 4.3 miles (6.9 km).

Organizing steeple chasing in Britain, began with annual events being staged cross country over a number of fields, hedges and brooks, the earliest most notable of these being the St Albans Steeplechase (first run in 1830). For some years, there was no regulation of steeplechasing.

A breakthrough came in the 1860s with the formation of the National Hunt Committee, and the running of the National Hunt Steeplechase. This steeplechase would form part of an annual race-meeting staged at a different track each year. The 'National Hunt Meeting' established itself in the racing calendar, in turn moving around such courses as Sandown, New market, Derby, Liverpool, Hurst Park, Lincoln, Leicester and many others.

In 1904 and 1905, Cheltenham hosted the meeting, and although Warwick was awarded it for five years after that, it then returned to Cheltenham which became the permanent home of the fixture. Further prestigious races were added to the card during the 1920s, such as the Cheltenham Gold Cup and Champion Hurdle.

As steeple chasing entered its modern era, the Cheltenham Festival became a major part of the season, providing a series of championship races.

With the introduction of sponsorship (starting with the Whitbread Gold Cup in 1957), a whole host of other important races have been added to the National Hunt racing season.

=== The 2000s ===
Given the sport's origins, Irish-bred and trained horses remained a force in national hunt racing during the 2000s. In 2005 and 2006, Irish-trained horses captured the three main prizes at Cheltenham and won the Grand National. Best Mate who captured the Cheltenham Gold Cup three successive times between 2002 and 2004, was Irish-bred, but trained and owned in England.

French-bred horses have also come to the forefront with horses such as Master Minded becoming the highest rated horse in Britain after winning the Queen Mother Champion Chase. Kauto Star who won the Gold Cup in 2007, 2009 and was second in 2008 is also French bred.

== Types of race ==
- Chase –
  - run over distances of 2–4 1/2 miles (3–7 km).
  - over obstacles called fences that are a minimum of 4 1/2 feet (1.4 m) high.
- Hurdling –
  - run over distances of 2–3 1/2 miles (3–5.5 km).
  - over obstacles called hurdles that are a minimum of 3 1/2 feet (1.1 m) high.
- National Hunt Flat race (NH Flat) –
  - are flat races for horses that have not yet competed either in flat racing or over obstacles, often called 'bumper' races.
  - run over distances of 1 1/2–2 1/2 miles (2.5–4 km).

== Grades and classes ==
Races are graded depending on their health and mental status. The most prestigious are Grade 1, then Grade 2, Grade 3, Listed, Handicaps, to Bumpers the least prestigious. The more highly graded races attract more prize money and better horses. (In flat racing the more prestigious races are Group 1, 2, and 3, then Listed).

All National Hunt races are also classified in classes 1-7 (class 1 best). Graded and listed races are class 1.

See the list of Grade 1-3 National Hunt races and the list of Group 1-3 Flat races.

== Major National Hunt festivals ==
=== Cheltenham ===
Cheltenham Racecourse, in the Cotswolds, hosts the Cheltenham Festival in the third week of March each year, as well as other important fixtures during the NH calendar.

The highlight of the Cheltenham Festival is the Gold Cup. All races run at Cheltenham finish with a long uphill run-in in front of the stands. The Gold Cup is a Grade 1 race, run over a distance of 3 miles 2 1/2 furlongs (5.3 km). All horses carry the same weight in the Gold Cup. Famous winners of the Gold Cup include Dawn Run (mare, ridden by Jonjo O'Neill), Arkle, Golden Miller, Best Mate, Desert Orchid & Kauto Star.

=== Grand National ===
The highest profile National Hunt race is the Grand National, run at Aintree in April each year. The race is a different sort of contest from the Gold Cup: it is a Grade 3 race, it is run over a distance of more than 4 miles (6.4 km), there are up to 34 runners, the course at Aintree is essentially flat, and the horses are handicapped (the best horses carry the most weight). Perhaps the most fundamental difference is that the Grand National fences are far bigger than the fences at Cheltenham and a number of fences incorporate significant drops. The best-known fence is Becher's Brook which is 5 ft (1.5 m) high but has a 7 ft (2 m) drop on landing and is often regarded as the biggest challenge on the course.

Winners of the Grand National include Red Rum (won 3 times:1973, 1974, 1977), runner up twice (1975, 1976)); Mr Frisk (1990, the last winner to date to be ridden by an amateur jockey and still holds the record for the fastest time); Aldaniti (1981, ridden by Bob Champion shortly after he had recovered from cancer. His story was made into a film); and Foinavon (1967, won at odds of 100/1 after a mêlée at the 23rd fence resulted in the majority of the field falling or refusing. Foinavon was far enough behind at that point to avoid the confusion and ran on to win by 20 lengths. The fence where the mêlée occurred is now named "Foinavon Fence").

=== Other National Hunt races ===
Other NH races of note include the King George VI Chase, run at Kempton Park on 26 December and the Hennessy Gold Cup run at Newbury at the end of November.

== Hunter chase racing ==
Hunter chases take place at national hunt racecourses but are only open to horses that have hunter certificates. Hunter certificates are issued to horses that have hunted for at least four days in the season before racing starts in January. In addition, the jockey must be an amateur who has obtained a certificate from the hunt secretary.

Unlike point-to-points, licensed trainers as well as amateur trainers may have runners in Hunter Chases. This often causes controversy when big name trainers run former Grade 1 horses in Hunter Chases as amateur trainers feel they are unable to compete. New rules which took effect in 2009, will prevent horses which have finished in the first 3 of a Grade 1 or 2 chase in the previous season from taking part.

The two biggest Hunter Chases are the Aintree Fox Hunters' Chase and Cheltenham Foxhunter Chase. The Aintree Fox Hunters' is run as the feature race on the first day of the Grand National meeting over one circuit of the Grand National course. This gives amateur riders the chance to jump these famous fences before the professionals.

The Cheltenham Foxhunter is run after the Gold Cup over the same distance and is often referred to as the amateur Gold Cup.

== Point to point racing ==
"Point to Point" racing is steeplechase racing for amateurs.

== Popular culture ==
National Hunt racing is the setting for Jilly Cooper's 2010 novel Jump!.

== See also ==
- Steeplechase for this style of horse racing more generically ('steeplechase' being the term used for similar styles of racing in the USA).
