= 1937 VFL season =

41st season of the Victorian Football League (VFL)

1937 VFL premiership season
- Geelong captain-coach Reg Hickey
- Teams: 12
- Premiers: Geelong; 3rd premiership
- Minor premiers: Geelong; 5th minor premiership
- Brownlow Medallist: Dick Reynolds (Essendon)
- Leading goalkicker medallist: Dick Harris (Carlton)
- Matches played: 112
- Highest: 88,540

The 1937 VFL season was the 41st season of the Victorian Football League (VFL), the highest level senior Australian rules football competition in Victoria. The season featured twelve clubs, ran from 24 April until 25 September, and comprised an 18-game home-and-away season followed by a finals series featuring the top four clubs.

The premiership was won by the Geelong Football Club for the third time, after it defeated Collingwood by 32 points in the 1937 VFL Grand Final.

== Background ==
In 1937, the VFL competition consisted of twelve teams of 18 on-the-field players each, plus one substitute player, known as the 19th man. A player could be substituted for any reason; however, once substituted, a player could not return to the field of play under any circumstances.

Teams played each other in a home-and-away season of 18 rounds; matches 12 to 18 were the "home-and-way reverse" of matches 1 to 7.

Once the 18 round home-and-away season had finished, the 1937 VFL Premiers were determined by the specific format and conventions of the Page–McIntyre system.

== Home-and-away season ==
=== Round 1 ===
| Home team | Home team score | Away team | Away team score | Venue | Crowd | Date |
|---|---|---|---|---|---|---|
| Melbourne | 14.8 (92) | Richmond | 9.12 (66) | MCG | 19,726 | 24 April 1937 |
| Collingwood | 15.16 (106) | Geelong | 13.12 (90) | Victoria Park | 21,000 | 24 April 1937 |
| Carlton | 18.21 (129) | South Melbourne | 7.17 (59) | Princes Park | 33,000 | 24 April 1937 |
| North Melbourne | 9.22 (76) | Hawthorn | 11.12 (78) | Arden Street Oval | 11,000 | 24 April 1937 |
| St Kilda | 12.16 (88) | Fitzroy | 10.21 (81) | Junction Oval | 23,000 | 24 April 1937 |
| Footscray | 9.17 (71) | Essendon | 9.13 (67) | Western Oval | 18,000 | 24 April 1937 |

=== Round 2 ===
| Home team | Home team score | Away team | Away team score | Venue | Crowd | Date |
|---|---|---|---|---|---|---|
| Hawthorn | 14.15 (99) | St Kilda | 15.22 (112) | Glenferrie Oval | 16,000 | 1 May 1937 |
| Fitzroy | 9.11 (65) | North Melbourne | 10.7 (67) | Brunswick Street Oval | 16,000 | 1 May 1937 |
| Essendon | 13.7 (85) | Melbourne | 25.20 (170) | Windy Hill | 14,000 | 1 May 1937 |
| Richmond | 17.15 (117) | Footscray | 12.11 (83) | Punt Road Oval | 16,000 | 1 May 1937 |
| South Melbourne | 11.19 (85) | Collingwood | 20.20 (140) | Lake Oval | 25,000 | 1 May 1937 |
| Geelong | 8.12 (60) | Carlton | 6.13 (49) | Corio Oval | 13,600 | 1 May 1937 |

=== Round 3 ===
| Home team | Home team score | Away team | Away team score | Venue | Crowd | Date |
|---|---|---|---|---|---|---|
| Footscray | 6.10 (46) | St Kilda | 7.9 (51) | Western Oval | 13,000 | 8 May 1937 |
| Fitzroy | 15.15 (105) | Hawthorn | 9.15 (69) | Brunswick Street Oval | 9,000 | 8 May 1937 |
| Essendon | 18.13 (121) | Geelong | 14.20 (104) | Windy Hill | 11,000 | 8 May 1937 |
| South Melbourne | 11.15 (81) | Richmond | 11.15 (81) | Lake Oval | 16,000 | 8 May 1937 |
| North Melbourne | 3.16 (34) | Collingwood | 9.14 (68) | Arden Street Oval | 11,000 | 8 May 1937 |
| Melbourne | 15.17 (107) | Carlton | 10.11 (71) | MCG | 31,831 | 8 May 1937 |

=== Round 4 ===
| Home team | Home team score | Away team | Away team score | Venue | Crowd | Date |
|---|---|---|---|---|---|---|
| Geelong | 12.20 (92) | South Melbourne | 7.11 (53) | Corio Oval | 11,500 | 15 May 1937 |
| Collingwood | 16.14 (110) | Footscray | 11.11 (77) | Victoria Park | 14,500 | 15 May 1937 |
| Carlton | 10.12 (72) | North Melbourne | 10.14 (74) | Princes Park | 14,000 | 15 May 1937 |
| St Kilda | 12.18 (90) | Melbourne | 12.23 (95) | Junction Oval | 25,000 | 15 May 1937 |
| Richmond | 17.10 (112) | Fitzroy | 12.12 (84) | Punt Road Oval | 18,000 | 15 May 1937 |
| Hawthorn | 11.15 (81) | Essendon | 16.13 (109) | Glenferrie Oval | 10,000 | 15 May 1937 |

=== Round 5 ===
| Home team | Home team score | Away team | Away team score | Venue | Crowd | Date |
|---|---|---|---|---|---|---|
| Geelong | 21.23 (149) | Hawthorn | 7.11 (53) | Corio Oval | 7,300 | 22 May 1937 |
| Footscray | 18.23 (131) | North Melbourne | 14.4 (88) | Western Oval | 14,000 | 22 May 1937 |
| Fitzroy | 11.16 (82) | South Melbourne | 7.18 (60) | Brunswick Street Oval | 14,000 | 22 May 1937 |
| Essendon | 8.15 (63) | Richmond | 17.13 (115) | Windy Hill | 15,000 | 22 May 1937 |
| Melbourne | 13.23 (101) | Collingwood | 11.10 (76) | MCG | 44,623 | 22 May 1937 |
| St Kilda | 12.19 (91) | Carlton | 13.16 (94) | Junction Oval | 18,000 | 22 May 1937 |

=== Round 6 ===
| Home team | Home team score | Away team | Away team score | Venue | Crowd | Date |
|---|---|---|---|---|---|---|
| North Melbourne | 13.8 (86) | St Kilda | 15.13 (103) | Arden Street Oval | 15,000 | 29 May 1937 |
| Footscray | 8.8 (56) | Melbourne | 11.12 (78) | Western Oval | 17,000 | 29 May 1937 |
| South Melbourne | 15.11 (101) | Hawthorn | 13.20 (98) | Lake Oval | 10,000 | 29 May 1937 |
| Richmond | 15.19 (109) | Geelong | 12.6 (78) | Punt Road Oval | 17,000 | 29 May 1937 |
| Fitzroy | 11.9 (75) | Essendon | 8.18 (66) | Brunswick Street Oval | 14,000 | 29 May 1937 |
| Collingwood | 11.16 (82) | Carlton | 8.7 (55) | Victoria Park | 24,000 | 29 May 1937 |

=== Round 7 ===
| Home team | Home team score | Away team | Away team score | Venue | Crowd | Date |
|---|---|---|---|---|---|---|
| Melbourne | 25.16 (166) | North Melbourne | 5.14 (44) | MCG | 12,906 | 5 June 1937 |
| Hawthorn | 9.6 (60) | Richmond | 8.10 (58) | Glenferrie Oval | 10,000 | 5 June 1937 |
| Essendon | 16.12 (108) | South Melbourne | 11.10 (76) | Windy Hill | 12,000 | 5 June 1937 |
| Carlton | 19.12 (126) | Footscray | 9.10 (64) | Princes Park | 12,500 | 5 June 1937 |
| Geelong | 16.19 (115) | Fitzroy | 10.10 (70) | Corio Oval | 8,000 | 5 June 1937 |
| St Kilda | 12.15 (87) | Collingwood | 9.15 (69) | Junction Oval | 28,000 | 5 June 1937 |

=== Round 8 ===
| Home team | Home team score | Away team | Away team score | Venue | Crowd | Date |
|---|---|---|---|---|---|---|
| Geelong | 16.13 (109) | St Kilda | 11.15 (81) | Corio Oval | 12,600 | 12 June 1937 |
| Essendon | 13.11 (89) | Collingwood | 19.14 (128) | Windy Hill | 13,000 | 12 June 1937 |
| Richmond | 14.24 (108) | Carlton | 13.19 (97) | Punt Road Oval | 27,000 | 12 June 1937 |
| Hawthorn | 12.10 (82) | Melbourne | 15.15 (105) | Glenferrie Oval | 18,000 | 14 June 1937 |
| Fitzroy | 14.15 (99) | Footscray | 8.14 (62) | Brunswick Street Oval | 20,000 | 14 June 1937 |
| South Melbourne | 16.18 (114) | North Melbourne | 10.10 (70) | Lake Oval | 16,000 | 14 June 1937 |

=== Round 9 ===
| Home team | Home team score | Away team | Away team score | Venue | Crowd | Date |
|---|---|---|---|---|---|---|
| North Melbourne | 12.16 (88) | Richmond | 11.11 (77) | Arden Street Oval | 10,000 | 19 June 1937 |
| Footscray | 10.8 (68) | South Melbourne | 18.11 (119) | Western Oval | 12,000 | 19 June 1937 |
| Collingwood | 16.9 (105) | Fitzroy | 12.12 (84) | Victoria Park | 18,000 | 19 June 1937 |
| Carlton | 15.24 (114) | Hawthorn | 8.11 (59) | Princes Park | 11,000 | 19 June 1937 |
| Melbourne | 9.17 (71) | Geelong | 15.14 (104) | MCG | 29,376 | 19 June 1937 |
| St Kilda | 13.19 (97) | Essendon | 11.14 (80) | Junction Oval | 14,000 | 19 June 1937 |

=== Round 10 ===
| Home team | Home team score | Away team | Away team score | Venue | Crowd | Date |
|---|---|---|---|---|---|---|
| Geelong | 18.16 (124) | North Melbourne | 4.14 (38) | Corio Oval | 9,000 | 26 June 1937 |
| Fitzroy | 7.8 (50) | Melbourne | 11.23 (89) | Brunswick Street Oval | 16,000 | 26 June 1937 |
| South Melbourne | 14.18 (102) | St Kilda | 8.12 (60) | Lake Oval | 22,000 | 26 June 1937 |
| Hawthorn | 15.16 (106) | Footscray | 14.15 (99) | Glenferrie Oval | 7,500 | 26 June 1937 |
| Richmond | 12.8 (80) | Collingwood | 14.9 (93) | Punt Road Oval | 22,000 | 26 June 1937 |
| Essendon | 13.18 (96) | Carlton | 15.18 (108) | Windy Hill | 14,000 | 26 June 1937 |

=== Round 11 ===
| Home team | Home team score | Away team | Away team score | Venue | Crowd | Date |
|---|---|---|---|---|---|---|
| Melbourne | 13.10 (88) | South Melbourne | 11.16 (82) | MCG | 20,638 | 3 July 1937 |
| Footscray | 11.8 (74) | Geelong | 13.15 (93) | Western Oval | 5,500 | 3 July 1937 |
| Collingwood | 13.23 (101) | Hawthorn | 6.13 (49) | Victoria Park | 5,800 | 3 July 1937 |
| Carlton | 13.11 (89) | Fitzroy | 8.19 (67) | Princes Park | 8,000 | 3 July 1937 |
| St Kilda | 16.6 (102) | Richmond | 10.13 (73) | Junction Oval | 11,000 | 3 July 1937 |
| North Melbourne | 11.11 (77) | Essendon | 11.22 (88) | Arden Street Oval | 6,000 | 3 July 1937 |

=== Round 12 ===
| Home team | Home team score | Away team | Away team score | Venue | Crowd | Date |
|---|---|---|---|---|---|---|
| Hawthorn | 9.15 (69) | North Melbourne | 6.15 (51) | Glenferrie Oval | 5,000 | 10 July 1937 |
| Fitzroy | 10.19 (79) | St Kilda | 5.11 (41) | Brunswick Street Oval | 14,000 | 10 July 1937 |
| Essendon | 9.13 (67) | Footscray | 11.11 (77) | Windy Hill | 11,000 | 10 July 1937 |
| Richmond | 15.12 (102) | Melbourne | 13.10 (88) | Punt Road Oval | 16,000 | 10 July 1937 |
| Geelong | 13.16 (94) | Collingwood | 10.11 (71) | Corio Oval | 16,000 | 10 July 1937 |
| South Melbourne | 13.9 (87) | Carlton | 7.14 (56) | Lake Oval | 22,000 | 10 July 1937 |

=== Round 13 ===
| Home team | Home team score | Away team | Away team score | Venue | Crowd | Date |
|---|---|---|---|---|---|---|
| Footscray | 11.9 (75) | Richmond | 12.6 (78) | Western Oval | 10,000 | 17 July 1937 |
| Collingwood | 18.19 (127) | South Melbourne | 15.14 (104) | Victoria Park | 22,000 | 17 July 1937 |
| Carlton | 9.13 (67) | Geelong | 13.14 (92) | Princes Park | 15,000 | 17 July 1937 |
| St Kilda | 11.15 (81) | Hawthorn | 9.8 (62) | Junction Oval | 9,000 | 17 July 1937 |
| North Melbourne | 5.17 (47) | Fitzroy | 9.14 (68) | Arden Street Oval | 8,000 | 17 July 1937 |
| Melbourne | 11.13 (79) | Essendon | 8.15 (63) | MCG | 11,449 | 17 July 1937 |

=== Round 14 ===
| Home team | Home team score | Away team | Away team score | Venue | Crowd | Date |
|---|---|---|---|---|---|---|
| Richmond | 16.23 (119) | South Melbourne | 13.11 (89) | Punt Road Oval | 18,000 | 24 July 1937 |
| Collingwood | 24.20 (164) | North Melbourne | 7.9 (51) | Victoria Park | 9,000 | 24 July 1937 |
| Carlton | 16.24 (120) | Melbourne | 16.8 (104) | Princes Park | 16,000 | 24 July 1937 |
| St Kilda | 17.10 (112) | Footscray | 13.15 (93) | Junction Oval | 12,000 | 24 July 1937 |
| Hawthorn | 10.11 (71) | Fitzroy | 6.13 (49) | Glenferrie Oval | 7,500 | 24 July 1937 |
| Geelong | 13.22 (100) | Essendon | 9.12 (66) | Corio Oval | 8,000 | 24 July 1937 |

=== Round 15 ===
| Home team | Home team score | Away team | Away team score | Venue | Crowd | Date |
|---|---|---|---|---|---|---|
| Melbourne | 18.16 (124) | St Kilda | 11.18 (84) | MCG | 25,904 | 31 July 1937 |
| Fitzroy | 11.13 (79) | Richmond | 15.13 (103) | Brunswick Street Oval | 14,000 | 31 July 1937 |
| Essendon | 11.13 (79) | Hawthorn | 13.14 (92) | Windy Hill | 6,000 | 31 July 1937 |
| South Melbourne | 13.10 (88) | Geelong | 16.11 (107) | Lake Oval | 12,000 | 31 July 1937 |
| Footscray | 10.14 (74) | Collingwood | 19.12 (126) | Western Oval | 10,000 | 31 July 1937 |
| North Melbourne | 10.11 (71) | Carlton | 14.8 (92) | Arden Street Oval | 11,000 | 31 July 1937 |

=== Round 16 ===
| Home team | Home team score | Away team | Away team score | Venue | Crowd | Date |
|---|---|---|---|---|---|---|
| North Melbourne | 8.16 (64) | Footscray | 13.13 (91) | Arden Street Oval | 8,000 | 7 August 1937 |
| South Melbourne | 10.16 (76) | Fitzroy | 15.8 (98) | Lake Oval | 10,000 | 7 August 1937 |
| Richmond | 13.15 (93) | Essendon | 12.19 (91) | Punt Road Oval | 14,000 | 7 August 1937 |
| Collingwood | 21.16 (142) | Melbourne | 22.21 (153) | Victoria Park | 21,000 | 14 August 1937 |
| Carlton | 12.16 (88) | St Kilda | 11.12 (78) | Princes Park | 12,000 | 14 August 1937 |
| Hawthorn | 13.13 (91) | Geelong | 17.12 (114) | Glenferrie Oval | 6,000 | 14 August 1937 |

=== Round 17 ===
| Home team | Home team score | Away team | Away team score | Venue | Crowd | Date |
|---|---|---|---|---|---|---|
| Hawthorn | 15.12 (102) | South Melbourne | 10.15 (75) | Glenferrie Oval | 6,000 | 21 August 1937 |
| Geelong | 14.6 (90) | Richmond | 8.11 (59) | Corio Oval | 11,500 | 21 August 1937 |
| Essendon | 17.17 (119) | Fitzroy | 10.10 (70) | Windy Hill | 7,000 | 21 August 1937 |
| Carlton | 11.15 (81) | Collingwood | 9.17 (71) | Princes Park | 17,500 | 21 August 1937 |
| St Kilda | 22.19 (151) | North Melbourne | 11.5 (71) | Junction Oval | 6,000 | 21 August 1937 |
| Melbourne | 15.15 (105) | Footscray | 10.14 (74) | MCG | 9,553 | 21 August 1937 |

=== Round 18 ===
| Home team | Home team score | Away team | Away team score | Venue | Crowd | Date |
|---|---|---|---|---|---|---|
| Fitzroy | 12.9 (81) | Geelong | 16.13 (109) | Brunswick Street Oval | 10,000 | 28 August 1937 |
| Collingwood | 19.15 (129) | St Kilda | 13.13 (91) | Victoria Park | 11,500 | 28 August 1937 |
| North Melbourne | 13.13 (91) | Melbourne | 19.16 (130) | Arden Street Oval | 4,500 | 28 August 1937 |
| Richmond | 14.13 (97) | Hawthorn | 13.14 (92) | Punt Road Oval | 18,000 | 28 August 1937 |
| South Melbourne | 10.16 (76) | Essendon | 11.7 (73) | Lake Oval | 6,000 | 28 August 1937 |
| Footscray | 13.16 (94) | Carlton | 17.14 (116) | Western Oval | 8,000 | 28 August 1937 |

== Ladder ==
| (P) | Premiers |
| | Qualified for finals |

| # | Team | P | W | L | D | PF | PA | % | Pts |
|---|---|---|---|---|---|---|---|---|---|
| 1 | Geelong (P) | 18 | 15 | 3 | 0 | 1824 | 1348 | 135.3 | 60 |
| 2 | Melbourne | 18 | 15 | 3 | 0 | 1945 | 1482 | 131.2 | 60 |
| 3 | Collingwood | 18 | 13 | 5 | 0 | 1908 | 1479 | 129.0 | 52 |
| 4 | Richmond | 18 | 11 | 6 | 1 | 1647 | 1525 | 108.0 | 46 |
| 5 | Carlton | 18 | 11 | 7 | 0 | 1624 | 1464 | 110.9 | 44 |
| 6 | St Kilda | 18 | 10 | 8 | 0 | 1600 | 1580 | 101.3 | 40 |
| 7 | Fitzroy | 18 | 7 | 11 | 0 | 1386 | 1488 | 93.1 | 28 |
| 8 | Hawthorn | 18 | 7 | 11 | 0 | 1413 | 1675 | 84.4 | 28 |
| 9 | South Melbourne | 18 | 6 | 11 | 1 | 1527 | 1698 | 89.9 | 26 |
| 10 | Essendon | 18 | 5 | 13 | 0 | 1530 | 1689 | 90.6 | 20 |
| 11 | Footscray | 18 | 4 | 14 | 0 | 1409 | 1722 | 81.8 | 16 |
| 12 | North Melbourne | 18 | 3 | 15 | 0 | 1188 | 1851 | 64.2 | 12 |

Rules for classification: 1. premiership points; 2. percentage; 3. points for
Average score: 88.0
Source: AFL Tables

== Finals series ==
=== Semi-finals ===
| Home team | Score | Away team | Score | Venue | Crowd | Date |
|---|---|---|---|---|---|---|
| Collingwood | 18.12 (120) | Richmond | 10.9 (69) | MCG | 41,663 | 4 September |
| Geelong | 19.11 (125) | Melbourne | 16.17 (113) | MCG | 47,730 | 11 September |

=== Preliminary final ===
| Home team | Score | Away team | Score | Venue | Crowd | Date |
|---|---|---|---|---|---|---|
| Melbourne | 7.10 (52) | Collingwood | 16.11 (107) | MCG | 55,615 | 18 September |

== Season notes ==
- Still struggling to recover from the injury that kept him out of the 1936 grand final, Bob Pratt played only six matches (kicking 12 goals) for South Melbourne in the 1937 season.
- Having kicked Collingwood's only goal in the last quarter of the grand final, Gordon Coventry retired having played 306 senior VFL games and having scored 1299 goals.
  - In Round 15, Coventry became the first player to play 300 VFL games
- In Round 16, Collingwood and Melbourne set numerous records for high scoring:
  - a record match aggregate of 295 points, beating by two the record of Essendon and North Melbourne in 1934
  - highest losing score, beating Collingwood's own record against St Kilda in 1931 and still a club record for Collingwood

== Awards ==
- The 1937 VFL Premiership team was Geelong.
- The VFL's leading goalkicker was Dick Harris of Richmond with 64 goals.
- The winner of The Argus' "Player of the Year" was Dick Reynolds of Essendon.
- The winner of the 1937 Brownlow Medal was Dick Reynolds of Essendon with 27 votes.
- North Melbourne took the "wooden spoon" in 1937.
- The seconds premiership was won by Geelong. Geelong 12.12 (84) defeated Collingwood 9.11 (65) in the Grand Final, played as a stand-alone game on Thursday 30 September (Show Day holiday) at the Melbourne Cricket Ground.

== Sources ==
- 1937 VFL season at AFL Tables
- 1937 VFL season at Australian Football
